= List of Sanford and Son episodes =

Sanford and Son is an American sitcom based on the BBC sitcom Steptoe and Son. It aired every Friday from 8:00–8:30 PM (EST) on NBC from January 14, 1972 to March 25, 1977. The show starred Redd Foxx and Demond Wilson in the leading roles. The series follows Fred G. Sanford and his son Lamont as they operated a junk and antique dealership out of their home in Los Angeles.

== Series overview ==
| Season | Episodes | Originally released | | Rank | Rating |
| Season | Episodes | First released | Last released | Rank | Rating |
|---|---|---|---|---|---|
| 1 | 14 | January 14, 1972 | April 14, 1972 | 6 | 25.2 |
| 2 | 24 | September 15, 1972 | March 16, 1973 | 2 | 27.6 |
| 3 | 24 | September 14, 1973 | March 29, 1974 | 3 | 27.5 |
| 4 | 25 | September 13, 1974 | April 25, 1975 | 2 | 29.6 |
| 5 | 24 | September 12, 1975 | March 19, 1976 | 7 | 24.4 (Note: Tied with Rhoda) |
| 6 | 25 | September 24, 1976 | March 25, 1977 | 27 | 20.3 |

== Episodes ==
=== Season 1 (1972) ===
| No. overall | No. in season | Title | Directed by | Written by | Original release date | Prod. code |
|---|---|---|---|---|---|---|
| 1 | 1 | "Crossed Swords" | Bud Yorkin | Aaron Ruben Story by: Ray Galton and Alan Simpson | January 14, 1972 | 1 (101) |
Lamont (Demond Wilson) buys a porcelain figure for $15 from a silent movie star. After having it appraised, Lamont and Fred (Redd Foxx) decide to sell it at an auction. They attend the auction pretending to be buyers to bid the price even higher. However, to Lamont's dismay, things go awry. The first of 16 episodes adapted from Steptoe and Son based on the episode with the same title and some parts from "The Offer" by Ray Galton and Alan Simpson. Robert Mandan, who would later star in Soap as Chester Tate, appears as an auctioneer.
| 2 | 2 | "Happy Birthday, Pop" | Bud Yorkin | Story by : Ray Galton & Alan Simpson; Teleplay by : Aaron Ruben | January 21, 1972 | 2 (102) |
During his birthday celebration, Fred is overwhelmed by a visit to a fancy bar, a movie theater to see Fiddler on the Roof, and dinner at a Chinese restaurant. Based on "Sixty-Five Today" by Ray Galton and Alan Simpson.
| 3 | 3 | "Here Comes the Bride, There Goes the Bride" | Bud Yorkin | Story by : Ray Galton & Alan Simpson; Teleplay by : Aaron Ruben | January 28, 1972 | 3 (103) |
Lamont is excited about his upcoming wedding, but on the big day he quickly finds himself the only one who is. The bride dumps him at the altar, and his relatives beg to get back their wedding gifts. Based on "And Afterwards At..." by Ray Galton and Alan Simpson.
| 4 | 4 | "The Copper Caper" | Bud Yorkin | Story by : Ray Galton & Alan Simpson; Teleplay by : Aaron Ruben | February 4, 1972 | 4 (104) |
Fred and Lamont buy a load of copper from a man who has been stealing it from people in the neighborhood. Based on "The Lead Man Cometh" by Ray Galton and Alan Simpson. The Copper Caper is the first appearance by Hal Williams as Officer Smith (Smitty) and Noam Pitlik as Officer Swanhouser.
| 5 | 5 | "A Matter of Life and Breath" | George Tyne | Story by : Ray Galton & Alan Simpson; Teleplay by : Aaron Ruben | February 11, 1972 | 5 (105) |
Concerned about his father's smoker's cough, Lamont brings Fred in for a free tuberculosis screening at the American Lung Association's Breathmobile. The test results take his breath away. Based on "T.B. or Not T.B." by Ray Galton and Alan Simpson.
| 6 | 6 | "We Were Robbed" | Coby Ruskin | Story by : Ray Galton & Alan Simpson; Teleplay by : Aaron Ruben | February 18, 1972 | 6 (106) |
Oh, what a tangled web Fred weaves when he fakes a robbery to cover-up his careless destruction of Lamont's prized porcelain and glass collection. Based on "Robbery with Violence" by Ray Galton and Alan Simpson.
| 7 | 7 | "A Pad for Lamont" | Bob LaHendro | Story by : Ray Galton & Alan Simpson; Teleplay by : Aaron Ruben | February 25, 1972 | 7 (107) |
Fed up with his father frustrating his love life, Lamont strikes out on his own and rents a swingin' bachelor pad. Based on "A Box in Town" by Ray Galton and Alan Simpson. Lynn Hamilton, who would later play Donna Harris in several episodes, appears as Lamont's landlady.
| 8 | 8 | "The Great Sanford Siege" | Peter Baldwin | Story by : Ray Galton & Alan Simpson; Teleplay by : Aaron Ruben | March 3, 1972 | 8 (108) |
The Sanfords haven't been paying their bills and now find themselves trapped in their home in a standoff with a process server and a collection agency ready to repossess their unpaid furniture. Based on "The Siege of Steptoe Street" by Ray Galton and Alan Simpson. Dick Van Patten guest stars.
| 9 | 9 | "Coffins for Sale" | Charles S. Dubin | Story by : Ray Galton & Alan Simpson; Teleplay by : Aaron Ruben | March 10, 1972 | 9 (109) |
Lamont's keeping a pair of coffins in the living room spooks superstitious Fred. Based on "The Wooden Overcoats" by Ray Galton and Alan Simpson. Slappy White, who once performed with Redd Foxx, makes his first appearance as Melvin.
| 10 | 10 | "The Barracuda" | Charles S. Dubin | Story by : Ray Galton & Alan Simpson; Teleplay by : Aaron Ruben | March 17, 1972 | 10 (110) |
Fred's in love and engaged to be married, but not if Lamont can help it. Based on "The Stepmother" by Ray Galton and Alan Simpson. The Barracuda is Lynn Hamilton's first appearance as Donna Harris.
| 11 | 11 | "TV or Not TV" | Peter Baldwin | Story by : Ray Galton & Alan Simpson; Teleplay by : Aaron Ruben | March 24, 1972 | 11 (111) |
In need of a new color television, Fred is upset when Lamont decides to spend the money instead on a new car. Lamont has a change of heart, however, when Fred wanders away from home and is taken to the hospital - with an apparent case of amnesia. Based on "The Color Problem" by Ray Galton and Alan Simpson. Peter Bonerz guest stars.
| 12 | 12 | "The Suitcase Case" | Peter Baldwin | Everett Greenbaum & Jim Fritzell | March 31, 1972 | 12 (112) |
Lamont's daily haul of junk includes a tattered briefcase stuffed with stolen cash. Will Fred and Lamont decide whether to keep it or turn it over to the police before the crook it belongs to comes looking for it?
| 13 | 13 | "The Return of the Barracuda" | Peter Baldwin | Aaron Ruben | April 7, 1972 | 13 (113) |
Fred and Donna kiss and make up, sparking Lamont to hatch new plans for putting the kibosh on Cupid.
| 14 | 14 | "The Piano Movers" | Bruce Bilson | Story by : Ray Galton & Alan Simpson; Teleplay by : Aaron Ruben | April 14, 1972 | 14 (114) |
It's putting the match to the powder keg when rough and tumble Fred and Lamont are engaged to remove a piano from the lavish Beverly Hills apartment of a cultured antiques collector. Based on "The Piano" by Ray Galton and Alan Simpson.

=== Season 2 (1972–73) ===
| No. overall | No. in season | Title | Directed by | Written by | Original release date | Prod. code |
|---|---|---|---|---|---|---|
| 15 | 1 | "By the Numbers" | Peter Baldwin | Terry Ryan | September 15, 1972 | 17 (203) |
Freeloading family and friends flock to fleece the golden sheep when Fred plays the numbers. Don Bexley makes his first appearance as Bubba. Beah Richards appears as Aunt Ethel.
| 16 | 2 | "Whiplash" | Rick Edelstein | Allan Katz & Don Reo | September 22, 1972 | 19 (205) |
Fred's fine following his fender bender with a Cadillac, but Bubba convinces him to claim whiplash and then lay claim to a gold mine in monetary damages. Fred doesn’t hesitate to take advantage of this opportunity, wearing a neck brace and searching for an expensive new truck to buy. However, when the driver is caught, it’s revealed the car was stolen and thus Fred’s lawsuit won’t hold up in court. However, because Fred identified the thief, the Cadillac’s owner pays for the repairs to the old truck out of gratitude.
| 17 | 3 | "The Dowry" | Jack Shea | Richard Pryor & Paul Mooney | September 29, 1972 | 21 (207) |
Cousin Grady's overweight stepdaughter stands to receive a $10,000 dowry on her wedding day, which sets Fred to playing matchmaker with Lamont.
| 18 | 4 | "Jealousy" | Jack Shea | Everett Greenbaum & Jim Fritzell | October 6, 1972 | 22 (208) |
When Donna says she will be bringing a patient to dinner, Fred doesn't expect the spry and sophisticated Osgood Wilcox. Roscoe Lee Browne guest stars.
| 19 | 5 | "Tooth or Consequences" | Peter Baldwin | Ilunga Adell | October 13, 1972 | 23 (209) |
After all else fails, fraidy-cat Fred finally agrees to see a dentist for his toothache. Sid McCoy, who would direct and appear in a later episode and was the announcer for Soul Train, appears as a dentist.
| 20 | 6 | "The Card Sharps" | Peter Baldwin | Story by : Ray Galton & Alan Simpson; Teleplay by : Aaron Ruben | October 27, 1972 | 18 (204) |
Lamont won't heed Fred's warnings that he's being played for a sucker by some canny card sharps. Based on "Full House" by Ray Galton and Alan Simpson. Ron Glass and Thalmus Rasulala guest star.
| 21 | 7 | "Have Gun, Will Sell" | Rick Edelstein | Ilunga Adell | November 3, 1972 | 20 (206) |
After Lamont and his friend Rollo Lawson scare away a burglar who came in while Fred was sleeping, they realize that he left his gun at their house. Lamont and Rollo then pressure Fred into going to a pawn shop to try to sell the gun. However, they end up being mistaken for armed robbers and have a run-in with the police, while the burglar returns to the Sanford home looking for his gun and steals several valuables in the process. Nathaniel Taylor makes his first appearance as Rollo.
| 22 | 8 | "The Puerto Ricans Are Coming!" | Peter Baldwin | Allan Katz & Don Reo | November 10, 1972 | 25 (211) |
Fred's fighting mad to find that his new neighbor is a Puerto Rican man with a goat. However, his attempts to get rid of the competition ultimately backfires. The Puerto Ricans Are Coming! marks Gregory Sierra's first appearance as Julio Fuentes.
| 23 | 9 | "The Shootout" | Peter Baldwin | Allan Katz & Don Reo | November 17, 1972 | 24 (210) |
Shortly after Fred has a fight with his Jewish neighbor Herman Goldstein, Lamont brings home an antique Revolutionary War rifle he bought at an auction. While telling Lamont about one of his ancestors who actually fought in the war, Fred fires the rifle, which turns out to be loaded and shoots out Goldstein’s window. When Fred and Lamont cannot get any response from Goldstein whatsoever, they become convinced Fred accidentally killed him. However, just as Fred is ready to turn himself in, Goldstein shows up alive and well, having gone across town to cool off when the shooting happened.
| 24 | 10 | "Blood Is Thicker Than Junk" | Peter Baldwin | Allan Katz and Don Reo | November 24, 1972 | 16 (202) |
After a nasty spat Sanford and Son split up. Fred hires a new man to replace Lamont, who signs on to work with a competing junk dealer. Roger E. Mosley, who would later star in Magnum P.I. as T.C, appears Norman.
| 25 | 11 | "Sanford and Son and Sister Makes Three" | Rick Edelstein | Richard Pryor & Paul Mooney | December 1, 1972 | 27 (213) |
A widowed, husband-seeking old flame of Fred's returns with a shocking revelation that Fred is the biological father of her daughter, who has sparked a flaming passion in Lamont's heart. Ja'Net DuBois guest stars as Juanita and Emily Yancy appears as Alice.
| 26 | 12 | "A Guest in the Yard" | Jack Shea | Ilunga Adell | December 8, 1972 | 29 (215) |
Fred and Lamont discover that no good deed goes unpunished when the homeless man they help plays the Sanfords for suckers, resisting their every effort to throw him out. When they try to catch him in the act of conning them to have him arrested, Fred gets injured and the bum escapes. Fred then doesn’t hesitate to use his pain to his advantage.
| 27 | 13 | "Fred & Carol & Fred & Donna" | Rick Edelstein | Lloyd Garver & Ken Hecht | December 15, 1972 | 28 (214) |
Two-timing Fred's in the soup when he accidentally double books his dining room table by inviting both his fiancée Donna and the attractive saleswoman Carol (Kim Hamilton) over for supper on the same evening. Despite Fred and Lamont’s efforts, Donna and Carol find out the truth and both storm out angry. Fred subsequently apologizes to both women separately and they each forgive him.
| 28 | 14 | "The Light Housekeeper" | Peter Baldwin | Story by : Lee Kalcheim; Teleplay by : Lee Kalcheim and Aaron Ruben | December 22, 1972 | 15 (201) |
When Fred falls off the truck during a mishap on a junk run and is left temporarily crippled, Lamont hires a housekeeper, but Fred isn't wild about her being white. Mary Wickes guest stars.
| 29 | 15 | "The Big Party" | Jack Shea | Story by : Odie Hawkins; Teleplay by : Odie Hawkins and Aaron Ruben | January 5, 1973 | 30 (216) |
Behind on their bills, Fred and Lamont look to raise money by throwing a house party and charging admission. LaWanda Page makes her first appearance as Aunt Esther.
| 30 | 16 | "A Visit from Lena Horne" | Jack Shea | Allan Katz & Don Reo | January 12, 1973 | 26 (212) |
Fast-thinking Fred fools Lena Horne into visiting the Sanford home after he spins her a sob story about little lame Lamont who looks upon Lena as a second mother. John Amos appears as Luther, one of Fred's buddies.
| 31 | 17 | "Lamont Goes African" | Jack Shea | Ilunga Adell | January 19, 1973 | 31 (217) |
Lamont looks to reinvent himself by adopting an African name and lifestyle, and Fred soon discovers the reasons behind the transformation. Paula Kelly guest stars.
| 32 | 18 | "Watts Side Story" | Jack Shea | Lloyd Garver & Ken Hecht | January 26, 1973 | 32 (218) |
Lamont just met a girl named Maria (Migdia Chinea), but she's Julio's Puerto Rican sister, and the possibility of an interracial romance ruffles the feathers of both Fred and Mrs. Fuentes.
| 33 | 19 | "The Infernal Triangle" | Sid McCoy | Story by : Ray Galton & Alan Simpson; Teleplay by : Aaron Ruben | February 2, 1973 | 34 (220) |
Fred announces his engagement to Judy, a woman young enough to have been his daughter-in-law, who is also Lamont's ex-girlfriend. Based on "Two's Company" by Ray Galton and Alan Simpson. Ketty Lester appears as Judy.
| 34 | 20 | "Pops 'n' Pals" | Rick Edelstein | Allan Katz & Don Reo | February 9, 1973 | 33 (219) |
Jealous of Lamont's friendship with Julio, Fred tries to be a buddy to his son.
| 35 | 21 | "Home Sweet Home for the Aged" | Peter Baldwin | Story by : Ray Galton & Alan Simpson; Teleplay by : Aaron Ruben | February 16, 1973 | 35 (221) |
Before setting off to sail the world aboard a tramp steamer, Lamont must convince Fred to move into a retirement home. Based on "Homes Fit for Heroes" by Ray Galton and Alan Simpson.
| 36 | 22 | "Pot Luck" | Peter Baldwin | Story by : Ray Galton & Alan Simpson; Teleplay by : Aaron Ruben | February 23, 1973 | 36 (222) |
Lamont takes advantage of an ignorant seller and buys an antique commode for $20, greedily anticipating reselling it for a tremendous profit. Based on "The Three Feathers" by Ray Galton and Alan Simpson. Jonathan Harris (Lost in Space) guest stars.
| 37 | 23 | "The Kid" | Jack Shea | Everett Greenbaum & Jim Fritzell | March 9, 1973 | 37 (223) |
A 9-year-old lonely latchkey kid named Jason stows away on Lamont's truck and spends a day with the Sanfords. Although Fred is initially against the boy staying in his home, he soon changes his tune as Jason reminds him of Lamont as a child.
| 38 | 24 | "Rated X" | Peter Baldwin | Ilunga Adell | March 16, 1973 | 38 (224) |
Fred tags along to a movie casting call that Lamont and Rollo hope will make them respected black actors, not suspecting this film is blue. Just as they discover the true nature of the movie and try to leave, the studio is raided by the police. The trio end up staying in jail even after they’ve been proven innocent when Aunt Esther is the one who has to bail them out.

=== Season 3 (1973–74) ===
Note: Twenty-five episodes were written for Season Three, but the nineteenth was never taped due to contract disputes with Redd Foxx and producers of the show. The negotiations led to Foxx being absent from the last six episodes, but he returned to the series at the beginning of Season Four.

| No. overall | No. in season | Title | Directed by | Written by | Original release date | Prod. code |
|---|---|---|---|---|---|---|
| 39 | 1 | "Lamont as Othello" | Peter Baldwin | Ilunga Adell | September 14, 1973 | 40 (302) |
Fred is uneasy with Lamont's rehearsing Othello with a white actress in their home, so Marilyn invites Fred and Lamont to come to her home in Beverly Hills. Maureen Arthur guest stars.
| 40 | 2 | "Libra Rising All Over Lamont" | Jack Shea | Ilunga Adell | September 21, 1973 | 43 (305) |
As an astrologer tells Lamont that as a Libra he must avoid strife and arguing, hypochondriac Fred is home suffering from gas after eating eight-day-old collard greens. Lamont struggles to avoid clashing with Fred, which only gets harder when Aunt Esther visits. However, when Fred and Esther reminisce about the day Lamont was born, Lamont realizes he got the time of his birth wrong and he is actually an Aries. Lamont then starts standing up to Fred again. Whitman Mayo makes his first appearance as Grady Wilson.
| 41 | 3 | "Fred, the Reluctant Fingerman" | Jack Shea | Gene Farmer | September 28, 1973 | 44 (306) |
Fred, fearing retaliation after witnessing a robbery at Julio's, is unwilling to get involved by describing the burglars to the police. Lamont and Julio are upset by Fred’s refusal to do his civic duty, so they try to teach him a lesson by hiding the Sanfords’ truck and pretending it was stolen and Julio witnessed it but is too afraid to say anything. The plan works and Fred identifies the men who robbed Julio, but the truck is then apparently stolen for real. However, it was actually towed because Lamont parked it illegally when he hid it.
| 42 | 4 | "Presenting the Three Degrees" | Peter Baldwin | Ilunga Adell | October 5, 1973 | 42 (304) |
The Three Degrees, the Philadelphia-based singing trio, are the Sanfords' house-guests. The ladies perform "I Didn't Know" for Fred. The Three Degrees (Sheila Ferguson, Valerie Holiday and Fayette Pinkney would have a No. 1 hit in 1974 with When Will I See You Again and were featured vocalists on the MFSB No. 1 single TSOP (The Sound of Philadelphia) also in 1974.
| 43 | 5 | "This Little TV Went to Market" | Peter Baldwin | Gene Farmer | October 12, 1973 | 41 (303) |
Grady claims the television Fred got for a steal from Guy's Groovy Grab Bag was indeed stolen--from him. They get into an argument and Grady leaves threatening legal action. Panicked, Fred sells the set to Julio to get rid of it. When Grady returns with the police, he is shocked to find the TV gone, but Julio brings it back over and the fighting starts again. Ultimately, it turns out that Grady bought the TV from the Grab Bag first, then Guy stole it back and sold it to Fred. It is then revealed that Guy burglarized a local electronics store, which is how he obtained the TV in the first place. Fred and Grady are both forced to turn in the TV as evidence, but subsequently repair their friendship. Bernie Hamilton (Starsky and Hutch) makes a one-off appearance as Officer Jones.
| 44 | 6 | "Lamont, Is That You?" | Peter Baldwin | James R. Stein & Robert Illes | October 19, 1973 | 39 (301) |
Fred fears Lamont and Rollo are homosexuals after Bubba reports seeing them go into the Gay Blade Bar. In reality, they went in there by accident, but Fred becomes obsessed with setting Lamont straight.
| 45 | 7 | "Fuentes, Fuentes, Sanford & Chico" | Jack Shea | Gene Farmer | October 26, 1973 | 45 (307) |
Feeling betrayed when Lamont starts a sideline business with Julio, Fred moves out and into a downtown flophouse.
| 46 | 8 | "Superflyer" | Peter Baldwin | Story by : Charles T. Williams; Teleplay by : Charles T. Williams and Ilunga Adell | November 2, 1973 | 48 (310) |
Fred's Uncle Leotis dies and leaves him $1,500, but the catch to collecting it is Fred and Lamont must fly to St. Louis and oversee the funeral arrangements. But steady Freddy isn't sure he's ready to take his first flight in an airplane.
| 47 | 9 | "The Members of the Wedding" "The Engagement" | Jack Shea | James R. Stein & Robert Illes | November 9, 1973 | 49 (311) |
Fred and Donna are to be married on Sunday, but Lamont plots to put them asunder before the Lord joins them together by inviting to the wedding his Aunt Esther and the rest of Fred's irascible in-laws.
| 48 | 10 | "The Blind Mellow Jelly Collection" "The Chameleon" | Mark Warren | Phil Mishkin | November 16, 1973 | 47 (309) |
Lamont becomes annoyed that Fred is constantly playing old blues records by Blind Mellow Jelly. Then, he finds out the records are rare and could be worth several hundred dollars.
| 49 | 11 | "A House is Not a Pool Room" | Jack Shea | Winston Moss | November 23, 1973 | 46 (308) |
Lamont suffers buyer's remorse after the pool table he gave Fred for his birthday brings the boys over for billiards every day while Fred's work and girlfriend Donna go neglected.
| 50 | 12 | "Grady, the Star Boarder" | Jack Shea | Gene Farmer | November 30, 1973 | 50 (312) |
Fred seizes a financial opportunity when Grady gripes about his neighbors' fighting: invite Grady to come live in serenity for $60 a month with him and Lamont until Grady wears out his welcome inside The Sanford Home.
| 51 | 13 | "Wine, Women & Aunt Esther" "Leaving the Nest" | Peter Baldwin | Story by : James R. Stein & Robert Illes; Teleplay by : Ilunga Adell | December 14, 1973 | 52 (314) |
Depressed about death and growing old, Fred and his drinking buddies determine to think young and go for the gusto by throwing a wild party, inviting topless waitress Fast Fanny and four of her fast friends to spice it up. Lamont ruins the party by getting Fred and his friends drunk before Fast Fanny and her friends arrive.
| 52 | 14 | "Mama's Baby, Papa's Maybe" | Jack Shea | Ilunga Adell | January 4, 1974 | 51 (313) |
Fred's feathers get ruffled when an old friend from St. Louis, “Big Money Grip” Matlock, comes to town claiming to be Lamont's actual father. Incensed at the thought that his late wife would cheat on him, Fred goes so far as to invite Aunt Esther over to hear the claim for herself. Equally shocked and furious at the idea that her sister would commit adultery, Esther obviously sides with Fred. Lamont walks in on the chaos, and when he learns what’s going on, he says Fred will always be his father, even if not by blood. In the end, it’s revealed that when Grip snuck over to Elizabeth’s old house to hook up with her, he got confused and slept with Esther by mistake, much to her horror.
| 53 | 15 | "Fred Sanford, Legal Eagle" | Bob LaHendro | Story by : Paul Mooney and Gene Farmer; Teleplay by : Gene Farmer | January 11, 1974 | 53 (315) |
When Lamont gets a traffic ticket, Fred convinces him to fight it in court, where the poor man's Perry Mason steps up to defend his son against the system. He invites his friends in court and goes overboard and gets held in contempt, but Lamont wins anyway. Antonio Fargas (Starsky and Hutch, Everybody Hates Chris) appears as Sonny Cochran, a lawyer friend of Grady's who gives Fred and Lamont advice.
| 54 | 16 | "This Land is Whose Land?" | Peter Baldwin | Ilunga Adell | January 18, 1974 | 54 (316) |
Fred, petty and prejudiced against his Puerto Rican neighbor, hires a surveyor to mark the legal property line to ensure Julio keeps his stuff off the Sanford side.
| 55 | 17 | "Fred's Cheating Heart" | Stan Lathan | Ilunga Adell | February 1, 1974 | 55 (317) |
After learning about the dangers and high risk of heart disease, Lamont plots to get his heart attack-prone father to the hospital for a cardio check-up. Unsurprisingly, Fred hates being in the hospital at first, but when he sees how well the sick people are treated and fussed over, he schemes to get attention himself by switching his bed chart with someone else’s and pretending to actually be sick. However, Fred’s plan backfires as he ends up nearly getting an operation he doesn’t need. Joan Pringle guest stars as a nurse.
| 56 | 18 | "The Party Crasher" | Stan Lathan | Gene Farmer | February 8, 1974 | 56 (318) |
Lamont and Rollo don't want to invite fuddy-duddy Fred to their party with a pair of live-wire women from Detroit. Angela Gibbs, daughter of Marla Gibbs (The Jeffersons, 227) appears. The Party Crasher is the final episode Redd Foxx would appear in season 3 due to his contract dispute with NBC.
| 57 | 19 | "Lamont Goes Karate" | Bud Yorkin | Ilunga Adell | February 15, 1974 | 57 (319) |
Lamont learns karate to defend himself against bully Jo Jo Jackson after he gets punched in the nose when Jo Jo’s girlfriend falls for him. Fearing for Lamont’s safety, Grady gets Jo Jo to pretend to be scared off by Lamont’s karate skills.
| 58 | 20 | "Will the Real Fred Sanford Please Do Something" | Stan Lathan | Aaron Ruben | February 22, 1974 | 58 (320) |
A woman Fred wooed over one too many boilermakers comes looking to take him up on his marriage proposal. Betty is bent on getting satisfaction and skeptical of Grady's insisting he's not Fred.
| 59 | 21 | "Tyranny, Thy Name Is Grady" | Stan Lathan | Gene Farmer | March 1, 1974 | 59 (321) |
With Fred away in St. Louis, Grady is put in charge of the house. He quickly makes his presence known by keeping Aunt Esther out and preventing Lamont from bringing girls home. Annoyed by this, Lamont tricks Grady into leaving and locks him out so that he and Rollo can have fun with their dates, but Grady retaliates by inviting Aunt Esther’s Bible group to the house for their meeting. Aunt Esther crashes the party and Lamont’s evening is ruined again.
| 60 | 22 | "Aunt Esther & Uncle Woodrow Pfft..." | Bud Yorkin | Ilunga Adell | March 8, 1974 | 60 (322) |
When Aunt Esther’s husband Uncle Woodrow stays out all night drinking on their wedding anniversary, Esther is so incensed that she locks him out of the house, forcing Woody to move into the Sanford home. Not wanting a new houseguest, Grady gets Woody drunk and an empowering man-to-man talk, sends him home to reclaim his castle and retaliates against Esther. But when Woody goes too far, Esther is the one who ends up locked out. Forced to live in the Sanford house herself, Esther doesn't appreciate Grady's making a man of her husband and shows that hell hath no fury like the wife of a worm turned. Of course, everything turns out alright in the end. First appearance of Raymond Allen as Uncle Woody.
| 61 | 23 | "The Way to Lamont's Heart" | Hal Cooper | Story by : Paul Wayne & George Burditt; Teleplay by : Paul Wayne & George Burditt and Aaron Ruben | March 15, 1974 | 61 (323) |
Lamont's looking for a little lovin', but new girlfriend Judy (Judy Pace) is looking to settle down. When Lamont tells Judy he can't get married because his godfather Grady would disapprove, Judy sets to winning Grady's approval with a smile and a smoked pork butt, which sets Grady jumping to the conclusion that it’s his heart Judy’s after.
| 62 | 24 | "Hello Cousin Emma, Goodbye Cousin Emma" | Hal Cooper | Bill Manhoff | March 29, 1974 | 62 (324) |
Grady's cousin Emma blows in from the Windy City and promises to make the living easy for the two men, but Lamont has his doubts, especially after being bumped from his bedroom and having to share a bed with Grady. Clarice Taylor, who would later play Anna Huxtable in The Cosby Show, guest stars as cousin Emma.

=== Season 4 (1974–75) ===
| No. overall | No. in season | Title | Directed by | Written by | Original release date | Prod. code |
|---|---|---|---|---|---|---|
| 63 | 1 | "The Surprise Party" | Norman Abbott | Saul Turteltaub & Bernie Orenstein | September 13, 1974 | 71 (409) |
Fred returns from St. Louis to a welcome home surprise party. Lamont must exercise diplomacy and peacekeeping after he bruises the feelings of both Fred and Grady. The Surprise Party was shown as the 1974-75 season premiere, although three episodes had already been taped while Redd Foxx was still absent due to a contract dispute.
| 64 | 2 | "Matchmaker, Matchmaker" | Bill Foster | Jerry Ross | September 20, 1974 | 69 (407) |
Lamont stands to inherit $7,000 if within a year he marries and has a son named after his late uncle George. Fred sees dollar signs, so he and Grady set to making marriage bells ring by turning to a computer dating service.
| 65 | 3 | "Ol' Brown Eyes is Back" | Bill Foster | Rick Mittleman | September 27, 1974 | 68 (406) |
Fred is celebrating 35 years in the junk business and snoops and finds his intended gift: a signet ring with his initials on it that Rollo got for a good price. Then Fred learns that among the items recently stolen from Frank Sinatra's hotel room was an initialed signet ring. Convinced Rollo was the thief and fearing Lamont will be considered an accessory, Fred tries to sneak the ring back into Sinatra’s room. He gets caught and confesses to the burglary to save Lamont. Lamont explains to Fred that he, Rollo, and all of Fred’s other friends chipped in to buy the ring for him. However, it is discovered the ring is fake and Rollo pocketed the money for himself. Rollo later brings Fred a signed Jackie Robinson baseball as an apology, much to Fred’s delight. Unfortunately, the ball turns out to be a forgery and Fred gets mad again.
| 66 | 4 | "Grady and His Lady" | Stan Lathan | Gene Farmer | October 4, 1974 | 70 (408) |
Fred fears wedding bells will break up his beautiful friendship after Grady announces he's engaged to Dolly, so Fred plots to puncture the romance by accidentally tripping over the rug and spilling the wine on Dolly's dress. She grabs Lamont's robe and puts it on, When Grady arrives to The Sanford home, He thinks that Fred and Dolly are having sex with each other until Fred tells Grady the truth about him and Dolly, Grady and Dolly both have an argument with each other until their engagement is broken.
| 67 | 5 | "There'll Be Some Changes Made" | Norman Abbott | Jerry Ross and Earl Pomerantz | October 11, 1974 | 66 (404) |
Lamont moves out after a fight with Fred, but Fred lures his son back by agreeing to allow Lamont's eccentric encounter group to hold its meeting in their home. There'll Be Some Changes Made introduces the recurring character Ah Chew, played by Pat Morita. Actress, model and former Miss Ohio Jayne Kennedy, who would later become one of the hosts of CBS's NFL Today, appears as one of the group members.
| 68 | 6 | "Going Out of Business" | Norman Abbott | Saul Turteltaub & Bernie Orenstein | October 18, 1974 | 67 (405) |
To get a better tax break and increase their income, Lamont gets a job as a clerk at a haberdashery and Fred considers closing down Sanford and Son.
| 69 | 7 | "Home Sweet Home" | Norman Abbott | Ted Bergmann | October 25, 1974 | 73 (411) |
A Japanese real estate firm wants to buy and tear down all the properties on the Sanfords' block in order to build a brewery. Fred becomes greedy to raise up the price for his house, The Japanese real estate firm invies Fred and Lamont to their home, Fred jeopardizes the deal by running out on them until The Japanese real estate firm decides not to tear down all the properties including Fred's house in order to build a brewery.
| 70 | 8 | "My Kingdom For a Horse" | Bill Foster | Arnie Rosen | November 1, 1974 | 72 (410) |
Fred buys a retired thoroughbred racehorse, betting on a big profit after selling him as a breeding stud. Ned Wertimer, who would later play Ralph the Doorman on The Jeffersons, appears as a horse breeder.
| 71 | 9 | "Sanford and Niece" | Norman Abbott | Saul Turteltaub & Bernie Orenstein | November 8, 1974 | 74 (412) |
Fred's tender side is stirred when his niece Elizabeth (played by Tina Andrews) comes to visit and bears a striking resemblance to his late wife. Upon discovering one of Elizabeth’s roommates is male, Fred tries desperately to hide this fact from obsessively religious Aunt Esther. However, he finds out the hard way his efforts aren’t necessary. Berlinda Tolbert (The Jeffersons) and Ray Vitte guest star as Elizabeth's college roommates.
| 72 | 10 | "Julio and Sister and Nephew" | Alan Rafkin | Saul Turteltaub & Bernie Orenstein | November 15, 1974 | 76 (414) |
Allergic to Chico the goat, Julio's sister Carlotta and young nephew Roberto stay with the Sanfords. Though he fiercely refuses the idea of having Puerto Ricans in his house at first, Fred changes his mind when Carlotta insists on doing all the housework. Controversy arises when young Roberto is placed down a grade in school because of his poor English skills. Julio is furious at the discrimination, but Lamont says nothing can be done. When Roberto keeps refusing to go into a lower grade, he gets suspended. Fred is appalled to learn that several Spanish-speaking children are stuck in lower grades, arguing that they are not getting a proper education, and convinces the principal to tutor Roberto so he can stay in the class he belongs in.
| 73 | 11 | "Fred's Treasure Garden" | Herbert Kenwith | Ilunga Adell | November 29, 1974 | 63 (401) |
Among the vegetables growing in Grady's garden is "wild parsley," only Lamont and Rollo recognize it by a different name: marijuana! What’s worse, Grady makes a salad with it and serves it to Officers Smitty and Hoppy. When the cops appear to get high from the salad, Grady and Lamont panic and try to get rid of it. Fortunately Aunt Esther drops in and when she tries the salad, she confirms it actually does contain wild parsley. Fred's Treasure Garden is one of three episodes which had been taped for the 1974-75 season while Redd Foxx was still absent due to a contract dispute.
| 74 | 12 | "Tower Power" | Bill Foster | Calvin Kelly | December 6, 1974 | 78 (416) |
A visit to a gallery of abstract art inspires Fred to create his magnum opus: a towering heap of junk.
| 75 | 13 | "A Little Extra Security" | Herbert Kenwith | Saul Turteltaub & Bernie Orenstein | December 13, 1974 | 65 (403) |
Grady receives an extra Social Security check by mistake and wastes no time celebrating his windfall, Grady cashes both checks, but the wind falls from his sails when he learns Mr. Hastings from the Social Security office is on his way over to the house. However, Mr. Hastings ends up giving Grady a third Social Security check due to another misunderstanding at his office. Stymie Beard guest stars as Otis Littlejohn. A Little Extra Security is one of three episodes which had been taped for the 1974-75 season while Redd Foxx was still absent due to a contract dispute.
| 76 | 14 | "The Merger" | Bill Foster | Jerry Ross | December 20, 1974 | 77 (415) |
The Sanfords and Julio agree to merge their competing junkyards and bank on business booming after they broadcast a television commercial. Their arguments during filming of said commercial looms only disaster.
| 77 | 15 | "Once a Thief" | Herbert Kenwith | Winston Moss | December 27, 1974 | 64 (402) |
Grady gets uptight when Lamont brings his ex-convict friend Herman (Ron Glass) home to stay until he can find a job. Grady refuses to believe Herman has reformed and continues to treat him like a criminal. Uncle Woody fires his store assistant for stealing and Lamont persuades Aunt Esther to give Herman the job by hiding Herman’s criminal past. Herman later tells Aunt Esther the truth about his past and she fires him. Grady’s radio breaks and he can’t hear a big fight on which he bet with Bubba. Herman buys him a new radio, but Grady naturally thinks it’s stolen and this causes confusion. Eventually, Aunt Esther has a change of heart and gives Herman his job back. Once a Thief is one of three episodes which had been taped for the 1974-75 season while Redd Foxx was still absent due to a contract dispute.
| 78 | 16 | "The Stand-Ins" | Bill Foster | Saul Turteltaub & Bernie Orenstein | January 17, 1975 | 82 (420) |
The Sanfords welcome Fred's buddies Bowlegs (Scatman Crothers) and Al, who are bringing their song, dance and comedy act to an LA nightclub. When Al hurts his back, Fred and Lamont step up and step out in a revue episode highlighted by Billy Eckstine singing "Jelly Jelly."
| 79 | 17 | "Strange Bedfellows" | Norman Abbott | Ted Bergmann | January 24, 1975 | 75 (413) |
Praise for Lamont's impassioned call into a radio political program sparks him to run for the state assembly. Will it be Mr. Sanford goes to Sacramento? Fred thinks Lamont not showing his appreciation to him, Grady comes over to keep Fred company until Aunt Esther arrives and spoils Fred and Grady's company. Fred has goes to Sacramento for the assemblyman's debate.Margaret Avery guest stars as Lamont's date.
| 80 | 18 | "The Masquerade Party" | Norman Abbott | Story by : Redd Foxx; Teleplay by : Ted Bergmann | January 31, 1975 | 80 (418) |
In a spoof of "Let's Make a Deal," Fred, Grady and Bubba appear as contestants on "Wheel and Deal," hoping to win a birthday present for Lamont until they ruin the birthday party.
| 81 | 19 | "Golden Boy" | Norman Abbott | George Yanok & Bob Garland | February 7, 1975 | 81 (419) |
Fred hopes to get rich quick by becoming co-owner of a boxer dubbed Junior Joe Louis. It then becomes Fred and Grady's job to get Junior into fighting shape before Friday's bout.Fred jeopardizes and cancels the fight.David Doyle (Charlie's Angels) guest stars as a fight promoter.
| 82 | 20 | "My Brother-in-Law's Keeper" | Norman Abbott | Ted Bergman | February 14, 1975 | 79 (417) |
Fred is bothered and bewildered by his baby sister's marriage to a white man. Mary Alice appears as Frances.
| 83 | 21 | "The Headache" | Bill Foster | Arnie Rosen | February 21, 1975 | 83 (421) |
Lamont's headache drives him to the psychologist's couch, where it is suggested the pain in Lamont's head is caused by the pain in the neck he lives with.Fred finds out about Lamont's headache by going to the psychiatrist Robert Do Qui appears as Lamont's psychiatrist.
| 84 | 22 | "The Stung" | Alan Rafkin | George Yanok & Bob Garland | February 28, 1975 | 85 (423) |
Tired of Lamont telling him he's a loser at cards, Fred and his professional gambler friend Al play a prank on Lamont and his poker pals. But will Fred be left holding the dead man's hand? Final appearance of Gregory Sierra as Julio Fuentes.
| 85 | 23 | "The Older Woman" | Alan Rafkin | Ted Bergman | March 7, 1975 | 84 (422) |
Fred and Grady don disguises to discover the cougar who has her claws in Lamont's heart. Kim Hamilton, who appeared in a previous episode as Carol Davis, guest stars.
| 86 | 24 | "The Over-the-Hill Gag" | Stan Lathan | Matt Robinson | March 14, 1975 | 87 (425) |
Lamont misunderstands the doctor and believes Fred has only six months to live and lavishes love and kindness upon him. Fred's content to ride the gravy train, though it may land him in the soup until the doctor comes over and reveals the truth about Fred.
| 87 | 25 | "The Family Man" | Bud Yorkin | Saul Turteltaub & Bernie Orenstein | April 25, 1975 | 86 (424) |
The story of Grady and his eyebrow-raising gift to his daughter and son-in-law just before their cocktail party for stuffy university professors. Note: The Family Man serves as a backdoor pilot for the spin-off Grady which also starred Joe Morton, Carole Cole and Haywood Nelson (later of What's Happening!!). It is the only episode in which neither Redd Foxx nor Demond Wilson appear.

=== Season 5 (1975–76) ===
| No. overall | No. in season | Title | Directed by | Written by | Original release date | Prod. code |
|---|---|---|---|---|---|---|
| 88 | 1 | "Earthquake II" | Bill Foster | Jerry Ross | September 12, 1975 | 95 (508) |
An earthquake shakes up the Sanfords, and the threat of an even bigger quake sparks Fred to sell the house and seek shelter in Las Vegas. Merv Griffin, Steve Lawrence and Eydie Gormé appear as themselves.
| 89 | 2 | "Divorce, Sanford Style" | Alan Rafkin | Ted Bergman | September 19, 1975 | 91 (504) |
Following a fight with Woodrow over his fidelity, Aunt Esther moves in with Fred and Lamont. Fred works overtime engineering a reconciliation so she'll return home. Though the evening takes a rather comedic turn, Esther and Woodrow reconcile.
| 90 | 3 | "Bank on This" | Alan Rafkin | Saul Turteltaub and Bernie Orenstein | September 26, 1975 | 92 (505) |
Fred and Lamont are applying for a loan to finance their purchase of Julio's former property when a pair of robbers burst into the bank. Bank on This marked an early acting role for future Sesame Street regular Roscoe Orman.
| 91 | 4 | "The Sanford Arms" | Mark Warren | Ted Bergman | October 3, 1975 | 94 (507) |
With the bank ready to foreclose, Fred and Lamont desperately seek to find tenants for the Sanford Arms. Nancy Kulp (The Beverly Hillbillies) appears as May Hopkins, Hoppy's mother.
| 92 | 5 | "Steinberg and Son" | James Sheldon | Saul Turteltaub and Bernie Orenstein | October 10, 1975 | 97 (510) |
The series spoofs itself when the characters in the new television show "Steinberg and Son" turn out to be Borscht Belt parallels to those in the life of Fred G. Sanford. Robert Guillaume (Soap, Benson) guests as the Sanfords' lawyer. Lou Jacobi, who had acted with Redd Foxx in the 1970 movie Cotton Comes to Harlem, appears as the TV character Steinberg. John Larroquette (Night Court) makes an early television appearance as Steinberg's son.
| 93 | 6 | "Brother, Can You Spare an Act?" | Bill Foster | Saul Turteltaub and Bernie Orenstein | October 17, 1975 | 96 (509) |
When Fred's white brother-in-law Rodney lands a job emceeing a local vaudeville revival, Fred, Lamont and Smiley Rogers (comedian Timmie Rogers) help out by providing the song and dance.
| 94 | 7 | "Della, Della, Della" | Mark Warren | Saul Turteltaub and Bernie Orenstein | October 31, 1975 | 100 (513) |
When two competing politicians each seek to use Fred's junkyard for a campaign headquarters, Della Reese appeals to Fred to stand by her man.
| 95 | 8 | "Donna Pops the Question" | James Sheldon | Saul Turteltaub and Bernie Orenstein | November 7, 1975 | 89 (502) |
After receiving a proposal from another man, Donna gives Fred one final chance to marry her. Demond Wilson does not appear.
| 96 | 9 | "My Fair Esther" | James Sheldon | Jerry Ross | November 14, 1975 | 98 (511) |
Fred becomes a latter-day Henry Higgins when he undertakes the task of transforming ugly duckling Esther into a swan so she can win the Mrs. Watts Businessman's Contest and net Fred half the prize money.
| 97 | 10 | "Sanford and Rising Son" | Mark Warren | Ted Bergman and Garry Shandling | November 21, 1975 | 102 (515) |
Fred and Ah Chew (Pat Morita) team up and turn the Sanford home into a Japanese restaurant.
| 98 | 11 | "The Olympics" | Mark Warren | Madelyn Davis and Bob Carroll, Jr. | December 5, 1975 | 90 (503) |
Jealous of Donna's athletic new boyfriend, Fred begins training so he can challenge him in the Senior Olympics. Percy Rodriguez, who would later appear in the Sanford revival, plays "Big" Lou Turner.
| 99 | 12 | "Ebenezer Sanford" | James Sheldon | Saul Turteltaub and Bernie Orenstein | December 12, 1975 | 104 (517) |
Tightfisted Fred gets a ghostly wake-up call in a spoof of Charles Dickens' 1843 novel "A Christmas Carol." Eric Laneuville, who would later portray Esther and Woody's adopted son Daniel, makes an appearance. Marc Copage (Corey from Julia) appears as a young Fred in a flashback scene.
| 100 | 13 | "The Oddfather" | James Sheldon | Saul Turteltaub and Bernie Orenstein | January 2, 1976 | 88 (501) |
Fred is wounded while witnessing a mob hit and is hospitalized under police protection until he can identify Mr. Big. Demond Wilson does not appear in this episode. Dick O'Neill, Roy Stuart (Gomer Pyle, USMC) and Gloria Delaney guest star.
| 101 | 14 | "Can You Chop This?" | Mark Warren | Joni Rhodes | January 9, 1976 | 101 (514) |
Fred plans to get rich quick by selling Whopper Chopper food processors, using Lamont's acting school tuition money to make his initial investment.
| 102 | 15 | "Greatest Show in Watts" | Sid McCoy | Jerry Ross | January 16, 1976 | 99 (512) |
While babysitting an elephant, Fred holds a circus in the junkyard, allowing the cast to display their talents, especially Aunt Esther as the Bronze Goddess.
| 103 | 16 | "Fred Sanford Has a Baby" | James Sheldon | Jay Burton | January 23, 1976 | 103 (516) |
A very pregnant woman rents Lamont's room for the week he's away on a fishing trip.
| 104 | 17 | "The TV Addict" | Mark Warren | Jerry Ross | January 30, 1976 | 93 (506) |
Fred's lifestyle of too much TV and too little exercise has Lamont concerned for his father's health, so Fred undergoes hypnotism to break his addiction to television.
| 105 | 18 | "Lamont in Love" | Alan Rafkin | Ted Bergman | February 6, 1976 | 105 (518) |
When Lamont falls in love with a mysterious woman, Fred and Esther play amateur sleuths to learn more about her.
| 106 | 19 | "The Escorts" | Alan Rafkin | Jerry Ross | February 13, 1976 | 106 (519) |
When Fred's friend Elroy can't find a date, Fred's inspired to launch his latest get-rich-quick scheme: an escort service for seniors. Guest starring: Helen Martin.
| 107 | 20 | "The Engagement Man Always Rings Twice" | Lewis Gomavitz | Ted Bergman | February 20, 1976 | 107 (520) |
Lamont musters the courage to pop the question to Janet.
| 108 | 21 | "The Director" | Alan Rafkin | Garry Shandling | February 27, 1976 | 110 (523) |
Starstruck Fred assumes the director's chair when the champ George Foreman comes to star in a play for Lamont's theater workshop. In real life Foreman was not actually the heavyweight champion at the time, having lost the title to Muhammad Ali in October 1974.
| 109 | 22 | "A Pain in the Neck" | Alan Rafkin | Rick Mittleman | March 5, 1976 | 108 (521) |
Fred's friends have got his back, as he discovers when he suffers from a backache on the day he is to receive the Watts Businessman's award and his friends rush to his aid with all kinds of quack cures.
| 110 | 23 | "Sergeant Gork" | Bill Wyse | Story by : Redd Foxx and Ted Bergman; Teleplay by : Ted Bergman | March 12, 1976 | 111 (524) |
Fred regales young Roger with tall tales of his World War II exploits that draw more from the late movie than the history books.
| 111 | 24 | "Camping Trip" | Alan Rafkin | Garry Shandling | March 19, 1976 | 109 (522) |
Lamont brings Fred along on a camping trip to have some solitude and quality time together. Fred is no friend of nature and does nothing but complain...when the truck won't start they are stranded and begin to reminisce about old times.

=== Season 6 (1976–77) ===
| No. overall | No. in season | Title | Directed by | Written by | Original release date | Prod. code |
|---|---|---|---|---|---|---|
| 112 | 1 | "The Hawaiian Connection: Part 1" | Alan Rafkin | Saul Turteltaub and Bernie Orenstein | September 24, 1976 | 115 (604) |
| 113 | 2 | "The Hawaiian Connection: Part 2" | Alan Rafkin | Saul Turteltaub and Bernie Orenstein | September 24, 1976 | 116 (605) |
Luring Fred and Lamont to Hawaii, a trio of jewel thieves plot to make Fred their mule for smuggling stolen diamonds to California. Legendary television director and producer Sheldon Leonard, Greg Morris (Mission: Impossible) and Barbara Rhoades guest star in the three season-opening episodes.
| 114 | 3 | "The Hawaiian Connection: Part 3" | Alan Rafkin | Saul Turteltaub and Bernie Orenstein | October 1, 1976 | 117 (606) |
Fred and Lamont visit Hawaii tourist attractions while running for their lives from the jewel thieves.
| 115 | 4 | "California Crude" | Norman Abbott | Alan Eisenstock & Larry Mintz | October 8, 1976 | 119 (608) |
While Fred and Lamont are digging a garden, oil is discovered underground at the junk yard. Fred sees millions but before any money can be paid it must first be tested.
| 116 | 5 | "The Stakeout" | Norman Abbott | Earl Barret | October 15, 1976 | 118 (607) |
The police are looking for a fence named Alex Hacker who's been spotted coming in and out of The Sanford Arms. They use Fred and Lamont's home to stakeout the Arms. Meanwhile, Fred has a crush on a new lady tenant.
| 117 | 6 | "I Dream of Choo-Choo Rabinowitz" | Alan Rafkin | Larry Mintz and Alan Eisenstock | October 22, 1976 | 113 (602) |
Fred is determined to break Choo-Choo Rabinowitz's official world record for the longest amount of time staying awake.
| 118 | 7 | "The Winning Ticket" | Alan Rafkin | Bob DeVinney | November 5, 1976 | 114 (603) |
A couple of con men sucker Fred into running a rigged lucky number contest for which the crooks secretly hold the winning ticket.
| 119 | 8 | "Committee Man" | Chuck Liotta | Garry Shandling | November 12, 1976 | 120 (609) |
Soon after Fred is appointed to serve on a mayor's committee he is sought out by a slumlord offering a bribe for political favors. Edward Andrews and Ronnie Schell guest star.
| 120 | 9 | "Fred's Extra Job" | Alan Rafkin | Saul Turteltaub and Bernie Orenstein | November 19, 1976 | 112 (601) |
Fred works nights as a bus boy in a fancy restaurant so he can begin paying back the $6,000 bank loan he took out in order to give Lamont an impressive wedding gift.
| 121 | 10 | "Carol" | Alan Rafkin | Earl Barret | November 26, 1976 | 125 (614) |
Fred's old friend Carol shows up after 40 years, stirring up memories and sparking a flashback to the Summer of 1936 when Fred was a pool hustler in Cleveland.
| 122 | 11 | "Aunt Esther Has a Baby" | Alan Rafkin | Saul Turteltaub and Bernie Orenstein | December 3, 1976 | 121 (610) |
Esther and Woody plan to be parents for the first time, but for it to happen Esther is going to need Fred's help.
| 123 | 12 | "Aunt Esther Meets Her Son" | Al Rabin | Saul Turteltaub and Bernie Orenstein | December 10, 1976 | 122 (611) |
Esther and Woody welcome their son Daniel, but quickly discover they must practice the forgiveness that Esther preaches. Daniel is played by Eric Laneuville, who had early acting roles in Room 222 and would later star in St. Elsewhere.
| 124 | 13 | "Sanford and Gong" | Bill Foster | Saul Turteltaub and Bernie Orenstein | December 17, 1976 | 123 (612) |
Fred, Lamont, Donna and Bubba attend a taping of "The Gong Show" and are inspired to audition as contestants, bringing their musical act onto the show. Chuck Barris appears as himself.
| 125 | 14 | "Here Today, Gone Today" | Bill Foster | Warren S. Murray | January 7, 1977 | 126 (615) |
Misunderstandings abound and compound when Fred's friends try to honor his 40th year in business with a secret surprise.
| 126 | 15 | "Fred Meets Redd" | Bill Foster | Saul Turteltaub and Bernie Orenstein | January 14, 1977 | 124 (613) |
The fourth wall falls when Fred enters NBC's Redd Foxx look-alike contest and eagerly anticipates meeting his idol face to face.
| 127 | 16 | "The Defiant One" "Chinese Torture" | Russ Petranto | Alan Eisenstock & Larry Mintz | January 21, 1977 | 127 (616) |
Rehearsing his magic act, Grady snaps a pair of trick shackles onto Fred and Esther, only to discover the instructions for removing them are printed in Chinese.
| 128 | 17 | "A Matter of Silence" | Russ Petranto | John T. Bell | January 28, 1977 | 128 (617) |
Lamont fears Fred is going deaf, and Fred is content to play along and milk sympathy from Lamont and Donna.
| 129 | 18 | "When John Comes Marching Home" | Russ Petranto | Alan Eisenstock & Larry Mintz | February 4, 1977 | 129 (618) |
Lamont's engagement to Janet is jeopardized by the unexpected return of her ex-husband John. James A. Watson Jr. guest stars.
| 130 | 19 | "The Reverend Sanford" | Russ Petranto | Jim Belcher | February 11, 1977 | 130 (619) |
To avoid paying taxes, Fred buys a mail-order clergy ordination and transforms his home into the Chapel on the Junkpile for the church of the Seventh-Day Junkists. Comedian Sammy Shore, creator of The Comedy Store, father of actor Pauly Shore, and former husband of long-time Comedy Store owner Mitzi Shore guest stars as the head of the church.
| 131 | 20 | "The Will" | Russ Petranto | Saul Turteltaub and Bernie Orenstein | February 18, 1977 | 131 (620) |
Fred suffers amnesia after being bludgeoned with Esther's silver-plated Bible. Having looked death in the face, Fred wants to get his affairs in order and so prepares his last will and testament and summons his friends for its reading.
| 132 | 21 | "Fred the Activist" | Russ Petranto | Richard Freidman & Stephen Young | February 25, 1977 | 132 (621) |
Angered by the age discrimination policy of a local stereo dealer, Fred rallies a troop of Gray Foxes and leads the charge to change the policy. Fred the Activist features an early television appearance by Taurean Blacque, who would later star in Hill Street Blues.
| 133 | 22 | "The Lucky Streak" | Russ Petranto | Joseph R. Henderson | March 4, 1977 | 133 (622) |
Fred and Lamont need to raise $4,000 by Friday or lose the Sanford Arms. Fred plans to parlay his $500 savings into the needed amount by playing poker, betting on horses and letting it ride in Las Vegas.
| 134 | 23 | "Funny, You Don't Look It" | Russ Petranto | Rabbi Joseph Feinstein | March 11, 1977 | 134 (623) |
Inspired by Alex Haley's "Roots," Fred orders a family crest and genealogical scroll that states he's African royalty and a descendant of the Jewish Ethiopian Falashas.
| 135 | 24 | "Fred Sings the Blues" | Russ Petranto | Larry Mintz and Alan Eisenstock | March 18, 1977 | 135 (624) |
Fred invites B.B. King to dinner at Sanford home and may give the famous singer another reason to sing the blues. B.B. King Guest stars.
| 136 | 25 | "School Daze" | Carl McCarthy | Rick Mittleman | March 25, 1977 | 136 (625) |
For a month Fred and Bubba have been sneaking out at night, concerning family and friends and leading Donna to fear that Fred has fallen for another woman. NOTE: School Daze was the final episode of the series due to the departure of Redd Foxx, who elected to star in a variety show rather than return for another season; Sanford Arms (continuing the idea of operating the rooming house next to the junkyard) was originally intended to feature Demond Wilson, but he left in a salary dispute. In 1980, Foxx returned in Sanford (Wilson refused to appear), which ran for two seasons.
