= Theodore Wilson =

American actor (1943–1991)

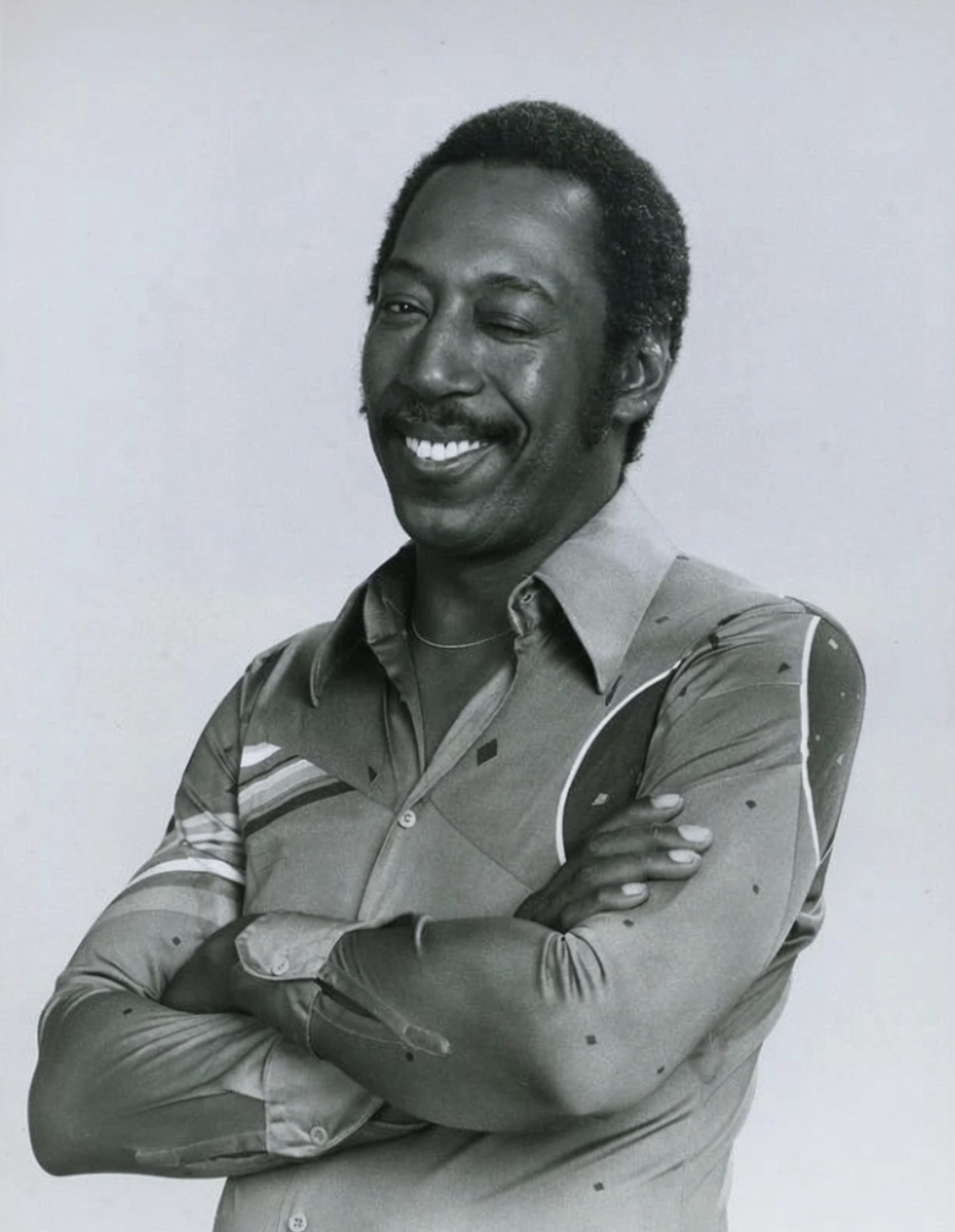
- Wilson in Sanford Arms, 1977
- Born: Theodore Rosevelt Wilson; December 10, 1943; New York City, U.S.
- Died: July 21, 1991 (aged 47); Los Angeles, California, U.S.
- Other name: Teddy Wilson
- Education: Florida A&M University
- Occupation: Actor
- Years active: 1970–1991
- Children: 3

Theodore Rosevelt Wilson (December 10, 1943 – July 21, 1991) was an American stage, film, and television actor. He is best known for his recurring roles as Earl the Postman on the ABC sitcom That's My Mama, and Sweet Daddy Williams on the CBS sitcom Good Times and Phil Wheeler on the NBC sitcom Sanford Arms (1977). Throughout his television and film career, Wilson was credited interchangeably with either Theodore (36) or Teddy (50) as his given name.

== Career ==
Born in Harlem, New York City, Wilson studied music at Florida A&M University before switching to drama. Upon returning to New York, he joined the Negro Ensemble Company and later worked with the Arena Stage Repertory. He made his acting debut in the blaxploitation film Cotton Comes to Harlem, in 1970. The following year, Wilson left New York City and moved to Los Angeles to further his acting career. He made his television debut in a two-episode role as Hawthorne Dooley on the television series The Waltons. In 1973, Wilson was cast as the character High Strung on the CBS sitcom Roll Out. The series was canceled after 12 episodes. The following year, Wilson was cast as Earl Chambers, a postman on the sitcom That's My Mama. That series ran for two seasons on ABC. Wilson also starred in national TV commercials for Aamco in the 1970s as a character named "Walter T." Wilson appeared as CWO2 Martin H. Williams, a chopper pilot and buddy of characters Trapper and Hawkeye in the Season 3 episode of M*A*S*H titled "The General Flipped at Dawn" (1974).

In September 1976, Wilson was offered and signed a contract with Tandem Productions, the production company owned by Bud Yorkin and Norman Lear, who produced some of the most popular television sitcoms of the 1970s. Wilson went on to guest star in several Yorkin/Lear-produced series including All in the Family, Sanford and Son, What's Happening!!, The Jeffersons, and 13 Queens Boulevard. In 1976, Wilson was cast as Sweet Daddy Williams, a street hustler on the CBS sitcom Good Times. His character of Sweet Daddy appeared in a recurring role. In August 1977, it was announced that Wilson would star in a spin-off series of the hit sitcom Sanford and Son called Sanford Arms. Sanford and Son had ended in March 1977 when star Redd Foxx left the series. Sanford Arms was intended to be a continuation of that highly popular series. In Sanford Arms, Wilson starred as Phil Wheeler, an Army veteran and widower who has purchased the Sanford Arms, a rooming house, from his old Army buddy Fred G. Sanford, the Foxx character from Sanford and Son. Upon its premiere in September 1977, Sanford Arms was met with low ratings and was canceled after four episodes.

After the series was canceled, Wilson made various TV guest appearances in episodes of The White Shadow (he also wrote a 1980 episode), Enos, Gimme a Break!, The Golden Girls, and What's Happening Now. In 1986, he had a role as Jim-Jam on another short-lived series, The Redd Foxx Show. Wilson continued to work throughout the late 1980s and early 1990s, appearing in Alien Nation, Dallas, Family Matters, Tales from the Crypt, Gabriel's Fire, Mama's Family, and Quantum Leap. He was also featured in several motion pictures including The Hunter (1980), Blake Edwards's A Fine Mess, That's Life! (both 1986), and Mel Brooks's Life Stinks (1991). Wilson made his last onscreen appearance in Blood In Blood Out, a 1993 crime drama released after his death.

== Personal life ==
Wilson had three children, Theodore Jr., Robert and Nicole. The latter two children were with his wife, actress Joan Pringle, Wilson's co-star during the second season of the television series That's My Mama. Pringle was named executrix of Wilson's estate when he died in 1991.

== Death ==
On July 21, 1991, Wilson died of complications from a stroke at Cedars-Sinai Medical Center in Los Angeles, at the age of 47. He had undergone open-heart surgery several years prior to his death.

== Filmography ==
Film
Year	Title	Role	Notes
1970	Cotton Comes to Harlem	Barry	
1972	Come Back, Charleston Blue	Cemetery Guard	
1973	Cleopatra Jones	Pickle (Doodlebug's hood)	
1974	Newman's Law	Lindy	
1974	Black Eye	Jaycee	
1976	The River Niger	Chips	
1976	Gang Wars	Black Spade	
1977	The Greatest	Joe, the Gardener	Credited as Theodore R. Wilson
1977	Run for the Roses	Flash	
1978	Loose Shoes	Elijah Abdoul Jamaal Muhammed	a.k.a. Coming Attractions, a.k.a. Quackers
1980	Carny	Nails	
1980	The Hunter	Winston Blue	
1984	Weekend Pass	Nat	
1986	Big Trouble	Porter	
1986	Stewardess School	Probation Officer	
1986	A Fine Mess	Covington	
1986	That's Life!	Corey	
1987	Maid to Order	Woodrow	
1990	Genuine Risk	Billy	
1990	Penny Ante: The Motion Picture	Willie	
1991	Life Stinks	Fumes	a.k.a. Life Sucks, posthumous release
1992	The Vagrant	X-Rays	Posthumous release
1993	Blood In Blood Out	Wallace	a.k.a. Bound by Honor, posthumous release (final film role)

Television
Year	Title	Role	Notes
1972–73	The Waltons	Hawthorne Dooley	2 episodes
1973	The Partridge Family	Sam Mulvoney	Episode: "Hate Thy Neighbor"
1973	Roll Out	High Strung	Recurring role
1974	M*A*S*H	Warrant Officer Martin "Marty" Williams	Episode: "The General Flipped at Dawn"
1974–75	That's My Mama	Earl Chambers	Main cast
1975	Medical Story	Hadley	Television movie
1976	Baretta	Flash	Episode: "Pay or Die"
1976	Good Heavens	Special Bingham	Episode: "Jack the Ribber and Me"
1976–79	Good Times	Sweet Daddy Williams / Stanley Byrd	7 episodes
1977	Phyllis	Jimmy Carter	Episode: "Boss or Buddy or Both or Neither"
1977	The Bionic Woman	Warner Williams	Episode: "Iron Ships and Dead Men"
1977	Sanford Arms	Phil Wheeler	Main cast
1977	Kojak	Joe Penney	Episode: "Once More from Birdland"
1977	Police Woman	Harold Martin	Episode: "Shadow of a Doubt"
1976–78	What's Happening!!	Al Dunbar / Marty / Mr. Wilson	4 episodes
1979	The Dukes of Hazzard	Morgan	Episode: "Route 7-11"
1979	The White Shadow	Doug Buchanan	Episode: "A Christmas Present"
1981	The Oklahoma City Dolls	Tom Petree	Television movie
1982	The Ambush Murders	Jay King	Television movie
1983	Amanda's	Philip Oliver	Episode: "Last of the Red Hot Brothers"
1985	A Bunny's Tale	Older Club Employee	Television movie
1985	Malice in Wonderland	Collins	Television movie
1985	What's Happening Now!!	Mr. Lee/Bum	2 episodes
1985	The Twilight Zone	Henderson	Segment: "Night of the Meek"
1985	Crazy Like a Fox	Eddie	2 episodes
1986	The Golden Girls	Albert, the Diner Owner	Episode "Twas the Nightmare Before Christmas (20 Dec. 1986)"
1986	227	Cousin Ray	Episode: "We the People"
1986	The Redd Foxx Show	Jim-Jam	Main cast, replaced a different actor after third episode
1986	Easy Street	Jackie	Episode: "Be-Bop Man"
1987	The New Mike Hammer	Booker	Episode: "Body Shot"
1987	Cagney & Lacey	Judge Charnas	Episode: "Easy Does It"
1987	Gimme a Break!	Rev George Dixon	Episode: "Save The Church"
1987–88	You Can't Take It with You	Durwood M. Pinner	3 episodes
1988	Annie McGuire	Jordan	Episode: "The Journey"
1988	The Golden Girls	Ben	Episode: "Brother, Can You Spare That Jacket?"
1989	Mama's Family	Gus	Episode: "More Power to You"
1989	Sweet Bird of Youth	Fly	Television movie
1989	Midnight Caller	Quinton Oliver	Episode: "Take Back the Streets"
1989	Alien Nation	Dr. Roscoe Brennan	2 episodes
1989	The Munsters Today	Louis	Episode: "The Melting Pot"
1989–90	Dallas	Clem	2 episodes
1990	Beauty and the Beast	Raymond Ensign	Episode: "Legacies"
1990	Family Matters	Captain Casper Davenport	Episode: "Sitting Pretty"
1990	The New Adam-12	Street Artist	Episode: "The Landlord"
1990	Tales from the Crypt	Clyde	Episode: "Fitting Punishment"
1990	Quantum Leap	Ernie Tyler / Jimmy Grady	Episodes: "Rebel Without a Clue" / "Pool Hall Blues"
1991	Wings	John	Episode: "Plane Nine from Nantucket"
