= Tandem Productions =

American television production company

- Type: Subsidiary (1982–1986)
- Industry: Television production
- Founded: 1958; 68 years ago
- Founders: Norman Lear; Bud Yorkin
- Defunct: 1986; 40 years ago
- Fate: Dormancy; operations folded alongside Embassy Television and Embassy Telecommunications
- Successor: Embassy Communications
- Headquarters: United States
- Owner: The Coca-Cola Company (1985–1986)
- Parent: Embassy Communications (1982–1986)

Tandem Productions, Inc. (a.k.a. Tandem Enterprises, Inc.) was a film and television production company that was founded in 1958 by television director Bud Yorkin and television writer/producer Norman Lear.

== History ==
=== Tandem Productions ===
In the early years, Yorkin and Lear initially established Tandem specifically for television production. The name was chosen because when launching their company, Yorkin and Lear were said to feel like two men riding uphill on a tandem bicycle. The company produced several variety and dramatic television specials such as the Fred Astaire specials, Henry Fonda and the Family, An Evening with Carol Channing and The Scene '66, to name a few. Tandem was also at hand for various unsold pilots throughout the 1950s and 1960s, including Henry T., Meet Me at Danny's and Barnaby (not to be confused with Barnaby Jones). The company also financed the production of theatrical films, some of which were released by Warner Bros. Pictures, Paramount Pictures, Columbia Pictures, and United Artists.

Lear and Yorkin later turned their focus on situation comedy. The first success in that genre was All in the Family, which was based on the British sitcom Till Death Us Do Part. Before the series made its debut on January 12, 1971, Yorkin and Lear shot two unsold pilots for the series: one in 1968 called Justice For All and the other in 1969 titled Those Were the Days. Production for the series began in late 1970, following the third pilot episode which was picked up by CBS. More successful shows were also produced by Tandem; they were Maude (1972–1978), Good Times (1974–1979), and finally Sanford and Son (1972–1977). In 1997, the Television Academy Foundation stated that Tandem Productions' "major sitcom factories of the 1970s" used the same "new narrative ground" which had been also used for Room 222. In 1977, Viacom Enterprises secured domestic and international television syndication rights for All in the Family which hit off-network reruns in Fall 1979. Columbia Pictures Television took over distribution for the series by 1991.

In 1978, Tandem produced Diff'rent Strokes, which was the first show not to be produced by Yorkin nor Lear; previous to that, the company produced a pilot for a Little Rascals TV series-one of the stars of that pilot, Gary Coleman, would end up on Diff'rent Strokes as Arnold. Archie Bunker's Place was produced in 1979, Sanford in 1980 and Gloria, the final series to be produced by Tandem in 1982. Not many more shows were produced under the Tandem name, but many other shows were being produced under T.A.T. Communications Company during the early 1980's. Also in 1978, Tandem Productions launched P*I*T*S Films (an acronym which stands for "Pie In The Sky") as its television distribution arm for its parent company's programs (All in the Family was excluded, which at the time was distributed by Viacom). P*I*T*S Films was reincorporated as Embassy Telecommunications in 1982.

=== Bud Yorkin Productions and TOY Productions ===
After Yorkin ended his partnership with Lear in 1975, he collaborated with writers and producers Saul Turteltaub and Bernie Orenstein (who wrote some episodes and produced Sanford and Son from 1974 to 1977) and established Bud Yorkin Productions, Inc. He still remained as the executive producer of the series.

The first sitcom was Grady, a Sanford and Son spin-off starring Whitman Mayo. The series was canceled after ten episodes due to low ratings.

In 1976, Yorkin, Turteltaub, and Orenstein established TOY Productions, and the first sitcom for the new company was ABC's What's Happening!!. The series was suggested by the American International Picture Cooley High, written by Eric Monte.

In mid-February 1979, TOY was acquired by Columbia Pictures Television and launched a new series, 13 Queens Boulevard. A year later, they co-produced the short-lived sitcom One in a Million, starring Shirley Hemphill.

Two years later, TOY produced another sitcom, One of the Boys. It received negative reception, and after it was cancelled on April 24, 1982, TOY was folded.

Despite forming his own production company, Yorkin stayed on board with Tandem as executive vice president.

=== 1980s ===
After Norman Lear bought Avco Embassy Pictures, he dropped the name "Avco" and reincorporated T.A.T. Communications as Embassy Television. All series that were still produced by T.A.T. (such as The Facts of Life, The Jeffersons, and One Day at a Time) were produced under the Embassy name. All shows by Tandem Productions that were off the air were distributed by Embassy Telecommunications.

In 1983, Ken Stump, the former associate producer for Tandem Productions and T.A.T. Communications, was made in charge of production for Tandem Productions and Embassy Television. The same year in June, Lear and Perenchio bought out Yorkin's interest in Tandem.

On June 18, 1985, Norman Lear and Jerry Perenchio sold Embassy Communications, Inc. to The Coca-Cola Company for $485 million. A few months later, Coke sold Embassy Pictures to Dino De Laurentiis since De Laurentiis wanted to start releasing his movies through his own studio. Coke's plan was to keep the television division and to spin off the other labels that weren't part of the deal.

De Laurentiis later reorganized Embassy Pictures as De Laurentiis Entertainment Group. The majority of the motion picture holdings are currently owned by StudioCanal. However, Columbia Pictures retains Crimewave and Saving Grace. SPE also holds the television rights to the Avco Embassy film The Fog (1980).

After the sale of Embassy, CPT also produced the sitcom What's Happening Now!!, in association with LBS Communications. The same year, Diff'rent Strokes moved to ABC from NBC after NBC cancelled the series. While Tandem Productions remained active, Embassy Communications launched Tandem Licensing Corp. as Tandem's licensing division.

In 1986, Diff'rent Strokes was cancelled due to low ratings. Immediately afterwards, the operations of Embassy Television, Embassy Telecommunications, and Tandem Productions were all folded into Embassy Communications. By this point, Embassy Communications became strictly a television studio, even merging with Columbia Pictures Television to form Columbia/Embassy Television in November 1986. However, Tandem Licensing Corp. remains legally active as an in-name-only unit of Sony Pictures Television.

== TV programs ==
=== Tandem Productions ===
- All in the Family (1971–1979)
- Maude (1972–1978)
- Sanford and Son (1972–1977)
- Good Times (1974–1979)
- Sanford Arms (1977)
- Diff'rent Strokes (1978–1986)
- Archie Bunker's Place (1979–1983)
- Sanford (1980–1981)
- Gloria (1982–1983)

=== TOY Productions ===
- Grady (1975–1976)
- What's Happening!! (1976–1979)
- Carter Country (1977–1979)
- 13 Queens Boulevard (1979)
- One in a Million (1980)
- One of the Boys (1982)

== Theatrical movies ==
- Come Blow Your Horn (1963, as Essex-Tandem; distributed by Paramount Pictures)
- Never Too Late (1965; distributed by Warner Bros. Pictures)
- Divorce American Style (1967, as Tandem Enterprises, Inc.; distributed by Columbia Pictures)
- The Night They Raided Minsky's (1968, distributed by United Artists)
- Start the Revolution Without Me (1970, as Norbud Productions; distributed by Warner Bros. Pictures)
- Cold Turkey (1971; distributed by United Artists)
- The Thief Who Came to Dinner (1973; distributed by Warner Bros. Pictures)

== Notable actors and actresses ==
Some actors and actresses have appeared across various television programs.

- John Amos (Tandem)
- Marla Gibbs (ELP)
- Esther Rolle (Tandem)
- Demond Wilson (Tandem)
- Carroll O'Connor (Tandem)
- Ernest Lee Thomas (TOY)
- Todd Bridges (Tandem, TOY, and ELP)
- LaWanda Page (Tandem and ELP)
- Kim Fields (Tandem and ELP)
- Gary Coleman (Tandem and ELP)
- Charlotte Rae (Tandem and ELP)
- Nathaniel Taylor Jr. (Tandem and TOY)
- Whitman Mayo (Tandem and ELP)
- Hal Williams (Tandem, TOY, and ELP)
- Helen Martin (Tandem, TOY, and ELP)
- Isabel Sanford (Tandem and ELP)
- Sherman Hemsley (Tandem and ELP)
- Michael Evans (Tandem and ELP)
- Jean Stapleton (Tandem and ELP)
- Sally Struthers (Tandem)
- Theodore Wilson (Tandem, TOY, and ELP)
- Conrad Bain (Tandem and ELP)
