= Raymond Allen (television actor) =

American actor (1929–2020)

- Born: Raymond Gilmore Allen; March 5, 1929; Kansas City, Missouri, U.S.
- Died: August 10, 2020 (aged 91); California, U.S.
- Occupation: Actor
- Years active: 1946–1985
- Known for: Woodrow "Woody" Anderson – Sanford and Son; Ned the Wino – Good Times
- Spouse: Barbara Williams (m. 1963–1977)
- Children: 3

Raymond Gilmore Allen (March 5, 1929 – August 10, 2020) was an American television actor. He was known for his appearances on television during the 1970s. He had recurring roles as Ned the Wino on Good Times, as Aunt Esther's husband, Woodrow "Woody" Anderson on the NBC sitcom Sanford and Son, and as mechanic Merle the Earl on Starsky and Hutch. He reprised his role as Uncle Woody Anderson in the Sanford and Son spin-off, The Sanford Arms. Allen also made guest appearances on The Jeffersons, What's Happening!!, The Love Boat, and the film Wattstax.

== Life ==
Although he had not appeared in any acting roles since 1985, as his last appearance was from the television film Gus Brown and Midnight Brewster. He continued making public appearances where he spoke and signed autographs. According to his MySpace page, he was forced to retire from acting due to illness. Allen was married to Barbara Williams from 1963 to 1977; they had three children who include daughters Ta-Ronce Allen and Brenda Allen, as well as son Raymond Gilmore Allen Jr. (deceased).

== Death ==
Allen died in August 2020 from a respiratory illness in California, at the age of 91. His daughter, Ta-Ronce Allen confirmed the news on her Facebook page.

== Filmography ==
Year	Title	Role	Notes
1946	Fight That Ghost	Fast Delivery Bill	
1973	Mean Mother	Opening Scene Henchman	
1975	Darktown Strutters	Six Bits	
