= Dennis Burkley =

American actor (1945–2013)

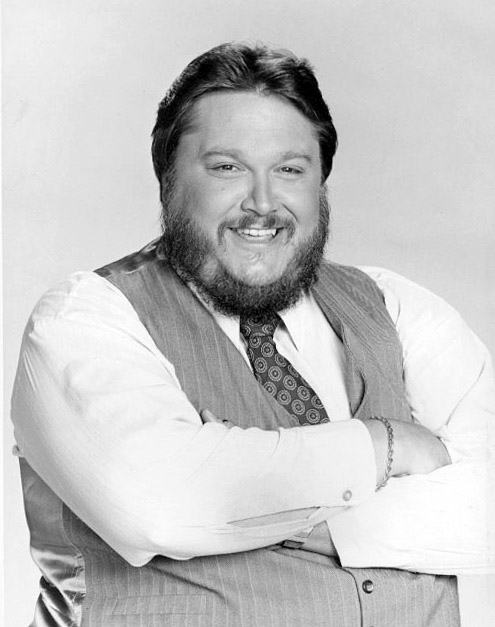
- Burkley in 1979
- Born: September 10, 1945; Los Angeles, California, U.S.
- Died: July 14, 2013 (aged 67); Los Angeles, California, U.S.
- Occupation: Actor
- Years active: 1973–2013
- Spouse: Laura Alderdice (m. 1967)
- Children: 2

Dennis Henry Burkley (September 10, 1945 – July 14, 2013) was an American actor. In a career spanning four decades, he appeared in numerous films and television series. He is best known for his role as Principal Carl Moss in King of the Hill.

== Early life ==
Burkley was born in Los Angeles, California, the son of Imogene (née Ware) and Henry Burkley. He grew up in Grand Prairie, Texas, and graduated from Texas Christian University.

== Career ==
In his 1980s and 1990s appearances, Burkley was most recognizable for his large 6 ft 3 in (1.91 m) and 300 lb (140 kg) frame, scruffy beard, and Southern accent.

In the 1970s, he established himself as a television character actor with appearances on many programs, including Mary Hartman, Mary Hartman, Maude, the Rockford Files, and Quincy, M.E.. In the 1980s, he came into his own as an actor with a high profile role on Hill Street Blues and another memorable role as Cal, the Texas-born junkyard partner of Fred G. Sanford in Sanford, the short-lived Sanford and Son sequel from 1980 to 1981. He provided the voice of several supporting characters on the animated television series King of the Hill (set in his home state of Texas), most notably Principal Moss. In 2005, he wrote and directed a film titled Repetition and also played a small role in the television series My Name Is Earl.

In films, he played Dozer, a biker with a severe speech impediment who befriends Rocky Dennis and his mother in the movie Mask. Burkley appeared in the drug culture drama Rush in 1991, the Chevy Chase comedy Fletch Lives, and Sylvester Stallone's Stop! Or My Mom Will Shoot. He appeared in the Kevin Costner golf comedy Tin Cup. Other movies included The Doors and Murphy's Romance.

== Personal life ==
Burkley was married to Laura Alderdice from 1967 until his death. They had two children.

Burkley died of a heart attack in Los Angeles, California, on July 14, 2013, at the age of 67.

== Filmography ==
=== Film ===
| Year | Title | Role | Notes |
|---|---|---|---|
| 1973 | Bummer! | Butts | |
| 1974 | Nightmare Honeymoon | Bubba | |
| 1976 | Stay Hungry | Heavy #2 | |
| 1976 | The Call of the Wild | 'Stoney' | TV movie |
| 1977 | Heroes | Gus | |
| 1978 | Laserblast | Deputy Pete Ungar | |
| 1985 | Mask | Dozer | |
| 1985 | The Slugger's Wife | Chuck | |
| 1985 | Murphy's Romance | Freeman Coverly | |
| 1986 | Stewardess School | 'Snake' Pellino | |
| 1987 | Wanted: Dead or Alive | Farnsworth | |
| 1987 | Malone | Dan Bollard | |
| 1987 | Who's That Girl | Benny | |
| 1987 | No Way Out | Mate | |
| 1988 | Pass the Ammo | Joe 'Big Joe' Becker | |
| 1989 | Fletch Lives | Joe Jack | |
| 1989 | An Innocent Man | Butcher | |
| 1990 | Lambada | Uncle Big | |
| 1990 | The End of Innocence | 'Tiny' | |
| 1991 | The Doors | 'Dog' | |
| 1991 | Suburban Commando | Deak | |
| 1991 | Rush | Motorcycle Guy | |
| 1992 | Stop! Or My Mom Will Shoot | Mitchell | |
| 1992 | Wishman | Max 'The Squealer' | |
| 1992 | Four Eyes and Six Guns | Luke Doom | TV movie |
| 1992 | Sidekicks | Hank | |
| 1992 | Beyond the Law | 'Oatmeal' | |
| 1993 | Son in Law | Theo | |
| 1995 | Eye of the Stalker | Danny Zerbo | Private investigator |
| 1996 | Tin Cup | Earl | |
| 1996 | Cheyenne | Knopfler | |
| 1997 | Touch | Hillbilly | |
| 1997 | Fathers' Day | Calvin | |
| 1997 | Con Air | Dale, The Bartender | Uncredited |
| 1998 | Possums | Orville Moss | |
| 1998 | The First 9½ Weeks | Sheriff Marlon Tolette | Direct-to-video film |
| 2000 | Vice | Sergeant Hunt | |
| 2001 | Knight Club | Redneck | |
| 2001 | Wish You Were Dead | Sam Daniels | |
| 2003 | Pauly Shore Is Dead | Celebrity Judge #3 | |
| 2003 | Hollywood Homicide | Hank, The Bartender | |
| 2005 | Repetition | Teacher | |
| 2005 | Keep Your Distance | Gus | |

=== Television ===
| Year | Title | Role | Notes |
|---|---|---|---|
| 1973 | ”Emergency” | Biker | Episode: “Frequency” |
| 1976 | Starsky & Hutch | Eddie Bell | Episode: "Omaha Tiger" |
| 1976 | Family | Roy Axelrod | Episode: "Point of Departure" |
| 1976 | McCloud | 'Big Mama' | Episode: "Bonnie and McCloud" |
| 1976 | One Day at a Time | Photographer | Episode: "The Maestro" |
| 1976–1978 | Maude | Sam Dickey | 3 episodes |
| 1976–1979 | The Rockford Files | Thomas 'Animal' Nicholas / Bartender / Howard | 3 episodes |
| 1977 | Eight Is Enough | Buff Cody | Episode: "Mortgage Burnin' Blues" |
| 1977 | Quincy, M.E. | Thomas 'Tom-Tom' Tomlinson | Episode: "No Deadly Secret" |
| 1977–1978 | Mary Hartman, Mary Hartman | Mac Slattery | 85 episodes |
| 1978 | Baretta | Ronco | Episode: "It's a Boy" |
| 1979 | B.J. and the Bear | Harry Cunningham | Episodes: "Lobo's revenge" and "Lobo" |
| 1979 | Hanging In | Sam Dickey | 2 episodes |
| 1980 | The Dukes of Hazzard | Bubba | Episode: "Find Loretta Lynn" |
| 1980 | The Misadventures of Sheriff Lobo | Harry Cunningham | Episode: "Police Escort" |
| 1980–1981 | Sanford | Cal Pettie | 26 episodes |
| 1981 | The Greatest American Hero | Preacher | Episode: "Hog Wild" |
| 1982 | Gimme a Break! | Dr. George Avery | Episode: "Porko's II" |
| 1983 | Amanda's | Billy Rae | Episode: "The Man Who Came on Wednesday" |
| 1983 | Hill Street Blues | Sonny Crockett | 4 episodes |
| 1983 | Scarecrow and Mrs. King | Earl Dowd | Episode: "Always Look a Gift Horse in the Mouth" |
| 1984 | Night Court | 'Cannibal' | Episode: "The Blizzard" |
| 1985 | The Dukes of Hazzard | Mickey Larsen | Episode: "Strange Visitor to Hazzard" |
| 1986 | Who's the Boss? | 'Pee Wee' | Episode: "When Worlds Collide" |
| 1987 | Outlaws | Farmer | Episode: "Primer" |
| 1989 | Who's the Boss? | 'Pee Wee' | Episode: "Tony and the Professor" |
| 1991 | The New WKRP in Cincinnati | Jocko | Episodes: "Here Comes Everybody" Parts 1 & 2 |
| 1991 | Designing Women | Buford | Episode: "The Pride of Sugarbakers" |
| 1991 | Carol & Company | The Game Devil | Episode: "Myna and the Messenger" |
| 1993 | Family Matters | Repairman | Episode: "An Officer and a Waldo" |
| 1994 | The Fresh Prince of Bel-Air | Hatfield McCoy | Episode: "Fresh Prince: The Movie" |
| 1995 | ER | Tom Perry | Episode: "What Life?" |
| 1996 | NYPD Blue | Ernie 'Pig' | Episode: "Auntie Maimed" |
| 1996 | Renegade | 'Smokey' | Episode: "Self Defense" |
| 1996 | Dave's World | Rude Guy | Episode: "Missed Manners" |
| 1996 | High Incident | Detective Cryer | Episode: "Who'll Stop the Bombs?" |
| 1996 | Baywatch Nights | Horace Calhoun | Episode: "The Cabin" |
| 1997 | Coach | Joe Bob | Episode: "A Boy and His Doll" |
| 1997 | Living Single | Jonathan Remington | Episode: "The Clown That Roared" |
| 1997 | Pacific Blue | D.W. McQueen | Episode: "Inside Straight" |
| 1997 | The Visitor | Louie | Episode: "Caged" |
| 1998 | Tracey Takes On... | Fat Detective | Episode: "Religion" |
| 1998 | JAG | Larry 'Jungle Larry' | Episode: "Yesterday's Heroes" |
| 1998 | Players | Sonny | Episode: "Con-tinental" |
| 1998 | Home Improvement | Larry | Episode: "Tim's First Car" |
| 1998 | Martial Law | Warden Jalouse | Episode: "Lock-Up" |
| 1999 | The Jamie Foxx Show | Duke | Episode: "Bro-Jack" |
| 2000 | The Magnificent Seven | Horace | Episode: "Serpents" |
| 2000 | The Fugitive | Bill | Episode: "Guilt" |
| 2001 | The Drew Carey Show | Biker #3 | Episode: "Drew and the Motorcycle" |
| 2001 | Dead Last | Unknown | Episode: "Laughlin It Up" |
| 2002 | Reba | Fred | Episode: "He's Having a Baby" |
| 2005 | The Exonerated | Sheriff Carroll | TV movie |
| 2005–2008 | My Name Is Earl | Junkyard Owner / Roy Wade / Impound Owner | 3 episodes |
| 1997–2010 | King of the Hill | Principal Moss / Carl | Voice, 35 episodes |
