= Alex Hacker =

Alex Hacker may refer to:

- Alex Hacker, character in List of Sanford and Son episodes
- Alex Hacker, character in The Ambassador (1984 American film)
