= Sanford Arms =

American sitcom

- Based on: Steptoe and Son created by Ray Galton; Alan Simpson
- Developed by: Norman Lear (uncredited)
- Starring: Theodore Wilson; Tina Andrews; John Earl; Don Bexley; Bebe Drake; LaWanda Page; Whitman Mayo
- Opening theme: Henry Mancini
- Country of origin: United States
- Original language: English
- No. of seasons: 1
- No. of episodes: 8 (4 Aired, 4 Unaired)

Production
- Executive producers: Bernie Orenstein; Saul Turteltaub; Bud Yorkin
- Camera setup: Multi-camera
- Running time: 22–24 minutes
- Production company: Tandem Productions

Original release
- Network: NBC
- Release: September 16 – October 14, 1977

Related
- Sanford and Son; Sanford

Sanford Arms is an American sitcom television series produced as a spin-off and continuation of Sanford and Son, that aired on NBC from September 16 to October 14, 1977.

After six seasons, Redd Foxx left Sanford and Son to star in a variety show for ABC. The producers planned to continue the series with Demond Wilson as Lamont, but Wilson left the project in a dispute over his expected salary as the star of the series. The producers decided to continue the project with a new character. Norman Lear stepped down from his position as executive producer but stayed on as a consultant.

== Premise ==
The new lead character was Phil Wheeler (Theodore Wilson), a widower and old Army buddy of Fred Sanford. It was explained that Fred and Lamont had moved to Arizona and they sold their property to Phil. Phil now lived in the Sanfords' old house in Los Angeles, with his two teenage children, Angie and Nat. The primary setting of the series, however, was the rooming house next door that Fred named "The Sanford Arms". Fred and Lamont bought the house in the penultimate season of the original series. The new series focused on Phil's attempts to turn the rooming house into a successful hotel.

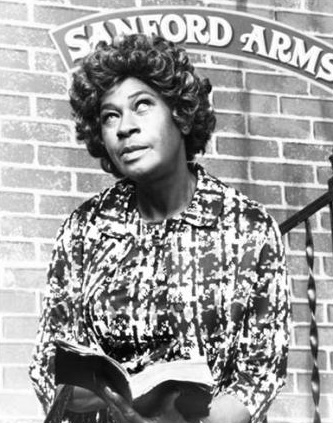
LaWanda Page on Sanford Arms (1977)

Most of the recurring characters from the original series also starred in this series. Grady (Whitman Mayo) was now married to his girlfriend Dolly (who appeared in an episode of the original series). Bubba (Don Bexley) now worked at the Sanford Arms as a bellman and a maintenance man. Aunt Esther (LaWanda Page) was left in charge helping Phil and collecting the mortgage payments. Rounding out the cast of characters was Phil's girlfriend, Jeannie.

The attempt to continue a popular series without its two main stars turned out to be a failure. The ratings were low and the show was cancelled after four episodes. When Redd Foxx returned to television as Fred Sanford in the 1980–1981 short-lived spinoff Sanford, the events of Sanford Arms were completely ignored.

== Episodes ==
No.	Title	Directed by	Written by	Original release date
1	"Bye, Fred, Hi, Phil"	Russ Petranto	Bernie Orenstein, Saul Turteltaub	September 16, 1977
Fred and Lamont are gone, and Phil Wheeler takes control of "The Sanford Arms" hotel. Grady and his new wife Dolly (from Sanford and Son, "Grady and His Lady") check in to spend their honeymoon at the Sanford Arms, while Phil and Bubba try to find a way to come up with the rent money for the month. When Grady and Dolly check in, it is explained that Fred and Lamont moved to Arizona due to Fred's health.
2	"Phil's Assertion School"	Dick Harwood	S : Gene Farmer; S/T : David Panich	September 23, 1977
Phil's plan to teach people to be more assertive backfires when a student decides to sue him. The matter is worked out when Phil, with the help of one of his daughter's friends, gets the student to realize he can be assertive.
3	"The Grandparents"	Russ Petranto	T : Robert J. Hillard; S/T : Woody Kling	September 30, 1977
Nathaniel's grandparents come for a visit. As usual, they pester Phil to allow Nat to come and live with them in their upscale home in San Diego, reasoning that Watts is no place to raise a 12-year-old boy. Nat decides to go and live with his grandparents—but only to prove to them they are too old to handle a child of his age.
4	"Phil's Past"	Dick Harwood	S : Ron Landry, Jim Mulligan; T : Gene Farmer	October 14, 1977
To Esther's dismay, Phil tries to obtain a liquor license for The Sanford Arms. His attempts are halted when a past incident stands in his way.
5	"The TV Show"	Dick Harwood	Gene Farmer	unaired
The Sanford Arms is chosen as the site for a TV show.
6	"Young Love"	Russ Petranto	Rick Mittleman	unaired
One of Phil's children falls in love.
7	"The Wedding Reception"	Russ Petranto	Woody Kling	unaired
Angie and Nat plan a wedding for Phil and Jeannie
8	"The Ernie Williams Memorial Golf Course"	Dick Harwood	Lan O'Kun	unaired
Phil plays golf at a course named after Ernie Williams.

== Syndication ==
Sanford Arms was not included in the syndication package with Sanford and Son. Eight episodes had been produced, but the final four episodes did not air before the series' abrupt cancellation. In 1991, BET aired reruns of the series. In 2019, CHCH, a Canadian rerun channel, picked up the series for reruns, airing 6 of the 8 episodes, these 6 episodes are included as season 7 of Sanford and Son for streaming online through CTV.

== Bibliography ==
- Margulies, Lee (October 5, 1977). "NBC Gives the Ax to Sanford Arms". Los Angeles Times. p. H14. Archived from the original on June 4, 2011.
