= Grady Wilson (Sanford and Son) =

Fictional character

Grady Wilson is the name of a fictional recurring character on the NBC sitcom Sanford and Son played by Whitman Mayo. The character's name first appeared in the 1972 episode "The Dowry"; however, in this episode he was played by Albert Reed Jr. and he was Fred's cousin. Once Mayo took the role, Grady became a regular on the show.

== Character history ==
Grady is a friend of Fred Sanford (Redd Foxx), the main character of "Sanford and Son", a junk and antique business in Watts. Grady is portrayed as an elderly man, known for his stooped appearance and his gray hair and beard. He is most commonly seen wearing an oversized, pale-blue sport coat and walks with a slow shuffle. He often stops by Fred's house to drink and play cards, and he regularly accompanies Fred in his various schemes, much to the chagrin of Fred's son Lamont. He is sometimes referred to by Fred as "Crazy Grady" (a nickname that would be referenced in the 1996 pilot of Malcolm & Eddie).

Grady is extremely absent-minded and regularly forgets the names of people he knows—especially Lamont, who is Grady's godson. When Grady asks him his name, Lamont often responds by sarcastically giving him a similar name (such as "Lucas" or "Lawrence"), which Grady then acknowledges. (Grady is named after Demond Wilson, the actor who played Lamont on the series. His full name is Grady Demond Wilson.) He frequently confuses certain words, upon hearing them, for anything similar-sounding (such as referring to the "munchies" as "Munchkins"). Grady often refers to his old age, or his impending death, or the deaths of his and Fred's associates. He also frequently inadvertently insults Fred's sister-in-law Esther, by telling her something Fred has said about her. He is often easily alarmed or surprised, and when excited, he is known to exclaim his catch phrases, "Good goobily goop!" or "Great googly moogly!". Grady also has a habit of being easily upset, usually when complimented, accidentally offended or hearing of illness or impending death striking a friend, sobbing uncontrollably and blowing his nose loudly (Fred often responds to this by telling him irritably "Don't do that, you gonna blow somethin' outta your head that you need!")

For a time during the series' run, Fred was "out of town" (due to a salary dispute between Foxx and NBC), leaving Grady in charge of Fred's business, effectively making Grady the main character on the show. During Fred's absence, Grady moved into Fred's house, and also took over the role of Lamont's comic foil. Like Fred before him, he also quite frequently ran afoul of Lamont's formidable Aunt Esther.

Grady appeared on Sanford and Son from 1973 until 1977. During this time, Mayo also starred in a TV series about the character, Grady. In this series, Grady moves out of Watts to live with his daughter. The show was short-lived, and he eventually returned to Sanford and Son. Mayo reprised the role of Grady again in the show's short-lived spin-off The Sanford Arms, in which Grady is married to his former girlfriend, Dolly. Mayo reprised his role again as a guest star on Sanford.
