= Esther Anderson (Sanford and Son) =

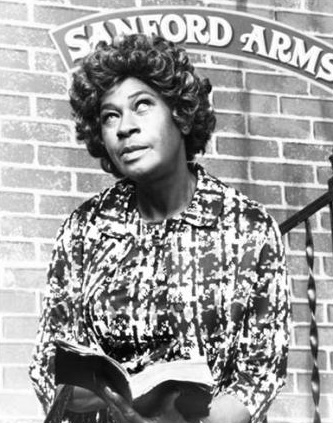
- Esther Winfield-Anderson
- First appearance: "The Big Party" (Sanford and Son)
- Last appearance: "Here Comes the Bride: Part 2" (Sanford)
- Created by: Norman Lear and Bud Yorkin, based on Albert Steptoe created by Galton and Simpson
- Portrayed by: LaWanda Page

In-universe information
- Gender: Female
- Occupation: Deaconess
- Family: Elroy Winfield (father); Essie Winfield (mother)
- Spouse: Woodrow "Woody" Anderson
- Children: Clifford Daniel "Cliff" Anderson (son) (adopted)
- Relatives: Elizabeth Winfield Sanford (sister; deceased); Flossie Winfield (sister); Ethel Winfield (sister); Minnie Winfield (sister); Ellen Winfield (sister); Hazel Winfield (sister); Rosetta Winfield (sister); Elsie Winfield (sister); Fred Sanford (brother-in-law); Edgar (brother-in-law); Jake (brother-in-law); Paul (brother-in-law); Lamont Sanford (nephew); Elizabeth (niece)

Esther Winfield Anderson, known as Aunt Esther, is a fictional character from the television series Sanford and Son. She was played by actress LaWanda Page, an acquaintance of series star Redd Foxx. Page was Foxx's first and only choice to play Esther.

== Enemy for Foxx's character ==
At first, Fred's main enemy on the show was in his sister-in-law and Lamont's aunt, Ethel (Beah Richards). Ethel's involvement in the Sanfords' family squabbles lasted only midway through the second season, whereupon she was replaced with her more tart-tongued sister, Esther.

Fred and Esther's relationship as in-laws went on to become a major part of the series' legend, as each time Esther appeared, Fred would insult her and audiences were drawn to the show in greater numbers. Conversely, Esther's disdain for Fred stemmed back to when he and Elizabeth were dating; she had disapproved of Fred marrying her sister. He would often contort his face upon Esther's entrance and make disparaging remarks to her, comparing her with King Kong and Godzilla. Esther would refer to Fred as an "old heathen", and often used the Bible on her brother-in-law (both figuratively, by quoting the Good Book, and literally, by smacking Fred with the purse where she kept it.) Despite his stubbornness, Fred would sometimes redeem himself with acts of kindness toward Esther.

== Character history ==
Esther Anderson is the Bible-toting sister-in-law of Fred Sanford. She is a staunchly religious Baptist who finds little use for humor and often criticizes Fred. Elizabeth, Esther's sister, was married to Fred, and Esther and the rest of the Winfield family were against the marriage from the outset. However, Esther often expressed that if anything good came out of the marriage it was her nephew, Fred's son, Lamont.

Lamont adored his aunt Esther, and would, against Fred's and Grady's wishes, allow her to stay in their house and often defended her against their insults. Since Esther and her family were the only real connection he had to his late mother, Lamont welcomed her often. She, in turn, was there to counsel Lamont on his life, and did her best to help him to get out of living in his father's junkyard house. She did so because she felt that Elizabeth would not have wanted Lamont, who Esther felt was very intelligent, to remain in such a limited life.

Fred responded to Esther's entrances by making exaggerated grimaces followed by colorful insults ("I thought I already flushed my toilet"). He would then proceed to ruthlessly insult her, likening her to animals and fictitious movie monsters. Fred often focused on Esther's looks, once telling her, "I could stick your face in some dough and make gorilla cookies!" He also often insulted her by calling her "ugly" and pronouncing it Ug-leee!.

Esther's usual reactions to Fred's antics were to scowl and say, "Watch it, sucka!" Sometimes, cracking from the constant barrage of insults, she would swing her purse wildly in Fred's direction while angrily calling him an "old fish-eyed fool" or "heathen", among other names. Once, during a public prayer, Esther made reference to Fred, calling him a "snaggle-toothed jackass." She also clashed with Fred's friend Grady Wilson, whom she disliked because he was Fred's friend.

Despite their constant arguments, some episodes reveal that Esther and Fred were capable of kindness towards each other, such as when Fred helped her adopt a child. In one episode, Fred gave Esther $100 he won gambling to help her church, leaving him 35 cents.

Esther's long-suffering but loving alcoholic husband Woodrow (played by Raymond Allen) appeared infrequently later in the series. Woodrow was constantly drunk and somewhat henpecked. He eventually became sober so he and Esther could adopt a young orphan, Daniel (Eric Laneuville) in "Aunt Esther Meets Her Son".

In the final two seasons of Sanford and Son, as well as its failed spin-off Sanford, Esther ran the Sanford Arms, boarding house owned and run by Fred, which was located next to his junk shop.

Esther also made a cameo appearance at the beginning of the movie Friday.

== Religious conflicts ==
Esther was a devout churchgoer, always armed with the Bible, and whenever she went to do battle with Fred, which was often, she was usually aided by some women from her church, or by her drunken husband, Woodrow; or would simply show up at Fred's house quoting the Bible. Usually, at any random moment, even in mid-sentence, Esther would throw her hands up and exclaim, "Oh, Glory!" (though it came out as H'ah Glory), even during her most heated arguments with Fred.

Her upright image was deflated when it was revealed that she had sex with a man called "Big Money Grip" in her youth. Grip had mistaken Esther for the beautiful Elizabeth in the dark, which led Grip to claim he was Lamont's real father.

Page's convincing portrayal of the "church lady" image of Aunt Esther was in marked contrast to the "blue" material of her stand-up act and record albums.
