= Whitman Mayo =

American actor (1930–2001)

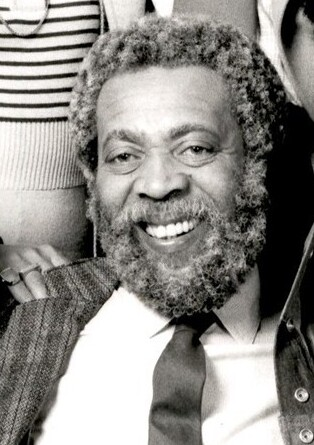
- Mayo in 1975
- Born: Whitman Blount Mayo Jr. November 15, 1930; New York City, U.S.
- Died: May 22, 2001 (aged 70); Atlanta, Georgia, U.S.
- Occupation: Actor
- Years active: 1966–2001
- Spouse(s): Melva Washington (m. 1956, divorced) Patricia Yorck (m. 1966; div. 1974) Gail Reid (m. 1974)

Whitman Blount Mayo Jr. (November 15, 1930 – May 22, 2001) was an American actor, best known for his role as Grady Wilson on the 1970s television sitcom Sanford and Son.

== Biography ==
=== Early years ===
Whitman Blount Mayo Jr. was born in New York City. He was raised in Harlem and later Queens. At the age of 17, he moved with his family to Southern California. He graduated from Fontana High School.

Mayo enlisted in the U.S. Army, serving from 1951 to 1953 during the Korean War.

Upon discharge, he studied at Chaffey College, Los Angeles City College, and UCLA.

=== Career ===
While attending college, Mayo began acting in small parts. He held many jobs to support himself and his family, including waiting tables, working in vineyards and as a probation officer. He also spent seven years as a counselor to delinquent boys.

In the early 1970s, while working for the New Lafayette Theatre, Norman Lear offered Mayo a role as Grady Wilson on Sanford and Son. The character's name was based on Demond Wilson, the actor who played Lamont Sanford and whose real first name is Grady. During a period where Redd Foxx did not appear on the show due to a contract dispute, Grady moved into the Sanford house and effectively starred in the show for six episodes. Mayo later starred in Grady, an unsuccessful spin-off in which his character moved in with his daughter and her husband in Beverly Hills. After its cancellation in 1976, Mayo's Grady character returned to Sanford and Son. Mayo reprised the role in the unsuccessful 1977 NBC-TV spinoff series Sanford Arms with actor Theodore Wilson, and for two episodes of Sanford, another spinoff of Sanford and Son, this time with Redd Foxx and actor Dennis Burkley, in 1981.

Also in the late 1970s, Mayo appeared on the Los Angeles children's television program That's Cat, offering sage advice in a sweet manner to the main character Alice. In 1990, he appeared in an episode of In the Heat of the Night titled "Hello in There". In 1991, he appeared in an episode of Full House titled "The Volunteer"; he played an old man named Eddie Johnson with Alzheimer's. In 1996, Late Night with Conan O'Brien spent several weeks trying to have Mayo appear on the show, after having initially failed to locate him. Conan even went as far to set up the "Grady Hotline", a 1–800 number where viewers could call in with any Grady "sightings". The show also aired a mock episode of Unsolved Mysteries. On February 8, 1996, Mayo appeared on Late Night to much fanfare. In 1997, he guest-starred in the Nickelodeon sitcom Kenan and Kel, playing Kenan and Kyra's rude, impatient Uncle Raymond.

Mayo also played a role in The Cape as Sweets, the owner of Moonshot Bar and Grill. Mayo made several film appearances, including The Main Event with Barbra Streisand, D.C. Cab, Boyz n the Hood, and Waterproof with Burt Reynolds. Mayo also appeared as Reverend Banyon on the BET TV Movie Boycott in 2001 and in an episode of Martin. He hosted Liars and Legends on Turner South. He also made appearances in Sesame Street. Mayo taught drama at Clark Atlanta University. He opened a travel agency in Inglewood, California. Mr. Mayo was a member of Kappa Alpha Psi fraternity.

=== Personal life and death ===
Mayo married Melva Washington, the daughter of Clarence and Lena Washington, in Los Angeles in 1956.

He resided in Atlanta's Collier Heights community since 1994 with Gail Mayo, his third wife.

Mayo died of a heart attack on May 22, 2001, at Atlanta's Grady Memorial Hospital. His son Rahn Mayo became a member of the Georgia House of Representatives in 2009.

== Filmography ==
- The Black Klansman (1966) – Alex
- Sanford and Son (1972–77) – Grady Wilson
- Grady (1975–76) – Grady Wilson
- That's Cat (1976) – Grandpa
- Baretta (1976) – Joey Rich
- Sesame Street (1976–1977)
- Sanford Arms (1977) – Grady Wilson
- Starsky and Hutch (1978) – Jeeter
- Vega$ (1978) – Lick Smith
- The Main Event (1979) – Percy
- Diff'rent Strokes (1979) - Jethro Simpson
- Lou Grant (1981) – Fred Jenkins
- Sanford (1981) – Grady Wilson
- Of Mice and Men (1981 made-for-TV movie) – Crooks
- Mr. Merlin (1982, episode "Arivaderci Dink") – Dink
- The Best of Times (1983) – Howling' Joe
- Trapper John, M.D. (1983–1985) – Lewis B. Larkin / D.L. Browne
- Hill Street Blues (1983)
- D.C. Cab (1983) – Mr. Rhythm
- Hell Town (1985) – One Ball
- In the Heat of the Night (1990) – Winston Tyler
- 227 (1986–1990) – Henry Hurley
- The Van Dyke Show (1988) - Doc Sterling
- Amen (1991) – Swifty
- Boyz n the Hood (1991) – The Old Man
- Full House (1991) – Eddie Johnson
- A Different World (1992) – Shop Owner (uncredited)
- The Seventh Coin (1993) – Coin Shop Owner
- Martin (1995) – Mr. Mackey
- Family Matters (1995) – Fletcher Thomas
- The Cape (1996) – Sweets (owner of the Moonshot Bar & Grill) / Sweets
- Kenan & Kel (1997) – Uncle Raymond
- ER (1999) – Jesse Morgan
- Waterproof (2000) – Sugar
- Boycott (2001) – Reverend Banyon (final film role)
- Beah: A Black Woman Speaks (2003, documentary) – Himself
