= Fred G. Sanford =

Fictional character portrayed by Redd Foxx

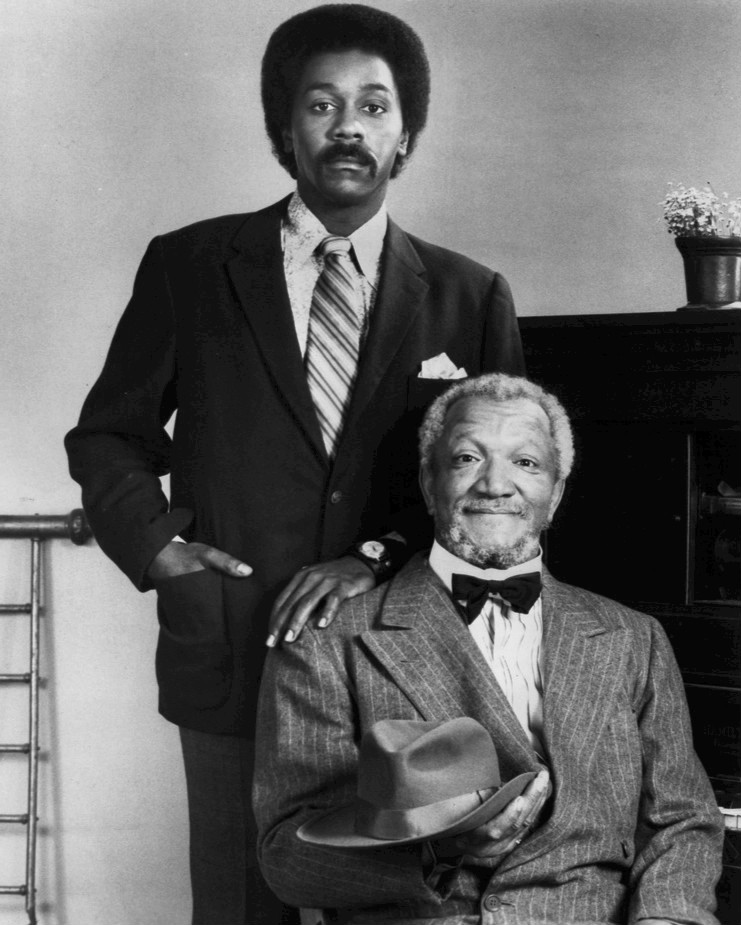
- Fred G. Sanford (seated) and his son Lamont
- First appearance: "Crossed Swords" (Sanford and Son)
- Last appearance: "To Keep a Thief" (Sanford)
- Created by: Norman Lear and Bud Yorkin, based on Albert Steptoe created by Galton and Simpson
- Portrayed by: Redd Foxx

In-universe information
- Gender: Male
- Occupation: Junk/antiques dealer
- Spouse: Elizabeth Winfield Sanford (deceased 1952)
- Children: Lamont Sanford (son) (born September 27, 1940)
- Relatives: Frances Sanford Victor (sister); Esther Winfield Anderson (sister-in-law); Ethel Winfield (sister-in-law); Essie Winfield (mother in-law); Elroy Winfield (father in-law); Leotus Sanford (uncle; deceased)

Fred G. Sanford is a fictional character portrayed by actor/comedian Redd Foxx on the 1972–1977 NBC sitcom Sanford and Son and the 1980–1981 NBC sitcom Sanford.

Foxx, whose real name was John Elroy Sanford, modeled the character after his real-life older brother, Fred Glenn Sanford, Jr., who had died in 1965, seven years before the show premiered. The role is adapted from Albert Steptoe (Wilfrid Brambell) of the series's forebear, Steptoe and Son. The character Fred is an elderly, widowed, sarcastic, and cantankerous junk and antique dealer. He is the proprietor of "Sanford and Son", a junk and antique dealership which he runs out of his home, along with his son, Lamont. Foxx appeared in all episodes of the series except nine in 1974 (due to a contract dispute Foxx had with NBC).

In 1999, TV Guide ranked him #36 on its list of the 50 Greatest TV Characters of All Time.

== Background ==
Fred G. Sanford was born in St. Louis, Missouri on January 20, 1907 (the episode "Happy Birthday, Pop" celebrated his 65th birthday that aired in 1972). In 1946, he, his wife Elizabeth Winfield and their son Lamont (Demond Wilson) moved to the Watts neighborhood of Los Angeles. Fred was left with the responsibility of rearing Lamont alone after his wife suddenly died several years later. Lamont dropped out of high school, subsequently joining his father in the junk business. Lamont, as he was known, was actually his middle name; Fred and Elizabeth could never decide on a first name. In one episode, Lamont was known as "Lamont Grady Sanford".

Fred is portrayed as being irritable and wanting everything done his way. He is known for his grouchy disposition, his bad cooking, and his innumerable delusions of grandeur. He is bow-legged and walks with an affected stagger, presumably brought on by his (self-diagnosed) arthritis.

Fred never gives much credit to his son Lamont, believing him to be gullible and unintelligent and often refers to Lamont as a "big dummy". Unhappy about his calling as a junk man, Lamont accepts his plight more for the love of his father than the junk business itself. Fred often involves himself in various get-rich-quick schemes, and as such, Lamont has to keep constant watch over his father. When Lamont would express an interest in having a life for himself, Fred tries to convince him of the importance of running the family business (which he refers to as "the empire") after he is gone. Fred often feigned illness in attempt to guilt his son into staying home and taking care of him whenever Lamont had plans to go out. Similarly, Fred often ruined Lamont's efforts to have a quiet romantic night at home with a lady companion. At one point, Fred repeatedly interrupts Lamont's amorous efforts so often that the young lady ended up sneaking away while Fred and Lamont argue loudly in the kitchen.

Despite his antics, Fred loves and shows concern for Lamont. He also occasionally displays the street smarts he learned growing up in St. Louis. For example, in an episode where Lamont unwittingly invites three card sharps to the house to play poker, Lamont ignores Fred's warnings and loses all his money. Fred, pretending to be foolish, convinces the sharps to let him play a few rounds and proceeds to win all of the money by means of a rigged deck of cards.

== Personality ==
=== Reactions ===
When asked over the phone for his name, he frequently responds, "Fred Sanford. That's S-A-N-F-O-R-D period" or "Fred G. Sanford. The 'G' is for...", with "G" standing for a word applicable to the situation. Some instances have included "gonna cry", "genius", "gee", "grandpa", "gompergoo", "gefilte fish", and as Lamont himself once said in the episode, "The Reverend Sanford", "Glory glory, Hallelujah". It is never revealed what the "G" actually stands for in his name, though it is possible that it could mean "Glenn", the middle name of Foxx's real-life brother, or possible that it could mean "Grady", due to the middle name of Lamont Grady Sanford, known in an early episode where Lamont almost got married. Another trademark involves Fred becoming riled by somebody, assuming a fight stance, and wildly swinging his fists in multiple directions; often he would pose the question, "How would you like one across yo' lips?" or, with fist raised, "How would you like one of these where you sneeze?".

He also frequently attempts to avoid any kind of labor, especially when asked by Lamont, by referring to his arthritis (which he pronounced "arthur-itis") while holding up a deliberately gnarled fist. When Lamont asks him what he does all day while he is out on the truck, Fred often says, "Coordinate."

Fred spends much of his free time watching television (having an affinity for daikaiju films such as the Godzilla series) and drinking a favorite discount wine called Ripple. Ripple is a frequent joke as well, as often Fred comes up with odd combinations of Ripple and other alcoholic beverages, like with champagne ("Champipple"), or cranberry juice ("Cripple"), or a French wine called Beaujolais ("Beaujolipple"). He even once developed a taste for Sangria wine, calling it "Flapple" because he felt it tasted like flat Ripple.

Another recurring joke is his poor vision; whenever he gets ready to make a phone call, he opens a drawer under the phone and pulls out several pairs of glasses (to help him see the phone dial) and tries each one on until he finds one that seems to help, though the pair he picks usually does not improve his vision, anyway. He, along with Lamont, also often kept valuables or stashes of cash in a secret drawer in that same chest of drawers, which would open after a series of knocks on the dresser and/or foot stamps on the floor. (While Lamont usually pounded on the top of the chest three times, then once on the side, Fred often did various weird combinations to open it.)

In what would become the character's best known trademark, when something would alarm him, or when things did not go the way he wanted them, Fred would inevitably have a simulated heart attack, accentuated by clutching his chest and crying out to his late wife, "Oh, this is the big one! You hear that, Elizabeth?! I'm coming to join you, honey!" However, in real life, Foxx actually died of a heart attack while rehearsing for the role of Alfonso Royal in the CBS sitcom, Royal Family. When Lena Horne guested on the program, and Lamont saw her, he reacted the same way: "I think I'm havin' one, pop! My first one and it's a big one… you hear that, mom? Your little boy's comin' to join ya… with a mustache!"

Fred often clashed with Elizabeth's older sister, Lamont's aunt Esther Anderson (LaWanda Page). Aunt Esther and her family had opposed Fred marrying Elizabeth from the very beginning, and Fred and Esther continue their mutual animosity unabated, despite the best efforts of Lamont. Fred makes a habit of teasing Esther because he thinks she is unattractive (Fred once told Esther, "I could stick your face in some dough and make gorilla cookies!"). For her own part, Esther took no sass from Fred, often referring to him as a "heathen", "sucka", and "fish-eyed fool", and she often tried to use her Bible to change Fred's ways (both figuratively and literally; Esther both quoted from the Bible and also often tried to whack Fred with the heavy purse that she carried it in). Much of the show's comedy came from the interplay between opinionated Fred and his strong-willed sister-in-law.

=== Prejudices ===
Throughout the series' run, Fred was often portrayed as being prejudiced himself. He often insults his Puerto Rican neighbor Julio in various ways, including deprecating his culture and making fun of his accent. After Julio greeted him with "Buenos dias, Mr. Sanford," Fred mocked the expression by responding, "And beans and disease to you, too." He also insults Lamont's Japanese friend, Ah Chew, calling him "Choo Choo" and threatening to "really close your eyes" when Ah Chew attempted to hug him. He states at one point that "ain't nothin' on earth uglier than a 90-year-old white woman." His ignorance towards other cultures causes him a severe embarrassment when a Japanese family, interested in buying Fred's land, invites him and Lamont to dinner. The grown daughter sees him eating what he mistakenly thinks are grapes, and smiles "Oh, Mr. Sanford! I am so happy! You like the fish eyes!" Perhaps the biggest affront to Fred's sensibilities came when he discovered his beloved younger sister—whom he had raised himself after their parents died—had married a white man (who was also extremely fond of hugging, further earning him Fred's ire). Sometimes even being African-American did not help with Fred, as he was very untrusting of Lamont's friend Rollo (Nathaniel Taylor) often referring to him as a convict because of his style, as well as often deriding whether or not fellow African-Americans have high end jobs (like managers) and not "typical" black-person jobs (janitors, car wash employees, etc.), and even not placing people like a judge on the same level. (Fred: "That's the problem. A black man doesn't have a chance here!" Judge: "I'm black!" Fred: "Well, you the judge. That don't count.") Despite this, one of Fred's closest friends during the series was a Jewish man named Goldstein; at one point, Fred dons a yarmulke in order to go over to Goldstein's house and eat chicken soup. During a later episode, Fred attempts to trace his family tree and is mistakenly led to believe he has Jewish ancestry.

=== Relationships with women ===
Fred was depicted as having an eye for the ladies. In addition to his longtime girlfriend Donna, Fred attempted to hook up with topless waitress "Fast" Fanny, a traveling saleswoman named Carol, and even celebrities such as Lena Horne and Della Reese. Fred wasted no opportunities to flirt with attractive women regardless of location or situation, such as nurses (at the clinic where he got screened for tuberculosis, Fred remarked that a nurse had "TB… Terrific Body!"; similarly, when an attractive nurse came into his hospital room offering a back rub to calm him down, Fred immediately began primping once she left the room), stewardesses (a running gag in the episode where Fred takes his first plane trip involved his constant leering at the attractive stewardess whenever she walked away), and receptionists (when the receptionist at the dental clinic said "I just need to have you answer a few questions," Fred came back with "And may I ask you one or two questions as well.") Lamont once remarked to Fred, "You're just a dirty old man!"; Fred immediately replied, "And I'm gonna be one until I'm a dead old man." Sometimes, it could come back to bite him, as a woman he once wooed over a few too many drinks came looking for him during the episode, "Will the Real Fred Sanford Please Do Something" (one of the episodes filmed in Foxx's absence), to take him up on a wedding proposal, and is stuck thinking every person in the room is Fred at one point, starting with Grady and ending with the Caucasian Hoppy (who was rather amused by this), before finally being taken away by Hoppy and Smitty. (Though Lamont, once it was all over, said he was going to have a talk with Fred about this when he gets back, it was completely forgotten.)

=== Friendships ===
Fred has had many friends in the neighborhood, starting with Melvin (Slappy White), and a lot of others, like Leroy, Skillet, etc. from the pool hall. However, his two best friends are Grady Wilson (Whitman Mayo) and Bubba Bexley (Don Bexley). Even though Fred thinks the two are dim witted, he knows that they are more than reliable and can always lend him a helping hand.

Two Los Angeles police officers, the African-American "Smitty" Smith (Hal Williams) and the caucasian Howard "Hoppy" Hopkins (Howard Platt) are Fred's friends and confidantes in matters concerning the law. Smitty is native to Watts and wise to the ways of the street, while Hoppy is somewhat unaccustomed to the street and attempts to solve crimes "by the book". Whenever Hoppy explains a situation in police jargon, Fred and Lamont look to Smitty, who gives the interpretation in "street jive". On a few occasions, Hoppy is replaced by Officer "Swanny" Swanhouser (Noam Pitlik), who is even more "by the book" than Hoppy.

== Notes ==
1. Libra Rising All Over Lamont Episode Number: 40
2. My Brother-in-Law's Keeper Episode Number: 82
3. Fred Sings the Blues Episode Number: 135
4. Fred, the Reluctant Fingerman Episode Number: 41
