= Sanford and Son =

American sitcom (1972–1977)

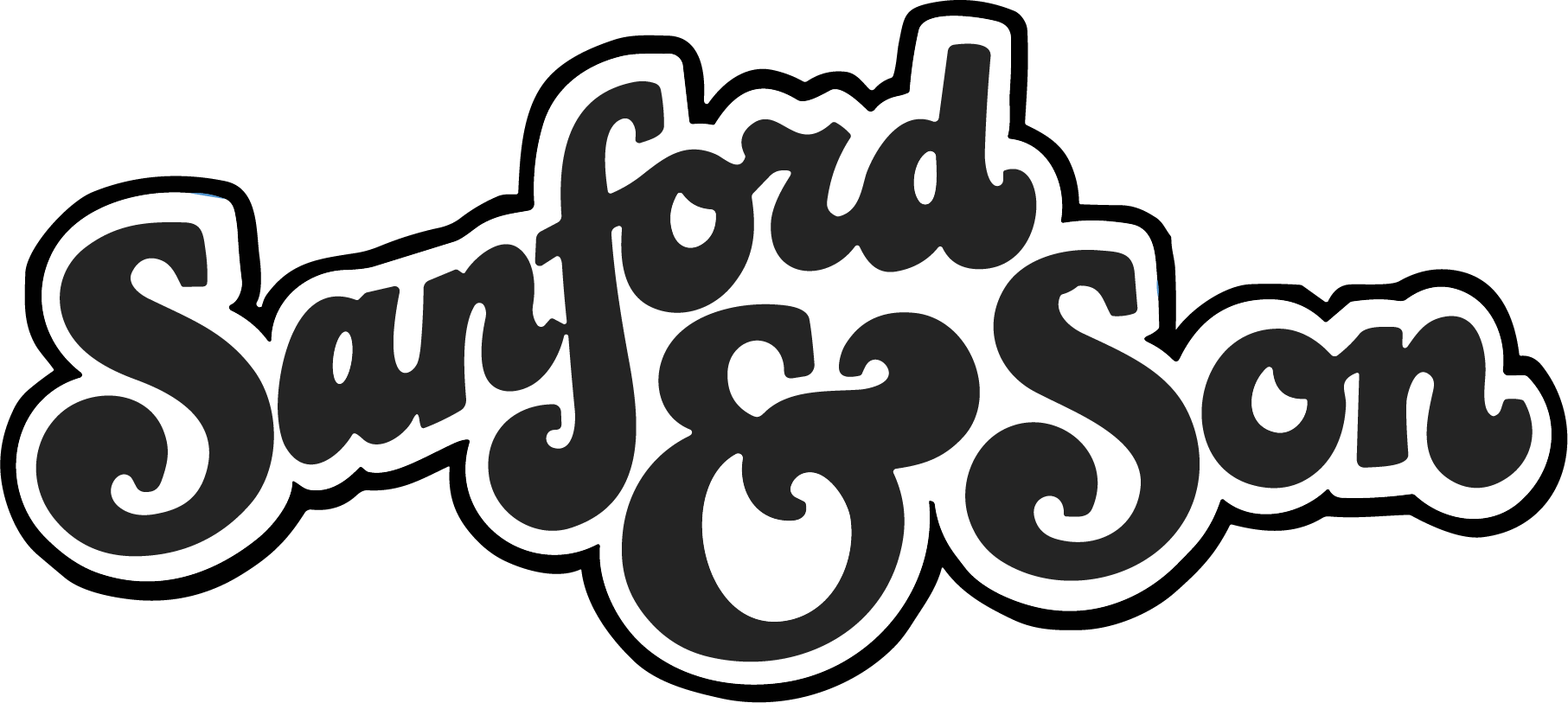
- Genre: Sitcom
- Based on: Steptoe and Son by Ray Galton; Alan Simpson
- Developed by: Bud Yorkin; Norman Lear (uncredited)
- Starring: Redd Foxx; Demond Wilson
- Theme music composer: Quincy Jones
- Opening theme: "The Streetbeater"
- Composer: Quincy Jones
- Country of origin: United States
- Original language: English
- No. of seasons: 6
- No. of episodes: 136 (list of episodes)

Production
- Executive producers: Bud Yorkin; Norman Lear (uncredited)
- Producers: Aaron Ruben (1972–1974); Bernie Orenstein and Saul Turteltaub (1974–1977)
- Camera setup: Multi-camera
- Running time: 22–24 minutes
- Production company: Tandem Productions

Original release
- Network: NBC
- Release: January 14, 1972 – March 25, 1977

Related
- Sanford Arms Sanford; Steptoe and Son Grady

Sanford and Son is an American sitcom television series that was produced by Tandem Productions and aired on NBC from January 14, 1972, to March 25, 1977. It was based on the British sitcom Steptoe and Son, which initially aired on BBC1, in the United Kingdom, from 1962 to 1974.

Known for its racial humor, running gags, and catchphrases, the series was adapted by Norman Lear and considered NBC's response to CBS's All in the Family. Sanford and Son has been hailed as the precursor to many other Black American sitcoms. It was a hit through its six-season run, finishing in the Nielsen top ten five times.

The series follows Fred G. Sanford, known for his bigotry and cranky personality, and Lamont Sanford, his long-suffering, conscientious, peacemaker son. Both characters are occasionally involved in get-rich-quick schemes to pay off their various debts.

The show also includes characters Aunt Esther, Grady Wilson, Bubba Bexley, Rollo Lawson, Donna Harris, and Julio Fuentes.

== Plot ==
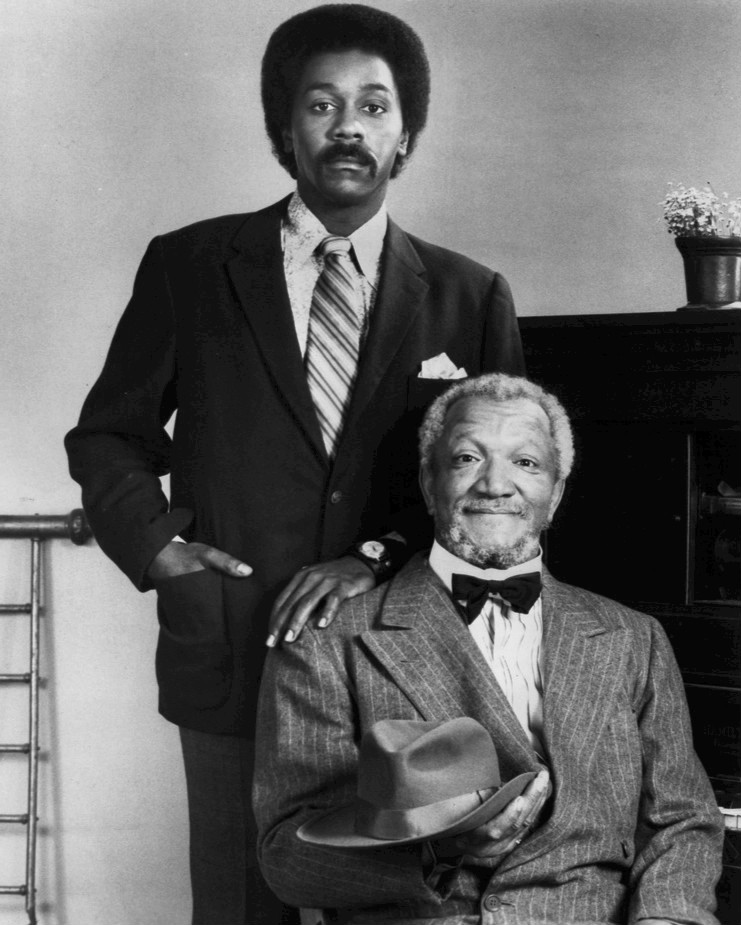
Fred (seated) and Lamont Sanford

Sanford and Son stars Redd Foxx as Fred G. Sanford, a widower and junk dealer living at 9114 South Central Avenue in the Watts neighborhood of Los Angeles, California, and Demond Wilson as his son Lamont Sanford. In the show, Fred moved to South Central Los Angeles from his hometown St. Louis during his youth.

After the show premiered in 1972, newspapers touted Foxx as NBC's answer to Archie Bunker, the bigoted white protagonist of All in the Family. Both shows were adapted by Norman Lear from BBC programmes. Sanford and Son was adapted from Steptoe and Son and All in the Family from Till Death Us Do Part.

An earlier pilot for an American version of Steptoe and Son was produced by Joseph E. Levine in 1965. It starred Lee Tracy and Aldo Ray as Albert and Harold Steptoe. This version was unscreened and did not lead to a series. The pilot was released on DVD in the UK in 2018.

== Characters ==
=== Main ===
- Redd Foxx as Fred G. Sanford
- Demond Wilson as Lamont Sanford

=== Recurring ===
- LaWanda Page as Esther Anderson
- Whitman Mayo as Grady Wilson
- Don Bexley as Don "Bubba" Bexley
- Raymond Allen as Woodrow "Woody" Anderson
- Nathaniel Taylor as Rollo Lawson
- Lynn Hamilton as Donna Harris
- Gregory Sierra as Julio Fuentes
- Pat Morita as Ah Chew
- Howard Platt as Officer Howard "Hoppy" Hopkins
- Hal Williams as Officer "Smitty" Smith
- Noam Pitlik as Officer "Swanny" Swanhauser
- Nancy Kulp as May Hopkins
- Marlene Clark as Janet Lawson
- Slappy White as Melvin
- Leroy Daniels and Ernest 'Skillet' Mayhand as Leroy & Skillet
- Matthew "Stymie" Beard as Otis Littlejohn
- Arnold Johnson as George "Hutch" Hutton
- Davis Roberts as Dr. Caldwell
- James Wheaton as Nelson B. Davis
- Alvin Childress as Reverend Trimble
- Mary Alice as Frances Victor
- Allan Drake as Rodney Victor

== Episodes ==
Season	Episodes	Originally released		Rank	Rating
Season	Episodes	First released	Last released	Rank	Rating
1	14	January 14, 1972	April 14, 1972	6	25.2
2	24	September 15, 1972	March 16, 1973	2	27.6
3	24	September 14, 1973	March 29, 1974	3	27.5
4	25	September 13, 1974	April 25, 1975	2	29.6
5	24	September 12, 1975	March 19, 1976	7	24.4 (Note: Tied with Rhoda)
6	25	September 24, 1976	March 25, 1977	27	20.3

== Reception and cancellation ==
Sanford and Son was enormously popular during most of its run and was one of the top ten highest-rated series on American television from its first season (1972) through the 1975–76 season.

Sanford and Son took enough of the audience from ABC's The Brady Bunch to drive it off the air in 1974. Sanford and Son peaked at No. 2 in the Nielsen ratings during the 1972–73 season and the 1974–75 season, and the series was second only to All in the Family in ratings during those years. By the 1974–75 season, Sanford and Son's lead-in helped the entire NBC Friday night lineup place in the coveted bracket of the Top 15 shows (Chico and the Man, following Sanford and Son at 8:30 p.m., ranked No. 3 for the season, while the police dramas The Rockford Files and Police Woman, which aired later in the evening, ranked at No. 12 and No. 15, respectively).

The show's ratings dipped substantially in its final season, though it was still quite popular at the time of its cancellation.

In 2007, Time magazine included the show on its list of the "100 Best TV Shows of All Time".

=== Ratings ===
Sanford and Son was a ratings hit through its six-season run on NBC. Despite airing in the so-called Friday night death slot, it managed to peak at No. 2 in the ratings (behind All in the Family, and ranked less than one ratings point behind All in the Family during the 1974–75 season).

Season	Time slot (ET)	Rank	Rating	Households
1971–72	Friday at 8:00–8:30 PM	No. 6	25.2	15,649,200
1972–73	Friday at 8:00–8:30 PM	No. 2	27.6	17,884,800
1973–74	Friday at 8:00–8:30 PM	No. 3	27.5	18,205,000
1974–75	Friday at 8:00–8:30 PM	No. 2	29.6	20,276,000
1975–76	Friday at 8:00–8:30 PM	No. 7	24.4 (Tied with Rhoda)	16,982,400
1976–77	Friday at 8:00–8:30 PM (Episodes 1, 3–11, 13–25); Friday at 8:30–9:00 PM (Episode 2); Tuesday at 8:00–8:30 PM (Episode 12)	No. 27	20.3	14,453,600

== Production notes ==
The series was produced by Norman Lear's and Bud Yorkin's Tandem Productions, which was also responsible for All in the Family. The two shows were both based on popular British sitcoms and both were pioneers of edgy, racial humor that reflected the changing politics of the time. Both series also featured outspoken, working-class protagonists with overt prejudices. However, Sanford and Son differed from All in the Family and other Norman Lear shows of the era in that it lacked the element of drama. Sanford and Son helped to redefine the genre of black situation comedy.

Because of Lear's commitments to his other concurrent series, and the distance between NBC Studios in Burbank where Sanford and Son were taped and the Hollywood locations of other Tandem shows, such as All in the Family, Maude, The Jeffersons, and One Day at a Time, which were recorded at CBS Television City or Metromedia Square, he did not have as much day-to-day involvement with Sanford and Son as with the other Tandem series, leaving the show-running to Yorkin.

While taping episodes for the 1973–74 season, Redd Foxx walked off the show in a salary dispute, though he cited health issues. His character was written out of the series for the remaining six episodes of the season, and it was explained that Fred Sanford was away in St. Louis attending his cousin's funeral, with friend Grady (Whitman Mayo) in charge of the home. Foxx, who had been earning $19,000 per episode, equivalent to $137,800 in 2025, sought a 25% ownership stake in the series. Tandem Productions fought back with a $10 million lawsuit. The dispute was resolved in June 1974, with Foxx receiving $25,000, equivalent to $181,316 in 2025, per episode, to equal Carroll O'Connor's All in the Family pay, plus 25% of the producers' net profits.

Although Foxx was still absent for production of the first three shows of season 4, NBC aired his return as the season premiere and delayed showing the previously taped episodes. In 1977, rival network ABC lured Foxx away with a large sum to host his variety show, The Redd Foxx Comedy Hour, ending Sanford and Son, which had been gradually declining in the ratings. The media reported that the dispute between Foxx and NBC was over the lack of a dressing-room window. Coincidentally, the dispute about the dressing room window was written into part of the Season 5 episode "Steinberg and Son", where Fred demands "a dressing room with lots of windows." An exterior shot of the NBC Burbank lot can also be seen in the episode.

The storefront, seen only in the opening credits, stood at 10659 West Magnolia Boulevard in North Hollywood, nearly 16 miles from the Sanfords' fictitious 9114 South Central Avenue address in Watts. This same storefront, minus the "Sanford and Son" sign, can also be seen in Emergency! in a 1973 episode titled "Alley Cat".

The pickup truck depicted in the series is a 1951 Ford F1. It was purchased at auction after the series ended and was later leased back to NBC for the spin-off shows Sanford Arms and Sanford. It has changed hands a few times over the years, eventually purchased by a real-life junk dealer, Donald Dimmitt of Dimmitt's Auto Salvage, in Argos, Indiana. The truck was later purchased by a classic car dealership in North Royalton, Ohio, where it remained in 2026.

=== Theme music ===
Titled "The Streetbeater", the theme music was composed by Quincy Jones through A&M Records and released on record in 1973. Although the song did not reach Billboard status, it has maintained mainstream popularity and is featured on Jones' greatest-hits album. The song has been featured on series such as Scrubs, Family Guy and The Simpsons.

== Daytime reruns ==
The series was rebroadcast on NBC from June 14, 1976, to July 21, 1978. The show initially debuted at 10:00am, to replace High Rollers, and marked the first daytime sitcom rerun on NBC since the removal of Make Room for Daddy reruns from the schedule in 1965, where it ran alongside the debuts of The Fun Factory and The Gong Show, but after the debut of the game show Card Sharks, which ran on the 10:00am timeslot, it moved to noon, where it ran until it was cancelled to make room for America Alive!.

== Legacy ==
After the series was canceled in 1977, a short-lived continuation featuring the supporting characters titled Sanford Arms aired. Whitman Mayo starred in a short-lived spin-off series, Grady, during the 1975–1976 season.

In 1980–1981, Foxx attempted to revive the show with another short-lived series titled Sanford, but Demond Wilson refused to reprise his role as Lamont Sanford for the new series.

== Home media ==
Sony Pictures Home Entertainment released all six seasons of Sanford and Son on Region 1 DVD between August 2002 and June 2005, with a 'Complete Series' box set following in 2008.

DVD name	Ep #	Release date
First Season	14	August 6, 2002
Second Season	24	February 4, 2003
Third Season	24	October 7, 2003
Fourth Season	25	March 30, 2004
Fifth Season	24	September 14, 2004
Sixth and Final Season	25	June 7, 2005
Complete Series	136	October 28, 2008
