= Sanford (TV series) =

- Genre: Sitcom
- Based on: Steptoe and Son created by Ray Galton; Alan Simpson
- Starring: Redd Foxx; Dennis Burkley; Marguerite Ray; Nathaniel Taylor; Cathy Cooper; Percy Rodriguez
- Theme music composer: Quincy Jones
- Country of origin: United States
- Original language: English
- No. of seasons: 2
- No. of episodes: 26

Production
- Executive producer: Morton Lachman
- Running time: 22–25 minutes
- Production companies: Tandem Productions; Redd Foxx Productions

Original release
- Network: NBC
- Release: March 15, 1980 – July 10, 1981

Related
- Sanford and Son; Sanford Arms

Sanford is an American sitcom television series and a sequel to the original 1972–1977 sitcom Sanford and Son. It was broadcast on NBC from March 15, 1980, to July 10, 1981. The series also marked Redd Foxx's first return to the network in a starring role since Sanford and Son ended in 1977.

== Background ==
In 1977, after six seasons of Sanford and Son, Redd Foxx left the NBC show to star in a variety show for ABC. His new show, The Redd Foxx Comedy Hour, was cancelled after just four months.

By 1980, however, Foxx would again be reprising his role of Fred G. Sanford.

== Plot ==
After Fred Sanford's son Lamont moves to Alaska, Fred now finds himself running his Watts junkyard with a new partner, jovial Texan Cal Pettie. The show also follows Fred's romantic pursuit of a wealthy widow, Eve, and his schemes to make money, often navigating disapproval from Eve's upper-class family.

== Cast ==
- Redd Foxx as Fred Sanford
- Dennis Burkley as Cal Pettie
- Nathaniel Taylor as Rollo Lawson (season 1)
- Marguerite Ray as Evelyn "Eve" Lewis (season 1; recurring, season 2)
- Cathy Cooper as Clara (season 1)
- Suzanne Stone as Cissy Lewis (season 1)
- Percy Rodrigues as Winston (season 1)
- LaWanda Page as Esther Anderson (season 2)
- Clinton Derricks-Carroll as Clifford Anderson (season 2; recurring, season 1)

== Episodes ==
=== Season 1 (1980) ===
| No. overall | No. in season | Title | Directed by | Written by | Original release date |
|---|---|---|---|---|---|
| 1 | 1 | "The Meeting" | Jim Drake | Ted Bergman and Sy Rosen | March 15, 1980 |
| 2 | 2 | "The Meeting" | Jim Drake | Ted Bergman and Sy Rosen | March 15, 1980 |
Fred continues coordinating his junk empire with a new partner, Cal Pettie, Lamont's friend and co-worker from the Alaskan Pipeline. And into Fred's Garden of Eden steps in Eve Lewis. Fred proposes to Eve, but feels very out of place in her sophisticated social circle, especially when wearing a borrowed magician's tuxedo.
| 3 | 3 | "The Meeting: Part 3" | Jim Drake | Douglas Arango & Phil Doran and Sy Rosen | March 22, 1980 |
After faking a heart attack to get out of his engagement, Fred realizes that he still has feelings for Eve.
| 4 | 4 | "The Still of the Night" | Jim Drake | Ted Bergman | March 29, 1980 |
Fred schemes to make easy money from Cal's smooth bourbon after discovering Cal has built a still and is making lip-smacking good moonshine using his family's secret recipe.
| 5 | 5 | "Dinner at George's" | Sammy Davis Jr. and Jim Drake | Larry Rhine and Mel Tolkin | April 5, 1980 |
Big spender Fred insists on taking Eve to her favorite Beverly Hills bistro, but gets his ego bruised when Eve plots to pay the check behind his back.
| 6 | 6 | "Younger Than Springtime Am I" | Jim Drake | Story by : Michael Morris; Teleplay by : Michael G. Moye | April 8, 1980 |
Feeling old, Fred falls for a con man's quack cure and buys a fountain of youth pill called Methusatol.
| 7 | 7 | "Retrospective" | Jim Drake | Douglas Arango and Phil Doran | April 15, 1980 |
| 8 | 8 | "Retrospective" | Jim Drake | Douglas Arango and Phil Doran | April 15, 1980 |
While hauling junk from Eve's home, Fred and Cal are arrested on suspicion of burglary. While sitting in jail, they reminisce about their first meeting and of Fred and Eve's engagement party.
| 9 | 9 | "Perfect Husband" | Jim Drake | Harriett Weiss & Patt Shea | April 26, 1980 |
Fred and Eve's engagement hits a bump in the road when Eve romanticizes her late husband as an angel and a saint, and flesh-and-blood Fred fears he can't compete.
| 10 | 10 | "The Ring" | Jim Drake | Judi Ann Mason | May 10, 1980 |
After being terrorized in a jewelry store robbery, Fred discovers a $12,000 diamond ring fell into his cap. While deciding whether to return or to keep the ring, Officers Hoppy and Smitty appear at the door.
| 11 | 11 | "Cissy and the Nephew" | Jim Drake | Story by : Winston Moss; Teleplay by : Marc Sheffler | May 17, 1980 |
Aunt Esther's son Cliff comes to stay with Fred and falls fast for Eve's daughter Cissy.
| 12 | 12 | "Cal's Diet" | Jim Drake | Ted Bergman | May 24, 1980 |
| 13 | 13 | "Cal's Diet" | Jim Drake | Ted Bergman | May 24, 1980 |
Cal is lonely and depressed about his weight, so Fred and Cliff put Cal on a diet and exercise regimen designed to build up his body and boost his sagging self-confidence.
| 14 | 14 | "The Benefit" | Jim Drake | John Donley and Stan Taylor | May 31, 1980 |
Sammy Davis Jr. agrees to perform at Eve's charity benefit for the Children of Watts, but when Sammy doesn't show, Cliff, Cissy, Cal and Fred take to the stage and showcase their talents.

=== Season 2 (1981) ===
| No. overall | No. in season | Title | Directed by | Written by | Original release date |
|---|---|---|---|---|---|
| 15 | 1 | "Here's Comes the Bride" | Jim Drake | Phil Doran and Sy Rosen | January 9, 1981 |
| 16 | 2 | "Here's Comes the Bride" | Jim Drake | Phil Doran and Sy Rosen | January 9, 1981 |
Aunt Esther returns and moves in with Fred to watch over Cliff. Cal discovers that due to an error on Fred's marriage license, Fred was actually long ago legally wed to Esther. Fred, Esther and Cal drive to Fremont, Missouri seeking a divorce, but must first plead their case before the county's irascible old judge, who is resistant to tearing asunder what God joined together.
| 17 | 3 | "Fred Has the Big One" | Jim Drake | Douglas Arango and Phil Doran | January 16, 1981 |
After years of crying wolf, Fred suffers an actual heart attack.
| 18 | 4 | "Cal the Coward" | Jim Drake | J. Stanford Parker | January 23, 1981 |
When a pair of crooks threaten Fred and Cal at gunpoint, Cal can only cower in the closet. Fred cooks up a caper to give Cal the chance to prove his courage and regain his self-respect.
| 19 | 5 | "Love Is Blind" | Jim Drake | Story by : Warren S. Murray; Teleplay by : Chip Keyes & Doug Keyes | January 30, 1981 |
Fred invites Cliff and his new girlfriend Charlene to dinner, but Cliff neglects to tell Fred that Charlene is blind.
| 20 | 6 | "Cal's Mom" | Jim Drake | Story by : Ken Hecht; Teleplay by : Bob Schiller & Bob Weiskopf | May 29, 1981 |
Cal's mother comes to visit and among her baggage is bigotry against blacks. A special episode addressing racial prejudice.
| 21 | 7 | "Gaslight" | Jim Drake | Chip Keyes & Doug Keyes | June 5, 1981 |
Suffering from a virus and delirious, Fred misunderstands an overheard conversation and now fears Cal is plotting to kill him.
| 22 | 8 | "Freeway" | Jim Drake | Ted Bergman | June 12, 1981 |
The city is debating whether to run a freeway through Watts or the wealthy Corban Hills neighborhood. Fred, Cal and Cliff organize their neighbors and lead the charge to save their homes.
| 23 | 9 | "Jury Duty" | Jim Drake | Ted Bergman | June 19, 1981 |
In this spoof of "12 Angry Men," Fred is the lone juror unwilling to cast a guilty verdict in a murder trial.
| 24 | 10 | "Cal's Illegal Alien" | Jim Drake | Story by : Michael Morris; Teleplay by : Neil Leibowitz | June 26, 1981 |
Cal just met a girl named Maria, but she's an illegal alien hiding in the Sanford home during a rash of immigration raids in the area.
| 25 | 11 | "Private Lives" | Jim Drake | Story by : Jim Gagan; Teleplay by : Douglas Arango & Phil Doran | July 3, 1981 |
Fred and Eve have a lover's quarrel, with each vowing to bring a better date to the art gallery opening. Grady fixes up Fred with a bubble-headed bimbo named Bunny.
| 26 | 12 | "To Keep a Thief" | Jim Drake | Bill Box & Dick Westerschulte | July 10, 1981 |
The 14-year-old boy who burglarized the Sanford home is ordered to work off the amount he stole. Fred and Cal hope to scare him straight.

== Syndication ==
Sanford has not been included in the syndication package with Sanford and Son. However, reruns aired on BET throughout the 1990s. The show returned to BET in March 2008. To celebrate the return, an all day marathon of all 26 episodes occurred on March 8, 2008, to celebrate Daylight Saving Time as 'San-forward'. In 2022, the complete series became available to stream for free on Tubi until January 2026.

== Bibliography ==
- Tim Brooks and Earle Marsh, The Complete Directory to Prime Time Network and Cable TV Shows 1946–Present, Ninth edition (New York: Ballantine Books, 2007) ISBN 978-0-345-49773-4
- The Ironic Death of Redd Fox Part Two
