= Bernie Orenstein =

Canadian-American actor, producer and screenwriter (1931–2026)

- Born: Bernard Orenstein; February 5, 1931; Toronto, Ontario, Canada
- Died: September 14, 2026 (aged 95)
- Occupations: Actor, producer, screenwriter
- Spouse: Barbara Rhoades (m. 1979; died 2026)

Bernard Orenstein (February 5, 1931 – September 14, 2026) was a Canadian-American actor, television producer and screenwriter. He was the collaborator of Saul Turteltaub, and he produced and wrote for television programs including That Girl, Cosby, The New Dick Van Dyke Show, Kate & Allie, The Monkees, Sanford and Son (and its spin-offs Grady and Sanford Arms), What's Happening!!, and Love, American Style.

Orenstein was born in Toronto, Ontario on February 5, 1931. Aside from producing and writing, Orenstein served as a professor at Long Island University.

Orenstein died on September 14, 2026, at the age of 95.
