= Bud Yorkin =

American producer, director, and screenwriter (1926–2015)

- Born: Alan David Yorkin; February 22, 1926; Washington, Pennsylvania, U.S.
- Died: August 18, 2015 (aged 89); Bel Air, California, U.S.
- Occupations: Director; producer; screenwriter; actor
- Years active: 1952–2015
- Spouses: Peg Yorkin (m. 1954; div. 1986); Cynthia Sikes Yorkin (m. 1989–2015)
- Children: 4, including Nicole

Alan David "Bud" Yorkin (February 22, 1926 – August 18, 2015) was an American film and television producer, director, screenwriter, and actor.

== Biography ==
Yorkin was born Alan David Yorkin on February 22, 1926, in Washington, Pennsylvania. At age 16, he enlisted in the U.S. Navy, serving during World War II. Yorkin earned a degree in engineering from Carnegie Tech, now Carnegie Mellon University, in Pittsburgh.

In 1950, young Bud Yorkin was the "kid stage manager" of the production team for NBC's The Colgate Comedy Hour hosted by the new comedy sensations Jerry Lewis and Dean Martin and written by Ed Simmons and Norman Lear. At one point, Yorkin asked Jerry Lewis for a favor. His sister had a young son who'd been stricken with muscular dystrophy and was dying from it, and Yorkin asked Lewis if he could possibly make an announcement at the show's end to ask viewers to donate to the newly founded Muscular Dystrophy Association. Lewis made the appeal and "the money rolled in," and that was the start of Lewis's life-long commitment and his subsequent annual Labor Day telethon that ultimately raised over $2 billion for the MDA.

In 1954, Yorkin became the producer of NBC's The Tony Martin Show, a 15-minute variety program which preceded the nightly news on Monday evenings. In 1955, he produced and directed the live 11-episode half-hour military comedy, The Soldiers, starring Hal March, Tom D'Andrea, and John Dehner. In 1956, he became the producer and director of Tennessee Ernie Ford's NBC half-hour comedy/variety program, The Ford Show.

In 1958, Yorkin joined writer/producer Norman Lear to form Tandem Productions, which produced several motion pictures and television specials in the 1960s to 1971 with such major studios as United Artists and Warner Bros. Yorkin directed and produced the 1958 TV special An Evening with Fred Astaire, which won nine Emmy Awards. He later produced many of the hit sitcoms of the 1970s, such as All in the Family, Maude, Good Times, and Sanford and Son.

After his split with Lear, Yorkin went on to form Bud Yorkin Productions. His first sitcom after the split was the unsuccessful Sanford and Son spin-off sitcom Grady. In 1976, he formed TOY Productions with Saul Turteltaub and Bernie Orenstein (who produced Sanford and Son from 1974 to 1977) and their two hits were What's Happening!! and Carter Country. TOY Productions was acquired by Columbia Pictures Television in 1979.

In 1963, Yorkin directed Come Blow Your Horn, starring Frank Sinatra and Lee J. Cobb. In 1967 he directed Divorce American Style starring Dick Van Dyke and Debbie Reynolds and for which Norman Lear and Robert Kaufman were nominated for the Best Screenplay Oscar. Yorkin went on to direct and produce the film Start the Revolution Without Me starring Gene Wilder and Donald Sutherland in 1970 which has become a cult classic. He also directed the film Twice in a Lifetime in 1985, starring Gene Hackman.

In 1999, he and Lear were awarded the Women in Film Lucy Award in recognition of excellence and innovation in creative works that have enhanced the perception of women through the medium of television. In 2002, Yorkin was inducted into the Television Hall of Fame.

Yorkin died on August 18, 2015, at the age of 89. He was married to actress Cynthia Sikes Yorkin, and was the father of television writer and producer Nicole Yorkin from his thirty-year first marriage to Peg Yorkin, co-founder and chair of the Feminist Majority Foundation. He was a member of the Wilshire Boulevard Temple.

== Filmography ==
=== As director ===
- Come Blow Your Horn (1963)
- Never Too Late (1965)
- Divorce American Style (1967)
- Inspector Clouseau (1968)
- Start the Revolution Without Me (1970)
- The Thief Who Came to Dinner (1973)
- Twice in a Lifetime (1985)
- Arthur 2: On the Rocks (1988)
- Love Hurts (1990)

=== As producer ===
- Cold Turkey (executive producer) (1971)
- Blade Runner (executive producer) (1982)
- Deal of the Century (1983)
- Intersection (1994)
- Blade Runner 2049 (2017)
