= Golden Reel Award for Outstanding Achievement in Sound Editing – Sound Effects, Foley, Music, Dialogue and ADR for Non-Theatrical Feature Film Broadcast Media =

Sound editing award

- Country: United States
- Presented by: Motion Picture Sound Editors
- Currently held by: Mandell Winter, David Esparza, Hamilton Sterling, Will Digby, Micah Loken, Sang Kim, Eryne Prine, Mark "Vordo" Wlodarkiewicz, Dan O'Connell, John Cucci – Infinite (2021)

The Golden Reel Award for Outstanding Achievement in Sound Editing – Sound Effects, Foley, Music, Dialogue and ADR for Non-Theatrical Feature Film Broadcast Media is an annual award given by the Motion Picture Sound Editors. It honors sound editors whose work has warranted merit in the field of cinema; in this case, their work in the field of non-theatrical film; i.e. films that go direct-to-video or direct-to-streaming. It was first awarded in 1999, for films released the previous year, under the title Best Sound Editing – Direct to Video – Sound. From 1999 until 2011, the award honored both animated and live-action films. The award has been given with its existing title since 2018.

== Winners and nominees ==
=== 1990s ===
Year	Film	Winners/Nominees
1998	Best Sound Editing – Direct to Video – Sound	
1998	Young Hercules	Mathew Waters (supervising sound editor); Tim Boggs (supervising ADR editor); Dorian Cheah, Lisle Engle, George Haddad, Michael Mullane, Kelly Vandever (sound effects editors); Tony Suraci (Foley editor); Louis Creveling, Jason George, Danielle Ghent, Robert Jackson (dialogue editors)
1998	Adventures in Odyssey: A Stranger Among Us	
1998	Batman & Mr. Freeze: SubZero	
1998	Belle's Magical World	
1998	The Brave Little Toaster Goes to Mars	
1998	Dennis the Menace Strikes Again	
1998	Scooby-Doo on Zombie Island	
1999	Best Sound Editing – Direct to Video – Sound Editorial	
1999	Alvin and the Chipmunks Meet Frankenstein	Burton Weinstein (supervising sound editor); Scott Kolden (sound effects editor); Clark Conrad, Jay Keiser (ADR editors); David De Coster, Adam DeCoster, Sharon Michaels, Timothy Pearson, Paige Pollack, Noel Vought (Foley artists); John Asman, Sam Black, David M. Weishaar (re-recording mixers); Jeff Courtie (Foley mixer); Michael S. Wren (recordist)
1999	Animaniacs: Wakko's Wish	Robert Hargreaves (supervising sound editor); Mark Keatts (supervising dialogue editor); Kelly Ann Foley (supervising ADR editor); George Brooks (sound effects editor); Linda Di Franco, John Hegedes (dialogue editors)
1999	Bartok the Magnificent	Mark Server (supervising sound/Foley editor); Scott Seymann (supervising dialogue editor); Michael Ferdie (supervising ADR editor); Robert Bender, Jeff Snodgrass, Fiona Trayler, Tom Wheeler (sound effects editors)
1999	The Christmas Lamb	Gregory Cathcart, Gary Falcone, Joe Pizzulo (supervising sound editors); Devon Bowman, Sanaa Kelley (dialogue editors)
1999	Mickey's Once Upon a Christmas	Jennifer Mertens (supervising sound/ADR editor); Thomas A. Harris (supervising Foley editor); Eric Hertsguaard (supervising dialogue editor); Rick Hammel, Brian F. Mars, Otis Van Osten, Charles Rychwalski, Kenneth Young (sound effects editors)
1999	Revelation	Mark Beck (supervising sound editor); Alan deGraaf (supervising Foley editor); Steve Munro (supervising dialogue editor); Tim Roberts (supervising ADR editor); Colin Baxter (sound effects editor); Catherine Hutton, David Drainie Taylor (dialogue editors)
1999	Scooby-Doo! and the Witch's Ghost	Cecil Broughton, Tim Gedemer (supervising sound editors); Stuart Ablaza (supervising Foley editor); Tim Iverson (supervising ADR editor); John Bires (sound effects/Foley editor); Rick Hinson, Bruce Greenspan, Jim Hearn, Rick Hinson, Kerry Iverson (sound effects editors)

=== 2000s ===
Year	Film	Winners/Nominees
2000	Scooby-Doo and the Alien Invaders	Tim Gedemer (supervising sound editor), Cecil Broughton (supervising Foley editor), Kerry Iverson (supervising dialogue editor), Rick Hinson (sound editor), Stuart Ablaza (Foley editor), Jim Hearn (dialogue editor)
2000	An American Tail: The Mystery of the Night Monster	Burton Weinstein (supervising sound editor); Scott Kolden (sound effects editor); Michael C. Gutierrez (Foley editor); Geoff McNiel, Michelle C. Stein (dialogue editors); Jay Keiser (ADR editor)
2000	The Little Mermaid II: Return to the Sea	David E. Stone (supervising sound editor), Vanessa Theme Ament (supervising Foley editor), Mary Andrews (supervising ADR editor), Donald Flick (sound effects editor)
2000	Pilgrim	Mark Beck (supervising sound editor), Virginia Storey (supervising Foley editor), Jonas Kuhnemann (supervising dialogue editor/supervising ADR editor)
2000	Road Rage	Mark Beck (supervising sound editor); Virginia Storey (supervising Foley editor); Katherine Fitzgerald (supervising dialogue editor); Scot Marshall (supervising ADR editor); Robert Carli, Steven Toepell (sound effects editors)
2000	Stonebrook	David Bondelevitch (supervising sound editor/supervising dialogue editor); Greg Back (supervising Foley editor); Laurence A. Ellis (supervising ADR editor); Barry Keys, Scott Spencer, Joseph Zappala, Donald P. Zappala (sound effects editors)
2000	Tribulation	Steve Munro (supervising sound editor); Virginia Storey (supervising Foley editor); Ray Campbell (supervising dialogue editor); Tim Roberts (supervising ADR editor); Colin Baxter, Ken Cade (sound effects editors); David Drainie Taylor (dialogue editor)
2000	Turbulence 2: Fear of Flying	Dorian Cheah, Paula Fairfield (supervising sound editors); Robert Jackson (supervising dialogue editor/supervising ADR editor); Sarah Smith (sound effects editor/Foley editor); Benjamin L. Cook, Craig Jurkiewicz, David Mann, Michael Mullane, Carla Murray, Anne Slack (sound effects editors); David Grant, Steve Scoville (dialogue editors); Jed M. Dodge, Jason George (ADR editors)
2001	Best Sound Editing – Direct to Video	
2001	A Texas Funeral	William Dotson (supervising sound editor); Harry Cohen (sound designer/sound effects editor); Pembrooke Andrews (supervising Foley editor); Cathie Speakman (supervising dialogue/ADR editor); Jeff K. Brunello, Rebecca Hanck, Jeffrey R. Whitcher (sound effects editors); Frederick H. Stahly (dialogue editor)
2001	Apocalypse IV: Judgment	Steven Toepell (supervising sound editor); Steve Hammond, Virginia Storey (supervising Foley editors); Wayne Swingle (supervising dialogue/ ADR editor)
2001	Manhattan Steamroller: The Christmas Angel	Victor Iorillo, Doug Kent (supervising sound editors); Michael Babcock, John Edwards-Younger, Jeff Sawyer (sound effects editors); Larry Goeb (ADR editor)
2001	Mannheim Steamroller: Fresh Aire 8	Victor Iorillo (supervising sound editor), Michael Babcock (sound effects editor), Larry Goeb (ADR editor)
2001	Road to Redemption	Mathew Waters (supervising sound editor); Thomas Jones (supervising ADR editor); Benjamin L. Cook, Michael Mullane, Johanna Turner (sound effects editors); Robert Getty, Michael Hertlein (dialogue editors); Alec St. John (Foley editor)
2001	Scooby-Doo and the Cyber Chase	Cecil Broughton, Tim Gedemer (supervising sound editor); Eileen Horta (supervising Foley editor); Mark Keatts (supervising dialogue editor); Rick Hinson, Glenn Oyabe, Dave Rowe (sound effects editors)
2001	Tremors 3: Back to Perfection	Joseph Zappala (supervising sound editor), Barry Keys (supervising Foley editor), George R. Groves Jr. (supervising dialogue editor/sound effects editor), Scott Bernstein (supervising ADR editor), Greg Back (sound effects editor), James Christopher (dialogue editor)
2002	The Adventures of Tom Thumb and Thumbelina	Timothy J. Borquez, Thomas Syslo (supervising sound editors), Eric Freeman (supervising dialogue editor), Eileen Horta (supervising ADR editor)
2002	Cowboy Up	Patrick Dodd, John C. Stuver (supervising sound editors); Christopher Emerson, Michael Jonascu, Michael Payne (sound effects editors); Francesca Estevez (dialogue editor); Anne Laing (ADR editor); David Bondelevitch, Daniel DiPrima (music editors)
2002	Deceived	Mark Shnuriwsky (supervising sound editor), Steve Hammond (supervising Foley editor), Janice Ierulli (supervising dialogue editor), Robert Warchol (sound effects editor), Gary Koftinoff (music editor)
2002	Larryboy: The Cartoon Adventures- Fly By Might and Angry Eyebrows	Scott Pinkerton (supervising sound editor/dialogue editor/ADR/music editor), Thomas Chan (supervising sound/music editor)
2002	Left Behind II: Tribulation Force	Tom Bjelic (supervising sound editor), Virginia Storey (supervising Foley editor), Brandon Walker (supervising dialogue editor), Gary Koftinoff (music editor)
2002	Rock My World	Mark Beck (supervising sound editor), Steve Hammond (supervising Foley editor), Jonas Kuhnemann (supervising dialogue editor), Wayne Swingle (supervising ADR editor), Mara Ladico (sound effects editor), Jonathan Goldsmith (music editor)
2002	The Skulls II	Nelson Ferreira (supervising sound editor); Rob Bertola, Tony Currie, Tim Isle (sound effects editors)
2002	Storm Watch	Patrick M. Griffith (supervising sound editor/foley/dialogue/ADR editor), Timothy Pearson (supervising Foley editor), Stephen M. Galvin (supervising dialogue/ADR editor), Steve McCarty (sound editor)
2003	Best Sound Editing in Direct to Video	
2003	Bionicle: Mask of Light	Timothy J. Borquez (supervising sound editor/music editor); Roy Braverman (supervising sound editor); Matt Brown (supervising dialogue editor); Jason Freedman, Eric Freeman, Morgan Gerhard, Gordon Hookailo, Jeff Hutchins, Brian F. Mars, Paul Menichini, Daisuke Sawa, Thomas Syslo (sound editors)
2003	101 Dalmatians II: Patch's London Adventure	Donald J. Malouf (supervising sound editor); Dan Yale (supervising Foley editor); Thomas Whiting (supervising dialogue/ADR editor); G.W. Brown, Adam Kopald, Todd Toon (sound effects editors); Dominick Certo (music editor)
2003	Imaginext: Fortress of the Dragon	
2003	Inspector Gadget 2	Vic Kaspar (sound designer/supervising dialogue/ADR editor); Stefan Kluka (supervising Foley editor); John Kincade (supervising ADR editor); Julius Chan, Liam Egan, Mark Franken (sound effects editors); Matt Connolly (dialogue editor); Simon Leadley, Tim Ryan (music editors)
2003	Left Behind II: Tribulation Force	Tom Bjelic (supervising sound editor), Virginia Storey (supervising Foley editor), Brandon Walker (supervising dialogue editor), Gary Koftinoff (music editor)
2003	Stitch! The Movie	Otis Van Osten (sound designer), Jody Thomas (supervising Foley editor); Jason Oliver (supervising dialogue/ADR editor); Ron Salaises, Kenneth Young (sound effects editors); Dominick Certo (music/scoring editor)
2003	Timequest	Mark Beck (supervising sound editor); Steve Hammond (supervising Foley editor); Jonas Kuhnemann (supervising dialogue editor); Danielle McBride, David Moffat (sound editors); Daniel Peter Kolton (music editor)
2003	Unconditional Love	Avram D. Gold (supervising sound/dialogue/ADR editor); Richard L. Anderson (supervising sound editor); Jim Weidman (supervising music editor); Elliott Koretz, George Simpson, David A. Whittaker (sound effects editors); Rick Mitchell (Foley editor); Donald J. Malouf (dialogue editor); Barbara McDermott, David Olson, Joe E. Rand (music editors)
2003	Under Heavy Fire	
2004	Bionicle 2: Legends of Metru Nui	Timothy J. Borquez (supervising sound/music editor); Roy Braverman (supervising sound editor); Eric Freeman (supervising dialogue editor); Doug Andham (supervising ADR editor); Michael Geisler, Gordon Hookailo, Mark Howlett, Jeff Hutchins, Marc Mailand, Brian F. Mars, Paul Menichini, Daisuke Sawa, Thomas Syslo (sound effects editors); Jason Freedman (Foley editor)
2004	The Chronicles of Riddick: Dark Fury	Scott Martin Gershin, Glynna Grimala (supervising sound editors); Bryan Bowen, Bryan Celano, Lisle Engle, Tom Ozanich, Steve Tushar, Peter Zinda (sound effects editors)
2004	Hollywood North	Nelson Ferreira (supervising sound/dialogue/ADR editor), Kevin Banks (supervising sound/music/sound effects editor), Craig Henighan (sound effects editor)
2004	The Lion King 1½	Ronald Eng (supervising sound editor); Willard Overstreet (supervising Foley editor); Tammy Fearing (supervising dialogue/ADR editor); Doug Jackson, Chuck Michael, Steve Tushar (sound effects editors); Dominick Certo (music editor)
2004	Mickey's Twice Upon a Christmas	Donald J. Malouf (supervising sound editor); Dan Yale (supervising Foley editor); Thomas Whiting (supervising dialogue/ADR editor); Todd Toon (sound effects editor); Charles W. Ritter (Foley editor); G.W. Brown, Devon Heffley Curry, Lisa J. Levine (dialogue editors); Tammy Fearing (ADR editor); Dominick Certo (music editor)
2004	The Skulls III	Nelson Ferreira (supervising sound/dialogue/ADR editor), Rob Bertola (supervising sound/ADR editor), Mike Welker (ADR editor), Kevin Banks (music editor)
2005	Ark	Mike Draghi (supervising sound editor); Stephen P. Robinson (sound designer); Ernie Sheesley (supervising Foley editor); Gordon Suffield (supervising dialogue editor); Kyle Clausen, Mike Garcia (sound effects editors); Steven A. Saltzman (music editor); Adam DeCoster, Paige Pollack (Foley artists)
2005	The Batman vs. Dracula	Timothy J. Borquez, Thomas Syslo (supervising sound editors); Tony Orozco (supervising Foley editor); Mark Keatts (supervising dialogue editor); Kelly Ann Foley (supervising ADR editor); Doug Andham, Daniel Ben-Shimon, Keith Dickens, Ron Ruzicka, Daisuke Sawa (sound effects editors); Mike Garcia, Mark Keefer, Chuck Smith (dialogue editors); Johs Wu (music editor); Sean Rowe (Foley artist)
2005	Bionicle 3: Web of Shadows	Timothy J. Borquez (supervising sound/music editor); Thomas Syslo (supervising sound editor); Tony Orozco (supervising Foley editor); Eric Freeman (supervising dialogue editor); Robert Crew (supervising ADR editor); Roy Braverman (sound effects editor); Doug Andham, Keith Dickens, Jason Freedman, Mark Howlett, Jeff Hutchins, Daisuke Sawa, Greg Schorer (sound editors); Brian F. Mars (dialogue editor); Sean Rowe (Foley artist)
2005	Control	Jack Levy (supervising sound editor), Daniel Colman (sound designer), Vince Balunas (supervising dialogue editor), Chris Boyett (supervising ADR editor), Chris McGeary (music editor), Doug Madick (Foley artist)
2005	Cypher	Stephen Barden, Craig Henighan (supervising sound editors); Joe Bracciale (dialogue editor); Jill Purdy (ADR editor); Tom Kramer (music editor)
2005	Left Behind: World at War	Mark Beck (supervising sound editor), Virginia Storey (supervising Foley editor/artist), Fred Brennan (supervising dialogue editor), Richard Calistan (supervising ADR editor), Dan Sexton (sound editor), Gary Chang (music editor)
2005	Nothing	Stephen Barden, Craig Henighan (supervising sound editors); Jill Purdy (dialogue editor); Kevin Banks (music editor); John Sievert (Foley artist)
2006	Best Sound Editing in a Direct-to-Video Project	
2006	The Fox and the Hound 2	Donald J. Malouf (supervising sound editor); Dan Yale (supervising Foley editor); Thomas Whiting (supervising dialogue/ADR editor); Charles W. Ritter (sound effects/dialogue editor); Todd Toon (sound effects editor); Tanya Noel Hill, Charles Martin Inouye (music editors)
2006	Connors' War	Mark Lanza (supervising sound editor); Vic Radulich (supervising dialogue editor); Michael Mullane (sound effects editor); James Bairian, Louis Castle (music editors)
2006	Leroy & Stitch	Melinda Dilger, Otis Van Osten (supervising sound editors); Trevor Sperry (supervising Foley editor); Jason Oliver (supervising dialogue/ADR editor); Wes Otis, Jeff Shiffman (sound effects editors); Michael Tavera (music editor)
2006	Three and a Half	Mark Beck (supervising sound editor), Steve Hammond (supervising Foley editor), Jonas Kuhnemann (supervising dialogue editor), Richard Calistan (supervising ADR editor), Bill Halliday (music editor)
2006	Ultimate Avengers: The Movie	Clive H. Mizumoto, Ron Salaises (supervising sound editors); John Brengman (supervising Foley editor); Mike Garcia (supervising dialogue editor); Mike Draghi (sound effects/dialogue/music editor); Kyle Clausen, Timothy A. Cleveland, Paul J. Diller, Stephen P. Robinson, Kenneth Young (sound effects editors); Mark Ryan (music editor)
2006	Ultimate Avengers 2: Rise of the Panther	Mike Draghi, Stephen P. Robinson (supervising sound editors); David Ball (supervising Foley editor); Mike Garcia (supervising dialogue editor); Kyle Clausen, Mark Lanza (sound effects editors); David W. Barr (ADR editor); Mark Ryan (music editor)
2007	Best Sound Editing – Direct to Video	
2007	Return to House on Haunted Hill	Bill R. Dean (supervising sound editor); Dane A. Davis (sound designer); Christopher Alba (supervising Foley editor); Stephanie Brown (supervising dialogue editor); Bobbi Banks (supervising ADR editor); Drew Yerys (sound editor); Angela Hackner, Paul Hackner, Andrew Twite, Greg Ward (dialogue editors); Richard Adrian, Greg Hedgepath (sound designers)
2007	Superman: Doomsday	Robert Hargreaves (supervising sound editor/designer/Foley artist); Mark Keatts (supervising sound editor/sound designer); Mike Garcia, Mark Keefer (dialogue editors); Christine H. Luethje (music editor); John Hegedes (foley recordist)
2007	Amazing Journey: The Story of The Who	Bill R. Dean (supervising sound editor); Steve Nelson (supervising Foley editor); Paul Hackner (supervising dialogue editor); Greg Hedgepath, James Morioka, Anthony Roza, Drew Yerys (sound editor); Stephanie Brown (dialogue editor); Paul Crowder (music editor)
2007	The Invincible Iron Man	Mike Draghi, Stephen P. Robinson (supervising sound editors/sound designers); David Ball (supervising Foley editor); Mike Garcia (supervising dialogue editor); Kyle Clausen, Stuart Provine, Tim Walston (sound editors); Mark Ryan (music editor)
2007	The Veteran	Mark Shnuriwsky (supervising sound editor/sound designer); Joe Mancuso (supervising dialogue editor); Richard Calistan (supervising ADR editor); Mark Beck, Kevin Howard, Dan Sexton (sound effects editors); Alastair Gray, Rob Hegedus, Jonas Kuhnemann (dialogue editors); Eric Cadesky, Nick Dyer (music editors)
2008	Batman: Gotham Knight	Robert Hargreaves (supervising sound editor/sound designer/sound effects editor/Foley artist); Mark Keatts (supervising dialogue editor); Kelly Ann Foley, Mike Garcia, Mark Keefer (dialogue editors); Christine H. Luethje (music editor)
2008	Futurama: Bender's Game	Travis Powers (supervising sound editor), Paul D. Calder (supervising dialogue editor), Scott Schirle (music editor)
2008	Get Smart's Bruce and Lloyd: Out of Control	Gregory M. Gerlich (supervising sound/ADR editor); Sandy Berman (sound designer); David M. Cowan (supervising dialogue editor); Stuart Calderon, Timothy A. Cleveland, Paul J. Diller (sound effects editors); Jeremy J. Gordon (ADR editor); Robb Boyd (music editor); Shelley Roden, Jody Thomas (Foley artists),
2008	Justice League: The New Frontier	Timothy J. Borquez, Thomas Syslo (supervising sound editors); Mark Keatts (supervising dialogue/ADR editor); Doug Andham, Keith Dickens, Eric Freeman, Tony Orozco, Daisuke Sawa (sound effects editors); Kelly Ann Foley, Mike Garcia, Mark Keefer (dialogue editors); Kevin Manthei (music editor); Diane Greco, Sean Rowe (Foley artists)
2008	Weirdsville	Mark Gingras (supervising sound editor), Steve Hammond (supervising Foley editor), Allan Fung (supervising dialogue editor), John Rowley (music editor)
2009	Family Guy: Something, Something, Something, Dark Side	Bob Newlan (supervising sound editor); Andrew Ellerd (sound designer); Brian Nichols (sound effects editor); Patrick S. Clark, Mark Eklund (dialogue editor); Stan Jones, Douglas M. Lackey (music editors); Dale W. Perry (Foley artist),
2009	B.O.B.'s Big Break	John Marquis (supervising sound editor); Jonathan Klein (supervising Foley editor); P.K. Hooker (sound effects editor); Adam Milo Smalley (music editor); Alyson Dee Moore, John Roesch (Foley artists)
2009	Caprica: Pilot	Daniel Colman (supervising sound editor/sound designer); Jack Levy (supervising sound editor); Sam C. Lewis (supervising Foley editor); Vince Balunas (supervising dialogue/ADR editor); Jeff K. Brunello (Foley editor); Michael Baber (music editor); Doug Madick, Richard Partlow (Foley artists)
2009	Exit Speed	George Haddad (supervising sound/dialogue/Foley editor); David Barbee, Bradley C. Katona (sound designers/sound effects editors); Hugh Murphy (supervising Foley editor); Edmund J. Lachmann (supervising ADR editor/dialogue/ADR editor); David Baldwin (sound effects editor); Charlie Kolander (dialogue editor); Giorgio Bertuccelli (music editor); Zane D. Bruce, Joseph T. Sabella (Foley artists)
2009	Lionelville: Destination Adventure	Rick Hinson (supervising sound editor); Jeffrey Kettle (supervising Foley editor); William Hinson (sound effects editor); Sanaa Kelley, Cynthia Merrill (Foley artists)
2009	Tinker Bell and the Lost Treasure	Donald J. Malouf (supervising sound editor/sound designer); Dan Yale (supervising Foley editor); Thomas Whiting (supervising dialogue/ADR editor); Randy Babajtis (sound effects editor); Eliza Pollack Zebert (dialogue editor); Dominick Certo (music editor); John T. Cucci, Dan O'Connell (Foley artists)
2009	Wrong Turn 3: Left for Dead	Trip Brock, Peter D. Lago (supervising sound editors); Steven Avila (sound designer); Alexander Pugh (sound effects editor); Brian S.M. Wroth (dialogue editor); Ginger Geary (Foley artist)

=== 2010s ===
Year	Film	Winners/Nominees
2010	Best Sound Editing – Direct to Video – Live Action	
2010	30 Days of Night: Dark Days	Eric Lalicata (supervising sound editor); Ryan Gegenheimer (sound designer/sound effects editor); Matthew C. Beville (supervising Foley editor); Dhyana Carlton-Tims (supervising dialogue editor, dialogue editor); Sean Gray, Eryne Prine (sound effects editors); John Sanacore, Ryan Young (ADR editors); Jaclyn Newman Dorn (music editor); Alex Ullrich (Foley artist)
2010	Caprica: Apotheosis	Daniel Colman (supervising sound/sound designer); Jack Levy (supervising sound editor); Jeff K. Brunello (sound designer); Sam C. Lewis (supervising Foley editor); Vince Balunas (supervising dialogue editor); Sara Bencivenga (supervising ADR editor); Stefani Feldman (group ADR editor); Michael Baber (music editor); Doug Madick, Monique Reymond (Foley artists)
2010	Lost Boys: The Thirst	Steven Avila (supervising sound editor/sound designer); Trip Brock (supervising sound editor); Peter D. Lago (sound designer); Chris McGeary (supervising music editor); Alexander Pugh (sound effects editor); Irene Montero (Foley editor); Skip Williams, Brian S.M. Wroth (dialogue editors); Ben Whitver (ADR editor); Jenny Leite (music editor); Tara Blume, Rick Owens (Foley artists)
2011	Love	Bob Kellough (supervising sound editor/designer), Craig Henighan (supervising sound editor), Andy Koyama (sound effects editor), Steve Baine (Foley artist)
2011	Beethoven's Christmas Adventure	Patrick Giraudi (supervising sound editor); Steven Avila, Peter D. Lago, Alexander Pugh (sound effects editors); Trip Brock (Foley editor); John Gilbert (dialogue editor); Michael T. Ryan (music editor); Lorita de la Cerna, Rick Owens (Foley artists)
2011	Street Kings 2: Motor City	Eric Lalicata (supervising sound editor); Ryan Gegenheimer, Charles Maynes (sound designers); John Sanacore (supervising Foley editor); Joshua Aaron Johnson (supervising dialogue editor); Amy Felton (supervising ADR editor); Cory Milano (music editor); Alex Ullrich (Foley artist)
2012	Fire with Fire	David Barber (supervising sound editor); Sean Gray, Ken Skoglund (sound designers); Gonzalo Espinoza (supervising Foley/ADR editor/Foley artist); David Kitchens (Foley artist)
2012	12 Dogs of Christmas: Great Puppy Rescue	Carlos Sanches (supervising sound editor); Josh Eckberg, Peter D. Lago (sound designers); John Sanacore (supervising Foley editor); Jason Oliver (supervising dialogue editor); Kurt Godwin, Wes Kobernick, Lesley Saucier, Jake Zuckerberg (sound effects editors); Andrzej Warzocha (music editor); Gregg Barbanell, Alex Ullrich (Foley artists)
2012	Cowgirls 'n Angels	Eric Lalicata (supervising sound editor); Eryne Prine (sound designer); Dhyana Carlton-Tims (supervising dialogue editor); Sergio R. Rocha (sound effects editor); Tara Blume, Alex Ullrich (Foley artists)
2012	El Gringo	Jon Vogl (supervising sound editor); David Barbee, Steve Papagiannis (sound designers); Peggy Blum (supervising Foley editor); Matt Coby (supervising dialogue editor); Bradley C. Katona, Jesse Kees (sound effects editors); Monique Reymond (Foley artist)
2012	Item 47	Andrew DeCristofaro (supervising sound editor); Ann Scibelli, Tim Walston (sound designers); Kerry Carmean-Williams (supervising Foley editor); Glynna Grimala (supervising ADR editor); Tim Kimmel (supervising dialogue editor); Michael Payne, Gayle Wesley (sound effects editors); Gary A. Hecker, Gary Marullo (Foley artists)
2012	Osombie	Peter D. Lago, Carlos Sanches (sound designers); Phillip Raves (supervising Foley editor/Foley editor); Robert Ramirez, Jake Zuckerberg (sound effects editors); James Schafer (music editor); Aaron Davies, Anthony Ferro, Andrea Laird, Cindy Raves (Foley artists)
2012	Werewolf: The Beast Among Us	Glenn T. Morgan (supervising sound editor); Mike Chock (sound designer); Ben Wilkins (supervising Foley editor); Joe Dzuban, Justin Dzuban, Lauren Hadaway (sound editors); Chris Foster (music editor); Stella Valente (Foley artist)
2013	Agent Carter	Andrew DeCristofaro (supervising sound editor); Michael Payne, Ann Scibelli (sound designers); Laura Harris Atkinson (supervising dialogue editor); Gary A. Hecker, Gary Marullo (Foley artists)
2013	The Baytown Outlaws	Eric Lalicata (supervising sound editor); Jeremy B. Davis, Ryan Gegenheimer (sound designers); Shaun Cunningham (supervising Foley editor); Tom Boykin (supervising dialogue editor); Tara Blume (Foley artist)
2013	Empire State	David Barber (supervising sound/dialogue editor); Gonzalo Espinoza (supervising foley/ADR editor); Steven Avila, Sean Gray, Peter D. Lago (sound effects editors); Ben Zarai (dialogue editor); David Kitchens (Foley artist)
2013	Evidence	Darren 'Sunny' Warkentin (supervising sound editor/sound designer); Lon Bender (supervising sound editor); Kris Fenske (sound designer); Shawn Kennelly (supervising Foley editor); Chris Johnston (supervising dialogue/ADR editor, re-recording mixer); Tim Hoogenakker, Anthony Vanchure (sound editors); Julie Pearce (music editor)
2013	The Frozen Ground	David Barber (supervising sound editor); Gonzalo Espinoza (supervising foley/ADR editor); Steven Avila, Peter D. Lago, Alexander Pugh (sound effects editors); Sean Gray, Ben Zarai (dialogue editors); David Paul Dorn (music editor); David Kitchens (Foley artist)
2013	Lord of Darkness	Trip Brock (supervising sound editor); Peter D. Lago (sound designer); Greg Mauer (supervising Foley editor); Steven Avila, Alexander Pugh (sound effects editors); Matt Salib, Ian Shedd, Kate Sheil (Foley editors); Jackie Johnson, Brian S.M. Wroth (dialogue editors); Ben Whitver (ADR editor); James Bailey (Foley artist)
2014	Stonehearst Asylum	Lon Bender (supervising sound editor/sound designer); Bill R. Dean (supervising sound editor); Kris Fenske (sound designer); Rachel Chancey (supervising Foley editor); Bobbi Banks (supervising dialogue/ADR editor); Chad Birmingham, John Carbonara (supervising music editors); Patrick Cicero, Dino Dimuro, Hector C. Gika, David Raines, Allan Zaleski (sound effects editors); Ryan Collison (Foley artist)
2014	The Christmas Dragon	Carlos Sanches (supervising sound/dialogue/ADR editor/sound designer); Joshua Aaron Johnson (sound designer); Phillip Raves (supervising Foley editor); James Schafer (supervising music editor); Scott Evan Anderson, Keith R. Anderson (Foley artists)
2014	Leprechaun: Origins	Lon Bender, Darren 'Sunny' Warkentin (supervising sound editors); Rusty Dunn, Kris Fenske (sound designers); Geordy Sincavage (supervising Foley editor); Lauren Hadaway (supervising dialogue/ADR editor); Steven A. Saltzman (supervising music editor); Frank Buckner, Dino Dimuro, Anthony Vanchure, Ryan Wassil (sound effects editors); Tim Hoogenakker (dialogue/ADR editor); David De Coster, Sanaa Kelley (Foley artist)
2014	The Prince	David Barber (supervising sound/dialogue editor); Sean Gray, Ben Zarai (sound designers); Gonzalo Espinoza (supervising foley/dialogue/ADR editor); David Kitchens (Foley artist)
2014	Red Sky	David Barber (supervising sound/dialogue/ADR editor); Ben Zarai (supervising sound editor); Ken Skoglund (sound designer); Gonzalo Espinoza (supervising Foley editor); Tim Williams (supervising music editor); Sean Gray, Steve Urban (sound effects editors); David Kitchens (Foley artist)
2014	Wer	Trip Brock (supervising sound editor); Ben Whitver (supervising ADR editor); Steven Avila, Peter D. Lago, Alexander Pugh (sound effects editors); Matt Salib (Foley editor/artist); T.J. Boyd, Greg Mauer, Raymond Park (Foley editors); Jackie Johnson, Ian Shedd (dialogue/ADR editor); James Bailey (Foley artist)
2015	All the Wilderness	Steven Avila, Trip Brock (supervising sound editors); Ian Shedd (supervising dialogue editor); Ben Whitver (supervising ADR editor); Rickley W. Dumm, Alexander Pugh (sound effects editors); Terry Boyd Jr. (Foley editor); Jackie Johnson (dialogue/ADR editor); Kenny Woods (music editor); Sanaa Kelley, Matt Salib (Foley artists)
2015	7 Minutes	Trip Brock (supervising sound editor); Steven Avila (sound designer); Ian Shedd (supervising dialogue editor); Ben Whitver (supervising ADR editor, dialogue/ADR editor); Raymond Park, Alexander Pugh (sound effects editors); Terry Boyd Jr., Matt Salib (Foley artists)
2015	Last Shift	Dave Chmela, Michael Orlowski (supervising sound editors); Colin Hart, Lee Riley (sound designers); Ben Conley, Joy Elett, Jeff King, James Rouse (sound effects editors); Ryan Maguire (Foley editor); Adam Barber (music editor); Tara Blume (Foley artist)
2015	Listening	David Barber (supervising sound editor/sound effects editor), David Kitchens (supervising sound editor/Foley artist), Steve Urban (sound designer), Gonzalo Espinoza (supervising Foley/ADR editor), Ben Zarai (supervising dialogue editor), Edward White (supervising music editor), Sean Gray (sound effects/dialogue/ADR editor)
2015	Lost River	Lon Bender (supervising sound editor); Huldar Freyr Arnarson, Kris Fenske (sound designers); Geordy Sincavage (supervising Foley editor); Robert Fernandez, Greg Hedgepath (supervising dialogue editors); Jason Tregoe Newman (supervising music editor); Jonah Guelzo, Peter Staubli, Scott Wolf, Allan Zaleski (sound effects editors); Dan Kenyon, Ryan Wassil (Foley editors); Paul Hackner, Daniel S. Irwin (dialogue/ADR editors); Tara Blume, Vincent Guisetti (Foley artists)
2015	War Pigs	Carlos Sanches (supervising sound editor); Charles Maynes, Matthew Thomas Hall (sound designers/effects editors); Phillip Raves (supervising Foley editor); Gregory M. Gerlich (supervising dialogue editor); Alex Kharlamov (supervising music editor); Joshua Aaron Johnson (sound effects editor); Stephanie Brown, David M. Cowan, Matt Vowles (dialogue/ADR editors); Scott Evan Anderson (Foley artist)
2015	We Are Still Here	Tom Boykin, Eric Lalicata, Dan Snow (supervising sound editors); Ryan Gegenheimer (sound designer); Brian Dunlop (supervising dialogue editor); Tara Blume (Foley artist)
2016	The Duel	David Barber (supervising sound editor); Sean Gray, Ken Skoglund, Steve Urban (sound effects editors); Micah Loken (dialogue editor); Michael Kreple (ADR editor); Ben Zarai (music editor); Gonzalo Espinoza, David Kitchens (Foley artists)
2016	Broken Vows	Sean Higgins, Eric Lalicata (supervising sound editors); Dan Snow (audio lead); Ryan Gegenheimer, Kyle Lane (sound effects editors); Leah Putlek (Foley editor); Dhyana Carlton-Tims (dialogue editor)
2016	Rattle the Cage	Trip Brock (supervising sound editor); Raymond Park (sound designer); Bruce Stubblefield (supervising dialogue editor); Zheng Jia, John Kochanczyk, Rory O'Shea, G.W. Pope III (sound effects editors); Terry Boyd Jr. (Foley editor); Ian Shedd (dialogue editor); Sanaa Kelley, Matt Salib (Foley artists)
2016	The Thinning	Trip Brock (supervising sound editor); Raymond Park (sound designer); Ian Shedd (supervising dialogue editor); Ben Whitver (supervising ADR editor); Sean Heissinger, Zheng Jia (sound effects editors); Jordan McClain (Foley editor); Sanaa Kelley, Matt Salib (Foley artists)
2016	USS Indianapolis: Men of Courage	David Barber (supervising sound editor); Roland N. Thai (sound designer); David Barbee, Sean Gray, Ben Zarai (sound effects editors); David Kitchens (Foley editor); Karol Urban (dialogue editor); Zigmund Gron (music editor); Gonzalo Espinoza (Foley artist)
2017	Outstanding Achievement in Sound Editing – Sound Effects, Foley, Music, Dialogue and ADR for Non-Theatrical Feature Film Broadcast Media	
2017	In Search of Fellini	Ben Zarai (supervising sound editor/sound designer); David Barber (supervising sound editor/dialogue editor); Michael Lanoue (Foley editor); Michael Kreple (ADR editor); Jennifer Nash (music editor); Gonzalo Espinoza, David Kitchens (Foley artists)
2017	The Babysitter	Dror Mohar (supervising sound editor); Robert Jackson (supervising ADR editor); Jamie Hardt (Foley editor); Mark Ryan, Lodge Worster (music editors); Miguel Barbosa (Foley artist)
2017	Havenhurst	Tom Boykin, Eric Lalicata (supervising sound editors); Alex Weiss (sound designer); Dan Snow (audio lead); Ryan Maguire, Leah Putlek (Foley editors); Kyle Lane (ADR editor); Tara Blume (Foley artist)
2017	Imperial Dreams	Steven Avila, Trip Brock, Raymond Park (sound effects editors); Terry Boyd Jr., Matt Salib (Foley editors); Jackie Johnson, Ian Shedd (dialogue editors); Ben Whitver (ADR editor)
2017	Little Evil	Mac Smith (supervising sound editor); Luke Dunn Gielmuda, Jonathan Greber (Foley editors); Brad Semenoff (dialogue editor); Angela Claverie, Chris McGeary (music editors); Andrea Gard (Foley artist)
2017	Revolt	Ethan Beigel, Chad J. Hughes (supervising sound editors); David Barnaby, Shaun Cunningham, Chris Terhune (sound effects editors); Charlie Kolander (dialogue editor); Carsten Richter (Foley artist)
2018	Extinction	Will Files, P.K. Hooker (supervising sound editors); Lisa J. Levine (supervising ADR editor); Justin M. Davey, Ken McGill (sound effects editors); Ryan Cole, Polly McKinnon (dialogue editors); Brett Pierce (music editor); Steve Baine (Foley artist)
2018	The Christmas Chronicles	Mark Mangini (supervising sound editor); Byron Wilson (supervising dialogue editor); Charlie Campagna, Eliot Connors, Piero Mura (sound effects editors); Ezra Dweck, Albert Gasser (Foley editors); Hugh Waddell (ADR editor); Fernand Bos (music editor)
2018	Game Over, Man!	Bruce Barris, Elliott Koretz (supervising sound editors); Susan Dudeck (supervising dialogue editor); Thom Brennan, Joseph Tsai (Foley editors); Chase Keehn (dialogue editor); Darrell Hall (music editor); Dawn Lunsford, Alicia Stevenson (Foley artists)
2018	My Dinner with Hervé	Odin Benitez, Byron Wilson (supervising sound editors); Charlie Campagna, Greg Hedgepath, Dave McMoyler (sound effects editors); Del Spiva (supervising music editor); Jordan McClain (Foley editor); Michael J. Benavente (dialogue editor); Nicholas Fitzgerald, Lance Povlock (music editors); Geordy Sincavage (Foley artist)
2018	Tau	Mattias Eklund (supervising sound editor); Magnus Alakangas, Alexander Berggren, Fredrik Dalenfjäll, Eric Hector (sound effects editors); Kimberly Harris (dialogue editor); Ulf Olausson (Foley artist)
2019	Togo	Odin Benitez, Todd Toon (supervising sound editors); Martyn Zub (sound designer); Christopher Bonis, Luke Gibleon, Jason King, Adam Kopald (sound effects editors); Walter Spencer (Foley editor); John C. Stuver (dialogue editor); Dave McMoyler (ADR editor); Peter Oso Snell (music editor); Mike Horton, Tim McKeown (Foley artists)
2019	Deadwood: The Movie	Daniel Colman, Mandell Winter (supervising sound editors); Ben Cook (sound designer); Eryne Prine (Foley editor); Brian Armstrong, Shane Hayes, Bernard Weiser (dialogue editors); Dhyana Carlton-Tims, Rob Chen (ADR editors); Stephanie Gangel, Micha Liberman, Jillinda Palmer (music editors)
2019	Escape Plan: The Extractors	David Barber (supervising sound editor), Roland Thai (sound designer), George Haddad (sound effects editor), David Kitchens (Foley editor), Michael Kreple (ADR editor), Ben Zarai (music editor), Gonzalo "Bino" Espinoza (Foley artist)
2019	Guava Island	Trevor Gates (supervising sound editor); Jason Dotts (supervising ADR editor); Matthew Thomas Hall, Paul Knox (sound effects editors); Walter Spencer (Foley editor); Jesse Kees (dialogue editor); Devaughn Watts (music editor); Mike Horton, Tim McKeown (Foley artists)
2019	IO	Mac Smith (supervising sound editor/sound designer), Brandon Proctor (sound designer), Richard Gould (Foley editor), Brad Semenoff (dialogue editor), Chris Gridley (ADR editor), Heikki Kossi (Foley artist)
2019	Lady and the Tramp	Andrew DeCristofaro, Darren 'Sunny' Warkentin (supervising sound editors); David Esparza (sound designer); Bryan Lawson (supervising music editor); Michael Payne, Matthew Wilson (sound effects editors); Geordy Sincavage (Foley editor); Kelly Oxford (dialogue editor); David Stanke (ADR editor); Erica Weis (music editor)
2019	Mary	David Barber (supervising sound editor); Karol Urban (dialogue editor); George Haddad, Roland N. Thai, Steve Urban, Ben Zarai (sound effects editors); David Kitchens (Foley editor); Michael Kreple (ADR editor); Gonzalo Espinoza (Foley artist)
2019	O.G.	Frederic Dubois, Dror Mohar (supervising sound editors); Tapio Liukkonen (Foley artist)

=== 2020s ===
Year	Film	Winners/Nominees	Network
2020	The Ultimate Playlist of Noise	Odin Benitez (supervising sound editor); Russell Topal (sound designer); Ryan Briley (supervising ADR editor); Rustam Gimadlyev (Foley editor); Katerina Tolkishevskaya (music editor); Natalia Syeryakova, Bogdan Zavarzin (Foley artist)	Hulu
2020	Bad Education	Gene Park (supervising sound editor), Ric Schnupp (sound effects editor), Craig Kyllonen (dialogue editor), Colin Alexander (ADR editor), Shari Johanson (music editor)	HBO
2020	Bliss	Steve Boeddeker, Lee Salevan (supervising sound editors); Igor Nikolić (Foley editor); Michael Feuser (dialogue editor); Lidia Tamplenizza (ADR editor); Jay Peck (Foley artist)	Amazon
2020	Blow the Man Down	Chris Foster (supervising sound editor); Laura Heinzinger (Foley editors); Michael Flannery, Matt Rigby (dialogue editors); John Bowen, Nora Linde (ADR editors); Brian McOmber (music editor)	Amazon
2020	Troop Zero	Sean McCormick, Erin Oakley (supervising sound editors); Dylan Barfield, Andrew Neil, Paul Pirola (sound effects editors); Troy Mauri (Foley editor); Robert Chen, Will Riley (dialogue editors); Adrian Medhurst (Foley artist)	Amazon
2020	The Bygone	David Barber (supervising sound editor); Dave Eichhorn, George Haddad, Roland Thai, Ben Zarai (sound effects editors); Michael Kreple (Foley editor); Gonzalo "Bino" Espinoza, David Kitchens (dialogue editors)	Tubi
2020	Dolly Parton's Christmas on the Square	Trip Brock (supervising sound editor); Jacob Ortiz (supervising ADR editor); Marc S. Perlman, Michael T. Ryan (supervising music editors); Raymond Park (sound effects editor); Jackie Johnson, Bruce Stubblefield (dialogue editors); Michael Farrow, Tom Ruttledge (music editors)	Netflix
2020	Safety	Christopher S. Aud, Byron Wilson (supervising sound editors); Steve Durkee (supervising music editor); Phil Barrie, Greg ten Bosch, Aaron Glascock (sound effects editors); Terry Rodman (Foley editor); Daniel Saxlid (dialogue editor); Sanaa Kelley, Matt Salib (Foley artists)	Disney+
2021	Outstanding Achievement in Sound Editing – Non-Theatrical Feature		
2021	Infinite	Mandell Winter, David Esparza (supervising sound editors); Hamilton Sterling (sound designer); Will Digby (sound effects editor); Micah Loken, Sang Kim (dialogue editors); Eryne Prine (Foley editor); Mark "Vordo" Wlodarkiewicz, Dan O'Connell, John Cucci (Foley artists)	Paramount+
2021	Fear of Rain	David Barber (supervising sound editor); David Kitchens (Foley editor); Ben Zarai (sound effects editor); David Barbee (sound designer); Gonzalo "Bino" Espinoza (Foley artist); Michael Kreple (ADR editor)	Hulu
2021	Fear Street Part Two: 1978	Trevor Gates (supervising sound editor); Jason Dotts (supervising dialogue editor); Matthew Thomas Hall, Russell Topal Mark Coffey (sound effects editors); Kristen Hirlinger, Harrison Meyle (dialogue editors); Sandra Fox (Foley artist); Brett "Snacky" Pierce (music editor)	Netflix
2021	The Ice Road	Trip Brock (supervising sound editor); Charles Maynes (sound designer); Jacob Ortiz (supervising ADR editor); Jackie Johnson (dialogue editor); Raymond Park Demetri Evdoxiadis (sound effects editors); Lorita de la Cerna, G.W. Pope, III (Foley artists); Nicholas Fitzgerald (music editor)	Netflix
2021	Oslo	Lewis Goldstein (supervising sound editor); Gina Alfano (supervising ADR editor); Peter John Still (sound designer); Alex Soto, Alfred DeGrand (sound effects editors); Thomas Ryan (dialogue editor); Wen Tseng (Foley editor); Leslie Bloome, Joanna Fang (Foley artists)	HBO Max
2022
2022	Prey	Will Files, Chris Terhune (supervising sound editors); James Miller (sound designer); Christopher Bonis, Diego Perez, Lee Gilmore (sound effects editors); Jessie Anne Spence (supervising dialogue editor); David Bach, Korey Pereira (dialogue editors); Nick Seaman, Roni Pillischer (Foley editors); Annie Taylor (supervising Foley editor); Leslie Bloome, Shaun Brennan (Foley artists)	Hulu
2022	Pinocchio	Randy Thom (supervising sound editor/sound designer); Bjørn O. Schroeder, Leff Lefferts (supervising sound editors); Malcolm Fife, Pascal Garneau, Teresa Eckton, Goeun Everett (sound effects editors); James Spencer (dialogue editor); Chris Frazier, Dee Shelby (Foley editors); Christopher Manning (supervising Foley editor); John Roesch, Shelley Roden (Foley artists)	Disney+
2022	Weird: The Al Yankovic Story	Anthony Vanchure (supervising sound editor); Mike James Gallagher (sound designer); Sanaa Kelley, Iris Dutour, Luke Kelley (Foley artists)	The Roku Channel
2022	Women of the Movement	Bobbi Banks (supervising sound editor); Nancy MacCleod (sound effects editor); Fred Stahly (dialogue editor); Sanaa Kelly (Foley artist)	ABC
