= Mariann Aalda =

American actress, performance artist, and stand-up comic

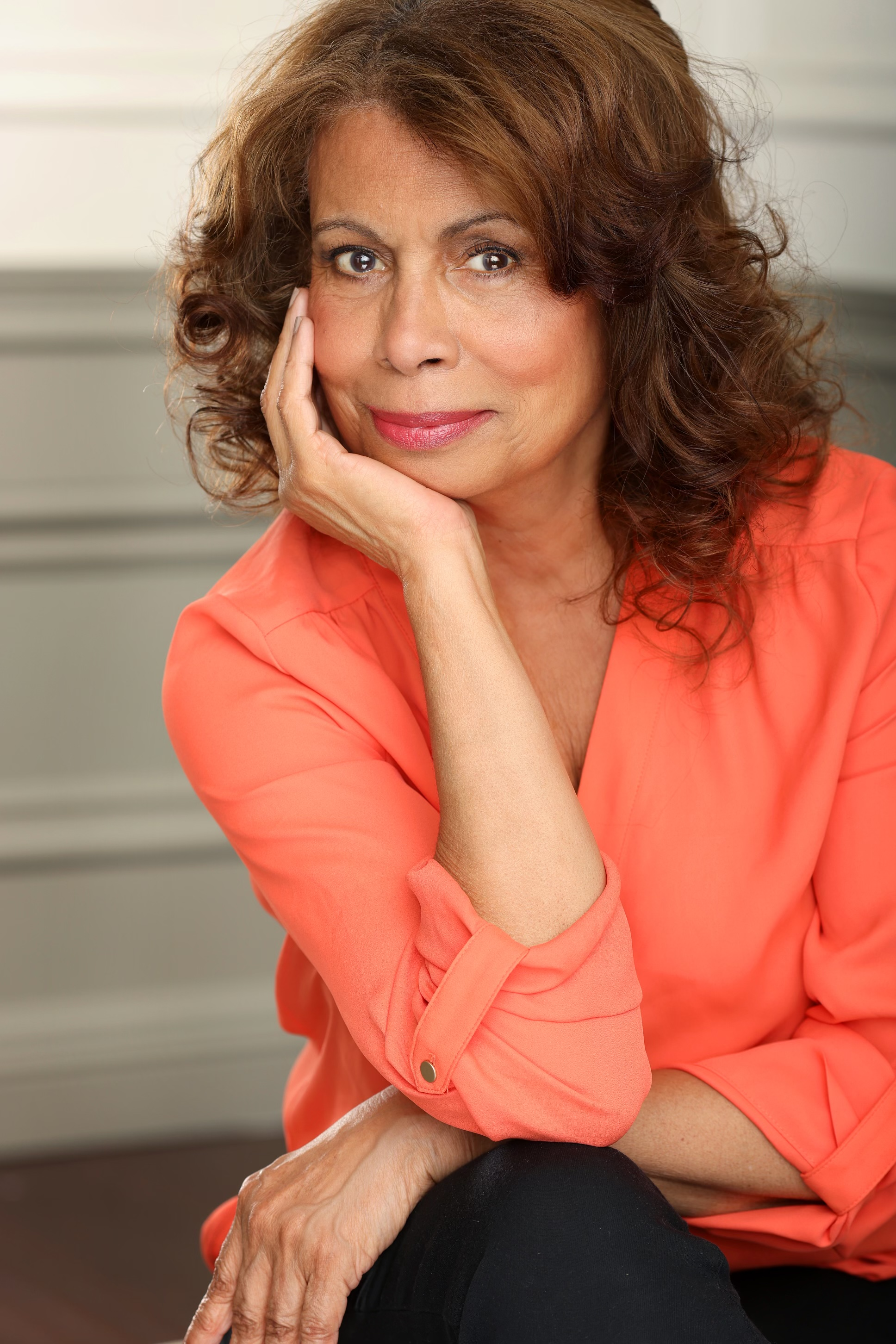
- Born: 1948 or 1949 (age 77–78)
- Occupations: Actress; comedian
- Years active: 1978–present

Mariann Aalda (born 1948 or 1949) is an American television, stage, film actress, performance artist, and stand-up comic.

== Career ==
Aalda is best known for her work in television as one of the first African-American daytime soap opera heroines, playing DiDi Bannister-Stoner on ABC's The Edge of Night from 1981 until the show's cancellation in 1984. For many years before that she was a writer-performer with the sketch comedy troupe Off Center Theatre in New York, and toured with the Boston-based improv group, The Proposition, along with notable animation voice actor and director, Charlie Adler. Later, she appeared on the CBS show Guiding Light. She also had regular roles on the CBS sitcom The Royal Family, as the daughter of Redd Foxx and Della Reese, and the HBO series 1st & Ten, as the wife of O. J. Simpson's character.

Aalda also achieved notoriety recurring on the CBS sitcom Designing Women, as Anthony's yuppie-from-hell girlfriend, Lita Ford, and on the NBC soap opera Sunset Beach as the tragically disfigured Lena Hart. She co-hosted the lifestyle show Designs for Living on the USA Network and was a reporter for the magazine show NOW! on WNBC in New York. Her numerous guest-star roles are mostly sitcoms.

Aalda has also appeared in movies, co-starring in the urban cult film Class Act as rapper Kid's clueless mom, and as Coach Harrison in Nobody's Perfect. She was a featured player in Beaches and Pretty Woman, directed by Garry Marshall and The Wiz, directed by Sidney Lumet.

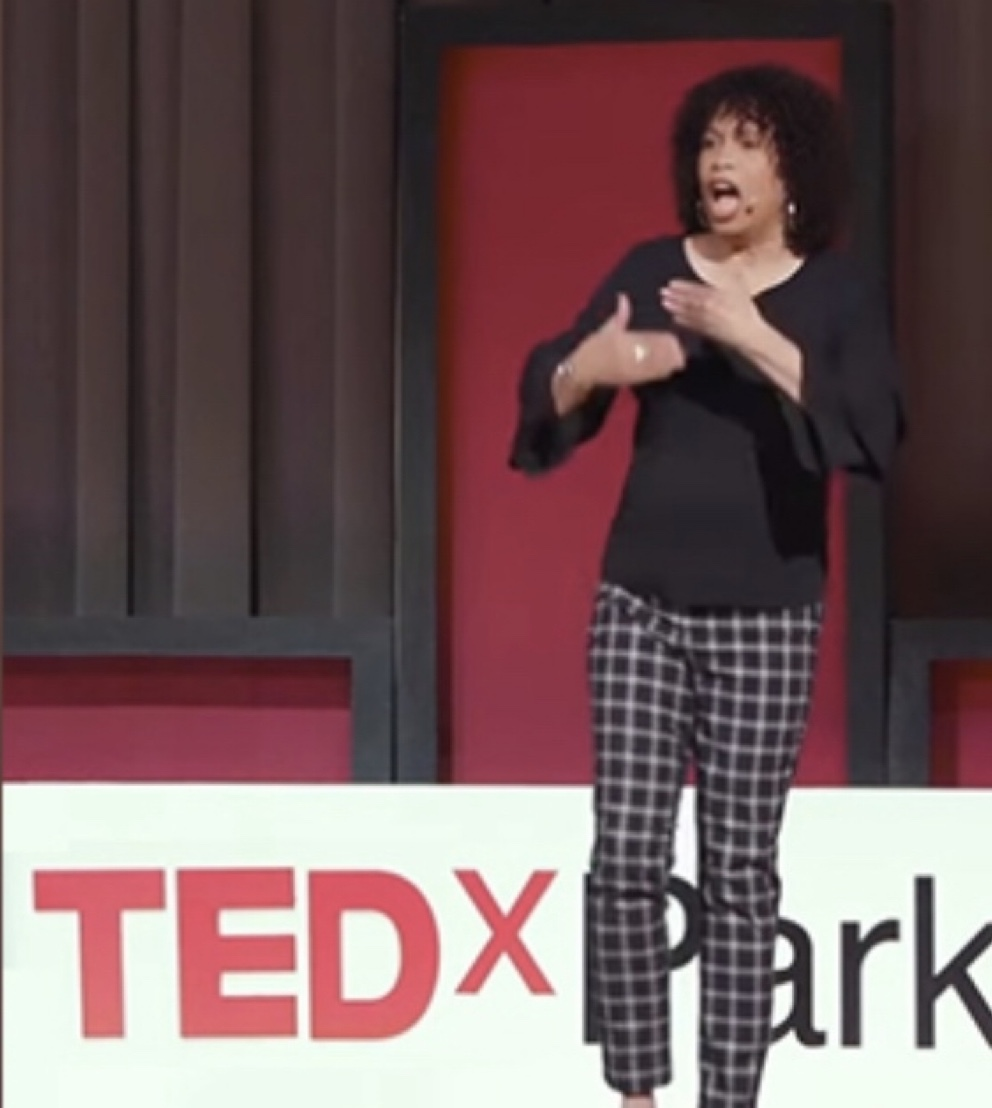
Mariann Aalda shows how to stand up to ageism in TEDx talk.

She is active in the positive ageing movement, with a TEDx Talk and AARP recognition as an "Age Disruptor". She is a regular podcast guest on the topic of 'shameless ageing' and is resident Age Anarchist for Women of Color Unite (WOCU), a 5000-plus member advocacy group for women of color working both above and below the line in the entertainment industry. She discussed positive ageing as a stand-up comedian and with her solo "existential comedy" show, Getting Old Is a Bitch...But I'm Gonna Wrestle That Bitch to the Ground!, which broke a 30-year box office record at the 2019 National Black Theatre Festival in Winston-Salem, North Carolina.

== Film and television credits ==
Film
Year	Title	Role	Notes
1978	The Wiz	Guest at Aunt Emma's Party	
1988	Beaches	Ticket Seller	Alternative title: Forever Friends
1989	Nobody's Perfect	Coach Harrison	
1990	Pretty Woman	Saleswoman	
1992	Class Act	Duncan's Mom	

Television
Year	Title	Role	Notes
1981–1984	The Edge of Night	Didi Bannister Stoner	Unknown episodes
1985	What's Happening Now!!	Theresa	1 episode
1986	The Last Precinct	Angela Beauchamp	1 episode
1986–1987	1st & Ten	Ellen	Unknown episodes
1988	Hooperman		1 episode
1989	Designing Women	Lita Ford	Episode: "The Girlfriend"
1990–1991	Guiding Light	Grace Battles	Unknown episodes
1991–1992	The Royal Family	Elizabeth Royal Winston	15 episodes
1994	Models Inc.	Janet Johnson	1 episode
1995	Family Matters	Lois	Episode: "Midterm Crisis"
1995	The O. J. Simpson Story	Eunice Simpson	Television movie
1996	Grace Under Fire	Student	1 episode
1998	The Wayans Bros.	Casting director	Episode: "Help a Brother Out"
1998	Chicago Hope	Woman	Episode: "The Other Cheek"
1999	Sunset Beach	Lena Hart	13 episodes
2000	Veronica's Closet	Brian's Mother	Episode: "Veronica Checks Out"
2003	The Parkers	Hanna Foster	Episode: "Join the Club"
2006	All of Us	Muriel	Episode: "He's Gotta Have It"
