= The O. J. Simpson Story =

American drama TV movie

- Genre: Biography; Sport
- Written by: Stephen Harrigan
- Directed by: Jerrold Freedman
- Starring: Bobby Hosea; Jessica Tuck; David Roberson; James Handy; Kimberly Russell; Harvey Jason
- Composer: Harald Kloser
- Country of origin: United States
- Original language: English

Production
- Executive producer: Robert Lovenheim
- Producer: Bob Lemchen
- Cinematography: Jeffrey Jur
- Editor: Kimberley Bennett
- Running time: 90 minutes
- Production companies: 20th Century Fox Television; National Studios Inc.

Original release
- Network: Fox
- Release: January 31, 1995

The O. J. Simpson Story is a 1995 American drama film directed by Jerrold Freedman and written by Stephen Harrigan. It stars Bobby Hosea, Jessica Tuck, David Roberson, James Handy, Kimberly Russell and Harvey Jason. It premiered on Fox on January 31, 1995.

== Plot ==
O. J. Simpson's ex-wife Nicole Brown is found murdered along with her friend Ron Goldman, outside Brown's Brentwood townhouse. Simpson is brought to the police station as a suspect. As he struggles with police interrogation and the focus of the media, Simpson's life unfolds via flashbacks, from his first meeting with Brown in 1977, to growing up in San Francisco in the 1960s, to Simpson's and Brown's romance and marriage in 1985. The pair gradually descend into domestic squabbles over Simpson's selfish and controlling behavior, with Brown suffering depression and drug use. Aspects of Simpson’s life are shown, 1964, 1970, 1975, 1979, 1985 and 1989.

Charged with the murders, Simpson panics and flees with his friend A. C. Cowlings, finding himself flashing back to a childhood meeting with baseball great Willie Mays. The Bronco chase is filmed by media. Simpson ultimately turns himself in, as his life of his prime flashes before his eyes; his friends, children, fame, and Brown.

== Cast ==
- Bobby Hosea as O. J. Simpson
- Bumper Robinson as Young O. J. Simpson
- Jessica Tuck as Nicole Brown Simpson
- David Roberson as A. C. Cowlings
- James Handy as Det. Vannatter
- Kimberly Russell as Marguerite
- Harvey Jason as Howard Weitzman
- Bruce Weitz as Robert Shapiro
- Mariann Aalda as Eunice Simpson
- John Cann as Freeway Chris
- Noel Conlon as Nicole's Father
- Richard Fancy as Ed Ledbetter
- Jonathan R. Hoog as Justin
- Terrence Howard as Young A. C.
- Eugene Lee as Willie Mays
- Jarrett Lennon as Kevin
- Barry Livingston as Dr. Berney
- Henry Marshall as Dan
- Toy Newkirk as Young Marguerite
- Toni Sawyer as Nicole's Mother
- Roger Guenveur Smith as Professor Ford
- Jill Stokesberry as Freeway Kathy
- Jonathon Steele as Kato Kaelin
- Paul Witten as Ron Goldman
- Nastassia Yalley as Sydney
- Brian Ann Zoccola as Kevin's Mother
- Steve Akahoshi as Detective

== Production ==
The film was reported conceived while the infamous Bronco chase was taking place. Simpson was portrayed by Bobby Hosea, who was advised by fellow black actors not to take the part but ignored them, keen to portray Simpson, who was an influence on his life, in a non-judgmental fashion.

Conceived by Rupert Murdoch who saw the biopic as a promotional platform for NFL telecasts, the movie was originally scheduled to air the week before Simpson’s trial began. However, after Shapiro raised concerns about the jury pool being tainted, the FOX network agreed to delay the telecast until after the trial had started. It eventually aired on January 31, 1995, one week after the trial began.

== Reception ==
The film was successful upon release, though there was criticism that the film was capitalising on the forthcoming murder trial. The site The Biopic Story gave a one-star review of the biopic:

Conceived by Rupert Murdoch who saw the biopic as a promotional platform for NFL telecasts, the movie was originally scheduled to air the week before O.J. Simpson’s trial began. However, after Shapiro raised concerns about the jury pool being tainted, the FOX network agreed to delay the telecast until after the trial had started. It eventually aired on January 31st 1995, one week after the trial began…the film gives the impression the abuse that occurred on the morning of New Year’s Day 1989 was preceded by an argument over O.J. Simpson’s upcoming role in “The Naked Gun”, whereas the movie opened the month beforehand. The scene that shows O.J. beating Nicole on New Year’s Day was originally much more violent than the final version that aired...

“[The police report] included details of punching her, hitting her on the kitchen floor, kicking her in the ribs… and when we shot that scene, I was standing there along with two other researchers making sure that everything was done exactly as reported.” Robert Lovenheim (executive producer)

Bobby Hosea said in an interview that he felt his portrayal of Simpson ruined his career, stating that nobody wanted to hire him after. The 2022 book Women in True Crime Media praised Tuck's performance as Brown as well as the portrayal of Brown as a human being. Hosea reacted to Simpson's death in 2024 with "a mix of emotions and balances".

== See also ==
- American Tragedy
- The People v. O. J. Simpson: American Crime Story
- O.J.: Made in America
