= The Boys in Company C =

1978 film directed by Sidney J. Furie

- Theatrical release poster
- Directed by: Sidney J. Furie
- Written by: Sidney J. Furie; Rick Natkin
- Produced by: Andre Morgan
- Starring: Stan Shaw; Andrew Stevens; Michael Lembeck; Craig Wasson; Scott Hylands; James Whitmore Jr.; Noble Willingham
- Cinematography: Godfrey A. Godar
- Edited by: Frank J. Urioste
- Music by: Jaime Mendoza-Nava
- Production companies: Golden Harvest; Good Times Films S.A.
- Distributed by: Columbia Pictures
- Release date: February 2, 1978
- Running time: 125 minutes
- Countries: United States; Hong Kong
- Language: English
- Budget: $1.6 million

The Boys in Company C is a 1978 war film directed by Sidney J. Furie about United States Marine Corps recruits preparing for duty and their subsequent combat in the Vietnam War. It stars Stan Shaw, Andrew Stevens, Craig Wasson and Michael Lembeck. It was among the first Vietnam War films to appear after the Vietnam Era, and was also the first role for R. Lee Ermey of Full Metal Jacket fame. It is the first in Furie's Vietnam War motion-picture trilogy, followed by Under Heavy Fire (2001) and The Veteran (2006).

The film was a co-production of Golden Harvest and Columbia Pictures, the latter originally handling theatrical distribution. It was filmed in the Philippines.

Wasson plays guitar and sings the theme song "Here I Am", used within the film and over the end credits.

== Plot ==
In August 1967, a group of young men arrive for recruit training at Marine Corps Recruit Depot San Diego. They include a draft-dodging hippie from Washington state, Dave Bisbee, who is delivered in handcuffs by FBI agents; a hardened drug-dealer, Tyrone Washington, from Chicago, Illinois; the naive and unassuming Billy Ray Pike from Galveston, Texas, who leaves behind a pregnant girlfriend; a streetwise ladies' man, Vinnie Fazio, from Brooklyn, New York; and a mild-mannered aspiring writer, Alvin Foster from Emporia, Kansas, who is writing a journal detailing his experiences.

The five young men find Marine Corps training dehumanizing and brutal. Sergeant Loyce and Staff Sergeant Aquilla use extreme physical training, brute force, and their own combat experience to teach the recruits. Foster befriends Fazio after he rescues Foster's journal which had been declared contraband. Foster hopes his journal will get him posted to a combat correspondent position. Washington's leadership skills flourish and he is assigned to serve as platoon guide.

After recruit training, the five are then assigned to the same Fleet Marine Force unit. They arrive in Vietnam by transport ship and met with a bombardment from Viet Cong mortars. Vietnam reveals itself to them as a bewildering chaos of bureaucratic incompetence, callous officers obsessed by monthly body counts, and the constant threat of death. The officers in Company C endanger the lives of their men through blind adherence to rules or timetables and their nervous Marines open fire at the slightest provocation. The Marines' first firefight occurs while taking "vital supplies" to an army outpost. Those supplies turn out to be crates of cigarettes, liquor, food, and furniture being sent to a general for his birthday. Bisbee, enraged that two men were killed delivering these luxuries, uses a claymore to blow up the general's quarters.

Washington plans with an unscrupulous South Vietnamese officer to smuggle heroin out of Vietnam in body bags. Pike, taking Demerol for pain relief, gets hooked on hard drugs and has a near-fatal overdose. Washington saves his life and abandons his drug-smuggling plans. Pike repays Washington by helping him escape a booby-trapped paddy field.

In January 1968, Company C is ordered to throw (lose) a soccer game against a team of South Vietnamese to bolster the morale of their ally. The company commander promises no more combat if they agree, but if they win, they'll go to fight at Khe Sanh. The Americans play to win and the game ends with a Viet Cong attack. The pacifistic Bisbee snaps and opens fire on the VC, to be killed by return fire. Foster throws himself on a grenade to save some children. Fazio weeps over Foster's death.

The film concludes with the final entry in Foster's journal, written moments before his death,

I don't know why I should even bother to write in this journal anymore. Because after what happened today, who the hell is ever going to believe it? We actually had a chance to get out of this goddamn war. All we had to do was throw the game and walk away. But for some reason, we just couldn't. For some reason, winning that stupid game was more important than saving our ass. So I guess we'll just keep on walking into one bloody mess after another, until somebody finally figures out that living has got to be more important than winning.

The fates of the principal characters are revealed at the end of the film. Washington was killed in action and posthumously awarded the Navy Cross. Fazio was consigned to the Veterans Administration hospital in Los Angeles with life altering injuries. Pike deserted from the Da Nang hospital, returned to the U.S., and moved to Canada, where he lived with a wife and son.

== Cast ==
- Stan Shaw as Tyrone Washington
- Andrew Stevens as Billy Ray Pike
- James Canning as Alvin Foster
- Michael Lembeck as Vinnie Fazio
- Craig Wasson as Dave Bisbee
- Scott Hylands as Captain Collins
- James Whitmore, Jr. as Lieutenant Archer
- Noble Willingham as Gunnery Sergeant Curry
- Santos Morales as Staff Sergeant Aquilla
- Lee Ermey as Staff Sergeant Loyce, junior drill instructor, later promoted to staff sergeant, succeeding Aquilla as senior drill instructor.
- Vic Diaz as Colonel Trang

== Reception ==
Roger Ebert gave the film 4/4 stars, writing "the movie is, first and best, a thrilling entertainment that starts by being funny and ends by being very deeply moving." On Rotten Tomatoes, the "Popcornometer" was rated at 77%.

== Nominations ==
Andrew Stevens was nominated for the Golden Globe for Best Motion Picture Acting Debut – Male (1979).

== Home media ==
This film has been issued numerous times on video since its theatrical release, first in-house via Columbia Pictures, and later through other companies as certain ancillary rights changed hands (it ended up becoming part of the library of ITC Entertainment). Today, the major rights are held by independent film company Fortune Star Media, which also now holds the film's copyright, with distribution by Hen's Tooth under license.

VHS and DVD versions of the film generally lack the closing epilogue revealing the fates of Washington, Fazio, and Pike.
