= Ghost Dad =

1990 American fantasy comedy film

- Theatrical release poster
- Directed by: Sidney Poitier
- Screenplay by: Brent Maddock; S. S. Wilson; Chris Reese
- Story by: Brent Maddock; S. S. Wilson
- Produced by: Terrence Nelson
- Starring: Bill Cosby; Kimberly Russell; Denise Nicholas; Ian Bannen
- Cinematography: Andrew Laszlo
- Edited by: Pembroke J. Herring
- Music by: Henry Mancini
- Production company: SAH Enterprises
- Distributed by: Universal Pictures
- Release date: June 29, 1990
- Running time: 84 minutes
- Country: United States
- Language: English
- Budget: $30 million
- Box office: $25.4 million

Ghost Dad is a 1990 American fantasy comedy film directed by Sidney Poitier (in his final directorial effort) and starring Bill Cosby, in which a widower's spirit is able to communicate with his children after his death. The film was released on June 29, 1990. Though the film was nominated for three Young Artist Awards, it was panned by critics and grossed just $25 million against its $30 million budget. This was Cosby's final leading role in a feature film.

== Plot ==
Elliot Hopper is a workaholic widower who is about to land the deal of a lifetime at work, which he hopes will win him a promotion and a company car. After he forgets his daughter Diane's birthday, he attempts to make it up to her by promising her she can have his car when he secures the deal at work on the coming Thursday. After being persuaded to give the car to his daughter early, Elliot must hail a taxi from work, which is driven by Satanist Curtis Burch, who drives erratically and is out of control. Attempting to get the taxi stopped, Elliot announces that he is Satan and commands him to stop the taxi, and also attempts to give him his wallet. Shocked to see his "Evil Master", Burch drives off a bridge and into the river.

Elliot emerges from the accident scene, only to learn that he is a ghost when a police officer fails to notice him and a speeding bus goes straight through him. When he gets home he discovers that his three children can see him, but only in a totally dark room, and they cannot hear him at times. He struggles to tell them what happened when he is whisked away to London by paranormal researcher Sir Edith Moser, who tells him he is a ghost who has yet to enter the afterlife because "they screwed up"; his soul will not cross over until Thursday.

The pressures of work and family life lead to many comedic events, as Elliot attempts to renew his life insurance policy and complete his company's merger, so his family will be provided for once he crosses over. He is forced to choose between staying in an important work meeting and helping his son Danny with a magic trick at school. He eventually decides that his family's happiness is more important and walks out on his furious boss, Mr. Collins, who later smugly fires him. Dejected, Elliot reveals himself as a ghost to his love interest, Joan, whose initial shock soon turns to sympathy.

Edith arrives from London to announce that Elliot is not dead; his spirit jumped out of his body in fright. They also work out that the only previous known case of this happening was Elliot's father. In the excitement to find Elliot's body to reunite his spirit with it, Diane trips on a pair of skates that her little sister, Amanda, left on the stairs; she falls and is seriously injured. The family rush her to the hospital where her spirit has also jumped out of her body. As she delightedly flies around, Elliot begs her to re-enter her body; his own has started to "flicker". When he collapses, Diane becomes concerned and races into the intensive-care unit to find her father's body. She helps him into the room and they discover that Burch had swapped wallets with Elliot, meaning Elliot was wrongly identified by the hospital as Burch. Elliot returns to his body and wakes up; Diane does the same and jumps off the operating table to tell the family what has happened.

As the reunited family leave the hospital, Elliot spots a yellow taxi parked outside and goes to look inside. He sees Curtis Burch behind the wheel. Delighted to see his "Evil Master", Burch returns Elliot's wallet and tells Elliot he will do whatever Elliot commands. Elliot commands Burch to go to hell and sit on red-hot coals waiting for him "until it snows". Burch agrees enthusiastically and drives off while Elliot, Joan, Edith, and the family leave the hospital.

== Cast ==
- Bill Cosby as Elliot Hopper
- Kimberly Russell as Diane Hopper
- Denise Nicholas as Joan
- Salim Grant as Danny Hopper
- Brooke Fontaine as Amanda Hopper
- Ian Bannen as Sir Edith Moser
- Christine Ebersole as Carol
- Barry Corbin as Mr. Emery Collins
- Dana Ashbrook as Tony Ricker
- Omar Gooding as Stuart
- Arnold Stang as Mr. Cohen
- Dakin Matthews as Mr. Seymour
- Raynor Scheine as Curtis Burch
- Brian Stokes Mitchell as Teacher

== Pre-production ==
Early in development, John Badham was slated to direct the film with Steve Martin as Elliot Hopper. Badham and Martin left the project for unknown reasons, and Universal hired Sidney Poitier and Bill Cosby to be their respective replacements.

== Novelization ==
Ghost Dad
- Author: Mel Cebulash
- Language: English
- Genre: Comedy
- Publisher: Berkley; Mv Tie in edition
- Publication date: July 1, 1990
- Publication place: United States
- Media type: Print (paperback)
- ISBN: 978-0-425-12453-6
- OCLC: 21994170

As part of the publicity for the movie, a Ghost Dad novelization written by Mel Cebulash was released the year of the film's debut.

== Reception ==
=== Critical response ===
On review aggregator Rotten Tomatoes, the film holds an approval rating of 6% based on 31 reviews, with an average rating of 3.30/10. The site's critics consensus states: "A startlingly misconceived effort from director Sidney Poitier and star Bill Cosby, Ghost Dad is a listless, glacially-paced comedy that's alternately schmaltzy and incomprehensible." Audiences polled by CinemaScore gave the film an average grade of "A−" on an A+ to F scale.

Rating the movie half a star out of four, Chicago Sun-Times film critic Roger Ebert characterized it as "a desperately unfunny film—a strained, contrived construction that left me shaking my head in amazement [ . . . ] How could Sidney Poitier, a skilled filmmaker with an actor's sense of timing, have been the director of this mess? How did a production executive go for it? Who ever thought this was a good idea? Ebert's colleague Gene Siskel said that Ghost Dad was "dead from the first frame" and expressed bewilderment in the direction of Cosby's film career, saying, "Leonard Part 6 and then this? I mean, these are shockingly bad films." Vincent Canby of The New York Times called it "unctuous, flat and phony, a farce that has the pace of a Broadway bus at rush hour."

=== Box office ===
In the film's opening weekend, it earned $4,803,480. Domestically the film earned $24,707,633 and $714,000 at the international box office for a total of $25,421,633.

== Home media ==
Ghost Dad was released on VHS by MCA/Universal Home Video on December 6, 1990. The film was released on DVD by GoodTimes Video on February 15, 2000, originally in a snap case, then May 1, 2001 as a reprint in a keep case, and as a "Studio Selections" DVD by Universal Studios on March 1, 2005.

== TV version ==
12 minutes' worth of deleted scenes were shown on television on NBC and on USA Network.

== See also ==
- List of American films of 1990
- List of ghost films
