= The Veteran (2006 film) =

- Screenplay by: John Flock; J. Stephen Maunder (wrriten by)
- Directed by: Sidney J. Furie
- Starring: Ally Sheedy; Bobby Hosea; Michael Ironside; Casper Van Dien; Colin Glazer; Sean Baek; Jim Codrington; Donald Burda
- Music by: Eric Cadesky; Nick Dyer
- Countries of origin: Canada; United States
- Original language: English

Production
- Producer: Curtis Petersen
- Cinematography: David Mitchell; Curtis Petersen
- Editors: Eduardo Martinez; Mitchell Lackie
- Running time: 90 mins
- Production companies: Alliance Atlantis; Peace Arch Entertainment Group

Original release
- Release: 2006

Related
- Under Heavy Fire

The Veteran is a 2006 American made-for-TV war film directed by Sidney J. Furie and starring Ally Sheedy, Bobby Hosea, Michael Ironside, Casper Van Dien, Colin Glazer, Sean Baek, Jim Codrington and Donald Burda. It is a follow-up to Under Heavy Fire.

The film is the third in Sidney J. Furie's Vietnam War trilogy along with 1977's The Boys in Company C and 2001's Under Heavy Fire, resembling Oliver Stone and his Vietnam War trilogy of 1986's Platoon, 1989's Born on the Fourth of July and 1993's Heaven & Earth.

== Synopsis ==
30 years since the Fall of Saigon, Ray Watson (played by Bobby Hosea from Under Heavy Fire), a Vietnam War veteran now working as a state senator, returns to Vietnam once again. When he arrives at his hotel room, he gets an unexpected visit from another veteran (played by Michael Ironside), who claims to be one of Ray's old comrades from Echo Company. Ray doesn't remember him, so he starts to remind him about the time that they served together. Meanwhile, Sara Reid (played by Ally Sheedy) from the Vietnam Veterans Action Committee in Washington, DC, along with a few government agents, are in the hotel opposite secretly listening in to the conversation between the two veterans as they are assigned to search for a missing soldier.

The character played by Michael Ironside is Doc Jordan, from the original film, Under Heavy Fire. The scenes taken from that film and used in The Veteran as a background color for the story star Austin Farwell as the young Doc Jordan, who went missing in the battle of Hue in Under Heavy Fire. Austin Farwell is not acknowledged in the credits of The Veteran although the central character is based upon his original portrayal of Doc Jordan.

== Cast ==
- Ally Sheedy as Sara Reid
- Bobby Hosea as Raymond Watson
- Michael Ironside as Mark Jordan
- Colin Glazer as Dennis McBride
- Sean Baek as CIA Agent Huang
- Jim Codrington as Agent Cooper
- Donald Burda as Agent McDonald
