= The Royal Family (TV series) =

American sitcom (1991–1992)

- Redd Foxx and Della Reese, stars of The Royal Family
- Also known as: Chest Pains
- Genre: Sitcom
- Created by: Eddie Murphy
- Developed by: Greg Antonacci
- Written by: Greg Antonacci; Mark E. Corry; Rob Dames; David Garber; Mark McClafferty; Mike Milligan; Jay Moriarty; Eddie Murphy; Leonard Ripps; B. Mark Seabrooks; Clint Smith
- Directed by: Shelley Jensen; Jack Shea
- Starring: Redd Foxx; Della Reese; Mariann Aalda; Sylver Gregory; Larenz Tate; Naya Rivera; Jackée Harry; Barry Shabaka Henley
- Theme music composer: David Allen Jones
- Composer: Dan Foliart
- Country of origin: United States
- Original language: English
- No. of seasons: 1
- No. of episodes: 15 (2 unaired)

Production
- Executive producers: Eddie Murphy; Mark McClafferty; Greg Antonacci; Redd Foxx
- Producers: David Garber; Shelley Jensen; Deborah Leschin; Leslie Ray; David Steven Simon; Della Reese
- Cinematography: Mikel Neiers
- Editor: Richard Russel
- Camera setup: Multi-camera
- Running time: 22–24 minutes
- Production companies: Eddie Murphy Television; Paramount Television

Original release
- Network: CBS
- Release: September 18, 1991 – May 13, 1992

The Royal Family is an American sitcom television series that ran on CBS between September 18, 1991, and May 13, 1992. The series was created by executive producer Eddie Murphy, as part of a development deal Murphy had with CBS, and produced by David Garber, Shelley Jensen, Deborah Leschin, Leslie Ray, and David Steven Simon. Other executive producers alongside Eddie Murphy are Mark McClafferty and Greg Antonacci. It was presented by Eddie Murphy Television in association with Paramount Television, the television arm of Paramount Pictures, a Paramount Communications Company, with which Murphy had long been associated. The series starred Redd Foxx and Della Reese.

Murphy had previously worked with Foxx and Reese in the 1989 film Harlem Nights, which Murphy wrote and directed. The working title for the series was Chest Pains.

== Premise ==
The series chronicled the lives of Atlanta mail carrier Alexander Alphonso "Al" Royal (Redd Foxx) and his wife Victoria (Della Reese), who were anticipating peaceful retirement years until marital problems brought an extended visit from their daughter Elizabeth (Mariann Aalda) and her three children: Kim (Sylver Gregory), Curtis (Larenz Tate), and Hillary (Naya Rivera).

== Redd Foxx's death and aftermath ==
The Royal Family was intended as a comeback vehicle for Foxx, who had not had a successful television series since the cancellation of Sanford and Son in 1977. Ratings for the early episodes were high. However, the show suffered an enormous blow when, on October 11, 1991, Foxx suffered a massive heart attack while rehearsing. Joshua Rich of Entertainment Weekly later wrote, "It was an end so ironic that for a brief moment cast mates figured Foxx—whose 1970s TV character often faked heart attacks—was kidding when he grabbed a chair and fell to the floor." Foxx was taken to Queen of Angels Hollywood Presbyterian Medical Center, where he died that evening.

The show's producers eventually decided to resume work on the series, running commercials in Foxx's memory that included the line "Like any family, The Royal Family will go on." Jackée Harry was added to the cast as Victoria's younger sister Ruth, who moved in to help the family cope with Al's sudden death. She was introduced in the series' eighth episode, which was written to deal with Al Royal's death. After that episode, The Royal Family was placed on hiatus so the writers could rework the series.

When the show returned in April 1992, Harry's role had been reworked; instead of Victoria's sister, she was now the Royals' eldest daughter, CoCo. The ratings of the revived Royal Family did not match those of episodes featuring Foxx, and CBS cancelled the series a week before the broadcast of its first season was scheduled to end, leaving two episodes unaired. In 2019, the Decades (now Catchy Comedy) network broadcast all fifteen episodes of the series, including the last two unaired episodes.

== Cast ==
- Redd Foxx as Alexander Alphonso Royal
- Della Reese as Victoria Royal
- Mariann Aalda as Elizabeth Royal Winston
- Sylver Gregory as Kim Winston
- Larenz Tate as Curtis Winston
- Naya Rivera as Hillary Winston
- Jackée Harry as Ruth "CoCo" Royal
- Barry Shabaka Henley as Willis Tillis

== Episodes ==
| No. | Title | Directed by | Written by | Original release date | Viewers (millions) |
|---|---|---|---|---|---|
| 1 | "Pilot" | Shelley Jensen | Greg Antonacci, Eddie Murphy | September 18, 1991 | 19.7 |
Atlanta mail carrier Al Royal and his wife Victoria are anticipating peaceful retirement years until their daughter moves in with her children. In the opener, 15-year-old Curtis borrows Al's truck.
| 2 | "Homework Bound" | Shelley Jensen | Mark E. Corry, Mark McClafferty, Clint Smith | September 25, 1991 | 18.5 |
Under Al's history tutelage at the bowling alley, Curtis scores an A on a test, but not without having something up his sleeve.
| 3 | "Me and My Stuff" | Greg Antonacci | Mike Milligan, Jay Moriarty | October 2, 1991 | 14.7 |
Curtis opts to secede from the manor when Al denies his request for his own room.
| 4 | "Talkin' Baseball" | Shelley Jensen | Greg Antonacci | October 9, 1991 | 12.9 |
Kim's success playing baseball against Curtis and a friend inspires her to try out for the varsity team, starting a squabble with Al about a woman's place in a man's game.
| 5 | "A Mid-Summer Night's Barbecue" | Jack Shea | Lisa A. Bannick | October 30, 1991 | 14.4 |
The first show that aired after Redd Foxx's death. It started with a tribute to Foxx by Della Reese.
| 6 | "What's Love Got to Do with It?" | Neema Barnette | Leslie Ray, David Steven Simon | November 13, 1991 | 11.2 |
The budding relationship between Elizabeth and a doctor thrills Al, but Victoria has doubts.
| 7 | "Educating Al" | Shelley Jensen | David Garber | November 20, 1991 | 11.8 |
The final episode that Redd Foxx taped before his death. Elizabeth tries to find a preschool for Hillary.
| 8 | "New Beginnings" | Jack Shea | Rob Dames, Leonard Ripps | November 27, 1991 | 13.1 |
(including Sanford & Son alumni, Don Bexley & Slappy White).
| 9 | "The Sneakin' Deacon" | Jack Shea | Rob Dames, Leonard Ripps | April 8, 1992 | 11.7 |
Victoria sees a match with Elizabeth and the new church deacon, but the deacon makes a play for Ruth, who doesn't like his game plan.
| 10 | "Status, Bro" | Gerren Keith | Fred Johnson | April 15, 1992 | 10.4 |
Ruth regrets being cool to Willis, while Curtis receives a discount version of an expensive jacket.
| 11 | "Hello, I Must Be Going" | Jack Shea | David Garber, Michael Poryes | April 22, 1992 | 10.4 |
Ruth takes off after Victoria takes her to task for being a poor influence on Kim and Curtis.
| 12 | "The Fame Game" | Shelley Jensen | David Garber, | May 6, 1992 | 10.4 |
Curtis gets a swelled head after being chosen to appear with Doctor Dré and Ed Lover of Yo! MTV Raps.
| 13 | "Mo' Money" | Shelley Jensen | Mark E. Corry, Mark McClafferty, Clint Smith | May 13, 1992 | 9.2 |
Curtis finds his part-time job taxing in more ways than one.
| 14 | "CoCo in Charge" | Jack Shea | Brian Scully, Mike Scully | Unaired | N/A |
Against their better judgment, Victoria and Elizabeth allow Ruth to watch the kids for the weekend.
| 15 | "The Big Stink" | Rob Dames | Mike Milligan, Jay Moriarty | Unaired | N/A |
Trouble arises when Ruth hires Victoria for the Perfume counter.

== Awards and nominations ==
| Year | Award | Category | Recipient | Result |
|---|---|---|---|---|
| 1992 | Young Artist Awards | Exceptional Performance by a Young Actress Under Ten | Naya Rivera | Nominated |
| 1992 | Young Artist Awards | Best Young Actor Starring in a New Television Series | Larenz Tate | Nominated |
| 1992 | Young Artist Awards | Best Young Actress Starring in a New Television Series | Sylver Gregory | Nominated |
