= Kimberly Russell =

American actress (born 1970)

- Born: Brooklyn, New York, U.S.
- Occupation: actress
- Years active: 1979–present
- Spouse(s): Michael Bonewitz, 2000–present

Kimberly Russell is an American actress best known for her role as Sarah Nevins on the 1986–1991 sitcom Head of the Class and in the 1990 comedy film Ghost Dad alongside Bill Cosby.

== Early life ==
Russell was born in Brooklyn. She graduated from the New York High School of Performing Arts.

== Career ==
Russell began acting at the age of 11, making her film debut in Fame. She later appeared opposite Angela Bassett in the Off-Broadway production Black Girl.

She went on to appear in several television series, including Family Matters, New York Undercover—which also featured Michael DeLorenzo, her co-star from Fame and Head of the Class—as well as The John Larroquette Show, Ellen, ER, Strong Medicine, and The Steve Harvey Show.

Russell’s film credits include Hangin' with the Homeboys, The Game, Precious, The Sins, and The Deliverance, which starred Glenn Close and was directed by Lee Daniels.

== Filmography ==
=== Film ===
Year	Title	Role	Notes
1990	Ghost Dad	Diane Hopper	
1991	Hangin' with the Homeboys	Vanessa	
1993	Sugar Hill	Chantal	
1996	Jimi	Rose	
1997	The Game	Cynthia	
2000	Dancing in September	Shelley	
2009	Precious	Katherine	
2009	The Princess and the Frog	Party Guest	Voice
2012	Madea's Witness Protection	ADR voice	
2013	Temptation: Confessions of a Marriage Counselor	ADR voice	
2017	Rock, Paper, Scissors	Judge Foley	
2018	Blood Brother	Additional voices	
TBA	The Deliverance	Child Psychologist	
TBA	Spychosis	Priscilla	

=== Television ===
Year	Title	Role	Notes
1986–1991	Head of the Class	Sarah Nevins	114 episodes
1992	Final Shot: The Hank Gathers Story	Carole	Television film
1994	Family Matters	Darlene	Episode: "Till Death Do Us Apartment"
1994	New York Undercover	Leslie	Episode: "Mate"
1994	The John Larroquette Show	Johnnie Hemingway	Episode: "Just Like a Woman"
1995	Ellen	Tonya	Episode: "The Spa"
1995	The O. J. Simpson Story	Marguerite	Television film
1997	Prison of Secrets	Frannie	Television film
1997	Between Brothers	Maiya	Episode: "Elephant Men"
1998	ER	Karen Fern	Episode: "A Bloody Mess"
1999	The Steve Harvey Show	Naomi	Episode: "Almost Dirty Dancing"
2002	Roswell	Girlfriend #1	Episode: "A Tale of Two Parties"
2002	SpongeBob SquarePants	Party Extra	Episode: "SpongeBob's House Party (Party Pooper Pants)"
2002	Strong Medicine	Veralyn 'Vera'	Episode: "House Calls"
TBA	Duke of the Valley	Joy Taylor	Episode: "Pilot"
