= Bobby Hosea =

American film and television actor (born 1955)

Profile
- Position: Safety

Personal information
- Born: December 5, 1955 (age 70); Murfreesboro, Tennessee, U.S.
- Listed height: 6 ft 1 in (1.85 m)
- Listed weight: 183 lb (83 kg)

Career information
- High school: San Bernardino (CA) San Gorgonio
- College: UCLA
- NFL draft: 1979: undrafted

Career history

Playing
- Montreal Alouettes (1979); Saskatchewan Roughriders (1980–1981); Los Angeles Express (1983); Jacksonville Bulls (1984)

Coaching
- San Bernardino Valley (1982 – ?, ? – present) (Nickles & safeties coach)

Career CFL statistics
- Games played: 44
- Interceptions: 8

Willie "Bobby" Samuel Hosea, Jr. (born December 5, 1955) is an American film and television actor, and former professional gridiron football player. He played O. J. Simpson in the Fox movie The O. J. Simpson Story. and John Allen Muhammad in D.C. Sniper: 23 Days of Fear. He is the head of Train 'Em Up Academy, Inc., and the creator of Dip-N-rip Sticks, 12-Step Tackle Training System.

== Early life and football career ==
Hosea is of African American heritage. He played college football for San Bernardino Valley College and then UCLA. After graduating, Hosea went to Canada to play professionally the Canadian Football League where he played for one season with the Montreal Alouettes and two seasons with the Saskatchewan Roughriders; he played in the 67th Grey Cup with the Alouettes. Hosea then returned to the United States to play with the Los Angeles Express and Jacksonville Bulls in the original United States Football League.

After retiring from professional play, Hosea returned to San Bernardino Valley College to began a coaching career while also establishing his career as an actor in film and television.

== Filmography ==
=== Film ===
Year	Title	Role	Notes
1988	Jack's Back	Tom Dellerton	
1989	Rock-A-Die Baby	Corporal Hutchinson	
1990	Murder By Numbers	Richard Parris	
1991	Pretty Hattie's Baby	Charles	
1992	Why Colors ?	N/A	Short film
1993	Boiling Point	Steve	
1996	Independence Day	Commanding Officer	
1998	Judas Kiss	Rickles	
2001	All About You	Greg	
2001	Under Heavy Fire	Ray	
2006	The Dead Girl	Detective	
2011	The Truth About Angels	Frankie	
2021	Deadly Ride	Chief McHugh	

=== Television ===
Year	Title	Role	Notes
1984	Her Life As A Man	Football Player	TV movie
1985	Benson	Sheriff	Episode: "Benson the Hero"
1985-1986	Knots Landing	Reporter	2 episodes
1986	Perfect Strangers	Customer #2	Episode: "Knock Knock, Who's There?"
1986	Second Serve	First Reporter	TV movie
1986-1987	1st and Ten	Craig/Player #4	3 episodes
1987	The Twilight Zone	Stretcher Bearer	Episode: "The Card/The Junction" (segment The Junction)
1987	Angel in Green	Rhodes	TV movie
1987	Glory Years	N/A	TV movie
1987	Warm Hearts, Cold Feet	Reporter #2	TV movie
1988	West Price Victory	Coach Webster	TV movie
1988-1990	China Beach	Private Sweetness Elroy	5 episodes
1989	21 Jump Street	Marcus Rainey	Episode: "What About Love ?"
1989	227	Greg	Episode: "Jackée"
1989	CBS Summer Playhouse	Hacker	Episode: "The Heat"
1990	Mancuso, FBI	Danny King	Episode: "Conspiracy"
1990	Generations	Ted Winters	14 episode
1990	Singer and Sons	Mitchell Patterson	3 episode
1990	Coach	Terrence Moses	Episode: "The Day That Moses Came To Town"
1991-1995	Murder, She Wrote	John McCarver / Officer Kevin Bryce	2 episodes
1992	The Fresh Prince of Bel-Air	Dr. Alec Hudson	Episode: "Community Action"
1992	Hangin' with Mr. Cooper	William	Episode: "The Presentation"
1993	Sirens	Guy Stewart	Episode: "Guy Perfect"
1994	French Silk	Devaux	TV movie
1994	M.A.N.T.I.S	Yuri Barnes	TV movie
1994-1995	Living Single	Lawrence	3 episodes
1995	The O.J Simpson Story	O. J. Simpson	TV movie
1995	Diagnosis Murder	Dr. Gregory Talbott	Episode: "Playing for Keeps"
1995	Robin's Hood	Ron Hughes	2 episodes
1995	Vanishing Son	Ray	Episode: "Lock and Load, Babe"
1995-1996	Xena: Warrior Princess	Marcus	2 episodes
1996-1997	The Cape	Marine Pilot Major Reggie Warren	17 episodes
1996-1997	JAG	Lt. Col. Robert Turner / Chief Petty Officer Shipp	2 episodes
1998	Soldier of Fortune, Inc	N/A	Episode: "Hired Guns"
1998	Gargantua	Colonel Wayne	TV movie
1998	Wie stark muß eine Liebe sein	Tom McMillian	German TV movie
1998-2000	Pensacola: Wings of Gold	Hammer	44 episodes
2000	Any Day Now	Mr. Johnson	Episode: "The Dust of Life"
2001	61*	Elston Howard	TV movie
2001	18 Wheels of Justice	Jonathan Snow	12 episodes
2002	V.I.P.	Sergeant Lennox	Episode: "Saving Private Irons"
2002	Crossing Jordan	David Blake	Episode: "Scared Straight"
2003	The District	Gordon Beecham	2 episodes
2003	D.C. Sniper: 23 Days of Fear	John Allen Muhammad	TV movie
2003	Threat Matrix	Kenneth Holmes	Episode: "Alpha-126"
2003	Boomtown	Greg Haymer	Episode: "The Hole-in-the-Wall Gang"
2004	The Mountain	F. Robert Chaplain	3 episodes
2004-2008	C.S.I: Crimes Scene Investigation	Negotiator / Rich Rebba	2 episodes
2006	C.S.I: Miami	Officer Joey Brown	Episode: "The Score"
2006	Standoff	Sgt. Joe Hernandez	Pilot episode
2006	Cold Case	Terell Pierce	Episode: "Fireflies"
2006	The Veteran	Raymond Watson	TV movie
2006	Supernatural	Sarge / Mark	Episode: "Croatoan"
2007	Heroes	Detective	Episode: "Chapter Twelve: Godsend"
2007	Shark	Bartender	Episode: "Here Comes the Judge"
2007	Greek	Roger Owens	Episode: "Picking Teams"
2007	Born in the USA	N/A	TV movie
2007-2009	Lincoln Heights	Detective Franklin	6 episodes
2008	The Closer	Principal	Episode: "Time Bomb"
2008	The Young and the Restless	Burke Shay	3 episodes
2009	24	Dr. Cornell	Episode: "Day 7: 9:00 a.m.-10:00 a.m."
2010	N.C.I.S	Captain Austin Sears	Episode: "Obsession"
2010	Bones	Jerry Doroughty	Episode: "The Couple in the Cave"
2011	The Event	Hospital Soldier	Episode: "One Will Live, One Will Die"
2012	Perception	Coach Parker	Episode: "86'd"
2012	C.S.I: NY	Principal Hal Kinney	Episode: "Late Admissions"
2013	The Mentalist	Joe Lamotte	Episode: "Fire and Brimstone"
2019	What/If	N/A	2 episodes
2019	The Rookie	Walter	Episode: "Clean Cut"
2023	All Rise	Ness's Dad	Episode: "Unwanted Guest"

== Personal life ==
He has been married to Marcia Hairston from 1980 to the present.
