= Jim Codrington =

Canadian actor

Jim Codrington is a Canadian actor known for his roles in The Border, ZOS: Zone of Separation, Da Kink in My Hair, Pushing Tin, and others.

== Filmography ==
=== Film ===
Year	Title	Role	Notes
1995	Tommy Boy	Security Guard	
1998	Motel	Mick	
1999	Pushing Tin	Pilot	Voice
2000	Steal This Movie!	Soldier	
2000	The Ladies Man	Soul Station Manager	
2001	A Passage to Ottawa	Roland	
2004	Direct Action	Hardcase #2	
2004	Resident Evil: Apocalypse	Lieutenant	
2008	One Week	Pharmacist	
2008	Killshot	1st FBI Agent	
2011	The Entitled	Detective	
2015	Across the Line	Fraser Crawley	
2015	Gridlocked	Beck	
2015	Burning, Burning	The African	
2016	Prisoner X	William	
2016	Hacker	International News Anchor	Uncredited
2018	Romeo and Juliet	Lord Montague	
2018	Luba	Perly	
2022	Nightalk	Det. Charlie	

=== Television ===
Year	Title	Role	Notes
1971	Polka Dot Door	Host	1 episode
1989	Degrassi High	Musician	Episode: "Taking Off: Part 2"
1992	E.N.G.	Policeman	Episode: "Public Enemy"
1995	Deadly Love	Derek Green	Television film
1995	Side Effects	Policeman	Episode: "Feet of Clay"
1995	Liberty Street	James	13 episodes
1996	Closer and Closer	Tech. in Charge	Television film
1996	The Morrison Murders	Technician	Television film
1996	Rebound: The Legend of Earl "The Goat" Manigault	Black Cop	Television film
1997	La Femme Nikita	Det. Delray Jackson	Episode: "Voices"
1997	Color of Justice	Reporter #4	Television film
1997	The Third Twin	Kiosk Guard	Television film
1997	Ms. Scrooge	Ward	Television film
1998	White Lies	Black Cop	Television film
1998	Earth: Final Conflict	Blanchard / Col. Purcell	Episode: "The Devil You Know"
1999	Half a Dozen Babies	Internist	Television film
1999	Twice in a Lifetime	Coach Cronin	Episode: "Ashes to Ashes"
1999	Forget Me Never	Cop	Television film
1999	Thrill Seekers	Co-pilot	Television film
1999	The Last Witness	James Halsel	Television film
2000	Trapped in a Purple Haze	Police Officer	Television film
2000	Witchblade	Officer Smitty	Television film
2000	Code Name: Eternity	Captain Elliot	Episode: "Dark of Night"
2000	Deep in the City	Mick	Episode: "Swing Your Partner"
2001	Life with Judy Garland: Me and My Shadows	Doctor #2	2 episodes
2001	The Judge	Sgt. McAllister	Episode: "Part One"
2001	Walter and Henry	Cop	Television film
2001	Bleacher Bums	Decker's Employee	Television film
2001	Blue Murder	Constable Gord Wickman	Episode: "Inside Jobs"
2001–2002	Soul Food	Various roles	3 episodes
2002	Keep the Faith, Baby	John Conyers	Television film
2002	The Matthew Shepard Story	Health Food Store Manager	Television film
2002	Two Against Time	Dr. Emerick	Television film
2002	Mutant X	Halloran	Episode: "Deadly Desire"
2002–2003	Odyssey 5	Troy Johnson	12 episodes
2004	Gracie's Choice	Stan	Television film
2004	1-800-Missing	Moses Tyrell	Episode: "Pop Star"
2004	Dark Oracle	Mr. Slade	Episode: "Crushed"
2004	Kink in My Hair	Dwayne	Television film
2005	Kevin Hill	Dennis	2 episodes
2005	Queer as Folk	Bud Lockwood	2 episodes
2005	Category 7: The End of the World	FPS Capt. Tergesson	2 episodes
2005–2007	Da Vinci's City Hall	Bob Forrest	7 episodes
2006	Life with Derek	Gerry Davis	Episode: "All Systems No Go"
2006	Supernatural	Male Doctor	Episode: "Faith"
2006	Puppets Who Kill	Cop	Episode: "Joyride"
2006	Doomstown	Rev. T.J. Jenner	Television film
2006	The Dead Zone	Dwight Connors	Episode: "Panic"
2006	Blade: The Series	Detective Gibbs	Episode: "Bloodlines"
2006	The Veteran	Agent Cooper	Television film
2007	Wide Awake	Mason	Television film
2007	The Note	Reverend Timothy Lavery	Television film
2007–2009	Da Kink in My Hair	Dwayne	5 episodes
2008–2010	The Border	Darnell Williams	38 episodes
2009	ZOS: Zone of Separation	Taffy Najira	8 episodes
2009	The Listener	Defence Attorney Lynch	Episode: "My Sister's Keeper"
2010	Republic of Doyle	Dr. Jim Collins	3 episodes
2011	Combat Hospital	Col. Rudolph Arlington	Episode: "Wrong Place at the Right Time"
2011	Against the Wall	Lenny Butler	Episode: "We Have a Cop in Trouble"
2011	Flashpoint	George	Episode: "Slow Burn"
2012	Copper	Reverend Albin Garland	2 episodes
2012	The Phantoms	Norm	Television film
2012–2015	Rookie Blue	ETF Sgt. Bailey	7 episodes
2013	Air Crash Investigation	Lead Investigator	Episode: "Catastrophe at O'Hare"
2013	Murder in Paradise	Justice Smith	Episode: "Stranger Danger"
2013	Rewind	CIA Director	Television film
2014	Bomb Girls	Leon Riley / Leon Buck	9 episodes
2014	The Transporter	Zollo	Episode: "Trust"
2015	A Wish Come True	Renshaw	Television film
2015	After Birth	Paul	Television film
2016	The Girlfriend Experience	Toronto Client	Episode: "Available"
2016	Dark Matter	G.A. Sergeant	Episode: "But First, We Save the Galaxy"
2017	Haunters: The Musical	Peter	6 episodes
2018, 2019	Anne with an E	Minister Hall / Clergyman	2 episodes
2020	My Perfect Landing	Mr. Vine	3 episodes
2020	The Hardy Boys	Sam Peterson	3 episodes
2022	The Kings of Napa	Paul Richardson	2 episodes
2022	Ruby and the Well	Dr. R. Harmon	Episode: "I Wish I Got the Credit I Deserve"
