= Don Bexley =

American actor

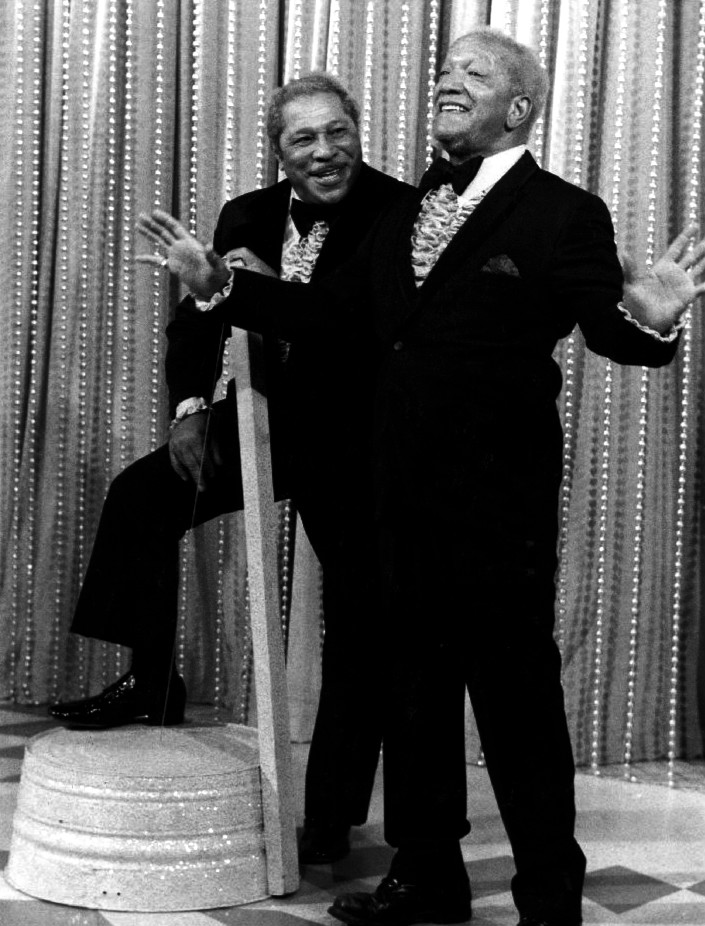
- Bexley as Bubba with Redd Foxx on Sanford and Son, 1976
- Born: March 10, 1910; Detroit, Michigan, United States or Jamestown, Virginia, United States (sources differ)
- Died: April 15, 1997 (aged 87); Hampton, Virginia, United States
- Occupations: Actor; singer; entertainer; comedian
- Years active: 1941–1991
- Known for: Bubba Bexley on the NBC-TV series Sanford & Son

Donald Thomas Bexley (March 10, 1910 – April 15, 1997) was an American actor and comedian, best known for playing Bubba Bexley on the 1970s television sitcom Sanford and Son.

== Early life ==
Bexley was born in either Jamestown, Virginia, or Detroit, Michigan, to Mr. and Mrs. Thomas Bexley. His father was a Bible scholar and teacher, and his mother a classical vocalist. "I was born with a flair for the stage, as I had always been a clown – even during early adolescence," Bexley wrote in 1983.

== Career ==
In his career, Don Bexley was an orchestra director, singer, dancer, stand-up comedian, and actor. In the early 1940s, Bexley started doing comedy in upstate New York. He worked with Milton Berle, Danny Kaye, and Henny Youngman, and danced with Sammy Davis Jr. Bexley was the first black stand-up comedian to do the hotel circuit in the Borscht Belt. During his travels, he met many black entertainers, including Redd Foxx. They worked in New York City, Philadelphia, Baltimore, and New Jersey. Early in his career, he performed with a dance group called Three Shades of Rhythm. Before his television debut, he did theater in Los Angeles and New York City.

=== Redd Foxx and Sanford and Son ===
When Bexley returned from Europe in 1969, he and Foxx were cast together in Cotton Comes to Harlem (1970). Upon Bexley's arrival from Asia in 1971, Foxx sent for him to join the sitcom Sanford and Son. Foxx convinced Bud Yorkin and Aaron Ruben to hire Bexley to play one of Fred G. Sanford's friends. At the time, Bexley was 62 years old and never had appeared on television before. Bexley gained popularity for his portrayal as Bubba on the series, a very successful "rerun sitcom" today. Sanford and Son was an instant hit and remained in the top 10 programs for 5 of 6 years from 1972 to 1977. Bexley reprised Bubba in the short-lived sequel Sanford Arms, which had many of the same characters but not Foxx and Demond Wilson.

=== Later career ===
He appeared in many television shows such as Cheers, Hunter and Laverne & Shirley as well as the 1976 film Sparkle. One of his later appearances on television was in an episode of Foxx's The Royal Family. In the episode, "New Beginnings", Bexley made a special guest appearance as an old friend of Al Royal's (Foxx) who attends his funeral. In 1989, Bexley had a sitcom in the works that he had written and would have starred, titled Cee Cashman and 'Yul Stay Broke. It was a story about a Black Jew who owns a pawnshop. Just before his death, Bexley was still writing for stage and television. Clarence Williams, Sr., a friend of Bexley, said the actor had completed several scripts, but he knew of no current plans to produce them.

== Later life ==
In 1989, Bexley was awarded the Outstanding Senior Citizen of the Year award by the Support the Artists of America (STAA) in Orlando, Florida. Since moving to Hampton, Virginia (before that, he resided in the San Fernando Valley) during the 1990s, Bexley was still quite active, always working on new ideas for shows and live performances. Bexley made personal appearances and signed autographs on many occasions, including the Newmarket Fair Day-Talent Show in September 1996, and the Aberdeen Athletic Association in June 1996. One of Bexley's later signings was during his attendance at the NASA Langley Research Center's Black History Program in February 1997. These types of activities added to his longevity.

== Personal life and death ==
Bexley had a close friendship with Redd Foxx until Foxx's death in October 1991. He was an honorary pallbearer at Foxx's funeral in Las Vegas. Their friendship lasted for nearly 50 years. Bexley lived much of his life in Los Angeles, but after injuring his hip, moved to Hampton, Virginia, in 1996 to live with a friend, who served as his caregiver. Bexley died of heart and kidney failure on April 15, 1997, at Hampton Sentara Hospital. He was 87 years old. His wife was Sally Bexley, with whom he had two daughters.

== Filmography ==
- Cotton Comes to Harlem (1970)
- What's Up, Doc? (1972) as Skycap
- Sparkle (1976) as Bubbles
- Little Miss Marker (1980) as Sam
- Vibes (1988) as Lou
