= Gary Koftinoff =

Canadian film and television music composer

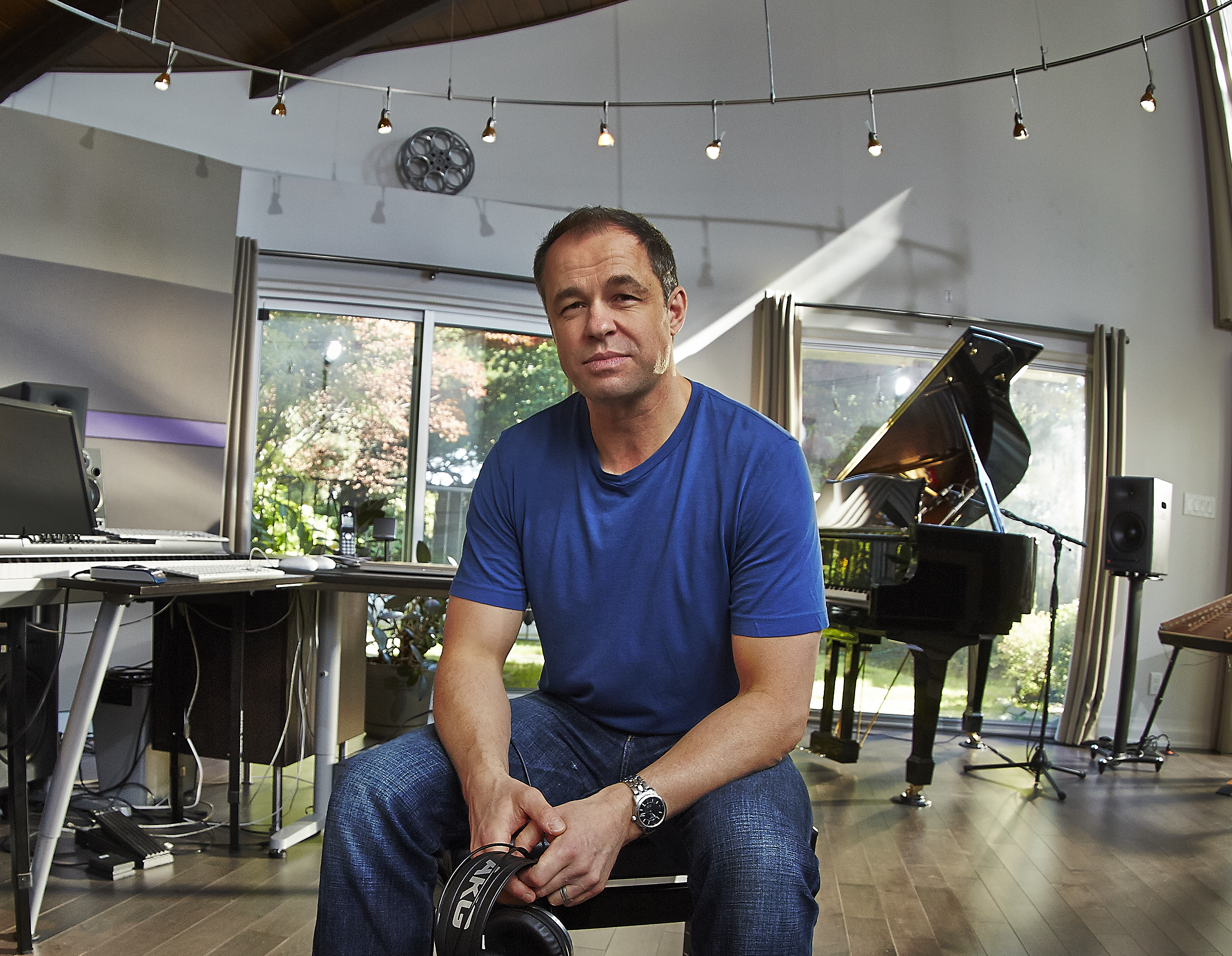
Koftinoff in 2014

Gary Koftinoff is a Canadian film score composer of music for film and television. In 2018 he won an ASCAP Screen Award for Top Cable Television Series and a Socan Award for Domestic Television Series for his score on the medical drama Saving Hope (CTV/ION). Saving Hope (Ion) accumulated the most credits on Amazon, Hulu and Netflix during the 2017 survey year of ASCAP. In 2014 he received a CSA Nomination "Best Score for a Dramatic Series" for Saving Hope. In 2005 he received a Gemini Award for Best Original Score for a Dramatic Series for "Dark Oracle" (YTV), and in 2007 he won a Film & TV Music Award for Best Score for a Non-Animated Children’s TV Program for the 70 episode Disney Channel series "Life With Derek" (Disney/Family Channel).

Additionally, Koftinoff has had three other Gemini nominations for his work on over 30 films and over 200 episodes of television, all composed for a client list that includes NBC, CTV, Lifetime/Sony, Chesler/Perlmutter Ent., Shaftesbury Films, Screendoor, Cloud Ten Productions and Peace Arch Entertainment.

Recent work includes his scores for Salem Falls (Lifetime), The Devil's Teardrop (Lifetime/Sony) and Valemont (MTV).

For the film Spirit Bear: The Simon Jackson Story (CBC) Koftinoff created the large-scale sound of the original score which earned him a Gemini nomination for Best Original Music Score for a Program or Mini-Series in 2007. Some of his more traditional, scores such as for the feature films Left Behind II and Judgment, were written for live orchestral performance, using between 45 and 60 musicians.

Koftinoff lives in Vancouver, BC.
