= Redd Foxx =

American comedian and actor (1922–1991)

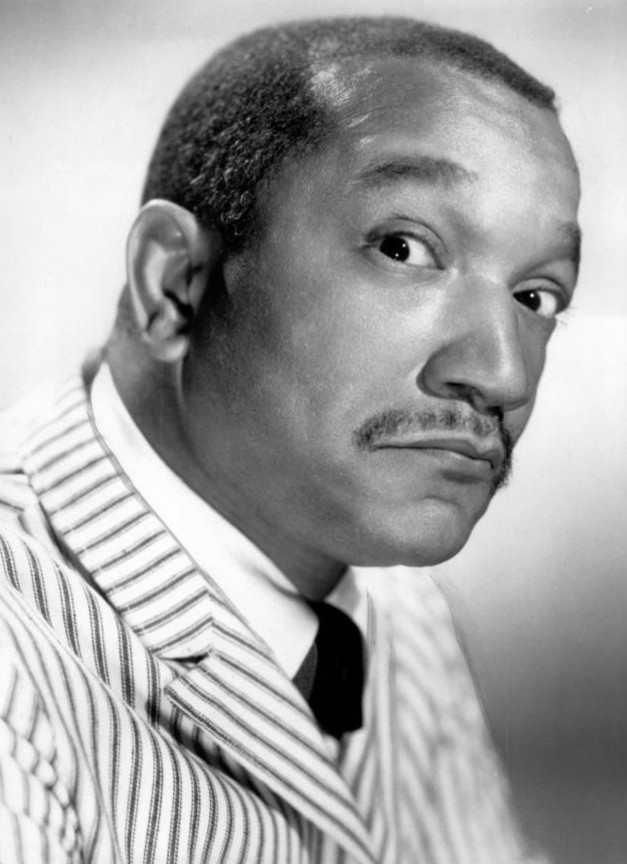
- Foxx in 1966
- Born: John Elroy Sanford; December 9, 1922; St. Louis, Missouri, U.S.
- Died: October 11, 1991 (aged 68); Los Angeles, California, U.S.
- Resting place: Palm Eastern Cemetery, Las Vegas, Nevada
- Occupations: Actor; comedian
- Notable work: Fred G. Sanford in Sanford and Son and Sanford
- Spouses: Evelyn Killebrew (m. 1948; div. 1951) Betty Jean Harris (m. 1956; div. 1975) Joi Yun Chi Chung (m. 1976; div. 1981) Ka Ho Cho (m. 1991)

Comedy career
- Years active: 1935–1991
- Medium: Stand-up; television
- Genres: Word play; observational comedy; black comedy; blue comedy; insult comedy
- Subjects: African-American culture; human sexuality; race relations; everyday life
- Website: reddfoxx.com

John Elroy Sanford (December 9, 1922 – October 11, 1991), better known by his stage name Redd Foxx, was an American stand-up comedian and actor. Foxx gained success with his raunchy nightclub act before and during the civil rights movement. Known as the "King of the Party Records", he performed on more than 50 records in his lifetime. He portrayed Fred G. Sanford on the television show Sanford and Son and starred in The Redd Foxx Show and The Royal Family.

His film projects included All the Fine Young Cannibals (1960), Cotton Comes to Harlem (1970), Norman... Is That You? (1976), and Harlem Nights (1989).

In 2004, Foxx ranked 24th in Comedy Central Presents: 100 Greatest Stand-ups of All Time. Foxx not only influenced many comedians but was often portrayed in popular culture as well, mainly as a result of his catchphrases, body language and facial expressions exhibited on Sanford and Son. During the show's six-year run, Foxx won a Golden Globe Award and received an additional three nominations, along with three Primetime Emmy Award nominations. Foxx was posthumously given a star on the St. Louis Walk of Fame in 1992.

== Early life ==
John Elroy Sanford was born on December 9, 1922 in St. Louis, Missouri and raised on Chicago's South Side. His father, Fred "Freddie" Sanford (1897–1944), was from Hickman, Kentucky, served during World War I in the 823rd company of U.S. Army U.S. Transportation Corps and worked as an electrician and an auto mechanic, but left his family sometime after 1930. He was raised by his half-Seminole mother, Mary Hughes (1903–1993) from Ellisville, Mississippi, his grandmother, and his minister. Foxx attended DuSable High School in Chicago's Bronzeville neighborhood with future Chicago mayor Harold Washington. Foxx had two older brothers, Fred Jr., and Leonard, who died shortly after his birth in 1921. On July 27, 1939, at the age of 16, Foxx performed on the Major Bowes Amateur Hour radio show as part of the Jump Swinging Six.

In the 1940s, he befriended Malcolm Little, later known as Malcolm X, a fellow dishwasher at Jimmy's Chicken Shack in Harlem. Both men had reddish hair, so Sanford was called "Chicago Red" after his hometown and Malcolm was known as "Detroit Red". In Malcolm's autobiography, Foxx is referred to as "the funniest dishwasher on this earth". During World War II, Foxx dodged the draft by eating half a bar of soap before his physical, a trick that resulted in heart palpitations. On September 30, 1946, Foxx recorded five songs for the Savoy label under the direction of Teddy Reig.

== Career ==
=== Nightclub act ===
Foxx's raunchy nightclub act proved successful. After performing on the East Coast, his big break came after singer Dinah Washington insisted that he come to Los Angeles, where Dootsie Williams of Dootone records caught his act at the Brass Rail nightclub. Foxx was one of the first black comics to play to white audiences on the Las Vegas Strip. He was signed to a long-term contract and released a series of comedy albums on a half-dozen record labels that quickly became cult favorites.

=== Sanford and Son ===
Foxx achieved his most widespread fame starring in the television sitcom Sanford and Son, an adaptation of the BBC series Steptoe and Son. Foxx played the role of Fred G. Sanford ("Fred Sanford" was Foxx's father's and brother's name), while co-star Demond Wilson played the role of his son Lamont. Fred and Lamont were owners of a junk/salvage store in Watts, California, who dealt with many humorous situations. The series was notable for its racial humor and overt prejudices which helped redefine the genre of Black situation comedy.

The series premiered on the NBC television network on January 14, 1972, and was broadcast for six seasons. In 1974, Foxx was sued for $10 million (~$50.7 million in 2025) by Tandem Productions, producers of the show, for not showing up to start taping the new season. The final episode aired on March 25, 1977.

The show also had several running gags. When angry with Lamont, Fred would often say "You big dummy!", or he would often fake heart attacks by putting his hand on his chest and saying (usually while looking up at the sky and referring to his late wife), "Oh, this is the big one! You hear that, Elizabeth? I'm coming to join ya, honey!" Fred would also complain about having "arthur-itis" to get out of work by showing Lamont his cramped hand. Foxx portrayed a character who was in his 60s, although in real life he was 48 when production began for Season 1.

Foxx used his starring role on Sanford and Son to help get jobs for acquaintances such as LaWanda Page, Slappy White, Gregory Sierra, Don Bexley, Beah Richards, Stymie Beard, Leroy Daniels, Ernest Mayhand and Pat Morita.

Wilson was asked whether he kept in touch with everybody from Sanford & Son, especially the series' star himself, after the series was canceled: "No. I saw Redd Foxx once before he died, circa 1983, and I never saw him again. At the time I was playing tennis at the Malibu Racquet Club and I was approached by some producers about doing a Redd Foxx 50th Anniversary Special. I hadn't spoken to him since 1977, and I called the club where (Redd) was playing. And we met at Redd's office, but he was less than affable. I told those guys it was a bad idea. I never had a cross word with him. People say I'm protective of Redd Foxx in my book (Second Banana, Wilson's memoir of the Sanford years). I had no animosity toward Foxx [for quitting the show in 1977] because I had a million-dollar contract at CBS to do Baby... I'm Back!. My hurt was that he didn't come to me about throwing the towel in—I found out in the hallway at NBC from a newscaster. I forgave him and I loved Redd, but I never forgot that. The love was there. You can watch any episode and see that."

=== Post-Sanford and Son ===
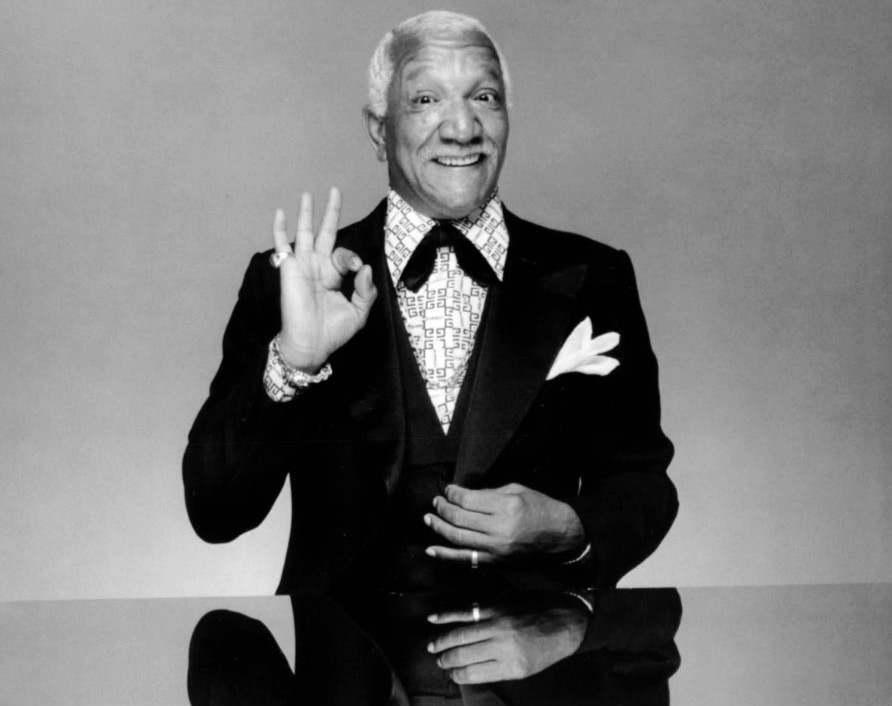
Redd Foxx in 1977

In 1977, Foxx left Sanford and Son after six seasons to star in a short-lived ABC variety show Redd Foxx, resulting in the cancellation of the NBC series. In 1980 he was back playing Fred G. Sanford in a short-lived revival/spin-off, Sanford. In 1986, he returned to television in the ABC series The Redd Foxx Show, which was canceled after 12 episodes due to low ratings. Foxx appeared as an Obi-Wan Kenobi-like character in the Star Wars special of the Donny & Marie show. In an homage to his show, he mentioned the planet Sanford, which has no sun.

In 1989, Foxx was featured in the film Harlem Nights, written, directed, produced and starring Eddie Murphy.

Foxx made a comeback with the short-lived series The Royal Family, in which he co-starred with Della Reese.

== Financial and tax problems ==
According to People magazine, "Foxx reportedly once earned $4 million in a single year, but depleted his fortune with a lavish lifestyle, exacerbated by what he called 'very bad management.'" Contributing to his problems were his divorces. Foxx spent over $150,000 awaiting his divorce from his second wife Betty Jean, which included monthly support payments of $10,000 following their separation in 1974. He also was ordered to pay $2,500 a month while awaiting divorce from third wife Joi after their separation in 1979, and then paid her a $300,000 divorce settlement in 1981.

In 1983, he filed for bankruptcy with proceedings continuing at least through 1989. The IRS filed tax liens against Redd Foxx's property for income taxes he owed for the years 1983 to 1986 totaling $755,166.21. On November 28, 1989, the IRS seized his home in Las Vegas and seven vehicles (including a 1927 Model T, a 1975 Panther J72, a 1983 Zimmer, and a Vespa motor scooter) to pay the taxes which by then had grown to $996,630 ($2.59 million in 2025), including penalties and interest. Agents also seized "$12,769 in cash and a dozen guns, including a semiautomatic pistol," among some 300 items in total, reportedly leaving only Foxx's bed. Foxx stated that the IRS "took my necklace and the ID bracelet off my wrist and the money out of my pocket ... I was treated like I wasn't human at all." It has been reported that at the time of his death in 1991, Foxx owed more than $3.6 million in taxes.

== Personal life ==
Foxx was married four times. His first marriage was to Evelyn Killebrew in 1948 and ended in divorce in 1951.

On July 5, 1956, Foxx married Betty Jean Harris, a showgirl and dancer who was a colleague of LaWanda Page (later to play Foxx's TV rival Aunt Esther on Sanford and Son). They met at a nightclub where they were appearing on the same bill. As per their agreement, Harris gave up her career in show business to become a full-time housewife. Foxx adopted Harris's nine-year-old daughter Debraca, who assumed the surname "Foxx." Harris handled most of Foxx's business ventures such as Redd Foxx Enterprises, which included a chain of record stores in Los Angeles. The couple separated in 1974 due to Foxx's infidelity. After 18 years of marriage, Foxx filed for divorce on the grounds of incompatibility in May 1974. He also obtained a restraining order that prevented Harris from "removing, hiding or secreting property" from their home in Las Vegas, and she had to return $110,000 that was removed from bank accounts. Foxx was absent from Debraca's wedding in 1975.

Foxx married his third wife, Joi Yun Chi Chung, at the Thunderbird Hotel in Las Vegas on December 31, 1976. Foxx met Joi, who was 20 years his junior, when she was a cocktail waitress at the Las Vegas Hilton, shortly after her arrival from Korea. After Foxx filed for divorce in October 1979, she responded with her own divorce suit charging him with cruelty. During their divorce proceedings, Foxx told Jet magazine: "I've been married three times and I'm out." He added: "I'd rather have kids because when I give up all this money on divorce, it should go to the children and not some guy." Their divorce was finalized in 1981; Foxx paid a $300,000 divorce settlement.

In July 1991, Foxx wed Kaho Cho from Seoul, South Korea. They met at Bally's Hotel and Casino in Las Vegas in March 1989. Despite renouncing marriage after his third divorce, Foxx told Jet magazine that he married Cho because she stuck by him through his trials and tribulations with the IRS. "She saw me with a nickel. And hopefully, she will see me with a dollar. I'll give her seventy-five cents of it," he said. They were married at Little Church of the West in Las Vegas followed by a reception at the Hacienda Hotel.

== Death ==
On October 11, 1991, during a break from rehearsals for The Royal Family, Foxx suffered a heart attack on the set. According to Della Reese, Foxx was chatting with a reporter from Entertainment Tonight. The scene he was supposed to be in was not ready to shoot, and Foxx and Reese were rehearsing. In fact, Foxx had no lines in the scene at all; he was whisked away from the interview by a producer (one who, Reese stated, quarreled with Foxx about how he could teach him to be funny) who insisted on him being there.

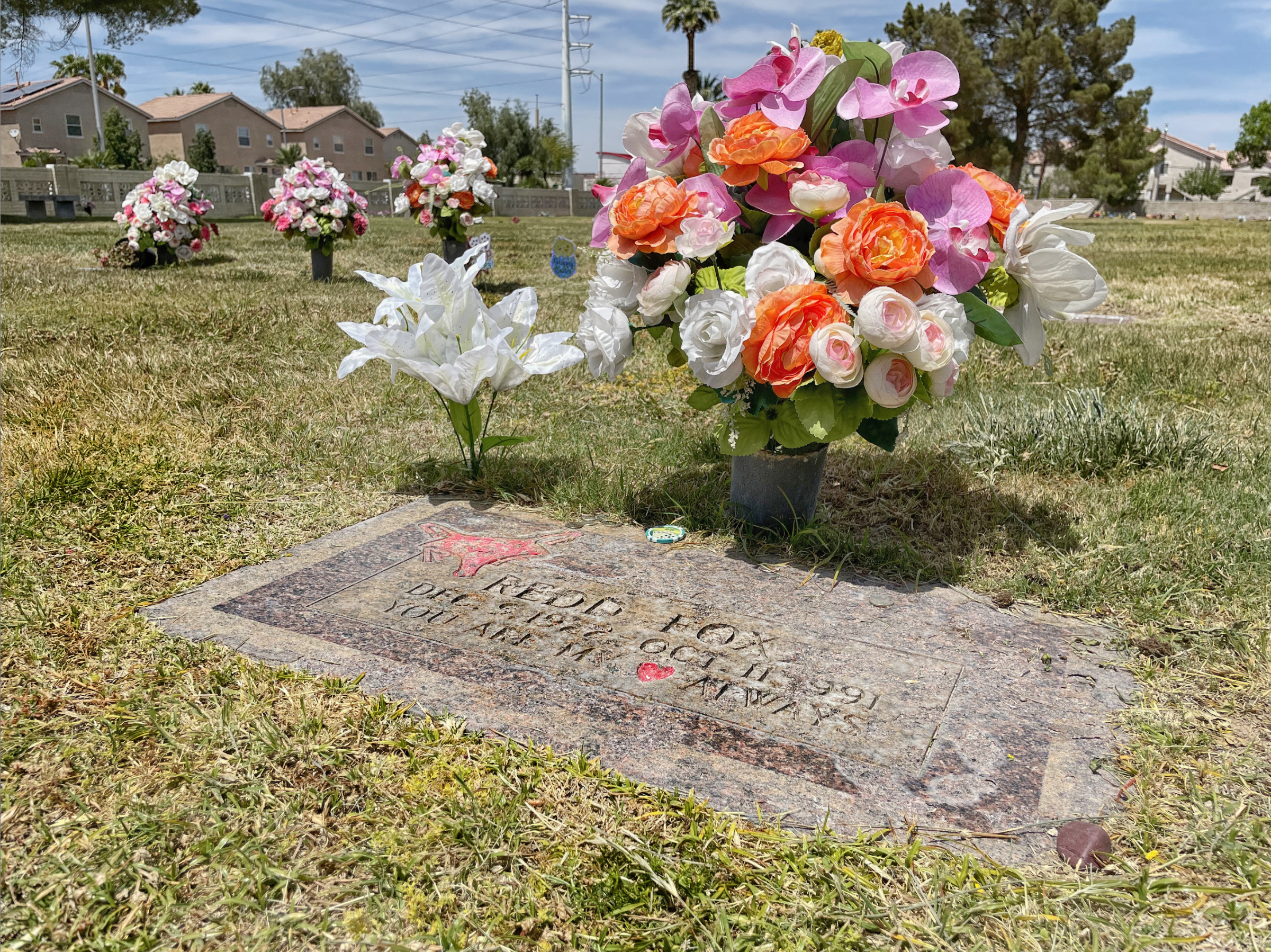
Redd Foxx' Las Vegas headstone, 2024

Foxx performed his scripted part of the scene (walking across the back of a chair) while being livid, then immediately fell to the floor. Reese said that nobody initially suspected that anything was wrong, as Foxx was famous for Fred Sanford's fake heart attacks on Sanford and Son and was particularly skilled at pratfalls. When he did not immediately rise, Reese went to the floor and heard him say "get my wife" twice. Reese called for paramedics. According to Joshua Rich at Entertainment Weekly: "It was an end so ironic that for a brief moment castmates figured Foxx–whose 1970s TV character often faked coronaries–was kidding when he grabbed a chair and fell to the floor."

Foxx was temporarily resuscitated and taken to Queen of Angels Hollywood Presbyterian Medical Center. Four and a half hours after admission, he was pronounced dead.

Redd Foxx is buried at Palm Memorial Park (also called Palm Eastern Cemetery) in Las Vegas, Nevada. His burial was entirely paid for and handled by longtime friend Eddie Murphy.

Redd Foxx's mother, Mary Sanford Carson (1903–1993), outlived her son by two years. She had been lingering in and out of a coma for a few years before her death in 1993. She is buried beside him.

== Influence ==
Comedian and actor Richard Pryor cited Redd Foxx as an influence. "He gave me inspiration and encouragement so I could be more me," Pryor told Ebony magazine in 1990. Comedian Chris Rock also cites Redd Foxx as an influence. An episode of his show Everybody Hates Chris shows young Chris Rock overhearing his parents' Redd Foxx albums and getting started doing stand-up by retelling the jokes at school. Actor and comedian Jamie Foxx has stated that he chose his professional surname as a tribute to Foxx. Pat Morita also named Foxx as his mentor from his early days as a nightclub comedian.

On Jimmy Kimmel Live, Eddie Murphy, a producer on The Royal Family, said that Redd Foxx was the most naturally funny person that he ever encountered.

== Portrayals in popular media ==
In 1990, in the pilot episode of In Living Color, in reference to Foxx's financial troubles, Foxx was portrayed by Damon Wayans, who is making a public service announcement to encourage people to pay their taxes.

In the 1992 Seinfeld episode "The Opera", Jerry chastises George for swearing during a wedding speech, saying "You were like a Redd Foxx record."

In the 1998 The Simpsons episode "The Last Temptation of Krust," Krusty the Clown laments, "Then you got these lady comics talking about stuff that would embarrass Redd Foxx--God rest his smutty soul."

In the 1998 film Why Do Fools Fall in Love, Foxx is portrayed by Aries Spears. He is shown performing a stand-up comedy routine.

Foxx appears as a minor character in the 2009 James Ellroy novel Blood's a Rover. He gives a bawdy eulogy at the wake of Scotty Bennett, a murdered rogue LAPD detective, including the line: "Scotty Bennett was fucking a porcupine. I gots to tell you motherfuckers that it was a female porcupine, so I don't see nothing perverted in it."

== Filmography ==
- All the Fine Young Cannibals (1960) as Redd, Piano Player at Rose's (uncredited)
- Cotton Comes to Harlem (1970) as Uncle Budd / Booker Washington Sims
- Norman... Is That You? (1976) as Ben Chambers
- Days of Heaven (1978) as Himself / Special Thanks
- Harlem Nights (1989) as Bennie Wilson
- Surely, You Jest (2019) as Himself (Posthumously - archive footage)
- Dolemite Is My Name (2019) as Performer ("On the Loose") (Posthumously - archive footage)

=== TV shows ===
- Sanford and Son (1972–77) as Fred G. Sanford
- The Dean Martin Celebrity Roast (1974) as Himself
- The Captain & Tennille Show (one episode) (1976) as Himself
- Redd Foxx aka The Redd Foxx Comedy Hour (1977–78) as Himself
- HBO On Location with Redd Foxx (1978) as Himself
- Sanford (1980–81) as Fred G. Sanford
- Redd Foxx: Video in a Plain Brown Wrapper (1983) as Himself
- Amos 'n' Andy: Anatomy of a Controversy (TV movie) (1983) as Himself / Special Thanks
- Viva Shaf Vegas (1986) as Himself
- The Redd Foxx Show (1986) as Al Hughes
- Motown Merry Christmas (1987) as Himself / Various Skits
- Ghost of a Chance (1987) as Ivory Clay
- The Royal Family (1991) as Alfonso Royal
- Biography - Redd Foxx: Say It Like It Is (January 11, 2000) as Himself (Posthumously - archive footage)
- E! True Hollywood Story: Redd Foxx (2001) as Himself (Posthumously - archive footage)
- Laugh Mobb Present - Episodes 3 & 4 (2012) as Himself / Special Thanks (Posthumously - archive footage)
- Unsung Hollywood - Redd Foxx (2015) as Himself (Posthumously - archive footage)
- History of Comedy (TV Series - Season 1, Episode 1) (2017) as Himself (Posthumously - archive footage)
- The Marvelous Mrs. Maisel (TV series - Season 1, Episode 4; Season 2, Episode 3) (2017–2018) as Himself/Writer (Posthumously - archive footage)

== Discography ==
=== Authentic Records ===
- 385 - Song Plugging/The New Soap (78 single)
- 390 - The Jackasses/The Race Track (78 single)

=== Savoy Records discography ===
==== 78 Singles ====
- 630A – Let's Wiggle a Little Woogie
- 630B – Lucky Guy
- 631A – Fine Jelly Blues
- 631B – Redd Foxx Blues
- 645B – Shame on You

=== Dooto/Dootone Records discography ===
==== Albums ====
- DTL01 – The Best Laff
- DTL214 – Laff Of The Party Vol. 1 (1956)
- DTL219 – Laff Of The Party Vol. 2
- DTL220 – Laff Of The Party Vol. 3
- DTL227 – Laff Of The Party Vol. 4 (1956)
- DTL234 – The Best Of Redd Foxx Vol. 1
- DTL236 – Laff Of The Party Vol.7
- DTL249 – Burlesque Humor
- DTL253 – The Side Splitter Vol.1 (1959)
- DTL265 – The Laff of the Party Vol. 8 (1957)
- DTL270 – The Side Splitter Vol. 2 (1959)
- DTL274 – The Best of Party Fun (Red Foxx and Others)
- DTL275 – Racy Tales (Also released as The New Race Track) (1959)
- DTL290 – Redd Foxx Funn
- DTL295 – Sly Sex (1960)
- DTL298 – Have One On Me (1960)
- DTL801 – Laffarama (1961)
- DTL804 – Wild Party (1961)
- DTL809 – This is Foxx
- DTL815 – He's Funny That Way (1964)
- DTL820 – Red Foxx at Jazzville U.S.A. (1961)
- DTL830 – The New Fugg (1962)
- DTL828 – Hearty Party Laffs (1962)
- DTL832 – Laff Along With Foxx (1962) (compilation)
- DTL834 – Crack Up (1963)
- DTL835 – Funny Stuff (1963)
- DTL836 - The Battle of Sex (with Hattie Noel)
- DTL838 - Naughties But Goodies (1965)
- DTL840 – Adults Only (1967)
- DTL845 – Jokes I Can't Tell On Television (1969)
- DTL846 – Shed House Humor (1969)
- DTL853 – Sanford & Foxx (1972)
- DTL854 – Foxx and Jazz
- DTL858 – Dirty Redd (1973)
- DTL860 – Funky Tales From a Dirty Old Junkman (1972)

==== Singles ====
- DTL385 – The New Soap/Song Plugging
- DTL390 – The Jackasses/The Race Track
- DTL397 – The Honeymooners/The Sneezes
- DTL402 – Beans And Pineapple Sauce/The Army
- DTL408 – The Two Oars/The Preacher's Bicycle
- DTL411 – The Dead Jackass/Women Over Forty
- DTL416 – Real Pretty Baby/It's Fun To Be Living In The Crazy House
- DTL418 – Best Of Redd Foxx Parts 1&2
- DTL421 – The House/Sex And Orange Juice
- DTL426 – Hollywood Playboy/The Dogs Meeting
- DTL436 – South Of The Border/The Plastic Surgeon
- DTL453 – The Dear John Letter/Honesty Is The Best Policy
- DTL455 – The Shoe Shine Boy/The Royal Thighs And Others
- DTL458 – 118 Ways To Make Love/Pregnancy Co-Operation
- DTL460 – No Teeth/With My Teeth/The Best Years/Deep Sea Diver
- DTL464 – Christmas Hard Ties/Jaw Resting

=== Atlantic Records discography ===
- SD 18157 – You Gotta Wash Your Ass (1975)

=== Loose Cannon/Island Records discography ===
- 528 061 – Uncensored (1995)

=== Gusto Records discography ===
- KSD-1072 – Bare Facts

=== King Records discography ===
- KSD-1073 – Pass the Apple Eve
- KSD-1074 – In a Nutshell
- KS-1135 – Matinee Idol
- SK-754 – X-Rated v. 4
- SK-756 – X-Rated v. 6
- K-13385 - Redd Foxx Part One/Part Two

=== Laff Records discography ===
- A170 – Pryor Goes Foxx Hunting (split LP including one half of Richard Pryor's "Craps")
- A175 - Red & White!! (with Slappy White)
- A184 - Down N' Dirty (with Richard Pryor)
- A197 - Comedy Roots (with Richard & Willie)
- A203 – I Ain't Lied Yet
- A210 - Uncensored (1980)
- A228 - Everything's Big

=== Loma/Warner Bros. Records discography ===
- 5901 – Both Sides of Redd Foxx (1966)
- 5905 – On the Loose
- 5906 – Redd Foxx "live" : Las Vegas! (1968)
- 5908 – Foxx-A-Delic (1968)

=== MF Records discography ===
- RF1 – Laff Your Head off
- RF2 – Laff Your Ass Off
- RF3 – Redd Foxx At Home
- RF4 – A Whole Lot of Soul
- RF5 – At His Best
- RF6 – Doin' His Own Thing
- RF7 – Say It Like It Is
- RF8 – Is Sex Here To Stay
- RF9 – Where It's At
- RF10 – Huffin' And A Puffin'
- RF11 – I Am Curious, Black
- RF12 – Three Or Four Times A Day
- RF13 – Mr. Hot Pants
- RF14 – Hot Flashes
- RF15 – Restricted
- RF16 – Superstar
- RF17 – Spice can Be Nice!
- RF18 – Strictly For Adults
- RF19 – Black and Blue
- RF20 – Elizabeth, I'm Coming!
- RF21 – Redd 75
- MF102 - The Very Best of Redd Foxx

=== Reddy Freddy Records ===
- RF01 - Foxx Live 85 (1985)

=== Master Classics Records discography ===
==== Albums ====
- Gettin' Down N' Dirty (2008)

=== Comedy Classics discography ===
==== Albums ====
- The Ultimate Comedy Collection (2011)
