= John Cann =

John Cann may refer to:

- John Cann (politician) (1860–1940), New South Wales politician
- John Cann (athlete) (born 1938), Australian athlete
- John Du Cann (1946–2011), English guitarist
