= Under Heavy Fire =

2001 war film by Sidney J. Furie

- Original poster
- Directed by: Sidney J. Furie
- Screenplay by: Gregg Mellott
- Story by: Sidney J Furie
- Produced by: Gary Howsam
- Starring: Casper Van Dien; Jaimz Woolvett; Bobby Hosea; Joseph Griffin; Carre Otis; Kenneth Johnson; Daniel Kash; Martin Kove
- Cinematography: Curtis Petersen
- Edited by: Saul Pincus
- Music by: Amin Bhatia
- Production company: GFT Entertainment
- Distributed by: Screen Media Films (US); Addictive Films (UK)
- Release date: 2001
- Running time: 113 mins
- Countries: Canada; United States
- Language: English
- Budget: $13,000,000 (estimated)

Under Heavy Fire, also known as Going Back, is a 2001 American feature war film directed by Sidney J. Furie and starring Casper Van Dien, Jaimz Woolvett, Bobby Hosea, Joseph Griffin, Carre Otis, Kenneth Johnson, Daniel Kash, Martin Kove. It was filmed under the title Going Back in the Philippines and Vietnam in April and May 2000. Post-production continued in Canada for another 14 months.

== Synopsis ==
Twenty-five years since the Vietnam War ended, a group of American veterans return to Vietnam and meet up with TV journalist Kathleen Martin (played by Carre Otis), who is assigned to cover the reunion of the men from Echo Company, a Marine Rifle Company, who fought in the Vietnam War. Soon, they are joined by their old Captain named Ramsey (played by Casper Van Dien), and they revisit the old battlefields they fought in and experience flashbacks of their time in the war during 1968. The film explores many of the wounds war inflicts on soldiers that last for a lifetime. It also portrays the Vietnamese today as a very forgiving people.

== Cast ==
- Casper Van Dien as Captain Ramsey
- Jaimz Woolvett as "Tex"
- Bobby Hosea as Ray
- Joseph Griffin as "Red" Fuentes
- Kenny Johnson as Jimmy Joe
- Carré Otis as Kathleen
- Daniel Kash as Eric
- Martin Kove as Father Brazinski
- Austin Farwell as "Doc" Jordan
- Jason Blicker as Fred
- Jim Morse as Gunnery Sergeant "Gunny" Bailey
- Deborah Zoe as Irene
- Pablo Espinosa as Chico
