= Nathaniel Taylor (actor) =

American actor (1938–2019)

- Born: March 31, 1938; St. Louis, Missouri, U.S.
- Died: February 27, 2019 (aged 80); Los Angeles, California, U.S.
- Occupation: Actor
- Years active: 1969–1986; 2016
- Known for: Rollo Lawson (Sanford and Son, Grady, Sanford)
- Spouse(s): Bernice Gordon-Taylor (m. 19??; div. 19??); Loretta Taylor (m. 2000)
- Children: 7

Nathaniel Taylor (March 31, 1938 – February 27, 2019) was an American television and film actor best known for portraying Rollo Lawson on the 1970s sitcoms Sanford and Son, Grady and the 1980s sitcom Sanford.

He acted in several movies and TV shows and later created a performing arts studio. Some of the major shows he acted in are The Redd Foxx Show, Police Story and What's Happening!! . Taylor also appeared in the films Trouble Man (1972), Willie Dynamite (1974), and Passing Through (1977).

== Early life ==
Taylor was born on March 31, 1938, in St. Louis, Missouri. Growing up, he had two brothers, Richard and Eugene, and three sisters Betty, Mary, and Rose.

== Career ==
Before becoming an actor, Taylor worked as an electrician at the Performing Arts Society of Los Angeles (PASLA). His mentor, Larry Clark, suggested he try out for a part. Clark had him read a few lines to him and then sent him down to Redd Foxx's room, who talked with Taylor about their hometown, St. Louis. Foxx told Taylor that he had the role which would become Rollo Lawson.

Taylor was best known for his recurring role as Rollo Lawson in the 1970s sitcom Sanford and Son, a role he later reprised on its short-lived 1980–1981 spin-off Sanford. He later played the first version of Jim-Jam with Redd Foxx on the 1986 series The Redd Foxx Show. In the late 1970s, he played Rerun's (Fred Berry) brother–in–law, Ike, in the sitcom What's Happening!!. Taylor also reprised the role of Rollo Lawson in the short–lived Grady. He also guest starred in episodes of The Bill Cosby Show, Adam 12, and Police Story.

Taylor also appeared in Trouble Man as one of Mr. Big's henchmen. In 1973, he acted in Clark's As Above, So Below. Taylor later became the Executive Director of Performing Arts Society of Los Angeles (PASLA). He then starred in the blaxploitation film Willie Dynamite, Clark's drama Passing Through and the thriller The Hunter. In 2016, he acted as himself in the short film Auditioning for Nathaniel directed by Kevin Jerome Everson.

BlueLine Classics, LLC bought the original 1952 Ford F1 used in Sanford and Son. The owners, Jeff Canter and Tim Franko, restored the vehicle in October 2015. They then decided to reunite a cast member with the truck they preserved. Canter then contacted Taylor. Afterwards, Taylor called Canter and agreed to sign autographs with the restored Ford truck in October 2015. In June 2016, Taylor was asked to sign autographs at the Hard Rock Rocksino Northfield Park with the 1951 Ford F1 'Sanford and Son Salvage' truck.

== Personal life and death ==
Taylor was friends with fellow actor Rocco Karega, hip-hop promoter Alonzo Williams, and producer Darius Owens of North Carolina In 2000, he married Loretta Taylor. They had two children together. Taylor additionally had five children from a previous marriage to Bernice Gordon-Taylor After Taylor stopped acting, he opened a performing arts studio for young actors.

In April 1986, the Los Angeles Police Department arrested and booked Taylor on burglary charges along with his brother, James, and Pang Shing. About $200,000 in computers and typewriters were seized. The arrest came within hours of the Sports Connection athletic club in West Los Angeles reported the theft of 10 IBM typewriters and a computer.

On February 23, 2019, Taylor was rushed to Ronald Reagan UCLA Medical Center after suffering from a heart attack. He died there from the complications on February 27, 2019.

== Filmography ==
=== Film ===
| Year | Title | Role | Notes | Ref. |
|---|---|---|---|---|
| 1972 | Trouble Man | Leroy | Drama film directed by Ivan Dixon; Credited as Jita Hadi | |
| 1972 | Black Girl | Supporting Players | Drama film directed by Ossie Davis; Based on the play of the same name and adapted screenplay by J.E. Franklin | |
| 1973 | As Above, So Below | Jita Hadi | Drama film directed by Larry Clark | |
| 1974 | Willie Dynamite | Sugar | Blaxploitation film directed by Gilbert Moses | |
| 1977 | Passing Through | Eddie Warmack | Drama film directed by Larry Clark & co-written by Clark and Ted Lange | |
| 1980 | The Hunter | Trotter | Thriller film directed by Buzz Kulik | |
| 2016 | Auditioning for Nathaniel | Himself | Short film directed by Kevin Jerome Everson | |

=== Television ===
| Year | Title | Role | Notes | Ref. |
|---|---|---|---|---|
| 1969 | Listen to the Man | Starring role | Made-for-TV-Movie directed by Richard Kaplowitz; Credited as Jita Hadi | |
| 1971 | The Bold Ones: The Senator | Job Trainee Machinist | Episode: "A Single Blow of a Sword" (S 1:Ep 8); Credited as Jita Hadi | |
| 1971 | The Bill Cosby Show | Bob Steffen | Episode: "The Power of a Tree" (S 2:Ep 23); Credited as Jita Hadi | |
| 1972–77 | Sanford and Son | Rollo Lawson | Recurring role (32 episodes) | |
| 1973 | Adam-12 | Joe | Episode: "Keeping Tabs" (S 5:Ep 23) | |
| 1974 | Harry O | Bartender | Episode: "Eyewitness" (S 1:Ep 6); Credited as Nathaniel 'Jitahadi' Taylor | |
| 1975 | Police Story | Thurman | Episode: "The Execution" (S 2:Ep 18); Credited as Nathaniel 'Jitahadi' Taylor | |
| 1975 | Grady | Rollo Lawson | Episode: "Grady's Night In" (S 1:Ep 4) | |
| 1977–1979 | What's Happening!! | Ike | Episodes: "Give Me Odds" (S 2:Ep 8); "Food Poisoning" (S 3:Ep 16) | |
| 1980 | Sanford | Rollo Lawson | Main cast (season 1 only) | |
| 1985 | 227 | Man #3 | Episode: "Football Widow" (S 1:Ep 10) | |
| 1986 | The Redd Foxx Show | Jim-Jam | Episodes: "High School Blues" (S 1:Ep 2); "My Funny Valentine" (S 1:Ep 4) | |

=== Documentaries ===
| Year | Title | Role | Notes | Ref. |
|---|---|---|---|---|
| 2011 | Spirits of Rebellion: Black Film at UCLA | Eddie Warmack | Archival footage of Passing Through; Directed by Zeinabu irene Davis | |
| 2016 | American Masters | Himself | Episode: "Norman Lear: Just Another Version of You" | |
