= Shirley Wilson (disambiguation) =

Shirley Wilson (1925–2021) was an American football coach.

Shirley Wilson may also refer to:

- Shirley Wilson, character in What's Happening! played by Shirley Hemphill
- Shirley Wilson, character in In the Flesh (TV series)
