= Mary Jane Harper Cried Last Night =

- Promotional poster
- Genre: Drama
- Written by: Joanna Lee
- Directed by: Allen Reisner
- Starring: Susan Dey; John Vernon; Rhea Perlman; Kevin McCarthy; Bernie Casey; James Karen; Natasha Ryan; Priscilla Pointer
- Music by: Billy Goldenberg
- Country of origin: United States
- Original language: English

Production
- Producers: Ralph Riskin; Joanna Lee
- Cinematography: Gayne Rescher
- Editor: Kenneth R. Koch
- Running time: 101 minutes
- Production company: Christiana Productions

Original release
- Network: CBS
- Release: October 5, 1977

Mary Jane Harper Cried Last Night is an American television film starring Susan Dey as an abusive mother. The film, which aired in October 1977, was written and produced by Joanna Lee and featured a supporting cast including Rhea Perlman, Kevin McCarthy and Natasha Ryan as the title character, Mary Jane Harper.

== Plot ==
Mary Jane Harper is admitted to the hospital for a broken arm. While examining Mary Jane, Dr. Angela Buccieri notices a couple of healed-over cigarette burns on the girl's buttocks. She questions Mary Jane's mother Rowena, who claims that Mary Jane is accident-prone and a crier. Dr. Buccieri takes her concerns to Dr. Orrin Helgerson, the hospital's director of pediatrics and requests a set of full-skeletal x-rays to see if there are any healed-over broken bones. The director, a good friend of Rowena's father, who is also a trustee of the hospital, tells Dr. Buccieri not to pursue the matter any further.

Dr. Buccieri still takes the matter to Child Protective Services. A social worker named Dave Williams visits Rowena and recommends that she join Parents Anonymous to help with her stress. After he leaves, Rowena grows agitated, realizing that someone at the hospital has reported her. She hears Mary Jane crying for her. In her fear, she goes into the nursery and yells at Mary Jane. When Mary Jane tries to look away from her mother, she grabs her, digging her nails into her skin.

Rowena decides to attend a Parents Anonymous meeting, leaving Mary Jane alone. While she is at the meeting, a fire starts at her home. The neighbors call 9-1-1, Mary Jane is taken to the hospital for possible smoke inhalation, and Rowena is arrested for child endangerment. Rowena's parents appoint her a lawyer, who says that her mind has become unsettled by the abandonment of her husband and that she has agreed to seek therapeutic help. Judge Carlson accepts this.

Dr. Buccieri and Dave Williams work together to find evidence against Rowena. They are undermined by the efforts of Dr. Helgerson, who fears litigation from Rowena's father.

In court, Judge Carlson is presented with the evidence, but has been informed by Rowena's psychiatrist that her disturbed mental state is only temporary. Within two months, they will have another hearing where they will decide about legal custody of Mary Jane, who is returned to Rowena.

During a therapeutic session, Rowena begins to have a breakthrough just as the session ends. Now paranoid, Rowena takes Mary Jane and goes off to a motel in the desert. In the motel room, Rowena begins hallucinating and becomes agitated, causing Mary Jane to cry. Rowena calls Judy, the woman who runs the Parents Anonymous group, who tells her to go to the motel manager and have him call the police. Not wanting the police to know where she is, Rowena hangs up. She tries to calmly tell Mary Jane to stop crying, but winds up smothering her with a pillow. Dave Williams and the police arrive at the motel where they find Rowena cradling Mary Jane's body and singing to it.

== Cast ==
- Susan Dey ... Rowena Harper
- John Vernon ... Dr. Orrin Helgerson
- Kevin McCarthy ... Tom Atherton
- Rhea Perlman ... Judy
- Tricia O'Neil ... Dr. Angela Buccieri
- Bernie Casey ... Dave Williams
- Priscilla Pointer ... Laura Atherton
- Phillip R. Allen ... Mr. Bernards
- Natasha Ryan ... Mary Jane Harper
- Alma Beltran ... Maria
- Ray Buktenica ... Dr. Mark Handelman
- Ivan Bonar ... Judge Carlson
- James Karen ... Dr. Sutterman
- Chip Lucia ... Bill Harper
- Sandra Deel ... Mrs. Ramish
- Elizabeth Robinson ... Jeanne Williams
- Linda Gillen ... Joy
- Fritzi Burr ... Nancy West
- Frances Fong ... Ivy Chin
- Warren Munson ... Mr. West
- Lucy Lee Flippin ... Mother in Park

== Novelization ==
A novelization of the film, packaged and by-lined to give the impression of being the story source, was published by Signet Books shortly after the film aired, to capitalize on its ratings impact. (There is no record of the book having ever existed prior to this paperback edition.) The stated authorship is shared by Joanna Lee and T.S. Cook.

== Awards and nominations ==
Mary Jane Harper Cried Last Night was nominated at 1978's Primetime Emmy Awards for Outstanding Achievement in Video Tape Editing for a Special.
