= Ernest Lee Thomas =

American actor (born 1949)

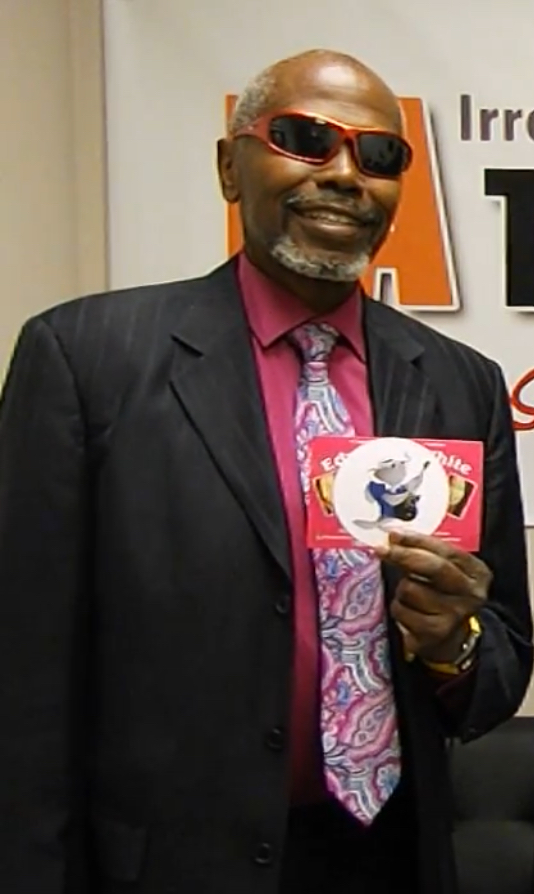
- Thomas in 2015
- Born: March 26, 1949 (age 77); Gary, Indiana, U.S.
- Occupation: Actor
- Years active: 1974–present
- Known for: Roger "Raj" Thomas on What's Happening!! and What's Happening Now!!, and Mr. Omar on Everybody Hates Chris
- Children: Pam Trotter
- Parent: Lizza Latham
- Relatives: Lizzie Miller (Grandparent) Rosie Thomas (Sibling) Anton Thomas (Sibling)

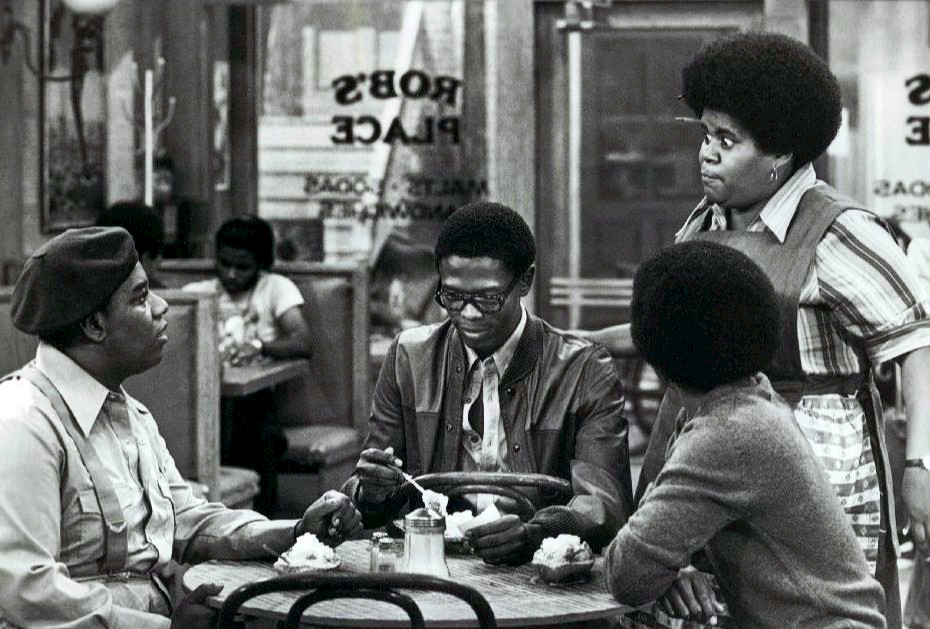
From TV's What's Happening!! (1977). Seated, L-R: Fred Berry, Ernest Lee Thomas, and Haywood Nelson (back to camera). Standing: Shirley Hemphill.

Ernest Lee Thomas (born March 26, 1949) is an American actor. He is best known for his role as Roger "Raj" Thomas on the 1970s ABC sitcom What's Happening!! and its 1980s syndicated sequel, What's Happening Now!!, and for his recurring role as Mr. Omar on Everybody Hates Chris.

== Early career and What's Happening!! ==
Thomas was born in Gary, Indiana, and began his professional acting career as a Broadway actor, appearing in the 1974 revival production of Love for Love and in the 1975 revival of The Member of the Wedding. Both shows starred actress Glenn Close. Shortly after he moved to Los Angeles to pursue a career as a TV/film actor. In the fall of 1975 he received a role on an episode of The Jeffersons. It was during the taping of the show that he learned of an audition for a sitcom loosely based on the 1975 film Cooley High. Thomas auditioned, won the lead role, and filmed the television pilot, which tested poorly. The concept was quickly reworked into a more light-hearted approach to the source material, and became known as Central Avenue, before settling on the title What's Happening!!. Thomas was the only cast member retained from the pilot, and took the lead role of Roger "Raj" Thomas. The new "summer series" became a ratings hit, and was expanded to a full series, airing from 1976 to 1979.

During the show's run, Thomas was involved in other film and TV projects including Baretta, The Brady Bunch Hour and the film A Piece of the Action starring Sidney Poitier and Bill Cosby. During the first season of What's Happening!!, Thomas was one of the final two actors to be considered for the lead role of Kunta Kinte in the breakthrough miniseries Roots, which eventually went to LeVar Burton. Thomas would go on to play the smaller role of Kailuba in the miniseries.

== What's Happening Now!! and later career ==
After a six-year hiatus from TV and film acting, Ernest resumed his role as Roger "Raj" Thomas in the sequel What's Happening Now!!. The show aired in first-run syndication from 1985 to 1988.

Since the show's cancellation Thomas has guest starred on a number of popular TV dramas and sitcoms including In the Heat of the Night (which co-starred his TV wife Anne-Marie Johnson, from What's Happening Now!!), The Parent 'Hood, Martin (which starred his What's Happening Now!! co-star Martin Lawrence), Soul Food, The Steve Harvey Show, All About the Andersons and more recently Just Jordan. He has also appeared in a number of films, including a supporting role in Malcolm X and a cameo in Dickie Roberts: Former Child Star. He later had a recurring role as funeral director Mr. Omar on the TV sitcom Everybody Hates Chris. He had an uncredited guest spot as Ernest T "Bass" on the TV show Are We There Yet?; it was titled "The Satchel Paige Episode" and had him playing a Flavor Flav-type personality.

In 2012, Thomas was cast in rocker/horror movie director Rob Zombie's 2012 film The Lords of Salem. In 2016, he was in a comedic body horror short film called Earworm.

== Personal life ==
Thomas has stated in multiple interviews to have had a romantic relationship with actress Kim Cattrall during her time as a student at the American Academy of Dramatic Arts in the 1970s.

Thomas has an eye condition called amblyopia. He is a member of Kappa Alpha Psi fraternity.

== Filmography ==
=== Film ===
| Year | Title | Role | Notes |
|---|---|---|---|
| 1977 | A Piece of the Action | John | |
| 1986 | That's My Mama Now! | Roger 'Rog' Thomas | TV movie |
| 1991 | Kiss and Be Killed | Det. Ross | |
| 1992 | Malcolm X | Sidney | |
| 2003 | The Watermelon Heist | Jailer | |
| 2003 | Dickie Roberts: Former Child Star | Ernest Thomas | |
| 2007 | Paroled | Royce Henderson | |
| 2009 | Funny People | Yo Teach Principal | |
| 2012 | The Lords of Salem | Chip McDonald | |
| 2013 | Ms. 3pm | Roger Omar (voice) | Short |
| 2013 | The Pastor and Mrs. Jones | Pastor | |
| 2013 | Foreclosed | Martin Coughlin | Video |
| 2014 | The Great Central Valley Taco Tour | Roger Omar | Short |
| 2014 | Basketball Girlfriend | Lenny | |
| 2014 | Revenge | Neville | |
| 2014 | The Slimbones | Uncle AB | |
| 2015 | Mega Shark vs. Kolossus | Admiral Titus Jackson | |
| 2015 | Chocolate City | Diner Manager | |
| 2015 | The Family | Joseph Jesús | |
| 2016 | Stop Bullying Now: Live from the Big House | Himself | |
| 2016 | 79 Parts | Priore | |
| 2016 | Earworm | | Short |
| 2017 | The Gods | Olympus | |
| 2017 | The Lost Souls Cafe | Hobbi | TV movie |
| 2017 | Chocolate City: Vegas Strip | Mr. Williams | |
| 2018 | Two Wolves | Olivier | |
| 2019 | 79 Parts: Director's Cut | Bank Teller | |
| 2019 | Malcolm | Malcolm Head Assistant | Short |
| 2019 | Loved To Death | Pastor | |
| 2019 | Pawn | Brad | Short |
| 2019 | John Wynn's Mirror Mirror | Pastor Ron Johnson | |
| 2020 | Persuasive | Officer Devash | Short |
| 2021 | John Wynn's Playhouse | Ernie | |
| 2021 | Tales of a 5th Grade Robin Hood | Principal Richards | |
| 2022 | Chocolate City 3: Live Tour | Mr. Williams | |
| 2022 | John Wynn's One Hour | Doctor Thomas | |
| 2022 | 69 Parts | Bank | |

=== Television ===
| Year | Title | Role | Notes |
|---|---|---|---|
| 1975 | The Jeffersons | Ronnie Walker | Episode: "George Won't Talk" |
| 1976 | Insight | Tony Lanier | Episode: "Juvie" |
| 1976 | Baretta | Lew | Episode: "Under the City" |
| 1976–79 | What's Happening!! | Roger "Rog" Thomas | Main cast |
| 1977 | Roots | Kailuba | Episode: "Part I" |
| 1977 | The Brady Bunch Hour | Raj | Episode: "Episode #1.7" |
| 1980 | The Righteous Apples | Winston | Episode: "Point of View" |
| 1985–88 | What's Happening Now!! | Roger "Raj" Thomas | Main cast |
| 1990 | In the Heat of the Night | Off. Parker | Episode: "Brotherly Love: Part 1 & 2" |
| 1996 | The Parent 'Hood | Waiter | Episode: "Clothes Call" |
| 1996 | Martin | Prince Uche | Episode: "The Life You Save Might Make You Rich" |
| 1999 | Linc's | Ernest Thomas | Episode: "Real Time" |
| 2000 | Soul Food | Det. Craig Quinn | Episode: "Man Trouble" |
| 2000 | The Steve Harvey Show | Rev. Franklin/Rev. Charles | Episode: "Wedlocked" & "Love, Death and Basketball" |
| 2004 | All About the Andersons | Mr. Johnson | Episode: "Get Out of Dodge... Ball" |
| 2005–09 | Everybody Hates Chris | Mr. Omar | Recurring cast |
| 2007 | Just Jordan | Minister | Episode: "Practice What You Preach" |
| 2009 | Yo Teach...! | Principal Andrews | Episode: "EPK" & "MC Shakespeare" |
| 2012 | Are We There Yet? | Ernest T "Bass" | Episode: "The Satchel Paige Episode" |
| 2014 | Anonymous | Olivier | Episode: "Anonymous" |
| 2016 | Presence | Chuck Panama | Episode: "Pilot" |
| 2016 | In the Cut | Landlord | Episode: "One Night Only" |
| 2017 | Workaholics | Albert | Episode: "Faux Chella" |
| 2017 | Veep | Omar al-Saleh | Episode: "Qatar" |
| 2018 | The Chosen Ones | Ray | Episode: "Pilot" |
| 2024–25 | Everybody Still Hates Chris | Mr. Omar (voice) | Recurring cast |
