= List of What's Happening!! episodes =

Episodes of the American sitcom

Below is a list of episodes from What's Happening!!, a sitcom that aired on ABC from 1976 to 1979.

== Series overview ==
Season	Episodes	Originally released	
Season	Episodes	First released	Last released
1	21	August 5, 1976	March 31, 1977
2	22	September 22, 1977	May 11, 1978
3	22	September 21, 1978	April 28, 1979

== Episodes ==
=== Season 1 (1976–77) ===
No. overall	No. in season	Title	Directed by	Written by	Original release date
1	1	"The Runaway"	Dennis Steinmetz	Alan Eisenstock & Larry Mintz	August 5, 1976
Mama tells Raj to sacrifice a party to babysit his sister Dee because Mama got called in to work. But Raj hires Millie, an elderly neighbor, to babysit Dee while he goes on to the party. Mama later returns home to pick up Dee so that Raj can go to the party; but she finds Dee there alone with a sleeping Millie, and takes Dee with her. When Raj and his friends, Dwayne and Rerun, return home to find Dee gone, they panic, thinking she has run away. Note: This was actually the second show to be videotaped for the series. However, the producers used it as the first show because it featured a scene with Rerun, dancing.
2	2	"The Birthday Present"	Bud Yorkin	Saul Turteltaub & Bernie Orenstein	August 12, 1976
Raj needs money to buy Mama a birthday present (a blouse), so he wins it in a dice game. When Mama finds out Raj was gambling, she takes his winnings (the money needed to buy Mama the blouse). Later, after leaving the department store an IOU; Raj, Dwayne, and Rerun try to sneak the blouse out of the store and get caught. After being released back into Mama's custody, Dwayne and Rerun swipes Raj's winnings from Mama's purse and buys the blouse for Raj. Note: This episode is actually the pilot episode videotaped first for the series, but aired second, as the network wanted to feature a scene with Rerun, dancing in the premiere.
3	3	"When Daddy Comes Marching Home"	Jack Shea	Dawn Aldredge & Marion C. Freeman	August 19, 1976
After deserting Raj and Dee as little children, their father returns to town and begins to visit regularly.
4	4	"My Three Tons"	Alan Rafkin	Alan Eisenstock & Larry Mintz	August 26, 1976
Rerun auditions for a dance group, but Dwayne finds out he is hired only so they can make fun of his obesity. However, the joke is on them after Mama devises a plan to teach them a lesson.
5	5	"Saturday's Hero"	Mark Warren	Alan Eisenstock & Larry Mintz	November 13, 1976
Rerun becomes a football star, which turns him into an egotistical snob, especially after the admiration bestowed upon him by the cheerleaders. However, it all comes crashing down when he finds out he cannot play due to failing grades. Note: This episode was videotaped two months after the previous four episodes were completed (which were intended to be a short "summer series")
6	6	"The Burger Queen"	Dick Harwood	Saul Turteltaub & Bernie Orenstein	November 20, 1976
When Mama is away visiting an ill relative, Raj enters Dee in an audition to become a spokesperson for a fast food chain called Bridgeburgers, but the audition winds up a disaster. Note: Mabel King (Mama) does not appear in this episode.
7	7	"Speak for Yourself, Dwayne"	Hal Alexander	Fred S. Fox & Seaman Jacobs	November 27, 1976
Dwayne falls for Nancy, a new girl in school, but is too shy to talk to her; so he gets Raj to talk to her on his behalf. However this turns into a bad mistake for Dwayne because this leads to Raj falling for Nancy. As a result, Roger is left with guilt and one angry friend.
8	8	"Shirley's Date"	Anthony Chickey	Bob Illes & James R. Stein	December 4, 1976
Raj has sold a kid's story to a children's magazine, and to celebrate he throws a party. However, Shirley is reluctant to come because she doesn't want to show up without a date.
9	9	"Christmas"	Hal Alexander	Saul Turteltaub & Bernie Orenstein	December 11, 1976
Raj and Dee think their mother is working on Christmas Day so they spend it with their father, who recently entered their lives. After a ruined Christmas dinner due to their father's girlfriend's inability to cook, they wind up all having dinner together with Mother.
10	10	"Puppy Love"	Mark Warren	Bill Richmond & Gene Perret	December 30, 1976
Raj is tutoring Patrice Williams in exchange for one of the puppies that her dog Susie is soon to have. However, confusion and chaos erupts in the Thomas household when Dee overhears a conversation among the boys which leads her to believe Raj had gotten Patrice pregnant.
11	11	"The Maid Did It"	Mark Warren	Marty Farrell	January 6, 1977
Mama is fired from her job as a maid after her boss, Mrs. Turner, falsely accuses her of stealing a diamond ring, but justice prevails when Raj discovers that Mr. Turner is using the ring to fund his gambling.
12	12	"The Incomplete Shakespeare"	Dick Harwood	Mort Scharfman	January 13, 1977
Raj is trying to break into the writing business.
13	13	"The Hospital Stay"	Mark Warren	Alan Eisenstock & Larry Mintz	January 20, 1977
Dee helps a dying man (Mel Stewart) reunite with his estranged daughter (Hope Clarke) who married a white man. It is revealed the man once played baseball in the Negro leagues. The nurse is played by Judy Pace, the wife of baseball great Curt Flood.
14	14	"The Sunday Father"	Mark Warren	Bob Illes & James R. Stein	January 27, 1977
After being "expelled" (actually suspended) from school for bad behavior in class, Raj soft-soaps his father into coming to the school for the conference instead of his mother, because he knows his father cannot punish him.
15	15	"The Firing Squad"	Mark Warren	Rick Mittleman	February 10, 1977
Shirley gets fired for arguing with business associate (David Downing) of her boss Rob. As a result, everyone boycotts the soda shop.
16	16	"The Boarder"	Mark Warren	Alan Eisenstock & Larry Mintz	February 17, 1977
When the Thomas family has financial problems, Raj and Dee's father moves in and pays rent to help out, pretending not to know their plight.
17	17	"Dwayne's Dilemma"	Dick Harwood	Jerry Ross	February 24, 1977
Dwayne is dating a girl who recently broke up with an abusive boyfriend.
18	18	"The Tickets"	Mark Warren	Richard Baer	March 3, 1977
Raj has two tickets for a Stevie Wonder concert, but wants to take both Dwayne and Rerun, so they try to scalp the tickets and they get arrested.
19	19	"What's Wrong with Raj?"	Mark Warren	Gene Farmer	March 10, 1977
Dee is always snooping in Raj's journal; so in order to teach Dee a lesson, Mama and Raj trick her into thinking that Raj is really sick when he fakes an illness involving memory loss.
20	20	"Nice Guys Finish Last"	Mark Warren	Carol Gary	March 24, 1977
Dee allows her pen pal from prison to visit thinking she was paroled, but she is actually still a fugitive, and she and her boyfriend take Dee hostage. Guest Star: Vernee Watson-Johnson as Judy Crane
21	21	"From Here to Maternity"	Mark Warren	Rick Mittleman	March 31, 1977
Shirley's sister (Chip Fields) comes to visit, unmarried and six months pregnant.

=== Season 2 (1977–78) ===
No. overall	No. in season	Title	Directed by	Written by	Original release date
22	1	"Rerun Gets Married"	Mark Warren	Bruce Howard	September 22, 1977
Rerun attempts to marry an illegal alien (Irene Cara) so she can stay in the country. Note: Shirley Hemphill (Shirley) becomes a regular cast member.
23	2	"It's All in Your Head"	Mark Warren	Alan Eisenstock & Larry Mintz	September 29, 1977
Dee's visit to a school psychologist (Tim Reid) for a friend's problem is misinterpreted, and Dee's family is suddenly extremely nice to her. She then takes advantage, and when they find out the truth, Mama informs Dee that she has a surprise for her and then tricks her into doing chores before the surprise is revealed to be punishment.
24	3	"Trial and Error"	Lee Bernhardi	Rick Mittleman	October 6, 1977
Roger wrecks his work bicycle after running into a moving car. Note: Danielle Spencer (Dee) does not appear in this episode.
25	4	"Raj Goes to Press"	Mark Warren	David Pollock	October 13, 1977
After Miss Collins rejects Roger's school newspaper article that denounces surprise tests, Roger resigns and he, Dwayne, and Rerun begin an "underground" newspaper of their own. Coincidentally, while working on their new project, Dwayne inadvertently notices a surprise test in Miss Collins' desk drawer while getting a stapler for their newspaper. The guys then write an article revealing when the surprise test is going to be.
26	5	"Nothing Personal"	Mark Warren	Alan Eisenstock & Larry Mintz	October 20, 1977
Shirley is hired for a highly skilled professional job only because she is black. Note: Mabel King (Mama) does not appear in this episode.
27	6	"If I'm Elected"	Lee Bernhardi	Winston Moss	October 27, 1977
Dwayne is helping his father campaign for election to city councilman. Meanwhile, he gets very upset when his uncle is suddenly fired as campaign manager. Note: Ernest Thomas (Raj) and Fred Berry (Rerun) do not appear. This is due to a walkout over a contract dispute, leaving Haywood Nelson (Dwayne) to largely carry the episode, with Shirley Hemphill (Shirley) taking a much more prominent role. In addition, Danielle Spencer (Dee) does not appear in this episode, due to injuries sustained in an automobile accident on September 7, 1977.
28	7	"The Play's the Big Thing"	Ron Richards	Saul Turteltaub & Bernie Orenstein	November 3, 1977
Roger is in a dilemma when, out of pity, he uses Rerun as the main character in a skit Roger wrote for their theatre arts class when their teacher's friend, a TV producer whom Roger tries to impress with his skit, visits to see the class projects. As expected, with Rerun cast as the main character, the presentation of the skit turns into disaster.
29	8	"Give Me Odds"	Mark Warren	Alan Eisenstock & Larry Mintz	November 10, 1977
Dwayne is in a lucky streak with a "system" he came up with to make bets on football games. This leads Rerun to pass along Dwayne's tips to his brother-in-law Ike, a compulsive gambler, who bets $500 (his and his wife's vacation money) on a game in which Dwayne picks the underdog to win. It is only after the bet is locked in that everyone discovers just what kind of wacky system Dwayne uses. Note: Mabel King (Mama) does not appear in this episode.
30	9	"Bill Gets Married"	Dick Harwood	Carol Gary	November 17, 1977
Bill has become serious with his latest girlfriend and announces that they plan on getting married. Almost everyone is happy for the couple, including Mama who even lets them have the ceremony in her house. However, it is Dee who refuses to accept their marriage and refuses to be the flower girl in the wedding.
31	10	"Mama, the School Girl"	Mark Warren	Barbara Berkowitz	November 24, 1977
Mama takes a night history course at Roger's school and even gets his teacher, Miss Collins. A classmate takes an instant liking to Mama and she falls head over heels for him, unaware that he is only using her to write his term paper for him. Note: Shirley Hemphill (Shirley) does not appear in this episode.
32	11	"One Strike and You're Out"	Mark Warren	Rick Mittleman	December 8, 1977
Rerun being fired from the supermarket is the last straw for Raj, who rallies the rest of the workers to take some action against their boss Mr. Pronson. However, when the staff goes on strike, Raj finds himself in a jam, since Mama has lost her job and the family now has no source of income.
33	12	"The Testimonial"	Mark Warren	Nicholas DeMarco	December 15, 1977
Miss Collins is being honored for 25 years of teaching and this prompts Raj to play a trick on her after she gives him detention for being tardy. However, he soon finds his trick is totally inappropriate and sets out to right his wrong.
34	13	"Black and White Blues"	Mark Warren	Story by : Bill Richmond & Gene Perret; Teleplay by : William Bickley, Jr.	December 22, 1977
While watching a football game at the Thomas house, their black-and-white TV set (supposedly) malfunctions and Rerun suggests that they "borrow" a new color television set that is being offered as a prize at a church raffle. However, once they get the TV set to the Thomas' house, Rerun and Dwayne accidentally drop it. When that set fails, they think they broke it–until Dee tries to vacuum the floor and the vacuum keeps malfunctioning. It turns out that the wall outlet is defective, and Dee goes to the church raffle to try to inform Roger that the television is not broken, but Roger does not listen to her.
35	14	"Going, Going, Gong"	Mark Warren	Alan Eisenstock & Larry Mintz	January 5, 1978
Raj has become the manager of a kid's song and dance group, and believes that they are so good that they may have a chance to get on The Gong Show. However, once at tryouts, Raj discovers he has some competition from Rerun. Note: Kene Holliday, Wolfman Jack, and Barbara Rhoades guest star as Gong Show judges.
36	15	"Dee's First Date"	Mark Warren	Joseph Neustein	January 21, 1978
Dee is going out on her first date with a boy whose sister Raj has made into the object of his affection. His plan is to buddy up to Dee's boyfriend to get close to his sister. However, he quickly finds he has another thing coming. It also turns out that Dee's boyfriend is a compulsive TV watcher who makes up tragic stories lifted from a TV show he had just watched.
37	16	"Doobie or Not Doobie (Part 1)"	Mark Warren	Sally Wade	January 28, 1978
The Doobie Brothers are set to put on a concert at the guys' high school (which is also portrayed as the Doobies' alma mater), and Roger and Dwayne have Rerun get the tickets. However, by the time Rerun makes his way to the ticket booth, they are sold out. Later, two shady characters offer Rerun free tickets for front-row seats if he just tape-records the concert. It is only later that Rerun learns that they are bootleggers and they threaten Rerun, Roger, and Dwayne if they do not comply.
38	17	"Doobie or Not Doobie (Part 2)"	Mark Warren	Sally Wade	February 4, 1978
The bootleggers force the guys into tape recording the concert; but while everyone is dancing and jumping around, the tape recorder falls out from under Rerun's coat--right in full view of the Doobies. After some explanations, the guys and the Doobies set up a trap to catch the bootleggers. Note: Mabel King (Mama) does not appear in this episode.
39	18	"Rerun Sees the Light"	Mark Warren	Thad Mumford	February 11, 1978
Rerun encounters a strange woman on the street who goes by the name of Life-Is-Love and she lures him into attending one of her cult gatherings. Rerun enjoys his new-found faith and how it makes him feel, but Dwayne and Raj are a bit leery about a group that worships a head of lettuce named Ralph.
40	19	"Raj and the Older Woman"	Mark Warren	Sally Wade	February 18, 1978
When Raj goes down to a photographer to get his yearbook picture taken, he is instantly smitten with a beautiful model. Raj lies about his age and says he is 21 and a movie star, and the girl is instantly taken by him. That is, until she learns the truth. Note: Shirley Hemphill (Shirley) does not appear in this episode.
41	20	"Diplomatic Immunity"	Mark Warren	Ted Bergman	February 25, 1978
Rerun borrows a car so the guys can get to a Lakers game, but after the game Rerun becomes the victim of a hit-and-run driver. Dee surprises everyone by coming forward with news that she was a witness and saw the driver, who turns out to be the son of a foreign diplomat.
42	21	"Shirley Is A Mother"	Mark Warren	Saul Turteltaub & Bernie Orenstein	April 13, 1978
With Mama out of town, Raj has Shirley babysit Dee, whose conversation with Shirley has Shirley thinking about her past. Meanwhile, Raj and Rerun's graduation is approaching, but right at the last minute Rerun gets himself in trouble by cheating on a final exam–with help from Raj. Shirley, since she's filling in for Mama, is notified by the school of the guys' offense, which prompts her to give Rerun some guidance and ask Mrs. Collins to let Rerun retake the exam, which he passes, thereby allowing him to graduate. Note: Mabel King (Mama) does not appear in this episode.
43	22	"The Apartment"	Mark Warren	Thad Mumford	May 11, 1978
It's graduation day, and Raj gives a speech riddled with hints to Mama about his plans on moving into an apartment with Rerun, but after mulling over the proposition, Mama finally agrees to let him move out. However, Rerun and Raj quickly find themselves with little privacy when Mama, out of worry, constantly visits to see that everything is fine. Note: This is Mabel King's last episode as a cast member. For the third season, her character of Mrs. Thomas (Mama) would be written out of the series, as having moved in with an ill relative in Arizona (although she is mentioned off-screen several times in Season 3). Shirley then moves into the Thomas house as a boarder, and Dee's guardian.

=== Season 3 (1978–79) ===
No. overall	No. in season	Title	Directed by	Written by	Original release date
44	1	"Disco Dollar Disaster"	Mark Warren	Deborah Pastoria	September 21, 1978
A dance contest has Rerun scrambling to get enough money for the entrance fee and ending up having people buying shares in his prospective winnings. However, he finds himself facing stiff competition from a notorious disco dancer, Danny Domino, and the prospect of two thugs giving him trouble if he does not win.
45	2	"Shirley's Boyfriend"	Mark Warren	Tom Moore & Jeremy Stevens	September 28, 1978
Raj, Rerun and Dwayne learn how lonely Shirley's life is and decide that the best thing for her is a blind date with Ed Roberts, a friend of Roger and Dee's father. Things start getting serious between Shirley and Ed–until Dee learns that Ed is married.
46	3	"Basketball Brain"	Mark Warren	Ted Bergman	October 12, 1978
Raj is coerced into tutoring a basketball star and gets plenty of encouragement, thanks to a generous salary for doing so. However, Raj finds himself in trouble with tutoring Dee and Dwayne as well, and he has little time to do his own studying.
47	4	"The Creep Detective"	Mark Warren	Ted Bergman	November 2, 1978
Rerun and Raj are mistakenly arrested after Rerun unknowingly stores stolen goods in which their new neighbor, Detective Earl Barnett, inadvertently sees. Dee and Little Earl (Detective Barnett's son) then scheme to clear the guys and nab the real crooks.
48	5	"Shirley's Cookies"	Mark Warren	Ken Hecht	November 9, 1978
Shirley brings some homemade cookies into Rob's Place as a gift for Rerun and the guys, and they are so taken with how good they are that they suggest that she try selling them at Rob's. She decides to try it, but soon finds that her small business venture has attracted the likes of a con man who talks her into a long-term contract that is binding.
49	6	"The Landlady"	Mark Warren	Gerald Gardner & Dee Caruso	November 16, 1978
The rent is due for Raj and Rerun's apartment but they are short since Raj has not been able to find a job. When the landlady stops by to collect the rent, she takes Raj aside and tells him not to worry and then proceeds to give Raj signals that convince him that she's interested in him romantically. Raj soon begins acting more mature, since she's in her 30s and he's 19.
50	7	"Charge"	Mark Warren	Eric Lee Bowers	November 23, 1978
Rerun goes on a spending spree with a credit card he had obtained, buying everything in sight from new appliances and electronics to new furniture. He soon applies for more credit cards and continues to spend freely, unaware of the mountain of debt he is soon to incur. But he eventually realizes the debt he is getting into and takes out a loan with a local finance company to defray the debt, putting his and Roger's furniture and other belongings up as collateral. But when Rerun defaults on his loan payments, his and Roger's property gets repossessed. In order to make good on his debt and reclaim his and Roger's property, Rerun must sell everything he bought with the credit cards.
51	8	"Raj Moves Out"	Mark Warren	Marty Brill & Barry Meadow	November 30, 1978
Raj's study date with an attractive girl, Jean, goes awry thanks to Rerun's annoying presence. Thus, it is no surprise when Raj jumps at the chance to move in with Jean to get away from Rerun. However, Dee makes a shocking discovery; Jean has a distinct motive for the roommate proposal.
52	9	"No Clothes Make the Man"	Mark Warren	Sally Wade	December 14, 1978
Raj needs a job and gets one selling meat, but when he learns the company is a fraud and has been busted by the FBI, he begins searching for another one. He finally finds one that pays $35 an hour but involves posing nude for an art class.
53	10	"Positive Identification"	Bill Foster	Bill Box & Dick Westerschulte	December 21, 1978
The Christmas spirit has touched everyone except for a burglar who has just robbed Rerun and Raj's apartment. As he is getting away, Raj and Rerun inadvertently help him, leaving them with only a glimpse. Thus, when they are asked to pick the robber out of a line-up, Raj and Rerun just are not positive if they identified the right guy.
54	11	"Making Out"	Mark Warren	Joanne Pagliaro	January 11, 1979
Raj and Rerun each have a girl in their lives—April and Cindy—and finding free time to spend alone in the apartment is a challenge. Soon, it becomes a bet to see how far each one can go with each girl. Rerun ends up striking out with both of them, but Raj hits pay dirt with April, who happens to be the girl Rerun has his heart set on.
55	12	"Dee, the Cheerleader"	Mark Warren	Sally Wade	January 25, 1979
Dee has her heart set on joining the cheerleading squad, and while preparing she helps out her friend Julie who also want to be on the squad. With Dee being better than her, Julie does not think she has a chance; however, everyone is in for a shock when Julie is picked and Dee is not. Note: Fred Berry (Rerun) does not appear in this episode.
56	13	"A Present for Dee"	Lee Bernhardi	Sally Wade	February 9, 1979
Dee's 14th birthday has Raj and the gang preparing a surprise birthday party. Dee quickly gets word of it, but is not without a surprise thanks to Little Earl's birthday gift. The atrocious necklace he gave her turns out to be stolen, and Dee is accused of shoplifting when she tries to exchange it.
57	14	"Dwayne's Dream"	Mark Warren	Joanne Pagliaro	February 16, 1979
Dwayne gets a new job in concessions at ball games, and the owner wants him to handle all of the games all over town. Dwayne quickly realizes the job could turn into a full-time employment and considers quitting school. However, he has serious doubts thanks to a talk from Raj and Rerun. This all leads to Dwayne having a crazy dream about the future.
58	15	"Shirley's Fired"	Danny Simon	Levi Taylor & David Tyree	February 23, 1979
Shirley has decided to ask Rob for a raise and he is shocked, but he also has a shock for her; he has decided to hire an additional waitress, Liz. However, her constant clumsiness gets on Shirley's nerves so much that she quits. Later, Shirley witnesses Liz skimming the till.
59	16	"Food Poisoning"	Mark Warren	Story by : Bruce Kalish & Philip John Taylor; Teleplay by : Tom Moore & Jeremy Stevens	March 2, 1979
Rerun has one of Rob's hamburgers and suddenly becomes ill. He is taken to the hospital and it is assumed that he has food poisoning. Suddenly, Rob finds himself with no business since no one wants to take a chance eating his food. However, Rob has bigger problems on his hands when a greedy Rerun decides to sue Rob's place for $100,000. It turns out that Rerun does not have food poisoning, but appendicitis.
60	17	"The Eviction"	Lee Bernhardi	Story by : Cheryl Pelt; Teleplay by : Joanne Pagliaro	March 9, 1979
Rerun and Raj have gotten a new landlord and he has been totally neglecting all of the repairs that are needed in the apartments. Fed up, Rerun calls a tenants' meeting and Raj is roped into handing the landlord a list of demands. However, things do not go quite as planned and the landlord evicts Raj and Rerun, which forces them to move into the Thomas household with Dee and Shirley.
61	18	"The Thomas Treasure"	Joseph L. Scanlan	Bill Box & Dick Westerschulte	March 16, 1979
After reading an article in a newspaper, Raj learns that Mama's house was once used as a hideout by some bank robbers and that they may have hidden some loot somewhere in it. This leads him, Rerun, Dee, Dwayne and Shirley on a mad search for the money. Meanwhile, they are all unaware the bank robbers are plotting to come back to claim their money.
62	19	"The Last Page"	Mary Hardwick	Sally Wade	March 31, 1979
The gang fantasizes about being television characters from famous ABC shows, such as Happy Days, Three's Company and Mork & Mindy.
63	20	"First Class Coach"	Lee Bernhardi	Tom Moore & Jeremy Stevens	April 7, 1979
Big Earl has been coaching Little Earl's basketball team and has been pushing the kids constantly to do their best, so when Big Earl gets an undercover assignment he must get a temporary coach and finds one in Dwayne. However, Dwayne proves to be the exact opposite of Big Earl and suddenly the team is finding themselves winning a game for a change. This leads the team to decide whether or not to keep Big Earl. Note: Shirley Hemphill (Shirley) does not appear in this episode.
64	21	"Dwayne's Debate"	Mark Warren	Sally Wade	April 21, 1979
When another classmate drops out of a high school campaign, two attractive girls talk Dwayne into running. When the news reaches his dad's ears, Dwayne cannot even get a word in to tell him he does not want to run, but everyone convinces him that he would be perfect. However, the worst is yet to come, when Dwayne learns that there will be a debate between him and the other candidate. Note: Fred Berry (Rerun) does not appear in this episode.
65	22	"The Benefit Show"	Mark Warren	Joanne Pagliaro	April 28, 1979
A local teen center is in serious financial trouble and the gang tries to come up with a way to save it. They finally decide to put on a benefit show, and Rerun has someone in mind who will be sure to attract attention: Sammy Davis, Jr. Rerun does his best to get a hold of Sammy, but soon realizes he must announce that Sammy will not be coming to the benefit. Note: This is the series' finale. The series' third season ranked 28th in the Nielsen ratings (tying with NFL Monday Night Football). Despite solid viewership, ABC decided not to renew the series for a fourth season due to contract disputes involving Fred Berry, Haywood Nelson, and Ernest Thomas.

== Home releases ==
DVD box set	Company	Release date
What's Happening!!: The Complete First Season	Columbia TriStar Home Entertainment	February 3, 2004
What's Happening!!: The Complete Second Season	Columbia TriStar Home Entertainment	October 5, 2004
What's Happening!!: The Complete Third Season	Sony Pictures Home Entertainment	August 23, 2005
What's Happening: The Complete Series	Sony Pictures Home Entertainment	June 10, 2008
