= Fritzi Burr =

American actress (1924–2003)

- Burr on Sanford and Son in 1976
- Born: May 31, 1924; Philadelphia, Pennsylvania, U.S.
- Died: January 17, 2003 (aged 78); Fort Myers, Florida, U.S.
- Other name: Freda Steinberg
- Occupations: Actress, comedienne
- Years active: 1953–1997
- Spouse(s): Aaron Heyman, 1990-1995, his death

Fritzi Burr (May 31, 1924 – January 17, 2003) was an American character actress who was notable for her television roles, including as Miss Collins on the sitcom What's Happening!!, and as various comedic foils to Fred Sanford on the sitcom Sanford and Son. She was the sister-in-law of Sanford and Son and What's Happening!! producer Saul Turteltaub.

== Biography ==
Burr was born Freda Berr in Philadelphia on May 31, 1924, to Pauline Berr (née Devore) and David Berr. Both of her parents were Russian Jews, and their families came from the same city, Berdichev. Her father's original last name, "Berdichevsky", before it was shortened to "Berr", is also derived from the name of their native town. Her parents divorced when she was young, and her mother took her to live with her parents, Harry and Rose Devore.

A few years later, her mother would remarry and have two more daughters, Shirley and Thelma, by her second husband, Benjamin Steinberg. In the late 1930s, the family moved from Philadelphia to Newark, New Jersey, where Freda spent her formative years in close proximity to the New York stage scene. Eventually, her stepfather formally adopted her, at which time she became officially known as Freda Steinberg, keeping a slightly modified "Burr" as her stage name.

Burr performed in small theaters and in skits with the vaudeville comedy team Smith and Dale. By the late 1950s, she was working on Broadway, appearing in I Can Get It for You Wholesale, the show in which Barbra Streisand first gained national attention. In the mid-1960s, Burr replaced Kaye Medford as the mother of Fanny Brice (played by Streisand) in Funny Girl. Her other Broadway credits include portraying Sylvia Goldman in The Family Way in 1965.

Burr worked regularly in small theaters and dinner theaters, as well as in touring companies of musicals such as Fiddler on the Roof, in which she played, at different times, Yente and Tevye's long-suffering wife, Golde. After moving to Hollywood, she found steady work as a character actress in movies and on television.

Burr appeared in the movies How Do I Love Thee? (1970), Frasier, The Senusous Lion (1973), Chinatown (1974), The New, Original Wonder Woman (1975), Mary Jane Harper Cried Last Night (1977) and 3 Ninjas (1992). Her television appearances include The Rockford Files (6 different roles in 6 episodes), What's Happening! (as high school teacher Miss Collins in 7 episodes), Starsky & Hutch, Quincy, M.E.,The Nanny, Melrose Place, Hunter, The Golden Girls, The Incredible Hulk, Sanford and Son, (10 episodes), Seinfeld, Friends and The Odd Couple.

== Personal life and death ==
Burr was married to Aaron Heyman until his death in 1995. Burr died in Fort Myers, Florida, of natural causes on January 17, 2003, age 78.

== Filmography ==
=== Television ===
- 1967, N.Y.P.D. (1 episode) as Landlady
- 1970, That Girl (1 episode) as Laura
- 1973, A Touch of Grace (1 episode) as Mrs. Sherman
- 1973, The New Dick Van Dyke Show (1 episode) as Mrs. Davis
- 1973 – 1974, Love, American Style (2 episodes) as Mabel/The Moderator
- 1974 – 1975, The Odd Couple (2 episodes) as Angry Woman/Mrs. Perkins
- 1974 – 1977, Sanford and Son (10 episodes) as various
- 1975, The ABC Afternoon Playbreak (1 episode) as Florence Darwin
- 1975, Baretta (1 episode) as Mrs. Schwartz
- 1975, The Rookies (1 episode) as Apartment House Manager
- 1975, Wonder Woman (1 episode) as Saleslady
- 1975 – 1979, The Rockford Files (6 episodes) as various
- 1976, One Day at a Time (1 episode) as Ginny
- 1976, Harry O (1 episode) as Apartment Manager
- 1976, Starsky and Hutch (1 episode) as Mrs. Haberman
- 1976, Holmes & Yoyo (1 episode) as Mrs. Buchanan
- 1976, Police Woman (1 episode) as Landlady
- 1977, Sanford Arms (1 episode) as Secretary
- 1977 – 1979, What's Happening!! (7 episodes) as Miss Collins
- 1979, Delta House (1 episode) as Gretl Kemp
- 1979, Detective School (2 episodes) as Madame Duchamp
- 1979, The Incredible Hulk (2 episodes) as Rose Brown/Gladys
- 1979 – 1982, Quincy M.E. (3 episodes) as Dr. Finkel/Maybelle/Doreen
- 1980, One in a Million (1 episode) as Nurse
- 1981, Strike Force (1 episode) as Mrs. Greenstreet
- 1982, One of the Boys (1 episode) as The Bank Manager
- 1982, Maggie (1 episode) as Mrs. Spaulding
- 1983, The Facts of Life (1 episode) as Mrs. Waldman
- 1985, Crazy Like a Fox (1 episode) as Mabel
- 1985, Days of our Lives (4 episodes) as Beulah Boden
- 1986, Divorce Court (1 episode) as Marianne Walker
- 1986, You Again? (2 episodes) as Mabel
- 1987, Throb (1 episode) as Makler
- 1988, The Golden Girls (1 episode) as Ruth
- 1988, My Sister Sam (1 episode) as Checker
- 1989, Moonlighting (1 episode) as Lenora Viola
- 1989, Chicken Soup (1 episode) as Lillian
- 1991, Hunter (1 episode) as Ida Green
- 1991, Dream On (1 episode) as Waitress
- 1992, Sisters (1 episode) as Mrs. Visconti
- 1993, Seinfeld (1 episode) as Mah-Jongg Lady
- 1993, The Nanny (1 episode) as Woman at the Movie
- 1995, Platypus Man (1 episode) as Marjorie McAllister
- 1995 – 1996, Friends (3 episodes) as Mrs. Weinberg/Woman (uncredited)/Ms. Tedlock
- 1997, Mad About You (1 episode) as Klarik's Customer

=== Film ===
- How Do I Love Thee? (1970) as Mrs. Gromulka
- Chinatown (1974) as Mulwray's Secretary
- The New, Original Wonder Woman (1975) as Saleslady
- Cover Girls (1977) as Seamstress #1
- Mary Jane Harper Cried Last Night (1977) as Nancy West
- Like Normal People (1979) as Mrs. Peterson
- The Star Chamber (1983) as Judge Alice McCardle (uncredited)
- Trabbi Goes to Hollywood (1991) as Mrs. Peugeot
- 3 Ninjas (1992) as Babysitter
