= Larry Clark (filmmaker, born 1948) =

American film director

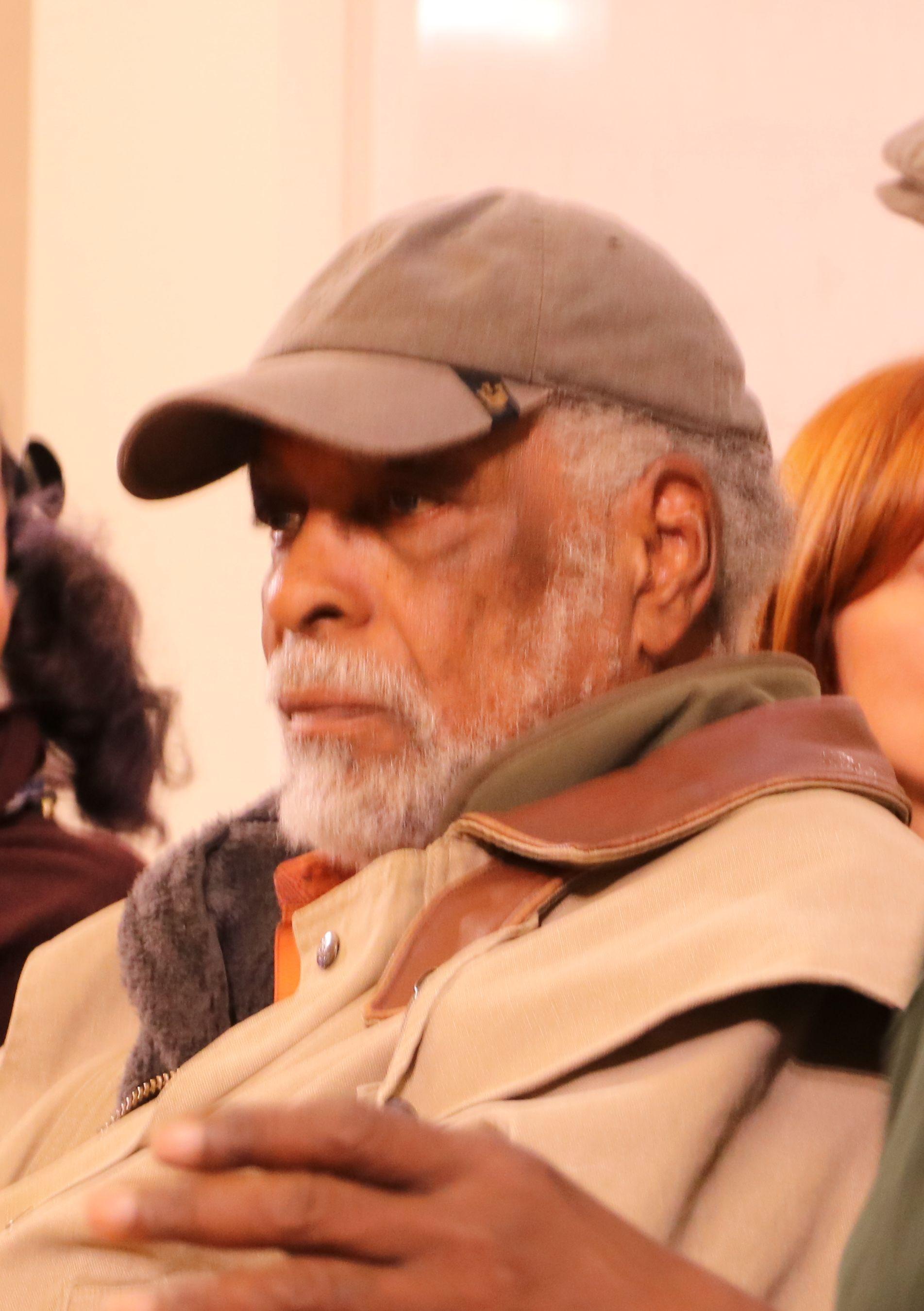
- Clark in 2019
- Born: January 19, 1948 (age 78)
- Education: UCLA
- Occupation: Filmmaker
- Employer: San Francisco State University
- Notable work: Passing Through; Cutting Horse

Larry Clark (born January 19, 1948) is an American filmmaker, known as one of the leading directors of the L.A. Rebellion (also known as the Los Angeles School of Black Filmmakers). He directed the feature films Passing Through (1977) and Cutting Horse (2002). He is also a film professor in the Cinema Department at San Francisco State University.

== Biography ==
A native of Cleveland, Ohio, Clark received a bachelor's degree at Miami University, prior to arriving at UCLA, where he majored in film. While a student at UCLA, Clark taught film workshops at the Performing Arts Society of Los Angeles (PASLA), under the guidance of Vantile Whitfield.

=== Early career ===
Clark was a cinematographer for 1972's Wattstax and his recollections of the making of the film are included on a commentary track of the 2004 special-edition DVD of the restored film. Several crew and cast members are on the track, including Al Bell, president of Stax Records and producer of the film, and director Mel Stuart.

Passing Through served as Clark's master's thesis film at UCLA. The film stars Nathaniel Taylor (best known for playing Rollo on the hit television series, Sanford and Son) and veteran actor Clarence Muse. Clark co-wrote the screenplay with actor Ted Lange. Matthew Duersten of the LA Weekly described the film as a "potent underground L.A. neorealist treatise" that "is raw, gritty, surreal and, at times, terrifying."

== Filmography ==
- Tamu, 1970, 10 min., Director 16mm
- As Above So Below, 1973, Director, 55 min.
- Wattstax, 1974, Co-Cinematographer, feature documentary
- Passing Through, 1977, Director/writer, 104 min., 16mm
- Cutting Horse, 2001, Director/writer, 124 min., 35mm

== Awards and recognition ==
- Special Jury Prize, Locarno International Film Festival
- Festival International du Film d’Amiens, France
- Cannes International Film Festival (special event)
- The Whitney Museum of American Art, New York
- Museum of Modern Art, New York City
- Brooklyn Academy of Music
- Festival of Pan African Cinema (FESPACO), Ouagadougou, Burkina Faso
- Moscow Film Festival (information section)
- Deauville Film Festival, France
- San Francisco Museum of Modern Art
- Los Angeles County Art Museum
- Pesaro International Film Festival, Pesaro Italy
- Festival Internazionale Cinema Giovani, Torino Italy
- The Chicago Film Center
- Auckland Film Festival, New Zealand
- Perth International Film Festival, Australia
