= Grady (American TV series) =

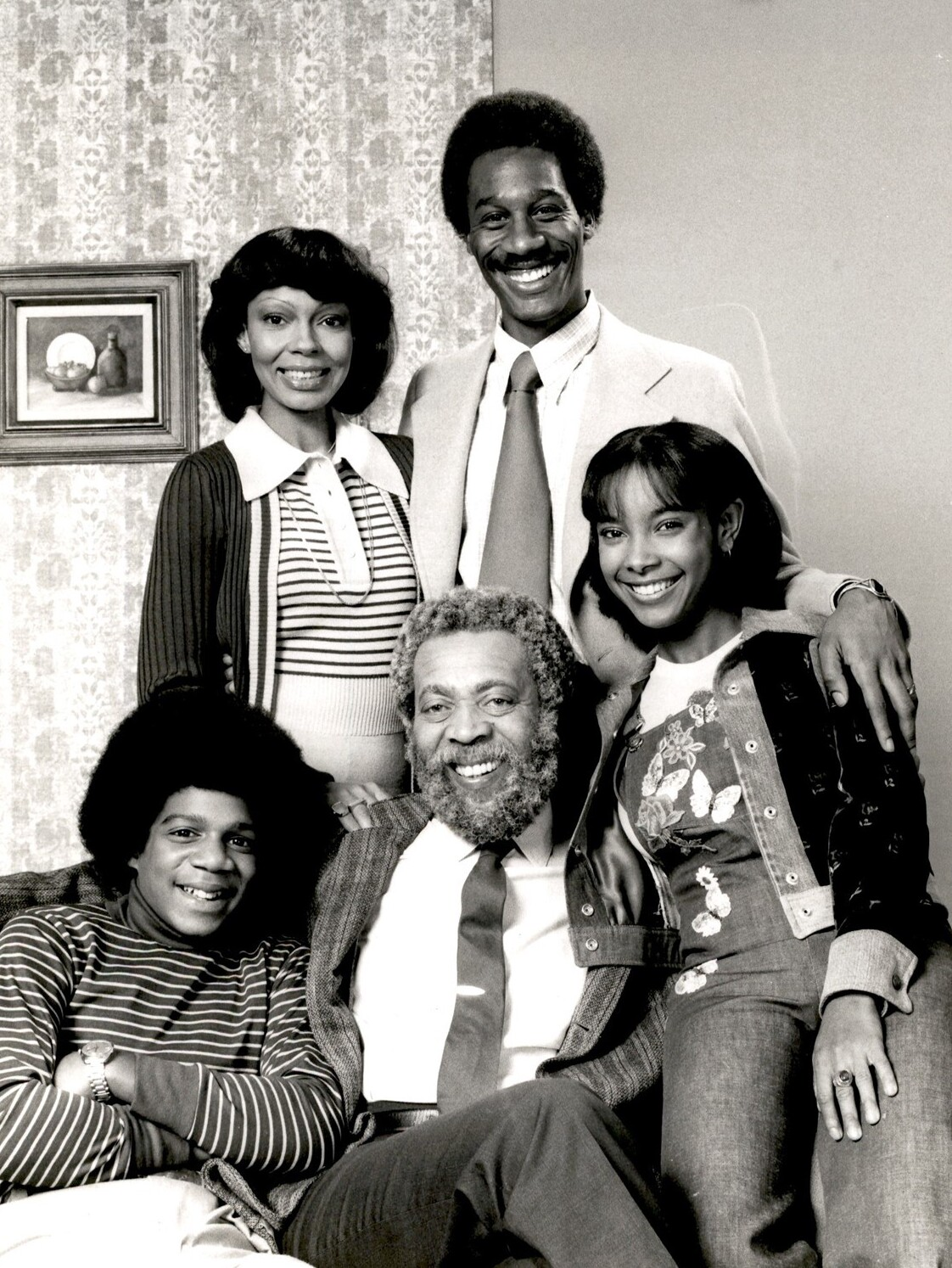
- The cast of series
- Developed by: Redd Foxx; Saul Turteltaub; Bernie Orenstein
- Starring: Whitman Mayo; Carole Cole; Joe Morton; Rosanne Katon; Haywood Nelson; Jack Fletcher
- Opening theme: John Addison
- Country of origin: United States
- Original language: English
- No. of seasons: 1
- No. of episodes: 10

Production
- Running time: 30 min.
- Production company: Bud Yorkin Productions

Original release
- Network: NBC
- Release: December 4, 1975 – March 4, 1976

Related
- Sanford and Son; Sanford Arms; Sanford

Grady is an American sitcom and a spin-off of Sanford and Son that aired on NBC from December 4, 1975, to March 4, 1976. Whitman Mayo reprises his role as Fred Sanford's widower friend Grady Wilson, who leaves Watts to move in with his daughter and her family in Westwood. Executive producer Norman Lear served as a consultant to the show.

The series never found a solid audience, and was canceled after ten episodes. Whitman Mayo returned to Sanford and Son and would go on to star in the spinoff series Sanford Arms.

Grady was Bud Yorkin's first series after he ended his partnership with Norman Lear and Tandem Productions. Five months, after the cancelation of the series, Haywood Nelson would later star in What's Happening!!, from the same production company, which proved to be more successful.

== Cast ==
- Whitman Mayo as Grady Wilson
- Carole Cole as Ellie Wilson Marshall, Grady's daughter
- Joe Morton as Hal Marshall, Grady's son-in-law
- Rosanne Katon as Laurie Marshall, Grady's granddaughter
- Haywood Nelson as Haywood Marshall, Grady's grandson
- Jack Fletcher as Mr. Pratt

Redd Foxx made a special guest appearance as Fred Sanford in the first episode.

== Episodes ==
No.	Title	Directed by	Written by	Original release date
1	"Be It Ever So Humble"	Burt Brinckerhoff	Art Baer & Ben Joelson	December 4, 1975
Grady says goodbye to Fred. Later, Fred pays Grady a visit, helping him out by bringing him his luggage.
2	"The Camel Force"	Burt Brinckerhoff	Saul Turteltaub & Bernie Orenstein	December 11, 1975
Grady is tired of riding the bus and decides that he wants to learn how to drive. His family, however, has concerns. After getting his license, he overhears his family talking about their concerns. To make sure they don't worry, he tells them he didn't take the driving test.
3	"Merry Birthday, Happy Xmas"	Bud Yorkin	Saul Turteltaub & Bernie Orenstein	December 18, 1975
While Ellie greets the guests for Grady's surprise birthday party, Hal keeps the guest of honor occupied at a local bar.
4	"Grady's Night In"	Burt Brinckerhoff	Story by : Stan Burns & Mike Marmer; Teleplay by : Saul Turteltaub & Bernie Orenstein	December 25, 1975
Grady turns sleuth to track down the thief who stole two rolls of quarters from the Grady kitchen.
5	"Night School"	Burt Brinckerhoff	Story by : Bruce Kane; Teleplay by : Ron Friedman	January 8, 1976
Hal has a new student in his American history class: his father-in-law Grady.
6	"The Meterman"	Leo Orenstein	Bill Taub	January 22, 1976
Grady's scheme of feeding expired parking meters, then asking the car owners for reimbursement, earns him unwanted attention in the news.
7	"The Strike"	Gerren Keith	Jerry Ross	January 29, 1976
Hal and his fellow teachers vote to go on strike.
8	"Bureaucracy"	Gerren Keith	Howard Leeds	February 12, 1976
Grady takes on the government after he fails to receive several social security checks.
9	"Grady Takes a Wife"	Gerren Keith	Simon Muntner	March 4, 1976
Ellie dreams that Grady marries a go-go dancer.
10	"The Weekend"	Leo Orenstein	Saul Turteltaub & Bernie Orenstein	March 11, 1976
Hal and Ellie have a chance for a second honeymoon after Grady takes the kids away for the weekend.

== Broadcast ==
The pilot episode was repackaged as an episode of Sanford and Son and is a part of its syndication package. An episode of this series aired on TV Land during a Norman Lear tribute in 2003. As of 2026, the series is streaming on Tubi .

== Home media ==
On July 12, 2016, Sony Pictures Entertainment released The Best of Grady on DVD in Region 1 as a manufacture on demand release. It has every episode excluding episode #3 "Merry Birthday, Happy Christmas". However, a two disc DVD version with all 10 episodes of Grady uncut, titled Grady: The Complete Series would at one be released as well.
