= Richard Paul =

American actor (1940–1998)

- Publicity photograph
- Born: June 6, 1940; Los Angeles, California, U.S.
- Died: December 25, 1998 (aged 58); Los Angeles, California, U.S.
- Education: Claremont Men's College (BA); California State University, Los Angeles (MA); University of Arizona (no degree)
- Occupation: Actor
- Years active: 1973–1997
- Spouse: Patty Oestereich (m. 1968)

Richard Paul (June 6, 1940 – December 25, 1998) was an American television and film actor. In addition to starring in the 1970s television sitcom Carter Country, he had recurring roles on the later series Murder, She Wrote and Full House. He portrayed Jerry Falwell Sr. in two separate productions after having played a character based on Falwell for an episode of WKRP in Cincinnati.

== Early life ==
Paul was born in Los Angeles and earned a Bachelor of Arts degree in public affairs from Claremont Men's College and a Master of Arts degree in psychology from California State University, Los Angeles. He was nearing completion of a Ph.D. in clinical psychology from the University of Arizona in Tucson when he abandoned his career as a therapist to become a full-time performer.

== Career ==
From 1977 to 1979, Paul played Mayor Teddy Burnside in Carter Country. His famous catchphrase was "Handle it, Roy, handle it!".

He costarred in the ABC comedy One in a Million, which aired for one season in 1980, and on an episode of M*A*S*H as Capt. Bill Bainbridge.

Paul was also a frequent panelist on Match Game from 1978 to 1982, and later played the recurring character of Cabot Cove mayor Sam Booth in Murder, She Wrote. During the late 1980s and early 1990s, he also had a recurring role as television station manager Mr. Strowbridge on Full House.

In the 1981 WKRP in Cincinnati episode "Clean Up Radio Everywhere", Paul played Rev. Bob Halyers, a character inspired by evangelist Jerry Falwell. Paul later portrayed Falwell in the 1990 television movie Fall From Grace about Jim and Tammy Faye Bakker, and then in the 1996 theatrical release The People vs. Larry Flynt.

Paul appeared in the film Eating Raoul (1982), written and directed by Paul Bartel. Also in 1982, he costarred on the short-lived sitcom Herbie, the Love Bug. He later appeared in Bartel's short film The Secret Cinema, which was part of the Amazing Stories series on television, and in Bartel’s Not for Publication.

== Personal life ==
Paul volunteered with Actors and Others for Animals and served on its board of directors. He also served on the mental-health advisory board for Los Angeles County and volunteered at childhood immunization clinics for the Los Angeles County Department of Health Services. He read books into tapes by special request at the Braille Institute in Los Angeles.

He married Patty Oestereich on September 7, 1968, in Pasadena, California, and they remained married until his death.

== Death ==
Paul died of cancer at age 58 on December 25, 1998, at his home in the Studio City area of Los Angeles.

== Filmography ==
=== Film ===
Year	Title	Role	Notes
1975	Coonskin	Sonny	Voice, Uncredited
1977	Exorcist II: The Heretic	Man on the Plane	
1982	Eating Raoul	Mr. Cray	
1983	The Man Who Wasn't There	Pudgy Aide	
1984	Not for Publication	Troppogrosso	
1986	Uphill All the Way	Thaddeus Dillman	
1987	The Princess Academy	Drago	
1987	Project X	Lead Ape	Uncredited
1988	Pass the Ammo	G.W. Wraith	
1992	Bloodfist III: Forced to Fight	Goddard	
1994	Beanstalk	Mayor Cecil Boggs	
1996	The Glass Cage	Mr. Silkerman	
1996	The People vs. Larry Flynt	Reverend Jerry Falwell	
1996	Mind Games	Dean Meyer	
2000	The Independent	Jeffries	(final film role)

=== Television ===
Year	Title	Role	Notes
1976	Maude	Mr. Bell	Episode: "Carol's Promotion" (S 4:Ep 23)
1976	Emergency!	Tom Ellis	Episode: "The Game" (S 6:Ep 1)
1976	Holmes and Yoyo	Claude	Episode: "Connection, Connection II" (S 1:Ep 11)
1977–78	Carter Country	Mayor Teddy Burnside	Main cast
1978	Space Force	D.O.R.C.	voice
1979	CHiPs	Himself (uncredited role)	Episode: "Roller Disco, part 2" (S 3:Ep 2)
1979	Fantasy Island	Colonel Hank Sutton	Episode: "The Handy Man / Tattoo's Romance" (S 3:EP 8)
1980	The Love Boat	Floyd Schofield	Episodes: "Kinfolk/Sis and the Slicker/Moonlight and Moonshine/Too Close for Comfort/The Affair, parts 1 and 2" (S 3:Eps. 18-19)
1980	Disneyland	Al Mathews	Episode: "The Sultan and the Rock Star" (S 26:Ep 14)
1980	Disneyland	Himself	Episode: "Disneyland's 25th Anniversary Show" (S 27:Ep1)
1980	One in a Million	Barton Stone	Main cast
1980	CHiPs	Himself (uncredited role)	Episode: "The Great 5K Star Race and Boulder Wrap Party, part 2" (S 4:Ep 6)
1980	Eight is Enough	Chuck	Episode: "Strike" (S 5:Ep 8)
1980	M*A*S*H	Captain Bainbridge	Episode: "Letters" (S 9:Ep 2)
1981	The Dukes of Hazzard	Clyde Amos	Episode: "By-Line, Daisy Duke" (S 3:Ep 18)
1981	WKRP in Cincinnati	Dr. Bob Halyers	Episode: "Clean Up Radio Everywhere" (S 3:Ep 22)
1982	Herbie, the Love Bug	Bo Phillips	Main cast
1982	Gimme a Break!	Stanley Nichols	Episode: "Nell Goes Door to Door" (S 2:Ep 10)
1982	Happy Days	Dick	Episode: "All I Want for Christmas" (S 10:Ep 10)
1983	Quincy, M.E.	Boxwell	Episode: "Quincy's Wedding, parts 1 and 2" (S 8:Ep 17-18)
1983	At Ease	Crenshaw	'Episode: "Valentine's Day" (S 1:Ep 12)
1985	Hail To the Chief	Rev. Billy Joe Bickerstaff	Main cast
1986–87	The New Gidget	Wilton Parmenter	4 episodes
1986	Amazing Stories	Mr. Krupp	Episode: "Secret Cinema" (S 1:Ep 20)
1987	Scarecrow and Mrs. King	Tagsworth	Episode: "Do You Take This Spy?" (S 4:Ep 16)
1987	227	Mr. Davis	Episode: "The Audit" (S 2:Ep16)
1987	Married... with Children	Sheriff	Episode: "Poppy's By the Tree, part 2" ( S2:Ep 2)
1987–91	Murder, She Wrote	Mayor Sam Booth	7 episodes
1988–95	Full House	Mr. Strowbridge	6 episodes
1990	Fall from Grace	Jerry Falwell	
1991	Beverly Hills 90210	Bob Barnett	'Episode: "B.Y.O.B." (S 1:Ep 11)
1991	Out of This World	Tex	Episode: "Would You Buy a Used Car From This Dude" (S 4:Ep 16)
1992	Who's the Boss?	Minister	Episode: "Better Off Wed, part 2" (S 8:Ep 18)
1992	Herman's Head	Mr. Fitzer	'Episode: "A Charlie Brown Fitzer" (S 2:Ep 13)
1994	RoboCop: The Series	Reverend Bob Taker	Episode: "Prime Suspect" (S 1:Ep3)
1996	The Drew Carey Show	Burt	Episode: "Something Wick This Way Comes" (S 2:Ep 2)
1997	Roseanne	Mayor	Episode: "Lanford's Elite, part 1" (S 9:Ep 16)
