= Passing Through (1977 film) =

1977 film by Larry Clark

- Directed by: Larry Clark
- Written by: Larry Clark; Ted Lange
- Starring: Nathaniel Taylor; Clarence Muse; Pamela B. Jones; Sherryl Thompson; Bob Ogburn
- Cinematography: George Geddis; Roderick Young
- Edited by: Larry Clark
- Music by: Horace Tapscott
- Release date: August 6, 1977
- Running time: 105 minutes
- Country: United States
- Language: English
- Budget: $13,000 (estimated)

Passing Through is a 1977 American film directed by Larry Clark and co-written by Clark and Ted Lange.

In 2023, the film was selected for preservation in the National Film Registry by the Library of Congress, being deemed "culturally, historically, or aesthetically significant".

== Plot ==
The film tells the story of ex-con musician Eddie Warmack, who is trying to re-establish himself as a musician, hoping that an elder in the craft, Poppa Harris, could help him while he evades a predatory music industry controlled by white society. Warmack had received his sentence because he killed a gang member who was white. The person killed by Warmack had blinded another musician named Skeeter. There is another character, Maya, who is the romantic partner of the main character.

Warmack attempts to lead a rebellion against the music establishment, but is unable to get allies. However, an assassin from said establishment slays Skeeter in response. Maya takes a photograph of the murder. The main character and his allies get revenge by attacking the boss of the musical industry and murdering him and those with him.

== Cast ==
- Nathaniel Taylor as Eddie Warmack
- Pamela B. Jones as Maya
- Sherryl Thompson as Trixie
- Bob Ogburn as Skeeter
- Clarence Muse as Poppa Harris
- Marla Gibbs as Secretary

== Creation ==
Clark was in the UCLA film program while he directed the film. Clark chose to stay in the program and continue making films with the UCLA facilities, which allowed him to do so more inexpensively. Therefore, he did not direct Passing Through as his capstone film.

During production, Charles Burnett worked as a cameraman while Julie Dash worked as a sound technician; both of them would also complete their studies at UCLA and direct landmark films of their own.

The film’s score, arranged by Horace Tapscott, features music by Eric Dolphy, Charlie Parker, John Coltrane and Sun Ra, as well as a live performance by the Pan African Peoples Arkestra.

== Release ==
Though it is now considered a landmark of American independent cinema, Passing Through cannot be seen outside of rare screenings by the director. Additionally, the film has not been released on home video.

When Clark made a personal appearance at a retrospective of his work at The Museum of Modern Art in 2022, he was asked why Passing Through could only be seen through theatrical exhibitions. Clark stated that he wanted to keep it that way so that the film would be seen in the right format and with a communal audience. He also expressed his disappointment at how films often look on home video formats, and he emphasized he did not want the film to be compromised in similar fashion. Clark added he was under no commercial pressure to make more money through home distribution as the film had been self-financed.

That same year, Peter Lucas, who established the Houston Museum of Fine Arts program Jazz on Film, reiterated Clark's statements, adding that Passing Through was not likely to get a physical release nor a release on a streaming network.

Screenings for Passing Through typically come from a 16mm print or from a DCP made from a digital preservation courtesy of the UCLA Film & Television Archive.

== Reception ==
According to Jan-Christopher Horak, the reactions were "mixed" in the "mainstream press". Since then, the film's reputation has grown in stature, with Richard Brody of The New Yorker calling it "one of the greatest movies about jazz."

Brody also praised the opening sequence as "a montage of musical creation, featuring multiple exposures of a vigorously modern group seen in mood-rich tones of blue and red; the rapid fingering of a saxophone and the angular athleticism of drumming are superimposed to give visual identity to the music’s rhythms. The sequence fuses documentary and impressionism, recording and transformation, while also crowning its painterly energy with yet another rhythmic red light that’s a part of the jazz life: a rotating one atop a police car."

Jonathan Rosenbaum of The Chicago Reader hailed the film as "original and thoughtful...a very special first feature, with a feeling for the music that’s boldly translated into film style."

Jazz critic Gary Giddins championed the film as "a genuinely innovative drama of Los Angeles musicians, in which Horace Tapscott’s score and recorded excerpts by Charlie Parker, Eric Dolphy and others telegraph the emotions of the characters with a specificity rare in any film...it’s like nothing else you’ve seen." With regards to the music, Giddins wrote that "Clark understands the distinctions between bebop and hard bop, borderline avant-garde and full-body avant-garde jazz. He uses those distinctions to telegraph the mood of the characters and story, combining original music with excerpts from classic jazz recordings."
