= Fred Berry =

American actor and dancer (1951–2003)

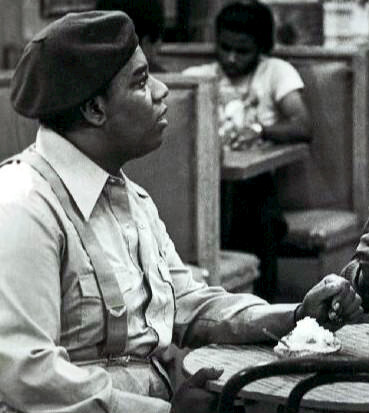
- Berry in 1977
- Born: Fred Allen Berry; March 19, 1951; St. Louis, Missouri, U.S.
- Died: October 21, 2003 (aged 52); Los Angeles, California, U.S.
- Resting place: Forest Lawn Memorial Park, Hollywood Hills, California, U.S.
- Occupations: Actor, street dancer
- Years active: 1972–2003
- Spouse(s): Franchesska Berry (1976) (1978–1980); Carol Ann Ross (1984–1991); Darlene Bitten (1994–1999); Essie Berry (1999–2003)
- Children: 3

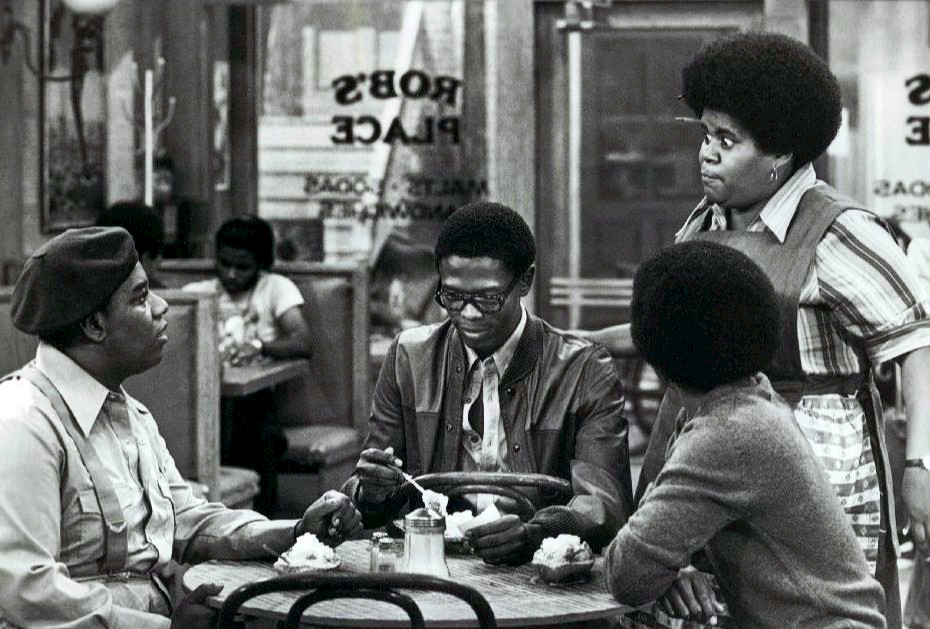
From TV's What's Happening!! (1977). Seated, L-R: Fred Berry, Ernest Lee Thomas, and Haywood Nelson (back to camera). Standing: Shirley Hemphill.

Fred Rerun Berry (born Fred Allen Berry; March 19, 1951 – October 21, 2003) was an American actor and street dancer. He was best known for his role as Freddie "Rerun" Stubbs on the 1970s television show What's Happening!! and its sequel series What's Happening Now!!

== Career ==
Berry was born on March 19, 1951, in St. Louis, Missouri, and grew up in the inner-city projects. He had aspirations of becoming a successful dancer and actor as a child. Early in his career, Berry was a member of the Los Angeles–based dance troupe The Lockers, with whom he appeared on the third episode of Saturday Night Live in 1975. He additionally appeared on the dance music show Soul Train, and was featured in the program's signature line dance segment doing the memorable early 1970s dance step "the slo-mo".

Berry achieved more widespread fame playing the character Freddie "Rerun" Stubbs on the ABC sitcom What's Happening!!, which aired from 1976 to 1979 as he was in his mid 20s. The role was originally set for a skinny and white actor. The character was called Rerun as a sobriquet because he continuously repeated all of his classes during summer school. Rerun became one of the show's top characters, wearing a trademark red beret and suspenders while sporting the dance moves that Berry previously used during his time with The Lockers. In 1985, Berry returned to reprise his role in the series What's Happening Now!!. He was fired before the first season ended due to a salary dispute, in which Berry requested more money than the rest of the cast.

Berry struggled with drug and alcohol issues throughout his life. In 1996, he told People magazine, “I was a millionaire by the time I was 29, but then the stress of success got to me. The fat jokes got to me. And I got heavily into drugs and alcohol.” In a 1996 interview, he said that he had been experimenting with drugs and alcohol since he was a teenager, and becoming more successful meant he could afford more drugs. Berry attempted suicide three times, but later recovered and spent his time visiting many churches.

During the 1990s, Berry became a motivational speaker and Baptist minister, and lost 100 lbs after being diagnosed with type 2 diabetes.

In 2001, he appeared as himself on the second Classic TV Stars edition of The Weakest Link where he was the first contestant voted off.

== Personal life and death ==
Berry was married six times to four different women, the first two of whom he married twice each. He had three children: DeShannon, Portia, and Freddy (who works as Fred Berry Jr.).

Berry was born with the name Allen as his middle name, later legally changing his middle name to Rerun due to the widespread public association with his role as the character on What’s Happening!!

On October 21, 2003, Berry was found dead at his Los Angeles home, where he was recovering from a stroke. The cause of death was listed as natural causes. He is interred at Forest Lawn Memorial Park in the Hollywood Hills of Los Angeles.

== Filmography ==
- Hammer (1972) – Dancer (uncredited)
- What's Happening!! (1976–1979) – Freddie "Rerun" Stubbs
- The Brady Bunch Hour (1977) – Rerun (one episode)
- Vice Squad (1982) – Sugar Pimp Dorsey
- A Stroke of Genius (1984)
- Alice (1984) – Bobo (one episode)
- What's Happening Now!! (1985–1986) – Freddie "Rerun" Stubbs
- Martin (1993) – Himself (one episode)
- In the Hood (1998) – Uncle Paul
- Big Money Hustlas (2000) – Bootleg Greg
- Bum Runner (2002) – Can Man (short film)
- Scrubs (2003) – Himself (one episode)
- Dickie Roberts: Former Child Star (2003) – Himself
- In the Land of Merry Misfits (2007) – Himself (posthumous release)

=== Other selected appearances ===
- Battle of the Network Stars III (1977) – Himself
- "I Wonder Who She's Seeing Now" by The Temptations (1988) – Club Patron (music video)
- The Howard Stern Show (1992) – Himself (one episode)
- Phil Donahue Show (1992) – Himself | Episode: "Famous Past Celebrities"
- In Living Color (1993) – Himself (one episode)
- Murder Was the Case: The Movie (1995) – Rerun (music video short)
- The Freshest Kids: A History of the B-Boy (2001) – Himself
- The Weakest Link (2001) – Himself (Classic TV Stars Special Edition #2)
- I Love the '70s (2003) – Himself (one episode)
