= One in a Million (American TV series) =

- Genre: Sitcom
- Starring: Shirley Hemphill; Keene Curtis; Carl Ballantine; Mel Stewart; Ann Weldon; Richard Paul; Dorothy Fielding; Ralph Wilcox
- Country of origin: United States
- Original language: English
- No. of seasons: 1
- No. of episodes: 13

Production
- Executive producers: Saul Turteltaub; Bernie Orenstein; Sid Dorfman; Arnold Kane
- Running time: 30 Minutes
- Production companies: TOY Productions; Columbia Pictures Television

Original release
- Network: ABC
- Release: January 8 – June 23, 1980

One in a Million is an American television sitcom that aired on ABC for one season in 1980. The show was developed as a starring vehicle for comic actress Shirley Hemphill after the success of What's Happening!! (1976–1979), in which she played a supporting role. The show was not a success and was canceled after 13 episodes. The series was broadcast on Saturdays at 8 p.m Eastern time.

== Plot ==
Shirley Simmons is a sharp-tongued Los Angeles taxicab driver who frequents a local diner owned by Max Kellerman and lives with her parents. She inherits controlling interest in the conglomerate Grayson Enterprises at the death of its founder Jonathan Grayson, one of her regular fares. Shirley is offered a $200 million buyout but declines the money in order to remain as chairman of the board. She clashes with conservative company vice president Roland Cushing but finds allies in secretary Nancy Boyer and attorney Barton Stone.

== Cast ==
- Shirley Hemphill as Shirley Simmons
- Richard Paul as Barton Stone
- Billy Wallace as Dennis
- Carl Ballantine as Max Kellerman
- Ralph Wilcox as Duke
- Mel Stewart as Raymond Simmons
- Keene Curtis as Mr. Cushing
- Ann Weldon as Edna Simmons
- Dorothy Fielding as Nancy Boyer

== Episodes ==
No.	Title	Original release date
1	"Chairman of the Board"	January 8, 1980
2	"Executive Dad"	January 15, 1980
3	"Shirley's Prince of a Guy"	January 26, 1980
4	"On the Cuff"	February 2, 1980
Guest star: Ellen Bry (Joanie)
5	"Lost Weekend"	February 9, 1980
6	"Stone vs. Simmons"	February 16, 1980
7	"The Chairman Babysits"	February 23, 1980
8	"Suddenly Single"	March 1, 1980
9	"Cushing Quits"	March 8, 1980
10	"Max Falls in Love"	March 15, 1980
11	"Over the Hill"	March 22, 1980
12	"The Committee"	March 29, 1980
13	"The Italian Connection"	April 5, 1980
