= The Redd Foxx Show =

American TV sitcom (1986)

- Pamela Segall, Redd Foxx and Rosanna DeSoto
- Genre: Sitcom
- Created by: Bob Comfort; Rick Kellard; Stuart Sheslow
- Directed by: Neema Barnette; Stan Lathan; Dick Martin; Tony Singletary
- Starring: Redd Foxx; Rosanna DeSoto; Nathaniel Taylor; Pamela Segall; Theodore Wilson; Sinbad
- Opening theme: "Heart of the City" performed by Kool & the Gang
- Composer: Sonny Burke
- Country of origin: United States
- Original language: English
- No. of seasons: 1
- No. of episodes: 13

Production
- Executive producers: Rick Kellard; Stuart Sheslow
- Producers: Tom Biener; Ron Landry; Eric Cohen; Jack Seifert; George Sunga
- Running time: 30 minutes
- Production companies: Thunder Road Productions; Lorimar Productions

Original release
- Network: ABC
- Release: January 18 – April 19, 1986

The Redd Foxx Show is an American television sitcom that premiered January 18, 1986, on ABC. The show was cancelled after 3 months, partly due to low ratings in its Saturday-night timeslot (the eighth episode aired in a Friday-night slot). Although the first two episodes brought in decent ratings, the show usually finished in the bottom ten for the week. A total of 13 episodes were made.

== Overview ==
Al Hughes, a New York City diner/newsstand owner, adopts a streetwise teenager named Toni. Diana worked with Al in the newsstand, and Jim-Jam owned a Chinese restaurant nearby. During the brief 13-episode run, the actor playing the character of Jim-Jam was replaced, the character Toni "disappeared", and in came Al's ex-wife Felicia and his foster son, Byron.

== Cast ==
- Redd Foxx – Al Hughes
- Barry Van Dyke – Sgt. Dwight Stryker
- Pamela Adlon – Toni Rutledge (then still known as Pamela Segall)
- Rosanna DeSoto – Diana Olmos
- Nathaniel Taylor – Jim-Jam (No. 1)
- Theodore Wilson – Jim-Jam (No. 2)
- Beverly Todd – Felicia
- Sinbad – Byron Lightfoot
- Ursaline Bryant – Darice Dix
- Charlie Adler – Ralph/Rita

== Episodes ==
No.	Title	Directed by	Written by	Original release date
1	"Pilot"	Dave Powers	Story by : Bob Comfort, Rick Kellard & Stuart Sheslow; Teleplay by : Bob Comfort & Rick Kellard	January 18, 1986
2	"High School Blues"	Howard Storm	Rick Kellard	January 25, 1986
3	"High Blood Pressure"	Howard Storm	Rick Kellard	February 1, 1986
4	"My Funny Valentine"	Howard Storm	Eric Cohen	February 8, 1986
5	"The Good Samaritan"	Tony Singletary	Eric Cohen	February 15, 1986
6	"Al's First Date"	Dick Martin	Rex Beaumont & Danny Strong	February 22, 1986
7	"Old Buddies"	Carroll O'Connor & Lee Bernhardi	Carroll O'Connor	March 1, 1986
8	"The Prodigal Son"	Tony Singletary	Story by : Stuart Sheslow & Rick Kellard; Teleplay by : Rick Kellard	March 14, 1986
9	"Lotto Fever"	Stan Lathan	Rick Kellard	March 15, 1986
10	"Mr. Right and Wrong"	Lee Bernhardi	Phil Kellard & Tom Moore	March 22, 1986
11	"A Night to Forget"	Bill Foster	John Donley & Clay Graham	March 29, 1986
12	"The Old & the Restless"	Stan Lathan	Story by : Rick Kellard & Stuart Sheslow; Teleplay by : Phil Kellard & Tom Moore	April 12, 1986
13	"High Noon"	Dick Martin	Story by : Redd Foxx; Teleplay by : Phil Kellard, Tom Moore & Maiya Williams	April 19, 1986

== Ratings ==
- Episode 1: 14.2/24 (46th out of 71)
- Episode 2: 14.9/24 (45th out of 67)
- Episode 3: 9.0/16 (63rd out of 68)
- Episode 4: 10.5/18 (55th out of 60)
- Episode 5: 10.6/17 (61st out of 66)
- Episode 6: 9.0/16 (65th out of 68)
- Episode 7: 10.2/18 (55th out of 63)
- Episode 8: 12.2/19 (53rd out of 69)
- Episode 9: 9.9/17 (61st out of 69)
- Episode 10: 10.3/19 (59th out of 65)
- Episode 11: 8.6/16 (62nd out of 65)
- Episode 12: 8.1/15 (67th out of 71)
- Episode 13: 6.8/12 (62nd out of 64)
