= Trouble Man (1972 film) =

1972 film by Ivan Dixon

- Theatrical film poster
- Directed by: Ivan Dixon
- Written by: John D. F. Black
- Produced by: Joel Freeman; John D. F. Black (executive producer)
- Starring: Robert Hooks; Paul Winfield; Paula Kelly
- Cinematography: Michel Hugo
- Edited by: Michael Kahn
- Music by: Marvin Gaye
- Distributed by: 20th Century-Fox
- Release date: November 1, 1972
- Running time: 99 minutes
- Country: United States
- Language: English

Trouble Man is a 1972 American blaxploitation crime thriller film directed by Ivan Dixon and produced and released by 20th Century-Fox. The film stars Robert Hooks as "Mr. T.", a hard-edged private detective who tends to take justice into his own hands. Its popular soundtrack is written, produced and performed by Marvin Gaye.

== Plot summary ==
An inner-city point man is on the run from both the cops and the crooks in this streetwise drama. T (Robert Hooks) is a combination pool shark, private detective, and all-purpose ghetto fixer who operates out of a billiards parlor in South Central Los Angeles. T has done well for himself—he buys a fancy new car every year, wears expensive suits, and lives in an upscale apartment. However, he also looks out for folks in South Central, has indifferent connections with both the police and gangsters, and generally knows how to tell the good guys from the bad guys on either side of the law. T is approached by Chalky (Paul Winfield) and his partner, Pete (Ralph Waite), who run floating dice games in the neighborhood. Chalky tells T they have been ripped off several times by a group of four robbers, and they want to hire him to find out who the masked men are.

T takes it as a routine assignment and is willing to do the job for the right price. What he does not know is that Chalky and Pete are trying to take down rival crime kingpin Big (Julius Harris). They frame T for the killing of one of Big's underlings, who is shot by Chalky moments after a dice game is robbed by four men (T was present at the hold-up). An anonymous informant blames T for the killing and makes him the target for Big and for LAPD captain Joe Marx (William Smithers), who dislikes T on principle. That sets off a series of cunning twists and confrontations that T is determined to survive, which became complicated when Big is shot and killed in front of T.

== Cast ==
- Robert Hooks as "Mr. T"
- Paul Winfield as "Chalky" Price
- Ralph Waite as Pete Cockrell
- William Smithers as Captain Joe Marx
- Paula Kelly as Cleo
- Julius Harris as "Big"
- Bill Henderson as Jimmy
- Wayne Storm as Frank
- Akili Jones as Billy Chi
- Vince Howard as Preston
- Stack Pierce as Collie
- Nathaniel Taylor as Leroy
- Lawrence Cook as Buddy
- Virginia Capers as Macy
- Rick Ferrell as Pindar
- James "Texas Blood" Brown as Wesley
- Gordon Jump as Salter
- Jean Bell as Leona

== Production ==
The film was written and executive produced by John D. F. Black, who had co-written Shaft (1971). Black, who had written for various television shows such as Johnny Staccato, hoped to find success on the trend set by that film. This was the directorial debut of Ivan Dixon, who had become a director in 1970 after trying to hone his craft by asking questions when acting on Hogan's Heroes.

Black and his wife were interviewed about the making of the film in 2019 for the podcast The Projection Booth.

== Critical reception ==
The film was featured in the 1978 Harry Medved book, The Fifty Worst Films of All Time. In contrast, Complex included Trouble Man on its 2009 list of "The 50 Best Blaxploitation Movies of All Time".

New York Times reviewer Vincent Canby described it as "a horrible movie, but worth thinking about."

Jimi Izrael of NPR called Trouble Man "a strong film", but one that "never had an entry point for mainstream audiences to grasp."

== In other media ==
The soundtrack is referred to in the film Captain America: The Winter Soldier and the associated TV series The Falcon and the Winter Soldier as being essential listening for Steve Rogers in understanding the modern world as it is described as "a masterpiece" that "captures the African-American experience".

== See also ==
- List of American films of 1972
- List of blaxploitation films
