= Mark Warren (TV director) =

- Born: Mark Edward Warren III; September 24, 1938; Harrodsburg, Kentucky U.S.
- Died: January 11, 1999 (aged 60); Los Angeles, California, U.S.
- Occupation: Television director
- Years active: 1962–1999
- Spouse: Beryl Toomes (? –1999) (his death)
- Website: markedwardwarrenofficialwebsite.com

Mark Warren (September 24, 1938 –January 11, 1999) was an American television and film director. In 1971, became the first African American to win an Emmy Award for directing. He won for directing an episode of Rowan and Martin's Laugh-In featuring Orson Welles.

== Career ==
Warren's career began in the early 1960s at the Canadian Broadcasting Company, where he became a producer and director in charge of variety programming. By the late 1960s, he was working in American television. Besides Rowan and Martin's Laugh-In he directed episodes of several popular television series of 1970s and 1980s including: Sanford and Son, What's Happening!!, Barney Miller, and The Dukes of Hazzard. He also directed the 1972 feature film, Come Back, Charleston Blue.

== Death ==
He died of cancer on January 11, 1999, at Cedars-Sinai Medical Center in Los Angeles.
