= Mixed Company =

1974 film by Melville Shavelson

- Film poster by Frank Frazetta
- Directed by: Melville Shavelson
- Written by: Melville Shavelson; Mort Lachman
- Produced by: Melville Shavelson
- Starring: Barbara Harris; Joseph Bologna; Tom Bosley; Lisa Gerritsen; Dorothy Shay; Ruth McDevitt; Arianne Heller; Haywood Nelson; Eric Olson; Jina Tan
- Cinematography: Stan Lazan
- Edited by: Walter Thompson; Ralph James Hall
- Music by: Fred Karlin
- Production company: Llenroc Productions
- Distributed by: United Artists
- Release date: October 18, 1974 (U.S.)
- Running time: 109 minutes
- Country: United States
- Language: English

Mixed Company is a 1974 American comedy-drama film directed by Melville Shavelson and written by Shavelson and Mort Lachman. It stars Barbara Harris, Joseph Bologna, Tom Bosley, Lisa Gerritsen, Dorothy Shay, Ruth McDevitt and Haywood Nelson.

== Plot summary ==
Kathy Morrison (Harris), mother of three, who helps run a "color-blind" adoption program, wants to have another biological child. Her husband, Pete (Bologna), the head coach of the Phoenix Suns, finds out he can't produce another child. Kathy thinks about adopting a boy, Frederic "Freddie" Wilcox, and Pete does not want to adopt a boy who happens to be black. When he relents, Freddie's arrival causes an upheaval in the Morrison's neighborhood, their school, and their family. Kathy's answer is to adopt another child, in this case two, a war-traumatized half-Vietnamese girl, Quan Tran, and a Hopi boy, Joe Rogers. The new extended family must now learn to live together.

== Cast ==
- Barbara Harris as Kathy Morrison, Pete's wife
- Joseph Bologna as Pete Morrison, Kathy's husband
- Tom Bosley as Al
- Lisa Gerritsen as Liz Morrison, Pete & Kathy's older daughter
- Dorothy Shay as Marge Reese
- Ruth McDevitt as Miss Bergquist
- Arianne Heller as Mary Morrison, Pete & Kathy's younger daughter
- Stephen Honanie as Joe Rogers, Pete & Kathy's adoptive son from Hopi
- Haywood Nelson as Freddie Wilcox, Pete & Kathy's adoptive son from Africa
- Eric Olson as Rob Morrison, Pete & Kathy's son
- Jina Tan as Quan Tran, Pete & Kathy's adoptive daughter from Vietnamese
- Bob G. Anthony as Krause
- Roger Price as The Doctor
- Keith Hamilton as Milton
- Jason Clark as Police Sergeant
- Charles J. Samsill as Police Officer
- Jophery Brown as Basketball Player (credited as Jophery Clifford Brown)
- Rodney Hundley as Announcer
- Darell T. Garretson as Referee
- Calvin Brown as Santa Claus
- Al McCoy as Voice of the Phoenix Suns
- Ron McIlwan as Walt Johnson

== See also ==
- List of American films of 1974
- List of basketball films
