= Shirley Hemphill =

American actress and comedian (1947–1999)

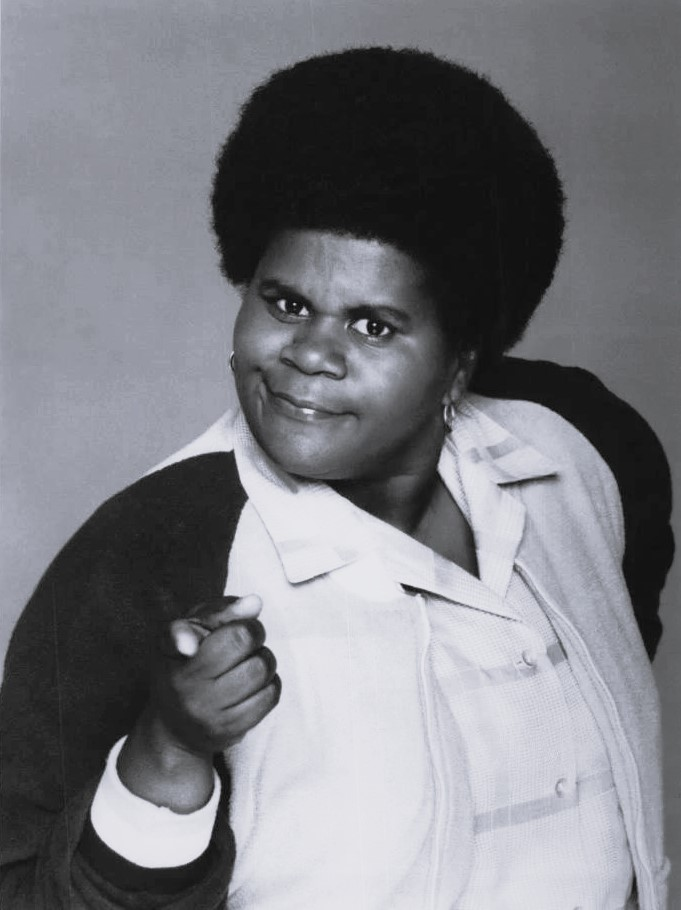
- Hemphill in 1980
- Born: Shirley Ann Hemphill; July 1, 1947; Asheville, North Carolina, U.S.
- Died: December 10, 1999 (aged 52); West Covina, California, U.S.
- Education: Morristown College
- Occupations: Comedian, actress
- Years active: 1976–1999

Shirley Ann Hemphill (July 1, 1947 – December 10, 1999) was an American stand-up comedian and actress.

A native of Asheville, North Carolina, Hemphill moved to Los Angeles in the 1970s to pursue a career as a stand-up comedian. After working the Los Angeles comedy club circuit, her routine eventually attracted attention leading to her being cast in guest starring roles on television. In 1976, she landed the role of brassy waitress Shirley Wilson on the sitcom What's Happening!!.

The series was a modest hit for ABC, but production and cast problems caused ABC to cancel the series in 1979. The following year, Hemphill was cast in her own sitcom, One in a Million. The series failed to attract an audience and was canceled in June 1980.

In 1985, Hemphill reprised her role as Shirley Wilson in the syndicated revival of What's Happening!! titled What's Happening Now!!; in the latter her character is co-owner of the restaurant where she works. Like its predecessor, What's Happening Now!! aired for three seasons. After the show's cancellation, Hemphill returned to stand-up comedy and also made occasional appearances in films and television until her death in December 1999.

== Early life and career ==
Hemphill was born in Asheville, North Carolina, to Richard and Mozella Hemphill. She had a brother, William. Hemphill attended Hill Street School and Stephens-Lee High School, and later won an athletics scholarship to Morristown College where she majored in physical education. Hemphill returned to Asheville two years later and got a job in a factory manufacturing nylons.

An aspiring stand-up comedian, Hemphill sent a cassette tape of one of her comedy routines to Flip Wilson. Wilson was impressed by her routine and in turn, sent her a cassette recorder and a dozen roses. Wilson also invited Hemphill to visit the set of The Flip Wilson Show. After the visit, Hemphill returned to her job in Asheville but decided to pursue a career in comedy instead. She quit her job and traveled to Los Angeles by bus. Hemphill got a job waitressing during the day and performed at The Comedy Store at night.

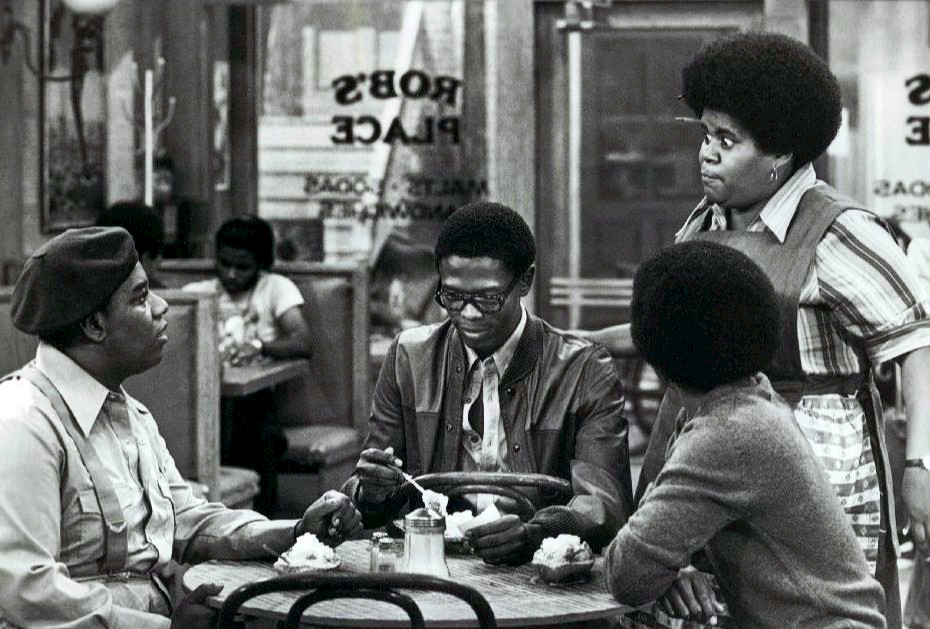
From TV's What's Happening!! (1977). Seated, L-R: Fred Berry, Ernest Lee Thomas, and Haywood Nelson (back to camera). Standing: Shirley Hemphill.

By 1976, Hemphill's stand-up routine started to get noticed and caught the attention of casting agent Jane Murray. Murray cast Hemphill in a guest role on Good Times which led to another guest starring role on All's Fair. After seeing her performance on Good Times, Norman Lear offered Hemphill her own spin-off series but she turned it down. Instead she auditioned and won the role of waitress Shirley Wilson on the ABC sitcom What's Happening!!.

Loosely based on Eric Monte's 1975 film Cooley High, the series follows the adventures of three teenaged boys: Raj (Ernest Thomas), Rerun (Fred Berry), and Dwayne (Haywood Nelson). Hemphill's character worked at Rob's Place, the restaurant the boys frequented. The series was a modest hit for ABC but was beset with behind the scene problems.

In the series' second season, Fred Berry and Ernest Thomas staged a walkout over conditions in their dressing rooms which they said were unsuitable. During the series' third season, Fred Berry demanded more money and reportedly convinced Ernest Thomas and Haywood Nelson to join him in a strike. Producers opted to cancel the series instead of increasing the actors' salaries.

Following the cancellation of What's Happening, Hemphill auditioned for the role of the cook on Archie Bunker's Place, but the role went to Anne Meara. The day after losing the role, Hemphill was offered the starring role in her own sitcom One in a Million. On the series, she portrayed Shirley Simmons, a taxi driver who inherited a huge corporation and fortune from one of her customers. The series debuted on ABC on January 8, 1980, but failed to attract a sufficient audience. ABC canceled the series in June 1980.

Afterward Hemphill spent most of the early 1980s working in nightclubs around the U.S. and making occasional guest appearances on TV shows, including The Love Boat and Trapper John, M.D.. In 1985, she was invited to co-star on the revival of What's Happening!! entitled What's Happening Now!!, which aired in syndication from 1985 to 1988. After What's Happening Now!! ended its three-year run, she again worked the nightclub scene and doing the occasional acting gig on a number of '90s comedy sitcoms, including Martin and The Wayans Bros.. In 1993, she appeared in her first movie, CB4 which starred Chris Rock. Two years later she co-starred in her second movie, Shoot the Moon, starring Whitney Anderson.

Throughout her career, Hemphill performed her stand-up routine on a number of popular TV shows including The Tonight Show Starring Johnny Carson, A&E's An Evening at the Improv, BET's Black Comedy Showcase and Black Comedy Tonight. She was also a regular at The Laugh Factory comedy club in Los Angeles. A year before her death, Hemphill appeared in an episode of The Jenny Jones Show in a What's Happening!! reunion show; actors Ernest Thomas and Haywood Nelson also appeared.

== Death ==
On December 10, 1999, Hemphill was found dead at her home in West Covina, California, aged 52. Her body was discovered by a gardener who looked through a window and saw her lying on her bedroom floor. An autopsy determined that Hemphill died of kidney failure.

== Filmography ==
Year	Title	Role	Notes
1976	All's Fair	Big O	Episode: "The Gang Leader"
1976	Good Times	Rozzie	Episode: "Rich Is Better Than Poor... Maybe"
1977	The Richard Pryor Special?	Pushy Fan from Tour Group	Television special
1976–1979	What's Happening!!	Shirley Wilson	60 episodes
1980	One in a Million	Shirley Simmons	13 episodes
1982	The Love Boat	Charlene Grover	Episode: "Isaac Gets Physical/She Brought Her Mother Along/Cold Feet"
1983	Trapper John, M.D.	Lacy	Episode: "Fat Chance"
1984	Pryor's Place		Episode: "Sax Education"
1985–1988	What's Happening Now!!	Shirley Wilson	66 episodes
1993	CB4	976-Sexy	
1993	The Sinbad Show	Mamie	Episode: "I Coulda' Been the Man"
1994	Martin	Sister Claus	Episode: "Go Tell It on the Martin"
1996	Shoot the Moon	Lula Jones, PhD	
1996	The Wayans Bros.	Coco	Episode: "Hearts and Flowers
1999	Linc's		Episode: "Speaking in Tongues"
