= Parents Anonymous =

Self-help group

Parents Anonymous (PA) is a self-help group for parents with the goal of preventing child abuse and providing support for parents. PA, first called Mother's Anonymous, was founded in 1967 by a 29-year-old mother, Jolly K., and a psychiatric social worker, Leonard L. Lieber. Jolly K. was under Lieber's care at the time, and he suggested she meet with another parent from his caseload who had similar issues. The organization grew slowly until it received a grant from the Office of Child Development and Health Education and Welfare in 1974. Unlike traditional twelve-step programs, PA mandates professional involvement, accepts funding from outside sources, but does emphasize the importance of protecting members' anonymity and never charges parents a fee, dues or charge for attending. The PA Chapter Development Manual requires each chapter have professional facilitator who "should be a professional person from a 'helping' field with a profound respect for the self-help concept." Parents Anonymous publishes a periodical, Frontiers, and several manuals in addition to the Chapter Development Manual.
