= Ted Lange =

American actor, director and screenwriter (born 1948)

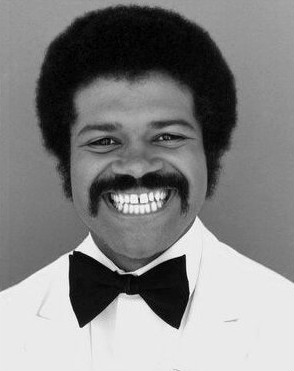
- Lange as Isaac Washington, 1977
- Born: Theodore William Lange III; January 5, 1948 (age 78); Oakland, California, U.S.
- Education: City College of San Francisco; Merritt College (AA); Royal Academy of Dramatic Art
- Occupations: Actor; director; screenwriter
- Years active: 1972–present
- Known for: Isaac Washington – The Love Boat
- Spouses: Sheryl Thompson (m. 1978; div. 1989) Mary Ley (m. 2001)
- Children: 2

Theodore William Lange III (/lændʒ/; born January 5, 1948) is an American actor, director and screenwriter best known for his roles as bartender Isaac Washington in the TV series The Love Boat (1977–1986) and Junior in That's My Mama (1974–75).

== Early life, family and education ==
Lange was born in Oakland, California, in 1948, the son of Geraldine and Theodore William Jr., both working in theatre and television. Lange graduated from Oakland Technical High School where he was class and student body president. He completed an associate of arts degree at Merritt Junior College in Oakland before majoring in Drama at San Francisco City College. At City College, Lange was particularly active on the theatre scene and named Best Actor by the Black Students Association. He also won a scholarship to the University of Colorado Shakespearean Festival in the summer of 1968. Lange is a directing alumnus of The American Film Institute.

== Career ==
=== Career beginnings ===
After college, Lange started in theatre appearing in local Oakland productions and as guest artist in residence at the University of Santa Clara. Later, he joined the New Shakespearan Company, acting in plays at the University of California, Berkeley.

Lange made his Broadway debut in the musical Hair and was featured in the first national touring of the show. He also performed in a one-man show, Behind the Mask: An Evening with Paul Laurence Dunbar.

Lange's first screen appearance was in the documentary film Wattstax in 1973. After appearing in the film Black Belt Jones in 1974, he portrayed Junior on the series That's My Mama before landing the role of the ship's bartender, Isaac, on The Love Boat in 1977, opposite Gavin MacLeod. After he left the show in 1987, Lange appeared in various films and in guest roles on 227, In the Heat of the Night, Evening Shade, Boy Meets World, The King of Queens, Scrubs, Drake & Josh, Psych, The Cleveland Show, and Are We There Yet?

In the early 1980s, following a letter of recommendation from Lynn Redgrave (whom he met on an episode of The Love Boat), Lange attended a summer school at the Royal Academy of Dramatic Art to perfect his Shakespeare acting skills.

=== Directing and writing ===
In 1977, he co-wrote the screenplay for the drama Passing Through, starring Nathaniel Taylor. During the run of The Love Boat, Lange also served as director and screenwriter of several episodes of the series. In 1999, Lange directed two episodes of Love Boat: The Next Wave, the UPN series based on The Love Boat. He also directed episodes of Moesha, Dharma & Greg, and Eve. In 2008, he directed the drama For Love of Amy.

Lange has also done extensive theater work as playwright and stage director. He has penned 17 plays, including George Washington's Boy, a historical drama about the relationship between the first president and his favorite slave, along with the comedy Lemon Meringue Facade.

Lange remained close to Gavin MacLeod, his acting mentor, who was a Palm Springs resident and saw his plays. In a 2014 interview with CBS New York, he said of his long-running friendship with him "Gavin lives in Palm Springs, I'm in LA. So, when I do my plays, he comes down and sees my plays or I'll go see what he's doing!" Lange also said in a 2017 interview with The Wiseguyz Show: "Oh yeah, sure, Gavin was wonderful. Gavin lives down here in Palm Springs and we're still tight, all of us, Gavin and Bernie and Jill; we still see each other. Fred lives in a different state, we're still close, we're still good friends."

=== "Ask Isaac" ===
Before the American edition of FHM folded in 2006, Lange wrote a sex and advice column, titled "Ask Isaac", with adult film actress Jenna Jameson.

=== Celebrity Fit Club ===
In 2006, Lange appeared in the fourth season of the VH1 reality show Celebrity Fit Club. He lost 28 pounds during the show's run.

== Personal life ==
Lange married Sheryl Thompson in 1978, and they divorced in 1989. The couple has two children, Theodore William IV and Turner Wallace Lange. Lange married Mary Ley in 2001. His mother, Geraldine Lange, was a personal secretary to a San Francisco mayor and was public affairs director of KBHK-TV in San Francisco in the early 1970s. She also hosted programs on KBHK-TV. She died from COVID-19 on April 10, 2021, at the age of 96.

== Awards ==
For his work theater directing, Lange received the NAACP's Renaissance Man Theatre Award, the Heroes and Legends HAL Lifetime Achievement Award, and the Dramalogue Award. Lange has also been the recipient of the James Cagney Directing Fellow Scholarship Award from the American Film Institute along with the Paul Robeson Award from Oakland's Ensemble Theatre.

== Filmography ==
Film
Year	Film	Role	Other notes
1973	Wattstax	Himself	Documentary film
1973	Trick Baby	Melvin the Pimp	Alternative title: The Double Con
1973	Blade	Henry Watson	
1974	Black Belt Jones	Militant	Uncredited
1975	Friday Foster	Fancy Dexter	
1977	Passing Through	-	Co-writer
1978	Record City	The Wiz	
1987	Terminal Exposure	Fantastic	Alternative title: Double Exposure
1988	Glitch!	DuBois	
1989	Othello	Othello	Also director
1990	Penny Ante: The Motion Picture	The Deacon	
1991	Perfume	George	
1992	The Naked Truth	The Flower Peddler	
1998	Sandman	Gnome	
2000	The Redemption	Reverend	
2002	Is This Your Mother?		
2003	Banana Moon	Prof. Williams	Also co-producer
2003	Gang of Roses	Bartender #2	
2006	Uncle Tom's Apartment	Pops	
2006	National Lampoon's Dorm Daze 2	Celebrity Judge #2	
2007	Last of the Romantics	Cole Henderson	
2007	Carts	Sam	
2008	Senior Skip Day	Reverend	Alternative title: High School's Day Off
2009	Who Shot Mamba?	Dr. Crazy	
2009	The Adventures of Umbweki	Airline Captain Boka	
2009	For Love of Amy	-	Director
2010	Bed & Breakfast	Judge / Mediator	
2011	Phil Cobb's Dinner for Four	Old Friend	
Television
Year	Title	Role	Notes
1974–1975	That's My Mama	Junior	39 episodes
1976	Mr. T and Tina	Harvard	5 episodes
1977–1987	The Love Boat	Bartender Isaac Washington	246 episodes, also director and writer
1977	The Love Boat II	Bartender Isaac Washington	Television movie
1977	The New Love Boat	Bartender Isaac Washington	Television movie
1979	Fantasy Island	The Great Scott	1 episode
1979	Charlie's Angels	Bartender Isaac Washington	1 episode
1983	The Fall Guy	Bartender	3 episodes, director
1983	Fantasy Island	-	1 episode, director
1984	Mickey Spillane's Mike Hammer	-	2 episodes, director
1986	That's My Mama Now!	Junior	Television movie
1986	John Grin's Christmas	Ghost of Christmas Present	Television movie
1987	Starman	-	1 episode, director
1988	Christmas	Ghost of Christmas Present	Television movie
1988	227	Lou Wilson	1 episode
1988	In the Heat of the Night	James Jeffson	1 episode
1989	It Nearly Wasn't Christmas	Napoleon	Television movie
1990	The Love Boat: A Valentine Voyage	Bartender Isaac Washington	Television movie
1993	Evening Shade	Mr. Taxerman	1 episode
1995	Platypus Man	Mr. Angel	1 episode
1996	Weird Science	Isaac	1 episode
1996–2000	Moesha	-	Director, 5 episodes
1997	Martin	Bartender Isaac Washington	2 episodes
1997	Family Matters	Frank Winslow	1 episode
1997	Boy Meets World	Himself	1 episode
1998	Love Boat: The Next Wave	Bartender Isaac Washington	1 episode
1998	The Wayans Bros.	-	Director, 1 episode
1999	L.A. Heat	Frank Millan	1 episode
1999	Love Boat: The Next Wave	-	Director, 2 episodes
2001	Cody: An Evening with Buffalo Bill	-	Director
2001	Dharma & Greg	-	Director, 2 episodes
2002	The Hughleys	Mr. Henderson	1 episode
2002	Scrubs	Mr. Blair	1 episode
2003	Half & Half	Repairman	1 episode
2004	Eve	-	Director, 1 episode
2004–2005	Drake & Josh	Mr. Calvert	2 episodes
2005	All of Us	-	Director, 1 episode
2005	The King of Queens	Himself	1 episode
2007	General Hospital	Judge	2 episodes
2008	Psych	Pookie	1 episode
2010	The Cleveland Show	Himself (voice)	1 episode
2011	A Russell Peters Christmas	Himself	1 episode
2011–2012	Are We There Yet?	Ad Director / Captain	2 episodes; also director
2012	Betty White's Off Their Rockers	Various characters	Main cast
2012–2015	Mr. Box Office	Director, 33 episodes	
2012–2013	The First Family	-	Director, 23 episodes
2014	Maron	Wise Stranger	1 episode
2022	The Real Love Boat	Himself	
Video Games
Year	Title	Voice	Notes
1996	You Don't Know Jack Volume 2	Himself	
