= Saul Turteltaub =

American television writer (1932–2020)

Saul Turteltaub (May 5, 1932 – April 9, 2020) was an American comedy writer and producer. He was nominated for Emmy Awards in 1964 and 1965 as part of the writing team for That Was the Week that Was, and in 1968 for The Carol Burnett Show. Most commonly working with collaborator Bernie Orenstein, he wrote and produced That Girl, Sanford and Son (and its spin-offs Grady and Sanford Arms), What's Happening!!, Baby Talk, and Kate & Allie, among others.

== Early life ==
Born in Teaneck, New Jersey, Turteltaub was raised in nearby Englewood. Turteltaub attended Columbia University, and received his bachelor's degree and then, in 1957, his law degree. He served in the Army.

== Personal life ==
He married Shirley in 1960 and had sons named Adam and Jon. His sister-in-law was actress Fritzi Burr.

Turteltaub died at his home in Beverly Hills, California in April 2020, at the age of 87.
