= Haywood Nelson =

American actor (born 1960)

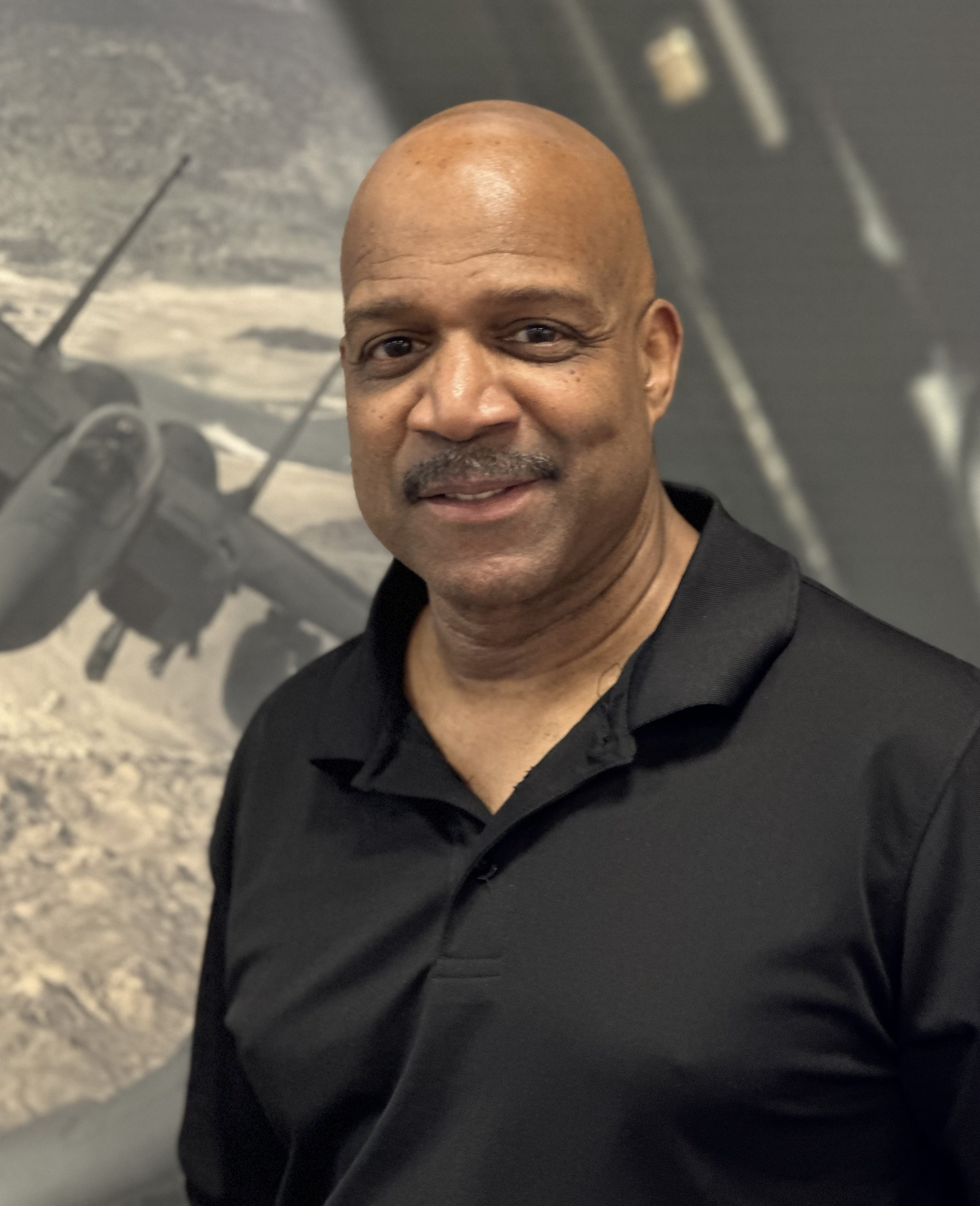
- Nelson in 2025
- Born: Haywood Knowles Nelson Jr. March 25, 1960 (age 66); New York City, New York, U.S.
- Occupation: Actor
- Years active: 1974–present
- Spouse(s): Sheryl Piland (m.1981; div.1984); Diana Ramos (m.1987; div.1998); Khnadya Skye (2014–2020); Paula DeJesus (2023–present)
- Children: 3

Haywood Knowles Nelson Jr. (born March 25, 1960) is an American actor. He is best known for having portrayed Dwayne Nelson in the television series What's Happening!!, which aired from 1976 to 1979, as well as in its spin-off series What's Happening Now!!, from 1985 to 1988.

== Biography ==
Haywood Nelson has been a member of the entertainment community for over forty years. Born in New York, he began his career at the age of six with numerous principal on-camera and voice-over national commercials, including Lavoris, Campbell's Soup, Libby's, Polaroid, Hot Wheels, Rock'em Sock'em Robots, Johnny Lightning, Aurora AFX, Kodak, Duncan Hines, Milk, Burger King, and Dean Witter.

Nelson appeared as a co-star in several feature films, including If You Give a Dance, You Gotta Pay the Band, Mixed Company, This Property Is Condemned, and a featuring role in Evilspeak. Haywood also spent a two-year run on Broadway in Thieves. Nelson guest starred on Kojak in the episode "The Godson" as Bobby Moore. At the age of 14, he went on to guest star in the television series Sanford and Son as the grandson of Whitman Mayo's Grady then acting in the series of the same name, Grady in 1975. The next year, in 1976, at the age of 16, Haywood soon landed the role of "Dwayne" in the television series "Cooley High," which became the ABC hit series What's Happening!! for TOY Productions. As a "teenage heartthrob" on a popular television series, Nelson was one of the first Black teen idols. After three seasons, Nelson went on to a short run on the television series The White Shadow for MTM Enterprises. Haywood had his studies in Architectural Design and Electronics Engineering interrupted when the cast of What's Happening!! was re-united for three seasons of syndication in the series continuation What's Happening Now!! for Columbia Pictures Television where he also served as Technical Director. Haywood appeared in an urban dramatic Broadway production at New York's Lincoln Center Alice Tully Hall. He appeared as himself in the Paramount film Dickie Roberts and on The Parkers.

He is a devout Scientologist.

== Filmography ==
Year	Title	Role	Notes
1971–74	As the World Turns	Jerry Smith	
1974	Mixed Company	Freddie	Feature film
1975	Sanford and Son	Haywood Marshall	Episode: "The Family Man"
1975–76	Grady	Haywood Marshall	Main cast (10 episodes)
1976–79	What's Happening!!	Dwayne Nelson	Main cast (65 episodes)
1977	Kojak	Bobby Moore	Episode: "The Godson"
1977	The Brady Bunch Hour	Dwayne Nelson	Episode #1.8
1979	The White Shadow	Randy Judd	Episode: "Sudden Death"
1981	Evilspeak	Kowalski	Feature film
1983-84	That Teen Show	Haywood Nelson	Co-host
1985–88	What's Happening Now!!	Dwayne Nelson	Main cast (66 episodes)
1990	Dragnet	Lyle Peters	Episode: "The Book"
2000	The Parkers	Himself (cameo)	Episode: "Whassup with Heyyy?"
2003	Dickie Roberts: Former Child Star	Himself (cameo)	Feature film
