= What's Happening!! =

American sitcom (1976–1979)

- S3 title screen
- Genre: Sitcom
- Created by: Eric Monte
- Based on: Cooley High
- Starring: Ernest Lee Thomas; Haywood Nelson; Fred Berry; Danielle Spencer; Mabel King (S1–2); Shirley Hemphill
- Music by: Henry Mancini
- Opening theme: "What's Happening!!"
- Country of origin: United States
- No. of seasons: 3
- No. of episodes: 65 (list of episodes)

Production
- Executive producers: Bernie Orenstein; Saul Turteltaub; Bud Yorkin
- Running time: 22–25 minutes
- Production companies: Bud Yorkin Productions (1976–1978) (seasons 1–2); TOY Productions (1976–1979) (seasons 1–3)

Original release
- Network: ABC
- Release: August 5, 1976 – April 28, 1979

Related
- What's Happening Now!!

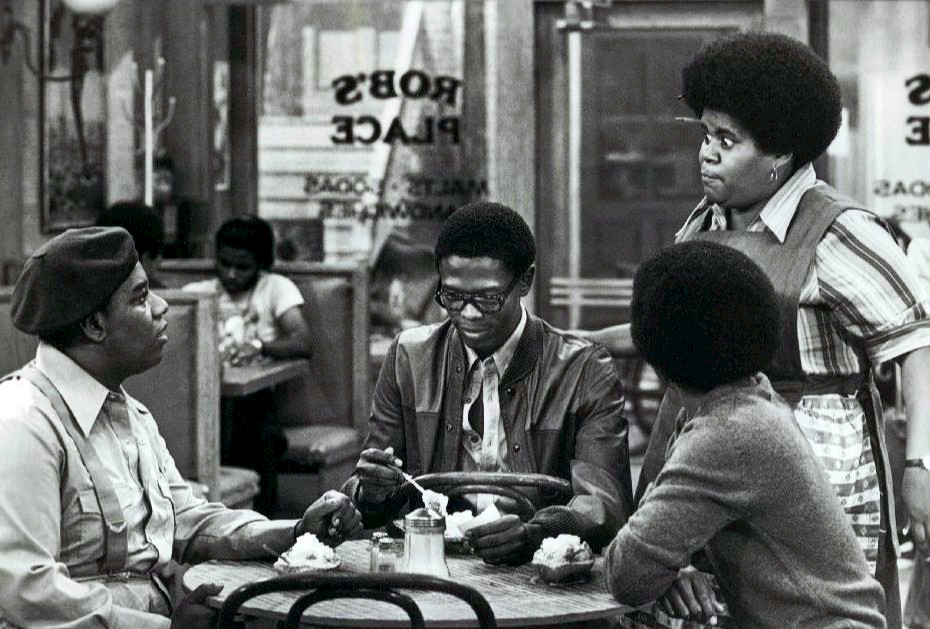
Seated, L–R: Fred Berry, Ernest Lee Thomas, and Haywood Nelson (back to camera). Standing: Shirley Hemphill

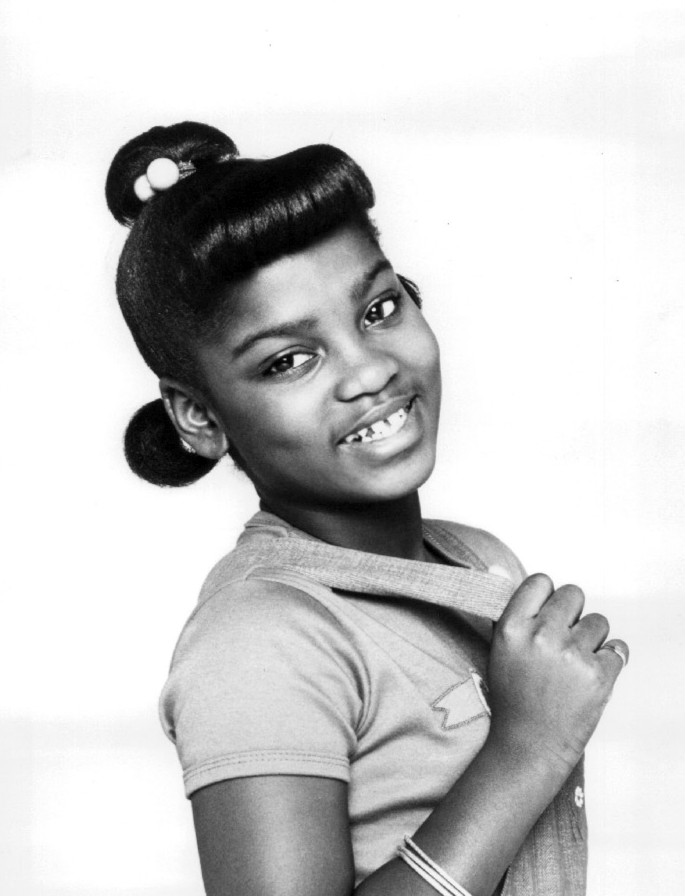
Danielle Spencer Spencer portrayed Raj's younger sister, Dee Thomas.

What's Happening!! is an American sitcom television series that first aired on ABC from August 5, 1976, premiering as a summer series. Thanks to the show's popularity, and with the failure of other shows, it eventually returned as a weekly series, that later aired for the rest of the three seasons, from November 13, 1976, to April 28, 1979. Created by Eric Monte (of Good Times), What's Happening!! was loosely based on the film Cooley High. It was television's first African-American show that dealt with teenagers, which was also a groundbreaking sitcom.

From September 7, 1985, to March 26, 1988, a sequel series titled What's Happening Now!! aired in first-run syndication, with some of the major cast members reprising their roles.

What's Happening!! was Bud Yorkin's second series after he ended his partnership with Norman Lear and Tandem Productions. The show was produced by TOY Productions, which was formed by Yorkin, Saul Turteltaub and Bernie Orenstein, after their split.

== Premise ==
What's Happening!! follows the lives of three working-class African-American teens living in the Los Angeles neighborhood of Watts. The show stars Ernest Thomas as Roger "Raj" Thomas, Haywood Nelson as Dwayne Nelson, and Fred Berry as Freddy "Rerun" Stubbs. Additional costars include Danielle Spencer as Roger's younger sister Dee and Mabel King as Roger and Dee's mother Mabel. Shirley Hemphill stars as Shirley Wilson, a tough but lovable waitress at Rob's Place, the neighborhood soda shop where the boys are regular patrons. Recurring characters include Rob (Earl Billings), owner of Rob's Place; and Mrs. Collins (Fritzi Burr), a sardonic but caring history teacher and the sponsor of the school newspaper.

== Characters ==
=== Main characters ===
- Roger "Raj" Thomas (Ernest Thomas), the show's protagonist, is a teenager living in Watts with his divorced mother Mabel and his younger sister Dee, portrayed as a young man who often gets into trouble.
- Dwayne Nelson (Haywood Nelson) the youngest of the three friends, portrayed as affable but sometimes slow witted.
- Frederick J. "Rerun" Stubbs (Fred Berry) another of the three friends, an overweight, humorous boy.
- Dee Thomas (Danielle Spencer) is Raj's sarcastic, meddling younger sister.
- Mabel Thomas (Mabel King) is Raj and Dee's overbearing, divorced mother.
- Shirley Wilson (Shirley Hemphill) is a wisecracking waitress at the neighborhood soda shop.

=== Recurring characters ===
- Bill Thomas (Thalmus Rasulala) is Mabel's ex-husband and the father of Roger and Dee.
- Gene "Rabbit" Walker (Ray Vitte) is a political science major at the University of Southern California, and a track team member.
- Detective "Big Earl" Barnett (John Welsh) is a police detective.
- "Little Earl" Barnett (David Hollander) is Big Earl's son.
- Rob (Earl Billings) is the owner of Rob's Place and Shirley's boss.
- Terry "Snake" Simpson (Leland Smith) is a star college basketball player whom Roger tutors in the third season.
- Mrs. Gertrude Collins (Fritzi Burr) is the boys' high school teacher.
- Marvin (Bryan O'Dell) is the boys' high school classmate and works for the school newspaper as a reporter.
- Diane Harris (Debbi Morgan) is another classmate of Roger, Dwayne, and Rerun.

== Production ==
The pilot episode, "The Birthday Present", was videotaped in front of a live audience at ABC Television Studios in the Los Feliz section of Los Angeles on March 16, 1976. Three additional episodes were videotaped that June, with the plan to release What's Happening!! as a short-duration "summer series" in August 1976. The first episode aired, "The Runaway", was actually the second episode taped, but was used as the premiere because it featured Fred Berry's dancing skills in a short scene.

The series was picked up after a successful summer run, and additional episodes were ordered for a November 1976 airdate. Production was moved from ABC to Golden West Videotape Division Studios, an older but larger facility, where it would remain for the rest of the series.

During the second season, Fred Berry demanded pay increases and improved studio accommodations for the actors by using the show's first season's success as leverage. The accommodations issue eventually led to a walkout by Berry and Thomas during the second-season episode "If I'm Elected" (leaving Haywood Nelson to carry the entire episode, with Shirley Hemphill stepping to the forefront, along with Bryan O'Dell and Debbi Morgan in featured speaking parts). Producer Bud Yorkin, in turn, suspended the pair and forced them to sign $25,000 promissory notes to return to the show and prevent further walkouts.

In addition, Mabel King offered producers input on her character and storylines during the second season, specifically that her character's ex-husband, Bill (Thalmus Rasulala), return full-time in order for the children to have (once again) married parents, showcasing what she felt would be a strong Black family. The producers did not incorporate King's suggestion, which resulted in additional tension on-set and a much-reduced role for King during the second season. Her character, Mama, was not written out of the show but rather limited to brief appearances on set (where she would say she was "leaving for work" or "going to the store") or mentioned in passing by other characters as being "at work".

== Series changes ==
The show changed significantly in the third season, with Raj and Rerun graduating from high school (Rerun after seven years, ostensibly due to a learning disability), with the two moving into their own apartment near the University of Southern California. Mabel King left the show; and Shirley moved into the Thomas household as a boarder. Also, several new recurring characters were introduced. The first was a basketball player whom Roger tutored and nicknamed "The Snake" (played by Leland Smith). The other characters were white police detective "Big Earl" Barnett (played by John Welsh) and his son "Little Earl" Barnett (played by David Hollander), who were neighbors in the apartment building where Roger and Rerun lived.

What became the role of "Little Earl" was initially created to be filled by ten-year-old Gary Coleman at the suggestion of ABC President Fred Silverman. Silverman was a proponent of Coleman and, feeling that breakout stardom was around the corner for the young talent, wanted him added to the show. When Silverman left ABC in 1978 to head rival network NBC, he had Diff'rent Strokes created for Coleman; it ran for eight years and was highly rated.

== Cancellation ==
During the third season (1978–79), Berry, still dissatisfied with his pay, again threatened to strike, and as a result he did not appear in the third-season episode "Dee, the Cheerleader". Thomas supported and joined Berry in his efforts, which led to a heated meeting with the executive producers, culminating with Berry accusing them of racism. Unable to come to terms, the producers opted to cancel the series.

What's Happening!! aired its last episode on April 28, 1979. A year later, Hemphill starred in her own sitcom, One in a Million, which premiered in January 1980 and ended on July 23, 1980, after being on ABC for several months.

== Ratings ==
What's Happening!! was a modest ratings success.

Season	Time slot (ET)	Rank	Rating
1976–1977	Thursday at 8:30–9:00 pm (Episodes 1–4, 10–21); Saturday at 8:30–9:00 pm (Episodes 5–9)	25	20.9
1977–1978	Thursday at 8:30–9:00 pm (Episodes 1–15, 22); Saturday at 8:00–8:30 pm (Episodes 16–20); Thursday at 8:00–8:30 pm (Episode 21)	42	N/A (Tied with Dallas and The Rockford Files)
1978–1979	Thursday at 8:30-9:00 pm (Episodes 1–12); Friday at 8:30–9:00 pm (Episodes 13–18); Saturday at 8:00–8:30 pm (Episodes 19–22)	28	19.8 (Tied with Monday Night Football)

== Success and What's Happening Now!! ==
What's Happening!! was widely syndicated in the 1980s. Appealing to both children and adults in a similar way to The Brady Bunch and Happy Days, it accordingly aired during transitional hours where stations would change their after-school programming from cartoons to evening sitcoms. In many markets, What's Happening!! garnered higher ratings in reruns than during its initial broadcast.

With this success in mind, a spinoff of the show was produced, entitled What's Happening Now!!, airing from 1985 to 1988.

== Home media ==
Sony Pictures Home Entertainment has released all three seasons of What's Happening!!

On August 27, 2013, it was announced that Mill Creek Entertainment had acquired the rights to various television series from the Sony Pictures library including What's Happening!! On September 2, 2014, they re-released the first two seasons on DVD.

On April 21, 2015, Mill Creek released a budget-priced complete series set, a 6-disc set featuring all 65 episodes.

DVD name	Ep #	Release date
The Complete 1st Season	21	February 3, 2004; September 2, 2014 (re-release)
The Complete 2nd Season	22	October 5, 2004; September 2, 2014 (re-release)
The Complete 3rd Season	22	August 23, 2005
The Complete Series	65	June 10, 2008; April 21, 2015 (re-release)

== Syndication ==
The show was syndicated on many local channels (with all 66 episodes of sequel series What's Happening Now!! joining the syndication package in the fall of 1988 to total 131 episodes) and continued in an on-again, off-again manner until 2009.

BET reran both series from September 20, 1993, to October 27, 1995.

TV Land reran the show during the 2005–2006 season.

As of March 1, 2013, cable network TV One shows reruns of What's Happening!!

On December 2, 2013, the newly rebranded Encore Black channel started airing What's Happening!!

Starting January 2, 2017, the digital broadcast network Antenna TV began airing the original series.

As of August 3, 2026, the original series is available to stream on the streaming television service Tubi.
