= List of Amen episodes =

The following is a list of episodes of the American sitcom Amen, which aired from September 27, 1986, until May 11, 1991, on NBC. 110 episodes have aired over five seasons.

== Series overview ==
Season	Episodes	Originally released	
Season	Episodes	First released	Last released
1	22	September 27, 1986	April 4, 1987
2	21	October 3, 1987	May 7, 1988
3	22	October 8, 1988	April 22, 1989
4	23	September 23, 1989	April 7, 1990
5	22	November 17, 1990	May 11, 1991

== Episodes ==
=== Season 1 (1986–87) ===
No. overall	No. in season	Title	Directed by	Written by	Original release date	Rating/share (households)
1	1	"Pilot"	Stan Lathan	Ed. Weinberger	September 27, 1986	20.3/36
Deacon Ernest Frye (Sherman Hemsley) hires a new minister, Reverend Reuben Gregory (Clifton Davis), for the First Community Church of Philadelphia, and the two argue over a young basketball player's future. Note: Maria McDonald, E'Lon, and Franklyn Seales are credited as cast members in this episode only.
2	2	"The Courtship of Bess Richards"	Herbert Kenwith	Bob Ellison	October 4, 1986	21.7/38
Deacon Frye tries to woo a talented singer (Nell Carter) to sing for the church, but she misunderstands his intentions and thinks he's interested in marriage - and does not take it well when she finds out the truth.
3	3	"The Morning After"	Lee Shallat	Peter Noah	October 11, 1986	20.7/35
After getting drunk during dinner, Reverend Gregory kisses Deacon Frye's daughter Thelma (Anna Maria Horsford), and has to explain himself to her once he recovers.
4	4	"The Deacon Delivers"	Lee Shallat	Peter Noah	November 1, 1986	19.6/34
Reverend Gregory has to tell an unwed mother-to-be that she can't sing in the choir, and she ends up delivering her baby with the help of a squeamish Deacon Frye.
5	5	"Rolly Falls in Love"	Jules Lichtman	Bob Ellison	November 8, 1986	21.6/36
Deacon Frye tries to help church elder Rolly Forbes (Jester Hairston) find out if a waitress (Paula Kelly) likes him or not, but Frye decides to make a date with her himself, and gets trapped in her house when her husband comes home.
6	6	"Retreat, Heck!"	John Robins	David Lloyd	November 15, 1986	20.4/34
Deacon Frye decides to go to a church retreat so that he can avoid an angry former client, who is now getting out of jail.
7	7	"Sermon From the Cell"	Bill Foster	Scott Spencer Gorden	November 22, 1986	19.5/33
The Reverend is jailed for a week after giving sanctuary to refugees and uses his time to minister to a convict.
8	8	"Maitre D'eacon"	John Robins	David Lloyd	November 29, 1986	19.0/30
A church member leaves bequeaths her restaurant to them with the stipulation that they cannot sell it as long as it is successful.
9	9	"Reuben's Romance"	Lee Shallat	Jace Richdale	December 6, 1986	19.5/33
Reverend Gregory has a guilty conscience after a widow he is consoling becomes a little more to him. Lynne Moody, who co-starred with Clifton Davis and Jester Hairston in That's My Mama guest-stars.
10	10	"After the Fall"	John Robins	Bob Ellison	December 13, 1986	18.9/32
After Rolly falls at the bank, the Deacon makes sure Rolly is awarded a settlement, but Rolly refuses it.
11	11	"Your Christmas Show of Shows"	Lee Shallat	Maiya Williams	December 20, 1986	19.5/35
Church members work hard to try and finish the preparations for the Christmas pageant which could end up on TV, but snow dampens the festive mood.
12	12	"Frye for the Defense"	Bill Duke & Herbert Kenwith	David Lloyd	January 10, 1987	20.3/32
A fund-raiser replete with rigged games, tainted salad and a lawsuit against the church brings more trouble than reward for the good Reverend.
13	13	"Thelma's Choice"	Bill Foster	Peter Noah	January 17, 1987	20.5/33
The new man in Thelma's life seems like Mr. Right to everyone, even the Deacon.
14	14	"Betting on the Boy"	Lee Shallat	David Lloyd	January 24, 1987	20.9/33
The Deacon is glad to be a Big Brother when he realizes his charge may help him win bets.
15	15	"Casting the First Stone"	John Robins	David Lloyd	February 7, 1987	18.5/31
The church is in conflict when Lorenzo testifies to a dalliance with a church member, just before the church hosts an interfaith dinner of brotherhood.
16	16	"Yes Sir, That's Your Baby"	Lee Shallat	Bob Ellison	February 14, 1987	18.7/31
The Hetebrink sisters adopt a baby, but an 18-year-old shows up.
17	17	"Into the Night"	Lee Shallat	Jace Richdale	February 21, 1987	19.5/33
Deacon Frye is stuck escorting Reverend Gregory's aunt out on the town, but winds up loosening her up too much so that she ends up in jail.
18	18	"The Divorce Lawyer"	Lee Shallat	David Lloyd	February 28, 1987	20.3/34
The Deacon devotes himself to his law practice when the board appoints Rolly as its new chairman.
19	19	"The Rival"	Lee Shallat	Peter Noah	March 7, 1987	18.1/31
Reverend Gregory falls in love with the new Sunday-school teacher, leaving Thelma heartbroken.
20	20	"The Magician"	Lee Shallat	David Lloyd	March 14, 1987	18.9/32
The Deacon's magic act flops before the church board, which is selecting entertainment for a charity bash, but it impresses a burglar out to rob the choir hall.
21	21	"Glen Garry Glen Thelma"	Lee Shallat	Jace Richdale	March 21, 1987	16.8/29
Thelma may lose a big commission as a real-estate agent thanks to the Deacon.
22	22	"What's Up, Deacon?"	Lee Shallat	Gary Dontzig & Steven Peterman	April 4, 1987	18.2/31
The Deacon turns over a new leaf in an effort to be the church's nominee for a humanitarian award, which could win him and Thelma a trip to the Holy Land.

=== Season 2 (1987–88) ===
No. overall	No. in season	Title	Directed by	Written by	Original release date	Rating/share (households)
23	1	"California Dreaming"	Bill Foster	Geoff Gordon & Gordon Lewis	October 3, 1987	18.7/34
Reverend Gregory takes a new pastorship in California with perks not available at First Community Church, but he quickly realizes his heart is in Philadelphia.
24	2	"Dancing in the Dark"	Bill Foster	Story by : Paul Chitlik & Jeremy Bertrand Finch; Teleplay by : Eric Cohen	October 17, 1987	15.8/28
The Deacon accepts an offer to work for his old law school rival and finds the man as competitive as ever.
25	3	"You Bet Your Life"	Bill Foster	Richard Marcus	October 24, 1987	20.2/36
After winning a new car in the church raffle, Amelia's gambling addiction returns and it takes the Reverend and Frye to save her from it.
26	4	"Dueling Ministers"	Bill Foster	Bob Ellison	October 31, 1987	15.9/29
Reverend Gregory finds himself in competition when a twelve-year old minister joins the church and is instantly loved by the congregation.
27	5	"Thelma's Reunion"	Bill Foster	Story by : Darice Rollins; Teleplay by : Arthur Julian, Bill Davenport & Eric Cohen	November 7, 1987	19.1/35
Thelma is reluctant to attend her high school reunion, until Frye convinces the Reverend to be her escort; meanwhile, Frye helps Amelia with an IRS audit. Note: Berlinda Tolbert, who portrayed Sherman Hemsley's daughter-in-law Jenny on The Jeffersons, portrays Thelma's high school friend.
28	6	"Deacon on the Line"	Bill Foster	William C. Kenny	November 14, 1987	17.8/32
The Deacon counsels a troubled teen (Robert MacNaughton) who phones in.
29	7	"Rolly's Proposal"	Bill Foster	Arthur Julian & Bill Davenport	November 21, 1987	18.0/31
Rolly falls in love with Thelma's Aunt Leola (Rosetta Lenoire) but if she marries him, she will lose her trust fund due to a clause in her husband's will.
30	8	"Rolly's Wedding"	Bill Foster	Bob Ellison	November 28, 1987	18.3/32
Frye reluctantly agrees to pay for Rolly and Leola's wedding, but a misunderstanding may keep Rolly from walking down the aisle. Continues from "Rolly's Proposal'.
31	9	"Thelma's Birthday"	Bill Foster	William C. Kenny	December 5, 1987	19.0/33
Thelma laments another lonely birthday, but ends up with two dates, including the Reverend, whose efforts to make Thelma's birthday happy pale compared to those of her other suitor.
32	10	"Thelma's Little Girl"	Bill Foster	Arthur Julian & Bill Davenport	December 12, 1987	16.7/26
Thelma is excited when she learns she will be a foster mother -- until her foster daughter tests her desire and resolve to parent.
33	11	"The Twelve Songs of Christmas"	Bill Foster	Eric Cohen	December 19, 1987	18.0/34
The Church Choir brings joy to the Christmas festivities as well as Leola and Rolly.
34	12	"Snakes Alive"	Bill Foster	Story by : Lisa Rosenthal; Teleplay by : Arthur Julian & Bill Davenport	January 2, 1988	19.6/34
Deacon Frye tries to help Reverend Gregory overcome his fear of snakes.
35	13	"Man on a Ledge"	Bill Foster	Arthur Julian & Bill Davenport	January 16, 1988	19.0/32
Thelma regrets leaving an amorous message on Reverend Gregory's answering machine.
36	14	"To Catch a Thief"	Bill Foster	Arthur Julian, Bill Davenport & Eric Cohen	January 23, 1988	17.4/30
Thelma's foster daughter, Jeanette, is suspected of being a thief after her collection box for a fundraiser comes up empty.
37	15	"The Widow"	Bill Foster & Phil Ramuno	Barbara Davilman	February 6, 1988	20.7/34
Reuben becomes the object of affection from a very lonely widow.
38	16	"Stranded"	Steve Zuckerman	Eric Cohen	February 20, 1988	14.0/22
Frye is overly appreciative after Amelia saves his life during a snowstorm.
39	17	"Deacon Dearest"	Bill Foster	Eric Cohen	February 27, 1988	14.2/22
The Deacon becomes interested in one of the parishes couples which are talking divorce after he learns that the husband is a millionaire.
40	18	"The Fantasy"	Phil Ramuno	Story by : James Tomkins; Teleplay by : Arthur Julian, Bill Davenport & Eric Cohen	March 5, 1988	17.8/31
Thelma and Reverend Gregory imagine what life would be like if they were married.
41	19	"Wedding Bell Blues"	Bill Foster	Jim Wells	March 12, 1988	18.2/32
The first couple Reverend Gregory married visit him for counseling, but when they decide to divorce, he is sued for malpractice.
42	20	"A Slight Case of Murder: Part 1"	Bill Foster	Arthur Julian & Eric Cohen	April 30, 1988	17.7/32
Deacon Frye defends a woman (Jackée) accused of murdering her husband and much to everyone's surprise, falls in love with her.
43	21	"A Slight Case of Murder: Part 2"	Bill Foster	Arthur Julian & Eric Cohen	May 7, 1988	19.4/36
Roxanne (Jackée) makes a surprising revelation after her wedding to Deacon Frye.

=== Season 3 (1988–89) ===
No. overall	No. in season	Title	Directed by	Written by	Original release date	Viewers (millions)
44	1	"Fear of Flying"	Bill Foster	Arthur Julian & Terry Hart	October 8, 1988	25.6
To get to a conference, the church board takes a private plane flown by a lone pilot, who loses consciousness in flight, unbeknownst to Thelma, who has temporarily conquered her fear of flying.
45	2	"Will You Still Love Me Tomorrow?"	Bill Foster	Lawrence Levy	October 22, 1988	20.7
The Reverend calls Thelma's bluff when she says she will start seeing other men unless he commits to her -- so she decides to go on a date with the Reverend's good friend (guest star Fred Williamson).
46	3	"Look at Me, I'm Running"	Bill Foster	Bob Ellison	October 29, 1988	21.7
The Deacon decides to run for State Senator and enlists the help of the church board as support staff.
47	4	"Court of Love"	Bill Foster	Bill Daley	November 5, 1988	25.5
The Deacon can't keep his mind on the church business when a comely legal assistant (Loretta Devine) is working by his side on an insurance case.
48	5	"Get 'Em Up, Scout"	Bill Foster	Marshall Karp	November 12, 1988	24.4
A prestigious law firm offers Deacon Frye a job.
49	6	"The Minister's Wife"	Bill Foster	Eric Cohen	November 19, 1988	25.3
Thelma coordinates the Interfaith Brotherhood dinner to show the Reverend that she can be as accomplished as a fellow minister's wife, but a plumbing mishap sinks the success of the dinner.
50	7	"The Housekeeper"	Bill Foster	Arthur Julian & Terry Hart	November 26, 1988	27.6
Thelma tired of being treated like a domestic by her father moves out and goes to Gregory. And when people learn of this, they start to talk which could be touchy for Gregory. And Frye hires a housekeeper (Elsa Raven) who likes him.
51	8	"Thelma's Handyman"	Bill Foster	Bill Daley	December 3, 1988	26.3
A 19-year-old handyman (Cuba Gooding Jr.) asks Thelma on a date, and it's not long before the congregation gets the wrong idea about their relationship.
52	9	"The Deacon's Donkey"	Bill Foster	Kathleen McGhee-Anderson	December 10, 1988	25.6
Frye goes all out for the church's nativity scene by renting live animals, including a donkey that ends up deathly ill, almost ruining Frye's holiday spirit.
53	10	"Matchmaker, Matchmaker"	Shelley Jensen	Marshall Karp	January 7, 1989	27.5
Deacon Frye agrees to help a wealthy widower find a wife in exchange for a large donation to the church.
54	11	"I Remember Mama"	Bill Foster	Peter Noah	January 14, 1989	25.5
Deacon Frye recalls how he met Thelma's mother during the Korean War.
55	12	"The Reverend Ernest Frye"	Shelley Jensen	Bill Daley	January 28, 1989	24.5
Reverend Gregory becomes ill with the measles and has Thelma waiting on him hand and foot.
56	13	"The Green Card"	Bill Foster	Story by : Bill Daley, Kathleen McGhee-Anderson & Terry Hart; Teleplay by : Arthur Julian & Marshall Karp	February 4, 1989	28.9
Inga's fiancé flees on the day of their wedding.
57	14	"The Psychic: Part 1"	Bill Foster	Marshall Karp	February 11, 1989	26.7
Thelma consults a psychic about her future with Reverend Gregory (guest star Lonette McKee).
58	15	"The Psychic: Part 2"	Bill Foster	Marhsall Karp	February 18, 1989	27.5
The truth about Tanya DuBois' prediction is revealed, much to Thelma's relief.
59	16	"The Boxer"	Bill Foster	Arthur Julian & Terry Hart	February 25, 1989	26.5
The congregation thinks the Deacon must be punch-drunk for agreeing to manage boxer Windmill Pearson, until Windmill gets into the ring with a contender.
60	17	"Nothing But the Truth"	Bill Foster	Story by : J. Darlene Hayes; Teleplay by : Wayne Terwilliger	March 4, 1989	28.1
Reverend Gregory's mother (Jane White) arrives for a visit and romantically pursues the Deacon.
61	18	"Career Girl"	J.D. Lobue	Bill Daley	March 18, 1989	25.1
Thelma takes a job as a receptionist and earns a big promotion during her first week on the job.
62	19	"First Community Talent Show"	Bill Foster	Kathleen McGhee-Anderson	April 1, 1989	24.9
The church holds a talent show to raise money for charity.
63	20	"The Last Supper"	Bill Foster	Arthur Julian & Terry Hart	April 8, 1989	21.4
Deacon Frye schemes to have Reverend Gregory installed in a prestigious position on the Minister's council.
64	21	"Sing, Sister, Sing"	Bill Foster	Marshall Karp	April 15, 1989	21.2
When a record executive shows interest in Amelia, Frye assumes the role as her manager and promptly gets her a booking at the Stardust Club -- where the other live entertainers include female mud wrestlers.
65	22	"A Mind Is a Terrible Thing to Waste"	Bill Foster	Story by : Bill Daley, Kathleen McGhee-Anderson & Paris Qualles; Teleplay by : Arthur Julian, Marshall Karp & Terry Hart	April 22, 1989	17.4
Reverend Gregory and Deacon Frye try to help a wayward high-school student by showing him the importance of pursuing a college education.

=== Season 4 (1989–90) ===
No. overall	No. in season	Title	Directed by	Written by	Original release date	Viewers (millions)
66	1	"The Engagement"	Shelley Jensen	Arthur Julian & Eric Cohen	September 23, 1989	23.7
Prompted by Frye, Thelma gives the Reverend a one-hour ultimatum: propose marriage or the relationship is over.
67	2	"Where There's a Will"	Shelley Jensen	Marty Nadler	September 30, 1989	20.9
Frye's father-in-law is on his deathbed, but Frye is holding a grudge against him-- until he reveals Frye is the beneficiary of a million dollar will.
68	3	"I Can't Help Loving That Man of Mine"	Shelley Jensen	William Daley	October 14, 1989	18.8
Thelma encourages the Reverend to have dinner with the woman who once stood him up at the altar.
69	4	"Who Am I?"	Shelley Jensen	Arthur Julian & Eric Cohen	October 21, 1989	20.0
Thelma develops amnesia after a boating accident and no longer has feelings for the Reverend.
70	5	"Witness for the Defense"	Shelley Jensen	Arthur Julian & Eric Cohen	October 28, 1989	18.2
The Deacon discredits himself by mismanaging a murder suspect's defense.
71	6	"TV or Not TV"	Shelley Jensen	Wanda Griffin & Dexter Griffin	November 4, 1989	20.0
The Reverend's heroism in taking down a gang member puts him in the gang's cross hairs -- just before the church's first televised service.
72	7	"Don't Rain on My Shower"	Shelley Jensen	Marco Pennette	November 11, 1989	22.5
Thelma goes overboard at her bridal shower to impress her high-school nemesis with reports that she's living the good life (guest star Jackée).
73	8	"Thelma Says, I Do"	Shelley Jensen	Arthur Julian & Eric Cohen	November 18, 1989	24.2
It's Reuben and Thelma's wedding day. But when Reuben was about to say "I do", he passes out. Thelma wanting to get married so badly tries to find a way to get him to say "I do".
74	9	"You're in the Army Now"	Shelley Jensen	Story by : Christopher A. Berry & L.A. Michaels; Teleplay by : Marshall Karp	November 25, 1989	24.7
After her wedding to Reverend Gregory doesn't push through, Thelma joins the Army. And after a few days she wants to leave but can't. So Gregory and Frye go there to help her.
75	10	"Thelma and the D.I."	Shelley Jensen	Arthur Julian & Eric Cohen	December 2, 1989	22.6
Thelma comes to her dad's defense when he's insulted by a drill sergeant (guest star Richard Roundtree).
76	11	"Sergeant in Arms"	Shelley Jensen	Marty Nadler & Bill Daley	December 9, 1989	21.4
Thelma brings the Sergeant home to meet her family and friends and even agrees to jump out of a plane to impress him, but what's her answer when he proposes marriage?
77	12	"Thelma Frye, Dough Girl"	Shelley Jensen	Marshall Karp	December 16, 1989	24.2
Thelma is home for Christmas and in her new discipline, she demands that everything be perfect -- until a kitchen mishap destroys dinner.
78	13	"The Deacon vs. the U.S. Army"	Shelley Jensen	Marshall Karp	January 6, 1990	25.6
Thelma's wedding to Reverend Gregory may be put on hold when she receives orders to ship out to Germany.
79	14	"The Roast"	Shelley Jensen	Story by : Darice Rollins & Jeff Kaufman; Teleplay by : Darice Rollins	January 13, 1990	21.6
The deacon is being orated by his friends and family, which includes flashbacks from previous episodes. At the end, the deacon is actually having a dream.
80	15	"The Deacon and the Mother-in-Law"	Shelley Jensen	Arthur Julian & Eric Cohen	January 27, 1990	24.2
Thelma and Reuben blame each other when the Deacon takes Reuben's mother to a hotel room in Atlantic City.
81	16	"The Wedding"	Shelley Jensen	Marty Nadler, Bill Daley & Paris Qualles	February 3, 1990	26.7
Reverend Gregory assumes a dual role at his wedding to Thelma when their minister is unable to perform the ceremony.
82	17	"The Honeymoon"	Shelley Jensen	Bill Daley & Paris Qualles	February 10, 1990	22.0
Thelma and Reuben's plans for a romantic Hawaiian honeymoon are delayed.
83	18	"The Talent Show"	Shelley Jensen	Paris Qualles	February 12, 1990	15.5
The church's talent show features rap numbers, choir selections and poetry readings, plus a tribute to New York City philanthropist Mother Hale
84	19	"Moving In"	Shelley Jensen	Marshall Karp	February 17, 1990	22.1
Thelma hosts her first dinner party as Reverend Gregory's wife, but the evening ends in disaster when she sets fire to the kitchen.
85	20	"Deacon's Dilemma"	Shelley Jensen	Paris Qualles	February 24, 1990	23.6
The Deacon swears off defending sleazy clients after he falls for the new assistant minister, who looks to him for inspiration.
86	21	"Trouble in Paradise"	Shelley Jensen	Arthur Julian & Eric Cohen	March 3, 1990	20.1
Thelma worries that Reuben no longer finds her desirable, but he's too embarrassed to admit the real reason for his lack of passion.
87	22	"Who's Sorry Now?"	Shelley Jensen	Marty Nadler & Paris Qualles	March 17, 1990	18.3
Amelia sues Deacon Frye after getting hurt following an argument between them.
88	23	"The Deacon's Confession"	Shelley Jensen	Arthur Julian & Eric Cohen	April 7, 1990	17.6
Deacon Frye admits that he spent Thelma's dowry money, $25,000. Note: This is Barbara Montgomery's final episode of the series as Casietta Hetebrink.

=== Season 5 (1990–91) ===
No. overall	No. in season	Title	Directed by	Written by	Original release date	Viewers (millions)
89	1	"Love, Deacon Style"	Jules Lichtman	Barry Gurstein & David Pitlik	November 17, 1990	18.0
Reuben doesn't seem to notice Thelma's efforts to recapture the glow of their newlywed days.
90	2	"Two Men, One Woman and a Baby"	John Sgueglia	Robin Stein	December 1, 1990	13.5
An abandoned baby awakens Thelma's maternal instincts while the Deacon prepares for a visit from the IRS.
91	3	"Child's Play"	Jules Lichtman	Bob Peete	December 8, 1990	13.1
The Deacon means to prove that he can handle a roomful of kids by taking over the church's day-care center.
92	4	"Yo, Deak"	John Sgueglia	Robert Illes & James R. Stein	December 15, 1990	13.7
The Deacon, vying for a seat on the crime commission, offers a youth help in putting his life back on track.
93	5	"Miracle on 134th Street: Part 1"	Gary Shimokawa	Barry Gurstein & David Pitlik	December 22, 1990	18.3
Deacon Frye defends a man claiming to the Santa Claus.
94	6	"Miracle on 134th Street: Part 2"	Gary Shimokawa	Robert Illes & James R. Stein	December 22, 1990	18.3
Santa gives him a second chance, and Frye gets the charges against him dropped.
95	7	"Judge Deacon Frye"	Bob Lally	Ken Hecht	December 29, 1990	15.7
Thelma holds her first society luncheon fundraiser as Rev. Dr. Reuben Gregory. Deacon Frye gets appointed judge & rides on a power high only to experience the consequences negatively first hand at gun point.
96	8	"The Gospel Truth"	John Sgueglia	Jim Geoghan	January 5, 1991	16.6
Reuben's niece (Siedah Garrett) chooses to be a singer rather than a minister; Laryngitis affects Amelia's voice.
97	9	"Lights, Camera, Deacon"	John Sgueglia	Barry Gurstein & David Pitlik	January 12, 1991	16.8
Judge Frye eats up publicity while presiding over a trial involving the theft of a chicken recipe.
98	10	"Unforgettable"	Gary Shimokawa	Ken Hecht	January 19, 1991	16.4
Thelma doesn't understand when her father embarks on a May–December romance with a young environmentalist (guest star Halle Berry).
99	11	"Ernie and the Sublimes"	John Sgueglia	Barry Gurstein & David Pitlik	February 2, 1991	15.6
Ernest Frye is reunited with his '50s doo-wop group, the Sublimes, for a church benefit (guest stars Chubby Checker, Casey Kasem, and LaWanda Page).
100	12	"The Deacon's Slam Dunk"	John Sgueglia	Bill Streib	February 9, 1991	14.6
Deacon Frye becomes manager of a retired NBA star (Kareem Abdul-Jabbar) who falls in love with a church trustee (Roz Ryan).
101	13	"Three Men and a Hammer"	John Sgueglia	Barry Gurstein, Robert Illes, David Pitlik & James R. Stein	February 23, 1991	16.2
Frye asks a Reverend to speak at the service and his sermon inspires Clarence to drop out of school and pursue his dream of being a rapper like his idol (MC Hammer). In order to convince Clarence not to Frye tries to get Hammer to speak to him but they can't get in to see him. So he dresses up like a fan.
102	14	"Nothin' Says Lovin'..."	John Sgueglia	Robin Stein	March 2, 1991	14.7
Reuben learns the reason for Thelma's recent mood swings during their first anniversary dinner.
103	15	"My Fair Homeboy"	John Sgueglia	Robert Illes & James R. Stein	March 9, 1991	15.4
Deacon Frye lines up a business deal which is endangered when Clarence begins dating the partner's daughter.
104	16	"A Star Is Burned"	John Sgueglia	Allison Abner & Darice Rollins	March 23, 1991	15.5
Thelma is offered a television cooking show based on a meal she served, actually prepared by Amelia (guest star John Hancock).
105	17	"Deak-Scam"	Michael Dimich	Darice Rollins	March 30, 1991	14.8
Prior to becoming a member, Deacon Frye blunders into a sting operation at a country club.
106	18	"The Wild Deak"	John Sgueglia	Bob Peete	April 6, 1991	13.0
While Deacon Frye, Brother Rolley & friend are out riding motorcycles trying make memorable moments to tell his grandchild he gets into a scuffle with 2 tough bikers with a surprising outcome. Meanwhile at home, Thelma has reached her limit with Reuben's overly zealous excitement about the pregnancy & his attempts at making the experience joyful.
107	19	"Three's a Crowd"	John Sgueglia	Jim Geoghan	April 13, 1991	14.5
Reverend Gregory tries to sympathize with Thelma during her pregnancy.
108	20	"Date With an Angel"	John Sgueglia	Barry Gurstein & David Pitlik	April 27, 1991	12.9
Darla (LaWanda Page), recently separated from her jealous husband (Whitman Mayo), purchases Ernest Frye at a charity auction.
109	21	"Deliverance: Part 1"	John Sgueglia	Jim Geoghan	May 4, 1991	13.5
Deacon Frye and Clarence do some fund-raising while double-dating; Reuben has pre-birth nerves.
110	22	"Deliverance: Part 2"	John Sgueglia	Robert Illes & James R. Stein	May 11, 1991	12.9
Thelma outshrieks her father and guest star (James Brown) in a "scream-off" when she goes into labor on a telethon.
