= Flo (TV series) =

American sitcom (1980–1981)

- Genre: Sitcom
- Based on: Character by Robert Getchell
- Written by: Tom Biener; John Boni; David Brown; Dick Clair; George Geiger; Robert Getchell; Phillip Harrison Hahn; Bob Illes; Ron Landry; Jenna McMahon; Stephen A. Miller; Richard Orloff; James R. Stein
- Directed by: Marc Daniels; Bob LaHendro; Dick Martin
- Starring: Polly Holliday; Geoffrey Lewis; Jim B. Baker; Stephen Keep; Sudie Bond; Lucy Lee Flippin
- Theme music composer: Susan Glicksman; Fred Werner
- Opening theme: "Flo's Yellow Rose" performed by Hoyt Axton
- Ending theme: "Flo's Yellow Rose" (instrumental)
- Composer: Fred Werner
- Country of origin: United States
- Original language: English
- No. of seasons: 2
- No. of episodes: 29

Production
- Executive producer: Jim Mulligan
- Producers: Tom Biener; George Geiger; Bob Illes; James R. Stein
- Production locations: The Burbank Studios; Burbank, California
- Camera setup: Multi-camera
- Running time: 24 min
- Production company: Warner Bros. Television

Original release
- Network: CBS
- Release: March 24, 1980 – June 30, 1981

Related
- Alice

Flo is an American sitcom television series and a spin-off of Alice that aired on CBS from March 24, 1980, to June 30, 1981. The series starred Polly Holliday reprising her role as sassy and street-smart waitress Florence Jean "Flo" Castleberry who returns to her hometown of Fort Worth, Texas—referred to as "Cowtown"—and becomes the proprietor of a rundown old roadhouse that she renames "Flo's Yellow Rose". Although the series started strong—in the Top 10 during its short first season run—repeated timeslot changes resulted in it falling out of the Top 40 shows by mid-March 1981. It was subsequently not renewed when CBS announced its 1981 fall lineup at the May upfronts.

== Synopsis ==
After several years as a waitress at Mel's Diner in Phoenix, Flo is on her way to a new restaurant hostess job in Houston, Texas, as described in her final appearance on Alice, "Flo's Farewell" (season 4, episode 18). She stops to visit her family in her hometown of Cowtown, Texas, (Cowtown is the popular nickname of Fort Worth) and in a fit of nostalgia, Flo buys a rundown old roadhouse she had enjoyed in her formative years and renames it "Flo's Yellow Rose". Coping with chauvinistic bartender Earl (Geoffrey Lewis) and the greedy and obnoxious banker Farley (Jim B. Baker) who holds the mortgage, as well as her mother Velma (Sudie Bond) and straight-laced sister Fran (Lucy Lee Flippin), causes most of the conflict in the series.

The rest of Flo's staff at the Yellow Rose includes her childhood best friend Miriam (Joyce Bulifant) as waitress/bookkeeper, and chain-smoking piano player Les (Stephen Keep). Randy, the mechanic (Leo Burmester) who worked at the garage next door, and Chester (Mickey Jones), were regular customers. Vic Tayback made one guest appearance as Mel Sharples from Alice. Once Flo began, Polly Holliday never appeared again on Alice, except in flashback clips in the last episode.

== Cast ==
- Polly Holliday as Florence Jean "Flo" Castleberry
- Geoffrey Lewis as Earl Tucker
- Jim B. Baker as Farley Waters
- Sudie Bond as Mama Velma Castleberry
- Leo Burmester as Randy Stumphill
- Joyce Bulifant as Miriam Willoughby
- Lucy Lee Flippin as Fran Castleberry
- Stephen Keep as Les Kincaid
- George Flower as Roy
- Mickey Jones as Chester
- Terry Willis as Wendell Tubbs (1980)

== Theme song ==
The theme song, "Flo's Yellow Rose," written by Fred Werner and Susie Glickman, was sung by Hoyt Axton who would co-star with Holliday in the 1984 film Gremlins. Axton would later guest-star in the episode "You Gotta Have Hoyt," as himself.

== Broadcast history ==
Flo was broadcast in these following timeslots during its two-season run on CBS:

- March 1980 – April 1980: Monday 9:30–10:00 p.m.
- July 1980 – January 1981: Monday 8:00–8:30 p.m.
- February 1981: Saturday 9:00–9:30 p.m.
- March 1981 – May 1981: Saturday 8:30–9:00 p.m.
- June 1981 – July 1981: Tuesday 8:30–9:00 p.m.

== Episodes ==
=== Season 1 (1980) ===
No. overall	No. in season	Title	Directed by	Written by	Original release date
1	1	"Homecoming"	Marc Daniels	Dick Clair & Jenna McMahon	March 24, 1980
On her way to a new restaurant hostess job in Houston, Flo gets a flat tire and ends up buying an old roadhouse in her hometown of Cowtown, Texas.
2	2	"Showdown at the Yellow Rose"	Marc Daniels	Stephen Miller	March 31, 1980
A showdown looms at sundown at the Yellow Rose between Earl and Bad Joe Shaw (Ben Davidson), whose girlfriend was stolen by Earl 17 years earlier.
3	3	"Happy Birthday, Mama"	Marc Daniels	Ron Landry, George Geiger and Tom Biener	April 7, 1980
Flo and Fran plan a surprise Hawaiian-theme birthday party for Mama at the Yellow Rose, including reuniting her with an old beau (Henry Jones).
4	4	"Take My Sister, Please"	Marc Daniels	Robert Illes & James Stein	April 14, 1980
Flo reluctantly hires her prim-and-proper sister Fran to work at the Yellow Rose, but she turns out to be so obnoxious that nobody in the bar can stand her – especially Flo.
5	5	"The Hero of Flo's Yellow Rose"	Marc Daniels	Rich Orloff	April 21, 1980
Les saves Farley from choking to death and when Flo calls a radio station to suggest him for its "Citizen of the Week" award, Les mysteriously disappears.
6	6	"The Reunion"	Marc Daniels	Rich Orloff	April 28, 1980
Flo is reunited with an old high school beau (Arlen Dean Snyder) who makes an offer to travel the world and share his wealth with her sound very tempting.

=== Season 2 (1980–81) ===
No. overall	No. in season	Title	Directed by	Written by	Original release date
7	1	"The Enemy Below"	Marc Daniels	Tom Biener, George Geiger & Ron Landry	October 27, 1980
A skunk has stationed itself under the Yellow Rose, driving customers out and Flo into battle against the critter to save the Yellow Rose from bankruptcy.
8	2	"Farley, the People's Choice"	Dick Martin	Stephen A. Miller	November 3, 1980
Farley is elected zoning commissioner and, much to his disappointment, it is not all it is cracked up to be.
9	3	"Bull is Back in Town"	Bob LaHendro	Tom Biener, George Geiger & Ron Landry	November 17, 1980
Bull (G. W. Bailey), a wild and crazy prospector, comes to town on his annual binge – seeking a good drink, bath and a pretty woman – and insists that he's going to marry Flo.
10 11	4 5	"A Castleberry Thanksgiving"	Dick Martin	Bob Illes & James R. Stein	November 24, 1980
Flo invites her father (Forrest Tucker), who ran out on the family 30 years earlier, to spend Thanksgiving with the Castleberry clan.
12	6	"Willoughby vs. Willoughby"	Lee Lochhead	Phillip Harrison Hahn	December 1, 1980
Miriam wins a Yellow Rose lottery to accompany Flo on a free trip to Disney World, provided she can leave her husband and kids.
13	7	"So Long, Shorty"	Bob LaHendro	Bob Illes & James r. Stein	December 8, 1980
Flo vows to give "Shorty", a favorite customer, his dying wish – a wingding of a funeral at the Yellow Rose – but then she realizes they eulogized the wrong man.
14	8	"Deserted Islands"	Nick Havinga	Tom Biener, George Geiger & Ron Landry	December 15, 1980
After a quarrel with his father, Randy quits his job to become a country music star and moves into the storeroom of the Yellow Rose which Flo soon regrets.
15	9	"The Miracle of Casa de Huevos"	Marc Daniels	Tom Biener, George Geiger & Ron Landry	December 22, 1980
While on their way to the annual Snowflake Ball on Christmas Eve, an ice storm maroons Flo, Earl, Les – and Earl's expecting mare – in Earl's drafty old barn.
16	10	"Grey Escape"	Marc Daniels	Phillip Harrison Hahn	January 5, 1981
Mama runs away from home when Flo and Fran, determined that she should lead a more productive life, sign her up for every volunteer project in town.
17	11	"Pretty Baby"	Marc Daniels	Coslough Johnson	January 12, 1981
Flo's dream of winning the "Miss Rodeo Days" contest is almost spoiled when friends leave their seven-month-old baby in her care.
18	12	"Not with My Sister, You Don't"	Tony Mordente	Bob Illes & James R. Stein	January 26, 1981
Flo is worried when a vulnerable Fran attaches herself to Les after her longtime fiancé Wendell elopes with an exotic dancer.
19	13	"The Price of Avocados: Part 1"	Bob LaHendro	Tom Biener, George Geiger & Ron Landry	February 7, 1981
When Flo can't pay her rent, Farley threatens to take her trailer (which she put up for collateral to buy the Yellow Rose) but somebody beats him to it.
20	14	"The Price of Avocados: Part 2"	Bob LaHendro	Tom Biener, George Geiger & Ron Landry	February 14, 1981
Flo, in debt to Farley for the rent, has her house trailer disappear and secretly hidden in Earl's barn to keep Farley from getting his hands on it.
21	15	"Welcome to the Club"	Wesley S. Kenney	Bob Illes & James R. Stein	February 21, 1981
Flo's coarse brother torpedoes her efforts to impress a snooty businesswoman (Barbara Babcock) who is writing an article on the Yellow Rose.
22	16	"Gunsmoke at the Yellow Rose"	Bob LaHendro	John Boni	February 28, 1981
Flo borrows a few characters from Gunsmoke when she fantasizes an Old West shoot-out at the Yellow Rose as a roaring saloon in the 1880s.
23	17	"What Are Friends For?"	Bob LaHendro	Bob Illes & James R. Stein	March 14, 1981
Mel Sharples (Vic Tayback), Flo's former boss, visits the Yellow Rose and he gives her some unwelcomed advice on how to run a business.
24	18	"Just What the Doctor Ordered"	Bob LaHendro	Phillip Harrison Hahn	March 21, 1981
Flo gets tonsillitis and can't talk and Earl discovers her age through her birth certificate, but an anniversary edition of the newspaper mistakenly lists her birthdate as 1931.
25	19	"Footsie"	Bob LaHendro	David G.B. Brown	April 4, 1981
When Earl plans to take his birthday off to accompany a friend to a rodeo – he neglects to tell Flo that the friend is his ex-girlfriend, B.J. (Joanna Cassidy).
26	20	"You Gotta Have Hoyt"	Bob LaHendro	Phillip Harrison Hahn	April 11, 1981
Country-western singer Hoyt Axton visits the Yellow Rose to see if all the stories he has heard about Flo are true and she doesn't disappoint him.
27	21	"Flo's Encounter of the Third Kind"	Bob LaHendro	Phillip Harrison Hahn	April 18, 1981
Nobody believes Flo when she claims to have seen a flying saucer on her way home, and then she takes a skeptical Earl back there to camp out and wait for the UFO to return.
28	22	"No Men's Land"	Bob LaHendro	John Boni	June 23, 1981
Buddy (George Lindsey), who runs the gas station next to the Yellow Rose, tells Flo that the bathrooms in her bar are on his land and she has to pay for them.
29	23	"The Daynce"	Bob LaHendro	Tom Biener, George Geiger & Ron Landry	June 30, 1981
When Flo convinces Earl into escorting her to a formal ball marking her membership in an exclusive club, he helps her make a big impression, but not the kind she hoped for.

== Ratings ==
A cozy time slot following one of TV's biggest hits (M*A*S*H) on CBS Monday night (@ 9:30 pm) helped make the brief first season (spring 1980) a ratings success. The series ended the year ranked at No. 7 and averaged 24.4 million viewers per episode. The second season (Fall 1980) brought a reversal in fortune when CBS decided to move the show to an earlier time on the same night (8 pm) and have it face off against NBC's top-10 hit Little House on the Prairie. Without the lead-in support of M*A*S*H, a sharp decline in numbers followed, which kicked off a few different time slot changes over the course of the season (none of which helped), and CBS opted not to renew the series for a third season.

== Award nominations ==
- Nominated: 1980 Primetime Emmy Award – Outstanding Lead Actress in a Comedy Series (Polly Holliday)
- Nominated: 1981 Golden Globe Award – Best Performance by an Actress in a Television Series – Comedy or Musical (Polly Holliday)
- Nominated: 1981 Golden Globe Award – Best Supporting Actor in a Series, Miniseries or Motion Picture Made for Television (Geoffrey Lewis)

== Home media release ==
On November 5, 2013, Flo: The Complete Series was released on DVD in Region 1 by Warner Home Video via their Warner Archive Collection. This is a Manufacture-on-Demand (MOD) release available via WBShop.com & Amazon.com.

== Book ==
A book chronicling the development of the TV series Alice and Flo entitled Alice: Life Behind the Counter in Mel's Greasy Spoon (A Guide to the Feature Film, the TV Series, and More) was published by BearManor Media in September 2019. Flo was also considered in the book Single Season Sitcoms of the 1980s by Bob Leszczak, published by McFarland in 2016.
