= List of Private Benjamin episodes =

This is a list of episodes for the television series Private Benjamin.

== Series overview ==
Season	Episodes	Originally released		Rating
Season	Episodes	First released	Last released	Rating
1	4	April 6, 1981	April 27, 1981	—N/a
2	22	October 12, 1981	April 26, 1982	37
3	13	September 27, 1982	January 10, 1983	45

== Episodes ==
=== Season 1 (1981) ===
No. overall	No. in season	Title	Directed by	Written by	Original release date
1	1	"Benjamin to the Rescue"	Bob Sweeney	Don Reo	April 6, 1981
Fearing Private Benjamin will make the troops look bad during General Thrustmore (Charles Napier)'s visit, Captain Lewis tries unsuccessfully to keep her out of sight.
2	2	"Jungle Swamp Survival"	Bob Sweeney	Don Reo	April 13, 1981
Private Benjamin and the girls capture an AWOL soldier during their jungle survival course and return to the base as heroines.
3	3	"Party"	Bob Sweeney	Paul R. Hunter Jr.	April 20, 1981
When Private Benjamin decides she's going to throw a party, neither Captain Lewis, Army regulations, nor anything else can stop her.
4	4	"Captain's Helper"	Bob Sweeney	Judith D. Allison	April 27, 1981
Captain Lewis can barely cope when an experimental aide program is launched in their outfit and she finds herself with Private Benjamin as her personal aide for three days.

=== Season 2 (1981–82) ===
No. overall	No. in season	Title	Directed by	Written by	Original release date
5	1	"Judy in the Driver's Seat"	Marc Daniels	Garry Ferrier, Aubrey Tadman	October 12, 1981
Captain Lewis tries to cure Benjamin's clumsiness by appointing her squad leader.
6	2	"Judy Got Her Gun"	Marc Daniels	Bob Illes, James R. Stein	October 19, 1981
Captain Lewis bets $300 that Hubble will win a shooting match.
7	3	"So Long, Sergeant Ross"	Bruce Bilson	Garry Ferrier, Aubrey Tadman	October 26, 1981
Benjamin and Captain Lewis try to persuade Sergeant Ross to reenlist.
8	4	"Give Me Liberty: Part 1"	Howard Morris	Mike Weinberger	November 2, 1981
Benjamin's unit gets its first pass, and Gianelli refuses to go back after finding the man of her dreams. To be continued...
9	5	"Give Me Liberty: Part 2"	Howard Morris	Mike Weinberger	November 9, 1981
Benjamin tries to trick Gianelli into returning home before they're AWOL.
10	6	"For the Love of Judy"	Herbert Kenwith	Simon Muntner	November 16, 1981
A mess cook aims to marry Benjamin whether she wants to or not.
11	7	"Bye, Bye Benjamin"	Marc Daniels	Bob Illes, James R. Stein	November 30, 1981
Benjamin's mother and father (Barbara Barrie and William Daniels) come to the base with a plan to get their daughter out of the Army.
12	8	"Undercover Judy"	William Asher	Len Kaufman	December 7, 1981
Benjamin rigs a poker game to win back Sims' IOU from a loan shark.
13	9	"Gone with the Jeep"	William Asher	Max Katz, David Reiss, Andy Ruben, Toni Wunsch	December 21, 1981
Captain Lewis' life is in Benjamin's hands when their jeep crashes in the middle of the desert.
14	10	"A Bath for Benjamin"	Marc Daniels	Mark Tuttle	December 28, 1981
Sick of showers, Benjamin schemes to slip into Captain Lewis' house and use her bathbub, but she gets caught and ends up losing her towel in front of everyone.
15	11	"Man on the Floor"	Marc Daniels	Mark Tuttle	January 4, 1982
Hubble's boyfriend comes to visit and hides out in the girls' room. Hubble is on guard duty, so Benjamin figures out a way so he can talk with Hubble.
16	12	"Not for Men Only"	Gabrielle Beaumont	Bob Illes, James R. Stein	January 18, 1982
Benjamin bucks the system when Winter is refused assignment to a tactical squad because she's a woman.
17	13	"Moments to Remember"	Bruce Bilson	Nick Arnold	January 25, 1982
The end of boot camp spells relief for Captain Lewis — she's being promoted, transferred, and liberated from Benjamin forever. Or is she?
18	14	"I Wonder Who's Blackballing Her Now?"	Gabrielle Beaumont	Hank Bradford	February 1, 1982
Captain Lewis is denied promotion because of a black mark on her record put there by Colonel Fielding: Lewis once sent an entire division to Turkey for Thanksgiving instead of sending turkey dinners to the division.
19	15	"Are You Sure Mike Wallace Started Like This?"	Bruce Bilson	Nick Arnold	February 8, 1982
Benjamin spills her guts to an investigative TV reporter looking for proof of a chemical dump under Fort Bradley.
20	16	"Beauty and the Brass"	William P. D'Angelo	Nick Arnold	February 15, 1982
Sims is arrested for stealing gasoline, and a beautiful private (Rebecca Holden) accuses Colonel Fielding of sexual harassment.
21	17	"When It's Hot, It's Hot"	William Asher	Eric Cohen	March 1, 1982
Benjamin can't convince anyone that she saw a big missile smuggled onto the base.
22	18	"Reds and Blues"	Gabrielle Beaumont	Hank Bradford	March 15, 1982
Colonel Fielding goes up against Colonel Hogan (Craig T. Nelson) in the war games competition. The Inspector General's office (i.e., Captain Lewis) is in charge of refereeing. But Benjamin and the others overhear Colonel Hogan bribe Captain Lewis. Benjamin, Sergeant Ross and the others hatch a plan to make sure that Colonel Hogan loses so Captain Lewis won't get into trouble for taking the bribe.
23	19	"Profiles in Courage"	Gabrielle Beaumont	Eric Cohen	April 5, 1982
A man reports that he has a bomb in his living room, and a member of the Ordnance Disposal Unit is sent in to disarm it, but ends up blowing up the man's house instead.
24	20	"S*M*A*S*H"	William Asher	Nick Arnold	April 12, 1982
Lewis is letting her responsibilities slide and Benjamin is concerned.
25	21	"Me, Me, Me"	Gabrielle Beaumont	Nick Arnold, Eric Cohen	April 19, 1982
The influence of a self-assertiveness guru (Tim Thomerson) hinders preparation for a general's inspection.
26	22	"Real World"	Alan Myerson	Nick Arnold, Eric Cohen	April 26, 1982
Captain Lewis and Colonel Fielding attend a seminar on civilian life.

=== Season 3 (1982–83) ===
No. overall	No. in season	Title	Directed by	Written by	Original release date
27	1	"Astro-Chimp"	Leslie H. Martinson	Bob Brunner, Ken Hecht	September 27, 1982
An astro-chimpanzee is brought to the base, and Judy learns the next stop for the chimpanzee is an experimental lab. Judy attempts to save the chimpanzee's life, but almost finds herself court-martialed.
28	2	"Judy's Army"	Alan Cooke	Laura Levine	October 4, 1982
Private Benjamin, by computer error, is promoted to major, then general, over Colonel Fielding. Meanwhile, war games are in progress and Fielding is prepared to surrender his troops, but Benjamin has a plan.
29	3	"You Oughta Be in Pictures"	Bruce Bilson	Arnold Kane	October 11, 1982
A famous Hollywood director arrives at Fort Bradley to direct a women's recruiting film, and Captain Lewis is determined to be the film's star.
30	4	"Ross Versus the Robot"	Gabrielle Beaumont	Lynne Kelsey, Kenny Rich	October 18, 1982
When a robot is brought to the base for combat testing, Sergeant Major Ross fears this automation will put an end to his career. But Private Benjamin and her friends have a plan.
31	5	"Chariots of Ire"	Alan Bergmann	Lynne Kelsey, Kenny Rich	November 1, 1982
When Colonel Fielding learns that a general's daughter, who hates to lose, is competing against Fort Bradley in the upcoming track meet, he orders Captain Lewis to ensure her win. To guarantee the girl's victory, Lewis convinces Private Benjamin to enter the race.
32	6	"The Triangle"	Alan Cooke	Arnold Margolin	November 8, 1982
Judy and Stacy's friendship is almost destroyed when Stacy thinks Judy has stolen her boyfriend.
33	7	"Fielding's Crisis"	Alan Bergmann	Mara Lideks	November 15, 1982
After Colonel "Iron Man" Fielding is mugged and does not defend himself, he feels he is unfit to be a leader and decides to retire.
34	8	"Be All That You Can Be"	Tony Mordente	Linda Morris, Vic Rauseo	November 22, 1982
Private Benjamin wants to prove to Captain Allen that she is a good soldier, and almost dies doing so. With this episode, Polly Holliday joins the cast.
35	9	"The Talent Show"	Tony Mordente	Bob Brunner, Ken Hecht	November 29, 1982
When Fort Bradley holds its annual talent show for the children of a local orphanage, Captain Lewis becomes emotionally involved with a little boy who hasn't spoken since becoming an orphan.
36	10	"Tank's Soldier"	Leslie H. Martinson	Linda Morris, Vic Rauseo	December 13, 1982
When a soldier saves Captain Lewis' life, Private Benjamin persuades Colonel Fielding to publicize this act of heroism, only to find out the soldier is an illegal alien who has become a squatter on the base.
37	11	"Sacred Land"	Alan Cooke	Laura Levine	December 27, 1982
A Native American tribe declares that part of the base, where a gymnasium is being constructed, is their sacred burial ground. Colonel Fielding refuses to stop construction, and Private Benjamin comes to the rescue.
38	12	"Take My Mother, Please"	Arnold Margolin	Stephanie Garman, Hollace White	January 3, 1983
Judy's mother Harriet arrives at the base after leaving her husband. Colonel Fielding, hoping to gain a NATO command, decides to reunite the feuding couple.
39	13	"Judy's Cousin"	Tony Mordente	Bob Brunner, Ken Hecht	January 10, 1983
Private Benjamin's klutzy cousin Sherry is transferred to Fort Bradley, and immediately annoys Captain Allen.
