= Amen (TV series) =

American television sitcom (1986–1991)

- Genre: Sitcom
- Created by: Ed. Weinberger
- Starring: Sherman Hemsley; Clifton Davis; Anna Maria Horsford; Roz Ryan; Jester Hairston; Barbara Montgomery; Rosetta LeNoire; Elsa Raven; Tony T. Johnson; Montrose Hagins; Bumper Robinson
- Theme music composer: Andraé Crouch
- Opening theme: "Shine on Me" by Vanessa Bell Armstrong
- Composer: Bruce Miller
- Country of origin: United States
- Original language: English
- No. of seasons: 5
- No. of episodes: 110 (list of episodes)

Production
- Executive producers: James R. Stein; Bob Illes; David Lloyd; Arthur Julian; Ed. Weinberger
- Producers: Jim Geoghan; Marilynn Loncar; Peter Noah; Bob Peete
- Camera setup: Multi-camera
- Running time: 24 minutes
- Production companies: Carson Productions; Stein & Illes Productions

Original release
- Network: NBC
- Release: September 27, 1986 – May 11, 1991

Amen is an American television sitcom produced by Carson Productions that aired on NBC from September 27, 1986, to May 11, 1991. Set in Sherman Hemsley's real-life hometown of Philadelphia, Amen stars Hemsley as the deacon of a church and was part of a wave of successful sitcoms on NBC in the 1980s and early 1990s that featured predominantly black casts – others included The Cosby Show, A Different World, The Fresh Prince of Bel-Air, and 227.

The series also marked Sherman Hemsley's return to the television series since The Jeffersons concluded its eleventh-season run on CBS in 1985.

== Premise ==
The series stars Sherman Hemsley as Deacon Ernest Frye, of the First Community Church of Philadelphia. Frye, who works as a lawyer, is often dishonest and frequently gets into trouble with his many harebrained schemes. Anna Maria Horsford played Deacon Frye's 36-year-old single daughter, Thelma Frye. The Reverend Reuben Gregory, played by Clifton Davis, was the new, young pastor of the First Community Church, and also the object of Thelma's affection. The two eventually married during the fourth season, despite the fact that Reverend Gregory and Deacon Frye often butted heads. In the series finale, Thelma gives birth to the couple's first child.

The cast also included Jester Hairston as high-spirited and lively senior citizen Rolly Forbes, who often acted as the voice of reason. Davis and Hairston had previously worked together, playing Clifton and Wildcat on the 1970s sitcom That's My Mama. The show also starred comedienne Roz Ryan and Barbara Montgomery as Amelia and Cassietta Hetebrink, a pair of chattering sisters at the church. Also appearing on the show was Leola Henderson (played by Rosetta LeNoire), Rolly's love interest and eventual wife. After portraying Leola Forbes for two seasons, LeNoire left the show to star in the sitcom Family Matters as Grandma 'Mother' Estelle Winslow. LeNoire was replaced by Montrose Hagins who played the character from 1989 until the series' end in 1991.

For the third and fourth seasons, joining the cast were Elsa Raven as Swedish housekeeper Inga and Tony T. Johnson as Chris, a young boy that lived next door to Deacon Frye. In a running gag, Chris would visit the Frye home for various reasons and would say something outrageous that would cause one of the adults to pick him up and carry him out of the house. The character of Inga was dropped from the show in 1990, with no explanation given for her disappearance. Barbara Montgomery left the series in 1990 to star on ABC's Married People, but there was no explanation of her character's absence on the show. In the fifth and final season, Bumper Robinson joined the cast as Clarence, a young street kid and protégé of Deacon Frye.

== Cast and characters ==
- Sherman Hemsley as Ernest Frye, a widowed deacon of the First Community Church in Philadelphia. Ernest was also a personal injury lawyer and notorious ambulance chaser.
- Clifton Davis as the Reverend Doctor Reuben Gregory, the new pastor of the Community Church and Thelma's love interest and eventual husband
- Anna Maria Horsford as Thelma Frye Gregory, the Deacon's daughter and Reuben's eventual wife
- Roz Ryan as Amelia Hetebrink, the church secretary, Casietta's sister (both were chatterers and known as "the Hetebrink sisters")
- Jester Hairston as Rolly Forbes, an elder church member, who often acts as the voice of reason
- Barbara Montgomery as Casietta Hetebrink (1986–90), the church trustee, Amelia's sister. Barbara was the only original cast member to leave the series, she went on to star in ABC's Married People in 1990. Casietta mysteriously disappeared and was never talked about.
- Elsa Raven as Inga (1988–90), the Deacon's Swedish housekeeper
- Tony T. Johnson as Chris (1988–91), a young boy, the Deacon's neighbor
- Rosetta LeNoire as Leola Henderson Forbes (1987–89), Rolly's love interest and eventual wife
- Montrose Hagins as Leola Henderson Forbes (1989–91), Rolly's wife
- Bumper Robinson as Clarence (1990–91), a young street kid and protégé of Deacon Frye

== Exterior shot location ==
The Mount Pisgah African Methodist Episcopal Church in Powelton Village, Philadelphia, a stone gothic church building at 41st and Spring Garden Street, was used for exterior views of the First Community Church. Consequently, the Mount Pisgah Church became known to the nation as the "Amen Church".

== Episodes ==
Season	Episodes	Originally released	
Season	Episodes	First released	Last released
1	22	September 27, 1986	April 4, 1987
2	21	October 3, 1987	May 7, 1988
3	22	October 8, 1988	April 22, 1989
4	23	September 23, 1989	April 7, 1990
5	22	November 17, 1990	May 11, 1991

== Ratings ==
- 1986–1987: #13
- 1987–1988: #15
- 1988–1989: #25
- 1989–1990: #33
- 1990–1991: #65
