= William Missouri Downs =

American dramatist

William Missouri Downs, is a playwright, screenwriter, novelist, and textbook writer.

== Life and career ==
. Downs started as an actor, earning an MFA in acting from the University of Illinois, but a bout with viral encephalitis left him with a slight stammer and ended his acting career. So he moved to New York and studied playwriting at the Circle Rep Theatre under Lanford Wilson and Milan Stitt.

Downs then moved to Los Angeles and earned an MFA in screenwriting from UCLA. While a student at UCLA film school, he won numerous screenwriting awards, including the Jack Nicholson prize.

In Hollywood, Downs worked as a script secretary on NBC's Moonlighting and studied sitcom writing at the Warner Brothers Sitcom Writing Workshop. He was a staff writer on NBC's My Two Dads, with writing credits on four episodes, he was also credited with writing episodes for the NBC shows Amen and Fresh Prince Of Bel Air. In addition, he sold a movie to Ron Howard's Imagine Entertainment and optioned another to Filmways. He worked with Jim Parsons to develop a TV pilot that was optioned by Hollywood producer Meryl Poster.

Downs has written numerous plays, several of which have won awards. These include: The Exit Interview (which premiered at the Orlando Shakespeare), winner of a rolling premiere from the National New Play Network (NNPN); Women Playing Hamlet (which premiered at the Unicorn Theatre in Missouri), winner of a rolling premiere from NNPN; Mad Gravity, a finalist for Eugene O'Neill Award and winner of the Reva Shiner Comedy Award, premiering at the Bloomington Playwrights Project; Cockeyed winner of The Greenhouse Festival of New Plays; and Seagulls in a Cherry Tree, winner of the Larry Corse Prize for Playwriting.

There have been over 350 productions of his plays, including productions at the Orlando Shakespeare Theatre, the InterAct Theatre in Philadelphia, the San Diego Rep, the Berkeley Repertory Theatre, the Salt Lake City Acting Company, the Actors Theatre of Charlotte, the Jewish Theatre of Toronto, the Bloomington Playwright's Project, the Detroit Rep, and the New York City Fringe Festival.

His plays have been produced in Spain (Fuera de órbita), Canada, South Africa (Durban Performing Arts Center), Russia (Хороший парень - The Serov Theatre Drama After Chekhov, Serov), Singapore (The Hexis Theatre), Switzerland (Franklin University, Lugano,), Austria (stadt Theater walfischgasse, Vienna), Israel (The International Theatre Festival), India (Alliance Francaise de Bangalore, Bangalore), and South Korea (피카소를 훔치는 법 & 실제 게임 at Theatre in Daehangno & Daehakro Theatre, Seoul).

Downs has an extensive publication record including articles, plays, novels, and textbooks. He has co-authored four books, including Naked Playwriting (Silman/James), Playwriting: From Formula to Form (Harcourt Brace), Screenplay: Writing the Picture (Silman/James), and The Art of Theatre (Wadsworth/Cengage). The Art of Theatre has gone through multiple editions and has been adopted as a college textbook in the US.

== Awards ==
Downs has won two rolling premieres from the National New Play Network and has twice been a finalist at the Eugene O'Neill. He also won the Beverly Hills Theatre Guild Julie Harris Award.

== Plays ==
- Kosher Lutherans, published by Samuel French
- Women Playing Hamlet, published by Playscripts
- Mr. Perfect, published by Playscripts
- Mad Gravity, published by Playscripts
- Cockeyed, published by Samuel French
- Forgiving John Lennon
- Dead White Males, published by Playscripts
- The Exit Interview, published by Samuel French
- Headsets - A View from the Light Booth, published by Heuer Publishing
- Seagulls in a Cherry Tree, published by Heuer Publishing
- Innocent Thoughts, published by Next Stage Press
- Fascism the Musical
- Life on my Knees
- How to Steal a Picasso
- Angry Psycho Princesses (the musical)
- You Can't Say That!
- How to Survive Your Family at Christmas

== Books ==
- Downs, William Missouri; Wright, Lou Anne (14 August 1997). Playwriting: From Formula to Form. Wadsworth Publishing. ISBN 0-15-503861-3.
- Russin, Robin U.; Downs, William Missouri (July 2003). Screenplay: Writing the Picture. Silman-James Press. ISBN 1-879505-70-3.
- Downs, William Missouri; Russin, Robin U. (28 January 2005). Naked Playwriting: The Art, the Craft, and the Life Laid Bare. Silman-James Press. ISBN 1-879505-76-2.
- Russin, Robin U.; Downs, William Missouri (14 September 2005). Jak napisać scenariusz filmowy (in Polish). Wojciech Marzec. ISBN 83-922604-0-6.
- Downs, William Missouri; Wright, Lou Anne; Ramsey, Erik (2011). The Art of Theatre. Belmont, CA: Thomson Wadsworth. ISBN 978-0-15-506325-9.

== Monologues and short plays ==
- Books on Tape, published by North West Theatre Review, Oregon State University (2008)
- Exceptional Monologues, published by Samuel French, New York (2009)
- The Best Women's Stage Monologues of 2016, published by Smith And Kraus (2011)
- 222 Comedy Monologues, published by Playscripts (2016)
- Contemporary Scenes For Twentysomethings, Applause Books (2017)
- Contemporary Monologues For Twentysomethings, Applause Books (2018)
- Actor's Choice Monologue, published by Playscripts, New York
