= Private Benjamin (TV series) =

American sitcom (1981–1983)

- Genre: Sitcom
- Based on: Private Benjamin
- Developed by: Don Reo
- Directed by: William Asher; Charles Beaumont; Gabrielle Beaumont; Alan Bergmann; Bruce Bilson; Alan Cooke; William P. D'Angelo; Marc Daniels; Herbert Kenwith; Leslie H. Martinson; Tony Mordente; Howard Morris; Alan Myerson; Bob Sweeney
- Starring: Lorna Patterson; Eileen Brennan; Wendie Jo Sperber; Hal Williams
- Theme music composer: Bob Carroll, Jr. Madelyn Davis
- Opening theme: "Judy's Theme"
- Composers: Barry De Vorzon; Dennis McCarthy; George Tipton
- Country of origin: United States
- Original language: English
- No. of seasons: 3
- No. of episodes: 39 (list of episodes)

Production
- Executive producers: Nick Arnold; Bob Carroll, Jr. Madelyn Davis; Leonard B. Kaufman; Don Reo
- Producers: Judith D. Allison; Hank Bradford; Bob Illes; Arnold Kane; Linda Morris; Vic Rauseo; Elliot Schick; James R. Stein
- Running time: 22–24 minutes
- Production company: Warner Bros. Television

Original release
- Network: CBS
- Release: April 6, 1981 – January 10, 1983

Related
- Private Benjamin

Private Benjamin is an American sitcom television series based on and set during the events of the 1980 movie of the same name that aired on CBS from April 6, 1981, to January 10, 1983. Eileen Brennan, who reprised her role from the film, won an Primetime Emmy Award and Golden Globe Award for her work on the series.

== Synopsis ==
Like the movie, the series is about a spoiled young socialite named Judy Benjamin adjusting to life in the army. She's popular among her fellow enlisted personnel (with the exception of Pvt. Carol Winter), but not with her superiors. Most of the humor in the series is derived from Benjamin and her friends' attempts to evade the watchful eye of their captain.

Although some of the actors from the film play the same characters on the TV show (notably Eileen Brennan and Hal Williams, in their roles of Captain Doreen Lewis and Sgt. L.C. Ross respectively), the title role is acted by Lorna Patterson instead of Goldie Hawn.

While the series was initially shot on film and featured many outdoor scenes, later episodes were more like a standard sitcom, shot on video on soundstages and complete with a laugh track.

In the fall of 1982, Robert Mandan joined the cast as Colonel Lawrence Fielding, the pompous, well-meaning, but ineffectual, head of the camp. In late 1982, Eileen Brennan was struck by a car and Polly Holliday was brought in as Captain Amanda Allen, intended as a temporary replacement for Brennan's Captain Lewis character, but the show was cancelled shortly thereafter.

== Cast and characters ==
- Lorna Patterson as Pvt. Judith "Judy" Benjamin
- Eileen Brennan as Cpt. Doreen Lewis
- Joyce Little as Pvt. Rayleen White
- Robert Mandan as Col. Lawrence Fielding
- Ann Ryerson as Pvt. Carol Winter
- Wendie Jo Sperber as Pvt. Stacy Kouchalakas
- Lucy Webb as Pvt. Luanne Hubble
- Hal Williams as Sgt. Ted Ross
- Lisa Raggio as Pvt. Maria Gianelli
- Damita Jo Freeman as Pvt. Jackie Sims
- Polly Holliday as Cpt. Amanda Allen

== Episodes ==
Season	Episodes	Originally released		Rating
Season	Episodes	First released	Last released	Rating
1	4	April 6, 1981	April 27, 1981	—N/a
2	22	October 12, 1981	April 26, 1982	37
3	13	September 27, 1982	January 10, 1983	45

== Awards and nominations ==
Year	Award	Category	Nominee	Result	Ref.
1982	Golden Globe Awards	Best Television Series – Musical or Comedy		Nominated	
1982	Golden Globe Awards	Best Actress in a Television Series – Musical or Comedy	Eileen Brennan	Won	
1983	Golden Globe Awards	Best Actress in a Television Series – Musical or Comedy	Eileen Brennan	Nominated	
1982	People's Choice Awards	Favorite New TV Comedy Program		Won	
1981	Primetime Emmy Awards	Outstanding Supporting Actress in a Comedy or Variety or Music Series	Eileen Brennan	Won	
1982	Primetime Emmy Awards	Outstanding Supporting Actress in a Comedy or Variety or Music Series	Eileen Brennan	Nominated	
1983	Primetime Emmy Awards	Outstanding Supporting Actress in a Comedy or Variety or Music Series	Eileen Brennan	Nominated	
