= Donna Parker =

Protagonist

Donna Parker is the protagonist of an eponymous seven-volume book series for girls that was written by Marcia Levin under the pseudonym Marcia Martin from the 1950s through the 1960s.

First published by Whitman from 1957 through 1964 in thick glossy picture cover editions, the series was revamped with new cover art in the late 1960s and then reprinted with a smaller, non-glossy picture cover. The series was discontinued by the mid-1970s.

But Donna has recently gained a bit of fame in the 21st century. The book Donna Parker, Special Agent is included in an exhibit at the Newseum in Washington, D.C. The Newseum, which displays all manner of news media memorabilia and artifacts, has a current exhibition titled G-Men and Journalists, featuring prominent spy capers and crime stories. Donna's cheerful face and waving hand are front and center along with other books in the display. A photo of the display appeared in the Washington Post Sunday Magazine on April 26, 2009.

== Characters ==
=== Main characters ===
Donna Parker is a 13, 14, and eventually 15-year-old girl living with her family in Summerfield, a small town located two hours from New York City. She is a pretty girl with dark hair and brown eyes.

Donna is an excellent student who excels at English. She regularly receives A's on her report card, serves on class committees, and in Special Agent joins the editorial team of the Summerfield Junior High newspaper, which is called “Sum-it-Up.” She is a popular student with both teachers and peers.

Calm, loyal, and understanding, Donna is prone to worry about events outside of her control. She is quick to help people and is usually polite.

She is responsible but often receives lectures from her mother on various topics, such as eating a healthy breakfast or being more compassionate to others.

Donna also regularly lectures her younger brother on his speech, grammar, and behavior.

Fredricka (Ricky) West is Donna's best friend. Ricky and Donna are quite different but have a close bond. Red-haired and freckled, Ricky is dreamy, romantic, and melodramatic. She is also a good student and has a passion for acting and drama.

Though Ricky and Donna are close, as they grow up, they begin to go their separate ways more often, especially when they clash about how they like to spend their free time in Special Agent and Takes a Giant Step.

Grace Parker is Donna's mother. She was a schoolteacher and is now a full-time homemaker. She is social, patient, and caring. She tends to lecture Donna but also is a good shoulder for Donna to cry on.

She is an excellent cook who enjoys playing cards, reading, and socializing with friends and through her discussion groups. She is a wonderful seamstress and regularly sews Donna beautiful clothes and dresses.

Sam Parker is Donna's father. He is a salesman and has an excellent sense of humor. He likes to tease Donna, especially about boys. He is always very proud of Donna and her achievements.

James (Jimmy) Parker is Donna's younger brother. He is outgoing, playful, and active. He is good at sports and loves baseball, basketball, and football, and he plays noisy "war" games that annoy Donna. He also makes fun of and teases Donna. His best friend is Skipper Gray, who lives next door to the Parkers.

=== Secondary characters ===
Paul (Richard) White is Donna's friend and almost becomes her boyfriend. They go on dates when he is a counselor at Camp Three Pines and she is a junior counselor at the nearby Camp Cherrydale. They also date during A Spring to Remember. Known by his middle name, Richard, until A Spring to Remember, he decides to revert to his first name, Paul. He is handsome, intelligent, and popular. He is a year older than Donna and leaves school for a short period to pursue full-time work, based on his inaccurate belief that his family is struggling financially because his father is briefly unemployed.

Joyce Davenport is a classmate of Donna's. Initially, she is depicted as arrogant, aloof, and cold. However, after an accident causes Joyce to break her leg and be hospitalized for a while, Donna gets to know her better and finds her a sweet, shy, caring girl. Joyce is highly intelligent and very interested in journalism, due to the fact that her father is the editor of the Summerfield newspaper.

Anne Franklin is a friend of Donna's from school. She is tall, blonde-haired, and has a good sense of humor. She loves animals and plays practical jokes.

Tommy Sheridan is another of Donna's classmates. He is smart, and he has a gift for designing helicopters. His father owns a helicopter factory, and Tommy was the target of spies because of his clever designs in Secret Agent.

Roger Norcross is Grace Parker's long-lost brother. He ran away as a teenager, and the Norcross family heard very little of him for years. He appeared in Special Agent, and he later married Donna's teacher, Miss Fischer, returning to his home in Hollywood. In A Spring to Remember, Roger promises Donna a holiday in California if she gets straight A's on her report card. Donna later visits Roger and his new wife, Adele (formerly Miss Fischer) during the book In Hollywood.

Adele Norcross (formerly Miss Fischer) was a teacher of Donna's from Secret Agent. She is young, friendly, assists with the running of the school newspaper, and organizes the trip to New York for the newspaper staff. Roger Norcross and Adele fall in love and make plans to get married in Secret Agent.

The Stackhouse Family are family friends of the Parkers. They are first introduced in Takes a Giant Step, when the Parker family vacations in Canada. The Stackhouses later move to Summerfield and their son, Jeff, temporarily lives with the Parker family, in order to attend school at the start of the term while his parents arrange their move.

Mr. and Mrs. West are Ricky's parents. Mr. West is formal and old-fashioned. Mrs. West is sweet natured, and she suffered from rheumatic fever in the past. She later passes away during Donna and Ricky's sophomore year in school.

Mr Greer is the principal of Summerfield Junior High.

Marjorie Dengrove is a young teacher from a wealthy family. Sam and Grace Parker arrange for her to stay at the Parker residence when they travel to Europe and India.

George Hart is a classmate of Donna's. He is elected school "Mayor" in Secret Agent. He is considered very handsome, smart, and popular by his classmates.

Amy Alexander is a friend of Donna's from Camp Arawak. Amy is very smart and shy. She does not make friends easily and gets very nervous around boys. She has red hair and freckles, and at first Donna mistakes her for Ricky.

Thornton "Teddy" Bair is a boy who is a counselor at Caribe, a camp for boys located near Arawak. He is charming and handsome, but he's also a gossip with little sense of responsibility.

Jennifer Bruestle lives next door to Mr. and Mrs. Norcross in Hollywood. She and Donna are the same age, and the two become friends. Jennifer desperately wants to be an artist and feels that her parents are not very supportive. Jennifer has a younger brother who is Jimmy's age.

Linda Atkinson is a wealthy girl from Hollywood who is the same age as Donna. Adele Norcross arranges for Linda and Donna to get acquainted during Donna's vacation in California, where Donna visits her Uncle Roger. Linda invites Donna to her mansion and an elaborate party. Donna and Linda are friendly but do not have much in common.

Bruce Maslin is a dashing boy Donna meets on her way to visit her uncle and aunt in Hollywood. He is charming, amusing, and good-looking. However, his lack of responsibility gets Donna into trouble on a few occasions during In Hollywood.

Mike Langley is a studious friend of Linda Atkinson. He is introduced during Donna's visit to California during "In Hollywood". He is very intelligent and hard-working. Donna enjoys his company, finding him reliable and interesting, if not particularly fun.

Ellie Townshead is Bunny Knight's cousin. She is a bridesmaid with Donna in A Spring to Remember. Donna and Ellie do not get along particularly well, especially after Donna overhears Ellie making fun of her with one of the groomsmen. However, during In Hollywood, Donna and Ellie get along better and make arrangements to catch up in California. Ellie is an aspiring ballerina, who is very pretty and delicate.

== Titles in the Series ==
1: Donna Parker at Cherrydale (1957)

Donna and Ricky take jobs as junior counselors at Camp Cherrydale, a summer camp for young children run by Dr. and Mrs. Duvall.

As junior counselors, Donna and Ricky immerse themselves in camp life, enjoying meeting new people, getting to know their young charges, running activities, and soaking up the camp surroundings.

However, camp life quickly becomes complicated. Donna's senior counselor, Bunny, is acting very strangely; Dr. and Mrs. Duvall appear to be hiding something; Nancy, a young girl from Summerfield, is causing problems at the camp; and a mysterious house in the nearby woods intrigues Donna and Ricky.

2: Donna Parker Special Agent (1957)

The summer before Donna's ninth-grade year is over, and Donna and Ricky return to Summerfield Junior High.

The two girls go their separate ways more frequently when Ricky pursues her dramatic talents, but Donna joins the school newspaper instead, where she is elected assistant editor. Although the newspaper staff urges Donna to accept their nomination for editor, she declines, knowing that Joyce is the best person for the position.

Donna's year becomes mysterious when her long-lost uncle appears in Summerfield; her friend, Tommy Sheridan, thinks he is being spied on; Donna's friends start to ignore her; and a strange character, Mr. Brown, is employed as a janitor at Summerfield Junior High.

When the newspaper staff makes an exciting trip to New York City for a journalism convention, Donna us reunited will reunite an old friend and solves the mysteries involving Mr. Brown and Tommy.

3: Donna Parker On Her Own (1957)

Donna's parents are offered the trip of a lifetime—Europe and India—the only catch is that Donna and Jimmy cannot travel with them.

A number of options are examined, but Donna's parents finally decide that a young teacher from Jimmy's school will stay at the Parker home to look after Donna and Jimmy until their parents return.

With fewer rules to worry about, Donna initially enjoys her new independence, but she later learns that it comes with some big responsibilities and worries.

4: Donna Parker: A Spring to Remember (1960)

It's springtime in Summerfield, and Donna is enjoying her last semester of ninth grade at Summerfield Junior High.

After having several dates with former class President, Richard White; receiving an invitation to be a bridesmaid in New York; being offered a trip to Hollywood to visit her uncle Roger; and striving to do well on final exams, Donna feels her year promises to be wonderful, but one tragic event changes both Donna and Ricky's lives permanently.

5: Donna Parker In Hollywood (1961)

Donna is off to Hollywood, where she plans to visit her aunt and uncle in glamorous and expects her time in California to be the trip of a lifetime.

Donna has an exciting plane trip, meets dashing boys, is exposed to the movie industry, attends parties, and meets a mysterious neighbor when Donna spends time with her relatives and tours California.

During her vacation, Donna learns some important lessons, particularly the importance of looking beneath the surface and rejecting superficiality.

6: Donna Parker: Mystery at Arawak (1962)

After her exciting trip to California, Donna takes a job as a junior counselor at Camp Arawak for the remainder of her summer.

At first, Donna finds camp life hard - Arawak is very different from Cherrydale, she does not know anyone, her charges are diverse and lively, and a senior counselor appears to be hiding something.

However, Donna is soon accustomed to camp life, meeting new friends, taking on new tasks, and helping run the Drama department at camp.

While Camp Arawak is quite different from Cherrydale, Donna still finds plenty of mysteries there, and she quickly gets caught up in some strange events.

7: Donna Parker Takes a Giant Step (1964).

Donna's family and Ricky spend the last week of summer vacation traveling to Canada for a few days, to catch up with her parents’ old friends, the Stackhouses. Everyone is excited when the Stackhouses announce that they will be soon be moving to the Summerfield area; and their son, Jeff, returns to live with the Parkers for several weeks, so that her can begin school at beginning of the year.

Donna's life soon becomes complicated when she tries to get acquainted with her new school, try out for the cheerleading squad, deal with a friend moving away, and make new friends. Some teenage parties, called “open houses” threaten to get out of control, but Donna and Jeff work hard to provide an alternative place for young people to spend their time.
