= Bob LaHendro =

American television director

- Born: Robert LaHendro; February 9, 1935 (age 90); Chicago, Illinois, U.S.
- Occupation: Television director
- Years active: 1966–1992

Robert LaHendro (born February 9, 1935) is an American television director.

Born in Chicago, Illinois, LaHendro began his career in 1966, when he worked as a stage manager on the variety television series The Red Skelton Show. He then worked as an associate director for The Smothers Brothers Comedy Hour from 1968 to 1969. LaHendro made his directorial debut on the sitcom television series Sanford and Son, where he directed for two episodes. His directing credits include All in the Family, Flo, Hot l Baltimore, Good Times, That's My Mama, Santa Barbara, Archie Bunker's Place, Fish and Welcome Back, Kotter.

In 1973, LaHendro was nominated for a Primetime Emmy Award in the category Outstanding Directing for a Comedy Series for his work on the television program All in the Family, sharing the nomination with John Rich.
