= Bob Boykin =

American musician

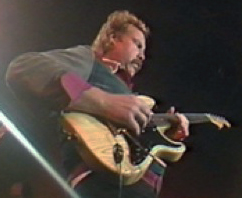
- Bob Boykin on Guitar

Background information
- Birth name: Robert Boykin
- Born: September 24, 1952; Georgia, U.S.
- Died: February 22, 2020 (aged 67); Sherman Oaks, California, U.S.
- Genres: Rock, Blues, Jazz, Country, R&B
- Occupation(s): Guitarist, composer, producer
- Instrument: Guitar
- Years active: 1969–2020
- Labels: Crossroads Int'l Records
- Website: bobboykin.com

Bob Boykin (September 24, 1942 – February 22, 2020) was an American musician, session musician, composer, and producer, best known as a guitarist.

== Career ==
Bob grew up on a farm outside of Savannah, on a dirt road in south Georgia. He began playing music professionally by age 16 in the local clubs in Savannah. Soon after high school he moved to Nashville, where he started working as a studio guitarist and songwriter, working with many of Nashville's top stars in the studio and on the Grand Ole Opry.

He first came to Los Angeles in the mid 80s for a recording session for his first solo CD with many of LA's top studio musicians. A few years later, he returned to LA. It wasn't long before he played on his first television show as a side man, for Marvel Comics Saturday morning cartoon shows and the hit TV series MacGyver. It was during that time he teamed up with Grammy winning Saxophonist Ernie Watts, and produced many collaborative original works, including the Billboard Top Ten song "Language of the Heart" which appears on the Ernie Watts Quartet album. Soon after that he began composing songs and main titles for Columbia Pictures, Sony, Glen Larson at 20th Century Fox, Warner Brothers and MGM. His original songs and scores have been heard on hit shows such as Sex and the City, West Wing, The X-Files, Chris Isaak Show, Married People, Fame, Route 66, Married... with Children, Sea Hunt, L.A. Firefighters and Moon Over Miami (with members of the "Tonight Show Band") and feature films like Toy Story, Chicken Run, Red Surf, Keys to Tulsa, Sister Sister, Flypaper, AFI, Women in Film- Steven Spielberg, Down the Barrel, and Take the Lead (starring Antonio Banderas) to name a few. Bob was later hired as the weekly composer and music producer of the #1 ABC Weekly prime-time series Married People including composing the main & end titles, produced by Columbia Pictures/Sony.

He has composed for dozens of film and television shows including themes and soundtracks to his recording credit.

His solo CD, Hazardous Material was released in 1997 and featured players from across the music spectrum including Ernie Watts, Abraham Laboriel, Brian Bromberg, Jimmy Earl, Neil Stubenhaus, Jerry Hey, Gary Grant, Bill Reichenbach, Paul Leim, Dave Carpenter, Greg Mathieson, Jimmy Z, Dann Huff, Luis Conte, Joel Taylor, Pat Coil, and others.

A Guitar World magazine review stated Four Stars – Ain't Too Proud to Shred – Firepower is the key word in this jazz/rock workout. Boykin is a ferocious soloist who segues from bop-style jazz phrases to wailing rock licks with the greatest of ease."

Vintage Guitar magazine says....."From '70s-style funk, to blues, to killer ballad work and pretty much any jazz style you can think of, Boykin's playing shines."

Guitar International magazine names him "... a "go to" session player in Los Angeles and Nashville, with an impressive body of music that regularly finds its way into top television programs and commercials as well as major motion pictures."

== Filmography ==
| Year | Film/Television show | Credits | Notes |
|---|---|---|---|
| 1985 | MacGyver | Musician | Episode: "Pilot" |
| 1986 | Tough Guys | Musician | |
| 1987 | Sea Hunt | Composer, Additional Music | |
| 1987 | Sister, Sister | Composer, Additional Music | |
| 1987 | Back to the Beach | Musician | |
| 1988 | Tour of Duty | Composer, Additional Music | Episode: "Under Siege" |
| 1989 | Tennessee Waltz | Composer, Additional Music | |
| 1990 | Married People | Composer, Additional Music | |
| 1990 | Hurricane Sam | Composer, Additional Music | |
| 1993 | Route 66 | Composer, Additional Music | |
| 1994 | Jonathan Stone: Threat of Innocence | Composer, Additional Music | |
| 1996 | Keys to Tulsa | Composer, Additional Music/Musician | |
| 1996 | L.A. Firefighters | Composer, Additional Music | Episode: "Pilot" |
| 1997 | Married... with Children | Composer, Additional Music | Episode: "Chicago Shoe Exchange" |
| 1997 | Oz | Composer, Additional Music | Episode "Plan B" |
| 1998 | Finding Graceland | Composer, Additional Music | |
| 1998 | Sex and the City | Composer, Additional Music | Episodes: "Sex and the City", "Oh Come All Ye Faithful" |
| 1998 | Recoil | Composer | |
| 1999 | Flypaper | Composer, Additional Music | |
| 1999 | Freeway II: Confessions of a Trickbaby | Songwriter/Musician | |
| 2000 | The X-Files | Composer, Additional Music | Episode: "The Amazing Maleeni" |
| 2001 | The Chris Isaak Show | Composer, Additional Music | Episode: "Lost and Found" |
| 2003 | Down the Barrel | Composer, Additional Music | |
| 2006 | Collier & Co | Composer, Additional Music | |
| 2006 | Take the Lead | Musician | |
