= Ray Aranha =

American dramatist

- Born: Raymond Douglass Aranha; May 1, 1939; Miami, Florida, U.S.
- Died: October 9, 2011 (aged 72); Stamford, Connecticut, U.S.
- Other name: Ray Arahna
- Occupations: Actor, playwright, theater director
- Spouse: Jean Aranha
- Children: Marc Aranha, Teri Pauline Aranha Tate, Delaine Aranha
- Website: www.prometheusfire.org

Ray Aranha (May 1, 1939 – October 9, 2011) was an American actor, playwright, and stage director.

== Career ==
Born in Miami, Florida, Aranha appeared in and written numerous stage productions. In 1974, he won a Drama Desk Award for Outstanding New Playwright for My Sister, My Sister. Aranha also wrote and toured in a one-man show, I Am Black, and later appeared as "Jim Bono" in Fences.

In addition to stage work, Aranha appeared in various film and television roles. In 1990, he co-starred in the short-lived ABC series Married People. After the series was canceled in 1991, he appeared in yet another short-lived series The Heights in 1992. Aranha has since had roles in Are You Afraid of the Dark?, New York Undercover, and Law & Order, and has roles in Dead Man Walking (1995), Deconstructing Harry (1997), and Maid in Manhattan (2002).

== Death ==
On October 9, 2011, Aranha died at the age of 72 from a stroke.

== Filmography ==
Year	Title	Role	Notes
1982	A Stranger Is Watching	Cop in Bathroom	
1987	Five Corners	Arthur	
1990 to 1991	Married People	Nick Williams	18 episodes
1991	City of Hope	Errol	
1992	The Heights	Mr. Mike	12 episodes
1994	Drop Squad	Bruford Jamison Sr	
1993	American Playhouse	Reverend Foy	Episode: "Hallelujah"
1994	Lifestories: Families in Crisis	Victor	Episode: "POWER: The Eddie Matos Story"
1994 to 1997	New York Undercover	Jamell Johnson; Mel Dunston	2 episodes
1994 to 1999	Law & Order	Dr. Henry "Papa Doc" Doirnell; Judge	2 episodes
1995	Are You Afraid of the Dark?	Cap Anderson	Episode: "The Tale of Train Magic"
1995	Die Hard with a Vengeance	Janitor	Credited as Ray Arahna
1995	Dead Man Walking	Luis Montoya	
1995 to 1997	As the World Turns	Sparky Wells	2 episodes
1996	City Hall	James Bone	
1996	Box of Moon Light	Soapy	
1996	Twisted	Can Man	
1997	Deconstructing Harry	Professor Aranha	
1997	The Kid	Cappy Dover	
1998	Cosby	James	Episode: "Chemistry"
2000	Third Watch	Barnett Freeman	Episode: "Journey to the Himalayas"
2001	Ed	Harry Lockemather	2 episodes
2001	Good Advice	Man in Central Park	
2002	Maid in Manhattan	Bus driver	
2003	Shortcut to Happiness	Mailman	(final film role)
