= DeForest Covan =

American actor, dancer and vaudeville performer (1917–2007)

- Born: September 9, 1917; Chicago, Illinois, U.S.
- Died: September 8, 2007 (aged 89); Los Angeles, California, U.S.
- Occupations: Actor, dancer, entertainer
- Years active: 1936–1994

DeForest Covan (September 9, 1917 – September 8, 2007) was an American actor, dancer, and vaudeville performer. From 1974 to 1975, he held a co-starring role on the first season of That's My Mama as Josh, the barbershop patron. Aside from acting, he performed stunt work at Metro-Goldwyn-Mayer for ten years.

== Partial filmography ==
- The Singing Kid (1936) - Dancer (uncredited)
- Nancy Steele Is Missing! (1937) - Little Bill (uncredited)
- A Day at the Races (1937) - Black Singer (uncredited)
- Every Day's a Holiday (1937) - Dancer (uncredited)
- Too Hot to Handle (1938) - South American Fire Dancer (uncredited)
- Going Places (1938) - Shoe-Shine (uncredited)
- Boy Slaves (1939) - Pinkie (uncredited)
- St. Louis Blues (1939) - Dancer (uncredited)
- Pride of the Blue Grass (1939) - Blackie (uncredited)
- Chasing Trouble (1940) - Jackson (uncredited)
- New Moon (1940) - Dancer (uncredited)
- South of Suez (1940) - Bita (uncredited)
- Mr. Washington Goes to Town (1941) - Short Man
- Jungle Drums of Africa (1953) - Native Tribesman (uncredited)
- Carmen Jones (1954) - Trainer (uncredited)
- Panther Girl of the Kongo (1955) - Koango (uncredited)
- Pork Chop Hill (1959) - U.S. Soldier (uncredited)
- Black Samson (1974) - Samson's Street People
- The Day of the Locust (1975) - Shoe Shine Boy
- Rocky (1976) - Apollo's Corner #1
- New York, New York (1977) - Porter
- The Incredible Melting Man (1977) - Janitor
- Beneath the Valley of the Ultra-Vixens (1979) - Zebulon
- When a Stranger Calls (1979) - Officer #1
- Cheech and Chong's Next Movie (1980) - Pinochle Player
- Evilspeak (1981) - Janitor
- Body and Soul (1981) - Cut Man
- Honkytonk Man (1982) - Gravedigger
- The Night Before (1988) - Concierge
- To Sleep with Anger (1990) - Fred Jenkins
- One Good Cop (1991) - Older Man
