= Robert Illes =

American screenwriter

Robert Illes (born May 17, 1948 in Downey, California) is an American Emmy-winning screenwriter, television producer, playwright and author.

== Early life ==
Robert Illes was born in Downey, California to immigrant parents. His father Peter Illes (1920–2002) who spent some 40 years in the printing and stationery business in Los Angeles, was a native of Hungary, emigrating to central California in 1931. Mother Pauline Corne (1924- ) is a native of Norwich, England. His parents met and married during World War II in Norwich, where Peter was serving in the U. S. 8th Air Force. They moved to the Southern California area after the war, eventually settling in Los Angeles. Robert has a brother and two sisters.

Illes attended Los Angeles public schools, where he excelled in art and creative writing, graduating George Washington High School before entering the University of Southern California in Los Angeles, studying telecommunications and journalism. He worked briefly for the Daily Trojan as a reporter before becoming a comedy newscaster for KUSC-FM, then a student run radio station.

== The Stein & Illes Radio Show ==
He soon teamed up with another student, James R. Stein to co-host the Saturday night Stein & Illes comedy radio show for three years. They became very popular with the burgeoning FM underground audience. The show was a pre-Howard Stern-style free-for-all, featuring characters voiced by the two, as well as "live" regulars including Robert's brother, musician Rick, providing the show "orchestra" and Steven "Larry J. Felix" Kutcher, an entomologist who gave a weekly USDA "bug report", and was comic foil. Marcia Levine was the show's long suffering and diligent producer. A number of fans of the show remain friends including brothers Dennis and Brian Pollack who also became professional TV comedy writers. Brian went on to win three Emmys as a writer for Cheers. Stein and Illes returned to the radio some 20 years later for a brief renewal of their performing chops.

== Television ==
After several failed attempts to get into professional radio - which at the time was becoming less and less "personality driven", the two by chance took a course in TV writing at USC given by TV producer/writer Digby Wolfe, at the time producing a Tennessee Ernie Ford special for NBC. Wolfe decided to hire two students writers, and Bob and Jim, after writing a Tennessee Ernie Ford spec monologue, were selected. Their performer days ended when their radio show was "canceled" around this time, and they remained behind the scenes writers and producers, with occasional forays in front of the camera, or appearances at KPFK fundraisers.

As a result of that experience, they met William Morris agent Michael Ovitz, who was himself a fan of the Stein and Illes radio show. Although barely older than the two writers, Ovitz took them under his wing. In 1971, they worked with co-writers Bob Einstein ("Super Dave") and Steve Martin on a short lived syndicated series, Tom Smothers' Organic Primetime Space Ride. In 1972, they were hired as writers on The New Bill Cosby variety show for CBS, where they settled into writing Bill Cosby monologues.

Thereafter, Robert and James wrote for a Lily Tomlin Special, which along with the writing staff that included Lorne Michaels and Herb Sergeant, earned them their first of two Emmy awards (and four nominations). They worked on a number of series and specials including John Denver, Sonny Bono, and a short-lived new Smothers Brothers series on NBC.

During this time, they wrote three episodes for the classic series Sanford and Son. Producer Aaron Ruben called Bob at the behest of William Morris because he was a fan of KUSC – not of their old college radio show, but of the classical music! Nevertheless, Bob and Jim, who had never written a situation comedy episode before, ventured in to see the great Ruben and sold him on a story right off the bat. They wrote a total of three episodes for the series, and in doing so created the character of Aunt Esther's husband, Woody.

They went on to create a CBS television series for Richard "Clemenza" Costellano in 1975 titled Joe and Sons which lasted for a half a season in 1975-76. Also in the show were future Tony award winner Barry Miller and Jerry Stiller.

After Joe and Sons went off the air, Bob and Jim travelled as TV writers took them to programs as varied as The Love Boat, Steve Allen's Laughback, Steve Allen's 3rd Annual Miss Las Vegas Show Girl Pageant, Phyllis Diller's 102nd Birthday Party, (Dick) Van Dyke and Company (reunited with Bob Einstein and Steve Martin, and for which they received their second Emmy nomination), One Day at a Time, the classic Fernwood 2Night, starring Martin Mull and Fred Willard, renamed America 2Night (for which they received an Emmy nomination for Best Writing), What's Happening!!, The Captain and Tennille Show (where they were often on camera as comedy performers), and The Carol Burnett Show.

The Carol Burnett Show, which in its 11th season featured guest stars Rock Hudson, The Jackson Five, James Stewart, Steve Martin, Bernadette Peters, and Betty White, among others, earned Robert and James their second writing Emmy.

After Carol pulled the plug on her own show, Bob and Jim went on to write for the Mary Tyler Moore "sit-var" which starred among others David Letterman and Michael Keaton, Dick Clark's Live Wednesday, Dick Clark's Good Ol' Days, A New Kind of Family starring Eileen Brennan with a teenaged Rob Lowe and a 9 year old Janet Jackson, Flo – a spin-off of Alice starring Polly Holiday, Private Benjamin and a five-year run producing and executive producing Silver Spoons starring Ricky Schroder on NBC.

Silver Spoons also featured young Jason Bateman as Ricky's rival Derek, and John Houseman as Grandfather Stratton. Gary Coleman and Pearl Bailey also made a memorable guest appearance. Bob and Jim brought over Frank "Happy Kyne" deVol of Fernwood 2Night fame to guest star in a special episode.

After Silver Spoons, Illes and Stein went on to write and produce The Motown Revue starring Smokey Robinson which was a summer series featuring guests as Stevie Wonder, the Four Tops, Diana Ross, Mary Wells, Martha Reeves, Boy George, Dean Martin, Linda Ronstadt, Rick Nelson and many others. In the cast of regular performers were Damita Jo Freeman, Arsenio Hall and Khandi Alexander.

Illes and Stein continued to write and produce pilots into the late 80's, including a Jim Nabors project called Sylvan in Paradise, and an animated pilot starring the voices of Stan Freberg, Rose Marie, Pat Paulsen, Jayne Meadows and Harry Shearer, The Jackie Bison Show.

Another short lived series upon which they were creative consultants was a CBS project for Monty Python's Eric Idle, Nearly Departed, and executive produced Amen starring Sherman Hemsley.

Illes and Stein returned briefly to radio on Los Angeles' KIEV (now KRLA) for six months in 1992, with frequent guest appearances by Pat McCormick and Bob "Super Dave" Einstein.

In the mid 1990s, after working together on the talk show parody Night Stand, Illes and Stein went their separate ways, having worked together for over 25 years.

== Solo career ==
Illes left the team to write and produce the long running Sister, Sister at Paramount Pictures TV and co-created the UPN series Goode Behavior, starring Sherman Hemsley and Dorien Wilson, and was consulting producer for City Guys, a popular Saturday morning teen sit com from the creators of Saved by the Bell. He also wrote multiple episodes for Family Matters.

In 2000, Illes traveled to Florida to produce another pilot for Sherman Hemsley, and later wrote for the Discovery Channel series "Guilty or Innocent?".

Illes finally entered the world of "reality" with the special for TVLand network titled "Living in TV Land starring Sherman Hemsley", and an Office-style reality show called "Caffe Etc." for the Internet.

== Personal life ==
Robert Illes married Mary Ann Herrera in 1970. She was a fan of his radio show, and they met when she visited the studio with her cousins. They had two daughters, Angela and Brooke, and one son, Nathan. Brooke earned a master's degree in speech; Nathan is a songwriter and much sought after drummer in a number of Los Angeles bands and an ex-champion softball centerfielder and leadoff batter and Angela is a pastry chef. They have all appeared in Robert's television productions over the years. They have also produced four grandchildren.

Robert and Mary Ann divorced in 1982, after which he married actress Barbara Pariot, the voice of Valerie on Josie and the Pussycats and for many years a story editor at Warner Bros. They have one son, Nicholas, an artist.

Illes still resides in Los Angeles, continuing to write scripts and consult with cohorts on projects, as well as mentoring newcomers. He has been a member of a number of panels on the TV writing business at UCLA and the Writers Guild of America.

In extracurricular activities, Robert Illes has been a guest judge at The World Championships of Performing Arts since 2007, and has for many years been an online mentor for the Writers Guild of America West. He has written extensively for progressive publications, most notably the Valley Democrats United newsletter and the website LA Progressive, and contributed pieces for several magazines on the writing business.

Robert has been developing a television writing course and is writing a book on TV writing and his experiences in the television industry. He hosted an internet radio show, Funny is Money, on Shokus Radio nightly at 8 PM Pacific time from 2006 to 2012.
