= Elsa Raven =

American actress (1929–2020)

- Born: Elsa Rabinowitz; September 21, 1929; Charleston, South Carolina, U.S.
- Died: November 2, 2020 (aged 91); Los Angeles, California, U.S.
- Occupation: Actress
- Years active: 1961–2011

Elsa Rabinowitz (September 21, 1929 – November 2, 2020), known professionally as Elsa Raven, was an American character actress, perhaps best known for her two years (1988–1990) on the sitcom Amen and playing the mother of Vincent Terranova (Ken Wahl) on the TV series Wiseguy.

Raven is also known for her small but memorable role in Back to the Future (1985) as the clock tower lady with her phrase "Save the clock tower!" while gathering local donations to preserve the clock, whose complimentary leaflet later proves invaluable in the past. She played Ida Straus in the 1997 film Titanic along with Lew Palter, who played Isidor Straus, and had a voice role in the 1981 animated film American Pop.

Raven adhered to Judaism. Raven died on November 2, 2020, in Los Angeles, at the age of 91. Upon her death, she was cremated and her ashes returned to her family.

== Filmography ==
=== Film appearances ===
Year	Title	Role	Notes
1970	The Honeymoon Killers	Matron	
1971	Such Good Friends	Transfusion donor nurse	Uncredited
1971	The Gang That Couldn't Shoot Straight	Mrs. Water Buffalo	
1971	Lady Liberty	Policewoman	Uncredited
1971	South of Hell Mountain		
1972	A Fan's Notes	Deborah	
1979	The Cracker Factory	Tourist	
1979	The Amityville Horror	Mrs. Townsend	
1980	Fatso	Phil's Wife	
1981	American Pop	Hannele	Voice
1981	The Postman Always Rings Twice	Matron	
1981	Paternity	Pre-natal Nurse	
1983	Second Thoughts	Large Nurse	
1983	Twilight Zone: The Movie	Nurse No. 2	Segment "Kick the Can"
1985	Back to the Future	Clocktower Lady	
1985	Creator	Mrs. Mallory	
1988	The Moderns	Gertrude Stein	
1991	Another You	Volunteer	
1993	Indecent Proposal	Citizenship Student	
1993	In the Line of Fire	Booth's Landlady	
1993	Fearless	Grey Haired Lady	
1995	One Night Stand	Mrs. Salvatore	
1997	Titanic	Ida Straus	
2001	Face to Face	Grandma	
2002	The 4th Tenor	Mama	
2005	The Mostly Unfabulous Social Life of Ethan Green	Senior Lady	
2005	The Cutter	Mrs. Rosen	
2005	Laying Down Arms	Ester	Short movie
2006	Miriam	Aunt Levya	
2009	Dead Game	Boogie	Short movie
2011	They're with Me	Great Great Grandma Fanny Feiner	Short movie
2011	Answers to Nothing	Mrs. Harrison	

=== TV appearances ===
Year	Title	Role	Notes
1982	Million Dollar Infield	Dr. Isabel Armen	
1978-1982	Quincy, M.E.	Miss Beck, Miss Coroner Judge, Nurse Angela Davenport	
1983-1984	The A-Team	Clara Dickerson, Dr. Marian Ericson	
1985	Highway to Heaven	Ms. Zabenko	
1986	Family Ties	Mildred Atkins	
1986	General Hospital	Tessie	
1988	Freddy's Nightmares	Mrs. Wildmon	
1989-1990	Amen	Inga	
1987-1990	Wiseguy	Carlotta Terranova Aiuppo	
1991	Get a Life	Marta	
1992	The Fresh Prince of Bel-Air	Ida Pollock	
1993	Murphy Brown	Mrs. Kobolakis	
1993	Sisters	Madam Sophie	
1994	Seinfeld	Mom	
1999	3rd Rock from the Sun	Aunt Florence	
2004	Everybody Loves Raymond	Mrs. Lopman	
2008	ER	Rosemary Smalls	
