= That's My Mama =

American television sitcom (1974–75)

- Created by: Dan T. Bradley; Allan L. Rice
- Developed by: Stanley Ralph Ross
- Starring: Clifton Davis; Theresa Merritt; Theodore Wilson; Lynne Moody; Jester Hairston; DeForest Covan; Ted Lange; Lisle Wilson; Joan Pringle; Helen Martin
- Theme music composer: Allan Blye; Chris Bearde; Gene Farmer (1974–1975); Lamont Dozier (1975)
- Composers: Jack Eskew (1974–1975); Lamont Dozier (1975)
- Country of origin: United States
- No. of seasons: 2
- No. of episodes: 39

Production
- Executive producers: Allan Blye; Chris Bearde (1974–1975); David Pollock; Elias Davis (1975)
- Producers: Walter N. Bien; Gene Farmer
- Running time: 25 minutes (per episode)
- Production companies: Blye-Bearde Productions (1974–1975); Pollock/Davis, Inc. (1975); Columbia Pictures Television

Original release
- Network: ABC
- Release: September 4, 1974 – December 17, 1975

That's My Mama is an American television sitcom that was the first series to be produced by Columbia Pictures Television and originally broadcast for 39 episodes on ABC from September 4, 1974, to December 17, 1975. That's My Mama was never a ratings success, having always been beaten by NBC's Little House on the Prairie among other competing programs, and was not among the 30 most-watched U.S. programs in the Nielsen ratings for either the 1974–1975 or 1975–1976 television seasons. As a result, the series ended on December 17, 1975.

== Synopsis ==
Set in a middle-class African-American neighborhood in Washington, D.C., the program revolved around the character Clifton Curtis (played by Clifton Davis), a man in his mid-20s who worked as a barber at Oscar's Barber Shop, the family barber shop he had inherited from his late father. While Clifton enjoyed being a bachelor, his loving, but tart-tongued and opinionated mother Eloise "Mama" Curtis, played by Theresa Merritt, wanted him to settle down and find a nice wife. Additional characters – such as Clifton's two best friends—Earl, played by Teddy Wilson, an easy-going mailman and Junior, played by Ted Lange, a suave and good-humored ladies' man—came and went over the course of a typical day at Oscar's Barber Shop. Other characters included Tracy, Clifton's little sister, played by Lynne Moody and later by Joan Pringle and her husband, Leonard, played by Lisle Wilson, as well as local seniors Josh and Wildcat, played by DeForest Covan and Jester Hairston. Clifton Davis and Hairston would work together again years later in the hit sitcom, Amen.

The original title for That's My Mama was The Furst Family of Washington. One year before the series debuted, ABC aired the pilot episode of this version, starring Merritt opposite Godfrey Cambridge as her son Oscar, as a one-off special.

=== That's My Mama Now! ===
In 1986, inspired by the success of What's Happening Now!!, Columbia Pictures Television produced a pilot for a sequel series called That's My Mama Now! with Ted Lange as the star. It lacked enough stations signing up to ensure revival.

== Cast ==
- Clifton Davis as Clifton Curtis
- Theresa Merritt as Eloise "Mama" Curtis, the widowed mother of Clifton and Tracy, Oscar's widow
- Ted Lange as Junior, childhood best friend of Clifton and Earl, who attends college later in the series
- Theodore Wilson as Earl Chambers, Clifton's best friend and army buddy who works for the United States Postal Service, and later a fellow barber alongside Clifton in Oscar's Barber Shop
  - Ed Bernard originally portrayed Earl in the episodes "Whose Child Is This?" (pilot) and "Honesty Day" (season 1). Wilson portrayed a character named "Teddy" in the pilot and took over the role of Earl in the third episode thereafter.
- Lynne Moody (season 1) and Joan Pringle (season 2) as Tracy Curtis Taylor, Clifton's younger sister, who is a graduate student
- Lisle Wilson as Leonard Taylor, Tracy's husband, who is an accountant
  - Ilunga Adell portrayed Leonard in "Honesty Day" (season 1, episode 2)
- Jester Hairston as Wildcat (season 1, main)
- DeForest Covan as Josh (season 1, main)
- Helen Martin as Laura (season 2, recurring)
  - Ernestine Wade portrayed Laura in "The Birthday Party" (season 2, episode 1). Wade portrayed a different character in "Clifton's Sugar Mama" (season 1)

== Episodes ==
=== Season 1 (1974–1975) ===
No. overall	No. in season	Title	Directed by	Written by	Original release date
1	1	"Whose Child Is This?"	Bob LaHendro	Larry Siegel	September 4, 1974
Clifton's past catches up with him, when a woman from his past shows up at the barbershop with a baby and claiming it's his. When he refuses to marry her, she gets an "attorney". Mama feels something fishy.
2	2	"Honesty Day"	Bob LaHendro	Tom Tenowich & Ed Scharlach	September 11, 1974
Clifton calls for an Honesty Day during which no one in the family can tell a lie for 24 hours. In the beginning it's refreshing, but things get ugly when the honesty gets brutal.
3	3	"Clifton's Dubious Romance"	Bob LaHendro	Larry Siegel	September 18, 1974
Finally, Mama's matchmaking ways to "hook-up" Clifton work. She sets him up with a very beautiful girl named Polly. All is good until Earl confesses to Tracy that he "knows" Polly from back in the day and she had a "rep" as a man-eater.
4	4	"Cousin Albert"	Bob LaHendro	Hal Goldman & Al Gordon	September 25, 1974
Mama wishes Clifton was more of a success like his cousin Albert, who appears to be dealing a well-to-do insurance franchise. But Junior finds out that insurance is not what cousin Albert is "dealing".
5	5	"Clifton's Sugar Mama"	Bob LaHendro	Ron Friedman	October 2, 1974
A rich, old friend of Mama's comes to town. Clifton used to call her "Auntie" Melvina when he was 3 years old. But Clifton is a grown man now and "Auntie" Melvina is a sexy 'cougar' looking to have some fun with him while in town.
6	6	"Clifton's Big Move"	Bob LaHendro	Larry Siegel	October 9, 1974
Freddie Hamptom, an old Army buddy of Clifton, shows up in town wanting Clifton to be his new roommate. Clifton jumps at the chance despite Mama's objection. The swinging life is not all he thought it would be and wants to move back home.
7	7	"Mama Steps Out"	Bob LaHendro	Larry Siegel	October 16, 1974
Clifton finds out the real reason Mama is acting all secretive and staying out late at night, it's because she has a boyfriend. But Clifton discovers that Mama's beau does not want a wife, he wants a maid for his 6 kids.
8	8	"The Loan"	Bob LaHendro	Bob Shayne	October 23, 1974
When Clifton tries to collect a $50 debt from his brother-in-law Leonard, everything becomes chaotic because Leonard does not have any recollection of the loan! Mama tries to believe in them both and help, but it makes matters worse.
9	9	"Clifton's Con"	Bob LaHendro	Thad Mumford & Dan Wilcox	October 30, 1974
An army friend from the past, Floyd, shows up at the barbershop to collect a debt. Turns out he helped Clifton back in the day and now needs the favor returned - he needs a job. All's good until it's discovered Floyd was an ex-con.
10	10	"Clifton's Persuasion"	Bob LaHendro	Larry Siegel	November 6, 1974
Clifton's faith is in doubt, and he gives up on church. Is it a run of bad luck, or Mama's browbeating that will finally make a believer out of him?
11	11	"Oscar's Affair"	Bob LaHendro	Story by : Jerry Ross; Teleplay by : Jerry Ross & Larry Siegel	November 13, 1974
Mama wants to know why Clifton is acting strange since one of Mama's rivals has been back in town. Turns out that that this rival confessed to Clifton that she had an affair with his father, after he was married to Mama.
12	12	"Tracy's Trouble"	Bob LaHendro	Hal Goldman & Al Gordon	November 20, 1974
Tracy has a fight with Leonard and moves back to her mother's home. She refuses to say what the fight was about but that doesn't stop Mama and Cliff from trying to fix the problem.
13	13	"The Gun"	Bob LaHendro	Jay Moriarity & Mike Milligan	December 4, 1974
Earl is beaten during a burglary, which leads to him wanting to purchase a firearm. Clifton agrees and obtains one for him, but Earl insists Clifton keeps it. Mama disagrees strenuously.
14	14	"Song and Dance Man"	Bob LaHendro	Ron Friedman	December 11, 1974
Clifton is in for the surprise of his life when he starts to date a vaudeville performer of a family friend.
15	15	"Mama Gets Fractured"	Bob LaHendro	Larry Siegel	December 25, 1974
Mama breaks her leg, so Clifton gets one of the sisters from the church to move in to take over the household duties. The sister doesn't want to do things the way Mama wants, instead wants to do things her way. Mama doesn't back down and the sister tells Mama that as long as she is staying in the house, things are going to be done her way.
16	16	"The Last Haircut"	Bob LaHendro	Story by : David Evans and Sally Evans; Teleplay by : Larry Siegel	January 8, 1975
Clifton's license renewal for the barbershop is due, and Mama is determined that everything is cleaned and perfect. Cliff is unconcerned until an elderly customer dies during a haircut. Earl helps to hide the body during the inspection.
17	17	"The Shakedown"	Stan Lathan	Rick Mittleman	January 15, 1975
Earl gets Clifton to co-sign for a loan to get his car fixed. The loan company has some shady lending practices.
18	18	"The Ambulance Chaser"	Stan Lathan	Simon Muntner	January 22, 1975
Clifton walks across the street to the cleaners and gets hit by a taxi. Earl insists on getting a lawyer involved.
19	19	"Earl's Girl"	Bob LaHendro	Jerry Ross	January 29, 1975
Earl thinks he has found his match in a beautiful woman. Unfortunately, Clifton finds out that the woman doesn't share the same feelings for Earl.
20	20	"The Witness"	Bob LaHendro	Hal Goldman & Al Gordon	February 5, 1975
When the neighborhood deli is robbed by Croaker the only person who can ID him is Earl. But he's afraid of retribution if he goes to the police but can't handle the guilt of being afraid.
21	21	"Clifton and the Kid"	Alan Rafkin	Story by : Jay Moriarty & Mike Milligan; Teleplay by : Jay Moriarty & Mike Milligan and Larry Siegel	February 12, 1975
Clifton is dating a woman with a young son who becomes very attached to him. When the relationship ends, her son just can't say goodbye to Clifton.
22	22	"The Hero"	Norman Abbott	Erik Tarloff	February 19, 1975
Hank, Clifton's cousin, returns to Washington D.C. to attend his dad's funeral. Hank had to run out of town years before because he testified against a bad guy named Doc. Doc gets word that Hank is back in town. He comes to Clifton's barbershop, stating that he is out for revenge. Doc also hints that anyone found protecting Hank will be in trouble, too.
23	23	"The Image Maker"	Stan Lathan	Ron Friedman	February 26, 1975
Clifton has the opportunity to audition for a television show about the up-and-coming black middle class. The rest of the neighborhood decides they want in on the action.
24	24	"Trial and Error"	Norman Abbott	Rick Mittleman	March 5, 1975
Leonard wins big at the neighborhood poker game but gets arrested on his way home while visiting a house of ill-repute.
25	25	"Clifton and Politics"	Bob LaHendro	Ilunga Adell	March 12, 1975
Clifton hosts a fundraiser for a friend running for city council.
26	26	"Stephanie's Boyfriend"	Bob LaHendro	Ron Friedman	March 26, 1975
Stephanie, an old girlfriend of Clifton's, returns to town but her current boyfriend refuses to let Clifton be.

=== Season 2 (1975) ===
No. overall	No. in season	Title	Directed by	Written by	Original release date
27	1	"The Birthday Party"	Arnold Margolin	Lloyd Garver	September 10, 1975
Leonard's birthday gift to his mother-in-law Mama of a burial plot brings her celebration to a halt. Clifton is particularly upset with his brother-in-law's gesture because he must think of a future without his parent.
28	2	"Business Is Business"	Noam Pitlik	Walter Bien & Gene Farmer	September 17, 1975
Clifton is offered a partnership in a business deal to create a chain of high end barber shops.
29	3	"Mama's Solution"	Herbert Kenwith	Charlie Hauck	September 24, 1975
Leonard, known for being high strung, is persuaded into hiring Mama at his accounting firm.
30	4	"That's Earl, Brother"	Arnold Margolin	Milton R.F. Brown	October 1, 1975
Clifton leaves Earl in charge of the barbershop, hoping he doesn't regret it. Earl is soon enticed by an attractive young woman who sees an opportunity to rob the establishment.
31	5	"A Date with Judy"	Burt Brinckerhoff	Larry Siegel	October 8, 1975
Clifton is talked into going on a date with Judy who turns out to be an average looking girl. Clifton has good time and wants to continue seeing her but worries what his friends will think because she's not a stunning beauty.
32	6	"Earl's Dad and Mama's Glad"	Arnold Margolin	Lloyd Garver	October 15, 1975
Cliff and Earl think it's a good idea if Earl's father Sammy meets Cliff's Mama. They are thinking romance, but Sammy has his eye on Mama's bank account for one of his business ventures.
33	7	"Weekend Daddy"	Arnold Margolin	Bud Wiser	October 22, 1975
Leonard decides to become a "Weekend Father" an organization similar to Big Brother, and he gets a young boy named Andy. Andy, however, latches onto Earl, despite Leonard's attempts to bond with the boy. After a further attempt to bond with Andy, Leonard loses him at a ball game after giving him money to get snacks. Andy apparently has run away and, despite reassurances from Mama, Leonard is worried that only the worst could have happened. Soon, Andy shows up at the Curtis house and reveals that his running away was a test to find out if Leonard really did like him and want to be his "weekend daddy". Leonard, in a turn of events, stands up to Andy and shows him what a real father should do--punish him, but sternly and fairly and tell Andy he still loves him. After Leonard, Tracy, and Andy make up and go home, Earl drops by, and Mama discovers that he is the one who convinced Andy to come back when he realized Andy needed a "father" and not just a "friend".
34	8	"Clifton and La Femme"	Arnold Margolin	David Pollock & Elias Davis	October 29, 1975
Clifton has eyes for a French speaking woman that he met at an art exhibit, only to later realize that she is Junior's new girlfriend.
35	9	"Mama's Big Move"	Arnold Margolin	Bud Wiser	November 5, 1975
After Mama's friend, suggests that her son needs to grow up and be a man, Mama moves out of the house in order to give Clifton the privacy she feels is important to his maturation.
36	10	"Queen of the Ribs"	Mort Lachman	Jim Parker	November 12, 1975
Earl pretends to be the owner of the barbershop in order to impress his new girlfriend. And once Earl starts lying, will he be able to hear the truth? That she doesn't care?
37	11	"A Man from the Past"	Burt Brinckerhoff	Charlie Hauck	November 19, 1975
An old family friend (and one-time flame of Mama's) breezes into town a changed man. He's a minister. Putting two and two together, Clifton begins to wonder if he doesn't have more in common with this man than he should.
38	12	"Get Your Kicks on Routes 22 and 76"	Mort Lachman	Winston Moss	December 3, 1975
On their way to an out-of-town wedding, Clifton, Mama and the gang get sidetracked by a snowstorm and bad directions. Can they get to the wedding on time? Can they get through the night without killing each other?
39	13	"Clifton's Casual Fling"	Jerry Markus	Lloyd Garver & Winston Moss & Thad Mumford & David Pollock & Elias Davis	December 17, 1975
Clifton thinks his new girlfriend Sharon is "the one", and he's finally ready to settle down. Now all Sharon has to do is tell him she just wants to date.
40	14	"That's My Papa"	Stuart Margolin	Stuart Margolin	Unaired

== Home media ==
Sony Pictures Home Entertainment released both seasons on DVD in Region 1 on August 23, 2005. The majority of the episodes are presented on both DVD releases in their edited-for-syndication form. Only a handful of episodes are presented in their original, unedited form.

On June 13, 2017, Sony Pictures Home Entertainment released That's My Mama- The Complete Series on DVD in Region 1, with the same amount of edited episodes as the season sets.

DVD name	Ep #	Release date
Season 1	26	August 23, 2005
Season 2	13	August 23, 2005
Complete Series	39	June 13, 2017

== Cultural references ==
In the movie Coming to America, Eddie Murphy has a brief role as Randy Watson, who is explained by Arsenio Hall’s character, Reverend Brown, to have played “Joe the Policeman" in the (fictional) "What’s Goin' Down” episode of That's My Mama. The actor Randy Watson appeared as "Joe the Policeman" in "The Shakedown" episode.

In the Family Guy episode "Mr. Griffin Goes to Washington," Peter testifies before Congress. Trying to think of a snappy line with which to end his speech, he finally quips "Well, that's my mama!" (This was the tagline at the end of each That's My Mama episode's prologue.)

== Syndicated rebroadcast ==
Decades aired That's My Mama during their weekend binge marathon block on February 12–13, 2022, on February 3, 2024, on February 23, 2025, on August 10, 2025, on November 30, 2025, and January 18, 2026.
