= Barbara Montgomery =

American actress

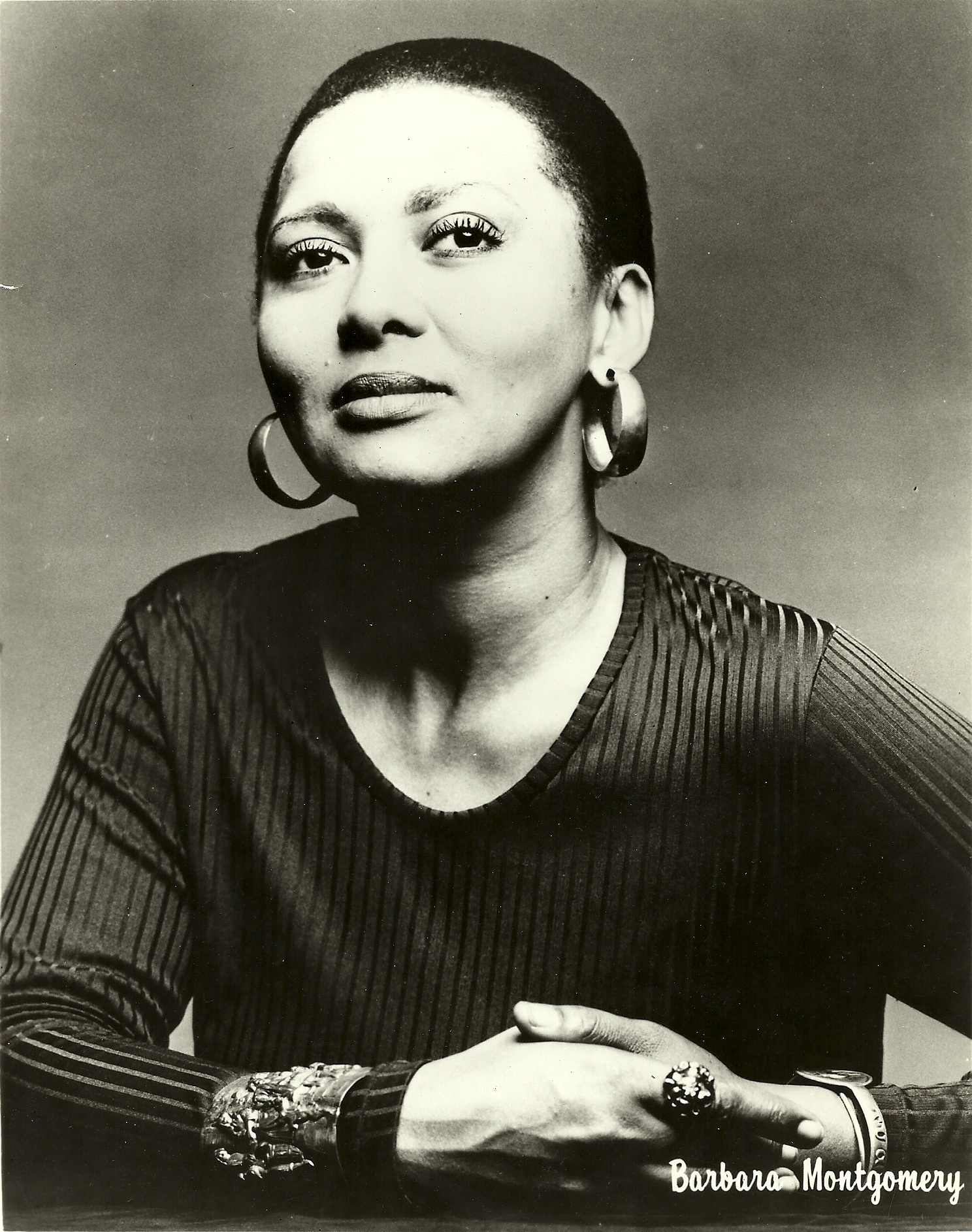
- Montgomery c. 1970s
- Occupations: Actress, theatrical and film director

Barbara Montgomery is an American stage, television and film actress, and theatrical and film director. She is best known for her performance in Amen (1986-1990).

== Career ==
Montgomery began her career on the stage in the 1960s in Off-Off-Broadway theatrical groups. She was a member of Negro Ensemble Company and the La MaMa Experimental Theatre Club. In the early 1970s, she starred as "Mama" in the Off-Broadway production of My Sister, My Sister for which she earned an Obie Award. The play later ran on Broadway from April to August 1974 for which Montgomery reprised her role.

In 1986, Montgomery won the role of Cassietta Hetebrink on the NBC sitcom Amen. Montgomery played the role for four years before leaving the series in 1990. Later that year, she starred in the short-lived ABC program Married People as Olivia Williams. She has also appeared on many shows such as A Different World, The Fresh Prince of Bel-Air, Disneyland, and Living Single.

In 2013, Montgomery made her directorial debut with the historical film Mitote, starring Ruby Dee and S. Epatha Merkerson.

== Work ==
Stage
Year	Play	Role	Notes
1974	My Sister, My Sister	Mama	
1975	The First Breeze of Summer	Aunt Edna	
1976	Kennedy's Children	Wanda	
1981	Inacent Black	Mana Essie Rydell	
1985	The Tap Dance Kid	Dulcie	
2008	Cat on a Hot Tin Roof	Dialect Coach	
Film
Year	Film	Role	Notes
1984	Moscow on the Hudson	Mrs. Marlowe	
1991	A Fond Little Memory		
1993	The Meteor Man	Dre's mother	
2001	Lift	France	
2007	Blackout	Mrs. Germaine	
Television
Year	Title	Role	Notes
1976	The First Breeze of Summer	Aunt Edna	Television movie
1985	Evergreen	Celeste	Miniseries
1986	A Fight for Jenny	Mrs. Martin	Television movie
1986–1990	Amen	Casietta Hetebrink	88 episodes
1989	The Women of Brewster Place	Miss Eva	Miniseries
1989	Polly	Mrs. Conley	Television movie
1990	Married People	Olivia Williams	Unknown episodes
1990	Polly: Comin' Home!	Mrs. Conley	Television movie
1992	A Different World	Imogene Douglas	2 episodes
1992	The Fresh Prince of Bel-Air	Irene Jones- Judge Carl Robertson's Mistress	1 episode
1993	Quantum Leap	Vivian	1 episode
1993	Bloodlines: Murder in the Family	Judge Barbara Daniels	Television movie
1993	Bodies of Evidence	Nurse Halli Mashler	1 episode
1994	Sister, Sister	Odessa	1 episode
1995	Women of the House	Sapphire Jones	1 episode
1995	Living Single	Ruth	1 episode
1995	Dave's World	Anna Dunham	1 episode
1996	ABC Afterschool Special	Geneva	1 episode
1999	Cosby	Betty	1 episode
2016	Grey's Anatomy	Louise	1 episode
