= Married People =

- Genre: Sitcom
- Created by: Prudence Fraser; Robert Sternin
- Written by: Prudence Fraser; Robert Rabinowitz; Robert Sternin
- Directed by: Asaad Kelada
- Starring: Ray Aranha; Bess Armstrong; Megan Gallivan; Barbara Montgomery; Jay Thomas; Chris Young
- Composer: Bob Boykin
- Country of origin: United States
- Original language: English
- No. of seasons: 1
- No. of episodes: 18

Production
- Executive producers: Prudence Fraser; Robert Sternin
- Producers: Asaad Kelada; Kathy Landsberg; Jan Siegelman
- Cinematography: Mark J. Levin
- Editor: Marco Zappia
- Running time: 30 minutes
- Production companies: Sternin & Fraser Ink, Inc. ELP Communications; Columbia Pictures Television

Original release
- Network: ABC
- Release: September 18, 1990 – March 16, 1991

Married People is an American television sitcom that aired on ABC as part of its 1990–91 schedule. It was a production of Sternin & Fraser Ink, Inc. in association with Columbia Pictures Television for ABC. It aired between September 18, 1990 and March 16, 1991. Jay Thomas and Bess Armstrong led the ensemble cast.

== Synopsis ==
The series follows three couples in different stages of their relationships who lived in the same building in New York City. Newlyweds Allen and Cindy Campbell (Chris Young and Megan Gallivan) were occupants of the third floor; he attended Columbia University while she supported them as a waitress. On the second floor were the Meyers, Russell (Jay Thomas) and Elizabeth (Bess Armstrong). Elizabeth was a lawyer while Russell was a free-lance writer and househusband, particularly after the birth of their son, Max. Living on the ground floor were Nick and Olivia Williams (Ray Aranha and Barbara Montgomery), an older couple who were the building's owners (the building was in a gentrified area of Harlem, but often referred to by the street name "Central Park North"). Nick was an irascible traditionalist who constantly wondered why Russell didn't go out and get a "real" job and found Allen to be "too white" ("even for a white boy"), but was basically a good, decent man.

Married People was critically acclaimed but garnered low ratings, particularly once it began being continually pre-empted by ABC News providing coverage of the Persian Gulf War. The series was cancelled in March 1991, but rerun in August and September of that year just prior to the beginning of the 1991–92 schedule.

== Episodes ==
No.	Title	Directed by	Written by	Original release date
1	"Married People"	Asaad Kelada	Robert Sternin & Prudence Fraser	September 18, 1990
2	"The Truth, the Whole Truth..."	Asaad Kelada	Unknown	September 19, 1990
3	"First Impression"	Asaad Kelada	Unknown	September 26, 1990
4	"Once More, With Passion"	Asaad Kelada	Unknown	October 3, 1990
5	"Money Changes Everything"	Asaad Kelada	Unknown	October 10, 1990
6	"Live and Let Go"	Asaad Kelada	Unknown	October 17, 1990
7	"Room for One More"	Asaad Kelada	Unknown	October 24, 1990
8	"Who You Gonna Call?"	Asaad Kelada	Debra Fasciano & Robert Rabinowitz & Gina Wendkos	October 31, 1990
9	"Term Paper"	Asaad Kelada	Unknown	November 7, 1990
10	"The Baby Cometh"	Asaad Kelada	Unknown	November 14, 1990
11	"Four Neighbors and a Baby"	Asaad Kelada	Unknown	November 28, 1990
12	"Partners"	Asaad Kelada	Unknown	December 5, 1990
13	"Compromise"	Will Mackenzie	Unknown	December 19, 1990
14	"To Live and Drive in New York"	Will Mackenzie	Unknown	December 26, 1990
15	"The Nanny"	Will Mackenzie	Unknown	January 9, 1991
16	"Mommy and Me"	Will Mackenzie	Unknown	January 23, 1991
17	"Dance Ten, Friends Zero"	Will Mackenzie	Eric Gilliland	January 30, 1991
18	"You Were Right and I Was..."	Will Mackenzie	Unknown	March 16, 1991

== Awards ==
Year	Award	Result	Category	Recipient
1991	Emmy Award	Won	Outstanding Technical Direction/Camera/Video for a Series	Marty Brown, Dave Owen, Rich Rose, Marvin Shearer, Mark Warshaw, and Jerry Weiss; For episode "Dance Ten, Friends Zero"
