= Stephen A. Miller =

American businessperson

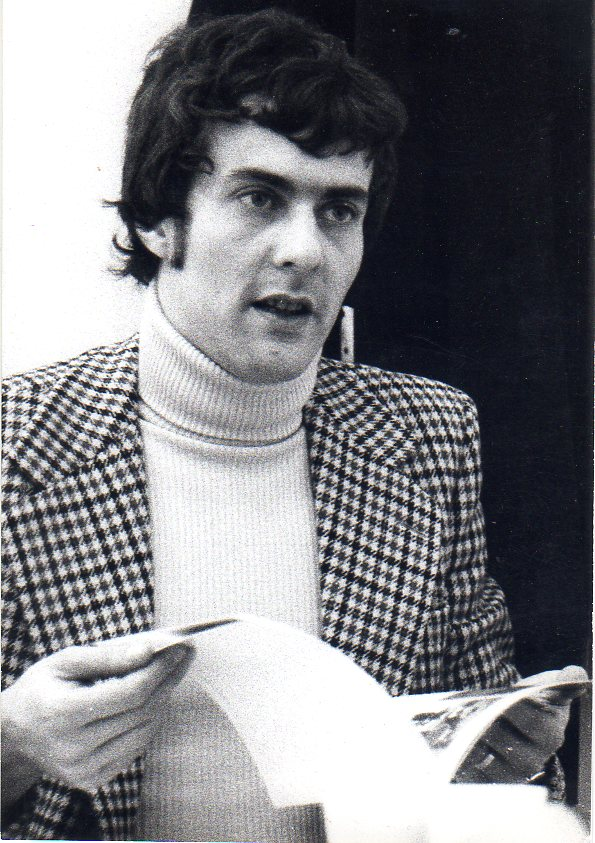
Miller at the 1972 Nuremberg Toy Fair

Stephen Alan Miller (May 31, 1940 – December 27, 1993) was an American businessperson. He was a restaurateur, pedagogical expert, and creator, manufacturer, and distributor of educational and creative toys, a number of which were sold at the Museum of Modern Art Gift Shop. He founded the café The Hip Bagel on MacDougel Street in New York City's Greenwich Village with NYC restaurateur Shelly Fireman in the early 1960s. He also founded the restaurant Avec. He created the 1•2•Kangaroo Toy Store, which was subsequently acquired by CBS Broadcasting as part of their Creative Playthings division. In 1969 he became the youngest president of a CBS division, Creative Playthings, at 29 years old. After leaving Creative Playthings in 1973, he became president of NOVO Toys, a subsidiary of the Sadlier Company. After Novo Toys, he then went on to Ruth Glasser, Inc, from 1977 to 1978, in the Toy Center at 1107 Broadway and was executive vice-president, responsible for the catalogue designed by Fredun Shapur. From 1979, until his death in 1993, he was president and major stockholder of the Willette Corporation, designers and manufacturers of vitreous china bathroom accessories in New Brunswick, New Jersey; a family business founded by his maternal grandparents, William and Ethel Elstein in 1921.

== Biography ==
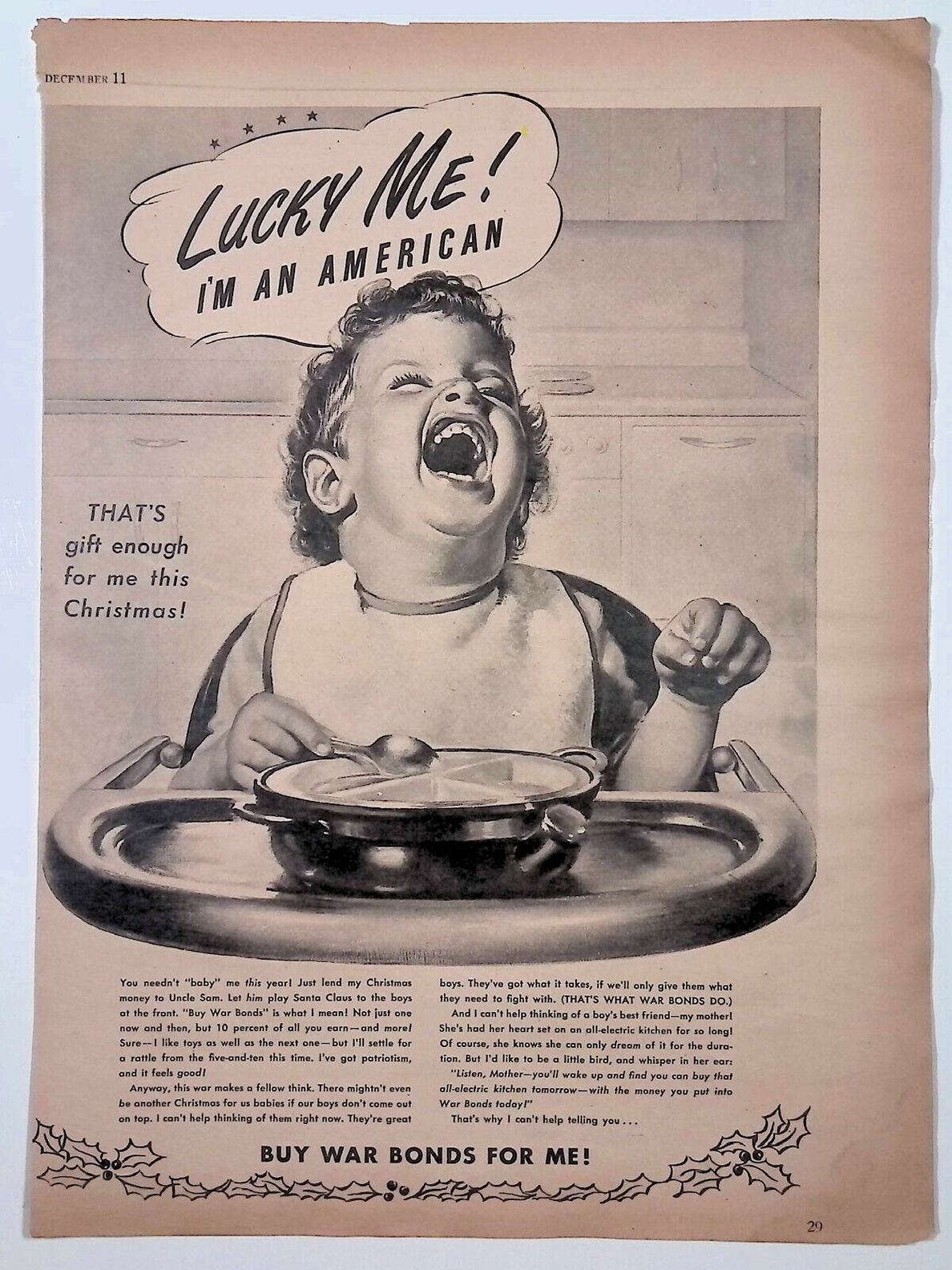
WWII War Bonds ad featuring Miller

Miller was one of America's first advertising baby models.He was the baby featured in certain U.S. government savings and war bonds advertisements, as well as the baby emptying a can of Sherwin Williams paint over his head on a giant Times Square billboard. He was a precocious and creative youngster who started his early entrepreneurial ventures with tiny theater performances. In his early teen years he created a Magic business complete with business cards, and was for hire as a magician at parties. His love of magic and his skill at it lasted throughout his lifetime. He also had aspirations of being an actor. He attended Temple University in 1958 for one year before moving to New York City in 1959.

== The Hip Bagel ==
Miller's first adult entrepreneurship was the creation of the popular 1960s café, The Hip Bagel, which opened in 1963 in Greenwich Village, NYC. The Hip Bagel logo with its bagel inspired "b" was designed by Stephen Miller. The Hip Bagel was written up in Earl Wilson's New York in a chapter entitled "Beardos, Weirdos, and Espressos". The Hip Bagel was also listed in the voluminous and renowned HART'S GUIDE to New York City. Stephen Miller went on to open his next restaurant venture, Avec.

== Avec ==
Avec, a French restaurant, opened in November 1964, located a block from The Hip Bagel on Bleecker Street, also in Greenwich Village. The menu at Avec was in the form of a Möbius strip and customers were given toys to play with as they waited for their orders. Stephen and Avec were written about in the November 17, 1964, issue of The New York Herald Tribune, in Priscilla Tucker's column.

== 1•2•Kangaroo ==
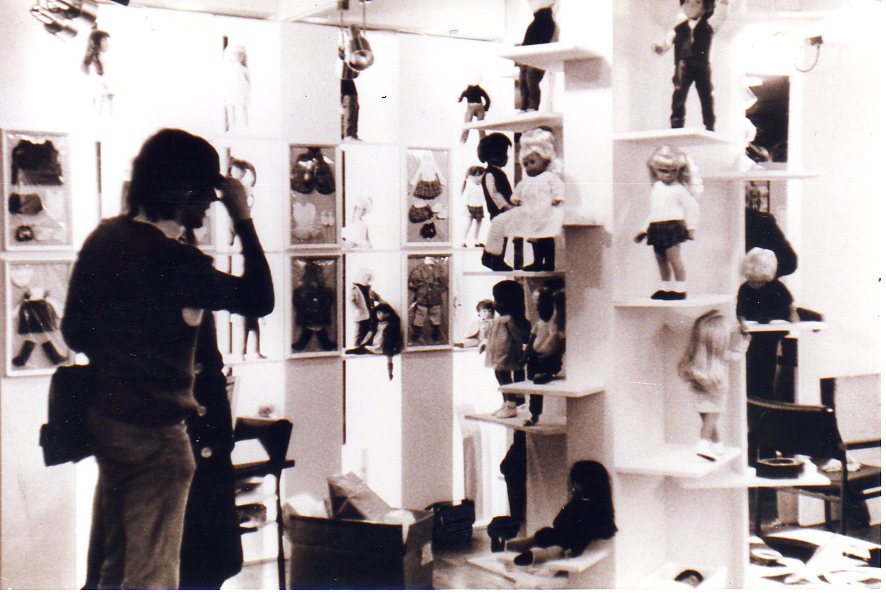
Miller with display of Sasha and Gregor dolls

At this time Stephen began what would become his lifelong focus on play and toys, and the effects of toys on the development of children and what kind of adults they become. He had recently established his unique toy store, 1•2•Kangaroo, located at the triangle corner of Greenwich Avenue and Seventh Avenue. This store sold unusual toys, both antique and modern. Stephen had negotiated for the exclusive American rights to import certain European toys by such distinguished designers as Lis and Kurt Naef of Naefspiele, Peer Clahsen, Fredun Shapur, Patrick Rylands, and many others. During this time he was photographed in the nude by Diane Arbus. The store was patronized by artists Joseph Cornell, whose boxes contained some items he bought there, and the painter Marcel Duchamp who visited the store frequently. Stephen Miller and all three of his Greenwich Village ventures, The Hip Bagel, 1•2•Kangaroo, and Avec were mentioned in the November 26, 1964, edition of the Village Voice. 1•2•Kangaroo was also listed in the voluminous and renowned HART'S GUIDE to New York City.

== Creative Playthings ==
CBS acquired 1•2•Kangaroo, along with the exclusive distribution rights to these European toys, and made Stephen Miller President of Creative Playthings, another CBS acquisition. He was the youngest President at 29 years old of a CBS Division. His office bookshelves were filled with toys in addition to books. Fredun Shapur, in addition to designing toys, puzzles and books for Creative Playthings also designed their new logo. Fredun's work from this time for Creative Playthings was featured in the September 23, 2014, edition of WIDEWALLS Magazine in a feature on Shapur's exhibition at Kemistry Gallery in London, U.K. Stephen and Creative Playthings® were featured in the January, 1970 issue of Esquire Magazine, as well as in articles in the January 1973 issue of Saturday Review. He also appeared on the David Susskind show discussing creative play for children on December 29, 1969, and in the film, Crayon People by Steven Skloot in 1982.
