= Marcia Levin =

American writer

- Born: October 29, 1918; Philadelphia, United States
- Died: April 18, 2006 (aged 87); Sarasota, Florida
- Occupation: Writer
- Spouse: Martin Levin
- Children: 3, including Jeremy Leven
- Writing career
- Period: 1951 to 1978
- Genre: Children's fiction
- Notable works: Donna Parker; The Merry Mailman; Tom Corbett
- Website: marcialevin.com

Marcia Lauter Obrasky Levin (October 29, 1918 – April 18, 2006) was a children's book author, sometimes using the pen name of Marcia Martin. She was creator of the Donna Parker series, as well as 22 books for beginning readers, and some of the first enrichment textbooks about the New Math.

== Biography ==
Levin was born and raised in Philadelphia, the daughter of Abraham N. Obrasky and Elizabeth Lauter Obrasky. Her father was a dentist. She graduated from Overbrook High School. She married writer, publisher, and lawyer Martin Levin in 1939. They had three children, including writer Jeremy Leven, publisher Hugh Lauter Levin, and psychologist and academic dean Wendy Newby. She lived in Rye, New York for 56 years. She died in Sarasota, Florida, in 2006, at the age of 87.

== Publications ==
The Chicago Tribune praised Levin and Bendick's Take Shapes, Lines, and Letters (1962) as "a dandy introduction to the world of mathematics without numbers."

=== Donna Parker Series ===
- Donna Parker, Special Agent (Whitman Books, 1957 - ISBN 978-987-776-522-9)
- Donna Parker on Her Own (Whitman Books, 1957)
- Donna Parker: A Spring to Remember (Whitman Books, 1960)
- Donna Parker at Cherrydale (World Distributors, 1961)
- Donna Parker in Hollywood (Whitman Books, 1961)
- Donna Parker Mystery at Arawak (Whitman Books, 1962)
- Donna Parker Takes a Giant Step (Whitman Books, 1964)

=== Tom Corbett Series ===
- Tom Corbett's A Trip to the Moon (Wonder Books, 1953)
- Tom Corbett's Wonder Book of Space (Wonder Books, 1953)

=== Classics Retold ===
- Anna Sewell's Black Beauty Retold For Little Children (Wonder Books, 1952)
- Peter Pan (Wonder Books, 1952) (illustrated by Beatrice Derwinski)
- Adventures From the Original Alice in Wonderland (Wonder Books, 1978)

=== The Merry Mailman Series ===
- The Merry Mailman (Treasure Books, 1953)
- The Merry Mailman Around the World (Treasure Books, 1955)

=== Mathematics ===
- Mathematics Illustrated Dictionary: Facts, Figures and People, Including the New Mathematics by Jeanne Bendick, Marcia Levin, Leonard Simon, Margaret Pickard. (Kaye & Ward Limited, ISBN 0-7182-0877-3)
- Take a Number: New Ideas + Imagination = More Fun (1961, with Jeanne Bendick)
- Take Shapes, Lines and Letters: New Horizons in Mathematics (1962, with Jeanne Bendick)
- New mathematics practice workbook Marcia Levin & Jeanne Bendick. Illustrated by Jeanne Bendick. (Grosset & Dunlap, 1966)

=== Other books ===
- A Little Cowboy's Christmas (Wonder Books, 1951)
- How the Clown Got His Smile (Wonder Books, 1951)
- Sonny the Lucky Bunny (World Distributors, 1952) (illustrated by Art Seiden)
- Waiting for Santa Claus: Christmas is coming (Wonder Books, 1952)
- Let's Take a Ride (Treasure Books, 1953)
- Johnny Grows Up (Wonder Books, 1954)
- Pushups and Pinups (1964, with Jeanne Bendick)
- Grandmother's Book (Galahad Books 1998)
