= James R. Stein =

American screenwriter

- Born: Chicago, Illinois, U.S.
- Occupations: Television producer, screenwriter
- Years active: 1973–present

James R. Stein is an American screenwriter and television producer. For his work on The Carol Burnett Show and the 1973 comedy special Lily, Stein has won two Primetime Emmy Awards.

== Selected filmography ==
Year	Title	Notes
1973	Sanford and Son	Writer, 3 episodes
1973	Lily (special)	Writer
1976–1977	One Day at a Time	Writer, 2 episodes
1976–1977	What's Happening!!	Writer, 2 episodes
1977–1979	Fernwood 2 Night	Writer, 39 episodes
1978-1979	America 2-Night	Writer, 65 episodes
1977-79	The Carol Burnett Show	Writer, 24 episodes
1979–1980	A New Kind of Family	Writer, 3 episodes
1980–1981	Flo	Writer, 8 episodes Producer, 48 episodes
1981–1983	Private Benjamin	Writer, 2 episodes Producer, 13 episodes
1982–1986	Silver Spoons	Writer, 19 episodes Executive Producer, 24 episodes Supervising Producer, 48 episodes
1984–1985	Double Trouble	Writer, 2 episodes
1986	The Motown Revue Starring Smokey Robinson	Writer, 6 episodes Executive Producer, 6 episodes
1990-1991	Amen	Writer, 5 episodes Executive Producer, 24 episodes
1993–1995	Family Matters	Writer, 3 episodes
1994-1996	Nightstand with Dick Dietrick	Writer, 96 episodes Executive Producer
2000–2002	Son of the Beach	Writer, 36 episodes Executive producer, 40 episodes
