= Bahamian Americans =

Americans of Bahamian birth or descent

Total population
- 56,797 (2019)

Regions with significant populations
- Majority in states include Florida (Greater Miami), Georgia (Metro Atlanta), Alabama, Kentucky, Maryland, Delaware, New York (Greater New York), Pennsylvania, Massachusetts, Minnesota, Texas, Washington, Colorado and California; Smaller numbers parts of the country including New Jersey, Rhode Island, Connecticut, Illinois, Wisconsin, Virginia, North Carolina, Missouri, Iowa, South Dakota and Tennessee

Languages
- English (American English, Bahamian English), Bahamian Creole

Religion
- Anglicanism · Baptism · Church of God · Methodism · Roman Catholicism · Obeah · Islam (minority)

Bahamian Americans are an ethnic group of Caribbean Americans of Bahamian ancestry. There are an estimated 56,797 people of Bahamian ancestry living in the US as of 2019.

== Bahamian Immigration ==
Bahamians began visiting the Florida Keys in the 18th century to salvage wrecked ships, fish, catch turtles and log tropical hardwood trees. A Bahamian settlement in the Keys was reported in 1790, but the presence of Bahamians in the Keys was temporary. Early in the 19th century some 30 to 40 Bahamian ships were working in the Keys every year. After 1825, Bahamian wreckers began moving to Key West in large numbers.

Bahamians were among the first West Indians to immigrate to the mainland US in the late nineteenth century. Many went to Florida to work in agriculture or to Key West to labor in fishing, sponging, and turtling. Two main factors that contributed to increased Bahamian migration were the poor economic climate and opportunities in the Bahamas, as well as the short distance from the Bahamas to Miami. Southern Florida developed Bahamian enclaves in certain cities including Lemon City, Coconut Grove, and Cutler. In 1896, foreign-born blacks comprised 40 percent of the black population of Miami, making Miami the largest foreign-born black city in the US aside from New York. Bahamians in Florida created their own institutions, most notably Episcopal churches. Initially, Miami was a relative place of tolerance for blacks because Miami was so disconnected from the rest of the United States. Blacks were originally allowed to vote in Miami and about 44% of people who voted to incorporate Miami in 1896 were black. Without the black voters, Miami could not have reached the minimum 300 voters required under state law for a city to incorporate. However, things would decline for Miami blacks soon after incorporation as the city became more connected to the rest of the US, and blacks would not be allowed to vote again in Miami until the 1960s. In the early 20th century in Miami, blacks could not vote, were persecuted by epithets in Miami press, and were not allowed to stay in the hotels that employed them. In 1921, the Ku Klux Klan staged a large rally attacking Bahamian immigrants in Miami.

Between 1900 and 1920 between ten and twelve thousand Bahamians moved to Florida, mostly to do agricultural labor, often on a seasonal basis. Florida farmers convinced the U.S. Congress to exempt Caribbean and Latin American émigrés from the Emergency Quota Act of 1921. Starting in 1943 Bahamian workers came to Florida under the British West Indian (BWI) Temporary Labor Program. This program was under the control of private growers from 1947 to 1966. Growers favored Bahamian workers because they "can be forced to work a regular work program or be deported."

== Communities ==
The majority of Bahamian Americans, about 21,000 in total, live in and around Miami, with the Bahamian community centered in the Coconut Grove neighborhood in Miami. There is also a growing Bahamian American population in the Atlanta and Oklahoma City areas.

Although the majority of Bahamian Americans live in the Southern United States, a large population can be found in the New York City area, with the population particularly centered in Harlem. Bahamian Americans in the New York City area regularly provide cultural education and entertainment, particularly due to the Office of the Bahamas Consulate General in New York being located in the city.

White Bahamian Americans in Florida were often referred to as "Conchs," and their communities in Key West and Riviera Beach were sometimes referred to as "Conch Towns." In 1939, the Works Progress Administration (WPA) conducted a study of white Bahamian Americans in Riviera Beach, eventually published as Conchtown USA. Many white Bahamians also settled in Miami, particularly in the Coconut Grove neighborhood, and in Tarpon Springs.

=== US communities with high percentages of people of Bahamian ancestry ===
The top US communities with the highest percentage of people claiming Bahamian ancestry are:

1. Miami Gardens, Florida 17.01%
2. Canal Point, Florida 5.1%
3. Seminole Manor, Florida 3.6%
4. Brownsville, Florida 3.3%
5. Gladeview, Florida 3%
6. Archer, Florida 2.5%
7. West Park, Florida 2.1%
8. Ives Estates, Florida 2%
9. Westview, Florida 1.5%
10. West Little River, Florida 1.4%

== Culture ==
Bahamian Americans have retained much of their cultural heritage. Bahamian Americans listen to and perform Junkanoo and rake-and-scrape music, engage in the classic art of West Indian storytelling about characters like Anansi, and create Bahamian-style art, especially straw weaving and canvas art.

Bahamian foods staples such as conch, peas and rice, Johnny cake, and desserts including duff (food)s (especially guava) continue to be made by Bahamian Americans. Bahamian dialect is also spoken by many Bahamian Americans, especially in Florida.

== Education ==
As of 2010, Bahamian Americans were the most educated West Indian Americans in the USA. 39.1% of the Bahamian American population of 25 years and over held college degrees. There were 22,763 Bahamian Americans 25 years and older in the country according to the 2010 census. 9.9% held associate degrees, 17.5% held bachelor's degrees, and 11.7% held graduate or professional degrees. 29.2% held bachelor's degrees or higher.

In New York State, 46.7% of Bahamian Americans 25 years and older held degrees. 18.5% held Graduate or Professional degrees, 20.6% held bachelor's degrees, with 7.6% holding associate degrees.

In Georgia 51.1% of Bahamian Americans 25 years and older held college degrees. 18.6% held Graduate or Professional degrees, 25.1% held bachelor's degrees, with 7.4% holding associate degrees.

In Florida 32% of Bahamian Americans 25 years and older held college degrees. 7.8% held Graduate or Professional degrees, 12.6% held bachelor's degrees, with 11.6% holding associate degrees.

== Economy ==
In 2010 census the average Bahamian American family household earned $61,070 annually, with the average household earning about $57,000. The median income for family household was $46,196 and the median for household was $42,000.

35 percent of working Bahamian Americans had occupations in Business, science, and arts, 27 percent had positions in sales and office occupations, 24 percent had occupation in service related jobs, 6 percent held jobs in natural resources, construction and maintenance, and 8% in production, transportation, and material moving.

About 20% of the Bahamian American population were living in poverty in 2010.

== Organizations ==
Both the Bahamian American Cultural Society and the Bahamian American Association Inc., the largest Bahamian American organizations in the United States, are located in Manhattan. These organizations provide cultural education services, social opportunities, and genealogical records to Bahamian Americans and those interested in Bahamian and Bahamian American culture.

The National Association of the Bahamas, located in Miami, offers primarily social opportunities for the local Bahamian American community.

The Council for Concerned Bahamians Abroad is a foundation which represents the interests and concerns of Bahamians, and Friends of the Bahamas domiciled outside the Bahamas. Its primary role is to serve as a voice for the economic and family interests of its constituents, and to monitor, analyze, and report on issues and policies that affect these interests. It also operates "Bring It Home Initiatives" (BIHI), projects designed to assist in the development of the Bahamas in seven areas, Education, Business & Industry, Investments & Financial Services, Health & Social Development, Community Development & Sports, Arts & Entertainment, and Tourism.

== Notable Bahamian-Americans ==
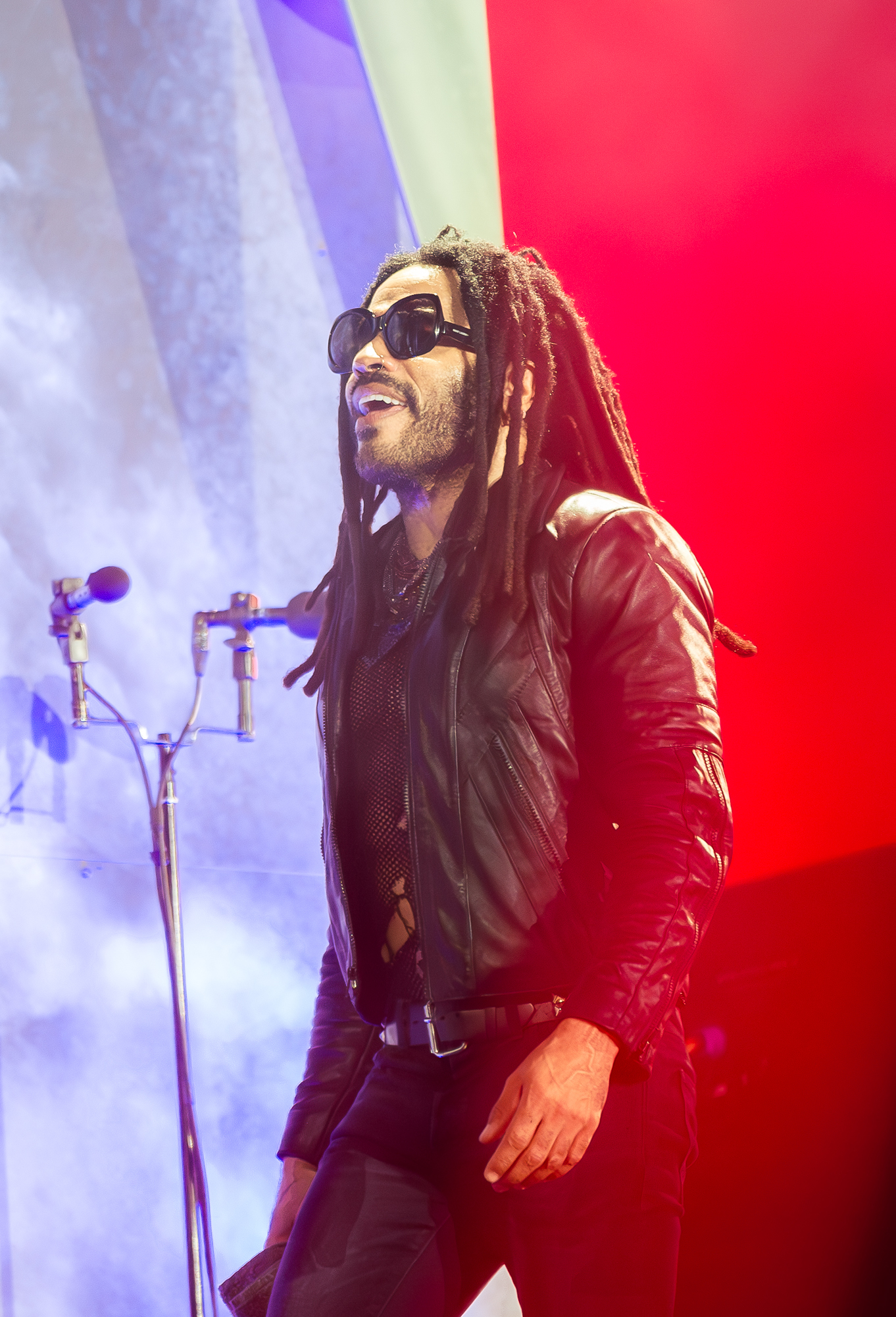
Lenny Kravitz

- Charles Donald Albury, pilot on Hiroshima and Nagasaki missions
- Rosanna Carter, Bahamian born American stage and film actress
- Jazz Chisholm Jr., MLB baseball player
- Wendy Coakley-Thompson, fiction writer
- Tee Corinne, artist and gay rights activist
- John Culmer, civil rights activist
- Denzel Curry, rapper
- W.E.B. Du Bois, sociologist, writer, historian, and Pan-Africanist civil rights activist; grandfather was born in the Bahamas
- Estelle Evans, Bahamian born American actress
- Kevin "Kimbo Slice" Ferguson, mixed martial artist, professional boxer, and actor
- Stepin Fetchit, vaudevillian, comedian, and film actor; first black person to become a millionaire from acting
- Rick Fox, NBA basketball player
- Eric Gordon, NBA player
- Donald R. Hopkins, public-health physician, MacArthur Fellow
- Al Horford, NBA player from Dominican Republic with Bahamian roots
- J. Rosamond Johnson, musician, composer and performer
- James Weldon Johnson, author, composer and educator
- Lenny Kravitz, singer, musician, songwriter, record producer, and actor
- Zoë Kravitz, actress, singer, and filmmaker
- Shakara Ledard, model
- Alano Miller, actor
- Isaiah Mobley (born 1999), basketball player for Hapoel Jerusalem of the Israeli Basketball Premier League and the EuroCup.
- Walter T. Mosley, legislator from the New York Assembly
- Tahj Mowry, actor
- Tamera Mowry, actress, television host, model, author, businesswoman, singer
- Tia Mowry, actress, model, author, businesswoman, vocalist
- Sidney Poitier, actor, film director, activist, and diplomat
- J. Gary Pretlow, legislator from the New York Assembly
- SpaceGhostPurrp, rapper
- M. Athalie Range, civil rights activist and politician, first Black American to be elected to the Miami city commission and the first woman to head a Florida state agency
- Al Roker, meteorologist, journalist, and television personality
- Roxie Roker, actress
- Esther Rolle, actress
- Brandon Russell, Neo-Nazi leader
- Ryan Sweeting, American professional tennis player
- Niara Sudarkasa, educator, author, and anthropologist
- Klay Thompson, NBA basketball player
- Mychal Thompson, retired NBA basketball player
- Trayce Thompson, MLB baseball player
- T-Pain, rapper
- Persia White, actress and singer
- Bert Williams, Bahamian born American entertainer
- Michael K. Williams, actor; mother with Bahamian roots
- Frederica Wilson, U.S House of Representatives from Florida's 24th district

== See also ==
- List of residents of the Bahamas
- Bahamas–United States relations
