= Estelle Evans =

American actress (1906–1985)

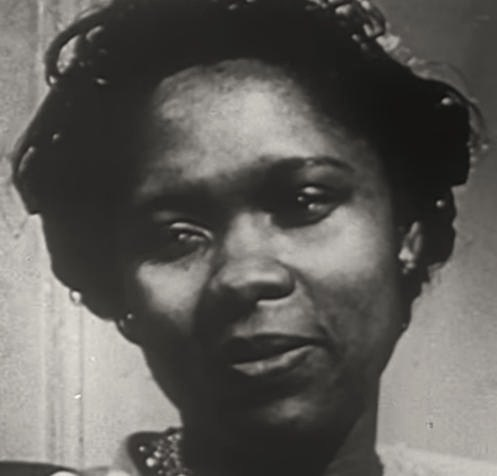
- Evans in The Quiet One, 1948
- Born: Estelle Rolle; October 1, 1906; Nassau, Bahamas
- Died: July 20, 1985 (aged 78); New York City, U.S.
- Occupation: Actress
- Years active: 1919–1984
- Spouse: Walter Evans
- Children: 3
- Relatives: Rosanna Carter; Esther Rolle (sisters; both deceased)
- Awards: 1969 NAACP Image Award for Outstanding Actress in a Motion Picture The Learning Tree

Estelle Rolle Evans (October 1, 1906 – July 20, 1985) was a Bahamian-American actress during the 20th century. Some of her more famous appearances were in the movies The Quiet One (1948), To Kill a Mockingbird (1962), and The Learning Tree (1969).

Evans was the older sister of actresses Rosanna Carter and Esther Rolle.

== Biography ==
Evans was born Estelle Rolle on October 1, 1906, in Exuma, Bahamas to parents Jonathan and Elizabeth Iris Rolle (née Dames). She was the oldest of 18 children. Her father moved to Florida to work for the railway; the family followed in 1920.

Evans attended Florida Memorial College or Florida A&M University and became a teacher at Pompano Beach Elementary School. She married to Walter Evans, an architectural draftsman and the couple moved to New York City in 1935. Evans worked as a teacher at PS 156 in Manhattan.

In New York, Evans studied drama at Hunter College, and at American Negro Theater alongside Sidney Poitier and Harry Belafonte.

Evans played the mother in The Quiet One and Calpurnia in the 1962 film version of To Kill a Mockingbird and acted in several other major movies and television shows. For her work in The Learning Tree, she received the NAACP Image Award for Outstanding Actress in a Motion Picture.

Evans died on July 20, 1985, in New York City, and she was buried in Westview Community Cemetery in Pompano Beach, Florida. She was age 76. She was survived by 1 son and 1 daughter.

== Filmography ==
Film and television appearances of Estelle Evans
Title	Year	Role	Notes
Daddy-Long-Legs	1919		Uncredited
The Quiet One	1948	The Mother	documentary
To Kill a Mockingbird	1962	Calpurnia	
Naked City	1963	Crossing Guard	TV series
The Learning Tree	1969	Sarah	
The Jeffersons	1975	Mary	TV series
Good Times	1975	Alice	TV series
A Piece of the Action	1977	Alberta Ballard	
See China and Die	1981	1st Maid	TV movie
The Clairvoyant	1982	Francine	
Tales of the Unknown South	1984		TV movie, segment "The Half-Pint Flask"
