= NAACP Image Award for Outstanding Actress in a Motion Picture =

American annual film award

NAACP Image Award for Best Actress in a Motion Picture
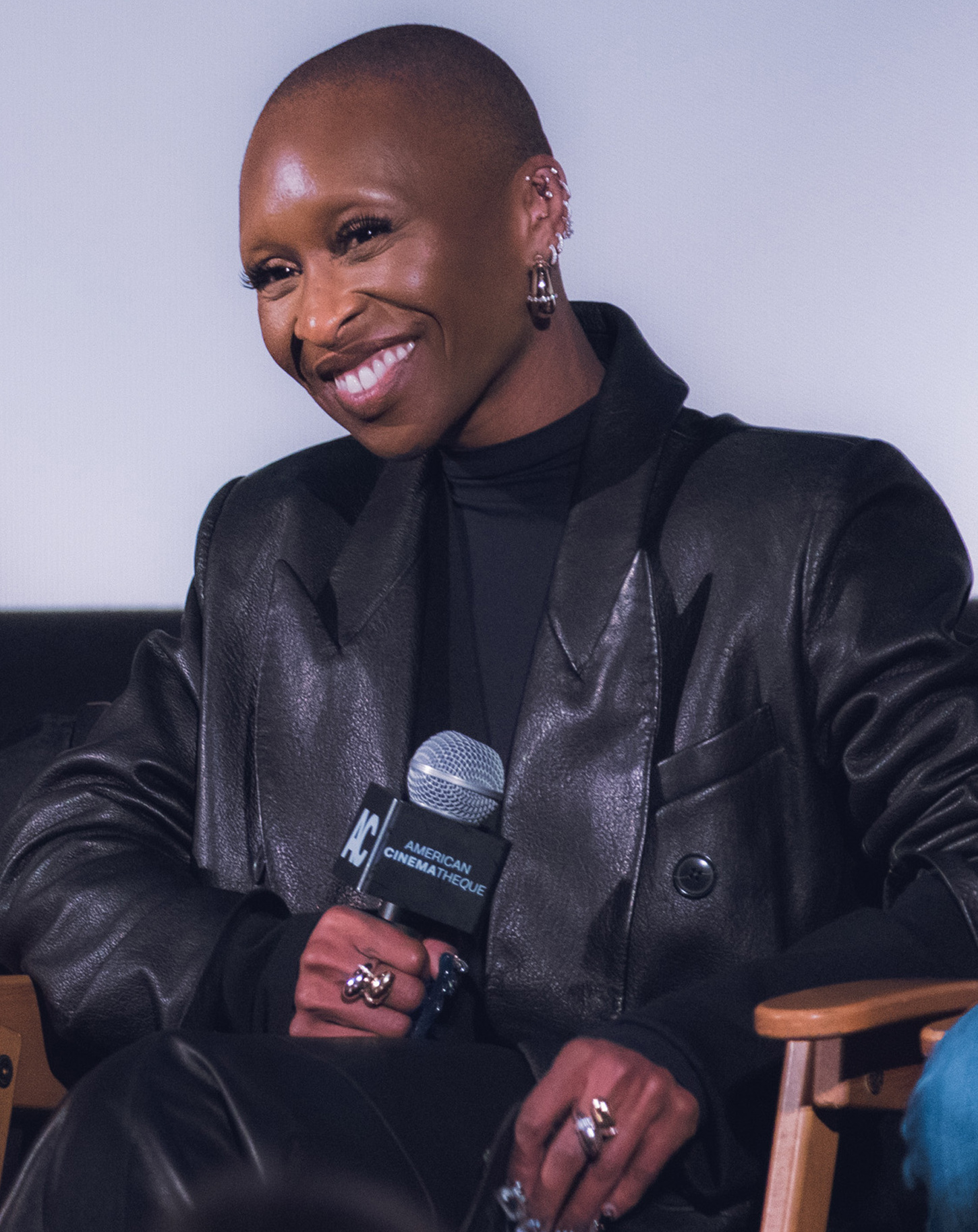
- The 2026 recipient: Cynthia Erivo
- Awarded for: Outstanding Performance by a Female Actor in a Leading Role in a Motion Picture
- Presented by: NAACP
- First award: Estelle Evans for The Learning Tree (1969)
- Currently held by: Cynthia Erivo for Wicked: For Good (2026)

Highlights
- Most awards: Angela Bassett (5)
- Most nominations: Halle Berry (11)

This article lists the winners and nominees for the NAACP Image Award for Outstanding Actress in a Motion Picture. The award has also been called Outstanding Lead Actress in a Motion Picture. Out of 12 films which featured African-Americans in leading roles in 1980, Cicely Tyson was the only female in that category. She played opposite Richard Pryor in Bustin' Loose. Because of this, she and officials at the annual NAACP Image Awards program decided that she should not accept the award.

== Winners and nominees ==
For each year in the tables below, the winner is listed first and highlighted in bold.

=== 1960s ===
Year	Actress	Film	Ref
1969	**Estelle Evans**	**The Learning Tree**	

=== 1970s ===
Year	Actress	Film	Ref
1970	**Barbara McNair**	**If He Hollers Let Him Go**	
1971	**Jane Fonda**	**Klute**	
1971	Virginia Capers	Big Jake	
1971	Susan Clark	Skin Game	
1971	Rosalind Cash	The Omega Man	
1971	Stephanie Faulkner	The Bus Is Coming	
1971	Diana Sands	Doctors' Wives	
1972	**Diana Ross**	**Lady Sings The Blues**	
1973	—N/a		
1974	**Ester Anderson**	**A Warm December**	
1974	Yvonne Elliman	Jesus Christ Superstar	
1974	Paula Kelly	The Spook Who Sat by the Door	
1974	Janet MacLachlan	Maurie	
1974	Paulene Myers	Maurie	
1975	**Diahann Carroll**	**Claudine**	
1975	Rosalind Cash	Uptown Saturday Night	
1975	Vonetta McGee	Thomasine & Bushrod	
1975	Madge Sinclair	Conrack	
1975	Clarice Taylor	Five on the Black Hand Side	
1976	**Denise Nicholas**	**Let's Do It Again**	
1977	**Cicely Tyson**	**The River Niger**	
1978	**Cicely Tyson**	**A Hero Ain't Nothin' but a Sandwich**	
1979	**Mavis Washington**	**Fastbreak**	

=== 1980s ===
Year	Actress	Film	Ref
1980	**Irene Cara**	**Fame**	
1981	—N/a		
1982	**Jayne Kennedy**	**Body and Soul**	
1982	Wilhelmenia Fernandez	Diva	
1982	Rosalind Cash	Wrong is Right	
1983	**Jennifer Beals**	**Flashdance**	
1983	Pam Grier	Tough Enough	
1983	Diahnne Abbott	The King of Comedy	
1984	**Alfre Woodard**	**Cross Creek**	
1985	**Tina Turner**	**Mad Max Beyond Thunderdome**	
1986	**Whoopi Goldberg**	**The Color Purple**	
1987	**Traci Wolfe**	**Lethal Weapon**	
1987	Nichelle Nichols	Star Trek IV: The Voyage Home	
1987	Helen Martin	Hollywood Shuffle	
1987	Kelly Jo Minter	Summer School	
1987	Sandra Reaves-Phillips	'Round Midnight	
1988	**Whoopi Goldberg**	**Fatal Beauty**	
1988	Pam Grier	Above the Law	
1988	C.C.H. Pounder	Bagdad Café	
1988	Beverly Todd	Moving	
1989	**Ruby Dee**	**Do the Right Thing**	
1989	Whoopi Goldberg	Clara's Heart	
1989	Sheryl Lee Ralph	The Mighty Quinn	
1989	Beverly Todd	Lean on Me	

=== 1990s ===
Year	Actress	Film	Ref
1990	—N/a		
1991	—N/a		
1992	**Whoopi Goldberg**	**The Long Walk Home**	
1992	Tyra Ferrell	Boyz n the Hood	
1992	Ruby Dee	Jungle Fever	
1992	Lonette McKee	Jungle Fever	
1992	Mary Alice	To Sleep with Anger	
1992	Robin Givens	A Rage in Harlem	
1993	**Whoopi Goldberg**	**Sister Act**	
1993	Halle Berry	Boomerang	
1993	Robin Givens	Boomerang	
1993	Alfre Woodard	Grand Canyon	
1993	Rosie Perez	White Men Can't Jump	
1994	**Angela Bassett**	**What's Love Got to Do with It**	
1994	Whitney Houston	The Bodyguard	
1994	Janet Jackson	Poetic Justice	
1994	Leleti Khumalo	Sarafina!	
1994	Alfre Woodard	Bopha!	
1995	—N/a		
1996	**Angela Bassett**	**Waiting to Exhale**	
1996	Jennifer Beals	Devil in a Blue Dress	
1996	Halle Berry	Losing Isaiah	
1996	Whoopi Goldberg	Boys on the Side	
1996	Whitney Houston	Waiting to Exhale	
1997	**Whitney Houston**	**The Preacher's Wife**	
1997	Whoopi Goldberg	Ghosts of Mississippi	
1997	Queen Latifah	Set It Off	
1997	Jada Pinkett Smith	Set It Off	
1997	Phylicia Rashad	Once Upon a Time... When We Were Colored	
1998	**Vanessa Williams**	**Soul Food**	
1998	Vivica A. Fox	Soul Food	
1998	Pam Grier	Jackie Brown	
1998	Nia Long	Love Jones	
1998	Lynn Whitfield	Eve's Bayou	
1999	**Angela Bassett**	**How Stella Got Her Groove Back**	
1999	Halle Berry	Bulworth	
1999	Regina King	Enemy of the State	
1999	Oprah Winfrey	Beloved	
1999	Alfre Woodard	Down in the Delta	

=== 2000s ===
Year	Actress	Film	Ref
2000	**Nia Long**	**The Best Man**	
2000	Monica Calhoun	The Best Man	
2000	Rosario Dawson	Light It Up	
2000	Lisa Gay Hamilton	True Crime	
2000	Debbi Morgan	The Hurricane	
2001	**Sanaa Lathan**	**Love and Basketball**	
2001	Angela Bassett	Boesman and Lena	
2001	Nia Long	Big Momma's House	
2001	Jada Pinkett Smith	Bamboozled	
2001	Vanessa Williams	Shaft	
2002	**Halle Berry**	**Swordfish**	
2002	Vivica A. Fox	Two Can Play That Game	
2002	Whoopi Goldberg	Kingdom Come	
2002	Regina King	Down to Earth	
2002	Alfre Woodard	K-PAX	
2003	**Angela Bassett**	**Sunshine State**	
2003	Vivica A. Fox	Juwanna Mann	
2003	Sanaa Lathan	Brown Sugar	
2003	Jennifer Lopez	Maid in Manhattan	
2003	Thandie Newton	The Truth About Charlie	
2004	**Queen Latifah**	**Bringing Down the House**	
2004	Halle Berry	Gothika	
2004	Beyoncé	The Fighting Temptations	
2004	Keisha Castle-Hughes	Whale Rider	
2004	Gabrielle Union	Deliver Us from Eva	
2005	**Kerry Washington**	**Ray**	
2005	Angela Bassett	Mr. 3000	
2005	Kimberly Elise	Woman Thou Art Loosed	
2005	Irma P. Hall	The Ladykillers	
2005	Gabrielle Union	Breakin' All the Rules	
2006	**Kimberly Elise**	**Diary of a Mad Black Woman**	
2006	Rosario Dawson	Rent	
2006	Queen Latifah	Beauty Shop	
2006	Zoe Saldaña	Guess Who	
2006	Zhang Ziyi	Memoirs of a Geisha	
2007	**Keke Palmer**	**Akeelah and the Bee**	
2007	Beyoncé	Dreamgirls	
2007	Penélope Cruz	Volver	
2007	Sanaa Lathan	Something New	
2007	Queen Latifah	Last Holiday	
2008	**Jurnee Smollett**	**The Great Debaters**	
2008	Halle Berry	Things We Lost in the Fire	
2008	Taraji P. Henson	Talk to Me	
2008	Angelina Jolie	A Mighty Heart	
2008	Jill Scott	Why Did I Get Married?	
2009	**Rosario Dawson**	**Seven Pounds**	
2009	Angela Bassett	Meet the Browns	
2009	Dakota Fanning	The Secret Life of Bees	
2009	Queen Latifah	The Secret Life of Bees	
2009	Alfre Woodard	The Family That Preys	

=== 2010s ===
Year	Actress	Film	Ref
2010	**Gabourey Sidibe**	**Precious**	
2010	Sandra Bullock	The Blind Side	
2010	Taraji P. Henson	I Can Do Bad All By Myself	
2010	Sophie Okonedo	Skin	
2010	Anika Noni Rose	The Princess and the Frog	
2011	**Halle Berry**	**Frankie & Alice**	
2011	Janet Jackson	Why Did I Get Married Too?	
2011	Queen Latifah	Just Wright	
2011	Zoe Saldaña	The Losers	
2011	Kerry Washington	Night Catches Us	
2012	**Viola Davis**	**The Help**	
2012	Paula Patton	Jumping the Broom	
2012	Adepero Oduye	Pariah	
2012	Zoe Saldaña	Colombiana	
2012	Emma Stone	The Help	
2013	**Viola Davis**	**Won't Back Down**	
2013	Halle Berry	Cloud Atlas	
2013	Emayatzy Corinealdi	Middle of Nowhere	
2013	Loretta Devine	In the Hive	
2013	Quvenzhané Wallis	Beasts of the Southern Wild	
2014	**Angela Bassett**	**Black Nativity**	
2014	Nicole Beharie	42	
2014	Halle Berry	The Call	
2014	Jennifer Hudson	Winnie Mandela	
2014	Kerry Washington	Peeples	
2015	**Taraji P. Henson**	**No Good Deed**	
2015	Viola Davis	The Disappearance of Eleanor Rigby	
2015	Gugu Mbatha-Raw	Belle	
2015	Tessa Thompson	Dear White People	
2015	Quvenzhané Wallis	Annie	
2016	**Sanaa Lathan**	**The Perfect Guy**	
2016	Viola Davis	Lila & Eve	
2016	Keke Palmer	Brotherly Love	
2016	Teyonah Parris	Chi-Raq	
2016	Zoe Saldaña	Infinitely Polar Bear	
2017	**Taraji P. Henson**	**Hidden Figures**	
2017	Angela Bassett	London Has Fallen	
2017	Madina Nalwanga	Queen of Katwe	
2017	Ruth Negga	Loving	
2017	Tika Sumpter	Southside with You	
2018	**Octavia Spencer**	**Gifted**	
2018	Halle Berry	Kidnap	
2018	Danai Gurira	All Eyez on Me	
2018	Natalie Paul	Crown Heights	
2018	Amandla Stenberg	Everything, Everything	
2019	**Amandla Stenberg**	**The Hate U Give**	
2019	Viola Davis	Widows	
2019	Sanaa Lathan	Nappily Ever After	
2019	KiKi Layne	If Beale Street Could Talk	
2019	Constance Wu	Crazy Rich Asians	

=== 2020s ===
Year	Actress	Film	Ref
2020	**Lupita Nyong'o**	**Us**	
2020	Cynthia Erivo	Harriet	
2020	Naomie Harris	Black and Blue	
2020	Jodie Turner-Smith	Queen & Slim	
2020	Alfre Woodard	Clemency	
2021	**Viola Davis**	**Ma Rainey's Black Bottom**	
2021	Issa Rae	The Photograph	
2021	Janelle Monáe	Antebellum	
2021	Madalen Mills	Jingle Jangle: A Christmas Journey	
2021	Tracee Ellis Ross	The High Note	
2022	**Jennifer Hudson**	**Respect**	
2022	Andra Day	The United States vs. Billie Holiday	
2022	Halle Berry	Bruised	
2022	Tessa Thompson	Passing	
2022	Zendaya	Malcolm & Marie	
2023	**Viola Davis**	**The Woman King**	
2023	Danielle Deadwyler	Till	
2023	Regina Hall	Honk for Jesus. Save Your Soul.	
2023	Keke Palmer	Alice	
2023	Letitia Wright	Black Panther: Wakanda Forever	
2024	**Fantasia Barrino**	**The Color Purple**	
2024	Aunjanue Ellis-Taylor	Origin	
2024	Halle Bailey	The Little Mermaid	
2024	Teyana Taylor	A Thousand and One	
2024	Yara Shahidi	Sitting in Bars with Cake	
2025	**Kerry Washington**	**The Six Triple Eight**	
2025	Cynthia Erivo	Wicked	
2025	Regina King	Shirley	
2025	Lupita Nyong'o	A Quiet Place: Day One	
2025	Lashana Lynch	Bob Marley: One Love	
2026	**Cynthia Erivo**	**Wicked: For Good**	
2026	Danielle Deadwyler	40 Acres	
2026	Keke Palmer	One of Them Days	
2026	Kerry Washington	Shadow Force	
2026	Tessa Thompson	Hedda	

== Multiple wins and nominations ==
=== Wins ===
5 wins

- Angela Bassett

4 wins

- Viola Davis
- Whoopi Goldberg

2 wins

- Halle Berry
- Taraji P. Henson
- Cicely Tyson
- Sanaa Lathan
- Kerry Washington

=== Nominations ===
11 nominations

- Halle Berry

9 nominations

- Angela Bassett

7 nominations

- Viola Davis
- Whoopi Goldberg

6 nominations

- Queen Latifah
- Alfre Woodard

5 nominations

- Sanaa Lathan
- Kerry Washington

4 nominations

- Taraji P. Henson
- Keke Palmer
- Zoe Saldaña

3 nominations

- Rosalind Cash
- Rosario Dawson
- Cynthia Erivo
- Pam Grier
- Vivica A. Fox
- Whitney Houston
- Nia Long
- Tessa Thompson

2 nominations

- Jennifer Beals
- Beyoncé
- Danielle Deadwyler
- Ruby Dee
- Kimberly Elise
- Robin Givens
- Jennifer Hudson
- Janet Jackson
- Regina King
- Amandla Stenberg
- Jada Pinkett Smith
- Beverly Todd
- Cicely Tyson
- Gabrielle Union
- Quvenzhané Wallis
- Vanessa Williams
