= Westview Community Cemetery =

Cemetery in Pompano Beach, Florida

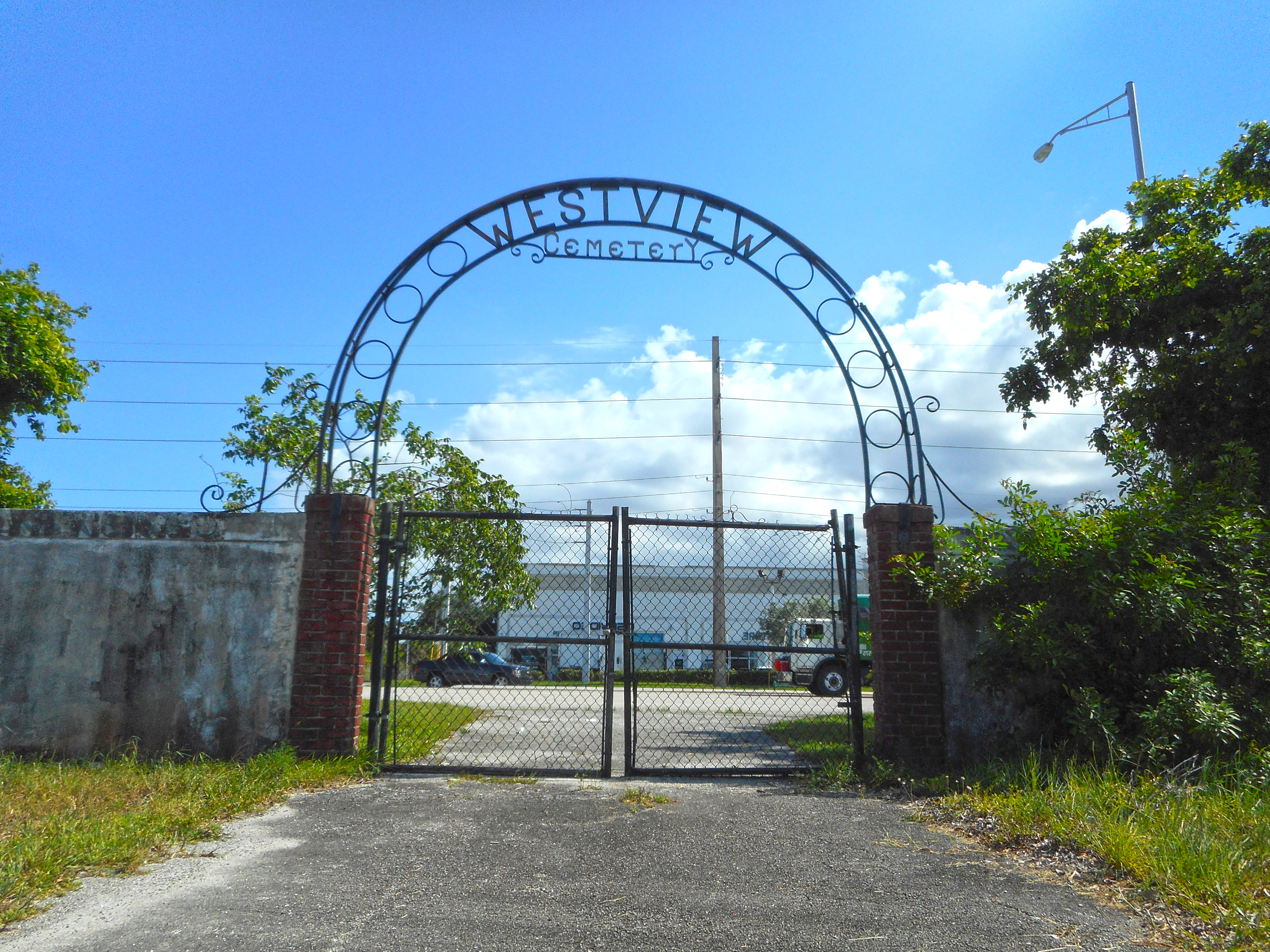
- Entrance gate viewed from inside cemetery (image is flipped horizontally for clarity)
- Interactive map of Westview Community Cemetery

Details
- Established: 1952
- Location: Dr B J McCormick Ave & NW 22 Ct, Pompano Beach, FL
- Country: US
- Coordinates: 26.2598°N 80.1479°W
- Style: Above ground vaults
- Find a Grave: Westview Community Cemetery

Westview Community Cemetery is a historic black American cemetery in Pompano Beach, Florida.

It was created in 1952 during segregation when black Americans could not be buried together with whites in Florida. the land for the cemetery was donated by Paul Hunter, Sr., a local businessman, to accommodate the interment of black Americans in Pompano Beach.

It is the final resting place of Esther Rolle (1920–1998), an actress famous for the 1970s sitcom Good Times, and two of her sisters, actresses Estelle Evans (1906–1985) and Rosanna Carter (1918–2016).

The board managing the cemetery sold four unused acres contiguous with the cemetery for $1.4 million to a commercial real estate developer in 2023. Walter Hunter, the board's president, said that the money from the sale will be used to improve the cemetery's condition.

== Legal controversy ==
As of June 2026, there are two boards battling for control of the cemetery. The cemetery is currently run by a nonprofit board of four trustees. A residents group, called the "New Westview Community Cemetery Board," has contended that the existing board currently in control of the graveyard, did not follow its own bylaws which required the board to keep community members informed about the sale of an undeveloped portion of the cemetery. In 2024, a jury confirmed that the board's bylaws were "rightful," however, it also found that the existing board was not the cemetery's "duly elected and rightful" governing body.

Local residents state the condition of the cemetery as "terrible." Most graves are without markers of any kind or without raised tombstones, and there is no fencing alongside the perimeter of the property that borders a main road.

Because of the poor state of the cemetery, some local residents believe that the land sold for development may have the buries remains of local African-American whose graves were unmarked. The developers contend that a ground penetrating radar survey has confirmed that there are no human remains buried in the newly privatized land but the New Westview Community Cemetery Board holds that the survey was inadequate.

== Gallery ==
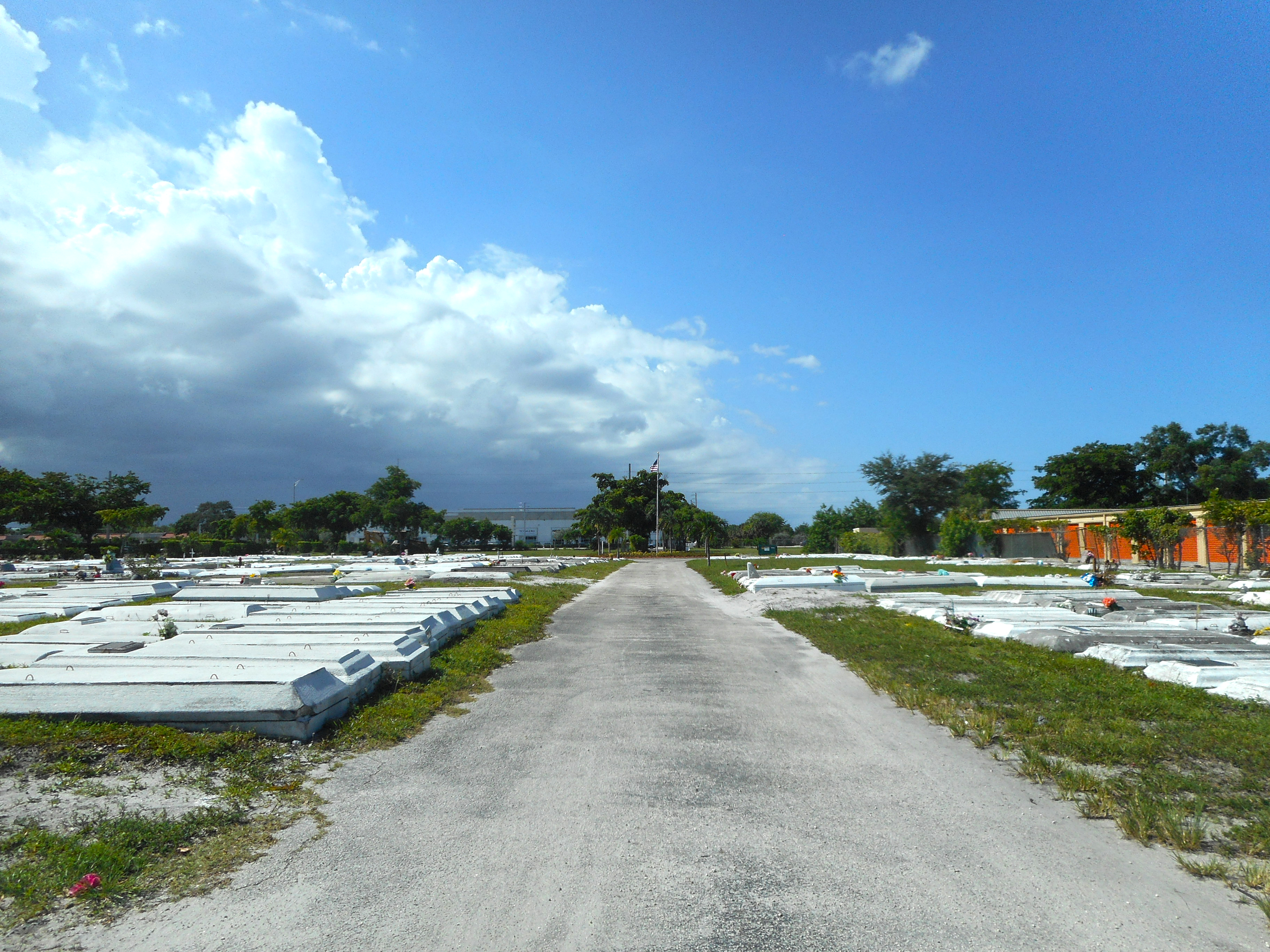

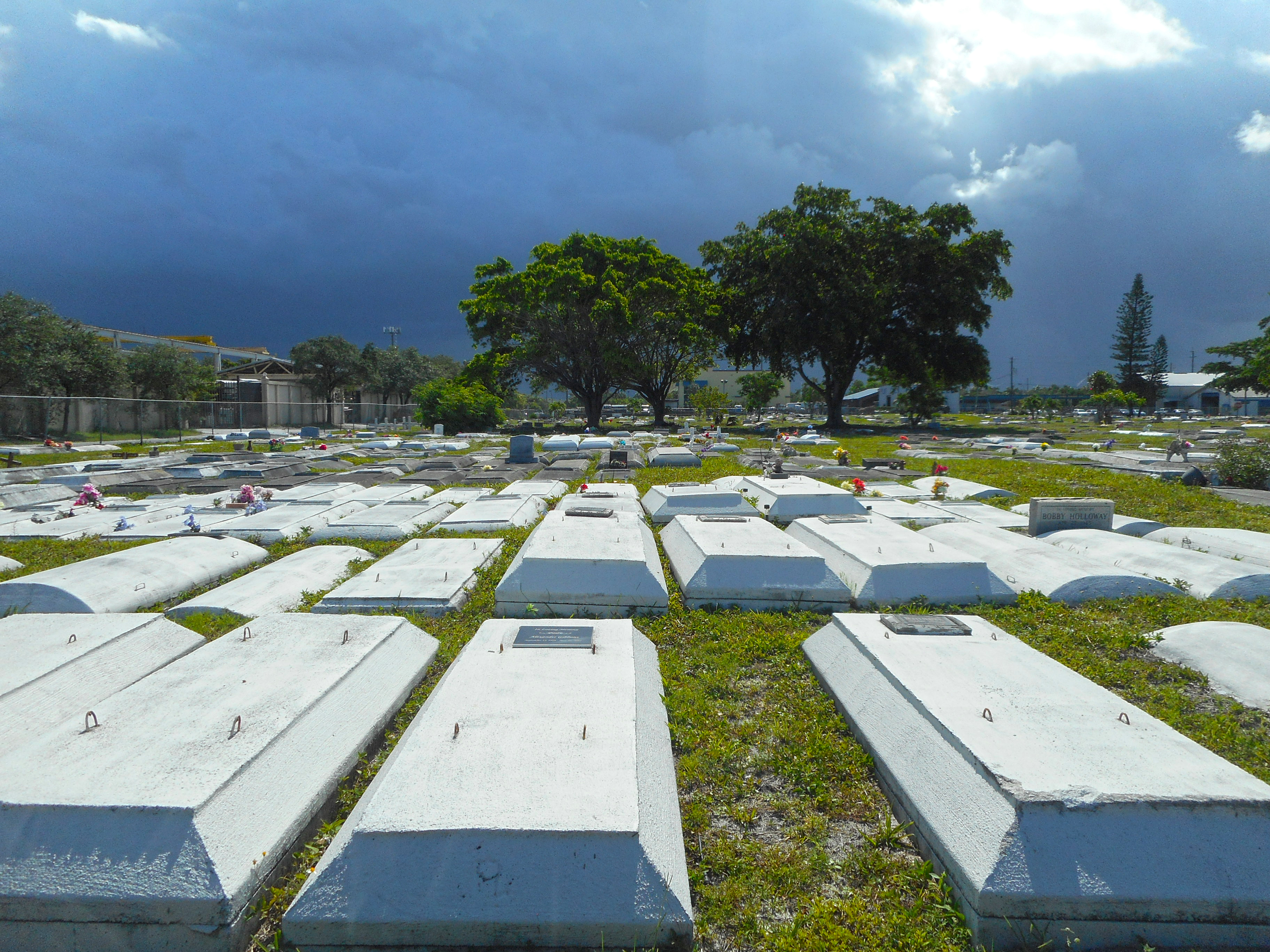

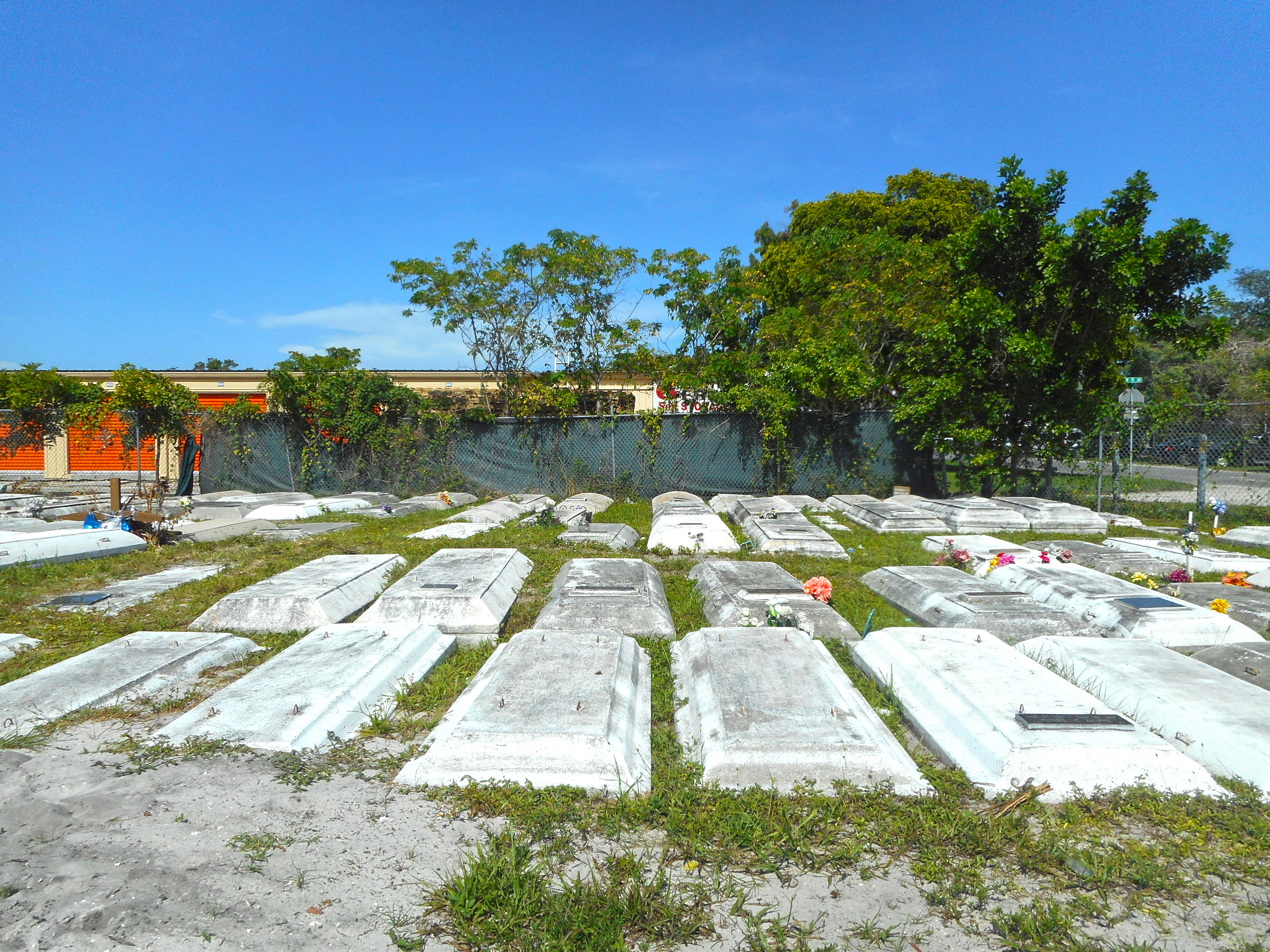

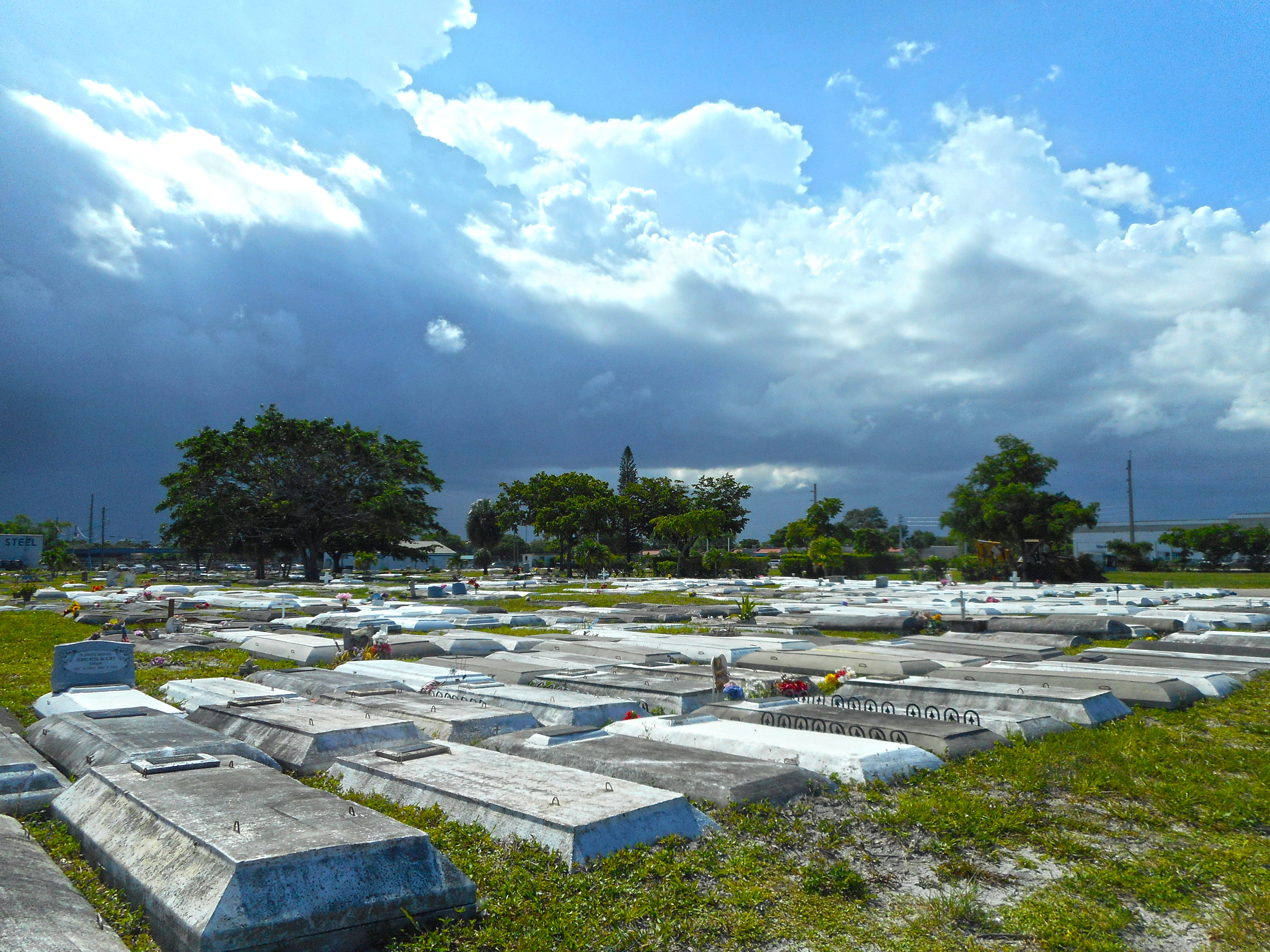

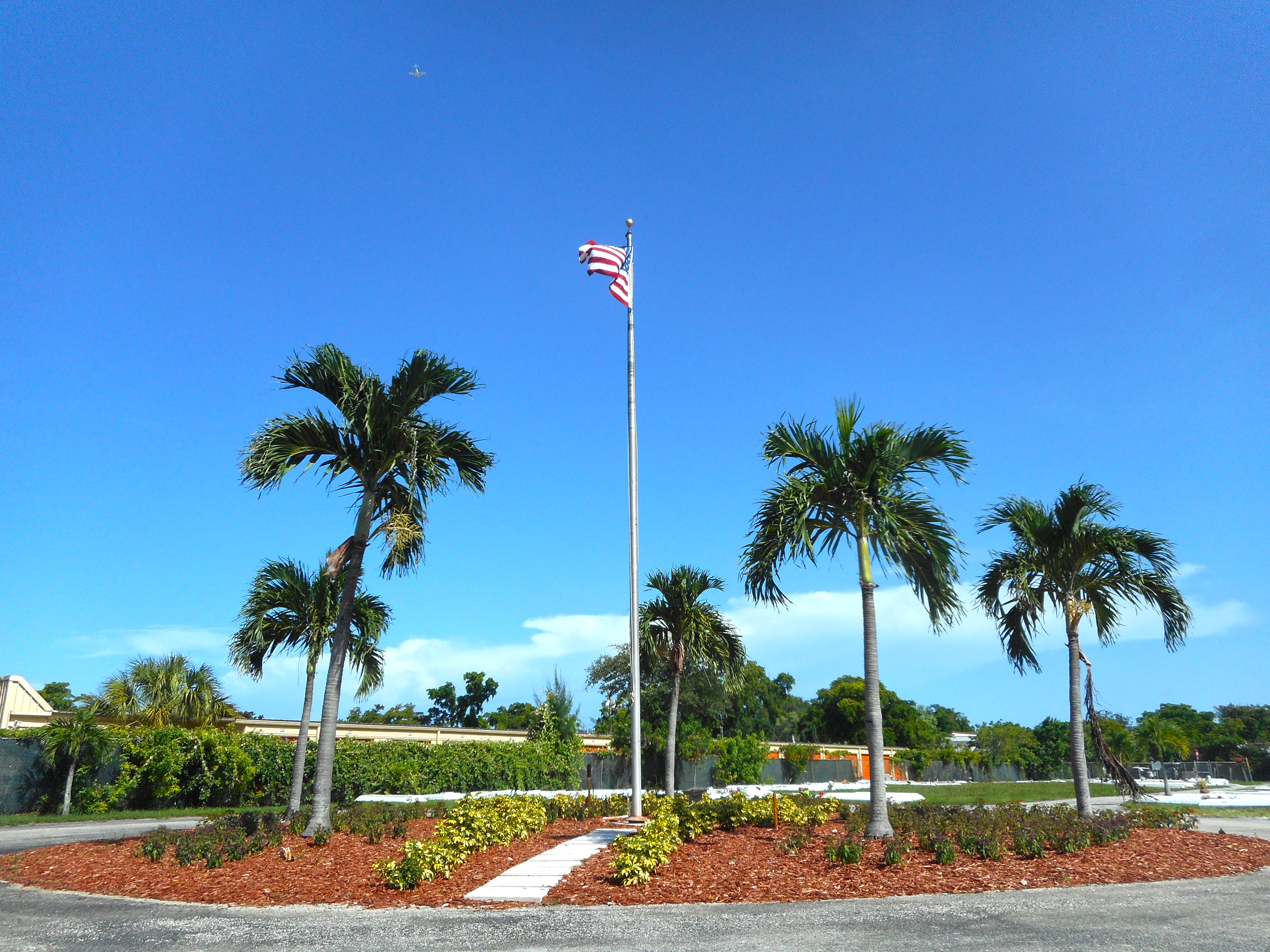

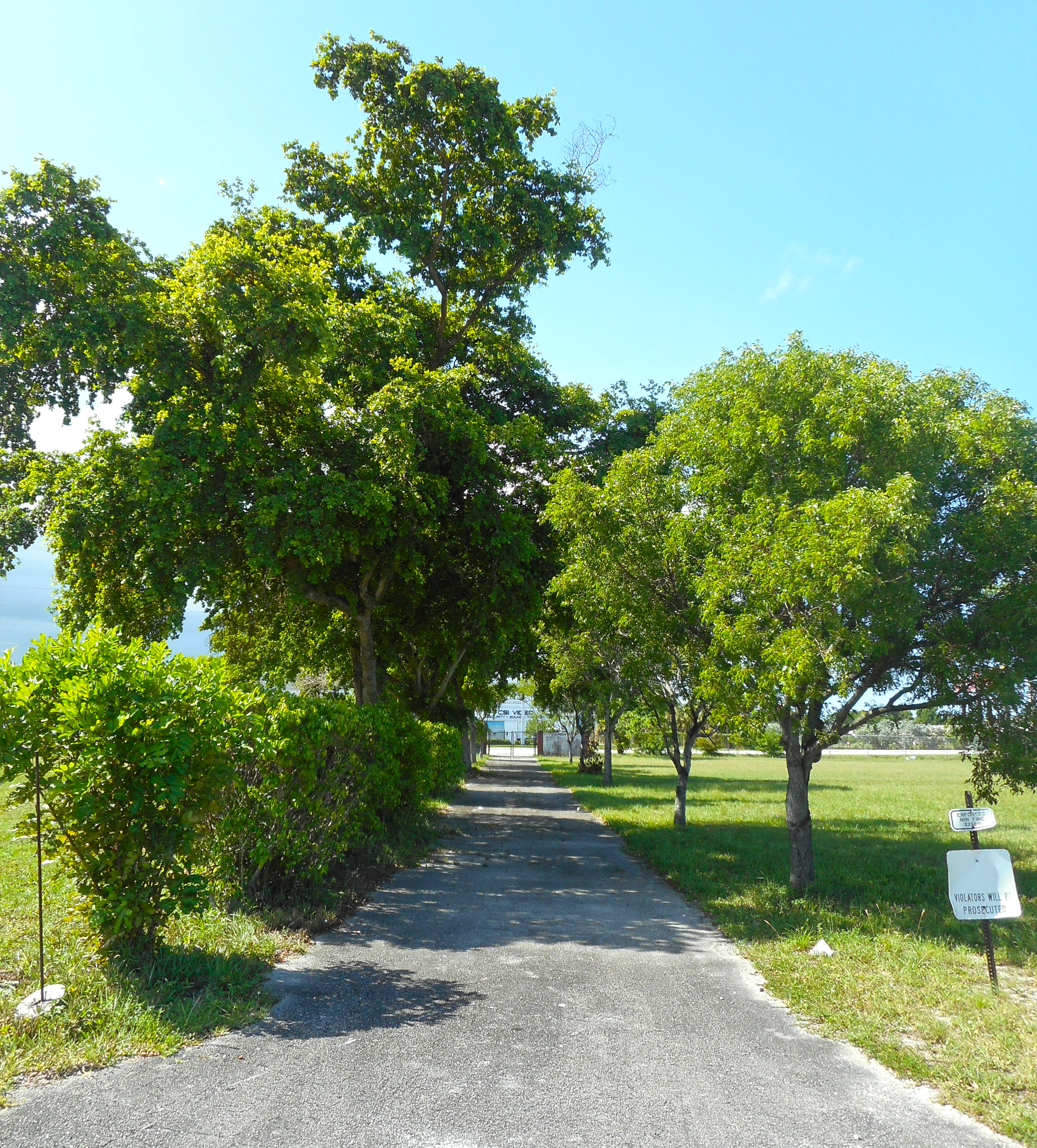

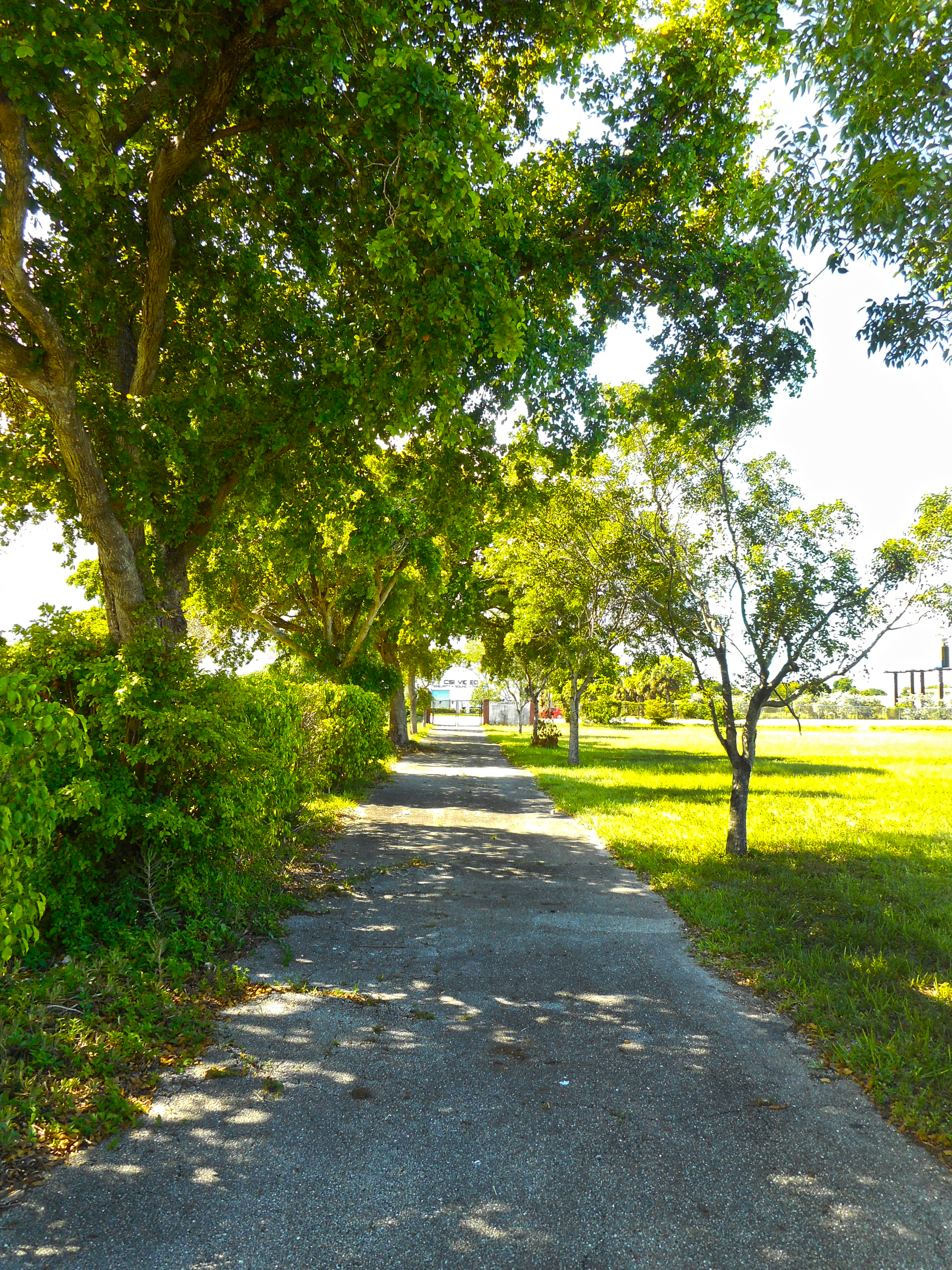

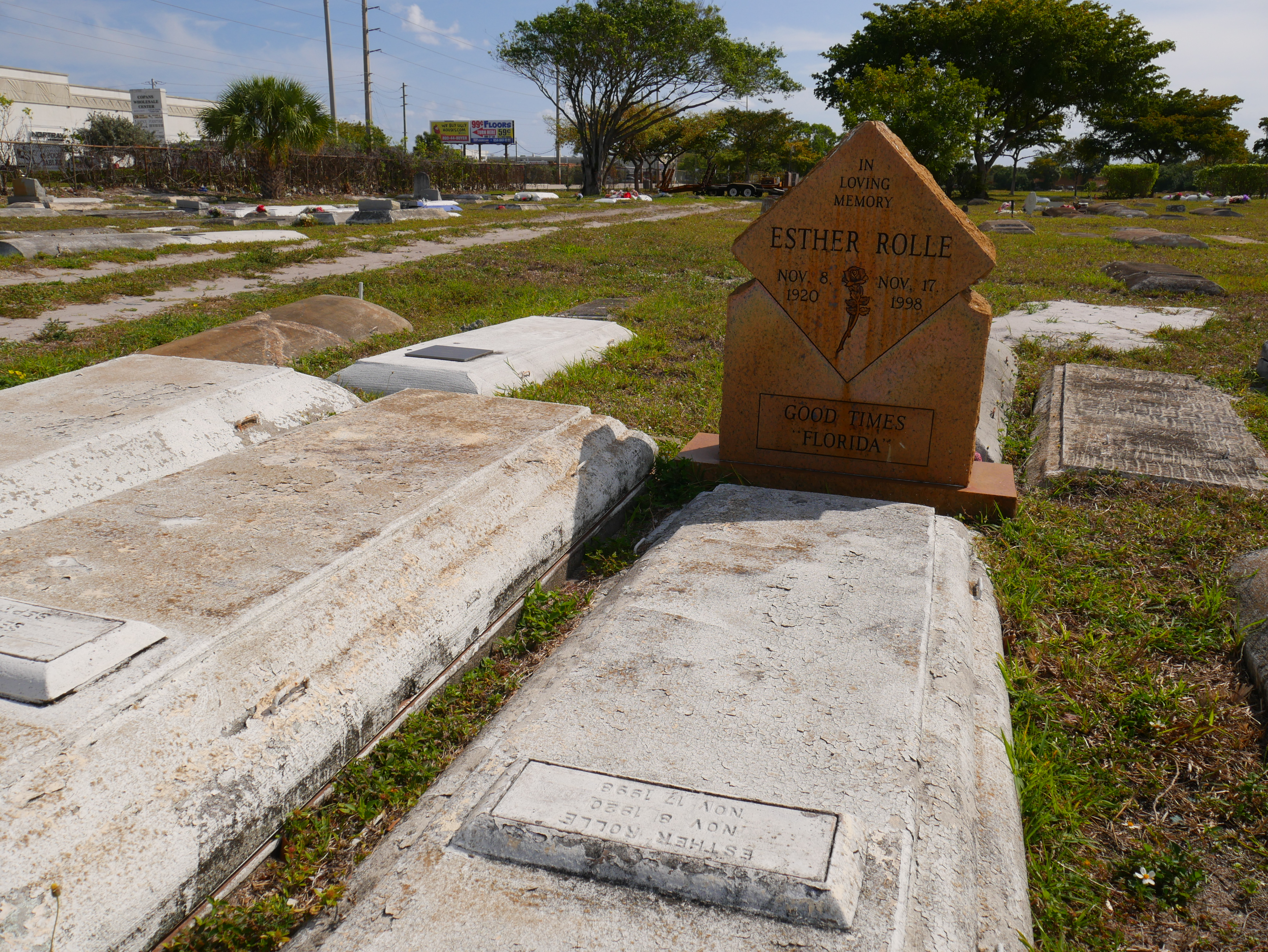
