= Kyle Johnson (actor) =

American actor (born 1951)

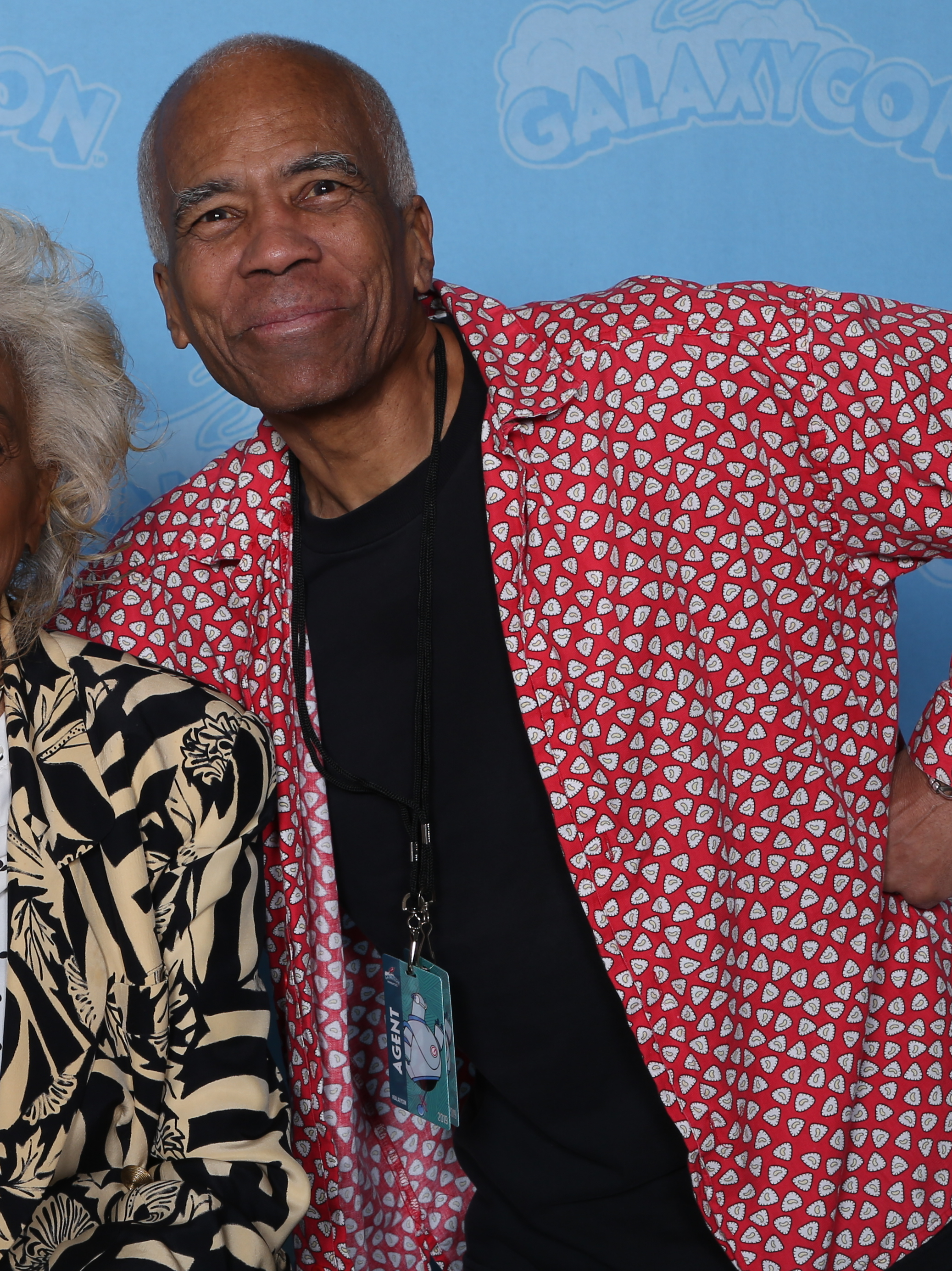
Kyle Johnson in 2019

Kyle Johnson (born August 14, 1951) is an American actor, popular for his performance in the 1969 film The Learning Tree.

He is the son of actress Nichelle Nichols and her husband Foster Johnson. His parents divorced the year he was born. Johnson began his acting career when he accompanied his mother, as a form of punishment, to an audition for a stage play. The director saw Johnson and cast him on the spot for the production.

Johnson's TV appearances include such shows as The Fugitive and The Mod Squad. His early film roles include the 1965 epic film The Greatest Story Ever Told, in which he was cast as the son of Simon of Cyrene (who was portrayed by Sidney Poitier). Later films included Roger Vadim's Pretty Maids All in a Row (1971) and Brother on the Run (1973).

Johnson was active in the Los Angeles music scene of the 1980s as a musician and songwriter. His song, "Ready To Receive" was recorded by independent folk and pop artist Claudia Russell.

In the early 2000s, Johnson had a radio show in KNFT in Silver City, New Mexico, which was the only left of center show on the station which also featured shows by Rush Limbaugh and other conservatives. The show was pulled from the air after just two months, reportedly due to pressure from local ranchers who objected to its content.
