= The Brother from Another Planet =

1984 film by John Sayles

- Theatrical release poster
- Directed by: John Sayles
- Written by: John Sayles
- Produced by: Peggy Rajski; Maggie Renzi
- Starring: Joe Morton; Darryl Edwards; Steve James; Bill Cobbs; David Strathairn
- Cinematography: Ernest R. Dickerson
- Edited by: John Sayles
- Music by: Mason Daring; John Sayles; Denzil Botus
- Distributed by: Cinecom Pictures
- Release date: September 7, 1984 (United States)
- Running time: 108 minutes
- Country: United States
- Language: English
- Budget: $350,000
- Box office: over $4 million

The Brother from Another Planet is a 1984 low-budget American science fiction film written and directed by John Sayles.

The film stars Joe Morton as an escaped extraterrestrial slave trying to find a new life on Earth. Due to an error in proper copyright protocols, the film became part of the public domain during its original release.

The film was a moderate financial success, critical reviews were largely positive and it became a cult film. Morton's performance as The Brother was acclaimed, as he had no lines of dialogue and had to communicate entirely through facial expressions and body language which earned comparisons to silent films.

== Plot ==
A mute space alien crash-lands his ship on Ellis Island. Other than his three-toed feet, which he keeps covered, he resembles a human. Because of his torn clothing, he is also viewed as a destitute person. His extraterrestrial powers are shown in many encounters; when he lays his hand on a wall, he can hear the voices of those who once filled a building – he cannot speak but he can listen with terror and sympathy. Misunderstanding the transactions in a mom-and-pop shop, he begins eating a pear (he is a vegetarian); when the shopkeeper begins screaming at him in Korean, he magically opens the cash register and hands her money from it, but this leads her to shout for the police. When pursued by a police officer down the street, he leaps to a high perch on the wall and the officer cannot find him.

He manages to blend in with the people he encounters and engages in one-sided conversations with various denizens of New York City. In a memorable scene, he meets a card trickster (Fisher Stevens) on a train who accepts his silence and hesitance to select a card; the trickster narrates a fast funny story involving the face cards, then departs, showing the Brother that some New Yorkers are simply amicable and amusing without wanting anything in return.

The Brother wanders into Odell's local bar in Harlem, where he becomes friends with Odell (Steve James) and the regulars, Walter (Bill Cobbs), Smokey (Leonard Jackson), and Fly (Daryl Edwards). Able to heal wounds and fix machines by touching them, he repairs an arcade cabinet and its video game, to the delight of Fly. Sam (Tom Wright), a social worker, secures him housing as a boarder with single mom Randy Sue Carter (Caroline Aaron) and her son, Little Earl (Herb Newsome). Later, he gets the Brother a job as a handyman and technician at a video arcade. When he fixes a game to make it fast enough to satisfy young gamer Ace's desire for speed, the Brother smiles for the first time.

One day, two men in black (John Sayles and David Strathairn) enter Odell's bar with the Brother's picture and ask for his whereabouts. Smokey lets slip that they know the Brother but when Odell demands to see the men's police badges, they leave. A little later, two white sociology students come into the bar, where they sit beside the Brother and become drunkenly proud that they are communicating with the black race. Odell tells the Brother about the men in black; panicking, the Brother leaves at once and the next day he is out cleaning windshields rather than fixing video games.

The Brother sees flyers for beautiful singer Malverne Davis at a nightclub but cannot afford the cover charge. As he walks away, he finds two kids overdosed with needles in their arms. He tries the needle himself, and spends the rest of the night feeling high and ill. The next morning, he sees graffiti in a script that he recognizes as that used by refugees like him; excited, he uses his own blood to add to it. Later, he fixes all the dead appliances in a used good shop for cash, then brings Little Earl to a museum where there is a Harriet Tubman exhibition. He signs to the boy that he is a slave escaping from another planet.

Having seen drug abuse and its tragic effects, he reveals another power. He temporarily removes one of his eyes, leaves it on the stoop of the dealer's brownstone and uses it as a video camera. The two men in black, determined to recapture him, find him again at Odell's bar. In a showdown, the locals protect him and facilitate his escape.

He later finds the business executive supplying the drug dealers in Harlem and makes him watch through the eye to see the havoc that drug abuse wreaks on families and neighborhoods. The two men in black capture the Brother with an electronic device while he is leaving the executive's office. When hope seems lost and his captors are leading him away, the Brother reads street graffiti that was written by other escapees; he breaks away from the electronic hold and runs into an alley, where a crowd of his fellow aliens are waiting to defend him. The two men in black self destruct after seeing that they are outnumbered. The Brother points to the sky as if to say, "Are we going now?", to which one of the escapees gives a thumb down answer.

== Cast ==
- Joe Morton as The Brother
- Rosanna Carter as West Indian Woman
- Ray Ramirez as Hispanic Man
- Yves Rene as Haitian Man
- Peter Richardson as Islamic Man
- Ginny Yang as Korean Shopkeeper
- Daryl Edwards as Fly
- Steve James as Odell
- Leonard Jackson as Smokey
- Bill Cobbs as Walter
- Maggie Renzi as Noreen
- Olga Merediz as Noreen's Client
- Tom Wright as Sam
- Minnie Gentry as Mrs. Brown
- Ren Woods as Bernice
- Reggie Rock Bythewood as Rickey
- Alvin Alexis as Willis
- Caroline Aaron as Randy Sue
- Herb Newsome as Little Earl
- John Sayles and David Strathairn as Men In Black
- Rosetta LeNoire as Mama
- Michael Mantell as Mr. Love
- Jamie Tirelli as Hector
- Liane Curtis as Ace
- Fisher Stevens as Card Trickster
- Chip Mitchell as Ed
- David Babcock as Phil
- Randy Frazier as Bouncer
- Dee Dee Bridgewater as Malverne
- Sidney Sheriff Jr. as Virgil
- Ishmael Houston-Jones as Dancer
- Carl Gordon as Mr. Price
- Josh Mostel as Casio Vendor
- John Canada Terrell as Baby Grand Patron (uncredited)
- Giancarlo Esposito as Man Being Arrested (uncredited)

== Production ==
=== Writing ===
The premise for the film came about from a series of dreams Sayles had while making the film Lianna: the first involving alien car salesmen called Assholes from Outer Space, the second a film noir take on Bigfoot, and the third about an extraterrestrial who looks like a black man in Harlem, an idea which Sayles loved. Cherry-picking elements from the other two dreams, he wrote the first draft of the screenplay in a little under a week.

According to a Daily Variety (July 10, 1984) article, Sayles wrote it while waiting to secure funding for Matewan (1987), and decided to go ahead first with The Brother.

=== Financing ===
Sayles spent part of his MacArthur Fellows "genius" grant on the film, which cost $350,000 to produce.

Sayles also invested his own money acquired from cable sales of Return of the Secaucus 7, as well as writing fees for his work adapting The Clan of the Cave Bear and its sequel, The Valley of Horses.

=== Locations ===
The film was shot on location chiefly in Harlem, chiefly at night, with a predominantly black cast and crew, during four weeks in March 1984.

Locations include:

- Ellis Island, where the Brother first crash-lands in New York in the night darkness.
- On the Hudson River near Lower Manhattan, where the Brother looks around in daylight and wonders which way to go.
- At an underpass at West 125th Street and 12th Avenue.
- At a skyrise building, 140 Broadway and Liberty Street, where the Brother confronts a drug dealer.

=== Visual effects and design ===
Director of photography Ernest R. Dickerson told an interviewer in American Cinematographer that he shot with "high contrasts, keeping the color bright and saturated, yet still using natural colors." In order to emphasize the humanity of the characters, Dickerson said he strove for subtlety over the "razzle-dazzle" typical of science fiction movies. Jessica Ritchey of the website RogerEbert.com wrote of the result, "The film is beautiful to look at too, shot in the warm golds and purples of twilight in New York City. Sayles and cinematographer Ernest R. Dickerson take advantage of that certain slant of light that can turn a city space from inviting to sinister in a moment. And the scrappiness of the film's few fantastical props and effects are a nod to Sayles' B-movie roots for New World Pictures, something current sci-fi films could do well to remember."

Anjuli M. Singh of the American Film Institute reports, "In order to emphasize the humanity of the characters, Dickerson said he strove for subtlety over the 'razzle-dazzle' typically seen in science fiction films. Given the film's low budget and Sayles's focus on characters over science fiction elements, few special effects were attempted. For a scene at the Baby Grand nightclub in which the filmmakers needed a smoky atmosphere but could not afford a smoke machine, gaffers smoked cigarettes and blew smoke behind Malverne, the singer (Dee Dee Bridgewater). As filming permits for the subway were difficult to attain, the card trick scene that takes place in a moving subway car was filmed in an out-of-service car on display in a subway museum. The second-to-last scene of the film, in which The Brother looks out the window of a moving subway car, was shot illicitly with a hidden camera inside a working subway car, since the crew had not obtained permission to shoot there."

== Themes ==
Director John Sayles has described The Brother from Another Planet as being about the immigrant experience of cultural assimilation. Extras from the film described it as "The Black E.T. movie."

Two aliens who resemble white men hunt for the Brother to return him to their planet. They consider the Brother an inferior race not because of his skin color, but because he has three toes.

== Reception and legacy ==
On review aggregator website Rotten Tomatoes, the film holds an approval rating of 89% based on 28 critical reviews, with an average rating of 7.1/10. The site's critical consensus reads, "Featuring director John Sayles' trademark humanity and an expressive performance from Joe Morton, The Brother from Another Planet is an observant, dryly comic sci-fi gem."

Variety called The Brother from Another Planet a "vastly amusing but progressively erratic" film structured as a "series of behavioral vignettes, [many of which] are genuinely delightful and inventive"; as it continues, the film "takes a rather unpleasant and, ultimately, confusing turn." Vincent Canby called it a "nice, unsurprising shaggy-dog story that goes on far too long" but singled out "Joe Morton's sweet, wise, unaggressive performance." Roger Ebert gave the film 3.5 stars out of 4, saying "the movie finds countless opportunities for humorous scenes, most of them with a quiet little bite, a way of causing us to look at our society", noting that "by using a central character who cannot talk, [Sayles] is sometimes able to explore the kinds of scenes that haven't been possible since the death of silent film."

The A.V. Club, in a 2003 review of the film's DVD release, said the film's superhero scenes are "often unintentionally silly, but again, Sayles shapes a catchy premise into a subtler piece, using Morton's 'alien' status as a way of asking who deserves to be called an outsider in a country born of outsiders"; commenting on the DVD, they noted its "marvelous" audio commentary track by Sayles, "who moves fluidly from behind-the-scenes anecdotes to useful technical tips to unpretentious dissections of his own themes."

Paul Attanasio wrote: "Sayles is no storyteller; despite the verve of its language, The Brother From Another Planet eventually sags of its own weight. And all his movies are hampered by an almost shocking ignorance of filmmaking fundamentals – he just doesn't know where to put his camera. The movie would have benefited from more attention to the bounty hunters, whose difficulties with Harlem culture would have balanced the Brother's strange ease of assimilation. Instead, the plot takes a centrifugal turn as the Brother roots out a scag baron whose drugs are poisoning the community."

The film has become a cult classic.

== Accolades ==
Sundance Film Festival - Special Jury Recognition (1985)

== See also ==
- List of Afrofuturist films
- Starman - the Oscar-nominated John Carpenter film also released in the same year and similar in content
