= Rosanna Carter =

American actress (1918–2016)

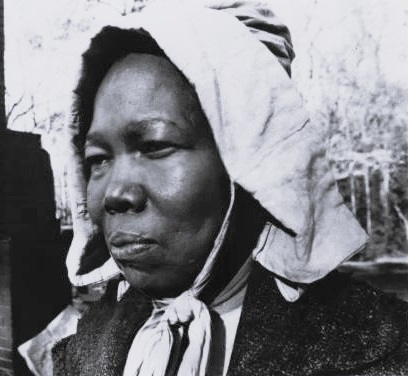
- Carter in Tales of the Unknown South (1984)
- Born: Rosanna Rolle; September 20, 1918; Nassau, Bahamas
- Died: December 30, 2016 (aged 98); Pompano Beach, Florida, US
- Occupation: Actress
- Years active: 1974–1997
- Television: Good Times; Tales from the Darkside; Law & Order; The Cosby Show
- Spouse: John Carter
- Relatives: Estelle Evans; Esther Rolle (sisters)
- Awards: 1977 - AUDELCO Award Best Supporting Actress in a Play - (Unfinished Women)

Rosanna Rolle Carter (September 20, 1918 – December 30, 2016) was a Bahamian American television, stage and film actress. During the Harlem Renaissance, she acted at New Lafayette Theater as one of the Lafayette Players. She acted in The Brother from Another Planet, a well-reviewed 1984 film described by its director as a science fiction allegory of immigration. She was the sister of Esther Rolle and Estelle Evans.

== Early life and education ==
Rosanna Rolle was born on September 20, 1918 in Nassau, Bahamas, to Bahamian parents, Jonathan and Elizabeth (née Dames) Rolle. Her father moved to Florida to work for the railway; the family followed in 1920. Rolle grew up in Pompano Beach, Florida.

Rolle was one of 18 children. She was the older sister of actress Esther Rolle and the younger sister of actress Estelle Evans.

== Career ==
In the 1970s, Carter was a member of the Negro Ensemble Company theatrical group. Her Broadway credits include Inacent Black (1980), The American Clock (1980), and My Sister, My Sister (1973).

In 1979, she was filming episodes of PBS's Getting to Know Me.

She starred in many movies, including Night of the Juggler (1980), and The Brother from Another Planet (1984).

Carter also guest starred on many television shows. In 1974, she made a guest appearance on her sister, Esther Rolle's sitcom Good Times as Cora. In 1985, she guest starred as Mrs. McNeill on television's Tales from the Darkside. In 1992, she guest starred as Rosanna on television's The Cosby Show. Also, she guest starred on the television show I'll Fly Away in 1993. Her last guest star appearance was on television's Law & Order in 1997 as Mrs. Hemmerick in the season eight première. She appeared on Law & Order twice before; first in 1990 as Mrs. Jackson and a small extra role in 1994 as an old woman.

== Personal life ==
In 1974, Carter was injured when a police car struck her automobile from behind, forcing it to hit a parked bus. Seven years later, a Bronx Supreme Court jury awarded her $1 million for her injuries, impairment of earning capacity, and lost wages.

== Awards ==
Carter received an AUDELCO award in 1977 for her work as a supporting actress in the play, Unfinished Women. She was nominated for an Emmy Award as Outstanding Guest Actress in a Drama Series in I'll Fly Away in 1993, losing to Elaine Stritch who performed in Law & Order.

== Filmography ==
This is a selected filmography:

- Wedding Band (1974, TV movie)
- Good Times (1974, episode: "Florida Flips"), as "Cora"
- Gettin' to Know Me (1980), as "Momma Violet"
- Night of the Juggler (1980), as "old woman"
- See China and Die (1981), as "maid", a.k.a. Momma the Detective
- The Brother from Another Planet (1984), as "West Indiaemmern Story"
- Tales of the Unknown South (1984, segment: "Ashes")
- Tales from the Darkside (1985, episode: "In the Cards"), as "Mrs. McNeill"
- A Gathering of Old Men (1987, TV movie), as "Beulah"
- She-Devil (1989), as "Judge Brown"
- Law & Order (1990–1997, 3 episodes: "Out of the Half-Light", as "Mrs. Jackson", "Snatched", as "old woman", "Thrill", as "Mrs. Hemmerick")
- Carolina Skeletons (1991, TV movie), as "Mother Bragg"
- The Cosby Show (1992, episode: "The Price is Wrong"), as "Rosanna"
- I'll Fly Away (1993, episode: "What's in a Name?"), as "Eulalia Jefferson"
- American Playhouse (1993, episode: "Hallelujah"), as "Minnie"
