= Esther Rolle =

American actress (1920–1998)

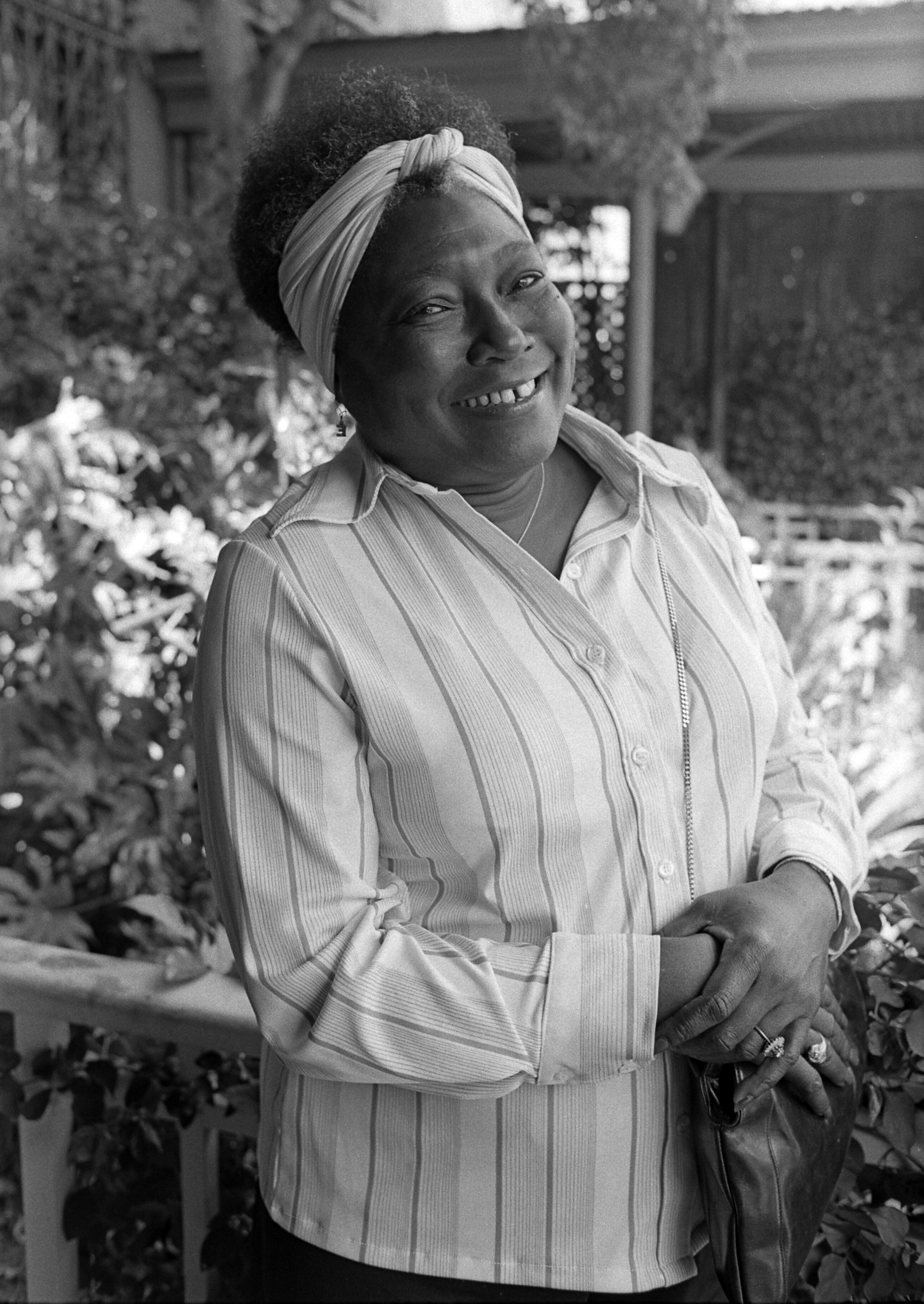
- Rolle in 1978
- Born: Esther Elizabeth Rolle; November 8, 1920; Pompano Beach, Florida, U.S.
- Died: November 17, 1998 (aged 78); Culver City, California, U.S.
- Resting place: Westview Community Cemetery, Pompano Beach, Florida
- Occupation: Actress
- Years active: 1964–1998
- Known for: Florida Evans on Maude and Good Times
- Spouse: Oscar Robinson (m. 1955; div. 1975)
- Relatives: Estelle Evans (sister); Rosanna Carter (sister)
- Awards: 1979 Primetime Emmy Award: Outstanding Supporting Actress in a Limited Series or a Special; Summer of My German Soldier

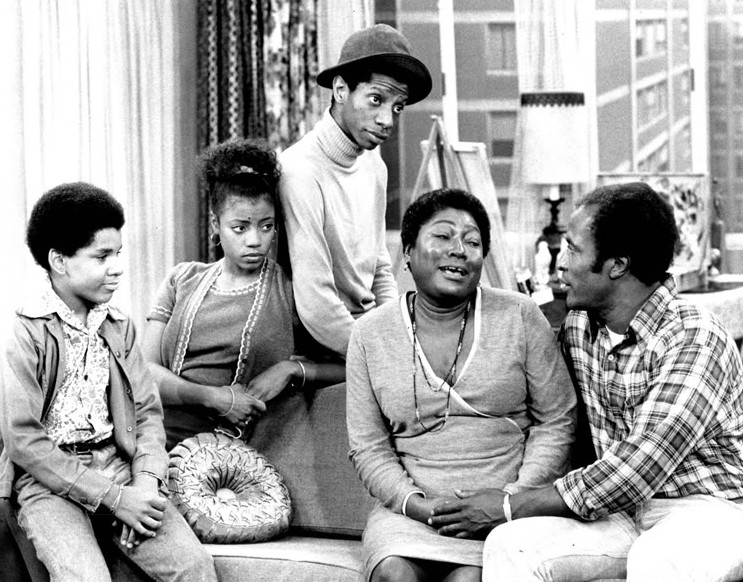
On Good Times (1974), L-R: Ralph Carter, Bern Nadette Stanis, Jimmie Walker, Esther Rolle, and John Amos

Esther Elizabeth Rolle (November 8, 1920 – November 17, 1998) was an American actress. She is best known for her role as Florida Evans, on the CBS television sitcom Maude, for two seasons (1972–1974), and its spin-off series Good Times, for which she was nominated for a Golden Globe Award for Best Actress - Television Series Musical or Comedy in 1976. In 1979, Rolle became the first Black actress to win the Emmy for Outstanding Supporting Actress in a Limited Series or Special for the television film Summer of My German Soldier. In 1990, Rolle became the first woman to earn the National Association for the Advancement of Colored People (NAACP) Chairman's Civil Rights Leadership Award.

== Early life and education ==
Esther Rolle was born on November 8, 1920, in Pompano Beach, Florida, to Bahamian immigrants Jonathan Rolle (1883–1953), a farmer, and Elizabeth Iris Rolle (née Dames; 1887–1947). Her parents were both born and raised in the Bahamas. Her father moved to Florida to work for the railway; the family followed about 1919. (Note: Rosanna was the last sibling born in the Bahamas in 1918; Esther was the first born in Pompano Beach in 1919.) Rolle was the tenth of 18 children. Her older sisters are fellow actresses Estelle Evans and Rosanna Carter.

Rolle attended Booker T. Washington High School in Miami, but transferred to Blanche Ely High School in Pompano Beach from which she graduated. She initially studied at Spelman College in Atlanta, before moving to New York City. While in New York, she attended Hunter College before transferring to The New School and then Yale University in New Haven, Connecticut.

== Career ==
For many years, Rolle worked in a traditional day job in New York City's garment district.

=== Dance and theater ===
Rolle was a member of Asadata Dafora's dance troupe, Shogolo Oloba (later renamed the Federal Theater African Dance Troupe). She became the troupe's director in 1960. Rolle's earliest roles were on the stage; her New York stage debut was in the 1962 play The Blacks. She was often cast in plays produced by Robert Hooks and the Negro Ensemble Company. She also appeared in productions of The Crucible and Blues for Mr. Charlie. Rolle's most prominent early role was as Miss Maybell in the Melvin Van Peebles 1972 Broadway musical Don't Play Us Cheap, and its subsequent 1973 film adaptation. (Note: Reprinted as Esther Rolle's Obituary From CNN at sitcomsonline.com) In 1977, Rolle portrayed Lady Macbeth in Orson Welles' Haitian-influenced version of William Shakespeare's Macbeth at the Henry Street New Federal Theater in Manhattan.

=== Television ===
Rolle is best known for her television role as Florida Evans, the character she played on two 1970s sitcoms. The character was introduced as Maude Findlay's housekeeper on Maude, and was spun off in the show's second season into Good Times, a show about Florida's family, although the character she played on Good Times was technically not the same character she had played on Maude despite the similarities. Rolle was nominated in 1975 for the Golden Globe Award for Best Actress - Television Series Musical or Comedy for her role in Good Times. Rolle was 19 years older than the actor (John Amos) who played her husband James (named Henry on Maude) Evans. The James Evans character was only added after Rolle fought hard for a father figure and husband to be added to the show. Rolle had fought for the father character on the show and more relevant themes and scripts, and was unhappy with the success of Jimmie Walker's character, J.J. Evans, which she believed took the show in a frivolous direction. John Amos agreed with Rolle about Walker's character and was fired from the show after the third season ended. Later on, in a stand-off with Good Times producer Norman Lear, Rolle also quit when her contract ended. Although the show continued without her for the fifth season, she returned for the show's final season. In 1979 she won an Emmy for her role in Summer of My German Soldier, a made-for-television movie.

Among her guest-starring roles was one on The Incredible Hulk in an episode entitled "Behind the Wheel", in which she played a taxicab business owner. In the 1990s, Rolle was a surprise guest on RuPaul's VH-1 talk show. Her Maude co-star Bea Arthur was the guest, and Rolle was brought out to surprise Arthur. The two had not seen each other in years, Arthur said, and embraced warmly. Rolle also appeared in a series of psychic hotline TV commercials in the 1990s. "Tell them Esther sent you," was her trademark line.

=== Music and film ===
Rolle released an album of music titled The Garden of My Mind in 1975. Rolle's first screen appearance is a small, uncredited role in To Kill a Mockingbird (1962), and she later appeared in Gordon Parks' The Learning Tree (1969). Her sister, actress Estelle Evans, appeared in both films as well. Esther Rolle appeared early in her career in the film Nothing But a Man (1964). After Good Times ended, she appeared in a number of made-for-television movies as well as films, including Driving Miss Daisy and My Fellow Americans. A memorable role was that of Aunt Sarah in the film Rosewood (1997). She had a major role in I Know Why the Caged Bird Sings based on Maya Angelou's memoir of the same name, and has the distinction of having won the first Emmy Award for the category Outstanding Supporting Actress in a Miniseries or Movie, in 1979, for her work in the television movie Summer of My German Soldier. She is also credited for her role in the film The Mighty Quinn (1989), starring Denzel Washington and Sheryl Lee Ralph, and featuring Robert Townsend. Her last film, Train Ride, was released in 2000 despite being filmed in 1998; her final film released during her lifetime was Maya Angelou's Down in the Delta, with Alfre Woodard and Al Freeman, Jr.

== Personal life ==
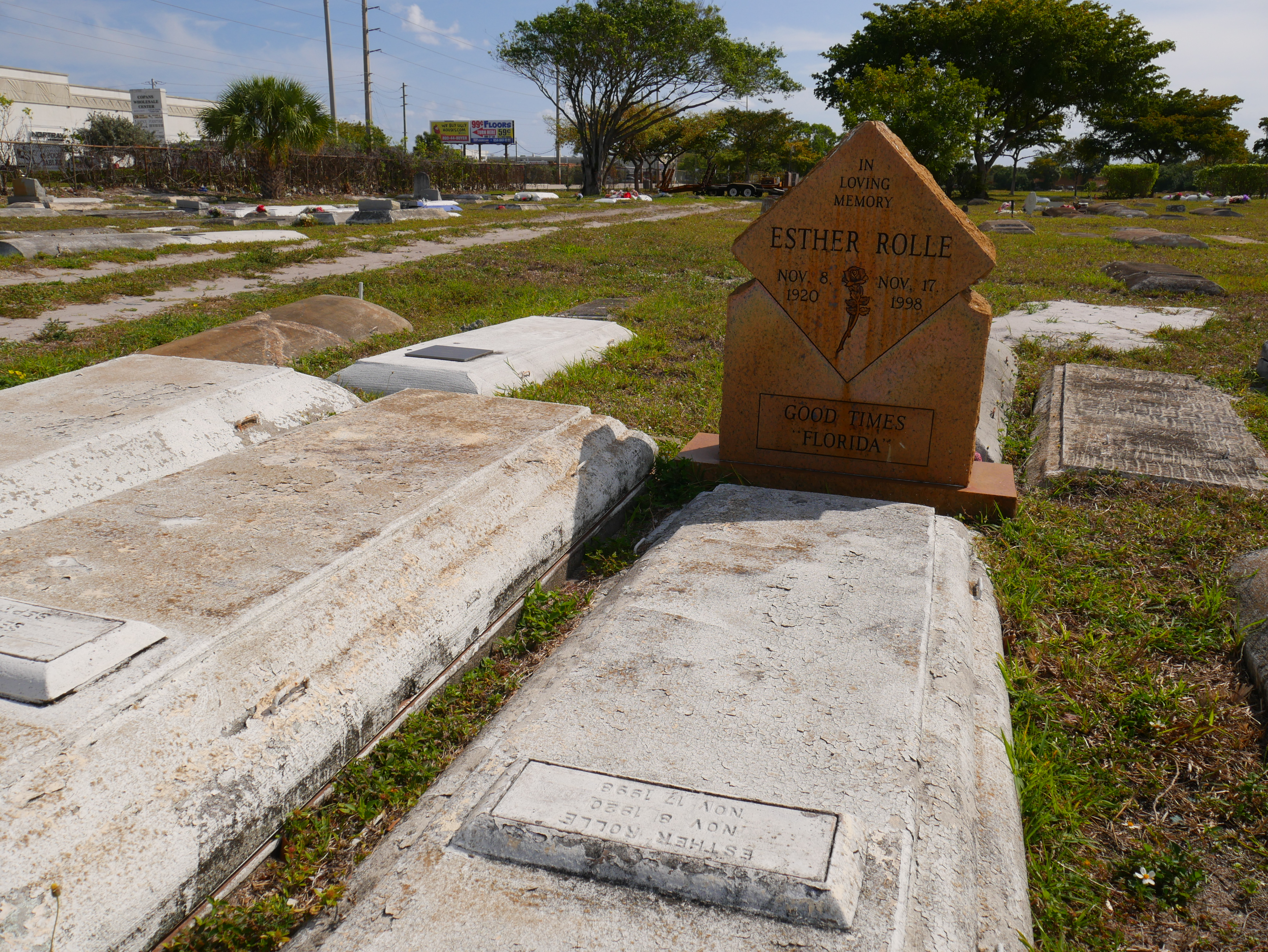
Rolle's gravesite and headstone

Rolle was married to Oscar Robinson from 1955 until their divorce in 1975. She had no children, but did have one ex-stepdaughter, Sherley Mae Robinson (born 1936), from Oscar's previous marriage.

== Death ==
Rolle died on November 17, 1998, in Culver City, California, from complications of diabetes, at the age of 78. A devout member of the African Methodist Episcopal Church, Rolle requested that her funeral be held at Bethel African Methodist Episcopal Church in her hometown of Pompano Beach, Florida.

She is buried in Westview Community Cemetery in Pompano Beach. The cemetery is a historically black burial ground created in 1952, a time when the laws and customs of Florida did not permit white people and black people to be buried in the same cemetery.

== Legacy ==
Rolle's family donated over 100 items of hers to the African-American Research Library and Cultural Center in Fort Lauderdale, Florida. The collection includes gowns, a black Raggedy Andy doll she endorsed, a recording of poems recited by Rolle, and awards such as the 1974 NAACP Eighth Image Award for Best Actress in a Series and her 1979 Emmy for her role in Summer of My German Soldier. There is a street named after Esther Rolle in her hometown of Pompano Beach, Florida.

== Filmography/television ==
Year	Title	Role	Note
1964	Nothing But a Man	Church woman	
1967	Up the Down Staircase	Teacher	Uncredited
1970–1971	One Life to Live	Sadie Gray	Unknown episodes
1971	Who Says I Can't Ride a Rainbow!		
1971	The Bold Ones: The Senator	Black Woman	Episode: "A Single Blow of a Sword"
1972–1974	Maude	Florida Evans	45 episodes
1973	Cleopatra Jones	Mrs. Johnson	
1973	Don't Play Us Cheap	Miss Maybell	
1974–1979	Good Times	Florida Evans	109 episodes Nominated–Golden Globe Award for Best Actress - Television Series Musical or Comedy
1978	Summer of My German Soldier	Ruth	TV movie Primetime Emmy Award for Outstanding Supporting Actress in a Miniseries or a Movie
1979	I Know Why the Caged Bird Sings	Momma	TV movie
1979	The Incredible Hulk	Colleen Jensen	Episode: "Behind the Wheel"
1981	Darkroom	Grandmother / Old Woman	Episode: "Needlepoint"
1981	See China and Die	Momma Sykes	TV movie
1982	Flamingo Road	Julia	3 episodes
1983	The Love Boat	Judge Kramer	Episode: "I Like To Be In America"
1983	Fantasy Island	Mama	Episode: "Edward/The Extraordinary Miss Jones"
1984	Finder of Lost Loves	Nellie	Episode: "Goodbye, Sara"
1985	Murder, She Wrote	Margaret	Episode: "Reflections of the Mind"
1986	Ethnic Notions	Narrator	Documentary about the history of racial stereotypes
1987	P.K. and the Kid	Mim	
1989	American Playhouse	Lena Younger	Episode: "A Raisin in the Sun"
1989	The Mighty Quinn	Ubu Pearl	
1989	Driving Miss Daisy	Idella	
1990	The Kid Who Loved Christmas	Mrs. Clayton, Adoption Agency Director	TV movie
1990	Singer & Sons	Sarah Patterson	4 episodes
1993	House of Cards	Adelle	
1993	To Dance with the White Dog	Neelie	TV movie
1994	Scarlett	Mammy	1 episode
1995	How to Make an American Quilt	Aunt Pauline	
1996	My Fellow Americans	Rita	
1996	General Hospital	Mourner	Unknown episodes
1997	Rosewood	Aunt Sarah	Nominated–Image Award for Outstanding Supporting Actress in a Motion Picture
1997	Touched by an Angel	Mary Harding	Episode: "Amazing Grace: Part 1"
1998	Poltergeist: The Legacy	Grandma Rose	Episode: "La Belle Dame Sans Merci"
1998	Down in the Delta	Annie Sinclair	
2000	Train Ride	Dean of Students	Released posthumously, (final film role)

== Stage work ==
- Day of Absence (1965)
- Happy Ending (1965)
- The Amen Corner (1965)
- Man Better Man (1969)
- Akokawe (1970)
- Ride a Black Horse (1971)
- The Dream on Monkey Mountain (1971)
- Rosalee Pritchett (1971)
- Don't Play Us Cheap (1972)
- A Ballet Behind the Bridge (1972)
- Horowitz and Mrs. Washington (1980)
- Nevis Mountain Dew (1980)
- Dame Lorraine (1981)
- A Tragedy of Romeo and Juliet (1982)
- A Raisin in the Sun (1989)
- Member of the Wedding (1989)

== Bibliography ==
- Brooks, Tim; Marsh, Earle F. (2003). The Complete Directory to Prime Time Network and Cable TV Shows, 1946-Present. New York City: Ballantine Books. p. 1431. ISBN 978-0345455420.
