= Donald Hopkins =

American physician (born 1941)

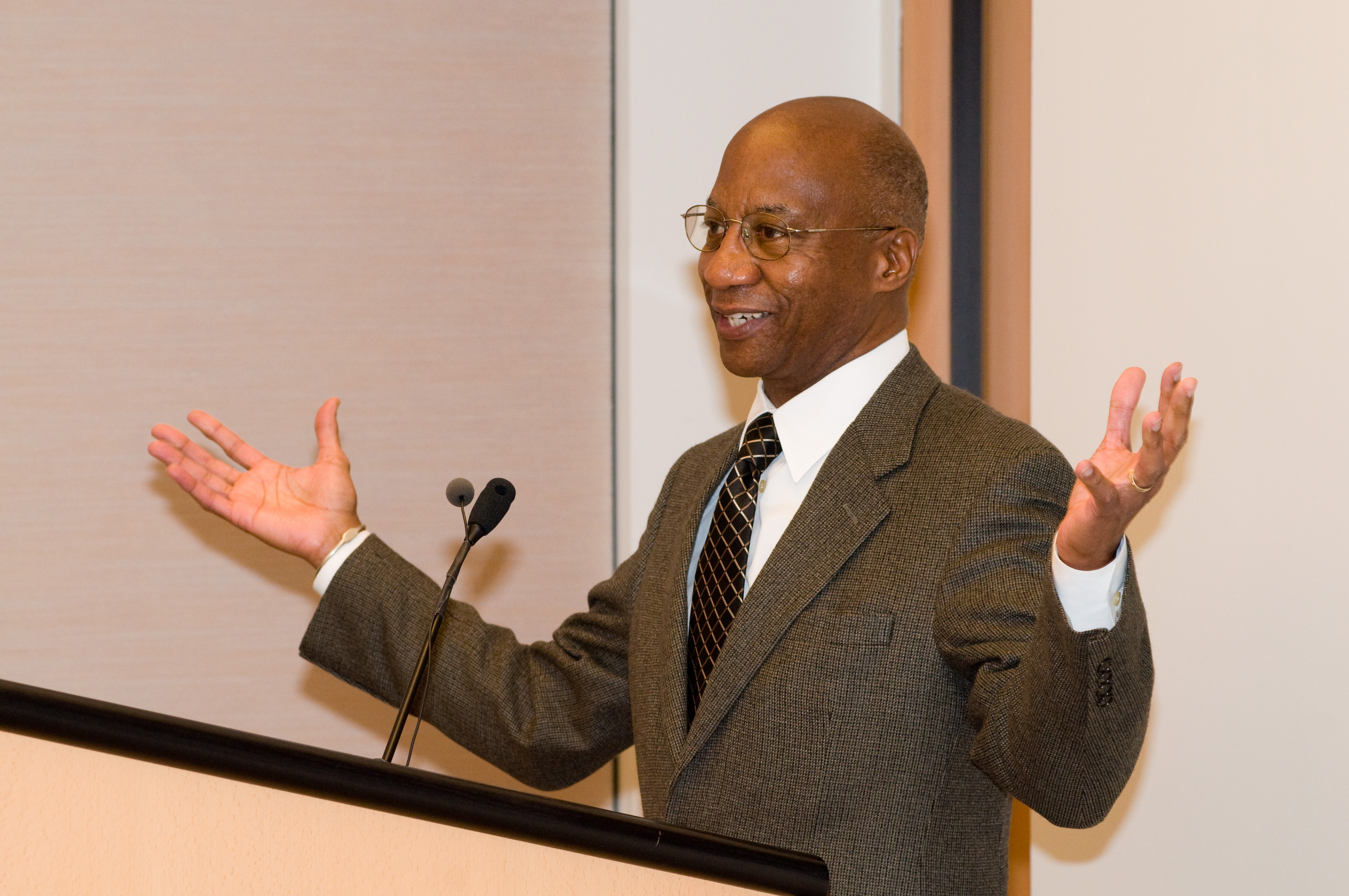
- Hopkins speaking at the Center for Neighborhood Technology's MacArthur Foundation Award ceremony in 2009
- Born: September 25, 1941 (age 83); Miami, Florida, U.S.
- Education: Morehouse College (BS); University of Chicago (MD); Harvard University (MPH)
- Known for: Neglected tropical disease eradication
- Spouse: Ernestine Mathis (m. 1967)
- Awards: MacArthur Fellowship (1995)
- Scientific career
- Fields: Public health Epidemiology
- Institutions: The Carter Center; Centers for Disease Control and Prevention; Harvard School of Public Health

Donald R. Hopkins (born September 25, 1941) is a Bahamian American physician, a MacArthur Fellow and is the Vice President and Director of Health Programs at The Carter Center. He graduated from Morehouse College with a B.S., from the University of Chicago with a Doctor of Medicine, and from the Harvard School of Public Health with a Master of Public Health. He studied at the Institute of European Studies, University of Vienna.

== Career ==
From 1984 to 1987, Hopkins was deputy director and acting director (1985) of the Centers for Disease Control and Prevention. Thereafter, he was an assistant professor of tropical public health at Harvard School of Public Health.

He directed the Smallpox Eradication/Measles Control Program in Sierra Leone.

He has served as a consultant to the World Health Organization.

Throughout his career, Hopkins has received numerous awards, including the CDC Medal of Excellence, the Distinguished Service Medal of the U.S. Public Health Service, and a MacArthur Fellowship in 1995 for his leadership in the international campaign to eradicate Guinea worm disease. His book, Princes and Peasants: Smallpox in History was nominated for the Pulitzer Prize in 1983.

Dr. Hopkins was also elected to the Institute of Medicine of the National Academy of Sciences in 1987 and has been a member of the American Society of Tropical Medicine and Hygiene since 1965. He was elected a Fellow of the American Academy of Arts and Sciences in 1997, awarded the Medal of Honor of Public Health (Gold) by the country of Niger in 2004, and named a Champion of Public Health by Tulane University in 2005. Hopkins currently serves on the board of directors for the MacArthur Foundation.

== Works ==
- "The Guinea Worm Eradication Effort: Lessons for the Future", Emerging Infectious Diseases, Volume 4 No. 1, January – March 1998
- The eradication of infectious diseases: report of the Dahlem Workshop on the Eradication of Infectious Diseases, Editors Walter R. Dowdle, Donald R. Hopkins, John Wiley and Sons, 1998 ISBN 978-0-471-98089-6
- The greatest killer: smallpox in history, with a new introduction, University of Chicago Press, 2002, ISBN 978-0-226-35168-1 in
