= Denzil Botus =

- Also known as: Belt
- Born: Port of Spain
- Origin: Trinidad
- Genres: Calypso, soca
- Occupation: Pannist
- Instrument: Steelpan
- Years active: 1960s-present

Denzil "Belt" Botus (born July 3, 1946) is a pannist from Trinidad. He is best known for holding the record for most winning steel band Panorama arrangements and his heavy jazz influence in calypso/soca music. Botus has been active since the 1960s and is considered one of the best steel drummers in the world.

== Life ==
"Belt" began playing with the Desperadoes Steel Orchestra in the early '60s and became one of that orchestra's top steelpan musicians. At the Champs of Champs Classical Steel Orchestra Music Festival, which was held at Queens Hall in 1967 at Trinidad, Mr. Botus' stick (mallet) fell, but like a gunfighter in the old West, he drew his spare and played his part almost to perfection. In 1969, Botus moved to New York and in 1975 co-founded "Despers USA". In the late 1970s, he moved to Boston where he formed "Real Steel". Real Steel toured North America and won the International Music Festival in 1983. Real Steel was not only the only steel band in New England to win a competition outside of New England, but the only steel band to win a music competition outside of steel band competitions. Botus also wrote and performed steel drum music on the soundtrack to The Brother from Another Planet. He moved back to Trinidad in 1985, but returned when he would achieve his biggest feat and the biggest feat in steel band in Brooklyn.

As a co-arranger for Despers USA, they won New York's Panorama 5 years in a row from 1994 through 1998. He has toured the African Continent twice. Botus retired from arranging in 2004, but came out of retirement recently to arrange for Dem Stars Steel Orchestra for New York's 2007 panorama. His daughter Debra Sarjeant has also won Boston's steel band competition six years in a row (1991–1996) and is currently the lead singer and co-bandleader of popular reggae band Dis-N-Dat. His grandson (Debra's son Charleston) teaches steel pan in the Boston Public Schools system.
