= Seminole Manor, Florida =

- CDP
- Location within Florida Location within the United States
- Coordinates: 26°35′01″N 80°06′05″W
- Country: United States
- State: Florida
- County: Palm Beach

Area
  - Total: 0.32 sq mi (0.82 km^{2})
  - Land: 0.32 sq mi (0.82 km^{2})
  - Water: 0 sq mi (0.00 km^{2})
- Elevation: 13 ft (4.0 m)

Population (2020)
  - Total: 2,562
  - Density: 8,048.7/sq mi (3,107.62/km^{2})
- Time zone: UTC-5 (Eastern (EST))
  - Summer (DST): UTC-4 (EDT)
- ZIP code: 33462
- Area codes: 561, 728
- FIPS code: 12-65100
- GNIS feature ID: 2402838

Seminole Manor is a census-designated place (CDP) in Palm Beach County, Florida, United States. The CDP was developed in the late 1950s, with the majority of houses built in 1958 and 1959. It is part of the Miami metropolitan area of South Florida. The population was 2,562 at the 2020 US census.

== Geography ==
According to the United States Census Bureau, the CDP has a total area of 1.1 km^{2} (0.4 mi^{2}), all land.

== Demographics ==
Historical population
Census	Pop.	Note	%±
2000	2,546		—
2010	2,621		2.9%
2020	2,562		−2.3%
U.S. Decennial Census

=== Racial and ethnic composition ===
Seminole Manor CDP, Florida – Racial and ethnic composition Note: the US Census treats Hispanic/Latino as an ethnic category. This table excludes Latinos from the racial categories and assigns them to a separate category. Hispanics/Latinos may be of any race.
Race / Ethnicity (NH = Non-Hispanic)	Pop 2000	Pop 2010	Pop 2020	% 2000	% 2010	% 2020
White alone (NH)	1,346	920	499	52.87%	35.10%	19.48%
Black or African American alone (NH)	431	559	648	16.93%	21.33%	25.29%
Native American or Alaska Native alone (NH)	9	22	4	0.35%	0.84%	0.16%
Asian alone (NH)	23	27	34	0.90%	1.03%	1.33%
Native Hawaiian or Pacific Islander alone (NH)	9	2	0	0.35%	0.08%	0.00%
Other race alone (NH)	0	8	9	0.00%	0.31%	0.35%
Mixed race or Multiracial (NH)	59	37	59	2.32%	1.41%	2.30%
Hispanic or Latino (any race)	669	1,046	1,309	26.28%	39.91%	51.09%
Total	2,546	2,621	2,562	100.00%	100.00%	100.00%

=== 2020 census ===
As of the 2020 census, Seminole Manor had a population of 2,562. The median age was 33.0 years. 29.9% of residents were under the age of 18 and 9.6% of residents were 65 years of age or older. For every 100 females there were 97.4 males, and for every 100 females age 18 and over there were 94.2 males age 18 and over.

100.0% of residents lived in urban areas, while 0.0% lived in rural areas.

There were 719 households in Seminole Manor, of which 44.5% had children under the age of 18 living in them. Of all households, 44.2% were married-couple households, 19.7% were households with a male householder and no spouse or partner present, and 28.0% were households with a female householder and no spouse or partner present. About 16.9% of all households were made up of individuals and 6.6% had someone living alone who was 65 years of age or older.

There were 757 housing units, of which 5.0% were vacant. The homeowner vacancy rate was 1.8% and the rental vacancy rate was 3.5%.

=== Demographic estimates ===
The 2020 ACS 5-year estimates reported 684 families residing in the CDP.

=== 2010 census ===
As of the 2010 United States census, there were 2,621 people, 843 households, and 668 families residing in the CDP.

=== 2000 census ===
As of the census of 2000, there were 2,546 people, 875 households, and 678 families residing in the CDP. The population density was 2,397.6/km^{2} (6,262.4/mi^{2}). There were 933 housing units at an average density of 878.6/km^{2} (2,294.9/mi^{2}). The racial makeup of the CDP was 69.36% White (52.9% were Non-Hispanic White), 17.32% African American, 0.47% Native American, 0.90% Asian, 0.35% Pacific Islander, 8.09% from other races, and 3.50% from two or more races. Hispanic or Latino of any race were 26.28% of the population.

In 2000, there were 875 households, out of which 37.4% had children under the age of 18 living with them, 48.0% were married couples living together, 20.7% had a female householder with no husband present, and 22.5% were non-families. 17.1% of all households were made up of individuals, and 6.5% had someone living alone who was 65 years of age or older. The average household size was 2.91 and the average family size was 3.22.

As of 2000, in the CDP, the population was spread out, with 30.2% under the age of 18, 7.3% from 18 to 24, 29.9% from 25 to 44, 21.1% from 45 to 64, and 11.6% who were 65 years of age or older. The median age was 34 years. For every 100 females, there were 93.2 males. For every 100 females age 18 and over, there were 89.3 males.

In 2000, the median income for a household in the CDP was $36,211, and the median income for a family was $36,797. Males had a median income of $29,630 versus $20,647 for females. The per capita income for the CDP was $13,770. About 11.0% of families and 12.3% of the population were below the poverty line, including 18.8% of those under age 18 and 2.9% of those age 65 or over.

As of 2000, English was the first language for 69.21% of all residents, while Spanish made up 21.01%, and French Creole was the mother tongue for 9.76% of the population.
