= See China and Die =

- Genre: Crime; Drama
- Written by: Larry Cohen
- Directed by: Larry Cohen
- Starring: Esther Rolle; Kene Holliday
- Music by: Joey Levine and Chris Palmaro
- Country of origin: United States
- Original language: English

Production
- Producers: Larry Cohen; Hal Schaffel
- Cinematography: Paul Glickman
- Editor: Armond Lebowitz
- Running time: 86 minutes
- Production company: Big Hit Productions

Original release
- Network: NBC
- Release: January 9, 1981

See China and Die (released in Europe as Hearsay) is a 1981 television film written, produced and directed by Larry Cohen.

== Premise ==
A maid who reads detective stories finds herself embroiled in a real life mystery involving her dead boss and a mysterious statue he brought back from China. She acts as an amateur sleuth to solve the murder of her employer.

== Cast ==
- Esther Rolle as Momma Sykes
- Kene Holliday as Sgt. Alvin Sykes
- Frank Converse as Tom Hackman
- Paul Dooley as Ames Prescott
- Andrew Duggan as Edwin Forbes
- Laurence Luckinbill as Dr. Glickman
- Jean Marsh as Sally Hackman
- Fritz Weaver as Poston
- Jane Hitchcock as Ruth
- Claude Brooks as Jessie Sykes
- William Walker II as Andy Sykes
- Miguel Pinero as Gonzalez
- James Dukas as Transplant

== Production ==
The film was originally produced as a pilot for a mystery/crime series starring Esther Rolle called Momma the Detective, but the show never materialized.
