= The Learning Tree =

1969 semi-autobiographical film by Gordon Parks

- Directed by: Gordon Parks
- Screenplay by: Gordon Parks
- Based on: The Learning Tree; 1963 novel by Gordon Parks
- Produced by: Gordon Parks
- Starring: Kyle Johnson; Alex Clarke; Estelle Evans; Dana Elcar; Mira Waters; Joel Fluellen; Malcolm Atterbury; Richard Ward
- Cinematography: Burnett Guffey
- Edited by: George R. Rohrs
- Music by: Gordon Parks
- Production company: Warner Bros.-Seven Arts
- Distributed by: Warner Bros.-Seven Arts
- Release date: August 6, 1969
- Running time: 107 minutes
- Country: United States
- Language: English
- Box office: $1.5 million (rentals)

The Learning Tree is a 1969 American coming-of-age film written, produced and directed by Gordon Parks, who also scored the film. It depicts the life of Newt Winger, a teenager growing up in Cherokee Flats, Kansas, in the 1920s and chronicles his journey into manhood marked with tragic events. Based on Parks' 1963 semi-autobiographical novel of the same name, The Learning Tree was the first film directed by a Black filmmaker for a major American film studio, Warner Bros.-Seven Arts.

In 1989, The Learning Tree was among the first group of 25 films selected by the Library of Congress for preservation in the United States National Film Registry for being "culturally, historically, or aesthetically significant".

== Plot ==
In 1920s Kansas, a group of African-American boys, Newt Winger, Marcus Savage, and friends steal apples from Jake Kiner's orchard, and when Jake (who is white) confronts the boys, he is beaten and left for dead by Marcus, who later is sent to jail for his actions. While chasing after Marcus and the boys, the racist white sheriff shoots dead an innocent Black boy crossing a river, and the sheriff is not punished.

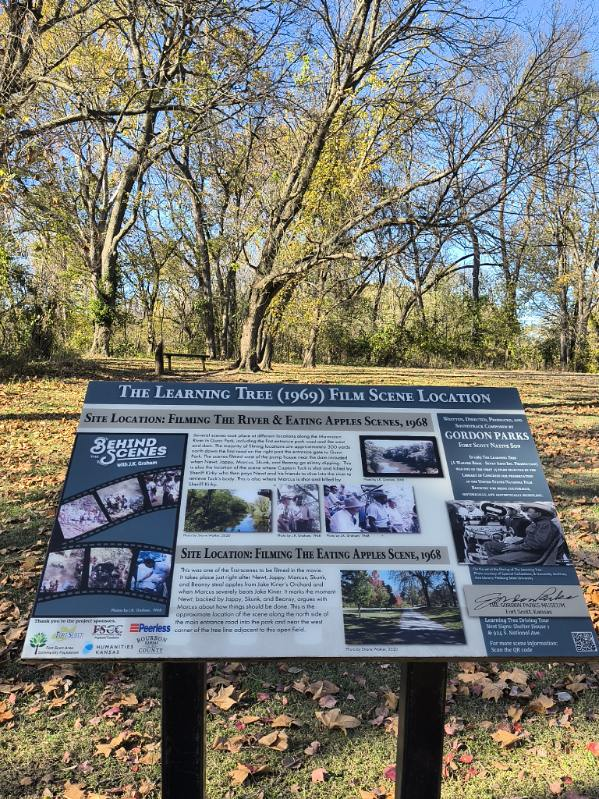
Jake Kiner apple tree filming location.

Newt, despite escapades like ending up in a barn during a tornado with a large local girl who takes off her clothes, does well in school and aims to go to college; a white teacher tries to dissuade him, but the white principal opposes the racism of the town and encourages his ambitions.

While Marcus is in jail, Newt begins to work for Jake to make up for his actions and those of his friends and begins a relationship with Arcella Jefferson, a new girl in town, but his relationship with her is destroyed when Chauncey Cavanaugh, a white boy and son of the local judge, impregnates Arcella (implied to be through rape), who ultimately moves away out of shame. (The judge later apologizes to Newt and his family and says things will be taken care of)

After Marcus leaves jail, he works as a janitor at a brothel. Another scene depicts Newt's winning a boxing match at the county fair, in which he beats Marcus.

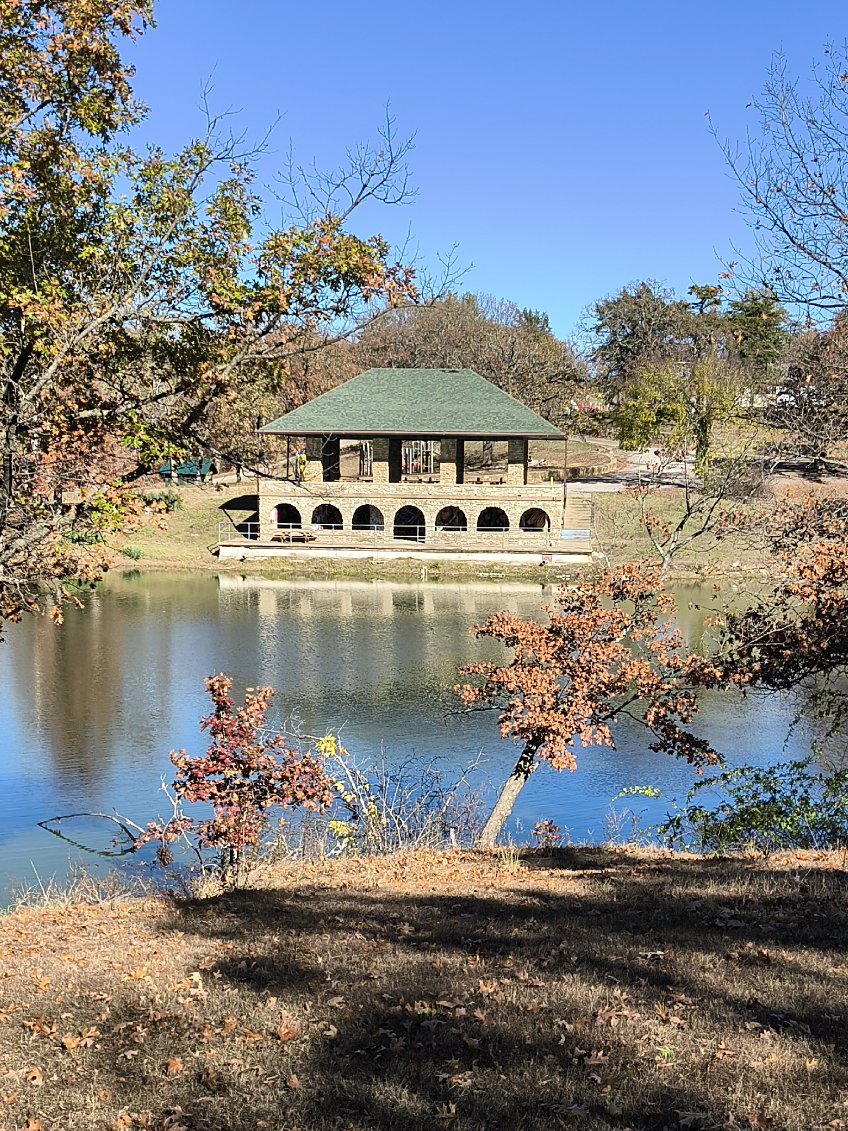
Filming location for picnic gathering where Newt and Arcella go for walk.

One day when Newt had just woken up from a nap in the loft of Jake's barn, he witnesses the brutal attack and murder of Jake by Booker Savage, Marcus' father, who was stealing liquor. Newt initially keeps quiet about what he has seen, but is bothered that Silas Newhall, a white man and disgruntled employee of Jake, who was at the scene of the crime for another reason, is being accused of a murder he did not commit. Encouraged by his mother, Sarah (who dies from the stress of all the goings-on), Newt reveals to Judge Cavanaugh that Booker committed the murder, and he testifies in court. Newt's testimony leads to the suicide of Booker, who seized a gun at the courthouse. Later, Newt is nearly killed by Marcus, who is then shot in the back by the sheriff while running away and who dies in the same river that Newt's and Marcus's friend was shot in. Newt refuses a lift home from the sheriff, and he walks away to an uncertain future.

== Cast ==
- Kyle Johnson as Newt Winger
- Alex Clarke as Marcus Savage
- Estelle Evans as Sarah Winger
- Mira Waters as Arcella Jefferson
- George Mitchell as Jake Kiner
- Richard Ward as Booker Savage
- Malcolm Attenbury as Silas Newhall
- Russell Thorson as Judge Cavanaugh
- Zooey Hall as Chauncey Cavanaugh
- Dana Elcar as Sheriff Kirky
- Felix Nelson as Jack Winger
- Joel Fluellen as Uncle Rob

== Background ==
The film The Learning Tree is based on Gordon Parks's 1963 semi-autobiographical novel of the same name. Parks also wrote the screenplay, and as a result, the script for the film did not deviate much from the book, except for featuring fewer characters for the sake of running time. In addition to being the screenwriter, he was the director, producer, and music composer. Burnett Guffey served as cinematographer, and Parks was assisted by Jack Aldworth and Fred Giles. Parks tried to include as many Black technicians as possible on the film.

Parks personally chose Kyle Johnson to play the character of Newt after a brief meeting with him in a Beverly Hills hotel. However, during the meeting, he gave no indication that he wanted to cast Johnson. Johnson kept getting called for screen tests, and after the fourth test, he learned that he had been hired and that the tests were meant to gauge the abilities of the other actors, not him. Johnson characterized the audition process as "not normal".

According to Turner Classic Movies, the original name of the film was Learn, Baby, Learn, then it was changed to its current name. The current title appears to be taken from a line in the film, one that Sarah Winger tells her son Newt: "Let Cherokee Flats be your learning tree."

== Film production ==
The Learning Tree was bought by Warner Bros.-Seven Arts in 1969 and became the first film directed by a Black person for a major American film studio. Parks later said:

Until a few years ago [B]lacks didn't even dream about getting into movies, except as actors. It was a closed world, sealed off by discrimination. Ken Hyman, the president of Seven Arts, liked my book and knew my photography. We had a meeting that lasted 15 minutes and he gave me the job of directing The Learning Tree. All of those years of prejudice and bigotry were broken down in 15 minutes.

The Learning Tree was shot on location in Fort Scott, Kansas, in the fall of 1968, and the production process was scheduled to take three months. Fort Scott had been where Parks grew up, and it was also the basis for the fictional town of Cherokee Flats.

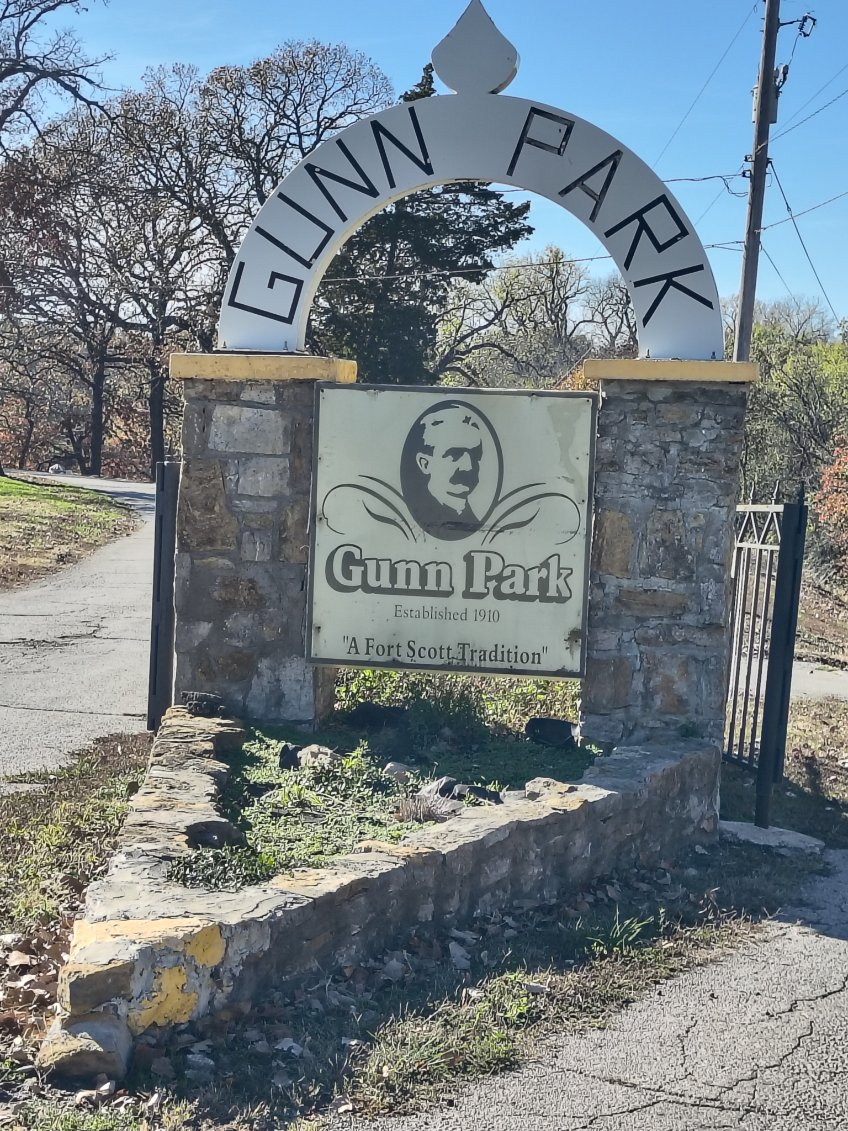
Gunn Park, a Fort Scott area recreational park, served as filming location for various scenes.

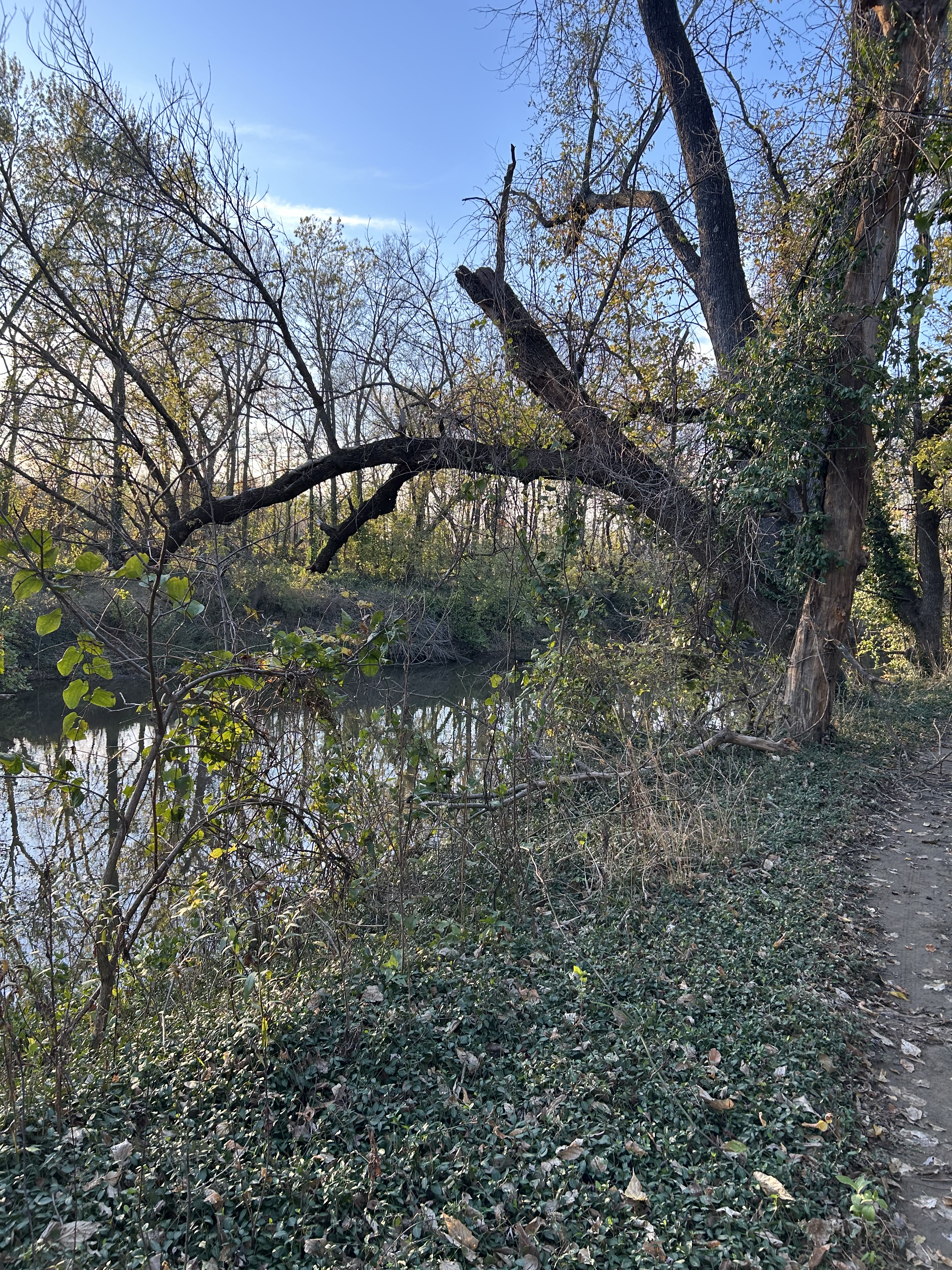
Filming location where Newt, Marcus, and friends go swimming.

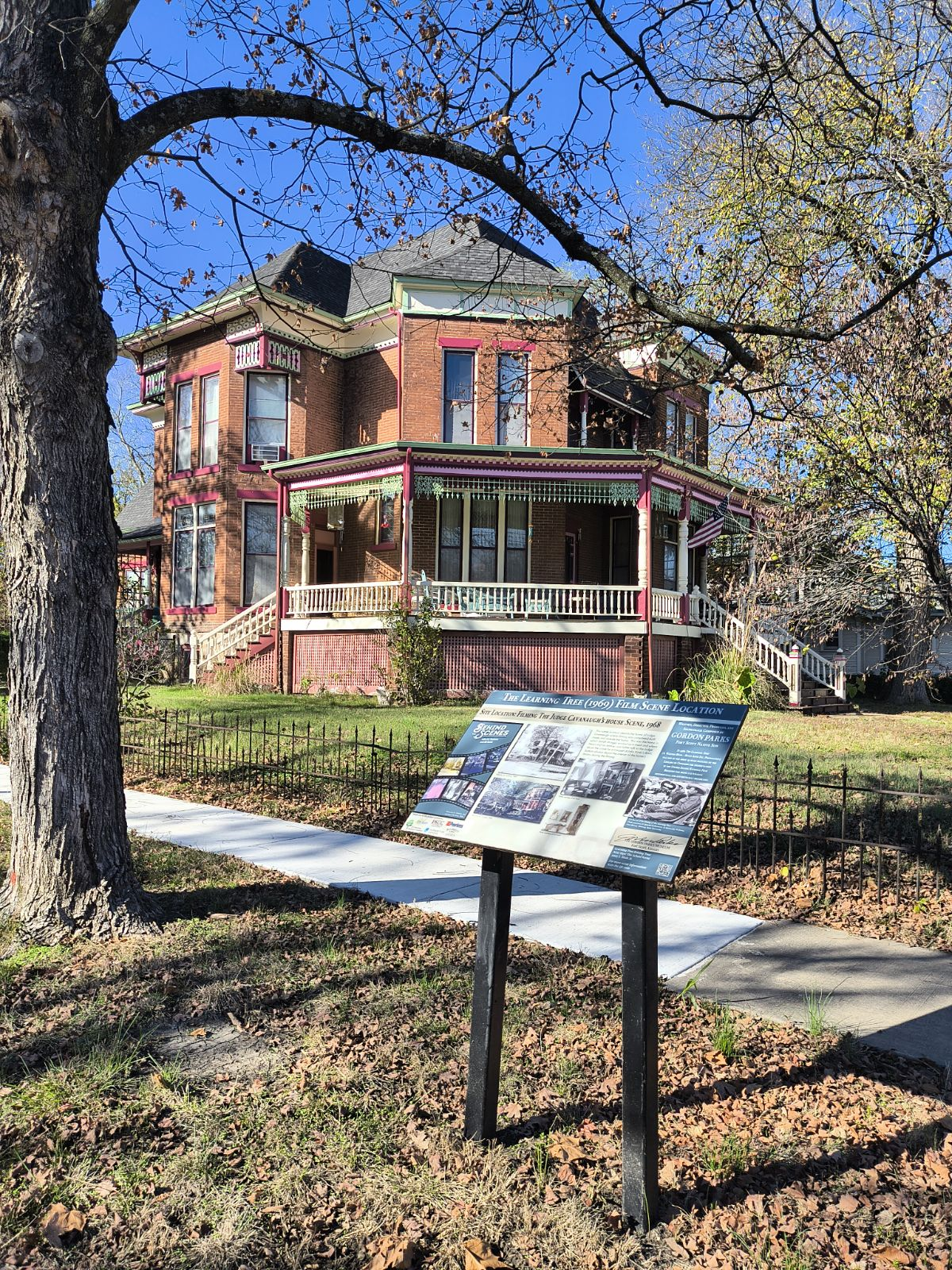
House used for filming as Judge Cavanaugh's residence.

Kyle Johnson remembers that when production began there was a circus in town. As a result, the circus scene in the film features an actual circus rather than a staged one. Moreover, the circus scene included citizens of Fort Scott, who were there for the circus in town anyway.

Additionally, Johnson recalls that his “most enjoyable work as an actor” was done under Gordon Parks. Specifically, Johnson says “I really enjoyed The Learning Tree; for me it was like being part of a tight-run ship, a well-oiled machine. You do your part, and you recognize its importance and relationship to all the other parts, cast, crew, director and so forth.”

Parks is said to have followed his instincts while filming and encouraged the actors to follow their own instincts while acting. This ease while filming arguably contributed to the fact that scenes were shot in very few takes.

During the film production, executives from Warner Bros. often visited the set. Warner sent representatives over to check on Parks and make sure that production was running smoothly, allegedly because Parks was an African-American director.

The US Information Agency produced a film called My Father: Gordon Parks (1969) that film presents a behind-the-scenes look at the production of a feature film based on "The Learning Tree," produced by Allegro Films and directed by Meyer Odze.

== Themes ==
=== Exodusters ===
In 1879, many African Americans migrated to Kansas, and they became known as the "Exodusters". Among those who traveled were the ancestors of Gordon Parks. His father, Andrew Jackson Parks, was a tenant farmer in Kansas. Given that Gordon Parks was born in Fort Scott, Kansas, in 1912, he was the "issue of the second generation of exodusters". His ancestral background played a role in choosing Fort Scott as the filming location for The Learning Tree.

The Exodusters earned their name after nearly 6,000 Black Americans migrated to Kansas after the Emancipation. Their exodus was prompted by the 1879 Windom Resolution that encouraged African Americans to leave the southern states where they were still met with much hatred, even though the American Civil War had ended a little more than a decade earlier. Kansas promised a fresh start for the Exodusters, who wanted to begin a new life, in a new land, away from the southerners who had once enslaved them.

=== Depictions of Black manhood ===
The Learning Tree juxtaposes the lives of Newt Winger and Marcus Savage, two former friends that are trying to find themselves in a white-dominated Midwestern society. Although these two young men have different personalities and different goals in life, both characters represent two examples of Black manhood.

Newt is a young man who tries to adhere to morals, but he is upset by the racial injustice of the day. When adversity occurs, he tries to act with dignity: when he and his friends steal from Jake Kiner, he attempts to make amends by working for him pro bono; when Chauncey Cavanaugh takes a liking to Newt's girlfriend Arcella, he does his best to protect her and ultimately he comes to term with his loss without showing aggression; he tells the truth in the Kiner murder trial despite that it exposes Booker Savage as the killer and shows some African Americans in an unfavorable light. Newt's determination to act ethically is a reflection of his moral character.

In contrast, Marcus is a young man who also is upset by the racial injustice of the day, but retaliates with violence. His rocky relationship with his father does not help his psyche and predisposes him to violence. In the case of Marcus, he begins to embody violence, specifically when he beats Kiner and attempts to murder Newt for sending both him and his father to jail.

== Soundtrack ==
Gordon Parks composed and wrote the following score for The Learning Tree:

1. The Learning Tree – Main Title, sung by O.C. Smith
2. The Storm To Calm
3. Bluebird
4. The Swimming Hole
5. Concerto (Arcella's Theme)
6. Birthday Present
7. Chorale (The Learning Tree)
8. Poor Tuck
9. Questions & Answers
10. My Baby's Gone (feat. Jimmy Rushing)
11. The Fight
12. Confrontation (feat. Kyle Johnson & Joel Fluellen)
13. Hymn – End Title

New York Times reviewer Roger Greenspun praised the film's score in his review, saying that the music "telegraphs and then drains each crisis".

== Reception ==
When The Learning Tree premiered at the Trans-Lux East and West in New York City on August 6, 1969, it was well received by critics. Roger Greenspun wrote in his review that the scenes in the film took on a "kind of ceremonial vitality and lifelikeness". Parks' and Guffey's strong attention to detail helped to make this film beloved and well-remembered to the American public.

It grossed $33,000 in its opening week and reached number one at the US box office in its seventh week of release.

The Learning Tree was among the first group of 25 films to be listed on National Film Registry when the registry was created in 1989.

== See also ==
- List of American films of 1969
- Nadir of American race relations
