= List of songs recorded by Melvin Van Peebles =

List of songs by Melvin Van Peebles, by album, song title, year.

Song	First Recording/Performance	Brer Soul	Ain't Supposed To Die A Natural Death	Watermelon Man	Sweet Sweetback's Baadasssss Song	Ain't Supposed To Die A Natural Death	As Serious As A Heart-Attack	Don't Play Us Cheap	What the....You Mean I Can't Sing?!	Ghetto Gothic	Waltz of the Stork	Notes
Lilly Done The Zampoughi Every Time I Pulled Her Coattail	1969	Yes				Yes				Yes		
Mirror Mirror	1969	Yes				Yes						
The Coolest Place In Town	1969	Yes				Yes						
You Can Get Up Before Noon Without Being A Square	1969	Yes				Yes						
The Dozens	1969	Yes				Yes						
Tenth And Greenwich (Women's House of Detention)	1969	Yes				Yes						
Come Raise Your Leg On Me	1969	Yes				Yes						
Sera Sera Jim	1969	Yes				Yes						
Catch That On The Corner	1969	Yes				Yes						
Three Boxes Of Longs Please	1971		Yes			Yes						
You Aint No Astronaut	1971		Yes			Yes						
Come On Feet Do Your Thing	1971		Yes		Yes	Yes						
Funky Girl On Motherless Broadway	1971		Yes			Yes						
Put A Curse On You	1971		Yes			Yes						
I Got The Blood	1971		Yes			Yes						
You Gotta Be Holdin Out Five Dollars On Me	1971		Yes			Yes						
Heh Heh (Chuckle) Good Morning Sunshine	1971		Yes			Yes						
Salamaggi's Birthday	1971		Yes			Yes						
Rufus & Ruby	1971						Yes					
Mothers Prayer	1971						Yes					
The Country Brother & The City Sister	1971						Yes					
Chippin	1971						Yes					
Just Don't Make No Sense	1971					Yes	Yes			Yes		
Dear Mistuh P	1971						Yes					
Love, That's America	1970			Yes			Yes					
I Remember	1971						Yes					
My Pal Johnny	1971						Yes					
A Birth Certificate Ain't Nothing But A Death Warrant Anyway	1974								Yes			
So Many Bars	1974								Yes			
Save The Watergate 500	1974								Yes			
Superstition	1974								Yes			
There	1974								Yes	Yes	Yes	
Come On Write Me	1974								Yes			
Eyes On The Rabbit	1974								Yes			
My Love Belongs To You	1974								Yes	Yes	Yes	
Blinded By Your Stuff	1995									Yes		
On 115	1995									Yes	Yes	
Greasy Lightin'	1995									Yes		
Same Ole Raggedy Song	1995									Yes		
The Apple Stretching	1983									Yes	Yes	
Quittin Time	1995									Yes		
Soul’d On You	1970			Yes								
Sweetback's Theme	1971				Yes							
Won't Bleed Me	1971				Yes							
And I Love You	1982										Yes	
Tender Understanding	1982										Yes	
Weddings And Funerals	1982										Yes	
Play It As It Lays	1982										Yes	
Shoulders To Lean On	1982										Yes	
