= Melvin Van Peebles discography =

Melvin Van Peebles was an American actor, filmmaker, writer, and composer. Over his career he recorded several albums with various musicians, and also recorded soundtracks.

== Studio albums ==
- Brer Soul (1968)
- Ain't Supposed to Die a Natural Death (1970)
- As Serious as a Heart-Attack (1971)
- What the....You Mean I Can't Sing?! (1974)
- Ghetto Gothic (1995)
- Nahh... Nahh Mofo (2012)
- The Last Transmission (2014, with The Heliocentrics)

== Compilations ==
- X-Rated By an All-White Jury (1997) – including Brer Soul, Ain't Supposed to Die a Natural Death and As Serious as a Heart-Attack

== Soundtrack albums ==
- Watermelon Man (1970)
- Sweet Sweetback's Baadasssss Song (1971)
- Ain't Supposed to Die a Natural Death (1972)
- Don't Play Us Cheap (1972)

In 1968, Van Peebles released a 4-song EP in France to accompany the motion picture with the same name.

== Nahh... Nahh Mofo ==
Van Peebles released a limited vinyl album for his eightieth birthday. It featured his current band at the time, widLaxative. It was distributed at his birthday celebration at the Film Forum.

== The Last Transmission ==
Van Peebles' last recorded release was a concept album with The Heliocentrics released in 2014.
