= Ghetto Gothic =

Studio album by Melvin Van Peebles
- Released: April 4, 1995
- Recorded: 1995
- Genre: Spoken word
- Label: Capitol
- Producer: Melvin Van Peebles

Melvin Van Peebles chronology
What the....You Mean I Can't Sing?! (1974)	Ghetto Gothic (1995)	Nahh... Nahh Mofo (2010)

Ghetto Gothic is the fifth studio album by Melvin Van Peebles. Released in 1995, this album marks the second traditional music effort by Van Peebles, after What the....You Mean I Can't Sing?! Previously, Van Peebles released the experimental spoken word albums Brer Soul, Ain't Supposed To Die a Natural Death and As Serious as a Heart-Attack.

Ghetto Gothic sees Van Peebles embracing a modern production sound, while the music encompasses various music styles, including hip hop, reggae, blues and classical music.

== Background ==
Following the release of Melvin Van Peebles' film Sweet Sweetback's Baadasssss Song, he premiered two musicals on Broadway, Don't Play Us Cheap and Ain't Supposed To Die A Natural Death, deriving from earlier plays he had written in French. To express the ghetto's turmoil and pathos, Van Peebles used sprechgesang as a form he could tell stories in; he recorded three albums using this style, Brer Soul, Ain't Supposed To Die a Natural Death and As Serious as a Heart-Attack. The albums were categorized as spoken word at the time, but was later called a precursor to rapping and hip hop music.

After recording an album which utilized more traditional songwriting, What the....You Mean I Can't Sing?! (1974), Van Peebles did not record another album for 20 years. In 1993, Van Peebles recorded a new song, "Cruel Jim Crow", for his son Mario's film Posse. Melvin stated that he would not record a new album "until I could do it correctly."

Van Peebles turned down a large money offer from a record label that wanted him to perform his lyrics over samples of older recordings. Van Peebles said, "That's not what I do! The structures of my songs are more complicated and subtle than jingles or nursery rhymes, with music which helps carry the story along. The words aren't just shouted over some loop which repeats itself." Van Peebles later received an offer from Capitol Records and told the label "Here's the deal: Send money, and leave me alone. I'll send the tape. That's it. Just go away, and let the doorknob hit you where the good Lord split you." Capitol gave Van Peebles complete artistic control over the recording as a result, and he was satisfied with the business deal, as well as the finished album.

== Music and lyrics ==
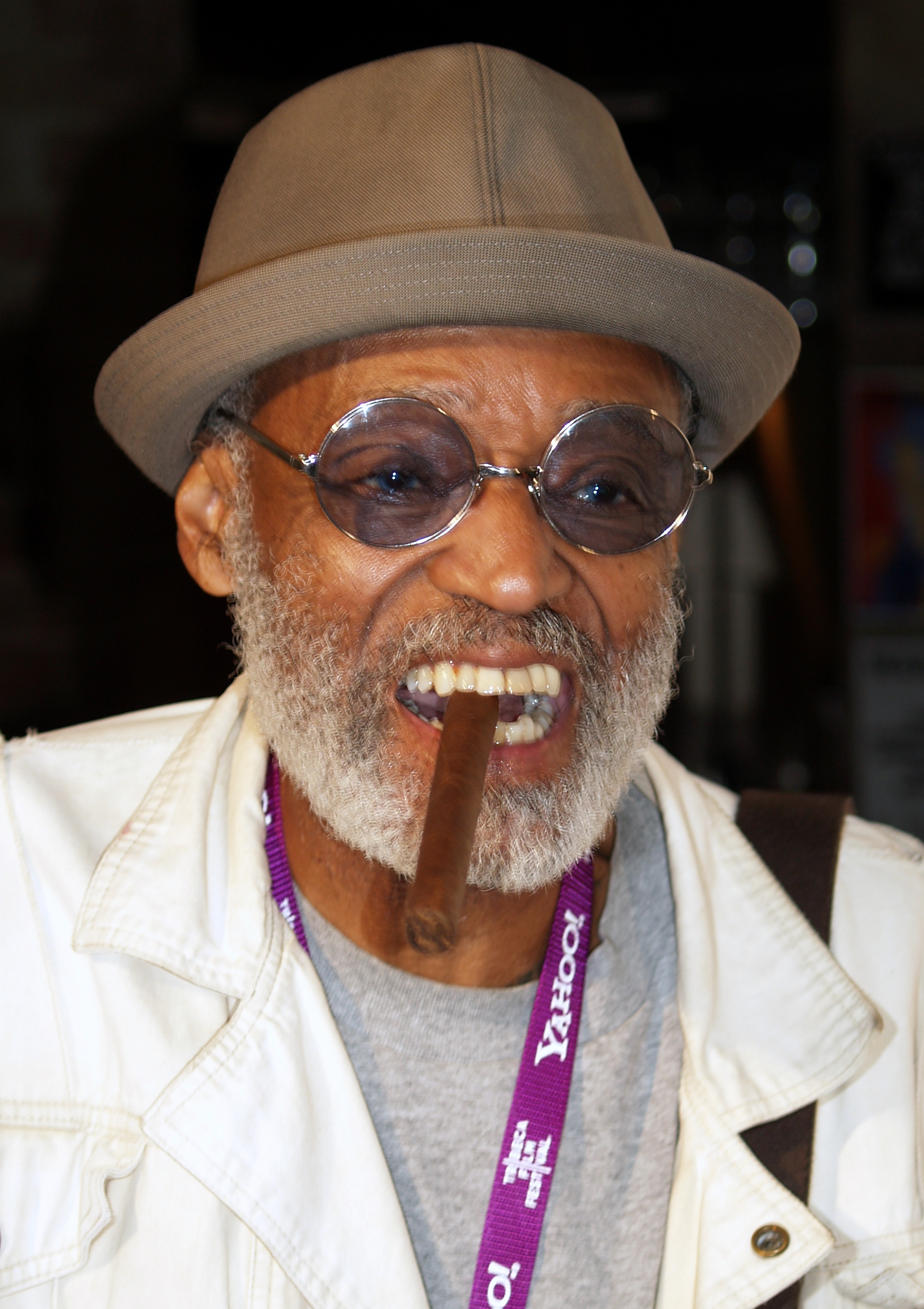
Melvin Van Peebles' performance style on Ghetto Gothic included a mix of spoken vocalization and more traditional singing, due to its mix of songs rerecorded from previous projects.

Ghetto Gothic contains some rerecordings of songs Van Peebles previously recorded for those projects. "My Love Belongs To You" and "There" first appeared on Van Peebles' What the....You Mean I Can't Sing?! The Ghetto Gothic version of "My Love Belongs To You" is modernized with a hip hop beat, and "There" incorporates chamber music, which Billboard writer Jim Bessman says "chillingly portrays an incident of spousal abuse." While it was an older song, Van Peebles felt it had a modern relevance, commenting "It could have been called 'The O. J. Story'. The juxtaposition of an elitist kind of music with my inner city voice takes it beyond the 'hood and shows that it's not just down-and-dirty people who beat their wives."

"Lilly Done The Zampoughi Everytime I Pulled Her Coatail" first appeared on Brer Soul, and "Just Don't Make No Sense" was previously recorded for As Serious as a Heart-Attack. "Quittin' Time" debuted in Van Peebles' 1972 production Don't Play Us Cheap, while "The Apple Stretching" first appeared in Van Peebles' 1982 production Waltz of the Stork, and was later covered by Grace Jones.

Many of Van Peebles' songs are delivered in sprechgesang. Allmusic writer Ed Hogan compares Van Peebles' vocals to "Louis Armstrong, the comedy albums of Bill Cosby from the '70s, and the wild antics of cartoon voice artists Mel Blanc and Hans Conreid [sic]". Another Allmusic writer, Thom Jurek, compared Van Peebles' delivery to that of Bob Dylan and Leonard Cohen. Van Peebles describes his vocal style as "the old Southern style", which was influenced by protest singers he had heard growing up in South Chicago. Van Peebles also said that he was influenced by older forms of African-American music: "[...] people like Blind Lemon Jefferson and the field hollers. I was also influenced by spoken word song styles from Germany that I encountered when I lived in France."

The music of Ghetto Gothic is varied, incorporating elements of classical music, hip hop, reggae, and blues. Van Peebles stated of the album's musical experimentation, "So many black artists are encouraged not to eat from the entire cornucopia of creative and technical options. I'm black; so what I do is black. Once you don't worry about that, you're free to manifest your artistry however you see it." Van Peebles' lyrics range from lighter, humorous themes to more socially conscious material, such as "Just Don't Make Sense", which focuses on the contradictions of the African American experience.

== Release and reception ==
Professional ratings
Review scores
Source	Rating
Allmusic	3/5 stars

Capitol released a sampler to promote Ghetto Gothic, containing the songs "There", "The Apple Stretching" and "On 115", marketing the sampler to alternative outlets, including public radio. Capitol also launched an extensive press campaign for the album which tied with Gramercy Pictures' campaign for the film Panther, which was written by Melvin Van Peebles, and directed by Mario Van Peebles. Capitol's campaign for Ghetto Gothic included a biography written by author Nelson George, and appearances by Melvin and Mario Van Peebles on The Charlie Rose Show.

Melvin Van Peebles also performed a "miniconcert" for a benefit in Detroit, where Sweet Sweetback's Baadasssss Song debuted. Detroit retailers saw potential for the album's success through airplay on jazz and urban contemporary radio stations. Capitol's vice president of creative marketing, Ruth Carson, stated in regards to the campaign, "There's a range of tastes [the album] will appeal to. It's not genre-specific in terms of music buyers: People who buy hip-hop are interested in other forms." Capitol also drew marketing value from Van Peebles' reputation as "the godfather of rap".

Allmusic reviewer Ed Hogan gave Ghetto Gothic three out of five stars, calling it "an idiosyncratic recording from an artist who has been doing cutting-edge work in film, theater and music for four decades."

== Track listing ==
All tracks are written by Melvin Van Peebles.

No.	Title	Length
1.	"Blinded By Your Stuff"	4:55
2.	"On 115"	2:49
3.	"My Love Belongs To You"	4:52
4.	"There"	4:49
5.	"Greasy Lightin'"	3:50
6.	"Lilly Done The Zampoughi Every Time I Pulled Her Coattail"	6:00
7.	"Same Ole Raggedy Song"	2:44
8.	"The Apple Stretching"	10:31
9.	"Just Don't Make No Sense"	5:50
10.	"Quittin Time"	5:59
Total length:		52:22

== Personnel ==
Musicians

- Melvin Van Peebles – vocals
- Anthony Aiello – saxophone
- Lamar Alsop – viola
- Seymour Barab – cello
- Julien Barber – viola
- Katreese Barnes – background vocals
- Warren Benbow – drums
- Don Blackman – organ, piano
- Roger Byam – saxophone
- Barry Finclair – violin
- Kenneth Gordon – violin
- Natalie Kriegler – violin
- Spaceman Patterson – bass, guitar, baritone horn, pocket trumpet
- Dunn Pearson Jr. – keyboards
- Angel Rogers – background vocals
- Norma Jean Wright – background vocals

Production

- Charles "Prince Charles" Alexander – engineer
- Nelson George – liner notes
- Butch Jones – engineer
- Mark Partis – engineer
- William Patterson – arranger, associate producer, programming
- Dunn Pearson Jr. – arranger, associate producer, programming
- Mark Schaffel – engineer
- Tommy Steele – art direction
- Mark Stichman – engineer
- Ezra Tucker – illustrations
- Melvin Van Peebles – arranger, producer
- Harley White – remixing
