= Album musical =

Album type

An album musical is a type of recording that sounds like an original cast album but is created specifically for the recording medium and is a complete entertainment product in itself, rather than just promoting or reflecting an existing or planned musical theatre production or revue. Although there has been no one term consistently used to describe this type of recording, the genre predates the use of the term "concept album" by several decades, dating back to the era of 78-rpm records with such original works as Gordon Jenkins' Manhattan Tower (1946, expanded in 1956), The Letter, (1959) starring Judy Garland, and Stan Freberg's Stan Freberg Presents the United States of America, Volume One: The Early Years (1961). On most contemporary concept albums, the performers or bands sing as themselves, whereas on an album musical the performers are playing characters in a story.

Some original album musicals have later been expanded into staged musicals, including You're a Good Man, Charlie Brown (which was specifically labeled an "Original Album Musical") and, beginning in the late 1960s, such notable rock musicals as Tim Rice, Björn Ulvaeus and Benny Andersson's Chess and The Who's Tommy. Although Andrew Lloyd Webber and Tim Rice may have been anticipating later stage productions when they recorded their two-LP albums of Jesus Christ Superstar and Evita, at the time of their initial release they were, in essence, album musicals.

== Recordings ==
The album musical as a distinct type of recording was popularized by composer/conductor Gordon Jenkins who created a set of 78 rpm records in 1946 called Manhattan Tower and later expanded the dialogue and music in 1956 to take advantage of the longer playing time of LP records. Although Manhattan Tower was performed in concert halls, Las Vegas, on television (with Ethel Waters, Cesar Romero and Phil Harris) and later re-recorded on separate record albums by both Patti Page and Robert Goulet, it was never actually presented as a stage musical. Jenkins later created the album musicals California: A Musical Narrative, Seven Dreams, and The Letter starring Judy Garland.

In 1954, David Lippincott, a jingle writer at McCann-Erickson, an advertising agency, wrote the music and lyrics for an album musical called The Body in the Seine, featuring Broadway performers Alice Pearce and George S. Irving, among others, in the hope of finding a book writer to expand his score into a Broadway musical. Because of the limited release of the album, The Body in the Seine is one of the rarest album musicals.

A 1957 MGM recording, Frankie and Johnny, with music by Robert Cobert and lyrics by Dion McGregor, featured Danny Scholl (Top Banana), Joan Coburn (Gentlemen Prefer Blondes), Nat Frey (Damn Yankees) and MGM recording artist Mary Mayo. Also in the cast were Frank Aletter (Bells Are Ringing), Peggy Cass (Auntie Mame) and William Lanteau (Newhart). The recording, which features dialogue and songs, is a complete musical drama with orchestrations by Philip J. Lang. It is unrelated to the 1966 movie starring Elvis Presley.

A 1959 album musical called Clara, featuring Broadway performers Betty Garrett (Call Me Mister) and James Komack (Damn Yankees), was subsequently expanded into a Broadway musical called Beg, Borrow or Steal that played five performances at the Martin Beck Theater in February 1960. Betty Garrett, repeating her role from the record, was joined on stage by her husband, Larry Parks, Biff McGuire and Eddie Bracken.

One of the best-selling album musicals of the early 1960s was Stan Freberg Presents the United States of America, Volume One: The Early Years, released in 1961 on Capitol Records and billed as "An Original Musical Review Created Specifically For Stereo" (or "For Records," in the monaural version). Stan Freberg's extravagant musical comedy dealt with the birth of the United States of America in satiric terms and featured original songs, sketches and even dancing (tap-dancing Indians). Freberg had planned to release at least two follow-up albums, but he was approached by producer David Merrick with an offer to move the work to Broadway. By the time the proposed production was cancelled, Freberg had moved on to other projects and Stan Freberg Presents the United States of America, Volume Two was not released until 1996, with several of the surviving cast members from the original album, along with several new performers.

In 1963, The Ballad Of Fanny Hill, a double-record set subtitled "An Original Musical Monodrama Based Upon the Book Memoirs of a Woman of Pleasure by John Cleland," was released on Fax Records, a label noted primarily for its suggestive comedy LPs. Although authorship credit on the LP jacket is given to "Charles Sydney" and "Gerald Coates," the recording, which featured the bawdy humor of the novel, was actually the product of lyricist Sid Kuller and composer/musical director Gerald Dolin. The solo performer is the pseudonymous Julie Hamilton.

Clark Gesner's album musical, You're a Good Man, Charlie Brown, which had been released on MGM's children's label Leo Records as an "Original Album Musical," was successfully expanded into a long-running Off-Broadway musical in 1967. MGM also released the Original Cast Recording of the stage show. Melvin Van Peebles' darkly comic and explicit 1970 album, Ain't Supposed to Die a Natural Death, became a Tony-nominated Broadway musical in October 1971, interpolating material from two of Van Peebles' other albums, Brer Soul and As Serious as a Heart-Attack, as well. A number of popular rock musicals (or "rock operas") began as original album musicals, including Jesus Christ Superstar, Evita, Chess, The Who's Tommy, The War of the Worlds, The Wall and American Idiot.

An interesting variation on the album musical is A Complete Authentic Minstrel Show released in both monaural and stereo in 1958 on the budget label, Somerset Records. The album is a compilation of classic songs and jokes featured in American minstrel shows, a form of entertainment that was popular during the later 19th and early 20th centuries. Because of the often negative stereotypes of African-Americans, the genre quickly lost public favor with the birth of the civil rights movement. Although the recorded material is not original, the fact that the album simulates a live stage performance (without actually be derived from such a performance) makes it a form of album musical. Epic Records released two minstrel show recordings of its own a few years later called Gentlemen, Be Seated! and its sequel, Gentlemen, Be Seated! (Again). Similar albums were created that simulate old vaudeville and burlesque shows.

Frank Zappa's Joe's Garage (1979) and Thing-Fish (1984) were album musicals. The material of Thing-Fish was presented as an "original cast recording"; Zappa had intended to stage it as a play, but was unable to find financing, and it was subsequently staged after his death, as was Joe's Garage. Joe's Garage was a satire of music censorship in the form of an anti-music government propaganda play, while Thing-Fish encompassed conspiracy theories surrounding AIDS and satire of Broadway tropes, racial stereotypes, homosexuality, political correctness and feminism.

A more recent album musical is Hungarian-American composer and playwright Bálint Varga and lyricist Lia Barcellona Tamborra's d'ILLUSION: The Houdini Musical (2020), inspired by the life of illusionist/stunt performer Harry Houdini (played by Julian R. Decker). All of the participating actors, voice talents and musicians recorded their parts remotely from all over the world while quarantined inside their homes due to the COVID-19 pandemic and its impact on the performing arts.

== See also ==
- Concept album
