= Posse (1993 film) =

1993 film

- Theatrical release poster
- Directed by: Mario Van Peebles
- Written by: Sy Richardson; Dario Scardapane
- Produced by: Preston Holmes; Jim Steele
- Starring: Stephen Baldwin; Richard Gant; Richard Jordan; Big Daddy Kane; Charles Lane; Tiny Lister; Tone Lōc; Salli Richardson; Blair Underwood; Mario Van Peebles; Robert Hooks; Reginald VelJohnson; Billy Zane
- Cinematography: Peter Menzies Jr.
- Edited by: Mark Conte; Seth Flaum
- Music by: Michel Colombier
- Production companies: Working Title Films; PolyGram Filmed Entertainment
- Distributed by: Gramercy Pictures
- Release date: May 14, 1993
- Running time: 111 minutes
- Country: United States
- Language: English
- Budget: $3.5 million
- Box office: $20 million

Posse is a 1993 American Western film directed by and starring Mario Van Peebles. Featuring a large ensemble cast, the film tells the story of a posse of African-American soldiers and one ostracized white soldier, who are all betrayed by a corrupt colonel. The story starts with the group escaping with a cache of gold, and continues with their leader Jesse Lee (Mario Van Peebles) taking revenge on the men who killed his preacher father. The story is presented as a flashback told by an unnamed old man (Woody Strode). The title of the film refers to a group of people who are summoned to help law enforcement officers. This film was the first to be released by Gramercy Pictures.

Melvin Van Peebles, the father of director Mario Van Peebles, recorded a new song, "Cruel Jim Crow", for the film. This marked his first music recording in 20 years, after his 1974 album What the....You Mean I Can't Sing?! It led to the production of a new album, Ghetto Gothic, released in 1995. The film takes the form of an extended memory, as told by Woody Strode, who witnessed some of the events as a young boy. Strode's opening narration, documenting early black settlers, continues his onscreen naming of individuals overlooked by history from the 1972 documentary Black Rodeo.

== Plot ==
In 1898, convicted prisoner Buffalo Soldiers from the U.S. Army's 10th Cavalry Regiment, led by Jesse Lee (Mario Van Peebles), are conscripted to fight in the Spanish–American War in Cuba. As the segregated African-American unit is barely holding its own against constant attacks from enemy troops, Jesse runs back to the command post of the corrupt and racist Colonel Graham (Billy Zane) to request that the 10th Cavalry be allowed to pull back. Colonel Graham orders Jesse to shoot a White prisoner in exchange for allowing the 10th to retreat. Unable to kill a man in cold blood, Jesse demonstrates excellent marksmanship by shooting the man's cigar from his mouth. Colonel Graham then kills the prisoner (under the guise of desertion), and offers Jesse's command of the 10th to Little J (Stephen Baldwin), another White prisoner (the alternative would be to face the firing squad). Graham then orders the 10th to fall back in order to begin another mission, one in which they will be required to wear civilian clothing, as opposed to their Cavalry uniforms. They are ordered to rob a Spanish gold shipment, which is a setup to give the Colonel an excuse to execute the entire 10th Cavalry as deserters. As he meets them with his own cavalry force, his aide Weezie (Charles Lane) causes a distraction, allowing the 10th to shoot the Colonel and his cavalry down.

With Colonel Graham and his troops supposedly dead, the remnants of the 10th—including Jesse, Obobo (Tiny Lister), Angel (Tone-Lōc) and Little J, along with Weezie sneak out of Cuba and Jesse leads them to New Orleans. Soon after their arrival, Little J meets a gambler named Father Time (Big Daddy Kane) and they begin playing poker, at which point Time is caught cheating. Little J helps the gambler escape and they go back to the hotel room where the others are hiding, telling them "We were never here" in fear that the vengeful gamblers might come for them. Doing just as J feared, the gamblers come in search of him and Father Time, only to be shot in the back by Colonel Graham and his troops, who survived the skirmish in Cuba. Angel is killed in the firefight while Little J, Father Time, and the others barely escape. They meet up with Jesse who had left earlier to finish some business in a town out West.

The newly formed "posse" heads West with Colonel Graham on their heels every step of the way. They eventually stop in a town where Jesse has ammunition custom-made out of gold in order to kill the demons of his past, using one to kill the man who made the ammunition—as he was one of the men who lynched Jesse's father King David (Robert Hooks) years earlier. They make their way to Freemanville, a town founded by King David and composed entirely of African-Americans. Jesse is reunited with several old acquaintances, including his good friend Carver (Blair Underwood), who is now the sheriff of Freemanville. Carver's deputy goes to Cutterstown, not wanting to tip anyone off that Carver is working with Cutterstown's sheriff, Bates (Richard Jordan). He informs Bates that Jesse has returned to Freemanville. The "posse" enjoys the hospitality of Freemanville until Bates tells Carver that the town will burn unless Jesse is turned over to him and his deputies. Bates and a few of his deputies attack Freemanville that same night looking for Jesse. One of the deputies beats Weezie in order to get answers. Watching in disgust, Little J fights back in defense of Weezie. Outnumbered, Little J is kicked and beaten to death by Bates and his men, and Obobo and Jesse's former mentor Papa Joe (Melvin Van Peebles) are taken to Cutterstown as prisoners. Jesse and Father Time soon rescue them by posing as Ku Klux Klan members and storming into the Cutterstown jail. Jesse kills one of the deputies, who was another one of King David's murderers. When Bates arrive at the jail, he shoots and kills the mayor. Colonel Graham arrives right after and aligns himself with the Sheriff as a fellow "friend" of Jesse.

When Jesse returns, he convinces a handful of townspeople (but not Carver) to fight Sheriff Bates by telling them the Sheriff wants the land for himself to sell to the railroad when it comes through. The citizens of Freemanville fight Bates the next day when he rides in, with Jesse Lee stating that if Freemanville burns, so would Cutterstown before motioning to set off a stick of dynamite. As they begin to gain the upper hand, Colonel Graham arrives with his cavalry and a Gatling gun which he uses to cut the people down. Jesse charges the gun with a stick of dynamite, destroying the gun and killing some of Graham's troops while Weezie and Father Time arrive onto the scene.

Meanwhile, Carver plans to flee with the deeds to all of the property in Freemanville—all of which are in his name—but is stopped by Papa Joe's daughter Lana (Salli Richardson). Father Time shows up just in time to stop Carver from harming Lana. Time kills one of Carver's deputies, but is killed by Carver. Before Carver can flee, he is stopped by Bates who reveals that they had a deal to split the proceeds from the land 50-50. Jesse arrives just in time to hear about the deal, and watches as Carver is betrayed and murdered by Bates. Jesse kills Bates in a showdown, finally putting his past demons to rest. Colonel Graham captures Lana and orders Jesse into the saloon, where they have a climactic fight resulting in Graham's death and the destruction of the saloon (which Graham had set ablaze). Jesse, Obobo, Weezie and Lana watch as the townspeople fight the fire.

The story ends almost a century later with an old man (Woody Strode) being interviewed by reporters (Reginald Hudlin, Warrington Hudlin) about the black cowboys of the Old West. The man, who was a young boy when he met Jesse in Freemanville, gives the reporters a small book that Jesse had given him.

In the end, a caption goes on to tell that there had been over 8,000 black cowboys in the Old West whose stories had never been told due to omission by Hollywood and others alike.

== Cast ==
- Mario Van Peebles as Jesse Lee
- Stephen Baldwin as Jimmy J. "Little J" Teeters
- Billy Zane as Colonel Graham
- Tone-Lōc as Angel
- Melvin Van Peebles as Joe "Papa Joe"
- Tiny Lister as Obobo
- Big Daddy Kane as "Father Time"
- Reginald VelJohnson as Preston
- Blair Underwood as Sheriff Carver
- Isaac Hayes as Cable
- Charles Lane as "Weezie"
- Robert Hooks as David "King David" Lee
- Richard Jordan as Sheriff Bates
- Pam Grier as Phoebe
- Nipsey Russell as Snopes
- Paul Bartel as Mayor Bigwood
- Salli Richardson as Lana
- Woody Strode as The Storyteller
- Aaron Neville as Railroad Singer
- Reginald Hudlin as Reporter #1
- Warrington Hudlin as Reporter #2
- Richard Gant as Doubletree
- Richard Edson as Deputy Tom
- Stephen J. Cannell as Jimmy Love
- Scott Bray as The Fire Eater
- Vesta as Vera
- Faizon Love as John
- T.J. McClain as "LA Slim"
- Steve Reevis as Two Bears
- Snoop Dogg as Aric Pope

== Release ==
Posse was the first film to be released by Gramercy Pictures, which would eventually become Focus Features. It grossed $18.2 million in the U.S. and Canada and $20 million worldwide.

== Soundtrack ==
1. Intelligent Hoodlum - The Posse (Shoot 'Em Up)
2. Tone-Lōc - Posse Love
3. B.B.O.T.I. (Badd Boyz of The Industry) - One Night of Freedom
4. Melvin Van Peebles - Cruel Jim Crow (Posse Don't Play That)
5. Top Choice Clique - I Think To Myself
6. Michel Colombier - Jesse
7. Vesta - Tell Me
8. David + David - Free At Last
9. Salli Richardson - If I Knew You At All
10. Sounds of Blackness - Freemanville (Homecoming)
11. Vesta - Ride of Your Life
12. The Neville Brothers - Let That Hammer Fall

== Reception ==
On the review aggregator website Rotten Tomatoes, 33% of 18 critics' reviews are positive, with an average rating of 5.1/10. Metacritic, which uses a weighted average, assigned the film a score of 56 out of 100, based on 20 critics, indicating "mixed or average" reviews.

Janet Maslin of The New York Times stated: "On the one hand, this obviously talented film maker celebrates all the aggrandizing features of the genre: the laconic tough talk, the manly camaraderie, the proud posturing, the power of walking tall past the awestruck citizenry of a prairie town. On the other hand, "Posse" does its best to reject and avenge what it regards as the flagrant distortions of the past."

Roger Ebert described it as "an overdirected, overphotographed, overdone movie that is so distracted by its hectic, relentless style that the story line is rendered almost incoherent."

Entertainment Weekly gave it a C+ and said it was "a glossy, kinetic pastiche of Western conventions."
