= List of Billboard number-one dance/disco singles of 1983 =

The Dance/Disco Top 80 was a chart published weekly by Billboard magazine in the United States, which ranked the popularity of dance singles in nightclubs across the country, based on a national survey of club disc jockeys.

== Chart history ==
Issue date	Song	Artist	Reference(s)
January 1	"It's Raining Men"	The Weather Girls	
January 8	"Lies"/ "Beach Culture"	Thompson Twins	
January 15	"Lies"/ "Beach Culture"	Thompson Twins	
January 22	Thriller (all cuts)	Michael Jackson	
January 29	Thriller (all cuts)	Michael Jackson	
February 5	Thriller (all cuts)	Michael Jackson	
February 12	Thriller (all cuts)	Michael Jackson	
February 19	Thriller (all cuts)	Michael Jackson	
February 26	Thriller (all cuts)	Michael Jackson	
March 5	Thriller (all cuts)	Michael Jackson	
March 12	Thriller (all cuts)	Michael Jackson	
March 19	Thriller (all cuts)	Michael Jackson	
March 26	Thriller (all cuts)	Michael Jackson	
April 2	Thriller (all cuts)	Michael Jackson	
April 9	"Jeopardy"	The Greg Kihn Band	
April 16	"Jeopardy"	The Greg Kihn Band	
April 23	"Angel Man (G.A.)"	Rhetta Hughes	
April 30	"Let's Dance"	David Bowie	
May 7	"Let's Dance"	David Bowie	
May 14	"Let's Dance"	David Bowie	
May 21	"Let's Dance"	David Bowie	
May 28	"Let's Dance"	David Bowie	
June 4	"Let's Dance"	David Bowie	
June 11	"Flashdance... What a Feeling"	Irene Cara	
June 18	"Flashdance... What a Feeling"	Irene Cara	
June 25	"Flashdance... What a Feeling"	Irene Cara	
July 2	"The Safety Dance"	Men Without Hats	
July 9	"(Keep Feeling) Fascination"	The Human League	
July 16	"I.O.U."	Freeez	
July 23	"I.O.U."	Freeez	
July 30	"State Farm"/ "Nobody's Diary"	Yaz	
August 6	"State Farm"/ "Nobody's Diary"	Yaz	
August 13	"State Farm"/ "Nobody's Diary"	Yaz	
August 20	"Do It Again Medley with Billie Jean"	Slingshot	
August 27	"Rockit"	Herbie Hancock	
September 3	"Rockit"	Herbie Hancock	
September 10	"Rockit"	Herbie Hancock	
September 17	"Rockit"	Herbie Hancock	
September 24	"Holiday"/ "Lucky Star"	Madonna	
October 1	"Holiday"/ "Lucky Star"	Madonna	
October 8	"Holiday"/ "Lucky Star"	Madonna	
October 15	"Holiday"/ "Lucky Star"	Madonna	
October 22	"Holiday"/ "Lucky Star"	Madonna	
October 29	"Let the Music Play"	Shannon	
November 5	"Let the Music Play"	Shannon	
November 12	"Let the Music Play"	Shannon	
November 19	"Let the Music Play"	Shannon	
November 26	"Let the Music Play"	Shannon	
December 3	"Let the Music Play"	Shannon	
December 10	"Talking in Your Sleep"	The Romantics	
December 17	"Talking in Your Sleep"	The Romantics	
December 24	"Say It Isn't So"	Daryl Hall and John Oates	
December 31	"Say It Isn't So"	Daryl Hall and John Oates	

== See also ==
- 1983 in music
- List of Billboard Hot 100 number ones of 1983
