= What the....You Mean I Can't Sing?! =

Studio album by Melvin Van Peebles
- Released: 1974
- Recorded: 1974
- Genre: Funk; soul
- Label: Atlantic
- Producer: Melvin Van Peebles

Melvin Van Peebles chronology
As Serious as a Heart-Attack (1974)	What the....You Mean I Can't Sing?! (1974)	Ghetto Gothic (1995)

What the...You Mean I Can't Sing?! is the fourth studio album by Melvin Van Peebles. Released in 1974, this album marks the first traditional music effort by Van Peebles. Previously, Van Peebles released the experimental spoken word albums Brer Soul, Ain't Supposed to Die a Natural Death and As Serious as a Heart-Attack.

What the...You Mean I Can't Sing?! largely derives from funk and soul music, much as Van Peebles had featured on the soundtrack to his 1971 film Sweet Sweetback's Baadasssss Song.

== Background ==
Prior to the recording of this album, Van Peebles had released a trio of experimental albums, Brer Soul, Ain't Supposed to Die a Natural Death and As Serious as a Heart-Attack, which were considered to be spoken word at the time, due to their use of sprechgesang. Modern critics have since dubbed these albums as precursors to hip hop music. Van Peebles wanted to record an album that showed that he could perform in a more traditional form, as opposed to the style he had used on his previous albums, titling it What the....You Mean I Can't Sing?! because of this.

== Music style and lyrical themes ==
What the....You Mean I Can't Sing?! places more emphasis on harmony and melody, aspects that Van Peebles felt he had "subliminally pushed into the background" on his previous albums. While Van Peebles said that some of the album's songs could have been written in a spoken word form, he decided to include more musical instrumentation than he had previously. Allmusic writer Ed Hogan compares Van Peebles' vocals to "Louis Armstrong, the comedy albums of Bill Cosby from the '70s, and the wild antics of cartoon voice artists Mel Blanc and Hans Conreid [sic]". Another Allmusic writer, Thom Jurek, compared Van Peebles' delivery to that of Bob Dylan and Leonard Cohen. Van Peebles describes his vocal style as "the old Southern style", which was influenced by singers he had heard growing up in South Chicago. Van Peebles also said that he was influenced by older forms of African-American music: "[...] people like Blind Lemon Jefferson and the field hollers. I was also influenced by spoken word song styles from Germany that I encountered when I lived in France."

The music on What the....You Mean I Can't Sing?! largely derives from funk and soul music. Van Peebles' lyrics encompass themes ranging from lighter and humorous to more socially conscious themes, although it is less politically oriented than Van Peebles' spoken word albums; the most political song on the album is "Save The Watergate 500", which refers to the Watergate scandal. Domestic violence is explored on "There", which Van Peebles described as "a story of how a guy who gets it on the job comes home and kicks his old lady's ass." Because Van Peebles wanted to pay tribute to another singer, he recorded a version of "Superstition", a song by Stevie Wonder, who he admired.

Other songs express emotions, such as "Come On Write Me", which expresses vulnerability, something Van Peebles later said was absent from modern recordings by African American males. Van Peebles wrote "Eyes On The Rabbit" as a joke, inspired by the piano player's wife, who he described as "sappy". Van Peebles said, "I'm going to write the sappiest song I can." Van Peebles rehearsed the song at the piano player's house, where the saxophonist and his wife, and the pianist and his wife stayed inside and watched Van Peebles playing the song outside. Van Peebles walked over to the window and saw that none of them laughed at the song. He initially thought they didn't want to laugh at him, but realized that all of them were crying, and the song had a different emotional impact than he had intended. One of the watchers congratulated Van Peebles on the song, but Van Peebles explained that the song was a joke, angering him and his girlfriend, who wanted to beat Van Peebles up. Van Peebles backed off by claiming that the song wasn't a joke.

== Release and reception ==
Professional ratings
Review scores
Source	Rating
Allmusic	4/5 stars

What the....You Mean I Can't Sing?! was initially released by Atlantic Records in 1974. Radio stations refused to play any song from the album, demanding an explanation as to what the symbols on the album cover's word balloon meant. Van Peebles said that it was "a private joke and his secret".

In 2003, the album was reissued on compact disc by Water, a subsidiary of Atlantic. The reissued album was covered in the March 2004 issue of Spin, which recommended "A Birth Certificate Ain't Nothing but a Death Warrant Anyway" in its "The Mix Club" section as a "hot [track] to impress your CD pen pals", writing, "He can't [sing]. [...] [But] this 1974 joint is still one of the darkest R&B numbers ever." Allmusic writer Thom Jurek gave the album four out of five stars, calling it "a deeply musical, funky masterpiece of rage, righteous indignation, and soulful killer grooves". However, Jurek criticized the reissue for not including musician credits.

== Track listing ==
All tracks are written by Melvin Van Peebles, except for "Superstition", written by Stevie Wonder.

No.	Title	Length
1.	"A Birth Certificate Ain't Nothing But A Death Warrant Anyway"	3:57
2.	"So Many Bars"	4:11
3.	"Save The Watergate 500"	3:21
4.	"Superstition"	5:05
5.	"There"	3:58
6.	"Come On Write Me"	3:42
7.	"Eyes On The Rabbit"	5:09
8.	"My Love Belongs To You"	10:22
Total length:		39:48

== Personnel ==
Musicians

- Melvin Van Peebles – lead vocals
- Kenny Altman – bass
- Bob Babbitt – bass
- David Cohen – guitar
- George David – guitar
- Leopoldo Fleming – percussion
- Jerry Friedman – guitar
- Rhetta Hughes – background vocals
- Tali Jackson – drums
- Arthur Jenkins – keyboards
- Bob Mann – guitar
- Barbara Massey – background vocals
- Andrew Smith – drums
- Warren Smith – percussion
- J. Steven Soles – guitar
- Tasha Thomas – background vocals
- Christie Thompson – keyboards
- Harold Wheeler – arranger, conductor, keyboards

Production

- Charles Blackwell – executive producer
- Tony Bongiovi – remixing
- Gary Hobish – remastering
- Michael Myers – liner notes
- Abdullah Rahman – artwork
- Dave Rubin – cover design
- Mark Rubin – cover design
- Stephen Y. Scheaffer – engineer
- LeBaron Taylor – executive producer
- Pat Thomas – reissue producer
- Melvin Van Peebles – liner notes, photography, producer
