= Nellie A. Buchanan =

American educator and theatre professional (1900–1993)

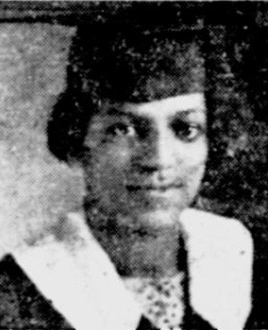
- Born: Nellie Adelaide Buchanan; July 18, 1900
- Died: August 1, 1993 (aged 93)
- Education: Morgan College (class of 1921)
- Occupations: teacher of Latin and drama
- Known for: National President, Zeta Phi Beta (1923-1925)

Nellie A. Buchanan (July 18, 1900 – August 1, 1993) was an American educator and theatre professional. She was the fourth international president of the historically black sorority Zeta Phi Beta, serving from 1923 to 1925.

== Early life and education ==
Nellie Adelaide Buchanan was the daughter of George H. E. C. Buchanan and Nellie Buchanan. Her sisters were Lottie May Lee Downs and Edna R. Ford. She graduated from Frederick Douglass High School in Baltimore in 1917, and completed further education at Morgan College in 1921. She earned a master's degree from the University of Pennsylvania in 1941.

== Career ==
Nellie A. Buchanan was the fourth international president of Zeta Phi Beta, serving from 1923 to 1925. She established the first graduate chapter of the sorority in 1923, in Baltimore, with four classmates from Morgan College. She also established the sorority's official headquarters at Howard University. She remained active with the sorority throughout her adult life.

From 1923, Buchanan taught Latin and drama at Frederick Douglass High School, which was the only school in Maryland offering a 12th grade curriculum for black students. One of her students was Broadway actor Avon Long, who honored Buchanan at a special performance at the National Theatre in Washington. She was also said to have helped Douglass alumni Cab Calloway and Anne Brown early in their careers. Among her students were Clarence Mitchell Jr. and Thurgood Marshall. Former student Frances L. Murphy, who became a newspaper publisher, recalled Buchanan as her Latin teacher, saying "Oh, I admired her so much." Another former Latin student of Buchanan's, educator Sydney Cousin, remembered that Miss Buchanan gave summer homework, and required her students to recite the Pledge of Allegiance in Latin. She retired from teaching in 1970.

In 1949 Buchanan was program director at Camp Francis M. Wood, a summer camp program for needy black children sponsored by the City of Baltimore. She was also a director with the Negro Little Theater of Baltimore in the 1930s.

== Personal life ==
In 1955, Buchanan was the first black resident of the Windsor Hills neighborhood of Baltimore. In 1975, her teenaged great-nephew Maurice Ford, who lived in her house, died in a "questionable shooting". Buchanan died in 1993, aged 93 years, in Baltimore.
