= Avon Long =

American actor

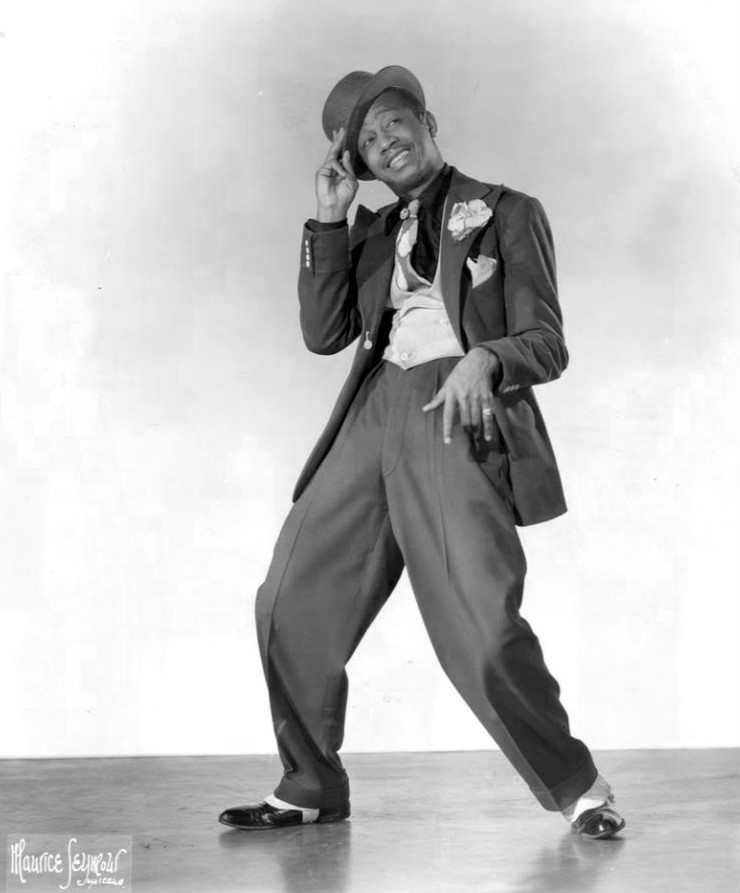
- Long in 1943 (wearing a zoot suit).
- Born: June 18, 1910; Baltimore, Maryland
- Died: February 15, 1984 (aged 73); New York City
- Years active: 1932–1984
- Spouse: Gretchen Cotton
- Children: 3

Avon Long (June 18, 1910 – February 15, 1984) was an American Broadway actor and singer.

== Early years ==
Long was born in Baltimore, Maryland. He had typhoid fever when he was 2 years old, and he later said that the disease affected his feet, giving him "the hard bone structure a dancer needs". He attended Frederick Douglass High School, where he was especially influenced by the Latin teacher and drama coach, Nellie A. Buchanan. In 1928 he learned that a deficiency of one credit was going to prevent him from graduating. Rather than return for another year for that credit, he dropped out of school. Late in the 1920s he moved from Boston to New York and began working at the Lafayette Theatre in Harlem.

== Career ==
In 1933 Long performed in a production of Hot Chocolates, and he was featured at the Cotton Club in Harlem, singing "Brown Boy".

Long performed in a number of Broadway shows, including Porgy and Bess (as Sportin' Life in the 1942 revival), and Beggar's Holiday (1946). Long and Lena Horne co-introduced the Harold Arlen–Ted Koehler composition "As Long As I Live" in Cotton Club Parade (1934) when Horne was only 16 years old. In 1946 he was featured in the East Harlem Players' production The Pied Piper of Hamelin. A review in The New York Times said that Long was "wasted" in a 1945 production of Carib Song: "A fine singer and dancer, he gets one good song — "Woman Is a Rascal" — and not a great deal more."

He reprised his role of Sportin' Life in the 1951 Columbia recording of Porgy and Bess, the most complete recording of the opera issued up to that time. He also appeared with Thelma Carpenter in the 1952 revival of Shuffle Along, which was recorded by RCA Victor.

Don't Play Us Cheap opened at the Ethel Barrymore Theater in New York on May 16, 1972, and ran for 164 performances. Long, along with Thomas Anderson, Joshie Armstead, Robert Dunn, Jay Van Leer, Esther Rolle, Mabel King, George "Ooppee" McCurn, Frank Carey, Nate Barnett, and Rhetta Hughes, recreated their stage roles in the 1973 film adaptation of the musical.

Long originated the role of John in Bubbling Brown Sugar on Broadway, which opened at the August Wilson Theatre (then-ANTA Playhouse) on March 2, 1976, and closed on December 31, 1977, after 766 performances.

Long also appeared in a number of films and television shows. He performed a specialty number in Centennial Summer (1945). He played the elderly Chicken George Moore in Roots: The Next Generations miniseries, and had small roles in Trading Places (1983) – memorable as Ezra, the servant to whom Ralph Bellamy gives a miserably small Christmas bonus ("maybe I'll go to the movies – by myself"), The Sting (1973) ("Flat rate!"), and Harry and Tonto (1974). He was originally cast to play George Jefferson in "All in the Family", but was replaced based on negative feedback from Carroll O'Connor.

== Personal life and death ==
At the time of his death, Long was married to Gretchen Cotton. Together they had three daughters. His firstborn daughter died March 4, 1980. He died of cancer on February 15, 1984, in Columbia Presbyterian Medical Center, aged 73. At the time of his death he left behind his wife, Gretchen, two daughters, three sons-in-law and nine grandchildren.

== Filmography ==
Year	Title	Role	Notes
1945	Ziegfeld Follies	Specialty	scenes deleted
1946	Centennial Summer	Specialty	
1948	Romance on the High Seas	Specialty Singer	
1968	Finian's Rainbow	Passion Pilgrim Gospeleer	Uncredited
1973	The Sting	Benny Garfield	
1973	Don't Play Us Cheap	Brother Dave	
1974	Harry and Tonto	Leroy	
1978	Bye Bye Monkey	Miko	
1983	Trading Places	Ezra	
1984	Nothing Lasts Forever	Alphacruiser Steward	(final film role)
