= David McCord Lippincott =

American composer, lyricist, and novelist (1924–1984)

- Born: June 17, 1924; New York City, U.S.
- Died: January 1984 (aged 59)
- Education: Yale University
- Occupations: Composer; lyricist; novelist
- Years active: 1940s–1980s

David McCord Lippincott (June 17, 1924 – January 1984) was an American composer, lyricist, and novelist.

== Early life and education ==
Born in New York City, David McCord Lippincott wrote music and lyrics from an early age, the first evidence of which is a musical revue he wrote while attending the Hotchkiss School called Little Boy Blue. He then attended Yale University, as had his father, William Jackson Lippincott. He was a member of the Skull & Bones senior society, also like his father. He graduated in 1949.

While at Yale, Lippincott was a member of The Whiffenpoofs, an a cappella group. He wrote numerous light-hearted songs and revues, including "Daddy is a Yale Man" and "We're Saving Ourselves for Yale", both of which appeared in the show Button Button.

== Career ==
After college, Lippincott worked for McCann Erickson as a creative director, writing copy and creating jingles. His original album musical, The Body in the Seine, has become a collector's item.

During this time, he also wrote books, several of which are still available. Some of the writings were turned into films.

== Bibliography ==
- E Pluribus Bang! (1970)
- The Voice of Armageddon (1974)
- Tremor Violet (1975)
- The Blood of October (1978)
- Savage Ransom (1978)
- Salt Mine (1979)
- Dark Prism (1980) – published as Black Prism in the UK
- Unholy Mourning (1982)
- The Nursery (1983)
- The Home (1984)
