= Thomas Anderson (actor) =

American actor (1905–1996)

- Born: November 29, 1905; Pasadena, California
- Died: January 12, 1996 (aged 90); Englewood, New Jersey

Thomas Anderson (November 29, 1905 – January 12, 1996) was an American stage and television actor. He is best known for originating the role of Mr. Percy in the 1972 original Broadway production of Don't Play Us Cheap; a role he reprised in the 1973 film adaptation.

He was born on November 29, 1905, in Pasadena, California and died on January 12, 1996, in Englewood, New Jersey.

== Filmography ==
- East Side/West Side (1963) - TV series, episode "No Hiding Place"
- The Learning Tree (1969) - Pastor Broadnap
- The Legend of Nigger Charley (1972) - Shadow
- Shaft's Big Score! (1972) - Preacher
- Don't Play Us Cheap (1973) - Mr. Percy
- Benny's Place (1982) - Isaac
- South Bronx Heroes (1985) - Tony's Grandfather
