= Angel Man (G.A.) =

Single by Rhetta Hughes
- Released: 1983
- Genre: Dance, R&B
- Label: Aria
- Songwriter(s): Peter Tufel, Kenny Lehman
- Producer(s): Kenny Lehman

"Angel Man (G.A.)" is the title of a 1983 song released by American R&B singer Rhetta Hughes. The "G.A." in the title refers to the Guardian Angels, a crime-stopping volunteer organization known for the red berets their members often wear on their heads.

The song was co-written and produced by Kenny Lehman, a Broadway musical director with whom Hughes had previously worked. The song was popular in American dance clubs and discos in 1983, and spent one week at number one on the Billboard Hot Dance Club Play chart in April of that year. "Angel Man (G.A.)" did not make the Hot 100, but went to number 88 on the soul chart.

== See also ==
- List of number-one dance singles of 1983 (U.S.)
