= The Body in the Seine =

Soundtrack album
- Released: 1954
- Genre: Musical theatre
- Producer: David M. Lippincott

The Body in the Seine is an original "album musical" created by songwriter David M. Lippincott and given a limited release in 1954. Because of its rarity, many collectors of original cast albums consider it "the holy grail" of recordings.

Although The Body in the Seine (subtitled "A Musical Tour de Force Through Paris") sounds like the cast album of a Broadway musical, it actually was complete in itself, with no accompanying stage show. Lippincott, was working as a jingle writer (Coke, Fig Newton, etc.) at McCann-Erickson, a New York advertising agency, when he released this collection of twelve songs, hoping to find an experienced writer who would create a book to accompany his tunes. A note on the back of the album read: "Help Wanted. Musical score requires immediate services of bright, clever "book." Must be mature, sophisticated and willing to travel."

What makes The Body in the Seine interesting to collectors of Broadway cast albums is the theatrical performers assembled for the recording, including Alice Pearce, George S. Irving, Barbara Ashley and future U.S. Congressman, Jim Symington. The album's orchestrators, Joseph Glover and Ralph Norman Wilkinson, were both experienced music arrangers, and Buster Davis, who conducted the orchestra and chorus, had worked on such Broadway musicals as High Button Shoes, Gentlemen Prefer Blondes, Top Banana and Make a Wish.

== Track listing ==
1. Opening: See The World
2. A Lady Like You
3. Chacun à son Goût
4. You Really Didn't Have To Do That
5. But Wonderful
6. Love On The Left Bank's A Wild, Wild Thing
7. The Body in the Seine
8. A Little Change of Scene
9. Where Do I Go From Here?
10. Dirge
11. Why Can't You Be You?
12. Finale: What The Hell Is So Wide About the World?
