= Rock musical =

Musical theatre work with rock music

A rock musical is a musical theatre work with rock music. The genre of rock musical may overlap somewhat with album musicals, concept albums and song cycles, as they sometimes tell a story through the rock music, and some album musicals and concept albums become rock musicals. Notable examples of rock musicals include Next to Normal, Spring Awakening, Rent, Grease, and Hair. The Who's Tommy and other rock operas are sometimes presented on stage as a musical.

== History ==
The first musical to hint at what was to come was the final Ziegfeld Follies in 1957. This production featured one rock and roll number, "The Juvenile Delinquent", performed by fifty-year-old Billy De Wolfe. This was followed by another precursor to the rock musical, Bye Bye Birdie (1960), which included two rock and roll numbers.

The rock musical became an important part of the musical theatre scene in the late 1960s with the hit show Hair. Styled "The American Tribal Love-Rock Musical," the anti-war free-love hippie-themed, nude-scened Hair premiered in 1967 as the first production staged at The Public Theater. It moved to Broadway in October 1968. Your Own Thing also opened in 1968 and featured a gender-switching version of William Shakespeare's Twelfth Night.

Jesus Christ Superstar, composed by Andrew Lloyd Webber and Tim Rice, began as an album musical in 1970. The money made from album sales was used to fund the subsequent stage production in late 1971. This show and some other rock musicals that have no dialogue or are otherwise reminiscent of opera, with dramatic, emotional themes, are sometimes styled "rock operas". The musical Godspell (1971), had similar religious themes (albeit with a less controversial treatment) and pop/rock influences. The genre continued to develop through the 1970s with shows such as Grease and Pippin. The rock musical soon moved in other directions with shows like The Wiz, Raisin, Dreamgirls and Purlie, which were heavily influenced by R&B and soul music.

The rock musical declined in popularity through the 1980s. Except for a few outposts of rock, like Little Shop of Horrors (1982) and Chess (1986), audience tastes turned to shows with European pop scores, like Les Misérables and The Phantom of the Opera, as well as to more nostalgic fare. However, the rock musical achieved a renaissance in the 1990s, due in no small part to the popularity of Jonathan Larson's rock musical Rent (1996). This was followed by Off-Broadway rock musicals like Bat Boy: The Musical (1997) and Hedwig and the Angry Inch (1998), John Cameron Mitchell's Off-Broadway show about a transgender rocker. The end of the 1980s saw the beginning of a new form, jukebox musicals, such as Buddy – The Buddy Holly Story, Mamma Mia! and Jersey Boys, which feature the songs of a popular band, performer or genre.

The rock musical has seen a resurgence since the late 1990s, with shows by composers like Elton John (Aida, 1998), as well as a number of successful jukebox musicals with rock scores. More recent original rock musical productions include Spring Awakening (2007), Passing Strange and Bloody Bloody Andrew Jackson (both 2008), Rock of Ages and Next to Normal (both 2009), American Idiot (2010) and Jagged Little Pill (2019).

== Analysis ==
In 2010, critic Jon Pareles of The New York Times pointed out that all four of the musicals nominated for the Tony Award for Best Musical that year could be described as rock musicals. He analyzed the history and future of rock on Broadway:

Rock’s takeover of Broadway was not the revolution that had been feared – or anticipated – ever since Hair ... Broadway held out for many years as a bastion against youth culture. ... Rock’s Broadway invasion has been, instead, a lengthy campaign of attrition, via demographics, shifting tastes and musicians’ ambitions. Every few years another production [was] touted as finally bringing full-fledged rock to musical theater: Rent, Hedwig and the Angry Inch ... Spring Awakening. Very gradually rock musicians have stopped treating Broadway as an adversary – or a punch line. And for fans it has become one more entertainment option, as prices for arena shows reach Broadway levels.

Pareles commented, "rock has been transformed from nemesis to novelty to mainstay. ... Broadway productions can’t match the visceral impact – starting with volume – of a rock concert. (They try to make up for it with enthusiasm and slicker dancing.)" Another problem for rock musicals is that rock shows "still leave theatergoers complaining that the characters are hollow. ... [However,] Broadway does provide current rock two major incentives. As the artistic unit of the album has been shattered, down to a handful of shuffled MP3’s, musical theater offers a refuge for songwriters who want to tell longer stories, the way the songwriter Stew did in his autobiographical rock musical Passing Strange." Pareles also noted, "Broadway may be the final place in America, if not the known universe, where rock still registers as rebellious. In the decorous little jewel boxes that are Broadway’s theaters, raunch seems raunchier, and rock musicals flaunt four-letter words and lascivious simulations. ... There are, of course, commercial incentives. Broadway’s unbudgingly middle-aged audience is currently a generation that grew up on rock and R&B and generally feels more comfortable taking reserved seats in small theaters than plunging into the scrum of a standing-room club audience, or dealing with a rowdy arena mob."

Pareles attributed some of the new acceptance of rock as theatre to American Idol and its ilk, noting that some of the show's stars have moved to theatre. Also, "Rock’s old protestations of authenticity (versus Broadway contrivance) have been crumbling. As if glam rock in the ’70s and music video in the ’80s weren’t obvious enough in presenting rock as theater, pop’s video-era arena spectacles use the same technology as Las Vegas revues and Broadway shows." Another driver of rock's acceptance is its own entry into middle age, Pareles said, noting that "as rock’s history stretches out ever longer ... it offers just as much room for ... the familiarity and nostalgia that keep the jukebox musicals running. Still, Pareles concluded, "the last, crucial thrill of a rock performance – the unpredictability – stays just beyond Broadway’s reach. Two nights after the official opening of American Idiot, Green Day itself played an unannounced encore. The show had poured on its razzle-dazzle. .... But Green Day set off pandemonium. ... Green Day’s members may not be able to act or execute choreography ... but they also hold rock’s wild card: the potential, realized or not, for spontaneity."

== See also ==
- List of rock musicals
- Rock opera
