= Rhetta Hughes =

American actress and singer (1939–2019)

Rhetta Hughes (June 15, 1939 – June 3, 2019) was an American soul singer and musical theatre actress.

== Music and acting career ==
=== 1960s and before ===
Hughes was born in Dallas, Texas on June 15, 1939. Although Hughes sang from a young age into adulthood in the choir of a Baptist church in her hometown of Dallas, she had no aspirations to be a professional singer and had been employed for five years as a nurse at Parkland Memorial Hospital in 1963 when an impromptu vocal performance at the local club where her close friend Tennyson Stephens played piano caused the club's managers to hire her. Established as a top local lounge act, Hughes and Stephens were eventually spotted in a Dallas club by Al Williams - leader of the Four Step Brothers dance troupe - who signed as the duo's manager successfully transferring them to the Chicago nightclub circuit. In 1965 Hughes made her recording debut with an album focused on standards - which billed Hughes as Rheta Hughes and featured Tennyson Stephens - entitled Introducing An Electrifying New Star recorded with producer Ralph Bass for Columbia Records, who would release three singles by Hughes in 1967-68 all produced by Howard Roberts (Hughes' Columbia recording sessions all took place in New York City). Continuing to play nightclubs, Hughes was discovered by Bill Cosby who caught her act at the Redd Foxx Club in Los Angeles, with Hughes resultantly being signed to Tetragrammaton Records, the label Cosby had recently co-founded. After her label debut: "You're Doing It With Her - When It Should Be Me", almost reached the R&B Top 40 in the autumn of 1968, Hughes scored her career record with a mid-tempo R&B rendition of the Doors hit "Light My Fire" which reached #36 on the Billboard R&B chart in February 1969 with the track just falling short of the Billboard Hot 100 peaking at #102 on the "Bubbling Under..." chart (Record World, whose R&B chart afforded Hughes' "Light My Fire" a #26 peak, ranked the track in its 100 Top Pops singles chart with a peak of #78).

Hughes' two Tetragammraton singles were included on a 1969 album release entitled Re-Light My Fire from which two further singles were released without charting.

=== 1970s ===
Hughes had no further releases on Tetragammraton before the label folded in 1971 but was featured on the track "Mother's Prayer" on the 1971 album As Serious as a Heart-Attack by Melvin Van Peebles, with Hughes also accruing an impressive résumé as a session singer with her vocalizing on the 1974 #1 Roberta Flack hit "Feel Like Makin' Love" earning Hughes a gold record: Hughes session work résumé also includes the Van Dyke Parks album Discover America (1972), the Buffy Sainte-Marie album Moonshot (1972), the 1973 self-titled album by Brenda Patterson, the Bette Midler album Songs for the New Depression (1976), the 1976 self-titled album by Essra Mohawk and the Bobby Rydell album Born With a Smile (1976): a chorale member on the 1976 album Speak No Evil by Buddy Rich & the Big Band Machine, Hughes also vocalized on the track "The Circle" on the 1977 album Loading Zone (it) by guitarist Roy Buchanan.

In the early 1970s Hughes branched out into acting, her first evident credit being the 1971 blaxploitation film Sweet Sweetback's Baadasssss Song which was created by Melvin Van Peebles. Van Peebles next cast her as Earnestine in his 1972 musical Don't Play Us Cheap; a production which marked Hughes debut on Broadway at the Ethel Barrymore Theatre. The musical was subsequently adapted into a 1973 film with Rhetta reprising her role from the stage musical.

Hughes had her second Broadway tenure in the musical Don't Bother Me, I Can't Cope in which she impressed audience-member Harry Belafonte: subsequent to performing in Paul Sills' stage adaptation of Ovid's Metamorphoses at the 1973 Festival dei Due Mondi in Umbria Hughes was recruited by Belafonte to serve as second vocalist on his six-month North American tour in 1974, and then again on his eight-month global tour in 1976.

After some time away from performing tending her ailing mother in Dallas, Hughes led the national touring company of Bubbling Brown Sugar from July 1977 to May 1978: also in 1978 an uncredited Hughes was featured in the chorale for the 1978 film musical The Wiz. In March 1979 Hughes was cast as second lead in an upcoming Broadway show Got Tu Go Disco - highly touted as "the first disco musical" - with Hughes casting resulting in her being signed as a recording artist by disco-oriented Aria Productions whose leader Kenny Lehman was Got Tu...'s musical director/supervisor. Although Got Tu... would not noticeably last beyond its June 1979 opening Lehman would in fact produce Hughes' third album: Starpiece, released in 1980, which year also saw Hughes co-starring in the original off-Broadway musical Paris Lights as Josephine Baker.

=== 1980s ===
In 1981 Hughes co-starred in the Ford's Theater (D.C.) revival of the 1961 off-Broadway musical Black Nativity, performed in an off-Broadway revival of the musical Raisin mounted at the Equity Library Theatre, and play the second female lead Missy in a one-off staging of Purlie at the Lehman College Center for the Performing Arts taped for broadcast on Showtime. In 1982 - in a rare non-musical stage role - Hughes portrayed the maid in an all-black version of Long Day's Journey Into Night taped for the MT&R and broadcast by ABC-TV.

During a 1983 tenure in the Broadway hit musical Dreamgirls (as a chorus line member and understudy for the role of "Dreamgirl" Lorrell), Hughes was cast for the lead role in the upcoming Amen Corner, a highly touted new musical which - despite a promising "try-out" September engagement at Ford's Theater (D.C.) - would close less than five weeks subsequent to its inaugural November 1, 1983 preview, although Hughes performance would earn a Tony Award nomination in the category Best Actress in a Musical: Hughes, who had been featured on the cast album for the stage musical Don't Play Us Cheap, would be featured on the cast album recorded for Amen Corner. Also in 1983 Hughes recorded two dance tracks for Kenny Lehman's Aria Productions: "Angel Man (G.A.)" and "Crisis", which ranked on the Billboard Hot Dance Club Play chart with respective peaks of #1 and #20, with "Angel Man" becoming a minor R&B chart hit (#88). And Hughes would reprise her Black Nativity role when that musical was presented before Pope John Paul II in a December 23, 1983 performance in Vatican City. Hughes later stage musical résumé would include a 1984 off-Broadway revival of Take Me Along, a 1985 off-off-Broadway turn in the non-musical drama Long Time Since Yesterday, the 1987 national tour of Dreamgirls (reprising her Broadway role), and God's Trombones! a 1989 original off Broadway musical inspired by James Weldon Johnson's inspirational verse classic "God's Trombones": also Hughes participated in the Kool Jazz Festival's salute to Ethel Waters held at Avery Fisher Hall (UWS) June 27, 1985. In May 1988 Hughes appeared in the Fox Theater (Atlanta) premiere production Moms, supporting Clarice Taylor who portrayed Moms Mabley: the production would subsequently play engagements in Cleveland and Philadelphia. Hughes continued to accrue occasional screen credits with a co-starring role in the 1985 exploitation film Tenement and a supporting role in the mainstream but barely-released 1986 movie A Killing Affair, and also guest roles on the TV series Knightwatch and Law & Order in respectively 1988 and 1991.

=== 1990s and beyond ===
In the summer of 1991 Hughes accepted an offer to co-star as Josephine Baker's mother in a new Dutch stage musical whose director: Billy Wilson, had worked (as choreographer) with Hughes in the 1977-78 national tour of Bubbling Brown Sugar: Josephine: the Musical began its premiere run at the Luxor Theatre (Rotterdam) (nl) September 19, 1991 with subsequent engagements in other European venues. Hughes remained in the Netherlands for several years residing in Amsterdam and appearing in local musical stage productions including Bubbling Brown Sugar (1993) and the gospel music revue The Glory of Gospel (1996), being featured on the cast albums for the latter two productions as she had been with Josephine....

In 2008 Hughes returned to session singing for the album Subway Silence by Dutch vocalist Giovanca (nl).

== Personal life and death ==
In later years Hughes resided in Dallas. She died there on June 3, 2019, at the age of 79.
