= Lilly Done the Zampoughi Every Time I Pulled Her Coattail =

- A shot from the 2012 official video for the song

Single by Melvin Van Peebles

from the album Brer Soul
- Released: 1971
- Recorded: 1970, 1995, 2012
- Genre: spoken word, funk
- Songwriter: Melvin Van Peebles

"Lilly Done the Zampoughi Every Time I Pulled Her Coattail" is a song written by Melvin Van Peebles.

"Lilly" was originally released on Van Peebles' album Brer Soul. It was released as a single in 1971.

The song is told from the point of view of a death row inmate who recalls how Lilly would do the Zampoughi every time he pulled her coattails. It is eventually revealed that he killed her because she would do the Zampoughi when any other guy pulled her coattails as well.

What could the judge have understood about Lilly doing the Zampoughi.. every time somebody pulled her coattails?

Van Peebles was inspired to write the song by an encounter in New York City.

'Lilly' was taken from a girl I knew who was always so quiet, 'til one day we wind up in the Gramercy Hotel doing the funky monkey, and she leaps up in the middle of the bed and starts dancing!

The song was featured in Van Peebles' musical Ain't Supposed to Die a Natural Death, during which a dancer performed on stage as Lilly's ghost. The song featured on the album release for the musical. The Village Voice described the song as 'perhaps the most disturbing', describing the revival performance of the play by the Classical Theatre of Harlem.

Van Peebles recorded another version of it in 1995 for Ghetto Gothic which features Spaceman Patterson. He explains that the earlier version lacks the newer version's "fuller musicality". He revisited the earlier version of the song in 1998 with the band Roadkill.

On November 10, 2012, Van Peebles announced the release of a new video for the song via the Facebook page for Melvin Van Peebles wid Laxative using the version he recorded for the unreleased album Nahh... Nahh Mofo. The video features performances from Zebulon Cafe Concert, and was co-edited by Van Peebles and Alex Lozupone.
