= Love, That's America =

"Love, That's America" is a song written by Melvin Van Peebles in 1970 for his film Watermelon Man. He re-recorded it for his 1971 album As Serious as a Heart-Attack. In 2011, the song became associated with the Occupy Wall Street movement due to being used on videos featuring footage from the movement.

== Song development ==
The song was written by Van Peebles for his only Hollywood production, Watermelon Man. Van Peebles wrote the soundtrack himself, in order to have creative control. The song is narrated from the point of view of someone walking around America, and seeing "people run through the streets, blood streaming from where they been beat", and declaring "naw, this ain't America, you can't fool me".

In 1970, the song was released as a single, and mentioned as a top pick in Billboard's Oct 31, 1970 issue.

== Video ==

The first video featuring video from Occupy Wall Street (mostly involving police brutality) and the audio from the song was uploaded to YouTube on October 26, 2011, which was quickly endorsed via Van Peebles' Facebook page and mentioned in several blogs. On November 8, this video was presented at an Occupy Wall Street benefit at Zebulon Cafe Concert in Brooklyn.

In mid-November, several other videos featuring footage associated with Occupy Wall Street and the audio from the song were also uploaded, which have been featured in many blogs. None of these videos were created by Van Peebles, despite the claims made on some blogs, but he did endorse the making of these videos. On November 18, Newsday published an interview with Van Peebles from November 7, which discussed the original video as well as the fact that it has "gone viral".

On December 5, 2011, Turkish newspaper Radikal described it as the surprising unofficial anthem of the movement, and mentions three YouTube videos that use the song in connection with the movement. On January 17, 2012, Van Peebles played the Players' Club to honor the fact that the song has become a theme for the Occupy Wall Street movement.

On February 22, 2012, Van Peebles commented further, "When I found out that the song had been co-opted by Occupy Wall Street, my jaw dropped. It went viral online. People were remixing it and mashing it up with videos from the protests. The time I wrote it was a time of social upheaval — the Stonewall Riots had just happened. Forty years later, the same thing was going down in the streets of New York City."
