= Don't Play Us Cheap =

1970 musical by Melvin Van Peebles

- Music: Melvin Van Peebles
- Lyrics: Melvin Van Peebles
- Book: Melvin Van Peebles
- Basis: La fête à Harlem (1967)
- Premiere: November 1970: San Francisco State College

Don't Play Us Cheap is a musical play with music, lyrics, and a musical book by Melvin Van Peebles. The musical is based on Van Peebles' 1967 French-language novel La fête à Harlem (1967). Set in Harlem, the musical premiered in November 1970 at San Francisco State College.

The musical was staged on Broadway at the Ethel Barrymore Theatre in 1972; making its New York City debut at that theatre on May 16 of that year where it ran for a total of 164 performances; closing on September 30, 1972. Staged by Van Peebles, the production used scenic designs by Kert F. Lundell, costume designs by Bernard Johnson, and lighting designs by Martin Aronstein. The original cast included Esther Rolle as Miss Maybell, Thomas Anderson as Mr. Percy, Rhetta Hughes as Earnestine, Avon Long as Brother Dave, Mabel King as Mrs. Bower, and Joshie Jo Armstead as Mrs. Washington.

The musical was adapted into a 1973 film of the same name. The film features much of the same cast as the Broadway production; and the film, although released after the Broadway run, was made prior to the Broadway production in 1971.

== Awards ==
The musical was nominated for two Tony Awards at the 27th Tony Awards; Van Peebles for the Tony Award for Best Book of a Musical and Avon Long for the Tony Award for Best Featured Actor in a Musical.
