= Sweet Sweetback's Baadasssss Song =

1971 blaxploitation film by Melvin Van Peebles

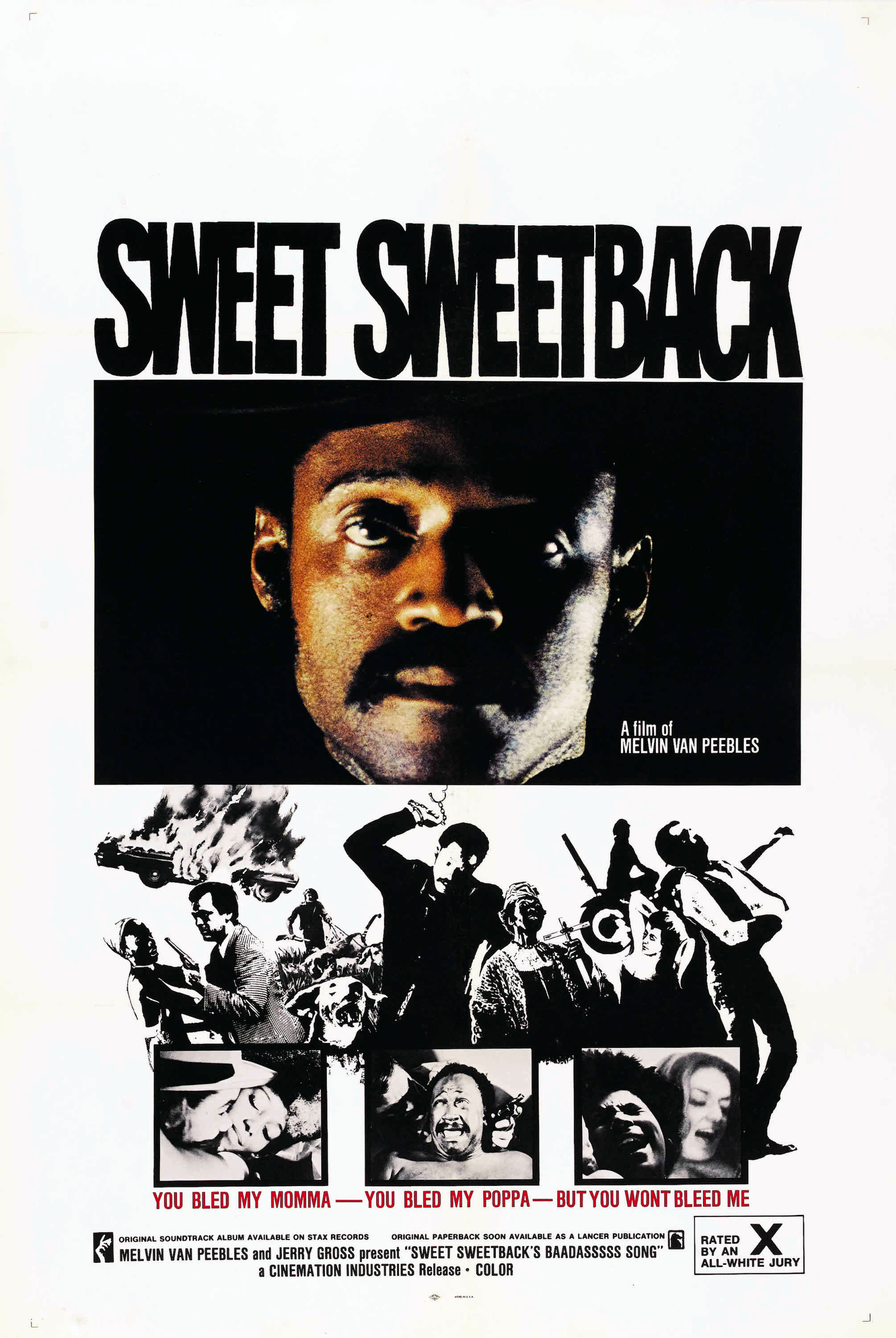
- Theatrical release poster
- Directed by: Melvin Van Peebles
- Written by: Melvin Van Peebles
- Produced by: Melvin Van Peebles; Jerry Gross
- Starring: Melvin Van Peebles
- Cinematography: Bob Maxwell
- Edited by: Melvin Van Peebles
- Music by: Melvin Van Peebles; Earth, Wind & Fire
- Production companies: Yeah, Inc.
- Distributed by: Cinemation Industries
- Release date: March 31, 1971 (Detroit)
- Running time: 97 minutes
- Country: United States
- Language: English
- Budget: $150,000
- Box office: $15.2 million

Sweet Sweetback's Baadasssss Song is a 1971 American independent blaxploitation action thriller film written, co-produced, scored, edited, directed by, and starring Melvin Van Peebles. His son Mario Van Peebles also appears in a small role, playing the title character as a young boy. The film tells the picaresque story of a poor black man fleeing from the white police authorities.

Van Peebles began to develop the film after being offered a three-picture contract for Columbia Pictures. No studio would finance the film, so Van Peebles funded it himself, shooting it independently over 19 days, performing all of his own stunts and appearing in several sex scenes, some reportedly unsimulated. He received a $50,000 loan from Bill Cosby to complete the project. The film's fast-paced montages and jump-cuts were unique features in American cinema at the time. The picture was censored in some markets, and received mixed reviews. However, it has left a lasting impression on American cinema.

The musical score of Sweet Sweetback's Baadasssss Song was performed by Earth, Wind & Fire. Van Peebles did not have money for traditional advertising methods, so he released the soundtrack album prior to the film's release in order to generate publicity. Initially, the film was screened in only two theaters in the United States (in Atlanta and Detroit). It went on to gross $15.2 million at the box office. Huey P. Newton celebrated and welcomed the film's revolutionary implications, and Sweetback became required viewing for members of the Black Panther Party. According to Variety, it demonstrated to Hollywood that films which portrayed "militant" Blacks could be highly profitable, leading to the creation of the blaxploitation genre, although critic Roger Ebert did not consider this example of Van Peebles' work to be an exploitation film.

In 2020, the film was selected for preservation in the United States National Film Registry by the Library of Congress as being "culturally, historically, or aesthetically significant".

== Plot ==
A young African-American orphan is sheltered by a Los Angeles brothel in the 1940s. Working as a towel boy, he is seduced by one of the prostitutes. The women name him "Sweet Sweetback" in honor of his sexual prowess and large penis. As an adult, Sweetback performs in the whorehouse sex show.

One night, two white LAPD officers come in to speak to Sweetback's boss, Beetle. A black man has been murdered, and there is pressure from the black community to bring in a suspect. The police suggest arresting Sweetback to appease their superiors, blame him for the crime, and then release him a few days later for lack of evidence. Beetle agrees, and they arrest Sweetback. On the way to the police station, the officers also arrest a young Black Panther named Mu-Mu after some trouble. They handcuff him to Sweetback, but when Mu-Mu insults the officers, they take both men out of the car, undo the handcuff from Mu-Mu, and beat him. In response, Sweetback fashions his handcuffs into brass knuckles and beats the officers, putting them into comas.

Sweetback returns to the whorehouse for help, but Beetle refuses out of fear of being arrested himself. As Sweetback leaves, he is arrested and beaten by order of the police chief, seeking information about Mu-Mu's whereabouts, but escapes when a black revolutionary throws a Molotov cocktail at the police car transporting him to the station for more severe interrogation. He next visits an old girlfriend, who similarly refuses him aid but cuts his handcuffs off in exchange for sex. Sweetback then asks his priest for help, but he refuses for fear of the police shutting down the church's drug rehab center.

Police officers interrogate Beetle, seeking to discover Sweetback's whereabouts, rendering him deaf by firing a gun against each ear. Sweetback meets up with Mu-Mu and black gangsters drive them through South Central Los Angeles to the outskirts. Stopping overnight at a seemingly abandoned building, they discover it is a safe house for the Hells Angels. Their helmeted president challenges Sweetback to a duel: asked to decide the weapon and discovering she is a woman, he chooses sex and is judged to win.

The bikers leave the men in their club to await a member of the all black East Bay Dragons who will get them to Mexico. During the night, the club is raided by two policemen with drawn guns. Sweetback resists arrest and kills both officers in self-defense, but Mu-Mu is badly wounded. The next morning, the Dragon arrives, but his motorcycle can only carry one; Sweetback asks him to take Mu-Mu, as the activist is their future.

As Sweetback and Mu-Mu continue to evade arrest, pressure mounts on the police; the police chief warns his staff that the fugitives' example could prompt a black uprising. The police badly beat up a black man sleeping with a white woman, believing him to be probably one of the fugitives, and that he deserves a beating in any case. Later, Beetle, now in a wheelchair following the police brutality, is brought to the morgue to identify a body believed to be Sweetback and smiles when he sees it is someone else. As the police trawl black areas for him, they find Sweetback's biological and rather confused mother, who reveals that his birth name is Leroy.

Sweetback pays a hippie to switch clothes with him, deceiving a police helicopter which sends a patrol car in pursuit. Sweetback was also wounded in the shootout and both stows away and hitches rides on trucks and a train heading south. Running through arid country, he survives by drinking from a puddle and eating a lizard. When police hear he might be at a rural hippie musical event, he successfully disguises himself by simulating sex in the bushes. He is later spotted and police borrow a farmer's hunting dogs to track him. Realizing he will cross the border before they reach him, a policeman releases the dogs, expecting them to catch and kill him. However, at the Tijuana River, Sweetback stabs the dogs and escapes into Mexico, swearing to return to "collect some dues".

== Cast ==
- Melvin Van Peebles as Sweetback
  - Mario Peebles as Young Sweetback / Kid
- Hubert Scales as Mu-Mu
- Simon Chuckster as "Beetle"
- John Dullaghan as Commissioner
- West Gale
- Niva Rochelle
- Rhetta Hughes as Old Girl Friend
- Nick Ferrari
- Ed Rue
- Johnny Amos as Biker
- Lavelle Roby
- Ted Hayden

== Production ==
=== Pre-production ===
During production on Watermelon Man for Columbia Pictures, Van Peebles attempted to rewrite the script in order to change it from a comedy poking fun at white liberals into the first black power film. The writer, Herman Raucher, who had based the script on friends of his who expressed liberal sentiments while still holding onto bigoted beliefs, objected to Van Peebles' efforts because he felt that the movie should be a parody of liberal culture. Raucher ultimately exercised a clause in his contract that allowed him to novelize his own script, effectively preventing Peebles from too radically changing the film.

After Watermelon Man proved to be a financial success, Van Peebles was offered a three-picture contract. While the deal was still up in the air, Van Peebles—still wanting to create the first black power film—developed the story for Sweet Sweetback's Baadasssss Song. The initial idea for the film did not come clearly to him at first. One day, Van Peebles drove into the Mojave Desert, turned off the highway, and drove over the rise of a hill. He parked the car, got out, and squatted down facing the sun. He decided that the film was going to be "about a brother getting the Man's foot out of his ass."

Because no studio would finance the film, Van Peebles put his own money into the production, and shot it independently. Van Peebles was given a $50,000 loan by Bill Cosby to complete the film. "Cosby didn't want an equity part," according to Van Peebles. "He just wanted his money back." Van Peebles wound up with controlling ownership of the film. Several actors auditioned for the lead role of Sweetback, but told Van Peebles that they would not do the film unless they were given more dialogue. Van Peebles ended up playing the part himself.

=== Filming ===
According to Van Peebles, during the first day of shooting, director of photography and head cameraman Bob Maxwell told him he could not mix two different shades of mechanical film lights, because he believed the results would not appear well on film. Van Peebles told him to do it anyway. When he saw the rushes, Maxwell was overjoyed, and Van Peebles did not encounter that issue again during the shoot. Van Peebles shot the film over a relatively short period of 19 days in order to reduce the possibility of the cast, most of whom were amateurs, showing on some days with haircuts or clothes different from the prior day. He shot the film in what he referred to as "globs," where he would shoot entire sequences at a time.

Because Van Peebles could not afford a stunt man, he performed all of the stunts himself, which also included appearing in several unsimulated sex scenes. At one point in the shoot, Van Peebles was forced to jump off a bridge. Bob Maxwell later stated, "Well, that's great, Mel, but let's do it again." Van Peebles ended up performing the stunt nine times. Van Peebles contracted gonorrhea when filming one of the many sex scenes, and successfully applied to the Directors Guild in order to get workers' compensation because he was "hurt on the job". Van Peebles used the money to purchase more film.

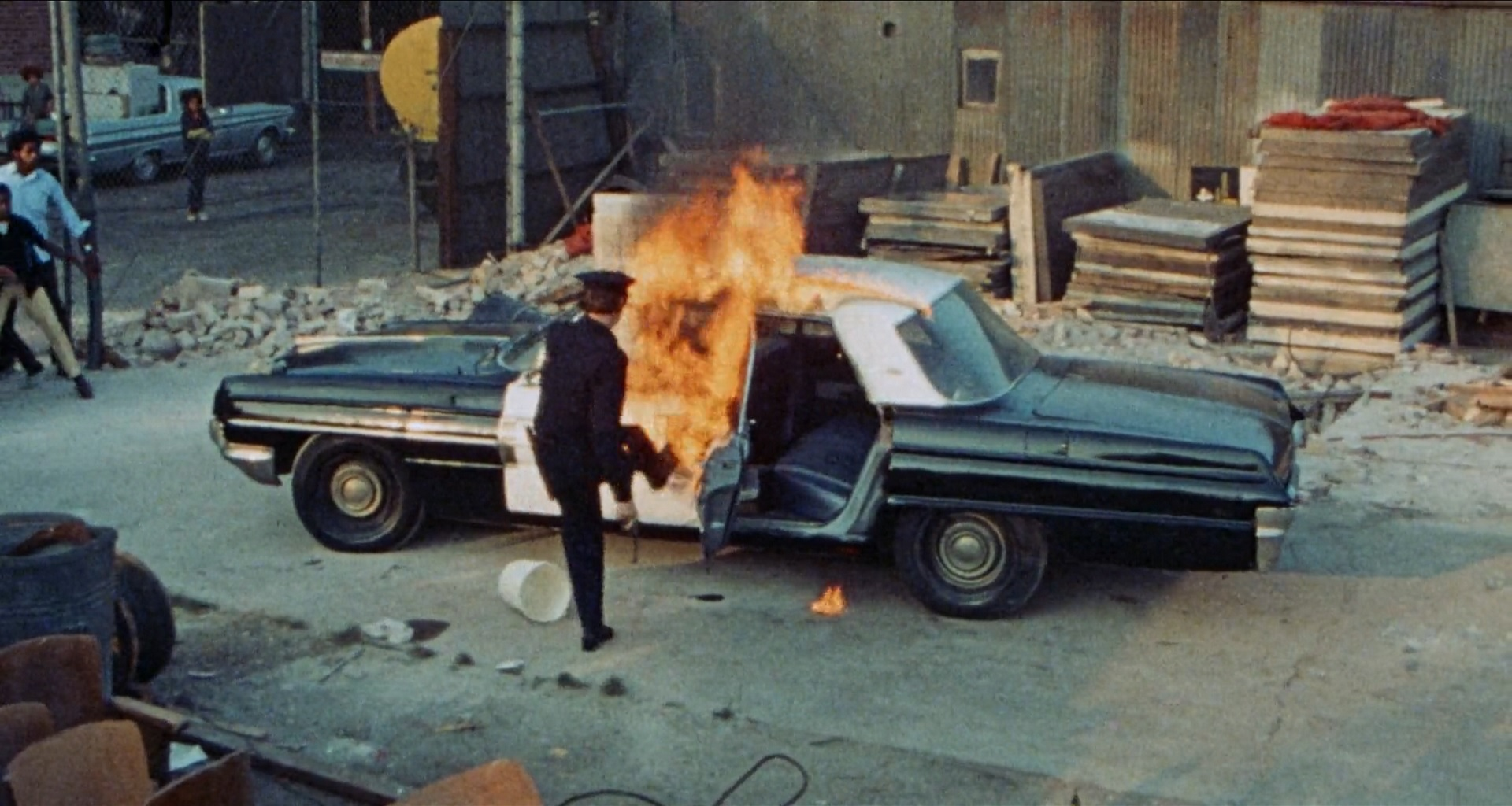
When filming the car fire scene, an actual fire truck showed up on location and was included in the final cut of the film. Screenshot from the trailer.

Van Peebles and several key crew members were armed because it was dangerous to attempt to create a film without the support of the union. One day, Van Peebles looked for his gun, and failed to find it. Van Peebles found out that someone had put it in the prop box. When they filmed the scene in which Beetle is interrogated by police, who fire a gun next to both of his ears, it was feared that the real gun would be picked up instead of the prop.

While shooting a sequence with members of the Hells Angels, one of the bikers told Van Peebles they wanted to leave; Van Peebles responded by telling them they were paid to stay until the scene was over. The biker took out a knife and started cleaning his fingernails with it. In response, Van Peebles snapped his fingers, and his crew members were standing there with rifles. The bikers stayed to shoot the scene.

Van Peebles had received a permit to set a car on fire, but had done so on a Friday; as a result, there was no time to have it filed before shooting the scene. When the scene was shot, a fire truck showed up. This ended up in the final cut of the film.

According to Van Peebles, the dead dogs seen in the film's final scenes were sourced from a humane society: "Boy, were we lucky... At first, the society didn't even think it could help us... but after a little donation, they looked in their refrigerator again, I guess, and found almost exactly what we were looking for..."

=== Directing ===
Van Peebles stated that he approached directing the film "like you do the cupboard when you're broke and hungry: throw in everything eatable and hope to come out on top with the seasoning, i.e., by editing". Van Peebles stated that "story-wise, I came up with an idea, why not the direct approach. ... To avoid putting myself into a corner and writing something I wouldn't be able to shoot, I made a list of the givens in the situation and tried to take those givens and juggle them into the final scenario."

Van Peebles wanted "a victorious film ... where niggers could walk out standing tall instead of avoiding each other's eyes, looking once again like they'd had it". Van Peebles was aware of the fact that films produced by major studios would appear to be more polished than low-budget independently made features, and was determined to make a film that "[looked] as good as anything one of the major studios could turn out".

Van Peebles knew that in order to spread his message, the film "simply couldn't be a didactic discourse which would end up playing ... to an empty theater except for ten or twenty aware brothers who would pat me on the back and say it tells it like it is" and that "to attract the mass we have to produce work that not only instructs but entertains". Van Peebles also wanted to make a film that would "be able to sustain itself as a viable commercial product ... [The Man] ain't about to go carrying no messages for you, especially a relevant one, for free."

Van Peebles wanted half of his shooting crew "to be third world people. ... So at best a staggering amount of my crew would be relatively inexperienced. ... Any type of film requiring an enormous technical sophistication at the shooting stage should not be attempted." Van Peebles knew that gaining financing for the film would not be easy and expected "a great deal of animosity from the film media (white in the first place and right wing in the second) at all levels of filmmaking", thus he had to "write a flexible script where emphasis could be shifted. In short, stay loose."

=== Editing ===
The film's fast-paced montages and jump cuts were novel features for an American movie at the time. Stephen Holden from The New York Times commented that the film's editing had "a jazzy, improvisational quality, and the screen is often streaked with jarring psychedelic effects that illustrate Sweetback's alienation". In The 50 Most Influential Black Films: A Celebration of African-American Talent, Determination, and Creativity, author S. Torriano Berry writes that the film's "odd camera angles, superimpositions, reverse-key effects, box and matting effects, rack-focus shots, extreme zooms, stop-motion and step-printing, and an abundance of jittery handheld camera work all helped to express the paranoid nightmare that [Sweetback's] life had become".

=== Music ===
Since Van Peebles did not have the money to hire a composer, he composed the film's music score himself. Because he did not know how to read or write music, he numbered all of the keys on a piano so he could remember the melodies. Van Peebles stated that "Most filmmakers look at a feature in terms of image and story or vice versa. Effects and music [...] are strictly secondary considerations. Very few look at film with sound considered as a creative third dimension. So I calculate the scenario in such a way that sound can be used as an integral part of the film."

The film's music was performed by the then-unknown group Earth, Wind & Fire, who were living in a single apartment with hardly any food at the time. Van Peebles' secretary was dating one of the bandmembers, and convinced him to contact them about performing the music for the film. Van Peebles projected scenes from the film as the band performed the music. By alternating hymn-based vocalization and jazz rhythms, Van Peebles created a sound that foreshadowed the use of sampling in hip hop music.

Van Peebles recalls that "music was not used as a selling tool in movies at the time. Even musicals, it would take three months after the release of the movie before they would bring out an album." Because Van Peebles did not have any money for traditional advertising methods, he decided that by releasing a soundtrack album in anticipation of the film's release, he could help build awareness for the film with its music.

== Release ==
The film's original trailer.

Sweet Sweetback's Baadasssss Song was released on March 31, 1971, at the Grand Circus Theatre in Detroit and on April 2, 1971, at the Coronet Theatre in Atlanta. Melvin Van Peebles stated that "at first, only two theaters in the United States would show the picture: one in Detroit, and one in Atlanta. The first night in Detroit, it broke all the theater's records, and that was only on the strength of the title alone, since nobody had seen it yet. By the second day, people would take their lunch and sit through it three times. I knew that I was finally talking to my audience. Sweet Sweetback's Baadasssss Song made thousands of dollars in its first day." It grossed $70,000 in its first week in Detroit.

The film earned $4.1 million in rentals in the US and Canada, and went on to gross over $15 million at the box office.

=== Censorship ===
After the film received an X rating from the Motion Picture Association of America, which inspired the advertising tagline "Rated X by an all-white jury", (Note: The MPAA would re-rate the film R in 1974.) distributors and exhibitors (including the Music Hall theater in Boston) removed nine minutes. Van Peebles stated, "Should the rest of the community submit to your censorship that is its business, but White standards shall no longer be imposed on the Black community."

The film was banned in Australia after it was submitted to the country's censors in September 1971 (two months before the country's ratings system was liberalized with the introduction of the R rating) over concerns that its content was violent and indecent. In 1980, the film was appended an R rating precisely one day before it was due to be screened in South Australia at the Adelaide International Film Festival. However, on the same day, the film was banned by that state's Attorney General at the time, Trevor Griffin, on the basis of the opening scenes that featured Mario Van Peebles, which he deemed to be a violation of the Child Pornography provision of the state's criminal law. The decision to ban the film from the festival was controversial in the state, leading to the resignation of three of the festival's cabinet members and the cancellation of the festival itself until it was revived in 2003. It has never been resubmitted to the Australian censor, but it aired on one of the country's television networks, SBS, on October 14, 1992.

The Region 2 DVD release from BFI Video alters the opening sex sequences. A notice at the beginning of the DVD states "In order to comply with UK law (the Protection of Children Act 1978), a number of images in the opening sequence of this film have been obscured."

== Reception ==
=== Critical response ===
Critical response was mixed. Kevin Thomas in the Los Angeles Times described the film as "a series of stark, earthy vignettes, Van Peebles evokes the vitality, humor, pain, despair and omnipresent fear that is life for so many African-Americans". Stephen Holden in The New York Times called it "an innovative, yet politically inflammatory film". The film website Rotten Tomatoes, which compiles reviews from a wide range of critics, gives the film a score of 73% "Fresh" from 30 reviews. The end of the film was shocking to Black viewers who had expected that Sweetback would perish at the hands of the police—a common, even inevitable, fate of Black men "on the run" in prior films. Film critic Roger Ebert cited the ending as a reason for the film not to be labeled as an exploitation film.

The New York Times critic Clayton Riley viewed the film favorably, commenting on its aesthetic innovation, but stated of the character of Sweetback that he "is the ultimate sexualist in whose seemingly vacant eyes and unrevealing mouth are written the protocols of American domestic colonialism". In another review, Riley explained that "Sweetback, the profane sexual athlete and fugitive, is based on a reality that is Black. We may not want him to exist but he does." Critic Donald Bogle states in a New York Times interview that the film in some ways met the Black audience's compensatory needs after years of asexual, Sidney Poitier-type characters and that they wanted a "viable, sexual, assertive, arrogant black male hero".

In a compendium about the Museum of Modern Art's film and media collection, curator Steven Higgins describes the film's place in history: "Not since Oscar Micheaux had an African-American filmmaker taken such complete control of the creative process, turning out a work so deeply connected to his own personal and cultural reality that he was not surprised when the white critical establishment professed bewilderment...[it] depends less on its story of a superstud running from the police than it does on its disinterest in referencing white culture and its radically new understanding of how style and substance inform each other."

Metroactive's Nicky Baxter's response is mixed: "Sweet Sweetback introduced the biggest and baddest buck of the [blaxploitation era]. Warts and all, the film is perhaps the closest analogy to the progressive aims of the then-flourishing Black Arts movement. Indeed, it can be argued that because it was written, produced and directed by an American-born African outside of Hollywood, the film is not truly part of the blaxploitation genre, yet it cannot be denied that it shares certain thematic similarities. The film works best when it follows Sweetback's odyssey from stud boy to proto-nationalist consciousness. Unlike the Horatio Alger-style integrationism propagated in past films about blacks, here we see an outlaw among outlaws, nourished by a community segregated from the mainstream. It is in this disenfranchised community—and not the sterile offices of the NAACP—that he seeks and finds refuge. The sordid sexual trysts, the faux fantasies in the desert are, finally, less interesting than Sweetback's quest for self-realization."

=== Notable reactions ===
Huey P. Newton, devoting an entire issue of The Black Panther to the film's revolutionary implications, celebrated and welcomed the film as "the first truly revolutionary Black film made [...] presented to us by a Black man." Newton wrote that Sweetback "presents the need for unity among all members and institutions within the community of victims," contending that this is evidenced by the opening credits which state the film stars "The Black Community," a collective protagonist engaged in various acts of community solidarity that aid Sweetback in escaping. Newton further argued that "the film demonstrates the importance of unity and love between Black men and women," as demonstrated "in the scene where the woman makes love to the young boy but in fact baptizes him into his true manhood". The film became required viewing for members of the Black Panther Party.

A few months after the publication of Newton's article, historian Lerone Bennett Jr. responded with an essay on the film in Ebony, titled "The Emancipation Orgasm: Sweetback in Wonderland," in which he discussed the film's "black aesthetic". Bennett argued that the film romanticized the poverty and misery of the ghetto and that "some men foolishly identify the black aesthetic with empty bellies and big bottomed prostitutes." Bennett concluded that the film is "neither revolutionary nor black because it presents the spectator with sterile daydreams and a superhero who is ahistorical, selfishly individualist with no revolutionary program, who acts out of panic and desperation." Bennett described Sweetback's sexual initiation at ten years old as the "rape of a child by a 40-year-old prostitute".

Bennett described instances when Sweetback saved himself through the use of his sexual prowess as "emancipation orgasms" and stated that "it is necessary to say frankly that nobody ever fucked his way to freedom. And it is mischievous and reactionary finally for anyone to suggest to black people in 1971 that they are going to be able to screw their way across the Red Sea. Fucking will not set you free. If fucking freed, black people would have celebrated the millennium 400 years ago." Poet and author Haki R. Madhubuti (then known as Don L. Lee) agreed with Bennett's assessment of the film, stating that it was "a limited, money-making, auto-biographical fantasy of the odyssey of one Melvin Van Peebles through what he considered to be the Black community."

== Legacy ==
Sweet Sweetback's Baadasssss Song is considered to be an important film in the history of African-American cinema. The film was credited by Variety as leading to the creation of the blaxploitation genre, largely consisting of exploitation films made by white directors. As Spike Lee states, "Sweet Sweetback's Baadasssss Song gave us all the answers we needed. This was an example of how to make a film (a real movie), distribute it yourself, and most important, get paid. Without Sweetback who knows if there could have been a [...] She's Gotta Have It, Hollywood Shuffle, or House Party?"

Robert Reid-Pharr wrote that "...[Sweetback] was seen (correctly I believe) as the first in a long line of so-called Blaxploitation features..." and goes on to say that Van Peebles was "one of the first artists to bring not only compelling but realistic images of Black Americans into mainstream cinemas, breaking with decades-long traditions ..."

After Sweetback, Van Peebles made a film adaptation of his Broadway show Don't Play Us Cheap in 1973 and took part in the writing of the 1977 film Greased Lightning, starring Richard Pryor. After that, he worked mainly on Broadway due to Hollywood's reluctance to hire him and couldn't direct another film until Identity Crisis in 1989. He later stated that "Hollywood took my formula, reduced the concept of négritude to a flamboyant caricature and reversed the political message, turning it into a counter-revolutionary one."

By 1986, Van Peebles had plans for a Sweetback trilogy, with the second installment having the protagonist recruited by a group of American businessmen who want him back in the States to rid their neighborhood of drug dealers. Melvin reprised the role of Sweetback for the comedy film The Hebrew Hammer in 2003 and became involved in a musical adaptation of the film in 2009.

In 2004, Mario Van Peebles directed and starred as his father in Baadasssss!, a biopic about the making of Sweet Sweetback. The film was a critical but not commercial success.

In a 2019 reference book published by the Museum of Modern Art to commemorate key works of art in its collection, Anne Morra, Associate Curator of the department of film, says Sweetback's importance goes beyond the history of filmmaking and that its impact on "social consciousness, culture, and political discourse remains indisputable".

== See also ==
- List of American films of 1971
- List of cult films
