= Watermelon Man (film) =

1970 film by Melvin Van Peebles

- Theatrical release poster
- Directed by: Melvin Van Peebles
- Written by: Herman Raucher
- Produced by: John B. Bennett
- Starring: Godfrey Cambridge; Estelle Parsons
- Cinematography: W. Wallace Kelley
- Edited by: Carl Kress
- Music by: Melvin Van Peebles
- Distributed by: Columbia Pictures
- Release date: May 27, 1970
- Running time: 98 minutes
- Country: United States
- Language: English
- Box office: $1.1 million (US/Canada rentals)

Watermelon Man is a 1970 American satirical comedy film directed by Melvin Van Peebles and starring Godfrey Cambridge, Estelle Parsons, Howard Caine, D'Urville Martin, Kay Kimberley, Mantan Moreland, and Erin Moran. Written by Herman Raucher, it tells the story of an extremely bigoted white insurance salesman named Jeff Gerber, who wakes up one morning to find that he has become black. The premise for the film was inspired by Franz Kafka's Metamorphosis and by John Howard Griffin's autobiographical Black Like Me.

Van Peebles' only studio film, Watermelon Man was a financial success, but Van Peebles did not accept Columbia Pictures' three-picture contract, instead developing the independent film Sweet Sweetback's Baadasssss Song. The music for Watermelon Man, written and performed by Van Peebles, was released on a soundtrack album, which spawned the single "Love, That's America".

== Plot ==
In 1970, Insurance salesman Jeff Gerber lives in an all-white suburban neighborhood with his liberal-minded housewife Althea, who tolerates her husband's character flaws out of love. Every morning when Jeff wakes up, he spends some time under a tanning machine, hits the speedbag, drinks a health drink, and races the bus to work on foot. He presents himself as happy-go-lucky and quite a joker, but others tend to see him as obnoxious and boorish. Althea, who watches the race riots every night on TV with great interest, chastises Jeff for not having sympathy for the problems of black Americans.

One morning, Jeff wakes up to find that he has turned black. He tries to fall back asleep, thinking that it is a dream, but to no avail. As he tries to wash the color off, Althea walks into the bathroom and screams. He explains to her that the "Negro in the bathroom" is him. He initially believes this to be the result of spending too much time under the tanning machine. He spends almost the entire day at home, afraid to go out of the house, only going out once to venture into the "colored part of town" to buy lightening creams. His attempts to change his skin color fail.

The next day Althea persuades Jeff to go to work. As he runs through the neighborhood to catch the bus, the neighbors assume that he is a thief and panic until the black bus driver vouches for him. During his lunch break, he visits his doctor who cannot explain Jeff's condition either. Jeff's boss suggests that they could drum up extra business with a "Negro" salesman and reassigns him to deal only with black customers. Althea receives harassing phone calls all day demanding that Jeff move out. Although she loves Jeff, she struggles to cope with the situation.

At work the following day Erica, the office's German secretary, makes several advances. His doctor gives up and suggests that he might do better with a black doctor. He tries to advise black customer leads in earnest, but his boss is unsatisfied and insists that he use hard-sell tactics. He visits the employment office, where a counselor reviews his history and recommends him for a garbage dump job. Returning home, Jeff finds neighbors waiting. They offer him $50,000 to move out for the sake of their own property values, and he bids them up to $100,000.

Althea sends the children to live with her sister and later leaves her husband. Jeff sleeps with Erica but is repelled by her objectification of him afterward. He moves into an apartment and uses the money from the home sale to start his own insurance business. Finally accepting that he is black, he quits his usual exercise routine and takes up martial arts with a group of black men.

== Cast ==
- Godfrey Cambridge as Jeff Gerber
- Estelle Parsons as Althea Gerber
- Howard Caine as Mr. Townsend
- D'Urville Martin as Bus Driver
- Mantan Moreland as Counterman
- Kay Kimberley as Erica
- Kay E. Kuter as Dr. Wainwright
- Scott Garrett as Burton Gerber
- Erin Moran as Janice Gerber
- Irving Selbst as Mr. Johnson
- Emil Sitka as Delivery Man
- Karl Lukas as Policeman #2

Songwriter and then-burgeoning actor Paul Williams appears as the job counselor. Van Peebles has a short cameo as a sign painter putting Jeff's name on his new office door.

== Production ==
Herman Raucher wrote the script on spec in 1969, after realizing that several of his friends who espoused liberal sympathies still admitted to holding on to racist ideologies. Columbia Pictures liked the idea but were afraid to make the film without a black director; they hired Van Peebles based on his film Story of a Three Day Pass.

Godfrey Cambridge plays the role of Jeff Gerber in whiteface for the first few minutes of the film, and then goes without the makeup when his character changes into a black man. Before Van Peebles had come into the project, the studio had told him that they were planning to cast a white actor like Alan Arkin or Jack Lemmon to play the part. Van Peebles suggested that they cast a black actor instead.

Raucher and Van Peebles frequently clashed on set, as Raucher intended the movie to be a satire of white, liberal America, whereas Van Peebles wanted to change Raucher's script to make it a black power movie. Raucher ended up novelizing his own screenplay to ensure that his original vision for the story survived in some form. Writing the book himself also ensured that Van Peebles could not enact a clause in his contract that would have allowed him to write it.

On the film's DVD release, Van Peebles says that Raucher wanted the film to end with Gerber waking up to discover that the events of the movie had only been a nightmare and convinced studio executives to allow him to film two alternate endings. Per Van Peebles, he only filmed the current ending of the movie, forgetting to shoot the "it was all a dream" ending "by accident." Raucher's novelization of his own script, however, includes the "workout" ending.

== Release ==
The film opened at the Murray Hill and New Penthouse Theatres in New York on May 27, 1970.

== Reception ==
Columbia was happy with the finished product, and the film was a financial success, leading the studio to offer Van Peebles a three-picture contract. Instead of taking their offer, Van Peebles made the independent film Sweet Sweetback's Baadasssss Song, which later turned out to not only be the highest-grossing independent film of 1971, but also the highest-grossing independent film up to that point. Following that film's success, Columbia rescinded Van Peebles' contract offer.

In an analysis of Watermelon Man in Film Quarterly, scholar Raquel Gates describes it as a "cunning subversion of Hollywood and television conventions."

The film grossed $61,000 in its opening week. It earned theatrical rentals of $1.1 million in the United States and Canada.

In 2023, Bear Manor Media released a book about the film titled Melvin Van Peebles' Watermelon Man by Andrew J. Rausch.

== Soundtrack ==
Watermelon Man

Soundtrack album by Melvin Van Peebles
- Released: 1970
- Genre: Soundtrack
- Label: Beverly Hills
- Producer: Melvin Van Peebles

Melvin Van Peebles chronology
| Watermelon Man (1970) | Sweet Sweetback's Baadasssss Song (1971) |

Van Peebles wrote the music to Watermelon Man himself, in order to have creative control. A soundtrack album was released in 1970, and "Love, That's America", a song from the film and soundtrack, was released as a single in the same year. The single was mentioned as a top pick in Billboard Magazine's October 31, 1970 issue.

The song is narrated from the point of view of someone walking around America, and seeing "people run through the streets, blood streaming from where they been beat", and declaring "naw, this ain't America, you can't fool me".

The soundtrack album was never released on compact disc, although it was released as a digital download through Amazon MP3 and iTunes.

Track listing

All tracks are written by Melvin Van Peebles.

Side one
| No. | Title | Length |
|---|---|---|
| 1. | "Love, That's America" | 4:55 |
| 2. | "Great Guy" | 2:34 |
| 3. | "Eviction Scene" | 5:21 |
| 4. | "Soul'd on You" | 3:43 |

Side two
| No. | Title | Length |
|---|---|---|
| 1. | "Where are the Children" | 3:39 |
| 2. | "Erica's Theme" | 2:41 |
| 3. | "Fugue 1" | 2:09 |
| 4. | "Fugue 2" | 2:37 |
| 5. | "Fugue 3" | 4:36 |
| Total length: | | 31:51 |

== See also ==
- List of American films of 1970
