= Ain't Supposed to Die a Natural Death =

American musical

- Original Logo
- Music: Melvin Van Peebles
- Lyrics: Melvin Van Peebles
- Book: Melvin Van Peebles
- Basis: Van Peebles' earlier albums
- Productions: 1971 Broadway
- Awards: Drama Desk Award for Most Promising Book

Ain't Supposed to Die a Natural Death (Tunes from Blackness) is a musical with a book, music, and lyrics by Melvin Van Peebles. The musical contains some material also on three of Van Peebles' albums, Brer Soul, Ain't Supposed to Die a Natural Death and As Serious as a Heart-Attack, some of which were yet to come out.

The musical is a series of 19 politically outspoken, darkly comic, and sexually charged musical monologues that explore the negative aspects of African-American street life and the ghetto experience. Each character has a painful story to tell in funk, soul, jazz and blues-inflected songs. The innovative piece, presented in a confrontational, "in your face" style, is a precursor to choreopoem, spoken word, and rap music. It "contributed to the growing black presence on Broadway."

In 1970, Van Peebles decided to transform some of the albums he had recorded between 1968 and 1970 into a musical. According to Van Peebles, "The songs were mirroring the incidents that were happening in the streets." Van Peebles marketed the musical to black audiences in churches "all up and down the fucking East Coast. Ministers have congregations, and the congregations would come with busloads of people."

== Productions ==
The piece was first produced by Black Arts/West at Sacramento State College in Sacramento, California, in 1970. After ten previews, the Off-Broadway production, directed by Gilbert Moses, opened on October 20, 1971, at the Ethel Barrymore Theatre, then transferred to the Ambassador, for a total run of 325 performances. The cast included Bill Duke, Albert Hall, Garrett Morris and Beatrice Winde. Ossie Davis and Phylicia Rashad joined the cast in 1972.

In 2004, Classical Theatre of Harlem staged a revival directed by Alfred Preisser, choreographed by Bruce Heath, and featuring Ralph Carter. In 2006, it was presented as theatre in the round in T New York, a small Manhattan cabaret, on weekends only. The production was scheduled for a 2007 tour of the U.S. East Coast.

In 2021, a Broadway revival was announced. The 2022 production will be directed by Kenny Leon, and Mario Van Peebles will serve as creative producer.

== Synopsis ==
In a poor Black neighborhood, nameless characters rail against a general malaise called "the Man." Each one begins his or her musical rant with the repetition of one or two signature phrases. They sing of their frustrations, fears, regrets and pain. The drama stems from the characters' words about their daily lives. Act I follows a "normal" day in the ghetto, but Act II graphically depicts a particularly violent day, in which looting and several brutal killings occur. The characters include a blind beggar, a Malcolm X lieutenant, a pimp, prostitutes, a drag queen, a lesbian, looters, lovers, junkies, a wino, a bag lady, corrupt cops, a disgruntled postal worker, sweatshop workers, and a death row prisoner. The work begins with the "Star Spangled Banner" and ends with the accusatory "Put a Curse on You."

== Song list ==
- Just Don't Make No Sense
- Coolest Place in Town
- You Can Get Up Before Noon Without Being a Square
- Mirror Mirror on the Wall
- Come Raising Your Leg on Me
- You Gotta Be Holdin Out Five Dollars on Me
- Sera Sera Jim
- Catch That on the Corner
- The Dozens
- Funky Girl on Motherless Broadway
- Tenth and Greenwich
- Heh Heh (Chuckle) Good Mornin' Sunshine
- You Ain't No Astronaut
- Three Boxes of Longs Please
- Lilly Done The Zampoughi Every Time I Pulled Her Coattail
- I Got the Blood
- Salamaggi's Birthday
- Come on Feet Do Your Thing
- Put a Curse on You

== Awards and nominations ==
Original Broadway production

Year	Award	Category	Nominee	Result
1972	Tony Award	Best Musical		Nominated
1972	Tony Award	Best Book of a Musical	Melvin Van Peebles	Nominated
1972	Tony Award	Best Original Score	Melvin Van Peebles	Nominated
1972	Tony Award	Best Performance by a Featured Actress in a Musical	Beatrice Winde	Nominated
1972	Tony Award	Best Direction of a Musical	Gilbert Moses	Nominated
1972	Tony Award	Best Scenic Design	Kert Lundell	Nominated
1972	Tony Award	Best Lighting Design	Martin Aronstein	Nominated
1972	Drama Desk Award	Outstanding Book of a Musical	Melvin Van Peebles	Won
1972	Drama Desk Award	Outstanding Director of a Musical	Gilbert Moses	Won
1972	Drama Desk Award	Outstanding Set Design	Martin Aronstein	Won
1972	Theatre World Award		Beatrice Winde	Won
1972	Grammy Award	Best Score from an Original Cast Show Album	Melvin Van Peebles	Nominated

== Soundtrack ==
Ain't Supposed to Die a Natural Death

Soundtrack album by Original Cast
- Released: 1972

Melvin Van Peebles chronology
Sweet Sweetback's Baadasssss Song (1971)	Ain't Supposed to Die a Natural Death (1972)	Don't Play Us Cheap (1973)

A cast album was released by A&M Records.
