= Don't Play Us Cheap (film) =

- Directed by: Melvin Van Peebles
- Written by: Melvin Van Peebles
- Produced by: Melvin Van Peebles
- Starring: Esther Rolle; Avon Long; Mabel King; Rhetta Hughes; Frank Carey; Thomas Anderson; Robert Dunn; Jay Van Leer; Joshie Jo Armstead; Joe Keys Jr.; George Ooppee McCurn
- Cinematography: Bob Maxwell
- Edited by: Melvin Van Peebles
- Music by: Melvin Van Peebles
- Release date: January 1, 1973
- Running time: 100 minutes
- Country: United States
- Language: English

Don't Play Us Cheap is a 1973 American musical comedy film based on the 1970 musical of the same name. The musical was written, produced, scored, edited and directed by Melvin Van Peebles. Both the original stage musical and the film adaptation are based on Van Peebles' 1967 French-language novel La fête à Harlem (1967).

The film stars Avon Long and Joe Keyes Jr. as Brother Dave and Trinity, a pair of demons who take human form to break up a house party thrown by Miss Maybell (Esther Rolle), an African American woman, in honor of her niece Earnestine (Rhetta Hughes), who is celebrating her 20th birthday in Harlem. Trinity's devotion to his mission comes into question when he falls in love with Earnestine. Don't Play Us Cheap was part of a diptych with Van Peebles' stage musical, Ain't Supposed to Die a Natural Death, which presented a darker vision of African American life compared to the lighter portrayal in Don't Play Us Cheap.

Don't Play Us Cheap was filmed in 1972 as Van Peebles' follow-up to his hit film Sweet Sweetback's Baadasssss Song, but he could not find a distributor, and subsequently wound up adapting the script for a Broadway stage play based on the film. The film later received a limited theatrical release on January 1, 1973, and was not widely seen until it was released on home video. The film's plot has been seen as an allegory for African American resilience in the face of adversity. The house party has been described as a stand-in for the Black Panther Party, and the imps turned human as a metaphor for attempts to thwart the black power movement. The film has also been described as a defense of the United States.

== Plot ==
Trinity and Brother Dave are a pair of demons looking for a party to break up. They come across a party in Harlem. Although Trinity is eager, Dave warns him not to touch it. "When black folks throw a party, they don't play!" Trinity joins the party, already in progress, thrown by Miss Maybell in honor of her niece Earnestine's birthday.

Trinity first tries to break the records ("you can't have a party without music"), but finds that they are unbreakable. He drinks an entire bottle of liquor, thinking he has depleted their supply of alcohol, but finds out that all of the guests have brought their own bottles, and when he tries to eat all of the sandwiches, another plate is brought in.

Trinity finds himself unwilling to continue being mean after he insults Earnestine, making her cry. Trinity apologizes to her, and tells her that he has fallen for her. Three more guests show up, Mr. and Mrs. Johnson, and their college-educated son Harold. Earnestine ignores Trinity for Harold. Trinity becomes jealous.

Brother Dave arrives in human form, eager to break up the party, but Trinity is unwilling to. Mr. Johnson tells Harold not to get involved with Earnestine, because her family is too "common," and he can't risk the big future he has ahead of him. Earnestine approaches both Harold and Trinity to dance, but they are pulled back by Mr. Johnson and Dave.

Dave persuades Trinity to try to break up the party before midnight, when they will both be turned into the thing that they pretend to be: human beings. As time runs short, Dave and Trinity find themselves at the dinner table with the rest of the guests. Dave insults Mrs. Johnson, prompting her to leave with her husband and son. The rest of the guests tell Dave that they're glad that they left.

After the dinner, Trinity stands up and announces that he and Earnestine are getting engaged, an announcement which infuriates Dave. Dave makes one last attempt to break up the party by trying to make a move on Miss Maybell. When Dave finds that she is all too willing, he turns himself into a cockroach and tries to sneak out the door before being smashed by Miss Maybell.

== Cast ==
- Thomas Anderson as Mr. Percy
- Jay Van Leer as Mrs. Johnson (as Jay Vanleer)
- Robert Dunn as Brother Bowser
- Mabel King as Sister Bowser
- George Ooppee McCurn as Brother Washington
- Joshie Jo Armstead as Guest
- Frank Carey as Mr. Johnson
- Nate Barnett as Harold Johnson
- Esther Rolle as Miss Maybell
- Avon Long as Brother Dave
- Rhetta Hughes as Earnestine
- Joe Keyes Jr. as Trinity (as Joseph Keyes)

== Production ==
=== Conception, themes and analysis ===
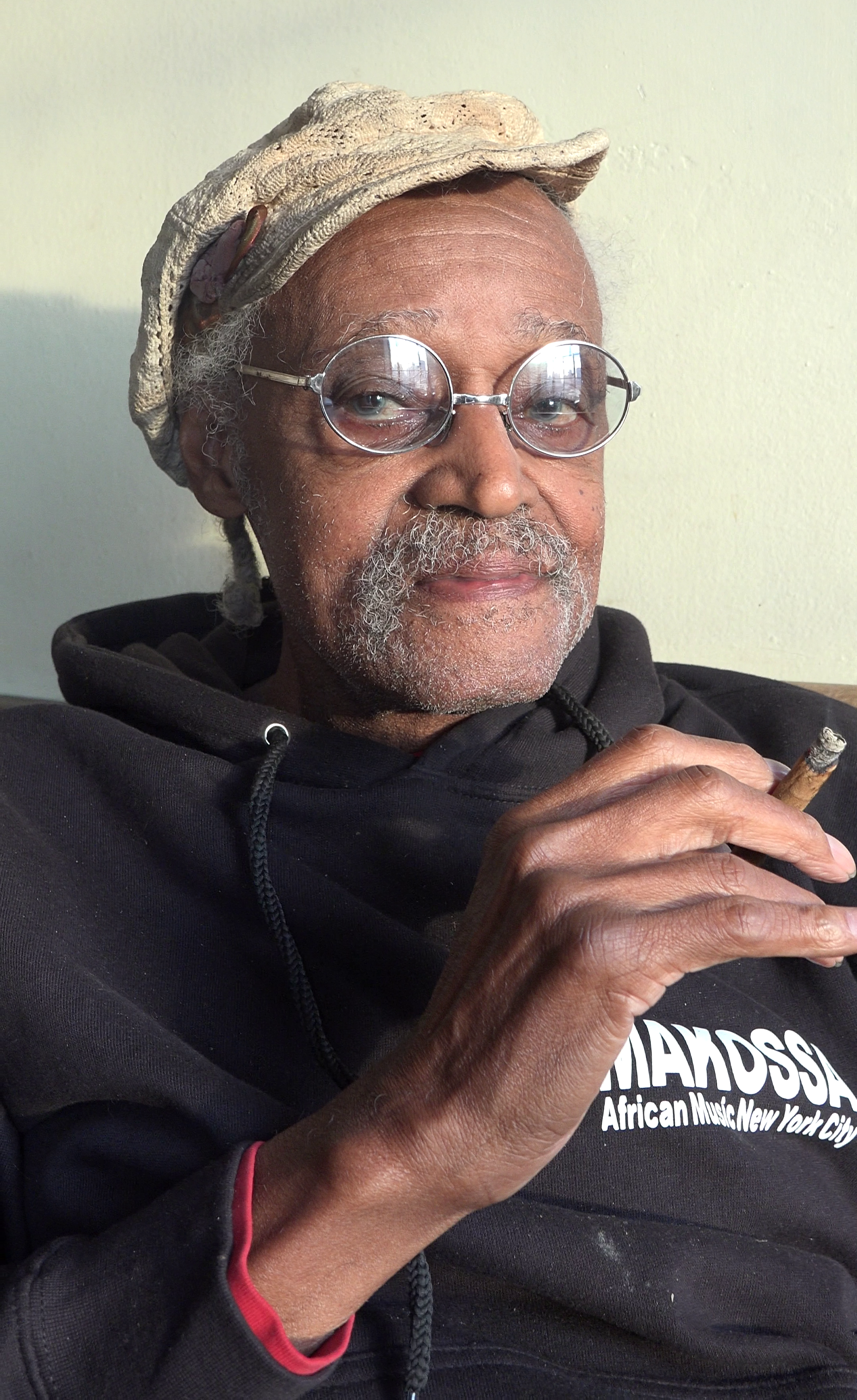
Melvin Van Peebles, pictured in 2015, wrote, produced, directed, edited and scored the film. The cover of one of his albums can be seen as part of the film's set decoration.

Melvin Van Peebles conceived the story of Don't Play Us Cheap after attending a New York City party thrown by an old black woman. When he returned to his home in France, he thought of what would happen if these wonderful, kind, open people were invaded by imps bent on destroying their party. He used this idea as the basis for his French language novel, La fête à Harlem (1967), which he subsequently translated into English. Van Peebles initially conceived of the English adaptation of his French novel as a stage musical; and it had its premiere on the stage at San Francisco State College in November 1970 prior to the creation of the movie.

After this, Van Peebles intended to turn the stage musical into a film as a follow-up to his Sweet Sweetback's Baadasssss Song (1971). A Broadway production of the stage musical was not planned at the time of the film's creation in 1971, but the failure to find a distributor for the completed film led to Van Peebles decision to bring the musical to Broadway in 1972 for a production of the play at the Ethel Barrymore Theatre. The musical was nominated for two Tony Awards; including Van Peebles for the Tony Award for Best Book of a Musical.

Don't Play Us Cheap is part of a diptych with his concurrently running stage musical, Ain't Supposed to Die a Natural Death, which represents the darker side of African American life, with its characters recounting experiences of anguish in a combination of newly written songs and songs that previously appeared on Van Peebles' albums. In contrast, Don't Play Us Cheap focuses on "positive vision of triumph via community and attitude. It's also nothing less than a philosophical examination of good and evil that emphasizes the importance of adopting a positive attitude for making positive change because your vision affects the world", according to a 2021 piece on Van Peebles' films published by PopMatters. Film critic Armond White, in a retrospective review for National Review, opined that the film was a defense of the United States as a nation, calling it, "the most heroic counterpoint to black pop conventions ever made." White continued to state that the film's "farcical fantasy" served to remind viewers "of what we’ve lost", referring to the entire United States. "Van Peebles — a man of nonconformist personality, as a writer, director, composer, and performer– produced works of quintessential American imagination and language. He defied the patronizing approval given to James Baldwin, August Wilson, and Spike Lee and had the good fortune to surpass them all." White also felt that the film "overturns the presumptions of every cultural institution now pledged to make statements on 'diversity' and 'equity,' instead of making art."

According to an essay written by Lisa B. Thompson for the Criterion Collection, Van Peebles' direction of the musical numbers, having solo performers song their songs while the other cast members perform as background singers, is part of the film's social commentary, presenting "the black middle class as an impediment" to individual African Americans finding love and joy. The characters of the Johnsons are used to present the theme that "pretension and inauthenticity are nearly as evil and destructive as the devil’s work, at least to the necessary goals of Black community cohesion and self-determination"; the Johnson family's "bourgeois values" are "phony airs" that the rest of the party guests see through, with Mrs. Johnson wearing fake fur and Mr. Johnson being revealed as another imp who has taken human form.

The character Brother Dave's motives of trying to "break up the party" have been interpreted as a metaphor, with the house party serving as a stand-in for the Black Panther Party, and the imps as to represent attempts to thwart the black power movement. His attempt to spread rumors of adultery fails when the couples in question reveal that they are "quarter-separated", in open marriages, which serves as a class-based argument in favor of free love, because "the Bible and law books and other books, sometimes agree and sometimes don’t and seem to favor those who can afford expensive solutions, but poor people take their laws from 'the Book of Life'," according to a 2021 piece on Van Peebles' films published by PopMatters. Justin Remer, reviewing the Criterion Collection release Melvin Van Peebles: Essential Films for DVD Talk, said that the film is "an allegory about black folks' ability to carry on in the face of whatever roadblocks that the devil or the man or whitey or capitalism or whoever puts in their way."

As part of the film's set decoration, Van Peebles displayed pictures of Malcolm X, Martin Luther King, Isaac Hayes (via the cover to his album Black Moses) and Van Peebles himself, via the cover for his own album As Serious as a Heart-Attack. The opening credits declare that the film stars "brothers and sisters getting their groove on", a callback to the opening credits of his previous film, Sweet Sweetback's Baadasssss Song, which contains the credit that the film stars "the black community".

=== Music and lyrics ===
The film combines the idioms of American and European musicals, with Van Peebles drawing influence from the works of Bertolt Brecht and Kurt Weill. The film's songs draw from rhythm and blues, gospel, soul, jazz, rock, pop, doo-wop and blues. Rather than using the songs to traditionally move the plot forward, Van Peebles uses them to "form a portrait of the time and place", Harlem in the early 1970s on Saturday evening. The characters, within the context of the narrative, are singing along to records which they selected to hear at the party, and are depicted as discussing the songs that form the musical's score. The lyrics of "The Eight Day Week" contrasts the labor-intensive lives of Harlem residents with the work of a chain gang. Van Peebles' lyrics are often in contrast to the musical style of the songs, as exemplified by "Saturday Night", which espouses the singers' delight in secular values to the tune of gospel music. In the audio mix for "I'm a Bad Character", mixing effects were applied to singer Joe Keyes Jr.'s vocals, and dissonant sounds were added to the mix, in order to reflect the character of Trinity's "internal struggle over good and evil", according to Lisa B. Thompson.

== Release ==
=== Media ===
Don't Play Us Cheap (Original Cast & Soundtrack Album)

Soundtrack album by Original Cast
- Released: 1972
- Recorded: 1972
- Genre: R&B; gospel; soul; jazz; rock; pop; doo-wop; blues
- Label: Stax
- Producer: Melvin Van Peebles

Melvin Van Peebles chronology
Ain't Supposed to Die a Natural Death (1972)	Don't Play Us Cheap (Original Cast & Soundtrack Album) (1972)

Professional ratings
Review scores
Source	Rating
Allmusic	3/5 stars

A soundtrack album was released in 1972 by Stax Records, as a double album, containing the following track listing:

Side A
No.	Title	Length
1.	"You Cut Up the Clothes in the Closet of My Dreams"	5:45
2.	"Break That Party and Opening"	2:15
3.	"Eight Day Week"	0:45
4.	"Bowsers Thing"	3:55
5.	"Book of Life"	4:20

Side B
No.	Title	Length
6.	"Quittin' Time"	7:05
7.	"Ain't Love Grand"	4:10
8.	"I'm a Bad Character"	2:35
9.	"Know Your Business"	1:45
10.	"Feast on Me"	3:25

Side C
No.	Title	Length
11.	"Ain't Love Grand"	4:10
12.	"Break That Party"	3:00
13.	"Someday It Seems That It Just Don't Even Pay to Get Out of Bed"	3:25
14.	"Quartet"	5:45
15.	"Phoney Game"	1:40

Side D
No.	Title	Length
16.	"It Makes No Difference"	2:30
17.	"Bad Character Bossa Nova"	3:35
18.	"Quarter"	4:05
19.	"Washingtons Thing"	5:00
20.	"(If You See a Devil) Smash Him"	2:15
Total length:		71:25

The film received a limited theatrical release on January 1, 1973. It was largely unseen until it was released on videotape in the mid-1990s. In 2021, the film was released on Blu-ray Disc as part of the Criterion Collection's Melvin Van Peebles film collection, Melvin Van Peebles: Essential Films.

=== Reception ===
In his retrospective review for National Review, Armond White wrote that "Don’t Play Us Cheap elevates lowly caricatures from minstrelsy and Porgy & Bess via Van Peebles’s affable vision. He respects their vulgarity as signs of life, endows them with humor, intelligence, and resilience." Justin Remer, reviewing the Criterion Collection release Melvin Van Peebles: Essential Films for DVD Talk, wrote that "Don't Play Us Cheap is my less-than-conventional pick for favorite of this collection. And a huge part of that is related to the musical score and performances." Chris Wiegand wrote for The Guardian in 2022, covering the film's Blu-ray release, "even with the film’s dated visual effects and uneven comedy, [Don't Play Us Cheap] is an irresistible soul-saver of a musical".
