= Sweet Sweetback's Baadasssss Song (soundtrack) =

Soundtrack album by Earth, Wind & Fire
- Released: June 1971
- Recorded: 1971
- Genres: Funk, soul
- Length: 37:28
- Label: Stax

Earth, Wind & Fire chronology
The Need of Love (1971)	Sweet Sweetback's Baadasssss Song (1971)	Last Days and Time (1972)

Melvin Van Peebles chronology
Watermelon Man (1970)	Sweet Sweetback's Baadasssss Song (1971)	Ain't Supposed To Die A Natural Death (1972)

Professional ratings
Review scores
Source	Rating
AllMusic	3.5/5 stars
Billboard	(favourable)
UDiscover Music	(favourable)
Record Collector	(favourable)
Uncut	4/5 stars

Sweet Sweetback's Baadasssss Song is the soundtrack to Melvin Van Peebles' 1971 feature film of the same name. The soundtrack was performed by then-unknown Earth, Wind & Fire and released in 1971 on Stax Records. To attract publicity for the film without spending significant money, the soundtrack was released before the movie; it performed well, reaching No. 13 on the Billboard Top R&B Albums chart.

== Overview ==
As a soundtrack the album was ranked at No. 32 on Mojo's "MOJO 1000 – The Ultimate CD Buyers Guide".

== Critical reception ==
Ian McCann of udiscovermusic.com found "Today, though, you couldn’t find a record, soundtrack, or otherwise, as freewheelin’ and funky as this." With a 3.5 out of 5 stars review, Richie Unterberger of AllMusic wrote "Heard on its own, the soundtrack, unlike Super Fly or Shaft, is not a significant musical achievement. It's serviceable period funk-soul, both instrumental and vocal, sprinkled with some dialog from the film". Jamie Atkins of Record Collector found the soundtrack is "Well worth checking out."

== Track listing ==
=== Side One ===
1. "Sweetback Losing His Cherry" (2:45)
2. "Sweetback Getting It Uptight And Preaching It So Hard The Bourgeois Reggin Angels In Heaven Turn Around" (5:00)
3. "Come On Feet Do Your Thing" (4:15)
4. "Sweetback's Theme" (7:36)

=== Side Two ===
1. "Hoppin' John" (2:25)
  "Voices" (0:11)
2. "Mojo Woman" (2:43)
  "Voices" (0:15)
3. "Sanra Z" (3:47)
  "Voices" (0:17)
4. "Reggins Hanging On In There As Best They Can" (2:58)
  "Voices" (1:13)
5. "Won't Bleed Me" (2:41)
6. "The Man Tries Running His Usual Game but Sweetback's Jones Is So Strong He Wastes the Hounds (Yeah! Yeah! and Besides That He Will Be Comin' Back Takin' Names and Collecting Dues)" (4:25)
