= Ain't Supposed to Die a Natural Death (album) =

Studio album by Melvin Van Peebles
- Released: 1970
- Genre: Spoken word
- Label: A&M
- Producer: Melvin Van Peebles

Melvin Van Peebles chronology
Brer Soul (1969)	Ain't Supposed to Die a Natural Death (1970)	As Serious as a Heart-Attack (1974)

Ain't Supposed to Die a Natural Death is a 1971 album by Melvin Van Peebles, featuring mostly spoken word poetry over music written by Van Peebles. Some of its material was used in later projects such as the stage musical of the same name and Sweet Sweetback's Baadasssss Song. Note that this is an album of original material, not to be confused with the soundtrack LP released for the musical itself.

== Track listing ==
All music and words by Melvin Van Peebles

=== Side One ===
1. "Three Boxes of Longs Please"
2. "You Ain't No Astronaut"
3. "Come On Feet Do Your Thing"
4. "Funky Girl On Motherless Broadway"
5. "Put a Curse On You"

=== Side Two ===
1. "I Got The Blood"
2. "You Gotta Be Holdin Out Five Dollars On Me"
3. "Heh Heh (Chuckle) Good Morning sunshine"
4. "Salamaggi's Birthday"

== Personnel ==
- Melvin Van Peebles - Vocals
- Warren Smith - Drums, Percussion
- Bross Townsend - Piano, Organ, Electric Harpsichord
- Herb Bushler - Bass, Electric Bass, Violin, Tambourine
- Carl Lynch - Guitar, Bass Guitar
- Nat Woodward - Trumpet, Cornet
- Al Gibbons, George Barrow - Tenor Saxophone, Soprano Saxophone
- Howard Johnson - Baritone Saxophone, Flugelhorn, Tuba
- Gene Radice - Engineer
- Produced and Conceived by Melvin Van Peebles
- Arranged and Conducted by Warren Smith
- All words and music by Melvin Van Peebles, ASCAP, Almo Music Corp.
- Art Director: Tom Wikes
- Photography: Jim McCrary
