= As Serious as a Heart-Attack =

Studio album by Melvin Van Peebles
- Released: 1971
- Recorded: 1971
- Genre: Spoken word
- Label: A&M
- Producer: Melvin Van Peebles

Melvin Van Peebles chronology
Ain't Supposed to Die a Natural Death (1970)	As Serious as a Heart-Attack (1971)	What the....You Mean I Can't Sing?! (1974)

Professional ratings
Review scores
Source	Rating
Allmusic	3/5 stars

As Serious as a Heart-Attack is a 1971 spoken word album by Melvin Van Peebles. This is Van Peebles third studio record. The album's cover can be briefly glimpsed on the bathroom door in Van Peebles' 1973 film Don't Play Us Cheap.

== Track listing ==
All tracks composed by Melvin Van Peebles

=== Countryside ===
1. "Rufus & Ruby"
2. "Mothers Prayer"
3. "The Country Brother & The City Sister"
4. "Chippin"

=== Cityside ===
1. "Just Don't Make No Sense"
2. "Dearmistuh P"
3. "Love, That's America"
4. "I Remember"
5. "My Pal Johnny"

== Personnel ==
=== Musicians ===
- Rhetta Hughes - guest vocalist on "Mother's Prayer"
- Doug Carn - keyboards
- John Boudreaux Jr. - drums
- Tom Scott, Albert Hall Jr. - horns
- William Henderson - strings
- Clydie King, Venetta Fields, Rhetta Hughes, Jessica Smith - backing vocals

=== Engineers ===
- Robert Appère - recording and mix
- Dick Burns - mix
- Produced And Conceived By Melvin Van Peebles
- All Words And Music By Melvin Van Peebles
- All Selections Published By Almo Music Corp./Yeah Inc., Ascap,
- Except "Love That's, America," Colgems Music, Ascap
- Art Direction: Roland Young
- Album Design: Chuck Beeson
- Photography: Jim McCrary
