= Brer Soul =

Studio album by Melvin Van Peebles
- Released: 1968
- Genre: Soul jazz; spoken word
- Label: A&M
- Producer: Melvin Van Peebles

Melvin Van Peebles chronology
Brer Soul (1968)	Ain't Supposed to Die a Natural Death (1970)

Brer Soul is the debut studio album of Melvin Van Peebles. Released in 1968, the album introduced Van Peebles as a recording artist, following his work as an independent filmmaker, playwright and novelist. It is notable for its use of sprechgesang, a vocal style which lies between speaking and singing.

Unlike later albums, which are more varied in style, Brer Soul features an experimental spoken word style, with soul jazz instrumentation. Van Peebles' unconventional songwriting style has since been cited as an influence on hip hop music and rapping.

== Background ==
While living in France, Van Peebles began to write plays in French which were intended to express the ghetto's turmoil and pathos. Van Peebles used the sprechgesang vocal style in these plays as a form he could tell stories in. This style formed the basis of his debut as a recording artist, Brer Soul, which was categorized as a spoken word album.

== Style ==
Brer Soul features Van Peebles delivering spoken lyrics accented by soul jazz grooves. Allmusic writer Ed Hogan compares Van Peebles' vocals to "Louis Armstrong, the comedy albums of Bill Cosby from the '70s, and the wild antics of cartoon voice artists Mel Blanc and Hans Conreid [sic]". Another Allmusic writer, Thom Jurek, compared Van Peebles' delivery to that of Bob Dylan and Leonard Cohen. Van Peebles describes his vocal style as "the old Southern style", which was influenced by singers he had heard growing up in South Chicago. Van Peebles also said that he was influenced by older forms of African-American music: "[...] people like Blind Lemon Jefferson and the field hollers. I was also influenced by spoken word song styles from Germany that I encountered when I lived in France."

The music is more jazz-oriented and less beat-conscious than that of other spoken word artists, such as the Last Poets and Gil Scott-Heron. Writer Darius James described the music as being minimalist and similar to that of Charles Mingus. While the album contains socially conscious themes, it primarily reflects stream of consciousness rather than political activism or rebellion. Allmusic writer Richie Unterberger describes Van Peebles' lyrics as "portraits of romantic losers, a women's house of detention, and admiring the neighborhood foxes, all delivered in Van Peebles' brand of hipster jive."

== Reception and legacy ==
Professional ratings
Review scores
Source	Rating
Allmusic	3.5/5 stars

Brer Soul has been cited as influencing rapping and hip hop music. Describing the album, Darius James called the album "'spoken-word' performance at its raw best." Allmusic gave the album 3.5 out of 5 stars, with writer Richie Unterberger calling it "an interesting antecedent to the use of spoken prose in African-American R&B-derived music." In 2010, the album was released on compact disc by RPM, with liner notes by Van Peebles commenting on the album's production and lyrics.

== Track listing ==
=== Side One ===
1. "Lilly Done The Zampoughi Everytime I Pulled Her Coattail" 7:15
2. "Mirror Mirror On The Wall" 4:39
3. "The Coolest Place in Town" 3:17
4. "You Can Get Up Before Noon Without Being a Square" 3:27
5. "The Dozens" 5:05

=== Side Two ===
1. "Tenth and Greenwich (Women's House of Detention)" 9:06
2. "Come Raise Your Leg On Me" 4:16
3. "Sera Sera Jim" 4:15
4. "Catch That On The Corner" 6:59

== Performers ==
- Melvin Van Peebles – vocal
- Coleridge Perkinson – piano, organ
- Warren Smith – drums, percussion
- Herb Bushler – bass, bass guitar
- Carl Lynch – guitar
- Nat Woodard – trumpet
- Al Gibbons – tenor saxophone, flute
- Howard Johnson – baritone saxophone, tuba
- Gene Radice – Engineer
