= Cat Daddy =

Single by The Rej3ctz

from the album TheFUNKtion vs theKICKback
- Released: February 16, 2011; June 27, 2011 (re-release)
- Recorded: 2010
- Genre: Hyphy
- Length: 3:20
- Label: The Aurelius Group
- Songwriters: Warren Baker, Leroy Barnes, Jovan Clayton, Jeremy Hawkins, Tevin Rivers
- Producer: JHawk

"Cat Daddy" is a 2011 song by American hip hop group The Rej3ctz. It is based on a dance of the same name and is from the 2010 mixtape TheFUNKtion vs theKICKback. "Cat Daddy" was a MTV Jams "Jam Of The Week" in January 2011. It was released for digital download on February 16, 2011, on iTunes and subsequently charted on several Billboard charts, including the Hot R&B/Hip-Hop Songs chart, where it spent fourteen weeks and eventually peaked at number 77, after being re-released on June 27, 2011. In 2018, the song was certified platinum by the Recording Industry Association of America.

Chris Brown performed the Cat Daddy dance during the 106 & Park 10th Anniversary special in October 2010. Brown was the featured dance performer on the song's official video, which as of November 24, 2018, has about 109 million YouTube views. A Cat Daddy 2.0 video by Mario Van Peebles preceded the re-release of the song and was associated with the movie We the Party. Several notable celebrities have been filmed doing the dance, including Justin Bieber and Selena Gomez. The dance is described as a combination of buckling a seatbelt and rolling a wheelchair.

The song and dance became a viral video in May 2012 when then-current Sports Illustrated Swimsuit Issue cover model Kate Upton posted a video of her bikini-clad rendition of the dance on YouTube, causing YouTube to temporarily ban the video. The propriety of the YouTube ban was hotly debated with articles in many top-tier publications including the Los Angeles Times, The Washington Post and the Daily News as well as leading news services such as ABC News and Fox News. The video of Upton performing the dance video has about 28.4 million YouTube views, as of October 17, 2023.

== Release ==
External videos
- Behind the scenes video production on YouTube from Venice Beach posted August 27, 2010
- Official video on YouTube by The Rej3ctz with Chris Brown (uncredited) posted December 2, 2010
- Cat Daddy 2.0 video on YouTube by The Rej3ctz with Mario Van Peebles posted April 12, 2011

"Cat Daddy"
Sample of "Cat Daddy" by The Rej3ctz from TheFUNKtion vs theKICKback

The "Cat Daddy" dance was originated by The Rej3ctz group member Reject Sam Awolope (DJ Major League) before the group linked it to the song. The song came from a 2010 mixtape entitled TheFUNKtion vs theKICKback, which is sometimes just referred to as The FUNKtion. In late 2010 and 2011, Chris Brown popularized the Cat Daddy dance after performing it in the official video. On October 6, 2010, Brown performed the Cat Daddy on 106 & Park for their 10-year anniversary show. Then, the Rej3ctz released a video of the song, featuring Brown dancing, that was produced at Venice Beach on or before August 2010.

The song was released February 16, 2011 as a music download on iTunes. According to Thomas Clayton of The Daily Rind, the song had 14,000 downloads on iTunes in its first week and the video had 9 million pageviews at the time. By April 20, 2011, the official video had 21 million pageviews. As of October 17, 2023 the original December 2, 2010 upload of the official video has over 89.7 million YouTube views, while an alternate March 9, 2011 upload of the video has 29 million plus views.

In April 2011, Mario Van Peebles produced a "Cat Daddy 2.0" video that included appearances of several artist playing parody roles of themselves like actor and singer Quincy, rapper YG and entertainer Carlos Olivero. The video was associated with the release of Van Peebles' movie We the Party and the story behind The Rej3ctz' audition for it. The video shows how The Rej3ctz anticipated succeeding in their auditions, but realized that the competition was stiffer than expected. They were rejected until Van Peebles' kids got Mario to ask them to perform their song and dance. The video was Van Peebles' first music video. The song was re-released on iTunes on June 27, 2011.

=== Reception ===
Billboard described the song as a "low-slung". MostlyJunkFood.com described the song and video as "another one of those weak on lyrical content, but making up for it with a bangin beat and some standard Chris Breezy dancin’ abouts". In January 2011, the song was recognized by MTV Jams as the "Jam Of The Week". Although the song only spent one week on the Billboard Hot 100, peaking at number 97 on June 18, 2011, it spent fourteen weeks on the Hot R&B/Hip-Hop Songs chart peaking at 77 on July 16, 2011, and was listed on the Top Heatseekers list for eleven weeks, peaking at number 12 on June 18, 2011.

=== Production background ===
The original video was directed by Alex Nazari. TheFUNKtion vs theKICKback mixtape that included "Cat Daddy" was produced by JHawk.

== Kate Upton videos ==
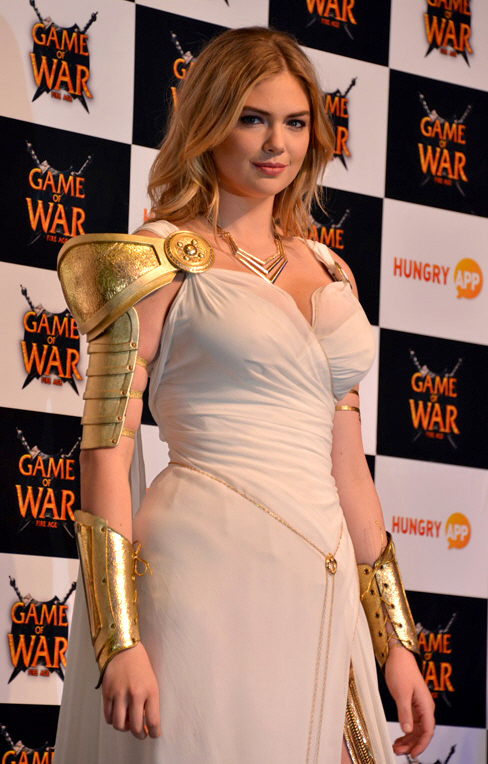
Kate Upton recorded a viral video of the song.

External videos
- Kate Upton doing the Cat Daddy on YouTube posted on May 1, 2012
- Cat Daddy highlights on YouTube of Justin Bieber

Kate Upton, who in February 2012 was the cover model for the Sports Illustrated Swimsuit Issue, recorded a video of the Dougie that went viral and garnered over 5 million hits in April 2011. She announced her intention to release a video performance of the Cat Daddy when she served as grand marshal for the 2012 Daytona 500. The video of Upton dancing on a break between photo shots was posted online on April 30 by photographer Terry Richardson, without Upton's consent.

After garnering close to 1 million hits in the first 24 hours, YouTube banned Kate Upton's version of the dance from their site for being too risqué. After some deliberation about whether it "violated the website’s rules on nudity and sexual content" the video was restored to their website. Upton's Cat Daddy video clip was a part of Terry Richardson's vlog. Richardson has a reputation for "raunchy" artwork. According to the Los Angeles Times the video was removed on May 1, 2012, while the Daily News reported its removal was May 2.

Both agree that the video was restored late on May 2, although Fox News reports that it was initially restored with an age restriction. During the YouTube ban, Upton's Cat Daddy gained exposure at Vimeo when Richardson uploaded it there in response to the ban. As of November 24, 2018, her version of the dance has received about 27.25 million YouTube views.

Following Upton's April 30 rendition, The Rej3ctz were impressed enough with Upton that they attempted to contact her regarding future collaboration(s). On the edition of June 21, 2012 of Late Night with Jimmy Fallon she performed a fully clothed rendition of the "Cat Daddy" alongside Fallon. Prior to performing the dance she described the movements of the dance as buckling a seatbelt and rolling a wheelchair. YouTube now hosts videos of numerous celebrities doing the Cat Daddy including Selena Gomez and Justin Bieber.

== Track listing ==
- Digital Download – Explicit version
1. "Cat Daddy" (Explicit) — 3:20
- Digital Download – Clean version
1. "Cat Daddy" (Clean) — 3:20
- Digital Download – Extended play
1. "Cat Daddy" (Explicit) — 3:20
2. "Cat Daddy" (Clean) — 3:20
3. "Cat Daddy" (Instrumental version) — 3:34

== Chart performance ==
Chart (2011)	Peak position
US Billboard Hot 100	97
US Billboard R&B/Hip-Hop Songs	77
US Billboard Heatseekers Songs	12

== Release history ==
Country	Date	Format(s)	Label	Version
United States	February 16, 2011	Digital download	The Aurelius Group	Explicit version
United States	February 16, 2011	Digital download	The Aurelius Group	Clean version
United States	February 16, 2011	Digital download	The Aurelius Group	Extended play
Canada	February 16, 2011	Digital download	The Aurelius Group	Explicit version
Canada	February 16, 2011	Digital download	The Aurelius Group	Extended play
United States	June 27, 2011	Digital download	The Aurelius Group	Explicit version re-release
Canada	June 27, 2011	Digital download	The Aurelius Group	Explicit version re-release

== Certifications ==
Region	Certification	Certified units/sales
United States (RIAA)	Platinum	1,000,000^{‡}
^{‡} Sales+streaming figures based on certification alone.
