= JHawk =

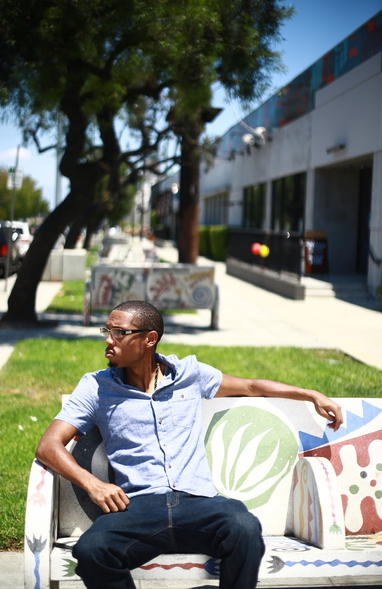
- JHawk in August 2014

Background information
- Born: Jeremy Hawkins; August 8, 1991 (age 35)
- Origin: Los Angeles, California, United States
- Genres: Hip hop; R&B
- Occupations: Record producer; songwriter
- Instruments: Reason; Logic Pro
- Years active: 2006–present
- Labels: 22andlife; JHawk Productions
- Website: jhawkproductions.com

Jeremy Hawkins (born August 8, 1991), known professionally as JHawk or JHawk Productions, is an American record producer and songwriter from Los Angeles, California. He is known for pioneering the Jerkin' movement, accumulating tens of millions of views and streams and contributing heavily to the success of a number of Los Angeles-based artists. Hawkins is perhaps best known for producing The Rej3ctz's breakout hit "Cat Daddy" in 2011, which reached number 77 on the Hot R&B/Hip-Hop Songs and achieved platinum certification independently.

== Early life ==
JHawk grew up in Leimert Park, Los Angeles. His parents are musicians: his mother is a local vocalist, and his father is a multi-instrumentalist. He is a great nephew to The Chambers Brothers, and he often observed the band rehearse and play live shows for his great-grandmother. Shortly after his father gave him his first music sequencer software, Hip Hop eJay, he started making beats at the age of 11 and desired to become a music producer. Stating to Killerhiphophop's Quez, "I put out my 1st song on the internet when I was about 15-16, and I've just been going hard ever since".

== Music career ==
=== 2008–present ===
After 3 years and a junior at Daniel Murphy High School, the Archdiocese decided to shut the school's doors. Jeremy, who'd been building a name for himself on campus by recording students in his bedroom studio at his grandmother's was forced to relocate senior year. Stating to KHH, " I went to a private school called Daniel Murphy. It got shut down actually. I had to complete my last year of High School at a new High School". After moving out of his grandmother's house, he moved in with his father. Gutting the garage and making a studio space in the spring of 2008. Often recording his cousin Left Brain, who brought Tyler The Creator, Hodgy Beats, Casey Veggies, of the year old collective Odd future. Recording and producing for the collective, The Odd Future Tape, The Dena Tape.

JHawk attended The Academy of Music and Performing Arts at Hamilton High School in the summer of 2008. Due to a credit issue, he was required to attend a piano lesson class for admission and freshman PE class his senior year. Subsequently, adding an Electronic Music and Music History course, soon meeting friend Syd Tha Kyd in Hamilton's electronic music class. After being at Hamilton for months and remaining unnoticed he aggressively fought to gain attention. Garnering his Myspace page he began to send out beats, connecting with YG on MySpace, the two collaborated on songs that would combine for over 3 Million plays.

JHawk signed a co-music publishing deal with Kara DioGuardi and Stephen Finfer's Arthouse Entertainment, now administered by BMG Chrysalis.

=== Jerkin' ===
With a heavy influence from then Hyphy movement, (Keak da Sneak, Turf Talk, E-40) and newfound fame from working with YG & The Pu$haz Jeremy started to collaborate with anyone, often his fellow students on campus. Slowly building recognition, kids on campus started to dance to the music, in all styles, but most notably a new style called Jerkin'. Taking notice saying, "I never sought out to make a jerk beat. I always just did me. I did JHawk. People danced to my music and I kind of developed a formula to what they were grabbing off of my beats." Eventually dance crews such as the Rangers formed on campus and videos were made with the music to match amassing tens of millions of hits on Myspace and the newly created YouTube. At the age of 17 and having worked with almost all of La's male youth, he longed to form a group. On the bleachers in the PE class he was succumbed to is when he met 6 female freshman who all rapped. The same day they quickly formed the name of the group Pink Dollaz. After 2 months the music was streamed over 5 million times across Myspace and YouTube with radio spins from Dj Carisma's Power 106. A slew of relationships such as these formed by spring 2009. Another song titled 'Tippin' today amasses 14 million plays on one YouTube video alone. LA Weekly's Jeff Weiss stating, "The wiry J-Hawk is the nexus that binds all of these groups together. After all, he's produced their hits, and to think it might not have happened if Daniel Murphy High hadn't shuttered last year, causing the 17-year-old Hawkins to transfer to Hamilton". The genre, sound and culture exploded to the mainstream. After amassing press mentions from The New York Times, LA Times LA Weekly and a host of acts signed to major label deals: New Boyz, The Rej3ctz, Audio Push, and YG. JHawk stated, "I'm definitely fortunate for the movement and being one of the starters of it back in 2008".

=== Cat Daddy ===
After a year and growing frustrated, JHawk reconnected with The Rej3ctz. According to JHawk, "We were major contributors, but we felt we weren't getting our shine. So we wanted to start a new movement." In the spring of 2010, at JHawk's home recording studio, The Rej3ctz recorded their song Cat Daddy.

=== Flight In Progress ===
Flight in Progress is JHawk's music business venture, which helps independent artists and music producers with music distribution, music streaming, and other related services. The venture's content is delivered via YouTube and SoundCloud.

=== 22andlife ===
The production company founded by Jeremy JHawk Hawkins, currently it boats no artist and solely exists as a creative outlet for music projects, videos, street-wear and events.

== Discography ==
=== Extended plays ===
List of EPs, with selected information
Title	Album details
22	Released: August 1, 2014; Label: 22andlife; Format: Digital download
Fairfax and Pico (with Mann)	Released: October 20, 2017; Label: Empire, Peace Life Quality Recordings, JHawk Productions; Format: Digital download

=== Mixtapes ===
- Jerkin' with JHawk (2009)

=== Albums ===
- For The Function (2018)

=== As a lead artist ===
- Pressure (2015)

== Production discography ==
=== Selected discography ===
- 2008: Pheo-'Hot Chick'
- 2008: PC-'Like Cheesy'
- 2008: JHawk-'Summa Luv feat. Tyler The Creator & Hodgy Beats
- 2008: Hodgy Beats - This is My Life, Work That Sh*t, Pop That, Change it Up, Clothes Off, Kush On My Mind
- 2009: JHawk Productions -Tippin On My D*ck (feat TH1ZZ & Jinc)
- 2009: YG (rapper) -Bad B*tch, 'P*ssy Killa, Party Like That
- 2009: Ty Dolla Sign - Pussy Killer Remix
- 2009: Pink Dollaz-Im tasty, Never Hungry, Don't Need No, Lap Dance, Ball Game
- 2009: Hazel E- Pop My Butt, Party Like That (feat. YG (rapper) )
- 2009: Asia Lynn- Bite My Swagg, Filthy Girl
- 2009: Indigo Vanity (BigKlit)- Rock Your World, Snap A Pic
- 2010: Mann (rapper) - Pressure feat Casey Veggies, Kickin it With The Lingo feat Skeme & SC
- 2010: Cold Flamez- Rhythm & Bass, Saturday Nights
- 2010: E-40 -Wet
- 2010: Sabi (American singer) - Get It Girl
- 2011: Travis Mills -Now Its Your Turn, Million, Umbrella, Come Inside, Keep Callin
- Keep Calling, Whats My Name, Pass Out, Whats My Name
- 2011: Iggy Azalea -Sippin My Tea
- 2011: The Rej3ctz -Cat Daddy, Rej3ct Stomp
- 2011: Cali Swag District - What You Drankin
- 2012: Casey Veggies -Verified, Lucid Dreams feat. Rich Hil
- 2012: Buddy (rapper) - Get Yo Girl, I Got Money (feat. Thurzday) unreleased
- 2012: Tanvi Shah - Zindagi
- 2013: O.T. Genasis -My Turn Up, Icon
- 2013: E-40 -Bamboo
- 2014: Khalil (singer) -Say Yes, Livin For
- 2015: Serayah McNeill -Is It
- 2015: Chris Brown -Day One.
- 2016: E-40 feat. Kamaiyah - Petty
- 2017: Mann (rapper) - Fairfax & Pico (EP)
- 2017: Tyga - Nasty Nasty or Nasty Ni**a
- 2017: Iggy Azalea feat. Zedd- Boom Boom (co.)
- 2019: La Goony Chonga- No Quieres Lio

=== Singles Produced ===
Year	Title	Chart positions				Certifications	Album
Year	Title	US	US R&B	US Rap	Billboard 200 Soundtrack	Certifications	Album
2010	"Cat Daddy" (The Rej3ctz)	97	77	—		RIAA: Platinum	
2016	Petty (E-40 feat. Kamaiyah)	--	--	--			The D Boy Diary Deluxe
2017	Boom Boom (Iggy Azalea feat. Zedd) (co.)	--	--	--	#2		Pitch Perfect 3 (film series)

== Filmography ==
Film
Year	Title	Role
2012	We the Party	DJ
2015	Some Kind of Hate	Bud
