= Van Peebles =

Van Peebles is a surname. Notable people with the surname include:

- Mandela Van Peebles (born 1994), American actor; the son of Mario and grandson of Melvin Van Peebles
- Mario Van Peebles (born 1957), American actor and film director; the son of Melvin Van Peebles
- Melvin Van Peebles (1932–2021), American actor, film director, screenwriter, playwright, writer and composer
