= Michael Copon =

American actor and producer (born 1982)

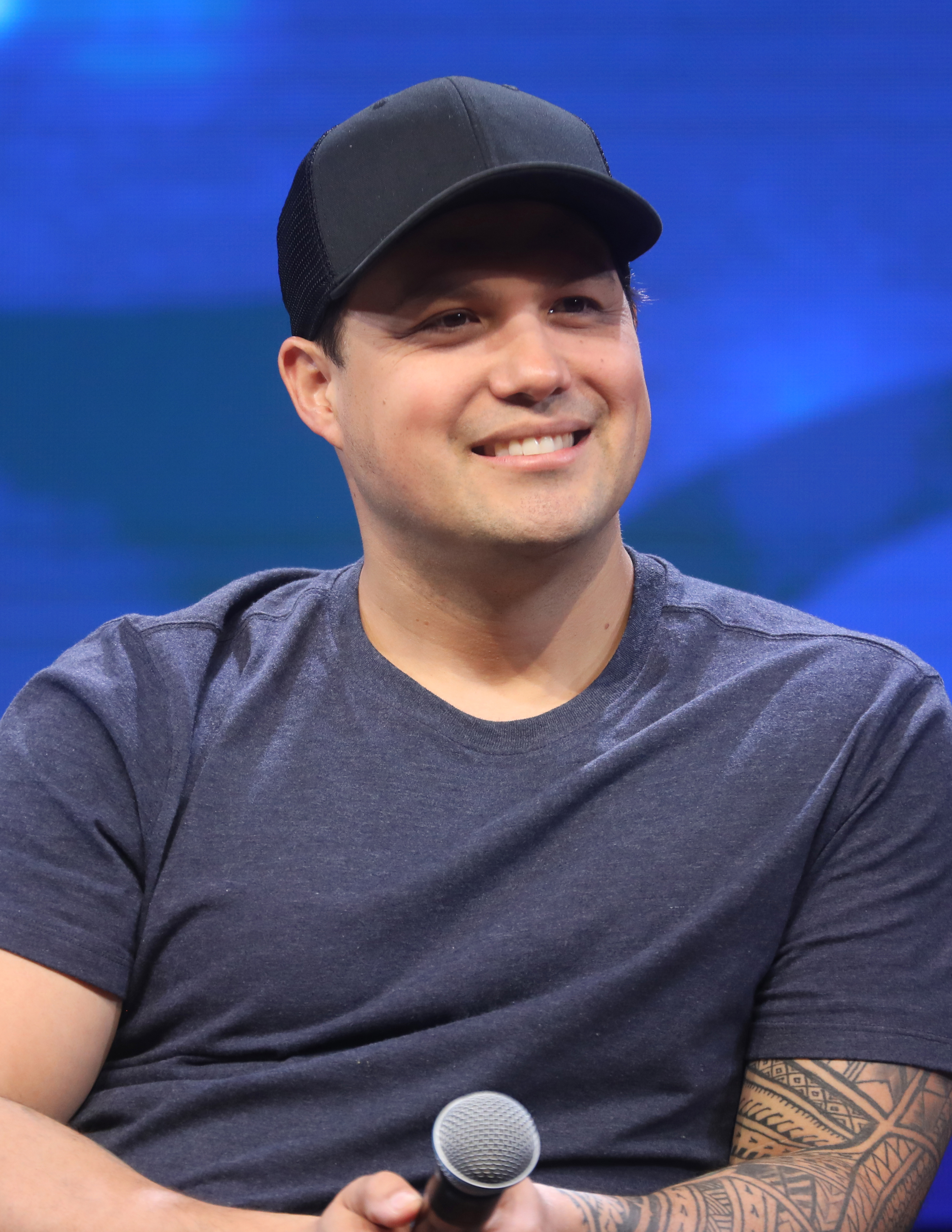
- Copon in 2024
- Born: November 13, 1982 (age 43); Chesapeake, Virginia, U.S.
- Occupations: Actor; producer
- Years active: 2001–present

Michael Copon (born November 13, 1982) is an American actor and producer. He is known for playing Felix Taggaro in the television series One Tree Hill, Vin Keahi in the television series Beyond the Break, and Lucas Kendall in Power Rangers Time Force.

== Early life ==
Copon was born on November 13, 1982 and raised in Chesapeake, Virginia. His father is Filipino. He graduated from Deep Creek High School in 2000.

== Career ==
In 2001, Copon portrayed the Blue Power Ranger, Lucas Kendall, on the Power Rangers Time Force television series. He reprised this role in two episodes of Power Rangers Wild Force. In 2004, he appeared in a music video for the song "Backflip" by Raven-Symoné which was directed by Sanaa Hamri. Copon portrayed the recurring character Felix Taggaro on the television series One Tree Hill. From 2006 to 2009, Copon recurred on the drama series Beyond the Break on The N network. In between that time (in 2005) he appeared (and subsequently won) the competition on VH1's But Can They Sing?

In 2008, Copon played the love interest of Ashley Benson in straight-to-video movie Bring It On: In It to Win It. Copon followed this up in 2008 playing the title role in straight-to-video movie The Scorpion King 2: Rise of a Warrior.

On September 8, 2010, Copon released "Let's Get Nasty" on iTunes and in the same year he appeared on a TV commercial ad as a spokesperson for an Asian TV station foundation called Bantay Bata. Copon starred in the thriller Killer Holiday, and he also produced and did stunts in the film. Copon is also a member of the Hollywood Knights celebrity basketball team which raises funds for various schools and charitable organizations in the Greater Los Angeles area.

In summer 2012, Copon started co-hosting a weekend radio show on Positive Hit Radio the Current, WJLZ 88.5 FM, in Virginia with Trina Olson called Saturday Night with Trina & Mike. The show airs Saturday nights from 5PM to 10PM ET and features Christian rock and hip hop music. The show is streamed live on the station's webpage.

Copon is executive producer of Michael Copon Studios.

== Personal life ==
Copon endorsed Donald Trump in the 2024 United States presidential election.

== Filmography ==
=== Film ===
Year	Title	Role	Notes
2005	Dishdogz	Palmer	
2006	All You've Got	Artie Sanchez	
2006	Elevator	Hot guy at party	
2007	Bring It On: In It to Win It	Penn	Direct-to-video
2008	The Scorpion King 2: Rise of a Warrior	Mathayus	Direct-to-video
2009	Dark House	Greg	
2010	Night of the Demons	Dex Thrilby	
2010	BoyBand	Brad	
2010	A Forgotten Innocence	Andrew	
2011	Killer Holiday	Spider	
2011	247°F	Michael	
2012	Music High	Tommy	
2013	Killer Holiday	Melvin 'Spider' Holiday	
2015	Awaken	Nick	
2016	Worth the Price	Jake Williams	
2018	Mad World	Nicholai	
2018	Affairs of State	Billy	
2023	1521	Lapu-Lapu	
2024	New Year's Absolution	Roy	
2025	Prisoner of War	Villanueva	Direct-to-video

=== Television ===
Year	Title	Role	Notes
2001	Power Rangers Time Force	Lucas Kendall/Blue Time Force Ranger	Main role
2002	Power Rangers Wild Force	Lucas Kendall/Blue Time Force Ranger	Episodes: "Reinforcements from the Future: Part 1 and Part 2"
2003	Even Stevens	Boy at beach	Episode: "Surf's Up"
2004–2005	One Tree Hill	Felix Taggaro	Recurring role (season 2), 11 episodes
2005	Scrubs	Pedro	Episode: "My Big Move"
2005	Reno 911!	Kane	Episode: "Dangle's Son"
2005	But Can They Sing?	Himself	Contestant – won competition
2005–2006	That's So Raven	Ricky	Episodes: "Boyz 'N Commotion", "Be Prepared"
2006	Sideliners	Joey Ambrose	Television film
2006–2009	Beyond the Break	Vin Keahi	Recurring role
2008	Greek	Shane	Episodes: "Barely Legal" and "Mr. Purr-fect"
2009	CSI: Miami	Walter Leeson	Episode: "Head Case"
2010	Hawaii Five-0	Junior Satele	Episode: "Malama Ka Aina"
2011	Kourtney and Kim Take New York	Himself	1 episode
2018–2020	The Bay	Colton Kurosaki	Web series; recurring role
2020	Beaus of Holly	Phil	Television film

=== Video games ===
- Power Rangers Time Force (2001) as Blue Ranger

=== As a producer ===
- Killer Holiday (2013) – Producer
- Fearless (2015) – Producer
