= Madison Calley =

United States harpist

- Born: November 22, 1991 (age 34); Washington, DC, United States
- Education: Carnegie Mellon University
- Notable work: ETHEREAL (2021 covers album)
- Style: Classically trained soul harpist

Madison Calley (born November 22, 1991) is an American harpist. Calley, a graduate of Carnegie Mellon University, gained mass exposure and notoriety through the creation of viral covers of contemporary music performed on her harp. Calley has become credited as one of few musicians actively breaking barriers and broadening the scope of inclusion within the classical space.

Calley has been highlighted as a pioneer in reforming classical musicianship in Vogue, Rolling Stone, The New York Times, Grammy Awards and Business Insider.

Calley's work has also led to her being invited to perform at the 94th Academy Awards with Beyonce, the 95th Academy Awards with Rihanna, the 2021 iHeartRadio Music Awards with Usher, the Greek Theater with Alicia Keys and HER, the 63rd Annual Grammy Awards and the 2021 BET Awards with Roddy Ricch, as well as the Latin Grammy Awards with Karol G.

In March 2024, Calley made her big screen debut in the Mario Van Peebles western film, Outlaw Posse.

== Early life ==
Madison Calley was born on November 22, in Washington, DC. Her parents, both civil rights attorneys, placed great emphasis on ensuring she and her siblings received well-rounded educations. Calley began gymnastics, swimming, and ice-skating by age 2. She selected the harp at age four, after witnessing a harpist performing Disney songs at a restaurant with her family. She began private piano lessons at age 6 to learn fundamental music theory before transitioning to lever harp at age 8. She first began harp lessons at the Washington DC Youth Orchestra before switching to private instruction under the late Jeanne Chalifoux.

Throughout her early life, Calley experienced numerous instances of rejection and outcasting; especially within the classical community. She describes often finding herself to be one of the only people of color amongst her peers. This rejection, combined with her instructor's strict classical curriculum, made both learning and finding passion for the instrument very difficult. She credits her mother for refusing to let her give up on her musical pursuit.

Calley leaned on influences from artists such as Alicia Keys, Lauryn Hill, Beyonce, Sade, Jill Scott, and Erykah Badu throughout her youth. By age 17, Calley attended Carnegie Mellon University and majored in Harp Performance. Upon graduating, she relocated to Los Angeles, CA to pursue a career in entertainment and fashion design.

== Career ==
Calley's love for performing soul music on the harp was sparked after an acoustic performance with Willow Smith. She became fascinated with the intersections between classical instrumentation and contemporary music.

After the stay at home order was issued for the COVID-19 pandemic, Calley began fusing her love for fashion and music by creating covers of contemporary R&B, pop, hip hop, and jazz songs, while featuring many of her own fashion designs. With each video, she slowly began curating her unique aesthetic of being surrounded by lush tropical plants and natural sunlight.

Calley was invited to record on Ariana Grande's song "Shut Up" from her album Positions. The album reached #1 on the Billboard Hot 200 list and was nominated for a Grammy award for Best Pop Vocal Album and an American Music Award for Favorite Pop/Rock Album.

Calley's cover of "If I Ain't Got You" went viral after it was reposted to Alicia Keys's Instagram account. Calley quickly began gaining the attention of some of the world biggest artists, publications, and music industry leaders.

Producers from the Latin Grammy Awards invited Calley to play in the 2020 awards show. Calley led the orchestral opening with a solo for the Colombian singer-songwriter, Karol G’s, performance of "Tusa", which was nominated for Song of the Year.

In February 2021, Calley appeared on Season 6 Episode 4 of the ABC TV show To Tell The Truth hosted by Anthony Anderson.

Calley also appeared onstage for the 63rd annual Grammy Awards broadcast with rapper Roddy Ricch to perform his song "Heartless".

During the COVID-19 pandemic, Calley also began her journey of mentorship by taking on a group of students of all demographics, hoping to make harp education more accessible and to instil a sense of enthusiasm for the classical instrument that she was unable to feel as a youth.

By May 2021, Calley was invited by Usher to perform his classic hit "Confessions" for his iHeartRadio Music Awards performance.

The same month, Calley was interviewed for Rolling Stone Magazine in an article titled 'How Madison Calley — and Her Harp — Made History'. The article highlight the ways in which Calley has dismantled barriers as a woman of color at a time when less than five percent of orchestral musicians in the U.S. are BIPOC.

The following month, Calley was invited to perform "Late At Night" with Roddy Ricch at the 2021 BET Awards.

Madison Calley's achievements were celebrated and highlighted by Forbes Magazine in November 2021. The article discussed Calley's social entrepreneurship, award show performances, and her initiative to make a more inclusive ecosystem for musicians.'

In December 2021, Calley released her first covers album ETHEREAL with distribution label, Platoon.

Calley also released an original 30 minute meditation piece titled "Just A Thought" for Calm App's estimated 4.5 million monthly listeners.

By May 2022, Calley was invited to perform at the 94th Academy Awards with Beyonce.

In August 2022, Calley was invited by Alicia Keys to perform during her Alicia + Keys World Tour show at the Greek Theatre in Los Angeles. Calley was joined on stage by both Alicia Keys and H.E.R.

Calley was approached by film director Mario Van Peebles to audition for his western Outlaw Posse. By July 2022 she was cast for the role of Malindy, a talented music teacher held for ransom. The film stars Whoopi Goldberg, Cedric the Entertainer, Mario Van Peebles, Neal McDonough, John Carroll Lynch, and more. The movie filmed in Montana and was released in theaters March 2024.

During the filming of Outlaw Posse, Calley was invited to perform with singer-songwriter Maxwell at Rihanna's 4th annual Savage x Fenty Show.

Calley rang in the 2023 New Year at the Disney Castle on the Dick Clark's New Year's Rockin' Eve stage with Halle Bailey for her performance of Janet Jackson's "Together Again" and "Cool People."

In March 2023, Calley made her second Oscar Awards appearance as she joined Rihanna's performance of "Lift Me Up" at the 95th Academy Awards.

Calley made her Vogue Magazine debut on her birthday in the 'Devotion' fragrance campaign for fashion brand Dolce & Gabbana. The publication featured Madison Calley in an editorial style video and article discussing what devotion means to her. The article was published in Vogue Magazine, British Vogue, Vogue España, and Vogue Italia.

Calley joined The Little Mermaid star, Halle Bailey, again for an acoustic performance of her single 'Angel' in October 2023 for YouTube.

To close the year, Calley performed an original song titled "The Infinite Clock of Dreams" at the 2023 TIME Person of the Year event alongside Grammy Award winning spoken word artist J Ivy. The event was held to honor Taylor Swift.

== Harp technique ==
Calley has made a name for herself through her unique harp technique. She is typically seen performing in high heels or shifting pedals on her tiptoes in colorful attire, often designed by herself. She describes her method as one that combines Salzedo method, French method, and a touch of her own flare. As mentioned in her interview with Vogue, Calley is not attempting to veer away from classical tradition, but is instead working to expand the world's overall perception of a harpist and harp music.
