= Gang in Blue =

1996 film by Mario Van Peebles and Melvin Van Peebles

- DVD cover
- Directed by: Melvin Van Peebles; Mario Van Peebles
- Produced by: Lee Mayes; Neal Moritz
- Release date: 1996
- Running time: 99 minutes
- Country: United States
- Language: English

Gang in Blue is a 1996 American television film co-directed by Melvin Van Peebles and his son, Mario Van Peebles, about a black police officer who discovers a cell of white supremacist vigilantes within his department.

== Cast ==
- Mario Van Peebles as Michael Rhodes
- Josh Brolin as Keith DeBruler
- Melvin Van Peebles as Andre Speier
- Cynda Williams as Anita Boyard
- Stephen Lang as "Moose" Tavola
- J. T. Walsh as Lieutenant William Eyler
- Sean McCann as Clute Mirkovich
- Zach Grenier as Joe Beckstrem

== Release ==
The film aired on Showtime on September 8, 1996. A home video release followed on March 11, 1997 which coincided with an encore Showtime broadcast.
