= Outlaw Posse (film) =

- Theatrical release poster
- Directed by: Mario Van Peebles
- Written by: Mario Van Peebles
- Produced by: Joshua Russell; Gerald T. Olson; Swen Temmel; Meadow Williams; Kip Konwiser
- Starring: Mario Van Peebles; Whoopi Goldberg; Cedric the Entertainer; Edward James Olmos; John Carroll Lynch; William Mapother; M. Emmet Walsh; Cam Gigandet; Allen Payne; Neal McDonough; Mandela Van Peebles; D.C. Young Fly; Amber Reign Smith; Jake Manley; Joseph Culp; Brian Presley; Sean Bridgers
- Cinematography: Kurt E. Soderling
- Edited by: Andrew Shearer
- Music by: Dontae Winslow
- Production companies: Konwiser Brothers Entertainment; Iris Indie International; Diamond Films; Good Folk Films; MVP Entertainment Management
- Distributed by: Quiver Distribution
- Release date: March 1, 2024
- Running time: 108 minutes
- Country: United States
- Language: English

Outlaw Posse is a 2024 American western film written by, directed by and starring Mario Van Peebles. It also stars Whoopi Goldberg, Cedric the Entertainer, Edward James Olmos, John Carroll Lynch, William Mapother, Cam Gigandet, Allen Payne, Neal McDonough, and M. Emmet Walsh in his final film role before his death on March 19, 2024.

The film was released on March 1, 2024.

== Cast ==
- Mario Van Peebles as Chief
- Whoopi Goldberg as Mary "Stagecoach Mary"
- Cedric the Entertainer as Horatio
- Edward James Olmos as Ossie
- John Carroll Lynch as Carson
- William Mapother as Angel
- M. Emmet Walsh as "Catfish"
- Cam Gigandet as Caprice
- Allen Payne as Jeremiah
- Neal McDonough as Bart
- Mandela Van Peebles as Decker, Chief's Son
- Madison Calley as Malindy
- D.C. Young Fly as "Spooky"
- Amber Reign Smith as Queenie
- Jake Manley as "Southpaw"
- Joseph Culp as Sheriff
- Brian Presley as "Shotgun"
- Sean Bridgers as Mayor

== Production ==
In July 2019, it was announced that Van Peebles would write, direct and star in the film.

In November 2022, it was announced that filming had wrapped in Montana.

== Release ==
Outlaw Posse was released in the United States in select cinemas on March 1, 2024.

== Reception ==
On the review aggregator website Rotten Tomatoes, 44% of 18 critics' reviews are positive, with an average rating of 5.4/10.
