= Reginald the Vampire =

2022 Syfy television series

- Also known as: Reginald (premiere)
- Genre: Comedy
- Created by: Harley Peyton
- Based on: Fat Vampire by Johnny B. Truant
- Starring: Jacob Batalon; Mandela Van Peebles; Em Haine; Thailey Roberge; Georgia Waters; Marguerite Hanna; Aren Buchholz; Savannah Basley; Sean Yves Lessard
- Composer: Adam Lastiwka
- Country of origin: United States
- Original language: English
- No. of seasons: 2
- No. of episodes: 20

Production
- Executive producers: Harley Peyton; Jeremiah S. Chechik; Julile DeCresce; Lindsay Macadam; Todd Berger
- Running time: 44 minutes
- Production companies: Cineflix Rights; Modern Story Company; Great Pacific Media

Original release
- Network: Syfy
- Release: October 5, 2022 – July 10, 2024

Reginald the Vampire (simply known as Reginald in its premiere episode) is an American comedy horror television series which premiered on Syfy on October 5, 2022. The series stars Jacob Batalon as overweight vampire Reginald Andres. In January 2023, the series was renewed for a second season which premiered on May 8, 2024. In July 2024, the series was cancelled after two seasons.

== Cast and characters ==
- Jacob Batalon as Reginald Andres, the protagonist who works at The Slushy Shack, who's turned into a vampire to save his life.
- Mandela Van Peebles as Maurice Miller, Reginald's maker who was turned into a vampire by Angela in Oakland, California, in 1972.
- Em Haine as Sarah Kinney, Reginald's co-worker and the object of his affection.
- Christin Park as Nikki, a vampire assassin who loves severely maiming her targets. She's hired by Angela to kill Reginald, and ends up falling for him. She later falls for Ashley and they start a relationship.
- Aren Buchholz as Todd, Reginald's boss who loves to mock Reginald about his weight. He briefly becomes Reginald's main source of blood.
- Savannah Basley as Angela, a centuries old vampire who's upset about Maurice turning Reginald, and works to destroy them both.
- Thailey Roberge as Claire, a frequent regular at The Slushy Shack, who knows Reginald's a vampire. Later, it's revealed that she's half-incubus.
- Marguerite Hanna as Ashley, Reginald's co-worker who suspects there are vampires in the city and works to prove their existence. She becomes aware that vampires exist, and becomes an ally to Reginald and his fellow vampires. She later starts a relationship with Nikki.
- Ryan Jinn as Mike, a vampire saved by Angela, who spies on Maurice. He later starts a relationship with Todd, and refuses to turn him into a vampire when constantly asked.
- Georgia Waters as Penelope, a vampire who works for Angela.
- Sean Yves Lessard as Lebron, Penelope's vampire partner who also works for Angela.
- Danny Wattley as Abraham, an ancient vampire that Reginald saves from a time loop.
- Julian Richings as Logan the Unquenchable, head of the vampire council.
- Max Montesi as Uriel (season 2), an angel first sent to kill Reginald and the other vampires. He later decides to help save them when their pending eradication is revealed.
- Françoise Robertson as Ann Dufresne, Claire's mother.
- Jed Rees as Altus, an incubus.
- Kaylah Zander as Justine, a vampire who offers to help Reginald and Maurice.

== Episodes ==
| Season | Episodes | Originally released | |
| Season | Episodes | First released | Last released |
|---|---|---|---|
| 1 | 10 | October 5, 2022 | December 7, 2022 |
| 2 | 10 | May 8, 2024 | July 10, 2024 |

=== Season 1 (2022) ===
| No. overall | No. in season | Title | Directed by | Written by | Original release date | U.S. viewers (millions) |
|---|---|---|---|---|---|---|
| 1 | 1 | "Dead Weight" | Jeremiah Chechik | Harley Peyton | October 5, 2022 | 0.294 |
| 2 | 2 | "The Hunger" | Jeremiah Chechik | Harley Peyton | October 12, 2022 | 0.175 |
| 3 | 3 | "Hypnos" | David Frazee | Alexandra Zorowny | October 19, 2022 | 0.166 |
| 4 | 4 | "All The Time in the World" | David Frazee | Alejandro Alcoba | October 26, 2022 | 0.166 |
| 5 | 5 | "Fools in Love" | Lee Rose | Priscilla White | November 2, 2022 | 0.163 |
| 6 | 6 | "Halfway to a Threeway" | Lee Rose | Shevon Singh | November 9, 2022 | N/A |
| 7 | 7 | "The Last Day of Our Acquaintance" | Siobhan Devine | Harley Peyton & Isabella Gutierrez | November 16, 2022 | N/A |
| 8 | 8 | "The Odyssey" | Siobhan Devine | Alexandra Zarowny | November 23, 2022 | 0.126 |
| 9 | 9 | "No One Dies for Failing the SATs" | Jeremiah Chechik | Alejandro Alcoba | November 30, 2022 | 0.158 |
| 10 | 10 | "Reginald Andres Beyond Thunderdome" | Jeremiah Chechik | Harley Peyton | December 7, 2022 | 0.241 |

=== Season 2 (2024) ===
| No. overall | No. in season | Title | Directed by | Written by | Original release date | U.S. viewers (millions) |
|---|---|---|---|---|---|---|
| 11 | 1 | "The Pompatus of Love" | Jeremiah Chechik | Harley Peyton | May 8, 2024 | 0.163 |
| 12 | 2 | "30 Days" | David Frazee | Alexandra Zarowny | May 15, 2024 | N/A |
| 13 | 3 | "The Truth About the Truth" | Jeremiah Chechik | Harley Peyton | May 22, 2024 | N/A |
| 14 | 4 | "Watch the Sunrise" | Siobhan Devine | Alejandro Alcoba | May 29, 2024 | N/A |
| 15 | 5 | "Undead Bedfellows" | David Frazee | Priscilla M. White | June 5, 2024 | N/A |
| 16 | 6 | "Blood, Sweat, and Glitter" | Siobhan Devine | Shevon Singh | June 12, 2024 | N/A |
| 17 | 7 | "Terminal Eternity" | Justin Wu | Alexandra Zarowny | June 19, 2024 | N/A |
| 18 | 8 | "We Can Be Heroes (Just for One Day)" | Brent Crowell | Harley Peyton | June 26, 2024 | 0.124 |
| 19 | 9 | "The Final Countdown" | Jeremiah Chechik | Alejandro Alcoba | July 3, 2024 | N/A |
| 20 | 10 | "Just Like Heaven" | Jeremiah Chechik | Harley Peyton | July 10, 2024 | N/A |

== Production ==
On August 5, 2021, it was announced that Syfy had ordered a ten episode contemporary adaptation of Johnny B. Truant's Fat Vampire book series.

On January 15, 2023, Syfy renewed the series for a second season, which premiered on May 8, 2024.

In one episode, Batalon spoke Ilocano language to trace his real life heritage, even using 'Andres' as Reginald's surname to honor his mother, Vangie. On July 15, 2024, Syfy cancelled the series after two seasons.

== Reception ==
The review aggregator website Rotten Tomatoes reports a 70% approval rating with an average rating of 6.7/10, based on 10 critic reviews. The website's critics consensus reads, "Reginald doesn't particularly stand out in the already crowded vampire genre, but Jacob Batalon invests his hapless protagonist with enough charm to make this spunky series worth a bite."

Metacritic, which uses a weighted average, assigned a score of 63 out of 100 based on 7 critics, indicating "generally favorable reviews". The website's highest scoring critics' reviews were from Collider's Maggie Boccella who wrote "Those who enjoyed Warehouse 13 or the American version of Being Human growing up will certainly love the quirkiness Reginald the Vampire has to offer, and if given a Season 2, the series could only serve to grow, embracing its human characters as much as its undead ones."; Robert Lloyd of the Los Angeles Times wrote "Feels like a kind of tonal companion piece to Syfy's great Resident Alien, with its winning combination of comedy, suspense, likable characters and real feeling."; Alexis Gunderson of Consequence who wrote "Its pacing could be more consistent, both in the macro sense (e.g., how the mythology all fits together) and the micro (e.g., where and how specific punchlines land). That said, if you're looking for a spooky season show to decompress with on a weekly basis, or a fun, low-stakes binge to save up for Halloween weekend, Reginald the Vampire is your man."; and Joel Keller of Decider who wrote "The first episode is more heartfelt than hilarious, but there's enough of the former for us to forgive the lack of the latter."
