= Prisoner of War (2025 film) =

- Release poster
- Directed by: Louis Mandylor
- Screenplay by: Marc Clebanoff
- Story by: Scott Adkins
- Produced by: Marc Clebanoff; Brandon Menchen; Louis Mandylor; Michael Copon; Scott Adkins; Gregory Segal
- Starring: Scott Adkins; Peter Shinkoda; Michael Copon; Gabbi Garcia; Donald Cerrone
- Cinematography: Niccolò de la Fère
- Edited by: Austin Nordell
- Music by: Tasos Eliopoulos
- Production companies: Odyssey Motion Pictures; Brand in Motion; Reality MM Studios; Myriad Entertainment Corp
- Distributed by: Well Go USA Entertainment
- Release dates: April 3, 2025 (Beverly Hills Film Festival); September 19, 2025 (VOD)
- Running time: 112 minutes
- Countries: United States; Philippines
- Languages: English; Filipino; Japanese

Prisoner of War (formerly titled Death March) is a 2025 martial arts war film directed by Louis Mandylor and written by Marc Clebanoff, based on a story by Scott Adkins. The film features Adkins alongside Peter Shinkoda, Donald Cerrone, Michael Copon, and Gabbi Garcia. Produced by Odyssey Motion Pictures and distributed by Well Go USA Entertainment, it combines martial arts action with a World War II prisoner-of-war narrative. It premiered at the Beverly Hills Film Festival in April 2025 and had a limited theatrical and digital release in the United States on September 19, 2025.

Set during the Battle of Bataan, the plot centers on British RAF officer Wing Commander James Wright (Adkins), who is captured by Japanese forces and confined to a harsh POW camp in the Philippines. There, Wright is forced into hand-to-hand combat matches for his captors’ amusement. Using his prior martial arts training, he motivates resistance among fellow prisoners while devising a bold escape plan.

The film received mixed to positive critical feedback, with praise for Adkins’s performance and the fight choreography, though the narrative depth and supporting characters faced criticism. Reviewers highlighted its fusion of war epic and martial arts elements, with some calling it a raw, visceral take on the genre.

== Plot ==
In 1942, during the Battle of Bataan in World War II, Royal Air Force Wing Commander James Wright is shot down over the Philippines during a combat mission. Captured by Japanese forces, he is taken to a prisoner-of-war camp where Allied soldiers face forced labor, starvation, and daily brutality under Lt. Col. Benjiro Ito's command. Ito orders his right-hand man Captain Hirano to execute Wright, but Wright kills Hirano and two of his soldiers before escaping but is quickly apprehended again.

Wright learns that camp officers organize underground fighting matches, forcing prisoners to fight for their captors' entertainment. Initially hesitant, he is pressured to participate after seeing resisters executed. His prior martial arts training in Hong Kong gives him an advantage in the brutal contests as he managed to defeat the best martial artist in the camp Koji, though his successes draw the ire of Ito and his enforcer, Captain Endo. Ito even going as far as to execute his troops who failed to defeat Wright. Ito realizes that that Wright's martial art techniques are forbidden, which makes him interests in him and even recognizes the master martial artist that trained Wright.

As the fights intensify, Wright forms bonds with fellow prisoners, including Captain Collins and Sergeant Gabriel Villanueva. Collins informs him that they will be transferred to a far worse prison within a week so they have to escape. He also receives secret help from Theresa, a local nurse forced to work at the camp, who provides medical support to the prisoners. Together, they plan a daring escape, intending to deliver intelligence on Japanese troop movements to the outside.

James manages to steal a radio from the camp and sneaks outside to call US reinforcement for help. Later on, he talks with Collin and Villanueva that the US reinforcement is coming so they should take the advantages of the upcoming air raids to escape. At the same time, Ito is stressed at the potential forthcoming US reinforcement.

As Ito starts to execute more prisoners for the sake of brutality, James, Colin, and Villanueva decide to accelerate the plan to escape. They sneak outside to inspect a downed glider as a mean to escape. However, since Colin killed a guard during their sneak out, he is executed the other days.

When the Allied Air Force starts bombarding the camp, James, Theresa and Villanueva try to escape the camp. James faces Ito and defeats him. Out of respect for James as a martial artist, Ito stops his men from killing James when he and his group escape.

At some point in 1950, James breaks into the Ito Dojo and confronts Sensei Shunsuke Ito, inquiring about his father, Benjiro Ito. Shunsuke reveals that his father died years ago from illness and asks James to demonstrate his forbidden technique. James defeats Shunsuke, and Shunsuke returns James the medallion Ito stole from James years ago.

== Cast ==
- Scott Adkins as James Wright
- Peter Shinkoda as Lt. Col. Benjiro Ito
- Donald Cerrone as Captain Collins
- Michael Copon as Sgt. Gabriel Villanueva
- Michael Rene Walton as The Beard
- Gary Cairns as Jonesy
- Gabbi Garcia as Theresa
- Masanori Mimoto as Captain Endo
- Shane Kosugi as Corporal Hirano
- Atsuki Kashio as Hiroshi
- Kansuki Yokoi as Shunsuke Ito
- Koji Hironaka as Guard 1
- Johnson Baronia as Guard 2
- Sol Eugenio as Japanese soldier
- Pauline Lopez as Ana

== Production ==
In August 2024, it was announced that Adkins was starring in a new film called Death March, directed by Louis Mandylor. Principal photography started from the last week of July and into late of August 2024.

== Release ==
=== Festival screenings ===
Prisoner of War had a special screening on April 3, 2025 at the TCL Chinese theatre, hosted by the Beverly Hills Film Festival. At the Big Bad Film Fest in Glendale, California, that had been screened on 22 August. It was shown on 30 August, at California Railroad Museum in Sacramento, hosted by Sacramento International Film Festival.

=== Home release ===
Well Go USA released the film on VOD on September 19, 2025, in the United States. In the United Kingdom, it will be released on DVD, Blu-Ray, and digital by Kaleidoscope Home Entertainment on November 10, 2025.

== Reception ==
Roger Ebert.com critic Simon Abrams described the film as a showcase for Adkins’s action prowess. He praised the fight choreography and Adkins’s intense screen presence, while critiquing the underdeveloped narrative and secondary characters, noting it resembles a “Cannon-made Bronson picture.” Cityonfire.com rated the film highly (4½ out of 5), calling it “pure, unfiltered and savage Scott Adkins at his bruising best”, and commending the fusion of WW II thriller and Bloodsport-style combat.

== See also ==
- Bataan Death March
- Battle of Bataan
