= 1521 (film) =

2023 historical drama film

- Theatrical release poster
- Directed by: Michael Barder
- Written by: Mary Krell-Oishi
- Story by: Francis B. Lara Ho
- Produced by: Francis B. Lara Ho
- Starring: Danny Trejo; Bea Alonzo; Costas Mandylor; Michael Copon; Hector David Jr.; Maricel Laxa; Vic Romano; Floyd Tena; Larissa Buendia
- Cinematography: Michael Barder; Patrick Ferrer
- Edited by: Michael Barder; Stephen Wollwerth; Rembrandt Floresca
- Production company: Inspire Studios
- Distributed by: Viva Films
- Release dates: June 12, 2023 (Los Angeles); June 5, 2024 (Philippines)
- Running time: 90 minutes
- Countries: Philippines; United States
- Languages: Filipino; English; Spanish

1521 (also known in United States as 1521: The Quest for Love and Freedom) is a 2023 historical drama film written by Mary Krell-Oishi and directed by Michael Barder. A Philippine-American co-production, it stars Danny Trejo, Bea Alonzo, Costas Mandylor, Michael Copon, Hector David Jr., Maricel Laxa, Vic Romano, Floyd Tena, Larissa Buendia. The film is based on the 1521 encounter of explorer Ferdinand Magellan and his crew, who were serving the Spanish Empire, with Lapulapu and other pre-Hispanic Philippine natives, as well as the love story between a native princess and one of Magellan's men.

== Plot ==
A woman experiences a dream depicting what is implied to be a flashback from her previous life.

In 1521, Spaniards led by Ferdinand Magellan arrive in Cebu seeking to establish colonial rule and develop trade relations with its leader, Raja Humabon. While Humabon is willing to accommodate the Spaniards in the hopes of increased prosperity, Lapu-Lapu, the ruler of the neighboring island of Mactan, refuses to accept their loss of independence. In an effort to convince Lapu-Lapu, Magellan and Humabon arrange for the former's interpreter, a Hispanized Malay slave named Enrique, to live in Mactan as their intermediary. Lapu-Lapu treats Enrique as a guest, while the latter develops a romance with Mactan's babaylan, Diwata. However, her brother, Lapulapu's chief soldier Udong, is wary of the Spaniards' intentions and threatens Enrique over his relationship with Diwata. Despite this, Enrique becomes sympathetic with Mactan and advises Magellan to treat its inhabitants with respect, while trying to convince Lapu-Lapu to submit peacefully.

Enrique's efforts are undermined when a group of Spanish soldiers led by Lorenzo loot a village, forcing Magellan to order the flogging of one of those involved to avert a conflict. Eventually, Lapu-Lapu breaks off negotiations when he, Diwata and Udong attend Humabon's baptism ceremony, during which the latter and his people are made to kneel before a cross and burn icons of their gods. An offended Diwata runs away, while Enrique is warned off by Udong from pursuing her. Later, Diwata reconciles with Enrique and pledges her love, leading to them agreeing to elope to the village of Buaya. Arriving there, Diwata comes across the village being looted by Spanish soldiers and is knocked unconscious by Lorenzo, who steals her necklace. Enrique, who is in Diwata's village at the time of the attack, is told to leave by Lapu-Lapu for his own safety. Diwata, again feeling betrayed following the attack on Buaya, returns to her village, but is told that Enrique had been looking for her, restoring her faith in him and prompting her to run off again in search for Enrique.

Enrique makes a futile attempt to convince Magellan not to go to war with Lapu-Lapu, but accompanies him anyway to battle. Arriving at a beach, Enrique then appeals one last time to Lapu-Lapu to surrender, which the latter refuses. The ensuing battle results in heavy losses for both sides, culminating in Magellan being badly wounded by Lapu-Lapu before being finished off by his men. Enrique is captured but is spared at the last minute after Diwata runs to his side and pleads for his life. Lapu-Lapu allows her to see Enrique off at the shoreline to be with his comrades. However, Enrique snatches Diwata's necklace from Lorenzo and runs back to return it to her. Lorenzo fires a gun at the couple, but is then killed by Udong with a spear. The bullet hits Enrique, who dies in Diwata's arms.

In the present, the woman wakes up and embraces her partner, who is implied to be a reincarnation of Enrique.

== Cast ==
- Danny Trejo as Ferdinand Magellan
- Bea Alonzo as Diwata
- Costas Mandylor as Lorenzo
- Michael Copon as Lapu-Lapu
- Hector David Jr. as Enrique
- Maricel Laxa as Ahmani
- Vic Romano as Udong
- Floyd Tena as Humabon
- Larissa Buendia as Humamai
- Sol Eugenio as Datu
- Eren Kereci as Spanish Soldier

== Production ==
On August 4, 2022, Bea Alonzo was confirmed to be part of the film. The film had a working title 1521: The Battle of Mactan. Shooting was held in Puerto Princesa and Taytay, Palawan.

== Controversies ==
=== Issues with Bea Alonzo ===
The production and release of the film was marred by controversy between the lead actress Bea Alonzo and the film crew. Among these were allegations such as Alonzo bringing along additional staff to her provided accommodations and the resulting disputes over costs, problems with her costume and what the producers said were "unreasonable" demands from Alonzo. Entertainment reporter Ogie Diaz also said that a real Bolo knife used in the film ended up injuring several actors.

Producer Francis Ho subsequently apologized to Alonzo for these issues, which he attributed to his being a first-time producer. Alonzo did not attend the movie's premier night on May 29, 2024.

=== Historical inaccuracies ===
The film was criticized for its historical inaccuracies such as in costumes, armor and language. Some also criticised Bea Alonzo's casting as a native princess, stating that she looked more like one of the colonizers than a local, and also Danny Trejo as Magellan for the inverse reason.

== Release ==
The film had a limited release in United States on October 2, 2023. Made in time for the 125th Philippine Independence Day in 2023, the movie was screened in Philippine cinemas on June 5, 2024.

1521 premiered at SM Seaside City in Cebu City on May 30. Lapu-Lapu City Mayor Junard Chan praised the film, adding along with his wife Representative Maria Cynthia “Cindi” King-Chan that the film placed one of its settings in Barangay Buaya.

== Reception ==
=== Critical response ===
The movie received a score of 42/100 from 5 reviews according to review aggregator website Kritikultura, indicating generally unfavorable reviews.

=== Accolades ===
Year	Awards	Category	Recipient	Result	Ref.
2023	London Independent Film Awards	Best Feature Film	1521	Won	
2023	Athens International Monthly Art Film Festival	Best Feature Film	1521	Won	
2023	Sweden Film Awards	Best Feature Film	1521	Won	
2023	Sweden Film Awards	Best Cinematography Feature	1521	Won	

== See also ==
- Lapu-Lapu, a 2002 Filipino film about the same event
