= Johnny B. Truant =

American science fiction and fantasy writer

- Occupation: Writer
- Website: www.johnnybtruant.com

Johnny B. Truant is an American multi-genre writer specialising in science fiction and fantasy stories, best known for the Fat Vampire series.

== Life and career ==
Johnny B. Truant wrote his first book, The Bialy Pimps, in 1999, then published it in 2011. He's continued writing since, publishing an average of a million words of fiction per year.

Johnny was previously the host and co-creator of The Self Publishing Podcast, along with Sean Platt and David W. Wright.

== Personal life ==
Originally from Ohio, Truant and his family live in Austin, Texas.

== Works ==
=== Novels ===
Fat Vampire Chronicles series:

- Fat Vampire series:
  1. Fat Vampire (2012), ISBN 9781629550015
  2. Fat Vampire 2: Tastes Like Chicken (2012), ISBN 9781301184705
  3. Fat Vampire 3: All You Can Eat (2012), ISBN 9781629551333
  4. Fat Vampire 4: Harder Better Fatter Stronger (2013), ISBN 9781301821761
  5. Fat Vampire 5: Fatpocalypse (2013), ISBN 9781301670437
  6. Fat Vampire 6: Survival of the Fattest (2013), ISBN 9781629550060
  - Game of Fangs (2020), ISBN 9798201233396
- The Vampire Maurice series:
  1. The Vampire Maurice (2019), ASIN B07MCHBHTD
  2. Anarchy and Blood (2019), ASIN B07S942T3D
  3. Vampires in the White City (2019), ASIN B07TCR2X6S
  4. Fangs and Fame (2022), ASIN B0BHV6BRHY

Unicorn Western series, with Sean Platt:

1. Unicorn Western (2012), novella, ISBN 9781301220571
2. Unicorn Western 2, or The Wanderers (2013), novella, ASIN B00B3NF6CK
3. Unicorn Western 3, or A Fistful Of Magic (2013), novella, ASIN B00BBMG23K
4. Unicorn Western 4, or Shimmer To Yuma (2013), novella, ASIN B00BXUSL02
5. Unicorn Western 5, or The Man Who Shot Alan Whitney (2013), novella, ASIN B00D39OZKQ
6. Unicorn Western 6, or The Spectacular Seven (2013), novella, ASIN B00DO7TW2I
7. Unicorn Western 7, or Open Meadows (2013), novella, ASIN B00E5JJVG6
8. Unicorn Western 8, or The Unforgotten (2013), novella, ASIN B00EKT80YK
9. Unicorn Western 9, or The Magic Bunch (2013), novella, ASIN B00EL3JOE0
- Prequels:
  - Unicorn Genesis, or Unicorn Genesis: Origins (2013), ASIN B00FRKL5AW
  - Unicorn Western: The Outlaw Hassle Stone (2013), ASIN B00H6L327E

The Beam universe:

- Plugged: How Hyperconnectivity and The Beam Changed How We Think (2013), with Sterling Gibson and Sean Platt, ASIN B00GC456F2
- The Beam series, with Sean Platt:
  1. The Beam: Season One, or The Beam: The First Season (2013), ISBN 9781629550008
  2. The Beam: Season Two, or The Beam: The Complete Second Season (2014), ISBN 9781629551173
  3. The Beam: Season Three (2015), ASIN B016NM415I
  - Future Proof (coming soon)

The Inevitable universe:

- The Inevitable series, with Sean Platt:
  1. Robot Proletariat, or Robot Proletariat: Season One (2013), ASIN B00KN17ODC
  2. The Infinite Loop (2018), ASIN B07DQXF7GK
  3. The Hard Reset (2018), ASIN B07GTTMRKW
  4. Cascade Failure (2020), ASIN B088BDPNNT
  5. Reboot (2020), ASIN B08CBT26B9
  - En3my (2021), ISBN 9798201704827

The Dream Engine series, with Sean Platt:

1. The Dream Engine (2014), ISBN 1629550272
2. The Nightmare Factory (2015), ISBN 9781629550503
3. The Ruby Room (2016), ISBN 9781629550947
- The Tinkerer's Mainspring (2021), ISBN 9798201227036

Invasion universe, with Sean Platt:

- Alien Invasion series:
  1. Invasion (2015), ISBN 9781629550435
  2. Contact (2015), ISBN 9781629550466
  3. Colonization (2015), ISBN 9781629550497
  4. Annihilation (2015), ISBN 9781629550695
  5. Judgment (2016), ISBN 9781629550930
  6. Extinction (2016), ISBN 9781629550978
  7. Resurrection (2016), ISBN 9781629551029
  - Longshot (2020), ASIN B08MSQP78S
- Save the Humans series:
  1. Save the City (2019), ISBN 9781074357948
  2. Save the Girl (2019), ISBN 9781074362089
  3. Save the World (2019), ISBN 9781074387631
  - Conundrum (2019), novella, ASIN B07R7D52PX

Dead World series, with Sean Platt:

1. Dead City (2016), ISBN 9781629551012
2. Dead Nation (2020), ASIN B08L2JD8ZC
3. Dead Planet (2020), ASIN B08MWM9JLQ
- Dead Zero (2020), ISBN 9798201628802
- "Empty Nest" (2021), short story, ASIN B09JQ9J2FT

The Tomorrow Gene series, with Sean Platt:

1. The Tomorrow Gene (2017), ISBN 9798201466398
2. The Eden Experiment (2017), ISBN 9798201026608
3. The Tomorrow Clone (2017), ISBN 9798201704414
- Null Identity (2021), ISBN 9798201661090

Part of the Version Control series:

- 4. Screenplay (2020), with Sean Platt, ASIN B07VSV44DS
- Sick and Wired (2020), with Avery Blake, novella, ASIN B08478ZXMD

Stand-alones:

- The Bialy Pimps (2012), ISBN 9781484093917
- Everyone Gets Divorced, or Everyone Gets Divorced: Episode 1 (2013), with Sean Platt, ISBN 9781301269648
- Greens, or Greens: Episode 1 (2013), with Sean Platt, ISBN 9781311838728
- Namaste, or Vengeance (2013), with Sean Platt, ISBN 9781310294778
- Space Shuttle: Season One (2013), with Sean Platt, ASIN B00D71ZVVM
- Axis of Aaron (2014), with Sean Platt, ISBN 9781629550336
- Terms of Service (2014), with Sean Platt, novella
- Cursed: The Box Set, or Cursed: The Full Saga (2015), with Sean Platt, ASIN B017PKI3Q0
- Devil May Care (2016), with Sean Platt, ISBN 9781629550992
- La Fleur de Blanc (2017), with Sean Platt, ISBN 9781629551210
- Pretty Killer (2019), with Nolon King, ISBN 9781675994337
- The Future of Sex (2019), with Sean Platt, ISBN 9781694373557
- Pattern Black (2022), with Sean Platt, ISBN 9798201556150
- The Target (2022), with Nolon King, ISBN 9798201506872
- Burnout (2022), with Sean Platt, ISBN 9798201956516
- The Island (2023), with Sean Platt, ASIN B0BRTD8Z4X

=== Short stories ===
Collections:

- Infinite Pieces (2017), with Sean Platt, ASIN B076QDKBWX, collection of 3 short stories, 1 novella and 1 novel:
  "Decoy Wallet", "Infinite Doors", "Caveman Timecop", Unicorn Western (novella; Unicorn Western series #1), Fat Vampire (novel; Fat Vampire series #1)

=== Non-fiction ===
Self-help

- Choose to be outstanding or choose to continue to suck (2010)
- Epic series:
  - Disobey (2011), ISBN 9781301514496
  - How to Live Forever (2012), ISBN 9781301318094
  - The Universe Doesn't Give a Flying Fuck About You (2012), ISBN 9781476359762
  - You Are Dying, and Your World Is a Lie (2012), ISBN 9781301136001
- How To Be Legendary (2012)
- The Story Solution (2019), with Sean Platt, ISBN 9781075449789

Writing

- Write. Publish. Repeat. (2013), with Sean Platt and David W. Wright, ISBN 9781629550145
- Fiction Unboxed: How Two Authors Wrote and Published a Book in 30 Days, From Scratch, In Front of the World (2014), with Sean Platt, ISBN 9781629550343
- Iterate And Optimize: Optimize Your Creative Business for Profit (2016), with Sean Platt and David W. Wright, ISBN 9781629550763
- The One With All the Writing Advice (2016), with Sean Platt, ISBN 9781629550985

== Adaptations ==
- Reginald the Vampire (2022), series created by Harley Peyton, based on series of novels Fat Vampire
