= Mandela Van Peebles =

American actor and producer (born 1994)

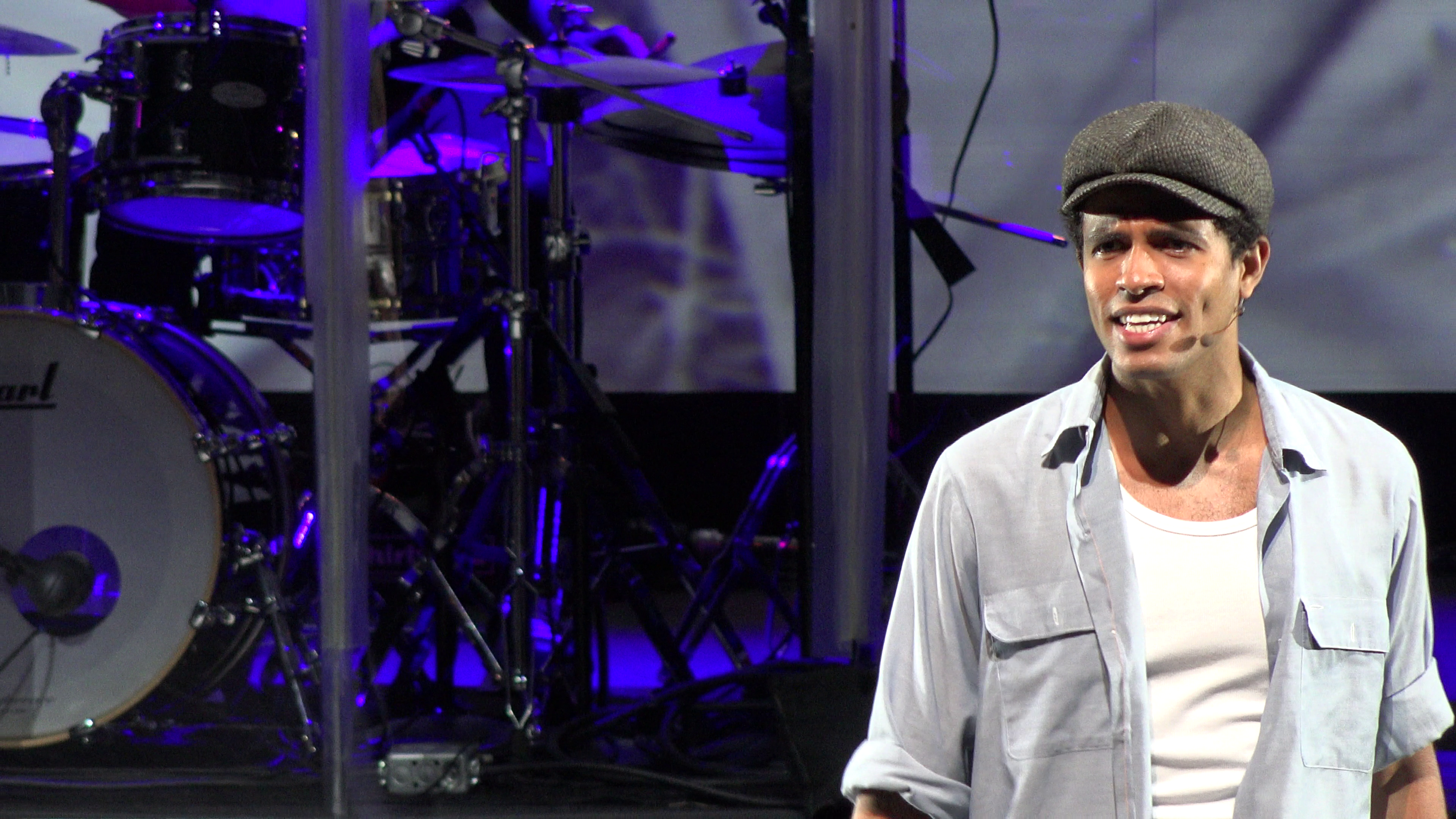
- Van Peebles on stage as father Mario in 2024
- Born: June 4, 1994 (age 32); Los Angeles, California, U.S.
- Occupations: Actor; producer; playwright
- Years active: 1999–present
- Parents: Mario Van Peebles (father); Lisa Vitello (mother)
- Relatives: Melvin Van Peebles (grandfather)

Mandela Van Peebles (born June 4, 1994) is an American actor and producer who has appeared in films such as We the Party, Baadasssss!, and Jigsaw, and the television series Reginald the Vampire.

== Personal life ==
Van Peebles was born in Los Angeles, California. He is one of two children born to director and actor Mario Van Peebles and Lisa Vitello, and a grandson of filmmaker Melvin Van Peebles and Maria (née Marx). He is named after Nelson Mandela.

== Filmography ==
=== Film ===
Year	Title	Role	Notes
1999	Judgment Day	Marley Payne	Debut
2003	Baadasssss!	Angel Muse	
2009	Bring Your "A" Game	Virtual Player	Short documentary film
2012	We the Party	Hendrix	
2012	American Warships	Dunbar, Lookout	Direct-to-video
2016	USS Indianapolis: Men of Courage	Theodore	
2017	Jigsaw	Mitch	
2024	Outlaw Posse	Decker	
TBA	Flint 6	Oscar	Pre-production

=== Television ===
Year	Title	Role	Notes
2009	Mario's Green House	Unknown	Unknown episodes
2016	Roots	Noah	Television mini-series
2018	Karma	Manny Everett	Television film
2021	Wu-Tang: An American Saga	Shank	Episode: "Little Ghetto Boys"
2021	Mayor of Kingstown	Sam, prison guard	Pilot episode
2022	Reginald the Vampire	Maurice Miller	Main role

=== Producer ===
Year	Titled	Notes
2018	Armed	executive producer
