= The Holiday Calendar =

- Film poster
- Directed by: Bradley Walsh
- Written by: Amyn Kaderali
- Produced by: Brad Krevoy
- Starring: Kat Graham; Quincy Brown; Ethan Peck; Ron Cephas Jones
- Cinematography: Peter Benison
- Edited by: Gordon McClellan
- Music by: Sean Nimmons-Paterson
- Production company: MPCA
- Distributed by: Netflix
- Release date: November 2, 2018
- Running time: 95 minutes
- Country: United States
- Language: English

The Holiday Calendar is a 2018 American Christmas romantic comedy film directed by Bradley Walsh from a screenplay by Amyn Kaderali. The film stars Kat Graham, Quincy Brown, Ethan Peck, and Ron Cephas Jones.

It was released on November 2, 2018, by Netflix.

== Plot ==
Abby Sutton, a struggling photographer receives an Advent calendar from her grandfather. Abby isn't impressed at first, but she decides to take it home anyway. The calendar opens up on December 1. Abby begins to connect what is inside each day to what happens in real life, believing that the calendar is magical.

Meanwhile, Abby's friend Josh has been away around the world to focus on his photography but has come back to see Abby.

On December 1, Abby's calendar reveals a pair of boots, and Josh gifts her a pair of boots he bought for her in Italy. On December 2, Abby receives a Christmas tree in her calendar, and she meets a guy named Ty Walker after his tree falls off the roof of his car into her path. On December 3, Abby's calendar reveals a nutcracker, the costume of which Ty's daughter wears in the play put on by Abby's niece's school. The two run into each other again when Abby sprains her wrist and Ty is the doctor who treats her at the clinic. He asks her out, and she agrees to go on a date with him. Abby continues dating Ty, which Josh is struggling with even though he has never expressed his feelings for Abby before. After dating Ty for a couple of weeks, Abby questions his feelings for her and shares her beliefs about the calendar with him. Ty admits he doesn't know Abby very well and criticizes her feelings about the calendar, causing Abby to break up with him.

While working taking pictures of kids meeting Santa, Abby is asked to take some pictures of the local mayor who is participating in a tree-lighting ceremony nearby. Josh inadvertently erases her pictures from the event, and Abby is fired. She and Josh get into an argument and stop seeing each other. Josh leaves to visit his parents in Florida.

Abby's sister puts up a number of her pictures in a school auction, and they are very popular. Her parents finally realize how talented a photographer she is, and the mayor herself won the bid for a photo session. Unfortunately, the Advent calendar was inadvertently sold at the auction as well. The very next day, however, her calendar appears at her front door. Inside, she finds a note from Josh asking her to meet him on Christmas Day.

Josh surprises Abby by telling her he bought the studio so they can do photography together. Abby confesses her feelings for Josh, saying he has always been the guy for her, but she just didn't know it. Josh asks Abby what she got in her calendar that day - which turns out to be a snowflake - and the two share a kiss under the falling snow. Inside the studio, Abby gives Josh his Christmas present - a new camera. Josh tells Abby to say "cheese", but she tearfully tells him she loves him instead. Josh tells her he loves her too and they take a photo together.

A year later, it is the opening of their new studio. Abby and Josh are still a couple and are working as photographers inside the studio. They thank customers for coming to the grand opening, and the movie ends with panning over photos of the couple.

== Cast ==
- Kat Graham as Abby Sutton, a struggling photographer
- Quincy Brown as Josh Barton, Abby's best friend who moves back home after spending some time as a travel photographer
- Ethan Peck as Ty Walker, a doctor, single dad, and Abby's love interest
- Ron Cephas Jones as Gramps Sutton, Abby's grandfather
- Genelle Williams as Sarah Sutton, Abby's sister
- Kevin Hanchard as Rudolph Sutton, Abby and Sarah's father
- Laura de Carteret as Judy Sutton, Abby's and Sarah's mother
- Rodrigo Fernandez-Stoll as Fernando, Josh's friend
- Ali Hassan as Mr. Singh, Abby's boss at the photography studio
- Nicola Correia-Damude as Mayor Patricia Martinez
- Romaine Waite as Mitch
- Harris Shore as Ralphie

== Production ==
In April 2018, it was reported that Bradley Walsh would direct Christmas Calendar for Netflix from a screenplay by Amyn Kaderali. Additionally, Kat Graham, Quincy Brown, and Romaine Waite joined the cast of the film. The film was later re-titled The Holiday Calendar.

Principal photography began in April 2018. The small town depicted in the film is Niagara-on-the-Lake, Ontario, Canada. That town was also the site of a previous year’s Netflix Christmas movie (also by Hideaway Pictures), “Christmas Inheritance.”. Other scenes and overhead shots were filmed in North Bay, Ontario, Canada, the site of many other Hallmark movies.

Toronto hair and makeup artists Allison Mondesir and Alessondra Bastianoni worked as key of the Hair and Makeup departments. Kim Bean worked as the first assistant makeup artist.

== Release ==
It was released on November 2, 2018 by Netflix. A scene from this film was featured on the 2019 Netflix film “The Knight Before Christmas” when the main character turns on the TV and a movie is playing.

== Reception ==
On review aggregator website Rotten Tomatoes, the film holds an approval rating of 33% based on six reviews, with an average rating of 4.8/10.
