= Judgment Day (1999 film) =

- Directed by: John Terlesky
- Written by: Fred Olen Ray (as William Carson)
- Produced by: Lisa M. Hansen; Paul Hertzberg (producers); Ice-T; Mario Van Peebles; Tommy "Tiny" Lister (executive producers)
- Starring: Ice-T; Suzy Amis; Mario Van Peebles; Coolio; Tommy "Tiny" Lister
- Cinematography: Maximo Munzi
- Edited by: Daniel Duncan
- Music by: Joseph Williams
- Production companies: CineTel Films; Judgment Cinema
- Distributed by: CineTel Films
- Release date: August 26, 1999
- Running time: 95 minutes
- Country: United States
- Language: English

Judgment Day is a 1999 direct-to-video science-fiction action film directed by John Terlesky and starring Mario Van Peebles, Suzy Amis and Ice-T. It was Amis' final film before her retirement and is the first CineTel film that deals with a disaster in the sci-fi genre. This marked the second collaboration between Ice-T and Van Peebles after New Jack City (1991).

== Plot ==
Cultists with an enigmatic leader (Van Peebles) seize the only man capable of devising a way to stop a giant meteor from hitting the Earth. A female agent (Amis) teams up with a prisoner (Ice-T), who together have three days to rescue the scientist (Linden Ashby) and save the planet from extinction.

== Cast ==
- Ice-T as Matthew Reese
- Suzy Amis as FBI Agent Jeanine Tyrell
- Mario Van Peebles as Thomas Payne
- Coolio as Luther "Lucifer"
- Linden Ashby as Dr. David Corbett
- Tommy "Tiny" Lister as Brother Clarence
- Max Gail as General Bill Meech
- Mark Deakins as Captain Doug McNally
- James Eckhouse as Colonel Tom Keller
- David Wells as Dr. Dick Secor
- Shireen Crutchfield as Rachael Payne
- Larry Poindexter as Jeff
- Craig Watkinson as Tim
- Dartanyan Edmonds as Damon
- Devika Parikh as Officer Rhonda Reese
- Myles Kilpatrick as Michael Payne
- Mandela Van Peebles as Marley Payne
- Makaylo Van Peebles as Sam Payne
- Maya Van Peebles as Trish Payne
- Jonathan Palmer as Frank Peterson
- Lisa Vitello as Teresa Miller
- Chittra Sukhu as Esperanza
- Toni Small as Lakwanda
- Kevin McDermott as Ed
- Cole S. McKay as Leo
- Chris Conner as Technician
- Richard Yniguez as Old Priest
- Thomas Rosales Jr. as Payne's Man (uncredited)
- John Terlesky as Payne's Shooter (uncredited)
