= Jacob Batalon =

American actor (born 1996)

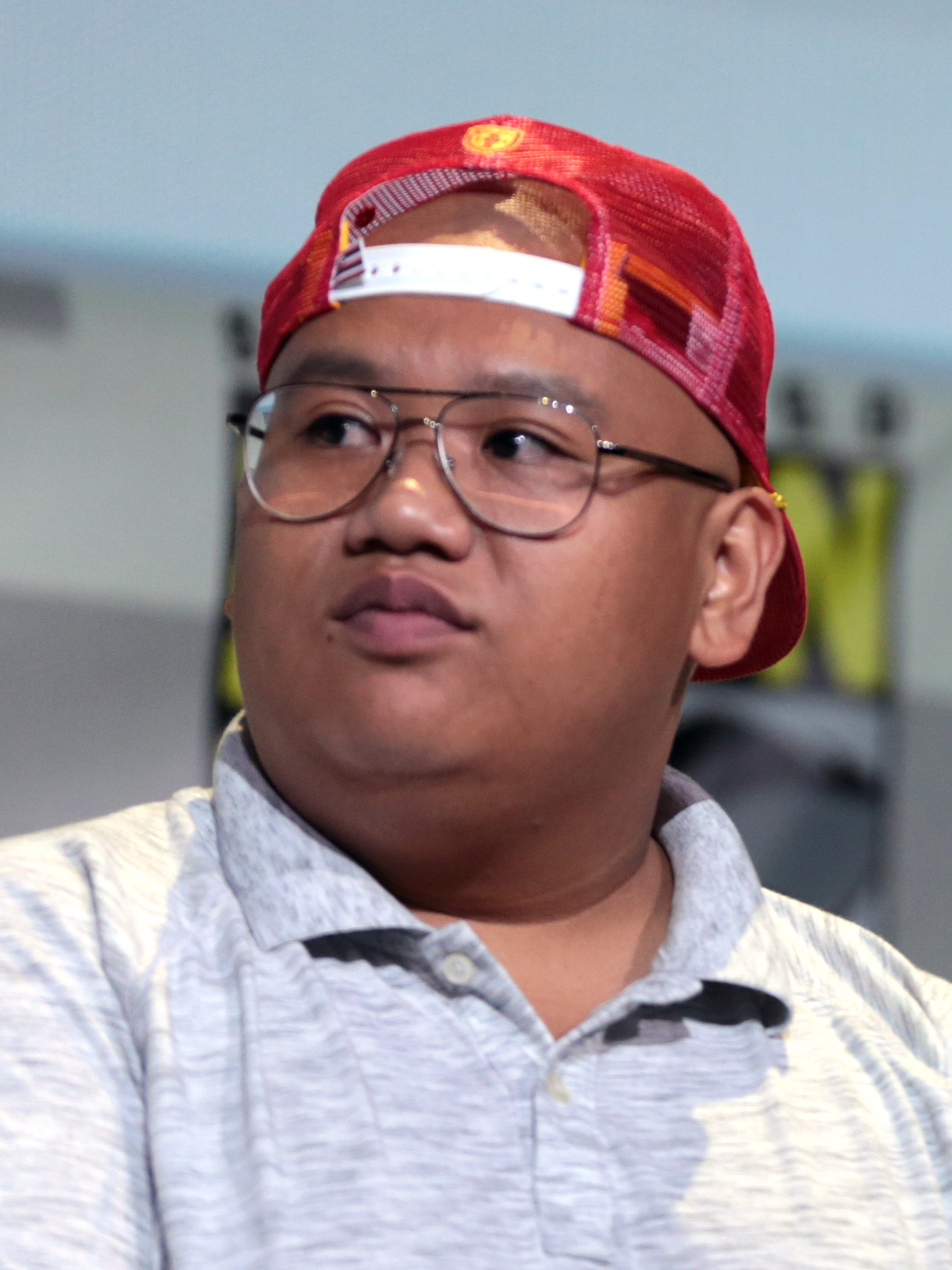
- Batalon at San Diego Comic-Con in 2016
- Born: October 9, 1996 (age 30); Honolulu, Hawaii, U.S.
- Occupation: Actor
- Years active: 2016–present
- Spouse: Veronica Leahov (m. 2026)

Jacob Andres Batalon (born October 9, 1996) is an American actor. Batalon achieved international recognition playing Ned Leeds in the Spider-Man film series (2017–present), part of the Marvel Cinematic Universe (MCU) superhero films. He also played the titular character in the Syfy television series Reginald the Vampire (2022–24) and Roscoe Dixon in the action comedy film Novocaine (2025).

== Early life ==
Jacob Batalon was born on October 9, 1996, in Honolulu, Hawaii, to overseas Filipino parents, Nestor Batalon and Vangie Andres from Pangasinan. Batalon has seven half-siblings: a brother and a sister from his mother, and three brothers and two sisters from his father. His mother regularly accompanied him to auditions. In an episode of Reginald the Vampire, Batalon spoke the Ilocano language to trace his real-life heritage, and used "Andres" as Reginald’s surname to honor his mother, Vangie.

Upon graduating from St. Anthony's School, a private Catholic school, Batalon went to Damien Memorial School. He studied music theory at Kapiʻolani Community College before dropping out. He then enrolled in a two-year acting program at the New York Conservatory for Dramatic Arts.

== Career ==
Batalon made his acting debut in the 2016 film North Woods. His first major role was Ned Leeds, Peter Parker's best friend, in Spider-Man: Homecoming (2017). He has reprised the role in other MCU films: Avengers: Infinity War (2018), Avengers: Endgame and Spider-Man: Far From Home (both 2019), Spider-Man: No Way Home (2021), and Spider-Man: Brand New Day (2026).

In 2018, Batalon played one of the bodies inhabited by spirit A in the young-adult film Every Day. In 2020, he lost 102 pounds (46 kg) for his role in Spider-Man: No Way Home. In 2021, Batalon was cast as the titular Reginald in Syfy's dramedy series Reginald the Vampire. In 2025, Batalon had a role in the film Novocaine: Roscoe Dixon, Nathan "Novocaine" Caine's online gaming friend.

== Personal life ==
In March 2025, Batalon got engaged to architectural designer Veronica Leahov. They married in 2026.

An internet meme based on an image of Batalon at the Spider-Man: Homecoming premiere, dubbing him the "CEO of sex", began spreading in 2019. In a 2025 interview with Screen Rant, Batalon described the meme as "an honor".

Batalon was diagnosed with alopecia in seventh grade.

== Filmography ==
Key
†	Denotes films that have not yet been released

=== Film ===
Jacob Batalon's film credits
Year	Title	Role	Notes	Ref.
2017	North Woods	Cooper		
2017	Spider-Man: Homecoming	Ned Leeds		
2018	Every Day	James / A		
2018	Blood Fest	Krill		
2018	Avengers: Infinity War	Ned Leeds		
2018	Banana Split	Jacob the Manager		
2019	Avengers: Endgame	Ned Leeds		
2019	Spider-Man: Far From Home	Ned Leeds		
2019	Peter's To-Do List	Ned Leeds	Short film	
2019	The True Don Quixote	Sancho Panza		
2019	Let It Snow	Keon		
2021	Spider-Man: No Way Home	Ned Leeds		
2023	Shortcomings	Gene		
2024	Lift	N8		
2024	Tarot	Paxton		
2025	Novocaine	Roscoe Dixon		
2026	The Wrecking Crew	Pika		
2026	Spider-Man: Brand New Day	Ned Leeds		
2026	Avengers Endgame: Encore	Ned Leeds		
2028	Lilo & Stitch 2 †	TBA	Filming	

=== Television ===
Jacob Batalon's television credits
Year	Title	Role	Notes	Ref.
2019	Bubble Gang	Need	Episode: "The Scavengers two-part anniversary special"	
2020	Day by Day	Lucas	Episode: "#Annabelle ClarkeIs Over Party"	
2020	50 States of Fright	Simon	Episode: "Red Rum (Colorado)"	
2022–2024	Reginald the Vampire	Reginald	Main character	

=== Web series ===
Jacob Batalon's web series credits
Year	Title	Role	Notes	Ref.
2019; 2021	The Daily Bugle	Ned Leeds	Far From Home campaign cameo	
