= Mario's Green House =

2009 television series

Mario's Green House was an 8-episode 2009 television series on TV One starring Mario Van Peebles. The series was an environmentally conscious reality television show, in which Van Peebles made his house "greener." The series also starred Melvin Van Peebles, who required his own room for entertaining female guests. Ed Begley, Jr. was involved in the production.
