= Nick Leisure =

American film director

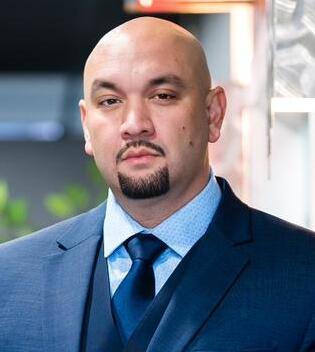
- Leisure in 2024
- Born: Nicholas Lee; Sacramento, California
- Occupations: Film director and producer
- Years active: 2006-present

Nick Leisure (born 1977) is an American filmmaker. He is best known for his feature films A Clear Shot (2019) starring Mario Van Peebles, and Last the Night (2022) starring Brian Austin Green. He is also the CEO and founder of the production company Leisure Films.

== Early life ==
Leisure was born in Sacramento, California. He was raised by his Chinese mother and grandmother, and attended high school in South Sacramento.

== Career ==
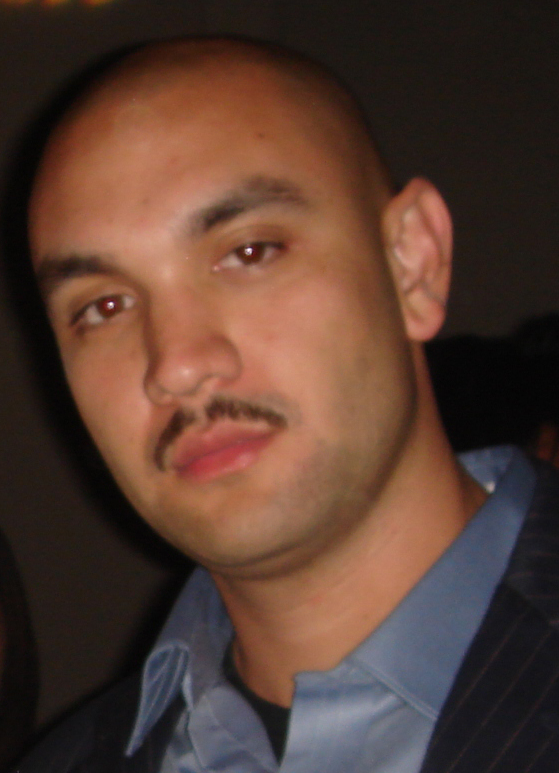
Leisure in 2007

Leisure began his career as a director and cinematographer for commercials and music videos, working with clients such as Toyota, Ray-Ban, the NBA and the NFL. He has also shot promotional content for local professional athletes, including Jason Thompson, Ruthie Bolton, Vernon Davis and Stephen Curry.

Leisure co-directed the 2011 comedy film The Lot, alongside Dawn Dais. In 2013, Leisure directed the short film The Root of All Evil, for which he won an award at the Sacramento International Film Festival. Leisure made his solo feature debut in 2016 with the comedy film Janitors.

Since 2018, Leisure has partnered with Baja Studios in Rosarito, Mexico to shoot his feature films.

In 2019, Leisure directed A Clear Shot, starring Mario van Peebles as a detective negotiating a hostage situation during an electronics store robbery, based on a 1991 true story.

Leisure next directed Last the Night (2022), a pandemic-thriller starring Brian Austin Green as a teacher who seeks revenge against his cruel students.

== Film advocacy and philanthropy ==
Leisure is a founding member of the Hollywood North Film Studio Project, an investor group advocating to build a film studio in Sacramento. In 2024, Leisure called for the resignation of Sacramento's film and media commissioner Jennifer West, citing her failure to attract film productions to the city.

== Filmography ==
=== Films ===
Year	Title	Director	Writer	Producer
2011	The Lot	Yes	No	No
2016	Janitors	Yes	Yes	Yes
2019	A Clear Shot	Yes	Yes	No
2021	Lance Woods: Undeniable	Yes	No	No
2021	One and the Same	No	No	Yes
2022	Last the Night	Yes	Yes	No
2024	Golden	Yes	Yes	Yes
2024	New Year’s Absolution	Yes	No	No

=== Short films ===
Year	Title	Director	Writer	Producer
2013	The Root of All Evil	Yes	Yes	No
2014	11 Minutes	No	No	Yes
2015	A Cry for Vengeance	Yes	No	No
