= We the Party =

- Directed by: Mario Van Peebles
- Written by: Mario Van Peebles
- Produced by: Michael Cohen; Dwjuan F. Fox; Tal Vigderson
- Starring: Mario Van Peebles; Salli Richardson-Whitfield; Michael Jai White; Moises Arias; Tiny Lister; Snoop Dogg; New Boyz; The Rej3ctz; Y.G. Quincy
- Cinematography: Anthony J. Rickert-Epstein
- Edited by: George Artope
- Music by: Tree Adams
- Distributed by: XLrator Media
- Release date: April 6, 2012
- Running time: 105 minutes.
- Country: United States
- Language: English

We the Party is a 2012 comedy film written and directed by Mario Van Peebles and starring Mandela Van Peebles, Simone Battle, Moises Arias, Mario Van Peebles, and Snoop Dogg. Set in an ethnically diverse Los Angeles high school, it focuses on five friends as they deal with "romance, money, prom, college, sex, bullies, Facebook, fitting in, standing out, and finding themselves".

== Cast ==
- Mandela Van Peebles as Hendrix Sutton
- Simone Battle as Cheyenne
- Moises Arias as "Quicktime"
- Makaylo Van Peebles as Obama
- Ryan Vigil as "Que"
- Patrick Cage II as "Chowder"
- Y.G. as C.C.
- Mario Van Peebles as Dr. Sutton
- Salli Richardson-Whitfield as Principal Reynolds
- Michael Jai White as Officer Davis
- Tommy "Tiny" Lister as "No Shame"
- Maya Van Peebles as Michelle
- Quincy as Reggie
- Carlito Olivero as Paco
- Morgana Van Peebles as Megan
- Dominic "Legacy" Thomas as Hill "H-One" Sutton
- Benjamin "Ben J." Earl as "Stunner"
- Snoop Dogg as "Big D"
- Darris Love as "D-Money"
- The Rej3ctz as Themselves

== See also ==
- List of Black films of the 2010s
