= Quincy (actor) =

American actor and singer (born 1991)

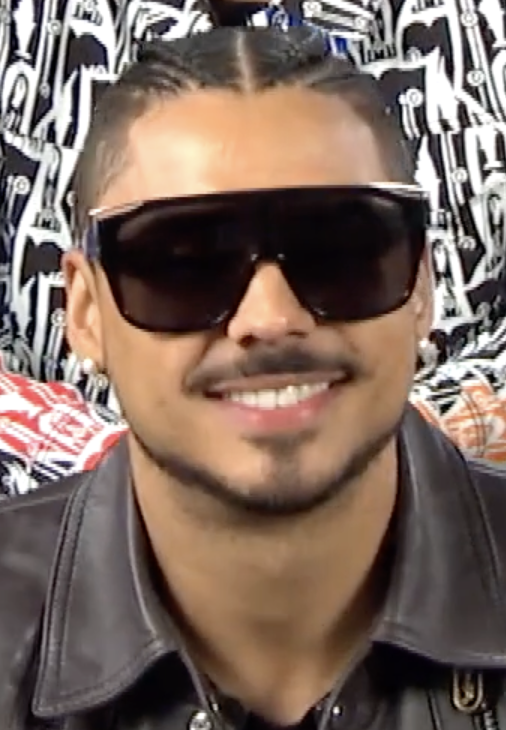
- Quincy in 2020
- Born: Quincy Taylor Brown; June 4, 1991 (age 35); New York City, U.S.
- Occupations: Actor; singer
- Years active: 2008–present
- Parents: Kim Porter (mother); Al B. Sure! (biological father); Sean Combs (stepfather)
- Relatives: King Combs (half-brother); Justin Dior Combs (stepbrother)
- Musical career
- Instrument: Vocals
- Labels: Frequincy; Bad Boy; Epic

Quincy Taylor Brown (born June 4, 1991) is an American actor, dancer, model and singer who performs under the show name Quincy. He released his lead vocal first song in 2012. He had a co-starring role on the television musical drama Star and many other movies. He is the son of former model Kim Porter and singer Al B. Sure!.

== Early life ==
Quincy was born on the 23rd birthday of his father, Al B. Sure!, and was named after Quincy Jones, Al B Sure!'s mentor and Quincy's godfather. Both Quincy and his mother were both the subject of American quartet Jodeci's 1991 hit, "Forever, My Lady", In 1994, when he was three, his mother began a relationship with Sean "Diddy" Combs, who eventually became an informal stepfather to Quincy and raised him as his own. The couple had three more children together. For his 16th birthday, Diddy and Porter threw Quincy a celebrity studded party in Atlanta that was featured on MTV's My Super Sweet 16. His family moved around often but he spent most of his youth in Columbus, Georgia and later moved to Los Angeles, California in his final years of high school and completed his education at Calabasas High School.

== Career ==
Quincy made his acting debut as Reggie in the 2012 film We the Party. In addition to being an actor and musician Quincy has embarked on other ventures including modeling and directing. In August 2012, Quincy walked in the Gaborone Fashion Weekend event in Botswana. In January 2015, Quincy played the role of Jaleel in the film Dope.

In June 2015, Quincy made his directorial debut with the music video for singer and actress Elle Winter's song No Words. In 2016, he was cast in a recurring role as Daylon in the television show The Haves and the Have Nots. In February 2016, Quincy appeared in a campaign for the sneaker brand Creative Recreation. On June 23, 2016, Quincy announced that he had signed a record deal with Bad Boy/Epic Records. Also in 2016, he collaborated with the U.K fashion brand BoohooMan for their Autumn/Winter capsule collection and was the face of the campaign On Valentine's Day in 2017, Quincy released his first E.P entitled "This Is For You". It included songs like Sunshine and I can tell you. In 2018, he starred alongside Kat Graham as Josh in the Netflix original film The Holiday Calendar.

From 2016 to 2019, Quincy was cast in a lead role as Derek Jones on the television series Star. In 2019, Quincy directed and starred in Run Loubi Run, a short film for the fashion house Christian Louboutin's first ever social media campaign. Also in 2019, Quincy was used by the luxe brand MCM Worldwide to launch its Sleep and Loungewear collection. In 2020, he was part of a fashion campaign for the Coach and Bape collaboration and became the first male celebrity spokesperson for Coach New York watches.

Quincy had a recurring role in the 2021, television drama Power Book III: Raising Kanan. He formerly played a character called Crown Camacho. In July 2021, Quincy was featured in the campaign for Ivy Park and Adidas's "Flex Park" collection. Also in 2021, he was in the campaign for Montblanc and Maison Kitsuné's capsule collection and was used by Lacoste for the brands promotion of its L001 sneaker launch. Quincy has appeared in magazines and has been featured in several online publications such as Vogue.com and Forbes.com.

=== Business ventures ===
He is the founder of the production company FourXample. He also has a watch line called Chalk by Quincy, a jeans collection with Embellish and a start-up technology company. In 2019, Quincy developed and launched a picture editing app called Fresh Crop.

== Filmography ==
=== Film ===
Year	Title	Role	Notes
2012	We the Party	Reggie	
2015	Brotherly Love	Chris Collins	
2015	Dope	Jaleel	
2015	Street	Dante	
2018	The Holiday Calendar	Josh	

=== Television ===
Year	Title	Role	Notes
2008	My Super Sweet 16	Himself	2 episodes
2015	CSI: Crime Scene Investigation	Trey Peach	Episode: "Hero to Zero"
2015	Keeping Up With The Kardashians	Himself	Episode: "Rites Of Passage"
2016	The Haves and the Have Nots	Daylon	Recurring role; 3 episodes
2016–2019	Star	Derek Jones	Main Cast
2017	The Wendy Williams Show	Himself	One episode
2018	Wild 'N Out	Himself	Episode: "The Comb Brothers"
2019	The Real	Himself	One episode
2020	The Eric Andre Show	Himself	Episode: "Is Your Wife Still Depressed ?"
2021–22	Power Book III: Raising Kanan	Crown Camacho	Recurring role
2025	The Family Business: New Orleans	Prince	Series regular

=== Music video appearances ===
Year	Title	Artist	Role
2010	"All Black Everything"	Soulja Boy	Cameo
2013	"My Baby"	Zendaya	Cameo
2015	"Walk Away"	Jasmine V	Love interest
2021	"Sobrio"	Maluma	Cameo

== Discography ==
=== Extended plays ===
Year	EP details
2017	This Is for You: Released: February 14, 2017; Label: Human Re-sources/Frequincy; Format: Digital download

=== Singles ===
List of singles as lead artist
Title	Year	Album
"Stay Awhile" (feat. Kendré)	2012	—N/a
"The First Thing"	2013	—N/a
"Friends First" (feat. French Montana)	2014	—N/a
"Exotic" (feat. G-Eazy)	2015	—N/a
"Record Straight"	2015	—N/a
"Blue Dot"	2016	—N/a
"Late Night Flex"	2016	This Is for You
"I can tell you" (feat. Al B Sure!) (Nite and Day cover)	2017	This Is for You
"Snuggle Up"	2018	—N/a
"Aye Yo"	2020	—N/a
"Aye Yo remix" (feat.Shaggy and Patoranking)	2020	—N/a

=== Guest appearances ===
List of guest appearances on singles
Title	Year	Artist	Album
"Juice"	2015	Mike Darole	A.W.A.P. (All Work All Play)
"Incredible"	2013	Xia Junsu	Incredible
"Hennessy"	2020	Devin Kirtz	N/A
