= The Rej3ctz =

American hip-hop and electronic music group

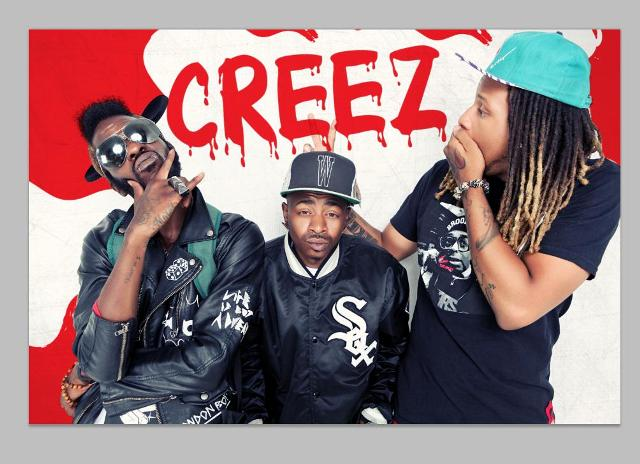
- The Rej3ctz: MoWii, Pee W33, and Bounc3

Background information
- Origin: Los Angeles, California, United States
- Genres: West Coast hip-hop, electronic
- Years active: 2010–present
- Label: Renaissance Music LLC
- Members: Mowii; Pee Wee; Bounce
- Website: rej3ctz.com

The Rej3ctz are an American hip-hop and electronic music group from Los Angeles, and are best known for their 2011 single "Cat Daddy", which entered the Billboard Hot 100, and its eponymous dance, which became a viral phenomenon.

== History ==
The group hit the music scene in 2009 with their underground hit "Rej3ct Stomp", and later with a dance called "Rej3ct". Their second record, "I'm Fitted", sampled Kris Kross song "Jump", which reached No.1 on the Billboard Hot 100 in 1992. The viral video for the song, which the group stated "showcased their eccentric style, comedy and individual characters", have reached over 200,000 hits on YouTube. The group made their television debut on BET's 106 & Park 10th Anniversary Special alongside Chris Brown. They have also appeared on The Mo'Nique Show.

The group rose to prominence in late 2010 when they released the single "Cat Daddy". The music video for the song, which promoted the dance of the same name, featured American artist Chris Brown. The song became a viral phenomenon, with the video reaching over 70 million views on YouTube, and the single charting at No.97 on the Billboard Hot 100. It also appeared at No.77 on the Hot R&B/Hip-Hop Songs chart. According to Thomas Clayton of The Daily Rind, the song had 14,000 downloads on iTunes in its first week and the video had 9 million pageviews at the time.

Kate Upton, who in February 2012 was the cover model for the Sports Illustrated Swimsuit Issue, recorded a video of the Dougie that went viral and garnered over 5 million hits in April 2011. She announced her intention to release a video performance of the Cat Daddy when she served as grand marshal for the 2012 Daytona 500. The video of Upton dancing on a break between photo shots was posted online on April 30. After garnering close to 1 million hits in the first 24 hours, YouTube banned her version of the dance from their site for being too risqué, but it was restored later with an age restriction.

November 11, 2012 they released the CR33ZTAPE, which featured original music and collaborations with DJ Carnage, DJ Mustard, T-Pain, T Dolla Sign; it also includes single "Peta Griffin".

The Rej3ctz released a video for "Solid", a track off CR33ZTAPE, which "displays a variety of imagery focusing on politics, like highlights from the campaign speeches from then-President Barack Obama and then-First Lady Michelle Obama. They campaigned throughout college campuses to raise awareness and register voters. Bounc3, via MTV news, urged fans to turn up to vote.

In 2012 they were a part of the cast that included Snoop Dogg, YG, The New Boyz, and more for the film, We the Party. The Rej3ctz were also featured in the film School Dance written by Nick Cannon and Nile Evans in 2014.

They collaborated with Dillon Francis for track "All That" with Twista which was also used to help promote the movie Scouts Guide to the Zombie Apocalypse which was released on October 30, 2015. The song was also used as the recap for America's Best Dance Crew season 8 finale.

In 2012 they began experiencing issues with their label head, Seven Aurelius, eventually ending in a lawsuit.

The Rej3ctz are expected to release their mixtape Homeless Billionaires early 2016.

According to TMZ, The Rej3ctz' member Jovan "Pee W33" Clayton was arrested in October 2018 for an outstanding domestic battery charge.

== Discography ==
=== Mixtapes ===
- TheFUNKtion vs theKICKback (2011)
- CREEZTAPE (2012)

=== Singles ===
Single	Year	Peak chart positions			Album
Single	Year	US	US R&B	US Heat	Album
"Rej3ct Stomp"	2008	–	–	–	Mixtapes
"I'm Fitted"	2009	–	–	–	Mixtapes
"Cat Daddy"	2011	97	77	12	TheFUNKtion vs theKICKback
"C.R.E.E.Z. - SWAG IS DEAD"	2012	–	–	–	CREEZTAPE
"PETA GRIFIN"	2013	–	–	–	Peta Grifin -Single
"All That (featuring The Rej3ctz & Twista)"	2014	–	–	–	Dillon Francis - Money Sucks, Friends Rule
"Spring Break (featuring The Rej3ctz)"	2015	–	–	–	TWRK - We Are TWRK
"On fleek (featuring Too Short & The Rej3ctz)"	2015	–	–	–	Mimosa - single
"Fuck Out My Way (featuring Stacy)"	2015	–	–	–	The Rej3ctz - single
"Koolaid (featuring David Sabastian)"	2016	–	–	–	The Rej3ctz - Single
"Ghetto Love (featuring TeeFlii)"	2016	–	–	–	The Rej3ctz - Single
"–" denotes items which were not released in that country or failed to chart.
