= Mario Van Peebles =

American actor and director (born 1957)

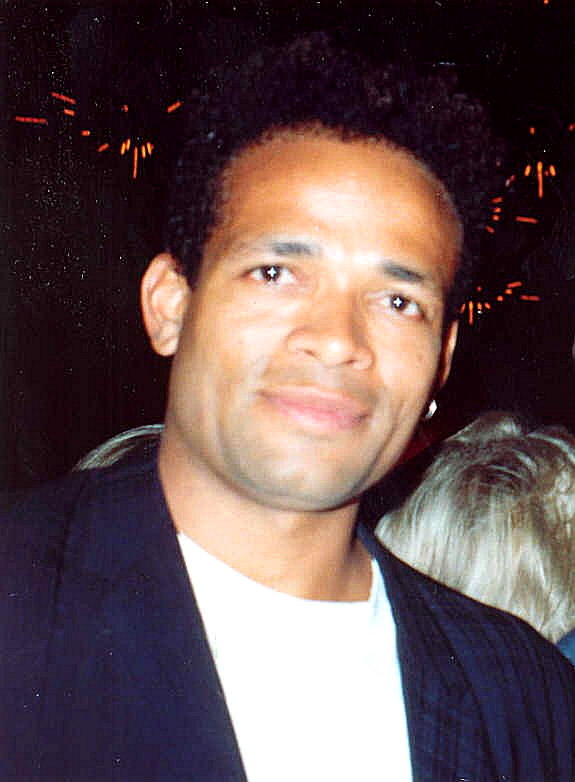
- Van Peebles in 1991
- Born: Mario Cain Van Peebles; January 15, 1957 (age 69); Mexico City, Mexico
- Education: Columbia University (BA)
- Occupations: Actor; director
- Years active: 1968–present
- Spouse(s): Lisa Vitello (2 children); Chitra Sukhu Van Peebles (3 children)
- Children: 5, including Mandela Van Peebles
- Father: Melvin Van Peebles

Mario Cain Van Peebles (born January 15, 1957) is a Mexican-born American actor and director. He is the son of Melvin Van Peebles, whom he played in the 2003 biopic Baadasssss!, which he also co-wrote, produced, and directed. He also starred in Heartbreak Ridge (1986), New Jack City (1991), and USS Indianapolis: Men of Courage (2016), the latter two of which he also directed.

== Early life and education ==
Mario Van Peebles was born on January 15, 1957, in Mexico City, Mexico, to Melvin Van Peebles and Maria Marx. After graduating from St. Thomas More School in 1974, he received his BA at Columbia University and was also invited to speak as the Class Day Speaker as part of the annual commencement exercises in 2021.

== Career ==
=== 1968–1971: First roles ===
Van Peebles' first screen appearance was in 1968, in the soap opera One Life to Live.

In 1971, he appeared in the film Sweet Sweetback's Baadasssss Song. Melvin directed and played the lead role, and Mario played his father's character as a child. The film became a hit and a historical American film, because it was widely credited with showing Hollywood that a viable black audience existed and thus influenced the creation of the Blaxploitation genre. That year, Mario also acted in a television film called Crosscurrent.

For the rest of the decade, he did not appear in other productions.

=== 1981–1985: Subsequent roles and first lead ===
In 1981, Van Peebles acted in the miniseries The Sophisticated Gents.

He appeared in the action film Exterminator 2 (1984), as the main villain against its protagonist, played by Robert Ginty. When the production wrapped, the producers were unhappy and wanted a re-shoot. They replaced the original director, but the main star was no longer available so they made Van Peebles' character more central.

That same year, Van Peebles appeared as a dancer in Francis Ford Coppola's movie The Cotton Club.

In 1985, he landed his first leading role in the film Rappin' as Rappin' John Hood, an ex-convict who attempts to save his neighborhood from developers and hoodlums.

=== 1985–1991: Continued acting career and early directorial effort to breakthrough ===
In 1985, he played in the comedy Delivery Boys, was one of the central characters in the action drama South Bronx Heroes, and acted in the dramatic TV film Children of the Night and one episode of The Cosby Show.

In 1986, he acted in the urban action film 3:15, the comedy Last Resort, the TV film D.C. Cops, four episodes of L.A. Law, and the Clint Eastwood military film Heartbreak Ridge based on the United States Marine Corps.

In 1987, he played in the sport film Hotshot, the TV film The Facts of Life Down Under, and Jaws: The Revenge, the fourth and final installment of the Jaws franchise.

In 1988, Van Peebles played the lead in the short-lived detective show Sonny Spoon. The show ran for two brief seasons, both of which aired in 1988 before the series was canceled. The show would mark his directorial debut, for which he tackled the task for one episode. That same year, he also acted in the TV film The Child Saver.

In 1989, he directed for the show Top of the Hill, three episodes of 21 Jump Street, two of which he acted in, and an episode of the TV series Wiseguy. He also acted in one episode of American Playwrights Theater: The One-Acts, and the film Identity Crisis directed by his father.

At the beginning of the 1990s he performed in the TV film Blue Bayou and one episode of In Living Color.

Van Peebles directed Malcolm Takes a Shot, a 1991 CBS Schoolbreak Special about an aspiring high-school basketball star whose obstacles include epilepsy and his own arrogance. Van Peebles appeared in the special in a cameo appearance as the main character's doctor. He was nominated for a DGA Award by the Directors Guild of America for "Outstanding Directorial Achievement in Dramatic Shows".

He made his feature film directorial debut in 1991 with the black gangster film New Jack City, in which he also co-stars. Other lead actors are Wesley Snipes, Ice-T and Judd Nelson. New Jack City was produced with an estimated $8,000,000 budget. The film premiered at the Sundance Film Festival on January 17, 1991, before being released nationally on March 8, 1991. Well received by critics, it grossed $7,039,622 during its opening weekend, and was the highest grossing independent film of 1991, grossing a total of $47,624,253 domestically.

That same year, he directed one episode of Gabriel's Fire and acted in the TV film A Triumph of the Heart: The Ricky Bell Story.

=== 1992–2009: Subsequent success ===
In 1992, he acted in two TV films: In the Line of Duty: Street War and Stompin' at the Savoy.

In 1993, he starred in and directed the black Western Posse, featuring a large ensemble cast including Woody Strode, Billy Zane, Tommy Lister, Jr., Tone Loc, Big Daddy Kane, Robert Hooks, and many more. The film tells the story of a posse of black soldiers and one ostracized white soldier, who are all betrayed by a corrupt colonel. That same year, he played in the science fiction crime film Full Eclipse with Patsy Kensit and Bruce Payne.

In 1994, he collaborated twice with actor Christopher Lambert; they played the side by side leads in the action film Gunmen, and he was the main villain in Highlander III: The Sorcerer, the third installment of the Highlander film series. He also acted in a film called In the Living Years.

In 1995, he directed and co-starred in Panther based on a screenplay adapted by his father, Melvin, from his novel of the same name portraying the Black Panther Party, tracing the organization from its founding through its decline in a compressed timeframe. Creative license is taken but the general trajectory of the Party and its experiences is factual. At the Locarno International Film Festival it won the prize of the Ecumenical Jury, a Silver Leopard, and was nominated for a Golden Leopard. At the Political Film Society it was nominated for a PFS Award.

In 1996, he acted in one episode of Living Single and one episode of HBO's Strangers. He also played the lead in the science fiction action film Solo. His directorial release that year was Gang in Blue, in which he stars and co-directs with his father who also has a role in the film. It's about a black police officer who discovers a cell of white supremacist vigilantes within his department.

In 1997, he acted in one episode of The X-Files, and in the films Stag, Riot, and Los Locos, the first American film directed by Jean-Marc Vallée.

In 1998, he directed and starred in Love Kills, a comedy about a masseur who gets mixed up in the family plots at the mansion of a recently deceased Beverly Hills millionaire. He also appeared in the mini series Mama Flora's Family, Valentine's Day, and Killers in the House.

In 1999, he acted in Judgement Day, and Raw Nerve.

In 2000, Van Peebles acted in one episode of Martial Law and 20 episodes of Rude Awakening. He also appeared in the film Sally Hemings: An American Scandal and Blowback.

In 2001, he starred in a film called Guardian and co-starred in the Michael Mann film Ali, for which he received a nomination for "Outstanding Supporting Actor" at the NAACP Image Awards.

In 2002, he acted in 10,000 Black Men Named George, two episodes of Robbery Homicide Division, and the TV movie Fiona.

In 2003, he acted in the film The Hebrew Hammer, 44 Minutes: The North Hollywood Shoot-Out, Gang of Roses, and The Street Lawyer.

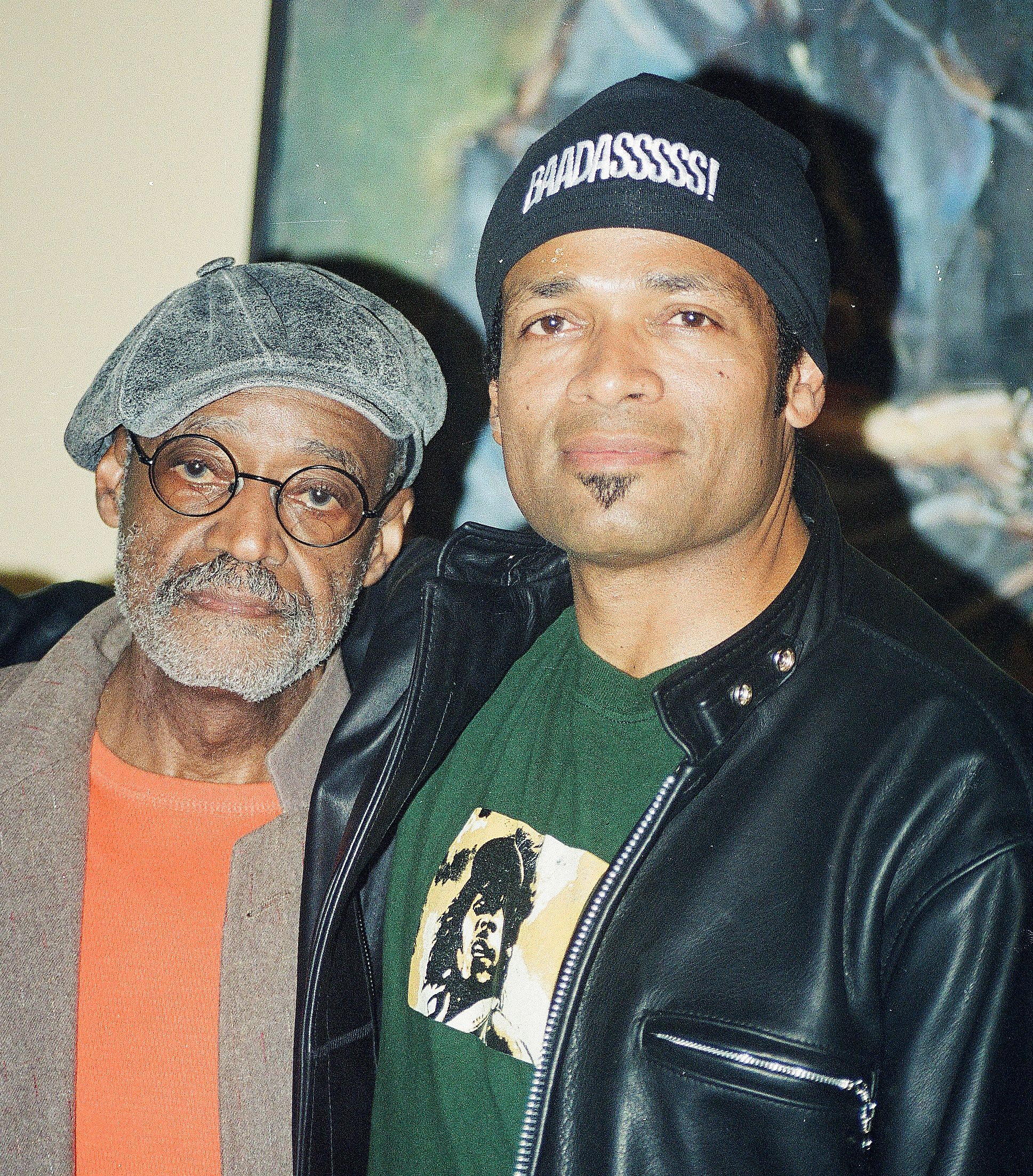
Mario Van Peebles and his father

His 2003 docudrama Baadasssss!, also known as How to Get the Man's Foot Outta Your Ass, opened at the Toronto International Film Festival. The film describes the making of his father's seminal film, Sweet Sweetback's Baadasssss Song. Mario directed the film as well as portraying his father in the lead role. The film was critically acclaimed and garnered numerous awards and nominations in the film festival circuits: it won "Best Feature Film" 2004 Philadelphia Film Festival and was nominated for Best Feature 2004 Gijón International Film Festival. At the 2005 Black Reel Awards, he was nominated for Best Actor, won Best Director, won Best Screenplay, and was nominated for Best Film, and the actress Joy Bryant was nominated Best Supporting Actress. Additionally, Van Peebles received three nominations at 2005 Independent Spirit Awards, and two nominations at 2005 NAACP Image Awards.

In 2004, he was a lead in the TV film Crown Heights and acted in one episode of Soul Food. In 2005, he acted in Carlito's Way: Rise to Power. In 2006, he directed and co-starred in the film Hard Luck, starring Snipes as the lead and Cybill Shepherd in a supporting role. Snipes plays Lucky, a down on his luck former criminal and drug dealer whose post prison trials and tribulations take him on a wild adventure. In 2007, he acted in an episode of Law & Order and the film Sharpshooter. That year, he returned to directing for television starting with three episodes of Damages, in which he also had recurring role until 2009.

In 2008, he acted in his father's film Confessionsofa Ex-Doofus-ItchyFooted Mutha and 43 episodes of the soap opera All My Children. He returned to Law & Order as a director for three episodes. In 2009, Van Peebles and his family starred in the reality TV show Mario's Green House. He also acted in the film A Letter to Dad.

=== 2010–present ===
In 2010, he acted in two films Multiple Sarcasms and Across the Line: The Exodus of Charlie Wright. He directed one episode of Lost, the documentary Fair Game?, and the film Redemption Road.

In 2011, he directed the sport drama All Things Fall Apart starring rapper/actor 50 Cent in the title role playing a football player who suffers from a deadly disease; Van Peebles also played a role in this feature. Other acting credits that year were the films Tied to a Chair and 5th & Alameda, on TV, two episodes of Hellcats and two episodes of The Game, and he started to direct for the TV series Boss directing five episodes until 2012.

In 2012, he wrote, directed, and acted in We the Party, a comedy set in an ethnically diverse Los Angeles high school. The film focuses on five friends as they deal with romance, money, prom, college, sex, bullies, Facebook, fitting in, standing out, and finding themselves. Also that year, he acted in one episode of The Finder and the feature film American Warships.

In 2013, he directed one episode NCIS, one episode of Monday Mornings, one episode of Zero Hour, and an episode of Nashville and in 2014 he directed two additional episodes of Nashville as well as acting in one, in 2015, he reprised his role with another director.

In 2014, Van Peebles wrote, directed, and acted in Red Sky, an action/thriller film starring Cam Gigandet, Shane West, and Rachael Leigh Cook. He also directed three episodes of Once Upon a Time, and that year, he acted in two other films Mantervention and Drumline: A New Beat.

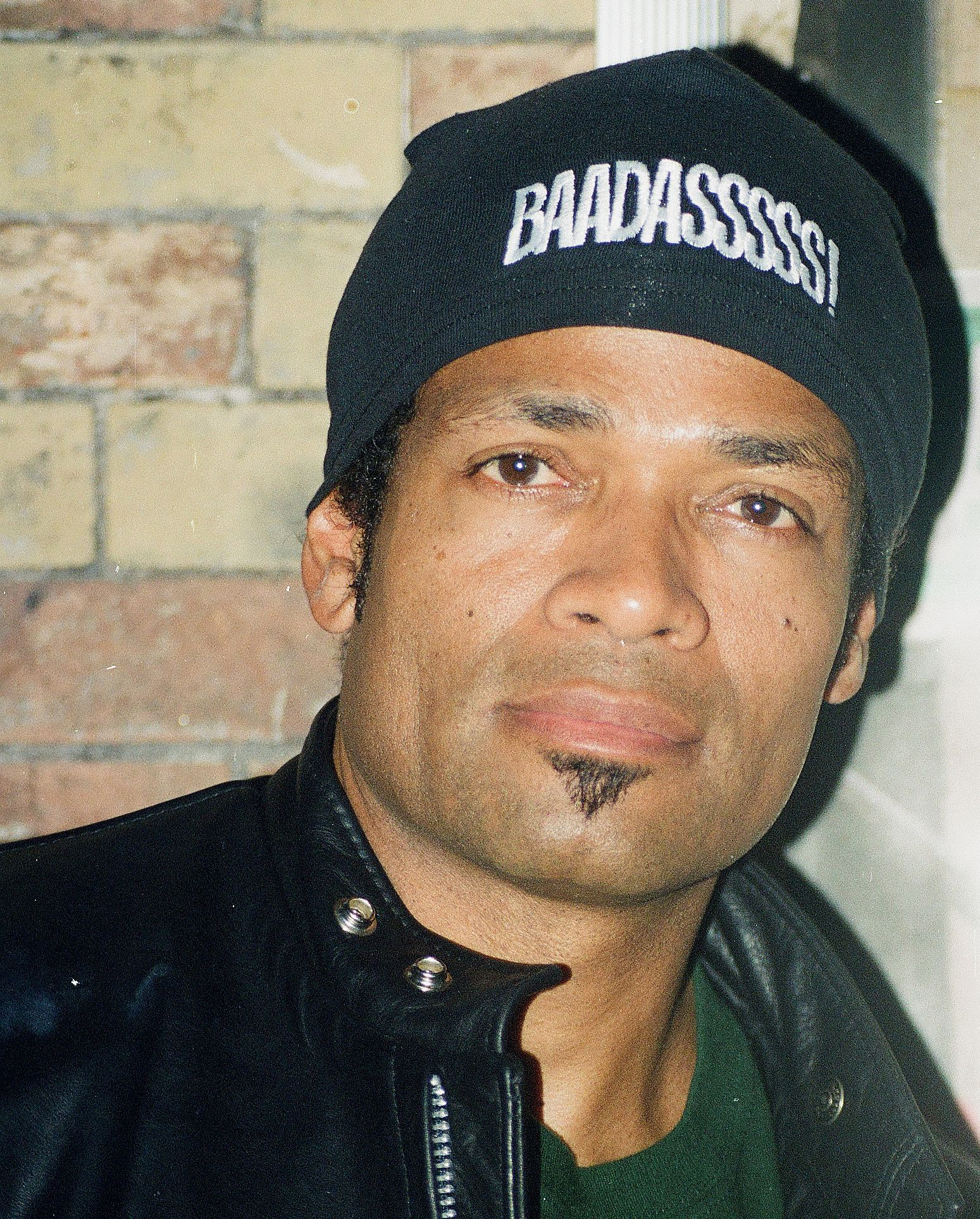
Van Peebles in 2018

In 2015, he directed one episode of The Last Ship, one episode of Chicago P.D., and two episodes of Empire.

In 2016, he directed another episode of Empire and two episodes of Being Mary Jane. Also in the same year, he directed the film USS Indianapolis: Men of Courage, based largely on the true story of the loss of the ship in the closing stages of the Second World War, starring Nicolas Cage, Tom Sizemore, and Thomas Jane.

He directed one episode of Roots and acted in the feature film Submerged.

In 2017, he directed two additional episodes of Being Mary Jane and one episode of Hand of God. He also acted in the feature For Justice and in four episodes of Bloodline, one of which he also directed, and he directed an additional episode his character didn't appear in. That year, he created and produced the TV series Superstition, directed eight episodes, and acted in ten, and in some of them he performed both roles.

In 2026, he was given the Icon of Achievement Award as part of the Lexus Uptown Honors Hollywood Awards.

== Activism ==
In 2014, Van Peebles filmed a public service video supporting the District of Columbia statehood movement. His advocacy is part of DC Shadow Senator Paul Strauss’ “51 Stars" campaign which aims to enlist 51 celebrities to endorse making Washington, D.C. the 51st state.

== Filmography ==
=== Film ===
Year	Film	Role	Notes
1971	Sweet Sweetback's Baadasssss Song	Young Sweetback / Kid	
1971	Crosscurrent	Raphael	TV movie
1984	Exterminator 2	X	
1984	The Cotton Club	Dancer	
1985	Delivery Boys	Spider	
1985	Rappin'	John Hood	
1985	Children of the Night	Roy Spanish	TV movie
1985	South Bronx Heroes	Tony	
1986	3:15	Whisperer	
1986	Last Resort	Pino	
1986	D.C. Cops	Cliff Dickerson	TV movie
1986	Hotshot	Winston	
1986	Heartbreak Ridge	Corporal Stitch Jones	
1987	The Facts of Life Down Under	David Johnson	TV movie
1987	Jaws: The Revenge	Jake McCay	
1988	The Child Saver		TV movie
1989	Identity Crisis	Chilly D	
1990	Blue Bayou	Jay Filley	TV movie
1991	New Jack City	Stone	
1991	A Triumph of the Heart: The Ricky Bell Story	Ricky Bell	TV movie
1992	Stomping at the Savoy	Walter	TV movie
1992	In the Line of Duty: Street War	Raymond Williamson	TV movie
1993	Posse	Jesse Lee	
1993	Full Eclipse	Max Dire	TV movie
1994	Gunmen	Cole Parker	
1994	Highlander III: The Sorcerer	Kane	
1994	In the Living Years	Norman	
1995	Panther	Stokely Carmichael	
1996	Solo	Solo	
1996	Gang in Blue	Michael Rhodes	TV movie
1997	Riot	Turner	TV movie
1997	Stag	Michael Barnes	
1997	Crazy Six	Dirty Mao	Video
1997	Los Locos	Chance	
1998	Valentine's Day	Jack	Video
1998	Love Kills	Poe Finklestein	
1998	Killers in the House	Rodney Sawyer	TV movie
1999	Judgment Day	Thomas Payne	Video
1999	Raw Nerve	Detective Blair Valdez	
2000	Blowback	Insp. Don Morrell	
2001	Guardian	Detective Kross	
2001	Ali	Malcolm X	
2002	10,000 Black Men Named George	Ashley Totten	TV movie
2002	Fiona	Detective Winston Cates	TV movie
2003	The Hebrew Hammer	Mohammed Ali Paula Abdul Rahim	
2003	44 Minutes: The North Hollywood Shoot-Out	Henry Jones	TV movie
2003	Baadasssss!	Melvin Van Peebles	
2003	Gang of Roses	Jessie Lee	
2003	The Street Lawyer	Mordecai Green	TV movie
2004	Crown Heights	Paul Richards	TV movie
2005	Carlito's Way: Rise to Power	Earl	Video
2006	Hard Luck	Captain Davis	
2007	Sharpshooter	Flick	TV movie
2008	Confessionsofa Ex-Doofus-ItchyFooted Mutha	Pirate Captain	
2010	Multiple Sarcasms	Rocky	
2010	Across the Line: The Exodus of Charlie Wright	Agent Hobbs	Video
2011	All Things Fall Apart	Eric	
2011	5th & Alameda	Trevor	
2011	Tied to a Chair	Billy Rust	
2012	We the Party	Sutton	
2012	American Warships	Captain James Winston	Video
2014	Red Sky	Jason Cutter	
2014	Mantervention	Steve	
2014	Drumline: A New Beat	Mr. Bolton	TV movie
2015	For Justice	Ben Tolan	TV movie
2016	Submerged	Hector	
2018	Run the Race	Pastor Bennet Baker	
2018	Armed	Chief	
2019	A Clear Shot	Gomez	
2019	Immortal	Carl	
2020	Seized	Mzamo	
2021	Salt-N-Pepa	Pastor	TV movie
2024	Outlaw Posse	Chief	

=== Television ===
Year	Show	Role	Notes
1981	The Sophisticated Gents	Nicholas Dobson	Main Cast
1982–1983	One Life to Live	Doc Gilmore	Regular Cast
1985	The Cosby Show	Garvin	Episode: "Clair's Sister"
1986	L.A. Law	Andrew Taylor	Recurring Cast: Season 1
1988	Sonny Spoon	Sonny Spoon	Main Cast
1989	21 Jump Street	Dancer/Dana	Guest Cast: Season 3–4
1989	American Playwrights Theater: The One-Acts	Shooter	Episode: "Third and Oak: The Pool Hall"
1990	CBS Schoolbreak Special	Dr. Thompson	Episode: "Malcolm Takes a Shot"
1993	In Living Color	-	Episode: "Calhoun Tubbs"
1996	Living Single	Cole Front	Episode: "Likes Father, Likes Son"
1996	Strangers	Mac	Episodes: "Leave"
1997	The Outer Limits	Captain William Clark	Episode: "Bodies of Evidence"
1998	Mama Flora's Family	Luke	Episode: "Part I & II"
2000	Martial Law	Jake Cord	Episode: "Deathfist Five: MCU"
2000	The President's Mistress: Sally Hemings	James Hemings	Episode: "Part I & II"
2000–2001	Rude Awakening	Marcus Adams	Main Cast: Season 3
2002	Robbery Homicide Division	Alton Davis	Recurring Cast
2004	Soul Food	Quentin James	Episode: "Don't Think This Hasn't Been Fabulous"
2007	Law & Order	Attorney Carsley	Episode: "Murder Book"
2007–2009	Damages	Agent Randall Harrison	Recurring Cast: Seasons 1-2
2008	All My Children	Samuel Woods	Regular Cast
2009	Mario's Green House	Himself	Main Cast
2011	The Game	Bo	Recurring Cast: Season 4
2011	Hellcats	Michael Verdura	Recurring Cast
2012	The Finder	Fontana	Episode: "Bullets"
2014–2015	Nashville	Henry Benton	Recurring Cast: Season 3
2017	Bloodline	Prosecutor	Recurring Cast: Season 3
2017–2018	Superstition	Isaac Hastings	Main Cast
2018	Deception	Bruce Conners	Episode: "The Unseen Hand"
2018	Blindspot	Frank Davenport	Episode: "Ca-ca-Candidate for Cri-cri-Crime"
2018	Z Nation	Cooper	Recurring Cast: Season 5
2019	The Village	Andre	Episode: "Choosing to Hope"
2019	Empire	Uncle Ray	Episode: "Got on My Knees to Pray"
2019–2020	Sherman's Showcase	Himself	Guest Cast: Season 1–2
2021–2022	A Million Little Things	Ronald	Recurring Cast: Season 4

=== Stage ===
- Waltz of the Stork (1982)
