= Iris Barry =

American art historian and film preservationist

- Born: Iris Sylvia Crump; 1895; Washwood Heath
- Died: December 22, 1969; Marseille, France
- Occupation: film critic
- Known for: curator at the Museum of Modern Art

Iris Barry (1895 – 22 December 1969) was a British-American film critic and curator. In the 1920s she helped establish the original London Film Society, and was the first curator of the film department of the Museum of Modern Art, New York City in 1935.

== Life ==
Barry was born Iris Sylvia Crump, in the Washwood Heath district of Birmingham, England. She was the daughter of Alfred Charles Crump and Annie Crump. She studied at the Ursuline convent, Verviers, Belgium.

She moved to London in 1916 or 1917, where she met Ezra Pound and attended “Ezuversity,” that is, Ezra Pound’s programme through which he educated young male and female poets on the art of reading and writing. In the letters Pound wrote to her, among many other things, he encouraged her to emancipate herself, to avoid marriage and to do something no other living person had done before. She had two children with Wyndham Lewis, a boy in 1919, and daughter in 1920. According to scholar Yolanda Morato, the avant-garde had a very strong impact on her during this period; the essence of her first book on the cinema as art is to be found in these years. As Barry spent the war years going to the cinema, when she wrote her book Let's go to the pictures (1926), she explicitly stated: "Going to the pictures is nothing to be ashamed of" (p. viii).

In 1923 she met the American poet Alan Porter (1899–1942), assistant literary editor of The Spectator, and published a poem in the magazine in July 1923. During their engagement The Spectator also favorably reviewed her first novel, Splashing into Society. She and Porter were married on October 8, 1923, the name Felix Porter appearing in the marriage record.

She began publishing film criticism in The Spectator in 1923, and was film correspondent for the Daily Mail between 1925 and 1930, when she was fired for writing a negative review of a film by Elinor Glyn, a friend of the proprietor. In those five years she wrote hundreds if not thousands of articles for the paper. Subsequently she emigrated to the United States; her marriage to Alan Porter did not long survive the move.

The Film Society, the first of its kind, was launched in October 1925; she was one of its founders along with cinema owner Sidney Bernstein, film director Adrian Brunel, well-connected enthusiast Ivor Montagu, and fellow film critic Walter Mycroft.

She is best remembered as a curator at the Museum of Modern Art, which had opened in 1929. After immigrating to the United States in 1930, she founded the film study department in 1932, with an archival collection of rare films, library of film-related books, and a film circulation program. She also collected films. She became an American citizen in 1941, and married John E. Abbott.

Barry wrote a book on moviegoing Let's Go to the Pictures (1926) and the scholarly classic D. W. Griffith: American Film Master (1940), and became a regular book reviewer for the New York Herald Tribune.

In 1949, she was made a Chevalier of the Legion of Honor by the French government, in recognition of her services to French cinema.

She died 22 December 1969, in Marseille.

== MoMA's Film Library ==
The cinema studies scholar Haidee Wasson argues that under Barry's direction the MoMA's Film Library, the first American institution of film art, created the cultural and intellectual climate that allowed "selected films to become visible to an emergent public under the rubrics of art and history," served as a "promulgator of discourses about cultural value and productive leisure," and consequently defined "what objects and media matter within the politics of cultural value and visual knowledge". Wasson further details MoMA's director's Alfred Barr and Iris Barry's continuous struggle to affirm the cultural status and value of cinema to powerful museum benefactors and to win over Hollywood film studios' support in order to elevate cinema's status to that of a unique American art form. Wasson elaborates on MoMA's Film Library's effort to create modern audience for art cinema by employing overt disciplinary strategies. The staff of the Film Library, and sometimes Barry herself, carefully monitored the spectator's behavior in the cinematic salon, sanctioning improper conduct (e.g. rowdiness, excessive chatter or laughter during screening etc.) by, at times, even terminating the film screening altogether. These strategies, Wasson argues, sought to mold a new form of cinematic audience by instilling the values of "educated film viewing and studious attention".

Through her work at MoMA's Film Library, Barry gained recognition as one of the founding figures of the film preservation movement alongside Henri Langlois (in France) and Ernest Lindgren (in Great Britain).

On October 10, 2014, MoMA presented an illustrated talk by Robert Sitton, author of Lady in the Dark: Iris Barry and the Art of Film.

== Works ==
- Splashing into society. London: Constable, 1923
- Let's Go to the Movies (pdf via Internet Archive)
- D. W. Griffith: American Film Master. Museum of Modern Art. 1 January 2002. ISBN 978-0-87070-683-7.
- American Library Association; Iris Barry; Warner Bros. Pictures(1923-1967) (1946). The motion picture: a selected booklist.
- The Ezra Pound Period. The Bookman. October 1931.
- Portrait of Lady Mary Montagu, Indianapolis: Bobbs-Merrill, 1928 (First American Edition)
