= Harry Baird (actor) =

British actor (1931–2005)

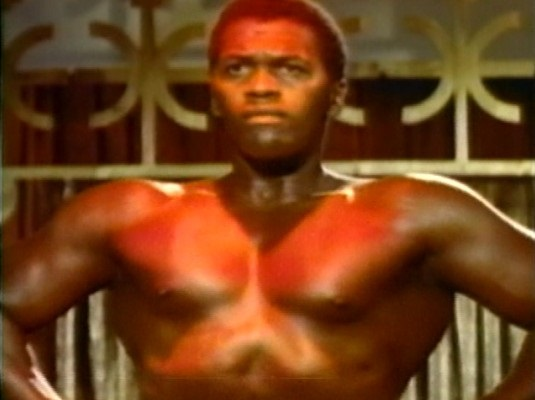
- Baird in Thor and the Amazon Women (1963)
- Born: 12 May 1931; Georgetown, British Guiana (now Guyana)
- Died: 13 February 2005 (aged 73); London, England
- Occupation: Actor
- Years active: 1954–1975

Harry Baird (12 May 1931 – 13 February 2005) was a Guyanese-British actor. He was one of a handful of Black actors to achieve prominence in British cinema during the 1950s and early 1960s, though he also saw success in French and Italian films. He notably starred as Lt Mark Bradley on the science-ficiton television series UFO.

== Early life ==
Baird was born in Georgetown in 1931. He was educated in Guiana, Canada, and Britain. At age 17, he moved to London to live with his brother, taking up bodybuilding and boxing at the local YMCA.

== Career ==
Aged 23,Baird made his first film appearance in 1955 as a boxer nicknamed 'Jamaica' in Carol Reed's A Kid for Two Farthings. A year later, he appeared in the play Kismet at the Stoll Theatre in London, and had a role in Jean Genet's The Blacks in 1961 at the Royal Court Theatre.

Baird subsequently appeared mostly in film and television, though other stage work included A Wreath for Udomo (Lyric Hammersmith, 1961) and Ogodiveleftthegason (Royal Court, 1967). He had stints with the Liverpool Repertory and Windsor Repertory.

His first lead role was as Atimbu, in the TV series White Hunter, in 1958. A series of stereotyped roles followed, in low-budget films featuring generic African or "jungle" themes. Baird's most high-profile role, however, came in Michael Relph and Basil Dearden's racial drama film Sapphire (1959). Prominent roles for black actors in Britain remained scarce, although he appeared in supporting roles in the TV series Danger Man and UFO (1970; as Lt Mark Bradley, a role that he left halfway through the programme's run). He saw greater success in Italy and France, where played an action hero in several peplum and Spaghetti Western films.

Baird's only true lead film role was in the 1968 Melvin Van Peebles drama The Story of a Three-Day Pass, in which he played an American soldier who falls in love with a white Parisian woman. Other roles included The Spy Who Came In from the Cold (1965), The Whisperers (1967), The Touchables (1968) (as a gay wrestler named Lillywhite), the horror film The Oblong Box (1969), and The Italian Job (1969) (as coach driver Big William) alongside his friend Michael Caine, whose wife, fellow Guyanese actor Shakira Baksh, Baird had appeared alongside in UFO.

His last appearance on screen was in the offbeat Spaghetti Western Four of the Apocalypse (I quattro dell'apocalisse), directed by Lucio Fulci, in 1975. He retired from acting by the end of the decade after being diagnosed with glaucoma, a condition which ultimately left him blind.

== Personal life ==
Despite his health issues, Baird continued working in the film industry as an assistant director (to Sidney Poitier on A Warm December) and as a sales rep and film distributor. He was close friends with actor Michael Caine. Later in his life, he took film studies classes at the Open University.

=== Death ===
Baird died of cancer in London in 2005.

== Selected filmography ==
- A Kid for Two Farthings (1955) – Jamaica (uncredited)
- Sapphire (1959) – Johnnie Fiddle
- Killers of Kilimanjaro (1959) – Boraga
- Tarzan the Magnificent (1960) – Warrior Leader
- Offbeat (1961) – Gill Hall
- The Mark (1961) – Cole
- Flame in the Streets (1961) – Billy
- The Road to Hong Kong (1962) – Nubian at Lamasary (uncredited)
- Station Six-Sahara (1963) – Sailor
- The Small World of Sammy Lee (1963) – Buddy Shine
- Taur the Mighty (1963) – Ubaratutu
- Thor and the Amazon Women (1963) -Ubaratutu
- Goliath and the Rebel Slave (1963) – Slave (uncredited)
- Traitor's Gate (1964) – Mate on Tramp Steamer
- He Who Rides a Tiger (1965) – Stan (uncredited)
- The Whisperers (1967) – The Man Upstairs
- The Story of a Three-Day Pass (1968) – Turner
- The Touchables (1968) – Lillywhite
- The Italian Job (1969) – Big William
- The Oblong Box (1969) – N'Galo
- Castle Keep (1969) – Dancing Soldier (uncredited)
- Cool It Carol! (1970) – Benny Gray
- Fun and Games (1971) – Carl
- Trinity and Sartana Are Coming (1972) – Trinità
- Those Dirty Dogs (1973) – Corp. Washington Smith
- The Count of Monte Cristo (1975) – Ali
- Four of the Apocalypse (1975) – Bud (final film role)
