= Dominique Lebrun (artist) =

French artist and cinema historian

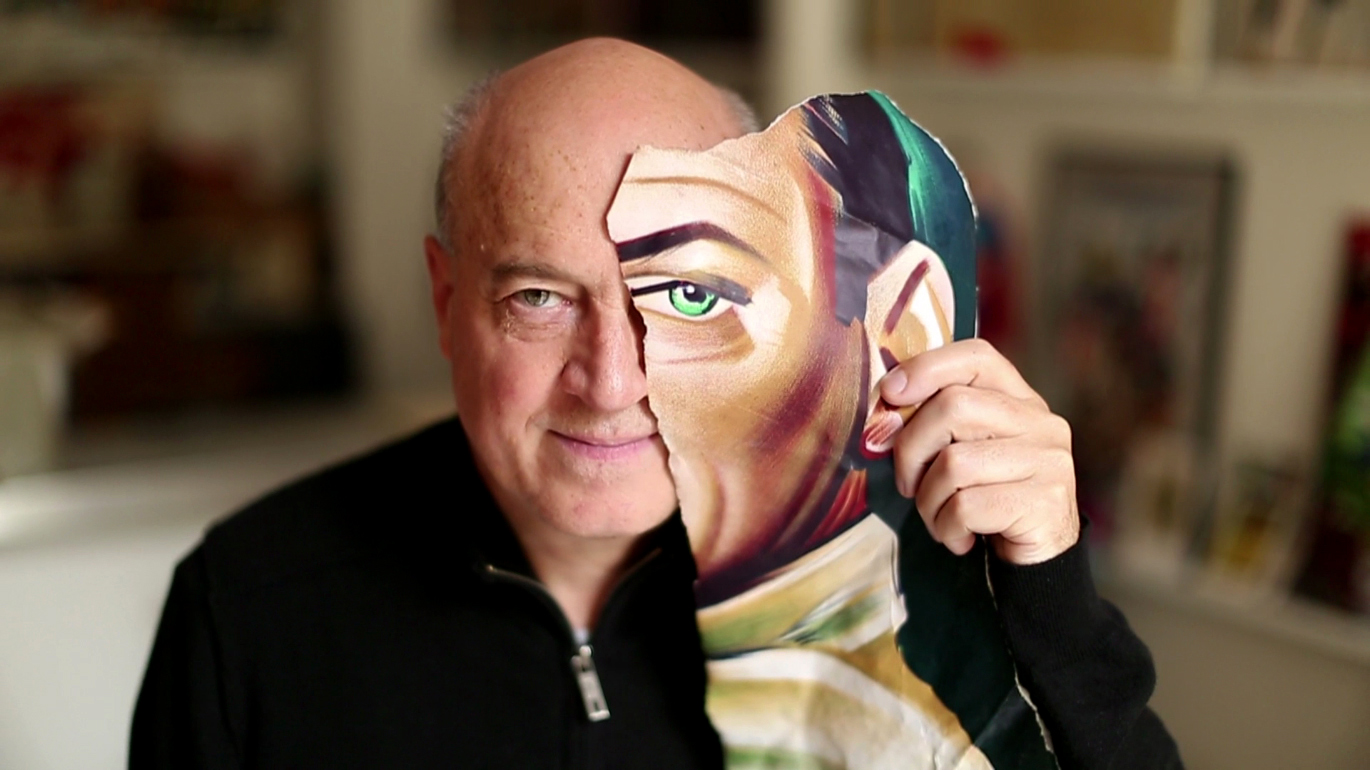
Dominique Lebrun in his studio in 2018

Dominique Lebrun (born 9 September 1950) is a French artist, journalist and historian of American cinema.

== Biography ==
Lebrun began collecting movie posters when he was 10, reclaiming them from local theaters. He also collected photos and movie magazines, including Cinémonde, out of which he cut photos of actors to paste them in his school notebooks.

In the early seventies, he moved to Paris and had many different occupations including projectionist at the Espace Pierre Cardin, archivist and researcher for producer André Paulvé and assistant for a primitive art gallery. He then became a cinema historian and journalist.

In 1972 and 1974, he took part in Monsieur Cinéma, a popular French television game show of movie trivia, hosted by Pierre Tchernia.

Paris Hollywood, his first film book, was published in 1987. It is a tribute to all the French actors, directors, technicians and writers who contributed to the history of American cinema. To write this book, Lebrun gathered photos and interviews in both Paris and Los Angeles, over a span of ten years.

For this work, Lebrun was invited in several French TV shows, including Apostrophes hosted by Bernard Pivot and Du Côté de chez Fred de Frédéric Mitterrand.

In 1992, Trans Europe Hollywood was published. In his second film book, he explores the contribution of Europeans to American Cinema.

In 1996, he wrote Hollywood, a history of Hollywood studios from 1914 to 1969, published both in French and English.

Over these years, Lebrun also contributed to the Catalogue du Musée du Cinéma Henri-Langlois, Paris museum of Cinema's catalogue, and the Dictionnaire de la Mode au XXe siècle, a dictionary of twentieth century fashion. He also performed in several short films including Cough Therapy and Antoine directed by Jean-Philippe Laraque.

He started his artistic work in 2008, and made his first collage using his collection of Mon Ciné 1920's movie magazines. He then decided to continue exploring this path, turning this time to his collection of movie posters.

In 2011, his first exhibition took place at Flora Jansen Gallery in Paris, on Matignon avenue. Since then, his work has been shown in exhibitions in Paris, Saint-Tropez and Bruxelles. In 2018, he made his U.S. debut in Los Angeles.

In June 2021, Lebrun Dechirures, a monography about his work, is published in Paris, including an exclusive text by French critic Pascal Mérigeau.

== Style, technique, and reception ==
Lebrun uses intact original film posters from his own collection. He tears them up, then pastes the pieces on canvas. He imagines and builds new stories, recomposing portraits, scenes or abstract figures.

He says that he uses pieces of posters like a painter uses colors; that through stacks and layers, he's trying to create motion; that he makes use of the image of stars or unknown actors, to conceive new characters, be they male, female or hybrid.

He talks about the unexpected and extreme pleasure he experiences, when tearing up and caressing paper; and about his urge to convey, through his work, emotions as intense as his passion for cinema.

== Exhibitions ==
- 2011 : Collages Galerie Flora Jansem, avenue Matignon, Paris
- 2014 : Purgatoire, rue de Paradis, Paris
- 2015 : Galerie Origine, rue des Ecouffes, Paris
- 2016 : Rips Galerie BY Chatel, rue des Tournelles, Paris
- 2016 : Hotel La Vigne, Ramatuelle
- 2017 : All My Movies Espace Beaurepaire, Paris
- 2017 : Saint-Tropez-des-Prés Hôtel de Paris, Saint-Tropez
- 2017 : The Cow Parade at the Movies La Baule - Dinard - Deauville
- 2018 : A Scent of Taboo Galerie Émilie Dujat, Bruxelles
- 2018 : Icon Remix THE LAB by Please Do Not Enter, Los Angeles
- 2019 : The Sixth Space THE LAB by Please Do Not Enter, Las Vegas
- 2019 : Palm Springs Fine Art Fair, by Please Do Not Enter, Palm Springs
- 2020 : 10 Years Already, B Gallery, Paris
- 2020 : Atelier Beyond The Walls, Espace Beaurepaire, Paris
- 2021 : Stars Destruction Transformations, Espace Beaurepaire, Paris

== Works ==
=== Bibliography ===
- 1987 : Paris-Hollywood, Hazan ISBN 9782850251368
- 1988 : L'élégance française au cinéma, Musée de la Mode et du Costume ISBN 9782901424130
- 1991 : Musée du Cinéma Henri-Langlois, Maeght ISBN 9782869411296
- 1992 : Trans Europe Hollywood - les européens du Cinéma américain, Bordas ISBN 9782040185589
- 1993 : Von Europa Nach Hollywood - Die Europäer im amerikanischen Kino Henschel Verlag ISBN 9783894871741
- 1994 : Dictionnaire de la Mode au ~~XX~~ (en collaboration), Éditions Du Regard ISBN 9782841050253
- 1996 : Hollywood, Hazan ISBN 9782850254628
- 1996 : Hollywood, Gingko ISBN 978-3927258327
- 2021 : Lebrun Dechirures ISBN 979-10-699-7237-7

=== Filmography ===
- 2003 : Cough Therapy, short film by Jean-Philippe Laraque
- 2006 : The Belly of the Bear, short film by Jean-Philippe Laraque
- 2007 : Antoine, short film by Jean-Philippe Laraque
- 2015 : Dominique Lebrun, Rips - MIFAC 2017 - International Contemporary Artists Film Festival
- 2016 : Dominique Lebrun Art Show – Saint Tropez des Prés
- 2018 : Dominique Lebrun Happening – A Scent of Taboo - Brussels
- 2020 : 10 Anni by Dominique Lebrun – video art directed by Jean-Philippe Laraque
- 2020 : Solito by Dominique Lebrun – video art directed by Jean-Philippe Laraque
