= Stuttering Sam =

American showgirl and writer

Mary Louise Dowell
- Born: December 14, 1914; Fort Worth, U.S.
- Died: April 9, 1963 (aged 48); New York City, U.S.
- Other name: Stuttering Sam
- Occupations: Showgirl, columnist, screenwriter
- Years active: 1936–1941
- Spouses: Sigmund Hindley (m. 1944) Guiles Copeland (m. 1954)

Mary Louise Dowell, better known by her stage name Stuttering Sam (14 December 1914 – 9 April 1963), was a Broadway showgirl, columnist for Fort Worth Star-Telegram, and Hollywood screenwriter.

== Life and career ==
Mary Louise Dowell was born in 1914 in Fort Worth in the family of a local police chief.

In 1936, Dowell was hired as a dancing girl for a Texas Centennial celebration in her home city, and soon after that, she came to the attention of the impresario Billy Rose, who brought her to New York City. She became a showgirl at his nightclub Diamond Horseshoe and earned the stage name "Stuttering Sam" because of her prominent stammer.

In 1941, she retired from stage and became a screenwriter in Hollywood, writing episodes for a TV crime drama series. In 1944, she married the broker and manufacturer Sigmund Hindley, and after Hidley's death, she married again in 1954. Her second husband was the advertising executive Guiles Copeland.

Dowell died in 1963 at the age of 48 from a rare blood disease.
