= Just an Old Sweet Song (film) =

- Directed by: Robert Ellis Miller
- Written by: Melvin Van Peebles
- Based on: Just an Old Sweet Song 1976 Novel
- Starring: Cicely Tyson; Robert Hooks
- Music by: Melvin Van Peebles
- Production company: Company Four
- Distributed by: MTM Enterprises
- Release date: September 14, 1976
- Running time: 77 minutes
- Country: US
- Language: English

Just an Old Sweet Song is a 1976 TV film by MTM Enterprises and Company Four, based on the novel of the same name that also came out in the same year. Melvin Van Pebbles, author of the novel, wrote the script and composed the music.

== Plot ==
A family from Detroit takes a two-week vacation in the south which makes multiple changes in their life they didn't think were possible.

== Cast ==
- Cicely Tyson as Precilla
- Robert Hooks as Nate
- Kevin Hooks as Junior
- Beah Richards as Grandma
- Eric Hooks as Highpockets
- Mary Alice as Helen
- Edward Binns as Mr. Claypool
- Sonny Jim Gaines as Trunk
- Minnie Gentry as Aunt Velvet

== Home media ==
United American Video released a VHS copy of the film on October 9, 1998.
