= Sony Hall =

Concert venue in Manhattan, New York

- The Diamond Horseshoe; Century Theatre; Mayfair Theatre; Stairway Theatre; Billy Rose's Diamond Horseshoe
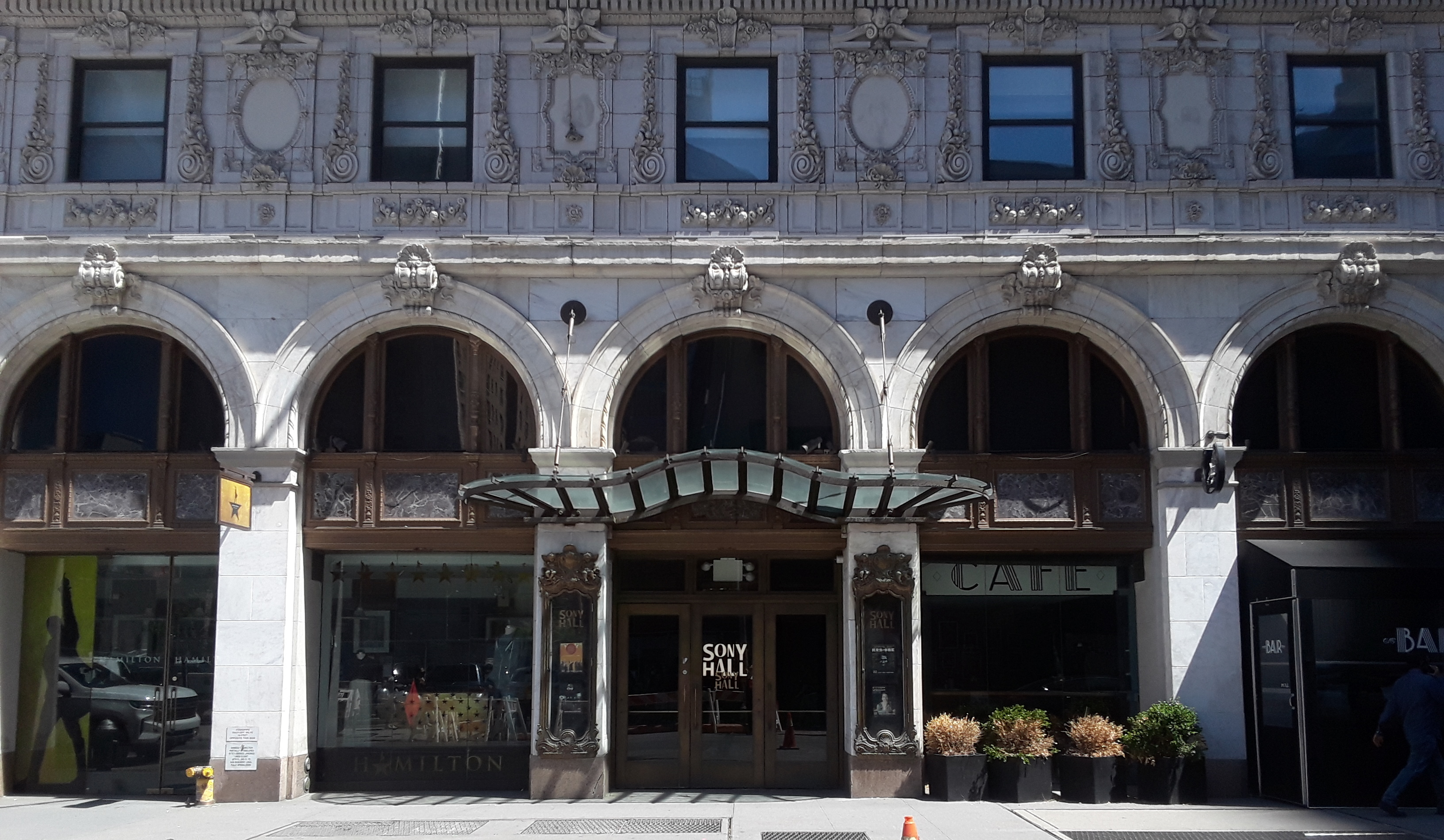
- The exterior of the Paramount Hotel. Sony Hall is located in the basement of this building.
- Interactive map of Sony Hall
- Address: 235 W. 46th St. New York City; United States
- Coordinates: 40°45′34″N 73°59′13″W
- Operator: Blue Note Entertainment Group
- Capacity: 1,000 standing, 500 seated
- Type: Former Broadway house
- Current use: Concert venue

Construction
- Opened: December 24, 1938

Website
- www.sonyhall.com

Sony Hall is a concert venue operated by Blue Note Entertainment Group located on West 46th Street in the Theater District, Manhattan, New York City. Like many theaters in NYC, it has served many functions since its opening in 1938. Located in the basement of the Paramount Hotel, it began as Billy Rose's Diamond Horseshoe nightclub where the 1945 film Diamond Horseshoe was filmed, and later spent time as a burlesque theater before becoming a legitimate Broadway theater under the names Century Theatre, Mayfair Theatre, and Stairway Theatre. As a Broadway theater, it is best known for the transfer of the Tony Award-winning original Broadway production of On Golden Pond in 1979. After becoming a private venue through the 1980s and remaining mostly closed through the 1990s and 2000s, it reemerged in 2013 after a 20-million-dollar renovation as a theater hosting the immersive production Queen of the Night. It is currently run as a live music performance venue showcasing audio and visual technology by Sony.

== History ==
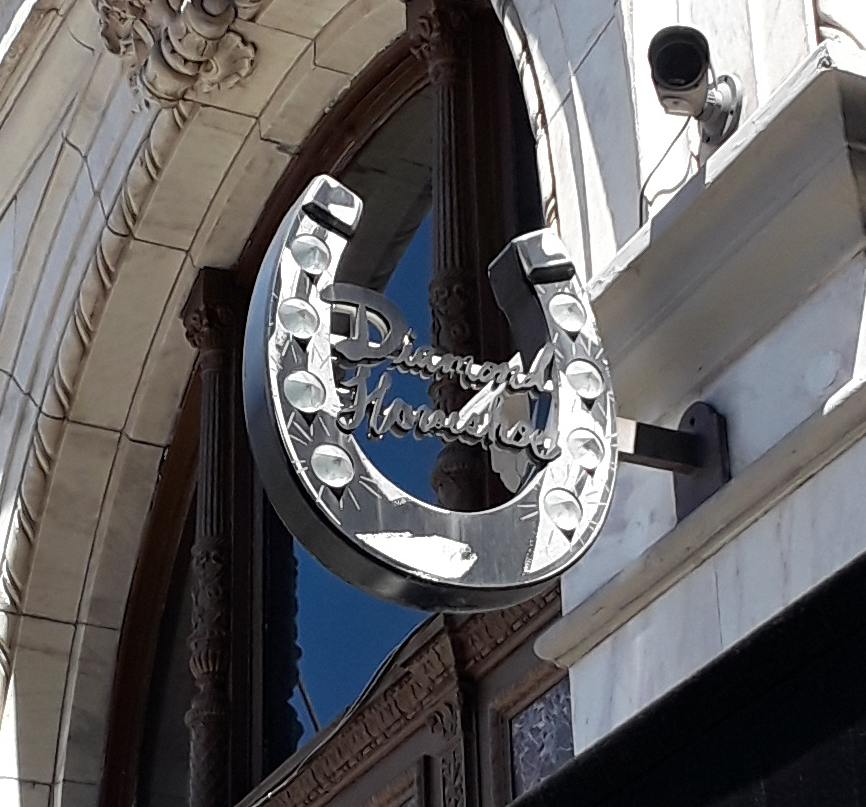
A disused sign on the exterior of the building for the "Diamond Horseshoe"

The Paramount Hotel was constructed in 1927 near Times Square. The French Renaissance-inspired building was the only hotel designed by Thomas W. Lamb who is mostly known for his theaters and cinemas. The hotel opened in 1928, and ten years later, on Christmas of 1938, Billy Rose opened a nightclub in the basement of the building, named Billy Rose's Diamond Horseshoe. Rose, a theatrical producer, was already well known for his work with the Ziegfeld Follies and with Oscar Hammerstein II on the large-scale production of Jumbo, but he also was the creating force behind themed nostalgic nightclubs in New York such as the Billy Rose Music Hall. The Diamond Horseshoe was one of these themed clubs with Rose designing it as a Gay Nineties saloon. The first show in the venue was The Turn of the Century, a romantic retelling of Diamond Jim Brady and Lillian Russell's relationship interspersed with burlesque acts. The club became well known for the "Long-Stemmed Roses", the scantily clad house chorus girls who were all over 6 ft 2 in (188 cm) tall, and was called by a critic at The New York Times, "the most zestful, gorgeous and lovable pleasure palace in town." Gene Kelly is known to have choreographed one performance of the Long-Stemmed Roses, W. C. Handy was a regular entertainer, and the club attracted, for example, Orson Welles and Sugar Ray Robinson.

1945 saw the premiere of Diamond Horseshoe, a film by George Seaton starring Betty Grable, set and filmed in the Diamond Horseshoe. The influence of this film could not keep the club afloat and it closed in 1951 due to shifts in taste in entertainment away from lavish revues and towards more intimate fare. For some time afterward, the basement operated as the Sonja Henie Ice Palace, with a skating rink.

The hotel's operators leased the Paramount's basement as a theater in December 1960. The space was operated by the partnership of Irving Maidman and Norman Twain. Russell Patterson renovated the basement into the Mayfair Theatre, a 299-seat off-Broadway venue. A skating rink was removed from the space and a 56-foot-wide (17 m) stage was installed, an unusually wide stage for an off-Broadway venue; the stage's width could be reduced to 26 feet (7.9 m) for intimate productions. The theater opened in March 1961 with the play Roots by Arthur Wesker. The Mayfair lasted two years before Maidman converted it to a cabaret. Maidman cited the large number of competing off-Broadway venues as a reason for the closure.

By 1969 the theater was being used to show burlesque and a new agreement specified that beginning April 25, 1970, the space would no longer be rented as "a Burlesque Theatre or for the exhibition of 'adult' or 'sex exploitation' films". Shortly after this agreement the space was renamed the Stairway Theatre and hosted two short-lived Broadway productions, The Castro Complex and A Place Without Doors over three months. These productions were not successful and in 1971 the theater returned to a burlesque house in violation of its lease.

Two theatrical productions were hosted between 1974 and 1976 under the moniker Mayfair Theatre, but in 1978, the theater was once again renamed, this time to the Century Theatre and began presenting Broadway caliber theater once more. The most notable production of this time period was the transfer of the original Broadway production of On Golden Pond in 1979, which won a Tony Award for Best Actress in a Play for Frances Sternhagen as well as the Drama Desk Award for Outstanding New Play. The theater's run as a Broadway house ended in 1982 with Waltz of the Stork, a musical written and performed by Melvin Van Peebles.

Throughout the 1980s the theater was used for a few notable special events including the memorial luncheon for Andy Warhol in 1987 and Vanity Fair's fifth-anniversary celebration in 1988. Over the next few decades there were attempts to reimagine the space as concert halls, supper clubs, and discotechs but each attempt failed due to costs and other issues. Mostly the space sat empty and slowly decayed.

In 2011 the developer Aby Rosen purchased the Paramount Hotel and, after a 20-million-dollar renovation, the theater reopened in 2013 on New Year's Eve as the Diamond Horseshoe. The new incarnation of the space was specifically designed for the new immersive theater piece Queen of the Night, produced by Randy Weiner and Simon Hammerstein, the creators of The Box and instruments in bringing Sleep No More from London to New York. Giovanna Battaglia, the creative director of Queen of the Night, called the redesign of the space, "a cross between a church, an opera house, and a bordello." The renovations included "hammered-gold floors, green velvet stage curtains held back by four-foot-long hands, and a bejeweled ceiling inspired by Catholic monstrances." Most original elements in the room were not able to be preserved due to deterioration. The lavish production, which was loosely based on Mozart's The Magic Flute, was directed by scenic designer Christine Jones, and the title role was performed by Martha Graham Dance Company principal dancer Katherine Crockett.

Queen of the Night ran for exactly two years, closing on December 31, 2015. For the next few years the theater existed as a private venue until reopening on March 27, 2018, as Sony Hall, a concert venue. This new space is run by Blue Note Entertainment Group, who also run New York's Highline Ballroom, in partnership with Sony. Many of the design elements introduced for Queen of the Night were retained, only minor paint and upholstery details were changed as well as extending the stage slightly into the room. The real changes came in the audio visual realm as Sony used the hall to showcase new sound, video, and listening technologies it developed, and introduced a new street level cafe. The current 12,000 square foot (1,100 m^{2}) venue includes a full-service restaurant and bar and can hold 1,000 people standing or 500 people seated. The first concert in the renovated space was by MGMT, a Sony Music-signed rock band.

== Design ==
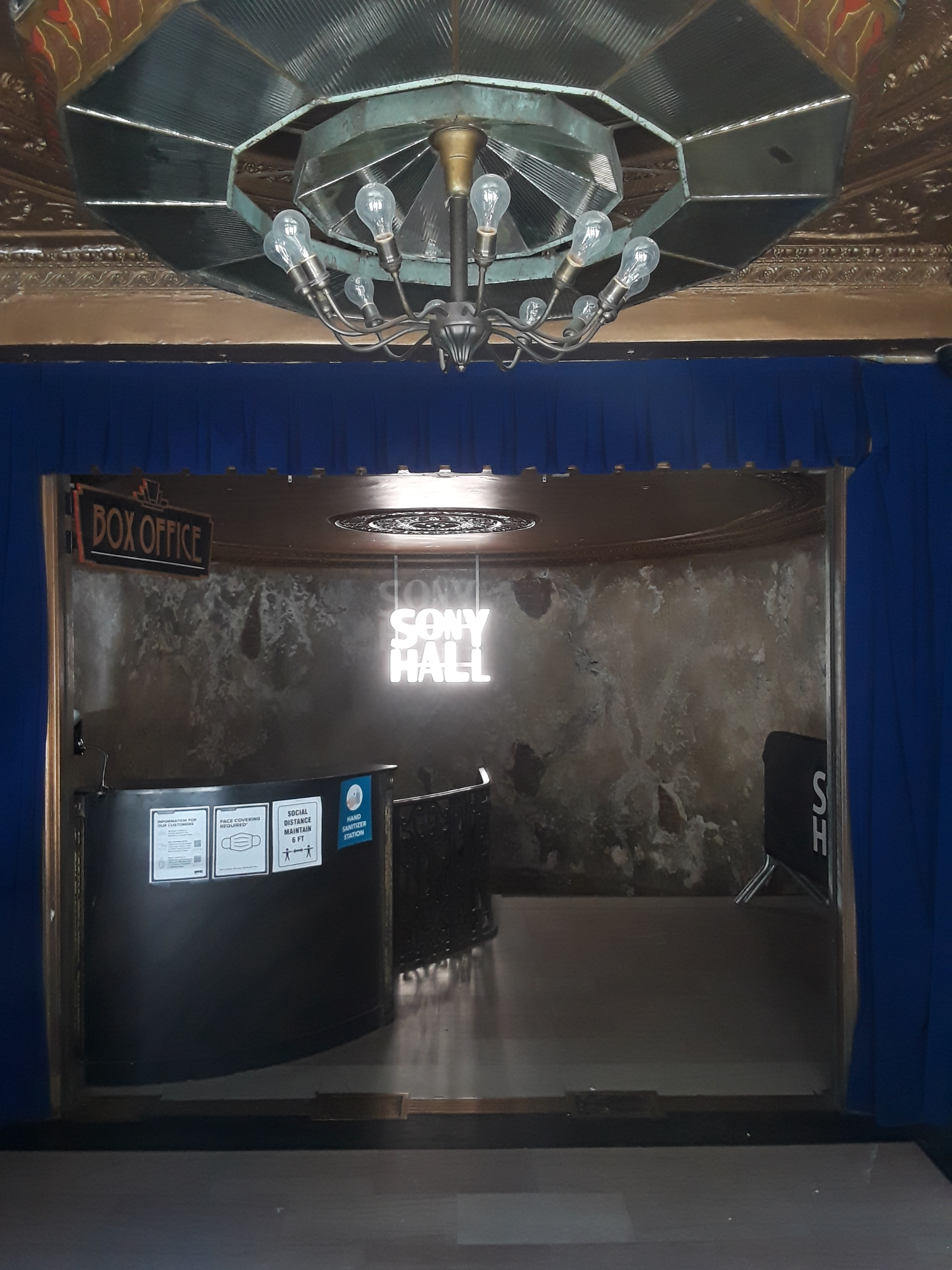
The street level lobby of Sony Hall

The original incarnation of the space was designed by Thomas W. Lamb as a nostalgic take on a saloon from the 1890s, including walls painted deep red and white, period-appropriate light fixtures, and posters of vaudeville stars dotting the walls. This interior crumbled due to years of neglect and most original elements in the theater were not able to be preserved due to deterioration. Due to the state of the hall, it was gutted as part of its renovation for the 2013 production of Queen of the Night. This renovation and redesign was carried out by architectural firm Stonehill & Taylor with Meg Sharpe designing the interiors, creative direction by Giovanna Battaglia, and Douglas Little designing the production's scenery. Due to the nature of immersive theater, the Queen of the Night scenery was fully integrated into the architecture, but edited out during the minor 2018 Sony Hall renovations. The overall design nods to the real history of the space while infusing an imagined history created for the production of Queen of the Night.

The exterior of the hall is marked by one of a pair of ornate marquees that were installed as part of the 2013 renovation, with the other marking the entrance to the Paramount Hotel. Once inside, the entrance to Sony Hall is down a grand marble staircase, restored in 2013, which has been distressed with scenic painting techniques to appear more dilapidated than it truly is. The base of the stairs features preserved bronze display cases, and the entrance door has knobs in the shapes of hands with open palms.

Once inside, the main room's interior, while largely new construction, takes design cues from Lamb's original intent. The lunettes and frieze recall the former design of the space, and the grand ceiling design draws precise inspiration from the original ceiling. While the whole space is designed with curves to give a sense of motion, this is most noticeable in the highly ornamental ceiling. This ceiling breaks classical architectural traditions and is designed with multiple domes and trim framing out a center ellipse containing a fiber optic night sky that gives the illusion of volume.

The walls are lined with antique faceted mirrors above curving banquette seating built in tiers with additional curving railings. Additional raised seating pods dot the space and, according to an article on Architizer, the bar is designed to resemble an "intricate 19th century distillery with tubes and flasks traveling up the walls and along the ceiling".

== Production history ==
Theater name	Production	opened	closed	ref
The Diamond Horseshoe Century Theatre	Queen of the Night	December 31, 2013	December 31, 2015	
Century Theatre	Waltz of the Stork	January 5, 1982	May 23, 1982	
Century Theatre	A Taste of Honey	June 24, 1981	November 8, 1981	
Century Theatre	Heartland	February 23, 1981	March 15, 1981	
Century Theatre	Emlyn Williams as Charles Dickens	January 14, 1981	February 1, 1981	
Century Theatre	Banjo Dancing	October 21, 1980	November 30, 1980	
Century Theatre	Of the Fields, Lately	May 27, 1980	June 1, 1980	
Century Theatre	On Golden Pond	September 12, 1979	April 20, 1980	
Century Theatre	Lone Star & Pvt. Wars	June 7, 1979	August 5, 1979	
Century Theatre	Manny	April 18, 1979	May 13, 1979	
Century Theatre	Are You Now or Have You Ever Been	February 6, 1979	March 4, 1979	
Century Theatre	Taxi Tales	December 28, 1978	December 31, 1978	
Century Theatre	The American Dance Machine	June 14, 1978	December 3, 1978	
Century Theatre	Patio / Porch	April 13, 1978	April 30, 1978	
Mayfair Theatre	Dance With Me	January 23, 1975	January 4, 1976	
Mayfair Theatre	Tubstrip	October 31, 1974	November 17, 1974	
Stairway Theatre	A Place Without Doors	December 22, 1970	January 16, 1971	
Stairway Theatre	The Castro Complex	November 18, 1970	November 22, 1970	
