= Classified X =

- Directed by: Mark Daniels
- Written by: Melvin Van Peebles
- Narrated by: Melvin Van Peebles
- Release date: 1998
- Country: United States

Classified X is a 1998 French-US documentary movie written by Melvin Van Peebles, directed by Mark Daniels and narrated by Van Peebles, that details the history of black people in American cinema throughout the 20th century. According to the review in Variety:

"... Van Peebles' distinctive analyses and his ever-growing importance to new black helmers via 1971's breakthrough Sweet Sweetback's Baadasssss Song make this a package with shelf life for cinematheques, schools and select broadcaster webs.... Scaredy-cat comedy-relief types, jungle "savages," mammies and minstrels (Van Peebles acidly observes that Caucasian players "put on blackface when they felt like doing something extra-stupid") gave way after World War II to "The New Negro" -- a put-upon "keeper of conscience" for the white protagonists. Pic briefly exits Hollywood to consider the independent black cinema that flourished -- with strict low-budget bounds -- from silent days till the late '40s, supported by a network of blacks-only theaters."

The documentary includes footage from the following movies:

- The Palm Beach Story
- Africa Screams
- The Birth of a Nation
- Casablanca
- Cry Freedom
- The Defiant Ones
- Gone with the Wind
- Guess Who's Coming to Dinner
- The Jazz Singer
- Shaft (1971)
