= Melvin Van Peebles =

American actor and filmmaker (1932–2021)

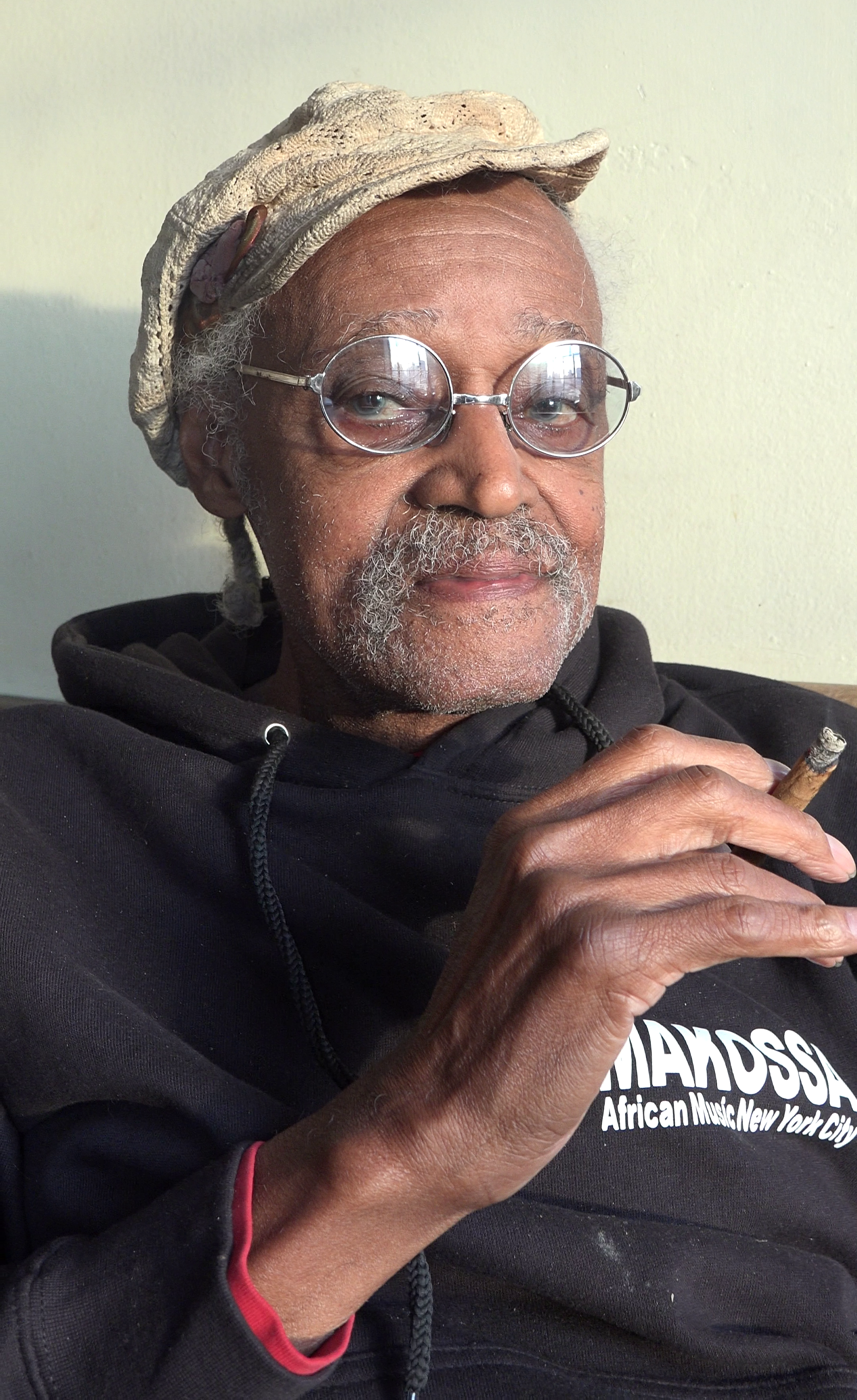
- Van Peebles in 2015
- Born: Melvin Peebles; August 21, 1932; Chicago, Illinois, U.S.
- Died: September 21, 2021 (aged 89); New York City, U.S.
- Other names: Brer Soul; Block
- Education: Ohio Wesleyan University (BA)
- Occupations: Actor; director; screenwriter; playwright; producer; composer
- Years active: 1955–2021
- Spouse: Maria Marx
- Children: 3, including Mario
- Relatives: Mandela Van Peebles (grandson)

Melvin Van Peebles (born Melvin Peebles; August 21, 1932 – September 21, 2021) was an American actor, filmmaker, writer, and composer. His feature film debut, The Story of a Three-Day Pass (1967), was based on his own French-language novel La Permission and was shot in France, as it was difficult for a black American director to get work at the time. The film won an award at the San Francisco International Film Festival which gained him the interest of Hollywood studios, leading to his American feature debut Watermelon Man, in 1970. Eschewing further overtures from Hollywood, he used the successes he had so far to bankroll his work as an independent filmmaker.

In 1971, he released his best-known work, creating and starring in the film Sweet Sweetback's Baadasssss Song, which led to the creation of the blaxploitation genre, although critic Roger Ebert did not consider this example of Van Peebles' work to be an exploitation film. He followed this up with the musical, Don't Play Us Cheap, based on his own stage play, and continued to make films, write novels and stage plays in English and in French through the next several decades; his final films include the French-language film Le Conte du ventre plein (2000) and the absurdist film Confessionsofa Ex-Doofus-ItchyFooted Mutha (2008). His son, filmmaker and actor Mario Van Peebles, appeared in several of his works and portrayed him in the 2003 biographical film Baadasssss!.

== Early life and education ==
Born Melvin Peebles on August 21, 1932, in Chicago, he was the son of Edwin Griffin and Marion Peebles. In 1953, he graduated with a B.A. in literature from Ohio Wesleyan University and, 13 days later, joined the United States Air Force, serving for three and a half years. He added "Van" to his name when he lived in the Netherlands in his late 20s.

== Career ==
=== Early years ===
Van Peebles worked as a cable car gripman in San Francisco, California. Later, he wrote about these experiences. His first book, The Big Heart, credited to Melvin Van, evolved from a small article and a series of photographs taken by Ruth Bernhard.

According to Van Peebles, a passenger suggested that he should become a filmmaker. Van Peebles shot his first short film, Pickup Men for Herrick in 1957 and made two more short films during the same period. About these films, Van Peebles said: "I thought they were features. Each one turned out to be eleven minutes long. I was trying to do features. I knew nothing." As he learned more about the filmmaking process, he found out that "I could make a feature for five hundred dollars. That was the cost of 90 minutes of film. I didn't know a thing about shooting a film sixteen to one or ten to one or none of that shit. Then I forgot you had to develop film. And I didn't know you needed a work print. All I can say is that after I did one thing he would say, 'Well, aren't you gonna put sound on it?' and I would go, 'Oh shit!' That's all I could say."

After Van Peebles completed his first short films, he took them with him to Hollywood to try to find work, but was unable to find anyone who wanted to hire him as a director. Van Peebles decided to move his family to the Netherlands where he planned to study astronomy. On the way to Europe, in New York City, he met Amos Vogel, founder of the avant-garde Cinema 16 who agreed to place two of Van Peebles's shorts in his rental catalog. Vogel screened Van Peebles's Three Pickup Men for Herrick at Cinema 16 on a program with City of Jazz in the spring of 1960 with Ralph Ellison leading a post-film discussion.

When Vogel went to Paris shortly after, he brought Van Peebles's films to show Henri Langlois and Mary Meerson at the Cinémathèque Française. Meanwhile, in the Netherlands, Van Peebles's marriage dissolved and his wife and children went back to the United States. Shortly thereafter, Van Peebles was invited to Paris probably by Mary Meerson and/or Lotte Eisner, founders of the Cinémathèque Française, on the strength of his short films. In France, Van Peebles created the short film Les Cinq Cent Balles (500 Francs) (1961) and then established himself as a writer. He did investigative reporting for France Observateur during 1963–64, during which he profiled, and later became friends with, Chester Himes. Himes got him a job at the anti-authoritarian humor magazine Hara-kiri, where Van Peebles wrote a monthly column and eventually joined the editorial board.

=== 1965–1970 ===
In 1965 and 1966, Mad magazine attempted a French edition and hired Van Peebles as editor-in-chief during its run of only five issues. He began to write plays in French, utilizing the sprechgesang form of songwriting, where the lyrics were spoken over the music. This style carried over to Van Peebles' debut album, Brer Soul.

Van Peebles was a prolific writer in France. He published four novels and a collection of short stories. He completed at least one play, La Fête à Harlem which was also released as a novel, and which he would later make into the musical Don't Play Us Cheap (1970). Roger Blin directed La Fête à Harlem with the Les Griots theatrical troupe for the Festival du jeune théâtre in Liège, Belgium in September 1964. Van Peebles made his first feature-length film, The Story of a Three-Day Pass (La Permission) (1968) based on a novel by the same title. The film caught the attention of Hollywood producers who mistook him for a French auteur after it won an award at the San Francisco International Film Festival as the French entry. Van Peebles's first Hollywood film was the 1970 Columbia Pictures comedy Watermelon Man, written by Herman Raucher. Starring Godfrey Cambridge, the movie tells the story of a casually racist white man who suddenly wakes up black and finds himself alienated from his friends, family, and job.

=== 1970–1995 ===
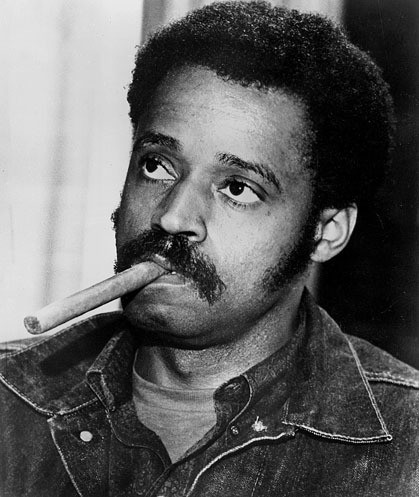
Van Peebles c. 1970

After Watermelon Man, Van Peebles became determined to have complete control over his next production, which became the groundbreaking Sweet Sweetback's Baadasssss Song (1971), privately funded with his own money, and in part by a $50,000 loan from Bill Cosby. Van Peebles not only directed, scripted, and edited the film, but wrote the score and directed the marketing campaign. The film grossed $15 million. was, among many others, acclaimed by the Black Panthers for its political resonance with the black struggle. His son Mario's 2003 film BAADASSSSS! tells the story behind the making of Sweet Sweetback's Baadasssss Song; father and son presented the film together as the Closing Night selection for Maryland Film Festival 2004.

Van Peebles wrote the book, music, and lyrics for the stage musical Ain't Supposed to Die a Natural Death, which opened off-Broadway and then moved to Broadway, running for 325 performances in 1971–72. The show was nominated for seven Tony Awards, including Best Musical, Best Book of a Musical, and Best Original Score.

As his intended follow-up to Sweet Sweetback's Baadasssss Song, Van Peebles made the musical film Don't Play Us Cheap. The film was an adaptation of an earlier stage musical of the same name which Van Peebles had created for performances at San Francisco State College in November 1970. At the time of the film's creation in 1971, a Broadway production of the stage musical was not planned, but the failure to find a distributor for the completed film led to Van Peebles' decision to bring the musical to Broadway in 1972 for a production of the play at the Ethel Barrymore Theatre. Van Peebles performed the same duties as his previous stage musical, as well as producing and directing. The show ran for 164 performances in 1972, earning Van Peebles another Tony nomination for Best Book of a Musical. The previously shot film version was later released on January 1, 1973.

In 1977, Van Peebles was one of four credited screenwriters on the film Greased Lightning, about the life of pioneering Black NASCAR driver Wendell Scott. He was originally the director of the film as well, but was replaced by Michael Schultz.

Van Peebles was involved with two more Broadway musicals in the 1980s. He was a co-writer on the book for Reggae, which closed after 21 performances in 1980. For Waltz of the Stork, he wrote book, music, and lyrics, as well as producing the show and playing the lead role. It ran for 160 performances in 1982.

In the 1980s, Van Peebles became an options trader on the American Stock Exchange while continuing to work in theater and film.

In 1995, he co-starred in the American live-action version of Japanese manga Fist of the North Star, alongside Gary Daniels, Costas Mandylor, Chris Penn, Isako Washio, Malcolm McDowell, Downtown Julie Brown, Dante Basco, Tracey Walter, Clint Howard, Tony Halme, and Big Van Vader.

=== 2005–2009 ===
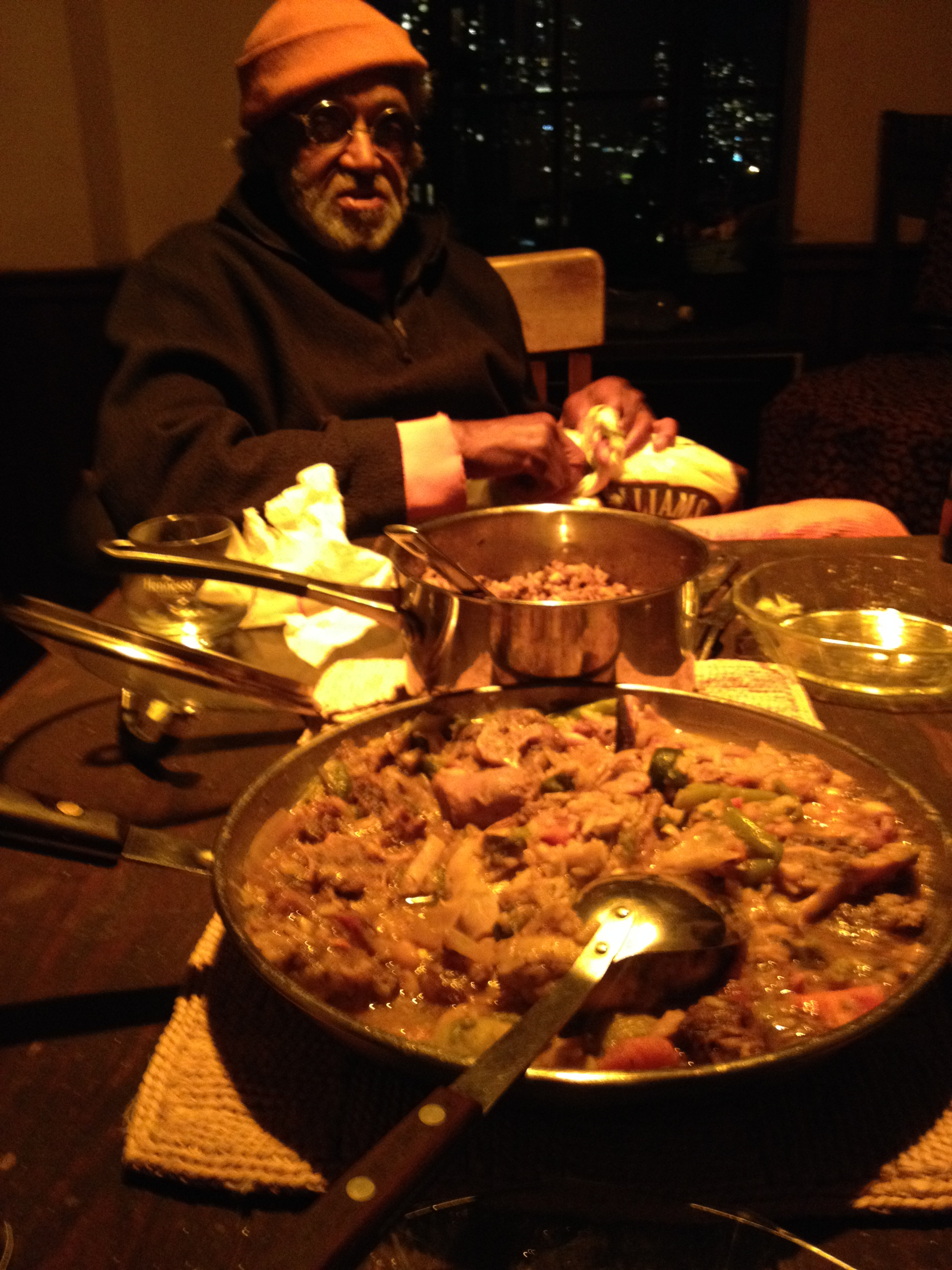
Van Peebles with some of his home cooking, a "hobo stew"

In 2005, Van Peebles was the subject of a documentary entitled How to Eat Your Watermelon in White Company (and Enjoy It). Also in 2005, Van Peebles was the subject of the documentary Unstoppable: Conversation with Melvin Van Peebles, Gordon Parks, and Ossie Davis, which also featured Ossie Davis and Gordon Parks in the same room. It was moderated by Warrington Hudlin.

In 2005, it was announced that Van Peebles would collaborate with Madlib for a proposed double album titled Brer Soul Meets Quasimoto. However, no further news was ever issued about this project.

In 2008, Van Peebles completed the film Confessionsofa Ex-Doofus-ItchyFooted Mutha, which was the Closing Night selection for Maryland Film Festival 2008, and appeared on All My Children as Melvin Woods, the father of Samuel Woods, a character portrayed by his son, Mario.

In an interview, Van Peebles said :

I make movies, I do music and everything else like I cook. I put in what I like, in case nobody else wants to eat it and I have to eat it for the rest of the week. I write a play or something and I hope people are going to like it, but if they don't, I do. I can sit there and watch Sweetback or Don't Play Us Cheap and have a good old time. The worst thing you can ever have is do something for others and they don't like it anyway, then you're really f---ed [laughter].

In 2009, Van Peebles became involved with a project to adapt Sweet Sweetback into a musical. A preliminary version of this was staged at the Apollo Theater on April 25–26, 2009. As well, he wrote and performed in a stage musical, Unmitigated Truth: Life, a Lavatory, Loves, and Ladies, which featured some of his previous songs as well as some new material.

=== 2011–2019 ===
In 2011, Van Peebles started doing shows in NYC with members of Burnt Sugar, under the name Melvin Van Peebles wid Laxative. Van Peebles said that the band is called Laxative because they "make shit happen". In November 2011, Melvin Van Peebles wid Laxative performed his song "Love, That's America" at Zebulon Cafe Concert, two weeks after the venue showed the original video for this song involving Occupy Wall Street footage, which was uploaded to YouTube in October 2011.

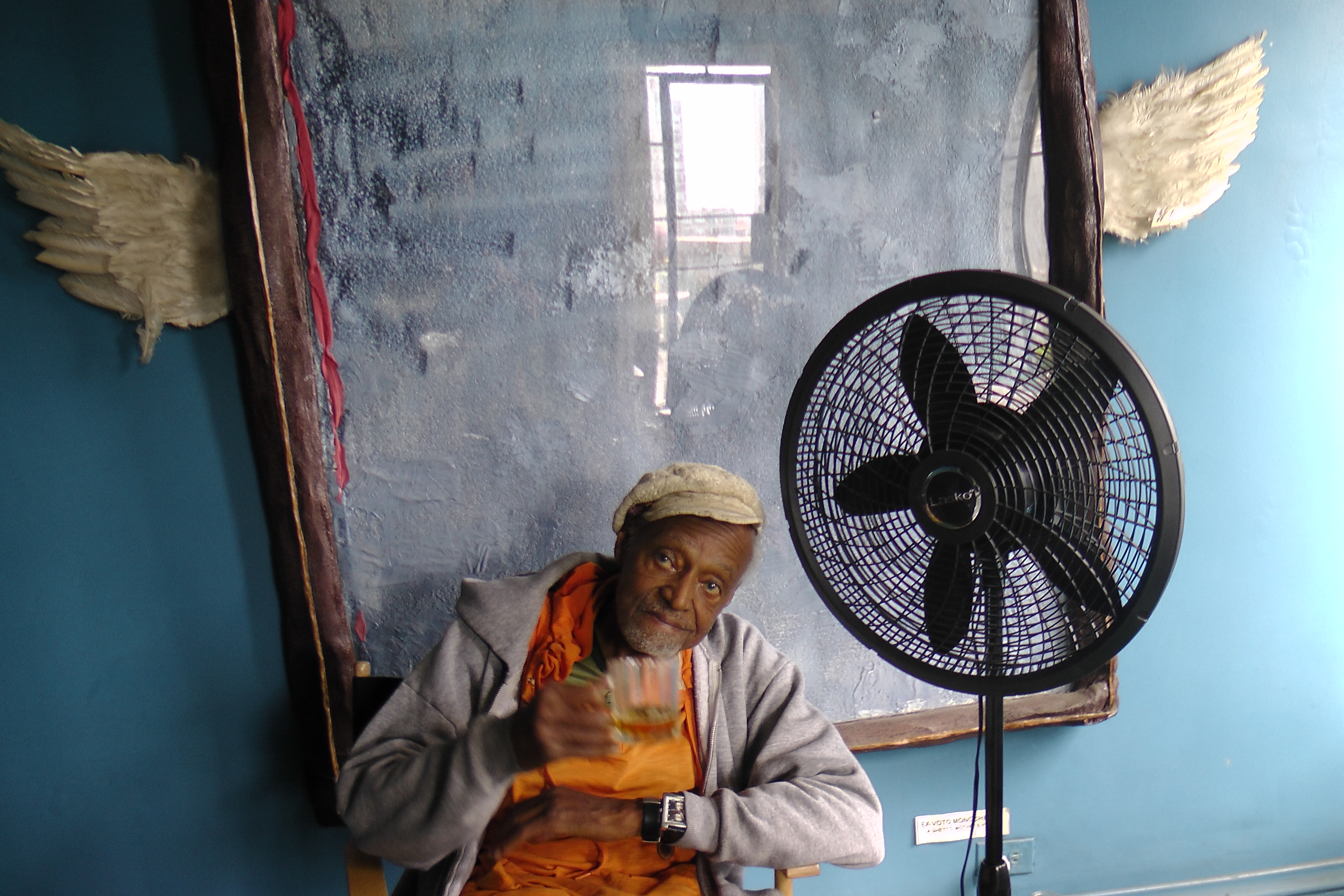
Van Peebles in front of his artwork, A Ghetto Mother's Prayer, in 2017

On August 21, 2012, Van Peebles distributed a new album, on vinyl only, called Nahh... Nahh Mofo. This album was distributed at his birthday celebration at Film Forum. On November 10, 2012, he released a video for the song "Lilly Done the Zampoughi Every Time I Pulled Her Coattail" to go with the album, which was announced on his Facebook page.

In September 2013, Van Peebles made his public debut as a visual artist, as a part of a gallery featured called "eMerge 2.0: Melvin Van Peebles & Artists on the Cusp". It features "Ex-Voto Monochrome (A Ghetto Mother's Prayer)", one of many pieces of art he created to be on display in his home.

In 2017, Methane Momma, a short film directed by Alain Rimbert, featured Van Peebles and his narration of poetic work with accompaniment of music by The Heliocentrics.

In 2019, Burnt Sugar presented the film Sweetback in Brooklyn while playing their own interpretation of the soundtrack. Van Peebles appeared at the presentation.

== Personal life and death ==
Van Peebles married Maria Marx, a German actress. They lived in Mexico for a period in the late 1950s, where he painted portraits and their son, actor and director Mario Van Peebles, was born. The family subsequently returned to the United States.

Van Peebles died on September 21, 2021, aged 89, at his home in Manhattan.

== Awards and honors ==
- 1967: Critics' Choice Award for The Story of a Three-Day Pass. San Francisco Film Festival.
- 1972: Most Promising Book, Winner for Ain't Supposed to Die a Natural Death. Drama Desk Awards.
- 1972: Best Score from an Original Cast Album, two nominations for Ain't Supposed to Die a Natural Death. 15th Annual Grammy Awards.
- 1972: Best Book of a Musical and Best Original Score, two nominations for Ain't Supposed to Die a Natural Death, 26th Tony Awards.
- 1973: Best Book of a Musical, nomination for Don't Play Us Cheap, 27th Tony Awards.
- 1976: Black Filmmakers Hall of Fame
- 1987: Humanitas Prize for screenwriting and Daytime Emmy for Writing (Children's Special) - ''The Day They Came to Arrest the Book,'' a CBS Schoolbreak Special
- 1993: Distinguished Achievement Citation, Ohio Wesleyan University
- 1994: Honorary doctorate of humane letters, Hofstra University
- 1999: Lifetime Achievement Award. 6th Annual Chicago Underground Film Festival.
- 2001: Commander of the Legion of Honour (French Legion of Honour)
- 2008: Tribute Award from the Independent Filmmaker Project (IFP) and the Museum of Modern Art (MoMA). Gotham Awards.
- 2021: The "Melvin Van Peebles Trailblazer Award," was named in honor of Van Peebles at the Critics Choice Association's fourth annual Celebration of Black Cinema & Television.
- 2022: Honoree, 2nd Annual Attorney Benjamin Crump Equal Justice Now Awards

== Published works ==
- (As "Melvin Van") The Big Heart, San Francisco: Fearon, 1957. With photographs by Ruth Bernhard, a book about life on San Francisco's cable cars. "A cable car is a big heart with people for blood. The people pump on and off—if you think of it like that it is pretty simple" (p. 21).
- Un Ours pour le F.B.I. (1964); A Bear for the F.B.I., Trident, 1968.
- Un Américain en enfer (1965); The True American, Doubleday, 1976.
- La Reine des Pommes (1965); French translation and illustrations for a graphic novel adaptation of Chester Himes' A Rage in Harlem.
- Le Chinois du XIV^{e} (1966) (short stories), illustrated by Roland Topor
- La Fête à Harlem (Harlem Party) (1967) (novel)
- La Permission (1967)
- Sweet Sweetback's Baadasssss Song, Lancer Books, New York, 1971.
- Ain't Supposed to Die a Natural Death, Bantam, New York, 1973.
- Don't Play Us Cheap: A Harlem Party, Bantam Books, New York, 1973.
- Just an Old Sweet Song, Ballantine, New York, 1976.
- Bold Money: A New Way to Play the Options Market, Warner Books, New York, 1986, ISBN 0-446-51340-7 (nonfiction)
- Melvin and Mario Van Peebles: No Identity Crisis, A Fireside Book, Simon & Schuster, New York, 1990.
- Panther, Thunder's Mouth Press, 1995.
- Introduction to the 1998 edition of Chester Himes' Yesterday Will Make You Cry, 1997.
- Confessions of a Ex Doofus Itchy Footed Mutha, New York: Akashic Books, 2009, ISBN 9781933354866. With illustrations by Caktuz Tree, a graphic novel adaptation of the film with the same title.

== Filmography ==
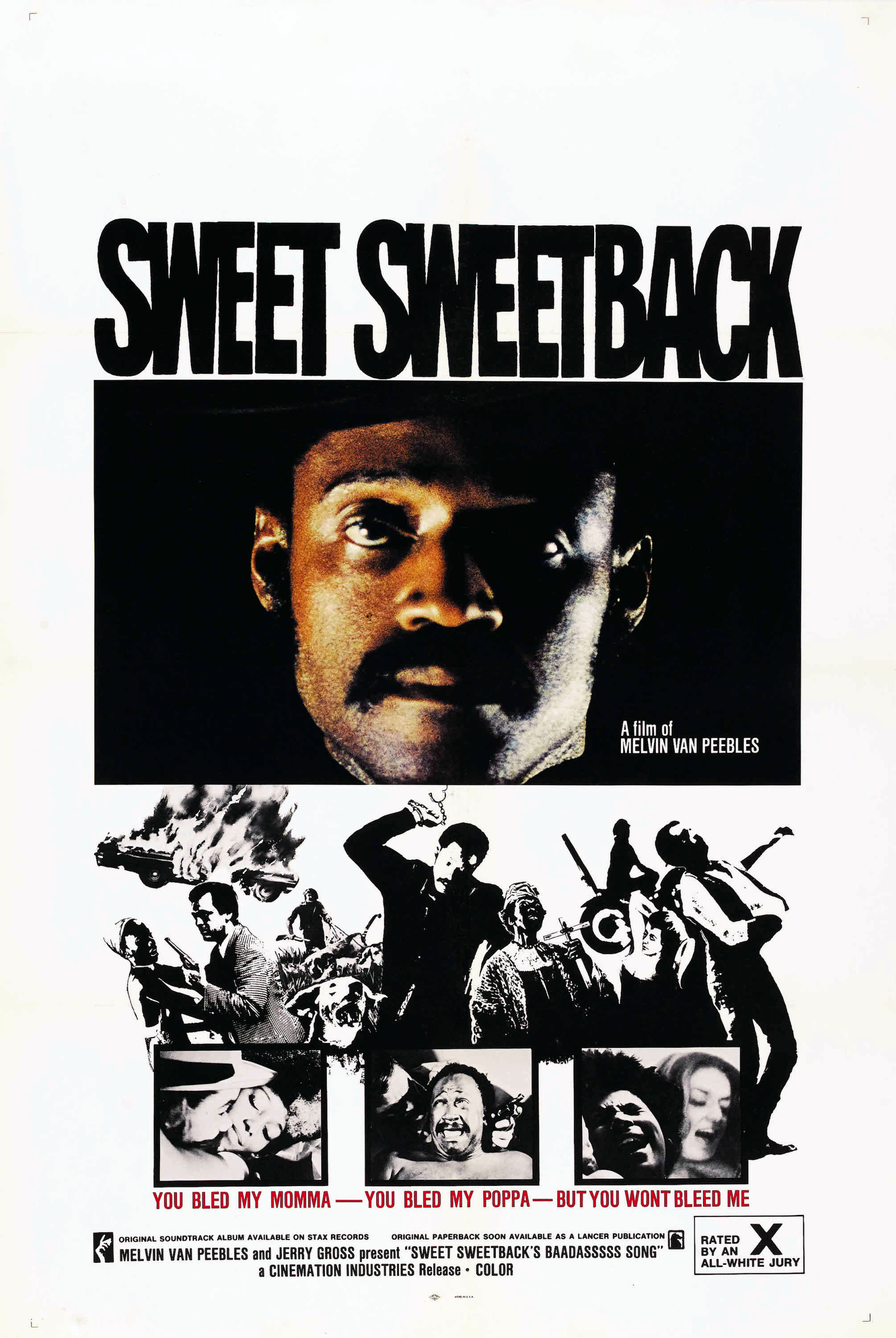
Peebles' 1971 film Sweet Sweetback's Baadasssss Song received acclaim from black rights groups for its political resonance with the black struggle and grossed $10 million.

| Year | Film | Credited as | | | | Notes |
| Year | Film | Director | Producer | Writer | Composer | Notes |
|---|---|---|---|---|---|---|
| 1957 | Three Pickup Men for Herrick | Yes | Yes | Yes | Yes | Short |
| 1957 | Sunlight | Yes | Yes | Yes | Yes | Short |
| 1961 | Les cinq cent balles (500 Francs) | Yes | No | Yes | Yes | Short; included in a 2023 Icarus Films collection, Early Short Films of the French New Wave |
| 1967 | The Story of a Three-Day Pass (also known as La Permission) | Yes | No | Yes | Yes | from his novel La Permission |
| 1969 | Slogan | No | No | Yes | No | Screenwriter, Directed by Pierre Grimblat. |
| 1970 | Watermelon Man | Yes | No | No | Yes | |
| 1971 | Sweet Sweetback's Baadasssss Song | Yes | Yes | Yes | Yes | also actor and editor |
| 1973 | Don't Play Us Cheap | Yes | Yes | Yes | Yes | also editor |
| 1976 | Just an Old Sweet Song (also known as Down Home) | No | No | Yes | Yes | made for television; screenwriter and theme song |
| 1977 | Greased Lightning | No | No | Yes | No | screenwriter |
| 1981 | The Sophisticated Gents | No | Yes | Yes | No | made for television; actor, screenwriter, song "Greased Lightning" and associate producer |
| 1987 | The Day They Came to Arrest the Book | No | No | Yes | No | made for television; screenwriter; based on 1982 novel by Nat Hentoff |
| 1989 | Identity Crisis | Yes | Yes | No | No | Also actor and co-editor |
| 1995 | Panther | No | Yes | Yes | No | based on his novel Panther, also actor |
| 1996 | Vrooom Vroom Vroooom | Yes | Yes | Yes | Yes | later included in Tales of Erotica, also known as Erotic Tales. Also editor |
| 1996 | Gang in Blue | Yes | Yes | No | No | Co-director and also actor |
| 1998 | Melvin Van Peebles' Classified X | No | No | Yes | No | Documentary; screenwriter, actor and executive producer |
| 2000 | Le Conte du ventre plein (also known as Bellyful) | Yes | Yes* | Yes | Yes | *Delegate Producer; based on a short story from 1966 book Le Chinois du XIV^{e} |
| 2008 | Confessionsofa Ex-Doofus-ItchyFooted Mutha | Yes | Yes | Yes | No | based on his own graphic novel |

=== Music videos ===
- "Lilly Done the Zampoughi Every Time I Pulled Her Coattail"

=== Other writing credits ===
- Sweet Sweetback's Baadasssss Song: The Musical (2008) writer, singer
- Unmitigated Truth: Life, a Lavatory, Loves, and Ladies (2009) writer, performer

=== As himself ===
- Unstoppable (2005)
- How to Eat Your Watermelon in White Company (2005)

=== Other acting-only credits ===
- O.C. and Stiggs (1987) as Bob 'Wino Bob'
- Jaws: The Revenge (1987) as Mr. Witherspoon
- Taking Care of Terrific (1987) (television film) as 'Hawk'
- Sonny Spoon (1988) (television series) as Mel Spoon
- Boomerang (1992) as Editor
- Posse (1993) as Joe 'Papa Joe'
- Terminal Velocity (1994) as Noble
- Fist of the North Star (1995) as Asher
- Living Single (1996) as Warner Devant, Episodes: "Likes Father, Likes Son"
- The Shining (1997) (miniseries) as Dick Hallorann
- The Hebrew Hammer (2003) as Sweetback
- BlacKout (2007) as George
- Redemption Road (2010) as Elmo
- We the Party (2012) as 'Big D'
- Peeples (2013) as Grandpa Peebles
- Armed (2018) as Grandpa V

== Plays ==
- The Hostage (Dutch National Theatre Tour, actor, 1964)
- Don't Play Us Cheap (composer, lyricist, and musical book writer; premiere November 1970, San Francisco State College; Broadway production 1972, Ethel Barrymore Theatre)
- Ain't Supposed to Die a Natural Death (writer, 1971)
- Out There by Your Lonesome (one-man play, 1973)
- Reggae (co-librettist, 1980)
- Waltz of the Stork (actor, writer, 1982)
- Champeen (musical, writer, 1983)
- Waltz of the Stork Boogie (writer, director, 1984)
- Unmitigated Truth: Life, a Lavatory, Loves, and Ladies (musical, writer, 2009)
