= The Castro Complex =

1970 Broadway play

- Original language: English
- Written by: Mel Arrighi
- Characters: Betsy Kress; Hadley Marcus; Paco Montoya
- Genre: Comedy
- Setting: West Village, New York City

Premiere
- Date: November 18, 1970
- Place: Stairway Theatre, Manhattan, New York City

The Castro Complex is a 1970 play written by Mel Arrighi. It opened on Broadway on November 18, 1970, and closed on November 22, 1970.

== Setting ==
The show takes place at Betsy Kross' apartment in the West Village.

== Production ==
The show premiered on Broadway at the Stairway Theatre on November 18, 1970, directed by James Burrows, set design Kert Lundell, lighting design Roger Morgan, and costume design John J. Whitmore. The cast included Marian Hailey-Moss (Betsy Kress), Terry Kiser (Hadley Marcus), and Raul Julia (Paco Montoya).

== Reception ==
Mel Gussow of the New York Times wrote "played by Raul Julia, Paco provides most of what small enjoyment there is in this comedy."

Sid Smith from the Chicago Tribune wrote in a 1986 review that Castro is portrayed as being "just too slight and dimwitted".
