= Mary Alice =

American actress (1936–2022)

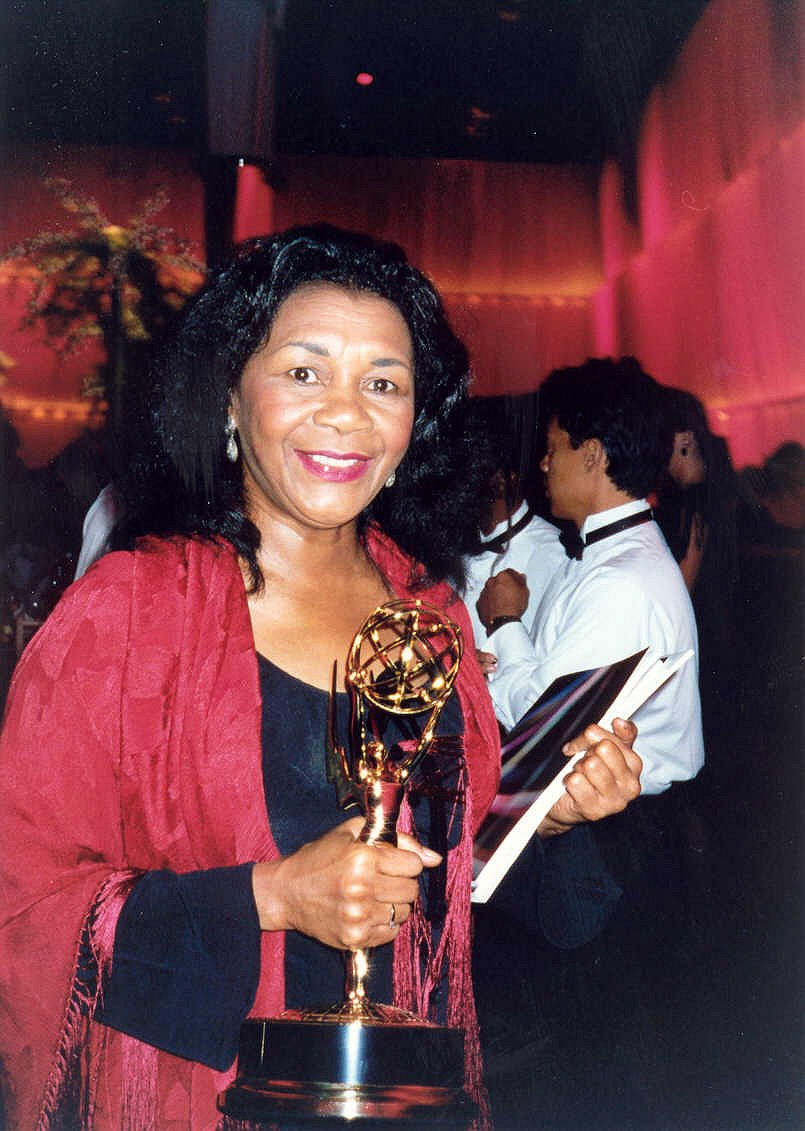
- Alice at the 45th Emmy Awards Governor's Ball, 1993
- Born: Mary Alice Smith; December 3, 1936 (Note: or December 3, 1941 (sources differ)); Indianola, Mississippi, U.S.
- Died: July 27, 2022 (aged 85); Manhattan, New York, U.S.
- Education: Chicago Teacher's College
- Occupation: Actress
- Years active: 1969–2005
- Known for: Effie Williams – Sparkle; Leticia "Lettie" Bostic – A Different World

Mary Alice Smith (December 3, 1936 – July 27, 2022), known professionally as Mary Alice, was an American television, film, and stage actress. Alice was known for her roles as Leticia "Lettie" Bostic on the sitcom A Different World (1987–1989) and Effie Williams in the 1976 musical drama Sparkle, and won an Emmy Award for Outstanding Supporting Actress for her recurring role on the series I'll Fly Away. Alice also performed on the stage, and received a Tony Award for Best Featured Actress in a Play for her appearance in the 1987 production of August Wilson's Fences.

== Early life and education ==
Born Mary Alice Smith in Indianola, Mississippi, Alice was the daughter of Ozelar (née Jurnakin/Journakin) and Sam Smith. She showed an early and natural ability for acting, and began her stage career in her hometown. Her family moved from Mississippi to Chicago when she was two years old. She graduated from Chicago Teacher's College (now known as Chicago State University), and taught at an elementary school.

== Career ==
Mary Alice returned to acting in the mid-1960s through community theater and appeared in three Douglass Turner Ward's plays, including Days of Absence and Happy Endings. Mary Alice also washed the cast's laundry for a salary of $200 a week. She did some acting in New York City during the late 1960s and early 1970s, performing in multiple productions at La MaMa Experimental Theatre Club in Manhattan's East Village between 1969 and 1973. Her first production at La MaMa was Adrienne Kennedy's A Rat's Mass in September 1969. She reprised her role as Sister Rat in the October 1969 production, and again in the January 1971 production. All three productions were directed by Seth Allen. In 1970, Mary Alice performed in Ed Bullins' Street Sounds, directed by Hugh Gittens. She later performed in Lamar Alford's Thoughts in December 1972 and January 1973.

Mary Alice made her screen début in the 1974 film The Education of Sonny Carson, and later appeared in the television shows Police Woman and Sanford and Son. She played Ellie Grant Hubbard on the soap opera All My Children during the mid-1980s, and the role of Cora in Stan Lathan's 1984 cult-classic film Beat Street, as well as co–starred in A Different World as Leticia "Lettie" Bostic from the series' start in 1987 until the end of the second season in 1989. She won an Emmy Award for Outstanding Supporting Actress in a Drama Series in 1993 for I'll Fly Away. Her other film credits include Malcolm X (1992), The Inkwell (1994), and Down in the Delta (1998).

In 2000, she was inducted into the American Theatre Hall of Fame. She replaced Gloria Foster as the Oracle in the sequel The Matrix Revolutions (2003) and the video game tie-in Enter the Matrix (2003) after Foster, who originated the role, died in 2001. Alice reprised the role one last time in The Matrix Online prior to retiring from acting in 2005.

== Personal life and death ==
Alice died on July 27, 2022, at her residence in Manhattan at the age of 85, due to natural causes.

== Filmography ==
=== Film ===
Year	Title	Role	Notes
1974	The Education of Sonny Carson	Moms	
1975	Requiem for a Nun	Nancy Mannigoe	
1976	Sparkle	Effie Williams	
1981	The Color of Friendship	Mrs. Garth	
1984	Beat Street	Cora Kirkland	
1984	Concealed Enemies	Edith Murray	
1984	Teachers	Linda Ganz	
1990	To Sleep with Anger	Suzie	Nominated — Independent Spirit Award for Best Female Lead
1990	The Bonfire of the Vanities	Annie Lamb	
1990	Awakenings	Nurse Margaret	
1992	Malcolm X	School Teacher	
1993	A Perfect World	Dottie	
1993	Life with Mikey	Mrs. Gordon	
1994	The Inkwell	Evelyn	
1996	Bed of Roses	Alice	
1998	Down in the Delta	Rosa Lynn Sinclair	
1999	Catfish in Black Bean Sauce	Dolores Williams	
1999	The Wishing Tree	Mattie Collier	
2000	The Photographer	Violet	
2002	Sunshine State	Mrs. Eunice Stokes	
2003	The Matrix Revolutions	The Oracle	Nominated — Black Reel Award for Outstanding Supporting Actress

=== Television ===
Year	Title	Role	Notes
1974	The Sty of the Blind Pig	Alberta Warren	Television Film
1975	Police Woman	Marnie	1 episode
1975	Sanford and Son	Frances Victor	2 episodes
1975	Good Times	Loretta Simpson	1 episode
1975	The Family Holvak	Samantha Wilson	1 episode
1976	Insight	Karen Fuller	1 episode
1976	Just an Old Sweet Song	Helen Mayfield	Television movie
1976	Serpico	Angel	1 episode
1976	Visions	Evelyn Burrell	1 episode
1979	Lawman Without a Gun	Minnie Hayward	Television film
1980	All My Children	Ellie Grant Hubbard	unknown episode(s)
1987–1989	A Different World	Leticia "Lettie" Bostic	Main role, 25 episodes
1989	The Women of Brewster Place	Fannie Michael	2 episodes
1990	L.A. Law	Maxine Manley	1 episode
1992	I'll Fly Away	Marguerite Peck	Recurring role, 7 episodes Primetime Emmy Award for Outstanding Supporting Actress in a Drama Series
1993	Laurel Avenue	Maggie Arnett	Television film Nominated — CableACE Award for Best Actress in a Movie or Miniseries
1993	Law & Order	Virginia Bryan	1 episode
1994	Great Performances		1 episode
1997	Orleans	Ella Clark	1 episode
1999	Cosby	Loretta	4 episodes
2000	Touched by an Angel	Georgia Bishop	1 episode
2000	Providence	Abby Franklin	1 episode
2001	Soul Food	Mrs. Pettaway	1 episode
2002	Oz	Eugenia Hill	1 episode
2004	Line of Fire	Jackie Simon	1 episode
2004	The Jury	Elaine Nebatoff	1 episode
2005	Kojak	Joyce	1 episode

=== Theatre ===
Year	Title	Role	Notes
1969–1971	No Place to Be Somebody	Cora Beasley	
1981	A Full-Length Portrait of America	Emma	
1987–1988	Fences	Rose	Drama Desk Award for Outstanding Featured Actress in a Play; Tony Award for Best Featured Actress in a Play
1994–1995	The Shadow Box	Maggie	
1995	Having Our Say	Dr. Bessie Delaney	Nominated — Drama Desk Award for Outstanding Actress in a Play; Nominated — Tony Award for Best Actress in a Play

=== Video games ===
Year	Title	Role	Notes
2003	Enter the Matrix	The Oracle	
2005	The Matrix Online	The Oracle	

== Awards and nominations ==
Year	Award	Category	Nominated work	Result
1987	Tony Awards	Tony Award for Best Featured Actress in a Play	Fences	Won
1987	Drama Desk Award	Drama Desk Award for Outstanding Featured Actress in a Play	Fences	Won
1990	Independent Spirit Awards	Independent Spirit Award for Best Female Lead	To Sleep with Anger	Nominated
1992	Emmy Awards	Primetime Emmy Award for Outstanding Supporting Actress in a Drama Series	I'll Fly Away	Nominated
1993	Emmy Awards	Outstanding Supporting Actress in a Drama Series	I'll Fly Away	Won
1994	CableACE Award	Best Actress in a Movie or Miniseries	Laurel Avenue	Nominated
1995	Tony Awards	Tony Award for Best Actress in a Play	Having Our Say	Nominated
1995	Drama Desk Awards	Drama Desk Award for Outstanding Actress in a Play	Having Our Say	Nominated
2004	Black Reel Awards	Black Reel Award for Outstanding Supporting Actress	The Matrix Revolutions	Nominated
