= La Permission =

1967 novel by Melvin Van Peebles

La Permission is a 1967 French-language novel written by Melvin Van Peebles. Van Peebles adapted his book into the film The Story of a Three-Day Pass (1967).

== History ==
Melvin Van Peebles began directing short films in the 1950s. After struggling to establish himself in Hollywood, however, he relocated to Amsterdam to pursue a doctorate in astronomy at the University of Amsterdam and to study acting at the Dutch National Theater. Following an invitation from the Cinémathèque française, which had gained access to his short films, Van Peebles moved to France.

Upon his arrival Van Peebles discovered that French writers could join the directors' guild by adapting their own written works. Having taught himself the language, he published several books, including La Permission. The novel tells the story of the bittersweet romance between a white Frenchwoman and an African-American soldier visiting Paris on furlough. After winning a filmmaking subsidy, he adapted La Permission into The Story of a Three-Day Pass. It was his first feature film.
