= Mary Meerson =

French ballet dancer and model

Mary Meerson, née Marija Popowa, also known as Madame Langlois (12 November 1902, Sofia – 19 July 1993, Paris), was a French ballet dancer, model and archivist of the Cinémathèque Française. She was a companion and associate of Henri Langlois, the founder and director of the Cinémathèque Française.

Mary Meerson

== Life ==
Marija Popowa was born on 12 November 1902 in Sofia, Bulgaria. She left her country traveling through central Europe and joined the Ballets Russes of Diaghilev in Monte Carlo and then in Paris. Along with her friend Kiki, the muse of the Montparnasse, Popowa was painted by the best known artists. In the late 1920s, she was a model for Giorgio de Chirico and Reisling. In 1931, she posed as a model for the paintings of Oskar Kokoschka. In the 1930s, Popowa was connected to the Parisian artistic milieu and was acquainted with Pablo Picasso, Georges Braque and Fernand Léger.

She made a sensational entry into the world of cinema through her meeting with Lazare Meerson, Russian constructivist painter, architect, whose ideas revolutionized the design of cinema sets. Popowa married Lazare Meerson. She accompanied him to London where he suddenly died in 1938. After his death, Mary Meerson met Henri Langlois, the founder of the Cinémathèque Française, and became his companion and closest collaborator.

Meerson is known for short documentary Retour d'Henri Langlois à Paris (1968). She owned paintings of Picasso, Braque and Léger and sold them throughout her life to finance the Cinémathèque Française. Meerson remained Langlois’ partner until his death in 1977. After Langlois' death, Meerson continued his mission and considered that, Musée du Cinéma not only should become legal but also sponsored by the government. She called herself "Madame Langlois".

In 1982, her initiative resulted in the creation of the Cinémathèque de la Danse as a part of the Cinémathèque Française. Meerson spoke Russian, Bulgarian, French, English, Italian, German, Yiddish, Mandarin Chinese, and Sanskrit.

Mary Meerson died on 19 July 1993 in Paris, aged 90.
