= How to Eat Your Watermelon in White Company (and Enjoy It) =

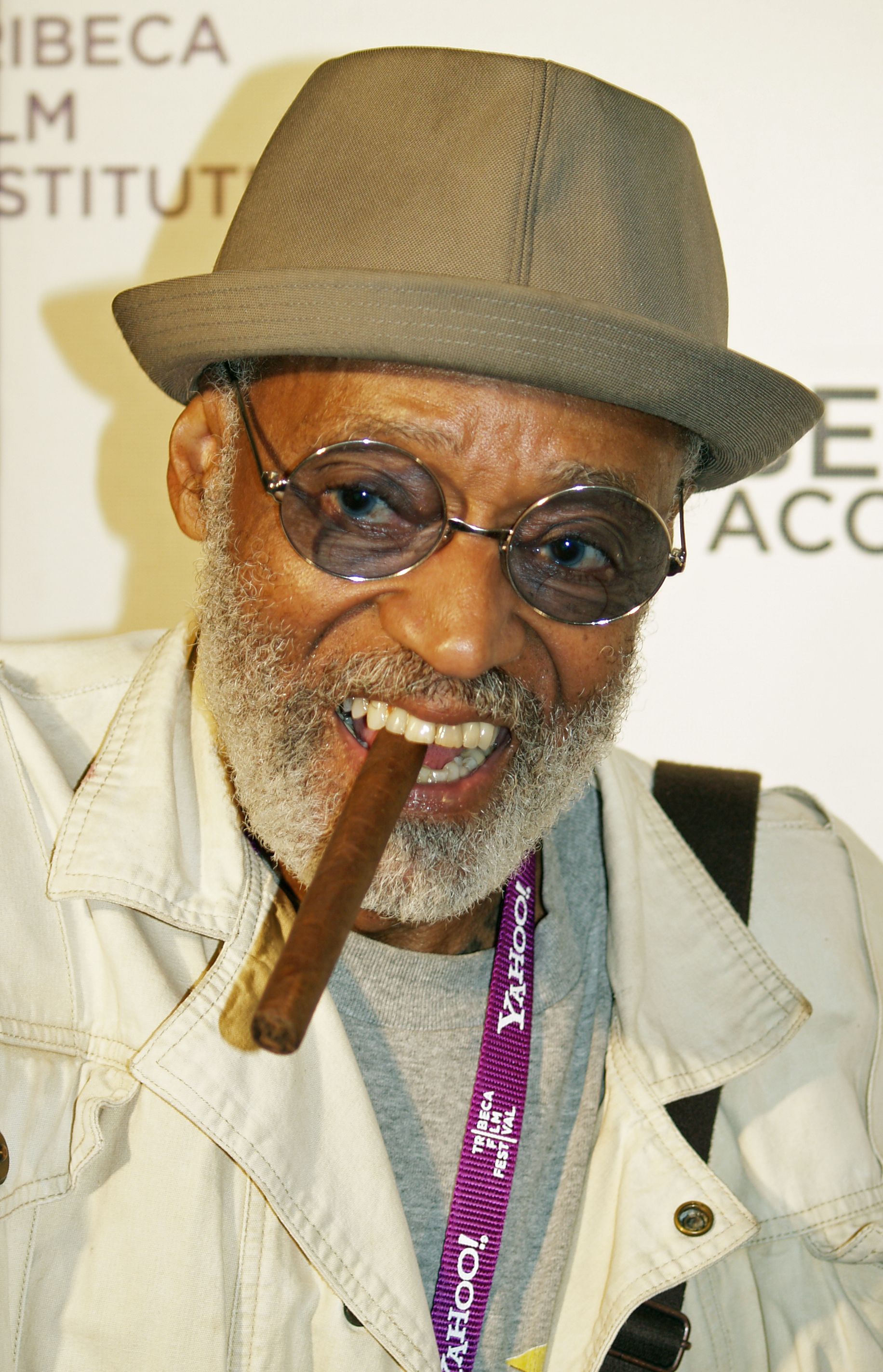
Subject of the film, Melvin Van Peebles

How to Eat Your Watermelon in White Company (and Enjoy It), is a 2005 documentary film directed and written by Joe Angio, and produced by Michael Solomon. The film follows Melvin Van Peebles through his illustrious musical, acting, and directing career. The name comes from a controversial article that Van Peebles wrote, but never got published. Joe Angio, the director received four nominations for his film. Three of these nominations were for best documentary at the Chicago International film festival, and one nomination was at the Los Angeles Film Festival for best documentary feature.

== Synopsis ==
The film opens with content on where Van Peebles was born and raised, and eventually ends with discussing the many things he has done as a director, actor, singer, and even stock trader throughout his life. After his early years growing up in Chicago, the film goes on to show his experience being a cable car driver, and even an Air force pilot. It documents how he felt while he was working on the cable cars and how he ultimately wrote a novel about these days called The Big Heart. This book ultimately catapults Van Peebles into the independent film industry where he began making short films with the hopes of breaking into Hollywood. The documentary eventually touches upon when Van Peebles took flight and landed in the Netherlands and then eventually France in order to pursue his filmmaking career.

== Production ==
The film was directed and written by Joe Angio and produced by Joe's good friend Michael Solomon. Surprised that no one of the caliber of Spike Lee or St. Clair Bourne had made a film about Van Peebles yet, the production of the film started in early 1998 and didn’t finish until 2005. Angio was once asked what type of guy Van Peebles was in an interview with Evan Jacobs; "After being around him for all that time, what have you taken away about him personally?" He stated in his response that Van Peebles is probably one of the hardest working men he has ever met. In order for him to have the influence that he has, he had to be. Anglo states, "Whenever I feel like being lazy and procrastinating I think of the ten things Melvin has probably already accomplished while I was laying in bed."

== Reception ==
According to A. O. Scott of the New York Times, How to Eat Your Watermelon in White Company (and Enjoy It) documents "American racism and one man's crafty, angry and resourceful responses to it." Throughout Van Peebles' career, he received quite a bit of flak because of the controversial movies that he produced. For example, Sweet Sweetback's Baadasssss Song received an x-rating by the Motion Picture Association of America. Van Peebles' response to this was to market the film as "rated X by an all white jury." He stated in the documentary that after this response, the association reached out to him and told him that he wasn’t able to do that. His response was "you’re all white right, so what's the problem?" The film has received a 92% on Rotten Tomatoes, with 11 fresh ratings, and only one rotten. Bill Cosby, a long time friend and supporter of Van Peebles was mentioned in the film to have donated the $50,000 he needed in order to produce Sweet Sweetback's Baadasssss Song.

== Re-release in 2015 ==
On February 2, 2015, in order to honor the 45th anniversary of Van Peebles' critically acclaimed film Sweet Sweetback's Baadasssss Song, the documentary was revamped, re-released and distributed by Music Box Films Home Entertainment, with add ons in a complete DVD set. The complete set includes new bonus features, including a new interview with Van Peebles, three of Van Peebles' news commentaries, and two live concert performances.
