= The Story of a Three-Day Pass =

- Directed by: Melvin Van Peebles
- Screenplay by: Melvin Van Peebles
- Based on: La Permission by Melvin Van Peebles
- Produced by: Guy Belfond
- Starring: Harry Baird; Nicole Berger
- Cinematography: Michel Kelber
- Edited by: Liliane Korb
- Music by: Melvin Van Peebles
- Distributed by: Sigma III Corp.
- Release dates: 27 October 1967 (SFIFF); 8 July 1968
- Running time: 87 minutes
- Country: France
- Languages: English; French

The Story of a Three-Day Pass (French title: La Permission) is a 1967 film written and directed by Melvin Van Peebles, based on his French-language novel La Permission. It stars Harry Baird as a Black American soldier who is demoted for fraternizing with a white shop clerk (Nicole Berger) in France.

Along with writing and directing the film, Van Peebles collaborated on its score with Mickey Baker and sings one of the two songs written for the film, "When My Number Gonna Hit". The other song, "Hard Times", is a duet; one of the singers is Mickey Baker. The film premiered in 1967 at the San Francisco International Film Festival. In 2020, the film was one of the selections of the Cannes Classics section at the Cannes Film Festival.

== Plot ==
Turner, a Black United States Army G.I. stationed in France, is promoted to Assistant Orderly by his captain. Since his appointment starts on Monday, Turner is given a three-day pass. As Turner gets ready to leave, his reflection in the mirror accuses him of being an Uncle Tom. Turner travels throughout Paris, where he wanders mostly aimlessly for the first day.

One night, Turner finds himself in a nightclub, where he meets a white French shop clerk named Miriam. The two dance and converse for several hours, and plan a trip to the beaches of Normandy in Etretat. She leaves, while Turner stays and dances. The next day, Turner drives Miriam to Normandy. During the drive there, Miriam talks about her working hours as a clerk, and her previous job as a night school teacher. One night, as she was sick, she failed to pass her school teacher certifying exam, which makes her available on Saturdays as a clerck.

The pair arrive at a motel, where Miriam request a single bedroom. The two enjoy their romance but also struggle with the complexities of racism. While passionately kissing Turner, Miriam imagines herself alone in a forest where she is captured by tribal Africans and sacrificed. Images of white protestors holding dehumanizing posters are juxtaposed, while Miriam and Turner sleep together. Turner plays football with young French boys, and later that night, they share drinks at a nightclub. A Spanish man insults Turner by calling him "Mr. Blackie" (which translates to "negrito"). Offended at the perceived racial slur, Turner fights the man and leaves. Nearby a bridge, Miriam consoles him.

On his last day, Turner's comrades arrive on the beach, where they meet Miriam. They report his interracial relationship to Turner's captain. He is demoted to the barracks. After some visiting African-American women convince his commander to lift the restriction, Turner is told Miriam is sick when he telephones her and he resigns himself to giving up on their romantic relationship.

== Cast ==
- Harry Baird as Turner
- Nicole Berger as Miriam
- Hal Brav as Turner's Captain

== Production ==
The film was shot over a period of six weeks at a cost of $200,000.

== Reception ==
In 2020, The New Yorker critic Richard Brody described The Story of a Three-Day Pass as being "among the great American films of the sixties."
