= Unstoppable: Conversation with Melvin Van Peebles, Gordon Parks, and Ossie Davis =

2005 television film

Unstoppable: Conversation with Melvin Van Peebles, Gordon Parks, and Ossie Davis is a film (Note: Multiple sources:) in which Melvin Van Peebles, Gordon Parks, and Ossie Davis are interviewed together, with moderation by Warrington Hudlin. It also features Ruby Dee and Nelson George.

It was first shown on the STARZ network.

In 2005, it was nominated for a Peabody Award.
