= Bellyful =

- Poster.
- Directed by: Melvin Van Peebles
- Written by: Melvin Van Peebles
- Produced by: Jean-Pierre Saire, Yves Pasquier; assistant: Ron van Eeden, F. Jansen, Emmanuel Paulin, Stéphane Rollot, Eric Stanley
- Starring: Andréa Ferréol; Jacques Boudet
- Cinematography: Philippe Pavans de Ceccatty
- Edited by: Catherine D'Hoir
- Music by: Melvin Van Peebles
- Distributed by: Euripide Distribution
- Release date: June 28, 2000
- Running time: 105 minutes
- Countries: United States; France
- Languages: French; English

Le Conte du ventre plein (international English title: Bellyful or A Belly Full) is a 2000 film written and directed by Melvin Van Peebles.

== Plot ==
A conservative couple masquerade as liberal do-gooders in late 60's France. With orders piling up at their bistro, The Full Belly, Loretta and Henri, self-described "pillars of the community," hire Diamantine as a waitress in order to give a poor black orphan a chance at a better life. At home, they tell their trusting, new live-in employee that she's "one of the family," yet in town they encourage widespread disapproval of her. When they convince her to carry an extended joke to full term - pretending she's pregnant - Diamantine, and a slightly shady friend of the couple, Jan, become entangled in an elaborate charade.

== Cast ==
- Andréa Ferréol as Loretta
- Jacques Boudet as Henri
- Meiji U Tum'si as Diamantine
- Claude Perron as Blanchette
- Herman van Veen as Jan
