= Confessionsofa Ex-Doofus-ItchyFooted Mutha =

- Directed by: Melvin Van Peebles
- Written by: Melvin Van Peebles
- Produced by: Melvin Van Peebles
- Starring: Melvin Van Peebles
- Cinematography: Giles Francis; John Threat
- Edited by: Melvin Van Peebles
- Release date: 2008
- Running time: 99 minutes
- Country: United States
- Language: English
- Box office: $1,717

ConfessionsOfa Ex-Doofus-ItchyFooted Mutha is a 2008 film by Melvin Van Peebles. It is based on Van Peebles' 1982 Broadway musical Waltz of the Stork and his graphic novel of the same name. The film was screened at the Tribeca Film Festival in April 2008 and was the Closing Night feature in the Maryland Film Festival in May 2008. Van Peebles plays the film's main character from boyhood to age 47.

== Plot summary ==
A boy (Melvin Van Peebles) travels from Chicago to New York to find adventure and riches, later crossing the ocean to Africa in order to reunite with his lover.

== Production ==
Van Peebles was a part of the Merchant Marine as a child and used his memories of people back then to write a graphic novel. Though he originally intended to write a novel, he chose the former genre because it was a new concept at the time. In a later version of his graphic novel, Van Peebles included stills that he had not included in the film. The film is also partly based on Van Peeble's 1982 play Waltz of the Stork. Its soundtrack contains mostly music composed by Van Peebles in a variety of genres. This is his most personal film since Sweet Sweetback's Baad Asssss Song was released in 1971. It contains song lyrics, poetic verses, and wordplay.

Van Peebles, who was 75 years old at the time of the filming, plays the role of himself from age 10 to 47. His mother is 40 years younger than him, and his lover is old enough to be his grandchild. His son Mario Van Peebles makes a cameo appearance as a pirate. The title comes from the character becoming an "ex doofus" as he gets older.

== Reception ==
Mike Hale of The New York Times wrote, "Ex-Doofus is a better film in every technical sense – people who had trouble sitting through Sweetback are likely to find Ex-Doofus tolerable and even pleasantly diverting – but a lesser one when it matters".

J. R. Jones of The Chicago Reader gave a positive review, stating, "The video has a funky, loose-limbed feel, but Van Peebles has been celebrated so much already you have to wonder how many victory laps a man needs."

Kevin Thomas, writing for the Los Angeles Times gave a mixed review stating, "Van Peebles' persona and sensibility remain engaging, as do his way with his beguiling score and songs, but his film desperately needs tightening to eliminate tedious moments, especially in the African sequence."
