= Just an Old Sweet Song =

1976 novel by Melvin Van Peebles

- Author: Melvin Van Peebles
- Language: English
- Publication date: 1976

Just an Old Sweet Song is a 1976 novel by Melvin Van Peebles. It was later adapted as a made-for-television film which starred Robert Hooks and Cicely Tyson. It is about a family from the North of America spending a vacation in the South and learning about the difference in the families in both places.
