= Waltz of the Stork =

1982 American semi-autobiographical play by Melvin Van Peebles

Waltz of the Stork is a 1982 American semi-autobiographical play written and originally performed by Melvin Van Peebles.

It also featured his son Mario Van Peebles. The play originally ran for four months in 1982. It ran from January 5, 1982, to May 23, 1982.

The song "The Apple Stretching", featured in this play, was later covered by Grace Jones, and released as a single. In 2008, a film based on the play, Confessionsofa Ex-Doofus-ItchyFooted Mutha, was released, directed by Van Peebles.

== Cast ==
- Melvin Van Peebles – Edward Aloysius Younger
- Bob Carten – Stillman
- C.J.Critt – Phantoms, etc.
- Mario Van Peebles – Phantoms, etc.

== Songs ==
- "There"
- "And I Love You"
- "The Apple Stretching"
- "Tender Understanding" (written by Teddy Hayes)
- "The Apple Stretching"
- "My Love Belongs to You"
- "Weddings and Funerals" (written by Mark Barkan)
- "On 115"
- "Play It as It Lays"
- "Shoulders Tpto Lean On"
