= Ernest Lindgren =

British film archivist (1910–1973)

- Born: 3 October 1910
- Died: 22 July 1973 (aged 62)
- Occupations: Film archivist, writer
- Organization: British Film Institute

Ernest Lindgren (3 October 1910 – 22 July 1973) was a British film archivist and writer.

== Career ==
Lindgren joined the British Film Institute in February 1934 as Information Officer, and became the first curator of the National Film Library in 1935, renamed the National Film Archive in 1955. He remained curator until his death in 1973. He was succeeded by David Francis.

Lindgren's approach to the preservation of film materials is often contrasted with that of Henri Langlois, the founder of the Cinémathèque Française; the scientific against the romantic. Unlike Langlois, Lindgren adopted a selective approach in opposition to accumulating every possible film. Along with Langlois though, Lindgren played a major role in the development of FIAF, the International Federation of Film Archives. It is argued that the NFA gained a reputation for being uncooperative in this period, and Lindgren reportedly applied the Alizarin Red test (a disputed means of checking for the extent of nitrate decomposition) to films which were on loan from other institutions. Langlois in contrast had an eccentric, or non-existent, approach to record keeping, and the Cinémathèque suffered a nitrate fire on 10 July 1959.

Lindgren's approach, on the other hand, meant that no account of changes in fashion could be made. When the BFI published Missing Believed Lost (1992), and launched an accompanying campaign, it was forced to admit that some of the featured titles, all made during the nitrate era, had previously been rejected as possible acquisitions.

The Art of the Film: An Introduction to Film Appreciation, first published in 1948, went through several editions during Lindgren's lifetime. A Picture History of the Cinema appeared in 1960.

== Notes ==
=== Further reading ===
- David Robinson "Ernest Lindgren, 1910-1973", Sight and Sound, Autumn 1973
- "Mr Ernest Lindgren", The Times, 24 July 1973
- David Francis "From Parchment to Pictures to Pixels, Balancing the Accounts: Ernest Lindgren and the National Film Archive, 70 Years On", Journal of Film Preservation no 71, July 2006
- Christophe Dupin 2006. "The Origins and Early Development of the National Film Library: 1929-1936", Journal of Media Practice. vol. 7 no 3
