= Henri Langlois =

French film archivist (1914–1977)

- Born: 13 November 1914; İzmir, Ottoman Empire (now Turkey)
- Died: 13 January 1977 (aged 62); Paris, France
- Occupations: Co-founder and director of the Cinémathèque Française
- Known for: Film preservation, film archiving, film history, cinephilia
- Partner: Mary Meerson

Henri Langlois (French pronunciation: [ɑ̃ʁi lɑ̃glwa]; 13 November 1914 – 13 January 1977) was a French film archivist and cinephile. A pioneer of film preservation, Langlois was an influential figure in the history of cinema. His film screenings in Paris in the 1950s are often credited with providing the ideas that led to the development of the auteur theory.

Langlois was co-founder of the Cinémathèque Française with Georges Franju and Jean Mitry and also co-founder of the International Federation of Film Archives (FIAF) in 1938. Through close collaboration with the Cinémathèque's longtime chief archivist, Lotte Eisner, he worked to preserve films and film history in the post-war era. An eccentric who was often at the centre of controversy for his methods, he also served as a key influence on the generation of young cinephiles and critics who would become the French New Wave.

In 1974, Langlois received an Academy Honorary Award for "his devotion to the art of film, his massive contributions in preserving its past and his unswerving faith in its future".

== Career at the Cinémathèque Française ==
In 1936, Langlois, Franju and Mitry founded the Cinémathèque Française in Paris, their film theatre and museum. The collection grew from ten films in 1936 to more than 60,000 films by the early 1970s. More than an archivist, Langlois saved many films which were at risk of vanishing. Besides films, Langlois also helped to preserve other items related to cinema such as cameras, projection equipment, costumes, and vintage theatre programmes. He eventually collected so many items that he donated them in 1972 to the Musée du Cinéma in the Palais de Chaillot, where they covered a two-mile span of film artifacts and memorabilia. The collection was relocated due to damage from a fire in 1997.

During the Second World War, Langlois and his colleagues helped to save many films that were at risk of being destroyed during the Nazi occupation of France.

Langlois influenced the French New Wave directors François Truffaut, Jean-Luc Godard, Jacques Rivette, Claude Chabrol and Alain Resnais among others, and the generation of filmmakers that followed. Some of these filmmakers were called les enfants de la cinémathèque ("children of the cinémathèque"), as they could often be found in the front row of packed screenings.

Langlois' romantic attitude to film was in contrast to the scientific approach utilised by Ernest Lindgren at Britain's National Film Archive. Langlois' methods were unconventional. He was accused of having no rational approach to record keeping. The Cinémathèque lost a portion of its collection to a nitrate film fire on 10 July 1959. Sources are in conflict as to the cause and the extent of the loss.

In September 1959, a rift developed between the Fédération Internationale des Archives du Film (FIAF) and the Cinémathèque. Langlois had been involved in the founding of FIAF. The dispute between the two bodies was resolved only some years after Langlois had died.

=== Removal and reinstatement ===
In 1968, French culture minister André Malraux tried to fire Langlois due to the latter's arrogance and iron-fisted rule of the museum. On 7 February, officially due to Langlois' mismanagement and inadequate housing of archived filmstock, the state-supported Cinémathèque board replaced Langlois with Pierre Barbin. Local and international uproar ensued, and even the prestigious Cannes Film Festival was halted in protest that year. Protesters in Paris included the student activist Daniel Cohn-Bendit from University of Nanterre-Paris. Support came in telegrams from renowned directors, from Alfred Hitchcock to Akira Kurosawa to Federico Fellini to Gianni Serra. Malraux eventually reinstated Langlois after intense debate on 22 April, while reducing museum funding. The affaire Langlois was in retrospect seen as a prelude to the larger May 68 protests. Truffaut dedicated his 1968 film Stolen Kisses to Langlois, and it opens with a shot of the shuttered and locked Cinémathèque. That same year, Langlois was invited to teach cinema as visiting professor at Sir George Williams University in Montreal.

== Later life ==
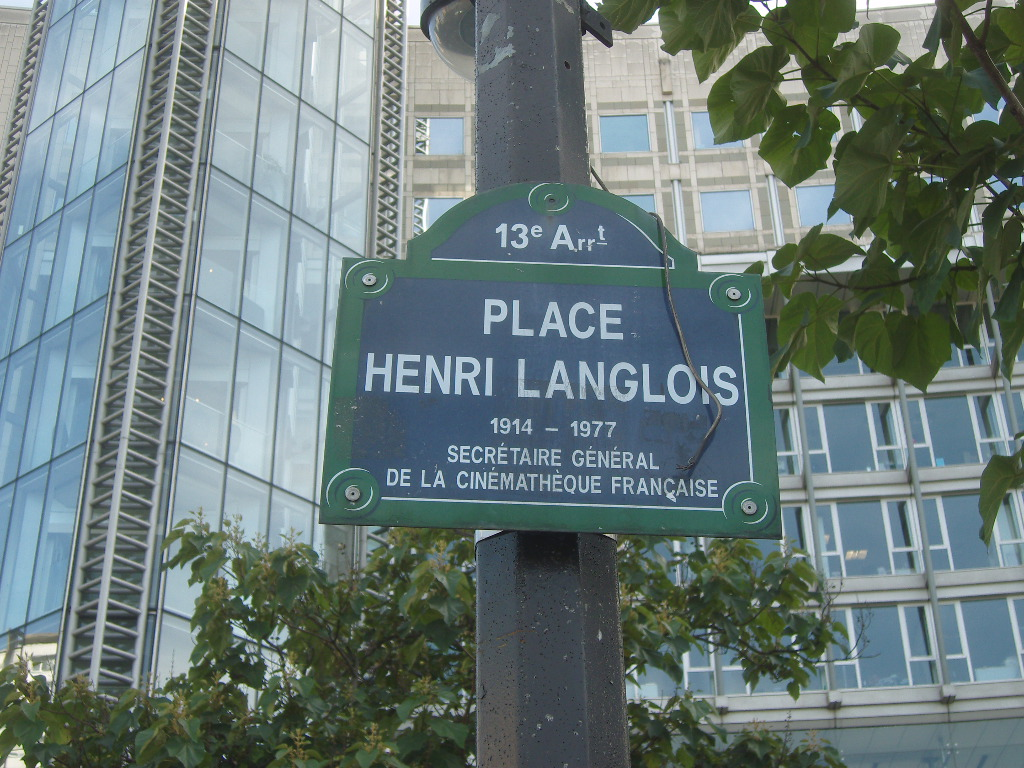
Place Henri Langlois in the 13th arrondissement in Paris is named in his honour

In 1970, Langlois selected seventy films from the Cinémathèque's collection for inclusion in "Cinémathèque at the Metropolitan Museum," an exhibition in celebration of the Centennial of the Metropolitan Museum of Art. The exhibition, co-sponsored by the Metropolitan Museum and the City Center of Music and Drama in New York, showed seventy films dating from the medium's first seventy-five years on thirty-five consecutive evenings from July 29 to September 3, 1970. Langlois selected films for their significance and contributions to the history of filmmaking, including work from official film industries as well as current and early avant garde directors. The program was the most diverse film exhibition held in the United States to date, and was the museum's first major undertaking in film.

In 1974, Langlois received an Academy Honorary Award for his lifetime work with the Cinémathèque. He died three years later and is interred in the Cimetière du Montparnasse in Paris.

Place Henri Langlois in the 13th arrondissement in Paris is named in his honour.

== Documentaries about Langlois ==
In 1970, an English-language documentary Henri Langlois was made about his life's work, featuring interviews with Ingrid Bergman, Lillian Gish, François Truffaut, Catherine Deneuve, Jeanne Moreau and others. The film was produced and directed by Roberto Guerra and Eila Hershon.

Edgardo Cozarinsky's 1994 documentary Citizen Langlois is an essayistic biography showing Langlois' progress from amateur collector to nouvelle vague hero and friend of the stars.

Bernardo Bertolucci's 2003 film The Dreamers addresses the firing of Langlois and includes period footage of the events.

In 2004, Jacques Richard directed a documentary on Langlois's career, The Phantom of the Cinémathèque. It features interviews with friends, colleagues, academics, and such movie luminaries as Simone Signoret, Godard, Chabrol, Truffaut and Jean-Michel Arnold.

In 2014, the Cinémathèque released a short documentary titled Henri Langlois vu par..., in which thirteen filmmakers, including Agnès Varda, Francis Ford Coppola, Roman Polanski, Manoel de Oliveira, Bernardo Bertolucci, Kiyoshi Kurosawa and Wim Wenders talk about Langlois and their relationship with him.

== See also ==
- Musée du Cinema – Henri Langlois (no longer in existence)
- Lotte Eisner
- Kashiko Kawakita
