= Musée de la Cinémathèque =

Museum of cinema history in Paris, France

Coordinates: 48°51′47″N 2°17′22″E

The Musée de la cinémathèque (French pronunciation: [myze də la sinematɛk], Cinema Museum), formerly known as Musée du cinéma Henri-Langlois ([myze dy sinema ɑ̃ʁi lɑ̃ɡlwa], Henri Langlois Cinema Museum), is a museum of cinema history located in the Cinémathèque française, 51 rue de Bercy in the 12th arrondissement of Paris. It presents the living history of moving pictures and pre-cinema, from their origins to the present day and in all countries, with collections of more than 5,000 movie-related objects including cameras, movie scripts and sets, photographic stills, costumes worn by actors like Rudolph Valentino and Marilyn Monroe, and showed several early movies from the important collection of the Cinémathèque.

== History ==
The museum was created as "Musée du cinéma Henri-Langlois" in 1972 by Henri Langlois (1914–1977), a cinema enthusiast who also founded the Cinémathèque française. The museum was located in Paris in the Palais de Chaillot, 1 place du Trocadéro.

The Musée du cinéma Henri-Langlois was evacuated when the roof of the neighbor building, the Museum of French monuments sculpture, was damaged by fire in 1997. The museum was then subject to an unusual court case when the Cinémathèque française attempted to store the collection for safety reasons, in which it was successfully argued that the museum was "unquestionably the creative work of one man and therefore protected under the law" and hence could not be disbanded. This decision was handed down several months after the 1997 fire.

In 2005, the Musée du Cinéma – Henri Langlois and the Cinémathèque française were relocated in the former American Center in Paris, built by Frank Gehry in the Parc de Bercy, and merged in 2007 with the Bibliothèque du film (BiFi). In addition to cycles dedicated to directors and cinemas of the world, the Cinémathèque presents temporary exhibitions, inaugurated in 2005, with "Renoir/Renoir".

== See also ==
- Cinémathèque Française
- List of museums in Paris
