= Sidney Poitier filmography =

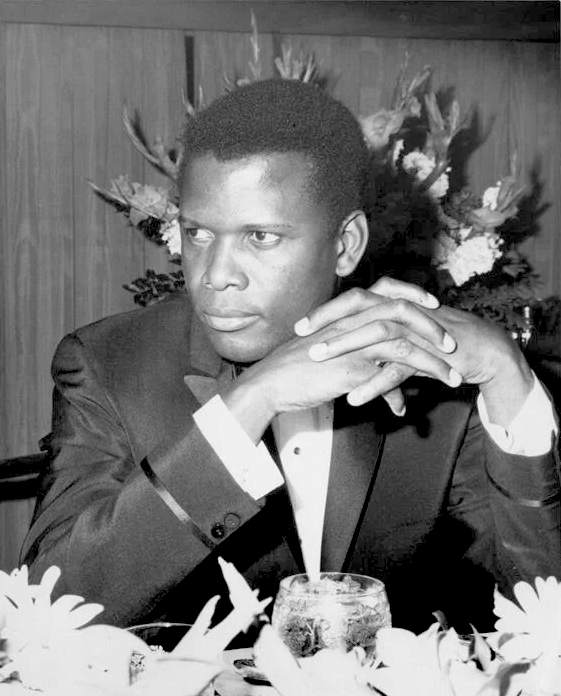
Poitier in 1964

Sidney Poitier (1927–2022) was an actor and director. He was best known for his groundbreaking and trailblazing work in the 1950s and 1960s. His breakthrough performances in film include The Defiant Ones (1958), Porgy and Bess (1959), A Raisin in the Sun (1961), Paris Blues (1961), Lilies of the Field (1963), A Patch of Blue (1965), To Sir, with Love, In the Heat of the Night and Guess Who's Coming to Dinner (all 1967).

== Filmography ==
=== Film ===
==== As actor ====
Year	Title	Role	Notes	Ref.
1947	Sepia Cinderella	Extra	Uncredited	
1950	No Way Out	Dr. Luther Brooks		
1951	Cry, the Beloved Country	Reverend Msimangu		
1952	Red Ball Express	Corporal Andrew Robertson		
1954	Go Man Go	Inman Jackson		
1955	Blackboard Jungle	Gregory W. Miller		
1956	Good-bye, My Lady	Gates Watson		
1957	Edge of the City	Tommy Tyler		
1957	Something of Value	Kimani		
1957	Band of Angels	Rau-Ru		
1957	The Mark of the Hawk	Obam		
1958	Virgin Island	Marcus		
1958	The Defiant Ones	Noah Cullen		
1959	Porgy and Bess	Porgy		
1960	All the Young Men	Sergeant Eddie Towler		
1961	A Raisin in the Sun	Walter Lee Younger		
1961	Paris Blues	Eddie Cook		
1962	Pressure Point	Doctor		
1963	The Long Ships	Ali Mansuh		
1963	Lilies of the Field	Homer Smith		
1965	The Bedford Incident	Ben Munceford		
1965	The Greatest Story Ever Told	Simon of Cyrene		
1965	A Patch of Blue	Gordon Ralfe		
1965	The Slender Thread	Alan Newell		
1966	Duel at Diablo	Toller		
1967	To Sir, with Love	Mark Thackeray		
1967	In the Heat of the Night	Detective Virgil Tibbs		
1967	Guess Who's Coming to Dinner	Dr. John Wade Prentice		
1968	For Love of Ivy	Jack Parks		
1969	The Lost Man	Jason Higgs		
1970	They Call Me Mister Tibbs!	Virgil Tibbs		
1971	Brother John	John Kane		
1971	The Organization	Virgil Tibbs		
1972	Buck and the Preacher	Buck	Also director	
1973	A Warm December	Matt Younger	Also director	
1974	Uptown Saturday Night	Steve Jackson	Also director	
1975	The Wilby Conspiracy	Shack Twala		
1975	Let's Do It Again	Clyde Williams	Also director	
1977	A Piece of the Action	Manny Durrell	Also director	
1979	Paul Robeson: Tribute to an Artist	The Narrator	Short subject	
1988	Shoot to Kill	FBI Agent Warren Stantin		
1988	Little Nikita	Roy Parmenter		
1992	Sneakers	Donald Crease		
1997	The Jackal	FBI Deputy Director Carter Preston		

==== Documentary appearances ====
- From Whence Cometh My Help (1949)
- Pepperbird Land (1952) (Narrator)
- King: A Filmed Record... Montgomery to Memphis (1970) (Narrator)
- A Century of Cinema (1994)
- Wild Bill: Hollywood Maverick (1996)
- Ralph Bunche: An American Odyssey (2001) (Narrator)
- Tell Them Who You Are (2004)
- Mr. Warmth: The Don Rickles Project (2008)
- Sidney (2022)

==== As director ====
- Buck and the Preacher (1972) (Also uncredited as producer)
- A Warm December (1973)
- Uptown Saturday Night (1974)
- Let's Do It Again (1975)
- A Piece of the Action (1977)
- Stir Crazy (1980)
- Hanky Panky (1982)
- Fast Forward (1985)
- Ghost Dad (1990)

=== Television ===
==== As performer ====
Year	Title	Role	Notes	Ref.
1952	CBS Television Workshop		Episode: "Careless Love"	
1952	Pulitzer Prize Playhouse		Episode: "The Fascinating Stranger"	
1952	Omnibus		Episode: "The Trial of Anne Boleyn"	
1952–1955	The Philco Television Playhouse	Tommy Tyler	2 episodes	
1955	Kraft Television Theatre		Episode: "The Fascinating Stranger"	
1991	Separate but Equal	Thurgood Marshall	Television film	
1995	Children of the Dust	Gypsy Smith	2 episodes	
1996	To Sir, with Love II	Mark Thackeray	Television film	
1997	Mandela and de Klerk	Nelson Mandela	Television film	
1998	Free of Eden	Will Cleamons	Television film	
1998	David and Lisa	Dr. Jack Miller	Television film	
1999	The Simple Life of Noah Dearborn	Noah Dearborn	Television film	
2001	The Last Brickmaker in America	Henry Cobb	Television film	

==== As himself ====
Year	Title	Notes
1962	The Jack Paar Tonight Show	1 episode
1969	The Mike Douglas Show	1 episode
1972	The Dick Cavett Show	1 episode
1972	The New Bill Cosby Show	1 episode
1975	The Merv Griffin Show	1 episode
1979	The Mike Douglas Show	1 episode
2000–2007	The Oprah Winfrey Show	5 episodes
2008	Larry King Live	1 episode

== Stage ==
=== Actor ===
Theatre credits
Year	Title	Role	Venue(s)	Refs.
1946	Lysistrata	Polydorus	Belasco Theatre, Broadway	
1947	Anna Lucasta	Lester	National Theater, Broadway	
1947–1948	Anna Lucasta	Lester	North American tour	
1948	The Fisherman	Henry	American Negro Theatre, New York	
1950	Longitude '49	Brooks	New Playwrights, New York	
1959	A Raisin in the Sun	Walter Lee Younger	Ethel Barrymore Theater, Broadway	

=== Director ===
1968: Carry Me Back to Morningside Heights - Golden Theatre, Broadway

== Works cited ==
- Keyser, Lester J.; Ruszkowski, André (1980). The Cinema of Sidney Poitier. San Diego: A. S. Barnes. ISBN 0-498-02283-8.
- Klotman, Phyllis Rauch; Gibson, Gloria J., eds. (1997). Frame by Frame II: A Filmography of the African American Image, 1978-1994. Bloomington: Indiana University Press. ISBN 978-0-253-21120-0.
- McCluskey, Audrey T., ed. (2007). Frame by Frame III: a Filmography of the African Diasporan Image, 1994-2004. Bloomington: Indiana University Press. ISBN 978-0-253-34829-6.
- Gevinson, Alan (1997). Within Our Gates. Berkeley, California: University of California Press. ISBN 978-0-520-20964-0.
