= Johnny Sekka =

Gambian-English actor (1934–2006)

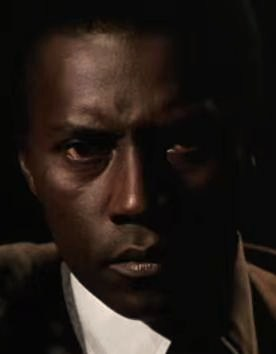
- Sekka in Uptown Saturday Night (1974)
- Born: Lamine Secka; 21 July 1934; Dakar, Senegal
- Died: 14 September 2006 (aged 72); Agua Dulce, California, U.S.
- Occupation: Actor
- Years active: 1958–1993
- Spouse: Cecilia Enger (m. 1964)
- Children: 1

Johnny Sekka (born Lamine Secka, 21 July 1934 – 14 September 2006) was a Senegalese actor.

== Early life and move to Europe ==
He was born Lamine Secka in Dakar, Senegal to a Wolof family, the youngest of five siblings; his Gambian father died shortly after his birth. When he was still young, his Senegalese mother sent him to live with an aunt in Georgetown (now Janjanbureh) in the Gambia, but he ran away to live on the streets in the capital, then known as Bathurst (now Banjul).

During the Second World War he found employment as an interpreter at an American air base in Dakar. He then worked on the docks. When he was 20, he stowed away on a ship to Marseille, France, and lived for three years in Paris.

He arrived in London, England in 1952, and served for two years in the Royal Air Force, where he first received the nickname "Johnny", but then Bermudian actor Earl Cameron persuaded him to become an actor, and he attended RADA. He became a stagehand at the Royal Court Theatre, and appeared on stage in various plays from 1958.

He had a small part in the 1958 film version of Look Back in Anger, directed by Tony Richardson, who had seen him on stage. He took a leading role in the 1961 film Flame in the Streets, playing the Jamaican boyfriend of the (white) daughter (played by Sylvia Syms) of a liberal working-class trades unionist (played by John Mills). He also had a leading role in the 1961 film for ITV, The Big Pride, by Guyanese writer Jan Carew and Jamaican writer Sylvia Wynter. The film was set in then British Guiana; Sekka's character was a young prisoner who broke out with his older mentor.

He lived for a period in Paris, where he met his future wife, Cecilia Enger. He continued in British films during the 1960s, portraying stereotypical roles, such as a manservant in the film Woman of Straw (1964), and in other films, such as East of Sudan (1964), Khartoum (1966) and The Last Safari (1967). He also appeared on television, in programmes such as The Human Jungle, Z-Cars, Dixon of Dock Green, Gideon's Way, Danger Man, and a 1968 episode of The Avengers.

In 1968, he also played the lead role in a West End production of Night of Fame. According to his obituary in The Times, this was the first time that a black actor had played a role written for a white man in English theatre. He was seen as a British equivalent to Sidney Poitier, and was frustrated that actors who started out at around the same time as him – such as Sean Connery, Terence Stamp, Michael Caine, Tom Courtenay and John Hurt – had become stars, and he had not.

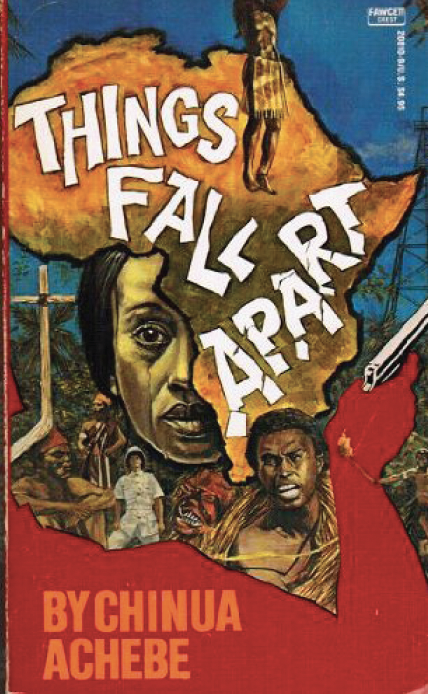
Cover of Things Fall Apart (1985) | Collage of film stills by Stephen Goldblatt

In 1970, the novel Things Fall Apart by Chinua Achebe was turned into a film of the same name - also known as Bullfrog In The Sun - directed by the award-winning German filmmaker and producer Hansjürgen Pohland [de] and starred Princess Elizabeth of Toro, Johnny Sekka and Orlando Martins. In 1965, Nigerian co-producer Francis Oladele founded Calpenny Nigeria Limited, the first film production company in Nigeria after independence. Things Fall Apart - his second production - was considered lost for decades until more than 2,000 stills by Stephen Goldblatt, production documents, correspondence, contemporary newspaper clippings and more were found in a satellite storage of the Deutsche Kinemathek Berlin in 2019. This led to the development of an extensive research and digitisation project on Nigerian film heritage, with exhibitions and screenings in Lagos, Kampala, Abidjan, Accra and Atlanta, among other places. In his essay "Why 'Things Fall Apart' is still a very relevant Black film till this day", Lagos-based contemporary artist Mallam Mudi Yahaya describes the complex background of the production.

== Later life ==
Sekka eventually moved to the United States with the aim of getting better roles. He had minor parts in the films A Warm December (1972) and Uptown Saturday Night (1974), both directed by Poitier. The first also featured Earl Cameron and the second Bill Cosby and Richard Pryor. These roles led to a more memorable role in the sitcom Good Times, where he portrayed Ibe, Thelma's (BernNadette Stanis) African love interest. In 1976, he starred in the movie Mohammad, Messenger of God (also known as The Message) about the origin of Islam and the message of Muhammad, in which he played Muhammad's Ethiopian companion Bilal al-Habashi. He appeared in the 1982 film Hanky Panky, and played Banda in the 1984 miniseries Master of the Game.

He was not cast in Roots (1977), being considered insufficiently American, but secured a role in the sequel, Roots: The Next Generations (1979), playing an African interpreter. Sekka is widely known among science fiction fans for his role as Dr. Benjamin Kyle in the television series Babylon 5's pilot movie, The Gathering (1993).

Recurring health problems forced him to decline a future role in the series, and ultimately were the reason he retired from acting altogether.

== Death ==
On 14 September 2006, Sekka died of lung cancer at his ranch in Agua Dulce, California, aged 72, survived by his wife Cecilia and son. He is buried at Holy Cross Cemetery, Culver City.

== Filmography ==
- The Big Pride (1961) — Smallboy Dowling
- Flame in the Streets (1961) – Peter Lincoln
- The Wild and the Willing (1962) – Reggie
- Woman of Straw (1964) – Thomas
- East of Sudan (1964) – Kimrasi
- Z-Cars (1964) TV Series - A Place of Safety - Adigun Sadik
- Khartoum (1966) – Khaleel
- The Last Safari (1967) – Jama
- The Southern Star (1969) – Matakit
- Incense for the Damned (1970) – Bob Kirby
- Things Fall Apart (1971)
- Reou-Takh (1972) – Bob (uncredited)
- A Warm December (1973) – Dr. Joseph Myomo
- Visit to a Chief's Son (1974) – Nemolok
- Uptown Saturday Night (1974) – Geechie's Henchman
- The Message (1976) – Bilal
- Ashanti (1979) – Captain Bradford
- Charlie Chan and the Curse of the Dragon Queen (1981) – Stefan
- Hanky Panky (1982) – Lacey
- Fever Pitch (1985) – Chocolate
- Passion and Paradise (1989) – Alfred Adderly
- Babylon 5: The Gathering (1993) - Benjamin Kyle, M.D.
