= List of awards and nominations received by Sidney Poitier =

List of Sidney Poitier awards
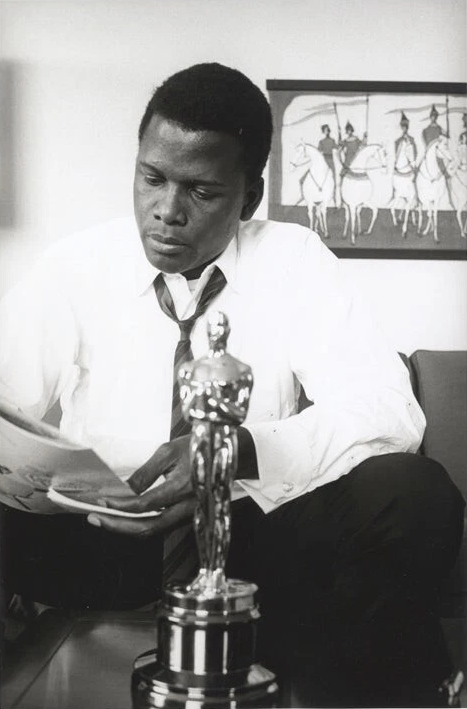
- Poitier and his Oscar in 1964
Award	Wins	Nominations
Academy Awards	2	3
BAFTA Awards	1	6
Golden Globe Awards	2	10
Screen Actors Guild Awards	1	2
Primetime Emmy Awards	0	2
Screen Actors Guild Awards	0	1
Tony Awards	0	1

Sidney Poitier was a Bahamian-American actor known for his performances on the stage and screen.

He became the first Black actor to win the Academy Award for Best Actor for Lilies of the Field (1963). He also received a Grammy Award, two Golden Globe Awards and a British Academy Film Award. Poitier received numerous honoraries during his lifetime including the Academy Honorary Award for his lifetime achievement in film in 2001. In 1992, he received the AFI Life Achievement Award. In 1994, he received a star on the Hollywood Walk of Fame. In 1981, he received the Golden Globe Cecil B. DeMille Award and in 2016 he received the BAFTA Fellowship.

In 1995, Poitier received the Kennedy Center Honor and in 2009, he was awarded the Presidential Medal of Freedom from Barack Obama. He was also awarded as Knight Commander of the Order of the British Empire by Queen Elizabeth II in 1974.

== Awards ==
=== Academy Awards ===
Year	Category	Nominated work	Result	Ref.
1958	Best Actor	The Defiant Ones	Nominated	
1963	Best Actor	Lilies of the Field	Won	
2001	Honorary Academy Award		Received	

=== Berlin International Film Festival ===
Year	Category	Nominated work	Result	Ref.
1958	Silver Bear for Best Actor	The Defiant Ones	Won	
1963	Silver Bear for Best Actor	Lilies of the Field	Won	

=== British Academy Film Awards ===
Year	Category	Nominated work	Result	Ref.
1958	Best Foreign Actor	Edge of the City	Nominated	
1959	Best Foreign Actor	The Defiant Ones	Won	
1962	Best Foreign Actor	A Raisin in the Sun	Nominated	
1965	Best Foreign Actor	Lilies of the Field	Nominated	
1967	Best Foreign Actor	A Patch of Blue	Nominated	
1968	Best Foreign Actor	In the Heat of the Night	Nominated	
2016	BAFTA Fellowship		Received	

=== Golden Globe Awards ===
Year	Category	Nominated work	Result	Ref.
1958	Best Actor - Motion Picture Drama	The Defiant Ones	Nominated	
1959	Best Actor - Motion Picture Musical or Comedy	Porgy and Bess	Nominated	
1961	Best Actor - Motion Picture Drama	A Raisin in the Sun	Nominated	
1963	Best Actor - Motion Picture Drama	Lilies of the Field	Won	
1965	Best Actor - Motion Picture Drama	A Patch of Blue	Nominated	
1967	Best Actor - Motion Picture Drama	In the Heat of the Night	Nominated	
1968	Henrietta Award	World Film Favorite	Won	
1969	Henrietta Award	World Film Favorite	Nominated	
1970	Henrietta Award	World Film Favorite	Nominated	
1981	Cecil B. DeMille Award		Received	
1991	Best Actor - Miniseries or Television Film	Separate but Equal	Nominated	

=== Grammy Awards ===
Year	Category	Nominated work	Result	Ref.
2001	Best Spoken Word Album	The Measure of a Man	Won	
2009	Best Spoken Word Album	Life Beyond Measure	Nominated	

=== Primetime Emmy Awards ===
Year	Category	Nominated work	Result	Ref.
1991	Outstanding Lead Actor in a Miniseries or Special	Separate but Equal	Nominated	
1997	Outstanding Lead Actor in a Miniseries or Special	Mandela and de Klerk	Nominated	

=== Screen Actors Guild Awards ===
Year	Category	Nominated work	Result	Ref.
1998	Outstanding Actor in a Miniseries of Television Movie	Mandela and de Klerk	Nominated	
2000	Life Achievement Award		Received	

=== Tony Awards ===
Year	Category	Nominated work	Result	Ref.
1960	Best Leading Actor in a Play	A Raisin in the Sun	Nominated	

== Honorary Awards ==
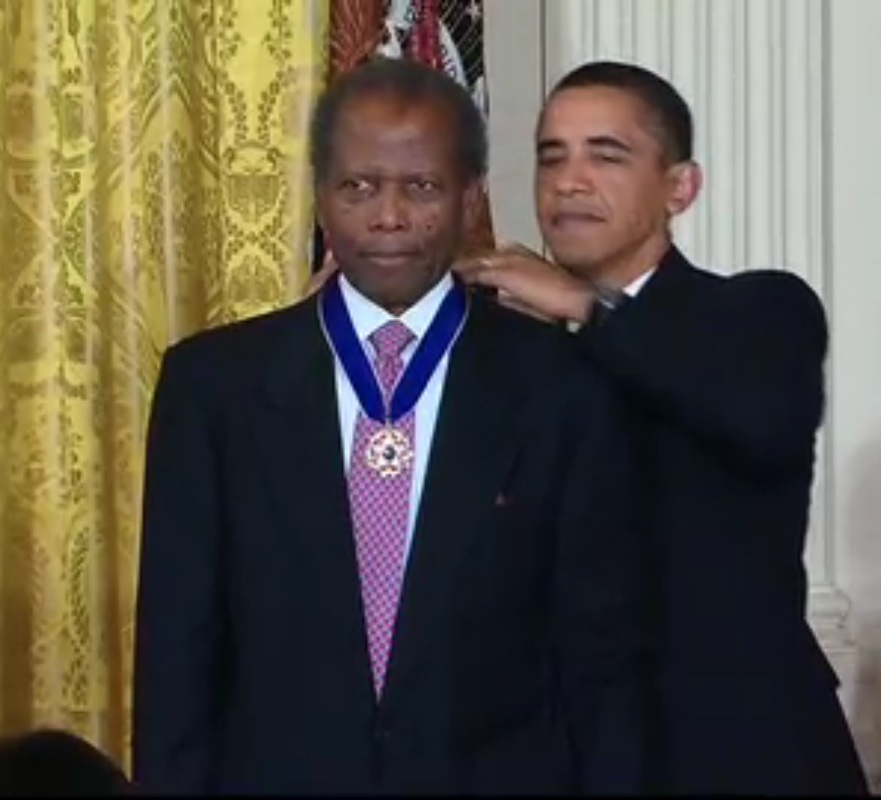
Poitier receiving the Presidential Medal of Freedom from Barack Obama in 2009

=== AFI Life Achievement Award ===
- In 1992, Poitier received the AFI Life Achievement Award.

=== Kennedy Center Honors ===
- In 1995, Poitier received the Kennedy Center Honor

=== Presidential Medal of Freedom ===
- In 2009, Poitier was awarded the Presidential Medal of Freedom from Barack Obama.

=== Walk of Fame ===
- In 1994, Poitier received a star on the Hollywood Walk of Fame at 7065 Hollywood Blvd.

=== Honorary Knighthood ===
- 1974: Honorary Knight Commander of the Order of the British Empire (KBE)

=== Other tributes ===
- 1958: Silver Bear for Best Actor (Berlin Film Festival) for The Defiant Ones
- 1963: Silver Bear for Best Actor (Berlin Film Festival) for Lilies of the Field
- 1997: Appointed non-resident Bahamian Ambassador to Japan
- 2011: Film Society of Lincoln Center Gala Tribute honoring his life and careers
- 2014: Golden Plate Award of the American Academy of Achievement, presented by Awards Council member Oprah Winfrey

== See also ==
- List of African-American actors
- African-American Tony nominees and winners — Performance by an Actor in a Leading Role in a Play
- List of black Academy Award winners and nominees — Best Actor in a Leading Role
- List of actors with Academy Award nominations
- List of actors with more than one Academy Award nomination in the acting categories
- List of black Golden Globe Award winners and nominees
- List of Golden Globe winners
- David Hampton, an impostor who posed as Poitier's son "David" in 1983, which inspired the 1990 play and 1993 film Six Degrees of Separation
- John Stewart, aka Green Lantern, a DC Comics superhero whose original design was based on Poitier
