= Esther Anderson (Jamaican actress) =

Jamaican filmmaker, photographer, and actress (born 1943)

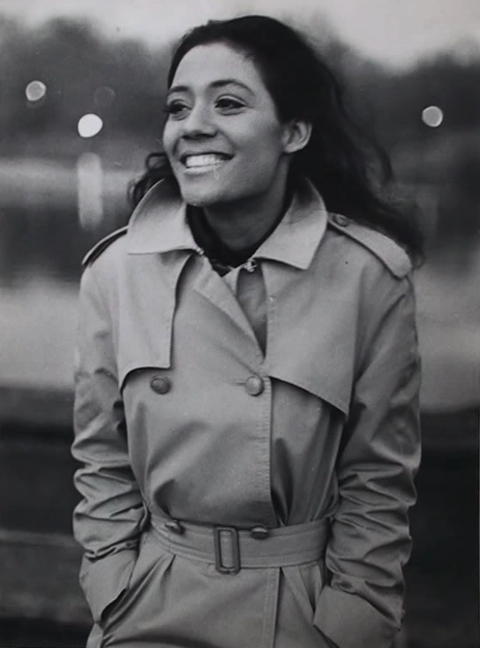
- Born: August 4, 1943 (age 83); Highgate, St Mary, Colony of Jamaica, British Empire
- Other name: Ester Anderson
- Occupations: Filmmaker, photographer, actress
- Years active: 1960–present

Esther Anderson (born August 4, 1943) is a Jamaican filmmaker, photographer, and actress, sometimes listed in credits as Ester Anderson.

== Biography ==
=== Early life ===
Anderson was born in the parish of St. Mary on the north coast of Jamaica. Her father Randolph Wymess Anderson was an architect and planter. Her mother, Ivy Mae Mahon, belonged to a well-established Indian community in St Mary. Esther studied at Highgate High School in Highgate, Jamaica, and at the Quaker Finishing School, where she joined the St. John Ambulance Brigade. At the age of 14, she moved to Kingston to live with her paternal grandmother at the family home in Half Way Tree.

Organizers of a 1960 Miss Jamaica beauty contest invited her to participate as "Miss Four Aces". At this time she met former Governor of Jamaica Lord Caradon, his aide-de-camp Chris Blackwell, Premier Norman Manley and Jamaica's first Prime Minister Sir Alexander Bustamante. The jury awarded her the first prize, but changed it to third prize while Anderson was still on stage after realizing she was underage. Anderson's father was angry she had entered the contest. This and the excessive public attention following the contest led Anderson to use the prize proceeds to travel to England.

In July 1961, Anderson arrived in London, where she began modeling for the artist Aubrix Rix, an illustrator for Woman's Own magazine whom she had met in Kingston with Dr Ken McNeill. She studied drama at the Actor's Workshop in London. She combined her studies with a modeling career, doing photo shoots and commercials for Africa and Asia. She was tested and won the contract for a series of commercials as the dancing girl advertising Kent's Doncella Cigars. She was offered a role in a documentary film by Jo Menell, who was a producer journalist for the television program Panorama. The film was directed by Riccardo Aragno. They filmed part of the scenes at the Crazy Elephant club, where Anderson worked as a DJ at nights. As a dancer, she had trained with Trinidadian Boscoe Holder, brother of Geoffrey Holder, while going to drama school. Anderson and her sister Thelma (later Tiffany Anderson) auditioned for the producer Elkan Allan and director Michael Lindsay-Hogg, and they teamed up as dancers and choreographers for Ready Steady Go!, the number-one pop show on British television at the time. They appeared as the Anderson Sisters, with The Rolling Stones, The Animals, The Walker Brothers, Sonny and Cher, Cathy McGowan and Donovan. Anderson was offered a part in a film that Marty Ransohoff was making in Europe called The Sandpiper (1965).

=== Island Records ===
Anderson helped to develop the Jamaican music label Island Records from the early 1960s, selling Jamaican records with Chris Blackwell from a Mini Cooper, writing lyrics, taking stock, and promoting and managing all the Jamaican artists that went through Island Records, including Millie Small, Jimmy Cliff, and Bob Marley and the Wailers.

Anderson took iconic photographs of Marley, Peter Tosh, and Bunny Wailer and contributed lyrics to the albums Catch a Fire, Burnin', and Natty Dread.

=== Acting career ===
In parallel with her photography and work with Island Records, Anderson steadily developed a career as an actress. She secured roles in a number of early 1960s British television shows, including Dixon of Dock Green and The Avengers. She played roles in movies such as Henry Levin's Genghis Khan for Columbia Pictures, Robert Freeman's The Touchables for Twentieth Century Fox, Ted Kotcheff's Two Gentlemen Sharing, Jerry Lewis's One More Time for United Artists, and Sidney Poitier's A Warm December for First Artists. In this latter film, her role of an African princess won her an NAACP Image Award for Best Actress in 1973.

She helped to launch the film industry in Jamaica, acting as co-producer of the film The Harder They Come (1972), urging director Perry Henzell to give the lead to local Jimmy Cliff rather than to American Johnny Nash. She coached Cliff for the partly autobiographical role and organized financing for the soundtrack, bringing in Chris Blackwell to put up the US$5,000 needed to complete the film as well as releasing the soundtrack on Island Records (1973).

=== Photography ===
Her photographic collection was exhibited at The Photographers' Gallery in London. She was represented by Sygma photo agency in Paris, later bought by Bill Gates' agency Corbis, by the Stephen Bulger Gallery in Toronto.. She is represented by ADAGP in Paris.

Anderson continues to develop her work as a photographer and documentary maker. She has been exhibited by Les Frigos in Paris, The Photographers' Gallery in London, the Stephen Bulger Gallery in Toronto, Canada, and in the Caribbean by Niki Michelin in Antigua. Her portraits include as subjects: Louise Bennett, Marlon Brando, Bob Marley, Amanda Lear, Catherine Deneuve, Prince Charles, Prince of Wales, Denzel Washington, Jacques Chirac.

=== Filmmaking career ===
As a filmmaker, Anderson's first film Short Ends was an official selection at the 1976 Edinburgh Film Festival. She researched the lives of people of color at the Library of Congress, Washington, DC, developing the idea of making films on positive role models.

The first of these films, The Three Dumas (the story behind The Count of Monte Cristo), was produced in collaboration with architect Gian Godoy under the banner of Trenhorne Films (UK), and is a dramatized documentary about novelist Alexandre Dumas and his ancestors: the grandson of the French Marquis de la Pailleterie and an enslaved African, Dumas overcame all the obstacles of prejudice to become a role model of contemporary literature. Anderson herself portrays General Toussaint L'Ouverture, leader of the Haitian Revolution. The avant-premiere of The Three Dumas took place in 2005 in France at Villers-Cotterets, birthplace of Dumas, to coincide with the inauguration of a statue of him in the presence of the French Minister of Culture. The UK premiere took place in 2007 at the Museum of London Docklands, coinciding with the inauguration of the new Sugar and Slavery Gallery during the bicentenary commemorations of the 1807 Abolition of the Slave Trade Act. Other screenings around the world include the British Film Institute, Canadian Museum of Civilization, McCord Museum, Massachusetts Historical Society, McCormick Tribune Freedom Museum, University of Leeds, University of Nottingham, University of Birmingham, Centro Cultural Palacio La Moneda, V&A, and an official selection at the Portobello Film Festival.

== Bob Marley: The Making of a Legend ==
The second film of her trilogy, Bob Marley: The Making of a Legend (in collaboration with Gian Godoy), was screened as work-in-progress at the British Film Institute NFT1 on March 19, 2011. It is based on footage Anderson shot in the early 1970s that was lost for more than 30 years. In a 2013 interview Anderson said: "Twelve years ago I got my footage back. One day a man came to interview me from Channel 4, and I saw the footage and said, that’s mine. He said he’d found [the film reels] in a garage in Canada. They were completely destroyed and had to be baked to bring the images back."

The film is a kaleidoscopic portrait, with the narrator taking the viewer on a journey to the Caribbean islands, to Jamaica and into 56 Hope Road, Kingston, to see and hear the young Bob Marley before he was famous. While exploring the powerful relationship between Anderson and Marley, the film shows the Wailers' first rehearsal, when the idea of a Jamaican supergroup such as the Beatles or the Rolling Stones was still just a dream, and sits in on the launch of their international career with "Get Up, Stand Up", "I Shot the Sheriff", and the groundbreaking Burnin′ and Catch a Fire albums that brought together reggae music and Rastafari consciousness, starting a revolution that would change rock music and contemporary world culture.

This musical documentary was chosen to commemorate the 30th anniversary of Marley's passing in film festivals around the world, including: official selection at the Edinburgh International Film Festival 2011; official selection at Jamaica's Reggae Film Festival 2011, winning a UNESCO Honor Award; official selection at the Rhode Island International Film Festival 2011; official selection at the DocMiami International Film Festival 2011; official selection at the Festival de Cine Documental de la Ciudad de Mexico 2011; official selection at the Buffalo International Film Festival 2011; official selection at the Hawaii International Film Festival 2011; Bob Marley Charity Gala New York Premiere at the Tribeca Cinemas in Manhattan sponsored by Caribbean Education Foundation CEO Nikiki Bogle; official selection at the Festival Internacional de Cine de Valdivia 2011; official selection at the Hollywood Black Film Festival 2011; official selection at the Maryland International Film Festival 2011; official selection at the Rototom Sunsplash European Reggae Festival 2011; official selection at the Chagrin Documentary Film Festival 2011; nomination for Best Feature; official selection at the Silicon Valley Film Festival 2011; official selection at the Hawaii International Film Festival 2011.

Bob Marley: The Making of a Legend had its London premiere at the British Film Institute (NFT1) on December 17, 2011.

== Awards and honours ==
In 1976, Anderson received the Trendsetter Award at a ceremony organized by Billboard magazine on behalf of Denny Cordell of Mango Records and Chris Blackwell of Island Records in New York for introducing reggae to the American market. In 1981, the mayor of Memphis, Tennessee, made Anderson an honorary citizen for her contribution to films and music. In 2015, she received the Voice of a Woman Distinction Award for outstanding contributions to film in a career that has spanned over 50 years. In 2016, Councilwoman Barbara Kramer presented Anderson with an official city proclamation declaring February 26 as "Esther Anderson Community Arts Day" on behalf of the City of North Miami Beach Cultural Committee for encouraging cultural events that celebrate music, film and photography and for her dedication to the arts over the past 40 years.

== Personal life ==
She currently lives and works in London and Paris. She dated actor Marlon Brando from 1965 to 1972.

== Filmography ==
=== Television ===
Year	Title	Role	Notes
1966	The Avengers	Lala	TV series
1968	Dixon of Dock Green	Sally Tate	TV series
1968	The Wednesday Play	Esla (English – Born and Bred)	TV series
1975	The Rookies	Pamela (two episodes)	TV series

=== Film ===
Year	Film	Role	Notes
1965	Genghis Khan	Concubine	Movie
1966	Theatre of Death	La Poule	Movie
1968	The Touchables	Melanie	Movie
1969	Two Gentlemen Sharing	Caroline	Movie
1970	C-Film	Esther	Movie
1970	One More Time	Billie	Movie
1973	A Warm December	Catherine	Movie
2007	The Three Dumas	Toussaint Louverture	Movie

=== Filmmaker ===
Year	Film	Role	Notes
1976	Short Ends	Writer/Director/Composer/Producer	Movie
2007	The Three Dumas	Writer/Director/Producer	Documentary
2011	Bob Marley: The Making of a Legend	Writer/Director/Composer/Producer	Documentary
