= Gian Godoy =

Chilean film director (born 1966)

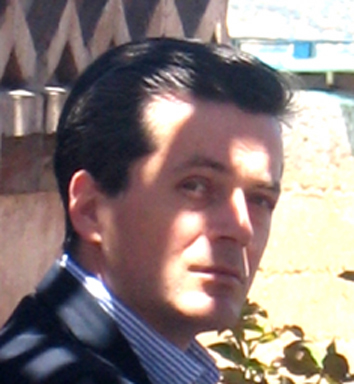
- Born: 1966 (age 59–60); Santiago, Chile
- Occupations: Filmmaker sculptor
- Years active: 1992–present

Gian Godoy RIBA Part 1 (born Santiago, 1966) is a filmmaker, architectural designer and artist.

As an architectural designer, Godoy undertook collaborative work at the studios of Carme Pinós and Enric Miralles in Barcelona and at the architectural office of Ben van Berkel in Amsterdam. Godoy restored the Bob Marley house in the west coast of Jamaica in 2000. Co-founder of the architectural group Grupo Okazo S.A.C. with architect Joszep in 2010. Design and inauguration with Luis Contreras of Inkarri, the Wakapacha manifesto on contemporary architecture based on the ancient principles of the Tawantinsuyu, at the Puruchuco Museum in Lima, Peru, in 2012, and at the Colegio de Arquitectos del Perú. Founder of Soloeil Atelier of Architecture & Ecology.

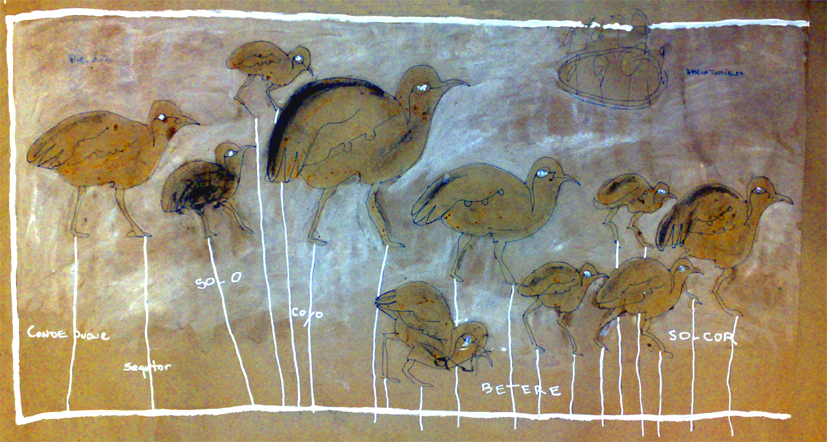
Catimbano, Ruinas de Huanchaca, Antofagasta, Chile

In 2008, Godoy launched the Animas Project at the Museo Histórico Nacional (Chile) in Santiago: 200 works of art to commemorate 200 years of Chile's independence. In 2009, the sculpture La Quintrala was inaugurated at the Museo de Santiago, Casa Colorada, with a new launch of Animas at the Biblioteca Nacional de Chile. His sculpture, Catimbano, made with copper cathodes from Chuquicamata mine, was inaugurated at the Museo Desierto de Atacama in Antofagasta. Godoy premiered his Animas film Hain at the AVIFF 2011 in Cannes, France.

Godoy's first film, The Three Dumas, also known as The Story of The Count of Monte Cristo, was produced in collaboration with filmmaker Esther Anderson under the banner of Trenhorne Films. The Three Dumas is a dramatised documentary about novelist Alexandre Dumas and his ancestors: the grandson of a French planter and an enslaved African Caribbean, Dumas overcame all the obstacles of prejudice to become a role model of contemporary literature. The avant-premiere of The Three Dumas took place in 2005 in France in Villers-Cotterets, birthplace of Dumas, to coincide with the inauguration of a statue of Dumas himself in the presence of the French Minister of Culture. The UK premiere took place in 2007 at the Museum of London Docklands, coinciding with the inauguration of the new Sugar and Slavery Gallery during the bicentenary commemorations of the abolition of the Slave Trade Act 1807. Other screenings around the world include the British Film Institute, Canadian Museum of Civilization, McCord Museum, Massachusetts Historical Society, McCormick Tribune Freedom Museum, University of Leeds, University of Nottingham, University of Birmingham, Centro Cultural Palacio La Moneda, V&A, and an Official Selection at the Portobello Film Festival.

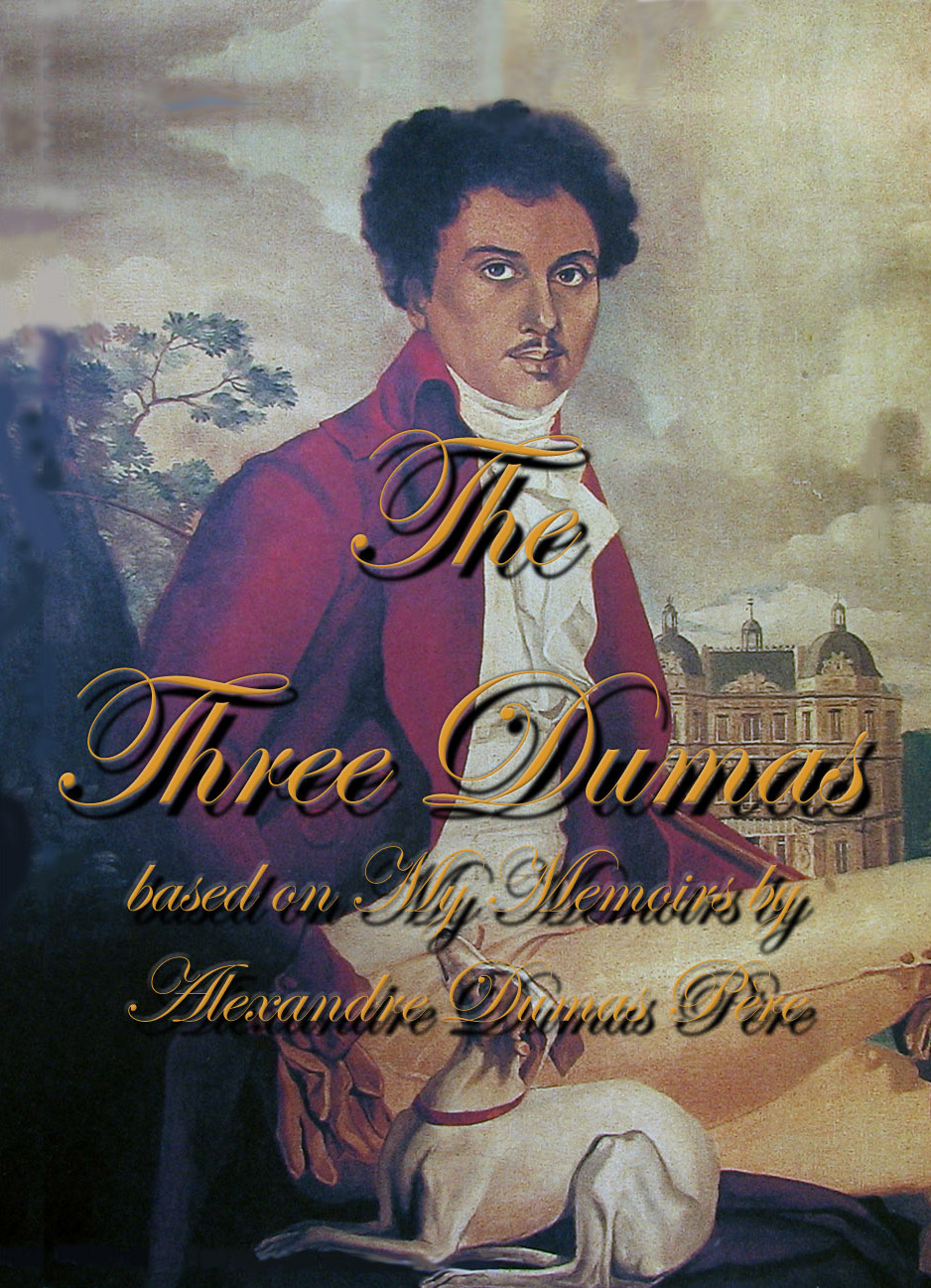
The Three Dumas, Bicentenary of the Abolition of the Slave Trade, Museum of London Docklands

Godoy's second film collaboration with Esther Anderson, Bob Marley: The Making of a Legend, was an Official Selection at the Edinburgh International Film Festival 2011. and Buffalo International Film Festival. Bob Marley: The Making of a Legend was screened as work-in-progress at the British Film Institute NFT1 on 19 March 2011. Based on the footage Anderson shot in the early 1970s and lost for more than thirty years, the film is a kaleidoscopic portrait where the narrator takes the viewer on a journey to the Caribbean islands, to Jamaica and into 56 Hope Road, Kingston, to see and hear the young Bob Marley before he was famous. While exploring the powerful relationship between Anderson and Marley, the film shows the Wailers' first rehearsal, when the idea of a Jamaican supergroup like the Beatles or the Rolling Stones was still just a dream, and sits in on the launch of their international career with "Get Up, Stand Up", "I Shot the Sheriff", and the Burnin' and Catch a Fire albums that brought reggae music and Rastafari consciousness together as one, starting a revolution that would change rock music and contemporary culture.

Godoy's other films include Earthquake of Time, Special Prize for an Audivisual Essay at the XII Human Rights Film Festival Cine Otro of Valparaíso, Chile, in 2018. Earthquake of Time was an official selection at the 7th Resistencia Film Fest in Tomé, Chile; 13th Muestra de Cine+Video Indígena in Chile; Parana International Films Festival in Argentina in 2020; Finalist at The Lift-off Sessions in the UK in 2020; Native Spirit Film Festival in the UK in 2020; International Ethnographic Film Festival OKO in Ukraine in 2020; 8th Muestra de Documentales Derechos Humanos in Uruguay in 2019; The Indie For You Film Festival in the US in 2020. The film also premiered at international museums and universities such as the Museo del Barro in Paraguay in 2019; Museo Memoria y Tolerancia in Mexico; Museo de Antofagasta; Museo Regional de Iquique; La Ciencia del Cine at the Universidad de Santiago de Chile; Université Bordeaux-Montaigne in France; Rennes 2 University in France; Institut d'ethnologie at the Université de Strasbourg; Centre for Contemporary Latin American Studies at the University of Edinburgh in Scotland in 2019. The documentary trilogy El Terremoto de Chile was released in 2019 and 2020 to expose human rights violations following the 2019–2021 Chilean protests.
