= Earl Cameron =

Bermudian actor (1917–2020)

Earl Cameron CBE
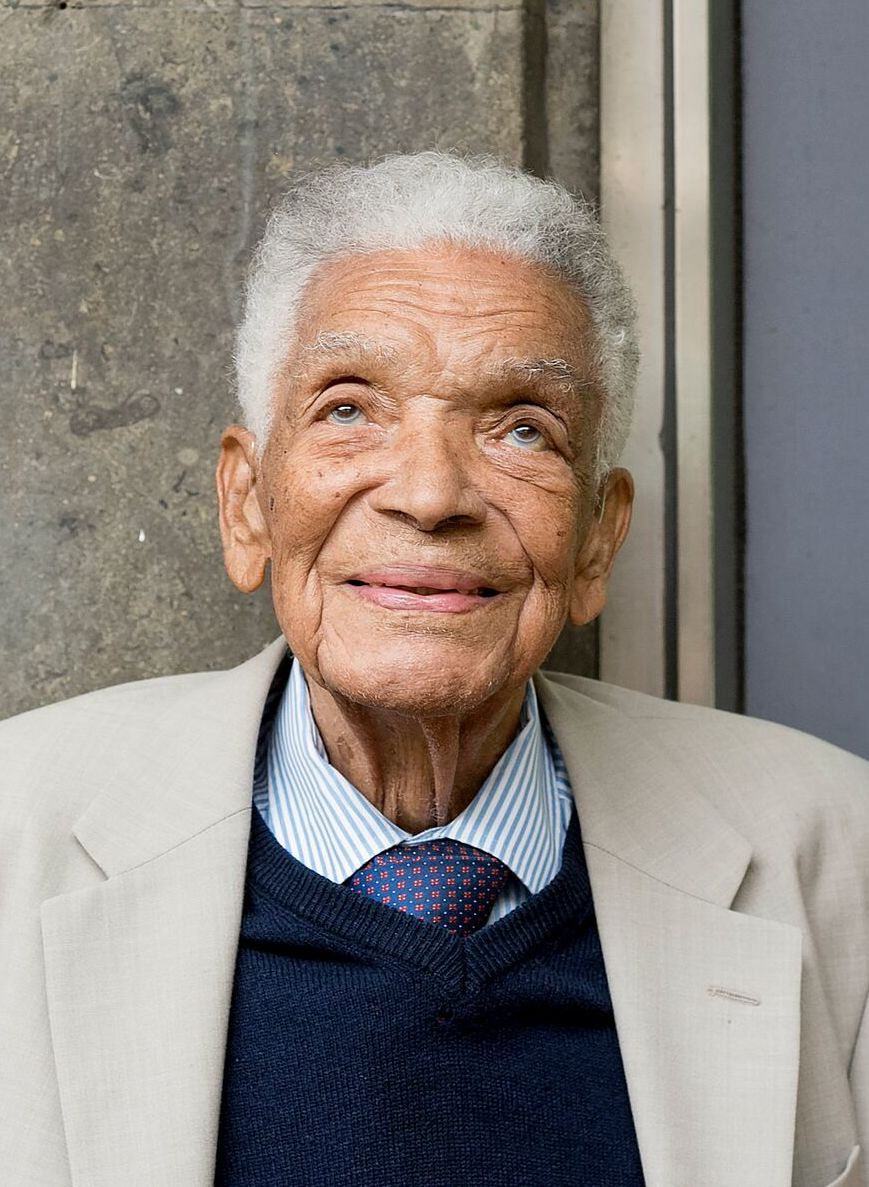
- Earl Cameron (aged 100) in 2017
- Born: Earlston Jewitt Cameron; 8 August 1917; Pembroke, Bermuda
- Died: 3 July 2020 (aged 102); Kenilworth, Warwickshire, England
- Occupation: Actor
- Years active: 1941–2013 • 2017
- Spouses: Audrey J. P. Godowski (m. 1959; died 1994); Barbara Bower (m. 1994)
- Children: 6

Earlston Jewett Cameron (Note: Some use report his given name as "Jewitt" instead of "Jewett". The Oxford Dictionary of National Biography uses "Jewett".) CBE (8 August 1917 – 3 July 2020), known as Earl Cameron, was a Bermudian actor who lived and worked in the United Kingdom. After appearing on London's West End stage, he became one of the first black stars in the British film industry.

With his appearance in 1951's Pool of London, Cameron became one of the first black actors to take up a starring role in a British film after Paul Robeson, Nina Mae McKinney and Elisabeth Welch in the 1930s.

According to Screenonline, "Earl Cameron brought a breath of fresh air to the British film industry's stuffy depictions of race relations. Often cast as a sensitive outsider, Cameron gave his characters a grace and moral authority that often surpassed the films' compromised liberal agendas."

He starred alongside Sean Connery in Thunderball (1965). He made appearances in many 1960s British science fiction programmes, including Doctor Who, where he was reportedly one of the first black actors to play an astronaut on television, The Prisoner, and The Andromeda Breakthrough. His film appearances continued until 2013, when he was 96.

== Early career ==
Cameron was born in Pembroke, Bermuda, and grew up on Princess Street, Hamilton. His father was a stonemason who died in 1922, after which Cameron's mother took on various jobs to support the family. As a young man, Cameron joined the British Merchant Navy: "I was working on a ship, going from Bermuda to New York and back. I always had a great desire to travel as a kid, and so I transferred to another ship called the Eastern Prince sailing to South America. On our second trip, the war started. ...the British Admiralty sent for the ship, and that brought me to London." He went AWOL, claiming: "I arrived in London on 29 October 1939. I got involved with a young lady and you know the rest. The ship left without me, and the girl walked out too."

Cameron faced difficulties as a black person trying to find employment; he was reluctantly taken on as a dishwasher in a hotel and had to accept whatever casual work came his way. In 1941, his friend Harry Crossman gave Cameron a ticket to see a revival of Chu Chin Chow at the Palace Theatre. Crossman and five other black actors had bit parts in the West End production. Cameron, who was working at the kitchen of the Strand Corner House at the time, was fed up with menial jobs and asked Crossman if he could get him on the show. He told Cameron that all the parts had been cast, but two or three weeks later, when one of the actors did not show up, Crossman arranged a meeting with the director Robert Atkins, who cast Cameron on the spot.

According to Cameron, he had an easier time than other black actors because his Bermudian accent sounded American to British ears (Bermuda, nearest to North Carolina, was settled as an extension of Virginia and retained strong links to Virginia and the Carolinas for the first two centuries of settlement, though it had remained British when they and ten other continental colonies had seceded to form the USA). The following year, he landed a speaking role as Joseph, the chauffeur in the American play The Petrified Forest by Robert E. Sherwood. He encountered fellow Bermudian Ernest Trimingham still working in the West End.

In 1945 and 1946, Cameron took on the role of one of the Dukes in the singing trio the Duchess and Two Dukes, which toured with the Entertainments National Service Association (ENSA) to play to British armed forces personnel in India in 1945, and the Netherlands in 1946. In 1946, Cameron went back to Bermuda for five months but then returned to work as an actor in the UK. He took a job on the London stage as an understudy in the play Deep Are the Roots. Written by Arnaud d'Usseau and James Gow, this play was staged at the Wyndham's Theatre in London for six months (featuring Gordon Heath) and then went on tour. It was during this tour that Cameron first met, and worked alongside, Patrick McGoohan during a production of that play in Coventry. In 2012, Cameron participated alongside local actors in Bermuda in a reading of Deep Are the Roots, which the Bermuda Sun described as a play "dear to Earl's heart, for it not only gave him his first break in the West End as Britain's first black actor, but he also met his first wife when he travelled on tour with the production."

He understudied in Deep are the Roots with fellow understudy Ida Shepley, a singer. As Cameron was having problems with his diction, she introduced him to voice coach Amanda Ira Aldridge, the daughter of Ira Aldridge, a black Shakespearian American actor of the 19th century.

== Film career ==
Cameron's breakthrough acting role was in Pool of London, a 1951 film directed by Basil Dearden, set in post-war London involving racial prejudice, romance — Cameron's character is a merchant sailor who falls in love with a young white woman, played by Susan Shaw — and a diamond robbery. He won much critical acclaim for his part in the film, which is considered "the first major role for a black actor in a British mainstream film".

Cameron's next major film role was in the 1955 film Simba. In this drama about the Mau Mau uprising in Kenya, Cameron played the role of Peter Karanja, a doctor trying to reconcile his admiration for Western civilisation with his Kikuyu heritage. That same year Cameron played the Mau Mau general Jeroge in Safari.

He told The Guardian in a 2017 interview: "I never saw myself as a pioneer. It was only later, looking back, that it occurred to me that I was." He also found work hard to come by: "Unless it was specified that this was a part for a black actor, they would never consider a black actor for the part. And they would never consider changing a white part to a black part. So that was my problem. I got mostly small parts, and that was extremely frustrating – not just for me but for other black actors. We had a very hard time getting worthwhile roles."

From the 1950s, Cameron gained major parts in many films, including: The Heart Within (1957), in which he played a character Victor Conway in a crime movie again set in the London docklands; and Sapphire (1959) in which he played Dr. Robbins, the brother of a murdered girl; and The Message (1976) – the story of the Prophet Muhammad, where he played the King of Abyssinia.

Cameron's other film appearances include Tarzan the Magnificent (1960), in which he played Tate; Flame in the Streets (1961), in which he played Gabriel Gomez; Tarzan's Three Challenges (1963), in which he played Mang; Guns at Batasi (1964), in which he played Captain Abraham; and Battle Beneath the Earth (1967), in which he played Sergeant Seth Hawkins; A Warm December (1973), working with Sidney Poitier and Esther Anderson, in which Cameron played the part of an African ambassador to the UK.

Cameron was considered for the role of Quarrel in Dr. No (1962) by director Terence Young and co-producer Albert R. Broccoli, whom he knew from his Warwick Films work; however, producer Harry Saltzman did not think him suitable for the role and cast John Kitzmiller. They asked Cameron back to the James Bond series for Thunderball (1965), in which he played Bond's Bahamian assistant Pinder. Cameron also acted alongside Thunderball lead Sean Connery in Cuba (1979), in which he played Colonel Levya.

Cameron's later film appearances include a major role in Sidney Pollack's The Interpreter (2005) as dictator Edmond Zuwanie who is a fictionised version of Robert Mugabe (then leader of Zimbabwe). Cameron's performance was praised. The Baltimore Sun wrote: "Earl Cameron is magnificent as the slimy old fraud of a dictator...", and Rolling Stone described his appearance as "subtle and menacing". Philip French in The Observer referred to "that fine Caribbean actor Earl Cameron". He appeared in a cameo as a portrait artist in the 2006 film The Queen (directed by Stephen Frears), alongside Helen Mirren. In 2010 he appeared as "Elderly Bald Man" in the film Inception. In 2013, he appeared as Grandad in the short film Up on the Roof.

== Television career ==
Cameron had roles in a wide range of TV shows, but one of his earliest major roles was a starring part in the BBC 1960 TV drama The Dark Man, in which he played a West Indian cab driver in the UK. The show examined the reactions and prejudices he faced in his work. In 1956 he had a smaller part in another BBC drama exploring racism in the workplace, A Man From The Sun, in which he appeared as community leader Joseph Brent, the cast also featuring Errol John, Cy Grant, Colin Douglas and Nadia Cattouse.

Cameron appeared in a range of popular television shows including series Danger Man (Secret Agent in the US) alongside series star Patrick McGoohan. Cameron worked with McGoohan again when he appeared in the TV series The Prisoner as the Haitian supervisor in the episode "The Schizoid Man" (1967).

His other television work includes Emergency – Ward 10, The Zoo Gang, Crown Court (two different stories in 1973, one as Antoine Mbula from the legal department of the Diplomatic Mission of Zaire in episode three of the three part story Wise Child ), Jackanory (a BBC children's series in which he read five of the Brer Rabbit stories in 1971), Dixon of Dock Green, Doctor Who – The Tenth Planet (reportedly becoming the first black actor to portray an astronaut on television, and also became only the seventh actor from the series to reach 100 years of age), Waking the Dead, Kavanagh QC, Babyfather, EastEnders (a small role as a Mr Lambert), Dalziel and Pascoe, and Lovejoy. In 1996 he appeared on BBC2 as The Abbot in Neverwhere, an urban fantasy television series by Neil Gaiman.

He also appeared in many one-off TV dramas, including: Television Playhouse (1957); A World Inside BBC (1962); ITV Play of the Week (two stories – The Gentle Assassin (1962) and I Can Walk Where I Like Can't I? (1964); the BBC's Wind Versus Polygamy (1968); ITV's A Fear of Strangers (1964), in which he played Ramsay, a black saxophonist and small-time criminal who is detained by the police on suspicion of murder and is also racially abused by a Chief Inspector Dyke (played by Stanley Baker); Festival: the Respectful Prostitute (1964); ITV Play of the Week – The Death of Bessie Smith (1965); Theatre 625: The Minister (1965); The Great Kandinsky (1994); and two episodes of Thirty-Minute Theatre (Anything You Say in 1969 and Soldier Ants in 1971).

== Radio work ==
In 2017, a month after his 100th birthday, Cameron was cast in a BBC Radio 4 adaptation of Neil Gaiman's novel Anansi Boys, starring Lenny Henry.

== Personal life ==
Cameron married his first wife, Audrey Godowski, in 1959. They had five children. She died in 1994.

Cameron also had a son from an earlier relationship with Marjorie Astwood.

From 1963, Cameron was a practitioner of the Baháʼí Faith, joining the religion at the time of the first Baháʼí World Congress, held at London's Royal Albert Hall.

In the mid-to-late 1970s, Cameron stopped acting for a time. He and his family moved to the Solomon Islands, as he sought to dedicate himself more fully to the Bahá'í faith. During this time, he ran an ice cream business in Honiara. Following the death of Audrey in 1994, Cameron returned to the UK and resumed his acting career.

The Bahá'í community held a reception in London in 2007 to honour his 90th birthday. He lived in Kenilworth, Warwickshire, England.

At the time of his death, he was married to his second wife, Barbara Bower.

== Honours ==
Cameron was appointed Commander of the Order of the British Empire (CBE) in the 2009 New Year Honours.

The Earl Cameron Theatre in Hamilton, Bermuda, was named in his honour at a ceremony he attended there in December 2012.

The University of Warwick awarded Cameron an honorary doctorate in January 2013.

In 2015, the British Film Institute (BFI) featured a special presentation and screening to honour Cameron's work.

In September 2016, he became the first inductee into the Screen Nation "Hall of Frame" at the BFI Southbank, where he was interviewed by Samira Ahmed.

In 2017, Cameron's 100th birthday was marked in Bermuda at an event he attended held at the theatre now named in honour of him.

In 2019, the Earl Cameron Award – for "a Bermudian professional who has demonstrated exceptional passion and talent in the field of theatre, cinematography, film or video production" – was established in his honour by the Bermuda Arts Council.

== Death and legacy ==
Cameron died at his home in Kenilworth, Warwickshire, England, on 3 July 2020 at the age of 102, surrounded by his wife and family.

His children said in a statement: "Our family have been overwhelmed by the outpourings of love and respect we have received at the news of our father's passing … As an artist and as an actor he refused to take roles that demeaned or stereotyped the character of people of colour. He was truly a man who stood by his moral principles and was inspirational."

Bermudian Premier Edward David Burt paid tribute to Cameron, describing him as an "iconic actor" and "a proud son of Bermuda whose constant, dignified presence added to stage and screen over decades. All Bermuda joins with me in celebrating his long and remarkable life." In the following days Cameron's films were shown on CITV government television.

In the UK, on Twitter, David Harewood described Cameron as a "total legend" and Paterson Joseph wrote: "His generation's pioneering shoulders are what my generation of actors stand on. No shoulders were broader than this gentleman with the voice of god and the heart of a kindly prince." Historian David Olusoga wrote: "A remarkable and wonderful man. Not just a brilliant actor but a link to a deeper history."

In 2021, Burt Caesar programmed a season of films and talks at the BFI commemorating the life and career of Earl Cameron.

== Filmography ==
Year	Title	Role	Notes
1951	Pool of London	Johnny Lambert	
1951	There Is Another Sun (or Wall of Death)	Ginger Jones	
1952	Emergency Call (or The Hundred Hour Hunt)	George Robinson	
1953	The Heart of the Matter	Ali	
1955	Simba	Karanja	
1955	La grande speranza	Johnny Brown, POW	
1955	The Woman for Joe	Lemmie	
1955	Dollars for Sale	Earl Rutters	
1956	Safari	Jeroge (Njoroge)	
1956	Odongo	Hassan	
1957	The Heart Within	Victor Conway	
1957	The Mark of the Hawk	Prosecutor	
1959	Sapphire	Dr. Robbins	
1959	Killers of Kilimanjaro	Witchdoctor	
1960	Tarzan the Magnificent	Tate	
1960	No Kidding (or Beware of Children)	Black father	
1961	Flame in the Streets	Gabriel Gomez	
1962	Term of Trial	Chard	
1963	Tarzan's Three Challenges	Mang	
1964	Guns at Batasi	Captain Abraham	
1965	Thunderball	Pinder	
1966	Doctor Who	Glyn Williams	Serial: The Tenth Planet
1966	The Sandwich Man	Bus conductor	
1967	Battle Beneath the Earth	Sgt. Seth Hawkins	
1968	Two a Penny	Verger	
1969	Two Gentlemen Sharing	Charles Marriott, Jane's step-father	
1971	The Revolutionary	Speaker	
1973	Scorpio	Black employee in toilet	
1973	A Warm December	Ambassador George Oswandu	
1977	Mohammad, Messenger of God	Annajashi	
1979	Cuba	Col. Rosell Leyva	
1996	Neverwhere	The Abbott	
1998	Déjà Vu	Doctor	
1998	Hiekkamorsian (or Sand Bride)	Rui (voice)	
2001	Revelation	Cardinal Chisamba	
2005	The Interpreter	Edmond Zuwanie	
2006	The Queen	Portrait artist	
2010	Inception	Elderly bald man	
2013	Up on the Roof	Grandad	
