= Flame in the Streets =

1961 British film by Roy Ward Baker

- Directed by: Roy Ward Baker (as Roy Baker)
- Written by: Ted Willis
- Produced by: Roy Ward Baker (as Roy Baker)
- Starring: John Mills; Sylvia Syms; Brenda De Banzie
- Cinematography: Christopher Challis
- Edited by: Roger Cherrill
- Music by: Philip Green
- Distributed by: J. Arthur Rank Film Distributors (UK)
- Release dates: 22 June 1961 (UK); 12 September 1962 (US)
- Running time: 93 mins
- Country: United Kingdom
- Language: English

Flame in the Streets is a 1961 British film directed by Roy Ward Baker and starring John Mills and Sylvia Syms. The screenplay was by Ted Willis based on his 1958 play Hot Summer Night and was novelised by John Burke for Four Square Books. The film was made in CinemaScope.

The film depicts an interracial romance in post-war Britain, and a street brawl taking place during Guy Fawkes Night (5 November).

== Synopsis ==
Racial tensions manifest themselves at home, work and on the streets during Bonfire Night, with racism and violence directed against the burgeoning West Indian community of post-war Britain. Trade union leader Jacko Palmer fights for the rights of a Black worker but struggles with the news that his own daughter, Kathie, is planning to marry a West Indian, much against his own logic and the hysterical racism of his wife Nell.

== Cast ==
- John Mills as Jacko Palmer
- Sylvia Syms as Kathie Palmer
- Brenda De Banzie as Nell Palmer
- Earl Cameron as Gabriel Gomez
- Johnny Sekka as Peter Lincoln
- Ann Lynn as Judy Gomez
- Wilfrid Brambell as Mr. Palmer senior
- Meredith Edwards as Harry Mitchell
- Newton Blick as Visser
- Glyn Houston as Hugh Davies
- Michael Wynne as Les
- Dan Jackson as Jubilee
- Cyril Chamberlain as Dowell
- Gretchen Franklin as Mrs. Bingham
- Harry Baird as Billy

== Production ==
Flame in the Streets was produced at Pinewood Studios by the Rank Organisation, with Willis moving the action from the "hot summer night" of his original play to Guy Fawkes Night. Filming began on 5 November 1960. The new title recalled Willis's earlier play No Trees in the Street, which had itself been filmed two years before. Willis also added two characters, Gabriel Gomez and Harry Mitchell, who are only referred to in the play, and opened out the action to include a nocturnal street brawl in the final reel.

It was one of a number of "girlfriend" parts Syms played around this time.

Baker says the title was changed from Hot Summer Nights because they shot it in Winter.

Baker said "the theme was a bit corny, about the white girl who falls in love with the black man. I thought we did rather well with it actually. But there again it wasn’t really a popular picture because nobody wanted to know. You see it wasn’t a comic in any way. If you make a picture about blacks and whites, there’s got to be something more controversial about it, and there wasn’t really anything in it that was seriously going to provoke an audience into an attitude." The movie marked the end of his contract with Rank.

In his autobiography, The Director's Cut (2000), Roy Ward Baker noted that the film had recently been shown at a Brixton cinema "to mark the 50th anniversary of the arrival in Britain of the steamer Windrush, bringing Caribbeans to work here. ... Some of the older ones [in the audience] testified that it was a true picture of the conditions the incomers faced and in some areas still do face."

== Release ==
Flame in the Streets opened in London on 22 June 1961, with general release following on 9 July.

== Reception ==
Daily Herald critic Paul Dehn called it a "terrifying and ferocious film".

Variety wrote: "John Mills makes a convincing figure as the father who has neglected his family because of his dedication to union work. Brenda de Banzie, his wife, bitter and intolerant about colored people, has two telling scenes, one with her husband and one with her daughter. Sylvia Syms, the schoolmistress daughter who outrages her parents by her determination to marry a young Negro schoolteacher, contributes a neat performance in a role which is not developed fully. ... The fact that Flame in the Streets is derived from a play Hot Summer Night is always obvious. However, by staging the film on Guy Fawkes’ Night, the director is able to get his cameras out into well-filled streets for atmosphere. The street riot between the two factions is curiously anticlimactic, mainly because the film’s appeal is largely the quietness of its direction and playing."

In The Spectator Isabel Quigley observed that "its impact is mild" while conceding that "the obvious visual comparison between the outward and inward flames and fireworks" was effectively handled.

Filmink argued the movie "has the Willis virtues (tidy structure, a social point) and deficiencies (no one feels like a real person, the female roles are dire). Its heart is in the right place, some scenes retain their power, and the issues are still relevant. Good on Rank for making it, in colour and CinemaScope and at least it gives black actors something to play. The public didn’t like it much, though – mostly because it was dull."

== Accolades ==
Willis's script was nominated for a 'Best British Screenplay' BAFTA award.
