= Two Gentlemen Sharing =

1969 American-British film by Ted Kotcheff

- Directed by: Ted Kotcheff
- Screenplay by: Evan Jones
- Based on: Two Gentlemen Sharing by David Stuart Leslie
- Produced by: J. Barry Kulick
- Starring: Robin Phillips; Judy Geeson; Esther Anderson
- Cinematography: Billy Williams
- Edited by: Derek York
- Music by: Stanley Myers
- Production company: Epstein-Kulick Productions
- Distributed by: Anglo-Amalgamated Film Distributors (UK); American International Pictures (US)
- Release dates: 17 September 1969 (New York, US)
- Running time: 105 minutes
- Countries: United Kingdom; United States
- Language: English
- Budget: £380,000

Two Gentlemen Sharing is a 1969 American-British drama film directed by Ted Kotcheff, starring Robin Phillips, Judy Geeson, Esther Anderson, Hal Frederick, Norman Rossington and Rachel Kempson. It was written by Evan Jones based on the 1963 novel of the same name by David Stuart Leslie.

Ted Kotcheff called it "the best film of what you might call my British period" and felt "it had a negative statement. It said that whites and blacks can't get along, mainly because we have too many misunderstandings, too many illusions and myths about each other." He felt this hurt it commercially as "people wanted an upbeat statement about the brotherhood of man."

The film was not theatrically released in the UK.

== Plot ==
An upper-class white Englishman is forced to confront his own feelings and prejudices when the London flat he advertises for sharing is taken up by an Oxford-educated black Jamaican.

== Cast ==
- Robin Phillips as Roddy
- Judy Geeson as Jane
- Esther Anderson as Caroline
- Hal Frederick as Andrew
- Norman Rossington as Phil
- Rachel Kempson as Mrs. Ashby-Kydd
- Ram John Holder as Marcus
- Hilary Dwyer as Ethne
- Daisy Mae Williams as Amanda
- Philip Stone as Ethne's father
- Elspeth March as Ethne's mother
- Avice Landone as Roddy's mother
- David Markham as Roddy's father
- Shelagh Fraser as Jane's mother
- Earl Cameron as Jane's father

== Production ==
The film was one of two movies jointly financed between Paramount and the National Film Finance Corporation, the other being Negatives.

Filming took place from May to June 1968. Garfield Sobers doubled for Hal Frederick in a cricket scene.

According to film critic and historian Alexander Walker, "Differences of opinion began almost as soon as it [the film] was finished, with Paramount insisting that the makers had not delivered the film ‘as scripted,’ and the latter asserting that it was essentially the same, allowing for the ‘inevitable’ changes in shooting due to second and presumably better thoughts, or the reshaping of scenes that did not work."

Jones commented, "I suppose they wanted another Guess Who's Coming to Dinner, a film where white and black go off together into the sunset."

Paramount put the film up for sale. In August 1969 it was announced the film would be distributed in the US by AIP and in Britain by Nat Cohen's Anglo-Amalgamated.

The film was selected for screening at the Venice Film Festival. However it does not appear to have been released in cinemas in Britain.

== Critical reception ==
Variety wrote: "Film boasts a solid and well-chosen cast, strong physical values for such a medium-scaled item, and a racial story [from a novel by David Stuart Leslie] delivered with unhysterical acumen and, at times, with considerable barbed humor."

John Coleman wrote in the New Statesman: "Another stab at that colour problem. ... it was a pleasure to have a couple of laughs. Evan Jones's script is very alert at the beginning, when the posh black comes to share a flat with the posh white.

Boxoffice wrote: "Chosen as the official British entry to the [1969] Venice Film Festival, this J. Barry Kulick productiona strong, adult story for mature audiences. It should click extremely well with art house clientele."

The Radio Times Guide to Films gave the film 2/5 stars, writing: "There are few surprises on offer, but the film is competently acted."
