= The Measure of a Man: A Spiritual Autobiography =

2007 autobiographical work by Sidney Poitier

- 2007 edition cover
- Author: Sidney Poitier
- Language: English
- Subject: Autobiography
- Publisher: HarperSanFrancisco
- Publication date: 2000
- Publication place: United States
- Media type: Print (hardcover)
- ISBN: 0-06-135791-X
- OCLC: 82145181

The Measure of a Man: A Spiritual Autobiography is an autobiographical work by Sidney Poitier, first published in 2000. On January 26, 2007, Oprah Winfrey chose it for her book club.

== Summary ==
In this memoir, Poitier, looks back on his celebrated life and career. He explores elements of character and personal values to take his own measure as a man, as a husband and a father, and as an actor.

Poitier credits his parents and his childhood on tiny Cat Island in the Bahamas for equipping him with the unflinching sense of right and wrong and of self-worth that he has never surrendered and that have dramatically shaped his world. "In the kind of place where I grew up," recalls Poitier, "what's coming at you is the sound of the sea and the smell of the wind and momma's voice and the voice of your dad and the craziness of your brothers and sisters...and that's it." Without television, radio, and material distractions to obscure what matters most, he could enjoy the simple things, endure the long commitments, and find true meaning in his life.

Uncompromising as he pursued a personal and public life, Poitier aimed to honor his upbringing and the invaluable legacy of his parents. Just a few years after his introduction to indoor plumbing and the automobile, Poitier broke racial barrier after racial barrier to launch a pioneering acting career. Committed to the notion that what one does for a living shows who one is, Poitier chose to play forceful and affecting characters who said something positive, useful, and lasting about the human condition. "The true measure of a man is in how he provided for his children" this was one lesson Sidney learnt from his father and held dear to his heart all his life.

The translation in Chinese (ISBN 9570484969) of this autobiography was done by Fongfong Olivia Wei, and published by Triumph Publishing Company in Taipei, Taiwan, in the year 2002.

== Quotes ==
"I have no wish to play the pontificating fool, pretending that I've suddenly come up with the answers to all life's questions. Quite that contrary, I began this book as an exploration, an exercise in self-questing. In other words, I wanted to find out, as I looked back at a long and complicated life, with many twists and turns, how well I've done at measuring up to the values I myself have set."
