= Highgate, Jamaica =

Settlement in Jamaica

Coordinates: 18°19′13″N 76°52′01″W

Location of Highgate in Jamaica

Highgate is a settlement in Jamaica. It has a population of 5,474 as of 2009.
