= Sidney (film) =

2022 documentary film

- Official release poster
- Directed by: Reginald Hudlin
- Written by: Jesse James Miller
- Produced by: Derik Murray; Oprah Winfrey
- Starring: Sidney Poitier
- Cinematography: Matthew Chavez
- Edited by: Tony Kent
- Music by: Marcus Miller
- Production companies: Harpo Productions; Network Entertainment; Hudlin Entertainment
- Distributed by: Apple TV+
- Release dates: September 10, 2022 (TIFF); September 23, 2022 (Apple TV+)
- Running time: 106 minutes
- Country: United States
- Language: English

Sidney is a 2022 American documentary film directed by Reginald Hudlin. The film is a portrait of the life and legacy of actor Sidney Poitier in his final appearance.

== Release ==
The film premiered at the Toronto International Film Festival on September 10, 2022, and was released on Apple TV+ on September 23.

== Reception ==
On review aggregator website Rotten Tomatoes, 90% of 80 critics reviewed the film positively with an average rating of 7.7/10. The website's critics consensus reads, "Sidney might feel a bit standard compared to its trailblazing subject -- but then again, it'd be all but impossible to capture a life this extraordinary in any single film." On Metacritic, the film holds a weighted average score of 70 out of 100, based on 21 critics, indicating "generally favorable reviews".
