= A Warm December =

1973 film by Sidney Poitier

- Directed by: Sidney Poitier
- Written by: Lawrence Roman
- Produced by: Melville Tucker
- Starring: Sidney Poitier; Esther Anderson; Yvette Curtis; Johnny Sekka; George Baker; Earl Cameron
- Cinematography: Paul Beeson
- Edited by: Pembroke J. Herring; Peter Pitt
- Music by: Coleridge-Taylor Perkinson
- Production company: First Artists
- Distributed by: National General Pictures
- Release date: May 23, 1973
- Running time: 101 minutes
- Country: United States
- Language: English
- Budget: $1,641,000
- Box office: $1,600,000 (US/ Canada rentals)

A Warm December is a 1973 American romantic drama film directed by Sidney Poitier and starring him in the lead role as Dr. Matt Younger. It also stars Jamaican actress Esther Anderson as Catherine, Matt's love interest. Anderson's performance as an African princess won her an NAACP Image Award for Best Actress in 1973. The film is also notable for an appearance of Letta Mbulu singing, with an African choir, "Nonqonqo" by Miriam Makeba, a song about South African political prisoners that first appeared on the 1965 album An Evening with Belafonte/Makeba. Coleridge-Taylor Perkinson wrote and conducted the score. The story was influenced by Roman Holiday and Love Story.A Warm December was shot at Pinewood Studios.

== Plot ==
Dr. Matt Younger is a recently widowed American who takes his daughter Stefanie on a month-long vacation in London. While there, he meets Catherine, the niece of African Ambassador George Oswandu. Catherine is involved in negotiations with the Soviet Union to build a vital hydroelectric project in her country. As the pair begin to develop feelings for one another, Dr. Younger learns that the two men following Catherine are not the sinister characters he suspected. One is a bodyguard sent by her uncle, the other is a doctor monitoring the sickle cell disease that will end her life all too soon. She herself says that she is in the December of her life. When Dr. Younger proposes, Catherine must decide between not only love and loyalty to her country, but also seizing the time that remains to her and saddling the man she loves with her inevitable death. In the end, she refuses, thanking him for a "warm December."

== Cast ==
- Sidney Poitier as Dr. Matt Younger
- Esther Anderson as Catherine Oswandu
- Yvette Curtis as Stefanie Younger
- George Baker as Dr. Henry Barlow
- Johnny Sekka as Dr. Joseph Myomo
- Earl Cameron as George Oswandu
- Hilary Crane as Marsha Barlow

== Reception ==
Mia Mask reviewed the film for the Jacob Burns Film Center, calling it a "sensitive and thoughtful film about a dashingly handsome widower who finds true love again."

In Criterion Confessions, Jamie S. Rich disagreed, finding the film lacking in style and calling it a "clunker":

Poitier's direction is completely lacking in style, and for an actor, it's surprising how little eye he seems to have for his cast's performances. Anderson is a nondescript love interest, almost completely lacking in the required mystery or charisma. This looks more like a TV movie than a big-screen effort.

Leonard Maltin gave the film two stars out of four, finding it not excessively sappy, but mediocre.

A contemporary review in the Boston African-American newspaper The Bay State Banner anticipated that A Warm December would not achieve major box office success, attributing this to the film's overwhelmingly positive tone and "dignity" throughout. The reviewer described the film as subtly pro-Pan-Africanist, praising its depiction of Black family life and African aesthetics but noting that the elite background of the main characters presented an aspirational rather than typical family dynamic. Poitier's direction was commended, though the reviewer found his performance as lead "uncreative and not quite satisfying" due to familiar mannerisms, suggesting that another actor might have been more effective in the role, while describing Anderson's performance as impressive. The lack of subtitles or explanation for the Xhosa-language song "Nonqonqo" was strongly criticized, as the reviewer considered its subject matter of South African political prisoners important for viewers to understand. Additional criticisms included the implausible number of Black extras for the London setting and the portrayal of White English characters as uniformly pleasant, which the reviewer judged unrealistic.

== See also ==
- List of American films of 1973
