= Audrey Thomas McCluskey =

American writer and professor

Audrey Thomas McCluskey is an American writer and professor emeriti. She is an alumna of Indiana University, where she was an African-American and African Diaspora Studies professor. McCluskey has received a B.A. magna cum laude from Clark Atlanta University, an M.A. in African Studies from Howard University, and a Ph.D. in Historical and Comparative Education from Indiana University.

McCluskey wrote the book Forgotten Sisterhood about four influential female African American educators in the American South and was interviewed by a National Park Service ranger about her research and books on Mary McLeod Bethune. She has also been an editor for The Devil You Dance With: Film Culture in the New South Africa, a collection of interviews with South African filmmakers, and a writer of articles and book reviews.

She was a panelist in the City of Bloomington, Indiana's "Women of Color in the Workplace" Roundtable Discussion and a guest on WFHB's "Bring It On". She spoke about her book Imaging Blackness: Race and Racial Representation in Film Poster Art at the NMBCC Library's 10th annual Library Evening Extravanza. She reviewed Black Women in the Ivory Tower, 1850-1954: An Intellectual History by Stephanie Y. Evans.

== Writings ==
- “Mary McLeod Bethune and the Education of Black Girls in the South, 1904–1923”, Ph.D. dissertation, Indiana University (1991)
- Mary McLeod Bethune: Building a Better World, Essays and selected documents co-edited with Elaine M. Smith Indiana University Press (1999)
- Imaging Blackness: Race And Racial Representation in Film Poster Art (2007)
- Richard Pryor: The Life and Legend of a ‘Crazy’ Black Man (2008)
- The Devil You Dance With; Film Culture in the New South Africa, editor and introduction, University of Illinois Press (2010)
- A Forgotten Sisterhood; Pioneering Black Women Educators and Activists in the Jim Crow South (2014)

== Articles ==
- "Ringing Up a School: Mary McLeod Bethune's Impact on Daytona" Florida Historical Quarterly (1994)
- "We Specialize in the Wholly Impossible": Black Women School Founders and Their Mission" Signs: Journal of Women in Culture and SocietyVolume 22, Number 2
