= Sidney Poitier =

Bahamian-American actor, filmmaker, diplomat and author (1927–2022)

Sidney Poitier KBE
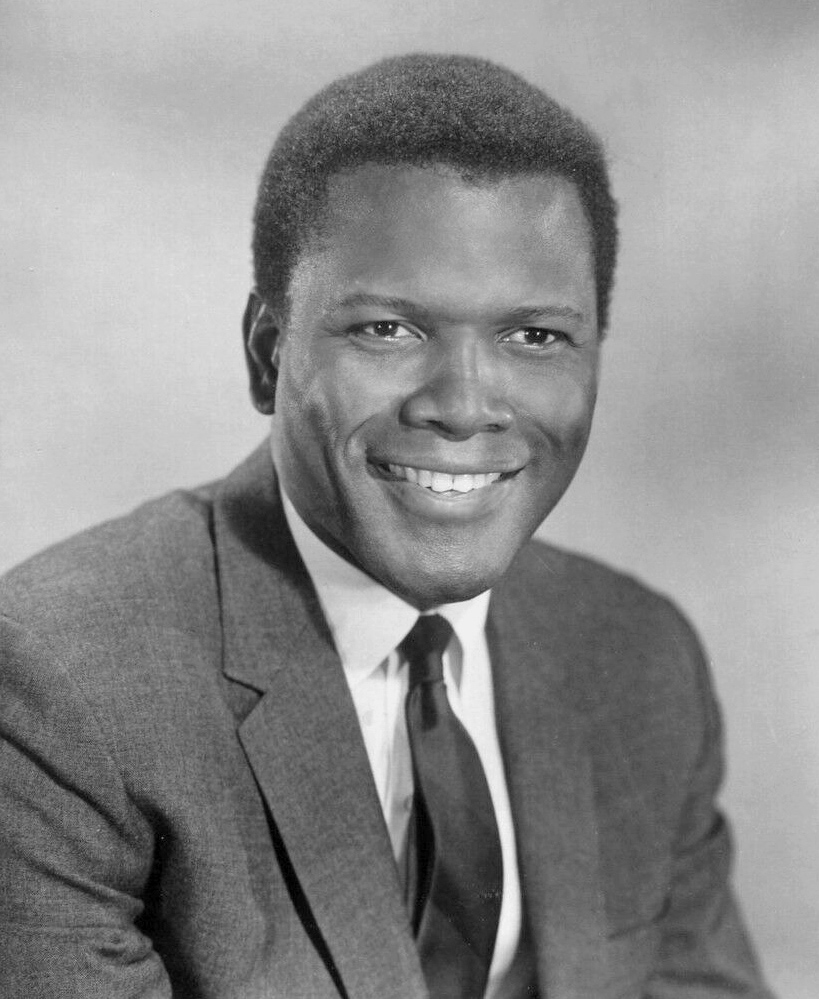
- Poitier in 1968
- Born: February 20, 1927; Miami, Florida, U.S.
- Died: January 6, 2022 (aged 94); Beverly Hills, California, U.S.
- Occupations: Actor; film director; activist; diplomat
- Years active: 1946–2009
- Works: Full list
- Spouses: Juanita Hardy (m. 1950; div. 1965) Joanna Shimkus (m. 1976)
- Partner: Diahann Carroll (1959–1968)
- Children: 6, including Sydney Tamiia
- Awards: Full list

Ambassador of the Bahamas
- 1997–2007: Ambassador to Japan
- 2002–2007: Ambassador to UNESCO
- Military career
- Branch: United States Army
- Service years: 1943–1944
- Conflicts: World War II

Sidney Poitier (/ˈpwɑːtjeɪ/ PWAH-tyay; February 20, 1927 – January 6, 2022) was a Bahamian-American actor, film director, activist, and diplomat. In 1964, he was the first Black male actor and first Bahamian to win the Academy Award for Best Actor. Among his other accolades are two competitive Golden Globe Awards, a BAFTA Award and a Grammy Award, in addition to nominations for two Emmy Awards and a Tony Award. In 1999, he was ranked number 22 among the "American Film Institute's 100 Stars". Poitier was one of the last surviving stars from the Golden Age of Hollywood.

Poitier's family lived in the Bahamas, then still a Crown colony, but he was born in Miami, Florida, while they were visiting, which granted him U.S. citizenship. He grew up in the Bahamas, but moved back to Miami at age 15, and to New York City when he was 16. He joined the American Negro Theatre, gaining his breakthrough film role as a high school student in the film Blackboard Jungle (1955). Poitier gained fame for his leading roles in films such as The Defiant Ones (1958), for which he won the Silver Bear for Best Actor and became the first African American to be nominated for an Academy Award for Best Actor. In 1964, he won the Academy Award and the Golden Globe for Best Actor (Note: James Baskett won an Academy Honorary Award for Song of the South (1946); it was not competitive.) for Lilies of the Field (1963).

Poitier broke ground playing strong leading African American male roles in films such as Porgy and Bess (1959), A Raisin in the Sun (1961), and A Patch of Blue (1965). He acted in three films in 1967, films which addressed race and race relations: To Sir, with Love; Guess Who's Coming to Dinner, and In the Heat of the Night, the latter of which earned him Golden Globe and BAFTA Award nominations. In a poll the next year he was voted the US's top box-office star. Poitier made his directorial film debut with Buck and the Preacher (1972), followed by A Warm December (1973), Uptown Saturday Night (1974), and Stir Crazy (1980). He later starred in Shoot to Kill (1988) and Sneakers (1992).

Poitier was granted an honorary knighthood by Queen Elizabeth II in 1974. His honors include the Golden Globe Cecil B. DeMille Award in 1982, the Kennedy Center Honor in 1995, Screen Actors Guild Life Achievement Award in 1999, and the Honorary Academy Award in 2002. In 2009, he was awarded the Presidential Medal of Freedom by President Barack Obama. In 2016, he was awarded the BAFTA Fellowship for outstanding lifetime achievement in film. From 1997 to 2007, he was the Bahamian Ambassador to Japan.

== Early life ==
Sidney Poitier was born on February 20, 1927, in Miami, Florida. He was the youngest of seven children born to Evelyn (née Outten) and Reginald James Poitier, Afro-Bahamian farmers who owned a farm on Cat Island. The family would travel to Miami to sell tomatoes and other produce to wholesalers. His father also worked as a cab driver in Nassau. Poitier was born unexpectedly in Miami while his parents were there on business; his birth was two months premature, and he was not expected to survive, but his parents remained in Miami for three months to nurse him to health. Poitier grew up in the Bahamas, then a British Crown colony. His birth in the United States entitled him to US citizenship.

Since there were few Poitiers of French ancestry in the Bahamas, some believe that the Poitier ancestors had migrated from Haiti, and were probably among the runaway slaves who established maroon communities throughout the Bahamas, including Cat Island.

Poitier lived with his family on Cat Island until he was ten, when they moved to Nassau. There he was exposed to the modern world, where he saw his first automobile and first experienced electricity, plumbing, refrigeration, and motion pictures. He was raised Catholic but later became an agnostic with views closer to deism.

At age fifteen, in 1942, he was sent back to Miami to live with his brother's large family, but Poitier found it impossible to adjust to the racism in Jim Crow era Florida. At sixteen, he moved to New York City, looking to become an actor, holding a string of jobs as a dishwasher in the meantime. After failing his first audition with the American Negro Theatre due to his inability to fluently read the script, an elderly Jewish waiter sat with him every night for several months, helping him to improve his reading by using the newspaper. During World War II, in November 1943, he lied about his age (he was only 16 at the time) and enlisted in the Army. He was assigned to a Veterans' Administration hospital in Northport, New York, and was trained to work with psychiatric patients. Poitier became upset with how the hospital treated its patients and feigned mental illness to obtain a discharge. Poitier confessed to a psychiatrist that he was faking his condition, but the doctor was sympathetic and granted his discharge under Section VIII of Army regulation 615–360 in December 1944.

After leaving the Army, he worked as a dishwasher until a successful audition landed him a role in an American Negro Theatre production, the same company he failed his first audition with.

== Career ==
=== 1947–1957: Early work and blacklist ===
Poitier joined the American Negro Theater but was rejected by audiences. Contrary to what was expected of negro actors at the time, Poitier's tone deafness made him unable to sing. Determined to refine his acting skills and rid himself of his noticeable Bahamian accent, he spent the next six months dedicating himself to achieving theatrical success. He modeled his legendary speech pattern after radio personality Norman Brokenshire. On his second attempt at the theater, he was noticed and given a leading role in the Broadway production of Lysistrata, through which, though it ran a failing four days, he received an invitation to understudy for Anna Lucasta. Poitier would later befriend Harry Belafonte at the American Negro Theater.

In 1947, Poitier was a founding member of the Committee for the Negro in the Arts (CNA), an organization whose participants were committed to a left-wing analysis of class and racial exploitation. Among his other CNA-related activities, in the early 1950s he was a Vice Chair of the organization. In 1952, he was one of several narrators in a pageant written by Alice Childress and Lorraine Hansberry for the Negro History Festival put on by the leftist Harlem monthly newspaper Freedom.

His participation in such events and CNA generally, along with his friendships with other leftist Black performers, including Canada Lee and Paul Robeson, led to his subsequent blacklisting for a few years. Even associating with Poitier added to the basis for blacklisting Alfred Palca, the writer and producer of one of Poitier's earliest films, the 1954 Go Man Go. Poitier never did sign a loyalty oath, despite being asked in connection with his prospective role in Blackboard Jungle (1955).

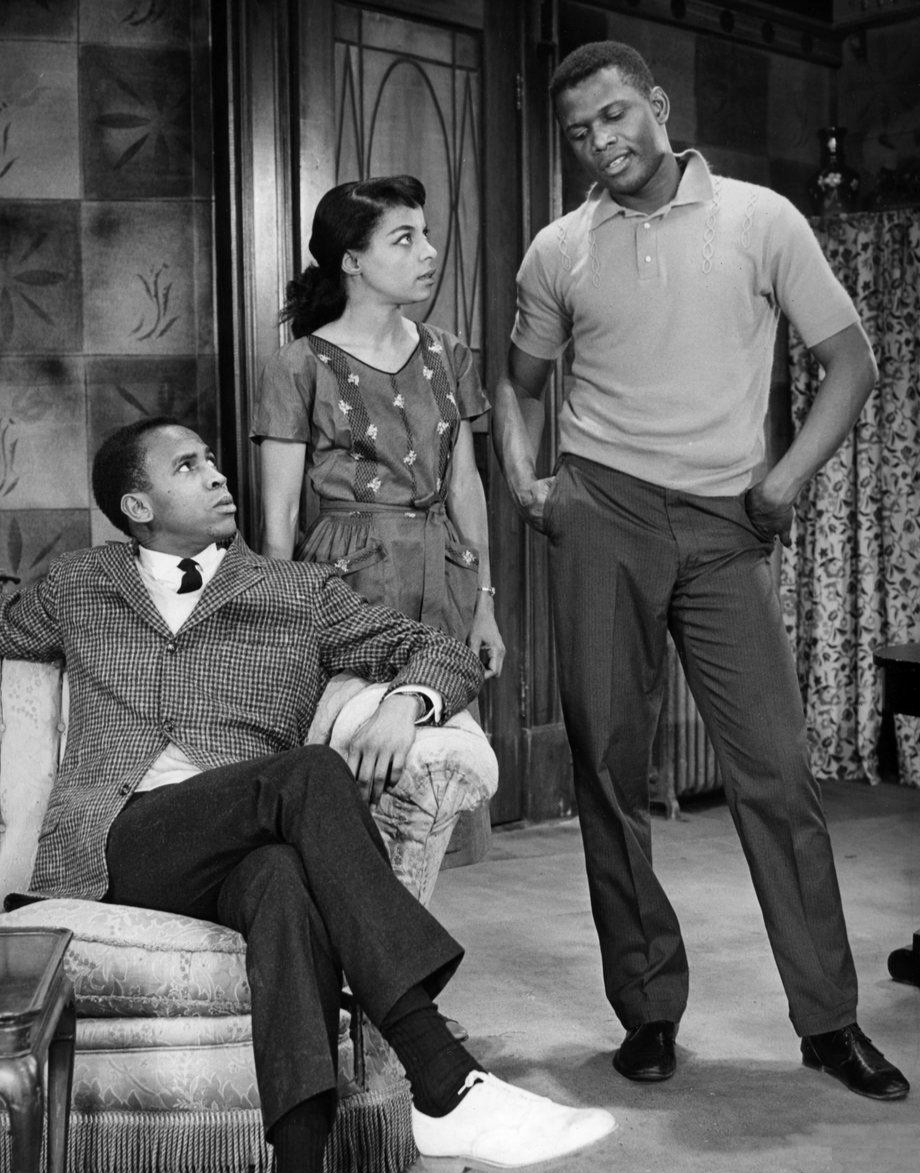
A scene from the play A Raisin in the Sun in 1959, with (from left) Louis Gossett Jr. as George Murchison, Ruby Dee as Ruth Younger, and Poitier as Walter Younger

By late 1949, Poitier had to choose between leading roles on stage and an offer to work for Darryl F. Zanuck in the film No Way Out (1950). His performance with Ruby Dee and Maude Simmons in No Way Out, as a doctor treating a white bigot (played by Richard Widmark, who became a friend), was noticed and led to more roles, each considerably more interesting and more prominent than those most African-American actors of the time were offered. In 1951, he traveled to South Africa with the African-American actor Canada Lee to star in the film version of Cry, the Beloved Country. Poitier's distinction continued in his role as Gregory W. Miller, a member of an incorrigible high-school class in Blackboard Jungle (1955). But it was his performance in Martin Ritt's 1957 film Edge of the City that the industry could not ignore.

Poitier enjoyed working for director William Wellman on Good-bye, My Lady (1956). Wellman was a big name, who had previously directed the famous Roxie Hart (1942) with Ginger Rogers and Magic Town (1947) with James Stewart. What Poitier remembered indelibly was the wonderful humanity in this talented director. Wellman had a sensitivity that Poitier thought was profound, which Wellman felt he needed to hide." Poitier later praised Wellman for inspiring his thoughtful approach to directing when he found himself taking the helm from Joseph Sargent on Buck and the Preacher in 1971.

=== 1958–1969: Breakthrough and stardom ===
In 1958 he starred alongside Tony Curtis in director Stanley Kramer's The Defiant Ones. The film was a critical and commercial success with the performances of both Poitier and Curtis being praised. The film landed eight Academy Award nominations including Best Picture and Best Actor nominations for both stars, making Poitier the first African-American actor to be nominated in a lead role. Poitier did win the British Academy Film Award for Best Foreign Actor.

Poitier acted in the first production of A Raisin in the Sun alongside Ruby Dee on the Broadway stage at the Ethel Barrymore Theatre in 1959. The play was directed by Lloyd Richards. The play introduced details of Black life to the overwhelmingly White Broadway audiences, while director Richards observed that it was the first play to which large numbers of Black people were drawn. The play was a groundbreaking piece of American theater, with Frank Rich, critic from The New York Times, writing in 1983 that A Raisin in the Sun "changed American theater forever". For his performance Poitier earned a Tony Award for Best Actor in a Play nomination. That same year he starred in the film adaptation of Porgy and Bess (1959) with Dorothy Dandridge. For his performance, Poitier received a 1960 Golden Globe Award nomination for Best Actor in a Motion Picture Musical or Comedy.

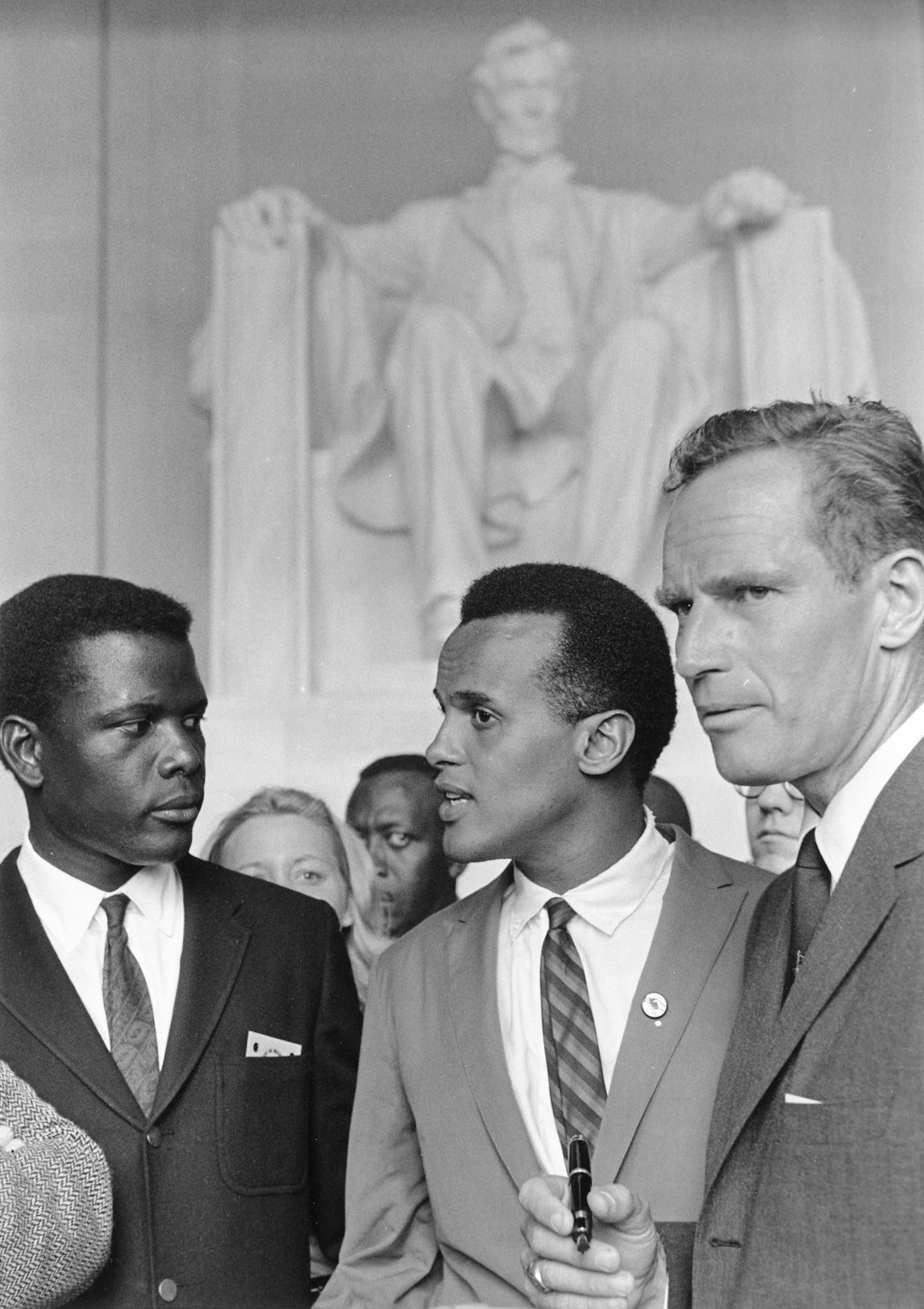
Poitier (left) at the 1963 March on Washington for Jobs and Freedom, alongside actors Harry Belafonte and Charlton Heston

If the fabric of the society were different, I would scream to high heaven to play villains and to deal with different images of Negro life that would be more dimensional . . . But I'll be damned if I do that at this stage of the game. Not when there is only one Negro actor working in films with any degree of consistency . . .

— Sidney Poitier (1967)

In 1961, Poitier starred in the film adaptation of A Raisin in the Sun for which he received another Golden Globe Award nomination. Also in 1961, Poitier starred in Paris Blues alongside Paul Newman, Joanne Woodward, Louis Armstrong, and Diahann Carroll. The film dealt with the American racism of the time by contrasting it with Paris's open acceptance of Black people. In 1963 he starred in Lilies of the Field. For this role, he won the Academy Award for Best Actor and became the first African-American to win the award in a leading role. His satisfaction at this honor was undermined by his concerns that this award was more of the industry congratulating itself for having him as a token and it would inhibit him from asking for more substantive considerations afterward. Poitier worked relatively little over the following year; he remained the only major actor of African descent and the roles offered were predominantly typecast as a soft-spoken appeaser.

In 1964, Poitier recorded an album with the composer Fred Katz called Poitier Meets Plato, in which Poitier recites passages from Plato's writings. He also performed in the Cold War drama The Bedford Incident (1965) alongside the film's producer Richard Widmark, the Biblical epic film The Greatest Story Ever Told (1965) alongside Charlton Heston and Max von Sydow, and A Patch of Blue (1965) co-starring Elizabeth Hartman and Shelley Winters.

In 1967, he was the most successful draw at the box office, the commercial peak of his career, with three popular films, To Sir, with Love, and In the Heat of the Night, and Guess Who's Coming to Dinner. Although these three films seemingly shared little similarity, they all, albeit not overtly, dealt with the black and white divide. In To Sir, with Love, Poitier plays a teacher at a secondary school in the East End of London. The film deals with social and racial issues in the inner city school. The film was met with mixed response; however, Poitier was praised for his performance, with the critic from Time writing, "Even the weak moments are saved by Poitier, who invests his role with a subtle warmth."

In Norman Jewison's mystery drama In the Heat of the Night, Poitier played Virgil Tibbs, a police detective from Philadelphia who investigates a murder in the Deep South in Mississippi alongside a cop with racial prejudices played by Rod Steiger. The film was a critical success with Bosley Crowther of The New York Times calling it "the most powerful film I have seen in a long time." Roger Ebert placed it at number ten on his top ten list of 1967 films. Art Murphy of Variety felt that the excellent Poitier and outstanding Steiger performances overcame noteworthy flaws, including an uneven script. Poitier received a Golden Globe Award and British Academy Film Award nomination for his performance.

In Stanley Kramer's social drama Guess Who's Coming to Dinner, Poitier played a man in a relationship with a White woman played by Katharine Houghton. The film revolves around her bringing him to meet with her parents played by Katharine Hepburn and Spencer Tracy. The film was one of the rare films at the time to depict an interracial romance in a positive light, as interracial marriage historically had been illegal in most states of the United States. It was still illegal in 17 states—mostly Southern states—until June 12, 1967, six months before the film was released. The film was a critical and financial success. In his film review, Roger Ebert described Poitier's character as "a noble, rich, intelligent, handsome, ethical medical expert" and that the film "is a magnificent piece of entertainment. It will make you laugh and may even make you cry." To win his role as Dr. Prentice in the film, Poitier had to audition for Tracy and Hepburn at two separate dinner parties.

Poitier began to be criticized for being typecast as over-idealized African-American characters who were not permitted to have any sexuality or personality faults, such as his character in Guess Who's Coming to Dinner. Poitier was aware of this pattern himself but was conflicted on the matter. He wanted more varied roles; but he also felt obliged to set an example with his characters, by challenging old stereotypes, as he was the only major actor of African descent being cast in leading roles in the American film industry at the time. For instance, in 1966, he turned down an opportunity to play the lead in an NBC television production of Othello with that spirit in mind. Despite this, many of the films in which Poitier starred during the 1960s would later be cited as social thrillers by both filmmakers and critics. Such films included For Love of Ivy in which he modifies the over-idealized African American as Jack Parks, a trucking company executive, who also operates an illegal casino.

=== 1970–1989: Transition to directing ===
In the Heat of the Night featured his most successful character, Virgil Tibbs, a Philadelphia, Pennsylvania, detective whose subsequent career was the subject of two sequels: They Call Me Mister Tibbs! (1970) and The Organization (1971).

In 1972, he made his feature film directorial debut, the Western Buck and the Preacher, in which Poitier also starred, alongside Harry Belafonte and Ruby Dee. Poitier replaced the original director, Joseph Sargent. The following year he directed his second feature, the romantic drama A Warm December. Poitier also starred in the film alongside Esther Anderson.

Along with Barbra Streisand and Paul Newman, Poitier formed First Artists Production Company so actors could secure properties and develop movie projects for themselves. Working with First Artists, Poitier directed several financially successful comedy films, including three in which he also starred: Uptown Saturday Night (1974) with Bill Cosby and Harry Belafonte; and Let's Do It Again (1975) and A Piece of the Action (1977), both with Cosby. His most successful comedy was Stir Crazy (1980; not a First Artists production), starring Richard Pryor and Gene Wilder, which for many years was the highest-grossing film directed by a person of African descent.

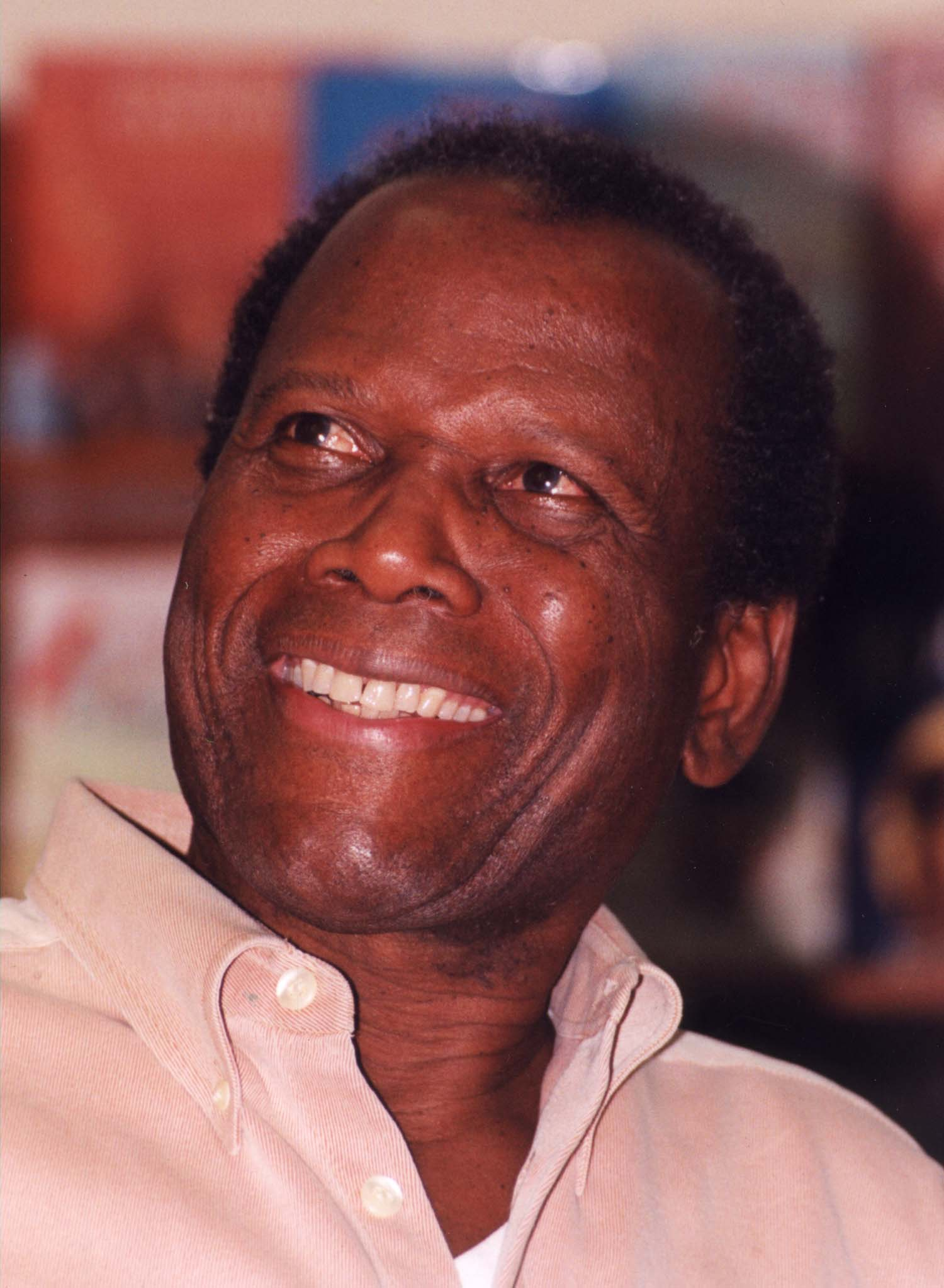
Poitier in 2000

In 1985, he directed Fast Forward and, in 1990, he reunited with Cosby directing him in the family comedy Ghost Dad. In 1988, he starred in Shoot to Kill with Tom Berenger.

=== 1990–2022: Later work ===
In 1992, he starred in Sneakers with Robert Redford and Dan Aykroyd. In 1997, he co-starred in The Jackal with Richard Gere and Bruce Willis.

In the 1990s, he starred in several well received television movies and miniseries such as Separate but Equal (1991), To Sir, with Love II (1996), Mandela and de Klerk (1997), and The Simple Life of Noah Dearborn (1999). He received Emmy nominations for his work in Separate but Equal and Mandela and de Klerk, as well as a Golden Globe nomination for the former. He won a Grammy Award for Best Spoken Word Album in 2001.

In 2002, Poitier received the 2001 Honorary Academy Award for his overall contribution to American cinema. Later in the ceremony, Denzel Washington won the award for Best Actor for his performance in Training Day, becoming the second Black actor to win the award. In his victory speech, Washington saluted Poitier by saying "I'll always be chasing you, Sidney. I'll always be following in your footsteps. There's nothing I would rather do, sir."

With the death of Ernest Borgnine in 2012, Poitier became the oldest living recipient of the Academy Award for Best Actor. On March 2, 2014, Poitier appeared with Angelina Jolie at the 86th Academy Awards to present the Best Director Award. He was given a standing ovation and Jolie thanked him for all his Hollywood contributions, stating: "We are in your debt." Poitier gave a brief speech, telling his peers to "keep up the wonderful work" to warm applause. In 2021, the academy dedicated the lobby of the new Academy Museum of Motion Pictures in Los Angeles as the "Sidney Poitier Grand Lobby" in his honor. Poitier was a lifelong activist for racial and social justice. He declined film roles he considered based on offensive racial stereotypes.

== Board and diplomatic service ==
From 1995 to 2003, Poitier was a member of the board of directors of the Walt Disney Company. In April 1997, Poitier was appointed ambassador from the Bahamas to Japan, a position he held until 2007. From 2002 to 2007, he was concurrently the ambassador of the Bahamas to UNESCO.

== Personal life ==
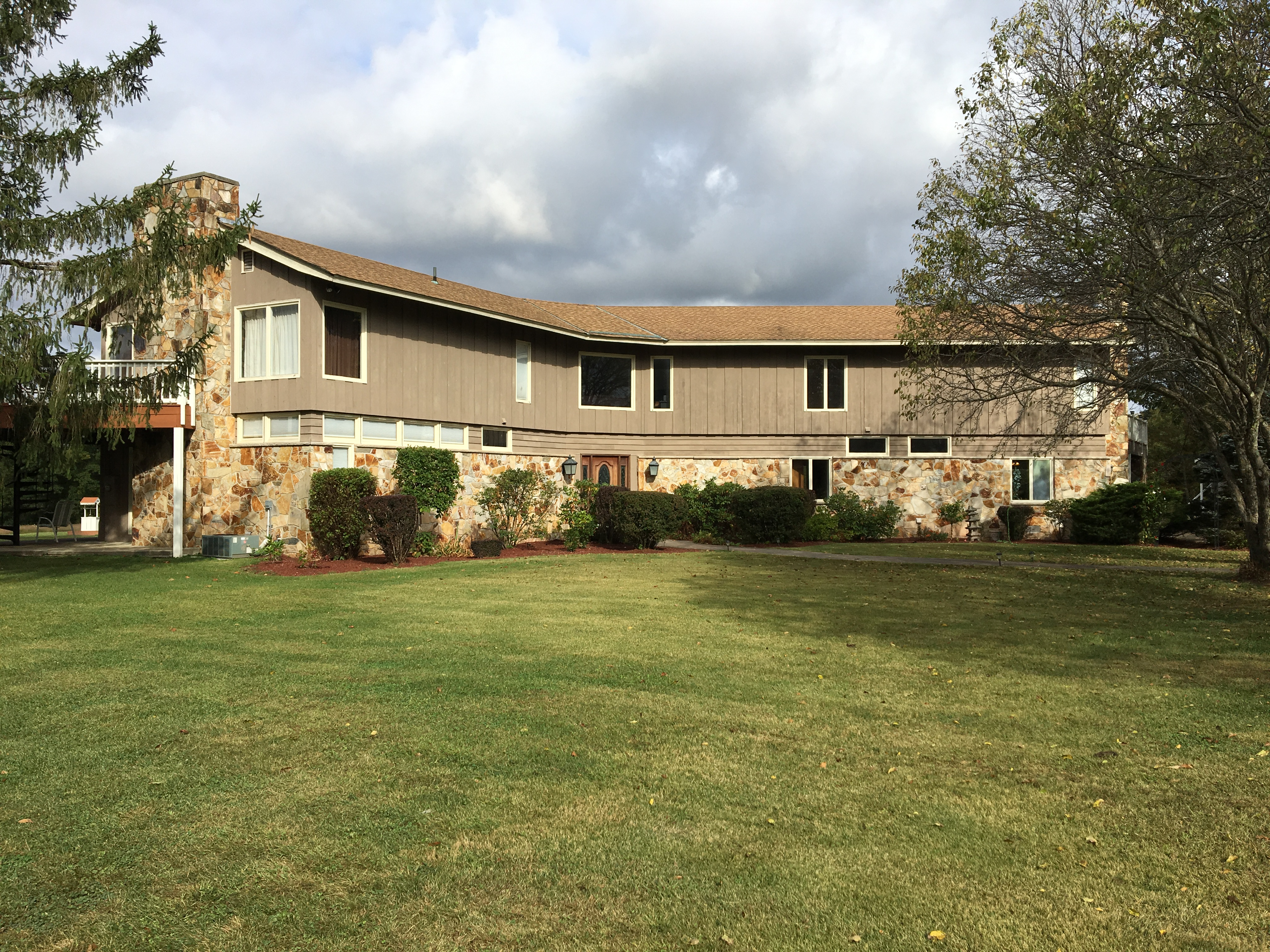
Poitier's house in Stuyvesant, New York, 2019

Poitier was first married to Juanita Hardy from April 29, 1950, until 1965.

Though Poitier became a resident of Mount Vernon in Westchester County, New York, in 1956, they raised their family in Stuyvesant, New York, in a house on the Hudson River.

In 1959, Poitier began a nine-year affair with actress Diahann Carroll.

On January 23, 1976, he married Joanna Shimkus, who starred with Poitier in The Lost Man in 1969, and they remained married until his death.

Poitier had four daughters with his first wife.

He had two daughters with his second wife, including Sydney Tamiia.

Poitier had eight grandchildren and three great-grandchildren.

When Hurricane Dorian hit the Bahamas in September 2019, Poitier's family had 23 missing relatives.

== Death ==
On January 6, 2022, Poitier died at his home in Beverly Hills, California, at the age of 94. His death was confirmed by Fred Mitchell, the Minister of Foreign Affairs of the Bahamas. According to a copy of his death certificate obtained by TMZ, the cause of death was cardiopulmonary failure, with Alzheimer's disease and prostate cancer listed as underlying causes.

Upon Poitier's death, many people released statements honoring him, including President Joe Biden, who wrote in part: "With unflinching grandeur and poise – his singular warmth, depth, and stature on-screen – Sidney helped open the hearts of millions and changed the way America saw itself." Former president Barack Obama paid tribute to Poitier, calling him "a singular talent who epitomized dignity and grace". Michelle Obama, Bill Clinton and Hillary Clinton also released statements.

Many people in the entertainment industry also paid tribute to Poitier, including Martin Scorsese who wrote, "For years, the spotlight was on Sidney Poitier. He had a vocal precision and physical power and grace that at moments seemed almost supernatural." Harry Belafonte, Morgan Freeman, Viola Davis, Whoopi Goldberg, Lupita Nyong'o, Halle Berry, Ava DuVernay, Oprah Winfrey, Octavia Spencer, Jeffrey Wright, Giancarlo Esposito, Quincy Jones, Michael Eisner, Ron Howard and others also paid tribute. Broadway paid tribute when its theaters dimmed their lights on January 19, 2022, at 7:45 pm ET.

The Ebertfest film festival announced it would be dedicating its 2022 event to the memory of Poitier and Gilbert Gottfried.

== Acting credits and accolades ==
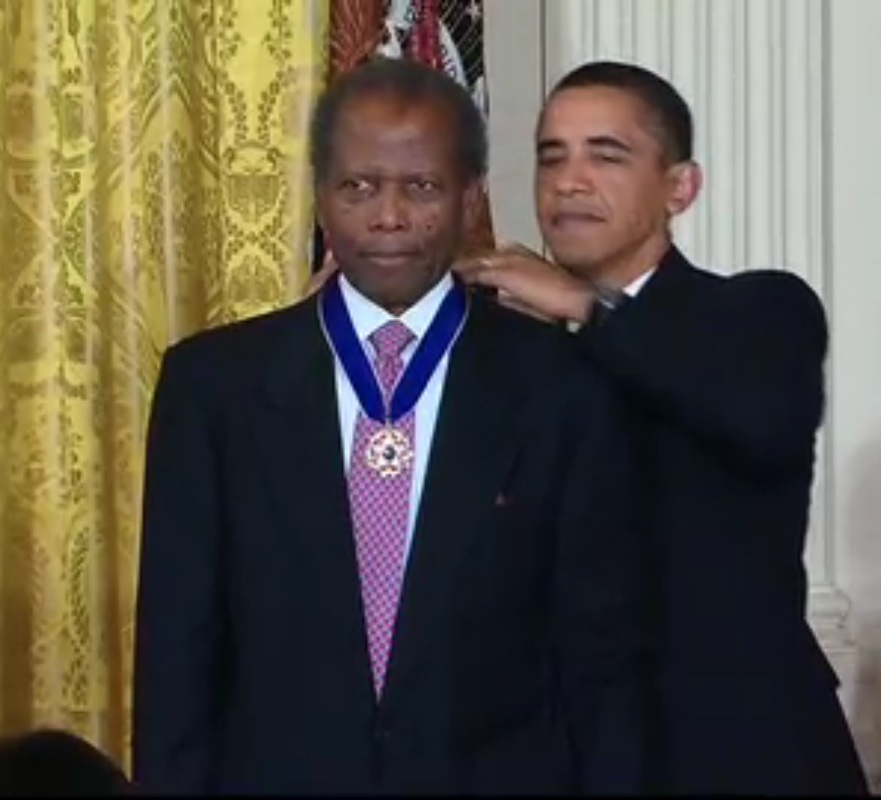
Poitier being awarded the Presidential Medal of Freedom by President Barack Obama in August 2009

Poitier became the first Black actor to win the Academy Award for Best Actor for Lilies of the Field (1963). He also received a Grammy Award, two Golden Globe Awards, and a British Academy Film Award. He received numerous honoraries during his lifetime including the Academy Honorary Award for his lifetime achievement in film in 2002. In 1992, Poitier received the AFI Life Achievement Award. In 1994, Poitier received a star on the Hollywood Walk of Fame. In 1981, he received the Golden Globe Cecil B. DeMille Award and in 2016 he received the BAFTA Fellowship. In 2022, he was inducted into the National Multicultural Western Heritage Museum.

In 1995, he received the Kennedy Center Honor. In 2009, Poitier was awarded the Presidential Medal of Freedom from Barack Obama. He was also named an honorary Knight Commander of the Order of the British Empire by Queen Elizabeth II in 1974. In 1986, he gave the Commencement Address to the University of Miami graduating class and was given the Honorary Degree of Doctor of Fine Arts.

== Legacy ==
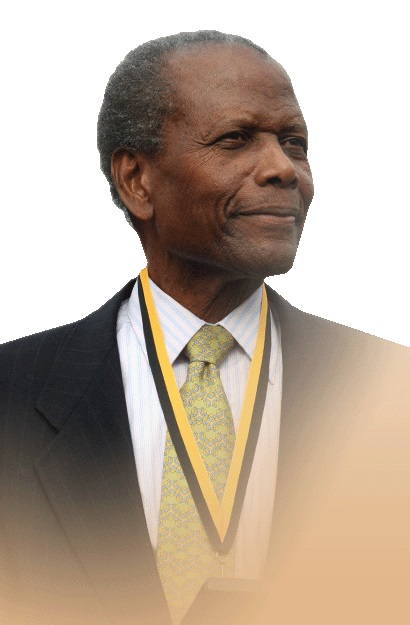
Poitier c. 2013

Poitier was described as an icon in his obituary by USA Today. Laura Jacobs for Vanity Fair hailed Poitier as the "Martin Luther King Jr. of the movies". Several film historians and journalists have called him Hollywood's first African-American film star. The New York Times noted after his death that Poitier was instrumental for the diversity of Hollywood and "paved the way for Black actors in film". The Hollywood Reporter wrote that "Poitier was the first actor to star in mainstream Hollywood movies that depicted a Black man in a non-stereotypical fashion, and his influence, especially during the 1950s and '60s as role model and image-maker, was immeasurable".

While presenting Poitier the Honorary Academy Award in 2002, Denzel Washington said of Poitier: "Before Sidney, African American actors had to take supporting roles in major studio films that were easy to cut out in certain parts of the country. But you couldn't cut Sidney Poitier out of a Sidney Poitier picture". He was an influential African-American actor and highly viewed as such as he became the first Black male actor to be nominated (1958) for an Academy Award (following the nominations of actresses Hattie McDaniel in 1940 and Dorothy Dandridge in 1954) and the first Black male actor to win the award. He was also described as the "sole representative" of African-Americans in mainstream cinema during the 1950s and 1960s, especially during the height of the American Civil Rights movement. The New York Times wrote that Poitier was "an ambassador to white America and a benign emblem of Black power".

For his role in diversifying Hollywood and for his role in paving the way for further Black actors, he was described as one of "the most important figures of 20th century Hollywood". The former US president Barack Obama said Poitier had "[advanced] the nation's dialogue on race and respect" and "opened doors for a generation of actors". Sidney, a documentary film about Poitier's life and legacy by Reginald Hudlin, was released on September 23, 2022.

== Works ==
Poitier wrote three autobiographical books:

- This Life (1980), winner of the Coretta Scott King Award (1981)
- The Measure of a Man: A Spiritual Autobiography (2000)
- Life Beyond Measure: Letters to My Great-Granddaughter (2008)

Two biographies of Poitier have been published:

- Sidney Poitier: Man, Actor, Icon (2004) by historian Aram Goudsouzian.
- Sidney Poitier Black and White: Sidney Poitier's Emergence in the 1960s as a Black Icon (2020) by Philip Powers.

His life has been documented in the visual arts:

- Sidney Poitier: One Bright Light (2000)
- Sidney Poitier, un outsider à Hollywood (2008)
- Sidney (2022)

== See also ==
- List of African-American actors
- African-American Tony nominees and winners — Performance by an Actor in a Leading Role in a Play
- List of black Academy Award winners and nominees — Best Actor in a Leading Role
- List of actors with Academy Award nominations
- List of actors with more than one Academy Award nomination in the acting categories
- List of black Golden Globe Award winners and nominees
- List of Golden Globe winners
- List of honorary British knights and dames
- David Hampton, an impostor who posed as Poitier's son "David" in 1983, which inspired the 1990 play and 1993 film Six Degrees of Separation
- John Stewart, aka Green Lantern, a DC Comics superhero whose original design was based on Poitier
