= Mandela and de Klerk =

- Written by: Richard Wesley
- Directed by: Joseph Sargent
- Starring: Sidney Poitier; Michael Caine
- Music by: Cédric Gradus Samson
- Country of origin: United States
- Original language: English

Production
- Producer: Bernard Sofronski
- Cinematography: Tobias A. Schliessler
- Editors: Debra Karen; Benjamin A. Weissman
- Running time: 114 minutes
- Production company: Showtime Networks

Original release
- Network: Showtime
- Release: February 16, 1997

Mandela and de Klerk is a 1997 made-for-television drama film written by Richard Wesley and directed by Joseph Sargent. The film stars Sidney Poitier and Michael Caine. The film documents the negotiations between F.W. de Klerk and Nelson Mandela to end South African apartheid, and was nominated for numerous awards in 1997 and 1998. It originally premiered on Showtime on February 16, 1997.

== Cast ==
- Sidney Poitier as Nelson Mandela
- Michael Caine as F. W. de Klerk
- Tina Lifford as Winnie Madikizela-Mandela
- Gerry Maritz as P. W. Botha
- Ian Roberts as Kobie Coetsee
- Ben Kruger as James Gregory
- Jerry Mofokeng as Walter Sisulu
- John Carson as Willem de Klerk
- David Fortune as Raymond Mhlaba
- Farouk Valley-Omar as Ahmed Kathrada
- Terry Norton as Marike de Klerk
- Bankole Omotoso as Govan Mbeki
- Andre Jacobs as Niel Barnard
- Sebata Sesiu as Aaron Motsoaledi
- Vuyisile Bojana as Oliver Tambo
- Moshidi Motshegwa as Zindzi Mandela
- Nomonde Gogi as Zenani Mandela-Dlamini
- Lentsoe Mosieleng as Peter Ndlovu
- Kwezi L. L. Kobus as Chris Hani
- Hannes Horn as Quartus de Wet
- Regardt van den Bergh as Magnus Malan
