= Centro Cultural Palacio de La Moneda =

Cultural facility in Chile

Coordinates: 33°26′38″S 70°39′13″W

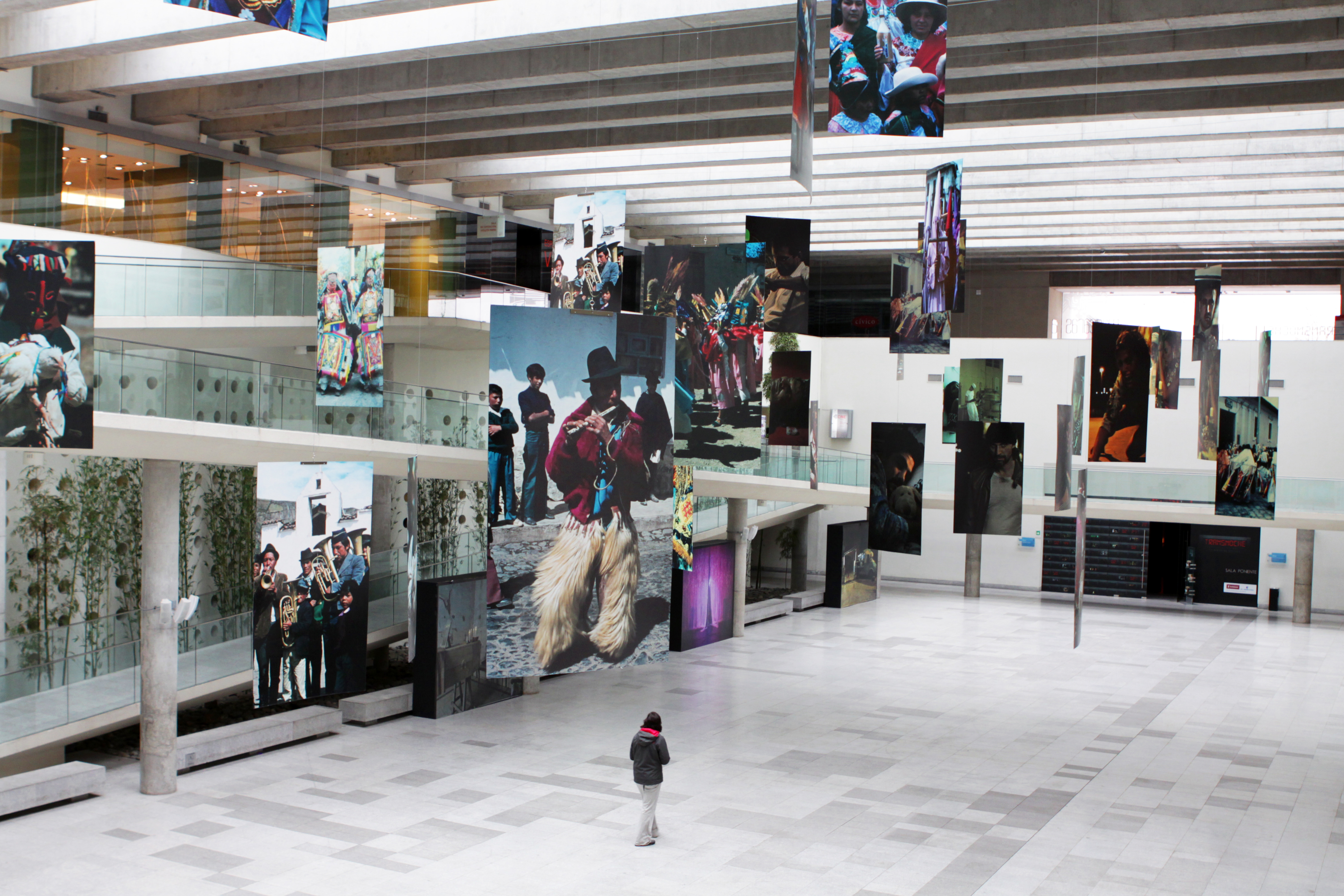
The main lobby

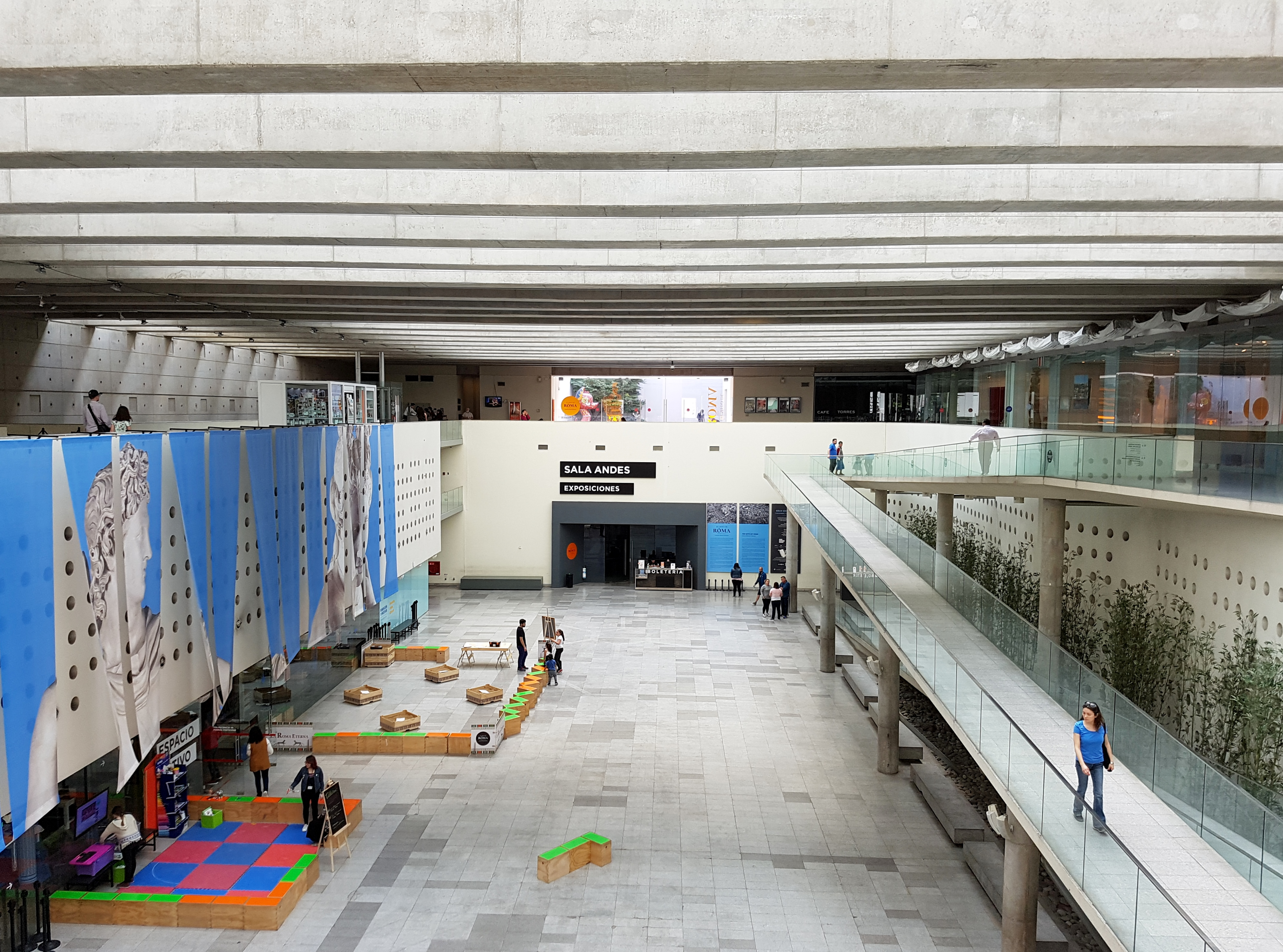
The main lobby

Centro Cultural Palacio de La Moneda ("Palacio de La Moneda Cultural Center") is a cultural facility located in Santiago, Chile, under Plaza de la Ciudadanía, in the southern façade of the Palacio de La Moneda. It is intended to place the Chilean capital in the international cultural circuit, allowing participative and formative access for all citizens to the cultural and audiovisual richness of the nation.

== History ==
It was built between November 2004 and January 2006 and was designed by Chilean architects Cristián Undurraga and Ana Luisa Devés. It contains 7,200 m^{2}, with two main exhibition halls, each 620 m^{2} in area.

This project is part of the bigger Bicentennial Project, in preparation for the 200th anniversary of Chile's Republican Life. As part of this plan, many public buildings, parks, libraries, airports, and boulevards have been built or improved.

This center houses other minor exhibition halls: the Centro de Documentación de las Artes ("Arts Documentation Center", with information and resources concerning modern and contemporary art), Cineteca Nacional ("National Film Archive"). The program for the movie showings at the National Film Archive can be found here. The museum also has a Digital Laboratory (for film restoration and digitalization), Restaurants, Café, and a small Shop. There is a new art and technology exhibition room.

There is a parking garage under the space with room for 564 cars on 4 levels, with pedestrian and vehicular access on Morande Street and Teatinos Street.

The inaugural exhibit (from January to July 2006) is México: del Cuerpo al Cosmos ("Mexico: from Body to Cosmos"), featuring about 200 pieces of ancient Mexican art.
