= Abel-Steinberg-Winant Trio =

The Abel-Steinberg-Winant Trio is a trio, formed in 1984, resident at Mills College, and named for its members; violinist David Abel, pianist Julie Steinberg, and percussionist William Winant. They specialize in new music from the Americas and the Pacific Rim.

They have commissioned and premiered over twenty-five works. They have recordings released on record labels including CRI/New World, and New Albion, as well as Tzadik.

They have performed pieces by composers including Alvin Curran, Peter Garland, Lou Harrison, Lam Bun-Ching, and John Zorn. Also Somei Satoh, John Harbison, Paul Dresher, Frederic Rzewski, Richard Felciano, and John Adams.

== Discography ==
- Chris Brown: Rogue Wave
- Peter Garland: Love Songs
- Frederic Rzewski: New Works
- Alvin Curran: Schtyx
- Abel Steinberg Winant Trio: Set of Five
- Peter Garland: Walk in Beauty
- Lou Harrison: La Koro Sutro, Rhymes with Silver
- Lam Bun-Ching: ...Like Water
- John Zorn: Music for Children
- Paul Dresher: Dark Blue Circumstance

== See also ==
- New York Percussion Trio
- Piano trio
