= Trilogy: An Opera Company =

- Abbreviation: Trilogy: AOC
- Formation: 2004
- Type: NGO
- Headquarters: Newark, New Jersey
- Region served: New Jersey
- Leader: Kevin Maynor
- Website: trilogyaoc.homestead.com

Trilogy: An Opera Company (Trilogy: AOC) is a non-profit opera organization in Newark, New Jersey. Trilogy: AOC aims to produce high art evolving from the compositions and life stories of Black people. It embraces quality and diversity whilst supporting the community of black artists.

== History ==
Trilogy: AOC began in 2004. The inception of Trilogy: An Opera Company followed a conversation between Sharpe James, then Newark mayor and African American opera singer Kevin Maynor. It was to be a cultural gift to the people of the then chronically depressed urban area of Newark, New Jersey. Initially developed as a one-off festival, Trilogy: AOC's success led to the formation of a committee and its continuing productions. Trilogy: an opera company is a 501c3 company. Trilogy: an opera company made its debut at The New Jersey Performing Arts Center on November 23, 2014.

== Composers ==
Trilogy: AOC develops the works of Black composers as well as, for example, Scott Joplin, Michael Raphael, Dorothy Rudd Moore, Charles Lloyd Jr., Adolphus Hailstork, Richard Thompson, Trevor Weston, T. J. Anderson, Anthony Davis, and Julius P. Williams.

== Productions ==
Trilogy: AOC's productions have included "Robeson", "The Mask in the Mirror", The Ballad of James Byrd, Darfur: a Dramatic Cantata, 4 and Nat Turner by Michael Raphael. The cast of Nat Turner included Angela Brown, soprano, and Kevin Maynor, bass. It also included a twenty-two member ballet and an orchestra of African Americans as well as a sixty-member child chorus from Harlem, New York. Nat Turner was conducted by Jeffrey Fairweather, directed by Amiri Baraka, with Adrienne Armstrong choreographing and Chantal Wright was the chorus master. Many of the premieres were conducted by Julius Penson Williams, Resident Conductor/Music Director.

In 2016 Trilogy: AOC presented the premiere of an opera called Five, by Anthony Davis with libretto by Richard Wesley. The work was later made smaller with less characters still a two-act opera called The Central Park Five, which premiered at the Long Beach Opera in 2019 and won the Pulitzer Prize for Music in 2020.

== Supporters ==
Supporters of Trilogy: AOC have included: The Starry Night Fund; The Lambent Foundation; Geraldine R. Dodge Foundation; PNC Bank; City National Bank, Investors Bank; The Prudential Foundation, The Puffin Foundation, The Modell Foundation; Pfizer and The Victoria Foundation.
