= The Central Park Five (opera) =

2019 opera by Anthony Davis and Richard Wesley

- Opera by Anthony Davis
- Librettist: Richard Wesley
- Language: English
- Based on: Central Park jogger case
- Premiere: 15 June 2019; Long Beach Opera

The Central Park Five is a two-act American opera composed by Anthony Davis with libretto by Richard Wesley. It premiered on June 15, 2019, at the Long Beach Opera Company in California. The premiere was directed by Andreas Mitisek and conducted by Leslie Dunner. Davis was awarded the Pulitzer Prize for Music for the opera on May 4, 2020. An earlier, shorter version, titled Five, was premiered in Newark, New Jersey, in 2016 by the Trilogy Company. A staged concert production has been announced by New York City Opera; the date has not been set.

== Summary ==
The opera is based on the 1989 incident in which a woman was raped and beaten and eight other people injured in New York's Central Park. Five African-American and Latino teenagers were convicted of rape, sodomy, assault, robbery, and riot. They served years in prison but were ultimately exonerated. The opera's large cast includes the five teenagers; five of their parents; Matias Reyes, the serial rapist ultimately proven to be the actual perpetrator; the prosecutor; a generic detective referred to as "The Masque"; and even Donald Trump, then a New York real estate developer, who published multiple full-page newspaper advertisements calling for the return of the death penalty.

== Roles ==
Role	Voice type	Premiere cast, June 15, 2019 (conductor: Leslie Dunner)
Antron McCray	bass-baritone	Derrell Acon
Yusef Salaam	bass-baritone	Cedric Berry
Kevin Richardson	tenor	Bernard Holcomb
Korey Wise	tenor	Nathan Granner
Raymond Santana	tenor	Orson Van Gay
Donald Trump	tenor	Thomas Segen
District Attorney	mezzo-soprano	Jessica Mamey
The Masque	baritone	Zeffin Quinn Hollis
Raymond's Father and Matias Reyes	bass-baritone	Babatunde Akinboboye
Antron's Father	tenor	Ashley Faatoalia
Antron's Mother and Kevin's mother	soprano	Joelle Lamarre
Yusef's Mother	mezzo-soprano	Lindsay Patterson

== Reaction ==
Mark Swed of the Los Angeles Times said the premiere production offered "musical excellence, with a strong cast, an orchestra that could cook and viscerally stunning conducting from Leslie Dunner". He added that the acting provided "moments of intense drama" and the "supercharged" score created "tension, terror, dismay and, in the most revealing moments, tenderness and hope".

Gordon Williams, writing for Opera Wire, called it "an incredibly effective presentation" of "a powerful work that shines a spotlight on an important event", describing it an ensemble piece with a powerful libretto and a strong cast.

== Accolades ==
The Pulitzer Prize committee cited the work as "a courageous operatic work, marked by powerful vocal writing and sensitive orchestration, that skillfully transforms a notorious example of contemporary injustice into something empathetic and hopeful".

Composer Davis commented, "I'm excited, thrilled and honored that this work has been recognized this way," adding "it’s exciting for me that you can create political work that has an impact and speak to issues in our society. I’ve done my career creating political works, and I never thought I would ever get a Pulitzer."

The recording by Long Beach Opera in 2022 was released commercially in August 2026. It was nominated for Best Opera Recording by the Recording Academy for the 69th Annual Grammy Awards in 2027.
