= Let's Do It Again (1975 film) =

1975 film by Sidney Poitier

- Theatrical release poster by Jack Rickard
- Directed by: Sidney Poitier
- Screenplay by: Richard Wesley
- Story by: Timothy March
- Produced by: Melville Tucker
- Starring: Sidney Poitier; Bill Cosby; Calvin Lockhart; John Amos; Julius Harris; Denise Nicholas; Lee Chamberlin; Mel Stewart; Jimmie Walker; Ossie Davis
- Cinematography: Donald M. Morgan
- Edited by: Pembroke J. Herring
- Music by: Curtis Mayfield
- Color process: Technicolor
- Production companies: First Artists; Verdon Productions Limited
- Distributed by: Warner Bros. Pictures
- Release date: October 11, 1975
- Running time: 113 minutes
- Country: United States
- Language: English
- Box office: $11.8 million (rentals)

Let's Do It Again is a 1975 American action crime comedy film, starring Sidney Poitier and co-starring Bill Cosby and Jimmie Walker among an all-star black cast. The film, directed by Poitier, is about blue-collar workers who decide to rig a boxing match to raise money for their fraternal lodge. The song of the same name by The Staple Singers was featured as the opening and ending theme of the film, and as a result, the two have become commonly associated with each other. The production companies include Verdon Productions and The First Artists Production Company, Ltd., and distributed by Warner Bros. Pictures. The movie was filmed in two cities, Atlanta, Georgia and New Orleans, Louisiana, where most of the plot takes place. This was the second film pairing of Poitier and Cosby following Uptown Saturday Night, and followed by A Piece of the Action (1977). Of the three, Let's Do It Again has been the most successful both critically and commercially. Calvin Lockhart and Lee Chamberlin also appeared in Uptown Saturday Night. According to the American Film Institute, Let's Do It Again is not a sequel to Uptown Saturday Night.

== Plot ==
Two friends, Billy Foster and Clyde Williams, need to quickly find a way to raise funds for their fraternal lodge, the Sons and Daughters of Shaka. It is incumbent on Billy to find the money because he is the treasurer of the struggling lodge. After Billy convinces Clyde that it is their best and quickest option, they decide to bring back a successful money-making scheme: Clyde's special ability of hypnosis (which he states that he learned during his time as a medic in the Army) allows the two to set up boxing matches and then maximize profits by going all in on the underdog. Billy and Clyde take their talents to New Orleans along with their wives, Beth and Dee Dee, to rig a boxing match; the competitor they are interested in is Bootney Farnsworth, a scrawny underdog boxer who is overwhelmed in the initial sparring matches. His difficulty to impress anyone, even his coach, makes the odds of him winning lower by the day.

After watching Bootney struggle, Billy and Clyde sneak into Bootney's hotel room and hypnotize him into thinking he is a strong fighter who cannot be beaten. They use what is left of the lodge's budget to place their bets with two rival gangsters: the established Kansas City Mack, and the newcomer Biggie Smalls. The hypnotized Bootney is transformed into a boxing phenomenon and easily defeats the champion, 40th Street Black, by KO. After the match, Clyde de-hypnotizes Bootney, before returning to Atlanta with Billy and their wives.

Sometime after receiving the money from Clyde and Billy, the lodge throws a celebration dinner, with Elder Johnson announcing the uses the funds are being put to, including the beginnings of a nursery school for the children of lodge members (though they are still short on some funds for it). During the celebration dinner, Billy and Clyde receive a visit from Kansas City Mack, who deduced that they had somehow rigged the fight, and had spent weeks searching for the two men. He makes a deal that would allow the two sides to be even: he informs Billy and Clyde that they must perform exactly the same hypnosis again on Bootney, but this time they must de-hypnotize him before his rematch with 40th Street Black. Mack explains that the non-hypnotized Bootney has reverted to his previous weaker self. He says that when the public sees Bootney back to his tougher self again during sparring and training sessions, they will place bets on him, which Mack will cover; then, when Bootney is de-hypnotized, 40th Street Black will easily defeat him, and Mack will keep the money from the bets that were placed. Billy and Clyde agree to the deal (under threat of violence), and perform the initial hypnosis again on Bootney; however, Bootney has become far too quick for Clyde to keep up with during his training sessions, and he cannot dehypnotize him. In desperation, Clyde and Billy sneak into Bootney's hotel room through an open window, but are caught by Bootney's trainers, and arrested. After Clyde hypnotizes Lt. Bottomley of the New Orleans police department into releasing them, he comes up with a plan: using Beth and Dee Dee, who will not be recognized, they will place bets of $5000, at 20 to 1 odds for a first-round draw, with both Mack and Smalls. Both gangsters agree to the bets, as the odds of the bet are in their favor. Clyde then disguises himself as a maintenance man to sneak into 40th Street Black's locker room before the fight, and hypnotize him in the same manner as Bootney. During the first round, both Bootney and 40th Street Black simultaneously land knockout punches on each other, and the referee counts both men out at the same time, declaring the match a draw.

Following this outcome, Billy and Clyde are nowhere to be found. Realizing that he stands to lose $100,000, Mack tries to intercept Dee Dee (who placed her bet with one of Mack's bookies), but misses her after she has collected the money and departed with Clyde. Mack realizes that Smalls must have also been taken in by the same scheme, and tries to call him but to no avail, as Billy has bribed the telephone operator at Smalls' hotel to intercept his calls. Meanwhile, Beth goes to collect her $100,000 winnings from Smalls, during which Billy pretends to be the head of "the Syndicate" in Chicago, when Smalls initially refuses to pay. Mack and his crew rush over to Smalls' hotel, again missing their target after the winnings have been collected. After sending Beth and Dee Dee away with the money, Billy and Clyde lead Mack, Smalls, and their combined crews on a chase through apartment buildings, which ends up at the local police department where Clyde and Billy had previously been detained. Here, Billy advises Smalls and Mack to go along with what he is about to say; he then proceeds to tell a story about how both gangsters had eagerly rushed into the police department to donate money to the police youth community center fund (which Bottomley had been loudly complaining about prior to meeting Billy and Clyde). Clyde then proceeds to hand $20,000 in cash to Bottomley, saying both Smalls and Mack were each donating $10,000 (as well as taking another $5,000 from both gangsters for a donation to their Atlanta nursery school fund), before returning the rest of the money to both Smalls and Mack. Though Mack initially threatens to still get Billy and Clyde, Clyde informs both Mack and Smalls that he has a letter locked in Bottomley's safe with evidence of all their dealings; Bottomley adds that if he ever hears they have harassed Billy and Clyde or if the two come up missing, both Mack and Smalls will be thrown in jail for a very long time, ending with admonishing both the gangsters to leave New Orleans. Billy, Clyde, Beth and Dee Dee drive back home to Atlanta. Billy jokes that they should rig a fight involving heavyweight champion, Muhammad Ali and entertainer Sammy Davis Jr.

== Cast ==
- Sidney Poitier as Clyde Williams
- Bill Cosby as Billy Foster
- Calvin Lockhart as Hiawatha "Biggie" Smalls
- John Amos as MacArthur "Kansas City Mack" Clutch
- Jimmie Walker as "Bootney" Farnsworth
- Ossie Davis as Elder Johnson
- Denise Nicholas as Beth Foster
- Lee Chamberlin as Dee Dee Williams
- Mel Stewart as Ellison
- Julius Harris as "Bubbletop" Woodson
- Billy Eckstine as Zack
- Paul Harris as Jody Tipps
- Jophery Brown as Bootney Farnsworth's Trainer
- Rodolphus Lee Hayden as 40th Street Black
- Morgan Roberts as Fish N Chips Freddie

When the film premiered, John Amos and Jimmie Walker were starring as father and son in the CBS sitcom Good Times. George Foreman makes a cameo appearance as a factory worker who challenges Billy to a fight in the beginning of the film. Jayne Kennedy also makes a cameo during the opening credits as the beautiful Girl at the Factory that Billy is looking at when he crashes his forklift.

== Background ==
The film's writer, Richard Wesley, also wrote the first film that featured Cosby and Poitier as co-stars, Uptown Saturday Night. Wesley's repertoire includes a range of black power films and plays. Wesley is responsible for a 1971 play Black Terror, which portrayed the story of a black revolution that was to take place in "the very near future" and a 1989 play The Talented Tenth which takes its name from W. E. B. Du Bois's article, "The Talented Tenth". Like Wesley, the film's producer, Melville Tucker, too worked on Uptown Saturday Night. Tucker worked with Poitier prior to both films as well in The Lost Man (1969). The Lost Man is black power film about group of black militants that hatch a plan to finance their "revolutionary struggle". In order to succeed in this mission, the group conspires to rob a factory.

The DVD contains a commentary feature that includes Richard Wesley and New York Press film critic Armond White. Wesley mentions that the film was important to Poitier's image. The film allowed Poitier to expand his now "distant" image and answer criticism from black militants and the younger generation. Working with younger actors, like Jimmie Walker, was an important factor in widening Poitier's audience. Jimmie Walker's character welcomed Poitier to "new black humor". Wesley also mentions that Bill Cosby and Sidney Poitier were not the original lead actors he had in mind when writing the script. Instead, he thought of casting Richard Pryor and Redd Foxx. This did not come to fruition, as Warner Bros. Pictures wanted actors more known to mainstream America. Pryor and Foxx had some success but Poitier was seen as a more viable lead actor. In the end, Wesley was pleased with the actors that lead the film, because Poitier and Cosby worked so well together. Wesley points out that the friendship off-screen translated to the film. Though, Poitier and Cosby had two very different acting styles, their chemistry was what boosted the script. Cosby and Poitier were joined by other actors that worked together previously. John Amos, Jimmie Walker, and Mel Stewart had all worked with an actor, producer or director prior to Let's Do It Again.

== Themes ==
The attire in the film resembles much of what is seen in the blaxploitation era. In the DVD's commentary, film critic Armond White points out that the suits were worn by Kansas City Mack and co. to parody blaxploitation. Extravagant, if not gaudy, suits and gold jewelry are blaxploitation staples. White also mentions that Bill Cosby satirizes the attire of blaxploitation in just one scene. Cosby wears a flamboyant red and pink suit in an attempt to impress prominent bookmaker Kansas City Mack (John Amos). Writer Chris Laverty went into more detail about clothing and their importance in a journal for Arts Illustrated: "In a sense it was social progression, the essence of the self-made man; readable entirely by what he wears. Narrative was indirectly powered by the coveting of clothes as visual representation of having 'made it'". It is also worth noting that Mack's entourage has either relaxed hair or a shaved head. Afros are not often seen on the heads of elite African-American businessmen. Afros are blaxploitation staples and is seen on the head of Bill Cosby, while Sidney Poitier has a lower cut.

The role of women in the film was a priority of Wesley. In the film's commentary, he admitted that women were "underutilized" in Uptown Saturday Night. In Let's Do it Again, the significant others of Billy and Clyde are more visible throughout the movie and play a larger role in the denouement of the film. Women are more visible in their relations to other characters as well. Wesley points out that an antagonist, Biggie Smalls, has a female head honcho. Mature relationships between black men and women that may have been "soured" by the time was another reason for Wesley increasing the role of women in the film. Richard wanted to improve the image of black community. To him, this improvement began in the portrayal of the household. Let's Do It Again came at when films that starred powerful, black female leads, such as Coffy and Foxy Brown, were being released. Wesley decided to take a different route and use black, female characters as companions to male leads.

Self-determination is another theme present in the film. The film showed characters taking charge of their own lives. This idea that each individual controls their own life is another common theme in the Black Power movement and was central to lectures by Black Power leaders such as Malcolm X and Martin Luther King Jr.

== Soundtrack ==
The soundtrack to the film was put together by world-renowned musician Curtis Mayfield. Mayfield, also responsible for the highly-successful soundtrack in Super Fly (1972), wrote the music and The Staple Singers performed the songs. The title track for this movie entitled, "Let's Do It Again", was a number one hit on both the R&B and Pop charts. Wesley credited much of the film's success to the success of the song, which was released prior to the film's debut. The music also resembles much of what is seen in blaxploitation. Upbeat funk with horns and syncopated drum beats are heard in black cinema films throughout the 1960s-1970's.

1. "Let's Do It Again"
2. "Funky Love"
3. "A Whole Lot of Love"
4. "New Orleans"
5. "I Want to Thank You"
6. "Big Mac"
7. "After Sex"
8. "Chase" (Quinton Joseph, Phillip Upchurch, Gary Thompson, Floyd Morris, Joseph Scott, Mayfield)

== Reception ==
The revenue is listed at $11.8 million and was one of the highest-grossing films of 1975.

Roger Ebert gave it 3 out of 4 stars, saying that it "isn't a terribly ambitious comedy, but within its limitations it works well". Gene Siskel also awarded 3 stars out of 4 and wrote: "After making Uptown Saturday Night, Cosby said that he wasn't satisfied with the picture even though it was selling well. He said he wanted to use the same gang and do it once more, but better. That's been accomplished, and there's no reason to stop at two. Cosby and Poitier have broad humor down pat; I'd like to see them get witty". Richard Eder of The New York Times wrote that the action "is familiar stuff, but some of it is pretty funny" and found Cosby in particular "hilarious". Variety wrote: "The gang from Uptown Saturday Night encores successfully in Let's Do It Again, a funny, free-form farcical revue reminiscent in substance of classic Hal Roach comedy". Kevin Thomas of the Los Angeles Times said: "At 112 minutes, Let's Do It Again is extraordinarily long for a comedy, yet its humor is sustained throughout, thanks to Wesley's ingenuity and to the fine ensemble playing of a large cast under Poitier's affectionate direction". Jonathan Rosenbaum of The Monthly Film Bulletin wrote: "Despite a frankly nonsensical plot full of formula antics and an unnecessarily protracted running time, Let's Do It Again is a healthy reminder of the relative verve, energy and talent to be found nowadays in the so-called 'black exploitation' film—a somewhat loaded term considering the fact that no one ever speaks of 'white exploitation' and particularly inappropriate in relation to such a high-spirited yet unassuming entertainment as this".

Rotten Tomatoes gives it a rating of 63% based on reviews from eight critics. The film also won all five NAACP Image Awards for which it received a nomination. The film earned $6 million in theatrical rentals in North America.

== References to Richard Wesley's life ==
In the DVD's commentary, Wesley admits that several scenes and characters are references to his life, more specifically his childhood. 40th Street Black was the nickname of a kid at a camp Richard's brother attended. Jimmie Walker's character, "Bootney" was another reference to his life. Wesley grew up knowing two brothers named "Lil Bootney and Big Bootney". Wesley mentions that the two were known as fighters within the community.

== In popular culture ==
- The late Brooklyn rap artist The Notorious B.I.G. took his alias, Biggie Smalls, from Calvin Lockhart's character in this film. However, the alias could not be used as his name due to ownership issues.
- East Coast rap group Camp Lo titled their second album Let's Do It Again; their debut album was titled Uptown Saturday Night, a reference to the two Cosby and Poitier films.
- Musician/MTV personality Fonzworth Bentley took his stage name from Jimmie Walker's character, Bootney Farnsworth.

== Remake ==
Will Smith and his production company, Overbrook Entertainment, secured the rights in 2002 to the trilogy for remakes to star Smith and to be distributed by Warner Bros. Smith hoped to get Eddie Murphy, Martin Lawrence and other famous African-American stars for the films.

== See also ==
- List of American films of 1975
- List of boxing films
