= Richard Wesley =

American playwright and screenwriter

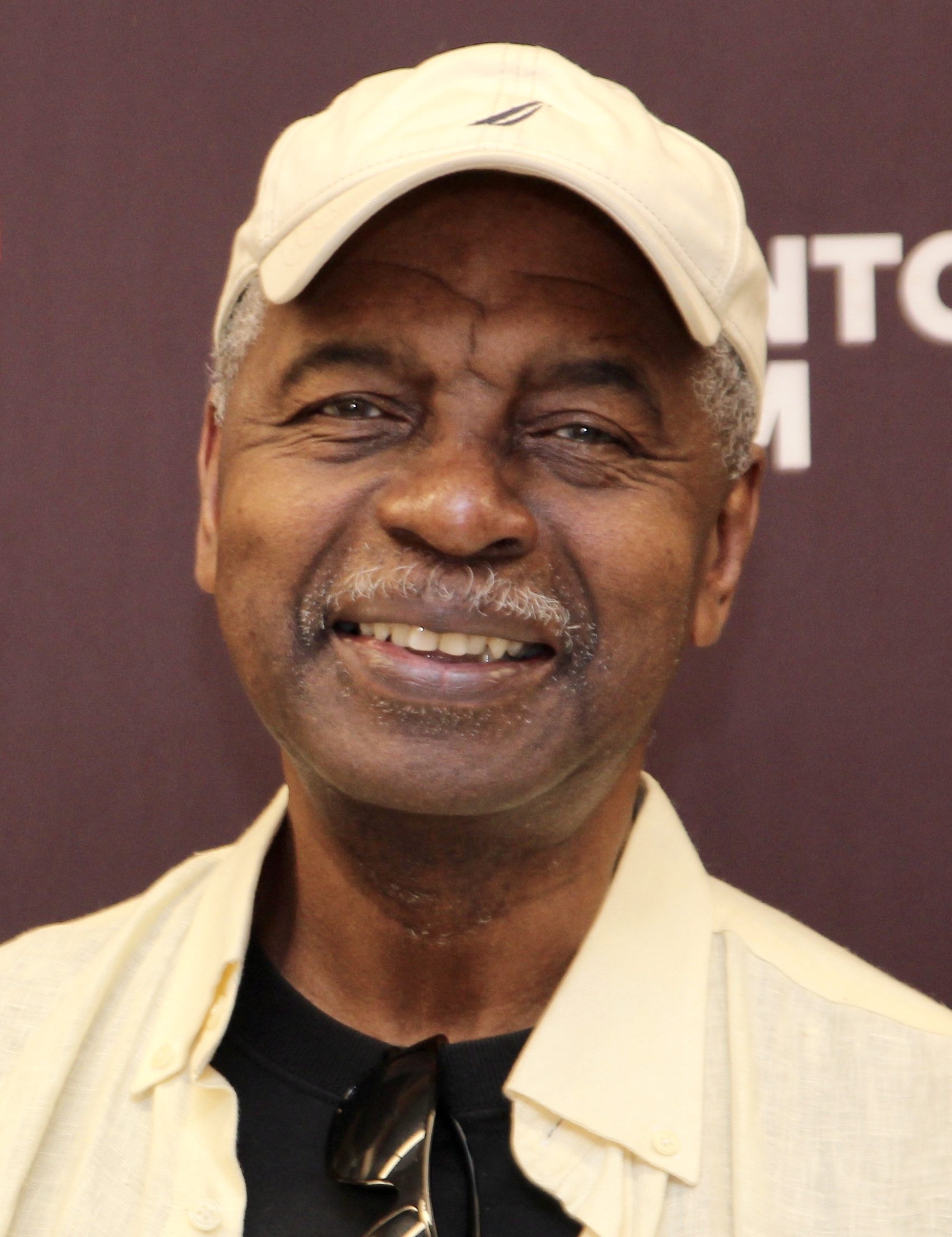
- Born: July 11, 1945 (age 81); Newark, New Jersey, U.S.
- Education: Howard University (MFA)
- Occupation: Writer

Richard Wesley (born July 11, 1945) is an American playwright and screenwriter. He is an associate professor at New York University's Tisch School of the Arts in the Rita and Burton Goldberg Department of Dramatic Writing.

== Early life ==
Wesley was born in Newark, New Jersey, to George and Gertrude Wesley, and grew up in the Ironbound section. After finishing high school, he studied playwriting and dramatic literature at Howard University and graduated with a Master of Fine Arts degree in 1967.

== Career ==
He first became known for the 1971 New York Shakespeare Festival of his play Black Terror, which portrayed the story of a black revolution. Clive Barnes, writing for The New York Times, described the play as a "winner" that "makes the case for black revolution and against black revolution." Wesley received the 1971/1972 Drama Desk Award as most promising playwright for Black Terror, an award which came with a $100 check from Ticketron. The Jarboro Company of La MaMa Experimental Theatre Club took Black Terror on tour in Italy in 1972, performing it alongside five one-act plays by Ed Bullins.

In 1975, Wesley wrote and directed The Past Is the Past, a drama about a black man who meets the father who abandoned him years prior. The play was revived, featuring John Amos and Ralph Carter, in 1989 at the Billie Holiday Theatre in Bedford-Stuyvesant, Brooklyn.

Wesley wrote the screenplays for the 1974 film Uptown Saturday Night and the 1975 film Let's Do It Again, both starring Bill Cosby and Sidney Poitier.

His 1978 play, The Mighty Gents, is the story of the members of a gang that had conquered their rival gang, the Zombies, and ruled the Central Ward of Newark. The play depicts the gang members in their 30s and left with only the recollections of their earlier success.

His 1989 play, The Talented Tenth, borrows its title from W. E. B. Du Bois's 1903 article, The Talented Tenth, which described the likelihood of one in ten black men becoming leaders of black people by continuing their education, writing books, or becoming directly involved in social change. The play portrays six fictional graduates of Howard University (a realtor, an advertising agent, a middle manager at a Fortune 500 firm, a Republican) who have succeeded, but feel guilty about betraying their origins. Wesley considered bringing The Mighty Gents character of Essex Braxton, who achieved financial success through loan sharking and prostitution after leaving the gang, into The Talented Tenth, but dropped the idea as too artificial. The play received six awards, including dramatic production of the year and best playwright, at the 1989 AUDELCO Recognition Awards. These awards were established in 1973 by the Audience Development Committee to honor excellence in African-American theatre in New York.

In 2013, Wesley was asked by the Trilogy: An Opera Company of Newark, New Jersey to write the libretto for the opera Papa Doc, composed by Dorothy Rudd Moore and based on an essay by Edwidge Danticat from her 2010 book Create Dangerously.

In April 2015, Autumn, Wesley's first full-length play in over two decades, premiered at The Crossroads Theater in New Brunswick, New Jersey.

Five, an opera from Trilogy: An Opera Company about the 1989 Central Park Five jogger case in New York City, composed by Anthony Davis with a libretto by Wesley, premiered at the New Jersey Performing Arts Center in Newark on November 12, 2016. An expanded version, The Central Park Five, premiered on June 15, 2019, at the Long Beach Opera Company in California. In May 2020 composer Davis was awarded a Pulitzer Prize for Music for the expanded opera.

== Personal life ==
He is married to author Valerie Wilson Wesley. As of 2000, he was a resident of Montclair, New Jersey.

== Selected works ==
=== Plays ===
- Black Terror (1971)
- The Sirens (1974)
- The Mighty Gents (1978)
- The Talented Tenth (1989)
- Autumn (2015)

=== Screenplays ===
- Uptown Saturday Night (1974)
- Let's Do It Again (1975)
- Fast Forward (1985)
- Native Son (1986)

=== Teleplays ===
- Murder Without Motive (1991 - NBC)
- Mandela and de Klerk (1997 - Showtime)
- Bojangles (2000 - Showtime)

=== Television series contributions ===
- Fallen Angels (1993–1995, Showtime)
- 100 Centre Street (2001–2002, A&E)

== Awards and honors ==
- 1971 Drama Desk Award - Black Terror
- 1974 AUDELCO Recognition Award - The Past is the Past
- 1974 NAACP Image Award for Best Picture - Uptown Saturday Night
- 1977 AUDELCO Recognition Award - The Sirens
- 1978 AUDELCO Recognition Award - The Mighty Gents
- 1989 AUDELCO Recognition Award - The Talented Tenth
- 2013 National Black Theater Festival August Wilson Playwright Award
