= Lee Chamberlin =

American actress (1938–2014)

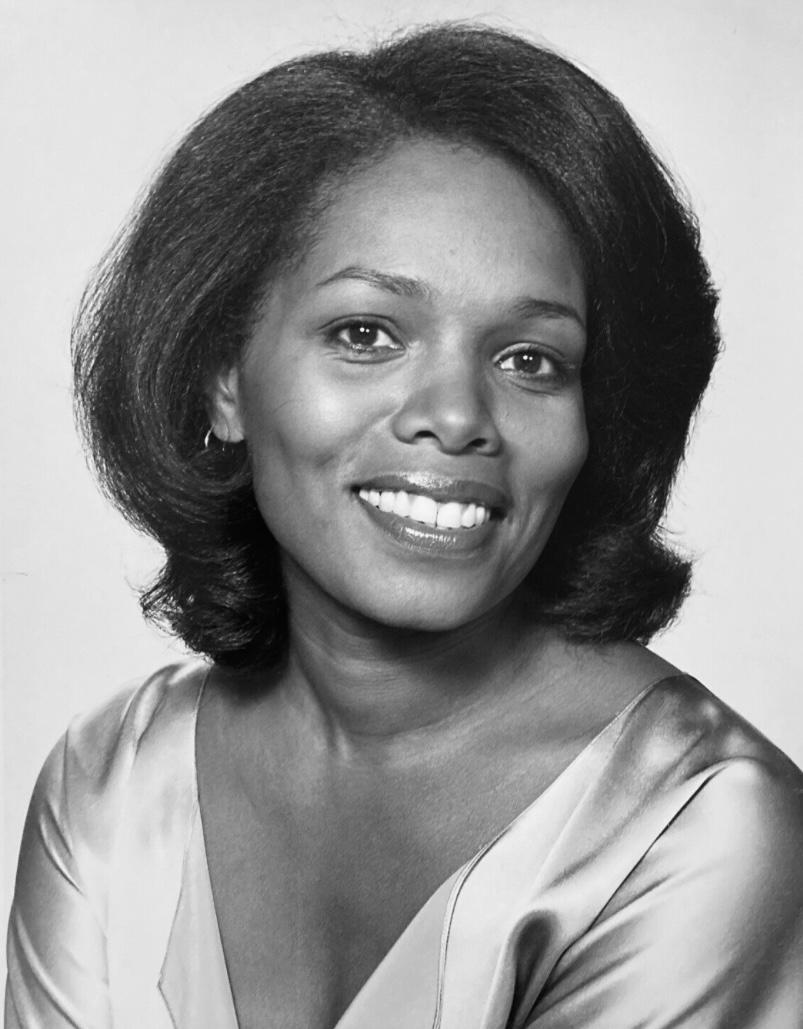
- Chamberlin in Paris, 1979
- Born: Alverta LaPallo; February 14, 1938; New York City, U.S.
- Died: May 25, 2014 (aged 76); Chapel Hill, North Carolina, U.S.
- Occupation: Actress
- Years active: 1968–2013
- Spouse: Daniel Edward Chamberlin (m. 1960; died 1999)
- Children: 2

Lee Chamberlin (born Alverta LaPallo; February 14, 1938 – May 25, 2014) was an American theatrical, film and television actress.

== Early life ==
Chamberlin was born in New York City. She was the daughter of Ida Roberta (née Small) and Brazilian author Bernando LaPallo. LaPallo was deemed at one point to be the oldest living man in the United States, dying at the claimed age of 114 in Tempe, Arizona, in 2015 although his case has since been disputed.

== Career ==
It's little known that Lee Chamberlin's first forays on stage were with the Pearl Primus dance company in Harlem which appears to have been a rite of passage. Prior to her acting career, Lee Chamberlin had a successful career in France as a singer. She was signed to a small label Chez Impact and in 1966 several songs were released that included Tu Vivras Toujours written by (J. Claudric - E. Marnay), Reponds Moi!, J'ai Eu Si Peur, J'Aimerais Tant que Tu sois La and a spirited number Haïlilolilolilolaï (Sven Nilsson - E. Marnay). She performed at L'Olympia in Paris. Once back in the United States she did the jazz circuit touring in The Playboy Clubs nationwide but soon tired of living on the road and being away from her family. Her acting career on stage began playing a Yoruba priestess who jumps into the sea preferring to drown rather than be raped by the slavers on in the 1968 Slave Ship, production at the Brooklyn Academy of Music based on the outline of LeRoi Jones later known as Amiri Baraka. She appeared at The Orpheum Theatre in a musical production called Do Your Own Thing, based on Shakespeare's Twelfth Night, and in an off-Broadway production, The Believers. She played Cordelia opposite James Earl Jones's King Lear in 1973 in the Delacorte Theatre at the New York Shakespeare in the Park Festival. Frustrated with the narrow portrayals of African Americans in the arts she turned to writing and directing herself to change the narrative. She went on to win six AUDELCO Awards for Excellence in Black Theater on November 21, 1988, for her musical play Struttin’, performed at the Rosetta LeNoire AMAS Repertory Theater. She also appeared in the play Hospice as part of the Women's Series for the 1983-4 Season produced at Woody King Jrs New Federal Theatre then located at The Henry Street Settlement Theatre in Lower Manhattan.

Chamberlin wrote and acted in her one-woman play Objects in the Mirror are Closer than They Seem first as a reading in Miami, Florida, and later in 2010 as part of The Kitchen Theatre's Counter series in Ithaca, New York, from February 10–14 in a sold-out run. The play was directed by Rachel Lampert. Chamberlin founded a non-profit organization, Lee Chamberlin's Playwrights' Inn Project Inc., establishing it in France to nurture the work of African American playwrights.

Chamberlin got her big break in television in 1971, as part of the original cast of CTW children's show The Electric Company, appearing in the show’s first two years before leaving the show in 1973. Lee made guest appearances in the television series What's Happening!!, Diff'rent Strokes, and NYPD Blue. In 1979, she played the wife of James Earl Jones's character on the short-lived police drama Paris. Most notably she played Odile Harris in Roots: The Next Generations (1979) the love interest to Alex Hailey played by James Earl Jones. Her first recurring role in a major television sitcom was as Lucy Daniels in "All's Fair" from 1976 to 1977 that starred Bernadette Peters and Richard Crenna. In the 1970s, she appeared on shows such as Lou Grant and James at 16.

In the early 1980s, Chamberlin appeared on The White Shadow. Other guest spots in the 1980s included Ryan's Four and the film Beat Street. in the role of Alicia. In 1994; she played Commander Della Thorne in Viper. In 1998, she played Dr. Timmi in The Practice, and Judge Leslie Battles in To Have and To Hold.

In 1999, Chamberlin made guest appearances on NewsRadio and Moesha. In 2000 she appeared in Any Day Now and City of Angels. From 1982 to 1990, Chamberlin played Pat Baxter, the mother of Angela Baxter Hubbard on All My Children. In 1997, she appeared in Diagnosis Murder (television series) as Judge Gwen Mosford. In 2002, she appeared on episodes of Touched by An Angel and Judging Amy.

Chamberlin's first role in film was a small part in Up the Sandbox starring Barbra Streisand. She had a prominent role as Madame Zenobia in the United Artists film directed by Sidney Poitier Uptown Saturday Night and the follow-up Let's Do it Again. She also appeared in several television films including Long Journey Back (1978), Brave New World (1980), and Once Upon A Family (1980). Her final film role was in the award-winning short film Habeaus Corpus (2013) directed by Booker T Mattison. Others in the film included Tim Reid, Chad L. Coleman (The Wire) Jamie Hector (The Wire).

== Death ==
Chamberlin died of cancer at the age of 76 on May 25, 2014, in Chapel Hill, North Carolina. She was survived by a daughter, Erika Chamberlin and a son, Matthew Chamberlin, a sister and two grandchildren.

== Filmography ==
Year	Title	Role	Notes
1970	All at Sea	Jim	
1972	Up the Sandbox	Jan	
1974	Uptown Saturday Night	Madame Zenobia	
1975	Let's Do It Again	Dee Dee Williams	
1980	Brave New World	Head Nurse	3-hour television film
1984	Beat Street	Alicia	
