= Harold Farberman =

American classical composer

Harold Farberman (November 2, 1929 – November 24, 2018) was an American conductor, composer and percussionist.

== Biography ==
Farberman studied percussion at Juilliard, and composition at the New England Conservatory and at Tanglewood with Aaron Copland. In 1951, he joined the Boston Symphony Orchestra as the youngest player ever to become a full-time member of the orchestra.

Farberman's conducting positions included principal guest conductor of the Denver Symphony Orchestra in 1963, and music director and conductor of the Colorado Springs Orchestra from 1967 to 1970, and the Oakland Symphony Orchestra (later reorganized as the Oakland East Bay Symphony) from 1971 to 1979, where he gave a rare concert performance of Scott Joplin's folk opera Treemonisha. During Farberman's tenure with the Oakland Symphony, there were concerns about his work as music director, and his difficult relationship with the orchestra. When his contract was to be renewed in 1977, the Players' Committee expressed its profound dissatisfaction with his work and the majority voted that his contract should not be renewed, but the orchestra board decided to renew it against the musicians' wishes.

He championed the work of Charles Ives, having recorded more of his works than any other conductor, including all four of his symphonies. He also recorded the complete symphonies of Gustav Mahler and Michael Haydn with the London Symphony Orchestra and the Bournemouth Sinfonietta, respectively.

Farberman founded the International Conductors Guild in 1976, and was founder and director of the Conductors' Institute, a summer conducting program initiated at the Hartt School, and now located at Bard College. Marin Alsop, a graduate of this program, was one of his most notable students. Farberman was also the author of The Art of Conducting Technique.

Farberman's compositions included three operas; many works for orchestra and chamber ensembles; the film score to the Academy Award–winning documentary, The Great American Cowboy; and music for dance companies.

== Discography ==
=== Studio albums ===
Year	Album details
2003	Irwin Bazelon: Junctures; Spirits of the Night; Sunday Silence; Concatenations: Release date: September 30, 2003; Label: Albany Music Distribution

== Orchestras conducted by Farberman ==
Listed alphabetically

- BBC Symphony Orchestra
- Bournemouth Sinfonietta
- Danish Radio Orchestra
- English Chamber Orchestra
- Hessischer Rundfunk
- Hong Kong Philharmonic
- KBS Symphony Orchestra
- London Symphony Orchestra
- Melbourne Symphony Orchestra
- Mozarteum Orchestra
- Philharmonia
- Radio Audizioni Italiane Orchestra
- Royal Philharmonic
- Seoul Philharmonic
- Swedish Radio Orchestra
- Stockholm Philharmonic
- Sydney Symphony

== Selected compositions ==
- Variations for Percussion With Piano (1954) – composed for the New York Percussion Trio
- Evolution (1954) – scored for over one hundred percussion instruments and has been recorded four times, once by Leopold Stokowski.
- Greek Scene (1957) – a trio for mezzo-soprano, piano, and percussion chosen to represent the United States in an International Composer's Symposium held in Paris.
- Cello Concerto (2000) – premiered by the American Symphony Orchestra at Lincoln Center's Avery Fisher Hall.
- Diamond Street (2009) – premiered at Hudson Opera House.

== Personal ==
- Farberman was an uncle of Emmy Award winning actress Lisa Kudrow.
