= Daniel Nagrin =

American dancer (1917–2008)

- Nagrin performing the piece “Jacaranda” in 1979
- Born: May 22, 1917; New York City, New York, USA
- Died: December 29, 2008 (aged 91); Tempe, Arizona, USA
- Occupation(s): Choreographer, dancer
- Years active: 1940s–1980s
- Spouse(s): Helen Tamiris; Phyllis Steele (1991-2008)
- Website: nagrin.com

Daniel Nagrin (May 22, 1917 – December 29, 2008) was an American modern dancer, choreographer, teacher, and author. He was born in New York City.

Nagrin studied with Martha Graham, Anna Sokolow, Hanya Holm, Bill Matons and Helen Tamiris whom he later married. In addition to working as a modern dancer, Nagrin also performed on Broadway in Plain and Fancy, Up in Central Park, and Annie Get Your Gun, among other musicals. His 1950 dance Dance in the Sun was adapted by filmmaker Shirley Clarke for her 1953 film of the same name.

In June 1954 he formed the Dance-Percussion Trio with David Shapiro and Ronald Gould (who would go on to form the New York Percussion Trio), and the group toured the United States in June and July of that year. Nagrin and his wife formed the Tamiris-Nagrin Company in 1960. When Tamiris died in 1966, Nagrin concentrated on a solo career. In the early 1970s Nagrin formed "The Workgroup", a performance company including dancers such as Sarah Stackhouse and with a focus on improvisation.

Nagrin's better known choreographic works include "The Peloponnesian War" (with music by Eric Salzman), "Strange Hero", "Man of Action", "Spanish Dance", and "Jazz, Three Ways". Additionally, he choreographed for the 1954 film His Majesty O'Keefe.

In 1985, a 15-hour compilation of Nagrin's work, The Nagrin Videotape Library of Dances, was assembled. It is held in the Dance Collection at the New York Public Library for the Performing Arts.

Nagrin, who held a B.S. in Education from City College in New York, taught at C.W. Post College, New York University, the American Dance Festival, and Arizona State University. He was the author of several books, including How to Dance Forever: Surviving Against the Odds (1988) and Choreography and the Specific Image (2001).

Nagrin died on December 29, 2008 in Tempe, Arizona.

== Selected choreography ==
- Private Johnny Jukebox (1942)
- Spanish Dance (1948)
- Strange Hero (1948)
- Man of Action (1948)
- Dance in the Sun (1950)
- Faces from Walt Whitman (1950)
- Man Dancing (1954)
- Progress (1957)
- Indeterminate Figure (1957)
- Three Happy Men (1958)
- Jazz, Three Ways (1958)
- For a Young Person (1958)
- A Dancer Prepares (1958)
- An American Journey (1960)
- Two Improvisations (1962)
- The Man Who Did Not Care (1963)
- In the Dusk (1965)
- Not Me, But Him (1965)
- Path (1965)
- A Gratitude (1965)
- Why Not (1965)
- The Peloponnesian War (1968)
- The Ritual (1971)
- Rondo (1971)
- Rituals of Power (1971)
- Signs of the Times (1972)
- Ritual for Two (1972)
- Ritual for Eight (1972)
- Wounded Knee (1972)
- Sea Anemone Suite (1972)
- Hello-Farewell-Hello (1973)
- Steps (1973)
- Jazz Changes (1974)
- Sweet Woman (1974)
- Nineteen Upbeats (1975)
- The Edge is Also a Center (1975)

== Bibliography ==
- Chujoy, Anatole (1967), The Dance Encyclopedia. Simon and Schuster. ISBN 0-671-24027-7
- McDonagh, Don (1976), The Complete Guide to Modern Dance.
- Nagrin, Daniel (1988), How to Dance Forever: Surviving Against the Odds. New York: HarperCollins. ISBN 0-688-07799-4
- Nagrin, Daniel (1994), Dance and the Specific Image: Improvisation. Pittsburgh: Univ. of Pittsburgh Press. ISBN 978-0-8229-5520-7, ISBN 0-8229-5520-2
- Nagrin, Daniel (1997), Six Questions : Acting Technique for Dance Performance (1997 edition). Pittsburgh: Univ. of Pittsburgh Press. ISBN 978-0-8229-5624-2, ISBN 0-8229-5624-1
- Nagrin, Daniel (2001), Choreography and the Specific Image: Nineteen Essays and a Workbook. Pittsburgh: Univ. of Pittsburgh Press. ISBN 978-0-8229-5750-8, ISBN 0-8229-5750-7
- Schlundt, Christena L. (1997), Daniel Nagrin: A Chronicle of His Professional Career. University of California Publications: Catalogs and bibliographies, vol. 13. Berkeley, California: University of California Press. ISBN 0-520-09813-7
