= Bernando LaPallo =

- Born: August 17, 1910; Vitória, Espírito Santo, Brazil
- Died: December 19, 2015 (aged 105); Tempe, Arizona, U.S.
- Citizenship: Brazilian, American
- Occupations: Author, chef, longevity advocate
- Known for: Promoted longevity, natural diet, and health advocacy; claimed supercentenarian status
- Spouse: Married twice
- Children: 3, including Lee Chamberlin
- Website: agelesslivemorestore.com

Bernando LaPallo (August 17, 1910 – December 19, 2015) was a Brazilian-American author, chef, and public speaker who gained public attention as a claimed supercentenarian. He widely asserted that he was born on August 17, 1901, which would have made him 114 years old at the time of his death. However, public records, census data, and military documentations indicate that he was born in either 1906 or 1910, making him a semi-supercentenarian at age 105 or 109. (Note: While LaPallo claimed a birth date of August 17, 1901 (which would make his age 114 at death), public records, including census data and his World War II draft card, indicate he was born in 1906 or 1910, making his verified age at death 105 or 109.)

During his later years, LaPallo authored books on nutrition, wellness, and healthy aging, attributing his vitality and long life to a strict diet of natural foods, regular physical exercise, and daily skin care regimens.

== Early life ==
According to LaPallo's accounts, he was born in Vitória, Brazil, and moved with his family to the United States around the age of five, settling in New York City, where he lived for over nine decades. He claimed that his longevity ran in the family, stating that his mother lived to age 105, his grandmother lived to 108, and his father—a practicing physician—lived to 99.

LaPallo studied culinary arts and health sciences, subsequently working as a chef and massage therapist throughout his professional career.

== Age verification controversy ==
In his later life, LaPallo claimed to have been born on August 17, 1901. As he began appearing in news media, written interviews, and online wellness campaigns promoting his books, researchers evaluated his claims against public domain records. Media outlets and official verification bodies noted that he lacked official proof of birth from 1901. So far, the only evidence that points to his birth being 1901, Is a mention of him in the Family Bible of his family.

Independent research into public archives, including U.S. census entries, World War II draft records, and his official death certificate, suggested that LaPallo was born years later than he claimed, with official documentation supporting birth years of circa 1906 or 1910. Consequently, demography and gerontology organizations classified his claim of being born in 1901 as unvalidated or debunked, placing his true age at death as 105 years, 124 days (assuming a 1910 birth date). Critics noted that the longevity products and books sold during his public advocacy created a commercial incentive for age inflation.

== Longevity claims and lifestyle ==
LaPallo gained widespread attention in health and lifestyle media for maintaining physical mobility, cognitive clarity, and smooth skin well past his 100th birthday. He frequently cited five specific foods as the core components of his daily nutritional regimen:

- Garlic: Consumed raw or cooked for its medicinal and immune-boosting properties.
- Honey: Used as a natural sweetener in place of refined sugar.
- Cinnamon: Added to beverages and food for anti-inflammatory benefits and blood sugar control.
- Dark chocolate: Consumed in moderation for antioxidants.
- Olive oil: Consumed orally and used topically as a moisturizer for skin care.

In addition to his diet, LaPallo emphasized daily physical exercise, including walking at least one to two miles every day, avoiding red meat and processed foods, drinking clean water, keeping an active mind through reading, and maintaining spiritual faith and peace of mind.

== Later years and death ==
LaPallo published his health philosophy in his book Age Less, Live More: Achieving Health and Longevity, which led to appearances on television news segments, public lectures, and web seminars.

He spent the final years of his life residing in Tempe, Arizona. He outlived two wives and two of his three children, including American actress Lee Chamberlin. LaPallo died of natural causes at his home in Tempe on December 19, 2015.
