= Samuel Jones (composer) =

American composer and conductor (born 1935)

- Jones in Seattle, 1999
- Born: 2 June 1935 (age 91); Mississippi, U.S.
- Occupations: Composer and conductor
- Website: http://samueljones.net/index.html

Samuel Jones (born June 2, 1935, Inverness, Mississippi) is an American composer and conductor.

== Biography ==
Samuel Jones, a native of Mississippi (b. 1935), graduated from the Central High School in Jackson and received his undergraduate degree with highest honors at Millsaps College. He acquired his professional training at the Eastman School of Music, where he earned his M.A. and Ph.D. degrees in composition under Howard Hanson, Bernard Rogers, and Wayne Barlow. His mentors in conducting include Richard Lert and William Steinberg.

Jones enjoyed his earliest success as a conductor, advancing through the ranks of smaller American orchestras to become music director of the Rochester Philharmonic. He was then asked to help found a significant new music school in Houston, Texas. He served as the first dean of the Shepherd School of Music at Rice University, building its faculty and facilities over six years as dean. Jones continued to serve as professor of composition and conducting after stepping down as dean, while serving as director of graduate studies. Jones influenced a number of conductors and composers through his work as a teacher at Rice and in workshops of the Conductors Guild and League of American Orchestras. His students include a number of accomplished composers and conductors, including Gabriela Lena Frank, Evan Khulmann, Larry Rachleff and Andrew Levin. In 1970, he conducted the Naumburg Orchestral Concerts, in the Naumburg Bandshell, Central Park, in the summer series.

In 1997 Jones was appointed composer-in-residence at the Seattle Symphony. He retired from full-time academic life after 24 years at Rice to relocate to the Pacific Northwest and dedicate more of his attention to composition.

Samuel Jones's compositions include an oratorio and three symphonies as well as shorter orchestral works, works for chorus and orchestra, opera, chamber music and works for children. One of his proudest achievements, which he mentioned to a Huffington Post reporter in 2015, was the unlikely feat of persuading author Truman Capote to allow him to set Capote's iconic story, A Christmas Memory, as an opera, which debuted in Dallas in 1992 and for which he wrote the libretto.

His music has been performed by the Philadelphia Orchestra, the Seattle Symphony, the Detroit Symphony, the Utah Symphony, the Houston Symphony, the Cincinnati Symphony, the Rochester Philharmonic Orchestra, the Louisville Orchestra, the New Orleans Philharmonic, the Beaverton Symphony Orchestra and many others. His violin concerto was premiered in 2015 by Anne Akiko Meyers with the All-Star Orchestra conducted by Gerard Schwarz (online). His music is published by Carl Fischer and Campanile Music Press and is recorded by Naxos, CRI, Gasparo, ACA, and Centennial Records.

Jones's work as a conductor includes serving as conductor of the Rochester Philharmonic Orchestra and Saginaw Symphony Orchestra. He has been engaged as a guest conductor by the Detroit Symphony Orchestra, the Houston Symphony Orchestra, the Pittsburgh Symphony Orchestra, the Buffalo Philharmonic, the Prague Symphony Orchestra, and the Iceland Symphony Orchestra. Early in his career he founded the Alma Symphony and the Delta College Summer Festival of Music in Michigan. He serves as music advisor to the Flint Symphony Orchestra in Michigan.

Samuel Jones has served as president of the Conductors Guild and received numerous awards and prizes. These include a Ford Foundation Recording/Publication Award, grants from Martha Baird Rockefeller Foundation and National Endowment for the Arts grants, ASCAP awards, an International Angel Award, three Music Awards from the Mississippi Institute of Arts and Letters, and the Seattle Symphony's 2002 Artistic Recognition Award for outstanding service to the orchestra. Millsaps College awarded him an honorary doctorate in May 2000. The same year he was inducted into the inaugural class of the Mississippi Musicians Hall of Fame. He was recently named the Music Alive Composer in Residence for the Meridian Symphony Orchestra by Meet The Composer and the League of American Orchestras.

== Works ==
=== Theater ===
- A Christmas Memory
- The Temptation of Jesus

=== Orchestral ===
- Aurum Aurorae
- Chaconne and Burlesque
- Chorale-Overture for Organ and Orchestra
- Elegy
- Fanfare and Celebration
- Festival Fanfare
- In Retrospect
- Janus
- Let Us Now Praise Famous Men
- Listen Now, My Children
- Overture for a City
- Roundings: Musings and Meditations on Texas New Deal Murals
- Three Suites From Roundings
  - I: Hymn To The Earth
  - II: Machines
  - III: The Open Range
- Symphony No. 1
- Symphony No. 3 (Palo Duro Canyon)
- A Symphonic Requiem (Variations on a Theme of Howard Hanson)

=== Chorus and orchestra ===
- Canticles of Time (Symphony No. 2)
- Eudora’s Fable: The Shoe Bird
- Gaudeo
- Reunion Benediction
- The Seas of God (Fanfare-Overture)
- The Trumpet of the Swan

=== Concerti ===
- Tuba Concerto
- Horn Concerto
- Concerto for Trombone and Orchestra
- Concerto for Violoncello and Orchestra
- Concerto for Violin and Orchestra
- Concerto for Flute and Orchestra

=== Solo and chamber ===
- Four Haiku
- How Do I Love Thee?
- Piano Sonata
- Sonata for Cello and Piano
- Sonata for Unaccompanied Viola (In the Style of J.S. Bach)
- Spaces for Unaccompanied Cello & Narrator
- Two Movements for Harpsichord
