= Julius Penson Williams =

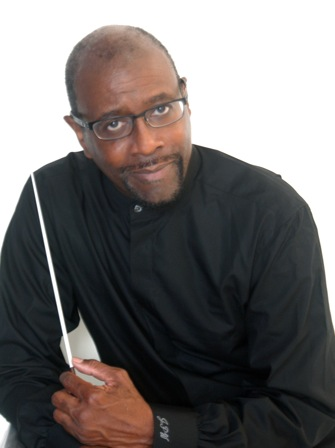
- Williams in 2011
- Born: June 22, 1954 (age 72); Bronx, New York, US
- Employer: Berklee College of Music
- Website: juliuspwilliams.com

Julius Penson Williams (born June 22, 1954, in The Bronx, New York), is an American composer, conductor, and college professor. He served as president of the International Conductors Guild from 2019 to 2023. An author of both instrumental and vocal music, Williams has composed operas, symphonies, and chorus works for stage, concert hall, film, and television. Primarily a classically trained musician, Williams also writes in genres including gospel, jazz, and other contemporary forms.

== Biography ==
Born in New York, on June 22, 1954, in the Bronx, he began playing drums at age eight, then picked up other instruments such as the piano. Williams was educated in the New York public school system and graduated in 1972 from Andrew Jackson High School, a performing arts school in Queens, New York. Williams attended Herbert Lehman College and Hartt School of Music where he received his, B.S. and M.M.E. respectively. He has an honorary doctorate from Keene State College in New Hampshire. While in Colorado, Williams studied orchestral conducting and composition at the Aspen Music School in 1984.

Williams is a frequent guest conductor, and has had several artist-in-residencies and teaching positions. He has received a number of awards for his music. He has studied, performed and taught abroad in countries such as Russia and China. Williams has written articles, edited an anthology, and submitted writings to journals on the music of African Americans.

Williams has been a full-time professor at the Berklee College of Music in Boston since fall 1998. He is the professor of composition and artistic director of The Berklee Contemporary Symphony at Berklee College of Music. He teaches composition, conducting, theory, and also runs the Berklee International Composers Institute. He is also the conductor of the Great American Songbook Orchestra. In 2019, he was composer in residence for the Boston Symphony Orchestra.

People who Williams has credited as having influenced his music are Ulysses Kay, Coleridge-Taylor Perkinson, Charles Bell and John Corigliano.

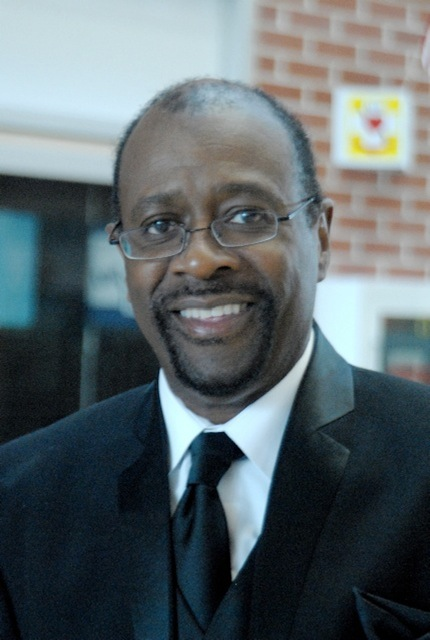
Photograph

He is president of the International Conductors Guild as of 2020 to 2021, after being appointed in 2019.

He was the music director and conductor of Trilogy: An Opera Company starting in 2009.

For ten seasons, he was the artistic director of the New York State Summer School of the Arts.

== Personal life ==
He lives in Connecticut with his wife Lenora Williams. They have three children.

== Works ==
=== Choral ===
- In commendation of music, for SATB (1988). Première: 1988
- The Spring, for SATB (1982). Première: 1982 commissioned by Roland Carter and the Hampton University choir
- The Fall, for SATB (1982). Première: 1982 commissioned by Roland Carter and the Hampton University choir
- The Winter, for SATB (1982). Première: 1982 commissioned by Roland Carter and the Hampton University choir
- The Summer, for SATB (1982). Première: 1982 commissioned by Roland Carter and the Hampton University choir
- The Lamb, for SATB (1982). Première: 1983 commissioned by the Association of Connecticut choruses for the 1983 conference at Yale University Premiered by the New Haven chorale

=== Instrumental ===
Instrumental works:

- Fanfare and Fugetto (1997) ca - Organ solo ...Dedicated to three organ friends
- Vermont's Escape (1989) - Clarinet/Piano/Tuba/Perc, Commissioned: Vermont Contemporary Ensemble, First Performance Congregational Church Vermont, December 1989
- Times of Troubles (1981) - Flute and Piano, First Performance: Society of University Composers 1981, LSU University, February 1982
- Alison's Dream (1981) - Oboe and Piano, First Performance: Dr. Alison Williams, oboe, Wesleyan University, May 1981
- Serenade (1980) - piano solo, First Performance: Real Art Ways Connecticut, 1981
- In Roads (trio) (1986) - ca 12, Flute, Oboe and Cello
- Fantasy on Bach (1984) - ca 5, Percussion/marim/xyl, First Performance: Connecticut Valley Youth Wind Ensemble, University of Hartford. Conductor: Peter Boonshaft
- Sounds of Colors (1976) - Organ Solo 5', With-In Myself (1976) ca 6, Voice/clarinet/2 Trps/trombone, First Performance: Herbert H. Lehman College
- Fanfare and Fugetto (1997) - ca, Organ solo. Dedicated to three organ friends
- Vermont's Escape (1989) - Clarinet/Piano/Tuba/Percussion. Commissioned: Vermont Contemporary Ensemble. First Performance Congregational Church Vermont, December 1989
- Times of Troubles (1981) - Flute and Piano. First Performance: Society of University Composers, 1981, LSU University, February 1982
- With-In Myself (1976) - ca 6, Voice/clarinet/2 Trps/trombone. First Performance: Herbert H. Lehman College

=== Orchestral ===
Orchestral works:

- Songs of Our Culture (Chamber Orchestra) Commissioned by the (Boston Symphony Orchestra) tribute to Maude Cuny Hare CA 15 minutes strings, Flute, trpt, Clarinet, Horn, Tuba, Percussion (2020)
- A Journey to Freedom (cantata), the john Daniels tribute CA 30 minutes, 3323/4321/tym, piano, percussion, Chorus, Orchestra, Soprano, Tenor soloist Commissioned by the Reston choral, November 2002
- Midnight Tolls. In Memeoriam September 11, 2001(2002) 3323/4321/Tym, percussion, piano, strings CA 9'30. Detroit Symphony Emerging composer recording Thomas Wilkins, March 16/17, 2002
- March of the Giant Pandas (2001) CA 6', 1111/22/strings/percussion.First Performance People's Republic of China. Embassy, Washington dc, Washington Symphony Jan.2001
- A Mountain night recessional (2000) Ca 7'. 2222/4321/strings/perc and solo Soprano Voice. First Performance: Washington Symphony. Biltmore Estates Summer festival, North Carolina, July 2000
- A Norman Overture (1985) ca 8'. 2222/4321/strings/xyl/marim/perc. First Performance: New York Philharmonic. Zubin Mehta, May 1985
- Meditation (1993) ca 6'. from the cantata Easter Celebration. 2222/4321/strings, a/sax/tsax/per. Commissioned Shenandoah University Virginia. Performance: Cleveland Orchestra. Jahja ling, 1994
- A Dance (1993) from the cantata Easter Celebration. 2222/4321/strings/Asax/Tsax/perc. Commissioned Shenandoah University Virginia. First performance: Shenandoah University Virginia
- Toccatina for Strings (1985) ca 8'. String orchestra. Commissioned camerata youth orchestra. First performance: cw post college 1985
- To Praise (1982) ca 10'. satb chorus/alto soloist/strings/ piano. Commissioned congregational church Hartford, CT
- Blues Concerto for harmonica and orchestra (1996) ca 25'app.. 3232/4331/strings/asax /tsax/ perc /piano. Commissioned Etowah Youth Symphony orchestra. First Performance: Etowah Youth Symphony orchestra. Mike Gagliarodo, conductor
- Easter Celebration (1993) ca 60'. Alto, Ten Soloist/ chorus/ orchestra/ jazz ensemble'. Gospel choir / dancers. Commissioned Shenandoah University Virginia. First performance: Shenandoah University Virginia. Julius P. Williams, Conductor, April 10, 1993
- Cinderella Ballet (1987) ca 120'. 2222/4321/strings, perc. Commissioned Nutmeg Ballet Connecticut. First performance: New Haven Symphony. Julius P. Williams, conductor
- Cinderella Ballet Suite (1991) ca 15'. 2222/4321/strings, perc.
- Heartbeat (1990) ca 3'. 2222/4321/strings/ perc./ piano/ elec/ bass. From the Film Score. First performance: orchestra Virginia Beach, September 1992
- Is It True for high voice and orchestra ca 4'. 2222/4321/Strs/piano. Commissioned Shenandoah University Virginia. First performance: Shenandoah University Virginia. Julius P. Williams, Conductor, April 10, 1993

== Discography ==
- Heart on the Wall, Dvorak Symphony, Albany Records (CD) - released summer 2011
- This is the Sound of Harmony composition Dreams Boston Children’s Choir - 2010
- Somewhere far Away, Dvorak Symphony, Albany Records (CD) - 2008, Troy 1072
- Place in Time, Dvorak Symphony, Albany Records (CD)- 2007, Troy 979
- Midnight Tolls, Dvorak Symphony, Albany Records (CD) - 2006
- The New American Romanticism- Dvorak Symphony, Albany Records (CD) - 2004, Troy 704
- The American Soloist (Dvorak Symphony) Albany Records (CD) - 2004 TROY 687
- Shades of Blue Visionary/Albany (CD) Records Troy 431 - February 2001
- Symphonic Brotherhood The Music of African American Composers, Albany Records (CD) Troy104
- Fare Ye Well Visionary Records - 2003
- The Great American Songbook-Berklee recording the music of Burt Bacharach, Berklee recording - 2008
- The Great American Songbook-Berklee recording the music of Duke Ellington, Berklee recording - 2007
- The Great American Songbook- the Music of Stevie Wonder, Berklee recording - 2007
- Love Stories - Julius Williams Conductor track "Violins"- Independent Gordon Chambers - 2007

== Musical theatre (compositions) ==
- June 1999, Musical Score "Indahomey"New Federal Theater, New York, NY
- November 1995, Musical Score for "The Paradise"Huntington Theater, Boston, Mass
- March 1991, Musical score for "Balm Yard". (Off Broadway). Premiered Riverside Church Theatre produced by the New Federal Theatre, New York.
- February 1981, Musical score for "Dreams Deferred" (Woodie King, Producer). Premiered at the New Federal Theatre, New York, NY
- February 10, 1979, Musical score for "Princess Too Tall" (Book by Karl Friedman). Premiered at the Henry Street Settlement Arts for Living Center, New York, NY
- November 17, 1978, Musical score for Mio (Book for Shauneille Perry). Premiered at the New Federal Theatre, New York, NY – March to May 1988
- January 28, 1978, Musical score and lyrics for The In Crowd" - (Book by J. E. Franklin) (Off Broadway). Premiered at the Henry Street Settlement Arts for Living Center, New York, NY

== Film and video ==
- October 2002- Fighting for Our Future, Principal Pictures/ lifetime TV
- October 10, 2002, 2003 Gracie Award winner, Yeah, My heart Beats loud, Juniper Pictures (independent) 1993

== See also ==
- Trilogy: An Opera Company
