= Valerie Wilson Wesley =

American novelist (born 1947)

- Born: November 22, 1947 (age 78)
- Education: Howard University; Bank Street College of Education; Columbia University Graduate School of Journalism
- Occupation: Author
- Spouse: Richard Wesley
- Children: 2
- Writing career
- Genres: Mystery fiction; children's literature

Valerie Wilson Wesley (born November 22, 1947) is an American author of mysteries, adult-theme novels, and children's books, and a former executive editor of Essence magazine. She is the author of the Tamara Hayle mystery series. Her writings, both fiction and non-fiction, have also appeared in numerous publications, including Essence, Family Circle, TV Guide, Ms., The New York Times, and the Swiss weekly magazine Die Weltwoche.

== Background ==
Wesley grew up in Ashford, Connecticut. She is African-American. She graduated from Howard University and earned master's degrees from the Bank Street College of Education and the Columbia Graduate School of Journalism. A former resident of East Orange, New Jersey, she now lives in Montclair, New Jersey, with her two daughters and playwright husband Richard Wesley.

== Published books ==
- Afro-Bets Book of Black Heroes from A to Z: An introduction to important Black achievers for young readers, with Wade Hudson (1988, Orange, New Jersey: Just Us Books, ISBN 0-940975-02-5)
- When Death Comes Stealing, a Tamara Hayle mystery (1994, New York: G.P. Putnam's Sons, ISBN 0-399-13949-4)
- Devil's Gonna Get Him, a Tamara Hayle mystery (1996, New York: Avon Books, ISBN 0-380-72492-8)
- Where Evil Sleeps, a Tamara Hayle mystery (1996, New York: G.P. Putnam's Sons, ISBN 0-399-14145-6)
- Freedom's Gifts: A Juneteenth story, illustrated by Sharon Wilson (1997, New York: Simon & Schuster Books for Young Readers, ISBN 0-689-80269-2)
- No Hiding Place, a Tamara Hayle mystery (1997, New York: G.P. Putnam's Sons, ISBN 0-399-14318-1)
- Easier to Kill, a Tamara Hayle mystery (1998, New York: G.P. Putnam's Sons, ISBN 0-399-14445-5)
- Ain't Nobody's Business if I Do (1999, New York: Avon Books, ISBN 0-380-97703-6)
- The Devil Riding, a Tamara Hayle mystery (2000, New York: Putnam, ISBN 0-399-14617-2)
- Always True to You in My Fashion (2002, New York: William Morrow, ISBN 0-06-018883-9)
- How to Lose Your Class Pet, illustrated by Maryn Roos (2003, New York: Jump at the Sun, ISBN 0-7868-1322-9)
- Dying in the Dark: A Tamara Hayle mystery (2004, New York: One World Ballantine Books, ISBN 0-345-46806-6)
- How to Fish for Trouble, illustrated by Maryn Roos (2004, New York: Jump at the Sun, ISBN 0-7868-1807-7)
- How to Lose Your Cookie Money, illustrated by Maryn Roos (2004, New York: Jump at the Sun, ISBN 0-7868-5146-5)
- 23 Ways to Mess up Valentine's Day (2005, New York: Jump at the Sun, ISBN 0-7868-5524-X)
- How to (almost) Ruin Your School Play, illustrated by Maryn Roos (2005, New York: Jump at the Sun/Hyperion Books for Children, ISBN 1-4155-7357-3)
- Playing My Mother's Blues (2005, New York: William Morrow, ISBN 0-06-018882-0)

== Awards and honors ==
- 1993 – Griot Award from the New York Chapter of the National Association of Black Journalists
- 1995 – Nominee for Shamus Award for Best First P.I. Novel (When Death Comes Stealing)
- 2000 – Excellence in Adult Fiction award from the Black Caucus of the American Library Association
