= International Conductors Guild =

- Abbreviation: ICG
- Formation: 1975; 51 years ago
- Founder: Harold Farberman
- Type: Non-profit organization
- Legal status: 501(c)(3) organization
- Headquarters: Leesburg, Virginia, US
- Location: Worldwide
- President: Claire Fox Hillard
- Website: internationalconductorsguild.org
- Formerly called: The Conductors Guild

The International Conductors Guild (ICG) is a 501(c)(3) non-profit organization based in Leesburg, Virginia. Founded as The Conductors Guild in 1974, the guild's purpose is to encourage and promote the highest standards in the art and profession of conducting worldwide. the ICG offers services to enhance the training and development of conductors, and promises to represent the views of conductors to the larger community of music professionals.

The ICG publishes the Journal of the Conductors Guild. It also sponsors an annual conference that provides a means of bringing new compositions to the attention of conductors, the viewpoints of a variety of conductors and composers, and a unique chance of fellowship and gathering for conductors from around the globe. The Guild's training activities include a mentor-apprentice program, conducting workshops for conductors of all skill levels lasting from three days to two weeks, Symposia, and Online Materials and Training.

The International Conductors Guild is governed by a group of Officers, and up to 25 Directors, who meet 3 times annually. A variety of board committee work is required of Board Directors who serve in order to help the profession, without personal gain.

Since 1988, the Conductors Guild has honored outstanding achievement in the conducting profession with the Theodore Thomas Award. Recipients of the award include Claudio Abbado, Sir Georg Solti, Maurice Abravanel, Marin Alsop, Kurt Masur, Robert Shaw, Frederick Fennell, Pierre Boulez, David Zinman, Michael Tilson Thomas and Esa-Pekka Salonen. The Guild's Max Rudolf Award, given since 1997, recognizes outstanding achievement as a scholar and mentor. Recipients have included Gustav Meier, Herbert Blomstedt, Daniel Lewis, and Paul Vermel.

== History ==
At a 1974 national conference of the American Symphony Orchestra League (now the League of American Orchestras) in Memphis, Tennessee, conductor Harold Farberman convened an informal meeting with other conductors to discuss challenges facing the profession led to plans to form a professional organization. The ICG was officially organized in 1975 at the League's San Diego conference. It continued as a subsidiary of the League until becoming a separate organization in 1985. The first European conference of the Conductors Guild took place in Copenhagen, Denmark in 2010. The guild was renamed the International Conductors Guild in 2019.

Guild events have featured leading figures in the world of concert music, including Pierre Boulez, Catherine Comet, David Zinman, Leonard Slatkin, Chen Yi, Frederick Fennell, Norman Dello Joio, Gunther Schuller, James Levine, Ulysses Kay, Keith Lockhart, and Alan Gilbert.

== Leadership ==
In January 2023, the delegates of the 49th ICG Conference in Valencia, Spain, elected Claire Fox Hillard as president, succeeding Julius Penson Williams.

=== Presidents ===
- Harold Farberman (1975–1979)
- Charles A. Ansbacher (1979–1981, 1986)
- Maurice Peress (1981–1983)
- Donald Portnoy (1983–1986)
- Samuel Jones (1987–1988)
- Evan Whallon (1989–1990)
- Michael Charry (1991–1992)
- Larry Newland (1993–1994)
- Adrian Gnam (1995–1996)
- Barbara Schubert (1997–1998)
- Wes Kenney (1999–2000)
- Harlan Parker (2001–2002)
- Emily Freeman Brown (2003–2004)
- Tonu Kalam (2005–2006)
- Sandra Dackow (2007–2008)
- Michael Griffith (2009–2010)
- James A. Anderson (2011-2013)
- Gordon Johnson (2014-2016)
- John Farrer (2016-2019)
- Julius Penson Williams (2019-2023)
- Claire Fox Hillard (2023-present)
