= New York Percussion Trio =

American musical group

The New York Percussion Trio was a three-member musical group consisting of two percussionists and one pianist, active in the New York City area from the early 1950s until the mid-1970s.

The group was originally formed in 1954 as the Dance-Percussion Trio, to accompany performances by the modern dancer Daniel Nagrin; Nagrin was a member of the trio along with the pianist David Shapiro and the percussionist Ronald Gould. The group toured the United States in June and July 1954. Following this tour, the Dance-Percussion Trio disbanded and the musicians added a second percussionist, Arnold Goldberg, thus forming a trio of two percussionists and a pianist. Shapiro was later replaced by Rolf Barnes, though he later rejoined the group.

The trio commissioned a number of new works from contemporary composers, including Harold Farberman (Variations for Percussion With Piano, 1954), Halim El-Dabh (Hindi-Yaat no. 1 and Tabla-Tahmeel no. 1, both 1959, and Tabla-Dance, 1961), and Gitta Steiner (Trio, 1969). They were one of the first American percussion ensembles to utilize traditional percussion instruments from India (including tabla and mridangam), which Gould brought back following a 1959 tour of that nation with The Little Orchestra Society of New York.

The group's primary focus was presenting percussion music to young people (ranging in age from kindergarten to the college level), with most of their performances arranged by the Young Audiences, Inc. organization of New York. Through their performances across the United States (3,000 in all), the group did much to promote percussion music to the general public. They released an LP recording, entitled Holidays for Percussion (Vox, 1958), and a film, Percussion, the Pulse of Music (produced by Arts and Audiences, Inc., for the Educational Television and Radio Center, 1957), and appeared on the I've Got a Secret television program, hosted by Steve Allen, on January 24, 1966, as well as several other television programs, particularly those for children.

In addition to their work with the trio, Goldberg and Gould served for many years as members of the New York City Ballet Orchestra and the orchestras of the Martha Graham Dance Company and Joffrey Ballet; Gould retired from his post with the New York City Ballet Orchestra in 2005 and Goldberg remains with the orchestra as timpanist and orchestra manager. Shapiro was also active as a pianist, orchestra conductor, and opera producer in South Korea, Hong Kong, and the United States.

In the 1960s, a Boston, Massachusetts-based group called the New Boston Percussion Ensemble, also comprising two percussionists (James Latimer and Everett Beale) and a pianist (Allen Barker), was formed. This group also performed programs for the Young Audiences organization and performed some of the same repertoire as the New York Percussion Trio.

== See also ==
- Abel-Steinberg-Winant Trio
