= Jack Rickard =

Jack Rickard self-portrait

Jack Rickard (March 8, 1922 – July 22, 1983) was an American illustrator for numerous advertising campaigns and multiple comic strips but was best known as a key contributor to Mad for more than two decades. Rickard's artwork appeared in more than 175 Mad issues, including 35 covers; he also illustrated sixteen Mad paperback covers.

After attending the Rochester Institute of Technology on an art scholarship, Rickard did commercial art for Chaite Studios in the 1950s. He illustrated covers for "men's magazines" such as "Adventure" and "True Detective", contributed to Charlton Comics and worked as an assistant on the Li'l Abner comic strip. Soon after, he became a mainstay in the advertising field, where his work attracted the attention of Mad's editors. He began illustrating for the humor magazine in 1961 and remained a regular until his death from cancer 22 years later.

== Comic strip ==
In 1966–1967, he collaborated with Mell Lazarus on a newspaper comic strip, Pauline McPeril (a.k.a. The Adventures of Pauline McPeril) for Publishers-Hall Syndicate. Lazarus used the pseudonym "Fulton" on this strip, which followed the misadventures of blonde secret agent McPeril.

== Mad ==
Jack Rickard cover for Mad #186 (October 1976)

Mad editor Nick Meglin commented, "I think of all the artists we've had, we miss Jack the most. Jack had so many styles, such a total command of all techniques. He was especially useful when we wanted something to have a real rounded, 3-D look to it." After Norman Mingo semi-retired in 1976, Rickard became Mad's main cover artist until his death seven years later.

He also illustrated for the original Mad paperbacks, including Frank Jacobs' Mad About Sports (1972). Some of his Mad work was reprinted in Richard Linklater's Dazed and Confused: Teenage Nostalgia. Instant and Cool 70's Memorabilia (MCA, 1993), a tie-in with Linklater's 1993 film, Dazed and Confused.

== Film posters ==
Rickard's style was in demand for film promotional artwork and posters. Among his numerous assignments, he created the poster art for two Sidney Poitier films, Uptown Saturday Night and Let's Do It Again, two Peter Sellers films, the 1963 film The Pink Panther and the 1974 Soft Beds, Hard Battles (a.k.a. Party for Hitler and Undercovers Hero), and the Tony Curtis and Jerry Lewis film Boeing Boeing. Rickard illustrated both the original film poster for Bob & Carol & Ted & Alice and its parody on the cover of Mad #137.
