= Jophery Brown =

American baseball player, actor (1945–2014)

- Pitcher
- Born: January 22, 1945; Grambling, Louisiana, U.S.
- Died: January 11, 2014 (aged 68); Inglewood, California, U.S.
- Batted: Left Threw: Right

MLB debut
- September 21, 1968, for the Chicago Cubs

Last MLB appearance
- September 21, 1968, for the Chicago Cubs

MLB statistics
- Win–loss record: 0–0
- Earned run average: 4.50
- Strikeouts: 0
- Stats at Baseball Reference

Teams
- Chicago Cubs (1968)

Jophery Clifford Brown (January 22, 1945 – January 11, 2014) was an American Major League Baseball pitcher who made one relief appearance for the Chicago Cubs. He became an award-winning stunt man and actor.

== Early life and family ==
Brown was born in Grambling, Louisiana, the seventh of eight children of Sylvester and Ida Mae (née Washington) Brown. His older brother, Calvin Brown, was a pioneering Black stuntman, a founding member of the Black Stuntmen's Association, and Bill Cosby's stunt double in the television series I Spy.

Brown attended Grambling High School and Grambling College (1964–1966). He did not graduate from Grambling, but he had a 12–2 win–loss record, with a 0.88 earned run average (ERA) and a shutout for the Grambling Tigers.

== Baseball career ==
Brown was drafted three times by major league teams, first by the Pittsburgh Pirates in 1965, then by the Boston Red Sox in 1966, before finally signing with the Cubs on June 20, 1966. He spent the next couple of years in the minor leagues. He made his only major league appearance on September 21, 1968, against Pittsburgh at Forbes Field. Brown relieved Bobby Tiefenauer, who had in turn relieved the Cubs' starter that day, Joe Niekro. He gave up two hits, including a single by Maury Wills, and issued an intentional walk to Roberto Clemente. He allowed one run in two innings of work, retiring opposing pitcher Dock Ellis on a line drive back to the mound for the final out of his debut. Brown was removed for pinch-hitter Clarence Jones in the next inning. He would never pitch in the majors again. The following season, he played in Double-A with San Antonio, going 9–10, and suffered a rotator cuff injury. He had played baseball only because his father loved the sport. His brother Calvin advised him to come out to Hollywood.

== Acting and stuntman career ==
Brown's first television role was uncredited as a police officer on a 1964 episode of Arrest and Trial titled "The Black Flower", courtesy of his brother Calvin. He first worked as a stunt man the next year on episodes of I Spy. Brown also played an uncredited role as a reporter on the 1965 I Spy episode "So Long, Patrick Henry".

His next work in Hollywood did not come until 1973 in Coffy, when Brown played uncredited roles as both a party guest and a stunt man. That began a 35-year career during which he acted in 35 films and performed stunts in 115. Brown worked in as many as seven movies in a year. Perhaps his best-known stunt is doubling for Sandra Bullock in the action film Speed and driving the bus over a freeway "gap"; in fact, he drove up a ramp and went airborne on an intact freeway, wearing a special harness to protect his vertebrae. Other career highlights included working as a stunt double for Morgan Freeman in three films: Along Came a Spider (2001), The Sum of All Fears (2002) and Dreamcatcher (2003). Brown was the stunt coordinator on seven motion pictures: The Bingo Long Traveling All-Stars & Motor Kings (1975), Scarface (1983), Action Jackson and Miracle at Beekman's Place (1988), Graffiti Bridge (1990), House Party 3 (1994), Sudden Death (1995), Sometimes They Come Back... Again (1996) and The Relic (1997). He also played the gatekeeper in Jurassic Park. His baseball background was helpful for Bingo Long, in which he worked both as stunt coordinator and as All-Stars third baseman Emory "Champ" Chambers; according to his wife Lois, it was one of his favorite films. Brown's last acting role was an uncredited part as a chef in Spider-Man (2002).

Recognition came in the form of a Taurus World Stunt Award for Best Work with a Vehicle, sharing the award with nine others for a car-chase scene in Bad Boys II (2003). Brown also was nominated with six others for a Screen Actors Guild Award for Outstanding Performance by a Stunt Ensemble in a Motion Picture in Wanted (2008). That was the last film in which he worked. In 2010, he was awarded the Taurus Lifetime Achievement Award for his stuntwork.

== Death ==
Jophery Brown died on January 11, 2014, at the age of 68 from complications related to a cancer treatment.

== Filmography ==
Year	Title	Role	Notes
1974	Uptown Saturday Night	Geechie Dan's Henchman	Uncredited
1974	Mixed Company	Basketball Player	
1975	Let's Do It Again	Bootney Farnsworth's Trainer	Uncredited
1976	The Bingo Long Traveling All-Stars & Motor Kings	Emory "Champ" Chambers, All-Star (3B)	
1978	Foul Play	Cop	
1980	The Hunter	Train Passenger	Uncredited
1982	Rocky III	Challenger #10	
1982	Annie	Punjab Double	
1983	Sudden Impact	Young Guy #3	
1985	Moving Violations	Baggage-Van	Uncredited
1987	The Squeeze	Poker Player #2	
1987	Real Men	Clown	Uncredited
1988	The Presidio	Workman #1	
1989	Kinjite: Forbidden Subjects	Duke's Thug	
1989	Cyborg	Mace, Saloon Owner / Pirate / Bandit	
1991	Stone Cold	Driver	Uncredited
1992	Stop! Or My Mom Will Shoot	Thug #4	
1992	Article 99	Admitting Guard	
1992	Universal Soldier	Thug	
1993	Nowhere to Run	Prisoner #2	
1993	Maniac Cop III: Badge of Silence	Degrazia	
1993	Joshua Tree	Snoozing Cop	
1993	Boiling Point	Edmund	
1993	Jurassic Park	Jophery Brown	Credited as Worker in Raptor Pen
1993	Extreme Justice	Vince	
1994	Speed	Bus Jump Driver	
1995	The Expert	Joe Himes	
1995	Sudden Death	Wootton	
1997	The Relic	Guard Frederick Ford	
2002	Spider-Man	Chef	Uncredited final film role
