= Uptown Saturday Night =

1974 film by Sidney Poitier

- Theatrical release poster by Jack Rickard
- Directed by: Sidney Poitier
- Written by: Richard Wesley
- Produced by: Melville Tucker
- Starring: Sidney Poitier; Bill Cosby; Harry Belafonte; Flip Wilson; Richard Pryor; Paula Kelly; Rosalind Cash; Roscoe Lee Browne; Johnny Sekka; Calvin Lockhart
- Cinematography: Fred J. Koenekamp
- Edited by: Pembroke J. Herring
- Music by: Tom Scott
- Production company: First Artists
- Distributed by: Warner Bros.
- Release dates: June 15, 1974 (New York); July 26, 1974 (United States)
- Running time: 104 minutes
- Country: United States
- Language: English
- Budget: $3 million (approx.)
- Box office: $6.7 million (rentals)

Uptown Saturday Night is a 1974 American action comedy and crime comedy film, written by Richard Wesley and directed by and starring Sidney Poitier, with Bill Cosby and Harry Belafonte co-starring. Cosby and Poitier teamed up again for Let's Do It Again (1975) and A Piece of the Action (1977). Although Cosby's and Poitier's characters have different names in each film, the three films are considered a trilogy. Uptown Saturday Night premiered on June 15, 1974, at the Criterion Theatre in New York and opened to positive reviews.

The plot of the film revolves around efforts to retrieve a stolen wallet, which contains a winning lottery ticket.

In 2024, the film was selected for preservation in the United States National Film Registry by the Library of Congress as being "culturally, historically, or aesthetically significant".

== Plot ==
While enjoying themselves at Madame Zenobia's club on Saturday night, Steve Jackson and Wardell Franklin are held up by robbers who raid the club and steal Steve's wallet. When they realize that a winning lottery ticket worth $50,000 is in the wallet, Steve and Wardell set out to find the crooks themselves with the help of gangster Geechie Dan Beauford, who wants to defeat his rival Silky Slim. Steve and Wardell devise a plan to recover the ticket.

== Cast ==
- Sidney Poitier as Steve Jackson, a steel-mill worker and tame family man. He is confident and flirtatious, and he will often take up challenges posed by his best friend Wardell. His wallet was stolen by Silky Slim at Madame Zenobia's.
- Bill Cosby as Wardell Franklin, a taxi driver and Steve's best friend. He has a carefree attitude, and will often act impulsively when presented with thrilling and exciting situations. He persuades Steve to go to Madame Zenobia's, and later to visit Sharp Eye Washington.
- Harry Belafonte as Dan "Geechie Dan" Beauford, a short-tempered gangster. Although he is tough and stubborn, he is also easily persuaded when money is involved. His rival is Silky Slim.
- Calvin Lockhart as Nickademus "Silky Slim" Williams, a lead gangster and rival of Geechie Dan. Driven by money, he and his crew rob everyone at Madame Zenobia's estate and steal cash and jewelry, including Steve's wallet.
- Flip Wilson as The Reverend
- Richard Pryor as "Sharp Eye" Washington
- Rosalind Cash as Sarah Jackson
- Roscoe Lee Browne as Congressman Chesley Lincoln
- Paula Kelly as Peggy "Leggy Peggy" / Mrs. Lincoln
- Lee Chamberlin as Madame Zenobia
- Johnny Sekka as Geechie's Henchman
- Lincoln Kilpatrick as Slim's Henchman #1
- Don Marshall as Slim's Henchman #2
- Ketty Lester as Irma Franklin
- Harold Nicholas as Seymour "Little Seymour"
- Paul Harris as Police Officer
- Jophery Brown as Geechie Dan's Henchman
- Richard L. Duran as Waldorf Patron

== Background ==
Uptown Saturday Night was produced by Warner Bros. in the midst of the blaxploitation film era along with films such as Cleopatra Jones and Black Belt Jones.

Throughout his career, Poitier was frustrated with Hollywood's portrayal of Black people in film and television, which motivated him to direct films during the blaxploitation era. The first film that he directed was Buck and the Preacher, in which he starred with Belafonte. Poitier then directed Uptown Saturday Night and its sequels, Let's Do It Again and A Piece of the Action.

== Themes ==
The characters in the film, while different in their motives and demeanor, have a sophisticated and classy appearance in the Black community (with the exception of Sharp Eye Washington). Poitier sought to represent Black actors on screen in an elegant manner in contrast to the usual image of Black people in Hollywood. During his career, he refused roles that enforced negative stereotypes, and chose to play characters who were "dignified, proud, and ethical". Critics have noted this pattern: "In all his films, [Poitier] was educated and intelligent. He spoke proper English, dressed conservatively, and had the best of table manners".

== Reception ==
Uptown Saturday Night grossed $7,400,000 in the US, surpassing its production cost of $2,500,000. It was on the list of top 50 highest-grossing films at #3, just three months after its release. The film received mixed-to-positive reviews upon release. Vincent Canby of the New York Times wrote that the film "is essentially a put-on, but it's so full of good humor and, when the humor goes flat, of such high spirits that it reduces movie criticism to the status of a most nonessential craft". Gene Siskel of the Chicago Tribune gave the film 3 stars out of 4, calling it "an old-style comedy revue in which each actor has his chance to crack up the audience with one big scene ... [Poitier] derives natural comedy through the simplest of actions, simply because he's Sidney Poitier. Whether it's waiting for a bus or calmly listening to a boastful friend, Poitier grabs our attention by letting us see him as a regular guy". Kevin Thomas of the Los Angeles Times called it "the funniest film since Blazing Saddles and surely one of the year's most enjoyable movies, the old-fashioned kind that leaves you feeling good when it's over". Penelope Gilliatt wrote that Richard Wesley's script "has managed to say something farcical with courageous and truthful underpinnings about Black ways of escape into a world that is full of far more fun than any that more privileged whites ever seem to create".

Among negative reviews, Gary Arnold of The Washington Post wrote that "while the film is a welcomed change from the many blaxploitation films of recent years, neither the vehicle nor the performers are able to get off the ground". Paul D. Zimmermann of Newsweek wrote: "Poitier is not an inventive comic talent — he is erratic behind the camera and amiable but not funny in front of it. When the funny set pieces stop, the film sputters — but not before delivering a carnival of fine comic characters". Variety called the film "uneven", opining that "too much of the time Uptown Saturday Night just lies there, impatiently waiting for more inventive comedy business and a zippier pace than the sober Poitier seems able to provide". Walter Burrell of Essence magazine wrote "one walks away a bit dissatisfied...One is left with the feeling these great talents could have used a vehicle more suited to their abilities". David McGillivray of The Monthly Film Bulletin wrote that "everyone tries so hard to affect a happy-go-lucky air, but the material is so feeble and Sidney Poitier's direction so uninspired that the performances of all but the urbane Roscoe Lee Browne look depressingly mediocre. It is difficult to see in Uptown Saturday Night anything but a colossal waste of talent".

== Television pilot ==
Shortly after the film's release, NBC commissioned a television pilot for a sitcom version of Uptown Saturday Night, starring Cleavon Little and Adam Wade, playing the respective roles played by Cosby and Poitier in the film. The pilot did not sell, though it was seen on NBC during the summer of 1979 as part of Comedy Theater, one of many showcases featuring unsold pilots.

== Sequels ==
Although indirect, the sequels are Let's Do It Again (1975), and A Piece of the Action (1977). They also garnered mixed reviews from critics, partly due to the fall of the blaxploitation era.

Let's Do It Again (1975) was written by Richard Wesley and directed by Poitier. The first sequel to Uptown Saturday Night features Poitier and Cosby again on the same screen as Clyde Williams (Poitier) and Billy Foster (Cosby). Many members of the previous film return and play different roles, including Lee Chamberlin and Calvin Lockhart. The film relies primarily on slapstick comedy, compared to Uptown Saturday Night which had verbal wit comedy. The film was met with mostly negative reviews. Stephen Klain of Independent Film Journal wrote: "As he did in the previous film, Poitier had given himself relatively little to do as an actor, preferring to let the camera linger on Cosby, who lets all stops out". Richard Eder of The New York Times opined that "the movie's main strength is Bill Cosby, who looks like a starved sheep in wolf's clothing, as is shifty and woebegone at the same time". In spite of reviews, it grossed $11,800,800 in North America, surpassing Uptown Saturday Night in revenue.

A Piece of the Action (1977) was written by Charlies Blackwill and directed by Poitier. Poitier and Cosby return as Manny Durrell and Dave Anderson. Like its predecessor, it primarily uses slapstick comedy. It gained fairly positive reviews from critics. David Ansen of Newsweek wrote: "Corny and hip, cynical and sentimental, formulaic and funky, A Piece of the Action may have a medicinal intent, but it goes down like ice cream soda". It grossed $6,700,000 domestically.

== Soundtrack ==
The music for Uptown Saturday Night was written by composers Tom Scott and Morgan Ames. It was produced and arranged by Van McCoy. It was released in late 1974, with a duration time of 6 minutes and 23 seconds. The opening song, performed by Dobie Gray, is very upbeat, with themes of self-preservation and happiness. The recurring song throughout the film and credits convey self-determination, a motive that reflects the Black Power movement, with the lyrics "I gotta hold on".

== Remake ==
In 2002, Will Smith and his production company, Overbrook Entertainment, bought the rights to the trilogy for remakes to star Smith and to be distributed by Warner Bros. Smith hoped to get Eddie Murphy, Martin Lawrence and other famous African-American stars for the films. In 2012, Adam McKay was attached to direct the remake, based on a script by Just Go with It screenwriter Tim Dowling, with Smith and Denzel Washington in the leads. There have been no updates since early 2014, when Nicholas Stoller was re-writing the screenplay, with McKay, Smith and Washington still attached. In 2018, Kevin Hart was attached to star in the remake with a script written by Black-ish creator Kenya Barris.

== See also ==
- List of American films of 1974
