= Michael Milenski =

American opera director (born 1941)

- Born: Victor Michael Milenski; 1941 (age 84–85); Cortez, Colorado, U.S.
- Education: University of Colorado; University of California, Berkeley
- Known for: Founding Long Beach Opera

Victor Michael Milenski (born 1941) founded the Long Beach Opera in 1979, and was its general director for 25 seasons, retiring in 2004. Though local opera companies had been organized in the 1920s and 1960s in metropolitan Los Angeles, under Milenski’s direction the Long Beach Opera became the first professional opera company to take root in the modern era and survive. Having predated the formation of Los Angeles Opera and Orange County's Opera Pacific, Long Beach Opera is the Los Angeles area's oldest standing professional opera company.

Milenski was born in Cortez, Colorado, United States. A music graduate of the University of Colorado, he abandoned his doctoral work in Italian Studies at UC Berkeley to join the San Francisco Opera's Merola Training Program in the early 1970s. Rising through the ranks of the company's technical and production departments, he was tapped by the San Jose Symphony to produce Bizet's Carmen in the 1977–78 season and Verdi's La Traviata the following season.

In the meantime, the management of the Long Beach Symphony invited Milenski to mount his Traviata production under the aegis of Long Beach Grand Opera in March, 1979. With the success of that venture, Milenski quickly established the company independent of the Symphony and undertook a trial period of presenting standard operatic repertoire.

In the early 1980s, Milenski became more widely known to the American opera community for introducing revisionist and deconstructive opera productions into the United States, and for exploring repertory outside mainstream American operatic offerings. His 1983–84 productions of Britten's Death in Venice and Monteverdi's Coronation of Poppea starring Catherine Malfitano established the Long Beach Opera as a maverick presenter of alternative artistic vision.

As a producer, Milenski was an iconoclast, remaining apart from the American operatic establishment. Los Angeles Philharmonic executive director Ernest Fleischmann noted that Milenski established a benchmark for progressive programming and daring production that invigorated the entire Southern California performing arts community.

Among his operatic legacies, Milenski stimulated the careers of stage directors Christopher Alden and Julian Webber, and he gave his daughter Isabel Milenski her directorial debut with Peri’s Euridice in a 2001 production at the Getty Museum commemorating the 400th anniversary of the “first” opera.

Michael Milenski has been a proponent of composer Gian Carlo Menotti's opera The Saint Of Bleecker Street
