= Every Nigger Is a Star =

- Film poster
- Directed by: Calvin Lockhart
- Starring: Calvin Lockhart; Mia Feola; Boris Gardiner; Alfred Fagon
- Cinematography: William Greaves
- Music by: Boris Gardiner
- Release date: 1974
- Language: English

Every Nigger Is a Star is a 1974 blaxploitation film directed and starring Calvin Lockhart with cinematography by William Greaves. It is considered to be a lost film.

The original film soundtrack was composed by musician Boris Gardiner. In 2015, Gardiner's song from the soundtrack, "Every Nigger Is a Star" was sampled on Kendrick Lamar's song "Wesley's Theory", the opening track of Lamar's album, To Pimp a Butterfly. The song also opens the 2016 Oscar winning film for Best Picture, Moonlight.

== Plot ==
A man meets some of the most famous reggae bands when he returns to his home in Jamaica.

== History ==
The film was released in Nassau, Bahamas and Kingston, Jamaica. It was reported that director and star Calvin Lockhart made the film as an attempt to display black creativity in a wide range of ways.

According to the film's composer Boris Gardiner, the film was the idea of the owners of the Kingston nightclub The Bronco, Teddy McCook and Eddie Knight. Gardiner's group the Boris Gardiner Happening was the house band at The Bronco. McCook and Knight met with Calvin Lockhart to make the film and approached Gardiner to write the music for the film with his brother.

Media reports stated that both Gardiner and Lockhart sought to use the film and theme song to change the meaning of the word "nigger" and take away its negativity.

== Legacy ==
Film director Barry Jenkins chose to open his film Moonlight with the movie's theme song upon hearing it, Jenkins was quoted as saying, "I was on some blog and read the actual story of that song. It was taken from a blaxploitation film in the ’70s, and I thought that the purpose of that film aligned with the purpose of our film—that these lives are valid and they’re worth exploring."
