= A Piece of the Action (film) =

1977 film by Sidney Poitier

- Theatrical release poster
- Directed by: Sidney Poitier
- Screenplay by: Charles Blackwell
- Story by: Timothy March
- Produced by: Melville Tucker
- Starring: Sidney Poitier; Bill Cosby; James Earl Jones; Denise Nicholas; Hope Clarke; Tracy Reed; Titos Vandis
- Cinematography: Donald M. Morgan
- Edited by: Pembroke J. Herring
- Music by: Curtis Mayfield
- Production company: First Artists
- Distributed by: Warner Bros. Pictures
- Release date: October 7, 1977
- Running time: 135 minutes
- Country: United States
- Language: English

A Piece of the Action is a 1977 American crime comedy film directed by and starring Sidney Poitier and co-starring Bill Cosby. It was the third film pairing of Poitier and Cosby, following Uptown Saturday Night (1974) and Let's Do It Again (1975). The films are considered a trilogy, even though the actors play new characters in each film. It was also Poitier's last acting role for more than a decade, as he focused his attentions on directing. The film focuses on two high-class thieves who have managed to evade arrests. A retired detective blackmails them into working for a youth center and into assisting in the reformation of juvenile delinquents.

== Plot ==
Dave Anderson and Manny Durrell are two high-class criminals in Chicago who have never been caught. Dave is shown at the beginning of the film displaying his expert safecracking skills and burglarizing a large firm, obtaining a large sum of money before making a dramatic escape by jumping from a high window into the back of a covered van. Manny is an expert con man who devises a scheme to swindle Bruno, a notorious gangster, out of nearly half a million dollars, by staging a fake police raid and using a woman named Bea Quitman to pose as Bruno's maid. When the fake police arrive, Bruno gives Bea a briefcase full of money to hide, which she promptly disappears with. Investigating both crimes at the times of their occurrence is police detective Joshua Burke, along with his partner Ty Shorter.

Sometime after both robberies, Burke has retired from the police force, Manny is living with his girlfriend Nikki off the proceeds of his previous swindle, and Dave owns a successful nightclub. Dave and Manny then both separately receive a note instructing them to meet at a hotel the following day; when they arrive, at first they are suspicious as each thinks the other is the one who summoned them. When the phone rings, a deep voice reminds them both of the details of their previous crimes, and instructs them to meet again at a posh restaurant the next day, where the reasons for the notes and meetings will be given.

At the restaurant, both Manny and Dave are surprised by Lila French, who is the coordinator at an inner-city youth center that focuses on helping teenagers in the slums find and obtain employment. Unaware of the real reason for their involvement, Lila is excited and enthusiastic at what she perceives to be the philanthropic largesse of the two men. During their lunch, Dave and Manny receive another phone call, where the same deep voice instructs them as to what their options are: either spend time at the youth center for the next five years to help the teens find jobs, or else he will use the information he has to send them to prison. Both Dave and Manny reluctantly agree.

At the youth center, Lila introduces the two men to Sarah Thomas, a caring but overwhelmed teacher, who is in charge of a very rowdy class of inner-city youth, who have no hesitation in disrespecting either her, or Manny and Dave. Manny and Dave do a coin toss to see who will be assigned to handle the kids; Manny "loses" the coin toss, so he will be handling the teenagers with Miss Thomas, while Dave works on finding the kids jobs via his various contacts. During this time, Dave is also tasked with trying to pry information from Lila, as to the potential identity of the caller with the deep voice, so they can find a way to get themselves out of their current predicament.

Manny slowly but surely begins to win the teens over to his side, by telling them they are on "salary" and that they now work for him, at the pay rate of $100 a week, with the "job" being that they begin to take learning how to get an actual job seriously while they're at the center. When the kids say he promised them half their salary up front, he agrees, and then proceeds to rip the stack of $100 bills for the kids in half; he then hands the kids one half of the bill, saying they will get the other half at the end of the week.

Dave manages to obtain prospective jobs for the teens, as well as working on a mutual attraction between himself and Lila, planning to charm her in order to find out more information. During a conversation in her office one day, she casually points out that her predecessor started the youth center, showing Dave a wall of photos kept in her predecessor's honor. She gives the woman's name as Martha Burke, stating that she'd recently died, and points out a photo of Martha next to her husband: retired detective Joshua Burke. Dave obtains Burke's phone number, and when he and Manny call him, Burke's greetings over the phone confirm that he is the man with the deep voice they are looking for.

Meanwhile, Bruno is still looking for the person who swindled him out of his money, and uses the leverage he has over Ty Shorter (who owes Bruno money due to gambling debts) to try and obtain information. Shorter brings a series of mugshots over for Bruno to look at, and although he doesn't recognize any of the men, he does recognize a woman: Bea Quitman, who has relocated to Copenhagen with her share of the money she helped Manny steal. Shorter also gives Bruno information on Bea's family, including her grandson. Bruno then intimidates Bea into finding Manny for him, which she does when she looks him up at the youth center. Bruno then kidnaps Manny's girlfriend Nikki, and threatens her safety unless Dave returns all the money he stole back to him. Although Manny initially tries to keep Dave out of his own problem, Dave insists on helping, and they visit Burke directly at his house, asking for his assistance.

While initially reluctant, Burke eventually agrees to help, after Lila (who has been told everything by Dave and Manny) admonishes him, saying his late wife would never have approved of his blackmailing Dave and Manny to work at the center. He then confronts Ty Shorter at the police station, telling his old partner and friend that while he knows all about his gambling debts with Bruno, he knows that Bruno will never let him pay them off as long as he can use Shorter's access to police information. He further informs Shorter that he will conveniently forget Shorter's involvement with Bruno once he has the information he needs.

After Burke calls them with the information he got from Shorter, Dave and Manny first stage a robbery, clearing out a large amount of money from an office building vault while posing as janitors; they then break into the wine cellar of a monastery; after leaving they are confronted by a monk (and a barking dog that chases them).

Bruno phones Manny to arrange a meetup, where Manny will return the money; Burke, Lila, and Dave accompany him. Manny is then forced into the car of Bruno's henchmen, after giving them the money, while Nikki is released and taken back to Lila's office by the others. Manny is then taken to see Bruno, telling him he doesn't have all his money; he then proceeds to point out how Bruno's drug dealing and prostitution is no different than his swindling Bruno out of the money. An amused Bruno points out that Manny embarrassed him; growing irate, he then loudly yells that the money in the briefcase means nothing to him, throwing it around, before discovering what else Manny has in the briefcase for him: copies of letters and documents detailing his illegal businesses, tax fraud, and his potential involvement in mob hits, all of which Bruno had stashed at the monastery to prevent the authorities from getting their hands on the information. Manny further points out that he has numerous copies of the documents stashed around town, and offers Bruno a deal: stop dealing drugs in South Chicago, and let him walk away from their situation clean. Bruno reluctantly agrees to the deal.

After explaining the details of his arrangement with Bruno to the others, they are interrupted by a distraught Miss Thomas and the sounds of gunshots. Running to the classroom, they see what looks like one of the students having been shot by another, only to discover it was a prank the class pulled on them as part of their "commencement exercises", as they graduate from the youth center's employment program. The previously hostile class then presents Lila, Miss Thomas, Dave and Manny with gifts. Lila and Miss Thomas then inform a reluctant Dave and Manny that they have twenty-three new students arriving the following week, as the graduating class throws themselves a party, with all the adults present joining the teens in dancing in celebration.

== Cast ==
- Sidney Poitier as Manny Durrell
- Bill Cosby as Dave Anderson
- James Earl Jones as Joshua Burke
- Denise Nicholas as Lila French
- Hope Clarke as Sarah Thomas
- Tracy Reed as Nikki McLean
- Titos Vandis as Vic Bruno
- Frances Foster as Bea Quitman
- Pat Renella as Nikos
- Jason Evers as Ty Shorter
- Marc Lawrence as Louie
- Ja'net Dubois as Nellie Bond
- Ernest Lee Thomas as John
- Sheryl Lee Ralph as Barbara Hanley
- Estelle Evans as Alberta Ballard

== Reception ==
Roger Ebert gave the film two stars out of four and wrote: "It has its heart in the right place, I suppose, but its key situations are so unbelievable and its dialog so awkward that nothing helps". Lawrence Van Gelder of The New York Times wrote: "A Piece of the Action is firmly on the side of the angels. It is possible to criticize its lack of originality and its transparent slickness; but these are flaws that must be balanced against its evident craftsmanship, its entertainment and its social conscience". Arthur D. Murphy of Variety noted that "the Warner Bros. release, easygoing and pleasant if longish at 134 minutes, looks good for the general market". Gene Siskel gave the film two stars out of four and called it "a patronizing, simple-minded lecture on how young blacks can get jobs. You probably thought A Piece of the Action was going to be a comedy. It is, but only as an afterthought". Kevin Thomas of the Los Angeles Times praised the film as "uproarious yet poignant", with "generous, spirited direction" from Poitier. Gary Arnold of The Washington Post called the film "a winning light entertainment" with "an exceptionally effective screenplay, which achieves a spirited, tangy blend of conventional caper melodrama, conventional romantic comedy and elonquent propagandizing on behalf of measures intended to encourage self-reliance and self-respect in black juveniles".

== Remake ==
In 2002, Will Smith and his production company, Overbrook Entertainment, bought the rights to the trilogy for remakes to star Smith and to be distributed by Warner Bros. Pictures. Smith hoped to get Eddie Murphy, Martin Lawrence and other famous African-American stars for the films.

== See also ==
- List of American films of 1977
