= Calvin Lockhart =

Bahamian actor (1934–2007)

- Lockhart, 1971
- Born: Bert McClossy Cooper; October 18, 1934; Nassau, Bahamas
- Died: March 29, 2007 (aged 72); Nassau, Bahamas
- Education: Cooper Union School of Engineering
- Occupation: Actor
- Years active: 1960–2007
- Spouse(s): (?-?; divorced) Thelma Walters (m. 1972; div. 1978) Lynn Sloan (m. 1982; div. 1987) Jennifer Miles (m. 2006)
- Children: 2

Calvin Lockhart (born Bert McClossy Cooper; October 18, 1934 – March 29, 2007) was a Bahamian actor. Lockhart was perhaps best known for his roles as Reverend Deke O'Malley in the 1970 film Cotton Comes to Harlem and Biggie Smalls in the 1975 Warner Bros. film Let's Do It Again.

== Early life ==
Lockhart was born Bert McClossy Cooper, the youngest of eight children in Nassau, Bahamas. Lockhart's father was Eric Cooper (1912/1913–1976), a Bahamian tailor. Lockhart moved to New York City, New York, when he was 18. He spent one year at the Cooper Union School of Engineering, then left to pursue an acting career. He drove a taxi and operated a carpentry business in the borough of Queens while trying to establish a career as an actor.

== Career ==
In 1960, Lockhart made his Broadway debut, playing a gang leader in The Cool World (a dramatization of Warren Miller's novel of the same name), which closed after just two performances. Lockhart then travelled to Italy and formed his own theatre company in which he both acted and directed, before moving to West Germany and then England, where he landed various roles on British television and small roles in films such as 1966's Talking to a Stranger, where he played Judi Dench's character's husband, and 1968's A Dandy in Aspic and Salt and Pepper.

Lockhart's first notable screen role was in Joanna, a 1968 film about an interracial romance, set in London. Joanna was directed by Michael Sarne, who subsequently cast Lockhart in the notorious Myra Breckinridge. Lockhart's first lead role in a film was in Halls of Anger (1970), playing a former basketball star who becomes vice-principal of an Anerican inner-city high school to which 60 white students are being moved. An article in The New York Times that year described Lockhart as having "matinee-idol looks" with "chiseled-out-of-marble features" and "skin the color of brown velvet". He also starred in Cotton Comes to Harlem (1970, based on the Chester Himes novel of the same name) as the Reverend Deke O'Malley. In 1974, Lockhart became an actor-in-residence at the Royal Shakespeare Company in Stratford-upon-Avon. In the 1980s, he was a guest star for seven episodes in the American prime-time soap opera Dynasty, playing Jonathan Lake. He is familiar to horror film fans after his performance as the millionaire big-game hunter in The Beast Must Die (1974), and for his small appearances in two films by David Lynch, Wild at Heart (1990) and Twin Peaks: Fire Walk with Me (1992). Also in 1990, Lockhart made an appearance as the Jamaican drug lord King Willie in Predator 2.

== Later life ==
Lockhart headed a Los Angeles campaign called "Getting Off Drugs," an anti-drug effort to get teenagers off drugs in the late 1970s. Lockhart returned to the Bahamas in the late 1990s and worked as a director on several productions of the Freeport Players Guild. Lockhart's last film role was in Rain, a movie that was shot in the Bahamas and was released in 2007.

== Death ==
Lockhart died on March 29, 2007, in a Nassau hospital from stroke-related complications, at the age of 72.

== Personal life ==
Lockhart was married three times and had two sons. In 1972, he married Jamaican model Thelma Walters; they divorced in 1978. In August 1982, Lockhart married British businesswoman Lynn Sloan in the Bahamas; they later divorced. Calvin met his third wife Jennifer Miles in 1979 which led to the birth of actor Julien Lockhart Miles in 1981. The couple officially married 25 years later in 2006. Julien walking his mother down the aisle. In addition to Julien, Lockhart has another son named Leslie Lockhart.

== Pop culture ==
Lockhart character's name in the 1975 film Let's Do It Again, Biggie Smalls, was used by musical artist Christopher Wallace for his 1991 demo, and was still used by media and friends after a lawsuit forced Wallace to change it to The Notorious B.I.G.

== Filmography ==
=== Film ===
Year	Title	Role	Notes
1961	Venere creola	Melchiorre	
1963	Cleopatra	Minor Role (uncredited)	
1967	Drums Along the Avon	Bus Driver	
1968	Dark of the Sun	President Mwamini Ubi	Released in the UK as The Mercenaries
1968	A Dandy in Aspic	Brogue	
1968	Joanna	Gordon	
1968	Only When I Larf	Ali Lin	
1968	Salt and Pepper	Jones	
1968	Nobody Runs Forever	Jamaica	Also known as The High Commissioner
1970	Leo the Last	Roscoe, The Pimp	
1970	Halls of Anger	Quincy Davis	
1970	Cotton Comes to Harlem	Deke "Reverend" O'Malley	
1970	Myra Breckinridge	Irving Amadeus	
1972	Melinda	Frankie J. Parker	
1973	Le Grabuge	Pablo	Also known as Hung Up
1973	Contratto carnale	Ruma / Kofi	Also known as Only Love Defies
1974	Every Nigger Is a Star		Acted and directed
1974	The Beast Must Die	Tom Newcliffe	
1974	Uptown Saturday Night	Silky Slim	
1974	Honeybaby, Honeybaby	Liv	
1975	Let's Do It Again	"Biggie" Smalls	
1975	The Marijuana Affair		
1977	The Baron	Jason	
1980	The Baltimore Bullet	Snow White	
1988	Coming to America	Colonel Izzi	
1990	Wild at Heart	Reggie	
1990	Predator 2	Willie "King Willie"	
1992	Twin Peaks: Fire Walk with Me	The Electrician	
2008	Rain	Samuel	
2014	Twin Peaks: The Missing Pieces	The Electrician	Final film role; scenes filmed in 1992

=== Television ===
Year	Title	Role	Notes
1965	Family Christmas		
1966	The Corridor People	Theobald Aboo	Episode: "Victim as Black"
1966	Talking to a Stranger	Leonard Ngana	2 episodes
1966	The Power Game	Kofe Lokwe	2 episodes
1965-1967	Thirty-Minute Theatre	Mark	Episode: "Family Christmas"
1965-1967	Thirty-Minute Theatre	Leonard	Episode: "Magnolia Summer"
1965-1967	Thirty-Minute Theatre	Johnny	Episode: "Go Tell It on Table Mountain"
1967	Girl in a Black Bikini	Lee Anderson	3 episodes
1967	Rainbow City	Youth Leader	Episode: "What Sort of a Boy?"
1967	Escape	Kingsley Cavanaugh	Episode: "Five Men for Freedom"
1968	The Wednesday Play	Bus Driver	Episode: "Drums Along the Avon"
1968	The Wednesday Play	Damon Page	Episode: "Light Blue"
1969	Mogul	Zeke Nkosi	Episode: "You Want a Clockwork Nightingale"
1969	Plays of Today	Akanu	Episode: "Beyond the Sunrise"
1970	Confession	Man	Episode: "Neighbours"
1972	Play for Today	Jonathan	Episode: "The Beautiful Caribbean"
1972	Softly Softly: Task Force	Jake Johnson	Episode: "Set Us Alight"
1974	Get Christie Love!	Emperor	Episode: "Emperor of Death Street"
1978	Good Times	Raymond, Florida Evans' Gambler Cousin	
1978	Starsky & Hutch	Allen "Angel" Walter	Episode: "Cover Girl"
1979	Good Times	Cousin Raymond Brown	Episode: "Cousin Raymond"
1985-1986	Dynasty	Jonathan Lake	7 episodes
1989	1st & Ten	Moses Jackson's Agent	Episode: "Final Bow"
