= Christopher Alden (director) =

American theater and opera director

Christopher Alden (born 1949 in New York) is an American theater and opera director. He is the twin brother of David Alden, also an opera director. Both brothers belong to a generation of modernist directors, including Robert Wilson and Peter Sellars who are known for staging revisionist opera productions.

== Early life ==
Alden and his identical twin David came from a show business family. Their father was the playwright Jerome Alden, and their mother was the Broadway dancer Barbara Gaye. As such, the brothers were drawn to musical theater from an early age. As eight-year-olds, they listened to recordings of Gilbert & Sullivan operetta, and as teenagers in the mid-'60s, they frequently bought standing room tickets at the Metropolitan Opera. By age 13, both had decided they wanted to be directors of opera.

Alden studied theater at the University of Pennsylvania and began his stage career as an actor, appearing in Joseph Papp’s New York Shakespeare Festival production of Two Gentlemen of Verona in the early 70s. But he was soon apprenticed to opera director Jean-Pierre Ponnelle, working as his assistant in Houston, Paris, and Salzburg. In 1974, Alden staged his first opera productions in New York (Francis Poulenc's Les mamelles de Tirésias) and Omaha (La Traviata and The Barber of Seville). More assignments followed during the 1970s at Santa Fe Opera, Opera Theatre of St. Louis and Dallas Opera as well as a continuing relationship with Opera Omaha.

== Directing career ==
In 1982, Michael Milenski of Long Beach Opera engaged Alden to mount a conventional staging of La Boheme. However, the following year saw a surreal production of Benjamin Britten's Death in Venice that was a critical and artistic breakthrough for both Alden and Long Beach Opera. Los Angeles Times music critic Martin Bernheimer wrote that "Alden tells the story with shadows and hints... Guided by the music, he uses people as scenery and ideas as costumes. To illustrate the central philosophical conflicts between Apollo and Dionysus, the director introduces daring images unimagined by the composer and librettist."

Alden continued to collaborate with Long Beach Opera, which yielded some unconventional settings of Claudio Monteverdi's Coronation of Poppea, Orfeo and The Return of Ulysses; Britten’s The Rape of Lucretia; Jacques Offenbach's La Vie parisienne and Bluebeard and the world premiere of Stewart Wallace and Michael Korie's Hopper’s Wife.

In the early 1990s, he began a relationship with the San Francisco Opera, staging the American premieres of Aribert Reimann's Ghost Sonata and Hans Werner Henze's Das Verratene Meer as well as new productions of Les Contes d'Hoffmann, Coronation of Poppea, Virgil Thomson's The Mother of Us All and Wallace & Korie's Harvey Milk.

He made his debut with New York City Opera as early as 1979 with a staging of Gioachino Rossini's Le comte Ory and went on to create productions for NYCO and Glimmerglass Opera that included Handel's Imeneo, The Rape of Lucretia, The Mother of Us All, Bluebeard, The Italian Girl in Algiers, John Philip Sousa's The Glass Blowers, Mozart's Don Giovanni. He is currently working on a new production of Leonard Bernstein's A Quiet Place scheduled to make its New York premiere in October 2010.

Alden has worked with several major and regional American opera companies, including Lyric Opera of Chicago, Houston Grand Opera, Seattle Opera, Boston Lyric Opera, Pittsburgh Opera, Dallas Opera and Los Angeles Opera. He created the world premiere production of Anthony Davis' Tania at Philadelphia's American Music Theater Festival in 1992. He mounted Jonathan Dove's reduced versions of Das Rheingold and Die Walküre for the Eos Orchestra of New York in 2002-2004. For the Spoleto Festival USA, he produced the American premiere of Gluck's L'Ile de Merlin in 2007.

His work in Europe has encompassed assignments at Welsh National Opera, Scottish Opera (where he directed the world premiere of David Horne's Friend of the People), English National Opera (staging The Makropulos Case with Charles Mackerras in 2006). He and British director David Pountney co-directed Eight Little Greats, an acclaimed series of eight short operas for Opera North in 2005. Alden has also worked at the Opéra Comique in Paris (where he presented a triple bill of Georges Bizet's Djamileh, Le docteur Miracle and Don Procopio), Cologne Opera, Opera Zuid in The Netherlands as well as in Bilbao, Antwerp, Mannheim, Karlsruhe and Geneva.

== Modernist Vision ==
As an opera director, Christopher Alden is known for his use of contemporary imagery and, on occasion, a minimalist visual style, though never as spare as his contemporary Robert Wilson. He likened his own 1984 production of Coronation of Poppea to "a new wave rock video" and has frequently expressed his desire to connect the inner world of opera theater to the modern sensibility of a younger audience. He has an eye for bold theatrical gestures that are often dramatically effective but sometimes considered crass. His use of overt sexuality, brutal violence and over-the-top, satirical humor has soured his relationship with conservative patrons (most notably, a critically derided Rigoletto production for Chicago Lyric that the company declared un-"revivable").

Though some opera audiences may be put off by his art, it is never Alden’s aim to shock for the sake of shock value. Rather, his approach to stagecraft — with its anachronistic cultural symbols, blood-and-guts characterizations and eye-catching visuals — is driven by a desire to reveal how powerfully opera stories can resonate with modern experience. Alden has said that "however fascinating the era in which an opera was composed may be, I have a primary responsibility to the world we live in now."
