= Kevin Maynor =

American opera singer

Kevin Maynor is an American opera singer. In 1985, Maynor made his debut with the New York City Opera.

Maynor has sung with the Lyric Opera of Chicago, the Scottish Opera, the Opera National du Rhin, Opera Company of Boston, Florida Grand Opera, Pittsburgh opera, and the Dallas Opera. As a bass singer, Maynor has sung at Carnegie Hall, and the Metropolitan Opera House in L'enfant et les Sortilege by Maurice Ravel. Maynor was an apprentice artist at the Bolshoi Opera in Moscow in 1979.

Maynor has recorded with Telarc, Qualiton, Guild, Sony Music Beijing, New World Records and Fleur de son. Maynor has been called "a super voice". The singer was praised for his beautifully resonant tone. He has sung pieces by Verdi and Mozart and was often recognized from being cast in Wagner's Ring Cycle (Scottish Opera, Teatro Municipal de Santiago, Dallas opera, Lyric Opera Austin).

Maynor is resident of Trilogy: An Opera Company, in Newark, New Jersey.

== Discography ==
- Paul Robeson Remembered (1998)
- The Black Art Song (2000)
- The Low Bass (2002)
- Songs of America from Another American (2003)
