= Andreas Mitisek =

Andreas Mitisek was the Artistic and General Director of Long Beach Opera from 2003 to 2020 and the General Director of Chicago Opera Theater from 2012 to 2016. After his conducting debut with the company in Henry Purcell's The Indian Queen in 1998, Mitisek served as conductor, stage director and designer for many Long Beach Opera productions.

== Biography ==
He is conductor, stage director and designer of many Long Beach Opera and Chicago Opera Theater productions. His site-specific productions in parking garages, swimming pools, night clubs, warehouses and the Port of Los Angeles have become a successful hallmark. Andreas Mitisek became LBO's principal conductor in 1998 and Artistic and General Director in 2004. Under Mitisek's leadership, LBO grew from 2 to 5 operas per season. By exploring unorthodox venues, he has been able to attract new audiences for opera and uphold LBO's artistic vision by presenting 20th century and rare works.

Mitisek serves on the board of directors for OPERA AMERICA, the national service organization for US opera companies. He has been named by Opera News as one of the 25 people that will be a major force in the field of opera in the coming decade. Mitisek was named LA Tastemaker by LA Times Magazine in 2009, Arts Leader of the Year by the Long Beach Arts Council in 2009 and was highlighted as one of the “2012 People” by LA WEEKLY. In 2014 he was named "Chicagoan of the Year in Classical Music" by the Chicago Tribune.

A native of Austria, he served as music director of the Wiener Operntheater from 1990 – 1997, the foremost contemporary opera company in Austria. Mitisek has conducted at the Wiener Volksoper, the Komische Oper in Berlin, the festival "Wien Modern", the Wiener Konzerthaus and Musikverein, and others. He is also sought after as a guest conductor in North America, leading productions for the Seattle Opera, Opera Company of Philadelphia, Vancouver Opera, Austin Lyric Opera, Hawaii Opera Theater, Opera Theatre of St. Louis among others.

He staged the East Coast premiere composer Stewart Wallace's and librettist Michael Korie's “Hopper’s Wife” for the New York City Opera This surreal erotically charged 90-minute 1997 chamber opera fantasy about an imagined marriage between the painter Edward Hopper and the gossip columnist Hedda Hopper premiered at Harlem Stage April 28 with performances through May 1, 2016.

In June 2019 he conducted the world premiere of The Central Park Five for the Long Beach Opera; the opera won the Pulitzer Prize for Music in May 2020.
