= Richard Felciano =

American composer (1930–2026)

Richard James Felciano (December 7, 1930 – February 21, 2026) was an American composer.

== Life and career ==
Felciano was born in Santa Rosa, California on December 7, 1930. He studied at San Francisco State College where he received his BA in 1952. In the same year he also obtained an MA from Mills College, where he studied composition with Darius Milhaud. He continued his studies with Milhaud at the Paris Conservatoire, where he received two diplomas in 1955, and went on to study privately in Florence for a year (1958–59) with Luigi Dallapiccola. He also earned a PhD from the University of Iowa in 1959. He taught at Lone Mountain College and the University of California, Berkeley, before becoming composer-in-residence for the city of Boston from 1971 until 1973.

Felciano died in San Francisco on February 21, 2026, at the age of 95.

== Compositions ==
- Evolutions, for clarinet and piano (1962)
- Sir Gawain and the Green Knight, chamber opera (1964)
- Gravities, for piano four-hands (1965)
- Contractions, mobile for wind quintet (1965)
- Mutations, for orchestra (1966)
- Spectra, for flute ensemble and contrabass (1967)
- God of the Expanding Universe, for organ and electronics (1971)
- Galactic Rounds, for orchestra (1972)
- EKĀGRATA, for organ, two percussionists, and electronics (1972), written for the 1972 International Contemporary Organ Music Festival.
- In Celebration of Golden Rain, for gamelan and organ (1977)
- Islands of Sound, an environment for multiple carillons (1977)
- The Tuning of the Sky, for carillon (1978)
- Come Away With Me: Kindertotenlieder, for solo Renaissance recorders (1 player) and electronic sounds (1984)
- Dark Landscape, for English horn (1985)
- Lontano, for harp and piano (1986)
- Concerto for Organ and Orchestra (1986)
- Berliner Feuerwerksmusik, for three mobile carillons (1987)
- Constellations, for multiple brass quintets, horn ensemble, and organ (1987)
- Shadows, for flute, clarinet, piano, percussion, violin, and cello (1987)
- Masks, for flute and trumpet (1989)
- Palladio, for violin, piano, and percussion (1989)
- Primal Balance, for flute and contrabass (1991)
- Camp Songs, for orchestra (1992)
- Cante jondo, for clarinet, bassoon, and piano (1993)
- Symphony, for string orchestra (1993)
- Overture concertante, for clarinet and orchestra (1995)
- String Quartet (1995)
- Prelude, for piano (1997)

== Sources ==
- Christiansen, Sigurd Olaf. 1977. "The Sacred Choral Music of Richard Felciano: An Analytic Study". DMA Diss. Urbana: University of Illinois at Urbana-Champaign.
- Hersh, Howard. 2001. "Felciano, Richard (James)". The New Grove Dictionary of Music and Musicians, second edition, edited by Stanley Sadie and John Tyrrell. London: Macmillan.
