= Long Beach Opera =

Opera company in California, U.S.

Long Beach Opera is a Southern California opera company serving the greater Los Angeles and Orange County metroplex. Founded in 1979, it is the oldest continually running opera company in the L.A. area. In June 2019 LBO presented the world premiere of The Central Park Five, an opera by Anthony Davis with libretto by Richard Wesley, about the Central Park jogger case. The opera won the Pulitzer Prize for Music in May 2020.

== History ==
The company, originally known as Long Beach Grand Opera, was a venture sponsored by the Long Beach Symphony Association to mark the inaugural season of the city’s Terrace Theater. Michael Milenski, formerly of the San Francisco Opera and San Jose Opera, was tapped to mount the first production in March, 1979, Verdi’s La Traviata starring Metropolitan Opera stars Benita Valente and Louis Quilico. The success of that production led to the company’s formal incorporation independent of the Long Beach Symphony with Milenski as its executive director.

Following a period of early growth marked by the presentation of repertory staples, Long Beach Opera took a radical departure from the operatic mainstream. Under Milenski’s guidance, the company developed an alternative vision for opera – to present striking visual drama that would speak directly to contemporary audiences while maintaining the highest musical standard. That new era was launched by two important productions in 1983-84: Britten's Death in Venice and Monteverdi's The Coronation of Poppea starring Catherine Malfitano, a production the Los Angeles Times' chief music and dance critic Martin Bernheimer called LBO's "wild, wonderful Poppea." Both operas were staged by the maverick director Christopher Alden, whose career was given major impetus by his partnership with LBO.

Singers who were engaged by LBO during Milenski's tenure include Jerome Hines, Cesare Siepi, Ruth Ann Swenson, James Morris and Jerry Hadley.

In 2004, Michael Milenski retired after 25 seasons at the helm of LBO and was succeeded by Austrian conductor Andreas Mitisek, who continued LBO’s longstanding artistic philosophy of presenting an expanded vision of opera. His programming emphasized contemporary composers (half a dozen operas by Philip Glass plus operas by John Adams, Ástor Piazzolla, Michael Nyman, Gavin Bryars and Stewart Copeland) and the Restoration-era operas of Henry Purcell. He also established a regular stable of company singers who were cast in successive productions throughout his time as artistic director.

Mitisek left the company in 2020. Yuval Sharon became the company's interim artistic advisor for the 2020-2021 season, which was cut short by the COVID-19 pandemic shutdown. Early in 2021, Los Angeles-based stage and film director James Darrah was named LBO's third artistic director and chief creative officer. His inaugural production later that spring was a mix of LBO tradition (a Philip Glass opera, Les Enfants terribles, staged in a parking garage) and the new (projected video imagery of the staged action as shot in real time, a Darrah signature).

== Productions ==
Important LBO productions of Milenski's tenure included Powder Her Face by Thomas Adès, Richard Strauss’ Elektra (which was televised in Germany), Leoš Janáček's From the House of the Dead, The Beaumarchais Trilogy (The Barber of Seville by Giovanni Paisiello, The Marriage of Figaro by Wolfgang Amadeus Mozart and The Guilty Mother by Mark McGurty) and the complete operas of Claudio Monteverdi. LBO's 1997 world premiere production of Hopper's Wife, an opera by Stewart Wallace and Michael Korie, was praised by the Los Angeles Times for offering "a notion of one possible direction for American opera into the next millennium." Several American premieres were presented on Milenski's watch, including King Roger by Karol Szymanowski, Schoenberg’s Die Jakobsleiter, Bernd Alois Zimmermann's Turning, I Saw Great Injustice and John Cage's Europeras 3&4 (issued in a commercial recording).

Under Mitisek, LBO's significant works included two different productions of Piazzolla's tango opera María de Buenos Aires in 2004 and 2012, daylong performances of Wagner’s Der Ring des Nibelungen in the abridged version by Jonathan Dove, the west coast premiere of Osvaldo Golijov's Ainadamar and the American premiere of Vivaldi's long-lost opera Motezuma. In 2014, it mounted the first local performance of John Adams’ controversial The Death of Klinghoffer, a work that Los Angeles Opera co-commissioned in 1991 but flinched from staging.

As a director, Mitisek was known for bringing creative theatrical concepts to the stage. He conceived the literary/operatic pairing of Goethe's The Sorrows of Young Werther with Schubert's Winterreise. He mounted the world premiere of Fallujah, based on post-traumatic testimonials by Iraq War veterans and a joint project with New York City Opera. Mitisek also conceived the staging of operas in novel sites beginning with Grigory Frid's The Diary of Anne Frank in a parking garage. He literally floated Ricky Ian Gordon's Orpheus and Euridice on the water of Long Beach’s Belmont Plaza Olympic Pool. And he presented Terezín composer Viktor Ullmann's The Emperor of Atlantis inside the hull the retired ocean liner Queen Mary.

Mitisek produced the world premiere of Anthony Davis’ The Central Park Five, an opera that won the Pulitzer Prize for Music in 2020.

During the 2020 COVID-19 pandemic LBO turned to virtual programming, including a series of Community Conversations and a seminar on music history and social justice activism through the arts. In November 2020, LBO held The 2020 Songbook, a virtual fundraiser event that featured 20 world premiere pieces from emerging composers. The pieces were centered thematically around the year 2020 and incorporated a variety of styles.
