= Ronald Naldi =

American opera singer

Ronald Naldi (born 1941 or 1942) is an American lyric tenor who has sung on the stages of the Metropolitan Opera, Lyric Opera of Chicago, Arena di Verona, Salzburger Landestheater, L'Opéra Français, and New Jersey State Opera, under the baton of maestri James Levine, Valery Gergiev, James Conlon, David Robertson, Leonard Slatkin, Joseph Colaneri, Charles Mackerras, Christopher Keene, Alfredo Silipigni, Lukas Foss, Nello Santi, Vincent LaSelva, Thomas Booth, and Eduardo Müller, and alongside singers Plácido Domingo, Luciano Pavarotti, Leo Nucci, James Morris, Samuel Ramey, and Renee Fleming, among many.

His repertory comprises over 100 operatic roles in six languages, as well as an extensive repertory of American, English, French, German, and Italian songs.

Naldi has sung over 300 performances at the Metropolitan Opera since his debut there in 1983, including Ismaele in Nabucco, Tschekalinsky in The Queen of Spades, and Vitek in the Met premiere of Leoš Janáček's The Makropulos Case. In his 15th consecutive season at the Met ('07-'08), he sang in productions of Macbeth, War and Peace, Otello, and The Gambler, as well as a production of Les Troyens with James Levine and the Boston Symphony Orchestra.

Naldi has also appeared with the festivals of Spoleto (Italy), Waterloo, and Caramoor, and toured China, Egypt, the Arab Emirates, Pakistan, and Sri Lanka with the Ambassadors of Opera. He has performed with over 25 symphony orchestras and has an extensive repertory of more than 30 oratorios. With St. Luke's Chamber Ensemble, he has sung over 200 performances of the chamber operas of Haydn, Mozart, Rossini, Offenbach, Rieti, and Fioravanti.

Born in Bound Brook, New Jersey, Naldi graduated in 1960 from Bound Brook High School.

He is a member of the Italian-American Hall of Fame, and has been tenor soloist and artist-in-residence in Ocean Grove, New Jersey, for 41 summer seasons.

== Education ==
Naldi earned bachelor's and master's degrees in music in five years at Indiana University School of Music in Bloomington and subsequently received a Fulbright scholarship to study in Rome. He has studied voice with Charles Kullman, Margaret Harshaw, Luigi Ricci, Luciano Francardi, Carol Bayard, and William Riley.

From 1966 to 1973, he was a professor of voice at Memphis State University (currently the University of Memphis).

== Discography ==
Most recent recordings are entitled O Sole Mio (2003) and Torna a Surriento (2004), the latter winning a critics' choice award from "Gramophone" magazine. Each features Neapolitan and Italian songs with orchestrations by John Colaiacovo.
