= Frederick Douglass (Ulysses Kay opera) =

Opera by Ulysses Kay

- Opera by Ulysses Kay
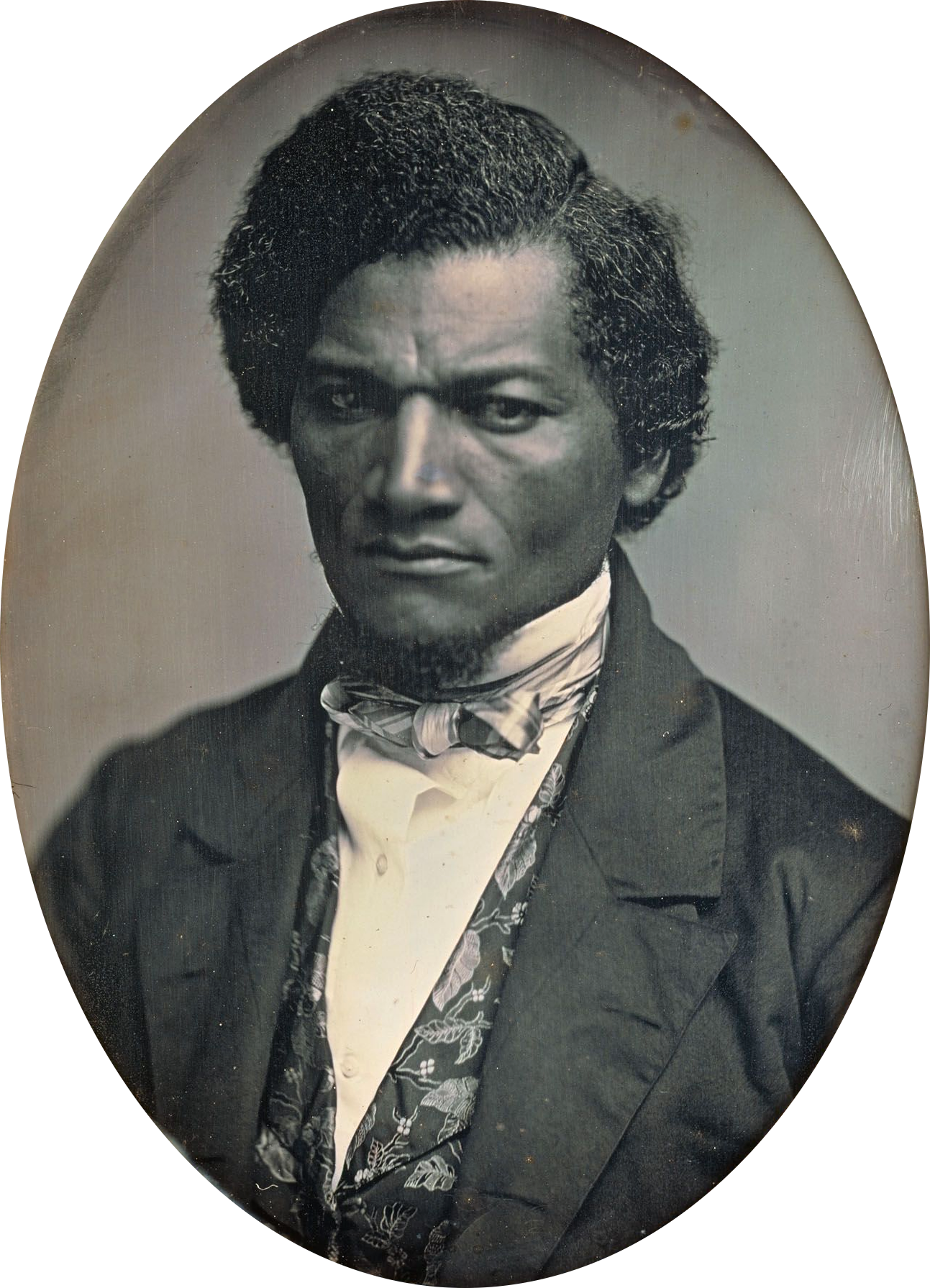
- Frederick Douglass, the opera's protagonist
- Librettist: Donald Dorr
- Premiere: 12 April 1991; Newark, New Jersey

Frederick Douglass is an opera in three acts composed by Ulysses Kay to a libretto by Donald Dorr. Its story is a semi-fictionalized account of the final years in the life of Frederick Douglass after his marriage to his second wife, Helen Pitts Douglass. The opera premiered on April 12, 1991, at Newark Symphony Hall performed by the New Jersey State Opera in a production conducted by Alfredo Silipigni, directed by Louis Johnson and designed by Salvatore Tagliarino.

== Background ==
In 1978 it was announced that both Kay and Dorr received grants from the National Endowment for the Arts to work on the opera. Dorr and Kay worked on the opera beginning in 1979 and completed it in 1985.

== Roles ==
| Role | Voice type | Premiere cast April 12, 1991 (Cond. Alfredo Silipigni) |
|---|---|---|
| Frederick Douglass | bass | Kevin Maynor |
| Helen, (Helen Pitts Douglass), his wife | soprano | Klara Barlow |
| Howard, Douglass's son | tenor | Gregory Rahming |
| Aubrey, a young officer | tenor | Ronald Naldi |
| Senator Norton | baritone | Mark Delavan |
| Busby, a merchant | tenor | Mark Nicolson |
| Demler, a newsman | tenor | Kirk Redmann |
| Secretary Welles | bass-baritone | Kenneth Church |
| Major Domo | bass-baritone | Richard McKee |
| Mrs. Sly, a guest | | Jennifer Gucci |
| Mrs. Pry, a guest | soprano | Tracy Magliaro |
| Agnes, a servant | soprano | Christine D'Amico |
| Timothy, her lover | tenor | Tony Buonauro |

== Sources ==
- Abdul, Raoul (April 27, 1991). "Ulysses Kay's opera, Frederick Douglass, Makes Makes Impact: Reading the Score". New York Amsterdam News. New York.
- Anon. (July 15, 1978). "Dorr Gets Grant". New Pittsburgh Courier. Pittsburgh. p. 19.
- Anon. (April 12, 1991). "Frederick Douglass (program for the world premiere)". Newark, New Jersey.
- Hobson, Constance Tibbs; Richardson, Deborra A. (1994). Ulysses Kay: A Bio-Bibliography. Bio-Bibliographies in Music. Vol. 53. Westport, Connecticut: Greenwood Press. ISBN 0313255466. OCLC 55741536.
