= List of shipwrecks in 1885 =

The list of shipwrecks in 1885 includes ships sunk, foundered, grounded, or otherwise lost during 1885.

table of contents
1885
Jan	Feb	Mar	Apr
May	Jun	Jul	Aug
Sep	Oct	Nov	Dec
Unknown date

== Unknown date ==
List of shipwrecks: Unknown date 1885
Ship	State	Description
Aggie	United States	The steamboat sank in the Missouri River at Kansas City, Kansas.
Alaska	United States	The schooner was lost in the Bering Sea.
Gale	United States	The whaler, a barque, was lost in the Bering Sea at Saint Lawrence Island.
Labrador	United Kingdom	The barque sailed from Quebec for Newcastle-on-Tyne on 20 August 1885 with wood products and was last seen two days later off "Pic" (Pointe-au-Pic, Quebec?). In December she was presumed foundered with the loss of all twenty crew.
Peacedale	Flag unknown	The schooner was lost at Ocean Grove, New Jersey.
Proven	Flag unknown	The ship was lost in the Arctic Sea. Her crew were rescued.
Rainier	United States	The barque was lost in the Arctic Sea.
Rose of Sharon	United Kingdom	The ship was destroyed by fire in the Atlantic Ocean after 17 August. Her crew were rescued. She was on a voyage from Montreal, Quebec, Canada to Buenos Aires, Argentina.
Swallow	United Kingdom	The clipper was abandoned off Liverpool, Lancashire. Her crew were rescued. She was on a voyage from Liverpool to Sydney, New South Wales.
