= The Juggler =

The Juggler or The Jugglers may refer to:

- Juggling
- The Juggler, a book by Michael Blankfort
  - The Juggler (film), a 1953 film based on the book
- "The Juggler" (1977), a song by Weather Report from the album Heavy Weather
- The Juggler (demo) (1986), an early Amiga computer demo
- Adam Powers, The Juggler, a 1981 computer animation

== See also ==
- The Juggler of Notre Dame (disambiguation), the English translation of the title of several works
