= Judith Dvorkin =

American composer and librettist

Judith Dvorkin (22 April 1928 – 24 July 1995) was an American composer and librettist. She also used the pseudonym Judy Spencer.

Dvorkin was born in New York. She received a bachelor's degree in music at Barnard College, where her teachers included Otto Luening. She received a master's degree from Columbia University, where her teachers included Luening, Douglas Moore, and Elliott Carter. She continued her studies in seminars with Roger Sessions at the University of California at Berkeley, and with jazz pianist Teddy Wilson.

She wrote lyrics for 23 songs for the Captain Kangaroo television program, which Earl Rose set to music. Other collaborators included Norris Turney, Jimmy Rowles, Paul Rosner, and Dick Chodosh. Most of her manuscripts and papers are archived at the New York Public Library's American Music Center.

== Works ==
Dvorkin is known for chamber opera and theater works, but also composed vocal and instrumental works. Selected works include:

- Humpty Dumpty, 1988, opera based on Alice's Adventures in Wonderland by Lewis Carroll
- Blue Star, 1983, opera
- The Capitoline Venus, 1969, opera in one act after an episode in the writings of Mark Twain, libretto by Judith Dvorkin (music by Ulysses Kay). Premiered in March 1971 in Champaign-Urbana, IL by Richard Aslanian and the University of Illinois Opera Group.
- Marpessa: A Myth, for soprano, clarinet and piano
- Cyrano, based on the play by Edmond Rostand, as translated by E.W. Dvorkin ca. 1964
- Maurice
- Perspectives for flute
- Song Cycle for choir
- Four Women for voice. Premiered April 1981 in New Canaan, CT, a song cycle written for Jacqueline Sharpe based on texts by Emily Dickinson, Eleanor Roosevelt, Sarah Bernhardt, and Zhuo Wenjun.
- The Children for bass, flute, oboe and violin
- Rumpelstiltskin, a musical
- The Emperor's New Clothes, one-act opera, composer

Her work has been recorded and issued on CD, including:

- Maurice, New World Records
