= The Bear (play) =

Play by Anton Chekhov

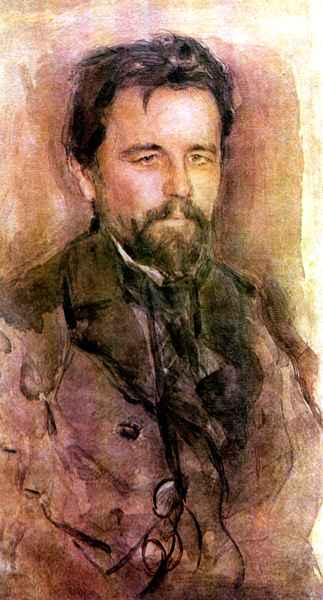
- Painting of Chekhov by Valentin Serov
- Original language: Russian
- Written by: Anton Chekhov
- Genre: vaudeville/farce comedy

Premiere
- Date: October 28, 1888
- Place: Moscow

The Bear: A Joke in One Act, or The Boor (Russian: Медведь: Шутка в одном действии, romanized: Medved': Shutka v odnom deystvii, 1888), is a one-act comedic play written by Russian author Anton Chekhov. The play was originally dedicated to Nikolai Nikolaevich Solovtsov, Chekhov's boyhood friend and director/actor who first played the character Smirnov.

== Characters ==
- Elena Ivanovna Popova, a little landowning widow with dimples on her cheeks
- Grigory Stepanovitch Smirnov, a middle-aged landowner
- Luka, Popova's aged footman caring, loyal, obedient and not so intelligent

== Plot ==
The play takes place in the drawing room of Elena Ivanovna Popova's estate exactly seven months after her husband's death. Since her husband died, Popova has locked herself in the house in mourning. Her footman, Luka, begins the play by begging Popova to stop mourning and step outside the estate. She ignores him, saying that she made a promise to her husband to remain forever faithful to his memory. Their conversation is interrupted when Grigory Stepanovitch Smirnov arrives and wishes to see Elena Ivanovna Popova.

Although Luka tells Grigory Smirnov to leave, he ignores Luka's requests and enters the dining room. Popova agrees to meet him and Smirnov explains to her that her late husband owes him a sum of 1,200 roubles as a debt. Because he is a landowner, Smirnov explains that he needs the sum paid to him on that same day to pay for the mortgage of a house due the next day. Popova explains that she has no money with her and that she will settle her husband's debts when her steward arrives the day after tomorrow. Smirnov gets angered by her refusal to pay him back and mocks the supposed 'mourning' of her husband, saying:

Well, there! "A state of mind."... "Husband died seven months ago!" Must I pay the interest, or mustn't I? I ask you: Must I pay, or must I not? Suppose your husband is dead, and you've got a state of mind, and nonsense of that sort.... And your steward's gone away somewhere, devil take him, what do you want me to do? Do you think I can fly away from my creditors in a balloon, or what? Or do you expect me to go and run my head into a brick wall?

Smirnov decides that he will not leave the estate until his debts are paid off, even if that means waiting until the day after tomorrow. He and Popova get into another argument when he starts yelling at the footman to bring him kvass or any alcoholic beverage. The argument turns into a debate about true love according to the different genders. Smirnov argues that women are incapable of loving "anybody except a lapdog", to which Popova argues that she wholeheartedly loved her husband although he cheated on her and disrespected her. The argument deteriorates into another shouting match about paying back the debt. During this argument Popova insults Smirnov by calling him a bear, amongst other names, saying, "You're a boor! A coarse bear! A Bourbon! A monster!"

Smirnov, insulted, calls for a duel, not caring that Popova is a woman. Popova, in turn, enthusiastically agrees and goes off to get a pair of guns her husband owned. Luka overhears their conversation, gets frightened for his mistress, and goes off to find someone to help put an end to their feud before anyone gets hurt. Meanwhile, Smirnov says to himself how impressed he is by Popova's audacity and slowly realizes that he has actually fallen in love with her and her dimpled cheeks. When Popova returns with the pistols, Smirnov makes his love confession. Popova oscillates between refusing him and ordering him to leave and telling him to stay. Eventually, the two get close and kiss each other just as Luka returns with the gardener and coachman.

== History ==
The Bear is one of many of Chekhov's "farce-vaudevilles", which also includes The Proposal, A Tragedian in Spite of Himself, and the unfinished Night before the Trial. In a letter to Yakov Polonsky on February 22, 1888, Chekhov wrote:

Just to while away the time, I wrote a trivial little vaudeville [vodevilchik] in the French manner, called The Bear . . . Alas! when they out on Novoye Vremya find out that I write vaudevilles they will excommunicate me. What am I to do? I plan something worthwhile—and—it is all tra-la-la! In spite of all my attempts at being serious the result is nothing; with me the serious alternates with the trivial!

Chekhov used the French play Les Jurons de Cadillac by Pierre Berton as inspiration for The Bear. The main similarity between the two involves the idea of the male being a 'bear' tamed by a woman. Les Jurons de Cadillac was originally performed by the actor Nikolai Solovstov, whom Chekhov dedicates The Bear to and ultimately plays the role of Smirnov.

It had its English language premiere in London in 1911. The United States premiere was in New York in 1915.

In 1935, Russian theatre producer and director Vsevolod Meyerhold produced 33 Swoons (also translated as 33 Fainting Fits), which was a production that combined Chekhov's The Anniversary, The Bear, and The Proposal. Meyerhold counted 33 cases of swooning and combined these three plays with swooning as the key comedic gag.

== Reception ==
The play had its premiere in Korsh Theatre in Moscow on October 28, 1888. The Bear was a success from the start. In Chekhov's lifetime it brought in regular royalties, and it has constantly been revived on both professional and amateur stages worldwide since. Chekhov, who often referred to his own writing in self-deprecating ways, remarked on his success: "I've managed to write a stupid vaudeville which, owing to the fact that it is stupid, is enjoying surprising success."

== Adaptations ==
The play is the basis for operas by Dominick Argento (The Boor, 1957), William Walton (The Bear, 1967) and Ulysses Kay (The Boor, 1968). It was also the inspiration for the second act of the 1979 musical A Day in Hollywood/A Night in the Ukraine, which transformed the story into a Marx Brothers comedy.

On October 12, 1950, The Nash Airflyte Theater presented The Boor, starring Fredric March, on CBS-TV. It was adapted for an episode of the radio show On Stage in 1953. Walter Brown Newman wrote the script as a western, and Cathy Lewis, Elliott Lewis, Byron Kane, and Horace Murphy starred. In 2000 it was made into a short film, Speed for Thespians, in which a group of actors put on The Bear on a New York City bus.
