= Klara Barlow =

American opera singer

- Born: Alma Claire Williams; 28 July 1928; New York City, New York
- Died: 20 January 2008 (aged 79); New York City, New York
- Occupations: opera singer dramatic soprano
- Years active: 1954 - 1991
- Height: 5 ft 11 in (180 cm)

Klara Barlow (July 28, 1928 in New York City, New York – January 20, 2008 in New York City, New York) was an American opera singer who had an active international career from the mid-1960s to the 1990s. A dramatic soprano, Barlow particularly excelled in portraying Strauss and Wagnerian heroines. The 5-foot-11-inch-tall "platinum-blonde beauty" was ideal for playing the "Wagnerian blondes": roles like Elsa, Eva, Sieglinde, and Elisabeth. Although she worked most often in the German repertoire, Barlow also sang roles from the Italian, French, and Czech repertories. While her performance credits included leading roles at most of the world's major opera houses, she never achieved a high level of international fame. She did not participate in any commercial audio recordings, although her voice is preserved on a few television and radio broadcasts made in Germany, Canada, and the United States.

== Early life and career ==
Born Alma Claire Williams, Barlow worked as a secretary, salesperson, receptionist and model before pursuing an opera career. She took the stage name "Klara Barlow" from a suggestion by a numerologist who told her that it would suit her better professionally. She studied voice under Cecile Jacobson in New York City and made her professional recital debut as a coloratura soprano at Carnegie Hall in 1954. Although critics were enthusiastic, she was unable to attract the interest of major opera companies in the United States. She did however, sing with Giuseppina La Puma's highly respected amateur company, The Mascagni Opera.

By 1961, twice divorced and with a nine-year-old daughter to support, she decided to try her luck in Europe. She moved to Switzerland to pursue further studies in opera and it was there that she was directed into the dramatic repertory. She finally made her professional opera debut as Venus in Richard Wagner' Tannhäuser at the Stadttheater Bern in 1962. She joined the roster of principal sopranos at the Stadttheater Oberhausen in 1963 where she sang for two seasons. In 1965 she joined the Kiel Opera House where she sang regularly for one year.

== First major successes ==
Barlow's first major success came in 1966 when she made her debut at the Komische Oper Berlin as Donna Anna in Wolfgang Amadeus Mozart's Don Giovanni. The production was directed by Walter Felsenstein and was broadcast live on German television. That performance was recently released on DVD in January 2009 in a boxed collection with several other operas directed by Felsenstein at the Komische Oper between 1956 and 1976. She sang several more leading roles with the company during the 1966–1967 season to great success. Barlow next worked as a principal soprano at the Hessisches Staatstheater Wiesbaden from 1967 to 1969 and then at the Opernhaus Zürich from 1969 to 1970. Her major successes at these houses were portraying heroines from operas by Richard Wagner, Richard Strauss, and Giuseppe Verdi. She made her first opera appearances in the United States in 1969 as the title role in Verdi's Aida with the Portland Opera and at the San Diego Opera as Elizabeth in Tannhäuser.

In 1967 Barlow sang her first Isolde in Wagner's Tristan und Isolde in Kiel, a performance which didn't put her on the map but it did lead to an engagement to sing the part at the 1968 Festival dei Due Mondi in Spoleto, Italy opposite Claude Heater as Tristan. The Spoletto production was directed and conducted by composer Gian Carlo Menotti and was highly received. After this point Isolde became one of Barlow's signature parts and she repeated the role in over thirty European performances over the next six years. Barlow's first major success at the Metropolitan Opera was as Isolde to Jon Vickers' Tristan in 1974; a performance broadcast live on the radio. The New York Times wrote a feature article on her performance, proclaiming it "the performance of her life". Time stated that, "To New York audiences who have seen almost nothing for 15 years except Birgit Nilsson's cool, ruminative portrayal, Barlow's sexy Isolde came as a pleasant shock." She had made her Met debut three years earlier as Leonore in Beethoven's Fidelio on February 3, 1971, with Robert Nagy as Florestan and William Dooley as Don Pizarro, later followed by performances of Donna Anna that year. Barlow returned to the Met several more times during the 1970s, singing Marina in Boris Godunov (1975), Amelia in Un Ballo in Maschera (1975-1976), and the title role in Elektra (1975). She last sang with the Met as one of the denizens in the company's first-season run of Kurt Weill's Rise and Fall of the City of Mahagonny in 1979.

== Later life and career ==
During the 1970s and 1980s Barlow maintained an active career working as a freelance artist with companies throughout the world. She sang Freia in Das Rheingold and Sieglinde in Die Walküre for Seattle Opera's productions of Wagner's Ring Cycle from 1970 to 1972. She returned to Seattle in 1976 to portray Brünnhilde in Götterdämmerung, a role she also sang with the Dallas Opera in 1981. In 1972 she sang the role of Mathilde in the Opera Orchestra of New York's concert performance of Gioachino Rossini's William Tell with Louis Quilico in the title role. That same year she sang Donna Anna to Jerome Hines's Don Giovanni for her debut with the Philadelphia Lyric Opera Company. In 1973 she made an unexpected debut at the Bavarian State Opera as Elektra, getting a call to fill in for a sick artist just 17 hours before the curtain went up. In 1974 she made her debut at La Scala as Fata Morgana in Sergei Prokofiev's The Love for Three Oranges, also singing Leonore in Fidelio with the company that year.

In 1975 Barlow gave a lauded recital at New York City's Town Hall, performing a difficult program which included "O Hoffnung! O komm" from Beethoven's Leonore (what would later become "Komm, Hoffnung" from the revised Fidelio), the final scene from Anna Bolena, and a fully staged interpretation of the opening monologue from Elektra. Andrew Porter of The New Yorker wrote that Barlow "has a secure, powerful, and well-schooled soprano. She is the kind of honest, solidly reliable singer, definite in intention and definite about the actual notes, that is becoming increasingly rare." After comparing her versatility to that of soprano Florence Easton, Porter noted that "there is not much sensuous allure in Barlow's firm, strong tone, and no trace of dainty charm in her heroic manner. Yet I feel that I could go to hear her even in so apparently inappropriate a role as Verdi's Violetta or Puccini's Mimi with the assurance that nothing would be fudged or shirked. She drew long, clear lines. She plainly knew the meaning of everything she sang, and how to express it."

Barlow also portrayed leading roles at the Deutsche Oper Berlin (1970), the Opéra national du Rhin (1970), the Houston Grand Opera (1970), the Vienna State Opera (1972 and 1974), the Scottish Opera (1973), the Teatro Comunale di Bologna (1973), the Teatro Carlo Felice (1973), the Teatro Lirico Giuseppe Verdi (1974), the Lyric Opera of Chicago (1976-1977), the Cincinnati Opera (1978), and the Opera Company of Philadelphia (1981). Other companies on Barlow's résumé included the Hungarian State Opera, Théâtre du Capitole, Det Kongelige Teater, the Canadian Opera Company, Opera Memphis, the Palacio de Bellas Artes, the Hamburg State Opera, the Semperoper, and the Staatstheater Stuttgart. Some of her other opera roles included Abigaille in Nabucco, Agathe in Der Freischütz, Elisabetta in Don Carlos, Elsa in Lohengrin, Giulietta in The Tales of Hoffmann, Minnie Falconer in La fanciulla del West, Senta in The Flying Dutchman, and the title roles in Arabella, Ariadne auf Naxos, Jenůfa, Norma, Salome, Tosca, and Turandot. She also recorded the role of Salome for CBC Television.

Barlow's last opera season as a full-time performer was the 1985–1986 season where she sang Elektra and Leonore at the Bremen Theater and The Dyer's Wife in Die Frau ohne Schatten at Theater Bielefeld. In 1987 she took a job as a member of the voice faculty at Indiana University in Bloomington, where she taught through 2002. Although her performance career slowed down when she began teaching, Barlow continued to appear in operas into the mid-1990s. She notably portrayed Helen Pitts Douglass, the wife of Frederick Douglass, in the world premiere of Ulysses Kay and Donald Dorr's Frederick Douglass at the New Jersey State Opera in April 1991.
