= Gordon Turk =

American organist

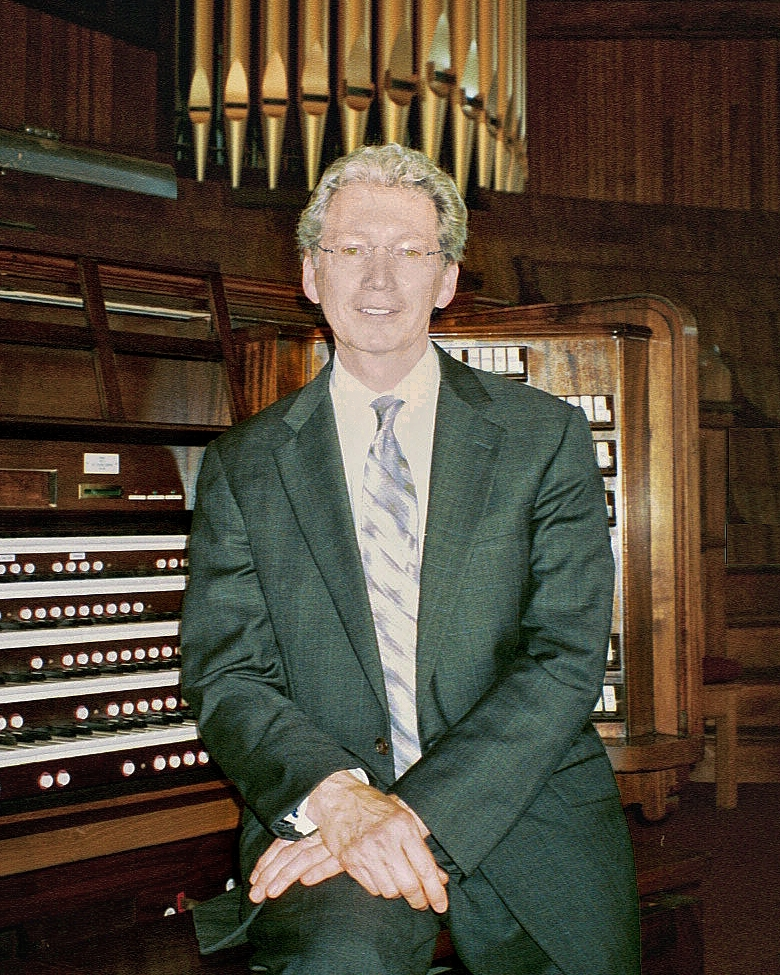
- Gordon Turk at the Ocean Grove (NJ) Auditorium organ
- Born: 1949 (age 75–76); New Jersey, U.S.
- Occupation(s): organist, composer

Gordon Turk (born 1949) is an American concert organist. He has played throughout the United States, made two concert tours in Japan, and performed frequently in Europe, including Ukraine and Russia, both as solo organist and with orchestra.

== Early years and education ==
The son of a Methodist minister in New Jersey, Turk began piano studies at age five and then organ when he was ten years old. He graduated from the Curtis Institute of Music, where he studied piano and organ. He also studied with New York composer and organist McNeil Robinson at the Manhattan School of Music in New York City, earning the master's degree and the Doctor of Musical Arts, both with honors. He is a former Professor of Organ at West Chester University (1992–1999) and in 2013 became professor of organ instruction at Rowan University.

== Professional career ==
Turk is particularly well known as resident organist of the Great Auditorium in Ocean Grove, New Jersey. Since he took this post in 1974, the famed Robert Hope-Jones organ has been enriched with a remarkably diverse tonal palette and expanded to its current size of 207 ranks and 12,200 total pipes, played from a five-manual console.

Besides playing for weekly Sunday services, Turk offers solo recitals (along with guest concert organists) in the Auditorium on most Wednesdays and Saturdays in July and August. Turk has described the Auditorium organ as unique, saying "I know it when I hear it, even a recording on the radio."

He also serves as artistic director of the acclaimed "Summer Stars Classical Series" held there on Thursday evenings. On July 3, 2008, Turk presented the Organ Centennial Concert as part of the Summer Stars Classical Series to celebrate the 100th anniversary of the organ's dedicatory recital on July 3, 1908. In May 2006, he was one of the first organists to perform on the newly installed Fred J. Cooper Memorial Organ in Philadelphia's Kimmel Center for the Performing Arts. The previous year, he gave a recital on the Wanamaker Organ in Philadelphia, the largest functioning musical instrument in the world.

He has also appeared in concert as a harpsichordist, pianist, and conductor (choral and orchestral). As a composer, he has written compositions for string orchestra, woodwinds, organ, piano, voice and chorus. In January 2000, his composition Elegy for string orchestra and oboe was performed live on television in Japan.

Turk is also organist and choirmaster of St. Mary's Episcopal Church in Wayne, Pennsylvania.

== Awards and honors ==
Turk has received the John Cerevalo Prize for "Excellence in the Performance of the Music of Johann Sebastian Bach". He also has been a prize-winner in the national improvisation competition of the American Guild of Organists.

== Recordings ==
In addition to being featured on such radio programs as Pipedreams and Sacred Classics, as well as Philadelphia-area broadcasts, Turk has released multiple recordings, including:

- Ocean Grove – French Spectaculars on the Great Ocean Grove Auditorium Organ
- Organ Echoes – Sacred Classics
- Organ in the Grand Tradition
- The Great Auditorium Organ
