= Deborra Richardson =

American curator

Deborra Richardson is a past Curator Emerita at the Archives of the Smithsonian National Museum of American History (NMAH). Her research specialties were African American Music Collections and Archival Administration. She grew up in Long Island, New York, and currently lives in Brentwood, Maryland.

== Education ==
Richardson has a Bachelor's Degree in Music from Howard University and a Master's in Library Science from University of Maryland, College Park.

== Career ==
As a lover of books, some of Richardson's first jobs were in libraries, cataloguing music collections. In an interview with Angel Diaz, Richardson claimed that she learned most of what she knows on archival and manuscript description on the job.

While she attended Howard University, she began her career with the Moorland–Spingarn Research Center "which sparked her passion to provide archival community service to individuals and organizations."

In 1980, Richardson began working for the Smithsonian National Museum of American History. She has served as head of reference, assistant chair, and chair of the Archives Center as well as Archives Specialist for the Duke Ellington Collection. In her service with the NMAH, Richardson worked to educate and involve students and young adults in the archival process. She utilized hands-on experience in her teachings, as well as archival theory.

In the past, she has been a part of other notable archive projects involving African American Museum concepts and Fine Arts as a revitalization tool, such as Ellington's female vocalists and Ulysses Kay. She was also a contributor to the New York metropolitan area hip hop symposium "Documenting History in Your Own Backyard" at the Schomburg Center for Research in Black Culture. Richardson and her colleagues brought forward issues of documentation and preservation, educating attendees on the history of hip hop culture.

She has published two books, including Treasures at the Museum which is aimed at elementary students K-4th and encourages inter-generational communication and interaction with archives and museums.

Richardson is a long-time advocate for diversity in the archival profession. When she was recommended as an SAA Fellow in 2013, one colleague mentioned that she is "a fine exemplar of the importance of diversity in the field of archives and a strong advocate for a more participatory and outreach-oriented profession."

=== Affiliations ===
She has served as a representative and chair of the American Library Association and the Association of American Museums Joint Committee on Archives, Libraries and Museums from 2004-2008.

Richardson was a member of the Black Caucus of the American Library Association as well as the Society of American Archivists. She served on the SAA Council from 2009-2012 and in 2013, Richardson was named a Fellow of the SAA.

She has also been a member and leader of the Archivists and Archives of Color Roundtable in the SAA. When asked why she took on leadership roles in the SAA, she answered:

Mostly, I saw work that needed to be done, and stepped in when no one else seemed to be willing. In other words, I did not consciously choose to take on leadership roles, I saw opportunities to get things done that felt important to me and I decided to take advantage of those opportunities.

As a professional archivist, she attended the Archives Leadership Institute and the Institute for Cultural Entrepreneurship.

== Publications ==
- Treasures at the Museum, 2011
- Ulysses Kay: A Bio-Bibliography (Bio-Bibliographies in Music), 1994
