= The Juggler of Notre Dame =

The Juggler of Notre Dame or The Juggler of Our Lady may refer to

- Our Lady's Tumbler, a medieval poem on which the later stories are based
- "Le Jongleur de Notre Dame" (short story), a story by French writer Anatole France; published in 1892
- Le jongleur de Notre-Dame (opera), an opera by French composer Jules Massenet; first performed in 1902
- The Juggler of Our Lady (opera), an opera by Ulysses Kay and Alexander King
