= The Boor =

Opera by Ulysses Kay

The Boor is an opera in one act composed by Ulysses Kay to a libretto based on Anton Chekhov's comic play, The Bear (also known as The Boor). Kay wrote the libretto himself basing it on an English translation of the play by the composer Vladimir Ussachevsky. The opera was commissioned by the Koussevitsky Foundation of the Library of Congress and is dedicated to the memory of Natalie and Serge Koussevitzky. It premiered on 2 April 1968 in concert version at the University of Kentucky in Lexington, Kentucky.

== Roles ==
- Elena Ivanovna Popova, a landowning young widow (soprano)
- Grigory Stepanovitch Smirnov, a middle-aged landowner (baritone)
- Luka, Elena's elderly footman (tenor)
