= The Capitoline Venus (opera) =

Opera by Ulysses Kay

The Capitoline Venus is a chamber opera in one act composed by Ulysses Kay to a libretto by Judith Dvorkin based on Mark Twain's 1869 satirical short story "The Legend of the Capitoline Venus". It premiered on 12 March 1971 at the Krannert Center for the Performing Arts in Urbana, Illinois performed by the University of Illinois Opera Group.
