= Jason Tramm =

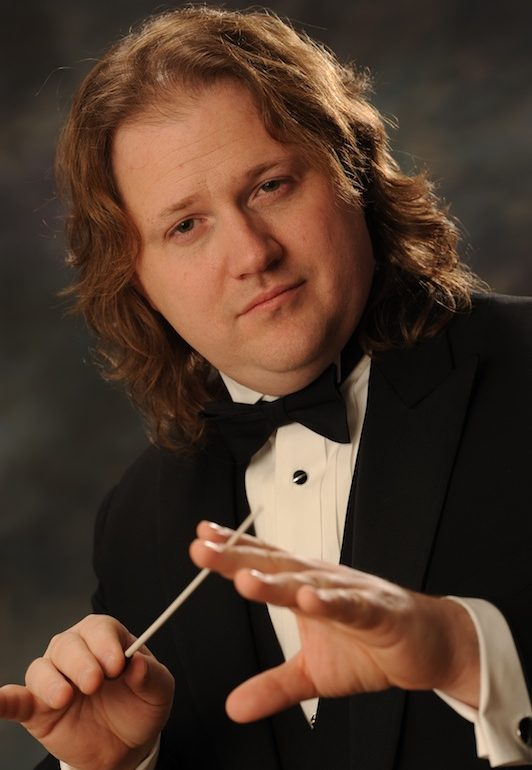

Background information
- Born: Jason Chris Tramm; December 29, 1974 (age 51); Nanuet, New York, U.S.
- Genres: Chamber Music; Classical; Opera
- Occupations: Musician; Conductor; Professor
- Years active: 2003–present
- Website: www.jasontramm.net

Jason Chris Tramm (born December 29, 1974) is an American music conductor and Director of Choral Activities at Seton Hall University.

He currently holds the position of artistic director and Principal Conductor at MidAtlantic Opera, where he debuted at Carnegie Hall's Stern Auditorium in 2015, with a program titled A Prayer for Peace.

He currently resides as the executive director of the Light Opera of New Jersey, the music director of the Putnam Chorale, and music director of the Taghkanic Chorale

His performance repertoire, Included compositions by Bernstein, Vaughan Williams, and Saygun. Following the performance, additional appearances at Carnegie Hall were planned.

Previously, he served as the artistic director of the New Jersey State Opera from 2008 to 2012, where he collaborated with performers including Samuel Ramey, Vladimir Galouzine, and Angela Brown.

His work with the opera was recognized for the regional Emmy Award for the 2009 HDTV broadcast of "Verdi Requiem: Live from Ocean Grove" which aired on PBS affiliate NJN.

== Early life and music education ==
Tramm was born on December 29, 1974, to Joan Anne Tramm (née Weininger) and John Carl Tramm in Nanuet, New York. As a child, he sang as a soprano soloist at Saint Thomas Church in West Nyack, NY. He studied voice, piano, and viola.

He attended the Crane School and the Hartt School, where he earned degrees in music. He later earned a doctoral degree in conducting from Rutgers University, and received the Presidential Fellowship.

== Music career ==
Tramm has conducted opera, symphonies, and choral performances in Albania, Italy, Romania, Hungary and across the United States.

Since 2008, during the summer season, Tramm has served Director of Music in Residence at the Ocean Grove Camp Meeting Association, in Ocean Grove, NJ.In that role, he directs choral, orchestral, and oratorio performances at the Great Auditorium, including the Ocean Grove Choir Festival. He has conducted performances as part of Summer Stars Classical Music Series alongside against organist Gordon Turk. Tramm and Turk also appeared together on two National Public Radio broadcasts featuring orchestra performances.

Tramm served as director of Coro Lirico, an amateur chorus based in Morris County, for four years.

At Seton Hall University, Tramm organized a program honoring conductor Alfredo Silipigni. The event included the Grand Finals Concert of the Alfredo Silipigni International Vocal Competition at Jubliee Auditorium

Tramm also conducted the University Chamber Choir at the annual Evening of Roses fundraiser for the Rose Thering Fund for Education in Jewish-Christian Studies.

In 2020, Tramm and his con, Quinton Tramm, launched the Youtube podcast Music Matters with Jason Tramm during the COVID-19 pandemic.

In September2023, Tramm and pianist Kariné Poghosyan performed with the MidAtlantic Philharmonic Orchestra at St. Vartan Armenian Cathedral. The program included Sergei Rachmanioff's Piano Concerto No. 2 and Aram Khachaturian's Piano Concerto in D-flat Major.

Tramm joined the New Jersey State Opera, in 2006, under the mentorship of Alfredo Silipigni and became the company's leader in 2008 .

During his tenure, Tramm oversaw a production of Porgy and Bess at Newark Symphony Hall. Accordin to interviews at the time, he selected the work in an effort to attract broader audiences to the opera.

=== Pedagogy ===
In addition to his conducting roles, Tramm has served as Director of Choral and Orchestral Activities at Seton Hall University since 2011. He was named the university's Faculty Teacher of the Year

In 2003, he received the Rising Star Award from the SUNY Potsdam Alumni Association, an award previously given to performers including Renee Fleming and Stephanie Blythe. He has also conducted operatic and symphonic performances in Italy, Romania, Albania, and Hungary, where he recorded an album of French operatic arias with the Szeged Symphony.

Tramm's performances have been reviewed in Symphony Magazine and the Huffington Post.
