= The Juggler of Our Lady (opera) =

Opera by Ulysses Kay

The Juggler of Our Lady is an opera in one act composed by Ulysses Kay to a libretto by Alexander King. The libretto is based on R. O. Blechman's 1953 book The Juggler of Our Lady. A Medieval Legend. Composed in 1956, the opera premiered on 23 February 1962 in New Orleans, Louisiana performed by the Xavier University Opera Workshop. It was performed again in 1972 by Opera/South in Jackson Mississippi in a double bill with William Grant Still's opera Highway 1, U.S.A.. The 1972 performance of both operas was also broadcast on Voice of America.
