= Alfredo Silipigni =

American conductor

Alfredo Silipigni (April 9, 1931 – March 25, 2006) was the creator of the New Jersey State Opera in the 1970s and remained there until his death in 2006. While with the opera company, Silipigni led opera productions throughout North America as lead conductor including Turandot and Caterina Cornaro.

== Early life ==
Silipigni was born in Atlantic City and educated at the Juilliard School and Westminster Choir College of Rider University.

== Career ==
For his opera career, Silipigni was part of the NBC Symphony Orchestra in the mid 1950s and played at Carnegie Hall. Silipigni started worked with the New Jersey State Opera when they opened in the 1960s. While with the opera company, Silipigni was a director and lead conductor. Silipigni was known for his talent conducting verismo opera. In 1973 he took the New Jersey State Opera to New York's Carnegie Hall where he conducted the United States' premiere of a long forgotten Donizetti opera, Catarina Cornaro. Silipigni conducted Puccini's Turandot for the NJSOpera's house debut at the New Jersey Performing Arts Center (Newark) in February and March 1998.

For the 1999 production of Giordano's Fedora in Mexico City, Silipigni worked with Placido Domingo. Other stars, including Metropolitan Opera singers Licia Albanese and Jerome Hines, often sang in his productions. In October 2002, Silipigni conducted two performances of Verdi's Aida in Shanghai with a cast of 1,500 and audiences of more than 50,000, according to the NJSOpera web site. He also brought in singers based in other parts of the world for rare American appearances. These included Turkish soprano Leyla Gencer, verismo Magda Olivero, and dramatic tenor Nicola Martinucci.

== Death ==
Silipigni died on March 25 at the age of 74 in Livingston, New Jersey. His death was caused by complications of pneumonia.
