= Ocean Grove, New Jersey =

Place in Monmouth County, New Jersey, United States

- Census-designated place
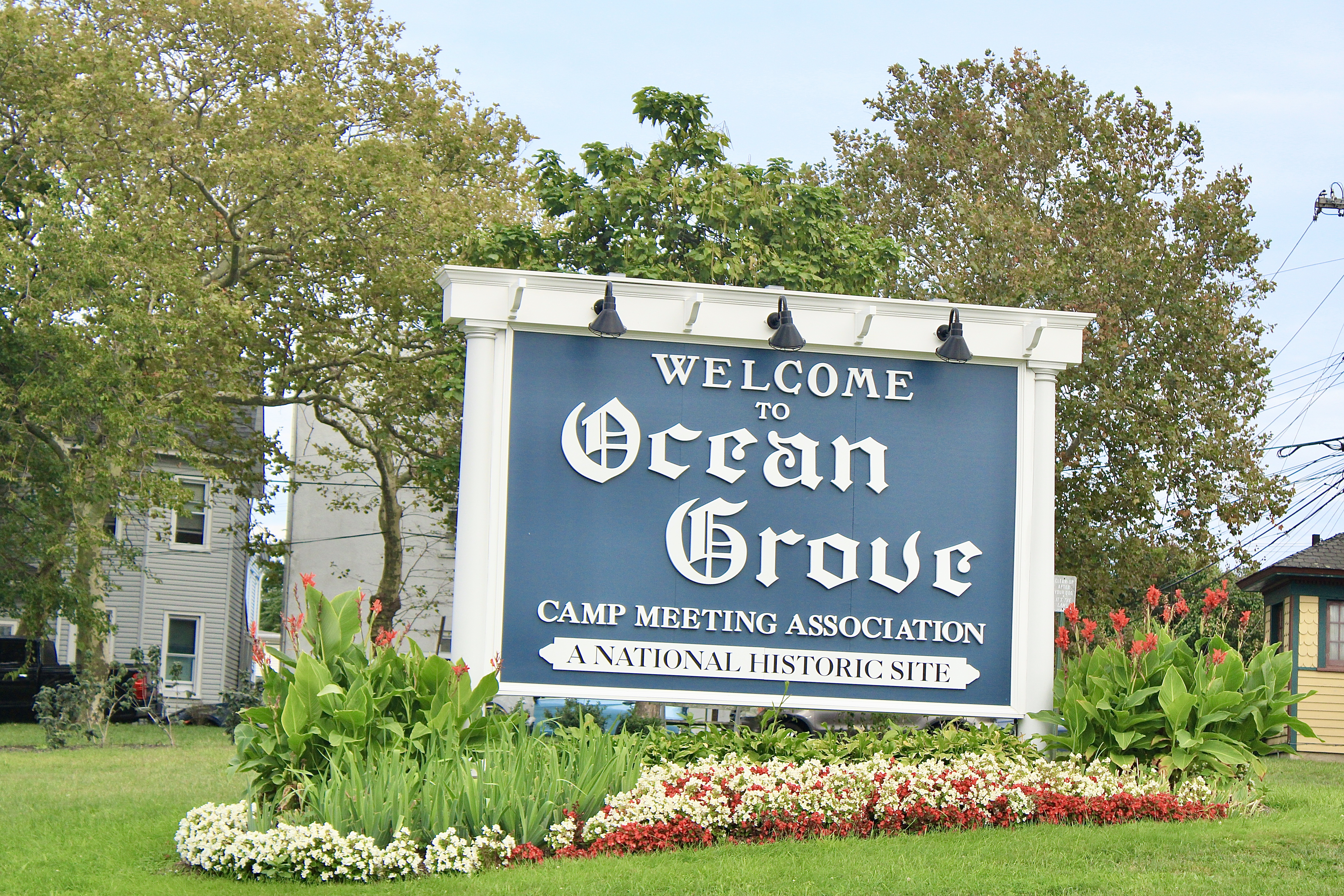
- Ocean Grove welcome sign

- Location in Monmouth County circled and highlighted in red (left). Inset map: Location of Monmouth County in New Jersey highlighted in orange (right).

- Location in Monmouth County Location in New Jersey Location in the United States
- Coordinates: 40.21182°N 74.006944°W
- Country: United States
- State: New Jersey
- County: Monmouth
- Township: Neptune

Area
  - Total: 0.42 sq mi (1.10 km^{2})
  - Land: 0.37 sq mi (0.96 km^{2})
  - Water: 0.054 sq mi (0.14 km^{2}) 13.05%
- Elevation: 16 ft (5 m)

Population (2020)
  - Total: 3,057
  - Density: 8,239.9/sq mi (3,181.4/km^{2})
- Time zone: UTC−05:00 (Eastern (EST))
  - Summer (DST): UTC−04:00 (Eastern (EDT))
- ZIP Code: 07756
- Area code: 732
- FIPS code: 34-54480
- GNIS feature ID: 02389609
- Website: oceangrove.org

Ocean Grove is an unincorporated community and census-designated place (CDP) that is part of Neptune Township, in Monmouth County, New Jersey, United States. It had a population of 3,057 at the 2020 census, down from 3,342 in 2010. It is located on the Atlantic Ocean's Jersey Shore, between Asbury Park to the north and Bradley Beach to the south. Listed on the National Register of Historic Places, Ocean Grove is noted for its abundant examples of Victorian architecture and for the Great Auditorium, acclaimed as "the state's most wondrous wooden structure, soaring and sweeping, alive with the sound of music." Another building, a former high school, is now the Jersey Shore Arts Center.

Ocean Grove was founded in 1869 as an outgrowth of the camp meeting movement in the United States, when a group of Methodist clergymen, led by William B. Osborn and Ellwood H. Stokes, formed the Ocean Grove Camp Meeting Association to develop and operate a summer camp meeting site on the New Jersey seashore. By the early 20th century, the popular Christian meeting ground became known as the "Queen of Religious Resorts". The community's land is still owned by the Camp Meeting Association and leased to individual homeowners and businesses. Ocean Grove remains the longest-active camp meeting site in the United States.

== History ==
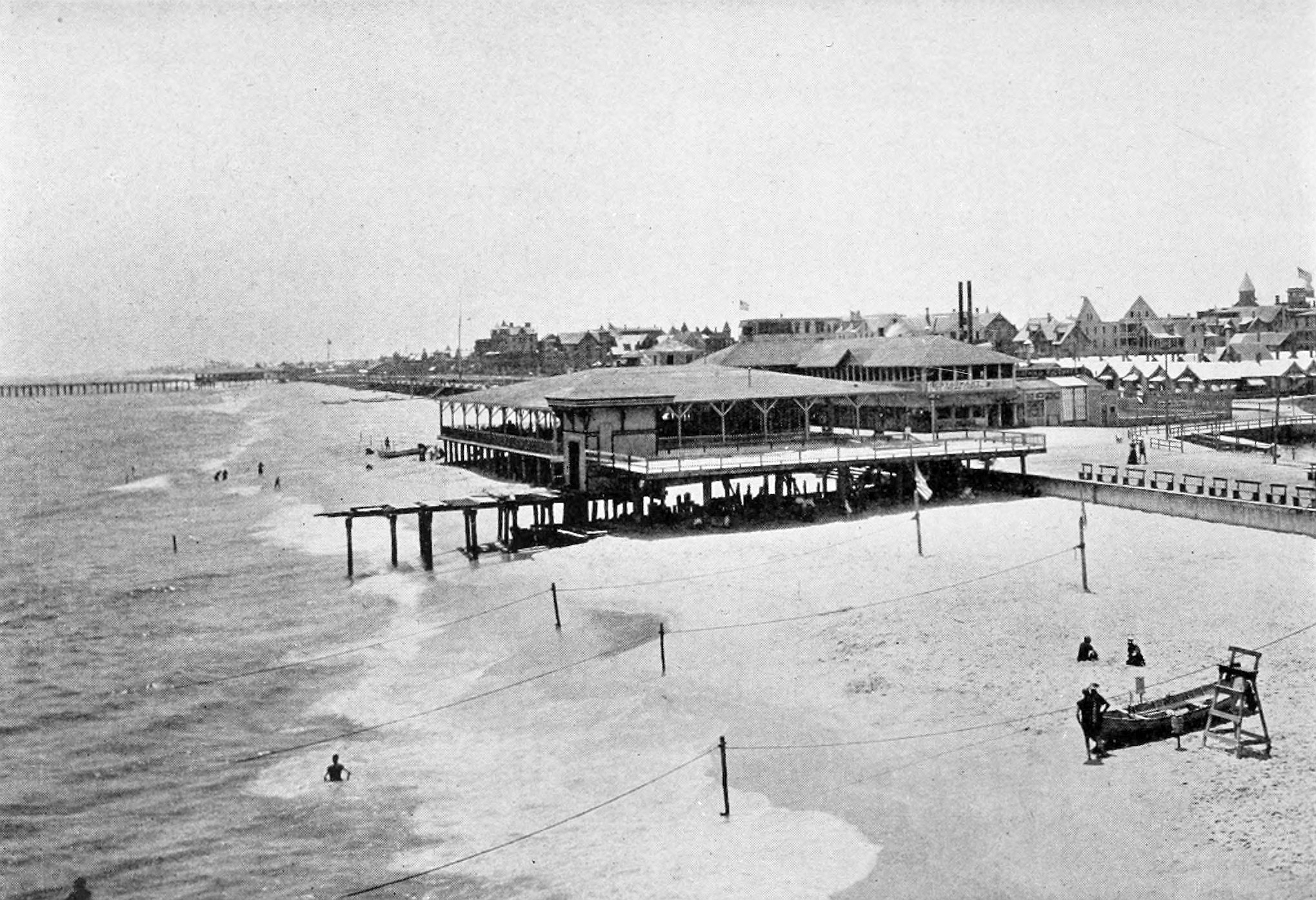
Ross' Pavilion in Ocean Grove, 1902

In July 1869, Reverend W. B. Osborn, Reverend Stokes, and other Methodist ministers camped at a shaded, well-drained spot on New Jersey's seashore and decided to establish a permanent Christian camp meeting community called "Ocean Grove". This followed a search of the Jersey Shore for a place not infested with mosquitoes. About twenty tents were pitched that summer. In 1870, the Ocean Grove Camp Meeting Association was incorporated and land was purchased. The property was laid out into 30-by-60-foot (9.1 by 18.3 m) lots and roadways. The lots were leased for 99 years with the Ocean Grove Camp Meeting Association retaining ownership. Residents were expected to follow the strict Methodist social norms of the era which included prohibitions of alcohol, tobacco, cards, dancing, the reading of novels, and chewing gum. Nine wells were driven in 1870 to provide fresh water. The first was eventually named the "Beersheba" well, for an ancient well used by the Biblical patriarchs Abraham and Isaac. It is still in existence under a photogenic 1881 gazebo, though belatedly connected to the town water system in 1911.

Drawing from the major population centers of New York City and Philadelphia, Ocean Grove soon became a popular destination during the growth of the camp meeting movement in post-Civil War America. Tents and an open-air wooden shelter for speakers were erected in the 1870s, for the trainloads of visitors arriving by the New York and Long Branch Railroad after 1875. In 1877 alone, 710,000 railroad tickets were sold for the Ocean Grove-Asbury Park train station.

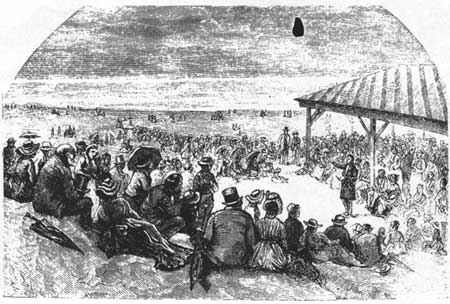
A Surfside Meeting in 1876
– Harper's Monthly

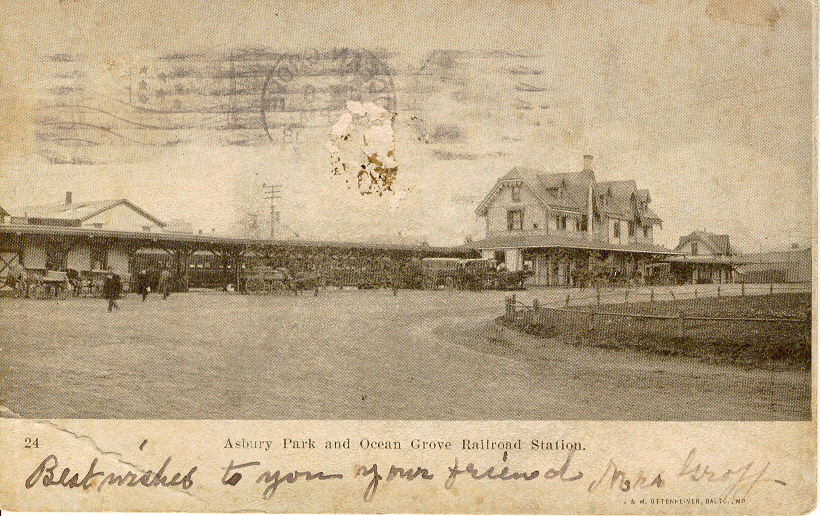
Postcard of Ocean Grove Railroad Station, dated 1908

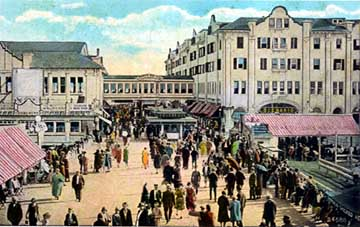
The "North End Hotel" had 255 rooms and a saltwater pool

A third, larger auditorium was built in 1880.

As Ocean Grove drew more and more visitors, the facilities were outgrown, and construction of the present Great Auditorium was completed in 1894. Originally designed to accommodate crowds of as many as 10,000 people, the subsequent installation of theater-style cushioned seating in many sections reduced seating capacity to 6,250. It remains Ocean Grove's most prominent structure and the centerpiece of its summer programs (see more about the Auditorium further down the page). By the early 20th century, said The New York Times in 1986, it was called the "Queen of Religious Resorts ... Visitors would travel miles to bask in the Victorian seaside splendor and to attend engaging, extroverted religious ceremonies. Millions of people, tourists and pilgrims both, made the trip to Ocean Grove every summer." The social disillusionment around 1920 following World War I had a profound effect on Ocean Grove and churchgoing in general. There was a decline in these activities and there was little in the way of new construction in the town after this time. One result was that Ocean Grove became a time capsule of late Victorian and early 20th century architecture.

Until Ocean Grove's municipal authority was folded into Neptune Township in 1981, it had its own set of unique laws, including one that made it illegal on Sundays to have horses, wagons, then cars on the streets of Ocean Grove. This had a significant effect on the development of a close-knit community. People looking to get away for the weekend typically avoided the Grove (the beach was closed on Sunday, too). That meant the visitors were likely to be coming for a week-long visit or more. Most came to attend programs sponsored by the Camp Meeting.

President Ulysses S. Grant visited Ocean Grove during his time in office and made his last public appearance in this town. Other presidents to speak on the grounds included James Garfield, William McKinley, Teddy Roosevelt, Woodrow Wilson, and Richard Nixon. Heavyweight boxing champions James J. Corbett and Max Baer and department store magnate F.W. Woolworth were among the celebrities of the day who vacationed in Ocean Grove.

In 1975, Ocean Grove was designated a State and National Historic District as a 19th-century planned urban community. It has the most extensive collection of Victorian and early-20th century architecture in the United States. The Historical Society of Ocean Grove maintains a museum and a restored c. 1884 cottage in addition to offering walking tours.

During the 1960s–1980s, the town declined along with much of the Jersey Shore, and was pejoratively called "Ocean Grave" due to the general air of decrepitude and the elderly population. But beginning in the 1990s, and through 2006, Ocean Grove experienced a dramatic increase in property values and a considerable revival in fortune, particularly with the restoration of older hotel structures, many of which had deteriorated into single-room occupancy ("SRO") quarters. As part of this resurgence, a number of sidewalk cafés and shops along Main Avenue (the main business thoroughfare) now cater to visitors and seasonal residents.

Plans were announced in 2006 for a major new hotel and condominium development on property which had been vacant since the 1970s, when the old North End Hotel – once Ocean Grove's largest – was damaged by fire and subsequently demolished in 1980. These plans became controversial though, and in January 2008 the Planning Board of Neptune stated the North End Redevelopment Proposal was "inconsistent with the town's Master Plan". On April 13, 2019, the remaining structures on the North End were destroyed by fire, leaving the whole area vacant land.

For the 2024 season, the camp meeting association began allowing Sunday access to its beach at weekday hours, while in a court battle with the New Jersey Department of Environmental Protection. This was later considered permanent after the department declared the camp meeting association could no longer restrict access on Sundays.

== Geography ==
Ocean Grove is in southeastern Monmouth County, in the eastern part of Neptune Township. It is the only part of Neptune Township to touch the Atlantic Ocean. New Jersey Route 71 (South Main Street) forms the western edge of the community. Route 71 leads north into Asbury Park and 5 miles (8 km) to the southern part of Long Branch, while to the south it passes through Bradley Beach and leads less than 3 miles (5 km) to Belmar. New Jersey Route 33 has its eastern terminus at Route 71 on the western border of Ocean Grove. Route 33 leads west 15 miles (24 km) to Freehold, the Monmouth county seat, and 50 miles (80 km) to Trenton, the state capital.

According to the U.S. Census Bureau, Ocean Grove has an area of 0.425 square miles (1.10 km^{2}), including 0.372 square miles (0.96 km^{2}) of land and 0.054 square miles (0.14 km^{2}) of water (12.71%).

== Demographics ==
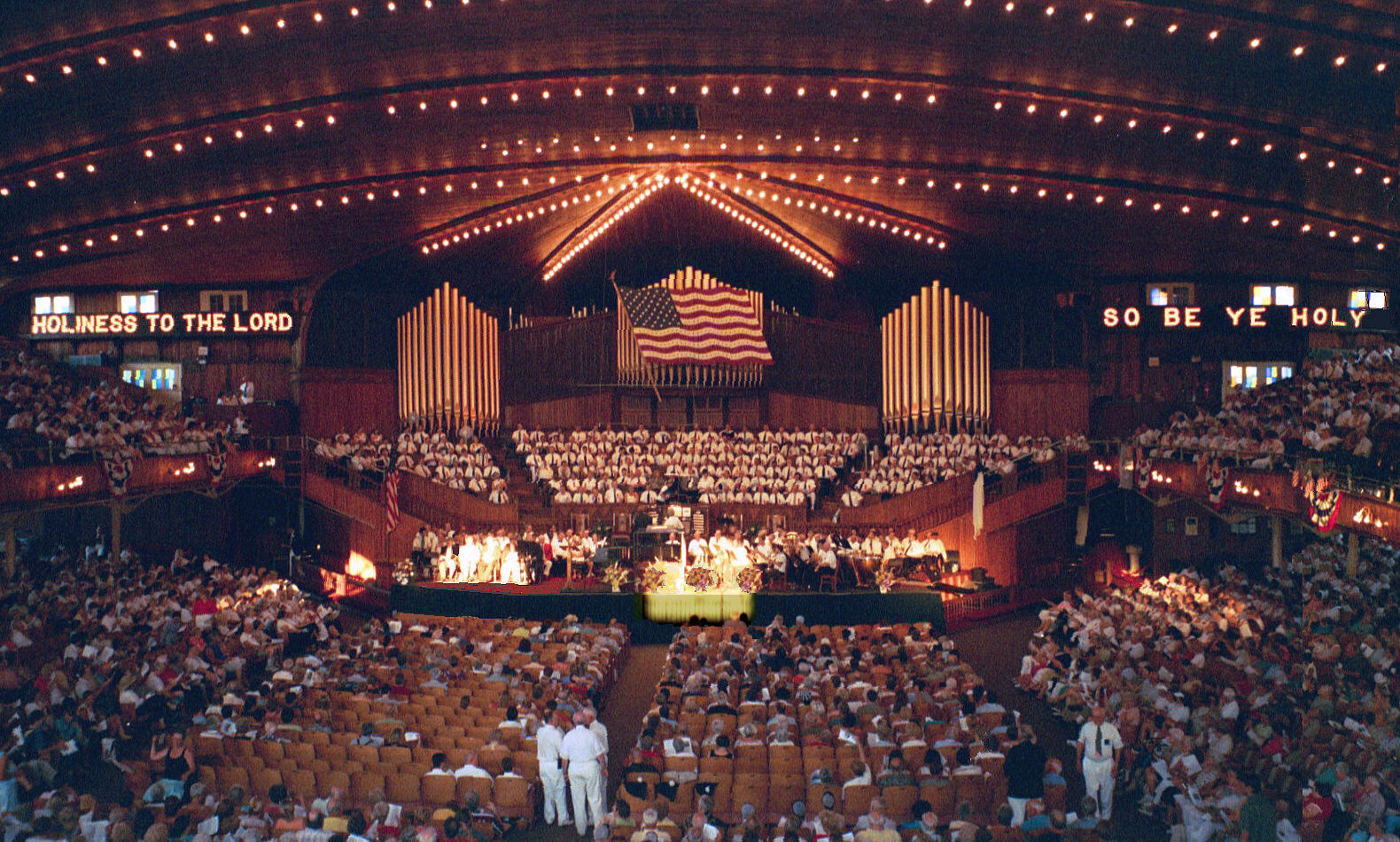
The Ocean Grove Great Auditorium (2007)

Historical population
| Census | Pop. | Note | %± |
|---|---|---|---|
| 1880 | 620 | | — |
| 1890 | 2,754 | | 344.2% |
| 1950 | 3,806 | | — |
| 1990 | 4,818 | | — |
| 2000 | 4,256 | | −11.7% |
| 2010 | 3,342 | | −21.5% |
| 2020 | 3,057 | | −8.5% |
Population sources: 1880-1890; 1950 1960 1970; 1980 1990 2000; 2010 2020

Because Ocean Grove is a summer resort community and many residences are unoccupied during the winter months, these statistics may not be representative of the population at all times of the year.

Ocean Grove appeared as an unincorporated community in the 1950 U.S. census. It did not appear in subsequent censuses until it was listed as a census designated place in the 1990 U.S. census.

=== Racial and ethnic composition ===
Ocean Grove CDP, New Jersey – Racial and ethnic composition Note: the US Census treats Hispanic/Latino as an ethnic category. This table excludes Latinos from the racial categories and assigns them to a separate category. Hispanics/Latinos may be of any race.
| Race / Ethnicity (NH = Non-Hispanic) | Pop 2000 | Pop 2010 | Pop 2020 | % 2000 | % 2010 | % 2020 |
|---|---|---|---|---|---|---|
| White alone (NH) | 3,868 | 2,958 | 2,607 | 90.88% | 88.51% | 85.28% |
| Black or African American alone (NH) | 156 | 177 | 113 | 3.67% | 5.30% | 3.70% |
| Native American or Alaska Native alone (NH) | 4 | 1 | 0 | 0.09% | 0.03% | 0.00% |
| Asian alone (NH) | 39 | 29 | 31 | 0.92% | 0.87% | 1.01% |
| Native Hawaiian or Pacific Islander alone (NH) | 1 | 1 | 4 | 0.02% | 0.03% | 0.13% |
| Other race alone (NH) | 3 | 2 | 12 | 0.07% | 0.06% | 0.39% |
| Mixed race or Multiracial (NH) | 31 | 29 | 87 | 0.73% | 0.87% | 2.85% |
| Hispanic or Latino (any race) | 154 | 145 | 203 | 3.62% | 4.34% | 6.64% |
| Total | 4,256 | 3,342 | 3,057 | 100.00% | 100.00% | 100.00% |

=== 2020 census ===
As of the 2020 census, Ocean Grove had a population of 3,057. The median age was 57.6 years. 5.5% of residents were under the age of 18 and 31.1% of residents were 65 years of age or older. For every 100 females there were 86.1 males, and for every 100 females age 18 and over there were 84.7 males age 18 and over.

100.0% of residents lived in urban areas, while 0.0% lived in rural areas.

There were 1,853 households in Ocean Grove, of which 7.0% had children under the age of 18 living in them. Of all households, 25.8% were married-couple households, 27.5% were households with a male householder and no spouse or partner present, and 39.2% were households with a female householder and no spouse or partner present. About 55.2% of all households were made up of individuals and 20.4% had someone living alone who was 65 years of age or older.

There were 3,123 housing units, of which 40.7% were vacant. The homeowner vacancy rate was 1.5% and the rental vacancy rate was 16.4%.

=== 2010 census ===
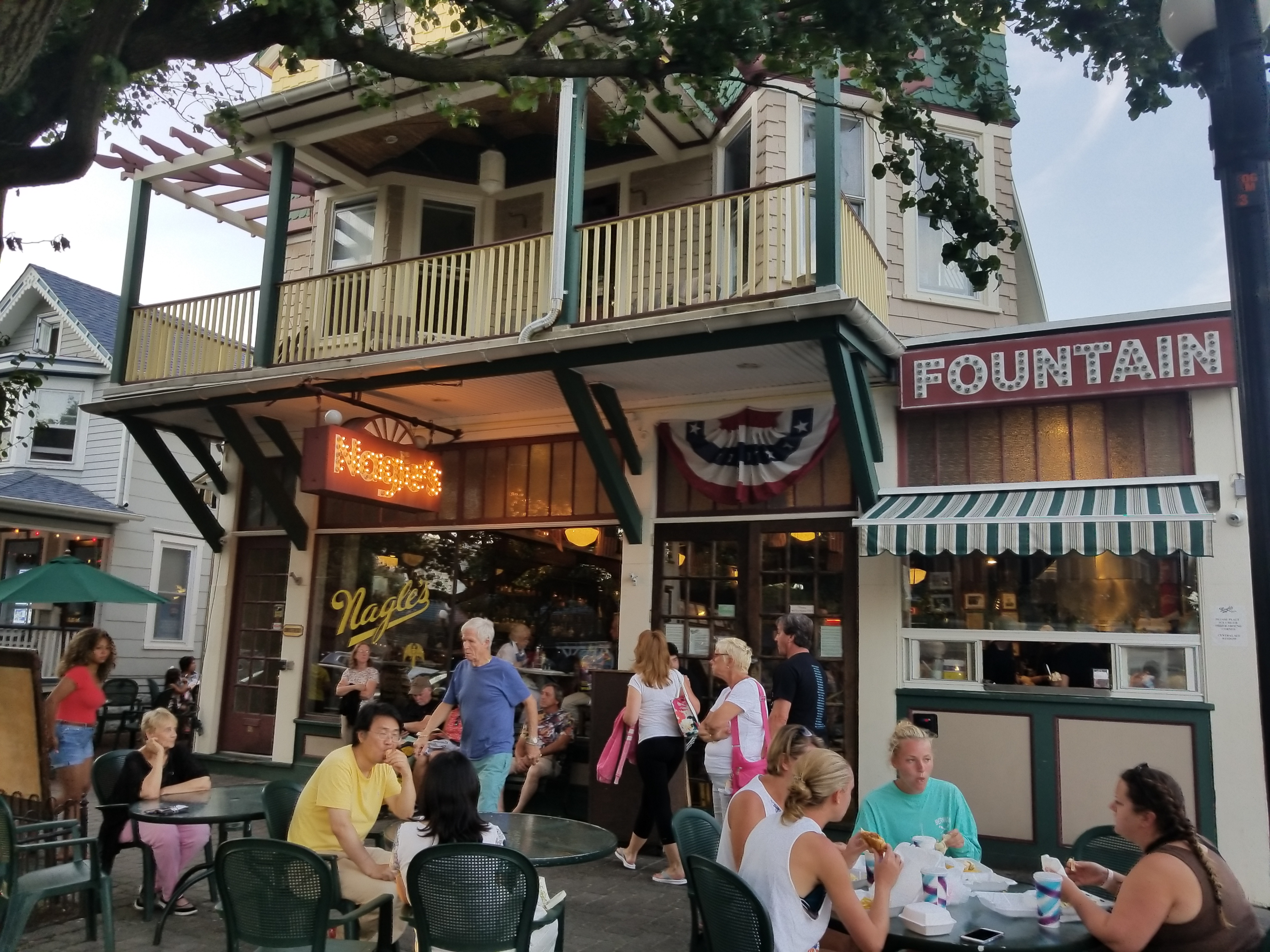
Cafe in Ocean Grove

The 2010 United States census counted 3,342 people, 1,948 households, and 616 families in the CDP. The population density was 8,979.9 people per square mile (3,467.2 people/km^{2}). There were 3,132 housing units at an average density of 8,415.6 units per square mile (3,249.3 units/km^{2}). The racial makeup was 91.41% (3,055) White, 5.48% (183) Black or African American, 0.03% (1) Native American, 0.87% (29) Asian, 0.03% (1) Pacific Islander, 0.81% (27) from other races, and 1.38% (46) from two or more races. Hispanic or Latino of any race were 4.34% (145) of the population.

Of the 1,948 households, 7.9% had children under the age of 18; 23.0% were married couples living together; 6.3% had a female householder with no husband present and 68.4% were non-families. Of all households, 57.2% were made up of individuals and 17.4% had someone living alone who was 65 years of age or older. The average household size was 1.64 and the average family size was 2.56.

8.1% of the population were under the age of 18, 4.8% from 18 to 24, 23.7% from 25 to 44, 38.9% from 45 to 64, and 24.5% who were 65 years of age or older. The median age was 52.7 years. For every 100 females, the population had 83.2 males. For every 100 females ages 18 and older there were 80.6 males.

=== 2000 census ===
As of the 2000 United States census there were 4,256 people, 2,331 households, and 785 families residing in the CDP. The population density was 4,564.6 people/km^{2} (11,822 people/mi^{2}). There were 3,156 housing units at an average density of 3,384.8 units/km^{2} (8,767 units/mi^{2}). The racial makeup of the CDP was 93.1% White, 4.0% African American, 0.1% Native American, 1.0% Asian, <0.1% Pacific Islander, 0.9% from other races, and 0.9% from two or more races. Hispanic or Latino of any race were 3.6% of the population.

There were 2,331 households, out of which 10.0% had children under the age of 18 living with them, 23.6% were married couples living together, 7.7% had a female householder with no husband present, and 66.3% were non-families. 56.6% of all households were made up of individuals, and 14.5% had someone living alone who was 65 years of age or older. The average household size was 1.67 and the average family size was 2.59.

In the CDP the population was spread out, with 9.9% under the age of 18, 5.8% from 18 to 24, 33.5% from 25 to 44, 26.4% from 45 to 64, and 24.4% who were 65 years of age or older. The median age was 45 years. For every 100 females, there were 82.4 males. For every 100 females age 18 and over, there were 81.1 males.

The median income for a household in the CDP was $31,935, and the median income for a family was $58,583. Males had a median income of $38,389 versus $31,886 for females. The per capita income for the CDP was $26,232. About 5.1% of families and 13.3% of the population were below the poverty line, including 12.0% of those under age 18 and 5.5% of those age 65 or over.

== Governance ==
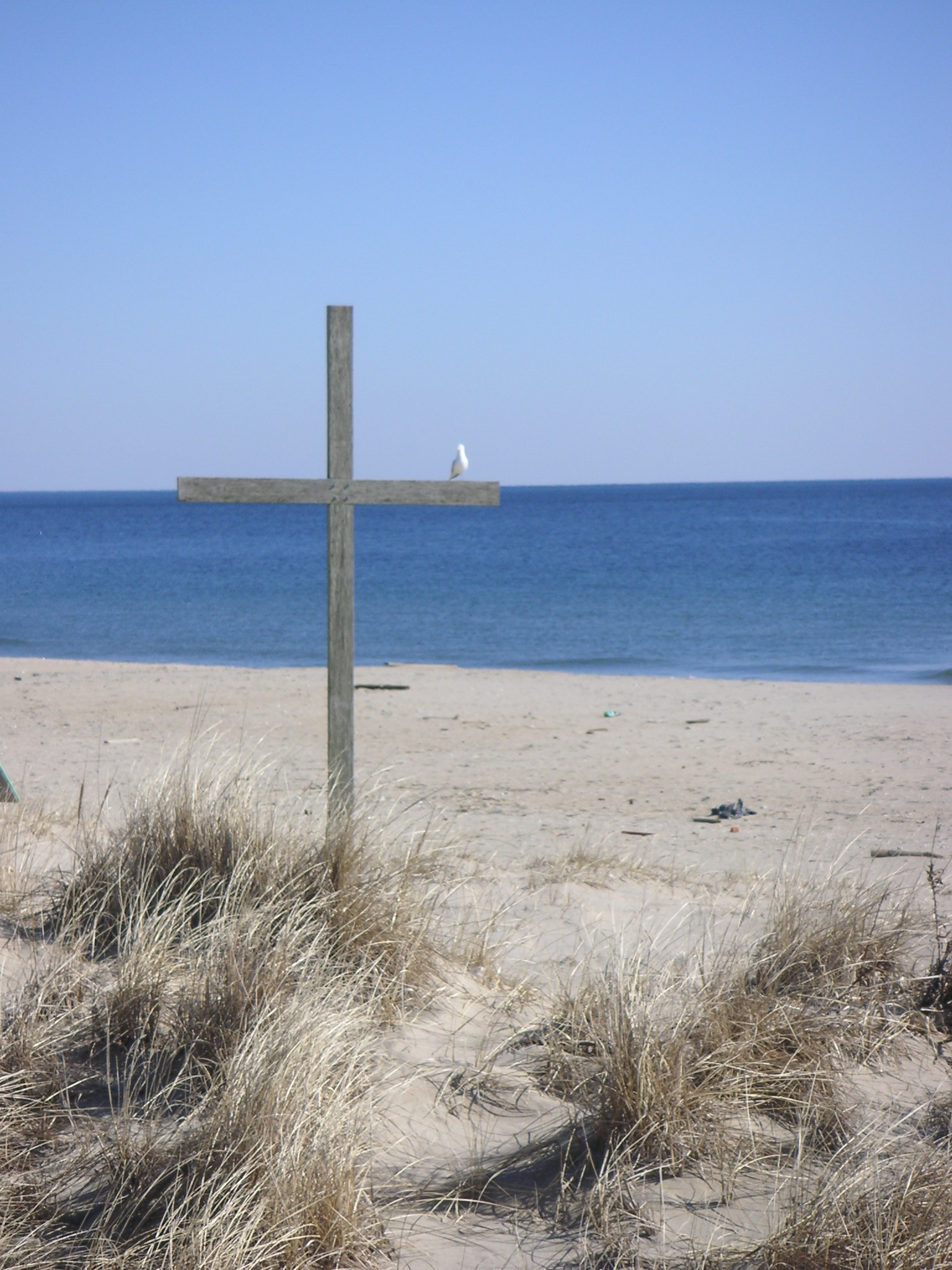
Ocean Grove's beach

The desire to develop a Christian seaside community for summer worship and relaxation led William B. Osborn (1832–1902), a leader of the camp meeting movement in mid-19th century America, to select the site of present-day Ocean Grove for its wooded, mosquito-free location. Ellwood H. Stokes (1815–1895), a Methodist minister from Philadelphia, and others joined to purchase a square mile of land fronting on the Atlantic Ocean. A state charter was issued to the newly formed Ocean Grove Camp Meeting Association on March 3, 1870, granting the 26 trustees (13 ministers and 13 lay persons) the authority to purchase and hold one square mile of real estate comprising Ocean Grove (though Ocean Grove today is less than 0.5 square miles), and to construct and maintain all necessary works to supply the community with utilities and other municipal services, including law enforcement.

Later, efforts to establish a separate borough of Ocean Grove were attempted many times. Ocean Grove was incorporated as a borough by an act of the New Jersey Legislature on April 5, 1920, from portions of Neptune Township, but the New Jersey Court of Errors and Appeals ruled the municipality unconstitutional on May 12, 1921, and the borough was dissolved as of June 16, 1921.

Although Ocean Grove reverted to being a part of Neptune Township with the court's decision of 1921, the Camp Meeting Association continued to exercise local ordinance enforcement powers until 1981, when a newspaper deliverer successfully sued to end the resort's blue law banning Sunday vehicular traffic and requiring it to disband its police force and "municipal" court. The Camp Meeting still owns all the land in the community and leases it to homeowners and businesses for 99-year renewable terms. The Camp Meeting Association kept its beach closed on Sunday mornings until the New Jersey Department of Environmental Protection ruled in 2025 that it must open the beach seven days a week, as beach replenishment projects and other enhancements have been made to the beach using state funds. Ocean Grove is still "dry", that is, the sale of all alcoholic beverages is prohibited.

== The Great Auditorium ==
The Great Auditorium was constructed in 1894 and is mostly unchanged except for the front end that was extended for the 1908 Hope-Jones organ. The wooden building rests on bridge-like steel trusses laid on stone foundations. It features numerous "barn door" entrances with colored glass, dormers, and panels that open for ventilation. Originally, the Auditorium was claimed to hold an audience of almost 10,000. Many of smaller, wooden seats were replaced in later years with cushioned, theater-style seating, reducing capacity to an audience of 6,250 persons.

The Auditorium has been called, "the state's most wondrous wooden structure, soaring and sweeping, alive with the sound of music." Its superb acoustics, resulting from its barrel-vaulted wooden ceiling, have been widely acclaimed; famed conductor Leonard Bernstein once compared it to Carnegie Hall. Despite his kind words and local enthusiasm, the Auditorium has little reverberation when its many doors and panels are open. It also has multiple echoes rendering it a questionable concert hall. Scientific acoustics was still in its infancy when it was built.

In the days before electronic amplification, this allowed a preacher to be heard throughout the vast space. The building features a lighting system advanced for its time: arching rows of bulbs hanging from the varnished wood ceiling paneling. Also novel is a painted representation of a waving American flag (c. 1916 and rebuilt) covered with light bulbs that flash in an undulating manner. Illuminated signs, possibly the very oldest surviving examples of that type (1894), proclaim "Holiness to the Lord" and "So be ye holy", a reflection of the emphasis at camp meetings. The illuminated Memorial Cross was placed on the Auditorium's front façade at the end of World War II in 1946.

The hall is surrounded by 114 tents, which are occupied from May to September, as has been the case since 1869. Each tent is connected to a shed containing a kitchen and bathroom; the sheds are also used to store the tents during the winter. They are in such demand that there is a waiting list of some ten years for summer rentals.

=== Organ ===
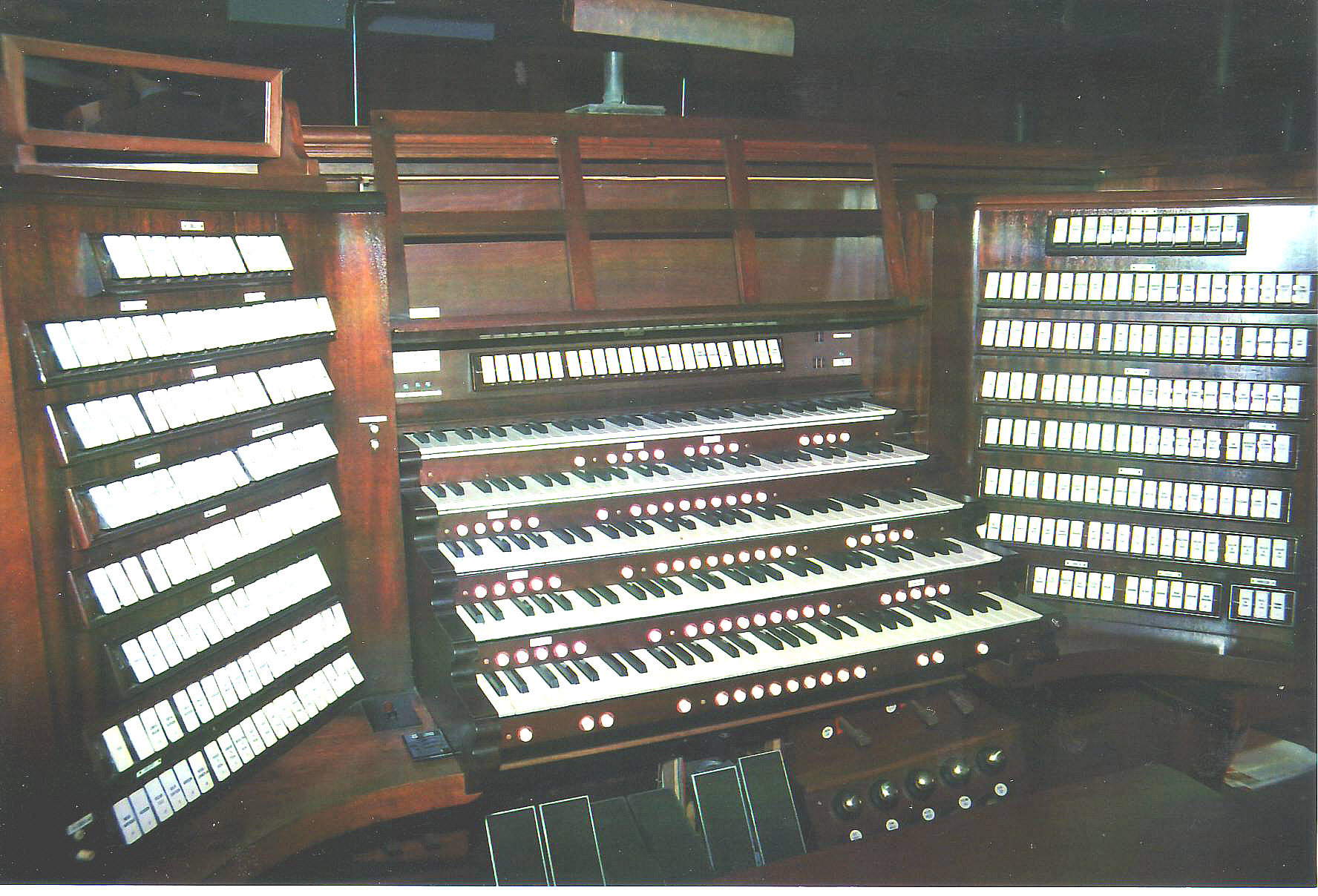
The organ console in 2012

The Auditorium's pipe organ is the 17th largest in the world. Installed in 1908 by the organ builder Robert Hope-Jones, its components have been rebuilt and expanded several times, especially since resident organist Gordon Turk and curator John Shaw (who died on July 24, 2019) took their posts in 1974 and 1975, respectively. Additions made in the 21st century include a 14-rank echo division in 2008, in an effort to broaden the resources necessary to play repertoire of many styles and periods, and to restore those stops unique to the instrument as Hope-Jones conceived it. In the 2010s, the organ continued to be further enlarged and revoiced, with additions underwritten by donors. As of July 2018, the organ has five manuals, 202 ranks, and 12,200 total pipes. About 75 percent of the original Hope-Jones pipework remains extant, according to John Shaw.

Prominent organists to have played the Ocean Grove Auditorium organ include Edwin H. Lemare, Pietro Yon, and Frederick Swann. Celebrated organist Virgil Fox gave his last solo concert in the building in 1980. Turk and guest concert organists play free recitals on most Wednesday evenings and Saturday afternoons in July and August.

A popular organ piece, often played in the early years of the organ, was "The Storm", which featured the stops of the organ for thunder, lightning, rain, and birds singing. An article in The New York Times from 1909 reports on the annoyance of some nearby residents at the frequent repetition of the performances of the piece.

=== Performances and other events ===
The Great Auditorium has over the years featured famed hymn writer Fanny Crosby, band leader John Philip Sousa, and tenor Enrico Caruso. More recently, singers Tony Bennett, Mel Tormé, Kenny Rogers, and Ray Charles have performed there. Other concerts filling the summer schedule have included the acclaimed Summer Stars chamber music programs, which bring some of the finest classical musicians from Philadelphia and New York each Thursday night in July and early August. Saturday nights have featured popular entertainment, including appearances by Johnny Mathis, Ronan Tynan, Linda Eder, the Beach Boys, comedian Bill Cosby, and Christian rock stars such as Michael W. Smith, Steven Curtis Chapman, Nichole Nordeman, Hillsong United, and Sonic Flood. In 2017, the CMA announced it would be cutting back on secular concerts in the Auditorium, and they have since been stopped altogether in favor of Christian programming, with the exception of classical and patriotic performances.

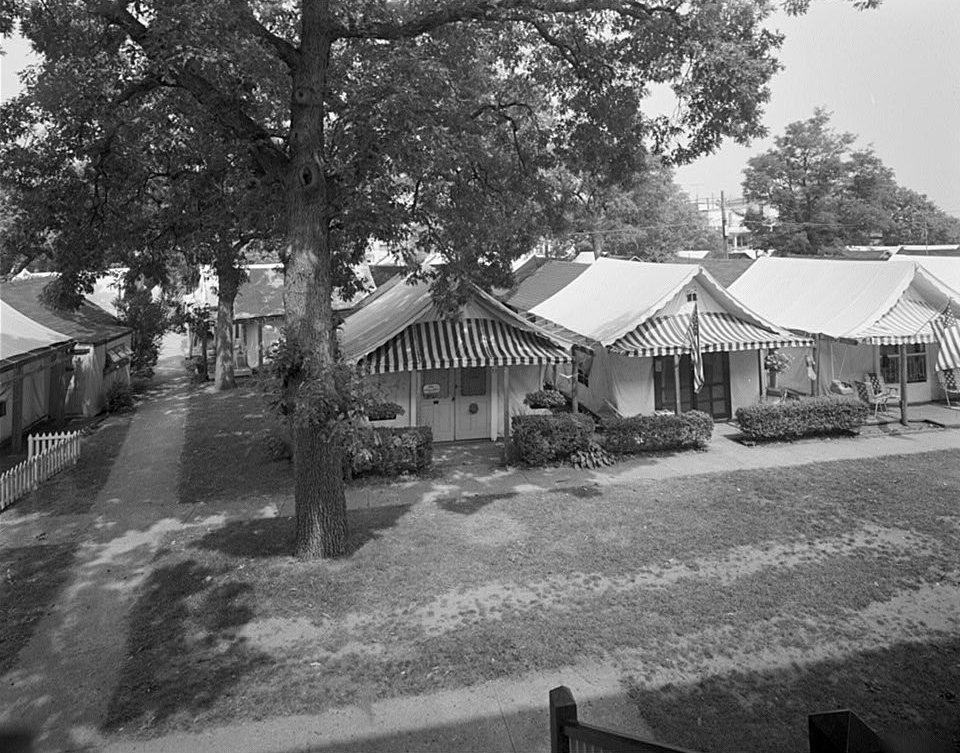
Tents around the Great Auditorium

Since 1980, the Auditorium has hosted an annual memorial service for New Jersey law enforcement officers killed in the line of duty. The service includes a full honor guard, bagpipe procession, and singing by state high school choirs (Princeton High School and both West Windsor-Plainsboro High School choirs have performed in the past). Police, soldiers, National Guardsmen, executive-level officials, and the governor typically attend.

The Auditorium is also used during the month of June for high school graduation ceremonies.

== Ocean Grove Camp Meeting Association ==
- Ocean Grove Camp Meeting Association District
- U.S. National Register of Historic Places
- U.S. Historic district
- New Jersey Register of Historic Places
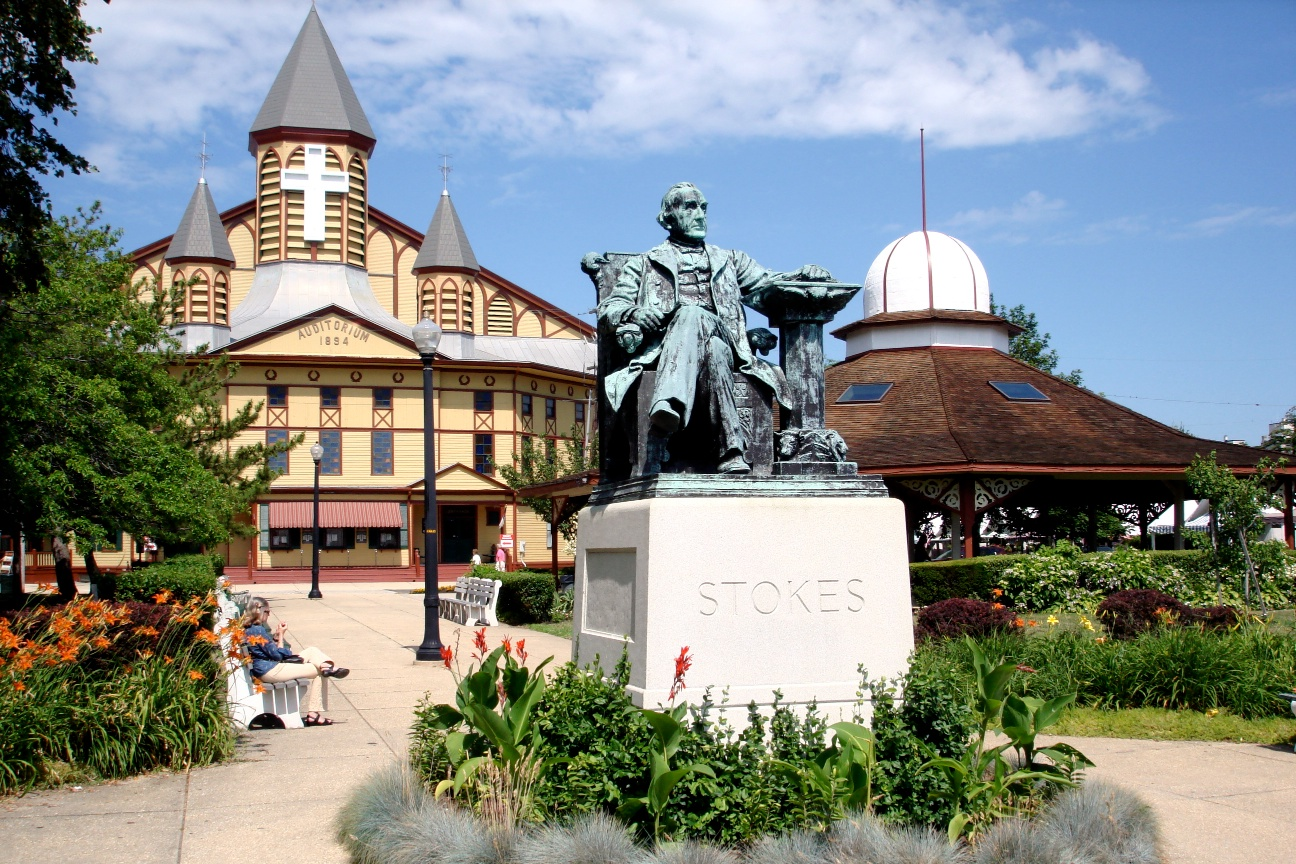
- A statue of Ellwood H. Stokes and the Great Auditorium facing Ocean Pathway – once named one of the ten most beautiful streets in America
- Location: Bounded by Fletcher Lake, NJ Route 71, Lake Wesley, and the Atlantic Ocean
- Area: 220 acres (89 ha)
- Architectural style: Bungalow/craftsman, Stick/eastlake, Queen Anne
- NRHP reference No.: 76001170
- NJRHP No.: 2036

Significant dates
- Added to NRHP: April 12, 1976
- Designated NJRHP: December 16, 1975

The OGCMA was established in 1869 and incorporated in 1870. Its mission is to "provide opportunities for spiritual birth, growth, and renewal in a Christian seaside setting."

=== Tent City ===
From May to September of each year, 114 tents are erected around the Great Auditorium. These tents form "Tent City", a tradition of the Camp Meeting Association that dates back to 1869. Each tent is connected to a shed containing a kitchen and bathroom; the sheds are also used to store the tents during the winter. Tents are in such demand that there is a waiting list of over ten years for summer rentals. Rent runs from $4,000 to $6,000 per summer. All prospective tent inhabitants are interviewed. Subletting of tents is not allowed; dogs, cats, and barbecuing are also prohibited. Tent inhabitants do not have to be Methodist, but they do have to support the association's spiritual missions.

=== Programs ===
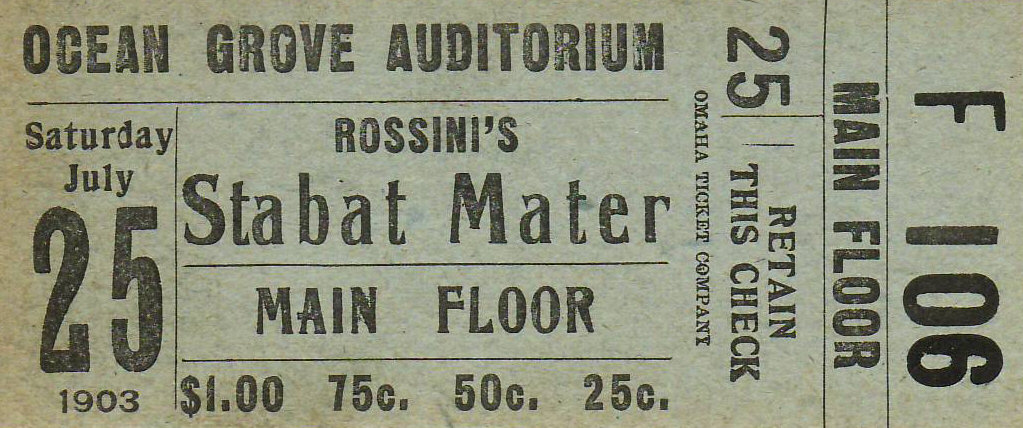
Ticket to Rossini's Stabat Mater, performed in 1903

The Camp Meeting offers traditional and contemporary worship programs throughout the summer. Sunday worship services are held in the Great Auditorium. These services have featured preachers such as Billy Graham, Norman Vincent Peale, Robert H. Schuller, Billy Sunday, Ralph W. Sockman, David H. C. Read, Frank Thewlis, Tony Campolo, James A. Forbes, D. James Kennedy, Charles Stanley, William Jennings Bryan, Booker T. Washington, and Rodney "Gipsy" Smith.

The music is led by a volunteer choir, along with professional soloists such as Ronald Naldi. Gordon Turk accompanies at the Hope-Jones organ. Jason Tramm is the musical director. Lewis A. Daniels Sr. (1927–2012) was director of music from 1966 to 2004. Since 1955, the annual Choir Festival held in July has gathered thousands of church choir singers, predominantly from the northeastern U.S., to sing "to the glory of God". In 1986, New York television station WNET featured the Choir Festival on its Summerfare program. The Choir Festival is also a regular feature on the Sacred Classics radio broadcast.

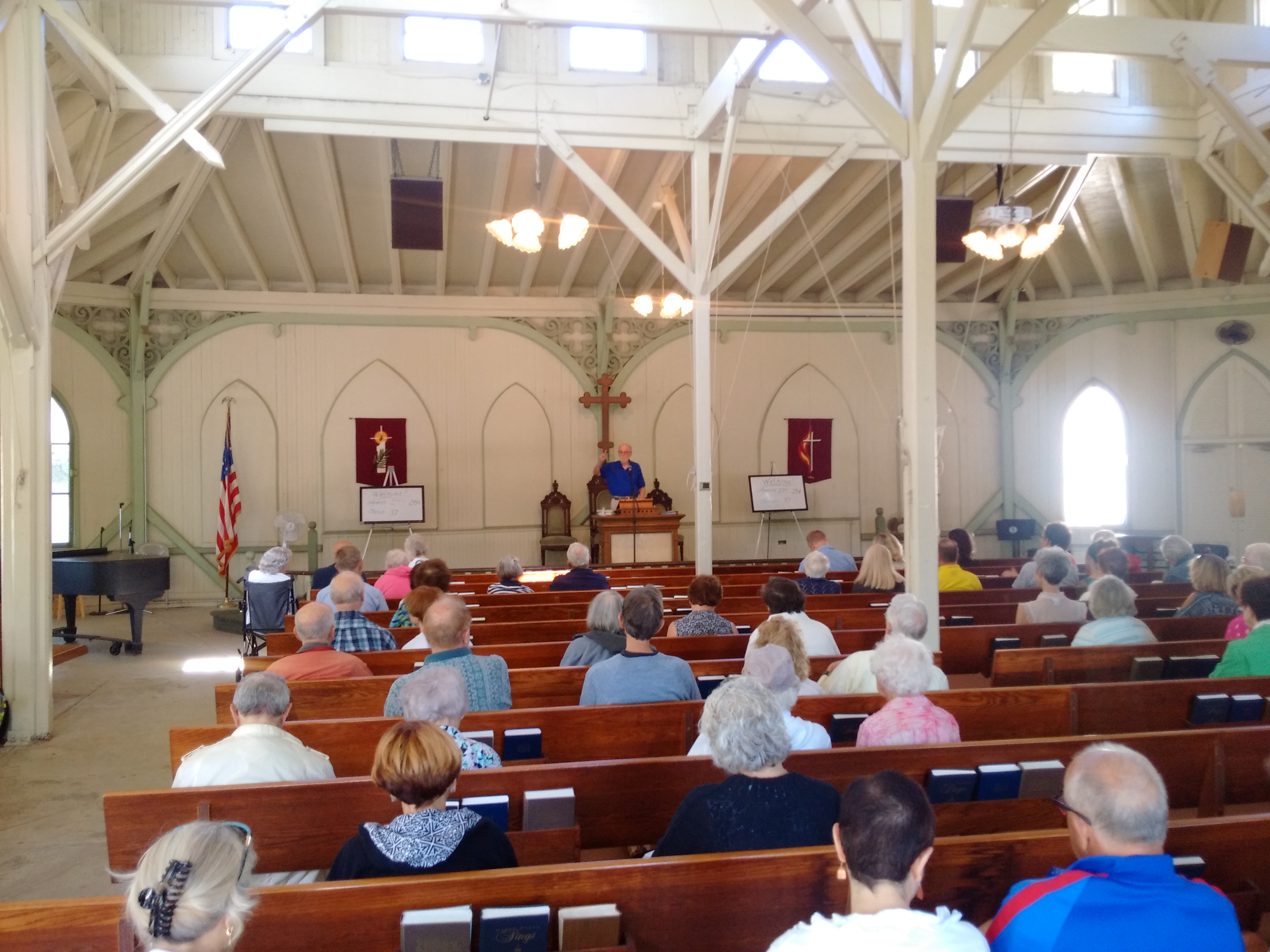
Stuart Briscoe speaking at the Bishop Janes Tabernacle in 2018

The Camp Meeting also offers a contemporary worship service, "Pavilion Praise", in the beach's Boardwalk Pavilion each Sunday morning. A Bible Hour is held each weekday morning in the Bishop Janes Tabernacle, built in 1877, adjacent to the Great Auditorium.

"Bridgefest", an annual two-day event, brings contemporary Christian music to young people and their families. The event is promoted by New York–area radio station "Bridge FM" (WRDR-FM).

== Hurricane Sandy ==
In 2012, Hurricane Sandy caused extensive damage in Ocean Grove. Over half of the town's boardwalk was destroyed, and the town's fishing pier was significantly damaged. Ocean Grove was denied Federal Emergency Management Agency funding because the Camp Meeting Association is a nonprofit organization. While nonprofit organizations are eligible to receive FEMA funding, Ocean Grove was denied funding because the boardwalk was classified as being used solely for recreational purposes. The town formed a group called "Together" to address storm recovery. The group includes the Camp Meeting Association, the chamber of commerce, the homeowners association, the beautification committee, the historic society, the fishing club, and Ocean Grove United, a gay and lesbian group.

Hurricane repairs were estimated to cost $3.5 million. The "Together" campaign raised $1.5 million, including $750,000 for the boardwalk, $100,000 for the roof of the Great Auditorium, and $500,000 for architectural and structural repairs to Thornley Chapel. The Camp Meeting Association appealed FEMA's funding rejection three times. Federal officials also denied the Camp Meeting Association's request for funding in the wake of Hurricane Irene.

In 2013, members of the gay-rights group Ocean Grove United and the OGCMA joined up to co-sponsor an event aimed at raising funds to rebuild Ocean Grove's hurricane-damaged boardwalk.

The third appeal by OGCMA to FEMA, supported by some New Jersey politicians, was accepted. As MaryAnn Spoto elucidated on NJ.com in 2014: "The storm destroyed about a third of Ocean Grove's nearly half-mile of boardwalk.... FEMA's $2.3 million to Ocean Grove includes $1.13 million for that project as well as money for three other recovery projects."

== Gay relations ==
From the late 1990s through 2000s, Ocean Grove saw the opening of a large number of gay-owned restaurants, hotels, and stores. According to The New York Times, Ocean Grove's gay and Methodist populations coexisted peacefully until a 2007 controversy over whether gay couples could conduct civil unions at the Camp Meeting Association's Boardwalk Pavilion. Previously, the Association sought to realize income from its structures by renting them as wedding venues. There were no religious restrictions placed on the ceremonies. Also according to the Times, "Ocean Grove has long been considered a community that embraced gay residents." In 2007, a representative of Garden State Equality, an LGBT rights advocacy organization, said: "I'm hearing from gay people all over the country who thought Ocean Grove was the leading light for gay tolerance and that's not the case anymore."

In 2012, Christian actor Kirk Cameron gave a lecture in Ocean Grove on the subject of strengthening marriage. Cameron's lecture sparked a protest by gay rights activists. After Cameron's speech, a lunch was arranged between members of the Camp Meeting Association and members of the gay community. Camp Meeting Association President Dale Whilden said, "This is an opportunity to show that we respect them." Democratic congressman Frank Pallone attended the event. Steven Goldstein of Garden State Equality noted: "We may not agree on everything, but we are, today, starting to see each other as human beings."

In 2013, the Human Rights Campaign, an LGBT rights advocacy group, included Ocean Grove in its Municipal Equality Index, a study that scores 291 American cities based on their inclusivity of LGBT people. Ocean Grove scored 77 out of 100, representing the second highest score for cities located in New Jersey.

In July 2022 the CMA unveiled the design for the new fishing pier, which had been destroyed by Hurricane Sandy, in the form of a cross. Some members of the LGBTQ+ and secular community were upset that neighborhood input was not sought before the plans were finalized and that the donors were not informed of the design ahead of time. They reached out to local and state officials hoping to delay the start of construction until the matter could be fully reviewed.

=== Civil union controversy ===
In 2007, two lesbian couples asked to have their civil union ceremonies at the OGCMA's Boardwalk Pavilion. According to The New York Times, "the couples' requests were rejected, and they complained to the state's Division on Civil Rights, which began a discrimination investigation." The complaint stated that Scott Rasmussen, on behalf of the OGCMA, informed the couple it would not permit them to use the OGCMA's facilities for a civil union. In 2008, the New Jersey Division of Civil Rights found that there was probable cause to credit one of the two couples' complaints, but rejected the other.

In an attempt to halt the state's investigation, the OGCMA filed a federal suit. In the suit, the OGCMA wrote that it would be "thrust into government compelled expressive association with those who promote same-sex 'civil unions'" if it is forced to allow them at its facilities, and "such forced association would severely compromise the Association's desire to communicate to the general public a message consistent with its religious views on marriage and family." The OGCMA's motion was dismissed.

Complicating the dispute over civil unions was the fact that Ocean Grove's boardwalk and beachfront were held in a 1908 ruling to be exempt from property tax because they "had been dedicated years ago by the association as a public highway." The Boardwalk Pavilion lost its tax-exempt status in 2007 because the state ruled that it no longer met the requirements as a place open to all members of the public. From 1989 until the Pavilion lost its tax-exempt status, the OGCMA had received $500,000 in annual tax breaks through the state's Green Acres program. The boardwalk and beach remain tax-exempt.

On January 12, 2012, Administrative Law Judge Solomon Metzger ruled that the Camp Meeting had violated the state's law against discrimination. The OGCMA discontinued use of the pavilion for weddings for the general public after the controversy started. While the Association reports that it no longer offers any of its property to the general public as wedding venues, they have a process in place that grants use on an exception basis, provided the couple meets additional criteria.

== Transportation ==
=== Roads and highways ===
Interstate 195 provides highway access to Ocean Grove from the New Jersey Turnpike, Philadelphia, and points west. I-195 has its eastern terminus 6 miles (10 km) southwest of Ocean Grove at the Garden State Parkway, which connects the community with points north and south, such as New York City and Atlantic City.

=== Public transportation ===
Frequent rail passenger service to New York City is provided by NJ Transit on the North Jersey Coast Line from the nearby Asbury Park station. New Jersey Transit offers bus service between Ocean Grove and Philadelphia on the 317 route and local service on the 830 route. Additionally, Academy Bus has regular service to area shore towns and the Port Authority Bus Terminal in Midtown Manhattan.

The nearest airport having scheduled commercial airline service is Newark Liberty International Airport, 45 miles (72 km) north, while Monmouth Executive Airport for general aviation airplanes is just 6 miles (10 km) away.

== Climate ==
According to the Köppen climate classification system, Ocean Grove has a humid subtropical climate (Cfa). Cfa climates are characterized by all months having an average temperature above 32.0 °F (0.0 °C), at least four months with an average temperature at or above 50.0 °F (10.0 °C), at least one month with an average temperature at or above 71.6 °F (22.0 °C) and no significant precipitation difference between seasons. Although most summer days are slightly humid with a cooling afternoon sea breeze in Ocean Grove, episodes of heat and high humidity can occur with heat index values above 103 °F (39 °C). Since 1981, the highest air temperature was 100.3 °F (37.9 °C) on August 9, 2001, and the highest daily average mean dew point was 77.4 °F (25.2 °C) on August 13, 2016. The average wettest month is July which correlates with the peak in thunderstorm activity. Since 1981, the wettest calendar day was 5.56 inches (14 cm) on August 27, 2011. During the winter months, the average annual extreme minimum air temperature is 3.8 °F (−15.7 °C). Since 1981, the coldest air temperature was −5.7 °F (−20.9 °C) on January 22, 1984. Episodes of extreme cold and wind can occur with wind chill values below −6 °F (−21 °C). The average seasonal (November–April) snowfall total is 18 to 24 inches (46 to 61 cm), and the average snowiest month is February which corresponds with the annual peak in nor'easter activity.

Climate data for Ocean Grove, 1981-2010 normals, extremes 1981-2019
| Month | Jan | Feb | Mar | Apr | May | Jun | Jul | Aug | Sep | Oct | Nov | Dec | Year |
|---|---|---|---|---|---|---|---|---|---|---|---|---|---|
| Record high °F (°C) | 71.6 (22.0) | 78.8 (26.0) | 82.1 (27.8) | 88.8 (31.6) | 94.9 (34.9) | 96.8 (36.0) | 99.8 (37.7) | 100.3 (37.9) | 97.5 (36.4) | 93.9 (34.4) | 80.7 (27.1) | 75.0 (23.9) | 100.3 (37.9) |
| Mean daily maximum °F (°C) | 40.1 (4.5) | 42.7 (5.9) | 49.2 (9.6) | 58.7 (14.8) | 68.2 (20.1) | 77.5 (25.3) | 82.8 (28.2) | 81.7 (27.6) | 75.5 (24.2) | 65.1 (18.4) | 55.3 (12.9) | 45.2 (7.3) | 61.9 (16.6) |
| Daily mean °F (°C) | 32.4 (0.2) | 34.8 (1.6) | 40.9 (4.9) | 50.3 (10.2) | 59.9 (15.5) | 69.4 (20.8) | 74.9 (23.8) | 73.9 (23.3) | 67.3 (19.6) | 56.4 (13.6) | 47.3 (8.5) | 37.7 (3.2) | 53.9 (12.2) |
| Mean daily minimum °F (°C) | 24.8 (−4.0) | 26.8 (−2.9) | 32.7 (0.4) | 41.9 (5.5) | 51.5 (10.8) | 61.2 (16.2) | 67.0 (19.4) | 66.0 (18.9) | 59.1 (15.1) | 47.6 (8.7) | 39.2 (4.0) | 30.1 (−1.1) | 45.7 (7.6) |
| Record low °F (°C) | −5.7 (−20.9) | 1.0 (−17.2) | 6.0 (−14.4) | 18.3 (−7.6) | 35.4 (1.9) | 44.8 (7.1) | 48.9 (9.4) | 45.5 (7.5) | 39.5 (4.2) | 26.7 (−2.9) | 15.1 (−9.4) | −0.2 (−17.9) | −5.7 (−20.9) |
| Average precipitation inches (mm) | 3.62 (92) | 3.07 (78) | 3.97 (101) | 4.12 (105) | 3.75 (95) | 3.61 (92) | 4.70 (119) | 4.66 (118) | 3.59 (91) | 3.90 (99) | 3.88 (99) | 4.02 (102) | 46.89 (1,191) |
| Average relative humidity (%) | 64.6 | 61.7 | 60.3 | 61.8 | 65.7 | 70.0 | 69.6 | 71.2 | 71.3 | 69.4 | 67.3 | 65.3 | 66.5 |
| Average dew point °F (°C) | 21.8 (−5.7) | 23.0 (−5.0) | 28.2 (−2.1) | 37.7 (3.2) | 48.4 (9.1) | 59.2 (15.1) | 64.3 (17.9) | 64.0 (17.8) | 57.7 (14.3) | 46.5 (8.1) | 37.0 (2.8) | 27.1 (−2.7) | 43.0 (6.1) |
Source: PRISM

Climate data for Sandy Hook, NJ Ocean Water Temperature (18 N Ocean Grove)
| Month | Jan | Feb | Mar | Apr | May | Jun | Jul | Aug | Sep | Oct | Nov | Dec | Year |
|---|---|---|---|---|---|---|---|---|---|---|---|---|---|
| Daily mean °F (°C) | 37 (3) | 36 (2) | 40 (4) | 46 (8) | 55 (13) | 62 (17) | 69 (21) | 72 (22) | 68 (20) | 59 (15) | 51 (11) | 43 (6) | 53 (12) |
Source: NOAA

== Ecology ==
According to the A. W. Kuchler U.S. potential natural vegetation types, Ocean Grove would have a dominant vegetation type of Appalachian Oak (104) with a dominant vegetation form of Eastern Hardwood Forest (25). The plant hardiness zone is 7a with an average annual extreme minimum air temperature of 3.8 °F (−15.7 °C). The average date of first spring leaf-out is March 24 and fall color typically peaks in early-November.

== Notable people ==
People who were born in, residents of, or otherwise closely associated with Ocean Grove include:

- Mary Porter Beegle (c. 1881–1966), dancer, theater professional and college administrator
- Perdita Buchan (born 1940), author
- Thomas Chisholm (1866–1960), Christian songwriter who wrote "Great Is Thy Faithfulness"
- Fanny Crosby (1820–1915), composer of over 8,000 hymns and gospel songs
- Michelle Davidson (born 1970), English Channel swimmer and U.S. Master Swimmer All-American
- Tali Esen Morgan (1858–1941), longtime music director at Ocean Grove
- Shep Pettibone (born 1959), record producer, remixer, songwriter and club DJ, who was most prolific in the 1980s
- Haydn Proctor (1903–1996), member of the New Jersey Senate
- Scott Rasmussen (born 1956), co-founder of ESPN and political analyst
- George A. Sheehan (1918–1993), cardiologist and running advocate
- Southside Johnny (born 1948 as John Lyon), singer songwriter
- David Spelman (born 1966), curator and music producer
- Richard R. Stout (1912–1986), politician who served in the New Jersey Senate from 1952 to 1974
- Ronald R. Thomas (1949–2023), writer, educator, and 13th president of the University of Puget Sound
- Gordon Turk (born 1949), organist and artist-in-residence of Ocean Grove's Great Auditorium since 1974

| Preceded by Asbury Park | Beaches of New Jersey | Succeeded by Bradley Beach |
