= Ulysses Kay =

American composer (1917–1995)

Ulysses Simpson Kay (January 7, 1917, in Tucson, Arizona – May 20, 1995, in Englewood, New Jersey) was an American composer. His music is mostly neoclassical in style.

== Life and career ==
Kay, the nephew of the classic jazz musician King Oliver, studied piano, violin and saxophone. He attended the University of Arizona, where he was encouraged by the African-American composer William Grant Still. He went for graduate work to the Eastman School of Music in Rochester, New York, and there worked under Howard Hanson and Bernard Rogers.

Ulysses Kay met the eminent neoclassical composer Paul Hindemith in the summer of 1941 at the Berkshire Music Center and followed Hindemith to Yale for a formative year of study from 1941 to 1942.

After a stint as a musician in the United States Navy during World War II, Kay studied at Columbia University under Otto Luening with the assistance of a grant from the Julius Rosenwald Fund. In addition to this prize, Kay received a series of five other significant awards in the year following his discharge from the Navy including the Alice M. Ditson Fellowship, a grant from the American Academy of Arts and Letters, an award from the American Composers and American Broadcasting Company, a $500 award from the third annual George Gershwin Memorial Contest for "A Short Overture," and a $700 award from the American Composers Alliance for his "Suite for Orchestra."

Following this successful period, he lived and studied further in Rome from 1949 to 1953 thanks to a Fulbright Scholarship, the Rome Prize and a Julius Rosenwald Fellowship.

Kay worked for Broadcast Music, Inc., a music performance rights organization, from 1953 to 1968. In 1968 he was appointed distinguished professor at Lehman College of the City University of New York. After two decades teaching there, he retired.

As a composer Kay was known primarily for his symphonic and choral compositions. He also wrote five operas. His final opera, Frederick Douglass, was mounted in April 1991 at the New Jersey State Opera with Kevin Maynor in the title role and Klara Barlow as Helen Pitts Douglass.

A resident of Teaneck, New Jersey, Ulysses Kay died due to complications of Parkinson's disease at the age of 78 at Englewood Hospital and Medical Center on May 20, 1995.

== Operas ==
- The Juggler of Our Lady (composed 1956, premiered 1962)
- The Boor (composed 1955, premiered 1968)
- The Capitoline Venus (composed 1969, premiered 1971)
- Jubilee (composed 1974–1976, premiered 1976)
- Frederick Douglass (composed 1979–85, premiered 1991)

== Sources ==
- Program notes by Dominique-René de Lerma for the African Heritage Symphonic Series Volume II (Cedille Records CDR 90000 061)
