= New Jersey State Opera =

Opera company in Newark, New Jersey, US

The New Jersey State Opera is an opera company based in Newark, New Jersey. It was established in 1964 as the Opera Theater of Westfield, and shortly after opening Alfredo Silipigni was hired as Artistic Director. The name was changed to the Opera Theatre of New Jersey in 1965, and in 1968 the company moved to Newark Symphony Hall. In 1974 it was renamed the New Jersey State Opera. The company moved to New Jersey Performing Arts Center (NJPAC) in 1998. In 2008, Jason C. Tramm took over as Artistic Director, serving until 2012. Tramm was a protégé of Silipigni and continued his legacy, while revitalizing the company. In 2012, it relocated to the Clifton-Passaic area.
