= Henry Please Come Home =

- M*A*S*H episode
- Episode no.: Season 1 Episode 9
- Directed by: William Wiard
- Written by: Laurence Marks
- Production code: J302
- Original air date: November 19, 1972

Guest appearances
- Odessa Cleveland; Patrick Adiarte; Timothy Brown; Bob Gooden; Jean Fleet; Noel Tey; Bill Svanoe; John Orchard; G. Wood

Episode chronology
← Previous "Cowboy"	Next → "I Hate a Mystery"
- M*A*S*H season 1

"Henry Please Come Home" is the ninth episode of the first season of the TV series M*A*S*H. It originally aired on November 19, 1972. It was written by Laurence Marks and was directed by William Wiard. Although this was the ninth episode to air, it was the second episode produced, and makes use of a deeper cast with stronger connections to the source material than episodes in the mature phase of production.

Guest cast is Odessa Cleveland as Ginger, Patrick Adiarte as Ho-Jon, Timothy Brown as Spearchucker Jones, John Orchard as Capt. 'Ugly John' Black, Bob Gooden as Boone, Bill Svanoe as Aide, Noel Toy as Mama San, Jean Fleet as Nurse, Kasuko Sakuro as Cho-Cho, and G. Wood as Brigadier Gen. Hamilton Hammond. Though the character of Gen. Hammond would continue to be mentioned in a few subsequent episodes, this episode features Hammond's final appearance on the show.

== Plot ==
Henry receives a citation for the camp achieving the best efficiency rating of any M*A*S*H unit, and then Brigadier General Hammond reassigns him to Tokyo. Frank then changes the camp to be more military, and he confiscates Hawkeye's and Trapper's still. They use forged passes to go to Tokyo to convince Henry to come back and end up pretending Radar is sick. Their ruse is revealed but Henry decides to return anyway.
