= List of awards and nominations received by Michael Mann =

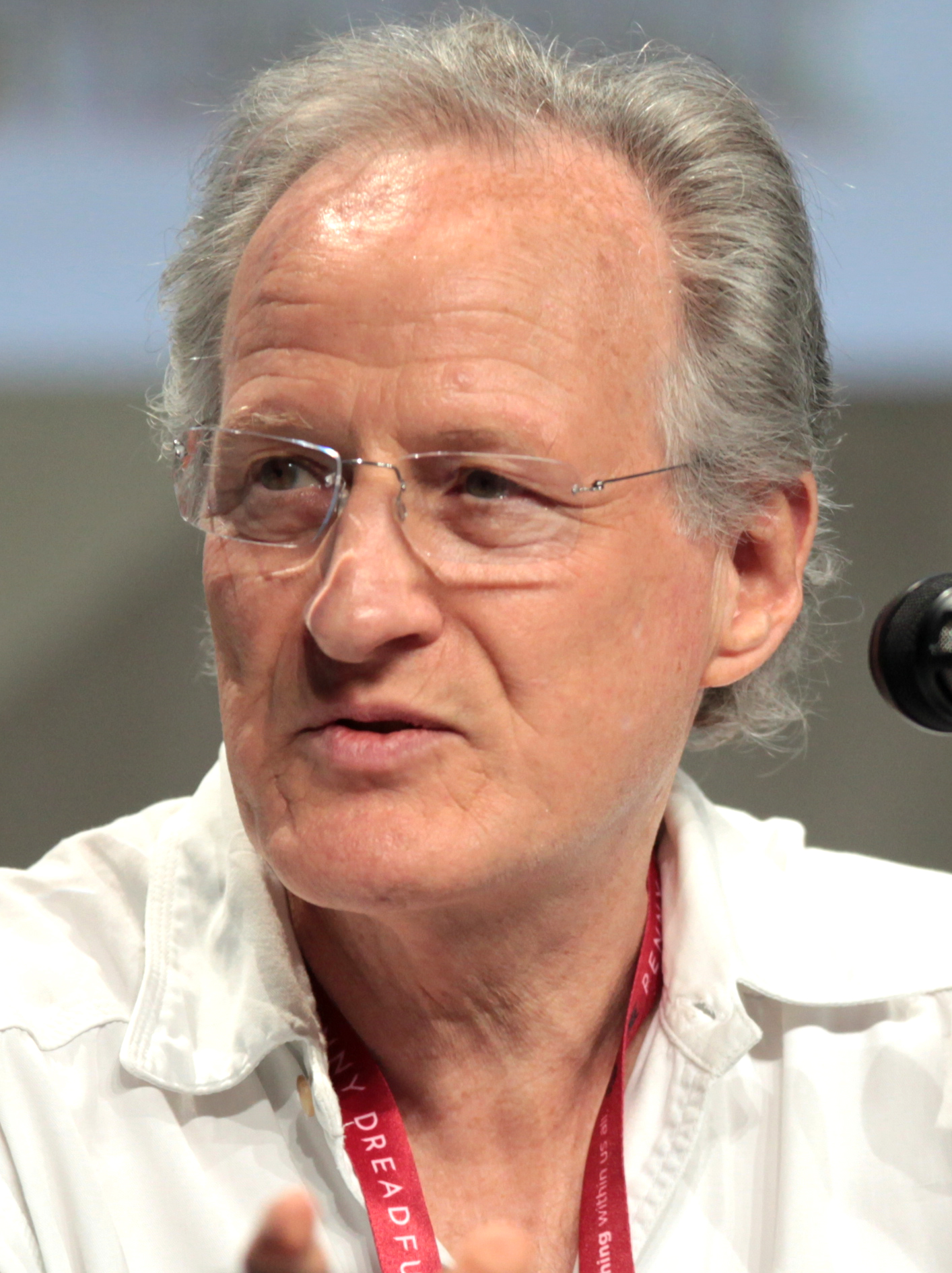
Michael Mann in 2014

Michael Mann is an American filmmaker known for his work in film and television.

He has won a British Academy Film Award for his work as a producer of Martin Scorsese's biographical epic film The Aviator (2004) and two Primetime Emmy Awards for his work on the television projects The Jericho Mile (1979) and Drug Wars: The Camarena Story (1990). He also received nominations for four Academy Awards, two Golden Globe Awards, and two Directors Guild of America Awards.

== Major awards ==
=== Academy Awards ===
Year	Category	Nominated work	Result	Ref.
2000	Best Picture	The Insider	Nominated	
2000	Best Director	The Insider	Nominated	
2000	Best Adapted Screenplay	The Insider	Nominated	
2005	Best Picture	The Aviator	Nominated	

=== BAFTA Awards ===
British Academy Film Awards
Year	Category	Nominated work	Result	Ref.
2005	Best Film	The Aviator	Won	
2005	Best Direction	Collateral	Nominated	

=== Emmy Awards ===
Primetime Emmy Awards
Year	Category	Nominated work	Result	Ref.
1979	Outstanding Writing for a Miniseries Series	The Jericho Mile	Won	
1985	Outstanding Drama Series	Miami Vice	Nominated	
1990	Outstanding Miniseries	Drug Wars: The Camarena Story	Won	
1992	Outstanding Miniseries	Drug Wars: The Cocaine Cartel	Nominated	

=== Golden Globe Awards ===
Year	Category	Nominated work	Result	Ref.
2000	Best Motion Picture - Drama	The Insider	Nominated	
2000	Best Director	The Insider	Nominated	
2000	Best Screenplay	The Insider	Nominated	

== Guild awards ==
=== Directors Guild of America Awards ===
Year	Category	Title	Result	Ref.
1980	Outstanding Directing - Specials/Movies for TV	The Jericho Mile	Won	
2000	Outstanding Directing - Feature Film	The Insider	Nominated	

=== Producers Guild of America Awards ===
Year	Category	Title	Result	Ref.
1999	Best Theatrical Motion Picture	The Insider	Nominated	
2004	Best Theatrical Motion Picture	The Aviator	Won	

=== Writers Guild of America Awards ===
Year	Category	Title	Result	Ref.
1999	Best Adapted Screenplay	The Insider	Nominated	
1999	Paul Selvin Award	The Insider	Won	

== Festival awards ==
=== Cannes Film Festival ===
Year	Category	Title	Result	Ref.
1981	Palme d'Or	Thief	Nominated	

=== Venice Film Festival ===
Year	Category	Title	Result	Ref.
2004	Future Film Festival Digital Award	Collateral	Won	
