= Cowboy (M*A*S*H) =

- M*A*S*H episode
- Episode no.: Season 1 Episode 8
- Directed by: Don Weis
- Written by: Robert Klane
- Production code: J309
- Original air date: November 12, 1972

Guest appearances
- Joe Corey; Mike Robello; Jean Powell; Timothy Brown; Billy Green Bush; John Orchard; Patrick Adiarte

Episode chronology
← Previous "Bananas, Crackers and Nuts"	Next → "Henry Please Come Home"
- M*A*S*H season 1

"Cowboy" is the eighth episode of the television series M*A*S*H. Originally shown on November 12, 1972 and repeated May 6, 1973, it was written by Robert Klane and directed by Don Weis. It is the only first-season episode listed in TV Guide as a "classic episode".

The episode's guest stars are Billy Green Bush as John "Cowboy" Hodges, Patrick Adiarte as Ho-Jon, Timothy Brown as Spearchucker Jones, Mike Robello as the cook, Jean Powell as a nurse, Joe Corey as Goldstein, and John Orchard as Capt. "Ugly John" Black.

== Plot ==
"The Cowboy", a chopper pilot whose nickname stems from his gun holster belt and cowboy hat and boots, arrives at the 4077th with a shoulder wound. He is anxiously awaiting a letter from his wife, who he fears is leaving him for another man ("She's probably off with some rodeo rider; she's a sucker for a 10-gallon hat!"). The Cowboy wants to be sent home before his marriage completely falls apart, but Henry refuses, stating that the Cowboy's wound is not serious enough to merit a discharge. Bad luck then follows Henry wherever he goes: he gets shot at while golfing, his tent gets flattened by a driverless jeep, and the latrine is blown up with him inside it. Deciding to leave camp for a while, he is nearly killed when his desk chair explodes.

The Cowboy offers to fly Henry to Seoul, then tries to push him out of the chopper in midair. At the same time, Hawkeye and Trapper realize that these "accidents" have been the Cowboy's attempts to get revenge against Henry for not sending him home. Radar brings a letter from the Cowboy's wife, and Hawkeye and Trapper inform him over the radio that it has finally arrived. The letter is postmarked Reno, Nevada, which sends the two doctors into a panic, given Reno's reputation (at the time) for quick and painless divorce proceedings. The letter also begins with "Dear John", the clichéd opening of a letter to a man whose heart is about to be broken. It turns out, however, that the Cowboy's real name is John Hodges and that he does live in Reno. In the letter, his wife explains that she had felt herself tested by temptation, but her love for him has allowed her to overcome it. The Cowboy brings Henry safely back to camp and receives a month's stateside leave.
