= Kenneth Tynan =

English theatre critic and writer (1927–1980)

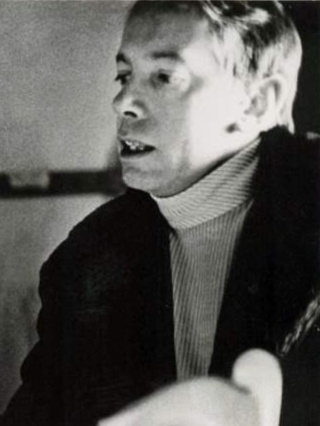
- Tynan in 1968
- Born: Kenneth Peacock Tynan; 2 April 1927; Birmingham, Warwickshire, England
- Died: 26 July 1980 (aged 53); Santa Monica, California, U.S.
- Resting place: Holywell Cemetery
- Other name: Ken Tynan
- Education: King Edward's School, Birmingham
- Alma mater: Magdalen College, Oxford
- Occupations: Theatre critic, writer
- Years active: 1952–1980
- Spouses: Elaine Dundy (m. 1951; div. 1964) Kathleen Halton (m. 1967)
- Children: 3

Kenneth Peacock Tynan (2 April 1927 – 26 July 1980) was an English theatre critic and writer. Initially making his mark as a critic at The Observer, he praised John Osborne's Look Back in Anger (1956) and encouraged the emerging wave of British theatrical talent.

In 1963, Tynan was appointed the new National Theatre Company's literary manager.

An opponent of theatre censorship, he was the first person to deliberately say the word "fuck" during a live television broadcast in 1965, although Miriam Margolyes had earlier used the expletive accidentally.

Later in life, he settled in California, where he resumed his writing career.

== Early years and education ==
Tynan was born in Birmingham, England, to Letitia Rose Tynan and (as he was led to believe) "Peter Tynan" (see below). Tynan had a stammer that was more pronounced as a child. He also possessed early on a high degree of articulate intelligence. By the age of six, he was already keeping a diary. At King Edward's School, Birmingham, he was a brilliant student of whom one of his masters said: "He was the only boy I could never teach anything." He played the lead, Doctor Parpalaid, in an English translation of Jules Romains's farce Doctor Knock. While at school, Tynan began smoking, which became a lifelong habit.

Tynan was twelve at the outbreak of the Second World War. At thirteen, he was nearly killed when a parachute landmine destroyed the houses on the other side of the Birmingham street where the Tynans lived, killing the inhabitants.

He adopted opinions then deemed outrageous. During school debates, he advocated repealing laws against homosexuality and abortion. During a school debate on the motion "This House Thinks the Present Generation Has Lost the Ability to Entertain Itself", Tynan gave a speech on the pleasures of masturbation. By the time the war ended, he had gained a scholarship to Oxford University.

=== Oxford and other experiences ===
At Magdalen College, Oxford, Tynan lived flamboyantly but was already beginning to suffer from the effects of his heavy smoking.

The writer Paul Johnson, "an awestruck freshman-witness to his arrival at the Magdalen lodge", described Tynan as a "tall, beautiful, epicene youth, with pale yellow locks, Beardsley cheekbones, fashionable stammer, plum-coloured suit, lavender tie and ruby signet-ring." According to Johnson, most students were "struck speechless" by Tynan's extravagant style.

Disliked by some, Tynan was an intellectual and social leader among Oxford undergraduates, often made a splash ("during the whole of his time there he was easily the most talked-of person in the city"), had groupies ("a court of young women and admiring dons"), and gave sensational parties sometimes attended by London entertainment celebrities, Johnson wrote.

Tynan produced and acted in plays, spoke "brilliantly" at the Oxford Union, wrote for and edited college magazines. He retained a lifelong admiration for his tutor at Oxford, C. S. Lewis; in spite of their marked differences in outlook, Tynan viewed him as a father figure.

In 1948, after the death of his father—the man he had known as Peter Tynan—Tynan learned that "Peter Tynan" was in reality an alias of Sir Peter Peacock, a former mayor of Warrington, who had been leading a double life for more than 20 years, and who had a wife and another family in Warrington. Tynan's mother was obliged to return Sir Peter's body to his wife and family in Warrington for burial. Tynan's discovery of his father's deception (and his mother's collusion) severely damaged his ability to trust others.

When Tynan was called up for National Service, he put on an act of appearing outrageously camp, including wearing a floppy hat, velvet coat, painted fingernails and a great deal of Yardley scent. Perhaps partly as a result, he was rejected as "medically unfit" for service.

== Career ==
=== 1951 to the early 1960s ===
On 25 January 1951, Tynan married the American author Elaine Dundy after a three-month romance. The following year, their daughter, Tracy (born 12 May 1952, Westminster, London), was named after the character in The Philadelphia Story, Tracy Lord, played by Katharine Hepburn. Hepburn was asked to be the child's godmother, a role she accepted.

Tynan's career took off in 1952 when he was hired as a theatre critic for the London Evening Standard. According to Johnson, Tynan "quickly established himself as the most audacious literary journalist in London. His motto was: 'Write heresy, pure heresy.' He pinned to his desk the exhilarating slogan: 'Rouse tempers, goad and lacerate, raise whirlwinds.'" Two years later, he left for The Observer, and it was there that he rose to prominence (1954–1958, 1960–1963).

Tynan was highly critical of what he called "the Loamshire play", a genre of English country house drama he felt dominated the early 1950s British stage and was wasting the talents of playwrights and actors. He espoused a new theatrical realism, best exemplified in the works of the playwrights who became known as the "Angry Young Men". There was a significant development in the 1955–56 British theatre season during which John Osborne's Look Back in Anger (and Samuel Beckett's English version of his own Waiting for Godot) premiered. Tynan championed Osborne's play, although he identified some possible flaws, concluding his review with the comment: "I doubt if I could love anyone who did not wish to see Look Back in Anger. It is the best young play of its decade." The theatre historian Dan Rebellato asserts: "it is clear that he is set on confronting his readership, not speaking for them".

"He became a power in the London theatre, which regarded him with awe, fear and hatred", Johnson wrote. The reviewer "seemed to know all world literature" and studded his articles with such words as "esurient", "cateran", "cisisbeism" [sic], and "erethism".

Tynan and the actor Harold Lang co-wrote a radio play, The Quest for Corbett (1956), which was broadcast at least twice in the BBC Third Programme in the mid-1950s. From 1956 to 1958, Tynan was the script editor for Ealing Studios, and co-wrote, with Seth Holt, the film Nowhere to Go (1958). Tynan commissioned a film adaptation of William Golding's Lord of the Flies from Nigel Kneale, but Ealing Studios closed in 1959 before it could be produced.

From 1958 to 1960, Tynan became known in the United States by contributing "some superb reviews" to The New Yorker. His marriage had become increasingly difficult in spite of his success (and Dundy's: she had published her first novel in 1958). Both had extramarital affairs (his much more blatant than hers) and he had developed a dependence on alcohol. His sexual tastes had always favoured sadomasochism, which strained the marriage as well. Dundy wrote in her memoir Life Itself (2002): "To cane a woman on her bare buttocks, to hurt and humiliate her, was what gave him his greatest sexual satisfaction." Johnson wrote that "women seem to have objected less to his sadism, which took only a mild form, than to his vanity and authoritarianism. [...] He treated women as possessions. [...] Tynan, while reserving the unqualified right to be unfaithful himself, expected loyalty from his spouse." On one occasion, he returned from a meeting with his mistress to find a naked man in the kitchen with his wife. He threw the man's clothes down a lift shaft.

After his first period writing for The New Yorker, Tynan returned in 1960 to The Observer, where he remained its theatre critic until mid-1963, when he joined the National Theatre Company.

Tynan was a supporter of the Fair Play for Cuba Committee. In 1964 Tynan joined the Who Killed Kennedy? Committee set up by Bertrand Russell.

=== At the National Theatre ===
In 1963, Laurence Olivier became the British National Theatre Company's first artistic director. Tynan had been highly dismissive of Olivier's achievements as artistic director of the Chichester Festival Theatre, which opened in 1962, but he recommended himself for the role of literary manager. Olivier was initially outraged by Tynan's presumption but Olivier's wife, Joan Plowright, convinced him that Tynan would be an asset at the National Theatre Company, then based at the Old Vic theatre. When he became the National Theatre's literary manager, Tynan ceased to be the theatre critic for The Observer, but he stayed on the paper for several more years as a film reviewer.

At the National Theatre, Tynan established for himself a global reputation, Johnson wrote: "Indeed at times in the 1960s he probably had more influence than anyone else in world theatre." Tynan in particular played an important role in the National's choice of plays, pushing Olivier into more adventurous selections than his own instincts might have led him to. Altogether, some 79 plays were performed during Tynan's period at the National Theatre; 32 were his idea, and another 20 chosen with his collaboration. Tynan also persuaded Olivier to play the title role in Shakespeare's Othello, something the actor had always been reluctant to do: Olivier's Othello opened at the National Theatre in 1964 to glowing reviews, and was filmed in 1965.

On 13 November 1965, Tynan participated in a live TV debate, broadcast as part of the BBC's late-night satirical show BBC-3. He was asked whether he would allow a play to be staged in which sexual intercourse was represented on the stage, and replied: "Well, I think so, certainly. I doubt if there are any rational people to whom the word 'fuck' would be particularly diabolical, revolting or totally forbidden. I think that anything which can be printed or said can also be seen." No recording survives of the programme. At the time, this was believed to be the first time the word "fuck" had been spoken on British television—although at least three prior claims have been asserted: Brendan Behan on Panorama in 1956 (although his drunken slurring was not understood); an anonymous man who painted the railings on Stranmillis Embankment alongside the River Lagan in Belfast, who in 1959 told Ulster TV's magazine show, Roundabout, that his job was "fucking boring"; and the actress Miriam Margolyes, who claims to have used the word in frustration while appearing on University Challenge in 1963. Johnson later called Tynan's use of the word "his masterpiece of calculated self-publicity", adding, "for a time it made him the most notorious man in the country". Private Eye joked that Tynan's stammer made it the first three-syllable four-letter word on British television.

In response to public outcry, the BBC was forced to issue a formal apology. In the House of Commons, four censuring motions were signed by a total of 133 Labour and Conservative backbenchers. Mary Whitehouse, a frequent critic of the BBC over issues of "morals and decency", wrote a letter to the Queen, suggesting that Tynan should be reprimanded by having "his bottom spanked". The irony of Whitehouse's comment has been noted, given the later revelations of Tynan's fetish for flagellation.

Tynan's use of the four-letter word appears in a song by comedian Billy Connolly entitled "Four Letter Word".

The controversy was part of a larger, longstanding aim of Tynan's "of breaking down linguistic inhibitions on the stage and in print. In 1960, "after much manoeuvring", Tynan got the four-letter word into The Observer in an article about the Lady Chatterley trial. His organisation of Oh! Calcutta! in 1969 was another important victory in that campaign. Tynan fiercely opposed censorship and was determined to break taboos he considered arbitrary.

Tynan's left-wing politics and lifestyle made him something of a poster boy for 1960s radical chic and champagne socialism in London. He suffered a serious personal defeat in the National's internal battles over his support for the Rolf Hochhuth play Soldiers, a controversial work highly critical of Winston Churchill, whose National Theatre production was eventually cancelled.

== Later career ==
An erotic revue that Tynan coordinated and partly wrote, Oh! Calcutta!, debuted in 1969 and became one of the most successful theatre hits of all time. It included scenes by various authors, including Samuel Beckett, Sam Shepard, John Lennon and Edna O'Brien, as well as music and featured frequent nudity. But Tynan was a poor businessman, and the contracts he signed for the show brought him only $250,000 out of the many millions it earned. A sequel he devised, Carte Blanche, was less successful. Germaine Greer was publicly dismissive of it. Tynan wrote in a letter to Greer that while she was entitled to her opinion, "Whether you are entitled to attend a party in celebration of the show you have just knocked, and to seek a heart-felt reconciliation with the person who devised it, I am not certain. But there is one thing to which I know you will never be entitled, and that is my friendship."

In 1971, Tynan and Roman Polanski co-wrote an unusually grim and violent screen adaptation of Macbeth. In that same year, he returned to his childhood habit of keeping a journal, detailing his last few months at the National Theatre Company, which he finally left at the end of 1973 after being outmanoeuvred by its new artistic director, Peter Hall.

In the mid-1970s, Tynan made various failed efforts to explore serious sexual themes. He researched and wrote half a book on Wilhelm Reich. His attempts to compile an anthology of masturbation fantasies foundered after being rebuffed by Vladimir Nabokov, Graham Greene, Samuel Beckett and others, and he couldn't raise enough money to finance a film about a sexual triangle. Sexual obsession and physical debility marked Tynan's last years, according to Johnson.

Throughout the decade, Tynan wrote a series of influential profiles for The New Yorker, on such subjects as Louise Brooks, Tom Stoppard, Mel Brooks, and Johnny Carson. In 1976, he moved with his family to California, in hopes of easing his emphysema. Tynan's diaries, which he continued until the end of his life, are a mixture of self-examination and gossip, frequently hilarious and passionate, filled with wisdom and occasional folly. Ultimately, they reflect a growing sense of disappointment, including the observation, "A critic is someone who knows the way, but can't drive the car."

A defender of pornography, Tynan submitted three articles on sex to Playboy, but they were all rejected for publication. He was listed at number 3 in Time Out's "Top 30 chart of London's most erotic writers" in 2008.

== Personal life ==
Tynan's first marriage deteriorated to the point where he was living apart from Dundy, and they finally divorced in May 1964. In December 1962, he had met Kathleen Halton, the daughter of wartime CBC correspondent Matthew Halton and sister of contemporary CBC journalist David Halton. Tynan convinced her to leave her husband and live with him. On 30 June 1967, before a New Jersey Justice of the Peace, Tynan married a six-months-pregnant Halton, with Marlene Dietrich as witness. During the ceremony, Dietrich backed towards some doors to close them; the judge interrupted his oration, and without change in tone or pace said: "And do you, Kenneth, take Kathleen for your lawful-wedded—I wouldn't stand with your ass to an open door in this office, lady—wife to have and to hold?"

Tynan's second marriage began falling apart, largely because of his "insistence on total sexual latitude for himself, fidelity for his wife". He formed a relationship with a woman to enact sado-masochistic fantasies, sometimes involving both of them cross-dressing, sometimes hiring prostitutes as "extras" in elaborate scenes. Tynan told his wife that he intended to continue with the sessions weekly, "although all common sense and reason and kindness and even camaraderie are against it.... It is my choice, my thing, my need ... It is fairly comic and slightly nasty. But it is shaking me like an infection and I cannot do anything but be shaken until the fit has passed."

The memoir of Tracy Tynan, his daughter from his marriage to Dundy, was published in 2016 in the United States. Wear and Tear: The Threads of My Life concerns her parents' tempestuous marriage and Tynan's later experiences of them after the couple divorced.

== Death and legacy ==
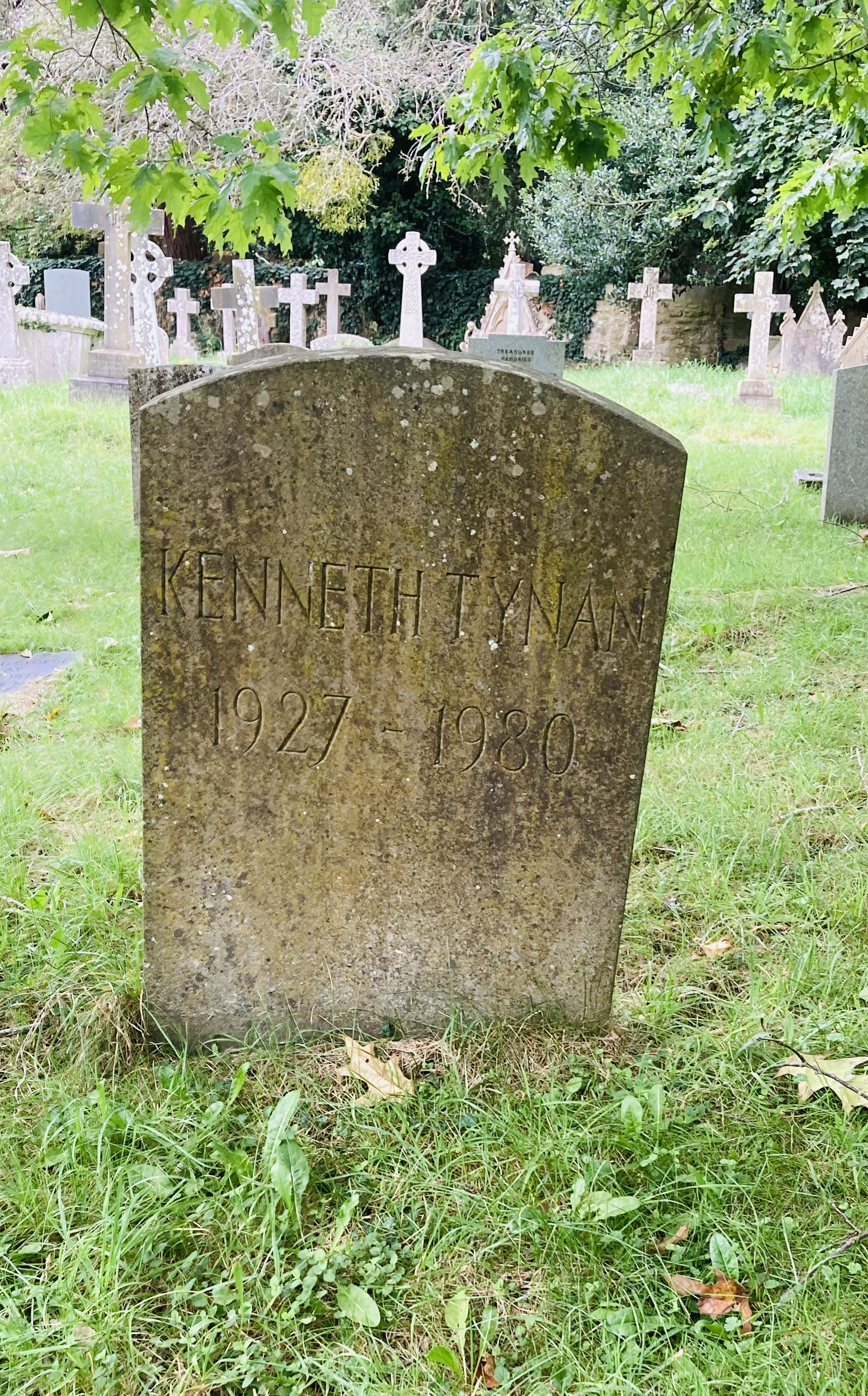
The grave of Kenneth Tynan in Holywell Cemetery in 2024

On 26 July 1980, Tynan died in Santa Monica, California, of pulmonary emphysema, aged 53. He is buried in Holywell Cemetery, Oxford.

In 1994, the British Library acquired the Tynan Archive consisting of correspondence, manuscripts, National Theatre papers, and papers relating to Oh! Calcutta!.

== Bibliography ==
=== Books ===
- He That Plays the King (1950)
- Persona Grata (photographs and dust jacket by Cecil Beaton, 1953)
- Alec Guinness (1953)
- Bull Fever (Longmans, 1955)
- Quest for Corbett (Gaberbocchus Press, 1960)
- Curtains (1961)
- Tynan Right and Left: Plays, Films, People, Places and Events (1967; ISBN 0-689-10271-2)
- The Sound of Two Hands Clapping (1975)
- Show People: Profiles in Entertainment (1980; ISBN 0-671-25012-4)
- Kathleen Tynan & Ernie Eban (ed.), Profiles (1990, Various editions; ISBN 0-06-039123-5)
- Kathleen Tynan (ed.), Kenneth Tynan: Letters (1998) (ISBN 0-517-39926-1)
- John Lahr (ed.),The Diaries of Kenneth Tynan (2001; ISBN 0-7475-5418-8, ISBN 1-58234-160-5)
- Dominic Shellard (ed.), Kenneth Tynan: Theatre Writings (2007)

As editor

- The Observer Plays (1958; London: Faber)
- A View of the English Stage (1975; London: Eyre Methuen)

=== Essays and reporting ===
- Tynan, Kenneth (29 August 2022). "The girl in the black helmet". Profiles. 11 June 1979. The New Yorker. 98 (26): 28–47. (Note: Originally published in the 11 June 1979 issue.) (Note: Online version is titled "Louise Brooks tells all".)

———————
