= David Halton =

Canadian reporter

David Halton (born Beaconsfield, Buckinghamshire, England, 1940) is a Canadian broadcast journalist. Until his retirement in June 2005, he was the senior correspondent in Washington for CBC News.

His biography Dispatches from the Front: Matthew Halton, Canada's Voice at War, was shortlisted for the 2016 RBC Taylor Prize.

== Biography ==
Halton was born in Beaconsfield, England in 1940.

His father, Matthew Halton, was a war correspondent for CBC Radio during World War II and died when David was 16 years old on December 3, 1956. The senior Halton had a big influence in David's career choice. David's sister Kathleen Tynan was the second wife and biographer of the English theatre critic Kenneth Tynan.

David Halton joined CBC in 1965, and has spent time as a foreign affairs correspondent in:

- Paris correspondent 1965-1968
- Moscow correspondent 1968-1969
- London
- Quebec
- Middle East
- Vietnam 1970s
- Ottawa 1978-1991
- Washington, D.C. 1991-2005

Before moving to Washington, Halton was the chief political correspondent in Ottawa for the CBC. He retired in June 2005.

Halton is fluent in French and Russian. He married his Russian wife, Zoya, while on assignment in Moscow.

His son Daniel used to work as a reporter for the CBC.
