= Matthew Halton =

Canadian journalist (1904–1956)

Matthew Henry Halton
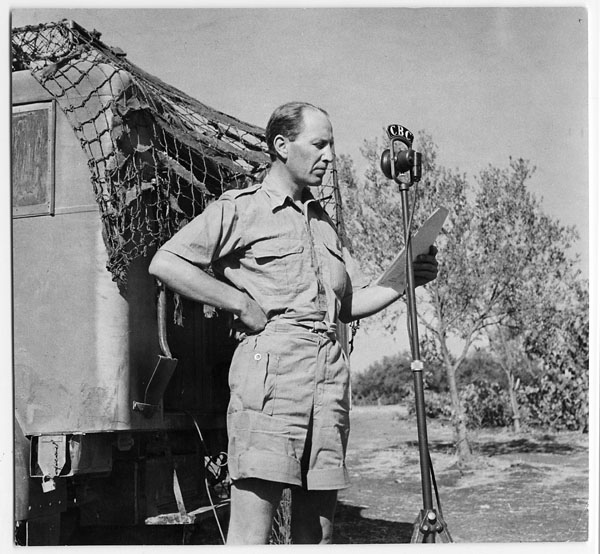
- Halton preparing to broadcast in Sicily, Italy, August 20, 1943.
- Born: September 7, 1904; Pincher Creek, Alberta, Canada
- Died: December 3, 1956 (aged 52)
- Education: University of Alberta, King's College London, London School of Economics
- Occupation: Television journalist
- Employer: Canadian Broadcasting Corporation
- Children: David Halton; Kathleen Tynan

Matthew Henry Halton (September 7, 1904 – December 3, 1956) was a Canadian television journalist, most famous as a foreign correspondent for the Canadian Broadcasting Corporation during World War II.

== Early life and education ==
Born in Pincher Creek, Alberta, Halton attended teachers college in Calgary and taught school for several years before attending the University of Alberta, where he gained experience reporting and editing for The Gateway.

He subsequently went to London, England to study at King's College London and at the London School of Economics, writing extensively on European affairs for Canadian newspapers.

== Career ==
He briefly returned to Canada in 1931, but then returned to Europe as a correspondent for the Toronto Star. He covered such issues as the rise of Nazism in Germany, the Spanish Civil War and the Winter War; with the Munich Crisis of 1938, he began filing reports for CBC Radio as well.

Halton was briefly reassigned to the Star's Washington, DC bureau in 1940, but was soon sent back to cover the North African campaign. He reported extensively for the CBC over the next two years, and then briefly returned to Canada to write and publish the memoir Ten Years to Alamein.

In 1943, he was named the CBC's senior war correspondent, returning to London and covering all aspects of the final two years of the war.

=== Post-WWII ===
After the end of World War II, he remained in Europe as the network's senior foreign correspondent, covering the Nuremberg Trials, the funeral of King George VI, the coronation of Queen Elizabeth II and the 1954 Geneva Conference, among other stories. He also filed frequent reports for the BBC as well.

== Personal life ==
Halton's son David later became CBC Television's chief political correspondent. His daughter Kathleen married influential British theatre critic Kenneth Tynan, and later established her own career as a writer.

== Later life and death ==
In 1956, Halton received an honorary doctorate from the University of Alberta. He died several months later, following stomach surgery.

== Legacy ==
Matthew Halton High School in Halton's home town of Pincher Creek, Alberta is named after him.

== Archives ==
The Matthew Halton collection is held by Library and Archives Canada, under archival reference number R10120. It consists of 2.25 metres of textual records, 174 photographs, 15 audio cassettes, and 2 maps. The description includes a finding aid.
