= Agatha (film) =

1979 film

- Theatrical release poster
- Directed by: Michael Apted
- Written by: Kathleen Tynan; Arthur Hopcraft
- Produced by: Jarvis Astaire; Gavrik Losey
- Starring: Dustin Hoffman; Vanessa Redgrave; Timothy Dalton
- Cinematography: Vittorio Storaro
- Edited by: Jim Clark
- Music by: Johnny Mandel
- Production companies: Casablanca FilmWorks; First Artists
- Distributed by: Warner Bros. (through Columbia-EMI-Warner Distributors)
- Release date: 9 February 1979
- Running time: 98 minutes
- Country: United Kingdom
- Language: English
- Budget: $3.5 million
- Box office: $7.5 million

Agatha is a 1979 British drama thriller film directed by Michael Apted and starring Vanessa Redgrave, Dustin Hoffman and Timothy Dalton. It was written by Kathleen Tynan. The film focuses on renowned crime writer Agatha Christie's famous 11-day disappearance in 1926. The film was released 9 February 1979, receiving generally positive reviews from critics, who praised the production values and performances.

At the 52nd Academy Awards for films from 1979, it received a nomination for Best Costume Design for Shirley Russell. The award, however, went to Albert Wolsky for All That Jazz.

== Plot ==
The film opens as Agatha Christie gets a silver cup engraved for her husband Archie, who receives the gift with utter disdain. The couple walk to a publicity event for Agatha's new novel, The Murder of Roger Ackroyd. They are tailed into the venue by American reporter Wally Stanton. The next morning, Archie demands a divorce, saying he loves his secretary, Nancy Neele.

That night, Agatha drives from the house and gets into an accident. The next morning, the police find her wrecked car. The press flock to the accident scene and learn that Christie left a letter for her secretary, prompting speculation of suicide.

Agatha arrives by train in Harrogate and takes a cab to the Harrogate Hydropathic Hotel (now renamed the Old Swan Hotel), where she books a room for two weeks. She registers as Theresa Neele from Cape Town. In the lounge, another guest, Evelyn Crawley, notices Agatha's ripped stockings and muddy shoes. Agatha makes a note later to "use" Crawley.

The next day, Agatha begins receiving treatments at the Royal Baths. Meanwhile, the newspapers are publishing front-page stories about Agatha's disappearance. The police wonder why Archie is not helping with the search for his wife, but he has gone to Harrogate with Nancy for her slimming treatments. Meanwhile, Stanton interviews Agatha's secretary. She reveals that Agatha left her a coded message in newspaper advertisements.

The ad leads Stanton to the hotel in Harrogate. He makes a big show of checking in while Agatha is on the phone at the front desk. In the billiard room, Stanton helps Agatha make a winning triple bank shot. He introduces himself as Curtis Shacks Jr., an American seeking treatment for constipation. They spend the evening together, and he makes a pass at her, which she declines. In his room, he types notes about her behaviour.

Agatha researches the various spa treatments, such as the galvanic bath and the Bergonic chair. She asks the attendants to explain how they avoid making a fatal mistake with the equipment. Stanton follows Agatha to a local electronics shop and begins to work out what she is up to. Agatha peruses a manual for the Bergonic chair and begins to experiment with the rheostat. She also poses as a staff member on the phone and reschedules Nancy's appointment for an earlier time.

Agatha is shown rigging the controls for the Bergonic chair as Nancy undresses for her appointment. When Nancy enters the treatment room, Agatha calls out from hiding to say that the nurse is not there. She asks Nancy to turn on the electricity. Having deduced Agatha's plan, Stanton is urgently searching for the room where Nancy's appointment is. Nancy flips the switch, causing a massive spark. Stanton follows the sound of Nancy's scream to find her all right, but that behind a curtain, Agatha is sitting in the Bergonic chair. Her suicide attempt is nearly successful, but Stanton rescues her with CPR.

The Christies claim that Agatha suffered from amnesia from the accident and remembers nothing. Agatha visits Stanton as he packs in his hotel room. He hands her a copy of the story he wrote, confessing that he cannot file it. Agatha stoops to help him pack, and Stanton confesses his love for her. She explains that she will divorce Archie, hinting at a possible future with Stanton. He watches the Christies depart at the railway station. The closing credits reveal that the couple divorced two years later, and that Archie married Nancy.

== Cast ==
- Vanessa Redgrave as Agatha Christie
- Dustin Hoffman as Wally Stanton
- Timothy Dalton as Archie Christie
- Helen Morse as Evelyn Crawley
- Celia Gregory as Nancy Neele
- Paul Brooke as John Foster
- Carolyn Pickles as Charlotte Fisher
- Timothy West as Kenward
- Tony Britton as William Collins
- Alan Badel as Lord Brackenbury
- Robert Longden as Pettelson
- Donald Nithsdale as Uncle Jones
- Yvonne Gilan as Mrs. Braithwaite
- Sandra Voe as Therapist
- Barry Hart as Supt. MacDonald
- David Hargreaves as Sgt. Jarvis
- Tim Seely as Capt. Rankin
- Jill Summers as Nancy's Aunt
- Chris Fairbank as Luland
- Liz Smith as Flora
- Peter Arne as Hotel Manager

== Production ==
Kathleen Tynan began researching the project as a BBC documentary. During her research, she told producer David Puttnam about it, and he suggested it be turned into a feature film. The Agatha Christie estate opposed the film, and tried to get it stopped. Finance was going to be provided by the Rank Organisation but they pulled out.

Filming commenced 7 November 1977 in Harrogate, in North Yorkshire, England. Bray Studios in Berkshire were also used. Several members of the cast were upset with script changes made once production had begun. Hoffman also clashed with First Artists over Straight Time. On both films, the company took control away from Hoffman in the name of keeping the projects on schedule and under budget. Hoffman sued. The lawsuit was finally settled in 1984 with Hoffman receiving $1 million.

The locomotive pulling the train is LNER A3 Class 4-6-2 No. 4472 Flying Scotsman, disguised as sister locomotives no. 4474 Victor Wild on one side and 4480 Enterprise on the other side. Flying Scotsman is now preserved at the National Railway Museum in York, and operates tourist and excursion trains on the mainline.

== Reception ==
Roger Ebert of the Chicago Sun-Times gave the film two-and-a-half stars out of four, and told readers that the relationship between Christie and the American journalist "isn't real. It's never for a moment deeply felt — it's just deeply acted."

Vincent Canby of The New York Times called the film "a handsome, rudderless sort of movie that isn't quite a mystery story, not quite a love story and certainly not a biography. 'Agatha,' like most speculation on minor matters, would be immediately forgettable if it weren't for the resourcefulness of the two stars."

Variety called the film "an engaging and stylish film mystery. The film lives up to the legacy of its subject matter, author Agatha Christie, in every respect."

Gene Siskel of the Chicago Tribune awarded three-and-a-half stars out of four, and wrote that "the film's principal pleasure is watching two of our finest actors disappear into their characters. Redgrave is flawless. Her Christie is a high-strung, bright, old-worldly, beautiful, fragile national treasure ... Hoffman, an acting chameleon to rival Laurence Olivier, is perfect as an American dandy."

Kevin Thomas of the Los Angeles Times called the film "an impeccable period piece" and "a delight throughout", marred only by a song over the closing credits "of thudding inappropriateness".

Pauline Kael of The New Yorker wrote that "Vanessa Redgrave endows Agatha Christie with the oddness of genius", but the filmmakers "haven't come up with enough for their sorrowful, swanlike lady to do".

Gary Arnold of The Washington Post stated, "A beautiful production and several adept performers, notably Dustin Hoffman in one of the most winning portrayals of his career, make 'Agatha' a surprisingly glamorous, intoxicating entertainment."

Geoff Brown of The Monthly Film Bulletin wrote, "The screenplay makes it clear that our heroine was very unhappy and repressed when she disappeared for eleven days in 1926; Vanessa Redgrave makes it clear too, with an abundance of beady, pained looks. But there is still insufficient weight to the character, and Dustin Hoffman's reporter, who falls in love on the job in the old Hollywood tradition, proves even wispier."

On Rotten Tomatoes, the film scored 67% based on 15 reviews.
