= First Artists =

Defunct film production company

- Trade name: First Artists Production Company
- Type: Film production
- Industry: Film
- Founded: 1969 in Hollywood, Los Angeles, California, United States
- Founders: Paul Newman; Barbra Streisand; Sidney Poitier
- Defunct: March 1980; 46 years ago
- Fate: Defunct; sold to Warner Bros. Pictures
- Headquarters: Beverly Hills, California, United States
- Key people: Freddie Fields, David Begelman, Dustin Hoffman, Steve McQueen, Phil Feldman
- Products: Motion pictures

First Artists was a production company that operated from 1969 to 1980. Designed to give movie stars more creative control over their productions, the initial actors who formed First Artists were Paul Newman, Barbra Streisand, and Sidney Poitier; later joined by Steve McQueen and Dustin Hoffman. Movies made by First Artists include McQueen's The Getaway and the company's most successful film, Streisand's A Star Is Born.

== History ==
=== Beginnings ===
The company was formed in 1969 and was the idea of agent Freddie Fields of Creative Management Associates with assistance from his partner David Begelman. Inspired by the formation of United Artists, Newman, Streisand, and Poitier formed First Artists with the understanding that they would have more creative control over their productions in exchange for being paid lower salaries and a share of the profits. Each star promised to make three productions for the company, which would also be involved in television production, music publishing, and recording. The distributor of the films would be National General Pictures, which would put up two-thirds of the money for a film, with First Artists putting up the rest.

In July 1970, Patrick Kelly was appointed chief executive officer of First Artists. The following year Steve McQueen joined the company. The company's first slate of films were Pocket Money (1972) with Newman, The Getaway (1972) with McQueen, The Life and Times of Judge Roy Bean (1972) with Newman, and Up the Sandbox (1972) with Streisand. The Getaway and Roy Bean were particularly successful.

In 1972, First Artists offered 350,000 shares to investors at $7.50. That year Dustin Hoffman joined the company, agreeing to make two films at no more than $3 million. He would have creative control, provided the film did not go over budget and schedule.

Meanwhile, First Artists' distributor National General Pictures went into liquidation. In November 1973, Warner Bros. took over the distribution of First Artists movies. First Artists sued National General, settling in 1976.

=== Phil Feldman ===
The company's initial output was sporadic, owing to the commitments of its stars, and by January 1975 it had only made seven films. That month, Philip K. Feldman, formerly a producer and an executive at CBS, Rastar, and Warner Bros., was brought in as chairman. He increased the development slate, and moved First Artists into film distribution, television, and music to ensure a more constant source of income.

Feldman decided to supplement the company's movies with other stars' films, such as Bobby Deerfield, originally developed for Paul Newman, and made with Al Pacino at Columbia. First Artists became involved in the production of The Gumball Rally, was a distribution consultant on The Ritz, and did TV movies like Minstrel Man.

In July 1977, Feldman announced that Bill Cosby, who had appeared in three Poitier films, would produce and star in a film for the company called Sitting Pretty. "I consider him a member of the team," said Feldman of Cosby. Other films the company planned to make included Repo, with Darren McGavin, Stevie with Glenda Jackson, and Devilfish with Bert Gordon. (Devilfish and Sitting Pretty would ultimately not be made.) First Artists shared development costs on Bobby Deerfield, The Gauntlet, and The One and Only; and co-produced Speedtrap with a Dutch conglomerate. The company also distributed some foreign films in the US, such as Pardon Mon Affaire and That Obscure Object of Desire.

In 1976, McQueen made An Enemy of the People, which tested so poorly that it was never officially released. When First Artists refused to option Harold Pinter's Old Times for McQueen, the actor sued the company. The case was settled out of court.

Feldman insisted that Hoffman not make pictures for other studios until his obligation to First Artists was completed. Hoffman wound up suing First Artists for $65 million, claiming that he was denied creative control on Straight Time and Agatha. Feldman counter-claimed that these movies had gone over budget and schedule, allowing him to step in.

In July 1978, the company acquired Joel/Cal-Made, a male clothing manufacturer, for $8 million. In November, the company sought to buy into a London casino but was unsuccessful.

=== End of the company ===
Films such as Straight Time (Hoffman, 1978) and Agatha (Hoffman, 1979) performed poorly at the box office, although The Main Event (Streisand, 1979) was very successful. In September 1979, Philip Feldman resigned as chairman and president. The company was put up for sale.

On December 31, 1979, the voting trust that ran First Artists on behalf of its founder – shareholders expired and First Artists left the movie business. By this stage, the company's shares were worth $4 apiece. The company's last film was Tom Horn. The company closed down a year later in March 1980 and was sold to Warner Bros.

== Select filmography ==
=== National General Pictures ===
- Pocket Money (February 1972) — with Newman
- The Getaway (December 1972) — with McQueen
- The Life and Times of Judge Roy Bean (December 1972) — with Newman
- Up the Sandbox (December 1972) — with Streisand
- A Warm December (May 1973) — with Poitier

=== Warner Bros. ===
- Uptown Saturday Night (June 1974) — with Poitier
- The Drowning Pool (July 1975) — with Newman
- Let's Do It Again (October 1975) — with Poitier
- The Gumball Rally (August 1976)
- A Star Is Born (December 1976) — with Streisand
- Bobby Deerfield (September 1977)
- A Piece of the Action (October 1977) — with Poitier
- Straight Time (March 1978) — with Hoffman
- An Enemy of the People (March 1978) — with McQueen
- Agatha (February 1979) — with Hoffman
- The Main Event (June 1979) — with Streisand
- Tom Horn (March 1980) — with McQueen

=== TV Movies ===
- Flight to Holocaust (1977) (TV film)
- Minstrel Man (1977) (TV film)
- The Paul Williams Show (1979) (TV special)

=== First Artists distributed ===
- Speedtrap (1977)
- Snatch (1978)
- Stevie (1978)
- Zero to Sixty (1978)

== Distributor only ==
- Pardon Mon Affaire
- That Obscure Object of Desire

== Unmade projects ==
- Dry Hustle — from novel by Sarah Kernochan (1977)
- Fancy Hardware — by script by A. J. Carothers (1977)
- Ev'ry Time We Say Goodbye — based on the song by Cole Porter (1977)
- Tramps — original script by Sandor Stern (1977)
- Flashpoint — based on novel by George LaFountaine; eventually produced by HBO Pictures in 1984
