= An Enemy of the People (1978 film) =

1978 film directed by George Schaefer

- Theatrical release poster
- Directed by: George Schaefer
- Written by: Alexander Jacobs
- Based on: An Enemy of the People; 1882 play by Henrik Ibsen; 1950 adaptation by Arthur Miller
- Produced by: George Schaefer
- Starring: Steve McQueen; Charles Durning; Bibi Andersson
- Cinematography: Paul Lohmann
- Edited by: Sheldon Kahn
- Music by: Leonard Rosenman
- Production company: First Artists
- Distributed by: Warner Bros.
- Release date: March 17, 1978
- Running time: 103 minutes
- Country: United States
- Language: English
- Budget: $2.5 million

An Enemy of the People is a 1978 American drama film directed by George Schaefer and based on Arthur Miller's 1950 adaptation of Henrik Ibsen's 1882 play. The film stars Steve McQueen in the lead role of scientist Thomas Stockmann, Charles Durning as his brother Peter, and Bibi Andersson as his wife Catherine.

== Plot ==
Thomas Stockmann is a doctor and amateur scientist in a small, unnamed Norwegian town. The town is expecting a major boost in tourism due to the therapeutic powers of nearby springs, but Stockmann has discovered they are being polluted by waste from the town's tannery and will cause severe health problems. He writes an article for the local newspaper, the Messenger, exposing the contamination, but the staff is intimidated into stopping its publication by Stockmann's brother Peter, the town mayor. Peter offers a compromise: he will use the springs' revenue to implement the changes his brother wants if Thomas will keep quiet. But the doctor refuses on the grounds that he will not be silenced merely for speaking an unpopular truth.

Thomas calls a public meeting to make his case, but his strong personality, combined with his brother organizing hecklers to shout at and mock him, result in the townspeople viewing him as a self-important buffoon who cares nothing for the town's welfare. The once well-respected Stockmann family become pariahs: Thomas is blacklisted from further employment in town, his daughter Petra loses her job as a teacher, and rocks are thrown through the windows of their home. Thomas' family members remain loyal to him, however, and decide against Peter's recommendation that they immigrate to America. Instead, they decide to stay and wait for Thomas' discovery to be proven in time. As they celebrate their decision, a fresh hail of stones comes through the windows.

== Cast ==
- Steve McQueen as Thomas Stockmann
- Charles Durning as Peter Stockmann
- Bibi Andersson as Catherine Stockmann
- Eric Christmas as Morten Kiil
- Michael Cristofer as Hovstad
- Richard Dysart as Aslaksen
- Michael Higgins as Billing
- Richard Bradford as Capt. Forster
- Ham Larsen as Morton Stockmann
- John Levin as Ejlif Stockmann
- Robin Pearson Rose as Petra Stockmann

== Production ==
After working on The Towering Inferno, McQueen was one of the highest-earning film stars in the world. Nevertheless, he was absent from films for four years. Although he received several offers during this period, he had high wage demands, and insisted that his wife Ali MacGraw work with him. Among the projects that failed to materialize for the pair during this period were Deajum's Wife with producer Elliott Kastner, The Johnson County War with director Michael Winner (eventually made as Heaven's Gate by Michael Cimino) and The Betsy alongside Laurence Olivier. He also vetoed MacGraw taking part in Heaven Can Wait, and either turned down or priced himself out of roles in A Bridge Too Far and Apocalypse Now (McQueen was offered the role of Captain Willard with a $1.5 million salary, but then demanded $3 million for the smaller role of Colonel Kurtz). Bored with inactivity, but unwilling to lower his demands for mainstream work, McQueen took an unbilled role as a stunt rider in the B movie Dixie Dynamite for $175 per week.

During this period, McQueen became interested in Miller's adaptation of Ibsen's play, seeing it as an opportunity to challenge his tough-guy, action-film persona and gain more plaudits for his acting abilities by returning to his classical acting roots. He used his own Solar Productions company for the film through First Artists, and was credited as executive producer, taking a much smaller salary to get the studio and distributor Warner Bros. Pictures interested.

According to an anonymous source at the time:

At first we thought it was a joke. It was as if John Barrymore, at the height of his career, had decided to play Tarzan. Everybody knows that Steve doesn't like to say a lot of lines; an Ibsen play is nothing but dialogue. We thought he was trying to force First Artists to let him out of his contract with them.

According to his then-wife Ali MacGraw:

He didn't want to do another shoot-'em-up. Steve is a combination of all the things he wants the world to think he is - macho, tough, and insensitive. But he is also the most sensitive man I know. He began to read: Chekov, Strindberg, Gogol, tons of people. An Enemy of the People touched him.

McQueen approached Schaefer to direct in May 1976. The director said, "All I knew about him was the character up there on screen riding motorcycles, but Steve is serious. There comes a point in life when you don't want to play young buckos anymore. I said the picture couldn't be designed to protect a weak performance by him. He said he absolutely agreed."

=== Casting ===
Initially, McQueen intended for MacGraw to play the part of Catherine Stockmann, but the couple's relationship had deteriorated. In 1978, MacGraw left McQueen to work with Sam Peckinpah on Convoy, her first film since The Getaway. Ultimately, Swedish actress Bibi Andersson was cast for the part. Nicol Williamson was initially cast as Peter Stockmann, but was fired by McQueen and Schaefer after he failed to show up for rehearsals after spending a drunken week in Hawaii. Charles Durning was brought in as replacement.

=== Filming ===
Filming began August 30, 1976, after three weeks of rehearsal. Charles Durning later recalled, "After the first week of rehearsal, [McQueen] thought he was ready to begin shooting. He wasn't, and after the second week of rehearsal, he knew he wasn't. His performance grew tremendously during those three weeks."

McQueen threw himself into the film, going as far as to base his own makeup on photographs from a 1902 Swedish stage production of the play, personally overseeing the construction of the sets, and adhering to the play's long climactic speech, although it went against the taciturn style that had been his trademark. The film was originally budgeted for $2.5 million but overran to $3 million.

== Release ==
An Enemy of the People was made in 1976 and was ready to be shown in early 1977, but in the end, had only a very limited theatrical release.

The Warner Bros. studio was at a loss as to how to promote the film, as the wordy period film was not what was expected from an established action star — McQueen was nearly unrecognizable in the role with a beard and long hair. The poster issued to promote the film surrounded the image of McQueen, as Stockmann, with artwork from his better-known previous roles, including "Doc" McCoy from The Getaway, Jake Holman from The Sand Pebbles, and Frank Bullitt from Bullitt. A lobbycard was also issued featuring no images from the film, instead using positive reviews from test screenings.

The film sat on the shelf for a year before it was given a tentative release in college towns in March 1978; it performed poorly and was quickly withdrawn. It was shown at the Montreal World Film Festival in August 1978. McQueen promoted the movie with an hour lecture at UCLA titled "The Genius of Ibsen", but the slated October 1978 national release was canceled.

On June 11, 1980, however, the film had an accidental premiere at two drive-in theaters owned by the Essaness chain: the Hammond Twin drive-in in Hammond, Indiana, and the I-80 drive-in in Tinley Park, Illinois, at 10:45 p.m. Central Daylight Time, preceding the Clint Eastwood comedy, Bronco Billy. A Chicago-area representative for Warner Bros. lamented the situation, stating:

It was a mistake. The theaters needed a film to fill out their programs, and one of our bookers looked on her sheet and gave them An Enemy of the People. It shouldn't have happened. Originally we tried to put together a few theaters for a wide release of the picture, but so far no theaters have shown any interest. Lately, we would have been willing to give it to an art house for a couple of weeks, but still no takers. Still, this wasn't the proper way to release the picture.

McQueen moved back to more familiar territory for his next (and, ultimately, final) two films, the Western, Tom Horn, and the action movie, The Hunter.

Even after its short cinema run, An Enemy of the People film remained highly obscure, not being released on home media until 2009, when Warner Bros. issued it on DVD through its made-on-demand digital distribution arm.

== Reception ==
Due to its extremely limited release, An Enemy of the People was featured in few contemporary reviews. In a negative review, Nigel Andrews of the Financial Times wrote, "McQueen manages at once to look totally out of place and to give the best performance in the film. Most of his fellow actors seem dead behind the eyes."

In a similar vein, Gene Siskel of the Chicago Tribune wrote, "McQueen is not bad in the film. Even shrouded in a beard and granny glasses, his piercing blue eyes speak with a passion equal to Ibsen's words. The main problem is the physical look of the film and its lumpy direction by George Schaefer. The film has the hollow feel of an amateur play on TV. Schaefer has the odd habit of ending too many scenes with cute remarks."

Poll. in Variety said that "director George Schaefer does his best to eliminate the usual dull blocking of filmed plays, but he's hamstrung by the obvious miscasting of McQueen...The imbalance wouldn't be so pronounced were Charles Durning not so magnificent in the role of the harshly realistic brother. Without an adequate presence to balance Durning's domination of the proceedings, "Enemy" founders in a sea of verbiage." He also felt that the script had a "preachiness" and was "condescending to its audience."

Stanley Kauffmann of The New Republic wrote that he did not care much for it, and found the performances by Durning and McQueen to be lacking.

Janet Maslin of The New York Times, writing about the film in 1981, after McQueen had died, was equally unsparing:

Here is an atypical, not very successful performance by an actor who was never less than interesting, even when his work was as misguided as it is here. An Enemy of the People ... isn't dreadful, but there have probably been high-school productions of the play that were just as competent. Still, Mr. McQueen's presence lends the movie a certain fascination. Even his appearance, which is uncharacteristically hirsute and blank, helps make the film more of a curiosity than a failure....

Like most of the cast, ... Mr. McQueen is very American here, and very uncomfortable with his dialogue. The screenplay, by Alexander Jacobs, relies heavily on Arthur Miller's adaptation of the play, but in all cases except Miss Andersson's, the readings are so stilted that they rob the play of emotion. It's impossible to watch the film without feeling that a game of dress-up is going on....

There's not much spark to An Enemy of the People, but it never sounds a desperately wrong note, either. It wouldn't have been surprising to find a movie star of Mr. McQueen's stature experimenting quietly with such prestigious but unlikely material in a workshop production on the stage somewhere. On the screen, the effort is just as frail and uncertain, but perhaps more unexpected.
