= Up the Sandbox =

1972 film by Irvin Kershner

- VHS cover artwork, circa. 1980s
- Directed by: Irvin Kershner
- Screenplay by: Paul Zindel
- Based on: Up the Sandbox by Anne Roiphe
- Produced by: Robert Chartoff; Irwin Winkler
- Starring: Barbra Streisand; David Selby
- Cinematography: Gordon Willis
- Edited by: Robert Lawrence
- Music by: Billy Goldenberg
- Production companies: Barwood Films; First Artists
- Distributed by: National General Pictures
- Release date: December 21, 1972
- Running time: 97 minutes
- Country: United States
- Language: English
- Budget: $2,926,000
- Box office: $3,500,000 (rentals)

Up the Sandbox is a 1972 American comedy-drama film directed by Irvin Kershner, with a screenplay by Paul Zindel, based on the novel of the same name by Anne Roiphe. The film stars Barbra Streisand as Margaret Reynolds, a young wife and mother in Manhattan, who slips into increasingly bizarre fantasies to escape the predicament of her pregnancy. The film's supporting cast includes David Selby, Paul Benedict, George S. Irving, Conrad Bain, Isabel Sanford, Lois Smith and Jacobo Morales as a character who closely resembles Fidel Castro.

The film deals with themes related to feminism and the sexual revolution. Filming took place in Morningside Heights, California, and Samburu National Reserve in Kenya in 1972. It was Streisand's first picture that she made with First Artists, a production company formed by Streisand, Paul Newman and Sidney Poitier. The film was released on December 21, 1972, by National General Pictures. Although it was a critical success, it was a box office flop.

== Plot ==
Margaret Reynolds is a young wife and mother of two living on the Upper West Side of Manhattan with her husband, Paul, a Columbia University history professor. Margaret is bored with her bourgeois day-to-day life and neglected by Paul, who is consumed by his work. She soon discovers that she is pregnant again and initially does not tell her husband, and instead finds refuge in her outrageous fantasies: being sexually pursued by a Central American dictator modeled on Fidel Castro, imagining confrontations with her husband and mother, going on an anthropological visit to an African tribe that promises a ritual of pain-free childbirth, and being involved in a terrorist mission to plant explosives in the Statue of Liberty. After one final fantasy of visiting and then fleeing an abortion clinic, Margaret finally tells Paul about the pregnancy and then leaves in a taxi to enjoy a day without parenting responsibilities.

== Cast ==
- Barbra Streisand as Margaret Reynolds
- David Selby as Paul Reynolds
- Ariane Heller as Elizabeth Reynolds
- Jane Hoffman as Mrs. Koerner
- John C. Becher as Mr. Koerner
- Jacobo Morales as Fidel Castro
- Paul Benedict as Dr. Beineke
- George S. Irving as Dr. Keglin
- Conrad Bain as Dr. Gordon
- Isabel Sanford as Maria
- Paul Dooley as Statue of Liberty Guard
- Anne Ramsey as Battleaxe
- Lois Smith as Elinore
- Lee Chamberlin as Jan
- Jennifer Darling as Joanne
- Marilyn Coleman as Rose White
- Stockard Channing (uncredited) as Judy Stanley

== Production ==
Producer Irwin Winkler purchased the film rights to Anne Roiphe’s novel for $60,000, beating director Robert Altman, who confessed in 1972, “I wanted to do Up the Sandbox. But I wasn’t able to get it.”

Director Irvin Kershner reportedly told Barbra Streisand's biographer James Spada that he was originally unhappy with the script and that he was advised not to express his dissatisfaction to Streisand. Several days into filming, when Streisand went to Kershner and asked him why they were having so much trouble, he told her that they had started shooting with a weak script. Kershner said "Your people warned me not to tell you." Streisand said "That's ridiculous! If a script isn't good enough, let's work to improve it."

Kershner originally planned to shoot on a backlot at MGM. When Streisand convinced him it would be better for the film to shoot some scenes on location in East Africa, he agreed and then convinced producers Robert Chartoff and Irwin Winkler. Kershner used Samburu tribesmen as extras, portraying the fabled Masai tribe.

Streisand remembered Kenya as "quite beautiful...I remember it being so hot. We had no air conditioner or anything, so I had a little, dinky trailer filled with flies. Flies everywhere. But I loved the people, the Samburu people, and I made very good friends with a woman of the tribe. We didn’t speak the same language, obviously, but she understood what I was trying to say to her. She showed me how to dress. Everything was held together with safety pins so nobody had to sew anything. I had the greatest outfits. You rip the fabric and you safety pin in where you want it. And then jewelry made out of telephone wires, little beads. She taught me how they put makeup on their eyes with the ground stone, blue..."

Streisand filmed a kiss with a black revolutionary in the scene at the Statue of Liberty, however the studio ordered the footage cut from the final film, due to social attitudes at the time.

Kershner's hopes of working with Streisand again were stymied when she rejected the title role in Eyes of Laura Mars; Faye Dunaway eventually took the part.

== Release ==
=== Critical reception ===
Up the Sandbox was one of the early films to explore women's changing roles during the sexual revolution of the early 1970s, and critics praised Streisand's performance. According to Pauline Kael in The New Yorker, Streisand "never seemed so radiant as in this joyful mess, taken from the Anne Richardson Roiphe novel and directed by Irvin Kershner. The picture is full of knockabout urban humor". Kael continued: "Barbra Streisand has never seemed so mysteriously, sensually fresh, so multi-radiant. As Margaret, wife of a Columbia instructor and mother-of-two, she's a complete reason for going to a movie, as Garbo was. If there is such a thing as total empathy, she has it."

Roger Ebert, who gave the film three out of four stars, only had praise for her in his review: "This is a Barbra Streisand movie, and so we know the central character won't (can't) be stereotyped; nothing even remotely like Streisand has existed in movies before...She does not give us a liberated woman, or even a woman working in some organized way toward liberation. Instead, she gives us a woman who feels free to be herself, no matter what anyone thinks. This is a kind of woman, come to think of it, who is rare in American movies".

Gary Arnold of The Washington Post wrote "Up the Sandbox is something rather special, a smart, imaginative, unconventional comedy about middle class married and domestic life that also is extraordinarily touching, truly loving. This is by several light years the most endearing and fundamentally joyous new movie the holiday season has to offer."

Howard Thompson praised the film in a review published by The New York Times: "Barbra Streisand's sixth film is her sixth hit...it's hard not to think of this extraordinary young woman, perfectly wedded to the camera with her instant Modigliani face and timing. She's the picture, true, but the teamwork is admirable. Nearly everything works and meshes, starting with an adroit script by Paul Zindel...Fortunately and even when they're way out, the vignette musings generally miss blandness and strain because our heroine is a bright, likable girl, not a pinhead. Furthermore, Irvin Kershner has paced the picture—in which Miss Streisand plays a non-singing role — with a kind of take-it-or-leave-it verve that nimbly enhances the sharp dialogue, the more thoughtful passages and the performances."

Rosalyn Drexler also wrote a review for The New York Times, criticizing the politics but praising the direction and performances: "Now, although Up the Sandbox purports to examine Margaret's changing role in relation to her husband, children, political reality, racial problems—anything and everything that touches upon herself and the rest of the world—it becomes a clumsy reaffirmation of the notion that staying at home and having babies is the best thing for a woman to do, especially if her husband “generously” likes babies and is willing to give her one day a week off...However, politics aside, Irvin Kershner, the director, is often really excellent: I loved his direction of a family get‐together on the occasion of Margaret's parents' 33rd wedding anniversary. During this party, a relative is shooting home movies the lighting, is blinding, and so‐called normal behavior becomes abnormal or forced. The actors perform within a performance: they realize that movies—home movies—are for posterity, a reservoir of information, a cheerful record... Barbra Streisand is Barbra Streisand (love her or leave her) trying to be ordinary, but being beautiful."

Streisand's performance was also praised by her former husband, the actor, Elliott Gould in a 1973 interview with The New York Times: " Did you see her in Up the Sandbox? She's more refined in that than I've ever seen her before. I'm real proud of Barbra."

On Rotten Tomatoes, the film has a 71% rating based on seven reviews.

=== Box office ===
The film under-performed and was Streisand's first box office flop. In a 1977 Playboy interview, Streisand reflected on the commercial failure of the film: "I don’t think people wanted to see me play a housewife who wasn’t funny. It was very discouraging."

=== Home media ===
Up the Sandbox was released in a Region 1 DVD on October 5, 2004, as a part of the Barbra Streisand Collection.

== See also ==
- List of American films of 1972
