= Kathleen Tynan =

Canadian-British author (1937–1995)

Kathleen Jeannette Halton Tynan
- Born: January 25, 1937
- Died: January 10, 1995 (aged 57); London
- Occupations: Journalist, author, screenwriter
- Notable work: "The Summer Aeroplane" (1975), "Agatha" (1979)

Kathleen Jeannette Halton Tynan (January 25, 1937 – January 10, 1995) was a Canadian-British journalist, author, and screenwriter.

== Early life ==
Halton was the daughter of Canadian war correspondent Matthew Halton (1904–56) and Jean Campbell (1906–2001), and the sister of television journalist David Halton. She attended Oxford University before working for Newsweek, The Observer, and The Sunday Times in London.

In 1967, she gave up her career in journalism to marry theatre critic Kenneth Tynan (1927–80). She had previously been married to Oliver Gates; that marriage ended in divorce. Kenneth Tynan was married when the couple's relationship began. She also had a subsequent relationship with Franco-Swiss director Barbet Schroeder (born 1941).

== Work ==
She published a novel, The Summer Aeroplane, in 1975. The novel was later adapted into the film Agatha – about the disappearance of Agatha Christie in the 1920s – starring Dustin Hoffman and Vanessa Redgrave. Tynan collaborated with Arthur Hopcraft on the screenplay. She later wrote a screenplay based on Louise Brooks' autobiography Lulu in Hollywood, but this film never was made.

Following Kenneth Tynan's death in 1980, she wrote the biography The Life of Kenneth Tynan (1987), her best-known book. She subsequently edited Profiles (1990), an anthology of her second husband's writing, as well as an anthology of his letters in 1994. She published some of her own theatre and literary criticism as well before her death from cancer in 1995.

Kathleen Tynan was mentioned in Helen Fielding's 1996 novel Bridget Jones's Diary: "I read in an article that Kathleen Tynan, late wife of the late Kenneth, had 'inner poise' and, when writing, was to be found immaculately dressed, sitting at a small table in the center of the room sipping at a glass of chilled white wine", that information coming from Tynan's obituary by Joan Juliet Buck.

In the television film Kenneth Tynan: In Praise of Hardcore (2005), she was portrayed by Catherine McCormack.
