= Bananas, Crackers and Nuts =

- M*A*S*H episode
- Episode no.: Season 1 Episode 7
- Directed by: Bruce Bilson
- Written by: Burt Styler
- Production code: J311
- Original air date: November 5, 1972

Guest appearances
- Odessa Cleveland; Stuart Margolin; Marcia Strassman

Episode chronology
← Previous "Yankee Doodle Doctor"	Next → "Cowboy"
- M*A*S*H season 1

"Bananas, Crackers and Nuts" is the seventh episode of the television series M*A*S*H. It was first broadcast on November 5, 1972, and repeated April 22, 1973. It was written by Burt Styler and directed by Bruce Bilson.

Guest cast is Odessa Cleveland as Lt. Ginger Bayliss, Stuart Margolin as Captain Phillip G. Sherman and Marcia Strassman as Nurse Margie Cutler.

Editor Fred W. Berger won an ACE Eddie Award from the American Cinema Editors organization (ACE) for his work on this episode.

== Plot ==
After an unusually long stretch in the OR, Hawkeye and Trapper argue, and decide that they need some R&R. Unfortunately, Henry is leaving for a few days, leaving Frank—who is unlikely to let them have R&R for any reason—in charge.

Hawkeye decides to pretend to be insane to try to get a few days off despite Frank's prejudice. He rejects a proposition from an attractive nurse, eats a plate of ostensibly human liver in full surgical garb, and reacts violently when Frank touches the plate. Trapper tells Frank that Hawkeye is losing it, and that he (Trapper) should take him to Tokyo for R&R.

Uncertain about whether they are serious or if it is an elaborate act, Margaret calls in a psychiatrist friend, Capt. Philip Sherman (Stuart Margolin), to assess Hawkeye's emotional state. After Hawkeye tells Sherman that he is in love with Frank, Sherman declares him to be insane. When Henry returns and learns of Sherman's finding, he argues that Hawkeye was merely trying to get R&R, but Sherman insists that Hawkeye needs to be committed to a hospital in Tokyo.

Hawkeye, upon hearing this, confesses he simply wanted a holiday from the war, but Sherman, who has designs on Margaret, insists that he be sent for treatment. Hawkeye concocts with Radar an elaborate plan to foil Sherman, Margaret and Frank's plan to get Hawkeye out of the unit. Radar talks to Sherman and plants ideas in his mind that Margaret, who has rebuffed all of Sherman's past advances, has the hots for him. Meanwhile, Trapper switches signs on Margaret's tent, leading Sherman to believe it is the VIP tent. After Sherman returns and settles in Margaret's cot, Trapper switches the signs back. When Margaret comes back and starts undressing, Sherman excitedly launches himself at her and drags her onto the cot. Margaret screams out and various members of the camp rush in, making it appear that Sherman was attempting to rape Margaret. Sherman flees the unit that night and Hawkeye is allowed to stay. He and Trapper are granted a week's R&R, but just as they are about to leave, a wave of fresh casualties ruins their plans.

== Themes ==
In Watching M*A*S*H, Watching America, a sociological examination of M*A*S*H as an illustration of shifting American values in the 1970s and early 1980s, James H. Wittebols cites Sherman's attempted assault on Margaret in this episode as an example of the program's questionable treatment of women in its early years. Wittebols also notes the subplot of Hawkeye pretending to be in love with Frank (in order to convince Sherman that he is insane) as an example of the series' negative treatment of homosexuality.
