= The Beasts Are on the Streets =

1978 American television thriller film

- Title card
- Genre: Thriller
- Written by: Laurence Heath
- Directed by: Peter R. Hunt
- Starring: Carol Lynley; Billy Green Bush; Philip Michael Thomas
- Music by: Gerald Fried
- Country of origin: United States
- Original language: English

Production
- Executive producer: Joseph Barbera
- Producer: Harry R. Sherman
- Production locations: Dallas; Arlington, Texas; Grand Prairie, Texas
- Cinematography: Chuck Arnold
- Editor: Argyle Nelson
- Running time: 100 minutes
- Production company: Hanna-Barbera Productions

Original release
- Network: NBC
- Release: May 18, 1978

The Beasts Are on the Streets is a 1978 American made-for-television thriller film produced by Hanna-Barbera Productions (although known primarily as an animation studio, this was one of several live-action Hanna-Barbera productions), directed by Peter R. Hunt and starring Carol Lynley, Billy Green Bush and Philip Michael Thomas. It was filmed on location in Grand Prairie, Texas and Arlington, Texas and originally broadcast on NBC on May 18, 1978.

== Plot ==
A tanker truck crashes through a fence of a wildlife preserve in Texas, releasing a variety of wild animals including bison, zebras, camels, antelopes, ostriches, elephants, lions, rhinos, tigers, and bears, into the surrounding community.

Dr. Claire McCauley, a dedicated veterinarian, works with Kevin Johnson, the head ranger of the wildlife park, to manage the situation. They are joined by park rangers and local police officers as they desperately scramble to recapture the escaped animals.

Meanwhile, two trigger-happy hunters, Jim Scudder and Al Loring, decide to go big-game hunting amid the community chaos.

== Cast ==
- Carol Lynley as Dr. Claire McCauley
- Dale Robinette as Kevin Johnson
- Billy Green Bush as Jim Scudder
- Philip Michael Thomas as Eddie Morgan
- Casey Biggs as Rick
- Burton Gilliam as Al Loring
- Sharon Ullrick as Lucetta Gaynes
- Anna Lee as Mrs. Jackson
- Bill Thurman as Carl Evans
- David Little as Child Actor

== DVD release ==
On July 22, 2013, Warner Home Video released The Beasts Are on the Streets on DVD in Region 1 for the first time via their Warner Archive Collection. This is a Manufacture-on-Demand (MOD) release, available through Warner's online store and Amazon.com.
