= The Call of the Wild (1976 film) =

1976 American television film based on Jack London's novel directed by Jerry Jameson

- Genre: Adventure
- Based on: The Call of the Wild by Jack London
- Screenplay by: James Dickey
- Directed by: Jerry Jameson
- Starring: John Beck; Billy Green Bush; Dennis Burkley
- Music by: Peter Matz
- Country of origin: United States
- Original language: English

Production
- Executive producer: Charles W. Fries
- Producer: Malcolm Stuart
- Production locations: Pocahontas State Park, State Park Road, Chesterfield, Virginia; Brunswick County, Virginia
- Cinematography: Matthew F. Leonetti
- Editor: Tom Stevens
- Running time: 100 min.
- Production company: Charles Fries Productions

Original release
- Network: NBC
- Release: May 22, 1976

The Call of the Wild is a 1976 American television film based on Jack London's 1903 novel The Call of the Wild. The film, starring John Beck, was directed by Jerry Jameson from a script by poet and novelist James Dickey. One of several adaptations of London's novel, this version was produced following the success of the 1972 film Deliverance, an adaptation of Dickey's novel of the same title. The author's son, Christopher Dickey, wrote in his 1998 memoir, Summer of Deliverance, that "[t]he Hollywood concept [for the 1976 film] was James Dickey meets Jack London; sort of Deliverance in the Klondike."

== Cast ==
- John Beck as John Thornton
- Bernard Fresson as François
- John McLiam as Prospector
- Donald Moffat as Simpson
- Michael Pataki as Stranger
- Penelope Windust as Rosemary
- Billy Green Bush as "Redsweater"
