= Billy Green Bush =

American actor

- Born: William Warren Bush; November 7, 1935 (age 90); Montgomery, Alabama, U.S.
- Other name: Billy Greenbush
- Occupation: Actor
- Years active: 1966–1993
- Spouse: Carole Kay
- Children: Clay, Lindsay, Sidney

William Warren Bush (born November 7, 1935) is an American actor usually credited as Billy Green Bush, and sometimes as Billy Greenbush.

== Typecast ==
Bush is a character actor, typically projecting in his screen appearances the good-ol'-boy image. He portrays mostly sheriffs and state troopers, although in his repertoire there are the occasional villains.

== Film ==
Bush's film work includes appearances in The Savage Seven (1968), Five Easy Pieces (1970), Monte Walsh (1970), The Jesus Trip (1971), The Organization (1971), Welcome Home, Soldier Boys (1972), The Culpepper Cattle Co. (1972), 40 Carats (1973), Electra Glide in Blue (1973) where his performance caused some critics to characterize his screen persona as "irrepressibly unique"; Alice Doesn't Live Here Anymore (1974), Mackintosh and T.J. (1975), The Call of the Wild (1976), The Beasts Are on the Streets (1978), The Jericho Mile (1979), Tom Horn (1980), The River (1984), The Hitcher (1986), Critters (1986), Rampage (1987) and Jason Goes to Hell: The Final Friday (1993).

== Television ==
Bush has appeared frequently on television, including a recurring role as Bobby Angel on Hill Street Blues and an episode of M*A*S*H, in which his character, “Cowboy”, tries to kill commanding officer Henry Blake.

He twice portrayed Vernon Presley, the father of Elvis Presley, first in the 1988 TV movie Elvis and Me, which was based on the 1985 memoir of the same name by Presley's ex-wife Priscilla, and then in the short-lived weekly series Elvis in 1990.

== Personal life ==
Bush is the father of twins Lindsay and Sidney Greenbush (retired child actresses who alternately starred as Carrie in Little House on the Prairie) and actor Clay Greenbush.

== Selected filmography ==
- 1966 Unholy Matrimony as Eavesdropping Husband (uncredited)
- 1968 The Savage Seven as Seely
- 1969 The Reivers as Patron
- 1970 Five Easy Pieces as Elton
- 1970 Monte Walsh as "Powder" Kent
- 1971 The Jesus Trip as Tarboro
- 1971 The Organization as Dave Thomas
- 1972 Welcome Home, Soldier Boys as Sheriff
- 1972 The Culpepper Cattle Co. as Frank Culpepper
- 1972 M*A*S*H as John "Cowboy" Hodges
- 1972 Mister Brown
- 1973 40 Carats as J.D. Rogers
- 1973 Electra Glide in Blue as Officer "Zipper" Davis
- 1973 Gunsmoke as Kermit
- 1973 The Rookies as Country Marc Rogers
- 1974 Alice Doesn't Live Here Anymore as Donald Hyatt
- 1975 Mackintosh and T.J. as Luke
- 1976 The Call of the Wild as "Redsweater"
- 1976 The Invasion of Johnson County as Frank Canton
- 1978 The Beasts Are on the Streets as Jim Scudder
- 1978-1982 The Incredible Hulk as Ray Thomas / Sheriff Carl Decker
- 1979 The Jericho Mile as Warden Earl Gulliver
- 1980 Tom Horn as U.S. Marshal Joe Belle
- 1984 The River as Harvey "Harve" Stanley
- 1986 The Hitcher as Trooper Donner
- 1986 Critters as Jay Brown
- 1986 The Deliberate Stranger (TV) as Officer Bradley
- 1987 Rampage as Judge McKinsey
- 1991 Conagher as Jacob Teale
- 1993 Jason Goes to Hell: The Final Friday as Sheriff Ed Landis (final film role)
