= Speedtrap (film) =

1977 film by Earl Bellamy

- Threatical Poster
- Directed by: Earl Bellamy
- Written by: Fred Mintz (Story); Henry C. Parke (Story); Stuart A. Segal (Screenplay); Walter M. Spear (Screenplay)
- Produced by: Howard Pine; Fred Mintz
- Starring: Joe Don Baker; Tyne Daly
- Cinematography: Dennis Dalzell
- Edited by: Mike Vejar
- Music by: Anthony Harris
- Distributed by: First Artists
- Release date: April 21, 1977; (UK)
- Running time: 113 minutes

Speedtrap is 1977 police chase action film starring Joe Don Baker and Tyne Daly.

== Plot ==
After a wave of unsolved car thefts, an insurance company calls in private investigator Pete Novick (Joe Don Baker) to solve the case. While the chief of police isn't thrilled about having an outsider come and show up his men, one of the officers is a former girlfriend of Novick's who's more than willing to help him out in any way she can. After a long and convoluted investigation with false leads, psychics and the mafia, Novick at last unravels the identity of the thief.

== Cast ==
- Joe Don Baker as Pete Novick
- Tyne Daly as Nifty Nolan
- Richard Jaeckel as Billy
- Robert Loggia as Spillano
- Lana Wood as Blossom
- Morgan Woodward as Hogan
- Timothy Carey as Loomis
