= National General Corporation =

Film distribution and production company, 1951–1974

- Industry: Motion pictures
- Predecessor: Fox Theatres
- Founded: 1951; 75 years ago
- Defunct: February 1974; 52 years ago
- Fate: Liquidation
- Successor: Mann Theatres; Library: Skydance Corporation, via Warner Bros. and CBS
- Number of locations: 240 (1973; theaters); 6 (1969; distribution offices)
- Products: Film distribution, film exhibition, television production and distribution
- Production output: Theatrical films
- Services: Film distribution Film exhibition
- Divisions: National General Pictures; National General Records

National General Corporation (NGC) was a theater chain holding company, film distribution and production company and was considered one of the "instant majors". It was in operation from 1951 to 1974.

== Divisions ==
Its division National General Pictures (NGP) was a production company which was active between 1967 and 1973. NGP produced nine motion pictures in-house. The company was a division of the National General Corporation (NGC) which started as the spun out Fox Theatre chain of movie houses, which were later sold to the Mann Theatres Corporation.

National General had its own record label, National General Records, that operated for at least three years and was distributed by Buddah Records.

The company also owned its television production in the late 1960s with National General Television Productions, which was sold to Filmways in 1971. The company produced a daily sitcom for syndication, The Trouble With Tracy.

== History ==
year	Theaters
1951	550
1957	275
1973	240

National General Corporation was a film distribution network and the successor of 20th Century Fox's theater division with 550 theaters when spun off in 1951 and reduced in half by court order six years later. (Note: Cook, p. 400.) It was originally led by Charles Skouras. Gene Klein later took control of the company.

National General entered distribution in 1966 under a three-year waiver from the consent decrees (Note: Cook, pp. 331-332.) with six distribution offices. (Note: Cook, p. 333.) In 1967, the CBS television network decided to produce their own films for theatrical release through their production unit Cinema Center Films (CCF), which were released through National General.

National General also acquired Sy Weintraub's Banner Productions in 1967 which was producing Tarzan films and the TV series. NGC had also entered theatrical film production under Charles Boasberg in 1967 as National General Pictures (NGP). The ABC television network had done the same thing with Cinerama in the formation of another instant major partnership. In 1969, after a request for an indefinite waiver, the consent decree waiver was extended for another three years. NGC gained another production partner in 1969 with the formation of First Artists Productions (FAP).

In 1968, Grosset & Dunlap (which also owned Bantam Books and Transworld Publishers) was acquired by National General Corporation. The company also acquired insurer Great American. The company tried to acquire Warner Bros.-Seven Arts in 1969, but the deal was rejected on antitrust grounds by the Justice Department, Warner Bros. was subsequently sold to Kinney National Service, Inc. in summer 1969, and NGP was closed in 1970. By 1970, all the instant majors had each captured 10% of the market.

By April 1969 National General had produced five films over two years. The month it received a three-year extension from a judge to pursue its role as a producer, distributor and exhibitor, NG's head, Irving Levin, announced National General would make 13 films, costing $35 million in all. Six of them would be made in Hollywood. These were:

- The Cheyenne Social Club
- El Condor
- The Schmid Case - based on the Charles Schmid case directed by Barry Sjear
- The Sophomore - a college student gets his girlfriend pregnant, produced by Frank Coe
- Enemy Enemy - based on Bud Freeman play directed by Jerry Paris
- Another Kind of Love - comedy written and directed by Arnold Schulman
- The French Connection - based on the novel by Robin Moore with director William Friedkin - this was made at Fox
- The Valdez Horses based on novel by Lee Hoffman
- I Want It Now based on novel by Kingsley Amis
- Forty Lashes Less One based on novel by Elmore Leonard
- Your Own Thing based on play by Hal Hester
- The Grasshoppper
- A Bird in the Hand directed in England by Peter Collinson about the wife of a young English teacher - this was never made.

Following Cinema Center's closure, NGC was taken over by American Financial Corporation in 1972, but continued distributing films until 1973. In November 1973, American Financial sold NGC/NGP's releasing contracts and film library to Warner Bros. National General, then just containing 240 theaters, were sold in 1973 to Mann Theatres. In 1974, film and television company Filmways bought Grosset & Dunlap from American Financial Group. American Financial also sold Bantam to the Italian firm IFI in 1974.

Later heads of production inclide Dan A. Polier.

== Partial list of film titles ==
=== 1960s ===
Release date	Title	Production company
September 6, 1967	Tarzan's Jungle Rebellion	A two-part episode of the 1966 Tarzan TV series
August 7, 1968	With Six You Get Eggroll	CCF
August 21, 1968	How Sweet It Is!	
December 25, 1968	The Stalking Moon	
March 13, 1969	Charro!	
May 10, 1969	A Fine Pair	CCF; European production
May 28, 1969	The April Fools	CCF
July 2, 1969	Daddy's Gone A-Hunting	
July 13, 1969	Me, Natalie	CCF
October 4, 1969	Hail, Hero!	CCF
October 6, 1969	The Royal Hunt of the Sun	CCF; British production
October 22, 1969	The Grasshopper	
November 1969	Day of Anger	European production filmed in 1967
December 4, 1969	A Boy Named Charlie Brown	CCF
December 15, 1969	A Dream of Kings	
December 25, 1969	The Reivers	CCF

=== 1970s ===
Release date	Title	Production company
March 17, 1970	The Boys in the Band	Cinema Center Films (CCF)
April 29, 1970	A Man Called Horse	CCF
June 12, 1970	The Cheyenne Social Club	
June 19, 1970	El Condor	European production
July 22, 1970	Something for Everyone	CCF
July 1970	Tarzan's Deadly Silence	A two-part episode of the 1966 Tarzan TV series
August 14, 1970	Darker than Amber	CCF
September 22, 1970	Adam at Six A.M.	CCF
October 1, 1970	The Baby Maker	National General
October 7, 1970	Monte Walsh	CCF
November 5, 1970	Scrooge	CCF; British production
November 23, 1970	Homer	CCF
December 4, 1970	Latitude Zero	Japanese production
December 18, 1970	Rio Lobo	CCF
December 23, 1970	Little Big Man	CCF
May 21, 1971	The Cat o' Nine Tails	European production
May 26, 1971	Big Jake	CCF
June 1, 1971	Blue Water, White Death	CCF; documentary
June 15, 1971	Who Is Harry Kellerman and Why Is He Saying Those Terrible Things About Me?	CCF
June 23, 1971	Le Mans	CCF
July 16, 1971	The Light at the Edge of the World	European production
July 18, 1971	Figures in a Landscape	British production
October 20, 1971	The Todd Killings	National General
October 1971	The African Elephant	CCF; documentary
November 1971	The Christian Licorice Store	CCF
November 1971	Something Big	CCF
January 9, 1972	Eagle in a Cage	European production
February 1, 1972	Pocket Money	First Artists
March 1972	The Little Ark	
June 1, 1972	The War Between Men and Women	CCF
June 21, 1972	The Revengers	CCF
June 22, 1972	The Dead Are Alive	European production
June 28, 1972	Prime Cut	CCF
August 9, 1972	Snoopy Come Home	CCF
October 1972	Lapin 360	
October 1972	Treasure Island	European production
December 8, 1972	The Master Touch	European production
December 13, 1972	The Getaway	First Artists
December 18, 1972	The Life and Times of Judge Roy Bean	First Artists
December 21, 1972	Up the Sandbox	First Artists
1973	One Armed Boxer	Hong Kong production
March 4, 1973	Baxter!	British production
March 1973	Fists of Fury	Hong Kong production
May 1, 1973	The Chinese Connection	Hong Kong production
May 16, 1973	Extreme Close-Up	National General
May 23, 1973	A Warm December	First Artists
July 13, 1973	Lady Ice	National General
August 1, 1973	Maurie	National General
September 5, 1973	Hapkido	Hong Kong production
September 24, 1973	The Man Called Noon	British production
September 24, 1973	The New One-Armed Swordsman	Hong Kong production
October 7, 1973	The Second Gun	Documentary on the assassination of Robert F. Kennedy
October 24, 1973	Massacre in Rome	European production
November 7, 1973	Executive Action	National General
January 2, 1974	Chinese Hercules	Hong Kong production
