= Tom Horn (film) =

1980 film

- Theatrical release poster
- Directed by: William Wiard
- Screenplay by: Thomas McGuane; Bud Shrake
- Based on: Life of Tom Horn, Government Scout and Interpreter; 1904 novel by Tom Horn
- Produced by: Fred Weintraub
- Starring: Steve McQueen; Linda Evans; Richard Farnsworth
- Cinematography: John A. Alonzo
- Edited by: George Grenville
- Music by: Ernest Gold
- Color process: Technicolor
- Production companies: First Artists; Solar Productions
- Distributed by: Warner Bros. Pictures
- Release date: March 28, 1980
- Running time: 98 minutes
- Country: United States
- Language: English
- Box office: $9 million

Tom Horn is a 1980 American Western film directed by William Wiard and starring Steve McQueen as the legendary lawman, outlaw and gunfighter Tom Horn. It was based on Horn's own writings.

== Plot ==
in 1901 Tom Horn, a legendary frontier scout and tracker who helped capture Geronimo, is a drifter in the disappearing Western frontier at the turn of the twentieth century. The story begins as he rides into a small town and encounters prizefighter Jim Corbett. Horn ends up in a livery stable, unconscious and badly bruised.

Cattle rancher John Coble finds Horn in the livery and offers him the use of his ranch to recuperate. He also offers him work investigating and deterring cattle rustlers who steal from the grazing association to which he belongs. Coble implies that the association will support Horn in implementing vigilante justice and also receives U.S. marshal Joe Belle's informal approval at an association picnic. Horn accepts the offer at the picnic and also becomes acquainted with Glendolene, the local schoolteacher.

Calling himself a "stock detective," as Coble told him to do, Horn confronts cowboys at an auction. After giving them fair warning, he goes on a one-man crusade to kill or otherwise drive off anyone who rustles the cattle of his benefactors.

Horn's methods are brutal but effective. The cattle rustling stops. After a public gunfight, the local townspeople become alarmed at his violent nature, and public opinion turns against him. The large cattle ranchers realize that, although he is doing exactly what they hired him to do, his tactics will ultimately tarnish their image, so they begin to plot his demise. Marshal Belle, who has political ambitions, also wants Horn out of the way. Their conspiracy is set in motion when a young boy tending sheep, the bane of cattle ranchers, is shot by a .45–60, the same caliber rifle that Tom Horn is known to use.

Horn is slow to realize that he is being set up. Proud and convinced of his own innocence, he refuses to leave the county or avoid town. Glendolene and Coble warn him to be careful, but Horn ignores the warning. Joe Belle coaxes Horn from a saloon back to his office, where a newspaperman transcribing their conversation is hidden in the next room. Horn does not admit to the young boy's murder and is incredulous that a rifle such as his could have made the shot at the great distance that Belle asserts. Horn states, "If I'd have killed that kid, it would have been the best shot I ever made and the dirtiest trick I ever done." Based on this conversation, Horn is taken prisoner.

Unable to come and go freely into his beloved hills, Horn seems lost and reminisces. He breaks out of jail and attempts to flee. He is recaptured and convicted based on the testimony of the newspaperman who skewed the conversation between Belle and Horn into an admission of guilt.

As his execution nears, Horn accepts his fate and remains resolved in the moments before he is hanged.

== Cast ==
- Steve McQueen as Tom Horn
- Linda Evans as Glendolene Kimmel
- Richard Farnsworth as John C. Coble
- Billy Green Bush as U.S. Marshal Joe Belle
- Slim Pickens as Sheriff Sam Creedmore
- Peter Canon as Assistant Prosecutor
- Elisha Cook as Stablehand
- Roy Jenson as Lee Mendenhour
- James Kline as Arlo Chance
- Geoffrey Lewis as Walter Stoll
- Harry Northup as Thomas Burke
- Steve Oliver as Jim "Gentleman Jim" Corbett
- Bill Thurman as Ora Haley
- Bert Williams as Judge
- Bobby Bass as Corbett's Bodyguard
- Mickey Jones as Brown's Hole Rustler
- Mel Novak as Corbett's Bodyguard
- Clark Coleman as Jimmy Nolt
- Drummond Barclay as Charlie Ohnhouse
- Chuck Hayward as Deputy Earl Proctor

== Production ==
Since the troubled production and disastrous release of An Enemy of the People, Steve McQueen had once again struggled to find work. He priced himself out of roles in a Towering Inferno sequel, Raise the Titanic, was rejected for the Salkinds' Superman film due to his growing weight, turned down a role in Close Encounters of the Third Kind and walked out on Richard Fleischer's planned adaptation of Tai-Pan when the second $1 million installment of his announced $10 million fee failed to arrive (the actor had earned $1 million for no work already).

After his divorce from Ali MacGraw, though, McQueen decided to get back into films. Initially, he wanted to adapt Harold Pinter's play Old Times, but First Artists insisted that he instead film Tom Horn, a script it had owned for some time, as the final film in the star's three-picture deal he had signed with Warner Bros. Pictures.

The film would go into production in 1978, but it faced stiff competition, with United Artists planning a film about Horn as a vehicle for Robert Redford. The latter dropped out, and the film about Horn's younger years was made by CBS as a four-hour TV movie, entitled Mr. Horn, with David Carradine. It aired just as the Warner Bros.-First Artists film went into production, receiving poor ratings.

McQueen ordered several rewrites to the script, while original director Don Siegel left, to be replaced by first Elliot Silverstein, then James William Guercio, who was fired by McQueen after three days.

McQueen wanted to direct, but the Directors Guild of America's rules forbidding actors from taking over direction once filming had begun, scotched these plans, and TV movie director William Wiard was brought in to finish the film. This was Wiard's only credit for directing a feature film. The press book accompanying the release of the film did not mention Wiard in the filmmakers section or give a biography.

Post-production was similarly fraught; the producers attempting both a linear version of the film, then another telling the story in flashback, before settling on the former approach. The film was still being edited ahead of its March 1980 release date.

Although filming ended without problems, during production McQueen had trouble breathing and later was found to have a rare and aggressive form of lung cancer, malignant mesothelioma. Around this time, McQueen filmed his last movie The Hunter, released just three months before his death, on November 7.

== Reception ==
Jim Harwood of Variety called it "a sorry ending to the once high hopes of the star-studded founding of First Artists Prods."
