= Pocket Money =

1972 film

- Theatrical poster
- Directed by: Stuart Rosenberg
- Screenplay by: Terrence Malick
- Adaptation by: John Gay
- Based on: Jim Kane; 1970 novel by J.P.S. Brown
- Produced by: John Foreman
- Starring: Paul Newman; Lee Marvin; Strother Martin; Hector Elizondo
- Cinematography: László Kovács
- Edited by: Bob Wyman
- Music by: Alex North
- Production company: First Artists
- Distributed by: National General Pictures
- Release date: February 14, 1972 (U.S.)
- Running time: 102 minutes
- Country: United States
- Language: English
- Budget: $2,444,000

Pocket Money is a 1972 American neo-Western buddy comedy film directed by Stuart Rosenberg, from a screenplay written by Terrence Malick and based on the 1970 novel Jim Kane by J. P. S. Brown. The film stars Paul Newman and Lee Marvin and takes place in 1970s Arizona and northern Mexico.

It was filmed mostly in the small town of Ajo, Arizona. Portions of the film were shot at Southwestern Studios in Carefree, Arizona, a facility built by cast member Fred Graham.

According to co-star Wayne Rogers, in an episode of Pop Goes the Culture, Newman and Marvin did not get along especially well during production. This movie was one of three films that Newman, Rogers, and Rosenberg made together; the others being Cool Hand Luke (1967) and WUSA (1970).

The song "Pocket Money" is composed and performed by Carole King.

== Plot ==
Broke and in debt, an otherwise honest cowboy known as Jim Kane gets mixed up in some shady dealings with Stretch Russell and Bill Garrett, a crooked rancher. Russell tells Kane to escort 250 head of cattle from Mexico to the United States for a good sum of money. Kane agrees and brings along his friend Leonard to aid him. Unfortunately, the two come upon many unexpected events that often deter them from completing their job.

== Cast ==
- Paul Newman as Jim Kane
- Lee Marvin as Leonard
- Strother Martin as Bill Garrett
- Wayne Rogers as Stretch Russell
- Hector Elizondo as Juan
- Christine Belford as Adelita
- Kelly Jean Peters as Sharon (Kane's ex-wife)
- Gregory Sierra as Guerro Chavarin
- Fred Graham as Uncle Herb
- Matt Clark as American prisoner
- Claudio Miranda as Ministerio Publico
- Terrence Malick as Worksman

== Reception ==
Roger Ebert of the Chicago Sun-Times gave the film two stars out of four and wrote, "The movie seems to be going for a highly mannered, elliptical, enigmatic style, and it gets there. We don't." Gene Siskel of the Chicago Tribune gave the film zero stars out of four and called the performances by the two leads "completely self-indulgent," suggesting that "Maybe Newman and Marvin made it because they wanted to go slumming in Mexico for two weeks. On that basis, 'Pocket Money' can be considered a 35-millimeter home movie of what Paul Newman and Lee Marvin did last summer." Vincent Canby of The New York Times called it "a fragmented, far-from-great movie, and it won't change cinema history, but in its own odd fashion it celebrates humdrum lives without ever resorting to patronizing artifice." Kevin Thomas of the Los Angeles Times wrote that Newman and Marvin had "found precisely the right material to enable them not only to play off each other but also to shine individually. This delightful contemporary comedy-western in fact is that most precious of commodities these days: a movie that actually cheers you up and leaves you feeling better when you come out than when you went in."

TV Guide wrote in a retrospective review, "Paul Newman, Sidney Poitier, Barbra Streisand, Steve McQueen, and Dustin Hoffman formed First Artists, and this was their premier offering. It wasn't as terrible a movie as the first reviews of it indicated, but since so much was expected, anything less than brilliance was a letdown." On Rotten Tomatoes, the film has a 50% rating based on reviews from 8 critics.

== See also ==
- List of American films of 1972
