= The Jericho Mile =

- Genre: Crime; Drama; Sport
- Screenplay by: Patrick J. Nolan; Michael Mann
- Story by: Patrick J. Nolan
- Directed by: Michael Mann
- Starring: Peter Strauss; Richard Lawson
- Music by: Jimmie Haskell
- Country of origin: United States
- Original language: English

Production
- Producer: Tim Zinnemann
- Production location: Folsom State Prison
- Cinematography: Rexford L. Metz
- Editor: Arthur Schmidt
- Running time: 97 minutes
- Production company: ABC Circle Films

Original release
- Network: ABC
- Release: March 18, 1979

The Jericho Mile is a 1979 American made for TV crime sports film directed by Michael Mann. The film won five awards, including three Emmy Awards. The story is set at Folsom State Prison, and the film was shot on location there amongst the prison population.

== Plot ==
Larry Murphy was convicted of first degree murder and is serving a life term in Folsom Prison for shooting his father, which he feels was justified because his father was raping his stepsister. In prison he is nicknamed "Lickety Split" by the other inmates, but remains a loner who has only one person he calls a friend: a black inmate named Stiles. The film centers around his obsession for running around the prison yard. Larry has no idea how fast he is actually running until the prison psychologist has the prison sports writer time him. Once the warden finds out just how fast Murphy is, he has the state track and field coach bring up a couple of his distance runners to run against Murphy. Murphy beats them and ultimately allows the track coach to train him in anticipation of the upcoming Olympic trials. Before that can happen however, a new track has to be built to proper specs in the yard for Murphy to run on so he can register an official time to be eligible to compete at the Olympic trials. The Warden asks the inmates to volunteer to build the new track.

Stiles manages to swing a deal with the head of the white gang, Dr. D, to get a conjugal visit with his wife three months early so he can see his new baby. Instead of Stiles' wife showing up, one of Dr. D's drug "mules" is put in her place so that Stiles can bring in some drugs. Stiles refuses to participate and goes back to his cell, resulting in the "mule" getting arrested.

Stiles tells Murphy what happened and Murphy convinces Stiles to go into isolation. However, Stiles is killed after the prisoners are let out. The conflicts continue with Murphy and the white and black gangs and, as a result, the white gang boycotts the building of the track and forms a picket line that the other gangs refuse to cross.

As the story continues, the truth unfolds and a gang fight ensues as the blacks and the Hispanics challenge the validity of the picket line. The track is built and Murphy clocks a qualifying time while beating Frank Davies (considered to be one of the fastest milers in the U.S.) to be able to compete in the Olympic trials. Murphy is then called before the U.S. Olympic board, where it is learned that it was never the board's intention to let a convicted murderer compete at the Olympic trials. Murphy is antagonized by the board member to try to find out if Murphy is sorry for what he did to his father. In a fit of anger, Murphy admits he would "blow him away" all over again given the same set of circumstances.

With his shot at the Olympics over, life at Folsom Prison returns to normal. Murphy hears that Frank Davies has qualified for the Olympics with an exceptional time. He then goes to his cell and grabs the stopwatch (given to him by Dr. Janowski) and his spikes. Murphy sets himself up on the start line with the obvious intention of seeing how he would have done had he raced against Davies. Murphy races as hard as he can while grabbing the attention of the prison inmates once more. As he crosses the finish line, a group of inmates are waiting with huge anticipation as to how Murphy did. An inmate grabs the stopwatch and yells out that Murphy beat Davies' time, at which point Murphy throws the stopwatch against the prison wall, smashing it to pieces.

== Cast ==
- Peter Strauss as Larry Murphy
- Richard Lawson as R.C. Stiles
- Roger E. Mosley as "Cotton" Crown
- Brian Dennehy as Dr. D.
- Geoffrey Lewis as Dr. Bill Janowski
- Billy Green Bush as Warden Earl Gulliver
- Ed Lauter as Jerry Beloit
- Burton Gilliam as Jimmy-Jack

== Development ==
The film originated as a story by Patrick Nolan. According to Peter Strauss, Nolan was "an English professor" at Villanova University and the story "sat on the shelf until I expressed a desire to ABC to do something totally contrary to what I had played in previous roles. Young Michael Mann from Chicago was brought in to write the script." Mann had been wanting to direct a TV movie for ABC, and originally his project was to be Swan Song (ultimately directed by Jerry London), but that was delayed due to an injury on the part of lead actor David Soul.

Michael Mann had been hired by Dustin Hoffman to do a rewrite on the film Straight Time (1978). This was based on a novel by Eddie Bunker, and as part of his research, Mann spent a lot of time with Bunker and visited Folsom Prison. Mann later recalled:

I thought that it'd be a downtrodden prison population with kind of a forceful population of prison guards controlling convicts. And it was the exact inverse. All the guards looked like — there used to be these ads in the back of magazines for Charles Atlas: "You can build up your body if you buy this elastic rubber band thing." These guys all looked like the before [picture]... And the prison population guys who were working out were aggressive. You could tell they were very self-possessed. [They] found any way they could of expressing their individuality in terms of wearing shorts or basically a lot of hip-hop wardrobe was observable in the early '70s in prison systems.

Mann became fascinated by life inside the prison, which was he says was run by three gangs: the Black Guerrilla Family, Bluebirds (later the Aryan Brotherhood) and the Mexican Mafia. "It was as if the whole of our body politic, our culture, our society had all been compressed and into a geographically compressed space," he says. "Almost like a lab experiment. A bad lab experiment. And so all the dynamics that were outside were inside on steroids."

Michael Mann recalled in another interview:

I walked by one cell one day in one of the cell blocks and there were these pictures on the wall of a man and his wife having sex on a conjugal visit. There was the birth of their child, in bad black-and-white photographs, and it just rocked me. Because I knew enough to know that this guy was doing the hardest kind of time. And the hardest kind of time is when you really are in tune with the world that you are excluded from. Every minute, every hour, every day. And that’s also a form of–that is the reality. And this guy was escaping it not at all. And that was very poignant, and that became the idea for the character Stiles [played by Richard Lawson], who gets killed part of the way through, that he didn’t have Playboy centerfolds in his cell. He had real pictures of the real life that he wasn’t part of. And Murphy was an authentic character who starts to have expectations. And if you have expectations, now you’re approaching, your head’s approaching where Lawson is, as his expectations are destroyed, because he can’t race outside. The ending of the film is really kind of a counterpoint. He runs and wins the fastest time, so there’s a triumph, and at one and the same time, he’s lost his soul.

Strauss says he "was so impressed" by Mann's script "I asked if he could direct it." He ran 70 miles a week to prepare for the role.

Strauss' fee for an ABC movie around this time was $200,000 a movie.

== Production ==
Mann secured permission to shoot in the prison itself. He recalls:

We were told by the warden that there'd be individual stabbings, and that happens routinely. But if there was a gang war or a race war, they'd throw us out and we couldn’t finish shooting. And we had 28 convicts in major roles in the picture. So I wanted to organize it in a way so that this wouldn't happen. So through Eddie Bunker, I was able to talk to people who ran M.A., the Black Guerrilla Family and also the Hells Angels. And Taft-Hartleyed about eight or nine of each group's guys to be actors in the film. And the deal I made with them, the quid pro quo, was that there can't be a gang war and there can't be a race war while we're in here. And so there still was violence around us. I thought that the actors would be terrified. I thought the crew would be OK, but the actors would be intimidated. It was just the other way around. The actors just kind of integrated with whoever they were playing.

Among the cast was a former convict turned playwright called Miguel Pinero, who Mann says was popular with the inmates.

"Here was Peter Strauss, a big star from Rich Man, Poor Man — but Pinero was the guy everyone wanted to meet," says the director. "Prisoners would bring him glasses of water with a napkin wrapped around it, so his fingers didn’t get wet—these small gestures of respect were their form of courtesy."

Strauss enjoyed working with Mann:

I just adore him. He is one of the finest directors I have ever worked with. If he asked me to do something that was the pits for me, I'd do it. Let's see... what would be the pits... Three's Company, I would do that for him. The Jericho Mile is not a film about prison or prison reform. There are no rape scenes in the shower, no banging of cups on dining room tables. It's a study of a human being who is at the lowest point of our social structure... to care about him... to find ways to create in him hope and expectation. It's one of the most extraordinary films I have ever made for TV.

== Reception ==
The Christian Science Monitor called it "a minor TV classic." The Los Angeles Times said it "has such scope, energy and potential, it should have been a theatrical feature." The New York Times praised its "outstanding performances."

The movie was the seventh-highest rating show of the week (the six higher ones were all regular series).

The film was released theatrically internationally with sales organised by ABC Pictures International. It was released in London by ITC on November 22, 1979 and grossed £9,599 in its opening week from 6 theaters.

== Awards ==
=== Won ===
- Emmy Awards 1979:
  - Outstanding Film Editing for a Limited Series or a Special: (Arthur Schmidt)
  - Outstanding Lead Actor in a Limited Series or a Special: (Peter Strauss)
  - Outstanding Writing in a Limited Series or a Special: (Patrick J. Nolan), (B.C.Meisenburg) & (Michael Mann)
- American Cinema Editors 1980:
  - Eddie Award - Best Edited Television Special: (Arthur Schmidt)
- Directors Guild of America 1980:
  - Outstanding Directorial Achievement in Specials for TV/Actuality: (Michael Mann)

=== Nominated ===
- Emmy Awards 1979:
  - Outstanding Drama or Comedy Special: (Tim Zinnemann)

== Influence ==
Research on the project led to material that resulted in Mann's theatrical debut feature Thief.

== See also ==
- List of films about the sport of athletics
