= William Wiard =

American film director

William Orphie Wiard
- Born: December 3, 1927; Santa Monica, Los Angeles, California, U.S.
- Died: July 3, 1987 (aged 59); Los Angeles, California, U.S.
- Occupation: Film director
- Years active: 1955–1985
- Spouse: Georgiana Judith Sherman (m. 1951)
- Children: 3

William Wiard (3 December 1927 – 3 July 1987) was an American film and television director. He directed over 150 episodes of television, several TV films, and the theatrical film Tom Horn.

== Life and work ==
William Orphie Wiard was born in Los Angeles and began his film career in 1955 as a sound editor for Dragnet. In the mid-1960s he moved on to directing.

Wiard was best known as a director of television westerns and detective shows, such as Mister Roberts, Get Smart, Daniel Boone, The High Chaparral, Room 222, Bonanza, M*A*S*H, The F.B.I., Barnaby Jones, Cannon, The Streets of San Francisco, The Rockford Files, Bret Maverick, Scarecrow and Mrs. King, and Spenser: For Hire.

From 1976 to 1986 he directed several television films in the horror and thriller genres, including Scott Free (1976) with Michael Brandon, When Walls Kill (1981) with Parker Stevenson, Help Wanted: Male (1982) with Suzanne Pleshette and Gil Gerard, High School Killer (1983) with Diane Franklin, and Kicks (1985) with Anthony Geary and Shelley Hack.

Though he worked mainly in television, Wiard also directed the theatrical film Tom Horn, starring Steve McQueen in one of his last roles.

Wiard was married to Georgiana Sherman, daughter of director George Sherman, they had three children. He died in Los Angeles of cancer at the age of 59.

== Selected filmography ==
=== Film ===
- 1980: Tom Horn

=== TV films ===
- 1976: Scott Free
- 1978: Ski Lift to Death
- 1980: The Girl, the Gold Watch & Everything
- 1981: This House Possessed
- 1981: The Seal
- 1982: Help Wanted: Male
- 1982: Fantasies
- 1983: Deadly Lessons
- 1985: Kicks
