= John Orchard =

English actor (1928–1995)

- Orchard as Ugly John in M*A*S*H
- Born: John Michael Charles Orchard; 15 November 1928; Kennington, London, England
- Died: 3 November 1995 (aged 66); Beckenham, Bromley, Greater London
- Occupation: Actor
- Known for: Ugly John Black in M*A*S*H
- Height: 6 ft 2 in (188 cm)
- Spouse: Carol Randall
- Children: 1

John Orchard (15 November 1928 – 3 November 1995) was an English actor. He is probably best remembered for playing Australian anesthesiologist "Ugly John" Black in the first season of M*A*S*H.

== Career ==
Orchard guest starred as Sgt. Walters on Hogan's Heroes Season 1 entitled "The Prisoner's Prisoner." He also played a heroin dealer in Mission: Impossible Season 2, and the minor character "Billet" in a guest spot in Hogan's Heroes Season 2 entitled "Klink's Rocket." Lastly, he appeared in the Hogan's Heroes season four episode, "My Favorite Prisoner," guest-starring as Captain Sears.

Orchard returned to M*A*S*H years after Ugly John was dropped from the series, albeit only once, playing Muldoon, an Australian non-commissioned officer and regular at Rosie's Bar who allowed the establishment to operate provided he received free liquor when he ordered "coffee." Major Winchester, who was tending bar in that episode, was unaware of this little game, and had the audacity to charge Muldoon for his drink, soon after which Rosie's was temporarily closed down.

Orchard also played a Kaos agent, Mr Snead (a take-off from The Avengers) on the season 3 Get Smart episode "Run Robot Run." He also was in an episode in the 2nd season of Mannix entitled "All Around the Money Tree."

== Personal life ==
He was married to Carol Randall, father to Sarah Orchard, and grandfather to Kayleigh and Jason Pennington.

Born in Kennington, London, Orchard lived in California from 1963 until 1977. He died in Beckenham, Bromley, in 1995.

== Partial filmography ==
- 1952 I Believe in You as Braxton
- 1952 The Gentle Gunman as Sentry (uncredited)
- 1956 The Feminine Touch as (uncredited)
- 1965 Strange Bedfellows as Radio Dispatcher
- 1965 King Rat as Gurble
- 1967 The Whisperers as Grogan
- 1968 The Thomas Crown Affair as John, Crown's Butler (uncredited)
- 1968 The Split as Guard (uncredited)
- 1968 Ice Station Zebra as Survivor
- 1970 The Molly Maguires as Man In Court Room (uncredited)
- 1970 The Revolutionary
- 1971 Raid on Rommel as Garth
- 1971 Bedknobs and Broomsticks as Portobello Vendor
- 1971 The Persuaders! as Gregor
- 1972 Madame Sin as Revolutionary
- 1972 Columbo: Dagger of the Mind as Country Constable
- 1973 Cleopatra Jones as British Agent (uncredited)
- 1973 That Man Bolt as Carter
- 1974 Hawaii Five-O as Joe Quillian
- 1975 Capone as Dean "Dion" O'Banion
- 1976 Gus as Pemberton Captain
- 1982 The Letter (TV film) as Annoyed Man
- 1985 Rustlers' Rhapsody as Town Sheriff (final film role)
