= Blind Man with a Pistol =

1969 novel by Chester Himes

Blind Man With a Pistol
- First edition
- Author: Chester Himes
- Series: Harlem Cycle
- Genre: Crime
- Published: 1969, William Morrow
- Pages: 192
- Preceded by: Cotton Comes to Harlem
- Followed by: Plan B

Blind Man With a Pistol is a 1969 fiction novel by Chester Himes. It is the 8th book in the Harlem Cycle series.

== Synopsis ==
It is summertime in the city of Harlem and Coffin Ed Johnson and Grave Digger Jones are both trying to keep peace in the city. They pursue two different cases in an attempt to keep the city from tearing itself apart.

== Sources ==
- Blind Man With a Pistol. Google Books. Retrieved 2/26/2014.
- Blind Man With a Pistol. Goodreads. Retrieved 2/26/2014.
