= Cotton Comes to Harlem (novel) =

1965 novel by Chester Himes

- First UK edition
- Author: Chester Himes
- Cover artist: Terrance Cummings
- Language: English
- Series: Harlem Detective
- Genre: Hardboiled crime fiction
- Publisher: G. P. Putnam's Sons (US); Muller (UK)
- Publication date: 1965
- Publication place: United States
- Media type: Print (paperback)
- Pages: 159 pp
- ISBN: 0-394-75999-0
- OCLC: 88040045
- Dewey Decimal: 813/.54
- LC Class: PS3515.I713 C68 1988
- Preceded by: The Big Gold Dream
- Followed by: The Heat's On

Cotton Comes to Harlem is a hardboiled crime fiction novel written by Chester Himes in 1965. It is the sixth and best known of the Harlem Detective series. It was later adapted into a film of the same name in 1970 starring Godfrey Cambridge, Raymond St. Jacques, and Redd Foxx.

== Plot ==
This novel begins with a Back-to-Africa rally, which is run by Reverend Deke O’Malley. The rally is interrupted by masked white hijackers who come armed to steal the collected money, which amounts to $87,000. There is a large amount of shooting, and one man is killed as the hijackers make their getaway with the money in a large truck.

An investigation is started to find the murderer, and the main characters, "Grave Digger" Jones and "Coffin Ed" Johnson, are summoned. Uncle Bud, a homeless junk collector, finds a bale of cotton that fell off the white hijackers’ get-away truck and eventually ends up selling it to a junkyard run by a man named Goodman. Reverend O’Malley is not who everyone thinks he is; Grave Digger and Coffin Ed know this and suspect that the whole Back-to-Africa movement is a cover for some kind of swindle. They question Iris, O’Malley's girlfriend, but get no answers and keep her under surveillance.

Colonel Robert Calhoun opens up his Back-to-the-Southland movement, asking the Black people of Harlem to come back South to make a living picking cotton. Deke hides out at the apartment of Mabel Hill, the widow to the man that was shot at the hijacking, believing that no one will try to locate him there. Meanwhile, Iris escapes the police surveillance, tracks O'Malley to Mabel's and catches Deke there wearing nothing but his underwear. During a catfight between Iris and Mabel, Iris gets hold of a gun and kills Mabel out of jealousy. Deke knocks Iris unconscious and escapes. Iris is arrested for Mabel's murder, but when she says she can prove Deke is a Confidence artist, Grave Digger and Coffin Ed agree to break her from jail to find where Deke is hiding. She ends up using them to get away instead.

Deke uses a henchman to arrange a meeting with Colonel Calhoun, who for some unknown reason is advertising for a bale of cotton. Josh, an employee at Goodman's junkyard, tells the Colonel he knows where the bale is. He agrees to bring the bale to the Colonel late at night. Deke has a secret meeting that goes wrong; the Colonel's henchmen are killed and everyone gets away except Deke. Josh is found dead and the bale of cotton is gone.

The ending of the novel displays great energy as Grave Digger and Coffin Ed use their wits to trick everyone into working against one another, while benefiting them. Iris finds Deke being held by his supposed accomplices, but gets tied up along with him. The henchmen holding them get into a boisterous fight with Grave Digger and Coffin Ed, and Deke and Iris are “rescued”. The bale of cotton is found with Iris's friend Billie, an exotic dancer using it in her act, and she sells it to the Colonel for $1,000. Grave Digger and Coffin Ed then arrest the colonel for the murder of Josh. The money is not in the bale, so Grave Digger and Coffin Ed make a deal with the colonel: the colonel will hand over $87,000 to pay back the money stolen from the Black citizens in return for Grave Digger and Coffin Ed looking the other way while the colonel and his henchmen "escape" from New York. The deal is made. After looking into the disappearance of the money, news comes in from Air France that Uncle Bud had taken a flight from New York to Dakar, Senegal; further inquiries reveal that Uncle Bud is living a life of luxury in the African bush, which seems to prove that he found and removed the stolen money before secretly selling the cotton bale to Billie.

== Characters ==
Grave Digger Jones - an ace black detective in Harlem working with Coffin Ed to find out who the hijackers are and get back the victims' money.

Coffin Ed Johnson - an ace black detective in Harlem working with Grave Digger to find out who the hijackers are and get back the victims' money as well. His face is scarred by acid thrown on him, giving him an explosive bad temper.

Reverend Deke O'Malley - a charismatic black leader and former convict, whose real name is Deke O'Hara; he uses religion as a disguise to swindle poor African-Americans out of their money for a Back-to-Africa movement.

Iris - Deke's main squeeze, a strong and cunning woman, who was in love with Deke. She is easily made angry and jealous, has a short temper, and can be considered the novel's femme fatale.

Uncle Bud - a homeless black man who finds the bale of cotton the $87,000 was hidden in after the heist, and who ultimately flees the country with it.

Mabel Hill - the attractive wife of one of O'Malley's henchmen who is killed at the Back-to-Africa rally; she is used by O'Malley for information, a place to stay, and sex. She is ultimately killed in a jealous rage by Iris.

Josh Bryce - a worker at Goodman's junkyard who tries to sell the bale of cotton to Col. Calhoun; he is ultimately killed when the Colonel believes he knows/saw too much.

Goodman - the owner of the junkyard where Uncle Bud originally sells the bale of cotton. He helps the detectives with clues as to where the bale could have ended up.

Lieutenant Anderson - he is in charge of the detective branch of the police precinct where Gravedigger and Coffin Ed work.

Colonel Calhoun - a wealthy southern white man with many high-up connections who planned the hijacking to steal the money. He also sets up a Back-to-South movement in the middle of Harlem, causes a ruckus, and tries to get the bale of cotton back unsuccessfully.

Billie - a mysterious lesbian friend of Iris and exotic dancer; she ends up with the bale of cotton from Uncle Bud to use in her dance routine, then sells the bale to Col. Calhoun for $1000.

Lo Boy - an ordinary con-man who worked with Early Riser (a gangster) on petty crimes; he's the main witness to the Hijacker vehicle crash.

== Themes ==
=== Role reversal ===
Coffin Ed and Grave Digger Jones’ roles as black police officers in a white-dominated and racist New York City precinct are treated in a unique way. Both detectives face racism, dealt to them from all sides, however they also wield significant power even though this is not typical of the time. Coffin Ed and Grave Digger Jones are the officers that patrol and take care of Harlem; this is not just as a job for them but arises from a strong feeling of commitment to its black population. This commitment shows in how they administer the law: cracking skulls and taking names to ensure that criminals are stopped and the innocent protected. Their white counterparts in the precinct see how they operate, and this earns them some respect, but more importantly power. The white officers feel that because of their brutal tactics and how they seem to follow their own law they should steer clear of them and not make racial comments. Perhaps a small amount of fear has been instilled into them. In the 1960s, the idea that a black officer could have more power or be feared by a white officer was a reversal of existing race relations.

=== Sexual deception ===
Sexual deception is manifest throughout the novel, and practiced by both races. For example, Reverend Deke O’Malley uses his power as a reverend to deceive Mabel. He visits Mabel at her home shortly after the death of her husband, who had been working under Deke for the Back-to-Africa movement. Deke starts off by saying how unfortunate the whole event was, and asks if he can help her in any way. He sees his opportunity as she is at her most vulnerable and lonely, and uses this to seduce her. A reverend comforting a recently widowed woman is not out of the norm, but Deke visited her to use her house as a base, and also to use her body, which is described as more than inviting. Also, Iris uses her feminine charm to deceive a police officer. While one of the white police officers is keeping watch on her, she decides to “have some fun” with him. She jokes about him being ugly, exploiting the man's poor self-image, and eventually strips down and seduces him, but requires him to wear a bag over his head. She makes a quick dash out of the apartment while he is naked and bagged, with him in hot pursuit. She loses him and he ends up locked out of the apartment. Iris has manipulated the cop into feeling uncomfortable about his masculinity, his looks, and his manhood. She uses her body to get what she wants, but finds that Deke is sexually deceiving her with Mabel. Iris is presented in an interesting way: a black woman surviving in a male-dominated society. Iris is strong in the sense that she fights and fights until she can't fight anymore, and even then she still tries. She gives the black detectives an extremely hard time while they are only trying to help her. She is strong and independent, not something typically seen in secondary characters during the 1960s, especially those that are black and female.

=== Poverty ===
The novel states that "Harlem is the city of the homeless"; Harlem was an all-white community until blacks were sent there and offered cheap living arrangements. In Cotton Comes to Harlem, the criminals must be made to pay for the crimes or the citizens should be able to afford better living arrangements. Poverty in the city is shown not just by the living standards, but in the number and type of crimes. In the book, the people of Harlem will even steal purses out of the back of a woman's dress, for what today is considered enough money to survive. In the journal article The Shape of Poverty in 1966 the author goes into specific detail about the living conditions at that time. It states that the "majority of the country” had better living standards than seven years ago in 1959, but there were actually 1 out of 7 people in America who were in "households with money incomes for the year lower than the poverty line". The novel displays this era, when there is a distinct difference between the Colonel and his white friends whose income could easily support spending on the Back-to-South movement, and Deke and the two detectives, who had to use impromptu means to support themselves. The crimes depicted in the novel show that drastic measures were needed at this time to reduce the constant poverty some suffered, but the characters do not stop fighting for what they believe in.

== Publication history ==
First published in France by Plon as Retour en Afrique (Back to Africa) in 1964. Published in the United States by Putnam in 1965. Himes originally titled it The Cops and the Cotton

== Critical reception ==
Himes is referred to as "the black Raymond Chandler" and "the father of the black crime fiction novel". This novel has also been described as a "rollicking funny book". The New York Times on February 5, 1965, says it has some weaknesses including sex exploitation and plot confusion, but has good, weird conceptions of the Back to Africa and Back to the South schemes and the plot of the bale of cotton. Since it was first published in France, the French seem to hold this level of violence as a true conception of Harlem during this time, but the Americans are a bit more reserved and disturbed. But some of his French readers "thought Black life in America was exciting". Also in February 1965, the Library Journal calls it the book to watch that month. They explain the humor as rough, sex rampant and dialogue authentic. They say it may shock some people with it being about a Harlem that has many junkies and some quiet people. And in the following month that year, Best Sellers says that “discriminating adults” can untwist the morality of the characters featured in Cotton Comes to Harlem. All the reviews during this time describe the book as something people should read, but none of them really seem to capture the essence of the time period it was in and how it was reflected. With the race riots going on all over the country, at least people still looked at this book as something good to read.

== Film adaptation ==
The book was adapted into a movie of the same name co-written by Ossie Davis and Arnold Perl, released on May 26, 1970. The cast includes Raymond St. Jacques and Godfrey Cambridge as Coffin Ed and Grave Digger Jones respectively, as well as Calvin Lockhart, Redd Foxx and Judy Pace. While staying true to the hard-boiled theme, the film does play into the blaxploitation that was a popular genre at the time. Chester Himes said he wanted the movie to focus more on Reverend Deke O’Malley, but the studio wanted it to “center on the Harlem policemen,” for purposes of a possible film franchise, according to an article in Jet magazine (the accuracy of which is somewhat called into question by a reference to "Cotton Ed Johnson." Ossie Davis planned on making multiple movies about the characters Grave Digger and Coffin Ed since there were already multiple books based on them. This difference in the movie enhances the humor to degrees that seem to exceed the acceptable amounts in real conversations and this causes the reception of the movie to be an overnight phenomenon.

The reviews at the time show different opinions of how viewers perceived the movie. Film critic Howard Thompson expresses gratitude for the movie as he is excited to say that the cast was “marvelous” and that the general plot of a “sly caper” that “tilts a neighborhood” is so excellent that it will be remembered for a long time. On the other hand, a disapproving review in the Times claims that the film is a “meretricious thriller that should offend the sensibilities of any audience—black or white”. These reviews may not be typical of every person who saw it at the time, but are understandable as an indication of some viewers' initial reaction to the racial jokes and blaxploitation, since this was only one of the first Black-featuring movies that started a craze later on in the 1970s.

== Radio ==
A four-part abridgement of the novel, read by Hugh Quarshie, was broadcast on BBC Radio 4 Extra December 17–20, 2012.

== See also ==
- Harlem Detective
- Cotton Comes to Harlem, film
- Back-to-Africa movement
- Femme fatale
- Ossie Davis
