= Bill Duke =

American actor and director (born 1943)

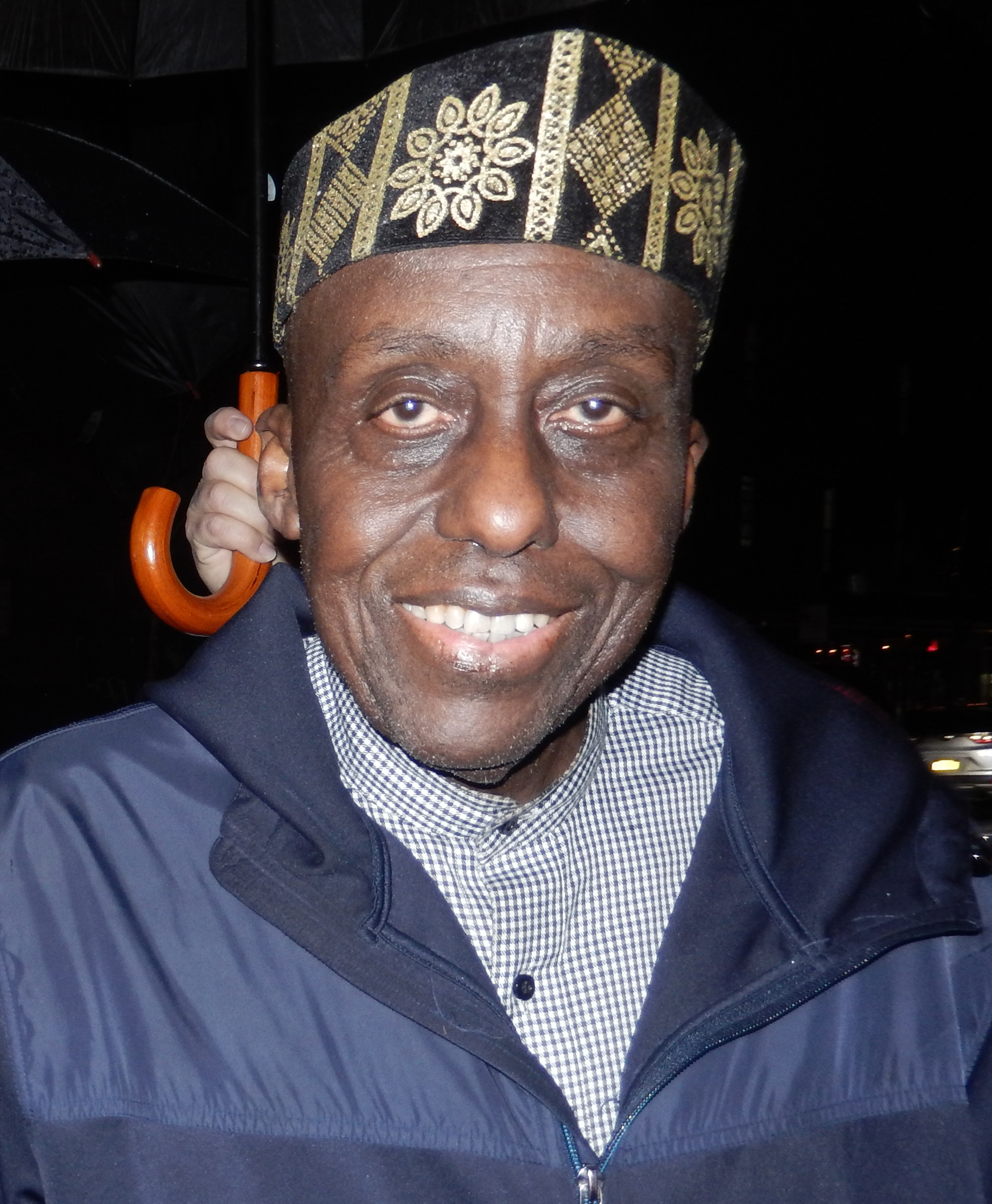
- Duke in 2019
- Born: William Henry Duke Jr. February 26, 1943 (age 83); Poughkeepsie, New York, U.S.
- Education: Boston University (BA)
- Occupations: Actor; director; producer
- Years active: 1971–present

William Henry Duke Jr. (born February 26, 1943) is an American actor and director. He is known for his work in action and crime drama, often as a character related to law enforcement. Dubbed the "Godfather of African American Cinema", he is known to direct films dealing with Black American experience and struggle.

Duke began his career as a theatre actor, before making his film debut in the ensembled comedy Car Wash (1976). Frequently a character actor, he starred in Commando (1985) and Predator (1987), alongside Arnold Schwarzenegger. He has appeared in films like American Gigolo (1980), Bird on a Wire (1990), Menace II Society (1993), Payback (1999), X-Men: The Last Stand (2006), and Mandy (2018). In television, he is best known as Agent Percy Odell in Black Lightning (2018–2021).

Duke's directorial debut was The Killing Floor (1984), which aired as an episode of American Playhouse and won the Special Jury Prize at the 1984 Sundance Film Festival. He directed a film adaptation of Chester Himes' Harlem Detective series, A Rage in Harlem (1991), which was nominated for the Cannes Film Festival's Palme d'Or. He also directed the neo-noir thriller Deep Cover (1992) and the musical comedy Sister Act 2 (1993). He has directed episodes of numerous television series including Cagney & Lacey, Dallas, Hill Street Blues, Miami Vice, and The Twilight Zone.

== Early life and education ==
Duke was born in Poughkeepsie, New York, the son of Ethel Louise (née Douglas) and William Henry Duke Sr. He attended Franklin D. Roosevelt High School in Hyde Park and later received his first instruction in the performing arts and in creative writing at Dutchess Community College in Poughkeepsie. Duke worked menial jobs seven days a week to cover his living expenses and intended to halt his education until Dr. James Hall, the first president of DCC, gave Duke a personal check to cover room, board and books for his next three years at Boston University, where (Duke) had secured an academic-based scholarship, intending to pursue medical school after graduation, to please his parents. He later switched to English Education and then instruction in dance and drama for the completion of his B.A.

After graduating, Duke went on to study at New York University's Tisch School of the Arts, and appeared on Broadway in the 1971 Melvin Van Peebles musical Ain't Supposed to Die a Natural Death. With acting roles difficult to come by, Duke next attended AFI Conservatory to study filmmaking.

== Career ==
=== Film ===
Duke first became a familiar face to moviegoers in Car Wash (1976), where he portrayed fierce young Black Muslim revolutionary Abdullah Mohammed Akbar (formerly known as Duane). He expanded his repertoire with American Gigolo (1980), where he played a gay pimp, who co-orchestrates a murder, pinned on star Richard Gere.

As the action-film-oriented genre became more popular, Duke portrayed a string of tough guys. He worked opposite Arnold Schwarzenegger with a small role in Commando. Then he acted alongside Schwarzenegger, Carl Weathers and Jesse Ventura in the scifi action thriller Predator, followed by a role as a police chief in the 1988 Carl Weathers vehicle Action Jackson. Duke appeared uncredited as a DEA officer in The Limey (1999), as well as a police chief opposite Steven Seagal in Exit Wounds. In Menace II Society (1993), he played a police investigator who tricks the main character into contradicting himself during an interrogation.. He played a corrupt law enforcement agent in two films opposite Mel Gibson—Bird on a Wire (as an FBI agent) and Payback (as a police detective). Duke appeared as Trask in X-Men: The Last Stand, Washington in National Security, Levar in Get Rich or Die Tryin', Nokes in Bad Country and Caruthers in Mandy.

=== Directing ===
In the early 1980s, Duke accidentally secured a directing job on Knots Landing, due to a secretarial or clerical error at AFI Conservatory. However, the producers were pleased with his work, and he was kept on, eventually directing 10 episodes of the show. This made him one of the first four black television directors. Duke then directed episodes of Knots Landing's mother show Dallas and its sister show Falcon Crest (6 episodes). Next came action and cop shows Hill Street Blues, Miami Vice and Starman. He credits the benevolence and humanity of people like Larry Hagman and Jane Wyman for his early TV directing success, while he occasionally heard derogatory remarks, and even racial slurs, from crew members, including the Teamsters.

Duke directed the TV movie The Killing Floor in 1984. He began directing theatrical films in the 1990s with crime dramas A Rage in Harlem (1991), Deep Cover (1992) and Hoodlum (1997). He also directed The Cemetery Club (1993) and the Whoopi Goldberg comedy sequel Sister Act 2: Back in the Habit (1993).

For television, Duke directed the A&E Network original film, The Golden Spiders: A Nero Wolfe Mystery (2000). In 2007 he directed the historical reenactments in the award-winning PBS-broadcast documentary Prince Among Slaves.

Duke teamed with screenwriter Bayard Johnson to co-produce Cover, a 2007 film which explores the HIV epidemic.

He is set to direct The Power of One: The Diane Latiker Story, a film based on Chicago activist Diane Latiker.

=== Television ===
Duke made an appearance on Kojak in 1976, as Sylk in the episode "Bad Dude", in the third season of the series. He guest-starred in the fourth episode of Lost in its third season as Warden Harris, in the episode "Every Man for Himself".

Duke had a starring role in the short-lived TV series Palmerstown, U.S.A., produced by Norman Lear and Roots author, Alex Haley. Although the series was critically acclaimed and won an Emmy, it ran for only 17 episodes in the 1980–81 television season.

He guest-starred in Battlestar Galactica remake in 2004, the season two episode "Black Market".

Duke was cast as recurring character Capt. Parish in the action television series/crime drama Fastlane. He made a guest appearance on Baisden After Dark in the episode broadcast on July 18, 2008 and guest-starred on Cold Case as Grover Boone, a corrupt politician, in the 2008 episode "Street Money". Duke voiced a detective in the episode "Thank You for Not Snitching" of the animated television series The Boondocks. The character and his entire scene were references to Menace II Society. Duke appears in Busta Rhymes' music video "Dangerous". Duke also appears in an episode of Law & Order: Special Victims Unit as a lawyer. In May 2017, Duke appeared on episode 6 of the first season of the Outdoor Channel show Hollywood Weapons: Fact or Fiction?. Duke discussed with host Terry Schappert his time filming Predator, his character Sgt. Mac Elliot, and what it was like to fire an M134 Minigun.

In 2018, Duke joined the second season of The CW superhero drama series Black Lightning as recurring character Agent Percy Odell, a dedicated A.S.A. government official.

=== Other work ===
He has served on the board of trustees of the American Film Institute, as a member of the California Film Commission board, appointed by Governor Schwarzenegger, in the Time Warner Endowed Chair in the Department of Radio Television and Film at Howard University in Washington, D.C., and as a member of the National Endowment for the Humanities, appointed by President Bill Clinton.

In 2011 he directed the documentary Dark Girls, which was nominated for an NAACP Award, followed by 2015's Light Girls.

Duke is also the founder and owner of the Duke Media Foundation, which helps prepare young people for a career in all aspects of film, video and TV production.

He became a teacher of Transcendental Meditation in Ethiopia in 1973 under the guidance of Maharishi Mahesh Yogi.

== Personal life ==
He is an honorary member of the Phi Beta Sigma fraternity.

In honor of his accomplishments in the film industry, he has a street named after him, Bill Duke Way, also known as Fallkill Avenue, in Poughkeepsie. The renaming ceremony took place on May 16, 2025 in his home town.

== Filmography ==
=== Film ===
Year	Title	Role	Notes
1976	Car Wash	Duane / Abdullah Mohammed Akbar	
1980	American Gigolo	Leon James	
1985	Commando	Cooke	
1987	Predator	Sergeant Mac Eliot	
1987	No Man's Land	Malcolm	
1988	Action Jackson	Captain Earl Armbruster	
1989	Street of No Return	Lieutenant Borel	
1990	Bird on a Wire	FBI Agent Albert "Diggs" Diggins	
1993	Menace II Society	Detective	
1993	Sister Act 2: Back in the Habit	Mr. Johnson	Also director
1998	Susan's Plan	Detective Scott	
1999	Payback	Detective Hicks	
1999	Foolish	Studio Producer	
1999	The Limey	Head DEA Agent	
1999	Fever	Detective Glass	
2001	Never Again	Earl	
2001	Exit Wounds	Chief Hinges	
2002	Love and a Bullet	Mysterious Voice on Phone	
2002	Red Dragon	Police Chief	
2003	National Security	Lieutenant Washington	
2005	Get Rich or Die Tryin	Levar Cahill	
2006	X-Men: The Last Stand	Secretary Trask	
2006	Yellow	Miles Emory	
2007	The Go-Getter	Liquor	
2009	Level 26: Dark Origins	Jack Mitchell	Short
2010	Henry's Crime	Frank	
2010	The Big Bang	Drummer	
2012	Freaky Deaky	Wendell Robinson	
2014	Bad Country	John Nokes	
2016	Restored Me	Officer Brantley	
2016	Beyond the Silence	District Attorney Adam Stevenson	
2017	American Satan	Gabriel	
2018	Mandy	Caruthers	
2018	Clipped Wings, They Do Fly	District Attorney Adam Stevenson	
2019	High Flying Bird	Spence	
2019	Hollow Point	Senior Guard James	
2021	No Sudden Move	Aldrick Watkins	
2021	The Vandal	Harold	Short
2022	In Search of Tomorrow	Himself	Documentary

=== Television ===
Year	Title	Role	Notes
1972–1975	ABC Afterschool Specials	Mr. Sands	Episode: "Santiago's Ark" & "Santiago's America"
1976	Kojak	Sylk	Episode: "Bad Dude"
1976	On the Rocks	-	Episode: "High Noon"
1978	Starsky & Hutch	Officer Dryden	Episode: "Hutchinson for Murder One"
1978	Charlie’s Angels	David Pearl	Episode: "Angels on the Run"
1978	Love Is Not Enough	"Happy" Jordan	TV movie
1978	Sergeant Matlovich vs. the U.S. Air Force	Sergeant Langford	TV movie
1980–1981	Palmerstown, U.S.A.	Luther Freeman	Main cast
1981	Benson	Mad-Dog	Episode: "The Grass Ain't Greener"
1986	Dallas: The Early Years	Seth Foster	TV movie
1987	Starman	Steven Putnam	Episode: "The System"
1989	American Playhouse	FBI Agent #2	Episode: "The Meeting"
1994	New York Undercover	Hitman	Episode: "Pilot"
1998	Biography	The Narrator	Episode: "Nat King Cole: Loved in Return"
1998	Always Outnumbered	"Blackbird" Wills	TV movie
2002	Justice League	Detective (voice)	Episode: "The Brave and the Bold"
2002–2003	Fastlane	Captain Bob Parish	Recurring cast
2003–2004	Karen Sisco	Amos Andrews	Main cast
2006	Battlestar Galactica	Phelan	Episode: "Black Market"
2006	Lost	Warden Harris	Episode: "Every Man for Himself"
2007	The Boondocks	Detective (voice)	Episode: "Thank You for Not Snitching"
2008	Cold Case	Grover Boone '05/'08	Episode: "Street Money"
2008	My Own Worst Enemy	Serge Khabako	Episode: "Love in All the Wrong Places"
2011	Chaos	General Margolis	Episode: "Core Fortitude"
2013	Battledogs	President Donald Sheridan	TV movie
2015	Between	Gord's Father	Episode: "End of the Rope"
2016	Law & Order: Special Victims Unit	Ed Pastrino	Episode: "Intersecting Lives" & "Heartfelt Passages"
2018–2021	Black Lightning	Agent Percy Odell	Recurring cast (season 2-3), guest (season 4)
2020	Ghost Tape	Byron Dixon	Main cast
2021	The Oval	Curtis	Episode: "Like a Boss" & "Doomsday"
2022	Gaslit	Charles Anderson	Episode: "California"
2026	Diarra from Detroit	Freemason leader	Episode: "The Initiated"

=== Films directed ===
Year	Title	Notes
1984	The Killing Floor	
1989	A Raisin In The Sun	
1991	A Rage in Harlem	
1992	Deep Cover	
1993	The Cemetery Club	
1993	Sister Act 2: Back in the Habit	
1996	America's Dream	
1997	Hoodlum	Also a producer
2000	The Golden Spiders: A Nero Wolfe Mystery	
2001	Angel: One More Road to Cross	
2003	Deacons for Defense	
2007	Cover	Also a producer
2009	Not Easily Broken	
2011	Dark Girls	Also a producer
2017	Created Equal	
