= Jonelle Allen =

American actress, singer, and dancer

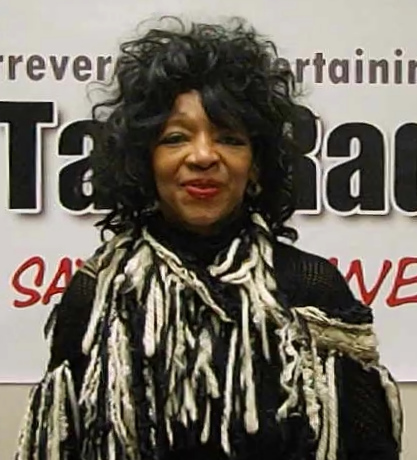
- Jonelle R. Allen in 2016
- Born: July 8, 1948 (age 78); New York City, New York, U.S.
- Education: Professional Children's School
- Occupations: Actress; singer; dancer
- Years active: 1967–present
- Spouses: John Sharpe (m. 1978; div. 1992) Richard Grimmon (m. 1998; div. 2001) Leigh Eaton (m. 2003; died 2020)

Jonelle R. Allen (born July 8, 1948) is an American actress, singer, and dancer. Beginning her professional career in the late 1960s, Allen has co-starred in films, Broadway productions, and television. In 1972, Allen was nominated for a Tony Award for Best Actress in a Musical for her performance in the musical Two Gentlemen of Verona. She appeared in films such as Come Back Charleston Blue (1972) and The River Niger (1976) and was a regular cast member in television series Generations (1989–1991) and Dr. Quinn, Medicine Woman (1993–1998).

== Early life and education ==
Born in New York City, Allen was raised in the Sugar Hill section of Harlem. The only child of Marion, a postal worker, and Robert Allen, a NYC transit worker, Allen began performing at the age of four, and attended the Professional Children's School. As a child, she made regular appearances on a local children's television series, The Merry Mailman, hosted by Ray Heatherton.

== Career ==
Allen made her Broadway debut at the age of six in The Wisteria Trees, Joshua Logan's Americanized adaptation of The Cherry Orchard, starring Helen Hayes. Allen returned to Broadway in a revival of Finian's Rainbow. She was in the cast of the original off-Broadway 1968 production of Hair at Joseph Papp's Public Theater, and also appeared in George M! before receiving critical acclaim and a Tony Award nomination for Two Gentlemen of Verona, which earned her New York Drama Critics' Circle, Drama Desk, Theatre World, and Outer Critics Circle Awards for her performance. Despite her success, it proved to be her last Broadway appearance to date.

Allen's film credits include Cotton Comes to Harlem, The Hotel New Hampshire, and The River Niger, for which she won an NAACP Image Award. Other television appearances include Match Game, Barney Miller, The Love Boat, All in the Family, Trapper John, M.D., Hill Street Blues, Cagney and Lacey, ER, and Girlfriends. Allen portrayed a lesbian prison inmate in the 1975 television movie Cage Without a Key, which starred Susan Dey.

Her most notable roles are Grace, the entrepreneurial café owner in the Old West, that she played for seven years on Dr. Quinn, Medicine Woman, as well as the flamboyant and outspoken Doreen Jackson on the NBC soap opera Generations, and Lucinda Cavender, the vampire witch in the horror comedy film The Midnight Hour. Before Generations, she played ambitious salesgirl-turned-boutique-manager Stacey Russell on the short-lived prime-time soap Berrenger's. Allen appeared as legendary Harlem jazz queen Florence Mills in Harlem Renaissance at the 2007 Edinburgh Festival Fringe.

More recently, Allen has headed the New Works/Staged Reading Projects at Saddleback College, and is writing and directing new shows which Allen calls "plays with music", which have been presented at Saddleback, notably an adaptation of Charles Dickens' A Christmas Carol and The Journey, both with composer David Jayden Anthony. In 2017, Allen appeared in the film The Divorce, released on Amazon, and starred in Hello, Dolly! at Saddlebacks CLO. The same year, she starred in Donald B. Welch's Secret Garden and worked on an updated version of her Florence Mills one-woman show, written with collaborators Stevi Meredith and David Jayden Anthony.

In 2020, Allen appeared as Felicia Richardson in the serial drama Forever and a Day. Originally starting as a recurring character, by season three Allen became a main character in the audio drama.

== Personal ==
Allen has been married three times. She was married to John Sharpe on December 19, 1978, divorcing in 1992. Then she was married to Richard Grimmon from January 9, 1998 until 2001. Most recently she was married to Leigh Eaton from 2003 until his death in 2020.

== Filmography ==
Year	Film	Role	Notes
1970	Cotton Comes to Harlem	Secretary	
1970	The Cross and the Switchblade	Bishop Deb	
1972	Come Back, Charleston Blue	Carol	
1974	Wide World Mystery	Eva	Episode: 'Legacy of Blood'
1974	Police Woman	Laurette Blake/Maxine	Played Laurette in the 1974 episode 'The End Game' & played Maxine in the 1975 episode 'Above & Beyond'
1975	Cage Without a Key	Tommy	
1975	Foster and Laurie	Jacqueline Foster	
1975	Barney Miller	Officer Turner	Episode: 'Hot Dogs'
1975	Police Story	Mary Sue/Merrily Goodwin	Played Mary Sue in the episode 'The Execution' & played Merrily in the episode 'The Company Man'
1976	The American Woman: Portraits of Courage	Rosa Parks	
1976	The River Niger	Ann Vanderguild	
1976	Joe Forrester		Episode: 'The Boy Next Door'
1978	What's Happening!!	Love-is-Life	Episode: 'Rerun Sees the Light"
1978	The Love Boat	Andrea Martin	Episode: 'Gopher the Rebel/Cabin Fever/Pacific Princess Overture'
1978	All in the Family	Marabel	Episode: 'Archie's Other Wife'
1979	The White Shadow	Shelley	Episode: 'Airball'
1979	Vampire	Brandy	
1980	Brave New World	Fanny Crowne	
1980	Palmerstown, U.S.A.	Bessie Freeman	Appeared in 11 episodes, 1980–1981
1982	Victims	Maydene Jariott	
1982	Trapper John, M.D.		Episode: 'Medicine Man'
1983	Cagney & Lacey	Elizabeth Carter/Claudia Petrie	Played Elizabeth in the 1983 episode 'Open & Shut Case' & played Claudia in the 1984 episode 'A Killer's Dozen'
1984	Hill Street Blues	Linda Talbot	Episode: 'The Count of Monty Tasco'
1984	The Hotel New Hampshire	Sabrina	
1985	Berrenger's	Stacey Russell	
1985	The Midnight Hour	Lucinda Cavender	
1986	The Penalty Phase	Susan Jansen	
1987	The Hitchhiker	Sunny	Episode: 'Made for Each Other'
1987	Werewolf	Emily	Episode: 'Big Daddy'
1989	Generations	Doreen Jackson	
1992	The Royal Family	Nina Martin	Episode: 'The Big Stink'. Episode was never aired.
1992	Grave Secrets: The Legacy of Hilltop Drive	Madeline Garrick	
1993	Dr. Quinn, Medicine Woman	Grace	Appeared in 106 episodes, 1993–1998
1997	The Eddie Files	Eddie's Music Teacher	Episode: 'Patterns: The Big Concert'
1998	Next Time	Evelyn	
1999	Blues for Red	Dora	
1999	Dr. Quinn, Medicine Woman: The Movie	Grace	
1999	Twice in a Lifetime	Dr. Grace Grant-Heistings, M.D./Nurse Daisy Bradford	Episode: 'Healing Touch'
2000	ER	Debbie Marlin	Episodes: 'Foreign Affairs' & 'Rescue Me'
2001	Flossin	Viola	
2002	Strong Medicine	Connie	Episode: 'Stages'
2003	Mr. Barrington	Mother Anne	
2005	As Seen on TV	Shauna	
2007	Girlfriends	Eleanor	Episode: 'Operation Does She Yield'
2008	Float	Madge	
2016	American Crime Story	Mom Darden	2 Episodes
2017	Shameless	Helen Cardinal	Episode: 'Where's My Meth?'
2018	Boomers	Yvette	Episode: 'The Gig'
2021	9-1-1	Ellen Saxton	Episode: 'Parenthood'
2022	Bust Down	Dolores	Episode: 'Won't He Do It'
