= Godfrey Cambridge =

American actor and comedian (1933–1976)

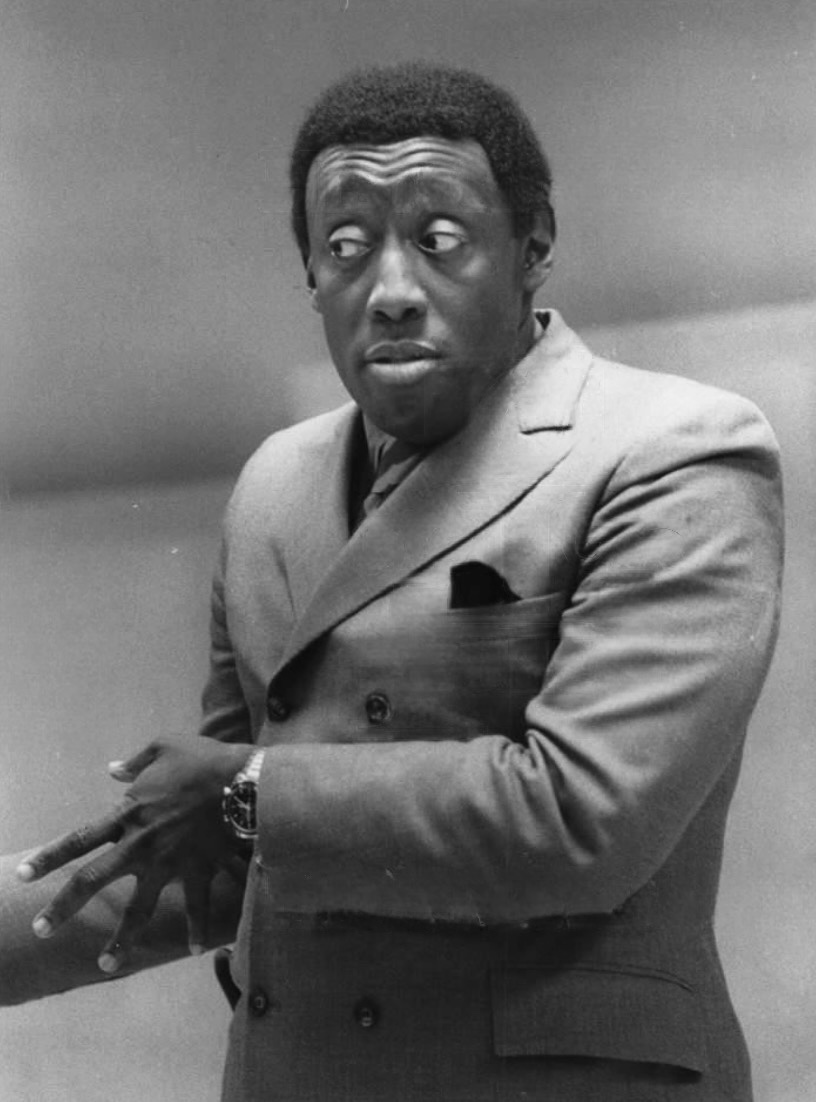
- Cambridge in 1970
- Born: Godfrey MacArthur Cambridge; February 26, 1933; New York City, U.S.
- Died: November 29, 1976 (aged 43); Burbank, California, U.S.
- Resting place: Forest Lawn Memorial Park (Hollywood Hills), Los Angeles; 34.14522°N 118.3219°W
- Education: Hofstra University (attended); City College of New York (attended)
- Occupations: Actor, stand-up comedian
- Notable work: Watermelon Man (1970); Cotton Comes to Harlem (1970)
- Spouses: Barbara Ann Teer (1962–1965); Audriano Meyers (1972–1976)
- Children: 2

Comedy career
- Years active: 1957–1976
- Medium: Stage and screen

Godfrey MacArthur Cambridge (February 26, 1933 – November 29, 1976) was an American stand-up comic and actor. Alongside Bill Cosby, Dick Gregory, and Nipsey Russell, he was acclaimed by Time in 1965 as "one of the country's foremost celebrated Negro comedians."

== Early life ==
Cambridge was born in New York City on February 26, 1933, to Alexander and Sarah Cambridge, who were immigrants from British Guiana. His parents, dissatisfied with the New York Public School System, sent him to live with his grandparents in Sydney, Nova Scotia, Canada, during his primary school years. When he was 13, Cambridge moved back to New York and attended Flushing High School in Flushing, Queens.

In 1949, Cambridge studied medicine at Hofstra College, which he attended for three years before dropping out to pursue a career in acting.

== Stage and screen career ==
While pursuing an acting career, Cambridge supported himself with a variety of jobs, including "cab driver, bead-sorter, ambulance driver, gardener, judo instructor, and clerk for the New York City Housing Authority," as well as cleaning airplanes and making popcorn bunnies.

His first role was as a bartender in the Off-Broadway play Take a Giant Step. In 1961, he received an Obie award for distinguished performance for his role in Jean Genet's The Blacks, in a cast that also included James Earl Jones, Louis Gossett, Cicely Tyson, Maya Angelou and Raymond St. Jacques. He made his Broadway debut in the original production of Herman Wouk's 1957 play Nature's Way.

Cambridge received a 1962 Tony Award nomination as part of the original cast of Purlie Victorious, a play written by and starring Ossie Davis. He featured in an opening-night cast that included Ruby Dee, Alan Alda, Sorrell Booke, Roger C. Carmel, Helen Martin, and Beah Richards.

Godfrey's memorable film roles include The Last Angry Man (1959), in which he played a character called "Nobody Home", The President's Analyst (1967), where he plays a depressed government agent, and Watermelon Man (1970), in which he played the lead character, a white bigot who one day wakes up and discovers his skin color has turned black. On one of his comedy LPs, Cambridge ruefully noted he did not get the lead role in King of Kings, calling it "a marketing problem".

In 1970, he had a starring role in the 1970 Ossie Davis adaptation of the Chester Himes novel Cotton Comes to Harlem, and its 1972 sequel, Come Back, Charleston Blue. Cambridge made an appearance in director Sidney Lumet's Bye Bye Braverman (1968) as a Yiddish speaking NYC cab driver involved in a car collision with the main protagonists, and another as a gay underworld figure in the 1975 film Friday Foster. His other film appearances included roles in The Busy Body (1967), The Biggest Bundle of Them All (1968), The Biscuit Eater (1972), Beware! The Blob (1972), and Whiffs (1975).

He hosted, financed, and produced Dead is Dead (1973), a drug-awareness film. It gave an uncensored look at the downside of drug abuse, showing actual addicts injecting drugs and going through withdrawal.

Cambridge appeared on several network television programs, including Car 54 Where Are You? ("The Curse of the Snitkins"), The Dick Van Dyke Show ("The Man From My Uncle"), I Spy ("Court of the Lion"), The Monkees ("It's a Nice Place to Visit"), and Police Story ("Year of the Dragon"). He also had a small speaking part as a member of Sgt. Bilko's platoon in The Phil Silvers Show, 1957 episode "Boys Town". Cambridge gave an acclaimed performance alongside Tom Bosley in the episode "Make Me Laugh" of Rod Serling's Night Gallery, a story about a failed comedian who looks to a genie for a quick fix to success; the episode was directed by Steven Spielberg. He perhaps reached his largest television audience in a series of comical commercials for Jockey brand underwear.

He later appeared in Jean Genet's The Blacks: A Clown Show, giving a performance that earned him an Obie Award in 1961. Four years later he did a stock version of A Funny Thing Happened on the Way to the Forum.

== Stand-up comedy ==
I am only concerned with letting people see the truth of our lives, like, for example, the way Negroes are afraid of each other too. We have got to show the common bonds. I have an act about people staring at a Negro in the Safeway. I want people to realize that they really do stare. We must bring things out into the open. There are some people you can't reach. You neutralize this kind. If two men are laughing at each other, nobody gets stabbed."

— Cambridge in February 1965, on his stand-up act.

In addition to acting, Cambridge had major success as a stand-up comedian. By 1965 he was earning "as much as $4,000 a week...in all respects a headliner, working the best places, such as San Francisco's Hungry i and Hollywood's Crescendo." He appeared on The Tonight Show and was introduced by his favorite actress Joan Crawford on The Hollywood Palace.

His routines were imbued with biting sarcasm and the trenchant topical humor that was common in comedic circles at the time. He was noted for comic lapses from standard American English to African American English.

=== Discography ===
- 1964 Here's Godfrey Cambridge, Ready or Not... Epic Records FLM 13101 (mono); FLM 15101 (stereo) (No. 42 US)
- 1965 Them Cotton Pickin' Days Is Over Epic Records FLM 13102 (mono); FLM 15102 (stereo) (No. 142 US)
- 1966 Godfrey Cambridge Toys With The World Epic Records FLM 13108 (mono); FLM 15108 (stereo)
- 1968 The Godfrey Cambridge Show: Recorded Live At The Aladdin, Las Vegas Epic Records FLM 13115 (mono); FLM 15115 (stereo)

== Personal life ==
Cambridge, along with writer Maya Angelou and actor Hugh Hurd, organized one of the first benefits for Martin Luther King Jr. held in New York City. According to Angelou, it was held at the Village Gate in the late 1950s and raised $9,000 for King's civil rights movement. On his 1964 album Ready Or Not, Cambridge joked he was supporting Barry Goldwater, saying that the GOP presidential nominee had "come flat out against slavery...in principle!".

Cambridge married actress Barbara Ann Teer in 1962; the couple divorced three years later. During the 1970s he remained in semi-retirement, making few public appearances and marrying Audriano Meyers in 1972.

== Death ==
Cambridge died of a heart attack on November 29, 1976, at the age of 43, while on the Burbank, California, set of the ABC television movie Victory at Entebbe, in which he was to portray Idi Amin. He was replaced by Julius Harris. Amin commented that Cambridge's death was "punishment from God." He is interred at Forest Lawn Memorial Park in the Hollywood Hills area of Los Angeles.

== Filmography ==
Year	Title	Role	Notes
1959	The Last Angry Man	Nobody Home	Uncredited
1961	Splendor in the Grass	Chauffeur	Uncredited
1963	Gone Are the Days!	Gitlow Judson	
1964	The Troublemaker	Fire Inspector	
1966	"The Man from My Uncle"	Harry Bond	Episode of The Dick Van Dyke Show
1967	The Busy Body	Mike	
1967	The President's Analyst	Don Masters	
1968	The Biggest Bundle of Them All	Benjamin 'Benny' Brownstead	
1968	Bye Bye Braverman	Taxi Driver	
1970	Cotton Comes to Harlem	Gravedigger Jones	
1970	Watermelon Man	Jeff Gerber	
1971	"Make Me Laugh/Clean Kills and Other Trophies"	Jackie Slater	Episode of Night Gallery
1972	The Biscuit Eater	Willie Dorsey	
1972	Beware! The Blob	Chester Hargis	
1972	Come Back Charleston Blue	Gravedigger Jones	
1973	Five on the Black Hand Side	Himself	
1975	Whiffs	Dusty	
1975	Friday Foster	Ford Malotte	
1977	Scott Joplin	Tom Turpin	Posthumous
