= Demond Wilson =

American actor (1946–2026)

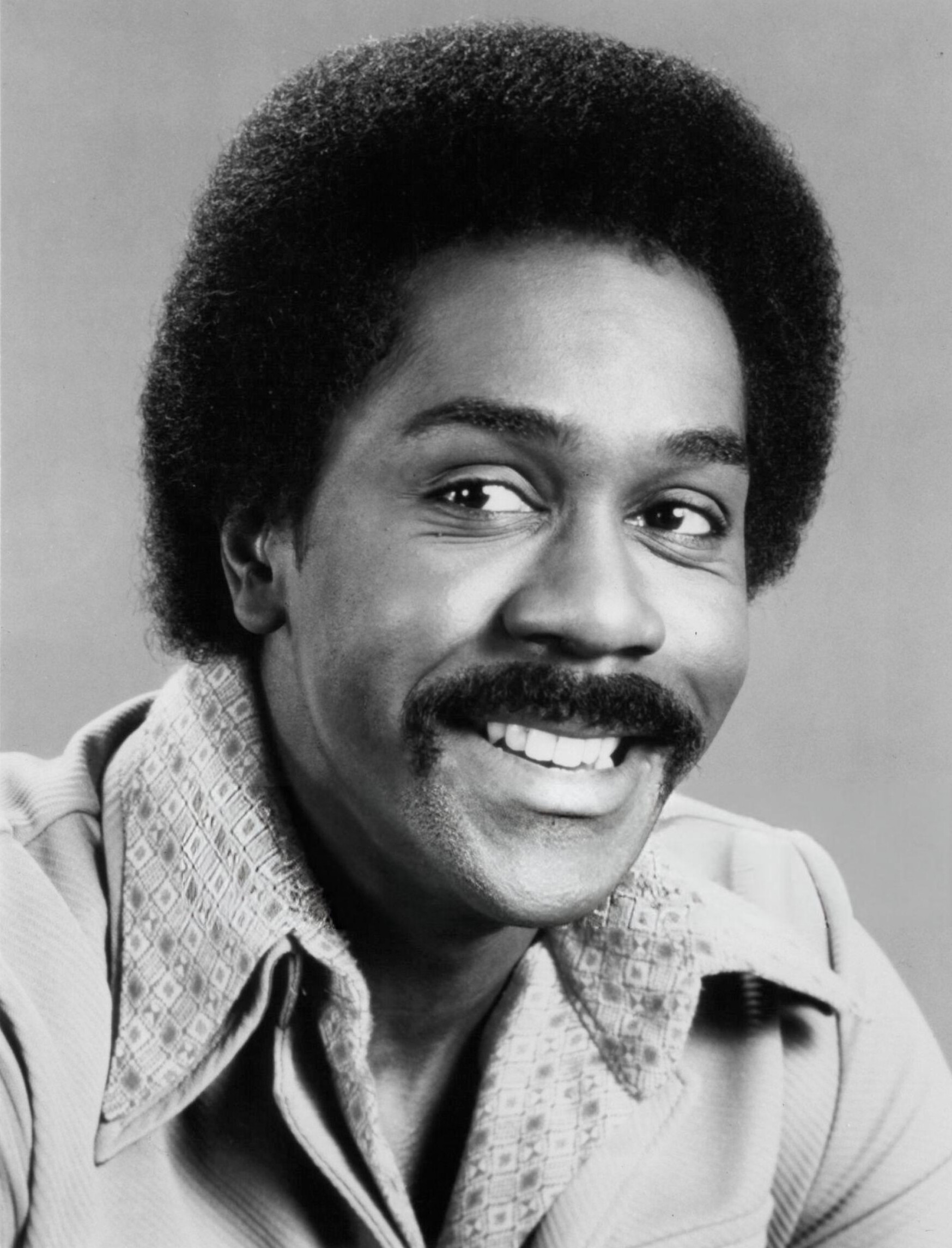
- Wilson in 1982
- Born: Grady Demond Wilson; October 13, 1946; Valdosta, Georgia, U.S.
- Died: January 30, 2026 (aged 79); Palm Springs, California, U.S.
- Occupation: Actor
- Years active: 1968–2023
- Spouse: Cicely Johnston (m. 1974)
- Children: 6
- Military career
- Allegiance: United States
- Branch: United States Army
- Service years: 1966–1968
- Units: 4th Infantry Division
- Conflicts: Vietnam War
- Awards: Combat Infantry Badge; Bronze Star Medal; Purple Heart
- Website: demondwilson.org

Grady Demond Wilson (October 13, 1946 – January 30, 2026) was an American actor, best known for his role as Lamont, the titular son in the NBC sitcom Sanford and Son (1972–1977). He later portrayed Oscar Madison on The New Odd Couple (1982–1983) and appeared in the film Me and the Kid (1993).

== Early life and career ==
Wilson was born in Valdosta, Georgia, on October 13, 1946, and grew up in New York City, where he studied tap dance and ballet. He made his Broadway debut at age four and danced at Harlem's Apollo Theater at age 12. Wilson was raised as a Catholic and served as an altar boy. He would spend summers with his grandmother Ada Mitchell, who was Pentecostal. Wilson briefly considered becoming a Catholic priest. When Wilson was about 12 years old, his appendix ruptured, almost killing him, but he vowed to serve God as an adult in some ministerial capacity.

He served in the United States Army from 1966 to 1968 and was in the 4th Infantry Division in Vietnam, where he was wounded. Upon returning home in the late 1960s, Wilson was featured in several Broadway and off-Broadway stage productions before moving to Hollywood, where he performed guest roles on several television series such as Mission: Impossible and All in the Family and acted in films such as The Organization (1971) and Dealing: Or the Berkeley-to-Boston Forty-Brick Lost-Bag Blues (1972).

=== Sanford and Son (1972–1977) and other acting projects ===
Later in 1971, after appearing as a robber on All in the Family with Cleavon Little, Wilson won the role of Lamont Sanford in the NBC sitcom Sanford and Son; this series was also made by All In The Family producers Norman Lear and Bud Yorkin. Johnny Brown was considered for that role, but because of his commitment to Laugh-In, Wilson got the role instead. Wilson played Lamont through the run of the series, and became the star when Redd Foxx walked off the show in 1974 over a salary dispute with the producers and his character was written out for the rest of the season. Foxx returned the following year, and the pair worked together until 1977 when the show was cancelled. After Foxx's departure from Sanford and Son, Wilson would be offered to lead the series, but declined. In 1980–1981, Foxx attempted to revive the show with the short-lived sitcom Sanford, but Wilson refused to reprise his role for the new series.

When asked in 2014 if he kept in touch with anybody from Sanford & Son, especially Foxx (who died on October 11, 1991), he responded:

No. I saw Redd Foxx once before he died, circa 1983, and I never saw him again. At the time I was playing tennis at the Malibu Racquet Club and I was approached by some producers about doing a Redd Foxx 50th Anniversary Special. I hadn't spoken to him since 1977, and I called the club where (Redd) was playing. And we met at Redd's office, but he was less than affable. I told those guys it was a bad idea. I never had a cross word with him. People say I'm protective of Redd Foxx in my book (Second Banana, Wilson's memoir of the Sanford years). I had no animosity toward Foxx (for quitting the show in 1977) because I had a million dollar contract at CBS to do Baby... I'm Back!. My hurt was that he didn't come to me about throwing the towel in—I found out in the hallway at NBC from a newscaster. I forgave him and I loved Redd, but I never forgot that. The love was there. You can watch any episode and see that.

Wilson also appeared in the films Full Moon High (1981), Me and the Kid (1993), and Hammerlock (2000).

=== Baby... I'm Back! (1978), and The New Odd Couple (1982–1983) ===
Wilson later starred as Raymond Ellis in the short-lived CBS comedy series Baby... I'm Back! and as Oscar Madison, opposite actor Ron Glass (who co-starred as Felix Ungar) in the ABC sitcom The New Odd Couple, a revamped black version of the 1970–75 series The Odd Couple on the same network which starred Jack Klugman and Tony Randall, which was in turn based on the 1965 Neil Simon play.

=== Key witness in Cotton Club case ===
In 1990, Wilson, whose manager was theatrical producer Roy Radin, had served as a key witness in the Los Angeles Superior Court trial of the four people accused of murdering Radin in connection with a dispute involving the film The Cotton Club (1984). Wilson stated that Radin, fearing an attempt on his life with an upcoming meeting, had asked Wilson to follow the limousine he was to enter the evening of May 13, 1983.

== Author ==
Wilson wrote several Christian books concerning the New Age Movement and the hidden dangers he believed it holds for society. New Age Millennium was released by CAP Publishing & Literary Co. LLC on December 1, 1998. Wilson, who also authored children's books, called the book an "exposé" of certain New Age "symbols and slogans".

His memoir Second Banana: The Bittersweet Memoirs of the Sanford & Son Years was released on August 31, 2009. Wilson said, "It's just a documented truth, behind the scenes factual account of what happened during those years. Redd (Foxx) and I were making history back in those days. We were the first blacks to be on television in that capacity and we opened the door for all those other shows that came after us."

== Later appearances and projects ==
Wilson made numerous guest appearances on the Praise the Lord program aired on the Trinity Broadcasting Network, and was a good friend of Clifton Davis. He also appeared as a guest star on the UPN sitcom Girlfriends, playing Lynn's biological father.

In the summer of 2011, Wilson started appearing with actress Nina Nicole in a touring production of the play The Measure of a Man by playwright Matt Hardwick. The play is described as "a faith-based production" and is set in a small town in south Georgia.

Wilson began work in 2010 to produce and act in a melodramatic family film based on the play Faith Ties. Wilson said of the project: "I play a broken down old drunk whose wife and daughter are killed and he's given up on life. The protagonist is a pastor who is in the middle while he watches the lives of people crumbling around him."

== Personal life and death ==
Wilson married model Cicely Johnston on May 3, 1974. They had six children. In 1984, he was ordained as a minister in the Church of God in Christ and was an active Christian evangelist for much of his adult life.

Wilson died of complications from cancer at his home in Palm Springs, California, on January 30, 2026, at age 79. His son Christopher confirmed to The New York Times that Wilson had been suffering from prostate cancer.

== Filmography ==
=== Film ===
Year	Title	Role	Notes
1970	Cotton Comes to Harlem	Rally Attendant	Uncredited
1971	The Organization	Charlie Blossom	
1972	Dealing: Or the Berkeley-to-Boston Forty-Brick Lost-Bag Blues	Rupert	
1981	Full Moon High	Cabbie-Busdriver	
1993	Me and the Kid	Agent Schamper	
2000	Hammerlock	Morgan Rivers	

=== Television ===
Year	Title	Role	Notes
1971	All in the Family	Horace	Episode: "Edith Writes a Song"
1971	Mission: Impossible	Simmons	Episode: "Underwater"
1972–1977	Sanford and Son	Lamont Sanford	Main role (135 episodes)
1978	Baby... I'm Back!	Raymond Ellis	Main role (13 episodes)
1979	The Love Boat	Bart	Episode: "Letter to Babycakes"
1981	The Love Boat	Jesse (Isaac's Uncle)	Episode: "Black Sheep"
1981	Today's FBI	Leon	Episode: "Terror"
1982–1983	The New Odd Couple	Oscar Madison	Main role (18 episodes)
1992	The Phil Donahue Show	Himself	Episode: Famous Past Celebrities
2004–2005	Girlfriends	Kenneth Miles	Recurring role (4 episodes)
