= Book of Numbers (film) =

1973 film by Raymond St. Jacques

- Theatrical release poster
- Directed by: Raymond St. Jacques
- Written by: Larry Spiegel
- Based on: Book of Numbers by Robert Deane Pharr
- Produced by: Raymond St. Jacques
- Starring: Raymond St. Jacques; Philip Michael Thomas; Freda Payne; Hope Clarke; Gilbert Green; Frank De Sal
- Cinematography: Gayne Rescher
- Edited by: Irving Rosenblum
- Music by: Al Schackman
- Production company: Brut Productions
- Distributed by: AVCO Embassy Pictures
- Release date: April 11, 1973
- Running time: 81 minutes
- Country: United States
- Language: English

Book of Numbers is a 1973 American crime film directed by and starring Raymond St. Jacques. It was produced by AVCO Embassy Pictures, and is the story of two black waiters who team up in El Dorado, Arkansas to run a numbers racket among the poor and working class black community in the 1930s. Meanwhile, they evade and outsmart the KKK, corrupt white police officers, and deflect a hostile take-over from a nearby mafia gang. The movie is based on the 1969 novel of the same name by Robert Deane Pharr, and is the only film directed by actor Raymond St. Jacques. It was filmed in Texas and received critical praise upon release for its stylish depiction of the South in the 1930s.

== Plot ==
The film begins with narration by Dave Greene about how he and Blueboy Harris had saved up enough money to quit their jobs as waiters and move to Arkansas with the intention of starting a numbers racket. He foreshadows that he wished he had never gone to El Dorado, as he is seen walking in a jazz funeral. The remainder of the film is a flashback to the illegal business with his partner and mentor, Blueboy, their struggles with the mafia, the KKK and a corrupt police force. Together with various employees, they start an illegal lottery in the back of a hair salon which quickly becomes profitable. A nearby white mafia boss, Luis Antoine sends one of his black lieutenants, Joe Gaines to intimidate Dave and Blueboy into handing over their profits, but they refuse, resulting in a shoot-out where several characters are killed. The rival mafia gang later attacks the salon and steals all of the numbers books (vital receipts to keep the business operational), so Dave and his friends concoct a plan to steal more. They dress up as members of the Ku Klux Klan, sneak over to the rival gang's hideout, and set up a burning cross to frighten Gaine's crew out of the house. But a posse of the real KKK arrive and attempt to join in the "good action" without realizing that underneath the white hoods were Dave's cohorts. Once revealed, a car chase ensues, and Dave's crew escape. Unexpectedly, a corrupt white police force raids the salon, steals all the cash and arrests Blueboy. He beats the conviction when he enters the courtroom and acts like a black stereotype Tom (scraping and begging and wringing his hat) until the white judge lets him off with a warning. This enrages Dave who is ashamed that Blueboy would degrade himself for the white judge, rather than hire a lawyer and defend himself with dignity and confidence becoming of a powerful businessman. Blueboy explains that his actions were tactical, and he used the court's white prejudice to manipulate the system and protect their business. The partners fight and Blueboy leaves, but when the mafia returns to attack Dave, Blueboy appears with a shotgun to save his friend. In the final battle, Blueboy is shot and dies in Dave's arms. As the film (and flashback) ends, Dave is walking in Blueboy's funeral procession, when he realizes what his mentor was trying to teach him. He narrates, "To Blueboy, the important thing was to pass it on. Like them footraces where one runner passes the stick on to another runner, and he keeps on running and running until it's time for him to pass it on. Blueboy passed it on to me, and I guess it's my turn now. Blueboy took it just as far as he could go. And if us niggers keep passing it on, maybe someday, just maybe someday, we'll pull up alongside them crackers, and maybe, maybe even pull ahead. The Lord knows I'd love to see that day." Dave plans to use the same courtroom tactic to evade a conviction, and to continue the numbers business.

== Cast ==
- Raymond St. Jacques as "Blueboy" Harris
- Philip Michael Thomas as Dave Green
- Freda Payne as Kelly Simms
- Hope Clarke as "Pigmeat" Goins
- Willie Washington Jr. as "Makepeace" Johnson
- Doug Finell as "Eggy"
- Sterling St. Jacques as "Kid Flick"
- C.L. Williams as "Blip Blip"
- D'Urville Martin as Billy "Bowlegs"
- Jerry Leon as Joe Gaines
- Gilbert Green as Luis Antoine
- Frank De Sal as Carlos
- Temie Mae Williams as Sister Clara Goode
- Charles F. Elyston as Mr. Booker
- Queen Esther Gent as Mrs. Booker
- Irma P. Hall as Georgia Brown
- Chiquita Jackson as Didi
- Katie Peters as "Honey"
- Pat Peterson as Becky
- Reginald T. Dorsey as "Junebug"

== Background ==
The film is based on the novel, The Book of Numbers, by Robert Deane Pharr, published in 1969. It was filmed outside Dallas, Texas as the setting for rural Arkansas of the 1930s, and originally the funding was difficult to raise. While filming in 1972, director Raymond St. Jacques' home in Bel Air was robbed. In one scene from the film, characters bet on the famous boxing match between James Braddock and Joe Louis from 1937. Actress Freda Payne stated that the offer for her to play the role of Kelly was a shock, and she described the set as hot and humid, but fun to work on. Director Raymond St. Jacques intended for this film to be the first in several movies and plays that would feature stories about the black experience, and he ensured that black people were integral in the behind-the-scenes production by placing apprentices in each key department.

== Themes ==
=== Double consciousness ===
There is a distinct difference between the two main characters and how they approach racism, interactions with whites and activism. Blueboy is from the older generation who works within inherent prejudices and discrimination to manipulate and evade confrontation, but also to succeed. When Dave argues that Blueboy's courtroom behavior made the white people think they were fools, Blueboy states in the film, "Son, what they think don't matter. Don't you know having the crackers' respect don't mean we ain't one bit less nigger to them?!" However, Dave, who is young and proud, argues that they should fight and stand up for their dignity in the face of racism. "And you call being reduced to nothing 'foolin em'? Crackers ain't that crazy. Now I can see fighting them and losing 'em, but what you done ... ?!" The relationship between the two main characters are that of father and son, as Blueboy explains, "Dave, do you think I'm proud of what I done? You think I've been proud all my life of having to bow my head and 'Tom.' Just so as I could survive. Son, I did what I done today for you. For you youngins. 'Cause you youngins got to carry on the good fight. Me? My kind, we're finished. But you can't do it behind bars." Blueboy's intention is to tactically avoid imprisonment by using the ignorance of the white judge and pretend to be a bumbling black stereotype. This method is echoed in other films, such as Blazing Saddles (1974). Donald Bogle writes, "The latter presented audiences with a new-style coon: a coon with a double consciousness. Here in this uneven but wildly energetic spoof on Westerns, Cleavon Little plays a black man who shows up in a white (and hostile) Old West community. As the town's new sheriff, he knows the only way he'll survive is by playing the role of a dumb black nigger; he does precisely that and is able not only to survive but to triumph too." Conversely, in Book of Numbers, Dave is proud of creating a business independent of any white interference, and is willing to fight to maintain their success. By the end of the film, after Blueboy's death, Dave decides he will mimic Blueboy's tactics to manipulate the oppressive, racist system and attempt to evade conviction.

=== Criminal activity and racism ===
One theme of the film is the use of illegal or criminal activity for the black characters to achieve financial independence in a white-dominated Depression Era southern community. The two characters, Dave and Blueboy, transition from positions of servitude as professional waiters, to positions of leadership and influence as controllers of the numbers racket. This success and wealth quickly spreads to their numerous employees and can be seen visually through costume and set changes. When they first arrive in town, they meet with several black men, all dressed in shabby clothing and overalls. After enlisting them to help with their enterprise, everyone can be seen wearing fine suits and hats in later scenes, and they can afford to purchase a large home with numerous recreation rooms. A principal statement of the source material for the film is that black people were not afforded enough economic opportunities to truly achieve the American Dream, and thus in order for there to be black wealth, there had to be crime. But the director's objective for the film was not to glorify crime, rather to show a part of the community that offered financial hope and independence.

Playwright and professor of literature at Emerson College, Jabari Asim, writes, "Dave, a young man with a nose for cash, and Blueboy, a 'born professional if ever there was one,' have few legitimate avenues open to them. It is this lamentable absence of opportunity that makes numbers banking 'the only business in America that was open to every enterprising Negro.' Their success – and the creativity and intelligence they must utilize to attain it – make the pair prototypical 'race men,' figures in black whose rise invigorates the community that bears witness to their climb. To many of the scrambling regulars of the Block, Blueboy and Dave are antiheroes in the best possible sense, doing for self and kind without appearing to bow and scrape before 'the Man.'"

Similar to other blaxploitation films, there is also the presence of the mafia. The rival gang that tries to muscle in on the protagonists' community is run by a white mafia boss, Luis Antoine, who has hired a black lieutenant, Gaines. In the first scene with Antoine, he is in a naked in a bathtub giving orders to Gaines, who is standing in a suit. The positioning and costuming of this scene indicate the racial power structure between the two villains.

Additionally, there is a corrupt white police force that robs from black characters with impunity. In an early scene, Blip Blip (C. L. Williams) is pulled over by a white cop for speeding, only to accept a bribe but demand everything in his wallet. When the police raid the salon, they take all the cash for themselves, leaving only a graffiti wall as evidence for the courtroom. While the black characters only find true wealth and success through the numbers operation, the white characters profit mainly from robbing the black community.

== Soundtrack ==
Book of Numbers has a soundtrack by composer Al Schuckman, with performances by blues musicians Sonny Terry and Brownie McGhee. It was released by Brut/Buddah Records in 1973 and included the songs, "I Walk with the Lord," "Blue's Last Walk," "Cracker Cops," "Blueboy's Holler," and "Moog Montage: The Klan / No Way Out / Chase Down."

== Reception ==
Generally the criticism for the film was positive, often noting how beautifully the design and costumes reflected the time period. Several reviewers commented on the portrayal of black characters. For example, film critic, Roger Ebert wrote "Book of Numbers has a point to make: If blacks had to play a role to survive, they did - and they did survive." The Philadelphia Daily Newspaper called it "a refreshing contrast to such loud and frantic black efforts as The Mack and Black Caesar."
