= Foster and Laurie =

1975 movie

- Genre: Drama
- Written by: Albert Ruben, Al Silverman
- Directed by: John Llewellyn Moxey
- Starring: Perry King; Dorian Harewood; Talia Shire; Jonelle Allen
- Theme music composer: Lalo Schifrin
- Country of origin: United States
- Original language: English

Production
- Executive producer: Charles W. Fries
- Producer: Arthur Stolnitz
- Production locations: New York City; Los Angeles; 309 E 5th St, Los Angeles, California; NYCPD 9th Precinct - 321 E 5th St, Manhattan, New York City
- Cinematography: John M. Nickolaus Jr.
- Editor: Bud S. Isaacs
- Running time: 90 minutes
- Production companies: Charles Fries Productions; Fries Productions

Original release
- Network: CBS
- Release: November 13, 1975

Foster and Laurie is a 1975 made-for-TV movie. It is the story of two NYCPD officers, Gregory Philip Foster and Rocco W. Laurie, who were murdered while on patrol in the East Village, Manhattan, New York City in 1972.

== Production and cast notes ==
Foster and Laurie originally aired on November 13, 1975 on CBS. It was based on the 1974 book of the same name by Al Silverman.

Talia Shire, who plays the widow, Adelaide Laurie, was at the time between her roles in The Godfather and Rocky.
