= Victims (film) =

- Genre: Drama
- Written by: Conrad Bromberg; William Wood
- Directed by: Jerrold Freedman
- Starring: Kate Nelligan; Ken Howard; Madge Sinclair; Amy Madigan; Jonelle Allen
- Theme music composer: Lalo Schifrin
- Country of origin: United States
- Original language: English

Production
- Executive producer: George Eckstein
- Producer: Douglas Benton
- Cinematography: Robert Steadman
- Editor: Greyfox
- Running time: 120 min.
- Production company: Warner Bros. Television

Original release
- Network: ABC
- Release: January 11, 1982

Victims is an American 1982 TV movie, starring Kate Nelligan. The film was directed by Jerrold Freedman written by Conrad Bromberg and William Wood.

== Plot summary ==
A serial rapist who gets released on a technicality because of a mishandling of the investigation is pursued by his victims, who stalk him and want revenge for him raping them.

== Cast ==
- Ken Howard as Joe Buckley
- Kate Nelligan as Ruth Hession
- Madge Sinclair as Sgt. Ashcroft
- Jonelle Allen as Maydene Jariott
- Pamela Dunlap as Nina Blygelder
- Amy Madigan as Chloe Brill
- Rose Portillo as Pilar Galloway
- Sherry Hursey as Susan Arthur
- Karmin Murcelo as Nellie Ramirez
- Bert Remsen as Lt. McClain
- Michael C. Gwynne as Attorney Walters
- Howard Hesseman as Charles Galloway
- Alex Henteloff as Judge Armand Golds
- Howard Hesseman as Charles Galloway
