= A Rage in Harlem =

1991 film by Bill Duke

- Home video release poster
- Directed by: Bill Duke
- Written by: John Toles-Bey; Bobby Crawford
- Based on: A Rage in Harlem by Chester Himes
- Produced by: Kerry Rock; Stephen Woolley
- Starring: Forest Whitaker; Gregory Hines; Robin Givens; Zakes Mokae; Danny Glover
- Cinematography: Toyomichi Kurita
- Edited by: Curtiss Clayton
- Music by: Elmer Bernstein; Jeff Vincent
- Production company: Palace Productions
- Distributed by: Miramax Films
- Release date: May 3, 1991
- Running time: 115 minutes
- Country: United States
- Language: English
- Budget: $8 million
- Box office: $10.4 million (USA)

A Rage in Harlem is a 1991 American crime film directed by Bill Duke and loosely based on Chester Himes' novel A Rage in Harlem. The film stars Forest Whitaker, Danny Glover, Badja Djola, Robin Givens and Gregory Hines. Producer Stephen Woolley intended it to be a comedy film, and several reviewers have described it as such, but this categorization has been disputed by director Bill Duke.

The film premiered in competition at the 44th Cannes Film Festival in its Grand Palais, receiving a "five-minute standing ovation." It was also shown at the 2nd Stockholm International Film Festival.

== Plot ==
It is 1956, in Natchez, Mississippi. Slim and his crew, Hank and Jodie, are negotiating with Lester, a fence; they are trying to sell the gold they stole in a mining robbery. The deal goes south, and under duress Lester discloses that the only other person capable of fencing the gold is Easy Money in Harlem, New York. The Sheriff shows up, and in the confusion Imabelle, Slim's gun moll, drives off with the gold in a trunk, and travels to New York City.

In Harlem, Jackson is a devout and naive young man, working as a bookkeeper for H. Exodus Clay at his funeral parlor. His estranged stepbrother, Goldy (who Jackson routinely calls Sherman) is a small-time hoodlum and also impersonates a priest in order sell fake "tickets to heaven." Jackson has skimped to save $1,500.

Imabelle arrives with her trunk but has no money. She attends the Undertaker's Ball, looking for a source of support, and meets Jackson. She seduces him, and moves into his apartment. Slim and crew travel to Harlem, and enlist Imabelle to help them take Jackson's money, using "The Blow," a scam whereby money is seemingly changed to a higher denomination by baking it in an oven. They claim they can turn Jackson's $1,500 into $15,000, but he is reluctant at first. During the scam, the oven explodes and Slim bursts into the room, impersonating a United States Marshall.

Jackson bribes Slim with $200 but must steal the money from Mr. Clay since his money is now gone. Jackson learns that Slim has "arrested" Imabelle and taken her away, so he approaches Goldy to help find her, due to his knowledge of Harlem's criminal underworld. Goldy agrees, but insists that he retains the gold. Goldy learns the crew is using the gold to run a fake gold mine scam and gives Jackson a fake bank roll in order to lure Gus, the crew's contact man. Gus and Jackson travel to the crew's headquarters, with Goldy and Big Kathy following. Goldy overpowers Gus, then he and Big Kathy enter the apartment posing as the police. Jackson runs up to the apartment, followed closely by uniformed police and the two detectives. In the ensuing melee, Gus is shot and a police officer has acid thrown in his face. The crew escapes with Imabelle in tow, and retreat to Slim's office. Jackson, Goldy and Big Kathy acquire the hearse from Mr. Clay's funeral parlor, in order to transport the gold. The crew departs again, leaving Imabelle with the gold. They drive by as Imabelle goes downstairs, and abduct her. They stop when they see the gold, which has been transferred to the hearse, and Slim kills Big Kathy when he intervenes. Goldy leaves with Imabelle, intending to avenge his death.

Slim and crew meet with Easy Money the enact the sale of the gold, but Slim calls off the deal out of annoyance with him. There is a shootout where Hank and Josie are killed. When Goldy bursts in, he is shot and Easy Money is mortally wounded. Slim escapes with Imabelle, and Jackson arrives to confront him. They tussle, but as Slim prepares to slit Jackson's throat it is Imabelle who shoots Slim dead. While Grave Digger and Coffin Ed apprehend Jackson for his initial theft of Mr. Clay's money, Imabelle leaves with the money from the deal, heading back to Mississippi. Mr. Clay makes bail for Jackson because he appreciates the business Jackson has drummed up for him; the money found on Slim's thugs will go towards their funerals, to be performed by Mr. Clay. Jackson hurries to the train station, where Imabelle has left $50,000 for Goldy and a similar sum for Jackson, along with a note telling him that he is too good for her. Jackson and Goldy briefly reconcile, then Jackson boards the train while leaving his money behind. Jackson and Imabelle reunite and depart for Mississippi together.

== Cast ==
- Forest Whitaker as Jackson
- Gregory Hines as Goldy/Sherman
- Robin Givens as Imabelle
- Zakes Mokae as Big Kathy
- Danny Glover as Easy Money
- Badja Djola as Slim
- John Toles-Bey as Jodie
- Tyler Collins as Teena
- Ron Taylor as Hank
- Samm-Art Williams as Gus Parsons
- Stack Pierce as Detective Ed "Coffin Ed" Johnson
- Willard E. Pugh as Claude X
- Helen Martin as Mrs. Canfield
- Wendell Pierce as Louis
- T. K. Carter as Smitty
- Jalacy Hawkins as Jay "Screamin' Jay" Hawkins
- Beatrice Winde as Clerk
- George Wallace as Detective "Gravedigger" Jones

== Movie compared to novel ==
The novel and the movie differ significantly in several ways. In the book, Harlem is shown as gritty and seedy, while in the movie it is relatively vibrant. Imabelle and Slim are married in the book, but this in not mentioned in the movie. Gold ore, which is actually fool's gold, is central to the novel, while in the movie it is real gold. In the novel, Goldy is Jackson's overweight twin brother who begs for alms and sells bogus "tickets to heaven" while cross dressing as a nun. He is an informer to the police, and a drug addict who regularly shoots up morphine and cocaine speedballs. In the movie, Goldy is Jackson's step-brother, a trim and dapper numbers runner and occasional bogus priest who does sell "tickets to heaven," but does not solicit donations, cross-dress, or take drugs. Grave Digger and Coffin Ed are feared for their ability to dish out sudden death in the novel, while the movie shows them to be buffoons. In the movie, the brothel keeper, Big Kathy, is an androgynous woman. while in the book Big Kathy is a cross dressing man. Also, Goldie is much closer to Big Kathy in the movie; Goldy calls him "real family" as says "he's the only person I cared about." In the novel, Goldy is murdered when Slim slits his throat (whereas it's Big Kathy who gets their throat cut by Jodie, in the novel), while in the movie he survives and is able to reconnect with his brother in the end. Both the film and novel have Jackson and Imabelle happily reunited in the end, but in the film they move to Mississippi, while in the book they stay in Harlem.

== Development ==
William Horberg, eventually credited as an executive producer, got the project started when he optioned the rights to Himes' novel. Hornberg, a first-time producer approached John Toles-Bey, a Chicago-based actor with no screenwriting credits, to draft the film's first script; the development effort gained steam after Hornberg met Kerry Boyle of Palace Productions, and through the efforts of Boyle and Stephen Woolley, the film was sold to Miramax Films and given the green-light.

According to publicity leading up to the start of principal photography, Forest Whitaker was the first of the two lead actors to commit to the film, described as an action-comedy with "very dark" comedy. Whitaker among others, was consulted as Boyle and Woolley sought an African American to direct the film, doing so because they believed "maintaining the cultural integrity of the novel demanded a black director"; they also wanted "someone who was older and secure enough to collaborate and make a picture that we could distribute widely, but who still had a passion for the material." They chose Duke in part for his experience directing Hill Street Blues, experience that was key "because of the way that series mixed humor and violence." Duke later cast Robin Givens to play the female lead after considering 300 women for the part.

== Production ==
The film was shot in the Cincinnati, Ohio, neighborhood of Over-the-Rhine, whose "un-gentrified area of the old downtown lower depths stood in quite nicely for ... 1950s Harlem." About midway during production, it turned out that Duke and Woolley had undiscussed differences about the tone the film was going to take:

About halfway through we [Woolley and Duke] were looking at a scene, and I turned to Bill [Duke] and said 'You know, that wasn't quite as funny as it was in the script. And I don't know why. And he said to me, 'We're not making no god-damn comedy.' I'd raised the entire money for this film on the basis that it was a comedy. It was Chester Himes, it was supposed to be funny. And a shiver went down my spine...I hoped that Bill was joking. But I realized he thought we were making Porgy and Bess.

== Reception ==
On the review aggregator website Rotten Tomatoes, 68% of 37 critics' reviews are positive, with an average rating of 6.2/10. The website's consensus reads: "If it can't quite live up to its source material, A Rage in Harlem still proves a stylishly effective period thriller."

Vincent Canby, reviewing the film for The New York Times, called it "painless, occasionally funny" but with a "heedlessly incomprehensible plot"; according to Canby, "Because the screenplay is so thin, the characters are revealed entirely by the actors who play them. Miss Givens does particularly well as a doxy with a heart of gold as well as a trunk full of it. She looks great and shows a real flair for absurd comedy. Mr. Hines, Mr. Whitaker and Mr. Glover also are in good form, as are Badja Djola, who plays Imabelle's intimidatingly large former lover, the guy she's stolen the gold from, and Mr. Toles-Bey, who, in addition to working on the screenplay, appears as one of the bad guys." Roger Ebert of the Chicago Sun-Times gave it 3 out of 4 and wrote: "What's best in the movie is the chemistry between Whitaker and Givens, who is surprisingly effective in her first feature role." Owen Gleiberman of Entertainment Weekly was positive about the atmosphere, comedy, and raw acting talent, but critical of the plot which he called "a complete shambles". Gleiberman gave it "C−" grade.

The film grossed $10.4 million in the United States.
