= The Blacks (play) =

1958 play written by Jean Genet

- Original language: French
- Written by: Jean Genet

Premiere
- Date: 28 October 1959
- Place: Théâtre de Lutèce; Paris, France

The Blacks (French: Les Nègres) is a play by the French dramatist Jean Genet. Published in 1958, it was first performed in a production directed by Roger Blin at the Théâtre de Lutèce in Paris, France, which opened on 28 October 1959.

== Synopsis ==
A review of the Theatre Royal Stratford East production (2007) states:

Using the framework of a play within a play, it exposes racial prejudice and stereotypes while exploring black identity. As a troupe of black actors re-enact the trial and ensuing murder of a white woman before a kangaroo court, the Queen and her entourage look on and comment. Five of the 13 black actors don Whiteface to play establishment figures. The Queen (a whited-up woman) comes to a Command Performance, but the proceedings are far removed from any Royal Variety Show.

== In Genet's oeuvre ==
In a prefatory note, Genet specifies the conditions under which he anticipates the play would be performed, revealing his characteristic concern with the politics and ritual of theatricality:

This play, written, I repeat, by a white man, is intended for a white audience, but if, which is unlikely, it is ever performed before a black audience, then a white person, male or female, should be invited every evening. The organizer of the show should welcome him formally, dress him in ceremonial costume and lead him to his seat, preferably in the first row of the orchestra. The actors will play for him. A spotlight should be focused upon this symbolic white throughout the performance.
But what if no white person accepted? Then let white masks be distributed to the black spectators as they enter the theater. And if the blacks refuse the masks, then let a dummy be used.

After The Balcony in 1960, The Blacks was the second of Genet's plays to be staged in New York. The production was the longest-running Off-Broadway non-musical of the decade. This 1961 New York production opened on 4 May at the St. Mark's Playhouse and ran for 1,408 performances. It was directed by Gene Frankel, with sets by Kim E. Swados, music by Charles Gross, and costumes and masks by Patricia Zipprodt. The original cast featured James Earl Jones as Deodatus, Roscoe Lee Browne as Archibald, Louis Gossett Jr., as Edgar Alas Newport News, Cicely Tyson as Stephanie, Godfrey Cambridge as Diouf, Jay J. Riley as the Governor, Cynthia Belgrave as Adelaide Bobo, Ethel Ayler as Augusta Snow, Helen Martin as Felicity Trollop Pardon, Raymond St. Jacques as Judge, Maya Angelou as the White Queen and Charles Gordone as the burglar.

Shi Mei Li directed the play in 1983.

== See also ==
- Theater of the Absurd
- Whiteface (performance)
- Les Blancs
