= Baby... I'm Back! =

1970s American sitcom

- Genre: Sitcom
- Created by: Lila Garrett; Mort Lachman
- Written by: Chet Dowling; David Garber; Lila Garrett; George Geiger; Kevin Hartigan; April Kelly; Sandy Krinski; Mort Lachman; Martin Rips; Joseph Staretski
- Directed by: Dick Harwood; Nick Havinga; Mark Warren
- Starring: Demond Wilson; Denise Nicholas; Helen Martin; Kim Fields; Tony Holmes; Ed Hall
- Narrated by: Demond Wilson
- Theme music composer: Jeff Barry
- Composer: Jeff Barry
- Country of origin: United States
- Original language: English
- No. of seasons: 1
- No. of episodes: 13

Production
- Executive producer: Charles Fries
- Producer: Chet Dowling
- Cinematography: Jim Kilgore
- Editor: Jim McElroy
- Camera setup: Multi-camera
- Running time: 22–24 minutes
- Production companies: Lila Garrett Productions; Dewil Productions; Charles Fries Productions

Original release
- Network: CBS
- Release: January 30 – April 24, 1978

Baby... I'm Back! is an American sitcom television series that aired on CBS in early 1978. The series stars Demond Wilson, Denise Nicholas, Helen Martin and Kim Fields.

== Synopsis ==
Raymond Ellis is a compulsive gambler who abandoned his family (wife Olivia, son Jordan and daughter Angie) and headed to California. Seven years later while in California, Ray finds out that his wife plans to remarry to Colonel Wallace Dickey, and that he has been declared legally dead. This prompts him to move back to Washington, D.C., where he tries to win back Olivia by proving he is a better husband, and a better father to his kids, and to prove that he is still alive. However, he now has to contend with his mother-in-law Luzelle and Olivia's soon-to-be husband Colonel Wallace Dickey.

== Production ==
The pilot was videotaped in September 1977. CBS picked the pilot up as a mid-season replacement, going into production at the CBS Studio Center lot in November 1977, for airing from January to April 1978.

In the book Funny You Should Ask: Oral Histories of Classic Sitcom Storytellers by Scott Lewellen, Lila Garrett created the show to address the social issue of the time of black males not being able to get jobs to provide for their families. Many had abandoned their families because of it and in this case, the lead character did abandon his family, but once he found work and got his act together, he came back, hence the name of the show. In the show, the mother had a great government job at the Pentagon and lived in a nice apartment. At the time of casting Wilson had just completed Sanford and Son and Nicholas was a hot commodity. Garrett saw the chemistry between the two. Nicholas said in a summer 1978 edition of Jet Magazine that she was surprised at the cancellation of the series despite decent ratings.

Garrett stated the show was cancelled due to Norman Lear wanting Good Times to come back for another season and told CBS that he would create them another show in exchange for it.

== Cast ==
- Demond Wilson as Raymond Ellis
- Denise Nicholas as Olivia Ellis
- Tony Holmes as Jordan Ellis
- Kim Fields as Angie Ellis
- Helen Martin as Luzelle Carter
- Ed Hall as Colonel Wallace Dickey

== Episodes ==
No.	Title	Directed by	Written by	Original release date
0	"Pilot"	Bill Persky	Lila Garrett & Mort Lachman	October 22, 1977
In this pilot episode of this series, Ray briefs the viewing audience in a voiceover about how Olivia and Wallace tried to get married and had him declared legally dead. He of course foiled the attempt, but Olivia and Wallace attempt again to get married causing Ray to try to get himself declared legally alive so she will not be able to marry another person. Olivia surprises him by moving up the time of the wedding so that Ray will not have enough time to spoil the ceremony.
1	"Living Proof"	Bill Persky	Lila Garrett & Mort Lachman	January 30, 1978
This first episode begins with Olivia and Luzelle at her lawyers officially declaring Raymond Ellis legally dead after no contact or calls have been made for the last seven years. Ray runs into an old friend in California who informs him that Olivia has declared him dead legally and is getting remarried. Ray flies back to reconcile with Olivia and the children: son Jordan is not at all thrilled when he learns his father is back while daughter Angie is ecstatic, Luzelle attacks him with sponges as Olivia walks in with disappointment once she realizes he is back. Although Ray is back, Olivia continues with her plans to marry Wallace Dickey but the wedding gets a surprise guest. Ray moves into Olivia's building to be closer to her and the kids.
2	"Pay or Die"	Dick Harwood	Kevin Hartigan & David Garber	February 6, 1978
Ray is all of a sudden been tracked down by two men who claim that they are loan shark collectors for someone who lent Ray $200 seven years ago. Ray must pay back the $200 plus the interest per week over the seven years that has accumulated, bringing the amount to $7,280. He is threatened and is afraid for his life. He goes to Olivia for help but she accuses him of lying.
3	"Farewell to Boyish Charm"	Nick Havinga	Richard Powell	February 13, 1978
It is Ray and Olivia's 15th wedding anniversary. Ray has romantic plans for the evening but Olivia would rather spend a nice quiet evening with her fiance Wallace. Unlucky with his plans, Ray goes to the local bar and runs into Racine Parks, a woman he and Olivia went to high school with. Since Ray could not have Olivia, he decides to take Racine to his place for a rendezvous but not without stopping by Olivia's first to see Olivia and then up to his place causing Olivia to be jealous. Ray and Racine's fun comes to an end when Ray gets a phone call from someone that knows what he and Racine have been up to.
4	"The Loneliest Night of the Week"	Dick Harwood	Story by : Shelly Zellman & Wally Dalton; Teleplay by : April Kelly & George Geiger	February 20, 1978
With Luzelle and the kids leaving for the weekend, Olivia plans a romantic dinner for her and Wallace, who calls to tell Olivia that he is unable to make it due to army maneuvers but it is Ray who takes the call and manages to use Wallace's absence to his advantage to spend a romantic evening with Olivia; Luzelle and the kids gets stranded on the road after the car breaks down.
5	"Beat by a Drum"	Asaad Kelada	Martin Rips & Joseph Staretski	February 27, 1978
After his mother refuses to give Jorden $300 for drums, Ray offers to give the Jordan the cash also hoping this will bring him closer to his son. Olivia is furious and tells Ray off then makes Jordan return the drums and give Ray's money back. Jordan then accuses his father of giving him the money to get closer to his mother.
6	"The Gospel According to Angie"	Nick Havinga	Erwin Washington & Chet Dowling & Sandy Krinski	March 13, 1978
Angie puts on a church play about the story of Ruth from the Bible with a little twist. Ruth is about to marry another man (who is bald at the top of the head) until the "prodigal son" (played by Jordan) returns after 7 years and claims that Ruth is still his wife and remarries her. Ruth's mother responds by dropping dead. It was told that Ruth remarried her first husband for the sake of the children. And of course, it is revealed by Angie in front of the whole congregation that Ray helped her write this church play. (It was so obvious, right?) Olivia angrily decides to leave on a trip with Wallace despite Ray's objections.
7	"The Confessions of Col. Wallace Dickey"	Dick Harwood	Story by : Bruce Kalish & Philip Wickham Taylor; Teleplay by : Kevin Hartigan & David Garber	March 20, 1978
Olivia is all dressed up to go to a banquet at the pentagon with Wallace, but Wallace and Ray go for drinks at the local hangout and Wallace ends up getting drunk and shares moments of his past life with Ray.
8	"A Day at the Races"	Mark Warren	Story by : Jim Belcher; Teleplay by : April Kelly & George Geiger	March 27, 1978
Olivia is furious when she discovers that, after spending the day with Ray, Jordan made bets at the racetrack winning $200. Ray convinces Olivia to let him bet the money on a longshot horse that Jordan predicts to win for $18,000. Olivia soon changes her tunes once she realizes that the horse is winning the race on television. Luzelle gets smashed (drunk) while attempting to cook a French dinner for Angie and Jordan "after a day with that low-life father".
9	"Survival of the Fittest"	Mark Warren	Marion Freeman & Mark Evanier	April 3, 1978
Olivia, Wallace and the kids go out of town for the weekend while Luzelle stays behind. Ray drops in to find out Olivia has left with her fiancée and the kids, then manages to find out where they are staying from Luzelle without her knowing right away. As Ray is driving his friend's motor home on Interstate 95, someone comes out of hiding in a wooden chest inside of the motor home. Much to Ray's surprise, it is Luzelle. Olivia and the rest of the clan return due to bad weather, while Ray and Luzelle have to spend the evening together stuck on the highway due to a bad snowstorm.
10	"Like Father, Unlike Son"	Mark Warren	Story by : Martin Rips & Joseph Staretski; Teleplay by : Gary Jacobs	April 10, 1978
Due to Luzelle's insomnia, Angie is sent to room with Jordan, who protests against his mother's wishes by going upstairs to room with Ray, who tries to make him go back to his mother so Ray can have peace and watch a game on TV. Eventually everyone meets in Ray's apartment and eventually comes to an agreement as to who will sleep where, which brings an unexpected result for Ray.
11	"Olivia's Job Offer"	Mark Warren	Story by : Harry Cauley; Teleplay by : April Kelly & George Geiger	April 17, 1978
Olivia runs into her friend Anita at the Pentagon who tells her about how great Guam is and how it was life changing for her. With some mistaken encouragement from her mother, Olivia does some re-examining of her life and decides not to choose between Ray and Wallace, leave her life and job behind, pick up her family and move to the dry gulch location of Guam.
12	"You Bet Your Wife"	Mark Warren	Story by : April Kelly & George Geiger; Teleplay by : Sandy Krinski & Chet Dowling	May 1, 1978
In this final episode for the season, Ray gets a temporary job in Hialeah, FL and makes a bet with Olivia that Wallace could fall under temptation of another woman. Ray tells her that if Wallace fights temptation, he will take the job in Hialeah and leave for the time, and if Wallace gives in to the woman, Olivia must spend a romantic night at Ray's place. Olivia puts herself in disguise and proceeds to seduce Wallace with Ray watching at the local hangout.

== Syndication ==
Reruns aired occasionally on Black Entertainment Television in the late 1980s and early 1990s.
