= Come Back, Charleston Blue =

1972 film

- Theatrical release poster
- Directed by: Mark Warren
- Written by: Peggy Elliott; Bontche Schweig
- Based on: The Heat's On by Chester Himes
- Produced by: Samuel Goldwyn Jr.
- Starring: Godfrey Cambridge; Raymond St. Jacques
- Cinematography: Richard C. Kratina
- Edited by: George Bowers; Gerald B. Greenberg
- Music by: Donny Hathaway
- Production company: Formosa Productions
- Distributed by: Warner Bros.
- Release date: June 29, 1972
- Running time: 100 minutes
- Country: United States
- Language: English

Come Back, Charleston Blue is a 1972 American crime comedy film starring Godfrey Cambridge and Raymond St. Jacques, loosely based on Chester Himes' novel The Heat's On. It is a sequel to the 1970 film Cotton Comes to Harlem.

== Plot ==
Detectives Ed "Coffin Ed" Johnson and "Grave Digger" Jones are confounded by a string of strange murders in the neighborhood of Harlem, New York. The murders themselves are not nearly as bizarre as the calling card left by the murderer: a blue steel straight razor. Legend has it that this was the calling card of Charleston Blue, a vigilante who tried to rid the neighborhood of all criminal elements using a straight razor. Blue, having disappeared years ago after he went after Dutch Schultz (with his trusty straight razor), was considered dead by all except his girlfriend, who kept his razors locked away until his "comeback."

Soon after the murders start, it is discovered that the razors were missing, and all evidence points to Joe Painter, a local photographer, who has begun dating Carol, the beloved niece of mafia errand boy Caspar Brown. Joe and Brown are at odds over Caspar's refusal to help Joe kick the mafia out of the neighborhood, so Joe enlists the help of a group of brothers and the spirit of Charleston Blue. However, Johnson and Jones discover that Joe's plan does not seem to be exactly what he claimed it was.

== Cast ==
- Godfrey Cambridge as Detective "Gravedigger" Jones
- Raymond St. Jacques as Detective Ed "Coffin Ed" Johnson
- Peter Deanda as Joe Painter/Charleston Blue
- Percy Rodriguez as Captain Frederick J. Bryce
- Jonelle Allen as Carol
- Maxwell Glanville as Caspar
- Minnie Gentry as "Her Majesty"
- Dick Sabol as Jarema
- Leonardo Cimino as Frank Mago
- Toney Brealond as Drag Queen
- Tim Pelt as Earl "Earl J"
- Marcia McBroom as Girl Barber
- Darryl Knibb as Douglas
- Joseph Ray as Bubba
- Adam Wade as Benjamin "Benjy"
- Dorothi Fox as Streetwalker

Theodore Wilson as Cemetery Guard

Also appearing in a minor role is Philip Michael Thomas (as a Minister) in his film debut.

== Production ==
The film was shot in Harlem, which required producer Samuel Goldwyn Jr. to negotiate with CORE and other groups over their demands for "money, jobs and control."

== Reception ==
This film was a sequel to the film Cotton Comes to Harlem: appearing two years later, it opened to mixed reviews, with critics feeling it was decent, but not riotous like the original 1970 film.

In April 1972, less than three months before the film's release, Time magazine called the film "part of a new Hollywood wave of eminently commercial movies by blacks about the black experience," a wave that included Sweet Sweetback's Baadasssss Song, Shaft, Shaft's Big Score, Cool Breeze, Buck and the Preacher, The Legend of Nigger Charley, Super Fly, and Blacula.

A.H. Weiler, reviewing the film for The New York Times, called it "only occasionally funny or incisive" with a "convoluted plot and dialogue that is often too 'in' for the uninitiated."

Come Back Charleston Blue

Soundtrack album by Donny Hathaway
- Released: 1972
- Recorded: 1972
- Label: Atco Records
- Producers: Donny Hathaway, Quincy Jones (supervision)

Donny Hathaway chronology
Live (1972)	Come Back Charleston Blue (1972)	Roberta Flack & Donny Hathaway (1972)

== Soundtrack ==
All tracks written by Donny Hathaway except "Little Ghetto Boy" (Earl DuRouen / Edward Howard) and "Come Back Charleston Blue" (Donny Hathaway / Al Cleveland / Quincy Jones).

Track	Song	Length
1	Main Theme	02:20
2	Basie	03:53
3	String Segue	00:34
4	Vegetable Wagon	01:07
5	Harlem Dawn	01:38
6	Scratchy Record	03:09
7	Explosion	00:23
8	Hearse to the Graveyard	02:46
9	Switch "Charleston Blue"	00:32
10	Come Back Basie	02:36
11	Detective's Goof	00:28
12	Grave Digger Jones & Coffin Head Johnson's Funeral	03:02
13	String Segue	00:17
14	Little Ghetto Boy	03:50
15	Hail to the Queen	00:21
16	Drag Queen Chase	00:47
17	Bossa Nova	01:47
18	Tim's High	01:30
19	Furniture Truck	01:18
20	Liberation	02:52
21	Come Back Charleston Blue	02:04

In November 2007, Rhino Records released a remastered version of the soundtrack album, which included two new tracks, an alternate version and a live version of "Little Ghetto Boy."

== See also ==
- List of American films of 1972
