= Robert Deane Pharr =

American novelist

Robert Deane Pharr (1916–1989 or 1992) was an African-American novelist.

Pharr attended Saint Paul's Normal and Industrial School, Lincoln University, Virginia Union University and Fisk University, but spent most of his career working as a waiter. He graduated from Virginia Union University in 1939, and did graduate work at Fisk, Columbia University, and New York University. He described his goal when he started writing as to be a "black Sinclair Lewis". He is best known for his debut novel The Book of Numbers (1969), about the numbers racket, which was adapted into a 1973 film of the same name. A draft of his novel Giveadamn Brown and related correspondence were given to the Archives and Special Collections Department, L. Douglas Wilder Library, at Virginia Union University.

== Works ==
- The Book of Numbers (1969)
- S.R.O. (1971)
- The Welfare Bitch (1973)
- The Soul Murder Case (1975)
- Giveadamn Brown (1978)
