= Dark Girls =

- Film poster
- Directed by: D. Channsin Berry & Bill Duke
- Produced by: D. Channsin Berry & Bill Duke
- Release date: September 14, 2011 (Toronto)
- Country: United States
- Language: English

Dark Girls is a 2011 documentary film by Bill Duke and D. Channsin Berry. It documents colorism within the African American community, a subject still considered taboo by many black Americans. The film contains interviews of African American women describing the role colorism has played in their lives, with notable African Americans including Viola Davis also detailing her experience. It also reports on a new version of the 1940s black doll experiment by Kenneth and Mamie Clark, which proved that black children had internalized racism by having children select a white or a black doll (they typically chose white) based on questions asked. In the updated version, black children favored light-skinned dolls over dark-skinned dolls.

== Scenes ==
"I don't like to be called black because I'm not black," were the opening words of a young African American girl at the beginning of Dark Girls. The documentary explores the many struggles, including self-esteem issues, which women of darker skin face as a result of the colorism they have experienced, allowing women of all ages to recount "the damage done to their self-esteem and their constant feeling of being devalued and disregarded.”(Haque)

Duke and Berry take it a step further and interview different groups of African Americans to get an insight on dating preferences in the African American community. One young man interviewed said, “They [dark girls] look funny beside me.” The social conditioning that African Americans have been put through often results in fairer complexions being preferred over darker ones.

== Other aspects of documentary ==
The documentary takes a look into the trend of skin bleaching, a multi-billion dollar business in which various people around the world contribute to with the belief that being lighter will bring about an overall better life. Duke and Berry also examine how black women are trying to look more Caucasian while white women are trying to look more ethnic. “White women are risking skin cancer and tanning booths twice a week, botoxing their lips, getting butt lifts to look more ethnic and crinkling up their hair.”

== Impact ==
The film was shown to a sell-out crowd at the Pan African Film Festival in Los Angeles, April 2012. In an interview on NPR, Duke recounted a reaction he received at another showing which indicated that colorism is not easily discussed. He was asked, "Why are you airing our dirty laundry?" His answer was, "Because it's stinkin' up the house!"

In another 2015 interview with the Los Angeles Times, he described the purpose of the documentary as giving “a voice to the voiceless.”

The Association of Black Psychologists wrote, "Dark Girls gives us an opportunity to take a soul-searching look at the effects of racism on the self-image of Black women personally and collectively, particularly as it relates to complexion, so that where healing is needed, we can heal; where our tools for resilience and defying the lie protected us, we can lift them up for celebration and increased use."

== Sequel ==
On May 21, 2020 it was announced that a sequel documentary titled Dark Girls 2 will premiere on June 30, 2020 on the Oprah Winfrey Network.

== See also ==
- A Girl Like Me (film)
