= Helen Martin =

American actress (1909–2000)

- Born: Helen Dorothy Martin; July 23, 1909; St. Louis, Missouri, U.S.
- Died: March 25, 2000 (aged 90); Monterey, California, U.S.
- Occupation: Actress
- Years active: 1937–2000
- Known for: Wanda – Good Times; Pearl Shay – 227

Helen Dorothy Martin (July 23, 1909 – March 25, 2000) was an American actress of stage and television. Martin's career spanned over 60 years, appearing first on stage and later in film and television. Martin is best known for her roles as Wanda Williams on the CBS sitcom Good Times (1974–1979) and as Pearl Shay on the NBC sitcom 227 (1985–1990).

== Biography ==
=== Early life and education ===
Martin was born in St. Louis and raised in Nashville, Tennessee. She was an only child born to a family of musicians. Martin's parents wanted their daughter to become a concert pianist. At the urging of her parents, Martin attended Fisk University for a two-year span before dropping out to embark on an acting career. During the Great Depression, Martin supported herself as a domestic worker.

=== Career ===
After leaving college, Martin moved to Chicago, and New York City thereafter to study acting with the WPA Theater and the Rose McClendon Players. She was a founding member of the American Negro Theater in Harlem. Martin became a Broadway character actress for many decades, debuting in 'Orchids Preferred' in 1937 and thereafter Orson Welles's production of Native Son in 1941.

Martin appeared in a dozen Broadway shows, including Jean Genet's The Blacks, the musical Raisin from 1973 until 1975, Ossie Davis's Purlie Victorious (and later the musical version, which was called Purlie), The Amen Corner and Tennessee Williams's Period of Adjustment.

Martin became widely known later in life due to her roles in popular television series, which brought her a large audience. She had a recurring role as Wanda "Weeping Wanda" Williams on the television series Good Times, and later as the neighbor Pearl Shay on the television sitcom 227, which lasted from 1985 until 1990. Martin also had a role on the short-lived sitcoms Baby, I'm Back (as mother in-law, Luzelle) and That's My Mama. Martin portrayed a variety of grandmothers in films: Hollywood Shuffle (1987), Don't Be a Menace to South Central While Drinking Your Juice in the Hood (1996), I Got the Hook Up (1998), House Party 2 (1991), and Mama Doll in Bulworth (1998).

While appearing on Late Night with Conan O'Brien to promote Don't Be a Menace, Martin sent host Conan O'Brien and the audience into a frenzy with her remark, "I love reefer!" in response to a question about being cast as a pot-smoking grandmother in the film. She also said she would have been a stripper had she not gone into acting and followed her statement with a suggestive dance.

=== Death ===
Martin died of a heart attack on March 25, 2000, in Monterey, California, at the age of 90.

== Filmography ==
- 1955 The Phenix City Story as Helen Ward
- 1961 Frontiers of Faith (TV series, 1 episode) as Unknown
- 1969 J.T. (TV Movie) as Mrs. Hill
- 1970 Cotton Comes to Harlem as Church Sister
- 1970 Where's Poppa? as Second Job Applicant
- 1971 The Anderson Tapes as Minor Role (uncredited)
- 1973 Big Daddy (TV Movie) as Unknown
- 1973-1974 Maude (TV Series, 2 episodes) as Stella
- 1974 Death Wish as Alma Lee Brown
- 1974-1979 Good Times (TV Series, 7 episodes) as Wanda
- 1975 That's My Mama (TV Series, 6 episodes) as Laura
- 1976-1979 What's Happening!! (TV Series) as Millie / Mrs. Lloyd
- 1976-1977 Sanford and Son (TV Series) as Millie / Nurse / Church Sister #1 / Lady #1
- 1977 Insight (TV Series, 1 episode) as Bessie
- 1977 Starsky and Hutch (TV Series, 2 episodes) as Nellie 'Dirty Nellie' / Vivian Fellers
- 1978 Baby, I'm Back (TV Series, 13 episodes) as Luzelle Carter
- 1978 A Hero Ain't Nothin' but a Sandwich as Mrs. Bell
- 1978 Cindy (TV Movie) as Flower Lady
- 1979 Lawman Without a Gun (TV Movie) as Mrs. Cartwright
- 1979 Dummy (TV Movie) as Mrs. Harrod
- 1979 Better Late Than Never (TV Movie) as Unknown
- 1980 The Stockard Channing Show (TV Series, 1 episode) as Maid
- 1980-1981 The White Shadow as Louise / Old Woman
- 1981-1983 Hill Street Blues as Neighbor / Woman Onlooker
- 1982 T.J. Hooker (TV Series,1 episode) as Mrs. Sears
- 1982 Wacko as Harbinger's Mother
- 1983 Alice (TV Series, 1 episode) as Customer
- 1983 The Jeffersons (TV Series, 1 episode) as Alice
- 1983 Deal of the Century as Baptist #3
- 1984 Hardcastle and McCormick (TV Series, 1 episode) as Mrs. Prufrock
- 1984 The Jerk, Too (TV Movie) as Grandma Johnson
- 1984 St. Elsewhere (TV Series, 1 episode) as Elderly Lady
- 1984 Repo Man as Mrs. Parks
- 1984 Benson (TV Series) as Benson's Aunt Lil episode "the reunion"
- 1985-1990 227 (TV Series, 116 episodes) as Pearl Shay
- 1985 Amos (TV Movie) as Mrs. McKenzie
- 1987 Hollywood Shuffle as Bobby's Grandmother
- 1989 A Raisin in the Sun (TV Movie) as Mrs. Johnson
- 1989 Full House (TV Series, 1 episode) as Shirley
- 1989 Jackée (TV Series) as Pearl Shay
- 1990 Night Angel as Sadie
- 1990 The Flash (TV Series, 1 episode) as Sadie Grosso
- 1991 A Rage in Harlem as Mrs. Canfield
- 1991 Doc Hollywood as Maddie, Welcoming Committee
- 1991 House Party 2 as Mrs. Deevers
- 1993 The Pitch (Short) as Old Woman
- 1994 Beverly Hills Cop III as Grandma
- 1995 The Parent 'Hood (TV Series, 1 episode) as Ms. Morris
- 1995 The Wayans Bros. (TV Series, 1 episode) as Mother Evans
- 1996 Don't Be a Menace to South Central While Drinking Your Juice in the Hood as Loc Dog's Grandma
- 1997 Kiss the Girls as Nana Cross
- 1997 I'm Bout It (V) as Mrs. Alberta
- 1998 The Jamie Foxx Show (TV Series, 1 episode) as Mother Superior
- 1998 Since You've Been Gone (TV Movie) as Old Lady
- 1998 Bulworth as Momma Doll
- 1998 I Got the Hook Up (aka I Got the Hook-Up (USA: review title)) as Grandmother
- 1999 At Face Value (Short) as Miss Ella
- 2000 Something to Sing About (TV Movie) as Elderly woman (final film role)

== Stage work ==
- 1937: Orchids Preferred .... Evy
- 1941: Native Son .... Vera Thomas
- 1945: Deep Are the Roots .... Honey Turner
- 1953: Take a Giant Step .... Poppy
- 1960: The Long Dream .... Maude Carter
- 1960: Period of Adjustment .... Susie
- 1960: The Blacks ....
- 1961: Purlie Victorious .... Missy Judson
- 1963: My Mother, My Father and Me .... Hannah
- 1965: The Amen Corner .... Sister Douglas
- 1967: Something Different .... Sarah Goldfine
- 1970: Purlie .... Idelia
- 1973: Raisin .... Mrs. Johnson
