= Harlem Detective series =

Novel series by Chester Himes

The Harlem Detective series of novels by Chester Himes comprises nine hardboiled novels set in the 1950s and early 1960s:

== List of novels ==
- For Love of Imabelle, a.k.a. A Rage in Harlem
- The Real Cool Killers
- The Crazy Kill
- The Big Gold Dream
- All Shot Up
- Cotton Comes to Harlem
- The Heat's On
- Blind Man With a Pistol
- Plan B (unfinished)

== Background ==
By 1954, Chester Himes was living in Paris, France, where he enjoyed the intellectual milieu and lack of racism. His writings and novels were well-respected, but they did not provide enough income on which to live. He met Marcel Duhamel, the editor of Série noire (The Black Series), which had popularized American hardboiled detective writing in France. The name of the series referred to the color of the books' covers, which was solid black (the association of that word with both the covers and the dark content therein would be a factor when a group of French aficionados of American crime movies famously coined the term "film noir". To solve Himes' problem, Duhamel suggested he turn to writing detective fiction. Himes complained that he did not know how, but Duhamel told him to simply start with a bizarre incident and see where that took him, while emulating the terse writing style of Dashiell Hammett and Raymond Chandler. Although Himes considered his first attempt a "potboiler" and hoped to return to more serious writing, he would eventually state that his first book in his detective series was a "masterpiece".

The first novel in the Harlem Detective series was actually published in America first, in 1957 for Fawcett with the title For Love of Imabelle, then in France in The Serie Noire for publisher Gallimard with the title La Reine de Pommes (The Queen of Apples). It would later also be published under the title A Rage in Harlem. The nine books in the series have been published in at least 132 editions around the world in eight different languages.

== Analysis ==
Their protagonists are two black NYPD detectives (whose origins can be traced to a short story Himes published (1933) in Abbott's Monthly Magazine) — Grave Digger Jones and Coffin Ed Johnson — whose names suggest the nature of their police methods and reputation. Jones and Johnson generally go easy with, and even tolerate, numbers operators, madames, whores, and gamblers; but they are extremely hostile to violent criminals, drug dealers, confidence tricksters and pimps. Himes says that they are tough, "but they never came down hard on anybody that was in the right".

One reviewer states:

Himes's two Harlem detectives are mythic heroes of sorts—indomitable forces of nature, their status as heavy-handed enforcers for the Man elevated to Harlem legends. So pervasive is the legend that their presence isn't needed to inspire awe or fear, mention of their name is enough. They are the law, the Man, the "mens", also a law onto themselves, using extralegal means to induce compliance.

The "extralegal means" frequently include physical brutality in the case of men suspected of violent crime, and psychological torture and intimidation with women who withhold information, such as when Grave Digger threatens to pistol-whip a woman "until no man will ever look at you again" (A Rage in Harlem), or strips another woman naked, tying her up, and making a hairline incision across her neck with a razor, then forcing her to look at the blood in a mirror.

Himes attempts to portray this brutality in such a way that the reader does not wholly lose sympathy with the detectives. For example, in the throat-cutting incident, the woman was a key witness in a case where a young girl was being held hostage and threatened with death by a street gang, and Himes says of Grave Digger's actions: "He knew what he had done was unforgivable, but he couldn't stand any more lies". Jones and Johnson get away with these methods because they manage to solve high-profile cases under great pressure and because the victims of their brutality always either get killed off by other criminals, or are found to be implicated in serious crimes themselves.

Notwithstanding the above, Grave Digger and Coffin Ed have deep and genuine sympathy for the innocent victims of crime. “In Himes’s portrayal, they frequently intervene to protect black residents from arbitrary brutality by white police officers. Finally, the detectives seem sympathetic because they are under constant pressure to prove themselves, as the only black detectives in a precinct where the other cops are openly racist; and the flip side of their brutality is their willingness to put their own reputations and their own lives on the line whenever the interests of justice require it.

There is abundant, and effective, use of "black" (i.e., macabre) humor to lighten the mood of the stories, and they also contain many interesting sidelights touching on subjects as diverse as political corruption, jazz, soul food, and the sexual underside of Harlem life in that era.

== Adaptations ==
Three films have been based upon novels in this series: Cotton Comes to Harlem (1970), Come Back, Charleston Blue (1972), based upon The Heat's On, and A Rage in Harlem (1991).
