= Plan B (novel) =

Posthumously published novel by Chester Himes

First American edition (publ. University Press of Mississippi)

Plan B is an unfinished novel by Chester Himes (1909–1984), begun in 1967 or 1968, that was completed from his notes by Michel Fabre and Robert E. Skinner. It was published posthumously in America in 1993 by the University Press of Mississippi, edited and with an Introduction by Fabre and Skinner, as the final volume in the Harlem Detective series of novels by Himes. The story is even darker and more nihilistic than the preceding volumes in the cycle, culminating in a violent revolutionary movement in the streets of America. According to The Washington Post review, "As it stands, beneath the humor 'Plan B' is an honest, uncompromising look at race and race relations, as meaningful today as the day it was written."

The first edition of Plan B was published in France, in 1983 (Éditions lieu commun), translated by Helène Devaux-Minié.

== Plot summary ==
The story differs somewhat from the other volumes of the cycle in being less a detective story and more a surrealistic tale of a racial apocalypse in America. The story hinges on the efforts of community leader Tomsson Black to stir up racial tension in Harlem in order to force a radical change in race relations. The novel begins as a hardboiled detective story, then, when the characters' revolt begins, transitions to apocalyptic fiction.

== Major themes ==
In an interview, Himes once noted that he had wanted to "depict the violence that is necessary so that the white community will also give it a little thought, because you know, they're going around playing these games. They haven't given any thought to what would happen if the black people would seriously uprise."

Most notably, Plan B features the death of both of the protagonists of the Harlem Cycle. Gravedigger Jones kills Coffin Ed Johnson in a dramatic final scene, before being killed himself by Tomsson Black. Throughout the story, the usually level-headed Gravedigger gets caught up in the revolutionary fervor, while Coffin Ed is uncharacteristically skeptical and calm.
