= Raymond St. Jacques =

American actor, director and producer (1930–1990)

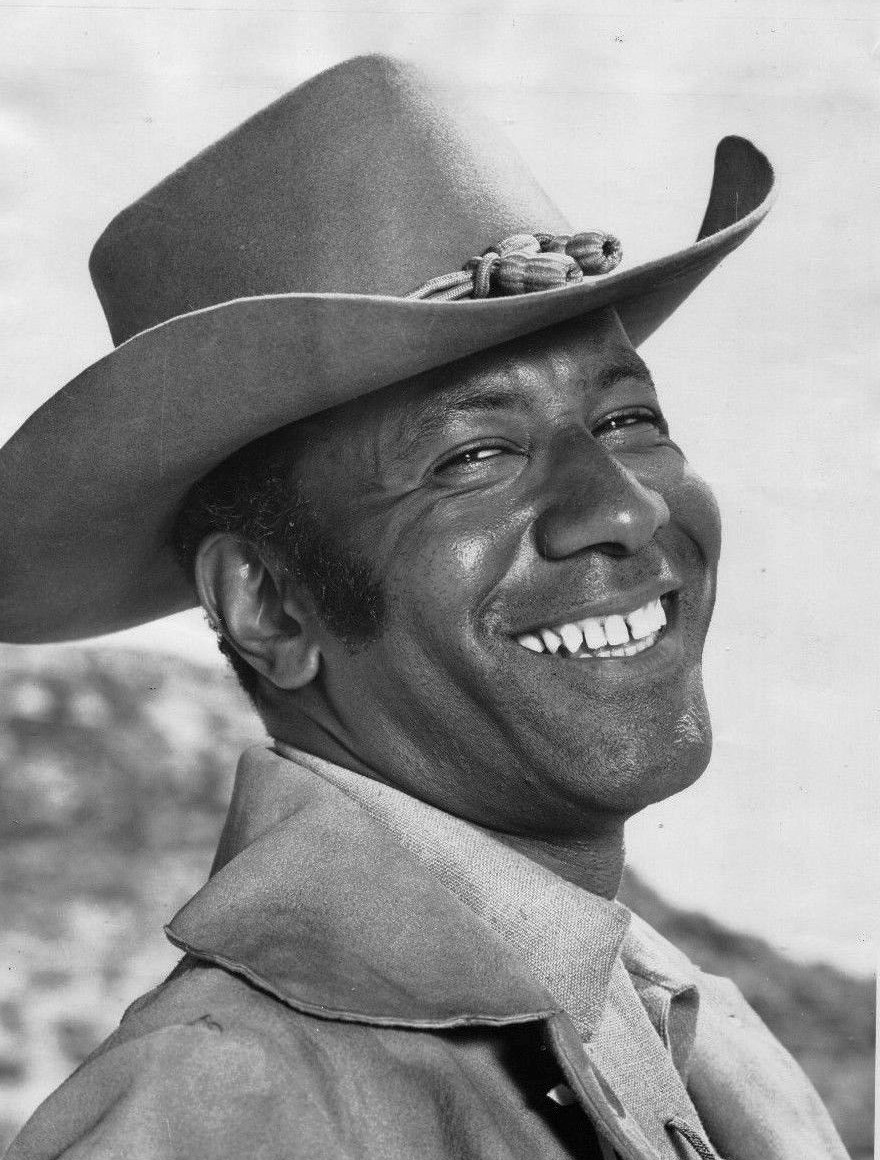
- St. Jacques in Rawhide, 1965
- Born: James Arthur Johnson; March 1, 1930; Hartford, Connecticut, U.S.
- Died: August 27, 1990 (aged 60); Los Angeles, California, U.S.
- Resting place: Forest Lawn Memorial Park (Los Angeles, California)
- Education: Hillhouse High School; Yale University
- Occupations: Actor; director; producer
- Years active: 1959–1990
- Known for: Rawhide (as Simon Blake); Coffin Ed Johnson – Cotton Comes to Harlem, Come Back, Charleston Blue
- Children: 2, including Sterling St. Jacques

Raymond St. Jacques (born James Arthur Johnson; March 1, 1930 – August 27, 1990) was an American actor, director and producer whose career spanned over thirty years on stage, film and television. St. Jacques is noted as the first Black actor to appear in a regular role on a Western series. He portrayed Simon Blake on the eighth season of Rawhide (1965–1966).

== Early life and education ==
St. Jacques was born James Arthur Johnson in Hartford, Connecticut. He had a sister, Barbara Ann. Shortly after his birth, his parents divorced; he moved with his mother and sister to New Haven, Connecticut. St. Jacques' mother Vivienne later worked as a medical technician at Yale University.

After graduating from Hillhouse High School, St. Jacques attended Yale, where he studied drama and psychology. Upon graduation, he worked as an assistant director, actor and fencing instructor for the American Shakespearean Festival in New Haven. St. Jacques staged all of the fencing scenes and duels while at the company. He continued to practice fencing for the rest of his life.

After moving to New York City, St. Jacques continued to pursue acting and studied at the Actors Studio. To support himself, he worked as a model, dishwasher, and busboy.

St. Jacques's first professional acting role was in the off-Broadway play High Name Today. St. Jacques was cast in the role of "Judge" in the off-Broadway performance of Jean Genet's play The Blacks at St. Mark's Playhouse in 1960.

== Career ==
After appearing in bit parts on television in the early 1960s, St. Jacques made his film debut in a small part in the 1964 film Black Like Me. He followed with a villianous role in The Pawnbroker later that year. He appeared in supporting roles in The Comedians (1967) and The Green Berets (1968).

During the 1960s, St. Jacques also guest starred on numerous television shows, including East Side/West Side, Daktari, The Virginian, and The Man from U.N.C.L.E.. In 1965, he was cast as "Simon Blake" in the Western series Rawhide, the first African-American actor to be cast as a regular on a prime time Western series.

St. Jacques's best-known film roles were that of Coffin Ed in the blaxploitation classics Cotton Comes to Harlem (1970) (adapted from crime novels by Chester Himes) and Come Back, Charleston Blue (1972). In the early 1970s, St. Jacques began teaching fencing and acting at the Mafundi Institute in Watts, Los Angeles. In 1973, he produced, directed, and starred in the crime film Book of Numbers.

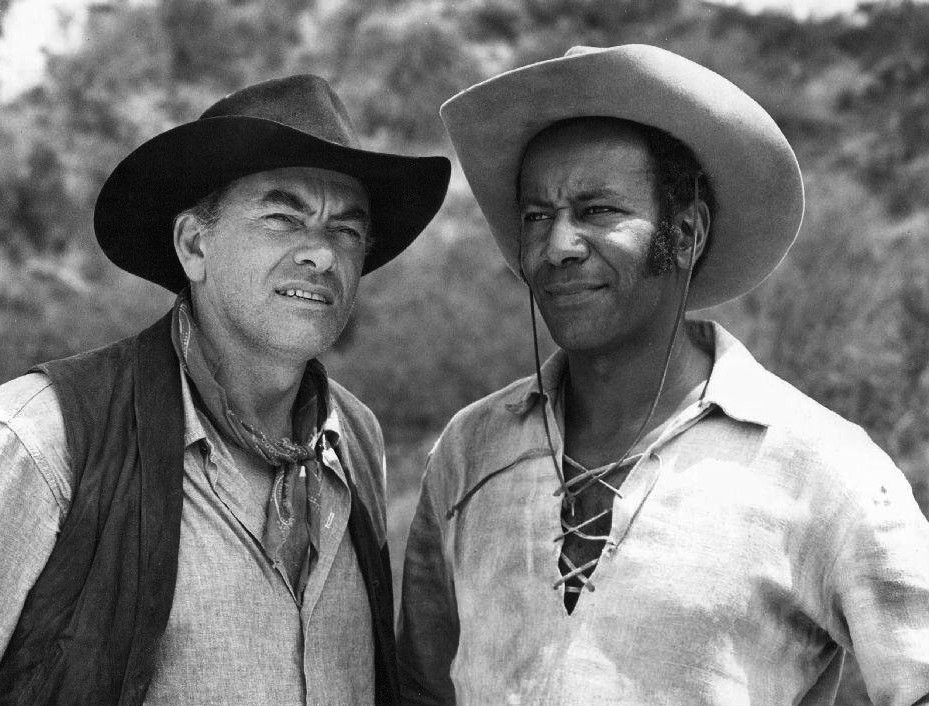
St. Jacques (right) with John Ireland in Rawhide, 1965

Throughout the 1960s and 1970s, St. Jacques continued with roles on stage, film and television. He became known as "The Man of a Thousand Faces" due to the varied parts he played throughout his career. In 1976, St. Jacques starred as Othello in the John Anson Ford Amphitheatre production of the play of the same name. He remained active in stage work throughout his career, touring in productions of Julius Caesar, Romeo and Juliet, A Raisin in the Sun, and the stage adaptation of The Man with the Golden Arm.

From 1988 to 1989, St. Jacques had a two-year stint as Judge Clayton C. Thomas on the syndicated TV show Superior Court. In 1989, he played abolitionist Frederick Douglass in Edward Zwick's film Glory. His final film role was in the 1991 science fiction film Timebomb, released after his death.

== Personal life ==
St. Jacques was a lifelong bachelor. In August 1969, St. Jacques granted an interview to columnist Earl Wilson and told Wilson of his plans to adopt two African-American boys who were six and seven years old.

By the early 1970s, St. Jacques said he had two older sons, Raymond, Jr and Sterling, the latter being adopted. In a 1973 interview, St. Jacques said that Raymond, Jr was living in Boston. In May 1972, Sterling, then reported to be 22 years old, made news after four men attempted to rob St. Jacques's Bel Air home while St. Jacques was in Dallas. Sterling was reported to be the only person home at the time, and fled after calling police. The four men were apprehended after their getaway car stalled in St. Jacques's driveway.

Sterling appeared in St. Jacques's 1973 film Book of Numbers. In the mid to late 1970s, he became known as a high fashion model. He was briefly engaged to fashion model Pat Cleveland. He also worked as a dancer and as a frequent figure in New York City nightclubs and society life. In her 2016 memoir Walking with Muses, Cleveland said that their engagement ended because Sterling was gay. According to Cleveland's memoir, Sterling St Jacques died of complications of AIDS in 1992. (His death has never been officially confirmed.)

In a 1988 interview with the Chicago Tribune, St. Jacques still said he had two sons and that Sterling was appearing on a television show in Düsseldorf.

== Activism ==
St. Jacques frequently spoke of the prejudices he and other black actors faced and difficulties in getting roles as non-stereotypical, thoughtful characters. He later worked to help African Americans find work behind the camera. In 1977, he publicly criticized the lack of minority actors in Star Wars (which he said he saw five times) and other science fiction films.

St. Jacques was an activist for African-American civil rights. In 1985, he and other protestors were arrested during an anti-apartheid demonstration outside of the South African embassy in Washington, D.C.

== Death ==
On August 27, 1990, St. Jacques died of lymphoma at Cedars-Sinai Medical Center in Los Angeles, California. His funeral was held on August 31 at The Church of the Recessional at Forest Lawn Memorial Park in Glendale, after which he was interred at Forest Lawn Memorial Park, Hollywood Hills.

== Filmography ==
Year	Title	Role	Notes
1963	East Side/West Side	Dr. Warren	Season 1, Episode 6 "No Wings at All"
1964	Black Like Me	Burial Insurance Salesman	
1964	The Pawnbroker	Tangee	
1964	Dr. Kildare	Dr. Hassan	S4:E12 "Catch a Crooked Mouse"
1965	Slattery's People	Bud Rollins	Season 1, Episode 18 "Question: How Do You Catch a Cool Bird of Paradise?"
1965	Mister Moses	Ubi	
1965	Rawhide	Simon Blake	13 episodes
1966	Mister Buddwing	Hank	
1966	Daktari	Emir of Asambana	Season 2, Episode 5 "Cheetah at Large"
1966	I Spy	Edward, Prince Edward	Season 2, Episode 6 "Trial by Treehouse"
1966	The Virginian	Allerton	S5:E8 "Trail to Ashley Mountain"
1966	Daniel Boone	Nimrod	Season 3, Episode 8 "Onatha"
1966	The Girl from U.N.C.L.E.	Big Feets Charley	S1:E10 "The Paradise Lost Affair"
1966	The Man from U.N.C.L.E.	Arunda	S3:E14 "The My Friend the Gorilla Affair"
1967	The Green Hornet	Hollis Silver	S1:E16 "Seek, Stalk, and Destroy"
1967	The Comedians	Captain Concasseur	
1968	Tarzan	Walter Wilson	S2:E16 "The Creeping Giant"
1968	The Invaders	James A. Baxter	Season 2, Episode 22 "The Vise"
1968	Madigan	Dr. Taylor	
1968	The Green Berets	Sgt. Doc McGee	
1968	If He Hollers, Let Him Go!	James Lake	
1968	The Name of the Game	Lieutenant Ross Cutler	S1:E13 "The Black Answer"
1968	Uptight	B.G.	
1969	Change of Mind	David Rowe	
1969	The Monk	Lieutenant Edward Heritage	
1970	Cotton Comes to Harlem	Coffin Ed Johnson	
1970	Dan August	Jimmy Barlowe	Season 1, Episode 6 "The Color of Fury"
1971	Neighbors	Bill Gunther	
1972	Cool Breeze	Bill Mercer	
1972	The Final Comedown	Imir	
1972	Come Back, Charleston Blue	Coffin Ed Johnson	
1973	Book of Numbers	Blueboy Harris	
1973	Police Story	Charlie Sykes	S1:E5 "The Ho Chi Minh Trail"
1974	Lost in the Stars	John Kumalo	
1974	Police Story	Chris Massey	Season 2, Episode 9 "Love, Mabel"
1975	Search for the Gods	Raymond Stryker	
1975	McCloud	Gregory	S6:E1 "Park Avenue Pirates"
1975	The Rookies	Hank Brooks	Season 4, Episode 6 "Reign of Terror"
1975	Police Story	Floyd	S3:E5 "The Cut Man Caper"
1976	Police Woman	Alex Steeves	S2:E19 "Wednesday's Child"
1976	Gemini Man	Hali Jamada	S1:E10 "Return of the Lion"
1977	Hunter	Sebastian	S1:E11 "The Chand is Burning"
1977	Roots	The Drummer	TV Mini-Series, Episode: "Part IV"
1977	The Andros Targets	Raymond Peters	S1:E5 "A Labor Czar Is Missing"
1977	The Bionic Woman	Azzar	S3:E6 "African Connection"
1977	Little House on the Prairie	Manager L. Moody	Season 4, Episode 10 "The Fighter"
1977	The Private Files of J. Edgar Hoover	Martin Luther King	
1977	The Baron	Peter Mosten	
1978	Secrets of Three Hungry Wives	Detective Inspector George Dunbar	
1978	Born Again	Jimmy Newsom	
1978	Vega$	Lieutenant Nelson	Season 1, Episode 7 "Milliken's Stash"
1979	Quincy, M.E.	Dr. Charles Martin	S4:E12 "A Small Circle of Friends"
1979	Wonder Woman	William Mayfield	S3:E19 "The Girl with a Gift for Disaster"
1979	Hizzonner	Mayor Bacuda	Season 1, Episode 5 "The Book Story"
1979	The 416th	Colonel Davis	
1979	B.J. and the Bear	Bobby	S2:E7 "The Eyes of Texas"
1980	Cuba Crossing	Mr. Bell	
1980	House Calls	Arlan Lewis	Season 1, Episode 7 "Mobster Tale"
1980	Insight	Colonel Bokatu	Episode "Cargoes"
1981	Enos	Davis Burton	S1:E7 "The House Cleaners"
1981	Hart to Hart	Laurance Roche	S2:E15 "Getting Aweigh with Murder"
1981	The Sophisticated Gents	D'Artagnan 'Dart' Parks	TV Mini-Series, 3 episodes
1981	Fantasy Island	Camptown Dodds	S4:E21, segment "Basin Street"
1982	Strike Force	Ed Ortega	Season 1, Episode 14 "Turnabout"
1982	Fantasy Island	Dupres	S6:E1, segment "Curse of the Moreaus"
1982	Gavilan	Ki-Tai DuChamp	S1:E1 "Sarah and the Buzz"
1983	Voyagers!	Massandi	S1:E12 "Buffalo Bill and Annie Play the Palace"
1983	The Powers of Matthew Star	Wolfson	Season 1, Episode 15 "Dead Man's Hand"
1983	Matt Houston	Psychiatrist	Season 1, Episode 15 "Get Houston"
1983	Trapper John, M.D.	Dr. Riggs Martin	Season 5, Episode 6 "The Final Cut"
1983	Falcon Crest	Dr. Arthur Hooks	7 episodes
1983	The Love Boat	Tom Niver	Season 6, Episode 16 "Doc's Big Case/Senior Sinners/A Booming Romance"
1984	The Evil That Men Do	Randolph	
1984	Airwolf	President Seko Logana	Season 1, Episode 9 "And They Are Us"
1984	Cagney & Lacey	Jim Driscoll	Season 4, Episode 9 "Hooked"
1984	The Fall Guy	Tom Riley	Season 3, Episode 15 "Bite of the Wasp"
1984	Murder, She Wrote	Doctor	S1:E1 "The Murder of Sherlock Holmes"
1985	The Fall Guy	Ed Simmons	Season 4, Episode 20 "Spring Break"
1985	Hardcastle and McCormick	Rod Frazier	S2:E20 "Undercover McCormick"
1985	Murder, She Wrote	Chief Inspector Claude Rensselaer	S2:E1 "Widow, Weep for Me"
1985	The Love Boat	Ramon	Season 9, Episode 3 "Hidden Treasure/Picture from the Past/Ace's Salary"
1986	Dallas	Inspector Remy	Season 9, Episode 25 "Just Desserts"
1986	Dark Mansions	Davis	
1986	227	Mr. Hatcher	Season 2, Episode 6 "Pillow Talk"
1986	Amen	Jason Adderly	Season 1, Episode 8 "Maitre D'eacon"
1986	Amen	Mr. Waters	Season 1, Episode 10 "After the Fall"
1987	Starman	Judge Arthur Richardson	Season 1, Episode 12 "The System"
1987	Hunter	Judge Clancy	Season 3, Episode 18 "A Child Is Born"
1987	The Wild Pair	Ivory	
1988	A Different World	Professor Charles Moseley	Season 1, Episode 14 "Wild Child"
1988	They Live	Street Preacher	
1988-1989	Superior Court	Judge Clayton C. Thomas	3 episodes
1989	MacGyver	President Dakru	Season 4, Episode 16 "Brainwashed"
1989	Snoops	General Ben Martin	S1:E3 "The Big Brass Cookie Jar"
1989	Glory	Frederick Douglass	Uncredited
1991	Voodoo Dawn	Claude	Released posthumously
1991	Timebomb	Det. Sanchez	Released posthumously
