= Cotton Comes to Harlem =

1970 American action film by Ossie Davis

- Theatrical release poster by Robert McGinnis
- Directed by: Ossie Davis
- Written by: Ossie Davis; Arnold Perl
- Based on: Cotton Comes to Harlem by Chester Himes
- Produced by: Samuel Goldwyn Jr.
- Starring: Godfrey Cambridge; Raymond St. Jacques; Calvin Lockhart
- Cinematography: Gerald Hirschfeld
- Edited by: Robert Q. Lovett
- Music by: Galt MacDermot
- Production company: Formosa Productions
- Distributed by: United Artists
- Release date: May 27, 1970
- Running time: 97 minutes
- Country: United States
- Language: English
- Budget: $1.2 million
- Box office: $5.2 million (rentals)

Cotton Comes to Harlem is a 1970 American neo-noir action comedy film co-written and directed by Ossie Davis and starring Godfrey Cambridge, Raymond St. Jacques, and Redd Foxx. The film, later cited as an early example of the blaxploitation genre, is based on Chester Himes' novel of the same name.

The opening theme, "Ain't Now But It's Gonna Be", was written by Ossie Davis and performed by Melba Moore. The film was one of the many black films that appeared in the 1970s and became overnight hits. It was followed two years later by the sequel Come Back, Charleston Blue (1972).

== Plot ==
Deke "Reverend" O'Malley, a con man, is selling shares at a Harlem rally, for the purchase of a Back-to-Africa movement ship to be called The Black Beauty. During the rally, several masked gunmen jump out of a meat truck and steal $87,000 in donated cash from the back of an armored car. Two Harlem detectives, "Gravedigger" Jones and "Coffin Ed" Johnson, chase the car, and a bale of cotton falls out of the vehicle, unremarked at the time.

Though the authorities approve of O'Malley, regarding his "Back-to-Africa" movement as a way to solve American racial problems, both Jones and even more so Johnson are hostile towards him, viewing him as a charlatan who is exploiting the impoverished black community of Harlem. Captain Bryce—who has a portrait of Richard Nixon prominently displayed in his office—tells Jones and Johnson not to treat O'Malley as a suspect, orders that the duo ignore.

Jones and Johnson go to the apartment of Iris Brown, O'Malley's mistress, believing he will come to see her at some point, but are called away. Iris is able to escape from the policeman sent to guard her. Iris is shocked to discover O'Malley seducing Mabel Hill, the widow of one of his subordinates killed in the robbery, leading to a fight between the two women and Iris being disillusioned with O'Malley.

Uncle Budd, a scavenger, finds the bale of cotton and sells it for $25 to a junk dealer, but later buys it back for $30. There is a reward out for the $87,000, and Gravedigger and Coffin deduce that the money was hidden inside the bale that fell out of the getaway vehicle during the chase, leading to a violent search as rival gangsters seek the money.

Iris tells Jones and Johnson the truth—namely that the robbery was part of a plan to allow O'Malley to steal the money without discrediting himself, but that he was double-crossed by his partner Calhoun, a white career criminal whom he met in prison who decided to take the money for himself. Calhoun kidnaps Iris to torture her for information about where the bale is, but after a shoot-out, Jones and Johnson rescue her.

At a theater in Harlem, Iris's friend, the dancer Billie, uses the bale of cotton as part of her act, which attracts both Calhoun and O'Malley to the theater. Jones and Johnson arrest and humiliate Calhoun—who was dressed in blackface—at the theater. In the back of the theater, Johnson beats O'Malley in a fight. Jones and Johnson expose the Reverend O’Malley to the audience of the theater as the fraud that he is, remarking that he could have been another Marcus Garvey or Malcolm X, but instead he chose to be just a petty conman who exploited ordinary people.

As O'Malley begs for support, the audience turn their backs on him and walks out. Detectives Jones and Johnson then blackmail Tom, a white mob leader, to give them $87,000 — to be restored to the original donors — after discovering that Uncle Budd has run off with the stolen money and emigrated to Ghana, to live in retirement with his ill-gotten gains and a harem.

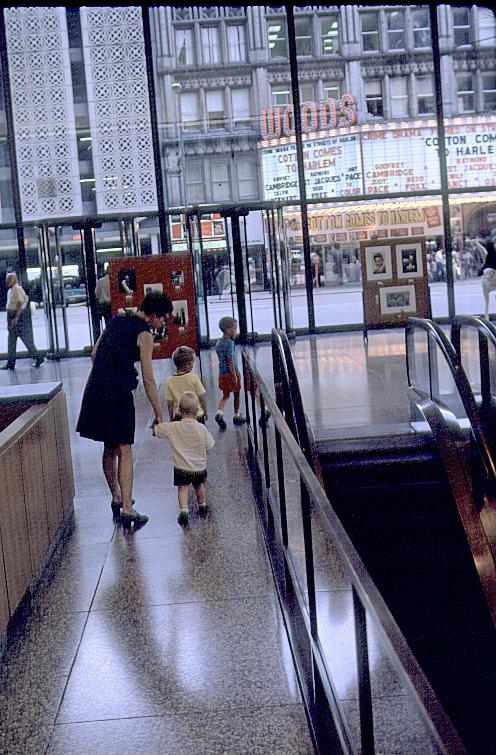
A showing of Cotton Comes to Harlem at the Woods Theatre, Chicago, 1970

== Cast ==
- Godfrey Cambridge as Detective "Gravedigger" Jones
- Raymond St. Jacques as Detective Ed "Coffin Ed" Johnson
- Calvin Lockhart as Deke "Reverend" O'Malley
- Judy Pace as Iris Brown
- Redd Foxx as Uncle Budd / Booker Washington Sims
- Emily Yancy as Mabel
- John Anderson as Bryce
- Lou Jacobi as Goodman
- Eugene Roche as Anderson
- J.D. Cannon as Calhoun
- Mabel Robinson as Billie
- Dick Sabol as Jarema
- Helen Martin as Church Sister
- Cleavon Little as "Lo Boy"
- Theodore Wilson as Barry
- Leonardo Cimino as Tom
- Frederick O'Neal as Casper
- Don Bexley as Vendor In Crowd (uncredited)

== Production ==
Filmed between May and June 1969, Cotton Comes to Harlem employed many local residents as extras and crew in the Harlem neighborhood where it was filmed. This helped to put a positive spotlight on Harlem, which at the time was ravaged with crime.

Seeing that the film would be shot in Harlem, and featured large crowd scenes, such as riots and rallies, John Shabazz, a former bodyguard for Malcolm X and the so-called Black Citizens Patrol volunteered to control the scenes with their experience in keeping out unwanted spectators and policing traffic. The Black Citizens Patrol's purpose was to protect the black community from itself, so they made themselves available at all times, even operating as an escort service.

The film saw the debut of Calvin Lockhart, Judy Pace, and Cleavon Little. Another debut was by Redd Foxx, already well known as a veteran nightclub comic, leading him to be considered for the TV Show Sanford and Son.

Cambridge also starred as a white man who turns black in the motion picture comedy Watermelon Man, which opened the same day as Cotton Comes to Harlem.

Melba Moore, who sang the film's theme song, “Ain’t Now But It’s Gonna Be”, written by Ossie Davis, contemporaneously starred in the hit Broadway musical, Purlie!. Purlie, based on Davis' 1961 play Purlie Victorious, starred Cleavon Little and Moore, both of whom became Tony Award-winners for their performances in the play.

== Themes ==
Cotton Comes to Harlem is hailed by many as the first blaxploitation film, although others felt that it was merely an action comedy film. Detectives Gravedigger and Coffin Ed do not always follow the rules. They are not necessarily fighting to protect the rule of law, but they try to protect their people from racist attitudes.

Cotton Comes to Harlem made reference to Black Power, by depicting tools such as self-determination. The detectives work throughout the movie to prove that the black community was being taken advantage of. By the end of the film, they gain the respect of white officers and are able to demand $87,000 from the white mafioso who runs the Harlem rackets, which they use to replace the money stolen at the beginning of the film.

== Reception ==
=== Critical response ===
Film critic Vincent Canby of The New York Times was unimpressed with the film, writing:

'Balloons, fans, feathers—they're all out of style,' says the racially aware exotic dancer preparing her act for Harlem's Apollo Theater. 'They don't say a thing about my people!' [...] However, like the dancer's balloons, fans and feathers, the movie's stick-ups, shootouts, chases, murders and wisecracks say little about the Black Experience except that Ossie Davis, when given the opportunity, can turn out a ghetto comedy-melodrama that is almost as cold and witless as Gordon Douglas' Gold Coast fables, Tony Rome and Lady in Cement. It's strictly for people who don't care much about movies—or who persist in regarding movies as sociology."

In contrast, in retrospective reviews, Ken Hanke of the Mountain Xpress called Cotton Comes to Harlem "one of the earliest and best Blaxploitation films". Brian Orndorf of Blu-Ray.com wrote, "Harlem is mostly about the ride, with chases and barbed banter urging the movie along, keeping the whole endeavor light on its toes," giving the film a B+.

=== Box office ===
Cotton Comes to Harlem was released at the Woods Theatre in Chicago on May 27, 1970. The following week it opened at the Palms Theatre in Detroit before expanding a week later in New York City, Louisville, Milwaukee, Washington D.C., and a further theater in Detroit.

The film grossed $90,000 in its opening week, setting a house record at the Woods Theatre. After its third week it had grossed $506,000 from six cities, setting additional house records in New York and Detroit. Produced on a budget of $1.2 million, it earned $5.2 million in theatrical rentals during its North American release, making it the 25th highest-grossing film of 1970.

Cotton Comes to Harlem is one of the most commercially successful films Hollywood produced in the 1970s starring a predominantly black cast. The film was one of the many black films that appeared in the 1970s eventually becoming a cult classic. Cotton Comes to Harlem inspired more black films during the 1970s, including more action-packed numbers such as Shaft and Super Fly.

=== Home media ===
The film was released to DVD by 20th Century Fox Home Entertainment, acting as distributor for MGM Home Entertainment, in January 2001. Cotton Comes to Harlem was released on Blu-ray by Kino Lorber, under license from MGM, in September 2014.

== Sequel ==
Ossie Davis declined to direct a sequel to Cotton Comes to Harlem, due to strong artistic differences with Samuel Goldwyn, Jr. and his studio executives. The eventual sequel, Come Back, Charleston Blue, loosely based on Himes' The Heat's On, with much original material injected, ended up being directed by Mark Warren and was released in 1972 by Warner Bros. It opened to mixed reviews, with critics feeling it was decent, but not riotous like the original 1970 film.

== See also ==
- List of American films of 1970
