= Hitts & Mrs. =

2004 novel by Lori Bryant-Woolridge

Hitts & Mrs. (2004) is the second novel by Emmy-winning author Lori Bryant-Woolridge. It made the Essence Magazine bestseller list. Hitts & Mrs. built on the positive reviews and sales figures for Bryant-Woolridge's first book, Read Between the Lies.

== Edition ==
- HarperCollins Trade Paperback (January 2004), 367pp., ISBN 0-06-054059-1.
