= Benjamin Bryant (broadcaster) =

American writer, broadcaster, and filmmaker

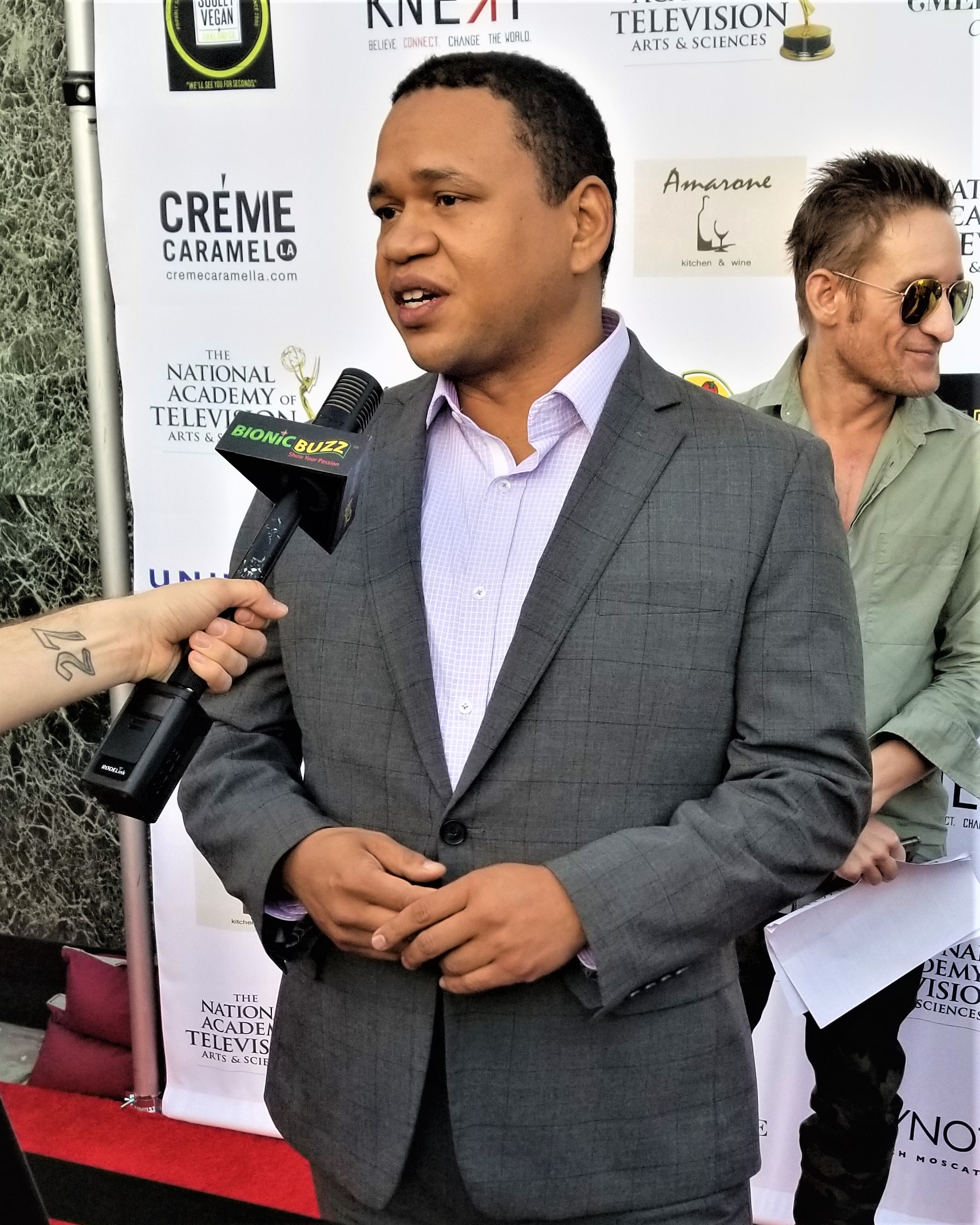
- Born: January 13, 1977 (age 49); Nuremberg, West Germany
- Citizenship: American
- Education: University of the Incarnate Word (MS, MA); Excelsior University (BS); University of Texas at Austin
- Occupations: writer, filmmaker
- Years active: 1996–present
- Organizations: Bryant Zamberlan Group; BZ/MP; United States Coast Guard Auxiliary
- Notable work: Fort Hood Shooting Task Force Report; Don't Ask, Don't Tell Repeal Report
- Father: Albert Bryant, Jr.
- Relatives: Lori Bryant-Woolridge

Benjamin Bryant (born January 13, 1977) is a Germany-born American broadcaster, writer, and Emmy-nominated filmmaker. A frequent civil servant, he has also worked as an artist and actor. During the Afghan evacuation in 2021, Bryant coordinated the emergency evacuation of Afghan allies and families, and served as a spokesperson for the "Digital Dunkirk" coalition.

Bryant produced the Vietnam veteran tribute special "Welcome Home! Honoring Your Legacy," for which he received a 2024 Capital Emmy Award nomination. He also wrote and directed the feature film Station to Station and sitcom "Aidy Kane (Really Wants You to Love Him)," co-executive produced the drama Anacostia, and hosts “The Brink with Benjamin Bryant.” As an actor, Bryant portrays "Gregory Marshall" on the serial Forever and a Day, a role for which he received a 2022 Indie Series Award.

Bryant served on the Pentagon’s Fort Hood Shooting Task Force, “Don't Ask, Don't Tell” Repeal Working Group, the Military Compensation and Retirement Modernization Commission, and the United States Vietnam War Commemoration. In 2011, the Dolph Briscoe Center for American History at the University of Texas at Austin announced the formal acquisition of several of Bryant's papers, notes, and recordings.

Bryant is a 2024 recipient of the Office of the Secretary of Defense Medal for Exceptional Public Service. In May 2025, Excelsior University announced Bryant will deliver the keynote commencement address to the graduating class of 2025.

== Early life and education ==
Bryant was born in Nuremberg, Germany to American parents in a military family. His father is Brigadier General Albert Bryant Jr. He is also the nephew of writer and speaker Lori Bryant-Woolridge.

As a result of his father's career, Bryant lived in many diverse locations as a child, including San Francisco, Washington D.C., and on Army posts in semi-rural Kansas, Kentucky, Louisiana, and Texas. After attending Leesville High School in Leesville, Louisiana and West Springfield High School in Springfield, Virginia, Bryant graduated from Giessen American High School in Giessen, Germany in 1994, and commenced study at the University of Texas at Austin that same year. At Texas, he studied journalism and communication studies from 1994 to 1998, before an extended illness led to medical withdrawal prior to graduation. Bryant completed his Bachelor of Science degree at New York’s Excelsior University.

In 2015, Bryant graduated with both a Master of Science in Organizational Development and Leadership, and a Master of Arts in Applied Administration, from the University of the Incarnate Word in San Antonio, Texas.

== Career ==
In 1996, Bryant was serving as a radio news intern at Austin radio station KKMJ when the Atlanta Olympic Bombing occurred. Following coverage of his impromptu overnight reporting by Austin American-Statesman columnist Jane Grieg, he was offered a regular on-air role at KKMJ and named Program Director for sister station, KJCE.

Bryant later worked as a freelance journalist and columnist before focusing on public relations and crisis communications consulting. He was a writer and editor for the Deepwater News and FHP&R: Force Health Protection & Readiness magazine. He returned to broadcasting as the host of the “BZCast” podcast in 2017, including an exploration of leaking and whistleblowing in the federal government, and in 2018, with “The Brink with Benjamin Bryant,” a series of one-on-one interviews focusing on Washington D.C. notables, and its spin-off serialized investigative podcast. In 2018, Bryant also appeared in a non-partisan public service announcement entitled "The One Place Everyone is Equal."

Between 2005 and 2009, Bryant served as a speechwriter for Rear Admiral Patrick Stillman of the United States Coast Guard, Ellen Embrey, then-Deputy Assistant Secretary of Defense for Force Health Protection and Readiness, and communications advisor for James Finley, then-Deputy Undersecretary of Defense for Acquisition and Technology during the George W. Bush administration.

From late 2009, Bryant's public service has primarily focused on high-profile task force and commission work. In 2009, he briefly supported the Congressional Wartime Contracting Commission effort as a contractor, before joining the Pentagon's Fort Hood Shooting Task Force in the aftermath of the November 2009 shooting. Subsequently, he served as editor-in-chief for the Pentagon's “Don't Ask, Don't Tell” Repeal Working Group, led a Pandemic Influenza Program Assessment for the City of Virginia Beach, and served as a senior team lead for Military Compensation and Retirement Modernization Commission (for which he also served as the agency's final spokesperson).

During this time, Bryant made multiple appearances on America Tonight speaking to military issues in the news, and in 2011, news reports covered Bryant and Thomas Zamberlan's donation of their original editor's copies from several Presidential and DoD task forces to the Smithsonian Institution. That same year, the Dolph Briscoe Center for American History at Bryant's alma mater University of Texas at Austin, acquired Bryant's personal notes, papers, and recorded recollections related to his work on the Fort Hood investigation and "Don't Ask, Don't Tell" repeals.

In 2010, Bryant co-founded the Bryant Zamberlan Group with Zamberlan, and has served as the managing partner.

In 2022, Bryant returned to government task force and commission work, joining The United States of America Vietnam War Commemoration as chief of staff, Task Force 23-Operation Welcome Home, the task force within the commission charged with planning and executing an $8M three-day 50th anniversary commemoration in May 2023 – including ceremonies, historical displays, and a multi-media concert on the National Mall – in recognition of the service and sacrifices of Vietnam War-era veterans and their families. In addition to his chief of staff duties, Bryant specifically oversaw the planning, programming, and production of the multimedia concert, featuring The United States Army Band and other military performers, football player Joe Theismann, former Miss America and ESPN reporter Sharlene Wells-Hawkes, singer Lee Greenwood, and actor Robert Patrick, among others, as well as remarks from President Joe Biden and Secretary of Defense Lloyd Austin and a subsequent broadcast adaptation of the concert. Following the conclusion of "Operation Welcome Home," Bryant agreed to stay on as a special assistant and senior advisor to MG Edward Chrystal, Jr., the commemoration's director, through October 2024.

=== Task forces and commissions ===
Year	Name	Leadership	Role	Notes
2009-2010	Department of Defense; Fort Hood Shooting Task Force	Togo D. West Jr., Vern Clark	Managing Editor, Writing and Admin Team Lead	
2010	US Air Force Fort Hood Task Force Follow-on	Michael B. Donley	Senior Writer, Writing Team Lead	
2010	"Don't Ask, Don't Tell" Comprehensive Review Working Group	Jeh Johnson, Carter Ham	Lead Editor, Editorial and Production Lead	
2011	Virginia Department of Health/VA Beach; Pandemic Influenza Program Assessment	Benjamin Bryant	Executive Director, Report Author	
2013-2016	Military Compensation and Retirement Modernization Commission	Al Maldon	Assoc. Director, Public Relations and Outreach (2015-2016); Lead Writer-Editor, Editorial and Production Lead (2013-2015)	
2022-2024	The United States of America Vietnam War Commemoration	Peter Aylward (2021-2022) Edward Chrystal (2022-)	Special Assistant/Senior Advisor, Director's Action Group, (2023-); Chief of Staff, Task Force 23/Operation Welcome Home (2022-2023); Senior Outreach Consultant (2022)	

== Digital Dunkirk and volunteer public service ==
In 2021, during the weeks leading up to the withdrawal of American troops and international presence from Afghanistan, Bryant facilitated the emergency evacuation of Afghan allies and their families and served as a planner and spokesperson for the "Digital Dunkirk" coalition of former and current military, diplomatic personnel, and government civilians working to coordinate evacuations.

In 2024, Bryant served as a volunteer planner and host/master of ceremonies for the Department of Defense's "Bring Your Child to Work Day" concert and program at the Pentagon, working with multiple military and civilian organizations (including the Walt Disney Corporation) on an all-day program of events and activities for more than 9,000 military families and guests.

Bryant has further served as an auxiliarist in the United States Coast Guard Auxiliary, including as a Flotilla Staff Officer, since 2012.

== Film, television and radio ==
Bryant began producing narrative television and film projects in 2016, first joining the digital series Anacostia at the start of its fifth season, as a supervising producer. Beginning with episode five, Bryant was named co-executive producer of the series, a role he continued until September 2019. He occasionally recurred on the series in the role of news anchor "James Vance," an homage to Washington D.C. news anchor Jim Vance.

In 2019, the Bryant Zamberlan Group partnered with Gemelli Films and writer-director Candice Cain to produce the first three entries in the "Candy Cain" series of holiday films, Ivy & Mistletoe, starring Cody Calafiore, Carrie Genzel, and Cynthia Gibb; The Maltese Holiday, starring Calafiore, Clayton Snyder, and Abigail Hawk; and Magic in Mount Holly, starring Calafiore, Genzel, Patrick Muldoon, Frank Whaley, Terri Garber, and Jennifer Bassey. Bryant was also an associate producer on Cain's Joy & Hope a western-themed romance co-starring Vivica A. Fox.

In 2020, Bryant began production on the sports comedy Aidy Kane, but suspended filming in March 2020 due to coronavirus pandemic. He later repackaged the existing footage with newly shot scenes into the four-time ISA-nominated sitcom, "Aidy Kane (Really Wants You to Love Him." That year, Bryant also debuted in the series regular role of troubled businessman "Gregory Marshall" on the dramatic serial Forever and a Day.

Bryant has appeared in four of writer-director Brooke B's "Script Out Loud" audio feature productions, Birthday Blues, Selling the Act, All I Want for Christmas is Drew, and Parently Ever After, as well as the Brooke B audio series "Dirty Laundry" and "What Goes Around." He portrayed "Nolan," the Nutcracker Prince, in JLJ Media's podcast special The Sugar Plum Fairy and the Nutcracker from Molina Productions, a role he reprised as a series regular on "The New Adventures of the Tooth Fairy" series from the same team. In 2023, Bryant joined the audio serial "Heritage" from Galen Roberts and "Forever and a Day" creator Casey S. Hutchison.

=== Station to Station ===
During the 2020 coronavirus lockdown, Bryant began writing the psychological drama, Station to Station, directing the film on location in September, keeping cast and crew in an isolated "bubble" to adhere to COVID-19 health and safety protocols. In 2021, the film began its festival run, marking Bryant's official debut as a feature film writer and director.

Markos Papadatos of Digital Journal called the film "compelling" and "bold," and K.P. Smith of We Are Entertainment News called it "deeply satisfying." Both reviewers compared Bryant's work to that of writer-directors Paul Thomas Anderson and Richard Linklater. Station to Station won "Best Narrative Feature," "Best Actor," and "Best Ensemble" in June 2021 at the IndieEye Film Awards and received multiple honors from IndieFEST and FILMHAUS Berlin in the following months. Bryant was specifically recognized by FILMHAUS with "first-time director" and "original concept" nominations.

In October 2021, the Las Vegas International Film and Screenwriting Festival announced Station to Station as both an Official Selection and the festival's opening night feature. The film premiered in competition, earning eight jury nominations, including as a finalist for the festival's Best Drama Feature, winning two, and was selected by attendees to receive the 2021 "Audience Award." On January 8, 2022, Station to Station was released via virtual cinema in the United States.

== Awards and honors ==
In December 1996, Bryant was named by the Austin American-Statesman as one of its year's "most memorable" following his notable broadcasting debut the night of the 1996 Olympic bombing.

In 2022, he received six nominations for the 12th Annual Indie Series Awards in 2022, including nominations for "Best Comedy Series" and "Best Supporting Actor - Comedy" nominations for Aidy Kane (Really Wants You to Love Him) and "Best Actor - Audio Fiction" for his second season performance as Gregory Marshall in Forever and a Day. At the ceremony on April 9, 2022, Bryant and his Forever and a Day castmates won the inaugural "Best Ensemble - Audio Fiction" award.

In May 2024, Bryant was nominated for a Capital Emmy by the National Academy of Television Arts and Sciences for his work on Welcome Home! Honoring Your Legacy, the broadcast/streaming version of the 2023 Welcome Home! Vietnam Veterans tribute event on the National Mall he produced. In December 2024, he received three Central Virginia Broadway World Award nominations for the 2023-2024 CCT season, two in the "Best Performer in a Play" category and one in the "Best Supporting Performer in Play" category.

Bryant has also received a 2010 Platinum MarCom "Special Category" Award for his work as the Managing Editor of the report of the Fort Hood Task Force, 2012 Davey Award for his appearances on "America Tonight," 2019 Communicator Award of Distinction for "The Brink with Benjamin Bryant" interview specials; multiple Platinum AVA and Hermes Creative Awards for "The Brink with Benjamin Bryant: INTERSECTIONS" podcast; and a 2020 Hermes Creative Award for the trailer for "Journeys Beyond."

In 2025, Bryant was invited to deliver the keynote commencement address at New York's Excelsior University.

=== Government and military medals and awards ===
- Office of the Secretary of Defense Medal for Exceptional Public Service
- Department of Homeland Security Outstanding Unit Award
- Coast Guard Unit Commendation (2 Gold Stars)

== Filmography ==
=== Film ===
Year	Title	Role	Notes
1996	Courage Under Fire	Army Soldier (uncredited)	
2019	Ivy & Mistletoe	Supervising Producer, "Air Traveler" (cameo)	
2019	The Maltese Holiday	Supervising Producer, "Airline Clerk" (cameo)	
2019	Magic in Mount Holly	Supervising Producer, "Waterbury Coach" (cameo)	
2020	Joy & Hope	Associate Producer	
2020	Aidy Kane	Writer, director, “Phineas Strong”	filming suspended due to the COVID-19 pandemic
2021	Station to Station	Writer, director, "Martin"	
2022	Grid Squares	Writer, director	

=== Television and streaming ===
Year	Title	Role	Notes
2016-2019	"Anacostia"	co-Executive Producer, “James Vance”	
2018-2019	"The Brink with Benjamin Bryant"	Executive Producer, Host	
2018	"Unraveling Knots: The Journey Begins"	Executive Producer, Host	
2018	"Welcome to the Show"	"The Narrator" (character)	
2019–present	"Journeys Beyond"	Executive Producer, co-Host	; production suspended due to the COVID-19 pandemic
2020	"Reality Sets In"	Producer	
2021	"Aidy Kane (Really Wants You to Love Him)"	Executive Producer, "Phineas Strong"	companion series for the feature film Aidy Kane
2023	"Welcome Home! Honoring Your Legacy" (broadcast, streaming special)	Producer, creative director, co-writer	nominated for 2024 Capital Emmy Award

=== Radio and podcasts ===
Year	Title	Type	Role	Type	Notes
1996-1997	"KJCE: The Week in Austin"	Weekly Current Events Program	Self	Host, Interviewer	
2016-2018	"The BZCast"	Interview Program	Self	Host, Interviewer	
2018-2019	"The Brink with Benjamin Bryant: INTERSECTIONS"	Narrative Podcast, Investigative Serial	Self	Host, Narrator	
2020–present	Forever and a Day	Audio Drama (series)	"Gregory Marshall"	Series Regular	
2020	Birthday Blues	Audio Drama (feature)	"James"	Supporting	
2021	Selling the Act	Audio Comedy (feature)	"Aaron"	Supporting	
2021	"The Sugar Plum Fairy and the Nutcracker" (The Really Short Story Podcast)	Audio Drama (special)	"Prince Nolan Nutcracker"	Lead	
2021	"The Grown Up Adventures of the Tooth Fairy"	Audio Drama (series)	"Prince Nolan Nutcracker"	Supporting	
2021	"Dirty Laundry"	Audio Drama (series)	"Blake"	Recurring	
2022	All I Want for Christmas is Drew	Audio Dramedy (feature)	"Santa"	Supporting	
2022	"What Goes Around"	Audio Drama (series)	"Dr. Monroe"	Special Guest Star	
2023	Parently Ever After	Audio Dramedy (feature)	"Omar"	Lead	
2023	"Heritage"	Audio Drama (series)	"Derek"	Series Regular	
2024	"The D Word" (Divorce)	Audio Drama (series)	"Frank Porter"	Guest Star	
2026	"Haven Falls"	Audio Drama (series)	"Malcom Callahan"	Series Regular	
