= Lucy Jarvis (producer) =

American television producer (1917–2020)

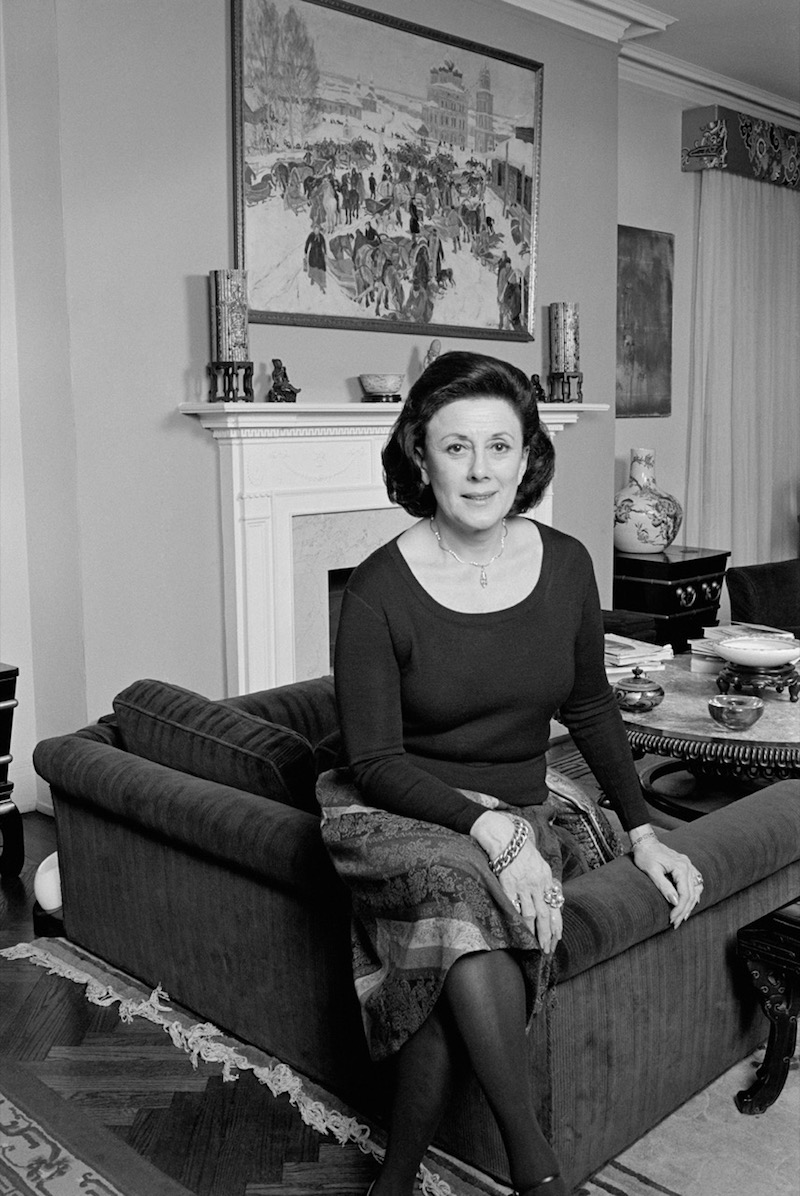
- Lucy Jarvis photographed in her home in 1980 by Lynn Gilbert
- Born: Lucile Howard; June 24, 1917; Manhattan, New York City, U.S.
- Died: January 26, 2020 (aged 102); Manhattan, New York City, U.S.
- Occupation: Television producer
- Years active: 1947–2017
- Spouse: Serge Jarvis (m. 1940; died 1999)
- Children: 2

Lucile Jarvis (née Howard; June 24, 1917 – January 26, 2020) was an American television producer.

== Career ==
Lucy Jarvis was born in New York City to Herman Howard and Sophie Kirsch on June 24, 1917. Jarvis studied home economics and nutrition at Cornell University and was also president of the drama club. She was hired as a dietitian at the New York Hospital-Cornell Medical Center but subsequently became food editor for McCall's magazine, leaving that position to raise two children. While volunteering for the Organization for Rehabilitation through Training, she produced a documentary, Passport to Freedom. She worked for several radio and television organizations and was women's television editor for Pathé News. In 1957, she worked with Martha Rountree on a public affairs radio show based in Washington, D.C. In 1959, Jarvis joined NBC as an associate producer for The Nation’s Future, a program where various topics were debated; in 1961, she became producer. Her 1963 documentary The Kremlin received an Emmy Award for cinematography. The 1964 documentary The Louvre: A Golden Prison received a Peabody Award, a Radio-TV Critics Award and six Emmys; in 1968, Jarvis was named a Chevalier in the French Ordre des Arts et des Lettres. In 1973, she received a Hillman Prize for the documentary What Price Health.

In 1976, Jarvis left NBC to produce several Barbara Walters specials for ABC. She subsequently formed her own production company which produced a number of films, including the television movie Family Reunion. She was producer for a 1988 Russian-American co-production of the Broadway musical Sophisticated Ladies. In 1990, Jarvis brought the Russian rock opera Juno and Avos to New York City.

== Personal life ==
Lucy Howard married Serge Jarvis, a lawyer, in 1940.

In 1972, Jarvis signed her name to the Ms. campaign “We Have Had Abortions.” The campaign called for an end to "archaic laws" limiting reproductive freedom, and encouraging women to share their stories and take action.

On June 23, 2012, Jarvis celebrated her 95th birthday at the Boathouse in New York City, with a festive hat garden party. She turned 100 in June 2017 and died on January 26, 2020, at the age of 102.
