= Albert Bryant Jr. =

United States Army general

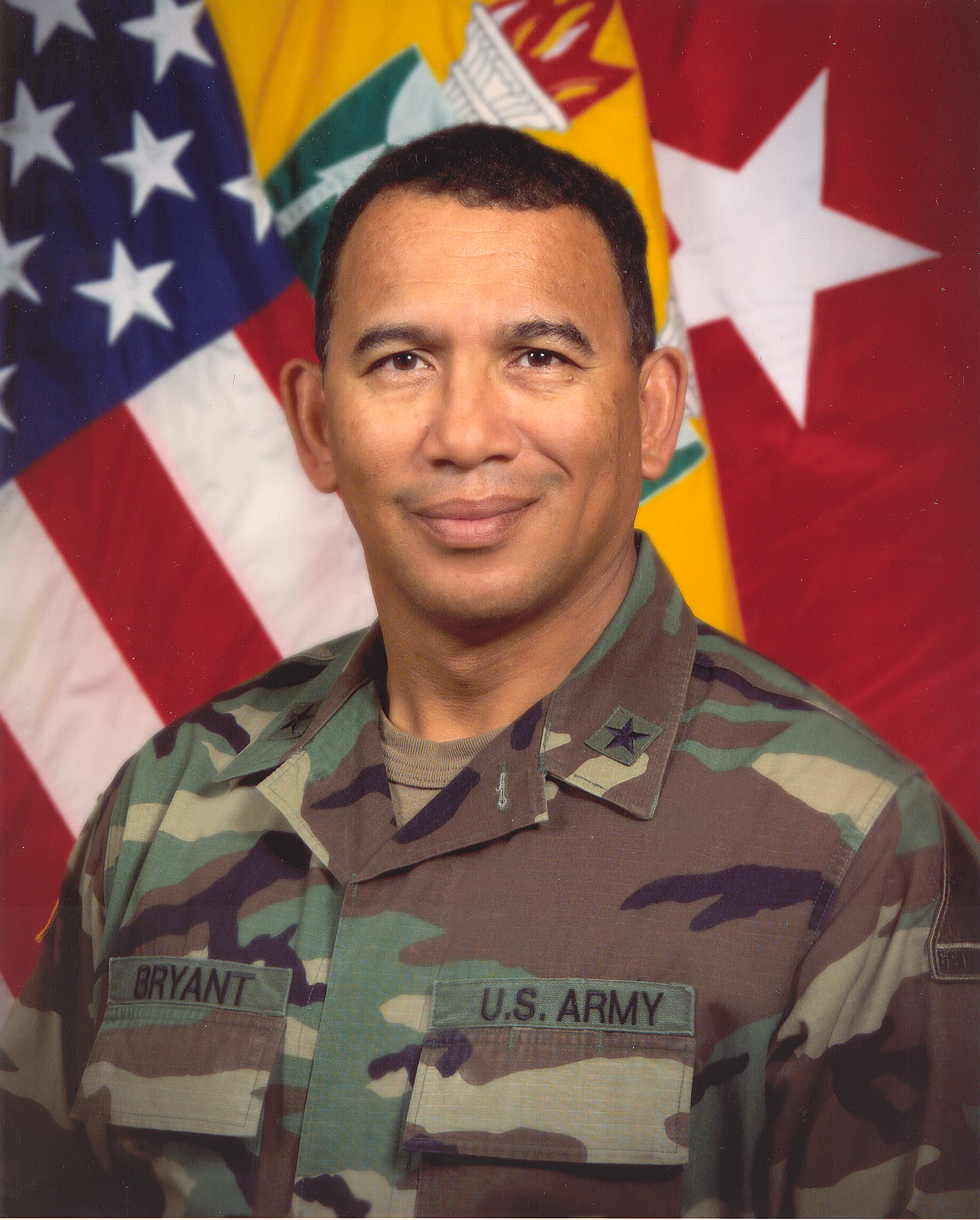
- Bryant's official U.S. Department of the Army photo
- Born: February 22, 1952 (age 74); Pine Bluff, Arkansas, U.S.
- Spouse: Renée Bryant (m. 1975)
- Military career
- Allegiance: United States of America
- Branch: United States Army
- Service years: 1974–2008
- Rank: Brigadier general
- Nickname: "Al"
- Commands: Commander, A Company, 2nd Battalion, 67th Armor, 2nd Armored Division; Commander, 4th Battalion, 67th Armor "Bandits," 1st Armored Division; Commander, 3rd Brigade Combat Team, 1st Armored Division; Director, Center for Army Tactics, Army Command and General Staff College
- Conflicts: Iraq War; Operation Iraqi Freedom; Operation Joint Endeavor
- Awards: Defense Superior Service Medal; Legion of Merit (2 Oak Leaf Clusters); Defense Meritorious Service Medal; Meritorious Service Medal (7 Oak Leaf Clusters); Defense Distinguished Service Medal; Global War on Terrorism Service Medal; Global War on Terrorism Expeditionary Medal; National Defense Service Medal (2 Stars); NATO Non-Article 5 Medal; German Ehrenkreuz der Bundeswehr (Gold); Italian Commemorative Cross for Peace Operations; Bronze Star; Combat Action Badge; Parachutist Badge

Albert Bryant Jr. (born February 22, 1952) is a retired United States Army brigadier general, best known for service as the Chief of Western Hemisphere Operations during and in the aftermath of the September 11 attacks and for his tenure as the Assistant Division Commander of the 4th Infantry Division at the time of the division's detection and capture of deposed Iraqi president Saddam Hussein. Bryant also served as the Deputy Commander of Fort Knox, Kentucky, and the United States Army's Armor School. As Chief of Staff of NATO's Kosovo Force (KFOR), Bryant was the highest ranking American general on the KFOR leadership team in the lead up to Kosovo independence.

== Early life and education ==
Bryant was born on February 22, 1952, in Pine Bluff, Arkansas, and is of African, Chinese, and Irish-Scottish Celtic ancestry. His parents are retired U.S. Army Reserve Brigadier General and Congressional Gold Medal recipient, Albert Bryant Sr., an original Montford Point Marine, and Mable Bryant (née Lun), a nurse. The eldest of five siblings, including writer and novelist Lori Bryant-Woolridge, Bryant was reared in the San Francisco Bay Area. He attended Newark High School in Newark, California. Bryant graduated in 1970 with an appointment to the United States Military Academy at West Point.

Bryant earned an undergraduate degree in General Engineering from West Point, and holds a master's degree in Operations Analysis from Stanford University in Palo Alto, California. He holds an additional graduate degree from the U.S. Army Command and General Staff College School of Advanced Military Studies (SAMS).

== Career ==
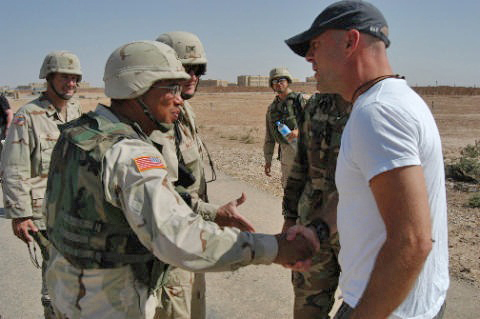
Bryant meeting actor Bruce Willis in Tikrit, Iraq, in September 2003

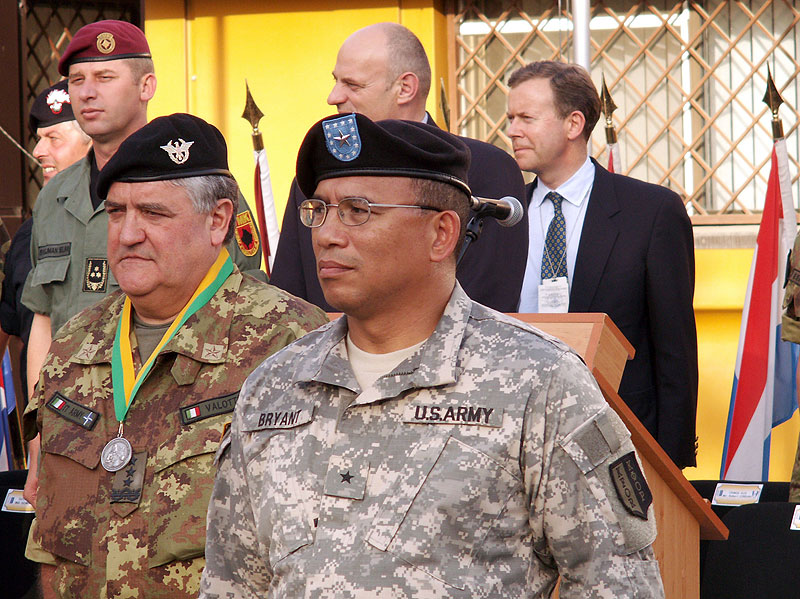
Bryant during his installation ceremony as Kosovo Force chief of staff in Pristina, Kosovo in June 2006

Bryant was commissioned as a Second Lieutenant, Armor Branch, from the U.S. Military Academy in 1974. After graduation, he attended the Armor Officer Basic Course and then assigned to 3d Squadron, 2d Armored Cavalry Regiment, Amberg, Germany as platoon leader and troop executive officer. Following the Armor Officer's Advanced Course, he was assigned to the 2nd Battalion, 67th Armor, 2nd Armored Division, Fort Hood, Texas, as S3 (Air) and then as Commander, Company A.

Bryant attended graduate school at Stanford University, Palo Alto, California, receiving his Masters of Science Degree in Operations Research and Systems Analysis in 1983.

In 1986, Bryant attended the United States Army's Command and General Staff College and the Army's School of Advanced Military Studies receiving a Masters of Military Arts and Sciences. Subsequently, he was assigned as Chief, Plans and Exercises G3, 5th Infantry Division, Fort Polk, Louisiana, and then as Executive Officer, 1st Battalion 70th Armor, and then as S3 for the 1st Raider Brigade.

In 1991, Bryant joined the Army Staff and the Directorate of Program Analysis and Evaluation as a Combat Systems Analyst. In 1993, he assumed command of the 4th Battalion, 67th Armor "Bandits", 1st Armored Division, Friedberg, Hesse Germany. Upon completion of command he was reassigned as Chief of Plans, G3, V Corps and served as Chief Planner for Operation Joint Endeavor, IFOR operations in Bosnia. Interviews with Bryant and a description of his planning efforts in support of Operation Joint Endeavor are featured in the 2005 book Armed Peacekeepers in Bosnia.

In 1996, Bryant returned from deployment to the United States Army War College's Operational Warfighting Fellowship at Fort Leavenworth in Kansas. In April 1998 he assumed command of 3rd Brigade Combat Team, 1st Armored Division, Fort Riley, Kansas. Departing the "Bulldog Brigade" in 2000 he assumed duties as Chief, Western Hemisphere Operations, J3, the Joint Staff in Washington, D.C., serving as Chief of Western Hemisphere Operations during and in the aftermath of the September 11 attacks.

Bryant was then assigned to the United States Army Command and General Staff College as the Director, Center for Army Tactics and selected for promotion to brigadier general in March 2003. In June 2003, Bryant was assigned as Assistant Division Commander (Support), 4th Infantry Division (Mechanized) and Task Force Ironhorse conducting combat operations as part of Operation Iraqi Freedom. It was during this time that the 4th ID played the primary role in the location and capture of fugitive deposed Iraqi dictator Saddam Hussein.

In April 2004, the Division redeployed to Fort Hood, Texas, to refit in preparation for future operations, and Bryant reported to duty at Fort Knox, Kentucky, to serve as the Deputy Commanding General, U.S. Army Armor Center and Fort Knox, and head the Unit of Action Maneuver Battle Lab, or UAMBL.

The following year, Bryant was selected to represent the United States as Chief of Staff of NATO's internationally staffed Kosovo Force, KFOR, and relocated to Kosovo. He assumed his position at a NATO installation ceremony on June 27, 2005, becoming the senior American official on the KFOR HQ command leadership team.

Bryant's final military assignment was as the Director of Integration, Headquarters, Department of the Army, G8, at the Pentagon, where he supervised the planning and direction of equipment systems worldwide for the U.S. Army, synchronizing equipment deliveries with manning and training requirements, and served as chairman of the Army Reset Task Force.

=== Campaigns ===
- Operation Joint Endeavor, assigned as Chief of Plans, G3, V Corps, serving as Chief Planner, IFOR operations in Bosnia; 1995–1996
- Operation Iraqi Freedom, assigned as Assistant Division Commander (Support), 4th Infantry Division (Mechanized), and Task Force Ironhorse, based in Tikrit, Iraq; 2003–2004
- NATO Operation, Kosovo Force, KFOR Chief of Staff, Kosovo; 2006–2007

== Later work ==
Since retiring from active duty service, Bryant has served as an international civilian consultant on military, diversity, and executive management matters, primarily based alternately in the United Arab Emirates and the Washington, D.C., metropolitan area.

== Personal life ==
Bryant has been married since 1975 to the former Renée Saxton, daughter of retired Army and Illinois National Guard Brigadier General Richard Saxton. They have four children. Their eldest son is broadcaster and writer Benjamin Bryant, who is best known in military circles as the lead editor of the 2010 DoD reports recommending the repeal of the 1993 Don't Ask, Don't Tell law.

== Awards and decorations ==
=== Medals and ribbons ===
- Distinguished Service Medal
- Defense Superior Service Medal
- Legion of Merit (2 Oak Leaf Clusters)
- Bronze Star
- Defense Meritorious Service Medal
- Meritorious Service Medal (7 Oak Leaf Clusters)
- Army Commendation Medal (2 Oak Leaf Clusters)
- Army Achievement Medal (Oak Leaf Cluster)
- Global War on Terrorism Service Medal
- Global War on Terrorism Expeditionary Medal
- National Defense Service Medal (2 Stars)
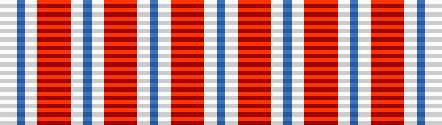
- Meritorious Public Service Medal
- NATO Non-Article 5 Medal
- Combat Action Badge
- Parachutist Badge

Honors and decorations bestowed on Bryant by foreign governments include:

- German Cross of Honour of the Bundeswehr in Gold
- Italian Commemorative Cross for Peace Operations

Bryant is also a 1998 recipient of the Draper Armor Leadership Award for Excellence in Leadership from the Draper Combat Leadership Trust Fund Council, and has named to the U.S. Cavalry and Armor Association's Order of St. George, in addition to various community and professional recognitions and honors.

== Gallery ==
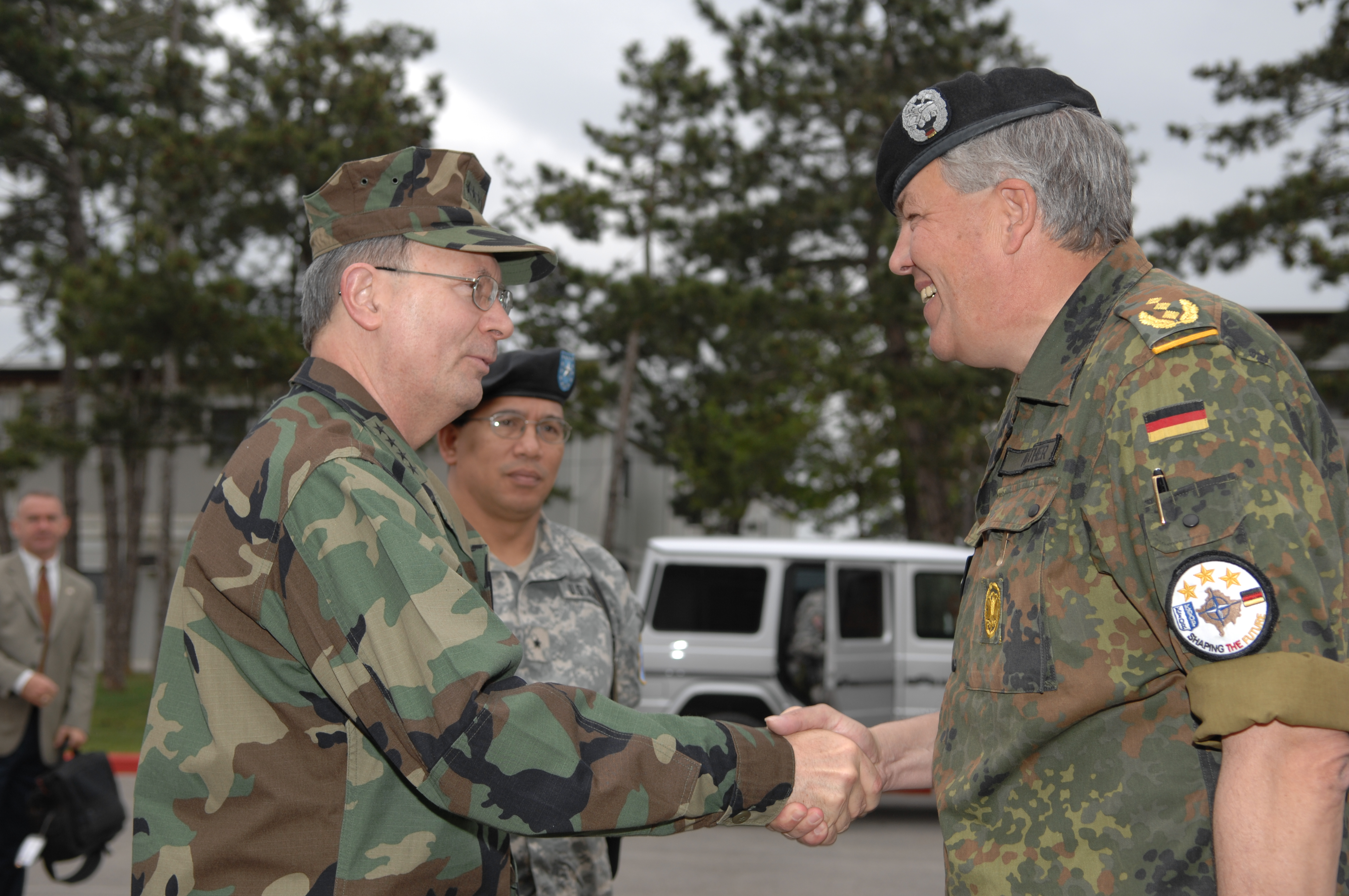
Bryant observes as Admiral Edmund Giambastiani greets German Lieutenant General Roland Kather in May 2007.

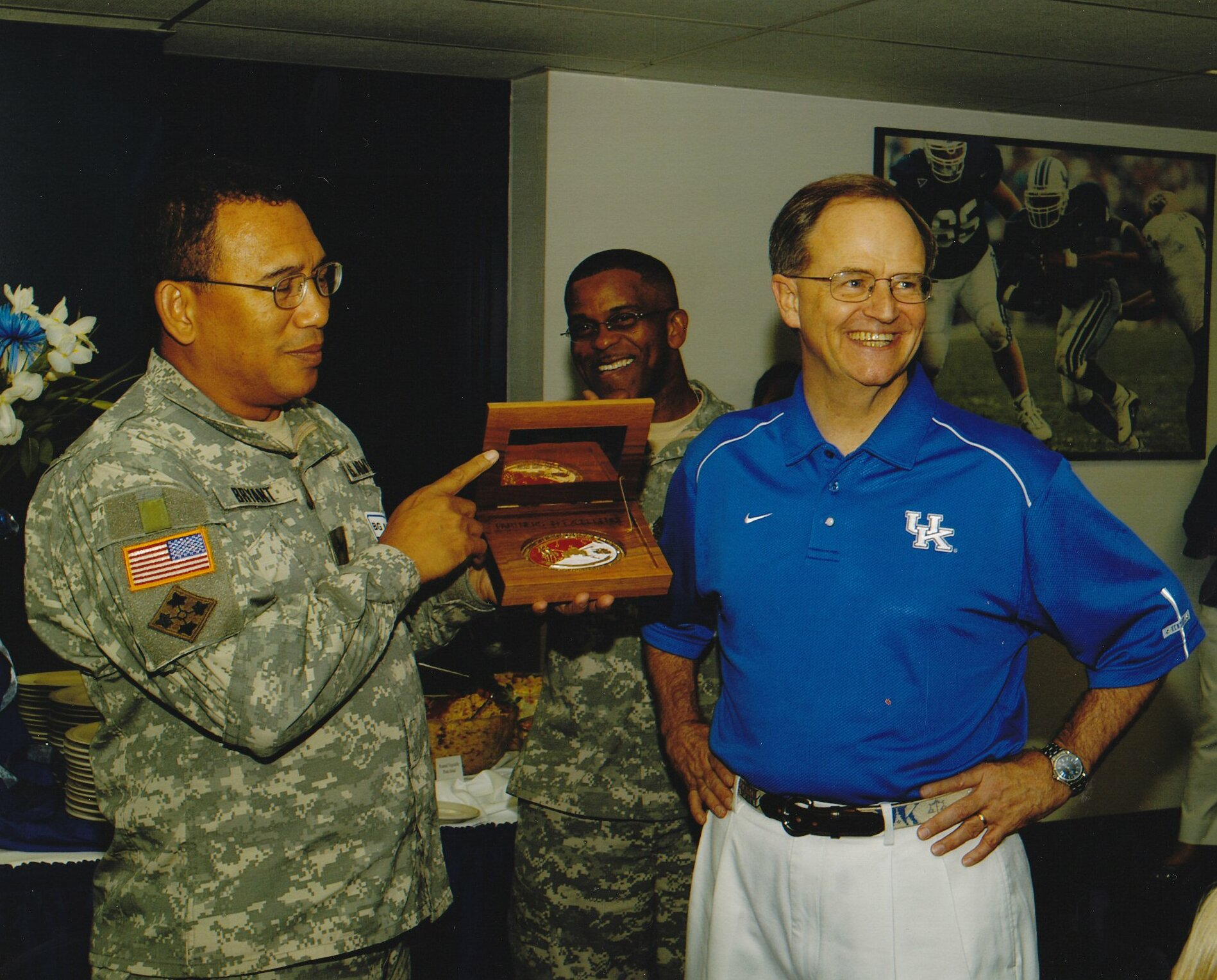
Bryant in September 2005, presenting University of Kentucky President Lee Todd Jr. with an award.

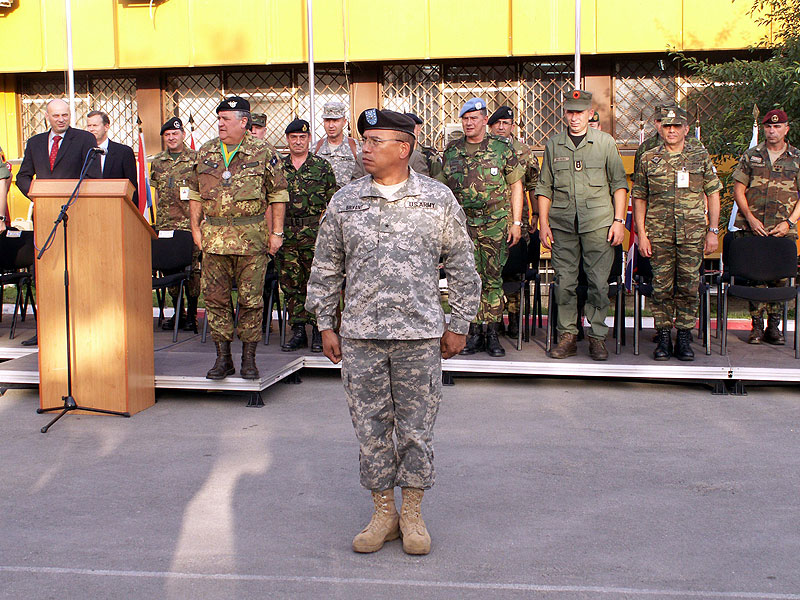
Bryant reviews international troops at his NATO KFOR Installation.

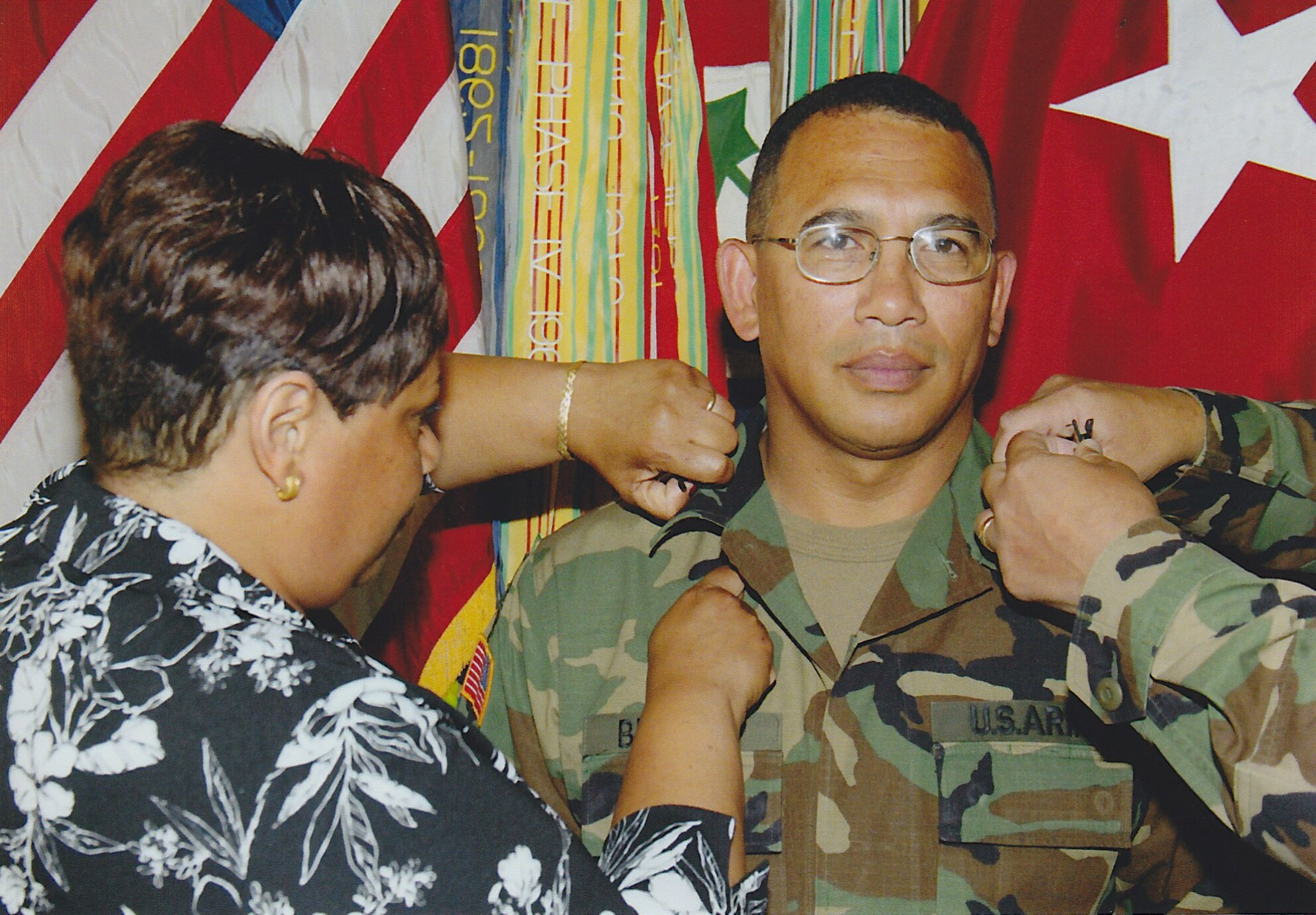
Bryant is pinned in a promotion ceremony by his wife, military families advocate Renee Bryant.

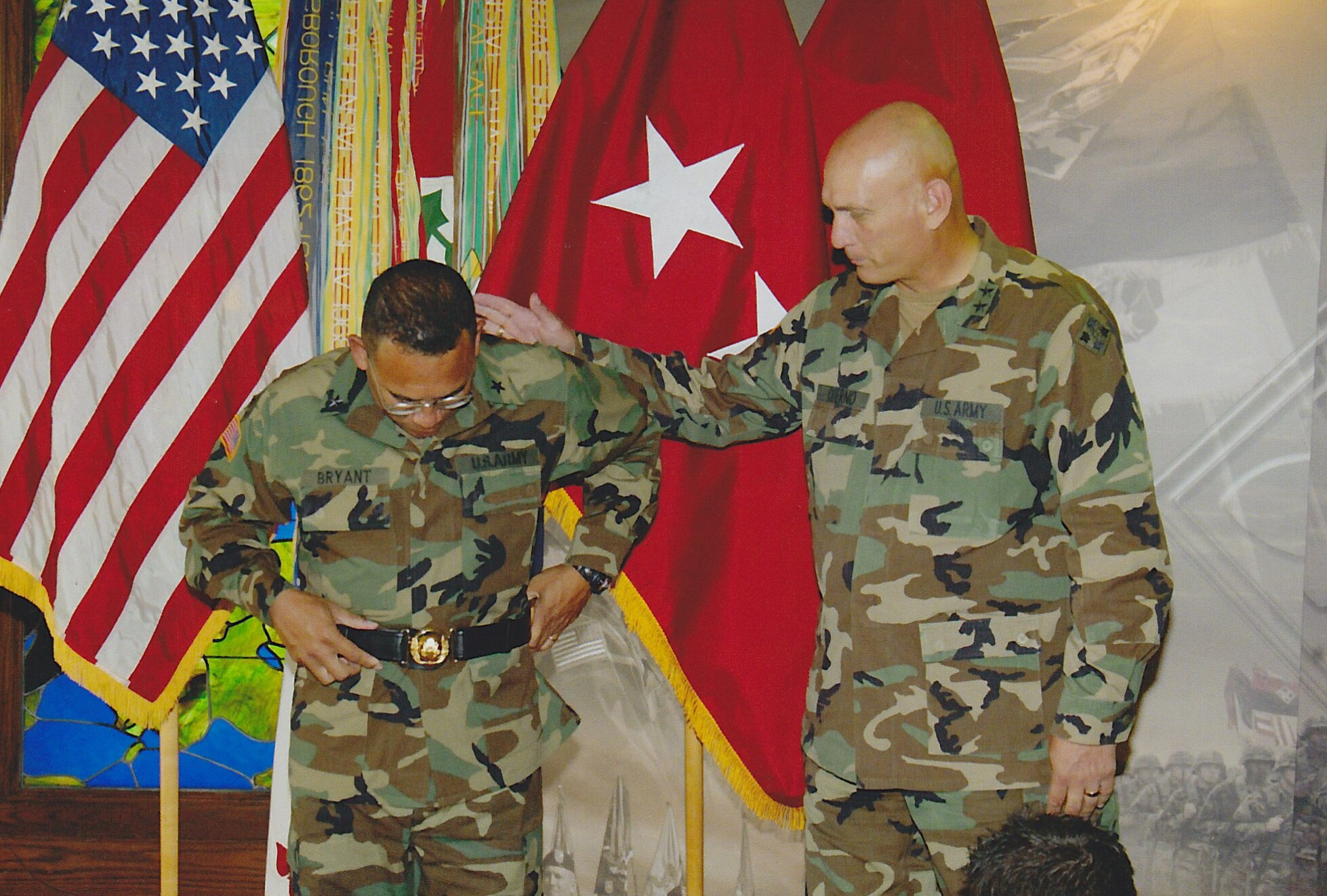
MG Raymond Odierno and Bryant at 4th Infantry Division Ceremony

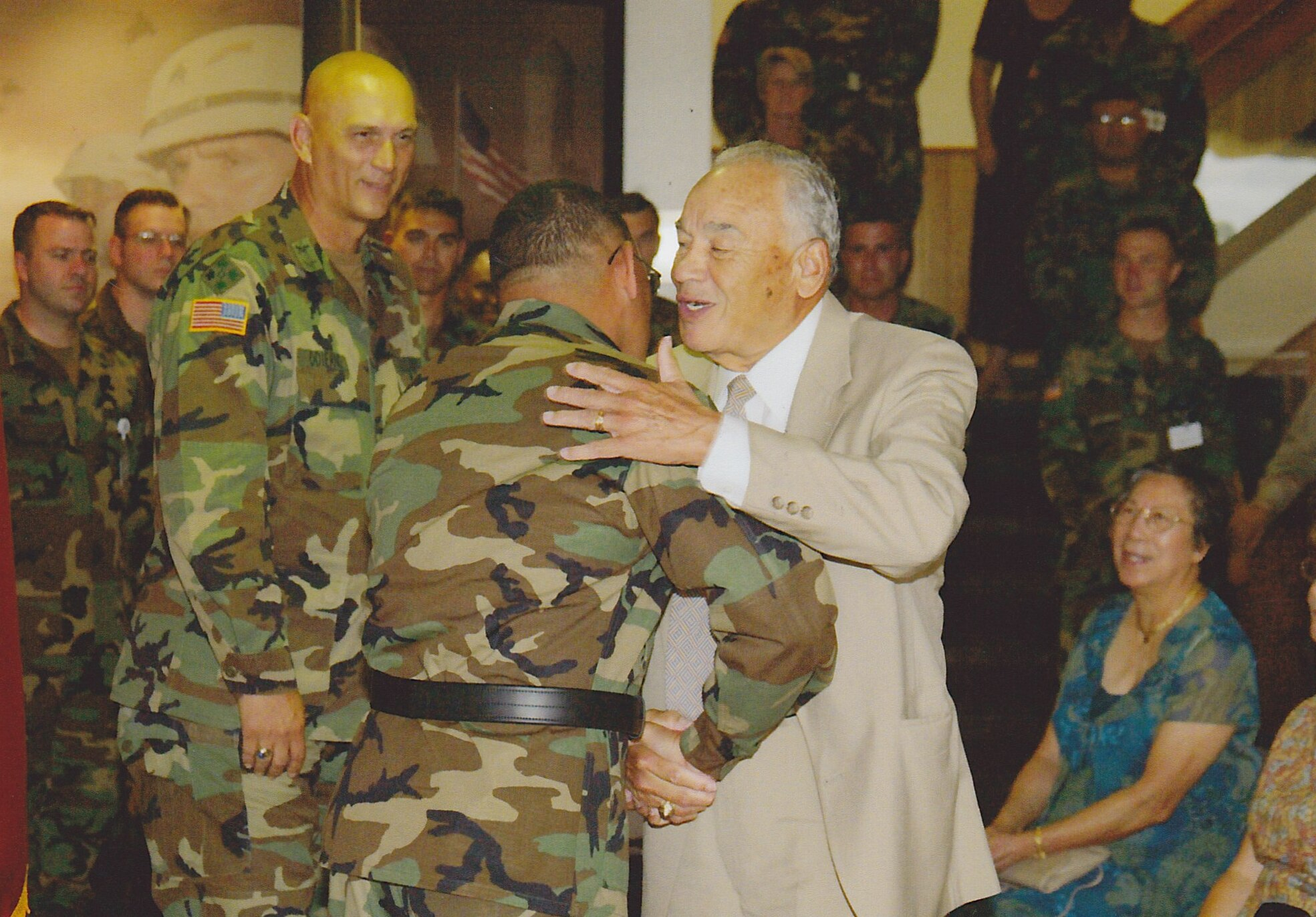
Bryant is greeted warmly by his father, original Montfort Point Marine and Congressional Gold Medal Recipient, Albert Bryant Sr.

== Bibliography ==
Bryant has authored three monographs on military-related matters, including:

- Bryant, Albert Jr. (1987). Blind man's bluff? A look at the tactical reconnaissance capabilities of the U.S. Army's Light Infantry Division. Combined Arms Research Library.
- Bryant, Albert Jr. (1988). Agility. A Key to the Operational Art. Combined Arms Research Library.
- Bryant, Albert Jr. (1997). Meeting the U.S. Army's Service Component Command (ASCC) Requirements for Peace Enforcement Operations. Combined Arms Research Library.
