= Las Vegas International Film and Screenwriting Festival =

Annual film and screenplay festival

Las Vegas International Film and Screenplay Festival
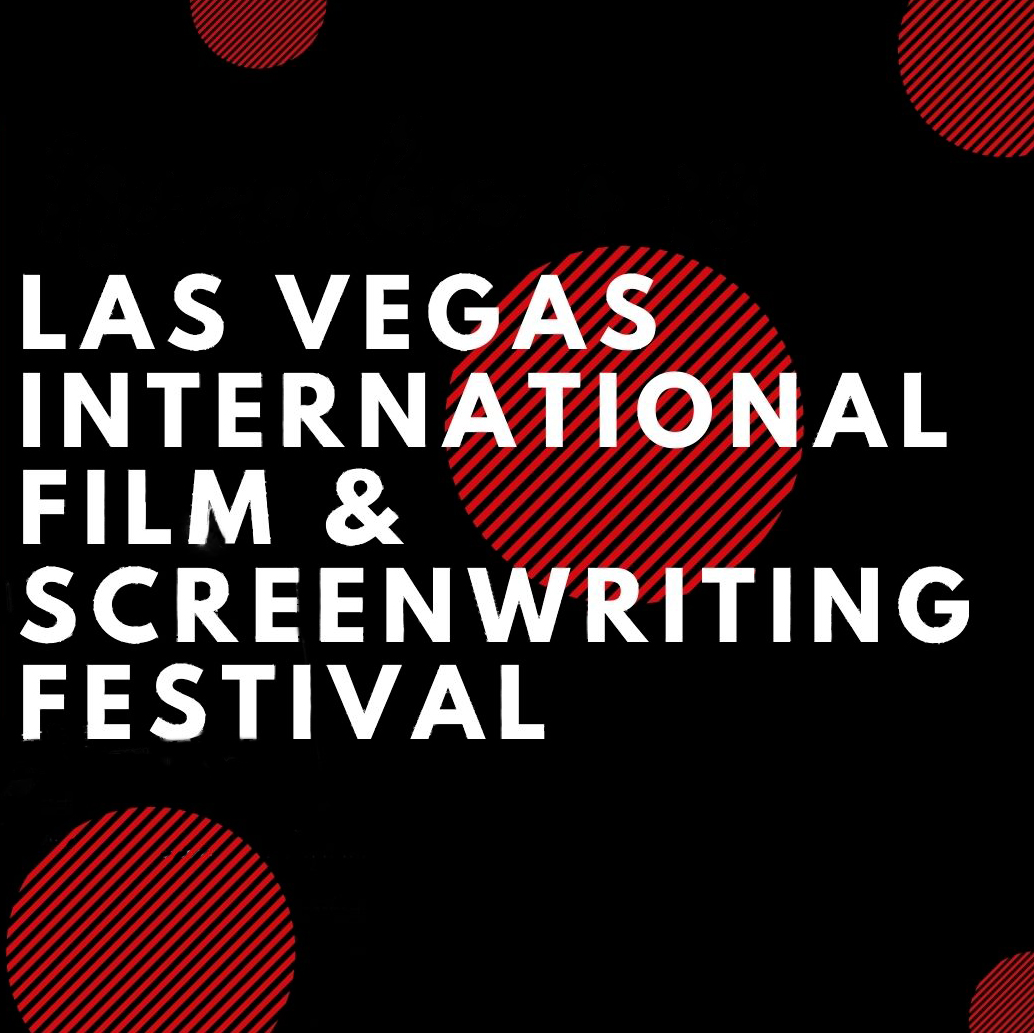
- Location: Las Vegas, Nevada
- Predecessor: Las Vegas International Film and Screenplay Competition
- Founded: 2015
- Founded by: Annette C. Hull; Warren R. Hull
- Language: International
- Website: www.lvifsf.com

The Las Vegas International Film and Screenwriting Festival (LVIFSF) is a virtual film festival held annually in Las Vegas, Nevada. Founded in 2015 (as the Las Vegas International Screenwriting Contest), the festival was previously based at the Palms Casino Resort, with screenings of selected films held in nearby theaters and screening rooms. The festival also grants awards by genre, technical discipline, and lifetime achievement over two nights during the program.

In 2020, the festival program was moved to a virtual format due to the COVID-19 pandemic. On August 21, 2021, the festival announced it would continue to host the program, including screenings, virtually.

The Las Vegas International Film and Screenwriting Festival is directed by Annette Hull, documentary filmmaker and former General Manager of the Tri-Cities Rattlers football organization in the Northwest Football League. Notable past honorees include Academy Award-nominee Eric Roberts and Emmy Award-winner Michael Learned, and 2019 indie breakout Princess of the Row, starring Martin Sheen.

== Sections ==
The Las Vegas International Film and Screenplay Festival official program is divided into two sections: film and written word. Entries are submitted and judged separately, by section, with Official Selections named for each. Honors and awards are bestowed in separate ceremonies on different nights during the festival.

== Awards ==
Jury awards are presented in a number of genre, performance, and technical categories, over two nights, with one ceremony per section.

=== Film ===
Film and Genre Categories	Individual Categories
Music Video; Musical Score; Documentary - Short; Documentary - Feature; Teleplay or Web-Base Series; Narrative Short; Student; International; Action; Adapted; Animation; Biographical; Comedy; Crime; Drama; Faith-Based	Best Film; Best Director; Best Cinematography; Best Film Editing; Best Musical Score; Best Actress in a Leading Role; Best Actor in a Leading Role; Best Actress in a Supporting Role; Best Actor in a Supporting Role; Best Makeup and Hairstyling; Best Costume Design

=== Written Word ===
Feature Screenplay Categories	Script Categories
Adapted (any source material); Action/Adventure; Animation; Biographical; Comedy; Crime; Drama; Faith-Based; Family; Fantasy; LGBTQ; Historical/Period; Horror; Military; MOB Themed; Mystery; Musical; Romance; Science Fiction; Sports; Thriller; Western	Original TV Drama Pilot (1 hour); Original TV Sitcom Pilot (1/2 hour); Existing TV Drama Spec (1 hour); Existing TV Sitcom Spec (1/2 hour); Short (All genres)

=== Special awards ===
==== Lifetime Achievement ====
In 2019, the Festival announced the creation of a lifetime achievement award to be awarded to an artist of renown, with substantial contributions to the industry. In 2019, the program honored actress and four-time Emmy Award-winner Michael Learned with the inaugural award. The award was not given in 2020, due to the cancellation of all in-person events and ceremonies.

==== Writer of the Year ====
In 2019, the Festival presented a "Writer of the Year" honor to Harold Brown.

==== Audience Award ====
All films presented during the festival are eligible for Audience Awards. After screening an eligible film, audience members are invited to vote in audience award categories. At the November 2021 edition of the festival, Benjamin Bryant's psychological drama Station to Station received the Audience Award.
