= Family Reunion (1981 film) =

- Video tape cover
- Genre: Drama
- Based on: How America Lives by Joe Sparton
- Written by: Allan Sloane
- Directed by: Fielder Cook
- Starring: Bette Davis; J. Ashley Hyman; David Huddleston; John Shea
- Theme music composer: Wladimir Selinsky
- Country of origin: United States
- Original language: English

Production
- Producer: Lucy Jarvis
- Production locations: Locust Valley Elementary School, Muttontown, New York, USA; New York City; Washington, D.C.
- Cinematography: Jack Priestley
- Editor: Eric Albertson
- Running time: 200 minutes
- Production companies: Columbia Pictures Television; Creative Projects

Original release
- Network: NBC
- Release: October 11 – October 12, 1981

Family Reunion is a 1981 American made-for-television drama film directed by Fielder Cook. The teleplay by Allan Sloane was based on the Ladies' Home Journal article "How America Lives" by Joe Sparton. It was produced by Columbia Pictures Television for NBC, which aired it in two parts on October 11 and 12, 1981.

== Plot ==
Family Reunion follows Elizabeth Winfield, a New England teacher recently retired after a 50-year career. She uses an unlimited bus ticket received as a gift to visit the distant members of her long-estranged family. During her absence, her small hometown, which bears her family's name, falls prey to dishonest relatives colluding with corrupt shopping mall developers. She returns in an effort to halt construction on the project and, armed with the moral integrity she has instilled in her students for the past five decades, she manages to resolve the situation in time for the annual Founder's Day festivities.

== Cast ==
- Bette Davis as Elizabeth Winfield
- J. Ashley Hyman as Richard Cooper
- David Huddleston as Chester Winfield
- John Shea as James Cookman
- Roy Dotrice as Luther Frye
- Roberts Blossom as Phil King
- Kathryn Walker as Louisa King
- David Rounds as Grover Winfield
- Roberta Wallach as Jessica Winfield
- Jeff McCracken as Max Winfield
- Beth Ehlers as Janice Lyman
- Paul Rudd as Lane Lyman
