= McCall's =

Defunct monthly American women's magazine

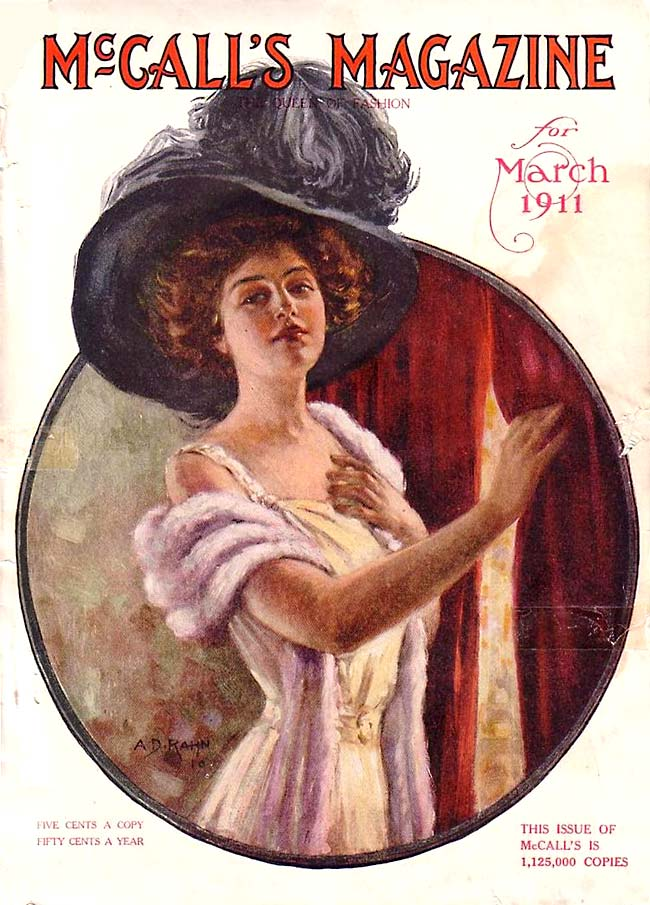
- Cover of McCall's magazine (1911)
- Categories: Women's magazine
- Frequency: Monthly
- Founder: James McCall
- First issue: 1873
- Final issue: 2002
- Company: McCall Corporation
- Country: United States
- ISSN: 1060-1201

McCall's was a monthly American women's magazine, published by the McCall Corporation, that enjoyed great popularity through much of the 20th century, peaking at a readership of 8.4 million in the early 1960s. The publication was established as a small-format magazine called The Queen in 1873. In 1897 it was renamed McCall's Magazine—The Queen of Fashion (later shortened to McCall's) and subsequently grew in size to become a large-format glossy. It was one of the "Seven Sisters" group of women's service magazines.

McCall's published fiction by such well-known authors as Alice Adams, Lester Atwell, Ray Bradbury, Gelett Burgess, Willa Cather, Jack Finney, F. Scott Fitzgerald, Barbara Garson, John Steinbeck, Tim O'Brien, Tony J. Caridi, Anne Tyler and Kurt Vonnegut.

== Features ==
From June 1949 until her death in November 1962, Eleanor Roosevelt wrote a McCall's column, "If You Ask Me". The former First Lady gave brief answers to questions sent into the magazine.

Starting in May 1951, and lasting until at least 1995, Betsy McCall paper dolls were printed in most issues. Children could cut out the printed dolls and clothing, or for a small fee (10¢ in 1957, 25¢ in 1967) paper dolls printed on cardboard could be ordered. Betsy McCall became so popular that various sized vinyl dolls were produced by Ideal and American Character Dolls.

Another popular feature which ran for many years was the cartoon panel It's All in the Family by Stan and Jan Berenstain.

A pair of pioneering female illustrators, Jessie Willcox Smith and Neysa McMein, drew dozens of McCall's cover portraits.

Film critic Pauline Kael worked at McCall's from 1965 to 1966, and was reportedly fired after writing a highly unfavorable review of The Sound of Music.

== Publication history ==
=== Sewing patterns and The Queen of Fashion ===
In 1870, Scottish immigrant James McCall began designing and printing his own line of sewing patterns. As a means of advertising his patterns, McCall founded a four-page fashion journal entitled The Queen: Illustrating McCall's Bazaar Glove-Fitting Patterns.

When McCall died in 1884, his widow became president of McCall Company, and hired Mrs. George Bladsworth as magazine editor. Mrs. Bladsworth held the position until 1891. Though still mainly a vehicle to sell McCall's sewing patterns, The Queen began to publish homemaking and handiwork information, and by 1890 had expanded to 12 pages.

In 1891, the magazine's name became The Queen of Fashion, and the cost for a year's subscription was 30 cents. In 1893, James Henry Ottley took over the McCall Company. He increased the subscription price to 50 cents a year, increased the number of pages to between 16 and 30 per issue, and began to publish articles on children's issues, health, beauty, and foreign travel. In order to reflect the magazine's expanded range of topics, the name was changed to McCall's Magazine—The Queen of Fashion in 1897. In time, the name would be shortened to McCall's.

Despite the name changes, for many years information on McCall's patterns filled an average of 20 percent of the magazine's pages.

=== McCall's Magazine ===
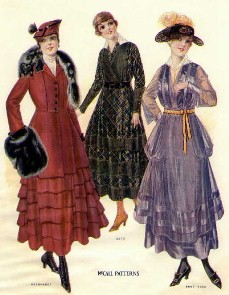
Fashion 1916 in McCall's

In 1913, the magazine was purchased by the banking firm of White Weld & Co., which organized the McCall Corporation under the direction of president Edward Alfred Simmons. In 1917, the price was raised to 10 cents per issue.

In August 1918 Bessie Beatty was appointed editor. She had recently returned to America after spending seven months covering the Russian revolution. She had previously worked for editor Fremont Older in San Francisco for seven years.

In 1922, Harry Payne Burton became editor, and for the first time such well-known fiction writers as Kathleen Norris, Harold Bell Wright, Zane Grey and Booth Tarkington had stories published in McCall's.

In 1928, the 23-year-old associate editor, Otis Wiese, was promoted to editor. He believed "women were ready for more significant fiction than Gene Stratton-Porter" and suggested that McCall's sell Burton's acquisitions of popular fiction to Ladies Home Journal and Woman's Home Companion. Such radical ideas caused Wiese to be fired at least six times within his first year as editor, but he was always rehired because, as he put it, "there was no one else around the place with ideas."

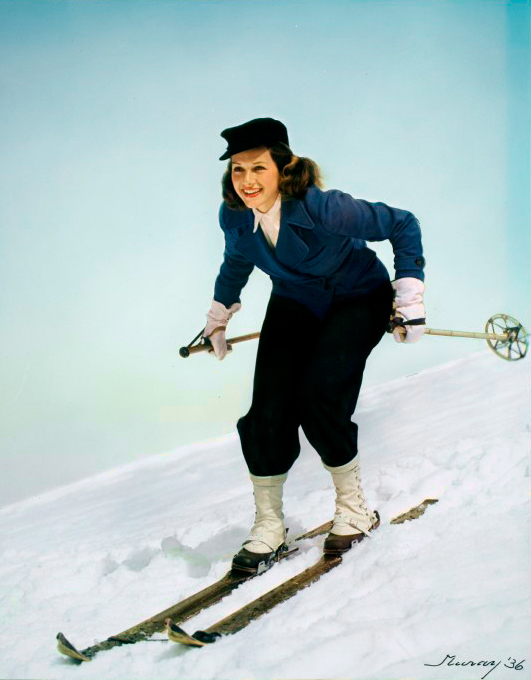
McCall's Homemaking cover (1938): Jinx Falkenburg

In 1932, Wiese changed the format to what he called Three Magazines in One. Three sections—News and Fiction, Homemaking, Style and Beauty—had their own cover, and each contained ads tailored to its contents. A survey was conducted that showed fiction was a major attraction for female magazine readers, and in 1937 McCall's became the first women's magazine to print a complete novel in one issue.

Pearl Harbor was attacked on December 7, 1941, and Otis Wiese immediately revamped the February 1942 issue then in preparation. A frilly valentine cover was replaced with a woman wearing an "I've Enlisted" consumer pledge button. Readers were asked to sign a pledge that stated "As a consumer, in the total defense of democracy, I will do my part to make my country ready, efficient and strong. I will buy carefully. I will take good care of the things I have. I will waste nothing." Within three weeks, 150,000 readers signed the pledge and sent in a coupon printed in the magazine. During World War II, all women's magazines took on a patriotic slant, but McCall's received much positive press coverage for being the first magazine to do so. McCall's began a "Washington Newsletter" section, which provided information on rationing and conservation.

During the post-war era, fiction was no longer such an important draw for readers; they wanted more articles and picture spreads. To provide lively nonfiction Wiese hired two former Look magazine editors. Daniel Danforth Mich became editorial director, and Henry Ehrlich was named managing editor.

McCall's Three Magazines in One format was discontinued in 1950. In 1954 Wiese began to reformat McCall's with a "Togetherness" slogan; it was announced that the magazine would no longer be just for women, but aimed at the entire family. During this time period paid circulation was 4.5 million per issue.

In 1953, financier Norton Simon began purchasing shares of McCall Corporation, and in 1956, Simon's group of investors was in control of the corporation.

In 1958, Simon named Arthur B. Langlie as president of the company. Otis Wiese, who had been vice president, as well as editor and publisher of McCall's, had expected to be named president. When Langlie was named to the position, Wiese and a number of staffers resigned in protest. A Business Week article stated "The house of togetherness had come apart at the seams." Simon replaced Wiese with Herbert Mayes, who had been editor of Good Housekeeping.

Mayes did away with the "Togetherness" slant, and came up with a new slogan, "First Magazine For Women." He introduced additional color pages, and used more fiction. In 1962 Mayes became president and CEO of McCall Corporation.

From 1962 to 1965, John Mack Carter was editor of McCall's. Under his leadership, circulation rose to 8.4 million, making it the most popular magazine in the United States after Reader's Digest. In 1965, Carter left to become editor of Ladies' Home Journal. A rapid succession of editors followed Carter, including Robert Stein and James Fixx.

In 1969, Life magazine columnist Shana Alexander was named editor. Alexander had no editing experience, and at the time of her appointment stated "I have to educate myself about women's magazines, but I think I know something about women." Alexander left in 1971.

Robert Stein was editor from 1972 to 1986. During Stein's tenure, McCalls gained the slogan / subtitle "The Magazine for Suburban Women." After Stein left, the quick turnover of editors returned.

=== Change in ownership ===
Ownership of McCall's began to change nearly as fast as editors came and went. Norton Simon sold McCall's to the Pritzker family in 1973. Norton Simon kept the McCall pattern business, which continues under different ownership. In 1986, McCall's Publishing Company was bought by Time Inc. and Lang Communications. In 1989, McCall's was sold to The New York Times Company, and in 1994, German-based Gruner + Jahr announced plans to purchase their magazine business. Gruner + Jahr rebranded the magazine as Rosie in 2001 before selling it to Meredith Corporation in 2005. Throughout these transitions, the McCall pattern business remained separate and continued under different ownership.

=== Renaming to Rosie and cancellation ===
In 2000, entertainer Rosie O'Donnell became editorial director of McCall's. In 2001 McCall's was renamed Rosie. O'Donnell stated, "I wanted a magazine that celebrates real women, that understands that they care about more than waistlines or the latest makeup styles or fashions, that they want to be relevant and help each other and care about the world."

Rosie ceased publication at the end of 2002. O'Donnell said in a statement, "I decided I could not participate in a magazine that bears my name when I could not be assured it would reflect my vision, values and editorial direction." After publication of the long-running magazine ended, a highly publicized legal battle between O'Donnell and the publisher, Gruner + Jahr, began in 2003. Ultimately, the judge ruled against both sides and dismissed the case. Gruner + Jahr exited the U.S. magazine business in 2005, selling its women's magazine portfolio to the Meredith Corporation and its business magazine portfolio to Mansueto Ventures.

=== 2025 bankruptcy ===
In 2020, McCall’s then parent company, CSS Industries, was sold to IG Design Group Americas, Inc.

On June 5, 2025, IG Design Group Americas, Inc. was sold to Hilco Global for $1, who will also profit and receive 75% of all of the company's brands' sales. The company blamed rising U.S. tariffs as part of the decision. On July 3, 2025, IG Design Group Americas, Inc., filed for Chapter 11 bankruptcy protection with plans to wind down and sell its assets.

== Golden Mike Awards ==
From 1951 to 1967, McCall's, in partnership with American Women in Radio and Television (AWRT), presented the Golden Mike Award for Women in Radio and Television, making it the first "magazine with a national circulation which has ever paid tribute to the public service record of any group in radio and television," with the Golden Mikes being "the only awards given exclusively to women Broadcasters and Executives for public service accomplishments in the communications field." Award criteria were based "exclusively on civic engagement, community service, charity, health and safety.... Judges were commissioners of education, presidents of women's clubs, and senators." The 1964 awards ceremony was held in Tulsa, Oklahoma.

Notable Golden Mike Award-winners included:

- 1951 Helen Reichert for FYI: The Helen Faith Keane Show
- 1953 Agnes Moorehead, for her one-woman show Sorry, Wrong Number and its several subsequent re-recordings for Suspense
- 1954 Judith C. Waller for Ding Dong School
- 1956 Pauline Frederick
- 1957:
  - Helen Duhamel of KOTA-TV
  - Alma Vessells John — the first Black woman to receive the award
- 1959 Marge Miner of KQTV for her series of programs on cerebral palsy
- 1960:
  - Lillian Brown
  - Pauline Frederick — 2× winner
- 1964:
  - Lucy Jarvis of the NBC network
  - Ruth Lyons
  - Marlene Sanders of WNEW-TV
- 1965:
  - Genie Chance for her coverage of the 9.2-magnitude 1964 Alaska earthquake
  - Betty Lou Varnum for her series Status 6, which focused on the struggles of the handicapped in Iowa
- 1967 Lucy Jarvis of the NBC network — 2× winner
