= Giessen American High School =

American high school in Hesse, Germany

Information
- Established: 1985
- Closed: 2007
- Language: English
- Affiliation: Department of Defense Dependents Schools

Giessen American High School was a Department of Defense Dependents School (DoDDS) on the grounds of the United States Giessen Army Depot near Giessen (spelled Gießen in German), Hesse, Germany. Giessen American High School educated children of United States military, government and civilian personnel from 1985 until the facility's closure in 2007.

== History ==
The high school opened in 1985 in what was then central West Germany, after a period of construction that included the discovery of a 250-pound World War II-era bomb and intermittent protests by the German Green Party. The facility was notable for its placement in the midst of woodlands, surrounded by forest and foliage, such as rhododendrons and mushrooms, and has been described by those who worked there as "fairytale"-like and "prettiest [campus] in DoDDS Europe." Much of these unique attributes were due to environmental accommodations at the time of the school's planning and construction.

Faculty and staff comprised a mix of U.S. Government employees of the DoDDS agency, military spouses, and independent contract civilians (both German and American). From 1985-1996, the facility taught children in grades 9-12 (typically aged 14–18), utilizing a curriculum designed to approximate (and meet the graduation requirements of) a typical United States public high school. In 1996, continued drawdown of the United States Army presence in Germany led to a consolidation of school facilities, and students in grades 7 and 8 were moved to the high school location. At the time of its closing, the school was known as "Giessen American Middle/High School."

Prior to the establishment of Giessen American High School, students took buses and trains to Frankfurt American High School and were often housed in dormitories during the week, returning to their sponsors (typically parents)' quarters in and around Friedberg, Bad Nauheim, and Giessen on weekends and during holidays. The school closed in 2007, following the 2005 round of Base Realignment and Closure in Germany, in advance of the final closure of the Giessen Army Depot the following year. Though the grounds were returned to the German Federal government, they and the school buildings remained largely untouched in the years that followed, falling into disrepair.

The Giessen American High School mascot was the mythological Griffin and the school's colors were red and black. The school's student athletes, clubs, and activities traveled throughout Europe on a weekly basis to convene and compete with students from other DoDDS schools. Notable athletic achievements include the Griffins winning the European Basketball Championship in 1994 and having three players represent the school on the DODDS All Star Team.

== Notable alumni ==
- Benjamin Bryant
