= Lori Bryant-Woolridge =

American novelist

- Born: May 25, 1958 (age 68); California
- Education: Paint Branch High School; University of Maryland, College Park (BS)
- Occupation: Novelist
- Writing career
- Pen name: Lori Bryant Woolridge, Eden Davis
- Genres: Chick-lit, Romantic fiction, Romance
- Literary movement: Chick-lit
- Website: www.solcoach.co

Lori Anne Bryant-Woolridge (born May 25, 1958) is an African-American/Chinese-American author and speaker, known for contributions to the chick-lit genre.

== Early life ==
Bryant-Woolridge was born in the San Francisco Bay Area to a biracial father, Brig. Gen Albert Bryant Sr., and biracial Asian mother, RN Mable Lun. She was raised in both California and Silver Spring, Maryland. She attended Paint Branch High School (Montgomery County, Maryland) and graduated from the University of Maryland, College Park with a BS in Journalism.

Bryant-Woolridge is sister to U.S. Army Brigadier General Albert Bryant Jr; she currently has a niece and a nephew on active duty in the Army. Another nephew is former Obama Administration Department of Defense Fort Hood Shooting Task Force and "Don't Ask, Don't Tell" Repeal Working Group appointee and broadcaster Benjamin Bryant. (It was these and many other connections to the United States Military that led to the Femme Fantastik tour's original founding as a tour of military bases.)

== Writing career ==
Bryant-Woolridge made her debut as a novelist in 1999 when she published the novel Read Between the Lies. The book went on to become a best-seller, and in 2000 was nominated for a Golden Pen Award for Best Contemporary Fiction. Her second novel, Hitts & Mrs., was published in 2004, and made the Essence magazine bestseller list. Bryant-Woolridge's latest novel Weapons of Mass Seduction was published in April 2007.

The Power of WOW, subtitled A Guide to Unleashing the Confident, Sexy You (a non-fiction, self-help book), was published in July 2011. "Woolridge comes on like Judith Krantz with a social conscience." Publishers Weekly

Bryant-Woolridge has also contributed to several anthologies, such as Gumbo: A Celebration of African-American Writing (Harlem Moon, 2002), and Brown Sugar 3: Opposites Attract (Washington Square, 2004).

In the Spring of 2005, Bryant-Woolridge co-founded the Femme Fantastik Literary Tour, a book tour dedicated to showcasing the work of female authors of color.

== Broadcasting career and Emmy win ==
Bryant-Woolridge spent her early career in various television production and management roles at the ABC Television Network, Public Broadcasting Service (PBS), and Black Entertainment Television (BET). In 1983, Bryant-Woolridge was honored with the Emmy Award for Individual Achievement in Writing.

== Personal life ==
Bryant-Woolridge currently resides in Virginia and has two children: a son, who attended Wesleyan University in Connecticut, and is the founder and CEO of Playerslounge.co, and a daughter, who graduated from the University of Maryland, College Park, and is a photographer.

She is the co-founder of Mothers Off Duty, a nonprofit women's organization committed to aiding in the prevention of teen pregnancy and the promotion of continued education and parental responsibility. A certified spiritual/life coach, Bryant-Woolridge is the founder of Stiletto University, which promotes feminine confidence and sensual empowerment through its workshops and retreats; and The SOL Innovations Group, LLC a spiritual and life coaching group that specializes in feminine confidence, spiritual exploration, and creative confidence coaching.

== References and external links ==
- Best-Selling Books: Essence Book Club Pick, Essence Magazine, Essence.com, 2007.
- Femme Fantastik: Your Favorite Female Authors Team Up, America On-Line Black Voices Blog, 2007.
- Books that Changed After 9/11, @uthors on the Web.com, 2002.
- Official Lori Bryant-Woolridge Web Page
- Audio Interview with Lori Bryant Woolridge on Urban Reviews
