= Forever and a Day (soap opera) =

Serial drama podcast

- Genre: Serial drama
- Format: Podcast
- Language: English

Creative team
- Created by: Casey S. Hutchison
- Written by: Casey S. Hutchison Candice Mack Emmy Morgan

Cast and voices
- Narrated by: Casey S. Hutchison

Music
- Theme music composed by: Soundstripe

Production
- Length: 25-30 minutes (regular); 40-60 minutes (specials)

Publication
- No. of seasons: 4
- No. of episodes: 73
- Original release: August 3, 2020
- Provider: Anchor Podcasts
- Updates: Weekly

Related
- Website: www.faadseries.com

Forever and a Day is a serial drama, podcast, and audio drama created by Casey S. Hutchison. The podcast follows the lives of three families in the fictional town of Augustus, Illinois.

== Series overview ==
=== Season 1 ===
The first season focuses on Leslie Marshall's marriage to Alex Bennett after leaving her former high school sweetheart Colin Harper at the altar. Leslie and Alex are raising their son Aiden as Colin finds new love with schemer Emma Jensen, who's secretly working with Alex to bring Colin and the Harpers down. Colin's mother Elaine deals with her sister Melanie Walters coming to town with a huge secret that only Elaine's scheming husband Gunnar knows. And Stephanie Markum comes face-to-face with her stalker who happens to be her ex-boyfriend Donovan Aldridge. Donovan vows to reunite with his "Beautiful Blue" and start anew with her.

=== Season 2 ===
Season two sees the Harpers and the Bennetts' decades long feud come closer to a resolution as the family deals with the fallout of Katelynn Harper and Laken Bennett both being outed as lesbians publicly. Emma begins to fall for Colin and discovers she is pregnant. Alex and Leslie's marriage gets rocky; Alex sleeps with Danielle Fraser during his separation from Leslie. A dangerous woman named Dominique Bradford comes to town hell bent on settling a score with Leslie's uncle Gregory. A shocking death rocks Augustus. The season finale ends with Dominique holding everyone hostage at gunpoint, and three people being shot.

=== Season 3 ===
In season three, the town of Augustus is slowly healing from the aftermath of the shooting. Gossip blogger Danielle Fraser and her brother Jesse Jr. "JJ" deal with a family secret. Donovan adds to his list of people to terrorize. And Gregory's estranged son Dr. Christopher Marshall comes to town with trouble following him.

== Cast and characters ==
Character	Actor	Seasons			
Character	Actor	1	2	3	4
Gunnar Harper	Brett Lawerence	Main	Main	Recurring	Main
Elaine Harper	Elizabeth von Isser	Main	Main	Main	Main
Colin Harper	Quinn VanAntwerp	Main	Main	Main	None
Emma Jensen	Jeanne Young	Main	Main	Recurring	Main
Katelynn Harper	Lacretia Lyon	Main	Main	Main	Main
Melanie Walters	Beth Ehlers	Main	Main	Main	None
Steven Langenfeld	Aaron Clark	Recurring	Recurring	Recurring	Recurring
Jonah Bennett	Matthew Preston	Main	Main	Main	Main
Miranda Bennett	Renée Suran	Main	Main	Main	Main
Alexander "Alex" Bennett (#1)	Tyler David	Main	Main	Main	None
Alexander "Alex" Bennett (#2)	Kevin Caliber	None	None	Guest	Main
Leslie Marshall	Khalia Davis	Main	Main	Main	Main
Laken Bennett (#1)	Karolina Sivas	Main	None	None	None
Laken Bennett (#2)	Anna Burmeister	None	Main	Main	Recurring
Isaac Marshall (#1)	Brandon Larkins	Main	Recurring	None	None
Isaac Marshall (#2)	Tony D. Head	None	Main	Main	Main
Gregory Marshall	Benjamin Bryant	Main	Main	Recurring	Main
Dr. Christopher Marshall	Lance Guzman	None	None	Main	Main
Stephanie Markham	Kristina Sullivan	Main	Main	Main	Main
Danielle Fraser	Candice Mack	Main	Main	Main	Main
Jesse "JJ" Fraser (#1)	Tony Moore	Main	None	None	None
Jesse "JJ" Fraser (#2)	Sherrod Jackson	None	Main	Main	Main
Antwan Jeffries	Dorell Anthony	Recurring	Recurring	Main	Main
Felicia Richardson	Jonelle Allen	Recurring	Recurring	Main	Main
Lenore Parkhurst	Teri Limmer	Recurring	Main	Main	Main
Skye Parkhurst	Mackenzie Bell	Recurring	Main	Main	Guest
Donovan Aldridge	Michael Carr	Recurring	Main	Main	Main
Andrew Rutledge	Frank Dicopoulos	Recurring	Main	Main	Main
Lucinda Jensen	Claire Stadtmueller	None	Main	Main	Recurring
Dominique Bradford	Lauren B. Martin	None	Main	Recurring	Recurring
Nicholas Larson	Michael Norberg	None	None	Recurring	None
Dr. Avery Randolph	Veronica Dang	None	Recurring	None	None
Dr. Callum Becker	Na'Vell J. Lee	None	Recurring	Recurring	Recurring
Isabelle Reed	Ashley Stewart	None	None	Main	Main
Graham Williams	Ron Schnittker	None	None	Main	Main
Olivia Bookman, N.P.	Emmy Morgan	None	Recurring	Recurring	Main
Rhonda Jeffries	Amelia Marshall	None	None	Recurring	Main
Detective Reynolds	BJ Van Griffin	None	None	Recurring	Recurring
Elise Granger	Ilene Kristen	None	None	Guest	None

== Production ==
"Forever and a Day" was created, in part, by Hutchison in response to the changing landscape for traditional daytime soap operas. For the first three seasons, Forever and a Day was distributed by JLJ Media. Starting with season three, the show moved to Anchor Podcasts.

== Reception ==
In 2022, the show received two nominations and one win at the 12th Annual Indie Series Awards, during the program's inaugural year for Audio Fiction categories. The show was nominated for "Best Actor - Audio Fiction" (Benjamin Bryant as "Gregory Marshall") and "Best Ensemble - Audio Fiction," becoming the ISA's first-ever winner in that category.
