= Station to Station (2021 film) =

2021 American independent drama film

- Directed by: Benjamin Bryant
- Written by: Benjamin Bryant
- Produced by: Benjamin Bryant; Tommy Zamberlan; David Eggers II; Francis McGrath; Diann Lewis-Charles; Matthew Weaver; Christopher Matteis
- Starring: David Eggers II; Jordan Getty; Cate Farrow; Andrew Cawley with Benedikt Sebastian
- Cinematography: Jake Simpson
- Edited by: Benjamin Bryant
- Music by: Francis McGrath
- Production company: Bryant Zamberlan Group
- Distributed by: BZ/MP
- Release dates: November 9, 2021 (Las Vegas International Film and Screenwriting Festival); January 8, 2022 (United States)
- Running time: 128 minutes
- Country: United States
- Language: English

Station to Station (released in Germany and Austria as Las Vegas und Andere Stationen) is a 2021 psychological drama written and directed by Benjamin Bryant. Filmed in a production bubble during the coronavirus pandemic, Station to Station was selected as the opening night feature for the 2021 Las Vegas International Film and Screenwriting Festival, where it received multiple jury nominations including for Best Film, and won two, including the festival's Audience Award. The film was first released wide in the United States on January 8, 2022.

== Plot ==
After learning a long-held family secret, Major Tom Ryan (named for David Bowie's performance persona Major Tom) the son of a Hamptons housekeeper moves to Las Vegas, where he initially finds work as a handyman and has a brief romance with his boss' daughter. After losing his job and girlfriend on the same day, Tom accepts a job offer from Jordan, a stranger he meets out on the town. While Tom is hired to perform maintenance work, he grows increasingly immersed in Jordan's fast-moving Vegas world of youthful excess, easy temptation, and short-term rewards. Tom soon develops close bonds with the eclectic group of people who work for Jordan; as well as a budding romance with Sarah, the brash young woman living across the street.

While Tom's new world seems ideal for a young man seeking to lose himself in the present, emotional remnants of the painful past he left behind in New York start to emerge. Tom pushes even harder to forget, straining his new relationships and creating both internal and external pressures. In a dramatic series of third-act events, it becomes clear to all involved that Tom's unresolved issues make his presence subtly destructive and destabilizing.

== Production ==
Station to Station was conceived, written, cast, and filmed during the coronavirus pandemic. Principal photography took place on location in Las Vegas, Nevada, in September and October 2021, with actors living and working in a "bubble," eating together onsite and unable to do any sightseeing on their days off. Bryant and producer Tommy Zamberlan scheduled the 11-day principal shoot to minimize the amount of time cast and crew were on set. Changes to the script and desired scene blocking to minimize unnecessary physical proximity for cast and crew were made. Additional material and a reshoot of the scenes involving Tom and his first girlfriend Jennifer (Cheyenne Alexsys) were reshot in early spring in two locations outside of Bryant and Zamberlan's home base of Washington D.C.

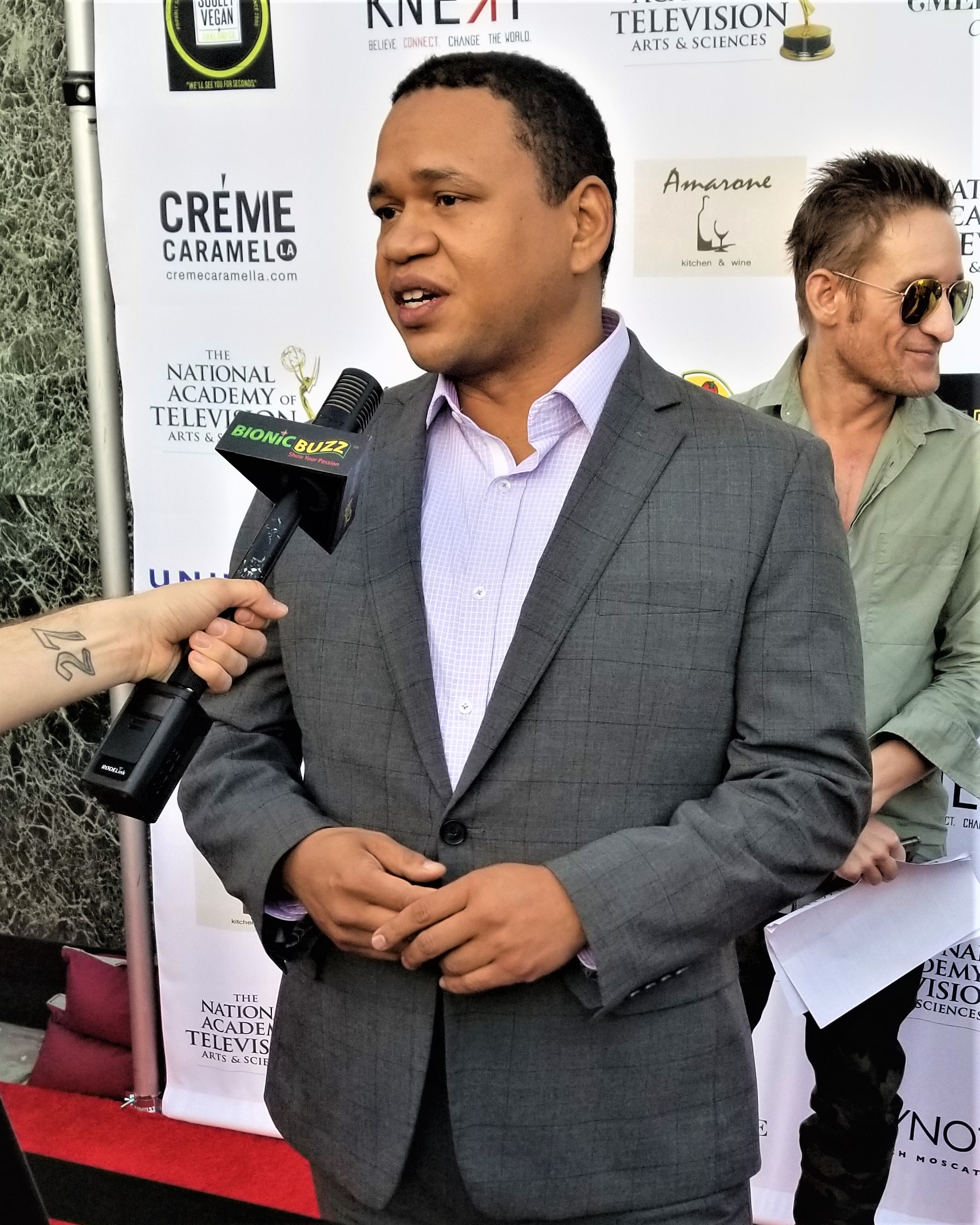
Station to Station writer-director Benjamin Bryant

Plans to shoot at real life bars, restaurants, and other Las Vegas locations fell through or were changed due to local coronavirus mandates and related closures. A key scene between the characters of Jordan and Tom at a nightclub was shot on a set when the planned location canceled two days prior, and an extended series of scenes scripted to move throughout a hotel was changed to take place entirely within a suite due to restrictions at the location. Writer-director Bryant noted his initial frustration with these restrictions, but felt the ultimately less ambitious scope and scale of the film allowed for a smaller, more intimate experience for viewers, and may have improved the film creatively and created an affinity for the city within the cast and crew.

The film was shot on a microbudget of less than $25,000, with Bryant stating he is "proud to note" that the shoot was fully insured and all cast and crew on set were paid at the time of the shoot. Zamberlan also served as sound director/recordist, COVID-19 coordinator, set decorator, and assistant editor on the film; and Bryant also served as editor, colorist, production and costume designer, with savings achieved by both deferring compensation. Bryant and Zamberlan's existing joint ownership of professional film and sound equipment allowed the production to avoid camera, sound, and lighting equipment rental fees. Bryant noted the process of making Station to Station as a micro-budget film was complicated, involving "a lot of planning ahead of time, and a lot of compromise and trading-off of those plans when it came time to shoot."

=== Original songs and score ===
The film features an award-winning original electronic, part-experimental score by Austin-based musician and composer Francis McGrath, who co-wrote three original songs for the film with Bryant. The nu-disco "Sexy Nightmare" and dance duet "Closer to You" are featured within the film (in the nightclub scene when Tom and Jordan first meet), and the rock ballad "Changing Stations," performed by Jersey Boys star Jon Hacker, plays over the final moments of the film and the closing credits. The melodies of all three songs are woven into McGrath's original score. All three songs are credited as "performed by Francis McGrath featuring" singers Kimberly Pollini ("Sexy Nightmare"), Benjamin Bryant and Taryn Hacker ("Closer to You"), and Hacker ("Changing Stations").

The film's music, praised for both complementing the film's narrative and enhancing its emotional intensity, received multiple honors during the festival run, including "Best Musical Score" at the 2021 Las Vegas International Film and Screenplay Festival.

== Release ==
On October 31, 2021, the Las Vegas International Film and Screenwriting Festival revealed Station to Station to be an Official Selection for the 2021 program, and a finalist for the festival's "Best Drama Feature" honor. On November 5, the festival announced the film would debut as LVIFSF's opening night feature, making its world premiere on November 9, 2021. The film received a total of eight jury and festival nominations and won two. Additionally, it was selected by festival attendees as the "Audience Award winner."

Due to Coronavirus concerns, plans for a limited theatrical release beginning Thanksgiving weekend were scrapped in favor of a January 8, 2022 ticketed "virtual theatrical" global release, with streaming and TVOD availability in the United States starting mid-to-late Q1 2022. In late January 2022, the film's VOD distribution expanded to Germany and Austria under the title Las Vegas und Andere Stationen and in a series of regional international releases over the following weeks. On February 28, 2022, the film's producers announced that film would no longer be available via VOD platforms in Russia or Belarus, in response to the 2022 Russian invasion of Ukraine.

== Reception ==
Reviews of the film were favorable, with critics mostly praising the Bryant's approach to the subject matter and the acting performances in the film. Markos Papadatos of Digital Journal, found the film "compelling," "intense," and "provocative," praising the writing, direction, and acting, particularly David Eggers II in his role as Tom. Papadatos likened Bryant's "bold" film debut to that of Paul Thomas Anderson. K.P. Smith of We Are Entertainment News called the movie a "roller coaster ride" noting the story's twists and turns and a "deeply satisfying film," full of strong acting performances. FILMNET recommended the film to arthouse audiences "seeking an intricate exploration of identity, expression, and human connection," noting the film "pushes boundaries and invites audiences to question societal norms and personal judgments."

While Matt Cassidy of IndieEye found the film to be "a well-spun and twisty tale about relationships, trust and acceptance...and worthy of awards," specifically praising Bryant's ability to bring an ambitious and sprawling story with a large cast to the big screen in his debut film, he felt the film could have benefitted from more activity in its longer two-person scenes and fewer scenes utilizing handheld camera techniques. Cassidy noted his criticisms reflected "common indie film challenges," related to smaller crew sizes and budgets.

== Awards and nominations ==
Festival or Awards Program	Category	Nominee/Finalist(s)	Outcome	Notes
IndieEye Film Awards (July 2021)	Best Narrative Feature	Benjamin Bryant	Won	
IndieEye Film Awards (July 2021)	Best Actor	David Eggers II	Won	
IndieEye Film Awards (July 2021)	Best Ensemble Cast	Cast of Station to Station	Won	
IndieFEST Awards (August 2021)	Award of Merit w/ Special Mention	David Eggers II	Won	
IndieFEST Awards (August 2021)	Award of Merit - Writing / Script	Benjamin Bryant (writer) Matthew Weaver (additional literary material)	Won	
IndieFEST Awards (August 2021)	Award of Merit - Supporting Actor	Andrew Cawley	Won	
IndieFEST Awards (August 2021)	Award of Merit - Supporting Actor	Jordan Getty	Won	
IndieFEST Awards (August 2021)	Award of Merit - Film Score	Francis McGrath	Won	
IndieFEST Awards (August 2021)	Award of Merit - Asian^{see notes}	Benjamin Bryant	Won	Awarded for film achievement in inclusion and representation of people of Asian descent on and/or behind the camera.
IndieFEST Awards (August 2021)	Award of Recognition - Best Supporting Actress	Cate Farrow	Won	
New York Film & Television Festival (September 2021)	Original Song	"Changing Stations" Written by Francis McGrath and Benjamin Bryant	Semifinalist	
FILMHAUS Berlin (October 2021)	Best Feature	Benjamin Bryant	Nominated	
FILMHAUS Berlin (October 2021)	Best Original Concept	Benjamin Bryant	Nominated	
FILMHAUS Berlin (October 2021)	Best Feature Film Debut	Benjamin Bryant	Nominated	
FILMHAUS Berlin (October 2021)	Best Newcomer Director	Benjamin Bryant	Nominated	
FILMHAUS Berlin (October 2021)	Best Ensemble Cast	Cast of Station to Station	Nominated	
FILMHAUS Berlin (October 2021)	Best Film Score	Francis McGrath	Nominated	
FILMHAUS Berlin (October 2021)	Best Costume Design	Benjamin Bryant	Nominated	
Las Vegas International Film & Screenwriting Festival (November 2021)	Audience Award	Benjamin Bryant; producers of Station to Station	Won	Selected by popular vote of audience attendees of LVIFSF 2021
Las Vegas International Film & Screenwriting Festival (November 2021)	Best Film	Benjamin Bryant; producers of Station to Station	Nominated	
Las Vegas International Film & Screenwriting Festival (November 2021)	Best Supporting Actress	Cate Farrow	Nominated	
Las Vegas International Film & Screenwriting Festival (November 2021)	Best Supporting Actor	Jordan Getty	Nominated	
Las Vegas International Film & Screenwriting Festival (November 2021)	Best Costume Design	Benjamin Bryant	Nominated	
Las Vegas International Film & Screenwriting Festival (November 2021)	Best LGBT Feature	Benjamin Bryant; producers of Station to Station	Won	Awarded for the inclusion and representation of LGBT characters and stories in film.
Las Vegas International Film & Screenwriting Festival (November 2021)	Best Musical Score	Francis McGrath	Won	McGrath was also nominated for "Best Film Score" in the festival's technical and performance categories.
Las Vegas International Film & Screenwriting Festival (November 2021)	Best Drama Feature	Benjamin Bryant	Nominated	
Art Film Spirit Awards (April 2023)	Best Score	Francis McGrath	Nominated	
Best Film Awards (May 2023)	Best Ensemble	Cast of Station to Station	Won	
Hercules Independent Film Festival (May 2023)	Best Feature Film	Benjamin Bryant; producers of Station to Station	Honorable Mention	
Berlin New Wave Film Festival (June 2023)	Best Film (over 40 minutes)	Francis McGrath	Semifinalist	
Berlin New Wave Film Festival (June 2023)	Best Actor	Francis McGrath	Finalist	
Berlin New Wave Film Festival (June 2023)	Best Debut by a Filmmaker	Benjamin Bryant	Won	
IWFA World Film Awards	Best American Film	Benjamin Bryant	Won	
