= Beth Ehlers =

American actress

- Born: July 23, 1968 (age 57); Queens, New York
- Occupation: Actress
- Years active: 1981–2009, 2012, 2020–
- Spouses: Dr. William Parsons (m. 1991; div. 1992) Matthew Christian (m. 1996; div. 2005)
- Children: 2

Beth Ehlers /ˈɛlərz/ (born July 23, 1968) is an American actress. She is known for playing Harley Cooper, between 1987 and 2008, on CBS's daytime drama Guiding Light.

== Career ==
Ehlers grew up in New York City and begin appearing in television commercials at the age of nine. As a child actress, her first role was in the 1981 television film Family Reunion starring Bette Davis. She was cast in several other television films, including "In Defense of Kids" and "Mystery at Fire Island". Her big screen debut was in the film The Hunger with David Bowie and Catherine Deneuve. She was also featured in the feature film Hiding Out and the NBC TV series The Best Times which was in the vein of Fast Times at Ridgemont High, and the later, Beverly Hills 90210.

To date, Ehlers' role of note has been her portrayal of Harley Cooper on Guiding Light, a role she originally played from 1987 to 1993. The character of Harley was a bad girl with a heart of gold — the character was introduced giving birth to her illegitimate daughter in the back seat of a car — and Ehlers' portrayal won her praise and many fans, eventually making the character of Harley a linchpin character.

Ehlers left the show in 1993, along with co-star Mark Derwin, to relocate to California. After her relationship with Derwin ended, Ehlers worked as a production assistant on commercials and music videos. On January 17, 1997, she returned to Guiding Light for the soap's 60th anniversary. Fan response was so overwhelmingly positive that the producers asked Ehlers to return as a contract player. During her time on Guiding Light, she was nominated five times for a Daytime Emmy (for Outstanding Younger Actress, in 1992 and 1993; Outstanding Supporting Actress in a Drama Series, in 1999 and 2002; and, in 2006, for Outstanding Lead Actress in a Drama Series). She was the first daytime actress to ever be nominated in all three categories.

In 2005, fans voted Ehlers and former co-star Ricky Paull Goldin, as their characters Harley and Gus, the top couple in "The Most Irresistible Combination" contest (which was partially sponsored by Procter & Gamble, the company that produces Guiding Light).

In 2006, Ehlers became part of a collaboration between the show and Marvel Comics when her character was tagged to appear on a special fantasy episode of the show as a superheroine, named "The Guiding Light" after the show itself.

In 2007, in an episode celebrating the 70th anniversary of Guiding Light, the current cast portrayed actors and behind-the-scenes personnel from the early years of the series (both in radio and television). Ehlers had a central role in the episode with her portrayal of Irna Phillips. Phillips was the creator of Guiding Light and many other soap operas; she was often credited with creating the soap opera genre.

In June 2008, Ehlers left Guiding Light to join the cast of All My Children in the newly created role of Taylor Thompson, an Army lieutenant of the Iraqi war who believed she had lost her fiancé, Brot Monroe (portrayed by real-life war veteran and now actor/spokesman J.R. Martinez), in action. The move from Guiding Light to All My Children led to an onscreen reunion with her former Guiding Light co-star Ricky Paull Goldin, who had also moved to All My Children to portray Dr. Joseph "Jake" Martin.

In 2010 Ehlers was announced to be in the cast of The SFN's television series River Ridge. In 2020, she joined the cast of the serial drama podcast Forever and a Day.

== Filmography ==
Year	Film	Role	Notes
1981	Family Reunion	Jamcie Lyman	Television movie
1981	CBS Children's Mystery Theatre	Dah Littlewood	Episode: "Mystery at Fire Island"
1983	The Wilder Summer	Janis	Television movie
1983	In Defense of Kids	Marie Shurtleff	Television movie
1983	The Hunger	Alice Cavender	Film
1984	Things Are Looking Up	Mia Braithwaite	Television pilot: became The Best Times
1985	The Best Times	Mia Braithwaite	Main role, 6 episodes
1987	Hiding Out	Chloe	Film
1987–1993, 1997–2008	Guiding Light	Harley Cooper	Contract role: September 1987 – September 28, 1993; guest role: January 21–30, 1997; contract role: May 29, 1997 – June 23, 2008
2001	Supertalk	N/A	Short film
2002	A Wedding Story: Josh and Reva	Harley Cooper	Television movie from Guiding Light
2003	Crossing Over with John Edward	Herself	
2004	Law & Order: Special Victims Unit	Mrs. Kester	Episode: "Home"
2008–2009	All My Children	Taylor Thompson	Regular role: July 24, 2008 – September 21, 2009
2012	River Ridge	Coryn Foster	Main role, 6 episodes
2020–	Forever and a Day (soap opera)	Melanie Walters	Series Regular, June 2020 – present
