= Read Between the Lies =

1999 novel by Lori Bryant-Woolridge

- Cover of October 2000 paperback edition
- Author: Lori Bryant-Woolridge
- Language: English
- Genre: Novel
- Publisher: Doubleday (Hardcover) Warner Books (Paperback)
- Publication date: April 20, 1999
- Publication place: United States
- Media type: Print (Hardcover (1999) and Paperback (2000))
- Pages: 464 pp (Hardcover) 528 pp (Paperback)
- ISBN: 0-385-49214-6 (Hardcover edition) ISBN 0-446-60911-0 (Paperback edition)
- OCLC: 40061310
- Dewey Decimal: 813/.54 21
- LC Class: PS3573.O6863 R43 1999

Read Between the Lies is the first novel by Emmy-winning author, Lori Bryant-Woolridge. Read Between the Lies combines chick lit and "beach book" styles with themes of racial diversity and adult illiteracy.
