= Chester Himes =

American novelist (1909–1984)

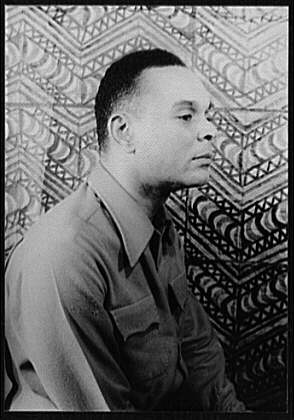
- Himes in 1946, photo by Carl Van Vechten
- Born: Chester Bomar Himes; July 29, 1909; Jefferson City, Missouri, US
- Died: November 12, 1984 (aged 75); Moraira, Spain
- Occupation: Novelist
- Spouses: Jean Lucinda Johnson (m. 1937; div. 1978) Lesley Packard (m. 1978)
- Writing career
- Period: 1934–1980
- Genres: Hardboiled crime fiction, detective fiction
- Notable work: Harlem Detective series of novels
- Notable awards: Grand Prix de Littérature Policière

Chester Bomar Himes (July 29, 1909 – November 12, 1984) was an American writer. His notable works include the debut novel If He Hollers Let Him Go, published in 1945, and the Harlem Detective series featuring two black policemen called Grave Digger Jones and Coffin Ed Johnson. In 1958, Himes won France's Grand Prix de Littérature Policière. His works have been adapted to film four times.

== Life ==
=== Early life ===
Chester Himes was born in Jefferson City, Missouri, on July 29, 1909, to Joseph Sandy Himes and Estelle Bomar Himes; his father was a professor of industrial trades at a black college, and his mother, prior to getting married, was a teacher at Scotia Seminary. Chester Himes grew up in a middle-class home in Missouri. When he was about 12 years old, his father took a teaching job in the Arkansas Delta at Branch Normal College (now University of Arkansas at Pine Bluff), and soon a tragedy took place that would profoundly shape Himes's view of race relations. He had misbehaved and his mother made him sit out a gunpowder demonstration that he and his brother, Joseph Jr., were supposed to conduct during a school assembly. Working alone, Joseph mixed the chemicals; they exploded in his face. Rushed to the nearest hospital, the blinded boy was refused treatment because of Jim Crow laws. "That one moment in my life hurt me as much as all the others put together", Himes wrote in his autobiography The Quality of Hurt.

I loved my brother. I had never been separated from him and that moment was shocking, shattering, and terrifying....We pulled into the emergency entrance of a white people's hospital. White clad doctors and attendants appeared. I remember sitting in the back seat with Joe watching the pantomime being enacted in the car's bright lights. A white man was refusing; my father was pleading. Dejectedly my father turned away; he was crying like a baby. My mother was fumbling in her handbag for a handkerchief; I hoped it was for a pistol.

The family later settled in Cleveland, Ohio. His parents' marriage was unhappy and eventually ended in divorce.

=== Prison and literary beginnings ===
In 1925, Himes's family left Pine Bluff and relocated to Cleveland, Ohio, where he attended East High School. He attended Ohio State University where he became a member of Alpha Phi Alpha fraternity, but was expelled for playing a prank. In late 1928, he was arrested and sentenced to jail and hard labor for 20 to 25 years for armed robbery and sent to Ohio Penitentiary. In prison, he wrote short stories and had them published in national magazines. He stated that writing in prison and being published was a way to earn respect from guards and fellow inmates, as well as to avoid violence.

His first stories appeared in 1931 in The Bronzeman and, starting in 1934, in Esquire. His story "To What Red Hell" (published in Esquire in 1934) as well as to his novel Cast the First Stone – only much later republished unabridged as Yesterday Will Make You Cry (1998) – dealt with the catastrophic prison fire Himes witnessed at Ohio Penitentiary in 1930.

In 1934, Himes was transferred to London Prison Farm and in April 1936 was released on parole into his mother's custody. Following his release, he worked at part-time jobs while continuing to write. During this period, he came into contact with Langston Hughes, who facilitated Himes's entree into the world of literature and publishing.

In 1937, Himes married Jean Johnson.

=== First books ===
In the 1940s, Himes spent time in Los Angeles, working as a screenwriter but also producing two novels, If He Hollers Let Him Go (1945) and Lonely Crusade (1947), which charted the experiences of the great migration, drawn by the city's defense industries, and their dealings with the established black community, fellow workers, unions and management. He also provided an analysis of the Zoot Suit Riots for The Crisis, the magazine of the NAACP.

Mike Davis in City of Quartz: Excavating the Future of Los Angeles, describing the prevalence of racism in Hollywood in the 1940s and '50s, cites Himes' brief career as a screenwriter for Warner Brothers, terminated when Jack L. Warner heard about him and said: "I don't want no niggers on this lot." Himes later wrote in his autobiography:

Up to the age of thirty-one I had been hurt emotionally, spiritually and physically as much as thirty-one years can bear. I had lived in the South, I had fallen down an elevator shaft, I had been kicked out of college, I had served seven and one half years in prison, I had survived the humiliating last five years of Depression in Cleveland; and still I was entire, complete, functional; my mind was sharp, my reflexes were good, and I was not bitter. But under the mental corrosion of race prejudice in Los Angeles I became bitter and saturated with hate.

Back on the East Coast Himes received a scholarship at the Yaddo artists' community, where he stayed and worked in May and June 1948, in a room opposite Patricia Highsmith's.

=== Emigration to France ===
Himes separated from his wife, Jean, in 1952, and the following year he began a period of travels by boarding a ship to France. By the 1950s, he had decided to settle permanently in France, a country he liked in part due to his popularity in literary circles. In Paris, Himes was friends with his contemporaries; the political cartoonist Oliver Harrington and fellow expatriate writers Richard Wright, James Baldwin and William Gardner Smith.

In Paris in the late 1950s Chester met his second wife, Lesley Packard, when she interviewed him for the Herald Tribune; she wrote a fashion column there under the name of "Monica". He described her as "Irish-English with blue-gray eyes and very good looking"; he also saw her courage and resilience, Chester said to Lesley: "You're the only true color-blind person I've ever met in my life." After he suffered a stroke, in 1959, Lesley quit her job and nursed him back to health. She cared for him for the rest of his life, and worked with him as his informal editor, proofreader, confidante and, as the director Melvin Van Peebles dubbed her, "his watchdog". After a long engagement, they were married in 1978, as Chester Himes was still legally married to his first wife, Jean, and only able to gain a divorce that year.

Lesley and Chester faced adversities as a mixed-race couple, but they prevailed. Their circle of political colleagues and creative friends included towering figures Langston Hughes, Richard Wright, Malcolm X, Carl Van Vechten, Picasso, Jean Miotte, Ollie Harrington, Nikki Giovanni, Ishmael Reed and John A. Williams. Williams based the main character of his 1967 novel The Man Who Cried I Am on Himes. Bohemian life in Paris would in turn lead Lesley and Chester to the South of France and finally on to Spain, where they lived until Chester's death in 1984.

=== Later life and death ===
In 1969, Himes moved to Moraira, Spain, where he died in 1984 from Parkinson's disease, at the age of 75. He is buried at Benissa cemetery.

== Critical reception and biography ==
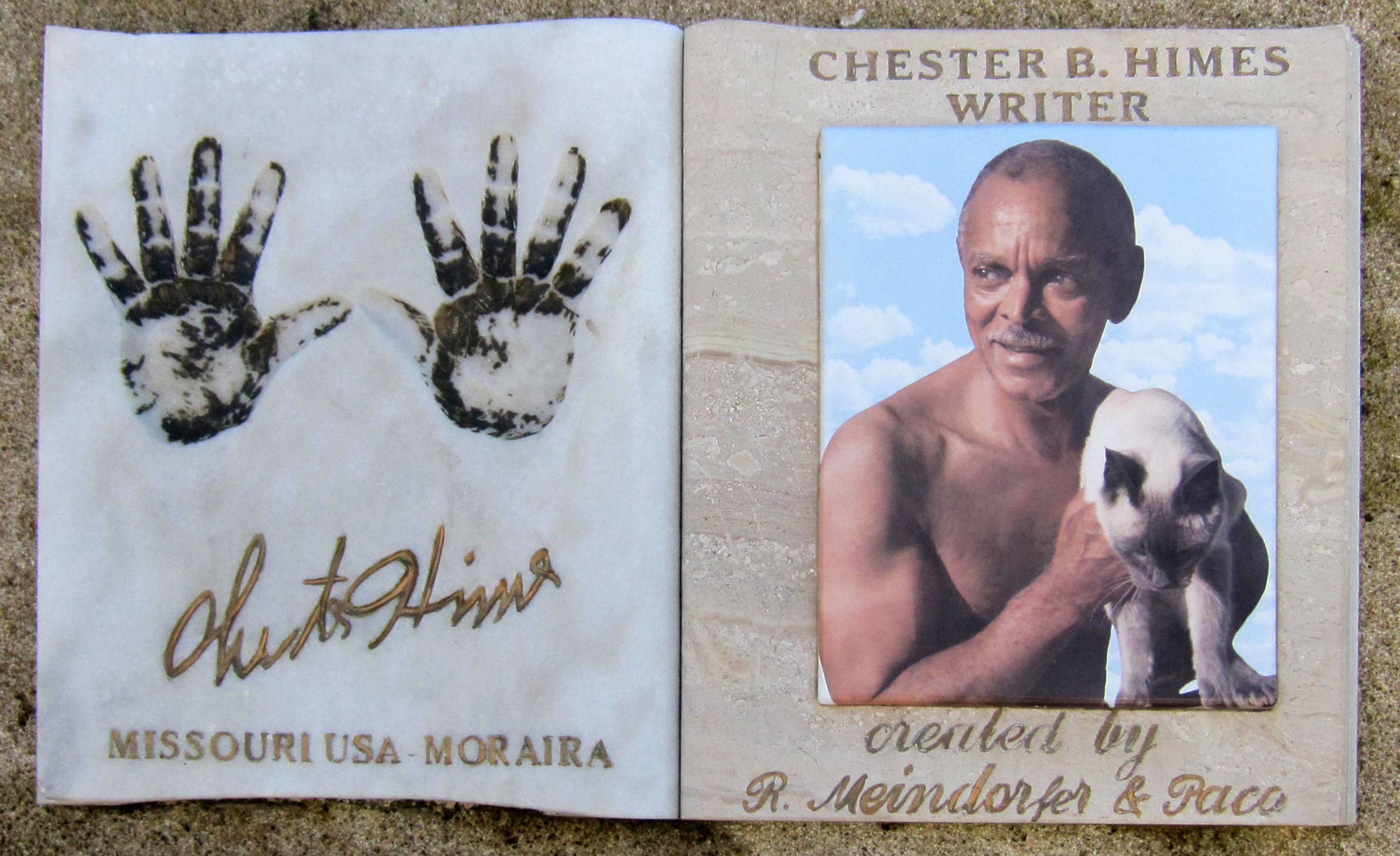
Part of a memorial to Himes in Moraira

Some regard Himes as the literary equal of Dashiell Hammett and Raymond Chandler. Ishmael Reed says: "[Himes] taught me the difference between a black detective and Sherlock Holmes" and it would be more than 30 years until another black mystery writer, Walter Mosley and his Easy Rawlins and Mouse series, had even a similar effect. S. A. Cosby in The New York Times also positively compared Himes to Chandler and Hammett, enjoying his writing of the "Black experience" and skepticism regarding the American Dream. Cosby also opined that Himes' works influenced future writers and cited his Harlem cycle as being among his favorite work.

In 1996, Himes's widow Lesley Himes went to New York to work with Ed Margolies on the first biographical treatment of Himes's life, entitled The Several Lives of Chester Himes, by long-time Himes scholars Edward Margolies and Michel Fabre, published in 1997 by University Press of Mississippi. Later, novelist and Himes scholar James Sallis published a more deeply detailed biography of Himes called Chester Himes: A Life (2000).

A detailed examination of Himes's writing and writings about him can be found in Chester Himes: An Annotated Primary and Secondary Bibliography compiled by Michel Fabre, Robert E. Skinner, and Lester Sullivan (Greenwood Press, 1992).

External videos
- Presentation by Lawrence Jackson on Chester B. Himes: A Biography, September 1, 2018, C-SPAN

In 2017, Lawrence P. Jackson published a significant biography of Himes, more than 600 pages in length, titled Chester B. Himes: A Biography. Reviewing the biography for Johns Hopkins Magazine, Bret McCabe noted it makes the case that while "[Himes's] debut, If He Hollers Let Him Go (1945), is as admired today as it was in its time[...] its follow-up, Lonely Crusade (1947), is overlooked and underappreciated, and positions it as a key text in reckoning both Himes's subsequent career and later works."

== Works ==
Himes's novels encompassed many genres including the crime novel/mystery and political polemics, exploring racism in the United States.

Chester Himes wrote about African Americans in general, especially in two books that are concerned with labor relations and African-American workplace issues. If He Hollers Let Him Go—which contains many autobiographical elements—is about a black shipyard worker in Los Angeles during World War II struggling against racism, as well as his own violent reactions to racism. Lonely Crusade is a longer work that examines some of the same issues.

Cast the First Stone (1952) is based on Himes's experiences in prison. It was Himes's first novel but was not published until about ten years after it was written. One reason may have been Himes's treatment of a homosexual relationship in an unusually candid style for the time. Originally written in the third person, it was rewritten in the first person in a more "hard-boiled" style. Yesterday Will Make You Cry (1993), published after Himes's death, restored the original manuscript. The restored 1998 edition includes a 1997 introduction by filmmaker and writer Melvin Van Peebles.

Himes also wrote a series of Harlem Detective novels featuring Coffin Ed Johnson and Gravedigger Jones, New York City police detectives in Harlem. The novels feature a mordant emotional timbre and a fatalistic approach to street situations. Funeral homes are often part of the story, and funeral director H. Exodus Clay is a recurring character in these books.

The titles of the series include A Rage in Harlem, The Real Cool Killers, The Crazy Kill, All Shot Up, The Big Gold Dream, The Heat's On, Cotton Comes to Harlem, and Blind Man with a Pistol; all written between 1957 and 1969. The final entry in the series was to be Plan B, published posthumously in 1983.

Cotton Comes to Harlem was made into a movie in 1970, which was set in that time period, rather than the earlier period of the original book. A sequel, Come Back, Charleston Blue, based upon The Heat's On, was released in 1972. For Love of Imabelle was made into a film under the title A Rage in Harlem in 1991. In the 1980s, British publisher Allison and Busby reprinted several of the Harlem detective novels in editions that featured paintings by Edward Burra on the covers.

In May 2011, and again in 2020 Penguin Modern Classics in London republished five of Himes's detective novels from the Harlem Cycle. The literary estate is overseen by Sarah Pirozek, daughter of Lesley's best and oldest friend.

=== Novels and stories ===
- Black on Black: Baby Sister and selected writings. London: Michael Joseph. 1942.
- If He Hollers Let Him Go. NY: Doubleday. 1945.
- Lonely Crusade. NY: Knopf. 1947.
- Cast the First Stone. NY: Coward-McCann. 1952.
- The Third Generation. NY: New American Library. 1954.
- The Primitive. NY: New American Library. 1955. See The End of a Primitive, 1990.
- For Love of Imabelle. Greenwich, CN: Fawcett. 1957. Alternate titles: A Rage in Harlem (1985 Vintage Books, New York), The Five-cornered square.
- The Real Cool Killers. NY: Avon Nook. 1959.
- The Crazy Kill. NY: Avon. 1959.
- The Big Gold Dream. NY: Avon Publications. 1960.
- All Shot Up. London: Panther. 1960.
- Pinktoes. Paris: Olympia Press. 1961.
- A Case of Rape. Paris: Editions Les yeux ouverts. 1963.
- Cotton Comes to Harlem. NJ: Chatham Book. 1964.
- The Heat's On. NY: Putnam. 1966.
- Run Man Run. NY: G.P. Putnam. 1966.
- Blind Man with a Pistol. NY: W. Morrow. 1969.
- Plan B. Paris: Lieu Commun (French). 1983.
- The End of a Primitive. London: Allison & Busby. 1990. From CIP data: Restores the work in the form the author intended, and includes his introduction, not previously published.
- The Collected Stories of Chester Himes. New York: Thunder's Mouth Press. 1990. ISBN 9781560250203. With an introduction by Calvin Hernton.
- Yesterday Will Make You Cry. NY: W.W. Norton. 1997. Complete and unexpurgated text of Himes's first autobiographical novel, originally published as Cast the First Stone (1953).

=== Autobiography ===
- The Quality of Hurt: The Autobiography of Chester Himes, Volume 1. Garden City NY: Doubleday. 1971.
- My Life of Absurdity: The Autobiography of Chester Himes, Volume 2. 1972.

A useful companion to the two volumes of autobiography is Conversations with Chester Himes, edited by Michel Fabre and Robert E. Skinner, published by University Press of Mississippi in 1995.

=== Films based on novels ===
Four Chester Himes novels were made into feature films: If He Hollers, Let Him Go!, in which he was uncredited, directed by Charles Martin; Cotton Comes to Harlem, directed by Ossie Davis in 1970; Come Back, Charleston Blue (The Heat's On) (1972), directed by Mark Warren, and A Rage in Harlem (starring Gregory Hines and Danny Glover), directed by Bill Duke in 1991. Two Himes short stories "The Assassin of Saint Nicholas Avenue" and "Tang" have also been filmed as short subjects, the latter included as a segment in the 1994 anthology television film Cosmic Slop.

== Personal life ==
Himes was Catholic, but professed to be "not a good one". In 1959, he married Lesley Himes (née Packard), who was also his informal editor. She died in 2010.

== See also ==
- African-American literature
