= Benissa =

- Municipality
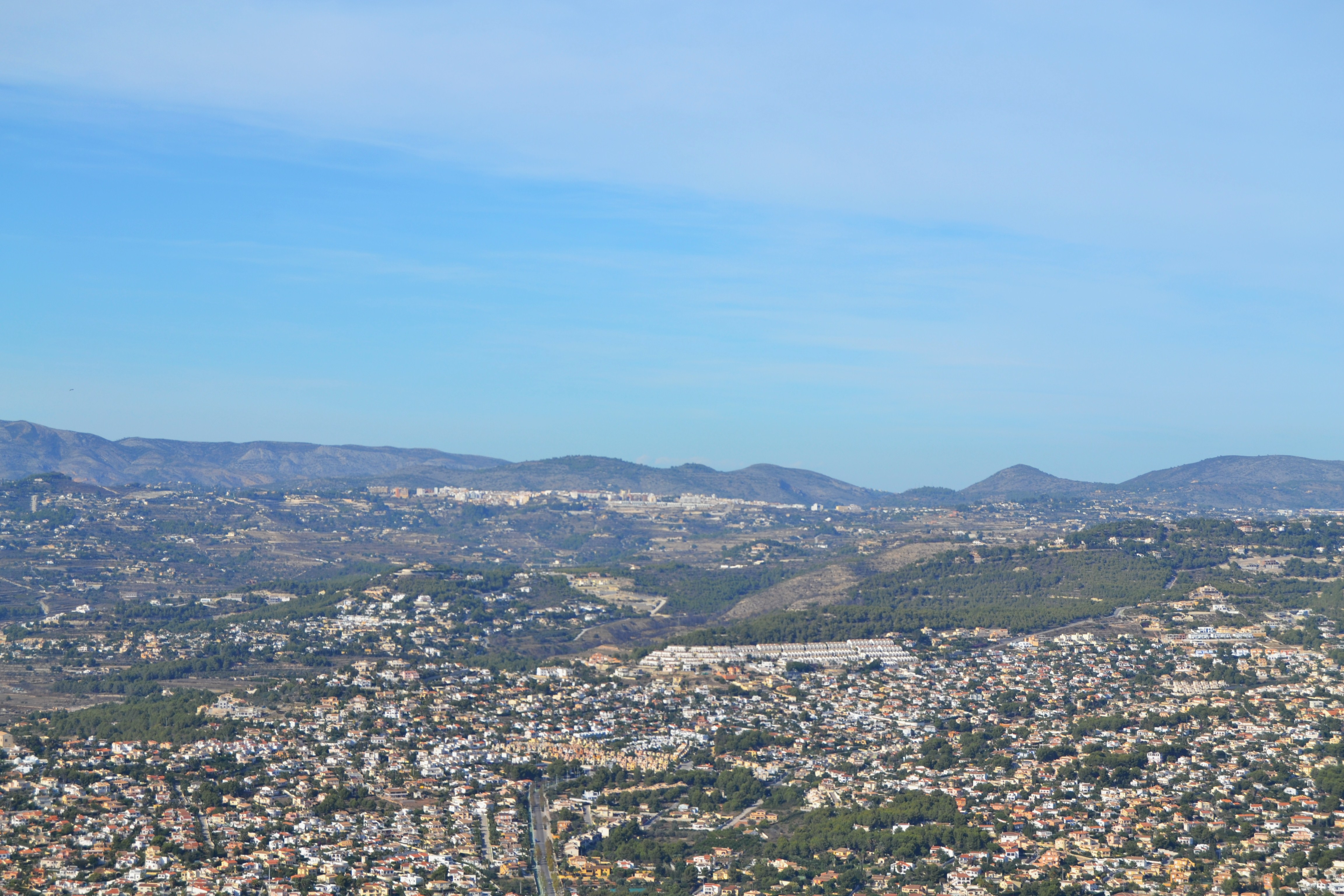

- Flag Coat of arms

- Location in the Province of Alicante Location in the Valencian Community Location in Spain
- Coordinates: 38°42′54″N 0°03′00″E
- Country: Spain
- Autonomous community: Valencian Community
- Province: Alicante
- Comarca: Marina Alta
- Judicial district: Dénia

Government
  - Mayor: Arturo Poquet (2019) (PP)

Area
  - Total: 69.71 km^{2} (26.92 sq mi)
- Elevation: 254 m (833 ft)

Population (2025-01-01)
  - Total: 12,471
  - Density: 178.9/km^{2} (463.3/sq mi)
- Demonym(s): Benissenc, benissenca
- Time zone: UTC+1 (CET)
  - Summer (DST): UTC+2 (CEST)
- Postal code: 03720
- Official language(s): Valencian
- Website: Official website

Benissa (Valencian: [beˈnisa], Spanish: Benisa [beˈnisa]) is a small town in Spain in the province of Alicante, 275 m above sea level, and one of the oldest towns on the Costa Blanca.

The municipality of Benissa has 4 km of coastline linking the towns of Moraira and Calp. The scenery of the area includes cliff tops, rocky coves, sandy beaches and tiny bays along the Benissa Costa. The territory of Benissa also contains terraced vineyards, mountains and palm trees. Spanish village houses, with doorsteps directly onto the street, internal courtyards and deceptively spacious inside. Old finques (a farm or country estate) sit on large plots amongst vineyards with panoramic views to the sea.

Nearby towns along the Costa Blanca are La Fustera, Cala dels Pinets, Cala de La Llobella, Cala l'Advocat, Baladrar and Cap Blanc before reaching Moraira.

== History ==
The toponym of Benissa comes from the Arabic tribal name Beni-Hisa or Beni-Eyce (sons of Christ). After the Christian reconquest (1248) by the troops of James II of Aragon, the town was settled by people from the Pyrenees, Catalonia and Aragon along with the former inhabitants, although the majority of the population remained Muslim for centuries. The last Muslim citizens were expelled in 1609.

Benissa, together with Altea, Calp and Teulada, formed a lordship, whose rulers included the Sicilian admiral Roger of Lauria. In the 15th and 16th centuries it suffered numerous attacks by African pirates.

== Main sights ==
The medieval town centre has been largely preserved with its town square, narrow streets, churches. Ironwork balconies and heraldic shields decorate the historic buildings. The Palace of Torres-Orduña is open to the public as a cultural centre and library. Benissa also has a strong Catholic tradition with a Franciscan seminary that has educated many Franciscans followers throughout Spain and a large Neo-Gothic church, the "Catedral de la Marina".

== Transportation ==
Travel to Benissa is easily made from Alicante or Valencia, through the highway A-7 or the N332. The closest airport is the Alicante airport, located 70 km to the south-west. The closest RENFE (Spanish mainline) railway station is in Alicante. There is an Alicante TRAM station in Benissa, connected to the network via Benidorm, though the service between Teulada and Dénia was suspended between 2016 and 2020, due to a line upgrade.

== Events ==
- Fira i Porrat de Sant Antoni. A mediaeval fair, in January
- Festes Patronals de la Puríssima Xiqueta, usually held in the last week of April to celebrate the Patron Saint of the town. Includes concerts, bull running, street processions and sporting events.
- Moros i Cristians, held at the end of June to celebrate the battles between the Moors and Christians in the 13th-15th century
