= King Alfred (disambiguation) =

Alfred the Great (c. 849–899) was an English king.

King Alfred may also refer to:

- King Aldfrith of Northumbria (died 704/705), whose name is written "Aelfrid" in some sources
- King Alfred (poem)
- HMS King Alfred, multiple separate ships of the British Royal Navy named after the 9th century monarch
- King Alfred Plan, the fictional CIA plan to prevent a black uprising
