= Teulada =

Teulada may refer to:

- Teulada, Sardinia, a comune in the Province of South Sardinia, Italy
- Teulada, Alicante, a municipality in the Province of Alicante, Valencian Community
