= Legacy (Navarro) =

Legacy is an oboe concerto composed by Óscar Navarro in 2015. The oboist Ramón Ortega Quero commissioned the piece in 2013 after hearing and enjoying Navarro's Segundo concierto para clarinete y orquesta. It was premiered on 17 April 2015 in Herford with the Nordwestdeutsche Philharmonie under Manuel Gómez López. The same week they toured North Rhine-Westphalia in Germany, giving five additional concerts in Bad Salzuflen, Minden, Detmold, Paderborn y Gütersloh. The Spanish premiere was to take place on 30 October 2015 in La Nucía (Alicante), with the Orquesta Sinfónica de la Región de Murcia (Murcia Symphony Orchestra) under Francisco Maestre, and on the following day on Teulada, but both were suspended.

The concerto's title refers to the legacy of every single composer to the oboe repertoire through the ages. According to Navarro, "With this concert, I want to leave my mark or legacy, with a view to the present and future".

== Instrumentation ==
The work is written for oboe solo and symphonic orchestra composed of two flutes (one doubling piccolo), two oboes, two clarinets, two bassoons, four horns, three trumpets, two trombones, bass trombone, tuba, timpani, glockenspiel, xilophone, percussion (suspended cymbal, claves, snare drum, castanets, tambourine, zills, wood block, bass drum, cymbals, triangle), harp, piano and strings. There is an arrangement made by the composer himself for wind band (the bass are reinforced through cellos and double basses, with no violins and violas).

A typical performance lasts 22 minutes. It has only one movement.
