= Penyal d'Ifac Natural Park =

Park in Spain

Penyal d'Ifac
- Peñón de Ifach
- IUCN category V (protected landscape/seascape)
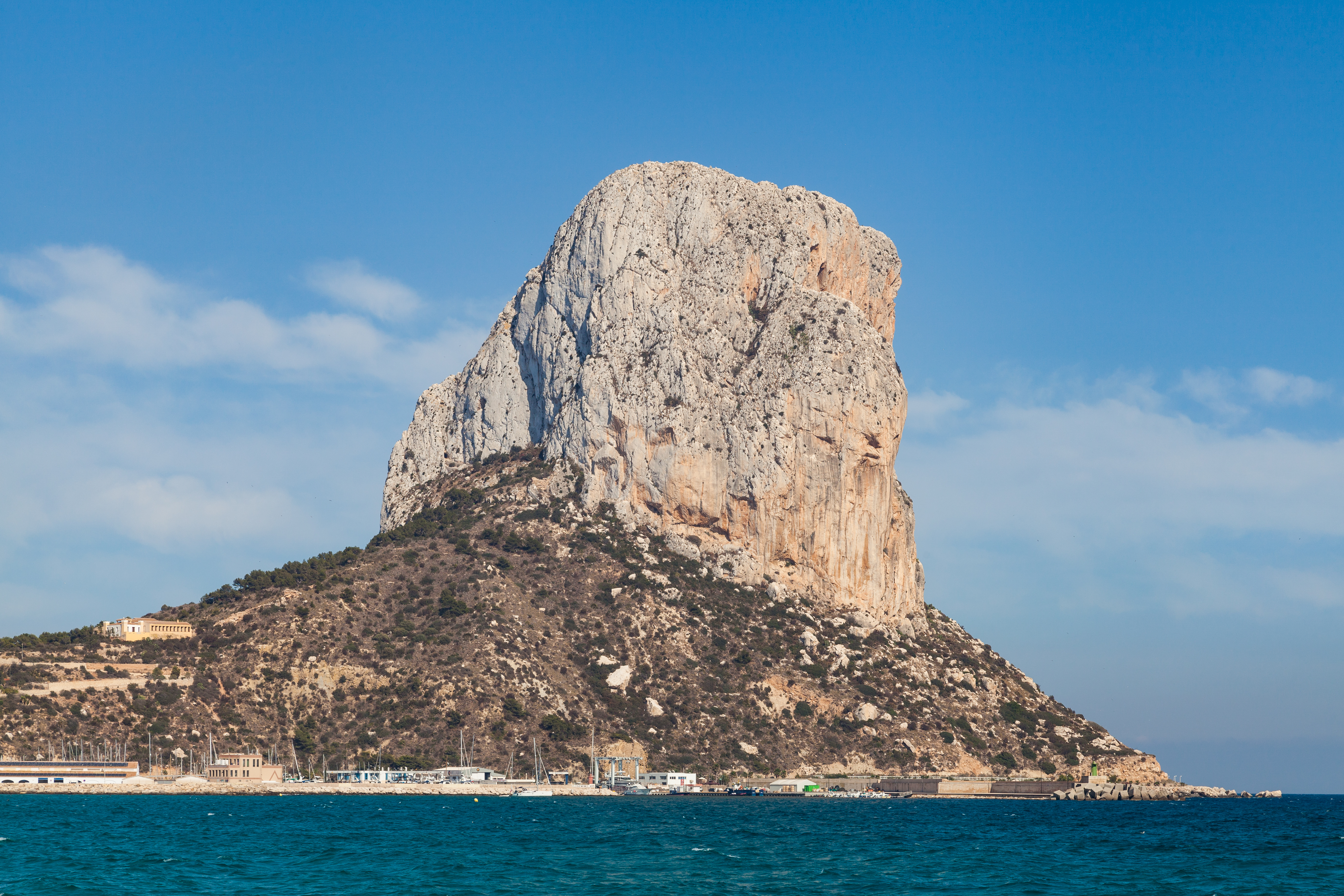
- Interactive map of Penyal d'Ifac
- Location: Marina Alta Comarca, Province of Alicante, Valencian Community, Spain
- Nearest city: Calpe (3.2 km (2 mi))
- Coordinates: 38°38′3″N 0°4′35″E
- Area: 47 ha (120 acres)
- Established: 1987
- Governing body: Generalitat Valenciana

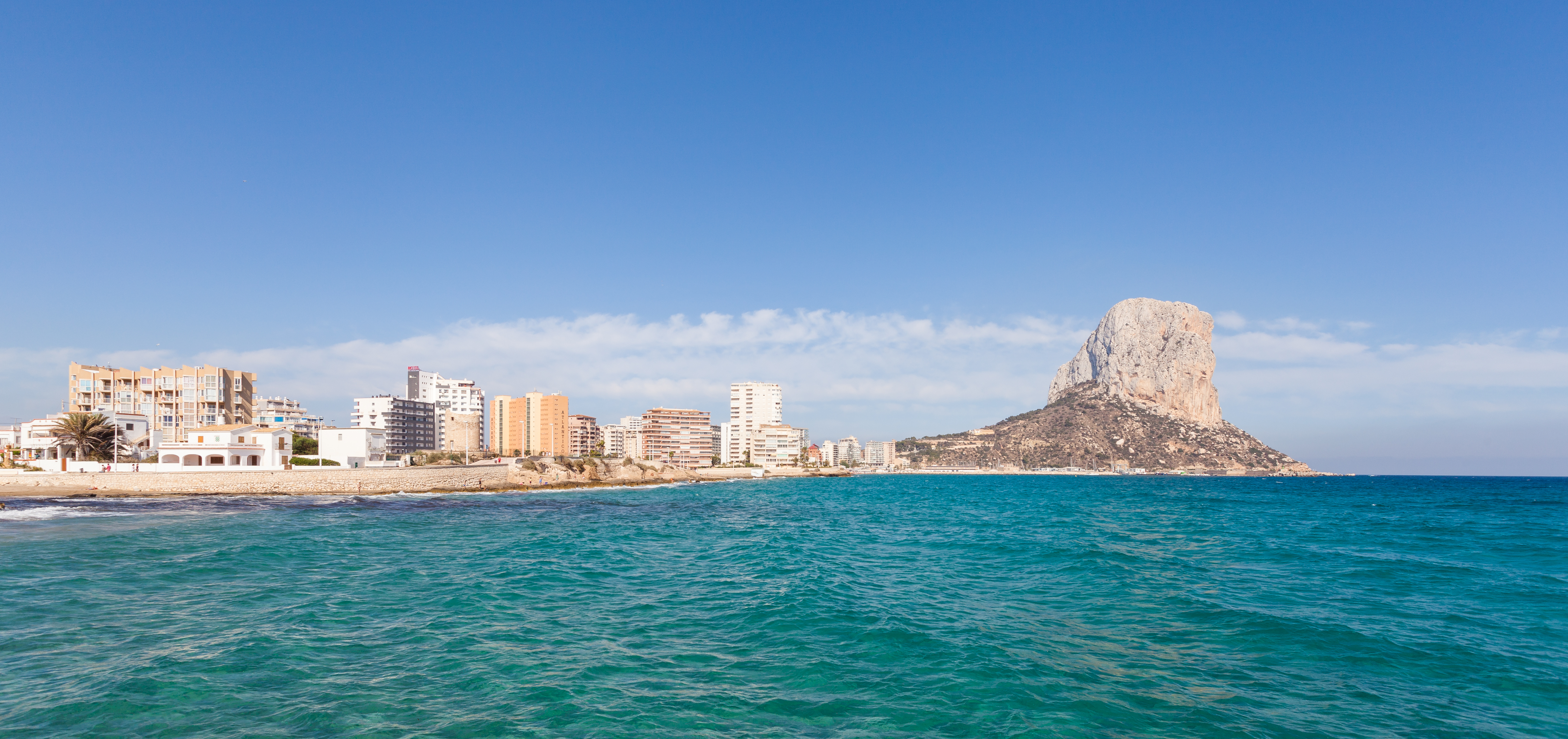
Penyal d'Ifac and beach

Penyal d'Ifac Natural Park (Spanish: Parque Natural del Peñón de Ifach, Valencian: Parc Natural del Penyal d'Ifac) is a natural park situated in Calpe, in the Valencian Community, Spain.

The Penyal d'Ifac is a massive limestone outcrop emerging from the sea and linked to the shore by an isthmus of rock debris. It is home to numerous rare plants, including a number of endemic species, and over 300 species of animals, and a nesting site for colonies of sea birds and other birds.

Rising to 332 metres (1,089 ft) in height, the rock is a striking visual feature of the Mediterranean coastline. Historically it was known to the Phoenicians as the Northern Rock, to distinguish it from its southern counterpart, the Rock of Gibraltar.

Behind Penyal d'Ifac is a large lagoon cut off from the sea by strips of sandy beach and extending inland to the coastal mountains. The wetland area around the lagoon is all that remains of the formerly much more extensive wetlands of the Marina Alta.

A protracted campaign to protect the site's natural diversity led to the area being granted natural park status in January 1987. With an area of 45 hectares (110 acres), it is the smallest natural park in Spain, possibly in Europe. The park ranges from sea level to an altitude of 332 metres at the summit of the rock (penyal in Valencian, peñón in Spanish).

From the top of the rock there are views over the surrounding villages and countryside and on a clear day as far across the sea as Ibiza in the Balearic Islands.

== Plant ecology ==
The rock's sheer cliffs and rocky escarpments, exposed to the sea winds on three sides, have created a variety of microhabitats that have fostered a diversity of specialised plant species. At the lowest levels, relatively deep soils with higher moisture content in areas protected from the sea have allowed the development of a typical Mediterranean scrub vegetation community including dwarf palms, juniper, lavender and white pine. Higher up as soils become thinner and more exposed to the sun and wind alpine plant species have colonised cracks and gullies in the rock. The Ifac silene, Silene hifacensis, a highly endangered species first discovered on the rock, has now disappeared from the locality; no more than 20 adult plants are thought to be left in the wild. Phoenix dactylifera palm species are naturalised in the area due to the massive public and private plantations nearby.

== Animal life ==
The rock face provides nesting sites for birds of prey including peregrine falcons and Eleonora's falcon, seabirds including gulls and cormorants, and other birds typical of rocky habitats. There are also semi-domesticated cats that live near the peak.

== Marine life ==
The seabed around Penyal d'Ifac is varied, with rocky, stony and sandy areas sheltering a very diverse marine community.
