= If He Hollers, Let Him Go! =

1968 film by Charles Martin

- Directed by: Charles Martin
- Screenplay by: Charles Martin
- Based on: If He Hollers Let Him Go (1945 novel) by Chester Himes
- Produced by: Charles Martin
- Starring: Dana Wynter; Raymond St. Jacques; Kevin McCarthy; Barbara McNair; Arthur O'Connell
- Cinematography: William W. Spencer
- Edited by: Richard K. Brockway
- Music by: Harry Sukman
- Production company: Forward Films
- Distributed by: Cinerama Releasing Corporation
- Release date: October 9, 1968
- Running time: 106 minutes
- Country: United States
- Language: English

If He Hollers, Let Him Go! is a 1968 American neo noir crime film written and directed by Charles Martin (1910–1983), based on the 1945 novel of the same title by Chester Himes. It follows an escaped black convict, James Lake, accused of murder. He tries to prove his innocence. The movie is rated R.

== Plot ==
The plot follows an escaped black convict, James Lake, who was falsely imprisoned for murder. He avoids a police search and is picked up by Leslie Whitlock. Leslie takes James to a mansion owned by his wife, Ellen. Leslie offers James $10,000 and a means of escape if he murders Ellen. James tries to warn Ellen of her husband's plans, but is unsuccessful. He flees the mansion and goes back into hiding from the police. During this, he is reminded of a past relationship with a nightclub singer, Lily. Also, he concludes that it is impossible for him to hide from the police by his lonesome. After he goes back to their mansion, James coerces the Whitlocks to get him through police checks and to take them to their mountain cabin. It is there where Mr. Whitlock reveals his murderous plan, after being deceived by James. Together, Ellen and James flee the cottage. They decide to go to the home of James's brother. He finds out that his brother married Lily, as she thought James would be imprisoned for life. Lily still agrees to help James prove his innocence. Lake, with help from his friends, finds the stepfather of the murdered girl. Carl Blair, the stepfather, is confronted in a warehouse and is intimidated into confessing that he killed his own daughter. Soon, Mr. Whitlock arrives with an escort of police officers. A firefight ensues, resulting in the death of Mr. Whitlock. Blair is arrested. Grateful, Ellen promises to use her wealth and power to clear Mr. Lake's name. During this quest, he faces discrimination.

== Music ==
The movie features three songs: A Man Has To Love, sung by Barbara McNair, written by Charles Martin and music by Sammy Fain; Can't Make It With the Same Man Twice, sung by Barbara McNair, written by Charles Martin and music by Sammy Fain; as well as So Tired, sung by Barbara McNair, written and composed by Coleridge-Taylor Perkinson. A soundtrack was released on April 30, 2012.

== Cast ==
- Dana Wynter as Ellen Whitlock
- Raymond St. Jacques as James Lake
- Kevin McCarthy as Leslie Whitlock
- Barbara McNair as Lily
- Arthur O'Connell as Prosecutor
- John Russell as Sheriff
- Ann Prentiss as Thelma Wilson
- Royal Dano as Carl Blair

== Production ==
The movie was produced and distributeded by Cinerama Releasing Corporation.

== Reception ==
=== Box office ===
There is no published information about the box office earnings for this film.

=== Critical response ===
Roger Ebert of The Chicago Sun-Times gave the film a harshly negative review, saying it was "trash" and claimed to represent African-Americans but "does not in any sense treat those actors with dignity or even decency" and in the end calls it "an evil film, a dishonest film, an ugly film."

=== Accolades ===
Accolades received by If He Hollers, Let Him Go!
Award	Date of ceremony	Category	Recipient(s)	Result	Ref.
NAACP Image Awards	November 5, 1970	Outstanding Lead Actress in a Motion Picture	Barbara McNair	Won	

== See also ==
- If He Hollers Let Him Go
