= Calpe =

Calpe Calp
- Town and municipality
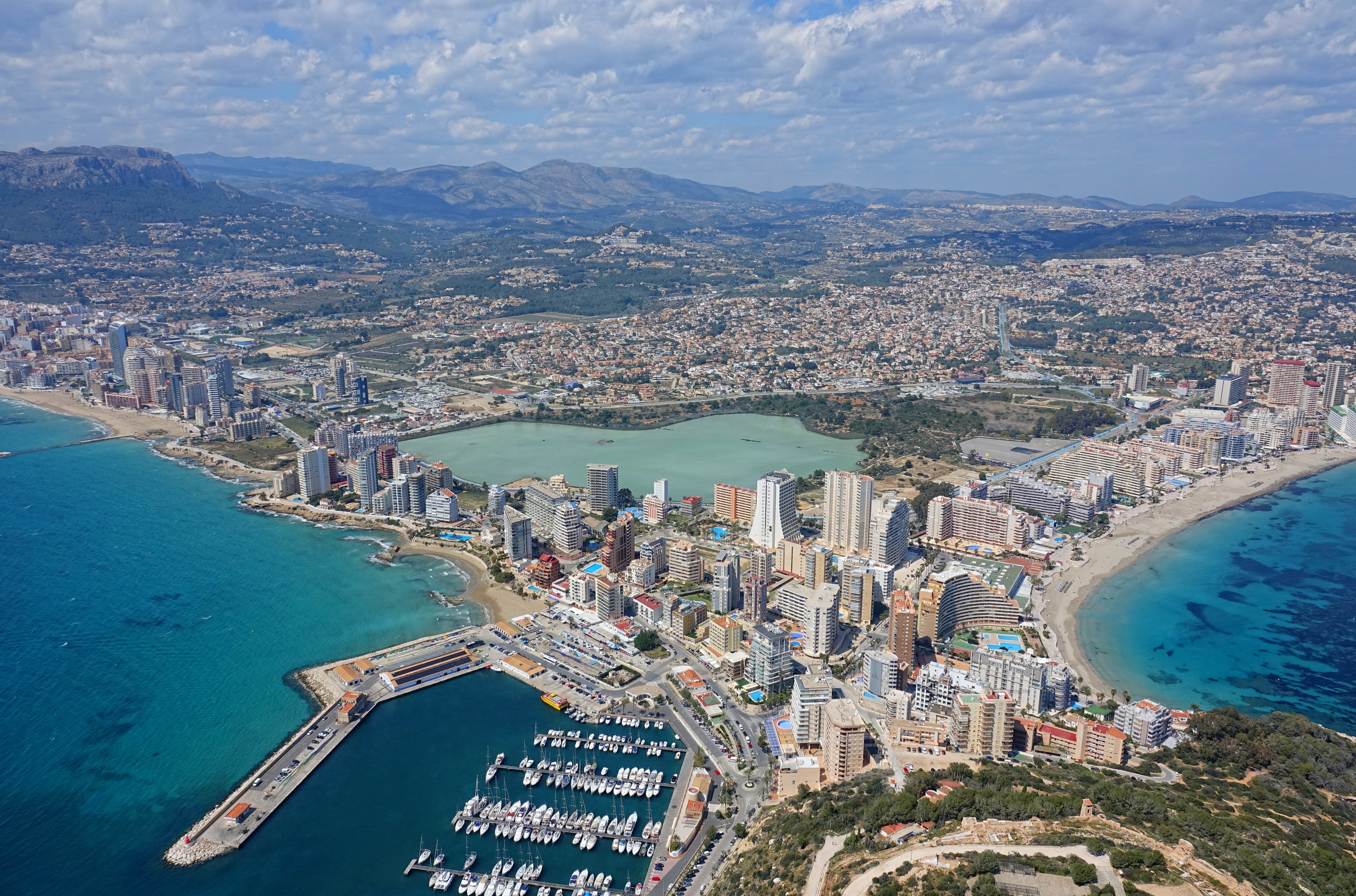
- Calpe seen from the peak of Penyal d'Ifac

- Coat of arms

- Location in the Province of Alicante Location in the Valencian Community Location in Spain
- Coordinates: 38°38′40″N 0°02′46″E
- Country: Spain
- Autonomous community: Valencian Community
- Province: Alicante / Alacant
- Comarca: Marina Alta

Government
  - Alcalde (Mayor) (Since 2019): Ana Sala (PP)

Area
  - Total: 23.51 km^{2} (9.08 sq mi)
- Elevation: 59 m (194 ft)

Population (2025-01-01)
  - Total: 27,616
  - Density: 1,175/km^{2} (3,042/sq mi)
- Demonyms: • calpí, -ina (Val.) • calpense (Sp.)
- Official language(s): Valencian; Spanish
- Linguistic area: Valencian
- Time zone: UTC+1 (CET)
  - Summer (DST): UTC+2 (CEST)
- Postal code: 03710
- Website: calp.es

Calpe, (Note: Pronunciation of Calpe: Spanish: [ˈkalpe]) in Spanish, officially in Valencian Calp, (Note: Pronunciation of Calp (official): Valencian: [ˈkalp]) is a coastal town and municipality located in the comarca of Marina Alta, in the province of Alicante, Valencian Community, Spain, by the Mediterranean Sea. It has an area of 23.5 km^{2} (9.1 sq mi) and a population density of 990 inhabitants per square kilometre (2,600/sq mi). The city lies at the foot of the Penyal d'Ifac Natural Park. In 2022 the population was 24,096 inhabitants.

The economy of Calpe is based mainly on tourism and fishing. Many Iberian, Roman and Arab archaeological sites exist in the town because of its strategic coastal location.

The Prime Meridian crosses Calpe.

== History ==
There are some remains that testify to the presence of inhabitants in the region of Calpe in prehistoric times; some remains date back to the Bronze Age. The first buildings were introduced by the Iberians, constructed on the higher grounds.

The Penyal d'Ifac (in Spanish Peñón de Ifach) was the natural lookout for the inhabitants that lived in the surrounding areas. Another lookout was the Morro de Toix Mountain, from which the Mascarat Ravine, an essential passage along the coast, could be controlled. The area gained in importance during the Romanization of the Iberian Peninsula. The township's proximity to the sea favoured marine trade and fish factories. Evidence is at the historical site Els Banys de la Reina (the Queen's Baths).

After the Arabs conquered Iberia, they built a castle overlooking the Mascarat Ravine. When the area was conquered by the Crown of Aragon, the Muslim administration was maintained: small townships set apart and protected by a castle or fortress. Therefore, the inhabitants of the region were dependent upon the Castle of Calpe.

In 1290, Calpe came under the control of the Aragonese admiral Roger of Lauria, who ordered that a village named Ifach to be built in the proximity of the Rock of Ifach. In 1359, the battle between the then monarch Peter IV of Aragon and Peter I of Castile in the War of the Two Peters caused the destruction of Ifac and a surge in the population of the Alqueria (from the Arabic Al-garya, meaning the "small town"). This rural building, generally constructed on mountainsides, is of an austere nature and simple design. It is made up of one or two floors at the most, with just the one gallery. In 1386, the administrative unit of the Castle of Calpe was divided into the towns currently known as Benissa, Teulada, Calpe, and Senija.

In 1637, concurrently with the raid on Ceriale and Borghetto, Algerian barbary pirates launched an incursion targeting Calpe. During this invasion, the Corsairs devastated the coastal areas of Valencia, leading to the enslavement of 315 individuals, mostly women and children. In the 17th century, there was an increase in the population, which gave rise to the consolidation of Calpe.

Towards the mid-18th century, several projects arose to build a new fortified wall around the township because by then, the increase in the population forced many inhabitants to live outside the protection of the existing walls. During the 19th century, the village developed towards the west. The basic axis of growth was along the route between Altea and Alicante.

During the second half of the 19th century, the fishing industry began to take off throughout the region. Buildings, such as the Fisherman's Cooperative, were constructed and functioned alongside several existing factories dating from the end of the 18th century. These buildings, however, were not a nucleus of population dedicated to fishing activities.

In 1918, the El Saladar salt flats were cleaned up, and the production of salt could once again take place. Thanks to the technical innovations of the times, bigger fishing vessels were constructed. The first small hotels arose in the area surrounding Els banys de la Reina and the Racó Beach, and catered to the emerging middle classes. The summer tourist trade increased substantially with the construction of the Ifach Parador in 1935.

Between 1945 and the end of the 1950s, many holiday villas and small hotels were built to accommodate the flourishing summer tourist trade. The hotel trade in the region is located almost exclusively on the coastal area. During the second half of the 1960s, as happened along the rest of the Costa Blanca, there was a tremendous boom in construction in Calpe because of political change and the emergence of tourism as a phenomenon of the masses. In the late 1960s and early 1970s, Calpe became the filming location for the films of Spanish Film director Jesus Franco.

== Main sights ==
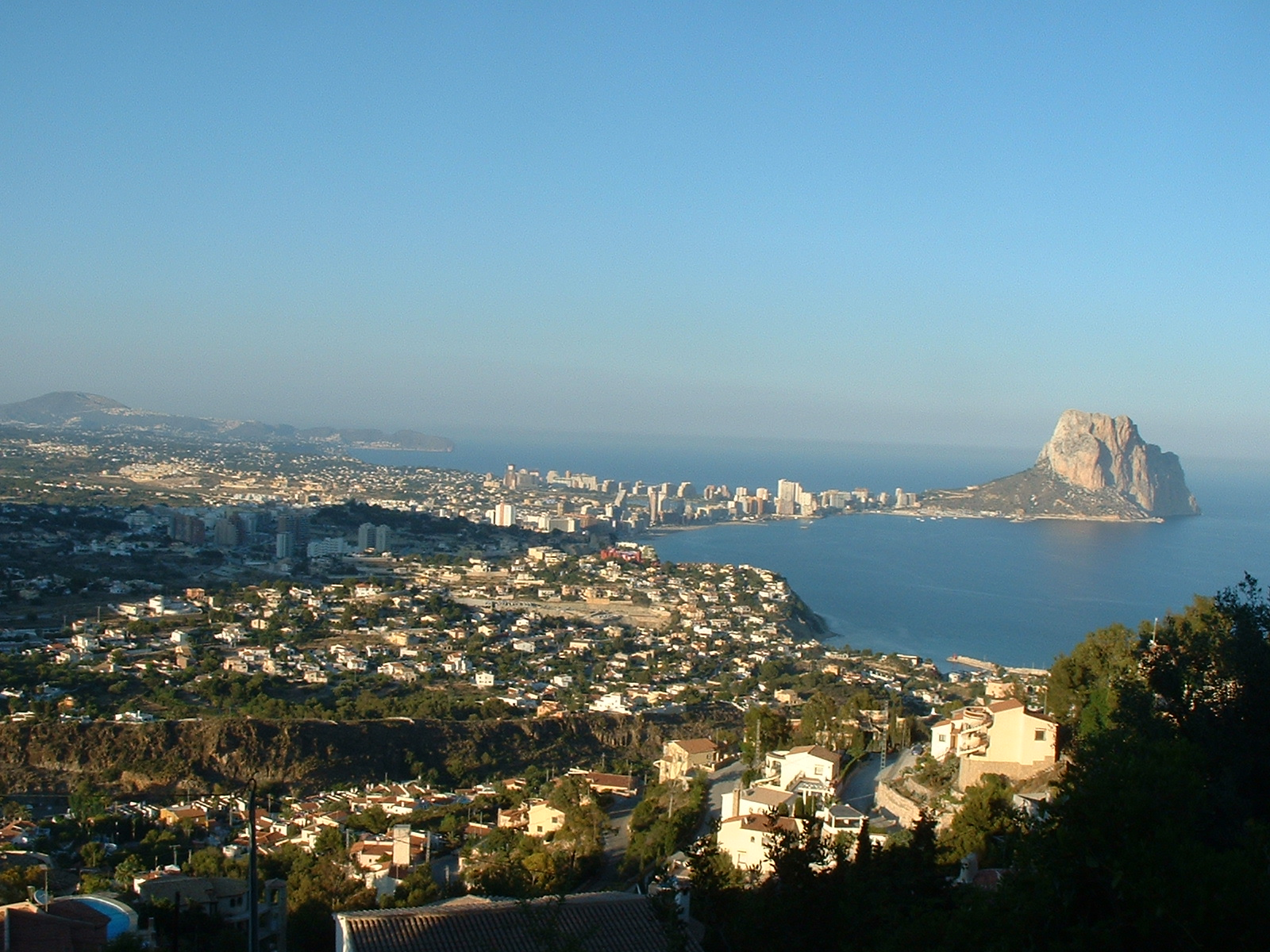
View of Calpe and the Penyal d'Ifac

Some of the most important monuments are the ruins of Els banyas de la reina (the queen's baths), the flooded salt flats, a bird sanctuary for migratory birds, its Gothic Catholic church and the 18th-century tower of La Peça.

The Penyal d'Ifac Natural Park is also a popular tourist destination.

== Twin towns ==
Calpe is twinned with:

- Oppenheim, Germany
- El Puerto de Santa María, Spain
