= Edward Margolies =

American literary critic (1925– 2017)

- Born: December 19, 1925; Boston, Massachusetts, U.S.
- Died: January 9, 2017 (aged 91); New York City, U.S.
- Occupations: Literary critic Biographer

Edward Margolies (December 19, 1925 – January 9, 2017) was an American literary critic and biographer.

== Early years ==
Margolies was raised in Boston, Massachusetts. His parents were Eastern European Jewish immigrants. He was the youngest of four children, having three older sisters. Margolies served in World War II, guarding German and Italian prisoners of war. After the war, he attended Brown University on the G.I. Bill graduating in 1950. In 1958, he married Claire Norman, and the couple have three children.

== Career ==
After graduating from Brown, Margolies attended New York University, obtaining his Ph.D; his 1964 dissertation was entitled A critical analysis of the works of Richard Wright. He became a professor of English and American Studies at College of Staten Island of the City University of New York. In 1977, he was a Fulbright Scholar at Radboud University Nijmegen in the Netherlands. He taught at the Sorbonne (University of Paris III: Sorbonne Nouvelle) in 1979.

Margolies has written a number of books exploring the work of African American writers in the United States. In 1968, the book Native Sons was published. Native Sons is the study of eight twentieth-century African-American writers: William Attaway, Chester Himes, William Demby, Richard Wright, James Baldwin, Ralph Ellison, Malcolm X and LeRoi Jones. Margolies' essays explore the work of these writers from the perspective of the African American experience. Kirkus Reviews described the book as "a godsend for students and teachers of American literature" and noted "Margolies leaves it to the reader to tie up the manifold themes which emerge, from self-hatred to negritude." A follow up to Native Sons was published in 1970, the Native Sons Reader. The book, edited by Margolies, is a collection of works by African American authors such as W.E.B. Du Bois, Ralph Ellison, William Demby, among others.

In 1969, The Art of Richard Wright was published. The book was the first book-length critical appraisal of the writer Richard Wright. Margolies explored how Wright's work dealt with certain themes: freedom, existential horror, and black nationalism. Margolies' work on Wright was described as "seminal" by Yoshinobu Hakutani in African American Review.

Margolies' later works include The Several Lives of Chester Himes, a biography of the black expatriate detective writer Chester Himes; Which Way Did He Go?, an examination of the private eye detective in the work of Dashiell Hammett, Raymond Chandler, Chester Himes, and Ross Macdonald; and New York and the Literary Imagination: The City in Twentieth Century Fiction and Drama, an exploration of how 20th-century writers have portrayed New York City.

== Bibliography ==
- — Native Sons: A Critical Study of Twentieth-Century Negro American Authors. Philadelphia: Lippincott (1968). ISBN 9780397005390.
- — The Art of Richard Wright. Carbondale: Southern Illinois University Press (1969). ISBN 9780809303458
- — A Native Sons Reader. Philadelphia: Lippincott (1970). ISBN 9780397006595
- — Ante-bellum Slave Narratives: Their place in American literary history. New York: Harper & Row (1975). ISBN 0061600040
- — and David Bakish. Afro-American Fiction, 1853-1976: A Guide to Information Sources. Farmington Hills: Gale Group (1979). ISBN 0810312077
- — Which Way Did He Go? New York: Holmes & Meier Pub (1981). ISBN 0841904367
- — New York and the Literary Imagination: The City in Twentieth Century Fiction and Drama. Jefferson: McFarland (2007). ISBN 0786430710
- — and Michel Fabre. The Several Lives of Chester Himes. Jackson: University Press of Mississippi (2008). ISBN 1934110965
