= John A. Williams =

American writer (1925–2015)

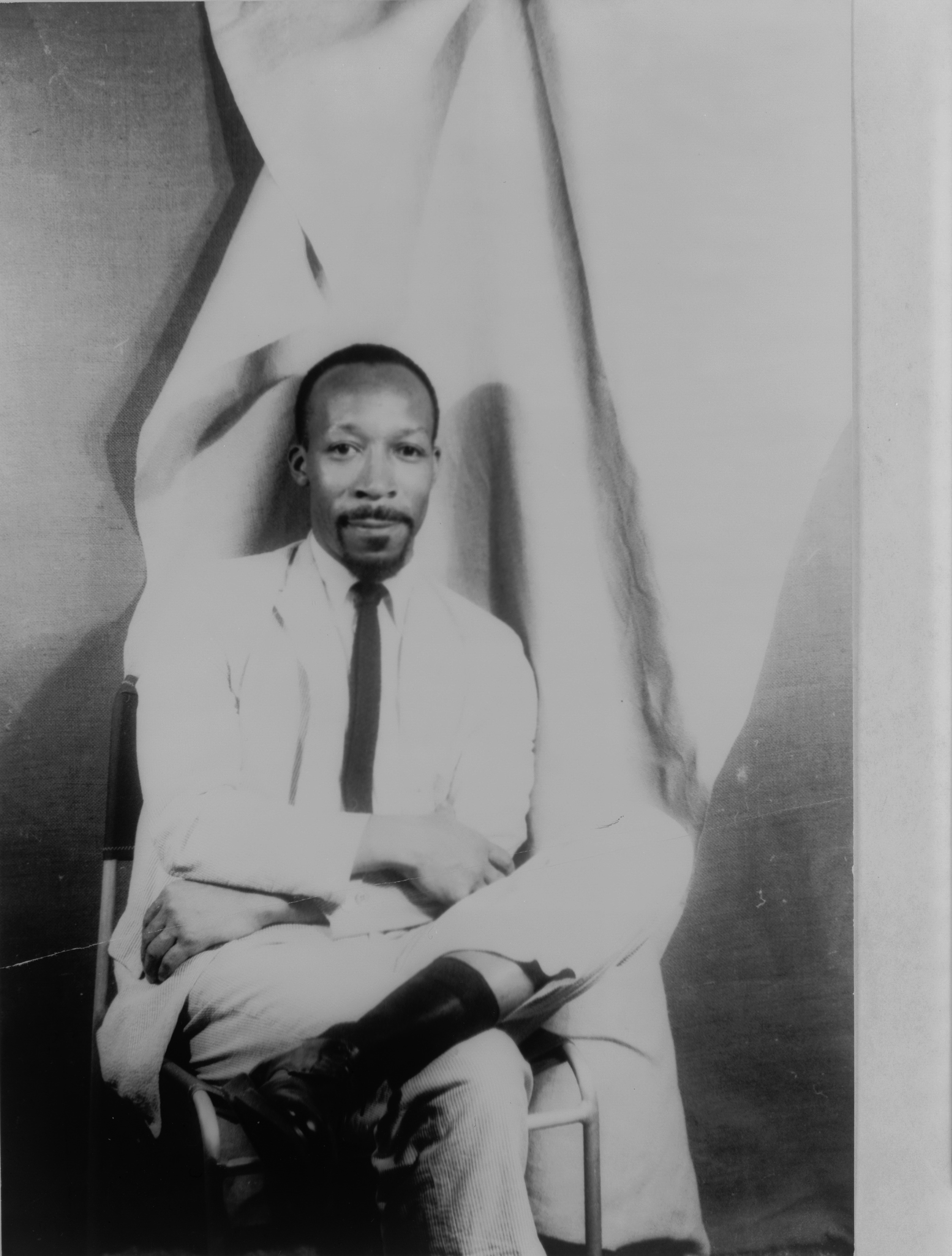
- Williams in 1962 (photo by Carl Van Vechten)
- Born: John Alfred Williams; December 5, 1925; Jackson, Mississippi, U.S.
- Died: July 3, 2015 (aged 89); Paramus, New Jersey, U.S.
- Education: Syracuse University
- Occupations: Novelist; poet; journalist; academic
- Spouse: Lori Isaac (m. 1965)
- Writing career
- Notable work: The Man Who Cried I Am (1967)
- Notable awards: American Book Award

John Alfred Williams (December 5, 1925 – July 3, 2015) was an American author, journalist, and academic. His novel The Man Who Cried I Am was a bestseller in 1967. Also a poet, he won an American Book Award for his 1998 collection Safari West.

== Life and career ==
Williams was born in Jackson, Mississippi, and his family moved to Syracuse, New York. After naval service in World War II, he graduated in 1950 from Syracuse University. He was a journalist for Ebony (his September 1963 Ebony article "Negro In Literature Today" has been singled out for particular praise), Jet, and Newsweek magazines.

His novels, which include The Angry Ones (1960) and The Man Who Cried I Am (1967), are mainly about the black experience in white America. The Man Who Cried I Am, a fictionalized account of the life and death of African-American writer Richard Wright, introduced the King Alfred Plan – a fictional CIA-led scheme supporting an international effort to eliminate people of African descent. This "plan" has since been cited as fact by some members of the Black community and conspiracy theorists. Sons of Darkness, Sons of Light: A Novel of Some Probability (1969) imagines a race war in the United States. The novel begins as a thriller with aspects of detective fiction and spy fiction, before transitioning to apocalyptic fiction at the point when the characters' revolt begins.

In the early 1980s, Williams and the composer and flautist Leslie Burrs, with the agreement of Mercer Ellington, began collaborating on the completion of Queenie Pie, an opera by Duke Ellington that had been left unfinished at Ellington's death. The project fell through, and the opera was eventually completed by other hands.

In 2003, Williams performed a spoken-word piece on Transform, an album by rock band Powerman 5000. At the time, his son Adam Williams was the band's guitarist.

== Personal life ==
Williams married Lori Isaac in 1965 and moved in 1975 from Manhattan to Teaneck, New Jersey, as it was a place that "would not be inhospitable to a mixed marriage".

Dear Chester, Dear John, a collection of personal letters between Williams and Chester Himes, who had met in 1961 and maintained a lifelong friendship, was published in 2008.

== Honorable recognitions ==
In 1970, Williams received the Syracuse University Centennial Medal for Outstanding Achievement, in 1983 his novel !Click Song won the American Book Award, and in 1998, his book of poetry Safari West also won the American Book Award. On October 16, 2011, he received a Lifetime Achievement award from the American Book Awards.

== Death ==
Williams died on July 3, 2015, in Paramus, New Jersey, aged 89. He had Alzheimer's disease.

== Legacy ==
Williams' personal papers, including correspondence and photographs, are held at Rare Books, Special Collections, and Preservation, River Campus Libraries at the University of Rochester. There is also a collection of Williams' papers at the Special Collections Research Center at Syracuse University.

== Selected bibliography ==
=== Novels ===
- The Angry Ones, Norton, 1960, 9780393314649; The Angry Ones: A Novel. Open Road Media. February 2, 2016. ISBN 978-1-5040-2591-1.
- Night Song, Farrar, Straus and Cudahy, 1961; Night Song: A Novel. Open Road Media. February 2, 2016. ISBN 978-1-5040-2572-0.
- Sissie, Farrar, Straus and Cudahy, 1963; Chatham Bookseller, 1975, ISBN 9780911860535
- The Man Who Cried I Am, Little, Brown, 1967; The Man Who Cried I Am: A Novel. Library of America. November 7, 2023. ISBN 978-1598537611.
- Sons of Darkness, Sons of Light, Little, Brown, 1969; Eyre & Spottiswoode, 1970, ISBN 9780413446206
- Captain Blackman, Coffee House Press, 1972, ISBN 9781566890960 Captain Blackman: A Novel. Open Road Media. February 2, 2016. ISBN 978-1-5040-3264-3.
- Mothersill and the Foxes, Doubleday, 1975, ISBN 9780385094542
- The Junior Bachelor Society, Doubleday, 1976, ISBN 9780385094559
- !Click Song, 1982 ISBN 9780395318416; !Click Song: A Novel. Open Road Media. February 2, 2016. ISBN 978-1-5040-3304-6.
- The Berhama Account, New Horizon Press Publishers, 1985, ISBN 9780882820095
- Jacob's Ladder, New York: Thunder's Mouth Press, 1987; 1989, ISBN 9780938410768
- Clifford's Blues, Coffee House Press, 1999, ISBN 9781566890809; Clifford's Blues: A Novel. Open Road Media. February 2, 2016. ISBN 978-1-5040-3305-3.

=== Non-fiction ===
- Africa: Her History, Lands and People: Told with Pictures. Rowman & Littlefield. 1962. ISBN 978-0-8154-0258-9.
- This Is My Country Too (New American Library, 1965)
- The King God Didn't Save: Reflections on the Life and Death of Martin Luther King, Jr. (1970)
- The Most Native of Sons: A Biography of Richard Wright (1970)
- Flashbacks: A Twenty-Year Diary of Article Writing (1973)
- If I Stop I'll Die: The Comedy and Tragedy of Richard Pryor (Thunder's Mouth Press, 1991)

=== Poetry ===
- Safari West: Poems (Hochelaga Press, 1998)

=== Letters ===
- Dear Chester, Dear John: Letters between Chester Himes and John A. Williams (compiled and edited with Lori Williams), Wayne State University Press, 2008, ISBN 9780814333556
