= The Real Cool Killers =

1959 novel by Chester Himes

- First English edition
- Author: Chester Himes
- Original title: Il pleut des coups durs
- Cover artist: Terrance Cummings
- Language: English
- Series: Harlem Detective
- Genre: (Hardboiled Crime Fiction)
- Publisher: Avon
- Publication date: 1959
- Publication place: United States
- Media type: Print Paperback
- Pages: 159 pp
- OCLC: 88040121
- Dewey Decimal: 813/.54
- LC Class: PS3515.I713 R44 1988
- Preceded by: A Rage in Harlem
- Followed by: The Crazy Kill

The Real Cool Killers is a hardboiled crime fiction novel written by Chester Himes. Published in 1959, it is the second book in the Grave Digger Jones & Coffin Ed Johnson Mysteries. The protagonists of the novel, Grave Digger Jones and Coffin Ed, are a pair of black detectives who patrol the dangerous slums of Harlem. The book was originally published in French under the title Il pleut des coups durs (English: It's Raining Hard).

== Plot ==
Ulysses Galen, a white man slumming in Harlem, is attacked in a bar by a black man with a knife; fleeing outside, he attracts the attention of a man named Pickens, who is high on marijuana. Pickens proceeds to run after Galen while shooting. Detectives Grave Digger Jones and Coffin Ed Johnson arrive to find Galen shot to death in the street, and they arrest Pickens. However, a Harlem street gang calling themselves the Real Cool Moslems (really teenagers in fake beards) cause a distraction and spirit Pickens away. The detectives realize that the gun they confiscated from Pickens is a movie prop that only shoots blanks; they must now recover Pickens and also find out who really shot Galen, and why.

== Reception ==
In a brief review of The Real Cool Killers, The New York Times described crime novels as "guilty pleasures for the guilty minded". In another brief review, Berkeley scientist John McDonald commented on the book's racial tension, praising the book's "dark wit".

== Literary criticism ==
The Real Cool Killers has been subject of literary criticism, most notably for its depiction of African-American characters Grave Digger Jones and Coffin Ed Johnson. Digger especially is seen vocalizing his feelings over the murders and the indifference from the authorities. In her book At Home in Diaspora: Black International Writing, Wendy Walters describes the book's two detectives as "viable folk heroes for the urban community". Megan Abbott analyzed the book in The Street Was Mine, noting the depiction of Galen and how it differed from other depictions of white men in books such as Farewell, My Lovely, and how Himes "moves black male characters from representations peripheral and stereotypical (as icons of degeneration or service industry employees) to the center". In "Born in a Mighty Bad Land" Jerry H Bryant wrote "There is ... a kind of clinical as well as cultural element in Himes's treatment of the violent man in the Harlem of the fifties and sixties".
