= The Bronzeman =

20th century defunct magazine in Chicago Illinois, USA

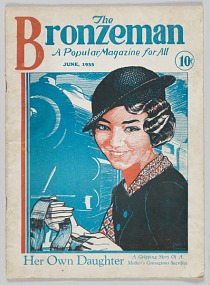
- Bronzeman Magazine, Volume 3, Issue 7, cover design by Charles C. Dawson
- Frequency: Monthly
- Format: Print
- Publisher: Fireside Publications, Inc.
- First issue: 1929
- Final issue: 1933
- Country: United States
- Based in: Chicago
- Language: English

The Bronzeman was a magazine published in Chicago, Illinois, from 1929 to 1933. It was founded by investor Robert Cole, president of the Chicago Metropolitan Mutual Assurance Company, and edited by Caswell W. Crews. The magazine featured original fiction and poetry, alongside a broad range of lifestyle and entertainment articles targeted at an African American audience. The tagline of the magazine was "A popular magazine for all." The Bronzeman also featured covers designs by African American artists including Charles C. Dawson and fiction from writers including Chester Himes and Anita Scott Coleman.
