= Costa Blanca =

Coastal area in Alicante, Spain

Costa Blanca in Spain

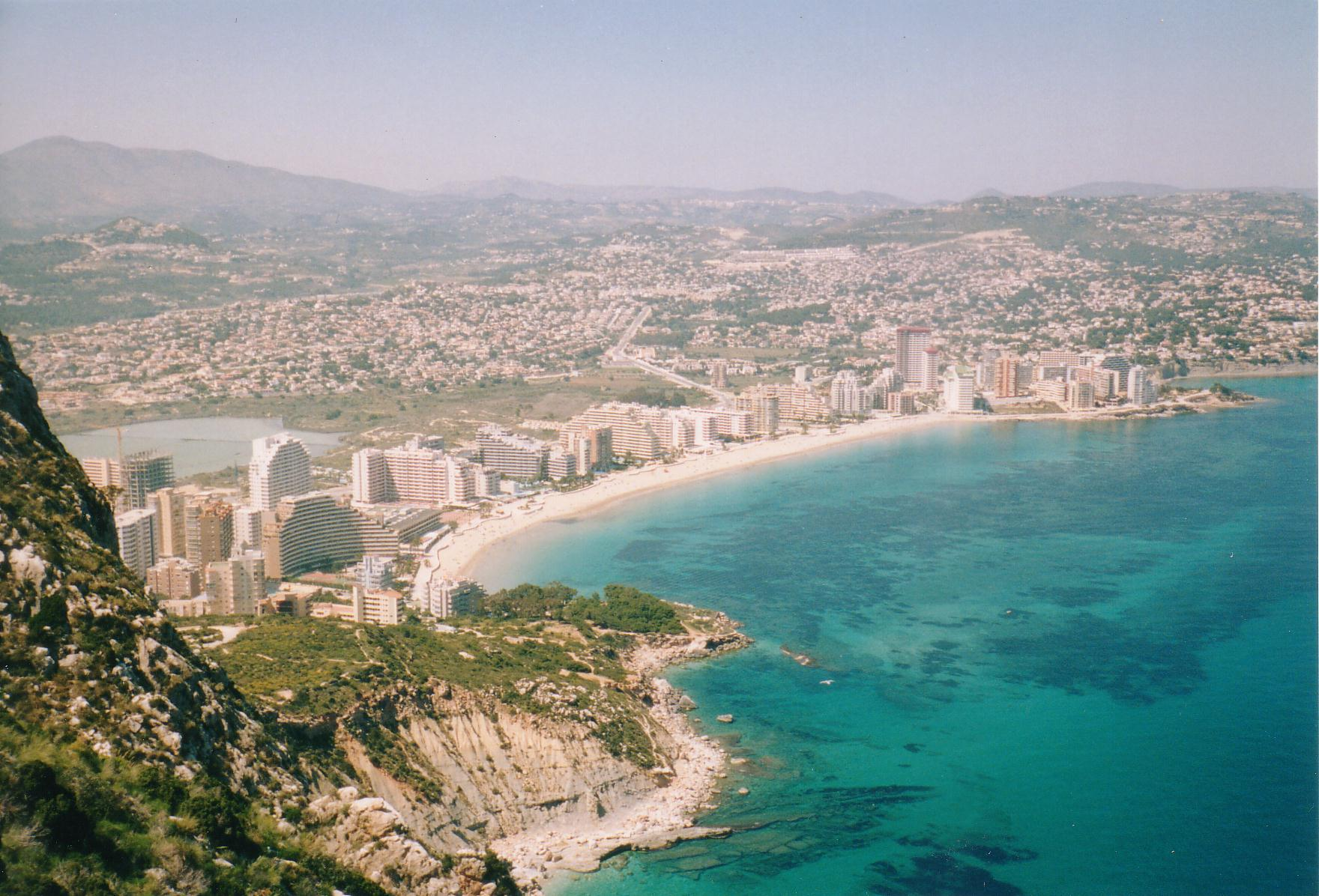
Calpe on the Costa Blanca

The Costa Blanca (Valencian: [ˈkɔsta ˈβlaŋka], also [ˈkɔstɔ ˈβlaŋka]; Spanish: [ˈkosta ˈβlaŋka], literally meaning "White Coast") is over 200 kilometres (120 mi) of Mediterranean coastline in the Alicante province of the Valencian Community, on the southeastern coast of Spain. It extends from the town of Dénia in the north, beyond which lies the Costa de Valencia, to Pilar de la Horadada in the south, beyond which lies the Costa Cálida.

The name Costa Blanca was coined in the 1950s as a way to promote tourism. The region has a well-developed tourism industry and is a popular destination for British and German tourists.

The localities along the Costa Blanca are Alicante (Alacant / Alicante), Altea, Benidorm, Benissa, Calpe (Calp), Dénia, Elche (Elx / Elche), El Campello, Finestrat, Guardamar del Segura, L'Alfàs del Pi, Orihuela Costa, Pilar de la Horadada, Santa Pola, Teulada–Moraira, Torrevieja, Villajoyosa (la Vila Joiosa / Villajoyosa) and Xàbia (Xàbia / Jávea). Benidorm and Alicante are the major tourist centres.

== History ==
The Iberians are the oldest people known to have lived in what is now Alicante province. Among several Iberian archaeologic sites, La Serreta (near Alcoy) is noteworthy as the location of the longest inscriptions ever found in the (still undeciphered) Iberian language.

During the same period, the Phoenicians (in Guardamar) and Greeks (along the coast north of Alicante city) created coastal colonies and interacted with the Iberians. The Lady of Elche is a famous archeological find from this period.

After a brief Carthaginian period, the Romans took over the area. Several cities thrived along the Via Augusta, which connected this part of Iberia to the rest of the Roman empire. One of those cities, Ilici Augusta (now Elche) even reached the status of colonia.

Following two centuries of rule by the Visigoths, the area was captured by Islamic armies and became a part of Al Andalus. Beginning in the 13th century, kings like Ferdinand III of Castile, James I of Aragon, Alfonso X of Castile, and James II of Aragon slowly reconquered the cities in the area.

What is now Alicante province was initially split between the Crown of Castile and the Crown of Aragon by means of the Treaty of Almizra. Later, the whole territory became under the control of the Kingdom of Valencia, which was one of the domains of the Crown of Aragon.

== Politics ==
In 2023 Alicante province had 12 deputies in the Spanish Parliament and 35 deputies in the Corts Valencianes, the regional parliament of the Valencian Community.

== Climbing ==
Costa Blanca is a popular climbing location due to its limestone crags and Mediterranean weather conditions.
