= The Man Who Cried I Am =

1967 novel by John A. Williams

- Author: John A. Williams
- Language: English
- Publisher: Little, Brown and Company
- Publication date: 1967; 59 years ago
- Publication place: United States
- Pages: 403
- Preceded by: This Is My Country Too
- Followed by: Sons of Darkness, Sons of Light

The Man Who Cried I Am, first published in 1967 by Little, Brown and Company, is the fourth novel by the American author John A. Williams. The novel tells the story of Max Reddick, a black novelist and journalist, who looks back on his private and professional life and learns of a secret and genocidal plan made by the U.S. government.

Williams dedicated the book to his wife Lorrain Isaac.

== Plot summary ==
In May 1964, Max Reddick, a black American journalist and novelist, sees his Dutch wife Margrit Westoever back in Amsterdam. Margrit returned to the Netherlands the year before to escape the tensions in their marriage. Max knows he has cancer and has quit his job. He has just returned from Paris where he attended the funeral of his friend, the famous black writer Harry Ames. Due to his critical views of America, Harry had been placed under surveillance by the security services. Accidentally Max sees that Alfonse Edwards, a black American civil servant he knows from the time when he was a correspondent in Nigeria, is also in Amsterdam.

Max wonders what Edwards is doing in the Netherlands. He was also present at Harry's funeral and said that Harry had suddenly died on the street in his company. Max receives a call from Michelle Bouilloux, a French woman with whom Harry had an extramarital affair, who says she is coming to the Netherlands for something important. She wants to see Max in Leiden the next day. Max and Margrit visit Roger Wilkinson, a black American writer who lives in Amsterdam. Max asks Roger if he knows what Edwards is doing in town, but Roger says he doesn't know.

The next day, Max travels to Leiden and remembers the time when his first book came out and he got to know Harry and how he had shaped his view of literature. Max reflects on the varying success of his novels and how that affected his relationship with Harry, the secret affair he had with Harry's wife Charlotte and their departure to Paris to escape the racism and hypocrisy in America. Max also thinks back to the Second World War, when he fought in Italy, and the difficulty he had after the war in finding work as a black journalist. His time as a speechwriter in the White House had ended in disappointment. He had subsequently been a correspondent in Africa and married Margrit, but rising race tensions in America affected their relationship, causing Margrit to return to the Netherlands.

In Leiden, Michelle Bouilloux hands Max a briefcase with documents from Harry. Max reads about a secret organization of Western governments to thwart the development of African countries as much as possible. It turns out that the American government developed a secret plan called the King Alfred Plan. It implies that the black minority could be interned and exterminated. A Nigerian politician who knew Harry had accidentally discovered the existence of the plan and, as a precaution, had passed on the information to him. The politician was later found dead.

Max realizes that Harry has been killed by Alfonse Edwards and that he himself is also in danger. Max calls the well-known black Muslim leader Minister Q and passes on the information about the King Alfred Plan so that Minister Q can initiate an uprising. The telephone conversation is tapped by the authorities who decide to get rid of Minister Q. On the way back to Amsterdam, Max is attacked by Alfonse Edwards and Roger Wilkinson and dies.

== Characters ==
- Max Reddick: a black American journalist and novelist in his late forties. He has worked at both a black and a white newspaper and has been a correspondent in Africa for Pace, a liberal magazine.
- Margrit Westoever: Max Reddick's Dutch wife. She is fourteen years younger than Max and works at an art gallery. They get to know each other when Max visits Amsterdam for the first time.
- Harry Ames: a black novelist and friend of Max. He is older than Max and is a great example for him and other young black writers. Harry is a former communist who believes in the common interest of black people in America and around the world.
- Charlotte Ames: Harry's wife. As a white woman, she has given up a lot by marrying Harry and this is causing tensions in their marriage. Harry also has extramarital relationships. Charlotte herself has a secret affair with Max for a while.
- Michelle Bouilloux: A French woman with whom Harry has an extramarital relationship.
- Roger Wilkinson: a black American writer. He has great literary ambitions, but has failed as a novelist. He leads a rather obscure existence as a journalist in Europe.
- Alfonse Edwards: a black American civil servant. He initially worked for the American embassy in Lagos and later turns up in Amsterdam.
- Theodore Dallas: a politician from a black background but who looks almost white and is married to a white woman. His career takes him to Washington and later to the United Nations.
- Lillian Patch: a black schoolteacher whom Max wants to marry. She finds his existence as a journalist and novelist financially precarious. When she becomes pregnant, she has an abortion and dies after the operation. Max never fully comes to terms with her death.
- Bernard Zutkin: a Jewish critic with a long literary career. At Zutkin's home, Max and Harry Ames meet for the first time. Zutkin is keenly aware of the interests that black and Jewish Americans historically share.
- Kermit Shea: a white editor at Pace and friend of Max.
- Julian Berg: a Jewish editor of the liberal newspaper New York Century. Max writes for the Century before joining Pace.
- Granville Bryant: An influential white gay writer. Thanks to Bryant, Max gains a foothold at the Century.
- Marion Dawes: a young black novelist from the entourage of Granville Bryant. Dawes writes critically about Harry Ames, and he leaves no doubt that he wants to take Harry's place as the most important black American writer.
- Jaja Enzkwu: a Nigerian politician and friend of Harry.
- Regina Galbraith: a woman of German-Jewish descent who, as a child, was the only member of her family to escape the Holocaust. She is married and struggles with mental health issues and has an affair with Max.
- Paul Durrell: a black pastor and well-known leader of the civil rights movement. He makes a reassuring impression on the establishment because he maintains the nostalgic white image of black America, which Max sees as a danger to the movement.
- Minister Q: a well-known black Muslim leader who believes that violence against blacks should be met with violence. Max is sympathetic to him and is amused by the hostility that Minister Q faces from the white media.

== Background ==
It has been suggested that The Man Who Cried I Am is a roman à clef. John A. Williams admitted that he based certain characters in the novel on real people. He was thinking of Chester Himes in the character of Max Reddick. Harry Ames was modeled on Richard Wright. James Baldwin was fictionalized as Marion Dawes. Minister Q was certainly Malcolm X. Similarities have been noticed between Roger Wilkinson and William Gardner Smith and between Alfonse Edwards and Richard Gibson. The character of Granville Bryant was inspired by Carl Van Vechten. Paul Durrell was based on Martin Luther King.

== King Alfred Plan ==
Williams presents the King Alfred Plan as a replica of a document that exists outside the fictional world of the novel, and it bears both the bureaucratic composition and the flatness of tone unique to committee writing.

== Reception ==
When The Man Who Cried I Am was first published, in 1967, the New York Times called it "a compelling novel, gracefully written, angry but acute, committed but controlled, obviously timely, but deserving of attention for far more than that." When it was republished in 2024, by Fitzcarraldo Editions in the United Kingdom and by the Library of America in the United States, it was described by the Times Literary Supplement as "exhausting and provocative... a flawed masterpiece," and in Bookforum, the critic Gene Seymour hailed the novel's "compelling narrative voice that comes across like a long, strong, sometimes strident jazz ballad, alternating street-level humor with brokenhearted stoicism," concluding that the book was "not the Great American Novel, but a Great American Novel."

== Translations ==
- Dutch: (1969). Naar Jamestown en terug. Translated by Louis Ferron. Utrecht/Antwerp: A.W. Bruna & Zoon. ISBN 90-229-7057-4
- French: (1993). L'homme qui criait je suis. Translated by Hélène Devaux-Minié. Paris: Quai Voltaire. ISBN 2-87653-197-6
- Italian: (2025). L'uomo che gridò io sono. Translated by Massimo Ferraris. Elliot, Roma. ISBN 978-88-9276-342-5

== Sources ==
- Emre, Merve (2017). Paraliterary. The Making of Bad Readers in Postwar America. Chicago, Illinois: The University of Chicago Press. ISBN 978-0-226-47397-0.
- Maxwell, William J. (2015). F.B. Eyes. How J. Edgar Hoover's Ghostreaders Framed African American Literature. Princeton, New Jersey: Princeton University Press. ISBN 978-0-691-13020-0.
- Tucker, Jeffrey Allen (2018). Conversations with John A. Williams. Jackson, Mississippi: University Press of Mississippi. ISBN 978-1-4968-1817-1.
- Williams, John A. (2023). The Man Who Cried I Am. Foreword by Ishmael Reed. Introduction by Merve Emre. New York: Library of America. ISBN 978-1-59853-761-1.
