= If He Hollers Let Him Go =

1945 novel by Chester Himes

- First edition
- Author: Chester Himes
- Language: English
- Genre: Literary fiction
- Publisher: Doubleday Doran
- Publication date: 1945
- Publication place: United States
- Media type: Print
- Pages: 203
- OCLC: 51102812
- Dewey Decimal: 813/.54 21
- LC Class: PS3515.I713 I3 2002

If He Hollers Let Him Go is the first novel by American writer Chester Himes, published in 1945, about an African-American shipyard worker in Los Angeles during World War II. It earned him critical acclaim and was considered a "protest novel", in the tradition of Richard Wright.

The book was adapted as a 1968 film, starring Raymond St. Jacques, Dana Wynter, Kevin McCarthy, Barbara McNair, and Arthur O'Connell. The screenplay differed markedly from the novel.

== Plot and characters ==
The story spans four days in the life of Robert "Bob" Jones, a newcomer to Los Angeles from Ohio. With some college education, he works as a crew leader in a naval shipyard. In this period, Black workers are gaining opportunities in the defense industry as a result of executive orders of President Franklin D. Roosevelt during World War II.

However, Jones cannot escape the pressures of racism. He believes he was promoted as a supervisor only to gain the cooperation of Black workers in the war effort. He is forced to deal with anti-communist paranoia, resentment from whites on the floor working at the same jobs as "colored boys", and the baiting of Black workers by some white females.

His fears invade his dreams, aspirations, and passions. His dream of making something of himself in California is jeopardized as he reacts to the actions of the white people around him. He struggles to contain his urges to fight, kill, and rape as ways to overcome his resentment of white power arrayed against him.

The main characters are the protagonist, Bob Jones, and two women: Madge Perkins, who is white; and Alice Harrison, his higher-class African-American girlfriend. Bob struggles for place in a white-dominated world and is filled with violent thoughts against white people, but does not act on them.

In what is described as a "sexually charged novel", Madge makes a racial slur toward Bob. His calling her a "bitch" results in his demotion. He considers raping her as a way to get back at white America, seeing her as a symbol of "whiteness", but when she expresses sexual attraction to him, he rejects her. Alice tells Bob it is no use getting angry about the inequality that Black people must live with, and he has to learn to deal with it.

== Themes ==
Themes addressed in the novel include racism suffered by Black people, color differentiation among African Americans (Alice's light skin is associated with her higher class), employment discrimination against Black people, and race-based class divisions. Communism is featured generously, as the Communist unionists ("agitators") are the only ones who talk about the issue of race in any way with which the protagonist agrees. There is some reference to jazz.

The book’s title plays on the third line of a popular children’s rhyme, which follows the second line historically included a racial epithet, “catch a n***** by the toe”(in the US and other English-speaking countries like Australia). Mid-20th century variants in the US replaced the epithet with “tiger.”

The novel is referred to in Frantz Fanon's book, Black Skin White Masks (1952), first published in French, in the chapter titled "The Fact of Blackness".

== Reception ==
Critics praised this first novel by Himes, classifying it in the "protest novel" tradition established by Richard Wright.
