= King Alfred Plan =

Conspiracy theory

The "King Alfred Plan" is a fictional CIA-led scheme supporting an international effort to eliminate people of African descent, invented by author John A. Williams in his novel The Man Who Cried I Am. Williams described it as a government plan to deal with the threat of a black uprising in the United States by cordoning off black people into concentration camps in the event of a major racial incident.

== 1967 novel ==
The King Alfred Plan first appeared in Williams' 1967 novel, The Man Who Cried I Am, an account of the life and death of Richard Wright. In the afterword to later editions, Williams compares the King Alfred Plan to intelligence programs devised by J. Edgar Hoover in the 1960s to monitor the movements of black militants.

It also bears similarities to rumors in the early 1950s surrounding the McCarran Act, an anti-Communist law, in which political subversives were to be rounded up and placed in concentrations camps during a national emergency. When his novel was first published, Williams photocopied portions of the book detailing the King Alfred Plan and left copies in subway car seats around Manhattan.

=== Cultural dissemination ===
As a result, word of the King Alfred Plan spread throughout the black community. The truth of its existence was often assumed to be unchallenged. Performer and musician Gil Scott-Heron created the song The King Alfred Plan, included on his 1972 album Free Will, that takes the Plan at face value. Jim Jones, head of the 'apostolic socialist' People's Temple, discussed the Plan at length in numerous recordings of his rant-style speeches both in the United States and in the Jonestown community in Guyana, treating it as completely genuine.

In an interview with Jet, Williams explained that he developed the idea when thinking about the question "What would any administration do in a situation when a large segment of the population was discontented and tearing down the neighborhood . . . threatening the order and the established regime?"
