= Moraira =

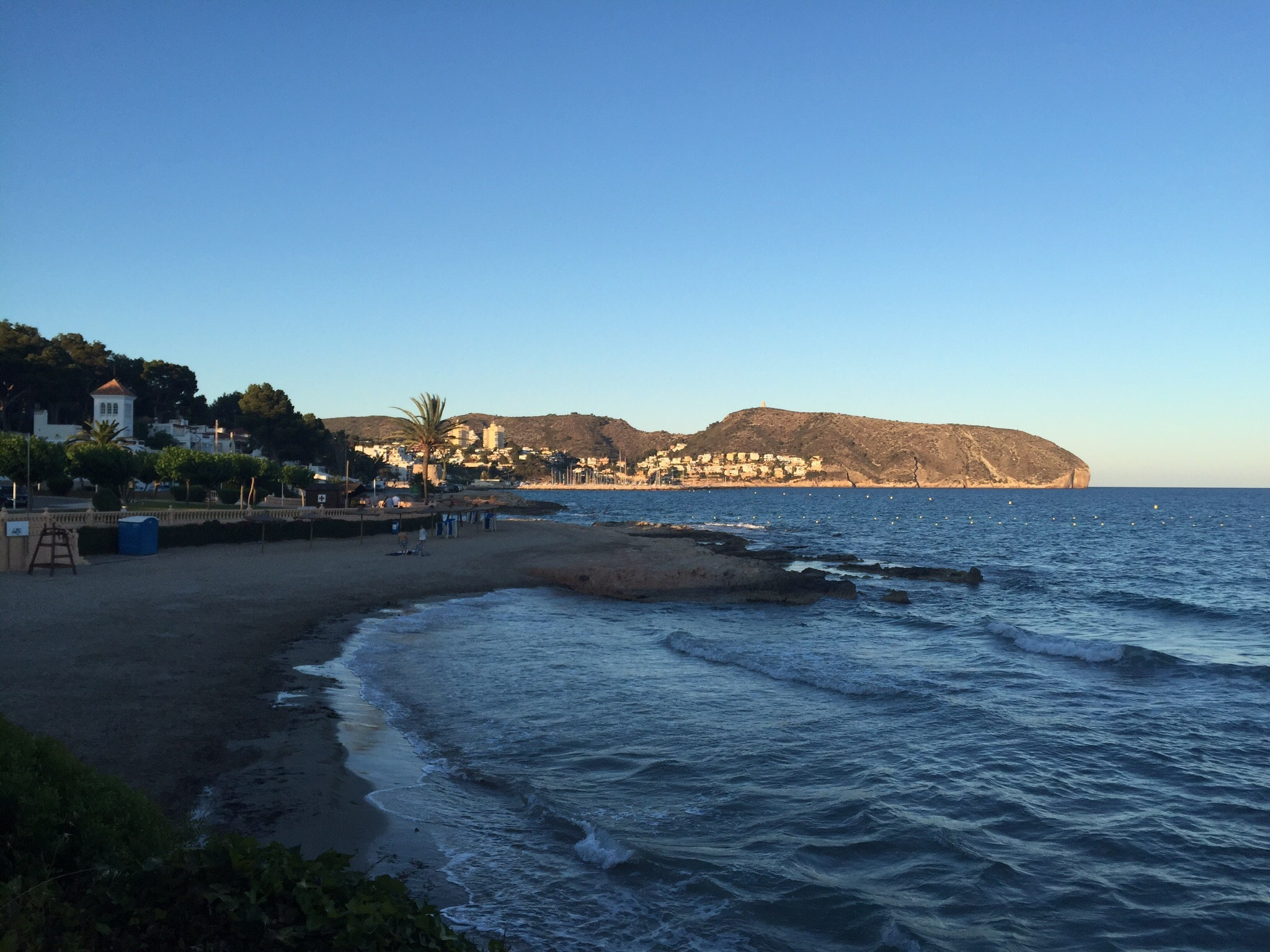
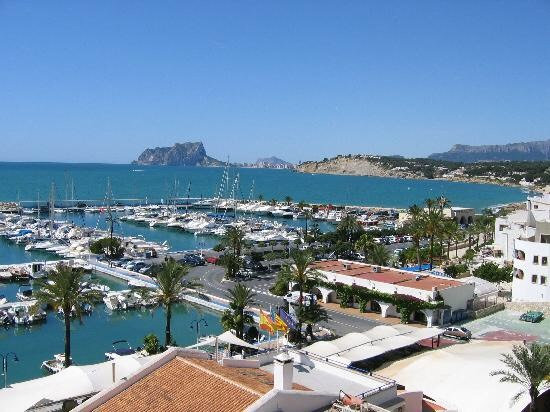
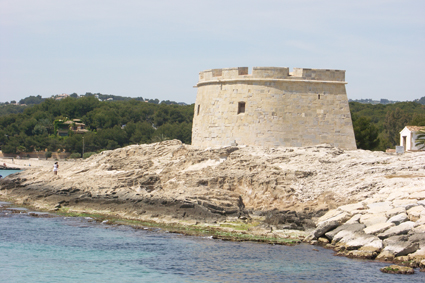
- Top left: Moraira and Cap d'Or from Cap Blanc; Top right: Marina with Calpe Rock in the distance; Bottom: Castillo de Moraira

- Location in the Province of Alicante Location in the Valencian Community Location in Spain
- Coordinates: 38.688°N 0.1345°E
- Country: Spain
- Autonomous community: Valencian Community
- Province: Alicante
- Comarca: Marina Alta
- Municipality: Teulada

Government
  - Mayor of Teulada-Moraira: Carlos Linares Banon (People's Party)

Population
  - Total: 10,000 (approx)
- Time zone: UTC+1 (CET)
  - Summer (DST): UTC+2 (CEST)
- Website: www.teuladamoraira.com.es

Moraira (Valencian: [moˈɾajɾa]) is a small upmarket Spanish coastal town, part of Teulada (also known as Teulada-Moraira) municipality, in the Marina Alta comarca, 80 km north of Alicante and 100 km south of Valencia.

The town is located adjacent to the neighbouring village of El Portet and both communities form a tourist resort on the Costa Blanca strip, with 8 km of coastline backed by mountains and vineyards.

== History ==
The area around Moraira has been inhabited since prehistory. Objects found in the Cova de la Cendra archaeological site on Cap d'Or - adjacent to the town - revealed that human habitation can be traced back to the Upper Paleolithic era. Pots linked to the Iberians have also been found on Cal d'Or, suggesting that they later inhabited the area during the Bronze Age.

Following the Umayyad conquest of Hispania, the area was eventually settled by Moors and influence of that culture can still be seen today in the region's architecture and municipal layouts. Many of the names in the Teulada-Moraira area derive from the Moor settlement - such as Alcassar, Benimeit, Benimarco, Moravit, Pouet del Morro and Tabaira. Indeed, local legend suggests that Moraira was named after the Moorish princess Ira, la Mora.

During the Reconquista, the Moors were expelled by Jaime I de Aragón and became part of the Kingdom of Aragon between 1270 and 1280 - this is still celebrated today during the annual Moros y cristianos festival. In the years that followed, the Moors were replaced by Christian settlers from Catalonia and Aragon, who introduced the Valencian language to the area. In 1386 Teulada was founded five kilometers from the coast by the Lords of Lluria, Serria and Grandia and became a municipality in its own right.

During the 16th century, Barbary pirates raided the coast and Teulada was fortified with a lookout tower on the Cap d'Or by Felipe II. This was part of a planned chain of fortifications which later included the Castillo de Moraira - completed in 1742 - located in what is now the centre of the town. The Castillo was armed with four bronze cannons and was badly damaged by the British fleet on 20 July 1801 during the French Revolutionary Wars although it has since been restored.

By the end of the 18th century, Teulada had developed into a farming village, with crops exported by sea from natural ports. Locals eventually turned to fishing as an additional source of income and small buildings by the coast were built on the site of present-day Moraira to store tackle and equipment. These buildings were eventually expanded to become homes for the fishermen and Moraira developed into a small fishing village.

Moraira's economy transformed dramatically in the 1970s and 1980s due to international tourism. The town expanded dramatically to accommodate new holiday homes and infrastructure for tourists. Today, the permanent population of Moraira is around 10,000, although this rises to 36,000 in summer. There is a high proportion of expatriates living in the town permanently, and the area is very popular with affluent retirees, especially British and Dutch. The majority of visitors to Moraira are Spanish, British, German, Dutch, and French.

== Geography and climate ==
The Moraira valley is the convergent point of several mountain streams, which flow across the beach even during the driest August weather. Over time, these streams have deposited their rich alluvial soil on the valley bottom. To the north, the town is bordered by the Cap d'Or hillside.

Across the Moraira-Teulada area, more than 2,000 hectares are under cultivation and 1,000 hectares are used for vineyards. The use of the hillside terraces for agriculture during the Moors era is still in evidence today.

=== Climate ===
Moraira boasts a very stable Mediterranean climate with approximately 300 sunny days a year. The summers are hot and the winters mild, with the surrounding foothills providing protection from harsh weather during the winter while creating a natural vortex for cooling sea breezes in the summer. The sea temperature during the summer months is up to 25 degrees and it hardly rains during the months July–August.

Climate data for Moraira
Month	Jan	Feb	Mar	Apr	May	Jun	Jul	Aug	Sep	Oct	Nov	Dec	Year
Mean daily maximum °C (°F)	16.0 (60.8)	16.0 (60.8)	18.0 (64.4)	20.0 (68.0)	23.0 (73.4)	26.0 (78.8)	29.0 (84.2)	30.0 (86.0)	28.0 (82.4)	23.0 (73.4)	19.0 (66.2)	16.0 (60.8)	22.0 (71.6)
Mean daily minimum °C (°F)	6.0 (42.8)	7.0 (44.6)	8.0 (46.4)	10.0 (50.0)	13.0 (55.4)	17.0 (62.6)	20.0 (68.0)	20.0 (68.0)	18.0 (64.4)	14.0 (57.2)	10.0 (50.0)	7.0 (44.6)	12.5 (54.5)
Average rainfall mm (inches)	32.0 (1.26)	32.0 (1.26)	35.0 (1.38)	37.0 (1.46)	31.0 (1.22)	21.0 (0.83)	9.0 (0.35)	20.0 (0.79)	44.0 (1.73)	81.0 (3.19)	53.0 (2.09)	47.0 (1.85)	442 (17.41)
Average rainy days	13.0	11.0	11.0	10.0	9.0	6.0	3.0	4.0	6.0	10.0	10.0	12.0	105
Mean daily sunshine hours	6.0	6.0	7.0	8.0	9.0	10.0	11.0	9.0	8.0	7.0	6.0	5.0	7.7
Percentage possible sunshine	60	55	58	62	64	67	73	64	67	64	60	50	62
Source: Weather Atlas

Climate data for Moraira
Month	Jan	Feb	Mar	Apr	May	Jun	Jul	Aug	Sep	Oct	Nov	Dec	Year
Average sea temperature °C (°F)	14.4 (57.9)	14.0 (57.2)	14.3 (57.7)	16.3 (61.3)	19.0 (66.2)	22.6 (72.7)	25.2 (77.4)	26.2 (79.2)	25.0 (77.0)	22.5 (72.5)	19.4 (66.9)	16.4 (61.5)	19.6 (67.3)
Mean daily daylight hours	10.0	11.0	12.0	13.0	14.0	15.0	15.0	14.0	12.0	11.0	10.0	10.0	12.3
Average Ultraviolet index	2	3	5	6	8	9	9	8	6	4	3	2	5.4
Source: Weather Atlas

== Politics ==
At a national level, Moraira elects representatives to the Congress of Deputies as part of the Alicante constituency. The constituency is typically a stronghold of the People's Party but the April 2019 general election take the most seats for the first time since 1989. 2019 saw the region elected 12 deputies - 4 for the PSOE, 3 for the People's Party, 2 for Podemos, 2 for the Citizen's Party and 1 for Vox.

Regionally, Moraira also elects members to the unicameral Corts Valencianes as part of Alicante Province. The 2019 regional elections, saw the PSOV-PSOE win the most seats in the province for the first time since 1991.

=== Municipal governance ===
As part of the Teulada-Moraira municipality, Moraira is governed by the local Ayuntamiento, based in Teulada. It is formed of 17 elected councillors and led by the mayor, who selects councillors to sit on a separate Governing Board to support him in performing his duties. Since May 2015, the mayor has been Carlos Linares who replaced Antoni Joan Bertomeu after he chose not to stand for reelection to the Ayuntamiento. That election saw the People's Party retain control of the municipality with a majority of seats on the council.

Summary of the 24 May 2015 Teulada-Moraira municipal election results
Parties and coalitions	Popular vote			Seats	
Parties and coalitions	Votes	%	±pp	Total	+/−
People's Party (PP)	1,635	46.5	–7.4	9	–1
Movimento RED	851	24.2	New	4	New
Spanish Socialist Workers' Party (PSOE)	624	17.75	–10.75	3	-2
Commitment Coalition (Compromís)	354	10.07	New	1	New

Blank and void ballots	105	2.98	–0.47		
Total	3,569			17	±0
Valid votes	3,569	97.14	+0.46		
Invalid votes	105	2.85	–0.46		
Votes cast / turnout	3,674	45.59	–6.45		
Abstentions	4,259	54.41	+6.45		
Registered voters	7,828				

== Economy ==
Moraira's historic roots as a fishing village are still in evidence; its fish market is one of the most popular in the Costa Blanca region and the port has five fishing boats in operation. The Moraira region is also famous for the growing of Muscatel grapes for wine-making.

However, the economy of Moraira is now built around tourism and Spanish property sales that have transformed the coastline over the past 30 years. Strict planning regulations have prevented over development and high rise buildings, making it a highly desirable destination. Little remains of the fishing cottages that once made up the little port that serviced the town of Teulada that stands at the head of the valley. To preserve the heritage of the area, the Teulada council passed laws protecting the abundant pine trees and limited the height of buildings. It has a privately owned marina built in 1985, operated by Club Náutico Moraira. Moraira is also seen as a culinary destination, with many restaurants. Moraira has three sandy beaches popular with families, and many rocky coves and inlets frequented by snorkellers and scuba divers.

There is a large market selling all sorts of things on Fridays (8.30am to 1.30pm), in the main car park.

Yacht club Moraira The yacht club, “Club Náutico” has 620 embarkation points. It includes an association club which is provided with restaurants and shops. Also in summer they have sailing courses and regattas. The championship of the district for open sea yachts is held at Easter, the regatta “Moraira Santa Eulalia” takes place at the end of September.
