= Teulada, Spain =

Teulada
- Municipality
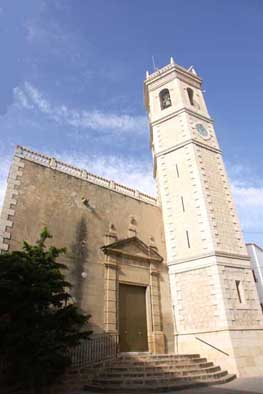
- Church of St. Catherine.

- Coat of arms

- Location in the Province of Alicante Location in the Valencian Community Location in Spain
- Coordinates: 38°43′45″N 0°6′07″E
- Country: Spain
- Autonomous community: Valencian Community
- Province: Alicante
- Comarca: Marina Alta
- Judicial district: Dénia

Government
  - Mayor: Vicente Raúl Llobell Signes (PP)

Area
  - Total: 32.24 km^{2} (12.45 sq mi)
- Elevation: 185 m (607 ft)

Population (2025-01-01)
  - Total: 12,912
  - Density: 400.5/km^{2} (1,037/sq mi)
- Time zone: UTC+1 (CET)
  - Summer (DST): UTC+2 (CEST)
- Postal code: 03724, 03725
- Official language(s): Valencian, Spanish
- Website: www.teulada-moraira.org

Teulada (Valencian: [tewˈlaða]; Spanish: [tewˈlaða]) is a small coastal town on Spain's Costa Blanca, located 3 km north from Junction 63 of the A7 E-15 toll motorway on the N-332 coast road.

Setting it apart from its coastal neighbours of Calp and further south, Benidorm, the town council passed laws limiting the height of buildings and protecting the natural pines that cover the sides of the valley leading to the coastal part of the municipality, Moraira.

== History ==
The earliest signs of a settlement date back to the Upper Paleolithic Period (15–20,000 BC) with remains discovered in a cave on the headland (Cap d'Or). Teulada was founded in 1386 and during the 16th century was fortified due to the constant attacks by Barbary pirates. The lookout tower on the peninsular headland still remains and has been partially restored.

The economy was dominated by agriculture influenced by the period of occupation by the Moors. The walled terraces on the hillsides of the area are still present and allowed for orchards of almonds, vines and citrus fruits to be grown.

== Economy ==
The economy of Teulada is dominated by the tourism industry and fuelled by the construction industry which is forever expanding the community size. The influence of the European expatriate community of predominantly English, German and Dutch residents has grown to the extent that in 1999 a political party of predominantly non-Spanish residents, The Moraira Party, won control of the town hall in local elections. Since this time there has been a progressive investment policy in local facilities especially in the coastal area of Moraira.

Teulada retains its Spanish heritage and traditions. The street market held on Wednesday mornings, and the numerous fiestas that occur throughout the year provide an example of Spanish customs, and some firework displays.

== Main sights ==
- Parish church of St. Catherine (early 16th century)
- Sala de Jurats i Justícia de Teulada (17th century)
- Castle of Moraira
- Cap d'Or Tower (1563)
- Hermitages of St. Vincent Ferrer, Divina Pastora and Fonta Santa

== Culture ==
Local fiestas include:

- San Vincente Ferrer – Held every Monday after Easter to celebrate the Patron Saint.
- Moros y Critianos (Moors and Christians) – Held during the second week in June.
- Festa del Moscatell – Held the first Saturday in September.
- Santa Catalina – Held on 25 November.
