= Payback Press =

The Payback Press was a specialist imprint of Canongate Books devoted to (initially) reprints of essays on Black culture, which later branched out into contemporary Black fiction and classic crime novels. Of the former category, the first three novels published by the imprint were "Blues People" by LeRoi Jones (Amiri Baraka), "Black Talk" by Ben Sidran, and "The New Beats" by S.H. Fernando, Jr. Notable fiction and classic crime novels included Chester Himes and Clarence Cooper Jr and Iceberg Slim. The imprint's name references the James Brown song The Payback (song), which, explained by Jamie Byng, head of Canongate Books, addressed the need of "repaying a debt by making people more aware of the tremendous importance of black culture and its role in our lives." Payback Press is credited for potentially saving certain books from obscurity, either relaunching books that had gone out of print or had never been published in the UK.

== Notable books published by Payback Press ==
=== Fiction ===
- Black, Clarence Cooper, Jr.
- The Farm, Clarence Cooper, Jr.
- The Scene, Clarence Cooper, Jr.
- Weed & The Syndicate, Clarence Cooper, Jr.
- Howard Street, Nathan Heard
- The Harlem Cycle (Volumes 1-3), Chester Himes
- The Lonely Crusade, Chester Himes
- Not Without Laughter, Langston Hughes
- One People, Guy Kennaway
- Under African Skies, ed. by Charles Larson
- Indaba, My Children, Credo Mutwa
- Portrait of a Young Man Drowning, Charles Perry
- Giveadamn Brown, Robert Deane Pharr
- The Nigger Factory, Gil Scott-Heron
- The Vulture, Gil Scott-Heron
- Corner Boy, Herbert Simmons
- Man Walking on Eggshells, Herbert Simmons
- Death Wish, Iceberg Slim
- Airtight Willie and Me, Iceberg Slim
- Long White Con, Iceberg Slim
- Mama Black Widow, Iceberg Slim
- Trick Baby, Iceberg Slim
- Doom Fox, Iceberg Slim
- The Jones Men, Vern Smith
- Panther, Melvin Van Peebles
- One for New York, John A. Williams
- Spooks, Spies, and Private Eyes, ed. by Paula L. Woods

=== Non-fiction ===
- Fight the Power, Chuck D
- The New Beats, S.H. Fernando, Jr.
- Born Fi' Dead, Laurie Gunst
- Blues People, LeRoi Jones (Amiri Baraka)
- Beneath the Underdog, Charles Mingus
- Black Fire, Nelson Peery
- Black Talk, Ben Sidran
- Pimp, Iceberg Slim
- The Naked Soul of Iceberg Slim, Iceberg Slim
- Space is the Place, John F. Szwed
- Sweet Sweeback's Badasssss Song, Melvin Van Peebles

=== Poetry ===
- The Fire People, ed. by Lemn Sissay
