= Duende (disambiguation) =

A duende is a supernatural being in the folklore of Iberia, Latin America and the Philippines.

Duende or duendes may also refer to:

== Music ==
- "Duende" (art), a Spanish term invoking emotion and authenticity associated with flamenco
- "Duende" (song), a 1997 song by Delerium
- "Duende", a 2005 song by Daryl Braithwaite from Snapshot
- Duende (Avishai Cohen album), a 2012 album by Avishai Cohen
- Duende (Rita and ELK album), a 2024 album by Rita and ELK
- Duende, an album by Killing Joke
- Duendes, a 2008 album by Ivonne Guzmán

== Other uses ==
- 367943 Duende, a near-Earth asteroid
- Duendes Rugby Club, an Argentine rugby union club
- Duende (poetry collection), a 2022 poetry collection by Quincy Troupe
- Duende, a 2007 poetry collection by Tracy K. Smith

== See also ==
- Duende y mysterio del flamenco, or Flamenco, a 1952 documentary film
- Duwende, a similar creature in Filipino mythology
- El Duende (disambiguation)
