= Avishai (name) =

Avishai or Avishay (Hebrew: אבישי) is a Jewish given name and surname taken from the Biblical figure Abishai. Notable people with the name include:

== Given name ==
- Avishai Abrahami, founder of wix.com
- Avishai Ben-Haim (born 1968), Israeli journalist
- Avishay Braverman
- Avishai Cohen (disambiguation), several people
- Avishai David
- Avishai Dekel
- Avishay Hadari
- Avishai Henik
- Avishai Jano
- Avishai Margalit
- Avishai Raviv

== Surname ==
- Bernard Avishai
