= Howard Street =

Howard Street may refer to:

- Howard Street (Baltimore), a major street in Downtown Baltimore, Maryland
  - Howard Street Tunnel fire, a disaster that struck the freight railroad tunnel under Baltimore's Howard Street in 2001
- Howard Street (Sheffield), a short street in Sheffield, England
- Howard Street (Chicago), a major street in the Chicago metropolitan area
- Howard Street Apartment District in Omaha, Nebraska
- Howard Street, London, a demolished street in London
- Howard Street (San Francisco), a street in Soma and the Mission districts of San Francisco
- Howard Street (novel), by Nathan Heard, 1968
