= Abishai =

Abishai may refer to:

- Abishai (biblical figure), the eldest son of Zeruiah, King David's sister
- Abishai, a Semitic chief who offered gifts to the Lord of Beni-Hasan according to an inscription in Middle Egypt
- Abishai (Dungeons & Dragons), a type of monster in Dungeons & Dragons
- Avishai (name)
