= Miles: The Autobiography =

1989 book by Miles Davis and Quincy Troupe

- First edition cover
- Author: Miles Davis with Quincy Troupe
- Language: English
- Subject: Autobiography
- Publisher: Simon & Schuster
- Publication date: 1989
- Publication place: United States
- Media type: Print
- Awards: American Book Award (1990)
- ISBN: 978-0-671-63504-6
- OCLC: 20015144
- Dewey Decimal: 788.9/2165/092 B
- LC Class: ML419.D39 A3 1989

Miles: The Autobiography is the autobiography of American jazz musician Miles Davis. First published in 1989, the book was written by Davis with poet and journalist Quincy Troupe.

== Background ==
In 1985, Spin magazine hired Troupe to write an exclusive two-part interview with Miles Davis. The interview was published in the November 1985 and December 1985 issues of Spin. Davis showed great appreciation for Troupe's work, and Troupe was later contacted by Simon & Schuster to sign on as co-author for Davis's autobiography.

== Reception ==
Publishers Weekly wrote, "On almost any score, this is a remarkable book."

Writing for The Atlantic, Francis Davis (no relation) felt that "the book is so successful in capturing Davis's voice", but nonetheless criticized Davis as being "peacock vain" and criticizing his "contemptible" treatment of women.

It won an American Book Award in 1990.

The audiobook version, narrated by LeVar Burton, was nominated for Best Spoken Word or Non-Musical Album at the 36th Annual Grammy Awards.
