= Quincy Troupe =

American poet (born 1939)

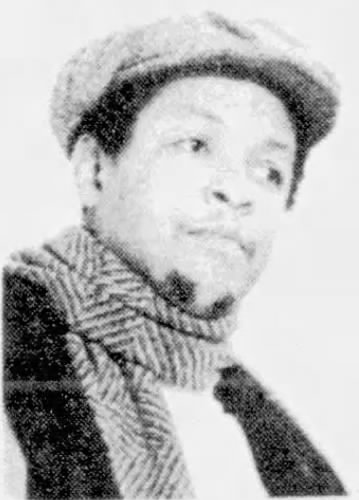
- Troupe c. 1977
- Born: Quincy Thomas Troupe, Jr. July 22, 1939 (age 87); St. Louis, Missouri, US
- Occupations: Poet, editor, journalist, professor emeritus
- Writing career
- Notable works: Miles: The Autobiography, with Miles Davis (1989)

Quincy Thomas Troupe, Jr. (born July 22, 1939) is an American poet, editor, journalist and professor emeritus at the University of California, San Diego, in La Jolla, California. He is best known as the biographer of Miles Davis, the jazz musician.

== Early life ==
Troupe is the son of baseball catcher Quincy Trouppe (who added a second "P" to the family name while playing in Mexico to accommodate the Spanish pronunciation "Trou-pay"). Troupe was athletic and tall for his age. As a teenager he played basketball at Beaumont High School in St. Louis, where he and his brother were one of the first black families to help integrate the school. While Troupe was on the team they won a state championship.

As a teenager in 1955, he recalled hearing Miles Davis at a St. Louis, Missouri, fish joint, where some fellow patrons identified the 78 rpm juke-box record as "Donna", which was Davis's first recorded composition. (The record is most likely to have been the Charlie Parker Quintet session recorded for Savoy Records on May 8, 1947.)

In his book Miles and Me Troupe recalls the experience:

When I left that joint that afternoon, I felt as though I had undergone a secret initiation, a rite of passage, one that would separate me forever from the rest of the students at Beaumont High School, to which I had just transferred. The school was overwhelmingly white and the students there were "square" to the bone. To my way of thinking, hardly anyone there had any sense of style.

Troupe later attended Grambling State University on a basketball scholarship. However, after his first year he quit and subsequently joined the United States Army, where he was stationed in France, playing on the Army basketball team. While there, he had a chance encounter with the noted French Existentialist philosopher, Jean-Paul Sartre, who suggested to Troupe that he try his hand at poetry.

When he returned to civilian life, Troupe moved to Los Angeles, California, where he decided to pursue writing, enrolling in journalism classes at the Los Angeles City College. Around this time he began writing for the Los Angeles Free Press. Shortly after the Watts riots, (sometimes referred to as the Watts Rebellion or Watts Uprising) he became a regular presence at the Watts Writers Workshop and began working in a more jazz-based style. The Workshop was located in a building that also had a theater, allowing members to do readings, plays and presentations. It was a meeting point for many in the Black Power movement, Black Arts Movement and the civil rights movement and through it Troupe met many writers including Ishmael Reed (Umbra Group), Wanda Coleman and James Baldwin. In 1968, Troupe edited the anthology Watts Poets: A Book of New Poetry and Essays that included the work of twenty one writers.

His work is associated with Black Arts Movement writers such as Amiri Baraka, Nikki Giovanni, Wanda Coleman, Haki Madhubuti and Ishmael Reed, who were also friends. Their work was diverse but was strongly informed by world literature and jazz music. Some time later, it emerged that the Workshop had been a target of the covert FBI counterintelligence program COINTELPRO, and that the Workshop, along with its theater, were burned to the ground in 1973 by the FBI informant and infiltrator Darthard Perry (a.k.a. Ed Riggs). It also emerged that Riggs had not only been sabotaging equipment at the Workshop but also used his association with it to infiltrate the Los Angeles chapter of the Black Panthers, and numerous other organizations that promoted black culture, ultimately being instrumental in their demise.

== Career ==
Throughout the 1970s, Troupe lived in New York, teaching at the College of Staten Island. During that time, he was a regular on the poetry circuit, performing alone or in groups around the country.

In 1985, Spin magazine hired Troupe to write an exclusive two-part interview with Miles Davis, which led Simon & Schuster to him as co-author for Davis's autobiography. Miles: The Autobiography was published in 1990 and won an American Book Award for the authors, garnering them numerous positive reviews and accolades.

From 1991 to 2003, Troupe was professor of Caribbean and American literatures and creative writing at the University of California, San Diego (UCSD), in La Jolla, California.

On June 11, 2002, Troupe was appointed California's first poet laureate by then Governor Gray Davis. A background check related to the new political appointment revealed that Troupe had, in fact, never possessed a degree from Grambling; he attended for only two semesters in 1957–58 and then dropped out. After admitting that he had not earned a degree, he made the decision to resign, rather have it become a political issue for the Democratic Governor. As a consequence, Troupe resigned from the poet laureate's position in October 2002 and retired from his post at UCSD.

Shortly after the controversy, Troupe moved back to New York City.

The year 2006 saw the publishing of his collaboration with self-made millionaire Chris Gardner on the latter's autobiography, The Pursuit of Happyness. The book served as the inspiration for a film of the same name later that year starring Will Smith.

Other notable works by Troupe include James Baldwin: The Legacy (1989) and Miles and Me: A Memoir of Miles Davis (2000). He also edited Giant Talk: An Anthology of Third World Writing (1975) and is a founding editor of Confrontation: A Journal of Third World Literature and American Rag. In 2022, Troupe released a poetry anthology, Duende, with Seven Stories Press, which was later longlisted for the 2022 National Book Award for Poetry.

Troupe currently lives in New York City with his wife, Margaret.

== Books ==
- Duende: Poems, 1966-Now, Seven Stories Press (2022)
- Seduction: New Poems, 2013-2018, TriQuarterly (1018)
- Ghost Voices A Poem in Prayer, TriQuarterly (2018)
- Miles and Me, (new edition) Seven Stories Press (2018)
- Earl the Pearl: My Story by Earl Monroe & Quincy Troupe, Rodale Press (2013)
- Errançities, New Poems, Coffee House Press (2011)
- The Architecture of Language, Coffee House Press (2006)
- The Pursuit of Happyness, by Chris Gardner and Quincy Troupe, HarperCollins/Amistad (2006)
- Little Stevie Wonder, A children's book, Houghton-Mifflin (2005)
- Transcircularities; New and Selected Poems, Coffee House Press, October (2002)
- Take it to the Hoop Magic Johnson, a children's book, Jump At The Sun, a division of Hyperion/Disney Books of Children (2001)
- Miles and Me, University of California Press (2000)
- Choruses, poems, Coffee House Press (1999)
- Avalanche, poems, Coffee House Press (1996)
- Weather Reports: New and Selected Poems, Harlem River Press, New York and London (1991)
- Miles: The Autobiography, Miles Davis with Quincy Troupe, Quincy Troupe, Co-author, Simon & Schuster, New York, 1989
- James Baldwin: The Legacy ed., Touchstone Press (Simon & Schuster), New York (1989)
- Skulls Along the River, poems, Quincy Troupe, I. Reed Books, New York (1984)
- Snake-Back Solos: Selected Poems 1969-1977, Quincy Troupe, I. Reed Books, New York (1979)
- The Inside Story of T.V.'s Roots, Quincy Troupe and David L. Wolper, Warner Books, New York (1978)
- Giant Talk: An Anthology of Third World Writing, Rainer Schulte and Quincy Troupe, eds., Random House, New York (1972)
- Embryo, Quincy Troupe, Balenmir House, New York (1972)
- Watts Poets and Writers, Quincy Troupe, ed., House of Respect, California (1968)
