= Gordon's War =

1973 film by Ossie Davis

- Directed by: Ossie Davis
- Written by: Howard Friedlander; Ed Spielman
- Produced by: Robert Schaffel
- Starring: Paul Winfield
- Cinematography: Victor J. Kemper
- Music by: Angelo Badalamenti (as Andy Badale); Al Elias
- Production company: Palomar Pictures
- Distributed by: 20th Century Fox
- Release date: August 9, 1973
- Running time: 90 minutes
- Country: United States
- Language: English
- Budget: $1.6 million
- Box office: $1,250,000 (US/ Canada rentals)

Gordon's War is a 1973 blaxploitation action film written by Howard Friedlander & Ed Spielman, directed by Ossie Davis and starring Paul Winfield.

== Plot ==
Gordon, a soldier from Harlem, returns home from his tour of duty in Vietnam to find his old neighborhood has been taken over by drug dealers and pimps. Outraged and heartbroken after his wife dies of a heroin overdose, he partners with three other ex-Vietnam soldiers and pledges to use their combat experience to go to war against the criminals.

== Cast ==
- Paul Winfield as Gordon Hudson
- Carl Lee as Bee Bishop
- David Downing as Otis Russell
- Tony King as Roy Green
- Gilbert Lewis as Harry "Spanish Harry" Martinez
- Carl Gordon as Luther "The Pimp"
- Nathan Heard as "Big Pink"
- Grace Jones as Mary
- Jackie Page as Bedroom Girl
- Chuck Bergansky as White Hitman
- Adam Wade as Hustler
- Hansford Rowe as Dog Salesman
- Warren Taurien as "Goose"
- Ralph Wilcox as Black Hitman
- David Connell as Hotel Proprietor
- Rochelle LeNoir as Gordon's Wife
- Charles McGregor as Jim, Drug Dealer On Subway Station Platform (uncredited)

== Soundtrack ==
The music heard throughout the film has become a well-respected album in its own right, performed by Badder Than Evil, Barbara Mason, New Birth and Sister Goose And The Ducklings.

Most songs were composed and performed by Badder Than Evil, a funk / R&B project of Albert Sahley Elias (credited as Al Elias) and Angelo Badalamenti (credited as Andy Badale). Their track Hot Wheels (the chase) has been sampled by scores of artists including Public Enemy, Coldcut and Blade.

== Reception ==
The New York Times called it an inconclusive film, one that had a "format and substance—a black theme dramatized, for practical, constructive purposes—remain exceeded by its goal." Jacob Knight of Birth.Movies.Death called it "one of the most valuable works to come out of '70s Blaxploitation."

== See also ==
- List of American films of 1973
