= Duende (poetry collection) =

2022 poetry collection by Quincy Troupe

Duende: Poems, 1966–Now
- Author: Quincy Troupe
- Publisher: Seven Stories Press
- Publication date: January 25, 2022
- Pages: 656
- ISBN: 978-1644210468

Duende: Poems, 1966–Now is a 2022 poetry collection by Quincy Troupe, published by Seven Stories Press. A selected anthology of Troupe's work over five decades, it was longlisted for the 2022 National Book Award for Poetry.

== Contents and background ==
Troupe was born in St. Louis, Missouri; his father was Quincy Thomas Troupe, a baseball player who signed to the Cleveland Indians at age 39. Troupe would often follow his father when the latter traveled for games. Later, Troupe went to the army and lived in Los Angeles, California where he led workshops at the Watts Writers Workshop. From then on, he would teach literature and writing at several universities through his adult life and publish several collections of poetry. His first poetry collection, Embryo, was released in 1972. An adult during the Black Arts Movement, Troupe became close to several figures at the time including Miles Davis with whom he co-wrote Miles: The Autobiography and Miles and Me. He also co-wrote The Pursuit of Happyness with Chris Gardner; the book would later be adapted to film starring Will Smith in 2006.

The book combines selected works from Troupe's bibliography, including Embryo, with previously unpublished material. Previously published works excerpted in the book are: Embryo, 1972; Snake-Back Solos, 1978; Skulls along the River, 1984; Weather Reports: New and Selected Poems, 1991; Avalanche, 1996; Choruses, 1999; Transcircularities: New and Selected Poems, 2002; The Architecture of Language: Poems, 2006; Errançities, 2012; Ghost Voices: A Poem in Prayer, 2019; Seduction: New Poems, 2013–2018, 2019.

== Critical reception ==
In a starred review, Library Journal commended Troupe as "a troubadour of his generation" and said "His lines are often Whitmanesque in their expansiveness, their scope, and their depth, whether he's writing about the heritage of slavery and continued racism, the glories of jazz (particularly Miles Davies and John Coltrane), prominent figures like Tiger Woods and Michael Jackson, or fellow poets living and dead"; the publication's verdict called the book "A highly recommended work from a master poet."

The New York Times wrote that "Troupe blurs the line between poetry and music; his work is filled with blues and griot songs, rap and especially the 'immortal burning flame of Black jazz.'" The African American Literature Book Club called the book a "mammoth assembled work" and concluded: "Back in the day, poetry was used to tell stories of life and death, joy and sadness, love and disappointment, while celebrating the mythic figures of sports, culture, and politics. Quincy Troupe's work contains all of the classic poems’ ingredients, designed to bewitch and cast a spell on the reader. This is truly impressive work."
