= El Duende =

El Duende may refer to:

- El Duende (newspaper), an 1821 Dominican newspaper
- El Duende, New Mexico, United States, an unincorporated community and census-designated place
- El Duende!, a 2023 album by Radamiz

== See also ==
- Duende (disambiguation)
