= Skiz Fernando =

American writer and musician

- Born: Sarath H. Fernando Jr. 1968 (age 57–58); Texas
- Other name: S. H. Fernando Jr.
- Education: Columbia University Graduate School of Journalism
- Occupations: Journalist; writer; record producer; rapper
- Musical career
- Also known as: Spectre; The Ill Saint; Wordsound I-Powa; Slotek; Minister Fernando; Skza; The Eye
- Origin: Brooklyn, New York
- Genres: Illbient; hip hop; trip hop
- Years active: 1994–present
- Label: WordSound
- Formerly of: Scarab; Crooklyn Dub Consortium

Sarath "Skiz" Fernando (born 1968) is an American former music critic, who has written for The New York Times, Rolling Stone, The Source, Spin, and Vibe. Later, under the alias Spectre, he became a record producer, rapper, and electronica artist. He is the founder and the head of his own label WordSound, as well as the author of several books about hip hop music.

== Early life ==
Sarath H. Fernando Jr. was born in 1968 in Texas. His parents are Sri Lankan immigrants, and he is the only person in his family to be born in the United States. Fernando was raised in Pikesville, Baltimore County, Maryland and attended St. Paul's School for Boys.

Throughout childhood, he was listening to music records his brother and sister would bring home. His siblings were "much older" than him and were listening to Parliament-Funkadelic, Bob Marley, and David Bowie. In 1979, when he was around 11 years old, he heard the song "Rapper's Delight" on the radio. "For me, that was it. I had no idea what hip-hop even was, but I was mesmerized. A few years later, when Soul Sonic Force released 'Planet Rock,' I knew I wanted to be a part of that music", recalls Fernando. He became friends with "the only three black guys" in his school and started listening to their favorite music, which included LL Cool J and Run-DMC, while continuing listening to rock bands like the Smiths. In the following years, Fernando would dedicate time to exploring record stores in search of new artists and genres.

After graduating from Harvard College, Fernando moved to Greece, where he worked as a school teacher. At that time, he was unsure about his future plans. Since he loved hip hop, a year later he decided to move to New York City, which he viewed as the central place for hip hop. To justify the decision to his parents, he enrolled in the Columbia University Graduate School of Journalism, which he later graduated from.

== Journalistic career ==
During his time in Harvard, Skiz Fernando would listen to the Street Beat show on WHRB, a student radio station. The show was hosted by two Harvard College students, David Mays and Jonathan Shecter, who would later create The Source. Started as a one-page newsletter, The Source quickly turned into what The New York Times described as "the leading magazine on hip-hop music, culture and politics". Around 1992, after returning from Greece and meeting with Shecter, Fernando started writing for The Source magazine. In the following years, he contributed to various other publications, including Vibe, Rolling Stone, Spin, and The New York Times.

== Music career ==
=== 1993–1994: Beginning of music career and launching WordSound ===
Working as a journalist allowed Skiz Fernando to make connections in the music industry, giving him an opportunity to launch his own music career. In 1993, while working on a review for Material's Hallucination Engine, Fernando contacted the band's bassist Bill Laswell to take an interview. The two immediately became friends, and afterwards, Fernando would frequently visit Laswell's studio. There he met other artists, including funk musician George Clinton of Parliament-Funkadelic and jazz drummer Tony Williams. With a $1000 loan from Laswell, Fernando launched his own record label. He called it WordSound, after a dub compilation album Word Sound 'ave Power: Dub Poets And Dub. A warehouse in Williamsburg, Brooklyn was used as the label's headquarters.

WordSound released its first albums in 1994: The Red Shift compilation album and Scarab by the band Scarab. The band initially consisted of Skiz Fernando and his friend Professor Shehab. During that time, Fernando was trying to capture the music of like-minded artists around himself. The resulting compilation Certified Dope, Vol. 1 was released on WordSound in 1995, under the name Crooklyn Dub Consortium. The collective, apart from Fernando, also included drummer Doug Scharin as HiM, Bill Laswell as Automaton, the duo Sub Dub, Dr. Israel, and the band We™. According to AllMusic's Rick Anderson, the album "heralded the emergence of a new sound in underground music". In 2015, Fact magazine placed it at number 13 on their list of the 50 best trip-hop albums of all time, describing it as an album that "blended the dusty boom bap that ruled the city at the time with the mixing desk mysticism of Jamaican dub".

=== 1995–1996: Debut solo album and working with Prince Paul ===
While working on his 1994 book The New Beats, Fernando started learning music production, making music every night to relax. He took the pseudonym Spectre, which, according to the artist, represents his dark alter ego that is the exact opposite of himself, allowing him to "express his dark side". Later, he would use several other pseudonyms, including the Ill Saint, Slotek, and Wordsound I-Powa. Spectre's debut solo album, The Illness, was released through WordSound in 1995. Thomas Quinlan of Exclaim! noted the "morbid shred of fear and decay" in the album's sound, while AllMusic's John Bush in his review called The Illness a fusion of "hip-hop mysticism more than worthy of Wu-Tang" with production techniques akin to those used by the Jamaican producer Lee "Scratch" Perry. The style of music, employed on this album, would later be called illbient.

The release of The Illness ultimately led to Skiz Fernando collaborating with the producer Prince Paul. The mid-1990s was a troubled period in Prince Paul's career. Known for his early 1990s work with De La Soul and Gravediggaz, he now faced financial difficulties due to low album sales and was frustrated with the music industry. Fernando contacted him about recording an album, offering to do a small release of 1000 physical copies. According to Prince Paul, he wanted to make "one of the craziest recordings ever", marking the end of his career. The album, titled Psychoanalysis: What Is It?, was released in 1996, through WordSound. It was one of the earliest instrumental hip hop albums, featuring almost no rapping, with the only vocals throughout the majority of the album being skits. The album consists of rappers' monologues, where they discuss their obscene thoughts and dreams with a psychoanalyst with a distinct Viennese accent, over jazz-inspired beats. Psychoanalysis: What Is It? performed commercially far better than both the label and the artist anticipated, and became one of the best selling albums of the label. That prompted Tommy Boy Records to buy the album rights and re-release an updated version a year later. Prince Paul has said that the album "catapulted [his] career". Fernando later introduced him to Dan the Automator, which resulted in the formation of the Handsome Boy Modeling School duo and the subsequent release of their critically acclaimed debut album So... How's Your Girl? (1999).

Several other albums were released by WordSound in 1996. One of them was the second Crooklyn Dub Consortium compilation, titled Certified Dope, Vol. 2. MTV's music critic Kembrew McLeod praised the album's unique sound. He called Crooklyn Dub Consortium "some of the most innovative and cutting-edge sound sculptors", noting that despite Certified Dope, Vol. 2 being a compilation album it still sounds cohesive due to the artists' association with the label. The German magazine Spex placed Certified Dope, Vol. 2 at number 20 of their list of the 50 best albums of 1996. Among other albums Fernando released that year were Live from the Planet Crooklyn, released under the pseudonym Wordsound I-Powa through ROIR Records, Dread Western by Roots Control duo, a collaborative album with his former roommate Jeremy "Likkle Jer" Dawson, and a highly acclaimed Subterranean Hitz, Vol. 1 compilation. Described by AllMusic's John Bush as a mix of illbient and abstract hip hop, Subterranean Hitz, Vol. 1 featured a number of hip hop artists, including Rob Swift of X-Ecutioners, Scott Harding, Prince Paul, and Afrika Baby Bam of Jungle Brothers. In his review of the album, Tony Herrington of The Wire magazine categorized its tracks as "insulated studio odysseys" which require listeners to have "superhuman levels of concentration". According to Skiz Fernando, soon after the release he went to Fat Beats, one of the biggest hip hop record stores in New York City, asking them to sell copies of Subterranean Hitz, Vol. 1. But despite the album featuring numerous hip hop artists, the owner of the store refused to sell it, saying that "this isn't hip hop".

=== 1997–1999: WordSound's peak period ===
Spectre released his second solo album, The Second Coming, through WordSound in 1997. Spin magazine's reviewer Richard Gehr described the album as a "vampire-movie soundtrack", commending the album's sound, but noting that Spectre's ideas "[run] out of steam" towards its second half. During that year Fernando also introduced a new pseudonym, releasing the album 7 as Slotek. AllMusic's John Bush called the album a "sample mayhem", praising its production.

1998 saw the release of Subterranean Hitz, Vol. 2. Like the first compilation, it featured Rob Swift, Afrika Baby Bam, Prince Paul and Scott Harding. The album received positive reviews from music critics. Tim Haslett of CMJ New Music Monthly called it a "mandatory [listen] for anyone even remotely interested in the future of electronic music with hip-hop sensibilities at its heart". The Wire's Will Montgomery commended the album, noting its "broader set of sounds" and lyrics, that "expose just how dull your average raps are". The same year Spectre released Ruff Kutz, a 90-minutes mixtape that featured remixes and unreleased tracks from a number of label's artists, including Sensational, Mr Dead, Dubadelic, Techno Animal, Bill Laswell, and Jungle Brothers. Originally a limited WordSound cassette release, in 2015 Ruff Kutz was remastered and re-released on double vinyl and digitally, through PAN, an imprint label of Berlin-based artist Bill Kouligas. Fact magazine placed the re-release on their list of 25 best reissues of 2015, calling it a "freeform hotbox hit-parade of dirty Bowery beats, chopped and screwed breaks, and hefty helpings of echo-chamber dub mixology", that perfectly encapsulated the New York underground scene of the 1990s.

Multiple projects were released in 1999. Among them was the second Slotek album, Hydrophonic. AllMusic's John Bush noted Slotek's move away from samples towards "raps reminiscent of KRS-One" and praised the production that fits the album well. Another album released by WordSound that year was Certified Dope, Vol. 3: Escape From New York compilation. For the third album in the series, Crooklyn Dub Consortium collective was renamed to Crooklyn Dub Outernational, which signified their expansion into other territories, such as Europe, the UK, Jamaica and Japan. The Wire magazine placed Certified Dope, Vol. 3 on their list of the best albums of 1999.

=== 2000–present: WordSound's decline and later solo projects ===
Despite being an influential underground label and a pioneer of the illbient genre in the 1990s, in the early 2000s WordSound started gradually fading away from the mainstream media. In 2004, XLR8R magazine reported the label's "disappearance". In a letter published by the magazine in one of the later issues, Skiz Fernando explained that he didn't receive a $38,000 payment from one of the distributors in 2001, and in 2004 their European distributor Energie für Alle closed, owing the label $80,000. The artist believed those factors ultimately led to the decline in visibility of an already underground label, which he was running from his living room. Fernando had also moved from Brooklyn to his hometown Baltimore due to "skyrocketing rents". Nevertheless, he continued releasing music through WordSound over the years, but kept it mostly to his solo projects.

The third album in Spectre's trilogy, The End, was released in January 2000 (the release date is sometimes reported as late 1999). In his review for Exclaim!, Thomas Quinlan highlighted the album's atmospheric nature and its blend of exotic Spectre's instrumentals with tracks featuring guest vocalists. The Wire magazine included The End in their list of the best albums of the year 2000. The Ill Saint's third compilation album, Subterranean Hitz, Vol. 3: The III School, was also released in 2000. Mike DaRonco of AllMusic thought the album featured "hard-hitting beats" combined with "street-smart wit", while Exclaim!'s Thomas Quinlan found the album "worth repeated listens", despite feeling that some of the tracks were disappointing.

While working on his follow-up solo album, Spectre released two albums through Belgian label Quatermass. 2002's Parts Unknown was based on previously unreleased material and was a collaborative album with the rapper Sensational. The second Quatermass album was Retrospectre (2004) compilation. Dusted magazine's Casey Rae-Hunter noted the album's "captivating freshness", despite it spanning more than a decade's worth of material.

Spectre's fourth album, Psychic Wars, was released in 2003. In her review for XLR8R, Selena Hsu called the album "considerably less sludgy and not as obscured by [Spectre's] trademark impenetrable haze", while Heinrich Deisl of the German magazine Skug named it the most accessible release from Spectre. Rick Anderson of AllMusic commended "more energetic beats and lively interpolations of exotic foreign musical elements", but criticized the beginning of the album as being unnecessary. Dusted's Mason Jones thought the music on the album was "melancholy and slow", as it featured "orchestral stabs and ultra-low synth bass dominating the doom-laden sonic environments". He also noted that some of the samples fit "rhythmically awkwardly", but he believed it enhances the mood of the album.

WordSound released the fourth Crooklyn Dub Outernational's compilation, Certified Dope, Vol. 4: Babylon's Burning, in 2004. AllMusic's Chris Nickson called it a "good summation of the state of global dub today from a label that stays permanently on the edge". XLR8R reviewer Daniel Siwek commended the collective for their ability to provide a diverse range of musical styles while striking a perfect balance between classic elements and a modern sound. Exclaim!'s David Dacks thought the album deviates from the traditional dub sound, instead "[continuing] this series with an assemblage of spine crushers and outward-bound riddims". The Wire named it one of the best albums of the year.

Spectre released his next solo album, Transcendent, in 2006 through digital distribution. It was followed by 2008's Internal Dynasty, released digitally through WordSound, with a limited vinyl release through Monkey Tool label. Mike Lupica of Dusted magazine noted that the album "[remains] systemically disquieting, off-kilter and reassuringly distanced from any current trend in hip hop". In 2010, the artist released the next album by Spectre, titled Death Before Dying.

In 2012, Spectre released his ninth solo album, The True & Living. The album was funded through Kickstarter, and released both digitally and on vinyl. Laurent Fintoni, writing for Fact magazine, highlighted the album's "crisp and snappy" beats, but warned younger readers that it may sound dated. Exclaim!'s reviewer Thomas Quinlan called The True & Living a "dark and brooding" album, noting the consistency of Spectre's style and his improvements to it. Spectre's next project, Brand New Second Hand, was released digitally in 2014.

The tenth solo album by Spectre, The Last Shall Be First, was released in 2016. It was funded through Kickstarter, and was asserted to be the final album released as Spectre. To promote the Kickstarter campaign, Skiz Fernando released Doom & Boom: The Spectre Chronicles (1995-2015), a free compilation album which included tracks from every album previously released. Philip Freeman, in his article for Bandcamp Daily, described the album's sound as "beats verging on industrial at times, and the bass as tar-like as ever". In 2021, Fernando released EP titled Èminence Grise. It was released digitally under the pseudonym Tha Ill Saint, with a limited vinyl release through a German label LOWHOP-Records.

== Crooked ==
In 2000 while visiting family in Sri Lanka, Fernando wrote the script for a movie called Crooked. The film was shot in 25 days in April 2001 then edited and put through post production through the summer and winter of the same year. It was released on the Wordsound label as a soundtrack and a two disc DVD set in 2002.

== Discography ==
Studio albums

- The Illness (WordSound, 1995, as Spectre)
- The Second Coming (WordSound, 1997, as Spectre)
- 7 (WordSound, 1997, as Slotek)
- Hydrophonic (WordSound, 1999, as Slotek)
- The End (WordSound, 2000, as Spectre)
- Psychic Wars (WordSound, 2003, as Spectre)
- Transcendent (WordSound, 2006, as Spectre)
- Internal Dynasty (WordSound, 2008, as Spectre)
- Death Before Dying (WordSound, 2010, as Spectre)
- The True & Living (WordSound, 2012, as Spectre)
- Brand New Second Hand (WordSound, 2014, as Spectre)
- The Last Shall Be First (WordSound, 2016, as Spectre)

Extended plays

- Èminence Grise (LOWHOP, 2021, as Tha Ill Saint)

Mixtapes

- Ruff Kutz (WordSound, 1998, as Spectre)

Collaborative albums

- Scarab (WordSound, 1994, as The Mystic as part of Scarab)
- Dread Western (WordSound, 1996, as part of Roots Control)
- Parts Unknown (Quatermass, 2002, as Spectre feat. Sensational)
- Acid & Bass (WordSound, 2009, as Spectre feat. Sensational)

Compilation albums

- Certified Dope, Vol. 1 (WordSound, 1995, as part of Crooklyn Dub Consortium)
- Certified Dope, Vol. 2 (WordSound, 1996, as part of Crooklyn Dub Consortium)
- Live from the Planet Crooklyn (ROIR, 1996, as Wordsound I-Powa)
- Subterranean Hitz, Vol. 1 (WordSound, 1996, as The Ill Saint)
- Subterranean Hitz, Vol. 2 (WordSound, 1998, as The Ill Saint)
- Certified Dope, Vol. 3: Escape From New York (WordSound, 1999, as part of Crooklyn Dub Outernational)
- Subterranean Hitz, Vol. 3: The Ill School (WordSound, 2000, as The Ill Saint)
- Certified Dope, Vol. 4: Babylon's Burning (WordSound, 2004, as part of Crooklyn Dub Outernational)
- Retrospectre (Quatermass, 2004, as Spectre)
- Tunes from the Crypt (WordSound, 2006, as Spectre)

== Publications ==
- The New Beats: Exploring the Music, Culture, and Attitudes of Hip-Hop (1994, Payback Press; ISBN 038547119X)
- Rice & Curry: Sri Lankan Home Cooking (2011, Hippocrene Books; ISBN 0781812739)
- From the Streets of Shaolin: The Wu-Tang Saga (2021, Hachette Books; ISBN 9780306874444)
- The Chronicles of Doom: Unraveling Rap's Masked Iconoclast (2024, Astra House; ISBN 9781662602177)
