= Sensational (musician) =

Guyanese-American rapper (1974–2026)

- Also known as: Torture
- Born: Colin Julius Bobb; October 18, 1974; Guyana
- Died: c. August 11, 2026 (aged 51)
- Genres: Hip hop, experimental
- Occupations: Rapper, Producer
- Years active: 1992–2026
- Labels: Ipecac Records, Wordsound
- Website: facebook.com/pages/SENSATIONAL/

Colin Julius Bobb (October 18, 1974 – c. August 11, 2026), known professionally as Sensational, was a Guyanese-American rapper.

== Early life and career ==
According to the film The Rise and Fall and Rise of Sensational he got into music at a young age, including reggae and calypso. He was later led to hip-hop and was known to rap over Stockhausen records. According to the film, Sensational is the nephew of Edgar Rose, who played on a popular calypso song called "Labour Day."

In the mid-90s he made his debut working with the Jungle Brothers under the name Torture, and appeared on the single "Troopin' On The Downlow." He was later heavily featured on the unreleased Jungle Brothers album Crazy Wisdom Masters in 1993 (produced by Bill Laswell) but this was shelved by Warner Bros, due to having been too "experimental."

After taking time out from music-related activity, in 1997 he signed to Spectre's label Wordsound, changed his name to Sensational and released his debut album Loaded With Power. A review in The Wire magazine described the release as "...attenuated, fractured, spasmodic...perhaps the least conventional HipHop record you'll hear this year."

Loaded With Power was followed by two further albums for Wordsound: Corner The Market in 1999 and Heavyweighter in the year 2000.

His style was considered unique and different. On his debut he was forced to use his headphone cans as a makeshift microphone, and used sounds from old analogue equipment and found sounds which were recorded and then looped. His lyrics were often about weed intake or sci-fi based themes. A positive review of Heavyweighter in Rolling Stone magazine stated:

The beats are deliberately distorted and dirty, choruses are irregular, and lyrics routinely surge into overdubbed fuzz or muffled obscurity. If other MCs spit rhymes, Sensational gargles them out in an offhand jumble and then meanders out of the studio without bothering to shut off his primitive recording gear.

== Later life and career ==
In 2002, the Wordsound record label released the film Crooked, which starred Sensational as an underground rapper.. Producer Skiz Fernando explained: "I was just inspired by the life of Sensational, seeing how this guy lived, all the stuff he was into. The movie is partially based on his life, partly fictionalised."

The early 2000s also saw a prolific release schedule, with several albums coming out on Mike Patton's Ipecac Recordings, Belgian label Quatermass (a subsidiary of Sub Rosa), Tape Records and Wordsound. Two singles were released on Matador Records.

Sensational's later musical output was known for his collaborations including Belgian Hip Hop producer R.E.D.A., Venezuelan techno artist Cardopusher, glitch/breakcore artist Kid 606, Handsome Boy Modeling School, DJ Scotch Bonnet, Kouhei Matsunaga and Kruton.

In 2009, Sensational played several live dates in Europe and Japan and was featured in a cover story for The Wire magazine.

In 2010, he was the subject of the independent documentary film The Rise And Fall And Rise Of Sensational, directed by EA Moore.

== Death ==
On August 11, 2026, producer and Bobb's collaborator Madteo announced that Bobb had died at the age of 51.

== Discography ==
- Loaded With Power (Wordsound, 1997)
- Corner The Market (Wordsound, 1999)
- Heavyweighter (Wordsound, 2000)
- Get on My Page (Ipecac Recordings, 2001)
- Spectre Featuring Sensational – Parts Unknown (Quatermass, 2002)
- Natural Shine (Wordsound, 2002)
- Mix Hits on a Fritz (Amazonas Jungle Records & Chunck Of Bliss, 2003)
- Crown Material (Chunk O Bliss, 2005)
- Speaks For Itself (Quatermass, 2005)
- Sensational Meets Kouhei (WordSound & Morphius Urban, 2006)
- Sensational, Göldin & Bit-Tuner – It's Sensational (Quiet Records, 2008)
- Sensational & Spectre – Acid & Bass (Wordsound, 2009)
- Sensational Meets Koyxeи – Sensational Meets Koyxeи (Skam, 2010)
- Anarchist Republic of Bzzz (with Arto Lindsay, Marc Ribot, Mike Ladd) (Sub Rosa and Important Records, 2012)
- Sensational & Ciroyelle – Connected Spirits (2019)
