= Clarence Cooper Jr. =

American author (1934–1978)

- Born: 1934; Detroit, U.S.
- Died: 1978 (aged 43–44); New York City, U.S.
- Other name: Robert Chestnut
- Occupation: American author
- Notable work: The Scene (1960); The Syndicate (1960)

Clarence L. Cooper Jr. (1934 – 1978) was an American author.

== Biography ==
Clarence Cooper Jr. was born in Detroit in 1934. He wrote seven crime novels that describe life in Black America, in the underworld of drugs and violence and in jail (The Farm). Cooper worked as an editor for The Chicago Messenger around 1955. He was said to have started taking heroin at this time.

His first book, The Scene, was a success with the critics; according to The New York Herald Tribune: “Not even Nelson Algren's The Man With the Golden Arm burns with the ferocious intensity you’ll find here." The Scene had been published by Random House, but Cooper's other three books were published by Regency, a pulp paperback publisher, while Cooper was in prison in Detroit: Weed (1961), The Dark Messenger (1962) and Yet Princes Follow, together with Not We Many, as Black: Two Short Novels (1962). Harlan Ellison was his editor. Cooper's last book, The Farm, takes place at the Lexington prison for drug addicts, once called U.S. Narcotics Farm.

Cooper's addiction and a growing alienation from those around him, perhaps driven by the hostile response to his fiction, all contributed to his early destitute death.

== Death ==
Cooper died penniless, strung out and alone in the 23rd street YMCA New York City in 1978.

== Published works ==
- The Scene (1960), described by the Library of Congress as autobiographical. ISBN 0-393-31463-4.
- The Syndicate (1960), as "Robert Chestnut", Chicago: Newsstand.
- Weed (1961).
- The Dark Messenger (1962), OCLC 2496855.
- Black, two short novels: Yet Princes Follow and Not We Many (1962)
- The Farm (1967). Crown Publishers. repr. ISBN 0-393-31785-4.
- Black (1997), a collection of three short novels: The Dark Messenger, Yet Princes Follow, and Not We Many. ISBN 0-393-31541-X.
- Weed and The Syndicate (1998)
