= Nathan Heard =

American novelist (1936–2004)

Nathan Heard (November 7, 1936 – March 16, 2004), sometimes known as Nathan C. Heard, was a best-selling author in the United States, noted for the grim realism of his novels. He is also known as one of the forefathers of street and prison literatures, having written his most famous book, Howard Street (1968), while serving time in the Trenton State Penitentiary for armed robbery.

Heard is the son of Blues singer Gladys Heard Johnson (née' Pruitt) and laborer Nathan E. Heard. He grew up in Newark, New Jersey, spending much of his life there. After the notoriety of Howard Street, Heard turned his life around and went on to become a guest lecturer.

Heard was also speech writer to Newark's first African American Mayor Ken Gibson. He also worked as a contributing writer for Essence Magazine and the New York Times.

He spent some time teaching creative writing at Fresno State College (now known as California State University, Fresno), where he won a teaching award in 1970. He also taught creative writing at Rutgers University.

His other books include A Cold Fire Burning, House of Slammers, To Reach a Dream and When Shadows Fall.

His movie credits include Gordon's War (1973). He was the featured narrator of the Ballad of Little Jimmy Scott (PBS).

He died of complications from Parkinson's disease.

== Filmography ==
Year	Title	Role	Notes
1973	Gordon's War	Big Pink	
