= Portrait of a Young Man Drowning =

1962 novel by Charles Perry

- First edition cover
- Author: Charles Perry
- Publisher: Simon & Schuster
- Publication date: January 1, 1962

Portrait of a Young Man Drowning, published in 1962, is the only published novel by American writer Charles Perry.

== Plot ==
The novel takes place in the slums of Brooklyn during the Great Depression, and follows the narrator, Harold Odum, from his early childhood to his death. His father, Hap, abandons the family, leaving Harold to be raised by his mother, Kate. Harold falls in with his friends from the neighborhood, who take him along to participate in petty crime. He soon joins up with "Bug", the neighborhood kingpin, and moves his way up through the local crime syndicate. He eventually becomes the neighborhood mob's killer for hire. Meanwhile, Kate spirals deeper into alcoholism and mental illness, and grows ever more possessive of her son.

Through it all, the only person Harold feels any love for is his mother; he develops an Oedipal complex and an inability to sexually relate to anyone without resorting to his alter-ego, Madden. In the guise of this other self, he rapes a local girl, Iris, with whom he later falls in love.

Harold attempts a relationship with Iris, but Kate threatens her away during a family dinner. The next day, Harold flies into a psychotic rage and rapes and kills his own mother, who he thinks committed suicide. A dazed, traumatized Harold then goes for a ride with some of his partners-in-crime, who are afraid that he, in his current mental state, will give out information about crimes that might involve them, and they make sure he never talks about it.

== Adaptations ==
The novel was adapted into the 1997 film Six Ways to Sunday, starring Norman Reedus and Deborah Harry.
