= Avishai David =

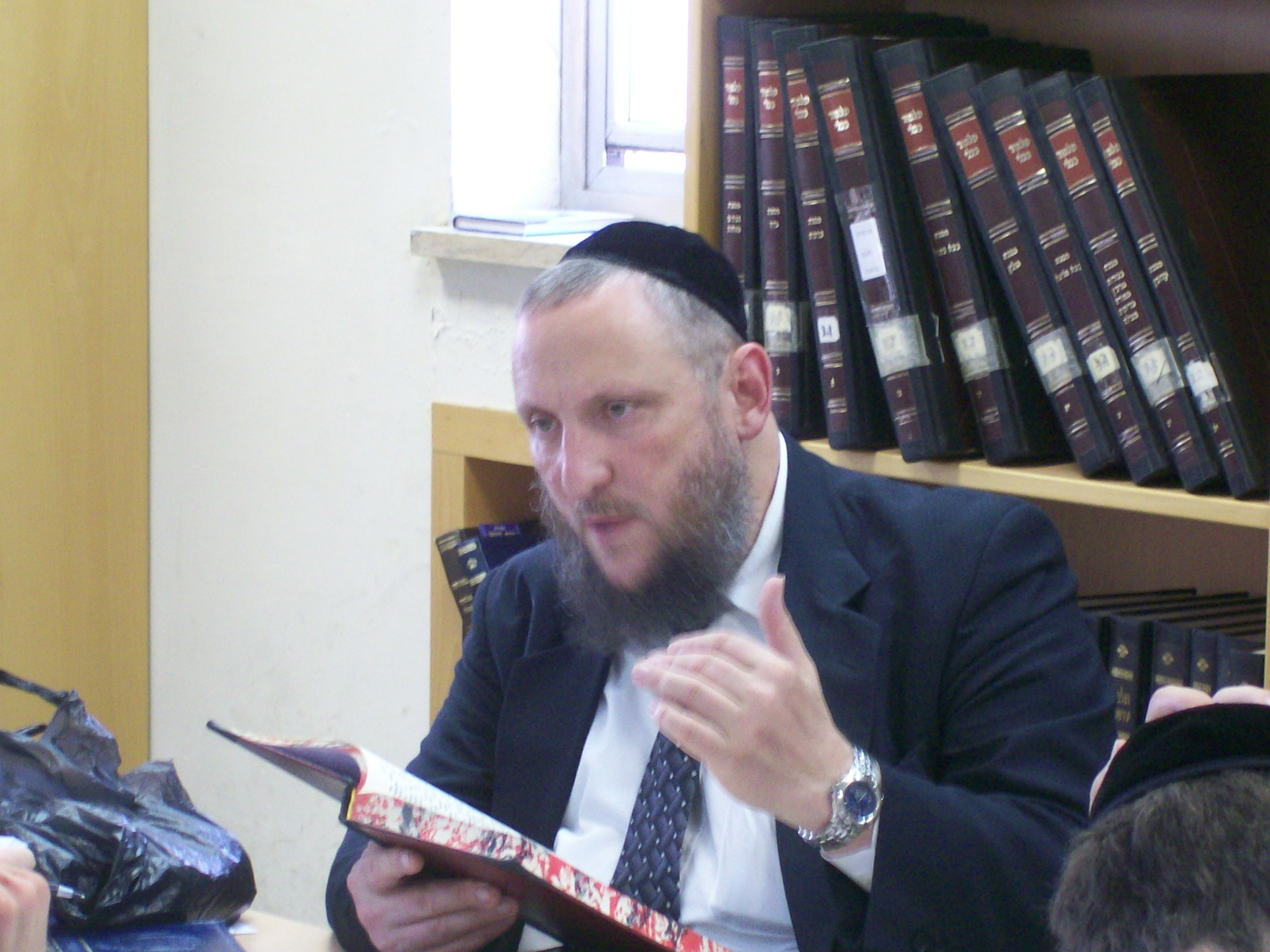
Avishai David

Rabbi Avishai Chaim David (Hebrew: אבישי חיים דוד; born 1949) is the Rosh Yeshiva of Yeshivat Torat Shraga (YTS) in Bayit VeGan, Jerusalem, Israel, and is the founding rabbi of Beit Medrash Torani Leumi (BMTL) in Beit Shemesh, which he left in August, 2017. He is currently the rabbi of Kehillas Beis Tefillah Yonah Avraham in Ramat Beit Shemesh.

David studied under Rabbi Joseph Soloveitchik for 14 years and received his semicha (ordination) from Rabbi Isaac Elchanan Theological Seminary (RIETS) at Yeshiva University in New York City. He is a student of Rabbi Avigdor Nevenzahl. He wrote "Dorosh Darash Yosef” (2011) a book on the weekly parsha based on the shiurim of Rabbi Yosef Dov Soloveitchik, and "The Warmth and Radiance of Gedolei Yisroel: Personal accounts, encounters, and experiences" (2023).

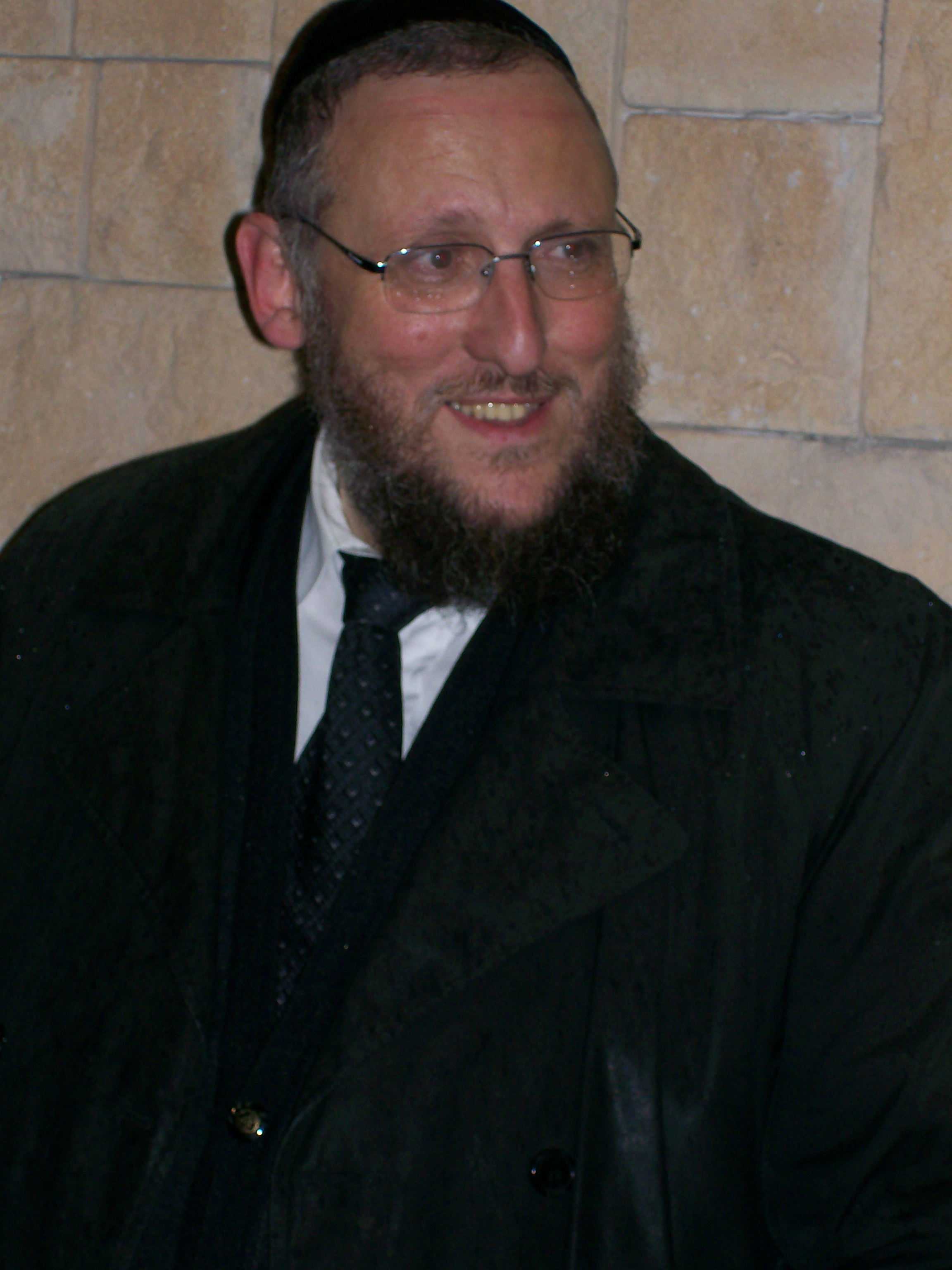

David lives in Ramat Beit Shemesh, where he is a community-wide posek and the rabbi of a local synagogue catering to American olim. His brother, Aharon David, is a rabbi at the Mir Yeshiva in Jerusalem.
