= Howard Street Apartment District =

Historic district in Nebraska, United States

- U.S. National Register of Historic Places
- U.S. Historic district
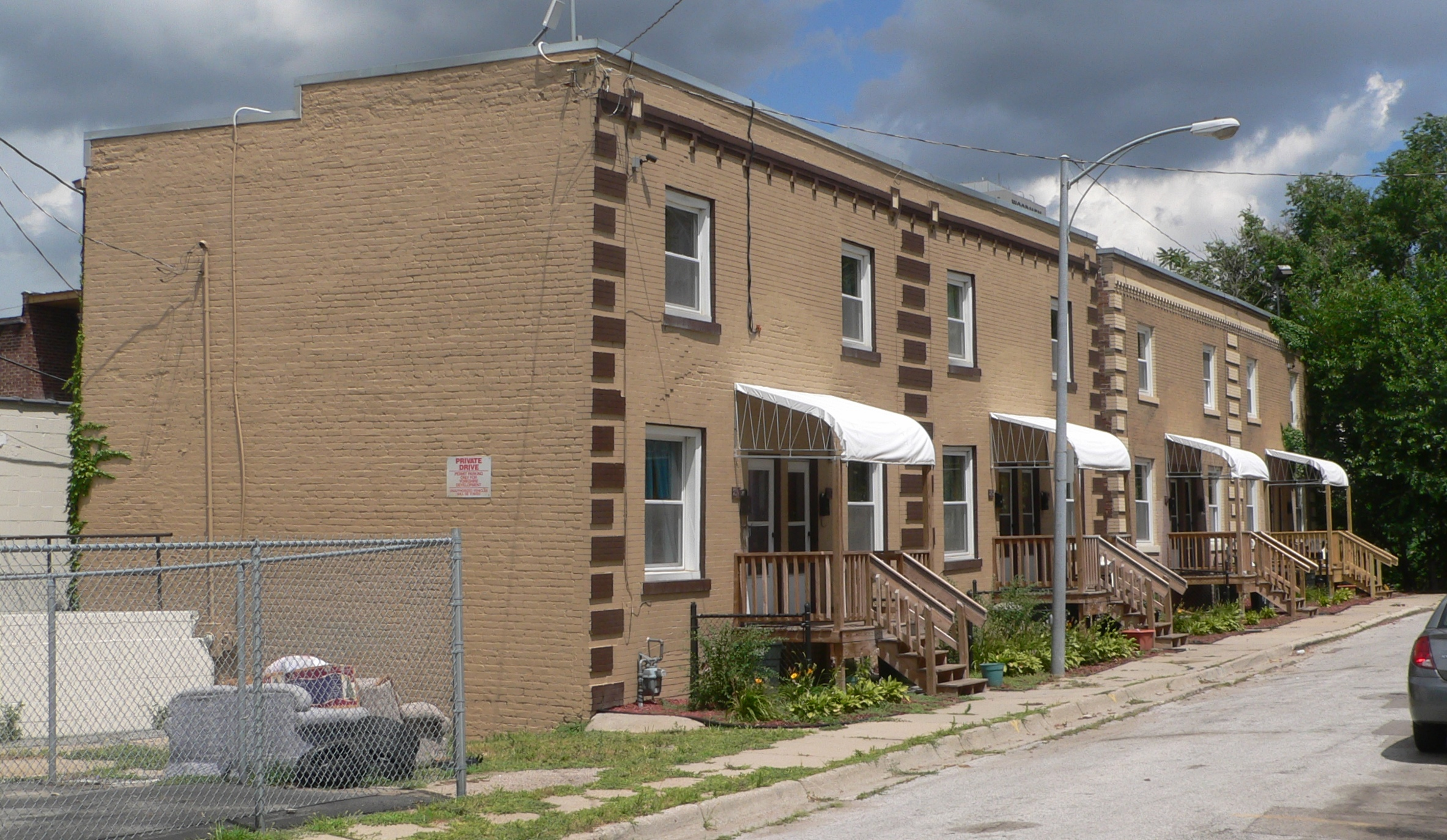
- Rowhouses at 2302-2316 Dewey Avenue

- Location within Nebraska Location within the United States
- Location: Omaha, Nebraska
- Coordinates: 41°15′21.07″N 95°56′43.74″W
- Built: 1885
- Architect: multiple
- Architectural style: Shingle Style, Prairie School
- NRHP reference No.: 96001382
- Added to NRHP: November 22, 1996

The Howard Street Apartment District is roughly bounded by Harney, South 22nd, Landon Court and South 24th Streets in downtown Omaha, Nebraska. The district includes rowhouses, apartments, and apartment courts, built between 1885 and 1930 in a variety of architectural styles.
