= Herbert Simmons =

American writer (1930–2008)

- Born: Herbert Alfred Simmons; March 29, 1930; St. Louis, Missouri, U.S.
- Died: August 18, 2008 (aged 78)
- Education: Lincoln University; Washington University in St. Louis (BA)
- Occupation: Writer

Herbert Alfred Simmons (March 29, 1930 – August 18, 2008) was an American writer.

== Biography ==
Herbert Alfred Simmons was born in St. Louis, Missouri on March 29, 1930. He attended Lincoln University in Missouri where he studied journalism. He interrupted his studies to do military service, and afterwards went to St. Louis' Washington University where he graduated with a B.A. in English Composition.

In 1957, his first novel Corner Boy was published and Simmons was awarded a Houghton Mifflin Literary Fellowship. In 1958, the novel saw a British edition. The paperback edition, which also appeared in 1958, helped to make the book popular for a number of years, resulting in respectable sales figures. His second novel, Man Walking on Eggshells appeared in 1962, supposedly as part one of a trilogy titled Destined to Free. However, parts two and three, tentatively titled Tough Country and The Land of Nod, never appeared and it is not known whether Simmons ever completed them. The biographical sketch in the former anthology seems to imply that Tough Country was possibly self-published in 1998. However, the Library of Congress does not have this title on record.

Following the 1965 Watts riots in Los Angeles, the Watts Writers Workshop was established with Simmons one of the key participants. Later, he became a lecturer at California State University, Northridge, retiring in the mid-1990s. Little else is known about him, and he had not published new material since 1962. However, his two novels have seen a number of new editions.

In 1979, Corner Boy was adapted for the stage.

Simmons died on August 18, 2008, at the age of 78.

== Novels ==
Simmons' two novels paint a vivid picture of life in the black ghetto prior to the civil rights movement. The protagonists are young black men drifting between a career in music and street life. Simmons's plots contain elements of naturalism as well as of hardboiled crime fiction. The language and rhythms of Simmons' novels has been compared to Bebop and Cool Jazz, and especially in Man Walking on Eggshells the prose is very rhythmical, following the forms and improvisational patterns of jazz.

== Bibliography ==
- Corner Boy. Houghton Mifflin, 1957
- Man Walking on Eggshells. Houghton Mifflin, 1962
