= Charles Perry (author) =

American novelist

Charles Perry (1924–1969) was an African American author whose only published novel was Portrait of a Young Man Drowning. He was born in Savannah, Georgia, but moved to Brooklyn when he was still in grade school. During the 1940s, he was a co-star of the hit radio series New World A-Coming.

== Portrait of a Young Man ==
Portrait of a Young Man Drowning draws heavily on Perry's first hand research of gangsters and juvenile delinquents in his own Brooklyn neighborhood. An homage to James Joyce's Portrait of the Artist as a Young Man, the novel is written in the first person and tells the story of Harold. He is a young man who gets sucked into Brooklyn's underworld scene, while living with an overbearing mother. The novel was considered ground-breaking when it was first published in 1962 because it was one of the first novels written in the first person by a black author with a white protagonist.

Perry soon began work on a semi-autobiographical account of the death of his 11-year-old son Charles Jr., who died falling from a tree onto a rod iron fence entitled I Wake Up Screaming.

Portrait of a Young Man Drowning was made into a film entitled Six Ways to Sunday in 1997.

Alongside his writing career, Perry also appeared in over 30 films mainly in minor roles.
