= Avishay Hadari =

Israeli artist

Avishay Hadari אבישי הדרי
- Born: 19 May 1976 (age 49); Tiberias, Israel
- Known for: Performing Arts, Fine Arts

Avishay Hadari (Hebrew: אבישי הדרי; born 19 May 1976) is an Israeli artist, theatre director, painter and graphic designer.

== Life and education ==
Hadari was born on 19 May 1976 in Tiberias, Israel. After graduating in 1994 from Thelma Yellin High School of the Arts in Tel Aviv, he then studied at The School of Visual Theatre in Jerusalem, where he became acquainted for the first time with the experimental Cricot 2 Theatre by the renowned Polish art philosopher Tadeusz Kantor. Hadari settled in Kraków in 1999 and studied directing at PWST. In 2009 he was granted Polish citizenship by the President of the Polish Republic.

== Early works ==
Hadari's first show Rust won four awards at the Acco Festival of Alternative Israeli Theatre (best play, best director's award, the set designer's award and the costume design award) in 1998. The show enjoyed considerable success and was performed at the Habima Israeli National Theatre and Tel Aviv Performing Arts Center – the New Israeli Opera.

In 1999 Hadari relocated to Poland and began MFA studies at the Faculty of Drama Directing of The Ludwik Solski Academy for the Dramatic Arts in Kraków (Państwowa Wyższa Szkoła Teatralna im. Ludwika Solskiego w Krakowie), where he worked with Krzysztof Globisz, Andrzej Wajda and Krystian Lupa.

Hadari graduated the PWST Academy in 2004. He translated Sh. An-Sky's play The Dybbuk into Polish as his diploma work. The translation was commissioned by Teatr Rozmaitości, Warsaw to be staged under the directorship of Krzysztof Warlikowski; in 2005 a special edition of the translation was published by Austeria publishing house, along with Andrzej Wajda's director's sketchbook.

In 2001 Hadari won the Award of the America-Israel Cultural Foundation, which funded a scholarship for him in Poland.

In 2002 he was awarded the IcExcellence Chosen Artist Award in Israel. Two years later, Hadari staged The Dybbuk at the Kraków Theatre Academy featuring actors from the Stary Teatr, including Krzysztof Globisz, Jerzy Grałek, Ewa Kolasińska, and graduates of the PWST Academy.

During the 16th Jewish Culture Festival in July 2006, Hadari staged The Dybbuk as a dramatic séance at the Izaak Synagogue in Kazimierz, Kraków.

== Works ==
2006–2009: An Icon of the City of Lublin

Later in 2006 the official presentation of a work by Avishay Hadari took place in the Old Town of Lublin. It was entitled: An Icon of the City of Lublin – a Multimedia Installation of the Legend of the Great Fire, and was created to celebrate the opening of the Lublin Underground Tourist Route.

As part of the celebrations of the Polish Year in Israel, he worked as the chief director's assistant during the staging of the opera Madame Butterfly, directed by Mariusz Treliński at the Israeli National Opera, Tel Aviv. In 2008 and 2009 he lectured at the Department of Set Designing at the Faculty of Painting, The Kraków Academy of Fine Arts and in theatre schools.

2009: Special Polish Citizenship, Opera Directing Course

In 2009 the President of the Polish Republic granted Avishay Hadari a special Polish citizenship, which was motivated by the contribution of the artist to Polish culture and his significant relationship with Poland. In 2010 he participated in an opera directing postgraduate program at the Kraków Academy of Music and PWST in Kraków.

2010: The Legend of Ancient Kraków – A Mechanical Theatre

On 24 September 2010 the opening of the modern museum Kraków Rynek Underground Museum took place, where Hadari carried out his multimedia installation, entitled The Legend of Ancient Kraków – A Mechanical Theatre. The piece combines diverse elements drawn from puppet theatres, visual theatre and film animation.

2011: Shoa Show - A Macabre Parody

On 11 June 2011 the premiere of Hadari's performance Shoa Show. A Macabre Parody took place at the Jerzy Szaniawski Dramatic Theatre, Wałbrzych. The play is based on themes from The Fiddler on the Roof and Hanoch Levin's Requiem.

2011–2012: The Silver Fox, Development Specialist - Alvernia Studios

In 2011 Hadari made his debut as an actor with Evgenia Dodina in a polish movie – Felicia T's Silver Fox, directed by Edward Etler (DOP: Jolanta Dylewska). He also worked as a second director in this film. In 2012 he was employed as a Development Specialist at the Development Department in Alvernia Studios, were as an artistic consulter was in charge of script editing and development coordinating.

== Awards ==
- Best Director Award, Acco Festival of Alternative Israeli Theatre 1998
- Best Performance Award, Acco Festival of Alternative Israeli Theatre 1998
- Set Designer Award, Acco Festival of Alternative Israeli Theatre 1998
- Costume Design Award, Acco Festival of Alternative Israeli Theatre 1998
- America – Israel Cultural Foundation Award 2001/2002
- IcExcellence Chosen Artist Award 2002/2003
- Special Citizenship for cultural contribution: Awarded by the Presidential Commission of the Polish Ministry of Foreign Affairs 2009
