= Avishai Cohen =

Avishai Cohen or Avishay Cohen may refer to:

- Avishai Cohen (bassist) (born 1970), Israeli jazz bassist
- Avishai Cohen (trumpeter) (born 1978), Israeli-born jazz trumpeter based in New York
- Avishay Cohen (born 1995), Israeli footballer
