= Howard Street (novel) =

1968 novel by Nathan C. Heard

- Cover of the 1968 Dial Press edition
- Author: Nathan C. Heard
- Language: English
- Publisher: Dial Press
- Publication date: 1968
- LC Class: PZ4.H4346 Ho

Howard Street is a 1968 novel by Nathan C. Heard. Howard Street was first published in 1968/ in hard copy by Dial Press. The paperback was published the same year by Signet Books. After the first publishing in 1968, over one million copies of the book were sold. Howard Street was Heard's first novel, and was published "shortly before he was released from jail."

== Overview ==
Howard Street tells the story of a multitude of characters living in the ghetto in Newark, New Jersey. Gypsy Pearl is described as the most beautiful whore on Howard Street, which is a high social and professional position in this community. She hustles for her pimp, Hip, and proudly gives him her money. Hip has a very expensive drug habit. Both Hip and Pearl are mutually dependent and accept one another in this loveless partnership.

Franchot, who is Hip's brother, is an outsider on Howard Street because he chooses to work for a living at a corny job. However, it is Franchot that Hip turns to when his luck runs out, and it is also Franchot that Pearl dreams of briefly when imagining another way of life.

Jackie, one of the few who were able to escape from Howard Street, leaves as a promising athlete, but returns as a broken man. Jimmy, the boy who had idolized the former basketball star, is destroyed by Jackie's downfall, because Jackie was only hope he had for a better life.

Although the novel takes place in Newark, New Jersey, the patterns and people of Howard Street share many similarities with any urban city. The novel provides insight into the lives of prostitutes, their Johns, drug dealers, drug addicts and other lost souls who have never known any other way to live.

== Reception ==
Howard Street is described as one of the best traditional books about ghetto life, and is often placed in the genre with other literary classics as Down These Mean Streets and Manchild In the Promised Land

The San Francisco Sun-Reporter called Howard Street, "...the raw shocker of the year...you must read it."
