= List of 227 episodes =

227 is an American sitcom television series created by C.J. Banks and Bill Boulware, that originally aired on NBC from September 14, 1985, to May 6, 1990, with a total of 116 episodes over the course of five seasons. The complete first season was released on DVD on September 28, 2004.

== Series overview ==
Season	Episodes	Originally released		Rank	Rating
Season	Episodes	First released	Last released	Rank	Rating
1	22	September 14, 1985	May 3, 1986	20	18.8
2	22	October 4, 1986	May 30, 1987	14	18.9
3	24	September 26, 1987	May 7, 1988	27	16.3
4	24	October 8, 1988	May 13, 1989	35	14.5
5	24	September 23, 1989	May 6, 1990	60	11.5

== Episodes ==
=== Season 1 (1985–86) ===
No. overall	No. in season	Title	Directed by	Written by	Original release date	Rating/share (households)
1	1	"Honesty"	Ellen Chaset Falcon	Bobby Crawford	September 14, 1985	23.8/40
Mary hits a parked car and leaves a note, then the car is totaled by a hit and run driver. She must convince Sandra to try and calm the man down and prevent him from pressing charges. Note: This episode was taped after the pilot to add additional characters and provide background for those in the pilot episode. Guest-starring Ken Foree.
2	2	"Mary's Brother"	Gerren Keith	Story by : Winston Moss; Teleplay by : Winston Moss and Dick Bensfield & Perry Grant	September 21, 1985	20.6/37
Mary fires Cupid’s arrow at her brother Lewis and best friend Rose, but missed the mark when Lewis sets his own sights on the resident vamp Sandra. Note: This episode was taped after the pilot to add additional characters and provide background for those in the pilot episode.
3	3	"Family Hero"	Ellen Chaset Falcon	Tracy Gamble & Richard Vaczy	September 28, 1985	15.6/26
Brenda's genealogy assignment triggers a war between her mother Mary and neighbor Sandra over famous ancestors—but Mary’s pride soon goes AWOL when she learns her family tree has root rot. Note: This episode was taped after the pilot to add additional characters and provide background for those in the pilot episode.
4	4	"The Refrigerator"	Ellen Chaset Falcon	Richard Vaczy & Tracy Gamble	October 5, 1985	18.0/31
After Mary's refrigerator breaks down, her sly neighbor Sandra agrees to use her "influence" on their landlord to get her a new one—in exchange for Mary lending her apartment to Sandra for a party. Note: This episode was taped after the pilot to add additional characters and provide background for those in the pilot episode. Guest-starring Fran Drescher
5	5	"Do You Love Me?"	Gary Brown	Bill Boulware and Jack Elinson	October 19, 1985	16.9/27
Mary and Sandra get a different view of womanhood when Mary attempts to rekindle lost love by "stepping" out” with husband Lester, while party-happy Sandra is home bound with her six-year-old niece. Note: This episode was taped after the pilot to add additional characters and provide background for those in the pilot episode.
6	6	"Pilot"	Oz Scott	Teleplay by : Jack Elinson & Bill Boulware; Television Story: C.J. Banks^{[A]} & Bill Boulware	October 26, 1985	16.5/27
Mary (Marla Gibbs) may be faced with eviction when 227’s stingy landlord dies, and her nemesis Sandra (Jackée Harry) is in line to inherit the building. Note: Shortly after the cancelation of The Jeffersons, Marla Gibbs now stars in this show.
7	7	"The Sidewalk Sale"	Tony Singletary	Bob Myer & Bob Young	November 2, 1985	17.3/28
Mary gets caught up in the fervor of a sidewalk sale to help the new landlady Rose part for building repairs. But she sells Lester’s favorite lamp—unaware that he’s stashed the sales proceeds in it.
8	8	"Letter to the President"	Tony Singletary	Sara V. Finney & Vida Spears	November 9, 1985	16.3/26
Mary's friends head for the highway after she implicates them in a letter to the President about a pothole--but they make a quick U-turn when they learn the President is coming to fill in the hole. Guest starring Leslie Nielsen as government agent Bob Gamble.
9	9	"Pity the Poor Working Girl"	Gerren Keith	Dick Bensfield & Perry Grant	November 16, 1985	19.7/31
Mary begins to fret when Sandra--fired from her previous job because of a boss' jealous wife--lands a position at Lester's construction firm.
10	10	"Football Widow"	Arlando Smith	Sara V. Finney & Vida Spears	November 23, 1985	20.1/32
Trying to tackle the loneliness of football widowhood, Mary snags tickets to the big game--but she fumbles her chance to score points with Lester when she insists on going along.
11	11	"A Daughter Is a Precious Thing"	Ellen Chaset Falcon	Bob Myer & Bob Young	November 30, 1985	19.6/31
When Mary can't solve daughter Brenda's boy problems, Brenda enlists the aid of an expert....Mary's nemesis Sandra.
12	12	"The Big Piano Play-Off"	Gerren Keith	Perry Grant & Dick Bensfield	December 7, 1985	17.8/30
When Mary buys a piano, Rose peddles her teaching services to both her and Sandra--and the two pupils' rivalry inspires a competitive recital to determine who's learned more in three weeks. Guest-starring jazz musician Benard Ighner in a cameo appearance.
13	13	"Mary's Christmas"	Gerren Keith	Richard Vaczy & Tracy Gamble	December 14, 1985	18.5/31
When their church loses its lease, Mary coaxes Lester into supervising its move to a new location. But the members are left without a church on Christmas, when the building mysteriously disappears.
14	14	"The Bed of Rose's"	Arlando Smith	Richard Gurman	January 4, 1986	19.8/31
Mary and Sandra offer differing opinions when Rose is asked to spend the weekend in New York with the man of her dreams--who also happens to be one of Sandra's ex-nightmares.
15	15	"Brenda's Last Date"	Tony Singletary	Perry Grant & Dick Bensfield	January 11, 1986	21.8/35
Pearl asks Mary if Lester would have a man-to-man talk with Calvin about sex and Brenda asks her parents if she could go to the dance Friday night. They believe that she is too young to date (14). From Mary's persuading, Lester talks to Calvin and ends his talk with, "If you mess around with my daughter, I'll rip your head off." Scared, Calvin breaks the date anyway and Pearl gives Lester a walloping for threatening her grandson. But Brenda still wants to go and comes up with a plan. Brenda tells her parents that she will go to the library Friday night, while Calvin tells his grandmother that he is going to see Halley's Comet. When Mary finds out, she goes to the dance and takes Brenda home. At home she and Brenda have a heart-to-heart talk, where Mary says she and Lester will relax the rules a little.
16	16	"A Young Man's Fancy"	Gerren Keith	Dick Bensfield & Perry Grant	January 18, 1986	21.4/35
Pearl goes to Baltimore to visit her sister and the Jenkins watch Calvin for her. When he tries out for the romantic lead for a school play and doesn't get it, he becomes depressed. Sandra boosts his confidence and makes him feel better, however, he mistakes her kindness for affection and begins to fall in love with Sandra. When Brenda hears how silly Calvin is acting over Sandra, she goes and talks to him and expresses to him that she cares for him more than Sandra would ever, and she tells him that he is her best friend. Calvin gets over his crush really fast after that.
17	17	"We the People"	Gerren Keith	Story by : Bobby Crawford & Fred Johnson and Ron Bloomberg; Teleplay by : Ron Bloomberg	February 1, 1986	20.4/33
Lester's old boss, Gus (Lou Albano) comes to visit the Jenkins from Hawaii. While there, Rose hires him as the building repairman and lets him live in an efficiency on the third floor. Pearl begins to notice that people go up to visit Gus and never return. She and Mary investigate and find out that Gus is homeless and his homeless friends consisting of Cousin Ray (Teddy Wilson), Senator James (John Finnegan), the Professor (Stephen Tobolowsky), Maggie (Barbara Ann Grimes), Phil, Terry, and Flores are the ones that have come to live with Gus. It turns out his business in Hawaii went belly-up, and Gus lost everything. Mary has sympathy for them and feeds them, while trying to keep the news from Rose, because she would have to put them out based on the housing codes that they are breaking. Lester finds out about an abandoned building that his company will fix-up so the homeless people will have some place to live. This will also give Gus the chance to get back into business again.
18	18	"Redecorating Blues"	Gerren Keith	Robert Drysdale & Sylvia Alan	February 8, 1986	19.4/31
While at a neighborhood watch meeting, the Jenkins get robbed, with Brenda in the kitchen on the phone. When they return from the meeting, they see that the burglars took an arm chair, their television, radio, and lamp. This gives Mary the idea of remodeling their living room. However, Lester has his heart set on buying a sports car. While on a test drive for the sports car, the neighbors and Brenda help set up a surprise for Mary. The living room has been remodeled with everything that Mary had circled in a decorating magazine. Lester decides that the sports car can wait. Guest-starrng Dennis Haysbert
19	19	"Fifty Big Ones"	Gerren Keith	Bill Boulware and Ron Bloomberg	February 15, 1986	19.5/30
At their vows renewal ceremony, Mary's parents are in the middle of the argument and are not talking to each other. Lester talks to his father-in-law, and Mary talks to her mother to encourage them to make up and go through with the ceremony. Meanwhile, Sandra meets a man who turns out to be married, and Rose has a peculiar conversation with another man: it turns out that both her late husband and his late wife both used to vacation in Vermont for one week out of the year, to go "fishing" and "writing poetry," respectively. They both assume that their mates were cheating with each other, until they realize that their mates used to go to separate cities in Vermont.
20	20	"Slam Dunked"	Arlando Smith	Tracy Gamble & Richard Vaczy	February 22, 1986	22.2/37
Sandra begins dating a basketball player who rubs Mary the wrong way from their first meeting. He comes across as rude and arrogant. Calvin idolizes him and mimics his attitude. Brenda doesn't like hanging around the "new" Calvin. When Calvin hears how the Rocketman talks to Sandra in an argument, and hears the Rocketman call him "some dumb kid," he changes his opinion of Rocketman and realizes that he was acting like a jerk.
21	21	"Pick Six"	Gerren Keith	Bobby Crawford & Fred Johnson	March 8, 1986	19.0/32
While reading the newspaper, Rose and Pearl choose 6 numbers related to an article that is in it. However, Mary thinks the lottery's a waste of time and money. But with a big jackpot, Rose & Pearl don't care. Mary preaches to the girls what a waste of time it is, so the girls agreed. Lester buys Mary a scratch off ticket and she wins $10. However, while waiting in line to redeem it, she gets a lottery play slip and gets numbers from the same newspaper article. Sandra spots her and then she know she's in trouble. Rose & Pearl enter Mary's apartment and were mad that after she preached about the evil of playing the lottery, she buys a ticket for herself. So she offers to split any winnings should it be a winning ticket. The Pick 6 is a winning ticket and that not only Mary won, but many people in the 227 apartment building won, as well as much of Washington DC! The big jackpot turns out to be worth $266 & that Mary, Rose & Pearl will each get $88.67!
22	22	"Young Man with a Job"	Ellen Chaset Falcon	Sara V. Finney & Vida Spears	May 3, 1986	17.9/32
When Calvin has a hard time finding a part-time job, Brenda and Pearl persuade Mary to convince Lester to offer Calvin a job working at the construction site. But when Calvin proves to be inept with his hands, he gets terminated. With some helpful advice from Mary, Calvin later lands five interviews.

=== Season 2 (1986–87) ===
No. overall	No. in season	Title	Directed by	Written by	Original release date	Rating/share (households)
23	1	"The Wheel of Misfortune"	Gerren Keith	Richard Vaczy & Tracy Gamble	October 4, 1986	19.3/34
Wheel of Fortune fan Mary decides to audition for the game show on a trip to California, but Sandra has the same idea. When the producers see that Mary and Sandra are both from DC, they wind up competing against each other. Pat Sajak, Vanna White, and Jack Clark guest stars.
24	2	"Mary Nightingale"	Gerren Keith	Perry Grant & Dick Bensfield	October 11, 1986	18.9/32
Lester comes home from work sick, with the assumption that he has the flu. Using a bell that Sandra gives him, he drives Mary crazy with his demands for "water" and "celery salt" for his soup. She just assumes that he is being a big baby. Asking Brenda to watch Lester for a little while, Mary goes shopping and gets a pedicure and manicure (something she was not able to do earlier with Pearl and Rose). When she returns, Lester is being carried into an ambulance because he has appendicitis and needs to go to the hospital. Mary is worried to death because she can't see Lester in the operating room, so she sneaks in. The operation is OK.
25	3	"Washington Affair"	Gerren Keith	Ron Bloomberg & Bill Boulware	November 1, 1986	18.0/31
Mary invites Sandra and her date, an eligible Congressman, to a dinner at her apartment for Brenda's teacher (Jayne Kennedy) who is attracted to the legislator and competition for Sandra. Guest-starring Billy Dee Williams.
26	4	"The Great Manhunt"	Gerren Keith	Tracy Gamble & Richard Vaczy	November 8, 1986	20.4/35
After Sandra sees her neighbors (a married couple) interact with each other and with their daughter, Sandra decides that she wants a husband and a child. She goes out on a series of dates, which end in disaster because of Sandra's openness about wanting to be married and have a child. She finally decides that since she can't find a suitable husband that she'll just get artificially inseminated. Mary and Rose try talk her out of it. But nothing is more of a rude awakening than when Sandra witnesses Cathy going into labor and she sees how Jim was there for her every step of the way. Then Mary and Lester talk about the night Brenda was born and how they really needed each other then. Sandra changes her mind and decides that when she does have a baby she would like to be married so she can have a husband that loves her and loves their child.
27	5	"Temptations"	Arlando Smith	Dick Bensfield & Jack Elinson	November 15, 1986	19.3/33
Mary is in charge of the church's charity show and it's like divine providence when The Temptations show up at her door.
28	6	"Pillow Talk"	Gerren Keith	Ron Bloomberg	November 22, 1986	20.3/33
When Sandra sees a pillow that Mary is making for Brenda, she is impressed. She tells Mary that they could go into business and make lots of money. So Mary agrees to a 50/50 deal with Sandra. Eventually, things become too overwhelming for Mary as she is the one doing all the work and Sandra is the one eating expensive lunches and arranging buyers. Mary insists that she go on the next business lunch with Sandra, and the buyer requests 10,000 pillows for his stores. Mary admits to him that they are a small company and they make a deal, with him as a third partner, to build a factory. He decides to build the factory in Taiwan, minus Sandra and Mary. In the end, Sandra ends up owing Mary money because she spent all of the profits.
29	7	"Come Into My Parlor"	Gerren Keith	Dick Bensfield & Perry Grant	November 29, 1986	18.6/31
When Brenda meets a cute boy she decides to invite him to her party Saturday night. After getting permission to actually have the party, she then hears Sandra tell a story about how when she was young and wanted to get to know a boy better, she would "mistakenly" tell him the wrong day of the party. Brenda tries the idea and invites Ken over for Friday night instead, hoping that when he gets there he will meet her parents and stay for dinner. But Mary and Lester decide to go out to eat and are not home when Ken arrives. Brenda decides to let him come in anyway, just to have a drink, but then Calvin shows up to drop off chairs for the party. When she tells them they need to leave, Mary and Lester arrive home and the boys hide. Mary and Lester eventually catch the boys in the house.
30	8	"Father's Day"	Arlando Smith	Bill Boulware & Jack Elinson	December 6, 1986	17.0/29
Calvin's dad (Rick Fitts) comes to visit D.C. He and Calvin have fun going to basketball games and going to see the Blue Angels fly. Because he and his grandma have been arguing a lot lately, Calvin makes the decision to live with his dad in Iceland, thinking it would be more fun than living in D.C. Pearl is sad about it but doesn't want to show it too much. Mary throws Calvin a going away party, and after he hears what nice things every one has to say about him, he realizes that he has more "family" than he thought and decides to stay in D.C.
31	9	"Author, Author"	Gerren Keith	C.M. Leon & Margaret Weisman	December 13, 1986	17.7/30
Sandra is writing a romance novel whose characters resemble the residents of 227: Marie, Rosita, and Pearlie Mae. With Mary up against Emma Johnson for the presidency of the Ladies' Auxiliary, she becomes nervous when Emma receives a copy of Sandra's book. She and the Rev. come to the Jenkins' home, intending to use the manuscript to ruin Mary's chances when Sandra drops by and gives Emma the newest chapter of her book. Upon reading it, however, a shocked Emma changes her mind about blabbing to the Rev. and resigns from the running for president, thereby making Mary president by default. When Mary asks Sandra what was in the latest chapter, Sandra tells her to read it, which reveals she has added a new character named Emmaline, based on Emma, who turns out to be a church-going lady, but also a hooker by night.
32	10	"Matchmakers"	Gerren Keith	Al Gordon & Ron Bloomberg	January 3, 1987	18.4/29
Rose tries a video-dating service, but wonders if she can live up to the image Sandra creates for her.
33	11	"The Handwriting on the Wall"	Gerren Keith	Perry Grant & Dick Bensfield	January 10, 1987	20.2/32
When Mary and Rose come home from the movie theater, they see a boy named JoJo Herman (Larron Tate) spray-painting his gang tag underneath Pearl's window. Pearl hits him with her pillow, Rose grabs the spray can and accidentally sprays his shirt, and Mary grabs hims, but tries to talk sense into him. JoJo tells his mother (Jo Marie Payton) everything that happened, while leaving out the part about him spray painting on the building. They decide to sue the ladies and use Sandra as a witness who was in the car on a date with a man named Renaldo (Rodney Saulsberry). When they get in court, Mrs. Herman and Judge Hollingsworth (Al Fann) eventually find out the truth. The ladies are fined 10 cents while JoJo is made to clean off the graffiti. Mrs. Herman apologizes to the ladies.
34	12	"A Matter of Choice"	Gerren Keith	Bill Boulware & Ron Bloomberg	January 17, 1987	20.0/32
Lester has misgivings about the lucrative contract he's landed; the bank he's working for has financial ties to South Africa.
35	13	"Got a Job"	Gerren Keith	Bobby Crawford & Fred Johnson	January 24, 1987	20.7/34
When Sandra uses her feminine wiles to get Brenda a part-time job at Billy Bob's Burgers, Brenda's parents are divided on the issue: Mary wants Brenda to study full-time, while Lester is delighted at her new sense of responsibility.
36	14	"Far From the Tree"	Edmund J. Cambridge and Arlando Smith	Billi Gordon	February 7, 1987	19.7/34
Sandra is very upset when she learns that her mother (Della Reese) is coming to visit. She feels as though her mother doesn't love her because she is so different from her "normal" siblings and family members. Sandra changes her appearance to look "dull" because she thinks that is what her mother will approve of. That same weekend, a male friend of hers also comes to visit. Sandra and Mary try to keep the two from meeting. Finally Sandra admits to her mother that she thinks her mother does not love her. Her mom admits that she was just like Sandra before she got married, but calmed down so she could fit in with Sandra's father (who is a minister) and that she loves Sandra just the same because there is never a dull moment with Sandra around. Mop and her mother end up meeting anyway, and they all go dancing. Guest-starring Bruce A. Young
37	15	"Toyland"	Gerren Keith	Tracy Gamble & Richard Vaczy	February 14, 1987	18.8/31
Mary and Lester go to a toy store to purchase toys for kids in the hospital. When they get there, the guy (Terry Kiser) lets them in even though the sign on the door says closed. The Jenkins discover that he is attempting to rob the place. Pee-wee Herman (Paul Reubens) comes into the store to purchase some things, so he is taken "hostage" along with Mary and Lester. Later on, Sandra comes and she is also escorted to the back of the store. The entire gang is tied up. They think of ways to escape. Their plan for Sandra to entice the robber changes courses a little when Pee Wee actually saves the day by throwing bubble solution into his eyes.
38	16	"The Audit"	Gerren Keith	Ron Bloomberg	February 21, 1987	19.6/34
The IRS audits Mary and Lester. At a diner, Mary gets into an argument with a man (Ron Glass) whose views on women are old-fashioned and clash with Mary's views. She goes as far as to insult his mother. When she and Lester are finally let in to see the auditor, it's the man Mary insulted! She knows that she and Lester are in deep trouble. Mr. Stone doubts the validity of their receipts and Lester is upset. Sandra bursts into the room because she has a date with Mr. Stone and wants to know what's keeping him. She verifies that a questionable dinner party was truly a party for Lester's investors and employees. Mr. Stone lets them go. Red Buttons and David Leisure also appear in this episode.
39	17	"A Good Citizen"	Whitney J. LeBlanc	Bill Boulware & Al Gordon	February 28, 1987	20.3/34
When Sandra comes to show the ladies the new ring that her boyfriend gave her, Mary notices an article in the newspaper that mentions a robbery at the same jewelry store where Sandra and her beau first admired the ring. Mary suggests that Sandra contact the police. The police put a bug in one of Sandra's earrings so they can record her conversation with her boyfriend. While he is there, he shows Sandra some bracelets and necklaces. Just then, the police come into her apartment, but Justin gets away. Sandra is afraid that he may come back, so she asks her friends to keep her company and sleeps on the Jenkins' couch. The next day when she returns to her apartment fearless, Justin returns with all the ladies there, but the police come in and arrest Justin. They reveal that they were surveilling Sandra's apartment.
40	18	"Happy Twentieth"	Arlando Smith	Reynaldo Rey & J. Stanford Parker	March 7, 1987	18.0/31
When Lester decides to rent a hotel room for the weekend, Mary plans a cruise, and the ladies plan a surprise party for Mary and Lester's anniversary, it's all Brenda can take to keep it a secret. She decides to tell them what the other's are planning for the weekend and they all agree to the party. When Lester and Mary's parents arrive they argue about everything. Lester ends up getting sick and the party ends up being cancelled. Lester and Mary decide to take a cruise later on to celebrate the anniversary.
41	19	"The Fourth Time Around"	Gerren Keith	Richard Vaczy & Tracy Gamble	March 21, 1987	18.6/32
When Lester goes to watch the game at a friend's house, Mary and the ladies decide to have a girl's night out. They go to a club/bar where Pearl meets a man. They hit it off. When Pearl comes home, she tells Mary that she and Felix are engaged. Mary seems to be the only one concerned about it, while Rose and Sandra want to throw her a bridal shower. Mary thinks that he is after Pearl's money. Pearl doesn't care what Mary thinks, and she and Felix get married any way. When she returns from her honeymoon, Mary apologizes, but Pearl has bad news. Felix died. She admits to Mary that they knew that he was dying. Because she loved him and didn't want him to be lonely, they married so soon.
42	20	"Rich Kid"	Oz Scott	Story by : Marla Gibbs; Teleplay by : Reynaldo Rey & J. Stanford Parker	April 11, 1987	16.4/28
Calvin befriends a new kid named Ron who says that his money comes from his rich uncle. He buys Calvin a new pair of shoes and offers to take Calvin and Brenda to a Stevie Wonder concert. Mary doesn't like the way Ron is "trying to buy friends." For $50, Ron gets Calvin to give someone a sealed package and in return he receives $1000 to give back to Ron. Once Pearl and Mary find out, they conclude that Ron is a drug dealer. Mary goes to talk to Ron's mother (Veronica Redd) about his free spending and the fact that he is a drug dealer, but his mother refuses to believe Mary. Calvin confronts Ron about using him to deliver drugs and Ron admits that he used Calvin and all it cost him was a pair of shoes. Later that day at a community meeting concerning the spread of drugs around the neighborhood, Ron's mother shows up and tells the 227 residents that Ron was stabbed to death in a drug deal gone bad.
43	21	"The Working Game"	Whitney J. LeBlanc	Ron Bloomberg & Al Gordon	May 23, 1987	13.4/27
Upset when Brenda comes home from University Day wanting to attend Northwestern, Mary anticipates an empty nest by demanding that Lester give her a job at the construction site—and gets fired on her first day. Mary takes a job at a travel agency with Sandra where her boss finds her so invaluable that he wants her to accompany him on a trip. The boss comes on to Sandra, who then quits and tells Mary not to go on the trip. She goes anyway, and Sandra then tells Lester about their boss. He surprises Mary in Philadelphia and jumps to the wrong conclusions when he finds a man's suit and bathrobe in Mary's closet. He finds out that Mary bought them for him as a surprise.
44	22	"Check Snub"	Gerren Keith	Bobby Crawford & Fred Johnson	May 30, 1987	12.7/27
The Social Security office says that Pearl is dead and the resulting protest lands Pearl, Mary, and Rose in jail. The press is called and when the Social Security office decides to drop the charges to avoid negative publicity, the girls refuse to leave their jail cell and Sandra has now joined them.

=== Season 3 (1987–88) ===
No. overall	No. in season	Title	Directed by	Written by	Original release date	Rating/share (households)
45	1	"Men's Club"	Gerren Keith	Christine Houston	September 26, 1987	17.3/22
When The Owls Men's Club is giving Lester an award, Mary is excited until she finds out that women are not allowed in the club. Mary decides to dress up like a man (and Sandra has the same idea) and go to the ceremony. After Lester gives his speech, Mary (still disguised as a man) runs up and kisses Lester. That's when she reveals who she is. Before she is escorted out, she gives a speech that says they should allow women into the club on special occasions like that one. They vote and agree on it. Guest-starring Nipsey Russell and Roscoe Lee Browne.
46	2	"Low Noon"	Gerren Keith	Jack Elinson & Dick Bensfield	October 3, 1987	17.6/32
When Sandra is dating a man who wants to open a sleazy nightclub down the street, Mary starts a petition to keep it from opening. Meanwhile, Brenda is working on an assignment about black cowboys. While reading about the historical figures, Mary dreams that they all live in the old West. Mary is "2-Gun Mary," the fastest gun in the West. Lester is the marshal and Brenda-Sue is his daughter. Rose is a schoolmarm turned cocktail dancer, Pearl is a dancer, and Sandra owns the saloon. When bad-guy Jessie comes into town, the town bands together to defeat him (which is what Mary would like to do in reality). When she awakens from her dream, she finds out that the petitions were successful and the club will not open.
47	3	"There Goes the Building"	Gerren Keith	Richard Vaczy & Tracy Gamble	October 17, 1987	16.6/29
Sandra introduces her boyfriend to the ladies, the same man that audited the Jenkins. Mary still does not like him, however he charms everyone and eventually wins Mary over. Rose decides to sell 227 to him because he is efficient with his building (across the street) and he handles some of the 227's problems. The next day, a man shows up saying that he is going to demolish 227, but the only one who sees him is Mary. She blames Mr. Stone (Ron Glass) and tells the other residents. When Rose confronts Mr. Stone, he calls the deal off before Rose can say anything about the demolition, but Mr. Stone sends a building inspector around to persuade Rose to sell again. When Rose agrees to sell, all of the tenants meet in the basement, Mary and Sandra both sign the contract as witnesses, and Mr. Stone admits his true intentions to demolish 227 and build expensive high rise condos. The contract ends up being void because Mary did not sign her actual name, but instead signed as "Daffy Duck." Rose remains the landlord at 227.
48	4	"And Baby Makes Three"	Gerren Keith	Story by : Mike Lyons & Kimberley Wells; Teleplay by : Peter Gallay	October 24, 1987	17.5/32
When Mary is concerned at Calvin and Brenda's nonchalance about teenage pregnancy, she designs an experiment with their sex education class where the kids must take care of an animal. Brenda and Calvin "adopt" a piglet named Alberta and she is a handful. All of the kids in the class realize how hard it is to take care of animals, let alone a baby.
49	5	"Bull's Eye"	Gerren Keith	Story by : Dorian Gibbs & Ken Whittingham; Teleplay by : J. Stanford Parker and Peter Gallay	October 31, 1987	13.3/25
A man with a knife rents an apartment. Because of his suspicious behavior, everyone thinks he's a killer. But it turns out that he's actually writing a novel.
50	6	"Teach Me Tonight: Part 1"	Gerren Keith	Ron Bloomberg & Peter Gallay	November 7, 1987	17.5/31
When Sandra meets Brenda's math teacher at the Jenkins' apartment, they begin dating and he gets more serious than Sandra. Then, Sandra comes by the Jenkins' with her new rich date, while Mitchell is visiting. To get Sandra back, he spends all his money trying to wine and dine her. One night at the Piano Bar he announces that he is going to begin working as a computer executive, thereby making more money. Mary talks to Sandra and says that Mitchell loves being a teacher and is only giving it up for Sandra and to make more money. He and Sandra talk and the show closes with Sandra announcing their engagement.
51	7	"Teach Me Tonight: Part 2"	Gerren Keith	Bill Boulware & Al Gordon	November 14, 1987	18.7/33
Continuing from the last episode, Sandra overhears Mitchell's conversation with his student and she tells him that he needs to continue teaching because he needs the kids as much as they need him. Sandra and Mitchell told the Jenkins separately that they are not ready to get married. When the minister asks if anyone objects, they both raise their hands. They decide that they are not ready to get married and need more time to decide whether or not they are ready to get married. Meanwhile, the ladies try to teach Sandra how to cook.
52	8	"See You in Court"	Gerren Keith	Story by : Al Gordon; Teleplay by : Bill Boulware & Al Gordon	November 21, 1987	17.5/30
Brenda wants Mary to submit a song she had written in high school into a writing contest. She does so, after adding Sandra's put-in. When Mary wins the contest she and Sandra go to court over the song royalties. Sandra has it in with the judge so Mary calls in Mary Wilson of The Supremes to perform her version of the song without Sandra's lines. The judge finds both versions of the song pleasing and tells the two ladies to form a truce. Guest-starring Mary Wilson, John Houseman, and Ted Ross.
53	9	"The Honeymoon's Over"	Whitney J. LeBlanc	Ronald Rubin	November 28, 1987	18.9/33
When Lester's cousin, Ed and his wife, Sherry come to visit the Jenkins, Mary brags about how they are the perfect couple who never argue and still behave like Honeymooners after five years of marriage. When they arrive, Sherry reveals to Mary that Ed is stifling her and is too overprotective and she says that she is going to leave him that night. Once Ed finds out that she left, he becomes depressed and there is nothing that the Jenkins or residents of 227 can do to cheer him up. Sherry decides to come back and Mary coaches Ed on what to say, and tells him that he should change; he should be less overprotective. Sherry takes him back (or rather they take each other back). Guest-starring Brian Stokes Mitchell and Vanessa Bell Calloway.
54	10	"Rapture"	Gerren Keith	Bobby Crawford & Fred Johnson	December 5, 1987	18.0/32
Calvin and his friend Eddie are in danger of failing history, so the Jenkins, Rose, and Pearl try to tutor them. After failing the test the first time, they get a second chance to take the test. After Brenda returns from a rap concert, Mary gets the idea that maybe they should study in rap form, since they seem to know so many rap lyrics. They do and they pass the test a second time.
55	11	"The Facade"	Gerren Keith	Bobby Crawford & Fred Johnson	December 12, 1987	15.7/28
When Mary goes to a seminar about success, she meets a business man who wants to build a $50 million museum. She tells him that Lester is a big time contractor and sets up a meeting date. She uses Sandra's boyfriend's penthouse across the street to prove to Mr. Mortimer that she and Lester have lots of money. When Sandra's boyfriend comes home early, Mary's plan begins to fall apart. She admits what was going on to Mr. Mortimer and his wife. They understand, because Mrs. Mortimer says she, too, would do almost anything to aid in her husband's success. They end up using Lester's company for a smaller project.
56	12	"The Talk Show"	Gerren Keith	Mickey Rose	January 2, 1988	18.8/31
Sandra gets a job on a low budget television station, Channel 87. She tried out for the weather girl, but bombed! So the station manager (Flip Wilson) gives her another chance hosting her own talk show. Mary, Lester, Rose, and Pearl agree to be on the show and talk about various things (bake sale, rummage). But the station manager wants "Sex In The 80's" as a topic, which makes them feel uncomfortable (except Pearl).
57	13	"Snowbound"	Gerren Keith	David Garber & Bruce E. Kalish	January 9, 1988	18.5/28
When Mary and Lester's flight to Hawaii is cancelled due to the blizzard, they go home only to find Rose, Pearl, Sandra and Calvin in their apartment, which is one of two apartments in 227 with working heat. They all stay there, including the Jenkins' cab driver, whose cab was stuck in the snow, for at least two days before everyone starts to get on everyone else's nerves. When they realize how they were acting, and that Mary and Lester had to put up with their attitudes in addition to missing their flight, they decide to recreate Hawaii in the apartment for Mary and Lester. Guest-starring Ted Lange
58	14	"Shall We Dance?"	Gerren Keith	Story by : Al Gordon; Teleplay by : Bill Boulware & Al Gordon	January 16, 1988	16.7/28
Sandra is hosting a dance and needs an equal number of men and women to attend. She fixes Rose up with a date, Ray the mail man, but he breaks his leg and can't go. Mary convinces Lester to go with Rose so he does, but when Mary goes down the dance she catches Lester dancing with his old girlfriend (Denise Nicholas) instead. The girlfriend turns out to be Ray's ex-wife.
59	15	"The Sing-Off"	Gerren Keith	Al Gordon & Peter Gallay	January 23, 1988	15.8/27
For a choir sing-off, Mary has found housing for all of the competitors except a local deacon (Paul Winfield) and for good reason. He is rude, pushy and impatient. The deacon winds up staying with the Jenkins. He tries everything he can to guarantee that his choir will win, including taking the judges to dinner and bringing in a professional gospel singer. The D.C. choir brings in Brenda, Tiffany, and friends to sing with their choir, which gives them a unique, youthful sound. The competition ends in a tie, where both teams will represent the East Coast in the California semi-finals.: Note #1: This episode marks Kia Goodwin's final appearance as Tiffany.; Note #2: Paul Winfield guest-starred in this episode before becoming a series regular as Julian c. Barlow in season five.
60	16	"Sweet Sixteen"	Gerren Keith	David Garber & Bruce E. Kalish	January 30, 1988	16.6/27
When Calvin asks Brenda to his basketball ball, she is not able to go because she is still one week away from being 16 years old. She sulks because she can't go. The next week, she has a sweet sixteen party and when Sandra asks what she will do now that she is 16, she announces that she is going to go on her first date, and NOT with Calvin. This shocks her parents and Calvin. When the Jenkins meet her date they drill him before finally allowing them to leave. Around 11 o'clock, the Jenkins go outside the building to spy on Brenda and Durell. Brenda tells him that she is not ready to kiss him. Calvin, who was hiding by the garbage cans, asks her out for next Friday night.
61	17	"The Roommate"	Oz Scott	Ilunga Adell & J. Stanford Parker	February 6, 1988	17.3/28
When the daughter of Lester's friend Fred Dalton (Terry Carter) named Donna Dalton (Kim Fields) comes to stay with the Jenkins until the dorms at Howard University open, she gets a taste of the big city first hand. Sandra is behind on rent for three months and she decides to get a roommate. Sweet, shy, quiet Donna becomes her roommate after the dorm overbooked. She takes a lesson from Sandra and begins dressing, walking, talking, and acting like her. Donna steals Sandra's boyfriend and when Mary talks to her about the new Donna, she gets upset and leaves. Then her parents Fred and Ida (Sheila Frazier) show up to check on their "baby." Mary stalls until finally Donna comes back. They talk privately and Donna apologizes and admits that she was not ready for "life in the fast lane."
62	18	"The Big Deal"	Gerren Keith	Al Gordon & Bill Boulware	February 13, 1988	17.6/29
Lester's construction company has the chance to be purchased by a multi-national company. Thurmond Fox (special guest star Sherman Hemsley), the lawyer that is over the proposed merger subleases the apartment and next door, and he and Mary start off on the wrong foot from the beginning. He requests tickets to see the Pointer Sisters, makes Mary cook a steak, (after she'd already made fish) mistakes her for the maid and tells her to clean his apartment for $3.00 an hour. When Mary can't get tickets, she, Rose and Sandra dress up as the Pointer Sisters and host a party for Thurmond. Lester decides that he does not want to sell.
63	19	"The New Neighbors"	Gerren Keith	Peter Gallay & David Garber & Bruce E. Kalish	February 20, 1988	14.2/23
When Rose is looking for a live-in superintendent, Manny suggests his father (Alfonso Arau), knowing that the Super's family will live with a 50% decrease in rent. When his family moves in, they later find out that he is also the Superintendent, but Alfonso has no skills in that area. Instead, he would rather play concert violin in a symphony. When a try-out conflicts with his job as Super, he decides to complete his job as Super, but Rose allows him one more day to complete his job so he can try out for the Orchestra. He doesn't make it, but vows to put his all into being the Super. Guest-starring Yvonne Wilder.
64	20	"Blues"	Gerren Keith	Ron Bloomberg	February 27, 1988	15.3/24
Brenda's grandfather arrives with a Wailing Eddie record in tow. While letting Brenda listen to it, she accidentally scratches it and her grandfather is devastated. She doesn't understand what's so special about the blues anyway. Mary and Lester find another rare copy, and it too is ruined accidentally by Brenda. This episode is cut with scenes of Sandra and Rose singing the blues and narrated by Brenda. Towards the end of the episode, she finally understands what the blues is all about, because she has them. Her grandfather is upset with her and everyone is coming down hard on her about the broken record. She and her grandfather reconcile and Pearl gets Wailing Eddie to come to the Jenkins' and sing.
65	21	"The Butler Did It"	Gerren Keith	Mike Marmer	March 12, 1988	14.4/25
Mary and Rose win a raffle contest and its owner Darren Montagne (Phil Morris) tells them that their prize is a butler named Alfred (Franklin Cover) for a week. They both become quickly annoyed with his presence and "loan" him to Sandra. When it is time for him to go home, his boss Jonathan Forsythe (Brian George) comes over to the Jenkins and fires him. With nowhere to go, Alfred fakes a back ache and has the Jenkins waiting on him hand and foot. Jonathan later comes back and wants to take him back. He admits to Mary that it's only because it was in his father's will that he must continue to employ Alfred in order to receive money.
66	22	"My Aching Back"	Gerren Keith	Al Gordon & Peter Gallay	April 9, 1988	11.3/23
When a movie is being shot outside 227, Sandra asks the director if there is any role not yet filled. He gives her a line to say ("Officer, he went that way"), but she cannot say it as naturally as Mary, so he recasts Mary in the role. Sandra is upset. Mary is so nervous, she practices the line day and night until finally she becomes so stressed that her back goes out. Rose brings a chiropractor (James Avery) to her house to relieve her stress and straighten her up (she was bent over before). When it comes time to say her line she does it well. Sandra winds up with a role after all....the dead homeless person on the apartment steps.
67	23	"Country Cousins"	Edmund J. Cambridge	Ilunga Adell	April 30, 1988	14.7/28
Lester is informed that he has an inheritance coming to him. But before he can collect it, he has to live with some distant relatives and discovers that they are country folk and white.
68	24	"Best Friends"	Bob Lally	Kathleen McGhee-Anderson & Deborrah M. Wilkinson	May 7, 1988	14.7/30
When Mary's high school friend (Roxie Roker) comes to visit, everyone is excited to meet her because she is a famous writer, psychologist, and romance adviser (like Dr. Ruth). Mary imagines what it would be like to be that famous and well liked. She begins to get jealous when Brenda tells her that she wants to be like Dr. Butler. She tells Lester how she feels and he admits that he thinks Thelma may be jealous of Mary and her stable life. Mary and Thelma get in an argument about who is jealous of whom and they bring up a lot of things that happened in the past. They wind up laughing about how silly they were acting and make up.

=== Season 4 (1988–89) ===
No. overall	No. in season	Title	Directed by	Written by	Original release date	U.S. viewers (millions)	Rating/share (households)
69	1	"The Whiz Kid"	Gerren Keith	Ron Bloomberg & Al Gordon	October 8, 1988	21.4	14.7/27
Mary is the director for the church production of "The Wiz" and her cast is edgy. Meanwhile, the Jenkins' have a house guest. A college student who will be staying with them for a year. They are all surprised when 11-year-old Alexandria shows up. She gets on everyone's nerves with her know-it-all attitude. She reveals to Mary that she wants everyone to like her and she thinks that no one does at that moment. Mary tells her to just be herself, even if it means acting her age. Note: First appearance by Countess Vaughn as Alexandria DeWitt.
70	2	"Hide the Star"	Gerren Keith	Peter Gallay	October 22, 1988	20.0	13.7/25
Lester's business partner is Marvelous Marvin Hagler, but it must remain a secret. When Rose and Pearl see Mary acting so suspicious, they decide to find out what is going on. They discover that Marvin is staying with the Jenkins and then the word gets out around town. Visitors swarm the Jenkins' apartment for an autograph and eventually Marvin decides to leave, but there are no hard feelings between him and Lester.
71	3	"A Funny Thing Happened on the Way to the Pageant"	Tony Singletary	Jeff Abugov	October 29, 1988	19.6	13.4/25
Sandra is the PR director for the Miss Teen Washington Pageant and she encourages Mary to let Brenda enter. After Mary checks everything out, she allows Brenda to enter. But then next day, the head of the pageant adds a new competition that Mary disapproves of: Bikini Aerobics. She goes down to talk to Justin and he says that he can't get rid of that portion of the show or the cable company won't air it. When she and Brenda go backstage, they find out that the other girls feel as though that portion of the show is embarrassing and degrading. They decide to boycott, with the help of Bert Parks (the host) and Sandra, who feel as though she has been cheated by Justin. Sandra, Mary, Pearl and Rose are "the teens" who are in the pageant, and when the time arrives for the bikini competition, the cable guy and Justin tear the contract up, saying that they didn't want to see a senior citizen in a bikini! They go on with "Plan B" which is where the teens actually come out on stage for the evening gown competition.
72	4	"Double Your Pleasure"	Gerren Keith	Al Gordon & Peter Gallay	November 5, 1988	21.9	14.3/25
Sandra's cousin Conchita (Jackée starred in a dual role) comes to visit, and her fiancée follows her to America. Conchita does not want to marry Carlos in an arranged marriage so she asks Sandra to tell him for her. The two go back and forth with whether or not they want to marry each other, until finally Conchita realizes that she does love Carlos and they decide to get married.
73	5	"Brother From a Sister City"	Gerren Keith	Story by : Marla Gibbs & Dorian Gibbs; Teleplay by : Peter Gallay & Larry Spencer	November 12, 1988	22.6	14.9/26
Brenda is a track star and her coach comes over to the Jenkins' for a cup of coffee and brings a friend of his—Willie Amakye from Ghana. Willie needs to raise money to stay in America and train for the Olympics so Mary suggests a neighborhood marathon. He even gets his friend Florence Griffith Joyner to participate. Mary solicits all of the sponsors, but when Brenda loses a track race, she loses her confidence also. She decides not to run and Flo Jo tries to convince her that you can't give up because of one loss. When the snow causes all runners to quit, Willie continues running because he says he has to raise the money. When Brenda sees his determination, she decides to run alongside him. Also guest-starring Willie Amakye.
74	6	"And the Survey Says…"	Gerren Keith	Ilunga Adell & Fred Johnson	November 19, 1988	23.4	15.3/26
Mary is a star player of Family Feud in her house. She decides to try out for the show when it visits Washington D.C. Sandra also decides to try out, and when she and Mary argue during the interview, the producers decide to have the ladies compete against each other. Mary and Sandra pick teams, and Sandra's team wins on the show. But, in the final round, the team only makes 199 points—one point away from winning the jackpot. Sandra decides to split the money they won (almost $1,000) among everyone on both teams. Guest-starring Ray Combs and Gene Wood.
75	7	"A Yen for Lester"	Gerren Keith	Arnie Wess & Dave DiGregorio	November 26, 1988	24.3	15.6/28
Lester and Raymond decide to buy a Japanese Restaurant together. Pearl and Rose each put in $500 and receive a stock of the restaurant. When the deal is sealed, the kitchen staff all quit, right before a Japanese tour group arrive to eat. They all hustle to try to serve them but it is a disaster as Pearl cannot cook (or understand) Japanese food and the ladies are horrible waitresses. The head chef (John Fujioka) returns and decides to buy the restaurant from Lester and Raymond at the same price they bought it for.
76	8	"Looking Back"	Gerren Keith	Dick Bensfield	December 3, 1988	23.3	14.7/26
When Mary throws pictures of Sandra, Rose and Pearl away in this clip show, they each find them and reminisce over the past three years.
77	9	"The Night They Arrested Santa Claus"	Gerren Keith	Jeff Abugov	December 10, 1988	23.6	15.4/28
Alexandria doesn't celebrate Christmas so everyone tries to get her to feel the spirit of the holiday. Sandra meets a Street Santa (Reginald VelJohnson) and brings him upstairs to meet Alexandria. But when everyone leaves the room, he steals all of their presents. Mary, Lester, Sandra, Rose and Pearl each decide separately to dress up as Santa and bring gifts to make Alexandria think that Santa had a change of heart. However, since the police are looking for Santa thieves, they all end up in jail as suspects. Brenda, Calvin, and Alexandria come to the precinct to get them all out and the real Santa thief is caught. He still has their presents. When the guard is told that another guard let them out before he could do the job, the guard states that he's the only guard working tonight. Alexandria realizes how far everyone went to get her into the holiday spirit and she appreciates while the others assume that the guard that let them out is a form of Santa Claus.
78	10	"The Real Decoys"	Mikki Capparelli	Al Gordon & Bill Boulware	January 7, 1989	24.7	16.5/28
Sandra gets a job as a meter maid. When Pearl gets her purse snatched while on her way to the bank with Mary and Rose's dues, Sandra and Mary hatch up an idea to stage a stake-out in the park. Rose and Mary pose as elderly women. They become suspicious when a skater (Cuba Gooding, Jr.) continues to skate past them and suspect that he is the mugger. An older man comes and sits on the bench with Mary and Rose. He eventually snatches their purses and the skater, who is an undercover cop tries to handcuff him. Sandra decides to be the hero when she jumps in, but she handcuffs the skater instead and the mugger gets away. When they get home, Pearl realizes that the dues money wasn't in her purse but pinned inside another bra.
79	11	"Play It Again, Stan"	Gerren Keith	Bill Boulware & Al Gordon	January 14, 1989	23.0	15.6/28
When Mary and Lester are on their way to the airport their tickets are stolen by a pick pocket who is running from the cops. As Lester and the police officer go after the man, Mary waits in the cab and imagines their lives as the movie Casablanca. In the end, Lester gets the tickets back and they go off to the airport. Guest-starring Billy Dee Williams, Paul Williams, and Johnny Brown. Tim Reid makes an uncredited cameo, referencing his then cancelled CBS TV series Frank's Place. Note: Tim Reid and Jackée Harry will later go on to appear on the sitcom Sister, Sister from 1994 to 1999.
80	12	"A Class Act"	Gerren Keith	Larry Spencer & John Boni	January 28, 1989	21.2	14.0/25
When Mary and Lester go to parents' night at Brenda's school, Mary does not like the playfulness of her history teacher Dylan McMillan (Barry Sobel) or the fact that he does not give tests or homework. She asks the principal to monitor his class, but the principal fires him. When Brenda finds out that Mary was the "loud-mouth" parent that squealed, she is mad at Mary, but also feels sorry for Dylan, who she says is a good teacher. Meanwhile, Sandra is a sales representative for Luscious Lingerie, and when her door-to-door sales are not profitable, she asks Mary if she can host a lingerie party at her apartment. Mary agrees, but only if Dylan can assist her, to make some money for himself. The party is successful, but Dylan says his heart is with teaching. When she finds out that Brenda and Calvin remember what Dylan's teaching them, she talks to the principal to get his job back. Dylan winds up moving into 227. Note: First appearance of Barry Sobel as Dylan McMillan
81	13	"The Prince"	Gerren Keith	Ilunga Adell & Fred Johnson	February 4, 1989	25.8	16.2/27
Sandra asks Rose to take her place on a blind date. Little does she know that her blind date is a prince named Prince Lionel (Morris Day). The ladies each take turns trying to impress him, but it's Brenda who catches the attention of Prince Lionel. She agrees to marry him, thinking that maybe her parents won't think that her proposed trip to Europe that summer isn't so bad after all. The Jenkins decide to let her go through with the plan, but instead Calvin will be in a masked costume. They were thinking that Brenda will stop the ceremony before it's complete. But Brenda hears that plan and also decides not to stop the ceremony. Prince Lionel finds out about the plan to have Calvin pose as Prince Lionel and has his chauffeur grabs Calvin while the Prince Lionel takes his place in the ceremony. After the ceremony is complete, everyone finds out that Brenda actually married Prince Lionel. The Jenkins are furious and so is Brenda. She apologizes for saying that she'd marry him just to make her parents mad, and they get a divorce by doing a reverse version of the ceremony.
82	14	"Babes in the Woods"	Gerren Keith	Peter Gallay	February 11, 1989	23.8	15.6/27
Mary goes on a hike with the Buttercups, the group of young girls (like the Girl Scouts) that Alexandria wants to join. Sandra comes along also, thinking that the handsome leader would be there. They all get lost and decide to stay in a cabin until the next day. Brenda and Lester hear on the radio that a woman escaped from a mental institution and is on the loose in the park. The ladies later hear the same message. When the ladies meet Ranger Granger they assume she is the escaped lunatic disguised as a ranger. When she is sleeping, they tie her up. That's when the real lunatic showed up. The ladies wind up tying Lucinda Merkle up, and the police take her back to the asylum.
83	15	"A Date to Remember"	Gerren Keith	Story by : Robin Green; Teleplay by : Bill Boulware & Al Gordon	February 18, 1989	24.6	16.0/27
When Sandra goes on the Love Connection hosted by Chuck Woolery, she chooses Gary (T. K. Carter) because he is the owner of a jewelry store. When he arrives, Mary is in Sandra's apartment to greet him, because Sandra has gotten Mary's phone glued to her fingernail. They decide not to eat out, and Gary says that he will cook for Sandra. The problem is, Sandra doesn't have any food in her apartment, so she goes to the Jenkins' to "borrow" food. While in the kitchen, Lester arrives with the loan officer. It turns out that the loan officer is Gary's ex-wife! Mary tries to keep Sandra and Gary in the kitchen until Cynthia leaves. When she finally leaves, the coast is clear...until Cynthia comes back and sees Gary in the apartment. She tells Lester that the deal is off and throws a pie in Gary's face. She later returns to apologize for being unprofessional, but once again runs into Gary, this time kissing Sandra. She calls the deal off once again, and the entire group gets into an argument outside 227. Sandra later finds out that Gary is the owner of a costume jewelry store.
84	16	"Mary's Cookies"	Gerren Keith	Mickey Rose	February 25, 1989	23.6	15.6/28
Mary's cookie sales at Brenda's school are putting Ed's Cookies out of business. He proposes that she go into business with him. They agree, but when Mary realizes that she isn't making more than she was when she was alone, she pulls out of the deal. Ed (Flip Wilson) comes by the next day and offers Mary $15,000 for the recipe. She eventually sells it, but not before Lester comes in and shows her a headline that reads, Big Company to buy cookie recipe from a local baker for $100,000. Mary devises a plan to get the recipe back. Before Ed can sell the recipe, she comes in with Sandra dressed as a nun and tells the buyer that the recipe actually belongs to "Sister Sandra." He doesn't want to cheat the convent out of their money so he decides not to buy from Sandra. Mary later finds out that her grandmother's cookie recipe is actually Famous Amos' recipe. Also guest-starring Ned Wertimer.
85	17	"For Richer, For Poorer"	Gerren Keith	Dick Bensfield	March 4, 1989	23.4	15.3/27
Sandra's new boyfriend (Cleavon Little) keeps showering her with gifts. When everyone meets him, they are surprised—he is Pearl's age! He asks Sandra to marry him and gives her a day to think about it. She tells him no, and he has a heart attack. In the hospital, Mary and Sandra pose as doctor and nurse because the rude desk nurse will not let them see him. Sandra decides to tell him that she will marry him, since she thinks that he is on his death bed and it would make him happy. The next day when they return to the hospital, Abner has made a recovery. It turns out that his "heart attack" was gas, and he says he is ready to marry the nurse who raised his spirits. He thinks that nurse was the rude desk RN, nurse Grubb, and Sandra doesn't object. Meanwhile, Brenda, Calvin, and Alexandria are trying to raise ticket money for a Prince concert.
86	18	"The Class of '89"	Gerren Keith	Dave DiGregorio & Arnie Wess	March 18, 1989	22.0	13.8/25
Mary tells the kids that she has the hookup to get Run–D.M.C. to play at their prom, but the problem is the kids cannot afford the $5000 fee. Dylan takes their money and invests it in a stock, which goes belly-up. They end up losing all of their money and cannot afford to have the prom in a hotel anymore. Instead, it is held in 227's neighborhood much to the kids' displeasure. Both Mary and Dylan go where Run DMC is and dress up as rappers to convince them to come. Dylan succeeds and Run DMC show up to rap at the prom. Note: This episode marks Countess Vaughn's last appearance as Alexandria.
87	19	"Trial and Error"	Gerren Keith	Daryl Busby	April 1, 1989	22.6	14.9/27
Both Mary and Sandra get commissioned to the same murder trial. There are 11 votes guilty and 1 vote not-guilty, Sandra choosing not-guilty. After hours, she still has not changed her vote and Mary is annoyed because her anniversary is that night. They vote one last time, and this time the 1 not-guilty vote is from Mary. The judge sequesters them for the evening in a hotel and Mary is going to miss her anniversary dinner with Lester. Lester sneaks into the hotel room and brings Mary caviar and champagne. The next day, Mary presents her theory of what actually happened (pertaining to the "murder" on the boat) and the jury agrees and they all vote not-guilty. Their verdict was the right one, because later the "murdered victim" was found on the French Riviera with her husband's best friend, which was stated in a voice-over.
88	20	"The Bet"	Gerren Keith	Mark Tuttle	April 8, 1989	19.1	13.3/25
Sandra bets Mary and Rose that she can stay away from men better than they can stick to their diet. They each send temptations the other's way but it all comes to a head when Lester's business partner (Michael Dorn) comes over for dinner. He tells the Jenkins that he can get Sandra to kiss him so the bet will be over, but if he can't, then he will give Mary and Lester 2 weeks free hotel stay at a hotel that he owns in Jamaica. Well, now Mary is rooting for Sandra to stay away from men. Rose comes downstairs, but she wants Sandra to kiss Howard because she is tired of dieting. Finally, Howard tricks Sandra and kisses her, but both she and Rose are relieved because now they can both do what they want.
89	21	"No, My Darling Daughter"	Gerren Keith	Mike Scott & Daryl G. Nickens	April 15, 1989	17.7	12.5/24
Lester hires a young ex-con from the persuasion on Mary. They both admit that he is doing a great job and are happy with him until he asks Brenda out. They object and eventually tell Mike that he is not allowed to see Brenda. He feels dejected and decides he may as well not take the GED test as planned, because people will always see him as an ex-con. The real Joe Clark of Lean on Me fame comes and gives him words of encouragement and he decides to take the test. The Jenkins apologize for the way they treated him.
90	22	"House Number"	Gerren Keith	Peter Gallay	May 6, 1989	16.6	11.3/22
When Pearl, Mary, Rose and Sandra get locked into the laundry room, they all reminisce about how they each arrived at 227. Pearl moved in with her mother, Rose lived across the hall from a loud rock band called The Henderson Curse as she meets one of its members (portrayed by Rob Schneider in one of his earlier roles before Saturday Night Live), and Lester had just lost his job at a construction site causing him to start his own independent construction company while Mary was pregnant with Brenda. Lester eventually finds them all in the laundry room and opens the door so they can leave. By that time, Brenda and Calvin had joined the 4 ladies.
91	23	"Jackée"	Tony Singletary	Michael G. Moye	May 11, 1989	29.9	19.8/33
Sandra has moved to New York, but finds herself jobless after she finds out that the film company that she works for specializes in porn films! So once she finds her apartment, she meets a woman who tells her about a job opening at her job. Sandra goes with her the next day and gets the job at the spa. Sandra finds out that her new friend's boyfriend is using her, but when she tells her, she doesn't believe Sandra. Finally, when she hears it for herself, she cuts the boyfriend loose and her and Sandra are back on good terms. Note: This episode was a pilot for a potential spinoff starring Jackée. Helen Martin guest stars as Pearl.
92	24	"For Sale"	Gerren Keith	Story by : Marla Gibbs & Dorian Gibbs; Teleplay by : Bill Boulware & Al Gordon	May 13, 1989	16.6	11.6/25
Rose sells the building at the same time that Eva Rawley (Toukie Smith), a sister of Lester's friends, comes to visit. She is staying with the Jenkins and is driving them crazy, so they get the great idea for her to be hired as the building manager, which comes with a rent-free apartment. Meanwhile, Mary and Rose learn from a representative (Kelsey Grammer) that the company that bought 227 wants to renovate it and throw all the tenants out, who then become mad at Rose for selling the building. When Eva finds original sheet music from John Philip Sousa, the Jenkins use that to convince the management company representative that the building is a historical landmark so it can't get torn down as the representative goes to tell his boss Mr. Barlow.

=== Season 5 (1989–90) ===
No. overall	No. in season	Title	Directed by	Written by	Original release date	U.S. viewers (millions)
93	1	"Take My Diva... Please!"	Gerren Keith	John Boni & Larry Spencer	September 23, 1989	19.7
Mary's organized a charity benefit featuring opera diva Beverly Morris (Nell Carter). Tensions build with the prima donna, significantly complicated by Sandra dating Beverly's former boyfriend, Armand. Despite Mary's hopes to keep them apart, Sandra and Beverly meet in the powder room, then things get hairy. Note: Beginning with this episode, Toukie Smith and Barry Sobel are upgraded to series regulars. Jackée Harry is billed as "Special Guest Star" in the opening credits of specific episodes this season.
94	2	"Tenants, Anyone?"	Gerren Keith	Austin Kalish & Irma Kalish	September 30, 1989	16.5
Mary and the gang try to draw a bead on new landlord Julian c. Barlow (Paul Winfield), who's been ducking them. Meanwhile, Dylan hunts for a new roommate in light of the rent raise and settles for struggling limousine company owner Travis Fillmore (Stoney Jackson).: Note #1: First appearances of Stoney Jackson as Travis Fillmore and Paul Winfield as Julian c. Barlow.; Note #2: Jackée Harry is billed as "Special Guest Star" in the opening credits.
95	3	"A Pampered Tale"	Gerren Keith	Cassandra Clark & Debbie Pearl	October 14, 1989	16.3
The women head to a spa to prepare for a beauty contest. Meanwhile, Travis and Dylan care for a baby left in Travis' limo. Later, Lester and Julian help out until the baby's mother (Angela Bassett) returns. Note: Jackée Harry is billed as "Special Guest Star" in the opening credits.
96	4	"The Fight of the Century"	Gerren Keith	Story by : Bobby Crawford; Teleplay by : Ilunga Adell & Fred Johnson	October 21, 1989	17.3
When Mary causes Lester to miss a prizefight, they have a bout that could deliver a knockout punch to their marriage, so Lester stays with swinging bachelors Dylan and Travis.
97	5	"How the West Was Fun: Part 1"	Gerren Keith	John Boni & Larry Spencer	October 28, 1989	16.0
The Jenkins and their friends vacation at a dude ranch, where the owner's mineral water supply is being stolen by rustlers. Meanwhile, Mary lassos Rose and Sandra into a treasure hunt, and Dylan takes a liking to a filly. Note: Jackée Harry is billed as "Special Guest Star" in the opening credits.
98	6	"How the West Was Fun: Part 2"	Gerren Keith	Mike Scott & Daryl G. Nickens	November 4, 1989	16.5
Continuing from the last episode, Lester puts together a posse to find the womenfolk when the water rustlers take them hostage. Note: Jackée Harry is billed as "Special Guest Star" in the opening credits.
99	7	"Video Activity"	Gerren Keith	John Boni & Larry Spencer	November 11, 1989	18.2
Dylan tells his class that Bobby Brown is shooting a video at Brenda's high school. Brenda plagiarizes an old essay of Mary's to win a part as an extra when she can't come up with one of her own. Brenda kept putting off writing it by going to pep rallies, football games, and parties with Calvin at Morgan State, and on Sunday night, she still does not have her paper done. When Mary wrote it (25 years earlier), she received an A+, but Brenda gets a C and is not one of the five chosen to appear in Bobby Brown's video. Meanwhile, Julian bribes Travis into bringing Bobby Brown to his penthouse so he can discuss going into business ventures with each other. Bobby Brown decides that he does not want only five students to appear in his video, but the whole class. Brenda is allowed to be in the video, but she is still grounded by Mary and has to write 3 more papers for Mary afterwards.
100	8	"Flying Down to Leo's"	Gerren Keith	Debbie Pearl & Cassandra Clark	November 18, 1989	18.4
When Lester is unable to attend his birthday party due to being stuck on a construction job, Mary and Sandra fly up to join him. En route, they get stranded at a diner and run into gang members who want them as their biker chicks. Lester hears about what happens and ropes Rose, Pearl, Dylan, Travis, and Julian to come to their aid. Note: Jackée Harry is billed as "Special Guest Star" in the opening credits.
101	9	"Reunion Blues"	Gerren Keith	Mike Scott & Daryl G. Nickens	November 25, 1989	18.5
Dylan's mother (Charlotte Rae) moves in with him and Travis after leaving his father, who she found out is cheating on her. While talking to Mary and the ladies, she gets her confidence back and begins spending a lot of time with Julian, to everyone's surprise. When Dylan McMillan Sr. (Reid Shelton) comes to 227 to apologize, he finds her on a "date" in Julian's penthouse as Dylan works to get his parents back together.
102	10	"The Perfume Game"	Gerren Keith	Cassandra Clark & Debbie Pearl	December 2, 1989	17.7
Sandra comes up with a slogan for a new perfume, but she thinks it stinks when her ad-agency boss steals her idea. Mary enlists her neighbors and Julian to help get even with that boss. Note: Jackée Harry is billed as "Special Guest Star" in the opening credits. This is also her final appearance.
103	11	"War Is Heck"	Gerren Keith	Elaine Newman & Ed Burnham	December 9, 1989	16.8
After seeing that college is more difficult than he imagined, Calvin wants to quit school and join the Army. Lester tries to put him through his paces at a mock boot camp, but Calvin exceeds his expectations. However, military life becomes a frightening experience when the camp comes under attack for real with Lester, Dylan, and Travis caught in the attack.
104	12	"Guess Who's Not Coming to Christmas"	Gerren Keith	Alicia Marie Schudt	December 16, 1989	19.8
When everybody skips out on Mary's Christmas Eve party, she decides to invite her landlord Julian in hopes of livening things up. Also, everybody gets to meet Rose's new boyfriend Warren (Kevin Peter Hall).
105	13	"There Go the Clowns"	Gerren Keith	Daryl Busby	December 23, 1989	16.1
Mary dons clown garb to erase a nasty message she left on the answering machine of Lester's business contact, an eccentric novelties magnate (Ronnie Schell).
106	14	"Come the Revolution"	Gerren Keith	Ilunga Adell & Fred Johnson	December 30, 1989	17.5
When Brenda buys a revealing dress to wear to her party, Mary and Lester make her return it. When she refuses to return it, her parents won't allow her to have the party. Under the pressure of one of the girls that she knows, Brenda decides to throw the party in Julian's penthouse (and wears her dress) when she discovers Julian will be away. Dylan and Travis learn Brenda is having a party when they come upstairs. Instead of stopping it, Travis winds up in a dance contest with Calvin and some other partygoers. Mary and Lester find out about the party when Rose and Pearl come to the apartment talking about the loud music and the numerous teenagers coming into 227 that night. Julian comes home to discover the mess in his apartment just as when Mary and Lester end the party. With Mary and Lester scolding Dylan and Travis for not stopping the party immediately, Brenda has to face the consequences where she gets grounded and will have to clean up Julian's apartment.
107	15	"Where Do We Go From Here?"	Gerren Keith	John Boni & Larry Spencer	January 6, 1990	21.8
Lester falls asleep during church and dreams that he and Mary visit both Heaven and Hell. While in both places, they return to earth to see what has happened to their family and friends: While in Heaven, its representative (Della Reese) shows them that Brenda has inherited Lester's construction company and is a success when Calvin, her husband takes over. Pearl has moved in with them. Rose still hasn't come to terms with Mary's death.; While in Hell, its representative (Richard Moll) shows them that Calvin has becomes a failure and sells the business to Julian for $500. Brenda is pregnant and the family is in poverty. Rose has married Julian and they have raised the rent of the building big time. The representative states that this was because of Lester accidentally knocking down the priest earlier.; Afterwards, Lester ends up making up with the priest.
108	16	"Play Christy for Me"	Mikki Capparelli	Richard Albrecht & Casey Keller	January 13, 1990	19.3
While working as a deejay, Lester gets suggestive requests from a caller named Christy, who he believes to be Mary in disguise, asking him to play "Stardust". Lester flirts with the caller and invites her to spend a romantic evening with him at his apartment. When the night comes, Mary goes out with Rose and Pearl and Lester finds that Christy really isn't Mary at all! Afraid of Mary catching the woman in their home he runs her out but she shows up the next morning and it's revealed that Mary was playing a joke on him, and testing his loyalty as Christy is one of her friends.
109	17	"Knock It Off"	Gerren Keith	Mike Scott & Daryl G. Nickens	January 27, 1990	20.9
Travis finds $250,000 left in his limo, and is convinced by Mary & Lester to turn the money in. If the money isn't claimed within 30 days, Travis may keep it. The next day, a woman named Eartha Kitten (Iman) comes to the door and claims the money belongs to her boss, and is furious when he learns he turned the money in. Meanwhile, Mary & Lester are heading to Hawaii and have a Bon Voyage party the night before, but the party is interrupted when Eartha's employer, mob boss Mr. Big (Gary Coleman), holds everyone hostage. Warren saves the day when he returns disguised as a woman and pretends to romance Mr. Big. Before Travis can return with Mr. Big's money, Warren turns the tables on Mr Big and has him arrested.
110	18	"Do Not Pass Go: Part 1"	Gerren Keith	Alicia Marie Schudt	February 3, 1990	21.3
For Pearl's birthday, everyone goes to Atlantic City for a Luther Vandross concert. While there, Mary has a lucky streak at gambling. Lester decides to go into business with Julian, owning part of a promising boxer. Pearl looks for Luther Vandross, but when a mob goes after Luther, Pearl's antique diamond brooch is stolen. Brenda and Calvin try sneaking into the casino (in various unconvincing disguises) in hopes of winning a new car. Travis finds out his tickets for the concert weren't ordered and decides to enter a comedy contest to win tickets for Pearl. Meanwhile, Warren has planned a special weekend for Rose, and asks her to marry him. When a thrilled Rose goes to tell her friends, Warren makes a pass at another woman and is spotted by Mary. But before Mary can tell Rose, Rose asks her to be her matron of honor.
111	19	"Do Not Pass Go: Part 2"	Gerren Keith	Richard Albrecht & Casey Keller	February 10, 1990	19.9
Continuing from the last episode, Mary's luck runs out in Atlantic City and she loses all her winnings, including $3000 she promised Lester for his share of the prize fighter. Meanwhile, Warren and the mystery woman meet again and Rose spots them in a compromising position. She breaks off the engagement, but since neither will accept the ring, Mary takes it for safekeeping. Travis gets stage fright at the comedy show and Dylan takes his place. He wins, but is disqualified because he never officially entered - making Pearl lose out on seeing Luther. After Mary confesses to Lester that she lost all her money, she notices Rose's ring has been stolen. Mary stops the mystery woman and it turns out she's the one Warren was seeing. Warren admits he was seeing her, but did so in an official capacity because he knew she was the jewel thief who stole Pearl's brooch, Rose's ring and even Luther Vandross' watch, so she would let her guard down. Rose and Warren get married in Atlantic City after all. At the wedding, Luther comes to thank Mary for getting his watch back. In return, he sings at the wedding so Pearl can finally see him.
112	20	"You Gotta Have Art"	Gerren Keith	Alicia Marie Schudt	February 17, 1990	17.9
While helping Eva straighten up the gallery, Mary inadvertently creates a pop-art sensation, and spends some of her 15 minutes of fame on The Joan Rivers Show. Note: This is the only episode Alaina Reed does not appear in.
113	21	"Gone Fishing"	Mikki Capparelli	Michael Poryes	February 24, 1990	20.1
Julian recruits Mary to help him keep 227 out of the hands of his soon-to-be ex-wife (Rosalind Cash).
114	22	"Nightmare on 227"	Gerren Keith	Story by : Larry Strauss; Teleplay by : Bootsie^{[B]}	April 21, 1990	12.4
Mary gets the part of a slasher in a movie, but has an unscheduled rehearsal with an NYU dean. Guest-starring Lorraine Toussaint.
115	23	"The Class of '90"	Gerren Keith	David Garber & Bruce E. Kalish	April 29, 1990	7.2
Just before Brenda gets ready to graduate high school, Mary is rushed to the hospital with appendicitis. Mary gets a lesson in plastic surgery from her roommate (Phyllis Diller) and Lester gives low marks to his father's girlfriend.
116	24	"No Place Like Home"	Gerren Keith	Story by : Marla Gibbs & Dorian Gibbs; Teleplay by : Bootsie^{[B]} & Marla Gibbs	May 6, 1990	7.5
Mary has a daymare that she's homeless after misinterpreting a plea for help from a street person as a threat to her safety. In this daymare, nobody knows her and that she can't get a job despite the "help wanted" signs. She encounters the same homeless man in the park. After the daymare, Mary and Lester decide to help the homeless where Mary runs into the same homeless man. Even Julian is helping out with the homeless. Note: Series finale.

== Notes ==
1. A. 'C.J. Banks' is a pseudonym for Michael G. Moye.
2. B. 'Bootsie' is a pseudonym for J. Stanford Parker.
