= Christopher Williams (singer) =

American singer and actor (born 1967)

- Born: Christopher Lawrence Williams; August 22, 1967 (age 59); New York City, U.S.
- Occupations: Singer; actor
- Years active: 1988–present
- Relatives: Ella Fitzgerald (aunt); Al B. Sure! (cousin)
- Musical career
- Origin: Richmond, Virginia, U.S.
- Genres: R&B; new jack swing; soul
- Labels: Geffen; Uptown; Giant; Renegade

Christopher Lawrence Williams (born August 22, 1967) is an American singer and actor. Emerging in the late 1980s as a recording artist with Geffen Records, Williams became a notable figure in the new jack swing era with a series of R&B chart hits, including "Talk to Myself" (1989), "I'm Dreamin'" (1991), and "Every Little Thing U Do" (1993). He is also known for his work in film and theater, most notably for his role as Kareem Akbar in the 1991 crime drama New Jack City.

== Career ==
=== Music ===
Williams' single "I'm Dreamin'", from the New Jack City soundtrack, reached No. 1 on Billboard's Hot R&B/Hip-Hop Singles & Tracks chart. After a six-year hiatus from recording, he released Real Men Do on the independent label Renegade in 2001. The album received a highly favorable review in Ebony magazine that summer.

Between solo projects, Williams contributed to several recordings, including Alex Bugnon's As Promised, performing a smooth-jazz version of Mary J. Blige's "All That I Can Say," Twista & the Speedknot Mobstaz track "In Your World," an upbeat song featured on the Doctor Dolittle soundtrack, and the Café Soul All-Stars album, appearing on the single "Used to Be."

His additional soundtrack contributions include "Tha 2 of Us" from Bulletproof; "Superhero" from Butter; "Boom and the Bang" (featuring R&B singer Nikki Ross-Turnley) and " I'm Yours" from the stage-play soundtrack Men Cry in the Dark; and "Stranger in My Life" from Gunmen.

Other collaborations throughout his career comprise "Round and Round" and "No Sunshine" (with Chantay Savage) from Phuture Flava; "Love You More Than Words Can Say" from Soul Blitz Allstars; "I Hope That We Can Be Together Soon," a duet with Miki Howard; "You Are So Fine," a duet with Shae; "Can't Wait to Be with You" from DJ Jazzy Jeff & The Fresh Prince's Code Red; "I Wanna B Ure Lover" from F.S. Effect's So Deep It's Bottomless; and "Sexual Healing," a duet with reggae dancehall artist Patra.

At the end of 1994, Williams joined the R&B collective Black Men United for the hit single "U Will Know," recorded for the film Jason's Lyric and its accompanying soundtrack. The group featured artists such as El DeBarge, Al B. Sure!, Gerald Levert, and others.

=== Acting ===
Williams appeared in the 1991 film New Jack City as Kareem Akbar, one of Nino Brown's assistants. He also had a cameo appearance in the 1990s police drama New York Undercover as "the singer," performing "Stranger in My Life" in the episode titled "The Shooter." He made another cameo in the film Gunmen, starring Christopher Lambert and Mario Van Peebles, performing the song "Stranger in My Life."

Williams also starred or co-starred in several off-Broadway and touring theatre productions during the 2000s, including A Good Man Is Hard to Find, A House Is Not a Home, Men Cry in the Dark, The Love You Save, and The Man He Used to Be. In 2012, he played a lead role in the stage play The Clean Up Woman, written by J. D. Lawrence, alongside Telma Hopkins and Jackée Harry.

He also appeared in the stage plays Guilty Until Proven Innocent (starring K-Ci & JoJo) and The Man of Her Dreams, which starred Shirley Murdock and Dave Hollister of Blackstreet fame. Additionally, Williams portrayed Ned in the 2002 B-movie comedy-horror film Revenge of the Unhappy Campers (also known as Night of the Unhappy Campers), which has not been released to DVD for sale.

== Personal life ==
Williams mother was Jamaican American and his father is white/Caucasian. He is the nephew of jazz singer Ella Fitzgerald and cousin of singer Al B. Sure!.

Williams has three children:

- With Maya Hylton, son Justin (born 1988)
- With Stacey Dash, son Austin (born 1991)
- With Heather Barnes, daughter Cierra (born 1993)

From 1991 until mid–1992, Williams dated actress Halle Berry. After Berry told interviewers that an abusive ex-boyfriend struck her so hard that she lost most of the hearing in her right ear, many people assumed that Williams was the unnamed ex-boyfriend. Williams defended himself to Eurweb, the entertainment news website, denying that he ever harmed Berry, and suggesting that Berry had been referring to actor Wesley Snipes.

=== Legal issues ===
In October 2017, Williams was arrested and charged with misdemeanor theft, accused of stealing a $99 pair of JBL headphones from a Kohl's department store in McDonough, Georgia.

=== Health issues ===
Williams made public in October 2022 that he had been struggling with health issues related to kidney failure and was in a coma November 5, 2021. He openly talked about his illness causing him to lose weight drastically down to 129 pounds and admitted that it was hard to pick up a fork to feed himself.

== Discography ==
=== Studio albums ===
Year	Album details	Peak positions	
Year	Album details	US	US R&B
1989	Adventures in Paradise: Released: July 25, 1989; Label: Geffen	—	23
1992	Changes: Released: December 29, 1992; Label: Uptown, MCA	63	12
1995	Not a Perfect Man: Released: February 28, 1995; Label: Giant	104	13
2001	Real Men Do: Released: September 25, 2001; Label: Renegade	—	—

=== Singles ===
Year	Single	Peak chart positions			Album
Year	Single	US	US R&B	US Dan	Album
1989	"Talk to Myself"	49	4	18	Adventures in Paradise
1989	"Promises, Promises"	—	7	—	Adventures in Paradise
1990	"One Girl"	—	31	—	Adventures in Paradise
1991	"I'm Dreamin'"	89	1	—	New Jack City
1991	"I Wanna B Ure Lover" (with F.S. Effect)	—	52	—	So Deep It's Bottomless
1992	"All I See"	104	19	—	Changes
1993	"Every Little Thing U Do"	75	7	—	Changes
1993	"Come Go with Me"	—	74	—	Changes
1995	"Dance 4 Me"	—	25	—	Not a Perfect Man
1995	"If You Say"	—	91	—	Not a Perfect Man
1997	"Round and Round"	—	—	—	Phuture Flava Vol. 1

== Filmography ==
=== Film ===
Year	Title	Role	Notes
1991	New Jack City	Kareem Akbar	The Educated Brother from the Bank
1994	Gunmen	Himself	
2002	Revenge of the Unhappy Campers	Ned	
2003	Men Cry in the Dark	Pretty Tony	Video
2009	The Man of Her Dreams	Jamal	
2009	Thor's Hammer	Grande	Short
2010	The Clean Up Woman	Stewart Adams	
2011	The Love You Save	Billy	TV movie
2015	Angry Insecure Men 2	Marcus	
2019	Love Dot Com: The Social Experiment	Joe Jeffries	

=== Television ===
Year	Legacy	Role	Notes
1989–92	Soul Train	Himself	Guest Cast: Season 19–20 & 22
1990	Showtime at the Apollo	Himself	Episode: "Episode #3.14"
1992	The Uptown Comedy Club	Himself	Episode: "Episode #1.3"
1993	MTV Unplugged	Himself	Episode: "Uptown Unplugged"
1995	New York Undercover	Himself	Episode: "The Shooter"
2009	Hawthorne	Detective	Episode: "Mother's Day"
2011	Life After	Himself	Episode: "Christopher Williams"
2014	The Real Housewives of Atlanta	Himself	Recurring Cast: Season 6
2016	Inside the Label	Himself	Episode: "Uptown Records, Part II"
2020	Unsung	Himself	Episode: "Christopher Williams"
2020–21	The Family Business	Richard	Guest Cast: Season 2–3
