= Facts of Life (Danny Madden song) =

Single by Danny Madden

from the album New Jack City/These Are the Facts of Life
- Released: 1991
- Genre: R&B
- Label: Giant Records
- Songwriters: Carl McIntosh; T. Jacobs; Danny Madden; Keith Nicholas

"Facts of Life" is a song by American R&B singer Danny Madden. It was released in 1991 by Giant Records as the first single from his debut album, These Are the Facts of Life (1991). The song was also featured on the New Jack City soundtrack.

== Charts ==
=== Weekly charts ===
Chart	Date	Peak position
UK Singles (OCC)	Sept 1990	72
US Hot R&B Singles (Billboard)	1991	91

=== Year-end charts ===
Chart	Date	Position
UK Club Chart (Record Mirror)	1990	58
