= Talk to Myself =

Talk to Myself may refer to:

- "Talk to Myself" single from Adventures in Paradise (Christopher Williams album) (1989)
- "Talk to Myself", song from Stories (Avicii album)
- "Talk to Myself", song Thug on da Line
- "Talk to Myself", song from Young Forever (Nessa Barrett album)
