= All I See (Christopher Williams song) =

Single by Christopher Williams

from the album Changes
- Released: 1992
- Genre: R&B, soul
- Length: 4:18
- Label: Uptown
- Songwriters: Horace Brown, Donald Earle DeGrate, Jr, Christopher Williams
- Producer: DeVante Swing

Christopher Williams singles chronology
"Dreamin'" (1991)	"All I See" (1992)	"Every Little Thing U Do" (1993)

"All I See" is a song by American R&B artist Christopher Williams recorded for his second album Changes (1992). The song was released as the second single from the album. In 2021, singer Bryson Tiller sampled the song for his song "Still Yours", which featured rapper Big Sean, on his third studio album Anniversary.

== Track listings ==
12", Vinyl

1. "All I See" (Radio) - 4:15
2. "All I See" (Instrumental) - 4:41
3. "All I See" (Album) - 4:43

== Personnel ==
Information taken from Discogs.

- production: DeVante Swing
- writing: DeVante Swing, Andre Harrell, Christopher Williams

== Charts ==
=== Weekly charts ===
Chart (1992–1993)	Peak position
US Bubbling Under Hot 100 (Billboard)	4
US Hot R&B/Hip-Hop Songs (Billboard)	19

=== Year-end charts ===
Chart (1993)	Position
US Hot R&B/Hip-Hop Songs (Billboard)	92
