= 227 (TV series) =

American sitcom (1985–1990)

- Season one title screen
- Genre: Sitcom
- Created by: C.J. Banks; Bill Boulware
- Based on: Two Twenty Seven by Christine Houston
- Developed by: Jack Elinson
- Starring: Marla Gibbs; Hal Williams; Alaina Reed Hall; Jackée Harry; Helen Martin; Regina King; Kia Goodwin; Curtis Baldwin; Countess Vaughn; Toukie A. Smith; Stoney Jackson; Barry Sobel; Paul Winfield
- Theme music composer: Ray Colcord
- Opening theme: "There's No Place Like Home", performed by Marla Gibbs
- Composer: Ray Colcord
- Country of origin: United States
- Original language: English
- No. of seasons: 5
- No. of episodes: 116 (list of episodes)

Production
- Executive producers: Perry Grant (1985–1986); Dick Bensfield (1985–1987, 1988); George Burditt (1987–1988); Ron Bloomberg (1987–1988); Jack Elinson (1985–1987); Irma Kalish (1988–1990)
- Producers: Richard Gurman (1985–1987); Bob Myer (1985–1986); Ronald Rubin (1987–1988); Larry Spencer (1989–1990); Roxie Wenk-Evans (1986–1989, 1990); Bob Young (1985–1986)
- Camera setup: Multi-camera
- Running time: 22–24 minutes
- Production companies: Embassy Television (1985–1986; season 1); Embassy Communications (1986–1987; seasons 2–3); ELP Communications (1988–1990; seasons 3–5); Columbia Pictures Television (1988–1990; seasons 3–5)

Original release
- Network: NBC
- Release: September 14, 1985 – May 6, 1990

227 is an American sitcom television series that originally aired on NBC from September 14, 1985, to May 6, 1990. The series, created by C.J. Banks and Bill Boulware, stars Marla Gibbs as Mary Jenkins, a sharp-tongued, inner-city resident gossip and housewife. Other major characters include her husband Lester (Hal Williams), neighbor Sandra Clark (Jackée Harry), friend and landlady Rose Holloway (Alaina Reed Hall), friend and neighbor Pearl Shay (Helen Martin) and Mary and Lester's daughter Brenda (Regina King).

== Origins ==
The series was adapted from Two Twenty Seven, a stage play written in 1978 by Christine Houston about the lives of women in a predominantly Black apartment building in 1950s Chicago. The setting of the series, however, was changed to present-day Washington, D.C. The show was created as a starring vehicle for Marla Gibbs, who had become famous as Florence Johnston, the maid on The Jeffersons, and had starred in Houston's play in Los Angeles. This role was similar in nature to that of tart-tongued Florence; Gibbs's character, housewife Mary Jenkins, loved a good gossip and often spoke what she thought, with sometimes not-so-favorable results. Gibbs was also credited as a "creative consultant" for the series.

According to Gibbs, 227 was originally offered to ABC but sold to NBC. Since The Jeffersons was still on the air on CBS, the new show was scheduled to begin in 1986. However, when The Jeffersons was unexpectedly canceled in 1985, Gibbs was free to begin, and 227 went into production a year earlier than had been previously planned.

== Synopsis ==
227 followed the lives of people in a middle-class apartment building, 227 Lexington Place (the numerical address from which the sitcom's name comes), in a Black neighborhood in Northeast, Washington, D.C. The show was centered around Mary Jenkins (Marla Gibbs), a nosy and tart-tongued but loving housewife. Her husband Lester Jenkins (Hal Williams) had his own construction company and their daughter Brenda (Regina King in her first television acting role) was boy-crazy yet smart and studious.

Also cast in 227 was Sandra Clark (Jackée Harry), Mary's younger neighbor who constantly bickered back and forth with her about their respective views on life. Although their relationship was antagonistic at first, Mary and Sandra became good friends as time went on. Also living in the building was Pearl Shay (Helen Martin), a feisty but kind-hearted busybody neighbor on the first floor who was known for snooping and had a sharp sense of humor. Pearl had a grandson named Calvin Dobbs (Curtis Baldwin), whom Brenda had a crush on and would finally date later in the series' run.

Rose Lee Holloway (Alaina Reed Hall) was Mary's level-headed best friend and often the voice of reason among 227's residents. She and Mary were often seen sitting on the front stoop of the building, exchanging rumors and gossip with Pearl adding sly commentary and humor from her front window. In the premiere episode, Rose became the unexpected landlady of the building after the building's stingy slumlord Mr. Calloway died. Rose stayed on as landlady until the fourth season and had a daughter named Tiffany Holloway (Kia Goodwin) who was Brenda's closest friend. However, Goodwin's mother was unhappy in California, so the child actor was released from her contract. Tiffany was written out of the series after the second season, although she was mentioned occasionally.

In the first season, both Helen Martin and Curtis Baldwin, who had only been recurring stars, appeared in nearly every episode. From season 2 onward, they were upped to series regulars.

By the time taping started on the third season in 1987, Jackée Harry, who had just won an Emmy for Outstanding Supporting Actress, changed her stage name to simply Jackée, which she used until 1994. In the fourth season, an 11-year-old child prodigy named Alexandria DeWitt (Countess Vaughn) became the Jenkins' house guest. Vaughn received her role after she appeared on Star Search and declared to host Ed McMahon that her favorite show was 227. However, Alexandria left during Calvin's graduation episode near the end of season four to reunite with her father, who, after completing his archaeological dig in the Amazon, had moved to London to catalogue his items.

After the fourth season, Jackée's television pilot, titled "Jackée", found Sandra moving to New York City and finding work at a spa. NBC aired the episode on May 11, 1989. The pilot was rejected and Jackée left the show. However, she was a guest star in seven of the final season's episodes where she was billed as "Special Guest Star" in the opening credits of the episodes she was in.

In the show's final season, Toukie Smith and Barry Sobel are promoted to the main cast after appearing in the last season while Stoney Jackson and Paul Winfield joined the cast in an effort to stop the show's declining ratings. In the end, the cast additions proved fruitless and 227 ended its run in the spring of 1990.

== Characters ==
Actor	Character	Seasons				
Actor	Character	1	2	3	4	5
Marla Gibbs	Mary Hurley Jenkins	Main	Main	Main	Main	Main
Hal Williams	Lester Jenkins	Main	Main	Main	Main	Main
Alaina Reed Hall	Rose Lee Holloway (later Merriwether)	Main	Main	Main	Main	Main
Jackée Harry	Sandra Clark	Main	Main	Main	Main	Guest
Regina King	Brenda Jenkins	Main	Main	Main	Main	Main
Kia Goodwin	Tiffany Holloway	Main	Recurring	Recurring		
Helen Martin	Pearl Shay	Recurring	Main	Main	Main	Main
Curtis Baldwin	Calvin Dobbs	Recurring	Main	Main	Main	Main
Countess Vaughn	Alexandria DeWitt				Main	
Barry Sobel	Dylan McMillan				Recurring	Main
Toukie A. Smith	Eva Rawley				Guest	Main
Stoney Jackson	Travis Filmore					Main
Paul Winfield	Julian c. Barlow					Main
Reynaldo Rey	Ray		Recurring	Recurring	Recurring	Recurring
Kevin Peter Hall	Warren Merriwether					Recurring

=== Main characters ===
- Mary Jenkins (portrayed by Marla Gibbs) – A housewife who lives at 227 Lexington Place
- Lester Jenkins (portrayed by Hal Williams) – The patriarch of the Jenkins family. He is the proprietor of a construction company.
- Rose Lee Holloway (portrayed by Alaina Reed Hall) – The level-headed best friend of Mary. She and Mary would sit on the stoop and spread gossip to each other. Rose becomes the landlady of 227 Lexington Place after the stingy slumlord Mr. Calloway died. She loses this job in season five when Julian c. Barlow comes into view and succeeds her as the new landlord.
- Sandra Clark (portrayed by Jackée Harry) – A younger neighbor of the Jenkins family who Mary often bickers with. While Mary was a happily married housewife with a stable lifestyle, Sandra was a stylish, loose, man-hungry, somewhat ditzy diva and a serial dater who dressed provocatively. Although their relationship was antagonistic at first, Mary and Sandra became good friends as time went on.
- Pearl Shay (portrayed by Helen Martin) – A feisty old lady and busybody whose apartment window is near 227 Lexington Place's stoop. Whenever Mary and Rose are on the stoop talking about something, Pearl would often make commentary about the subject. Pearl Shay was the only character to appear in all 116 episodes of the show, appearing in the backdoor pilot "Jackée" as a guest star. Mary Jenkins, Lester Jenkins, and Rose Lee Holloway were absent in the "Jackée" pilot.
- Brenda Jenkins (portrayed by Regina King) – The daughter and only child of Mary and Lester
- Tiffany Holloway (portrayed by Kia Goodwin) – The daughter of Rose and close friend of Brenda. As mentioned above, her character was dropped after season two and is occasionally mentioned.
- Calvin Dobbs (portrayed by Curtis Baldwin) – The grandson of Pearl. He would later become Brenda's boyfriend in the series.
- Alexandra DeWitt (portrayed by Countess Vaughn) – An 11-year-old prodigy that stays with the Jenkins as a house-guest during season four
- Eva Rawley (portrayed by Toukie Smith) – An artist who moves into 227 Lexington Place at the end of season four where she becomes the building manager. By season five, she loses the building manager job when Julian c. Barlow appears. Eva would later get a job at an art gallery.
- Dylan McMillan (portrayed by Barry Sobel) – A history teacher at Waverly High School who lives at 227 Lexington Place ever since his debut in season four
- Travis Filmore (portrayed by Stoney Jackson) – The owner of a limousine service that becomes Dylan's roommate in season five
- Julian c. Barlow (portrayed by Paul Winfield) – A snide and wealthy man who becomes the landlord of 227 Lexington Place in season five after it was purchased at the end of season four. He resides in a penthouse that was built at the top of 227 Lexington Place. Julian mentions that the "c" that begins his middle name was lower-cased by his mother to make it sound humble. Despite his personality, Julian has occasionally helped out his tenants with different situations.

=== Recurring characters ===
- Ray (portrayed by Reynaldo Rey) – A mail carrier who has 227 Lexington Place on his route
- Cora (portrayed by Eve Smith) – An elderly resident of 227 Lexington Place
- Emma Johnson (portrayed by Lynn Hamilton) – A Sunday school teacher and Mary's rival at the church
- Warren Merriwether (portrayed by Kevin Peter Hall) – A detective who dates Rose

== Episodes ==
Season	Episodes	Originally released		Rank	Rating
Season	Episodes	First released	Last released	Rank	Rating
1	22	September 14, 1985	May 3, 1986	20	18.8
2	22	October 4, 1986	May 30, 1987	14	18.9
3	24	September 26, 1987	May 7, 1988	27	16.3
4	24	October 8, 1988	May 13, 1989	35	14.5
5	24	September 23, 1989	May 6, 1990	60	11.5

== Ratings ==
With the exception of The Cosby Show and A Different World, 227 achieved higher ratings than other sitcoms airing at the time with a predominantly African-American cast during the first two seasons of its original run on NBC.

- 1985–1986: #20 (18.80 rating)
- 1986–1987: #14 (18.90 rating)
- 1987–1988: #27 (16.44 rating)
- 1988–1989: #35 (14.47 rating)
- 1989–1990: #60 (11.53 rating)

== Awards and nominations ==
Year	Award	Category	Recipient	Result	Ref.
1987	BMI Film & TV Awards	BMI TV Music Award	Ray Colcord	Won	
1987	Primetime Emmy Awards	Outstanding Supporting Actress in a Comedy Series	Jackée Harry	Won	
1988	Primetime Emmy Awards	Outstanding Supporting Actress in a Comedy Series	Jackée Harry	Nominated	
1989	Golden Globe Awards	Best Supporting Actress – Series, Miniseries or Television Film	Jackée Harry	Nominated	
1989	NAACP Image Awards	Outstanding Youth Actor/Actress	Regina King	Nominated	
1985	Young Artist Awards	Best Young Actress Starring in a New Television Series	Regina King	Nominated	
1986	Young Artist Awards	Exceptional Performance by a Young Actress in a Long Running Series – Comedy or Drama	Regina King	Nominated	
1986	Young Artist Awards	Exceptional Performance by a Young Actor Guest Starring in a Television Series – Comedy or Drama	Curtis Baldwin	Nominated	
1989	Young Artist Awards	Best Young Actress in a Featured, Co-Starring, Supporting, Recurring Role in a Comedy or Drama Series or Special	Countess Vaughn	Nominated	

== Series syndication ==
NBC aired daytime reruns of 227 from September 1989 to July 1990. The show went into syndication in the fall of 1990. It has previously aired on cable's BET, TV One, TV Land, Centric, UP (formerly GMC), Encore Black, OWN, Logo and The Grio.

In January 2017, the series began airing on digital subchannel Antenna TV, which continued until September 2021, when it began airing on sister network Rewind TV upon its launch. It moved back to Antenna on May 26, 2025, currently airing weeknights at 4 a.m. ET. Rewind also brought the show back to their lineup while it stayed on Antenna, airing it weeknights at 7 p.m. ET and Saturdays from 6 to 8 a.m. ET.

The show is owned and distributed by Sony Pictures Television.

In Canada, 227 is available online, broadcast, and on demand by CTV.

In Italy, the series currently airs on Campania's Canale 8 with only the fifth season.

The series became available to stream on Amazon Prime Video on July 15, 2021 and on Hulu on May 23, 2022.

== Home media ==
On September 28, 2004, Columbia TriStar Home Entertainment released the complete first season of 227 on DVD in Region 1.

On February 7, 2017, Mill Creek Entertainment re-released the first season on DVD in Region 1.
