= Not a Perfect Man =

Studio album by Christopher Williams
- Released: February 14, 1995
- Recorded: 1994
- Genre: R&B
- Length: 52:02
- Label: Giant
- Producer: Christopher Williams (exec.), James Stroud, Brian McKnight, Brandon Barnes, Chad "Dr. Ceuss" Elliot, Herb Middleton, Christopher Williams & Ike Lee III, Emanuel Dean, John "Funk" Alexander, Gordon Chambers

Christopher Williams chronology
Changes (1992)	Not a Perfect Man (1995)	Real Men Do (2001)

Singles from Not a Perfect Man
- 1. ""Dance 4 Me"" Released: 1995; 2. ""If You Say"" Released: 1995

Not a Perfect Man is the third studio album by American R&B artist Christopher Williams, released on February 14, 1995, on Giant Records.

The album peaked at No. 104 on the U.S. Billboard 200 and reached No. 13 on the R&B Albums chart.

== Track listing ==
No.	Title	Writer(s)	Producer(s), *Co-producer	Length
1.	"If You Say"	Ron Harris, Michael Little, Sami McKinney, Christopher Williams, BeBe Winans	James Stroud	5:16
2.	"Learning to Love Again"	Brian McKnight	Brian McKnight, Brandon Barnes	4:48
3.	"Dance 4 Me"	Chad Elliot, Christopher Williams, Herb Middleton, Natalie Macklin	Chad "Dr. Ceuss" Elliot, Herb Middleton	5:10
4.	"R U Ready"	Christopher Williams	Christopher Williams & Ike Lee III	4:55
5.	"Oh Girl"	Christopher Williams, Herb Middleton, Natalie Macklin, Rex Rightout	Herb Middleton	4:45
6.	"Lonely"	Christopher Williams, Emanuel Dean, Rahsaan Patterson	Emanuel Dean	4:13
7.	"Solidarity"	Alfred Cleveland, Christopher Williams, Crystal Johnson, John "Alexander" Funk*, Marvin Gaye, Natalie Macklin, Renaldo Benson, Tyrone Thompson	John "Funk" Alexander, Gordon Chambers	4:47
8.	"Never Stop"	Christopher Williams, Gordon Chambers, Ike Lee III	Gordon Chambers, Ike Lee III	4:18
9.	"Not a Perfect Man"	Christopher Williams, Gordon Chambers	Christopher Williams, Gordon Chambers	5:17
10.	"Down on My Knees"	Beth Nielsen Chapman	James Stroud	5:13
11.	"We Don't Know How to Say Goodbye"	Diane Warren	James Stroud	3:20

== Charts ==
Chart (1995)	Peak position
U.S. Billboard 200	104
U.S. R&B Albums	13
