= The Clean Up Woman =

The Clean Up Woman is a play by J. D. Lawrence (born 30 November 1999).

The play features Terri Adams, a journalist who pushes aside her newlywed domestic apron for a six-figure news anchor job with WNY5. But when Terri starts neglecting home for her new position, her supportive husband reaches his wit's end and demands she clean up her act, starting with the house. To keep the peace, her man, and her job, Terri hires a local cleaning service recommended by a co-worker. But if she's not careful, "The Clean Up Woman" might find that she's picking up more than she's supposed to.

Lawrence plays seven characters in the play, including a Hindu cab-driver, a 75-year-old white man, a rapper and a hairdresser. It also stars Emmy Award winner Jackée Harry, Telma Hopkins, singer/actor Christopher Williams and Grammy award winner Fred Hammond. The Clean Up Woman follows the same formula as most urban gospel plays: Black folks with problems engaging in laughter, music and a spiritual epiphany.

The play is the highest grossing stage play since the theater's 1977 conception at Arts & Letters in Dallas.

In 2012 the play was released on DVD.
