= Changes (Christopher Williams album) =

Studio album by Christopher Williams
- Released: December 29, 1992
- Recorded: 1991–1992
- Genre: R&B, new jack swing
- Length: 60:54
- Label: Uptown
- Producer: Andre Harrell (exec.), Christopher Williams (exec.), Stanley Brown, Sean "Puffy" Combs & Tony Dofat, The Hitmakers & Kevin Deane, DeVante Swing, CK Blunt, Kiyamma Griffin & Ike Lee III, Greg Cauthen, Kenny "K-Smoove" Kornegay, Mark Morales & Mark C. Rooney, Three Boys from Newark, Andre Wilson & Brian Wilson, Anthony Ransom

Christopher Williams chronology
Adventures in Paradise (1989)	Changes (1992)	Not a Perfect Man (1995)

Singles from Changes
- 1. "Dreamin'" Released: February 20, 1991; 2. "All I See"; 3. "Every Little Thing U Do" Released: March 16, 1993; 4. "Come Go with Me" Released: August 3, 1993

Changes is the second studio album from American R&B artist Christopher Williams, released on December 29, 1992, on Uptown Records.

The album peaked at sixty-three on the U.S. Billboard 200 and reached the twelfth spot on the R&B Albums chart.

Riding the waves of his #1 single, "I'm Dreamin', he would see another Top 10 single "Every Little Thing U Do" and a Top 20 R&B hit, "All I See".

== Track listing ==
No.	Title	Writer(s)	Producer(s), *Co-producer	Length
1.	"All I See"	Andre Harrell, Christopher Williams, DeVante Swing	DeVante Swing	4:18
2.	"Don't U Wanna Make Love"	Mark Morales, Mark C. Rooney, Joseph E. Kelley, Nathan Payne	Mark Morales & Mark C. Rooney	6:53
3.	"Good Luvin'" (with Mary J. Blige)	Christopher Williams, Ike Lee III, Kiyamma Griffin	CK Blunt, Kiyamma Griffin, Ike Lee III	4:48
4.	"Come Go with Me"	Kenny Gamble & Leon Huff	Christopher Williams & Greg Cauthen	4:59
5.	"When a Fool Becomes a Man"	Christopher Williams, Greg Cauthen, Eriq LaSalle	Andre Wilson & Brian Wilson, Christopher Williams*	5:26
6.	"Changes"	Anthony Ransom, Brian Wilson, Andre Wilson, Charles Chamberlain, B.J. Burks	Anthony Ransom, Andre Wilson & Brian Wilson*	5:10
7.	"Where Is the Love"	Kenny "Smoove" Kornegay, Kenny Greene, Christopher Williams	Kenny "Smoove" Kornegay, Darin "Piano Man" Whittington*	3:55
8.	"Let's Get Right"	Tony Dofat, Christopher Williams, Sean "Puffy" Combs	Sean "Puffy" Combs & Tony Dofat	5:14
9.	"Where Are U Now"	Kevin Deane, Christopher Williams, James Maynes, Case Woodard	The Hitmakers & Kevin Deane	6:28
10.	"Every Little Thing U Do"	3 Boyz From Newark, Christopher Williams	3 Boyz From Newark	4:44
11.	"Please, Please, Please"	Christopher Williams, DeVante Swing, Darryl Pearson	DeVante Swing, Darryl Pearson*	4:19
12.	"Dreamin'**"	Stanley Brown	Stanley Brown	4:40

(**): Track available on CD only

== Chart history ==
=== Album ===
Chart (1993)	Peak position
U.S. Billboard 200	63
U.S. R&B Albums	12

=== Singles ===
Year	Single	Peak chart positions		
Year	Single	U.S. Hot 100	U.S. Hot Dance Music/Maxi-Singles Sales	U.S. R&B Singles
1991	"Dreamin'"	89	16	1
1992	"All I See"	—	46	19
1993	"Come Go with Me"	—	—	74
1993	"Every Little Thing U Do"	75	12	7

"—" denotes releases that did not chart.

== Personnel ==
Information taken from Allmusic.

- arranging – DeVante Swing, Kenny "G-Love" Greene, Andre Wilson
- assistant engineering – Charlie Allen, Gordon Davies, Kevin Davis, Jason DeCosta, Ben Garrison, Rich July, David Kingsley, Stephen McLaughlin, Chrystin Nevarez, Chris Olivas, Ken Quartarone, Thom Russo
- assistant production – Andrew Cousins, Darryl Pearson, Darin Whittington, Christopher Williams, Andre Wilson, Brian Wilson
- composing – DeVante Swing, Kenny "G-Love" Greene
- creative director – Brett Wright
- drum machine – Ike Lee III, Mark Morales
- drums – Mark Morales
- engineering – Paul Arnold, Eric "Ibo" Butler, Ross Donaldson, Mike Fonda, Ben Garrison, David Kennedy, Tony Maserati, Angela Piva, Tony Smalios, Dave Way, Mark Wilson, Gary Wright
- executive production – Andre Harrell, Christopher Williams
- guitar – Henry Grate
- keyboards – Kevin Davis, Kevin Deane, Kiyamma Griffin, Avon Marshall, Mark C. Rooney
- make-up – Melvone Farrell
- mastering – Steve Hall, Dennis King, Jose Rodriguez
- mixing – Angela Piva,Charles "Prince Charles" Alexander, Stanley Brown, Sean "Puffy" Combs, David Dachinger, David Kennedy, Tony Maserati, Angela Piva, Dave Way
- mixing assistants – Hal Belknap, Jason DeCosta, Carl Glanville, Rich July, Dana Vicek
- performer – Mary J. Blige
- production – Stanley Brown, Sean "Puffy" Combs, Greg Cuathen, Kevin Davis, DeVante Swing, Kiyamma Griffin, Kenny "K-Smoove" Kornegay, Ike Lee III, Mark Morales, Anthony Ransom, Mark C. Rooney, Three Boys from Newark, Christopher Williams, Andre Wilson, Brian Wilson
- production coordination – Crystal Johnson
- vocal arrangement – DeVante Swing, Kenny "G-Love" Greene, Christopher Williams, Andre Wilson
- vocals – Mary J. Blige
- vocals (background) – Horace Brown, Kiyamma Griffin, Crystal Johnson, Omega Lowther, Brian Palmer, Mark C. Rooney, Christopher Williams, Andre Wilson
