= Every Little Thing U Do =

1993 single by Christopher Williams

Single by Christopher Williams

from the album Changes
- Released: March 16, 1993
- Genre: R&B, new jack swing
- Length: 4:44
- Label: Uptown
- Songwriters: Kiyamma Griffin; Vincent Herbert; Christopher Williams
- Producer: 3 Boyz from Newark

Christopher Williams singles chronology
"All I See" (1992)	"Every Little Thing U Do" (1993)	"Come Go with Me" (1993)

"Every Little Thing U Do" is a song by American R&B artist Christopher Williams recorded for his second album Changes (1992). The song was released as the album's third single in March 1993.

== Track listings ==
- 12", vinyl
1. "Every Little Thing U Do" (Album Version) - 4:43
2. "Every Little Thing U Do" (Radio Mix) - 4:15
3. "Every Little Thing U Do" (DawgHouse Mix) - 4:38
4. "Every Little Thing U Do" (Supermen Mix) - 5:15
5. "Every Little Thing U Do" (Mr. Kent's Mix) - 5:10
6. "Every Little Thing U Do" (Clark and Tim Flip Da Bass) - 5:15
7. "Every Little Thing U Do" (Instrumental) - 4:43
- CD
1. "Every Little Thing U Do" (Album Version) - 4:46
2. "Every Little Thing U Do" (DawgHouse Mix) - 4:39
3. "Every Little Thing U Do" (Radio Mix) - 4:18
4. "Every Little Thing U Do" (Supermen Mix) - 5:18
5. "Every Little Thing U Do" (Clark and Tim Flip Da Bass) - 5:17
6. "Every Little Thing U Do" (Mr. Kent's Mix) - 5:11
7. "Every Little Thing U Do" (Instrumental) - 4:45

== Personnel ==
Information taken from Discogs.

- executive production – Andre Harrell, Christopher Williams
- production – 3 Boyz from Newark
- rapping – Buttnaked Tim Dawg
- remixing – Buttnaked Tim Dawg, DJ Clark Kent
- vocal arranging – Christopher Williams

== Charts ==
Chart (1993)	Peak position
US Billboard Hot 100	75
US Hot Dance Music/Maxi-Singles Sales (Billboard)	12
US Hot R&B/Hip-Hop Singles & Tracks (Billboard)	7
US Cash Box Top 100	65
