= Danny Madden =

American R&B singer

Danny Madden is an American R&B singer, who was signed to the record label Giant Records in the 1990s. He scored his only chart hit with the single "Facts of Life," which peaked at number #91 on the US Billboard R&B chart. It reached #72 in the UK Singles Chart. It was featured on the New Jack City soundtrack. His debut album These Are the Facts of Life was released in 1991.
