= Christine Houston =

African-American writer

Christine Houston (born 1935 in Chicago, Illinois) is an American writer. She is the creator of the popular 1980s sitcom 227, and also worked on other shows including The Jeffersons, and Punky Brewster. Houston is not only a series writer, she also enjoys writing plays, and novels such as Laughing Through The Tears.

== Early life ==
Houston wrote Two Twenty Seven while attending Kennedy-King City College (KKC) in Chicago. She stated in an interview that she wrote the play on a dare from one of her friends. Though more familiar with acting, Houston decided to give her writing skills a try. She said "I knew I had to dig deep" while pondering what to write her stage play about. She drew from her past of growing up in apartment building 227 in Chicago and began to write her play. Two Twenty Seven immediately became quite popular amongst her peers, and she was asked by the theatre department at KKC to develop the play and have the students perform it. Houston wrote 227 based on her own childhood experiences, specifically surrounding the mother of one of her childhood friends. It encompasses the life that she experienced and one that she held close to her heart.

Houston never thought of herself as a comedic writer, and did not originally expect to write a sitcom. She said "I don't know about being a comedy writer, because I just think everything in life has its funny moments. Everything". This may have attributed to the shows success, as it was something that reflected daily life and humor, something that many Americans can relate to. 227 features a fun-loving cast, and its opening sequence features a similar vibe to that of Full House, except it features an all-black cast.

== Birth of 227 ==
After several contests such as The Lorraine Hansberry Playwriting Contest and the Norman Lear Playwriting Contest, Houston's style began to take shape. Eight years later, Hollywood caught sight of the play and of Houston and wanted a part of the action. It was during one of Two Twenty Seven's performances on tour that NBC first caught sight of the show. They had been invited by a woman named Marla Gibbs and immediately grabbed at the opportunity to air Two Twenty Seven as its own television series. Gibbs and Houston had met after Houston won the Lear award and wrote an episode of The Jeffersons titled "George Who?" However, when the episode was broadcast, it did not contain a single line from Houston's original script but it still credited her for her work.

It was after The Jeffersons had come to an end that Houston and Gibbs began to focus more on Two Twenty Seven, and Gibbs decided to spark the attention of three major television networks, NBC, CBS, and ABC. Once Two Twenty Seven was in production with NBC a few of Houston's original story outlines were changed such as the time period, moving from the 1950s to the 1980s, the location which moved from Chicago to Washington, D.C., and the written out name of "Two Twenty Seven" was changed to the numbers we see today. Journalist Thelma Sardin says that "Houston worked on the set of 227 for three years as a writer, the show ended in 1990".

== Awards and nominations ==
Houston's series became a milestone for many African-Americans in television. Not only was she the first African-American woman to ever be credited on television for her work, but she also received the NAACP Image Award for Playwriting. Houston is also an extremely important role model for her students, as she now teaches at Chicago State University. One of her students said in an interview that they're inspired "to be able to sit right here in class and learn so much from her because of her history and where she has been. Also, for her to take time out and still be in her 70s… and still come to class everyday… it's inspiring to me and she motivates me to be the best I can be and to write". Houston's story shows how art reflects and imitates life, and how this can be wonderfully beneficial to teach to the world around you. Houston refused to let "her background, which included years of racial tensions and great struggles, to stifle her talents".

She is an inspiration to many individuals and students and is acknowledged during Black History Month for her highly esteemed work and transformative power of education. Journalist Brandon Hampton calls Christine Houston "a living legend and a celebrated educator". Houston has never backed down from wanting the success of others, especially her children. In one interview she states "I am going to stay involved in other young people's lives to help them reach their goals in the field. All the things I know, I will share with students. You're never too late and you're never too old. It isn't over til' it's over". This mentality is one of the reasons that Houston enrolled in KKC in the first place, trying to prove to her three sons, whom at that time were teenagers, that you are never too old to learn.

== Recent works ==
Houston remains active even after the show ended, not only busy with her three children and husband whom she'd had before she first created the show at KKC, but also busy with creating new works such as Laughing Through The Tears and writing novels while attending Chicago State University (CSU) after graduating from KKC. Houston says "[I want to write not only of] the Black experience… I want to be a writer for humanity. I want to be a writer for all races of people. I want to show the good, the bad and the ugly". Houston has continued to influence others today as she holds the position of a playwright professor in the Communication, Media and Theatre Department at Chicago State University. Houston's most recent work has been finishing her novel Laughing Through The Tears which is about a mourning wife losing her husband of many years and how she deals with it.

Finally, Houston co-wrote a textbook with a woman named Christine List called The Screenwriter's Guidebook: Learning from African American Film and Television Writers. Proving that she is always looking out for her students, and how to guide them along their paths to a brighter future.
