= Adventures in Paradise (Christopher Williams album) =

Studio album by Christopher Williams
- Released: July 25, 1989
- Recorded: 1988–1989
- Genre: R&B, new jack swing
- Length: 56:52
- Label: Geffen Records
- Producer: Alton Wokie Stewart (tracks 1, 2 and 6); Timmy Gatling (tracks 1, 2 and 6); Gerald Levert & Marc Gordon (tracks 7 and 8); Robert Brookins (tracks 3 and 4); Dennis Matkosky (track 5; additional production on track 12); Timmy Allen (track 9); Nick Martinelli (tracks 10 and 11); Christopher Williams (track 12); Joel Davis (track 12)

Christopher Williams chronology
Adventures in Paradise (1989)	Changes (1992)

Professional ratings
Review scores
Source	Rating
AllMusic	3/5 stars

Adventures in Paradise is the debut studio album by R&B singer Christopher Williams. Released in 1989, the album charted at number twenty-three on the Billboard Top Soul Albums chart.

== Track listing ==
1. "Talk to Myself" 4:20
2. "Sexy Sex" 3:42
3. "Never Let Our Love Die" 4:30
4. "(Lift You Up) Turn Your Hurt Around" 5:14
5. "Paradise" 4:38
6. "Promises, Promises" 5:20
7. "One Girl" 3:20
8. "If That's What You Want" 5:15
9. "I'm Your Present" 5:40
10. "Always & Forever" 6:24
11. "Lover Come Back" 4:14
12. "Sweet Memories" 4:22

== Charts ==
=== Weekly charts ===
Chart (1989)	Peak position
US Top R&B/Hip-Hop Albums (Billboard)	23

=== Year-end charts ===
Chart (1990)	Position
US Top R&B/Hip-Hop Albums (Billboard)	68

=== Singles ===
Year	Single	Chart positions		
Year	Single	US Pop	US R&B	US Dance
1989	"Talk to Myself"	49	4	18
1989	"Promises, Promises"	-	7	-
1990	"One Girl"	-	31	-
