= Kia Goodwin =

American actress

- Years active: 1976–present

Kia Goodwin is an American actress. She is best known for her childhood role as Tiffany Holloway, Rose Holloway's daughter on the NBC comedy sitcom 227 for two seasons (1985–1987).

== Career ==
Goodwin made her first television appearance commercially in 1976 for such products as M&M's, Jello Pudding, and AT&T. In 1981, she joined the First National Touring Company of Annie, where she played the role of Duffy. After the tour closed in 1982, she went on to join the final Broadway cast of Annie playing the roles of Tessie and then Kate. At the same time, she went on to work on an ABC Afterschool Special in 1981, then appeared in 1984's Growing Up on Broadway.

In the spring of 1985, Goodwin was cast as Tiffany Holloway on the NBC sitcom 227 as a series regular during the show's first season. Goodwin's mother was unhappy in California and wanted to move back to New York, so she was let out of her contract and written out of the series after the second season, where Goodwin was now a recurring guest star. She reprised the role for the final time in a season three episode ("The Sing-Off").

She appeared in the 1993 HBO movie, Strapped as Latisha Jordan. In 1998 she appeared on Broadway again in Paul Simon's musical The Capeman. Later that year she co-starred opposite Jennifer Aniston in the 1998 film, The Object of My Affection; two years later, she appeared as a Young Nurse in the 2000 movie, The Opportunists. She has also guest starred on television shows such as Jake In Progress, Platinum, Barbershop, Law & Order: Special Victims Unit and Law & Order.

== Filmography ==
=== Film ===
Year	Title	Role	Notes
1998	The Object of My Affection	Juliet	
1999	The Opportunists	Young Nurse	
2001	Ordinary Sinner	Deborah	
2002	New World Order	Tommi	
2002	Swimfan	Rene	
2012	You're Nobody 'til Somebody Kills You	Michelle Malone	
2019	DC Noir	Mrs. Harris	

=== Television ===
Year	Title	Role	Notes
1981, 1993	ABC Afterschool Special	Stephanie / Marlen	2 episodes
1985–1988	227	Tiffany Holloway	21 episodes
1993	Strapped	Latisha Jordan	Television film
2001, 2015	Law & Order: SVU	Audrey Thompson / Shari	2 episodes
2003	Platinum	Lady Bryce	5 episodes
2005	Jake in Progress	Tracy Dawson	Episode: "Boys' Night Out"
2005–2006	Barbershop	Da Boot	4 episodes
2007	Law & Order	Kendra Washington	Episode: "The Family Hour"
2013–2015	The Good Wife	Sondra	5 episodes
2015	Show Me a Hero	Elaine Henderson	4 episodes
2016	Elementary	Yvette Ingram	Episode: "To Catch a Predator Predator"
2018	The Plug	Helen	Episode: "Bird Gets a Pass"
2019	The Code	Antoinette 'Toni' Poirier	2 episodes
