= Toukie Smith =

American actress and model (1952–2026)

- Smith in 1988
- Born: Doris Alicia Smith; September 25, 1952; Philadelphia, Pennsylvania, U.S.
- Died: November 4, 2026 (aged 74); New York City, U.S.
- Other name: Tookie Smith
- Occupations: Actress; model
- Years active: 1972–2026
- Known for: Eva Rawley – 227
- Partner: Robert De Niro (1988–1996)
- Children: 2
- Family: Willi Smith (brother)

Doris Alicia Smith (September 25, 1952 – November 4, 2026), known professionally as Toukie Smith, was an American actress and model. She was best known for her role as Eva Rawley on the NBC sitcom 227 (1989–90). She was the sister of fashion designer Willi Smith.

== Life and career ==
=== Early life ===
Doris Alicia Smith was born in Philadelphia, Pennsylvania, on September 25, 1952, to a mother who worked at a factory and a father who was a butcher. She had two brothers, including Willi Smith. She attended Fashion Institute of Technology.

=== Career ===
Smith started her career in 1972 as a model, working for such brands as Chanel, Versace, Geoffrey Beene, Issey Miyake, Norma Kamali, Thierry Mugler, and Patrick Kelly. She also modeled for her brother Willi Smith's brand WilliWear Ltd.

She also had a successful print career, including a photo campaign for Yves St. Laurent as well as appearances in the magazines Vogue, ELLE, Ebony, Cosmopolitan, Redbook, and Seventeen. In 1978, Smith was named Bloomingdale's Model of the Year and became the second African–American model to have a mannequin designed in her likeness. Besides 227, her acting credits included the films Talkin' Dirty After Dark (1991), Joe's Apartment (1994), and The Preacher's Wife (1996). Smith had a restaurant in the West Village neighborhood of New York City called Toukie's.

=== Personal life and death ===
From 1988 to 1996, Smith's partner was actor Robert De Niro, with whom she had twins conceived by in vitro fertilization and delivered by a surrogate mother.

Smith said that the nickname "Toukie" was given to her by her grandmother, and that it came from a record about a fire engine that had a lot of energy.

At the time of her death she resided in Battery Park City in Lower Manhattan. Smith died from complications of multiple sclerosis at a hospital near her home in Manhattan on November 4, 2026, at the age of 74.

== Filmography ==
- 1987–88: Miami Vice
- 1988: Me and Him
- 1989–90: 227
- 1991: Talkin' Dirty After Dark
- 1994: I Like It Like That
- 1996: Joe's Apartment
- 1996: The Preacher's Wife
- 1999: Goosed
