= I'm Dreamin' =

Single by Christopher Williams

Single by Christopher Williams

from the album New Jack City and Changes
- Released: February 20, 1991
- Recorded: 1990
- Genre: New jack swing
- Length: 4:41 (single version); 5:03 (soundtrack version)
- Label: Giant
- Songwriters: Stanley Brown; B. Durell Edwards
- Producer: Stanley Brown

Christopher Williams singles chronology
"One Girl" / "Lover Come Back" (1990)	"I'm Dreamin'" (1991)	"I Wanna Be Ure Lover" (1991)

"I'm Dreamin'" is a song by American recording R&B artist Christopher Williams. It is featured in ending credits of the 1991 film New Jack City and its soundtrack, in which Williams has a supporting role as Kareem Akbar. The song reached number one on the Billboard R&B Singles chart, Williams' only song to reach the summitt.

== Track listing ==
- 12" vinyl

A1. "I'm Dreamin'" (Radio Mix Without Rap) – 4:35
A2. "I'm Dreamin'" (Radio Mix With Rap) – 5:06
A3. "I'm Dreamin'" (Instrumental With Background Vocals) – 5:06
B1. "I'm Dreamin'" (Crazy Hip Hop) – 5:06
B2. "I'm Dreamin'" (Hip Hop Radio) – 5:06
B3. "I'm Dreamin'" (A Capella Slap Bass) – 5:06

- 7" vinyl

A1. "I'm Dreamin'" (Radio Mix Without Rap) – 4:35
B2. "I'm Dreamin'" (Hip Hop Radio) – 5:06

- Cassette

A1. "I'm Dreamin'" (Radio Mix Without Rap) – 4:35
B1. "I'm Dreamin'" (Radio Mix With Rap) – 5:06

== Charts ==
Chart (1991)	Peak position
U.S. Billboard Hot 100	89
U.S. Billboard Hot R&B Singles	1
U.S. Billboard Dance Music/Club Play	16

== See also ==
- List of Hot R&B Singles number ones of 1991
