= New Jack City (soundtrack) =

Soundtrack album by Various Artists
- Released: March 5, 1991
- Recorded: Various dates
- Studios: Unique Recording Studios, New York City
- Genres: R&B; hip hop; new jack swing
- Length: 48:42
- Labels: Giant; Reprise; Warner Bros.
- Producers: Al B. Sure!; Bobby Wooten; Carl McIntosh; Danny Madden; DJ Aladdin; Dr. Freeze; Ellis Jay; Grandmaster Flash; Guy; Ice-T; Keith Sweat; Mike "Mike Fresh" McCray; Randy Ran; Rodney "Kool Collie" Terry; Stanley Brown; Teddy Riley; Bernard Belle; Vassal Benford

Singles from New Jack City
- 1. "I'm Dreamin'" Released: February 20, 1991; 2. "I Wanna Sex You Up" Released: March 2, 1991

Professional ratings
Review scores
Source	Rating
AllMusic	3.5/5 stars
Robert Christgau	A−

Music from the Motion Picture New Jack City is the original soundtrack to Mario Van Peebles' 1991 film New Jack City. It was released by Giant Records through Reprise Records, and distributed by Warner Bros. Records. The soundtrack consists of eleven original songs, most of which were performed by chart-topping R&B and hip-hop artists of the time. The music is heavily influenced by the New Jack Swing genre of R&B. Prominent artists and producers of this sound contributed to the soundtrack, including Guy with Teddy Riley, Keith Sweat, Color Me Badd, and Johnny Gill; Al B. Sure! produced the track "Get It Together (Black Is a Force)," performed by F.S. Effect.

The soundtrack reached No. 1 on the US Billboard Top R&B/Hip-Hop Albums chart for eight weeks, and No. 2 on the Billboard 200. The single "I'm Dreamin'," performed by Christopher Williams, and "For the Love of Money/Living for the City," performed by Troop, LeVert, and Queen Latifah, reached No. 1 and No. 12 on the Billboard Hot R&B/Hip-Hop Songs chart, respectively.

The Troop/LeVert/Queen Latifah song was a medley of The O'Jays' "For the Love of Money" and Stevie Wonder's "Living for the City" (The O'Jays' lead singer is Eddie Levert, the father of two members of the group LeVert).

== Track listing ==
No.	Title	Writer(s)	Performer(s)	Length
1.	"New Jack Hustler (Nino's Theme)"	Tracy Lauren Marrow, Low Profile	Ice-T	4:25
2.	"I'm Dreamin'"	Stanley Brown, B. Durell Edwards	Christopher Williams	5:02
3.	"New Jack City"	Aaron Hall, Teddy Riley, Bernard Belle	Guy	3:30
4.	"I'm Still Waiting"	H. Randall Davis	Johnny Gill	3:58
5.	"(There You Go) Tellin' Me No Again"	Keith Sweat, Bobby Wooten	Keith Sweat	5:03
6.	"Facts of Life"	Carl McIntosh, T. Jacobs, Danny Madden, Keith Nicholas	Danny Madden	4:13
7.	"For the Love of Money / Living for the City"	Kenneth Gamble, Leon Huff, Anthony Jackson, Stevie Wonder	Troop and LeVert featuring Queen Latifah	5:45
8.	"I Wanna Sex You Up"	Elliot Straite	Color Me Badd	4:03
9.	"Lyrics 2 the Rhythm"	Joseph Saddler, Tyrone Armstrong, Ray Smith, Teena Marie, Tamara Hutchinson	Essence	4:06
10.	"Get It Together (Black Is A Force)"	Amery Ware, Al B. Sure!, Joseph Brim	F.S. Effect	4:24
11.	"In the Dust"	Chris Wong Wong, Mark Ross, Luther Campbell, Michael McCray, Rodney Terry	2 Live Crew	3:54

== Personnel ==
- Doug McHenry — executive producer
- George Jackson — executive producer
- Benny Medina — executive producer
- Cassandra Mills — executive producer
- Teddy Riley — producer, arranger
- Bernard Belle - producer

== Charts ==
Chart (1991)	Peak position
US Billboard 200	2
US Billboard R&B Albums	1

== Singles ==
Year	Title	US Pop	US R&B	UK
1991	"Facts of Life"	—	91	—
1991	"For the Love of Money"/"Living for the City"	—	12	—
1991	"I'm Dreamin'"	89	1	—
1991	"I Wanna Sex You Up"	2	1	1
1991	"I'm Still Waiting"	—	27	—
1991	"New Jack Hustler (Nino's Theme)"	67	49	—

== Certifications ==
Region	Certification	Certified units/sales
United States (RIAA)	Platinum	1,000,000^{^}
^{^} Shipments figures based on certification alone.

== See also ==
- List of number-one R&B albums of 1991 (U.S.)
