= J. D. Lawrence (playwright) =

American dramatist

- Born: August 6, 1967 (age 59)
- Occupations: Film producer, film writer and album artist

Jaron D. "J. D." Lawrence (born August 6, 1967) is an American writer, director and producer of films, television and urban stage plays. On April 1, 2018, he released the drama series Your Husband Is Cheating On Us, which was premiered on Bravo TV.

== Biography ==
Lawrence grew up in Amityville, New York. He and his family have launched more than 20 productions, debuting in theaters across the US. In his one-man play SKITZophrenia Lawrence set a Guinness World Record for "Most Characters Played by One Actor in a Single Theatre". He played 72 different character in the 90-minute production.

== Productions ==
- The Clean Up Woman (2009)
- Community Service (2013)
- Fire Fighter Fitness (2015)
- Your Husband Is Cheating on Us (2018)

== Acting ==
- The Clean Up Woman (2010)
- Community Service (2013)
- I Really Hate My Ex (2015)
- Red Oaks (2015)
- Your Husband Is Cheating on Us (2018)
- Martin, Malcolm & Me (2019)

== Albums ==
- I'm a survivor (2018)
- Your Husband Is Cheating on Us (2018)

== Awards ==
Lawrence won a Telly Award for his local cable broadcast The J.D. Lawrence Show.
