= Jackée Harry =

American actress (born 1956)

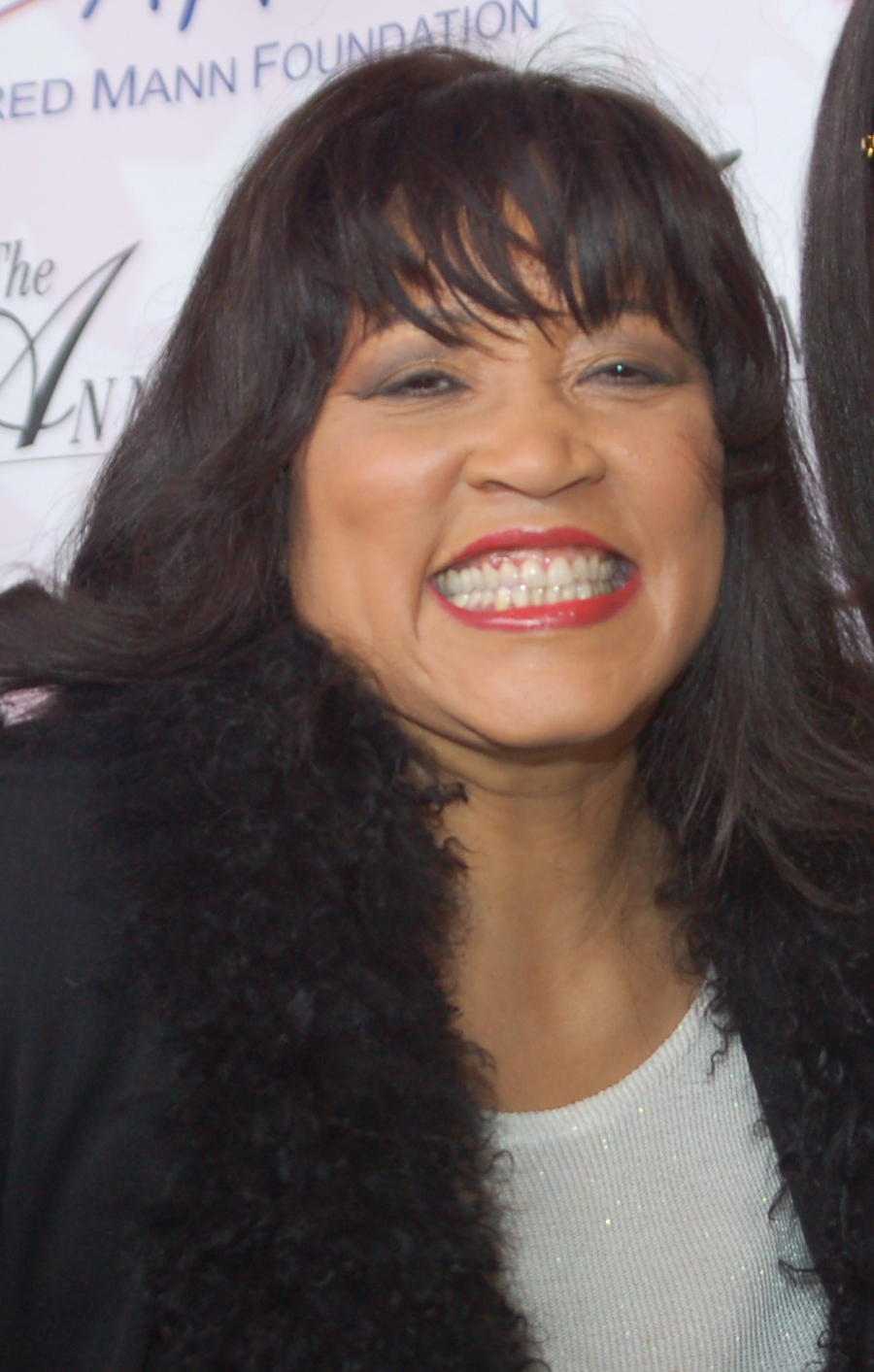
- Harry at a December 2010 performance of The Hot Chocolate Nutcracker
- Born: Jacqueline Yvonne Harry; August 14, 1956 (age 70); Winston-Salem, North Carolina, U.S.
- Education: Long Island University, Post (BA)
- Occupations: Actress; comedian; television personality
- Years active: 1978–present
- Spouses: Jerry Jemmott (m. 1980; div. 1984) Elgin Charles Williams (m. 1996; div. 2003)
- Children: 1
- Awards: 1987 – Emmy Award for Outstanding Supporting Actress in a Comedy Series Sandra Clark (227); 1999 – NAACP Image Award for Outstanding Supporting Actress in a Comedy Series Lisa Landry (Sister, Sister); 2000 – NAACP Image Award for Outstanding Supporting Actress in a Comedy Series Lisa Landry (Sister, Sister)
- Website: Official website

Jacqueline Yvonne "Jackée" Harry (born August 14, 1956) is an American actress, comedian, and television personality. She starred as Sandra Clark, the nemesis of Mary Jenkins (played by Marla Gibbs), on the NBC sitcom 227 (1985–1990), and as Lisa Landry on the ABC/The WB sitcom Sister, Sister (1994–1999). Harry was the first African American to win a Primetime Emmy Award for Outstanding Supporting Actress in a Comedy Series.

She also starred in the 1992 film Ladybugs opposite Rodney Dangerfield. Since March 2021, she has played Paulina Price on the NBC/Peacock soap opera Days of Our Lives.

== Biography ==
=== Early life and education ===
Harry was born in Winston-Salem, North Carolina, in 1956 to an Afro-Trinidadian mother and African American father and raised in Harlem, New York. She began studying acting at the High School of the Performing Arts in midtown Manhattan in New York City. Harry graduated from Long Island University with a Bachelor of Arts degree in education and worked as a teacher of American history at Brooklyn Technical High School for two years before beginning a career on the New York stage.

=== Career ===
==== Theater ====
In 1978, Harry made her Broadway debut in A Broadway Musical. Throughout the 1980s she starred in numerous productions both on and off Broadway and in national touring productions. In 1994, Harry made her return to the theater by starring as Billie Holiday in the play Lady Day at Emerson's Bar and Grill. Following that stage production, she fulfilled the role of "madam who runs a bordello" in the Broadway musical The Boys from Syracuse. In the mid 2000s, she appeared in stage productions of The Sunshine Boys, Damn Yankees, and A Christmas Carol. She also toured nationally in JD Lawrence's The Clean Up Woman.

==== Television ====
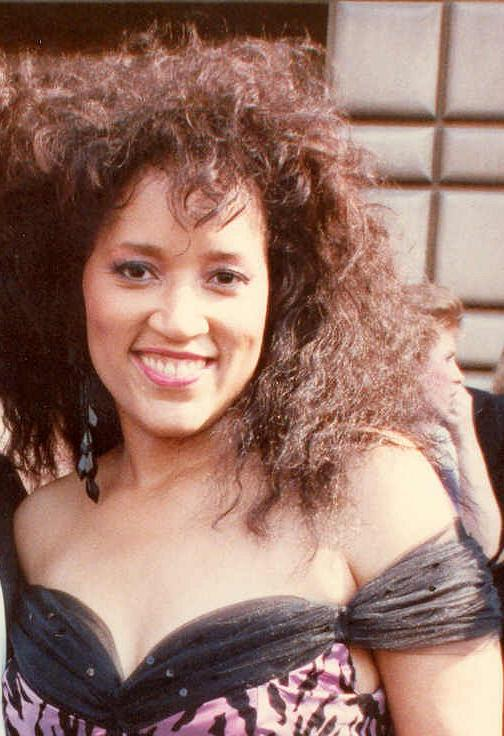
Harry attending the 40th Primetime Emmy Awards in August 1988

Harry made her television acting debut in 1983 on Another World as Lily Mason, a role she continued until 1986. In 1984, she made her motion pictures debuts with bit parts in Moscow on the Hudson and The Cotton Club. In 1985, Harry began a co-starring role as Sandra Clark on the NBC sitcom 227. Her mother, Flossie, celebrated her getting the role but died before the show started airing. During the series' run, Harry and Marla Gibbs began feuding privately over who was the series' lead. They have since reconciled and collaborated on a number of projects. Her performance on 227 inspired NBC producers to create a television pilot for her entitled Jackée. Although the pilot episode was a success with audiences, the series did not last and the episode is now shown as an episode of 227.

After leaving 227 in 1989, Harry starred opposite Oprah Winfrey in The Women of Brewster Place, an adaptation of Gloria Naylor's novel of the same name. In 1990, she headlined an NBC comedy pilot from Witt/Thomas titled We'll Take Manhattan; it aired as a summer special that year, but did not make it to series. In late 1991, she joined the cast of The Royal Family after the star, Redd Foxx, unexpectedly died. She starred opposite two-time 227 guest-star Della Reese, but the series faltered in the ratings and was not renewed for a second season. In 1992, she starred as the assistant coach in Ladybugs. Harry served as a guest panelist on the 2000 revival of To Tell the Truth and appeared on the second season of VH1's Celebrity Fit Club 2 in 2005. From 1994 until 1999, Harry played Lisa Landry, the adoptive mother of Tia Mowry's character, on the sitcom Sister, Sister.

She had a recurring role as Vanessa on the UPN/The CW series Everybody Hates Chris and had a recurring role on the BET Series Let's Stay Together. From 2012 to 2015, she starred in Byron Allen's sitcom The First Family. In 2013, she appeared in the pilot episode of the Disney sitcom Girl Meets World, as well as the episodes "Girl Meets Crazy Hat" and "Girl Meets Demolition". That same year, she also joined Gibbs in the movie Forbidden Woman. In 2014, she made a guest appearance on Instant Mom as her character Lisa Landry. She appeared in the 2 Broke Girls episode "And the Sax Problem" in 2016, as Earl's (Garrett Morris) ex-girlfriend.

On December 8, 2020, during an appearance on Today, Harry announced that she was set to join the cast of the soap opera Days of Our Lives. Harry was cast as Paulina Price. When the series was renewed for two additional seasons in 2021, Harry was placed on contract with the series. On July 25, 2021, she appeared on Celebrity Family Feud.

Harry guest starred in The Neighborhood season 7, playing Tina's stepmother, Loretta, in the episode "Welcome to the Wicked Stepmother," where Tina's father visits and she discovers he has age-related impairments.

== Personal life ==
Harry has one adopted child and was once married to arranger and conductor Jerry Jemmott. In 1996, Harry married Elgin Charles Williams; they later divorced in 2003. During their marriage, Harry and Williams adopted a son, Frank, in 1997.

== Filmography ==
=== Film ===
Year	Film	Role	Notes
1984	Moscow on the Hudson	Woman	
1984	The Cotton Club	Susan	
1986	Alvin Goes Back to School	Gina Lipman	TV movie
1987	Alf Loves a Mystery	Countess	TV movie
1988	Crash Course	Edna Savage	TV movie
1989	Double Your Pleasure	Linda/Sharlene Cavanaugh	TV movie
1990	We'll Take Manhattan	Yvonne Johnson	TV movie
1992	Ladybugs	Julie Benson	
1993	Living and Working in Space: The Countdown Has Begun	Charmayne Harry	Video
1997	Mother Goose: A Rappin' and Rhymin' Special	Little Bo Peep (voice)	TV movie
2003	The Nick at Nite Holiday Special	Jackée, The Baker	TV movie
2004	You Got Served	Elizabeth "Mama' Smith	
2006	All You've Got	Pauline	TV movie
2007	The Last Day of Summer	Lola the Lobster	TV movie
2009	Man of Her Dreams	Louise Smith	
2009	G.E.D.	Mama Jones	
2010	Christmas Cupid	Vivian	TV movie
2010	The Clean Up Woman	Jasmine	
2010	Knight to D7	Nurse Hamilton	Short
2011	The Ideal Husband	Vivian Peterson	TV movie
2011	Nurse Jackée	Nurse Jackée	Short
2011	Shadow Hills	Sonya	TV movie
2012	Switchin' the Script	Mrs. Shepard	
2012	The Coalition	Grandmother Bea Hathaway	Video
2012	JD Lawrence's the Clean Up Woman	Jasmine	TV movie
2012	Brother White	Veena	TV movie
2013	The Sins of Deacon Whyles	Mama Whyles	
2013	The Love Letter	Josephine	TV movie
2013	Forbidden Woman	Sheila	
2014	Knock 'Em Dead	Savannah Johnz	
2014	The Dirty 30	Linda	
2015	The Man in 3B	Miss Gina Bertha	
2016	Ladies Book Club	Mrs. Roxanne Charles	TV movie
2016	Just Love	Vernette	TV movie
2016	Broadcasting Christmas	Veronika Daniels	TV movie
2016	A Husband for Christmas	Erin	TV movie
2016	Hail Mary	Nurse Wanda	TV movie
2017	Cupid's Proxy	Olive	
2017	Wrapped Up in Christmas	Arlene Simons	TV movie
2018	It's a Date	Allison Cole	
2018	When It Comes Around	Amina	
2018	My Christmas Inn	Susan Taylor	TV movie
2019	Pride & Prejudice: Atlanta	Mrs. Bennet	TV movie
2019	The Wrong Tutor	Principal Callahan	TV movie
2019	Carole's Christmas	Iris	TV movie
2019	A Family Reunion Christmas	Aunt Dot	TV movie
2019	Christmas on My Mind	Dr. Caroline Albright	TV movie
2020	Love in Store	Sharon St. Clair	TV movie
2020	The Wrong Wedding Planner	Ms. Johnson	TV movie
2020	The Perfect Mate	Mrs. Adams	
2020	A Christmas for Mary	Deborah	TV movie
2021	Deceived by My Mother-in-Law	Denise	TV movie
2021	Mommy's Deadly Con Artist	Denise	TV movie
2021	The Wrong Cheer Captain	Principal Simpson	TV movie
2021	Days of Our Lives: A Very Salem Christmas	Paulina Price	
2022	Killer Design	Dr. Farber	TV movie
2023	A Snowy Day in Oakland	Mrs. Monroe	
2023	Every Breath She Takes	Linda Moss	TV movie
2023	If I Can't Have You	Detective Olsen	TV movie
2023	So Fly Christmas	Harriet	TV movie
2024	Tall, Dark, and Dangerous	Detective Graham	TV movie
2024	The Gutter	Mozell	
2024	Million Dollar Lethal Listing	Meghan	TV movie
2024	Make or Bake Christmas	Denise	TV movie
2024	Too Many Christmases	Harriet	

=== Television ===
Year	Show	Role	Notes
1983–1986	Another World	Lily Mason	Regular Cast
1985–1986	Pyramid	Herself/Celebrity Contestant	Recurring Guest
1985–1989	227	Sandra Clark	Main Cast: Season 1–4, Recurring Cast: Season 5
1986	Super Password	Herself/Celebrity Contestant	Recurring Guest
1986–1987	The New Hollywood Squares	Herself/Panelist	Recurring Guest
1987	Friday Night Videos	Herself	Episode: "May 1, 1987"
1987	Win, Lose or Draw	Herself	Episode: "September 14, 1987"
1987	The Wil Shriner Show	Herself	Episode: "Episode #1.6"
1987	Dolly	Herself	Episode: "Episode #1.6"
1988	One to Grow On	Herself	Episode: "Self-Confidence" & "Telling Whoppers"
1988	Amen	Roxanne Farley	Episode: "A Slight Case of Murder: Part 1 & 2"
1988–1989	American Black Achievement Awards	Herself/Host	Main Host
1989	The Women of Brewster Place	Etta Mae Johnson	Episode: "Episode #1.1" & "#1.2"
1989	Amen	Florence Hawkins	Episode: "Don't Rain on My Shower"
1990–1991	An Evening at the Improv	Herself	Episode: "Episode #6.12" & "#7.22"
1991–1992	The Royal Family	Ruth 'CoCo' Royal	Main Cast
1992	It's Showtime at the Apollo	Herself/Guest Host	Episode: "Episode #5.15" & "#5.16"
1992	Designing Women	Vanessa Chamberlain	Episode: "Shades of Vanessa"
1994	Soul Train	Herself/Guest Host	Episode: "Lalah Hathaway/Melvin Riley/Immature"
1994	Dave's World	Estelle	Episode: "Saved by Estelle"
1994–1999	Sister, Sister	Lisa Landry	Main Cast
1995–1997	Happily Ever After: Fairy Tales for Every Child	Little Bo Peep/Giant's Wife (voice)	Episode: "Jack and the Beanstalk" & "Mother Goose"
1998–2004	Hollywood Squares	Herself/Panelist	Recurring Guest
2000	Twice in a Lifetime	Darcy Green/Louise Lutrelle	Episode: "Used Hearts"
2003	7th Heaven	Ms. Beane	Episode: "It's Not Always About You"
2005	Celebrity Fit Club	Herself	Main Cast: Season 2
2005	That's So Raven	Dava	Episode: "Goin' Hollywood"
2005	One on One	Sherri St. Croix	Episode: "Waiting for Huffman"
2006	VH1: All Access	Herself	Episode: "Where Are They Now?: Celebrity Fit Club"
2006–2009	Everybody Hates Chris	Vanessa	Guest: Season 1, Recurring Cast: Season 2-4
2007	The A-List	Herself	Episode: "Flirts"
2008	The Mighty B!	Nurse (voice)	Episode: "Bee Patients"
2009	Split Ends	Herself	Episode: "Shi Salon and Elgin Charles"
2010	RuPaul's Drag U	Herself/Faculty	Episode: "Plump and Circumstance"
2010	Friends & Lovers	Omar's Mother	Episode: "Episode #1.3 & #1.4"
2011	Beverly Hills Fabulous	Herself	Recurring Cast
2011	Life After	Herself	Recurring Guest
2011	She's Still Not Our Sister	Connie	Main Cast
2011–2012	Tia & Tamera	Herself	Recurring Cast: Season 1, Guest: Season 2
2011–2013	Let's Stay Together	Delores Whitmore	Recurring Cast: Season 1-2, Guest: Season 3
2012	Who Wants to Be a Millionaire	Herself/Celebrity Contestant	Episode: "Celebrity Week for Alzheimer's 4"
2012	For Richer or Poorer	Mrs. Henderson	Episode: "Ex Files" & "The Switch"
2012	Are We There Yet?	Jackée	Episode: "The Ghost Dog Episode"
2012–2015	The First Family	Pauletta Birdsong	Main Cast
2013	Celebrity Ghost Stories	Herself	Episode: "Jackee Harry/Louie Anderson/Angie Stone/Richard Burgi"
2013	Braxton Family Values	Herself	Episode: "A Diva's Dilemma"
2013	American Dad!	Wanda (voice)	Episode: "For Black Eyes Only"
2013	How to Live with Your Parents...	Jessoka	Episode: "How to Help the Needy"
2014	Glee	Herself	Episode: "City of Angels"
2014	Instant Mom	Lisa Landry	Episode: "Not Your Mother's Day"
2014	One Love	Nurse Beverly	Episode: "Tea-Ball"
2014	Family Time	Gladys	Episode: "Hospitality"
2014–2015	Girl Meets World	Evelyn Rand	Recurring Cast: Season 1
2015	Celebrity Wife Swap	Herself	Episode: "Jackee Harry/Traci Lords"
2015	New Money	Herself	Episode: "Don't Go Jetskiing with 30 Pounds of Gold On"
2015	Chopped	Herself/Contestant	Episode: "Sitcom Moms"
2015	Celebrity Food Fight	Herself	Episode: "Merry Feastmas"
2015	In the Cut	Nadine Weaver	Main Cast: Season 1
2015	Transformers: Robots in Disguise	Zizza (voice)	Episode: "The Buzz on Windblade"
2015	Young & Hungry	JoJo	Episode: "Young & Christmas"
2015–2016	Guilty Pleasures	Herself	Recurring Cast: Season 1, Guest: Season 2
2015–2017	Baby Daddy	Judge Earlene Johnson	Guest Cast: Season 4-6
2016	Gay for Play Game Show Starring RuPaul	Herself	Episode: "Featuring the Cast of 227"
2016	Botched	Herself	Episode: "Pinched Perfect"
2016	Unsung Hollywood	Herself	Episode: "Tim Reid"
2016	2 Broke Girls	Ruby	Episode: "And the Sax Problem"
2017	Battle of the Network Stars	Herself/Contestant	Episode: "TV Moms & Dads vs. TV Kids"
2017	The Thundermans	Officer Bosco	Episode: "Orange Is the New Max"
2017–2024	Funny You Should Ask	Herself	Recurring Guest
2018	K.C. Undercover	Betty/Midge Turner	Episode: "The Gammy Files"
2018	Rob Riggle's Ski Master Academy	Hog Queen	Episode: "Hog Hunt"
2018	Malibu Dan the Family Man	Mrs. Leopard	Episode: "Macaroni and Sneeze"
2018	The Paynes	JoAnn Payne	Main Cast
2019	The Cool Kids	Lorraine	Episode: "Funeral Crashers" & "Vegas, Baby!"
2019	Live in Front of a Studio Audience	Diane	Episode: “Norman Lear's All in the Family and The Jeffersons”
2019	A Black Lady Sketch Show	Sandra Clark	Episode: "3rd & Bonaparte Is Always in the Shade"
2019	Family Reunion	Aunt Dot	Episode: “A Family Reunion Christmas”
2020–2022	For the Love of Jason	Patricia Grant	Recurring Cast
2021	Celebrity Family Feud	Herself/Celebrity Contestant	Episode: "Episode #8.6"
2021	Dad Stop Embarrassing Me!	Aunt Elizabeth	Episode: "#ThrillaOnTheGrilla"
2021	Pose	Jada	Episode: "Take Me To Church"
2021	Days of Our Lives: Beyond Salem	Paulina Price	Main Cast: Season 1
2021–	Days of Our Lives	Paulina Price	Regular Cast
2022	Soul of a Nation	Herself	Episode: "Screen Queens Rising"
2022	Everything's Trash	Zora	Recurring Cast
2022	Tuca & Bertie	Tuca's Mother (voice)	Episode: "The Mole"
2023	The $100,000 Pyramid	Herself/Celebrity Contestant	Episode: "Episode #7.8"
2023	A Black Lady Sketch Show	Queen Gladys Knight	Episode: "My Love Language Is Words of Defamation"
2023	Human Resources	Deb (voice)	Episode: "Paul Me By Your Name"'
2023	As Luck Would Have It	Gabbi Luck	Main Cast
2024	TV on the Edge: Moments That Shaped Our Culture	Herself	Episode: "Oprah's Wagon Of Fat"
2024	Tia Mowry: My Next Act	Herself	Episode: "TV Mama Knows Best"
2024	Clone High	Jackée the Ripper (voice)	Recurring Cast: Season 3
2024	Moon Girl and Devil Dinosaur	Merle (voice)	2 episodes
2024	Zombies: The Re-Animated Series	Mothership (voice)	Episode: "Reality Check, Please!/Their Guy Sasquatch"
2024	Everybody Still Hates Chris	Vanessa (voice)	Recurring Cast
2024	The Neighborhood	Loretta	Episode: "Welcome to the Wicked Stepmother"
2025–present	Iron Man and His Awesome Friends	Granny Williams	Recurring role
2025	A Man on the Inside	Joy Taylor	Guest Cast: Season 2

== Awards and nominations ==
Year	Award	Category	Nominated work	Result	Ref.
1987	Primetime Emmy Awards	Outstanding Supporting Actress in a Comedy Series	227	Won	
1988	Primetime Emmy Awards	Outstanding Supporting Actress in a Comedy Series	227	Nominated	
1989	Golden Globe Awards	Best Supporting Actress – Series, Miniseries or Television Film	227	Nominated	
2016	Nollywood and African Film Critics Awards	Best Actress Independent Film	The Man in 3B	Nominated	
1999	NAACP Image Awards	Outstanding Supporting Actress in a Comedy Series	Sister, Sister	Won	
2000	NAACP Image Awards	Outstanding Supporting Actress in a Comedy Series	Sister, Sister	Won	
2021	Online Film & Television Association Awards	Best Guest Actress in a Drama Series	Pose	Nominated	
