= Barry Sobel =

American actor and comedian (born 1959)

- Born: July 11, 1959 (age 66); New York City, United States
- Occupations: Comedy writer (1980–present); Television actor (1989–present)

Barry Sobel (born July 11, 1959) is an American actor and comedian.

== Life and career ==
Sobel was raised in a Jewish family in Brooklyn, New York. During the 1980s, he toured the comedy circuit heavily. In 1987, he appeared in Rodney Dangerfield's Young Comedians special.

Sobel played a part in Revenge of the Nerds II: Nerds in Paradise. He also appeared in the 1987 film Blind Date. He adopted his hip-hop comedy rap in 1987 when he was featured on HBO's Uptown Comedy Express. Sobel was a guest on The Tonight Show Starring Johnny Carson, in the episode July 24, 1987. In his guest-starring appearance, he provided a comedy act while sitting at the desk next to Johnny on one side & actor Mark Harmon on the other.

In the 1988 film, Punchline, he had a small part, but played a more prominent off screen role as comedic advisor to Tom Hanks. According to Sobel, Hanks caught his act which stylistically was considered 'dangerous' as was the character Hanks was to play in Punchline.

Sobel was a series regular on ABC's The Ellen Burstyn Show in 1986, and was added to the cast of 227 in its fourth season. In the 1990s, he did voice-over work as himself on Dr. Katz, Professional Therapist. From 1998 to 2000, he co-starred with Wayne Brady on the VH1 series Vinyl Justice, a parody of Cops in which both played police officers who raided citizens' private music collections and made wisecracks about them. Around this time, Sobel also guest starred as an angel on The Parent 'Hood. He voiced the character of Chico on the series The Boondocks.

In 2001, Sobel was nominated for an Primetime Emmy Award for his writing work on Saturday Night Live. In 2008, he appeared in commercials in scenes from Comedy Central's then-new show, Chocolate News, starring David Alan Grier.
