= List of Good Times episodes =

The sitcom series Good Times, which originally aired on CBS from February 8, 1974, to August 1, 1979, has 133 episodes, three of which were not shown during the original network run but turned up in the syndication package.

== Series overview ==
Season	Episodes	Originally released	
Season	Episodes	First released	Last released
1	13	February 8, 1974	May 10, 1974
2	24	September 10, 1974	March 18, 1975
3	24	September 9, 1975	March 2, 1976
4	24	September 22, 1976	March 30, 1977
5	24	September 21, 1977	April 3, 1978
6	24	September 16, 1978	August 1, 1979

== Episodes ==
=== Season 1 (1974) ===
No. overall	No. in season	Title	Directed by	Written by	Original release date	Tape date
1	1	"Too Old Blues"	Bob LaHendro and Donald McKayle	Bob Peete	February 8, 1974	January 24, 1974
James (John Amos) is excited because he is sure that he is going to get a high paying job. However, at the interview, he learns that he is too old to join the company's union. Meanwhile, Florida (Esther Rolle) and the children (BernNadette Stanis, Jimmie Walker, and Ralph Carter) get ahead of themselves and throw a celebration party for James unaware that he was rejected. Note: This episode was taped after the pilot to add additional characters and to provide background for those in the pilot episode.
2	2	"Black Jesus"	Bob LaHendro and John Rich	Kurt Taylor and John Donley	February 15, 1974	January 17, 1974
J.J.'s painting of a Black Jesus, becomes the family's good luck charm after a string of success for each family member. However, Florida refuses to entertain the notion that the painting had anything to do with the recent string of "good times". Creator Eric Monte appears as Numbers Runner. Note: This episode was taped after the pilot to add additional characters and to provide background for those in the pilot episode. In 2009, TV Guide ranked this episode #83 on its list of the 100 Greatest Episodes.
3	3	"Getting Up the Rent (The Pilot)"	Donald McKayle and Perry Rosemond	Eric Monte	February 22, 1974	January 10, 1974
With an eviction notice over their heads, the Evans family scrambles to come up with $74 needed for their rent. Despite Florida's opinion, James goes down to the pool hall to try to hustle some money; J.J. comes up with a scheme of his own and Florida and Willona go down to the welfare office. Guest star: Matthew "Stymie" Beard (former Our Gang child actor) as Monty and Hal Williams as one of the movers
4	4	"God's Business Is Good Business"	Bob LaHendro and Donald McKayle	Roland Wolpert	March 1, 1974	January 31, 1974
An old friend of James, who is now a shady televangelist (Roscoe Lee Browne), stops by the Evans apartment and offers James a job that would pay $100 a day. James is set to take it, but Florida is against James accepting the job, believing it goes against his morals and values.
5	5	"Michael Gets Suspended" "The Midget Strikes Back"	Herbert Kenwith	Eric Monte	March 8, 1974	February 14, 1974
Michael comes home from school early one day with the announcement that he has been suspended as a result of telling his teacher that George Washington was a racist because he owned slaves. James and Florida become determined to prove to Michael that he is wrong.
6	6	"Sex and the Evans Family"	Herbert Kenwith	Story by : Donald L. Stewart; Teleplay by : Norman Paul and Jack Elinson	March 15, 1974	February 28, 1974
Florida finds what she believes to be a dirty story called, "Sexual Behavior in the Ghetto". Assuming it to be J.J.'s, Florida confronts him, but she is in for a surprise when Thelma claims it and has an even bigger surprise when she learns it belongs to Thelma's latest boyfriend (Philip Michael Thomas).
7	7	"Junior Gets a Patron"	Herbert Kenwith	Larry Siegel	March 22, 1974	February 21, 1974
J.J. is sure he is bound to make it big when he finds a patron in Leroy Jackson (Ed Cambridge), who begins providing him with all the supplies he needs. However, when James discovers who the patron is, he forbids J.J. to be associated with him and J.J. responds by moving out. This leads to a confrontation at J.J.'s new apartment between James and Leroy. Note: Ja'net DuBois does not appear in the episode
8	8	"Junior the Senior"	Herbert Kenwith	Story by : Ken Hecht & Lloyd Garver; Teleplay by : Ken Hecht & Lloyd Garver and Lou Derman & Bill Davenport	March 29, 1974	March 7, 1974
Florida and James are worried that J.J. will not pass into the 12th grade. When he gets his report card, he did indeed pass, but the grades seem to be a far cry from what they should be. This leads James and Florida to do a little investigating.
9	9	"The Visitor"	Herbert Kenwith	Story by : Bob Wolterstorf, Allessandro R. Veith and Thad Mumford; Teleplay by : Norman Paul and Jack Elinson	April 5, 1974	March 21, 1974
Michael submits an angry letter about the conditions in the Evans' apartment to a newspaper and gets an immediate response from a housing commission official who quickly finds himself stranded in the ghetto and experiences the conditions first hand.
10	10	"Springtime in the Ghetto"	Herbert Kenwith	Norman Paul and Jack Elinson	April 19, 1974	March 28, 1974
Florida is running in a cleanest apartment competition and is sure she will win. However, her chances are dashed when Michael tries to help someone in need and brings home Ned the Wino.
11	11	"The TV Commercial"	Herbert Kenwith	Story by : Simon Muntner, Lou Derman and Bill Davenport; Teleplay by : Lou Derman and Bill Davenport	April 26, 1974	April 4, 1974
Florida comes home from the supermarket with great news – she has been offered a role in a TV commercial. What is even better is the pay she will get – $5,000. However, once she reads the script and tests the product, Florida has second thoughts.
12	12	"The Checkup" "James Goes Down"	Herbert Kenwith	Kurt Taylor and John Donley	May 3, 1974	April 11, 1974
Florida and the children become concerned about James' health after reading an article in a magazine about hypertension. When he learns about their concerns, he goes through the roof and refuses to go for a check up.
13	13	"My Son, the Lover" "I Love Marcy"	Herbert Kenwith	Story by : Lou Derman & Bill Davenport; Teleplay by : Lou Derman & Bill Davenport and Norman Paul & Jack Elinson	May 10, 1974	April 18, 1974
A popular girl wants J.J. to paint her portrait and J.J. mistakenly assumes that they will become more serious when he makes plans to ask her to go steady. However, Florida and Thelma smell a rat. Note: Ralph Carter does not appear in this episode

=== Season 2 (1974–1975) ===
No. overall	No. in season	Title	Directed by	Written by	Original release date	Tape date
14	1	"Florida Flips"	Herbert Kenwith	Story by : Jack Elinson & Norman Paul and John Donley & Kurt Taylor; Teleplay by : Jack Elinson & Norman Paul	September 10, 1974	July 18, 1974
Florida's strange behavior has the family and Willona wondering what is wrong with her. Michael thinks that she is beginning menopause, while Willona believes that she is fed up with the boredom that comes with being a housewife. Guest star: Helen Martin as Wanda
15	2	"J.J. Becomes a Man: Part 1" "J.J. Is Arrested: Part 1"	Herbert Kenwith	Jack Elinson & Norman Paul	September 17, 1974	August 1, 1974
After his birthday party, J.J. is arrested on suspicion of robbing a liquor store.
16	3	"J.J. Becomes a Man: Part 2" "J.J. Is Arrested: Part 2"	Herbert Kenwith	Jack Elinson & Norman Paul	September 24, 1974	August 15, 1974
Desperate to raise bail to free J.J., the family considers taking money from a loan shark, the real robber is caught and J.J. is released from jail. Mel Stewart guest stars.
17	4	"Crosstown Buses Run All Day, Doodah, Doodah"	Herbert Kenwith	Roger Shulman & John Baskin	October 1, 1974	July 25, 1974
To avoid being bused to a white neighborhood, Michael forges his parents' names on a questionnaire. His principal (Ron Glass) arrives to question Florida and James about their responses. Note: Ja'net DuBois does not appear in the episode.
18	5	"The Man I Most Admire"	Herbert Kenwith	Michael Morris	October 8, 1974	August 8, 1974
Michael must write an essay on the person he most admires. He first picks Florida for her strength and effort in keeping the family together. However, Florida points out that James may be the best person. However, James' recent actions in applying for a new job leave little to be admired.
19	6	"Thelma's Young Man"	Herbert Kenwith	Story by : Roland Wolpert; Teleplay by : Roger Shulman & John Baskin	October 15, 1974	September 12, 1974
Thelma has been seeing the same man (Louis Gossett Jr.) for two months and has not introduced him to the family yet. However, when she comes home with an engagement ring, Florida and James demand that they meet him and they are in for a surprise when they finally do.
20	7	"The I.Q. Test"	Herbert Kenwith	Jay Moriarty & Mike Milligan	October 22, 1974	September 5, 1974
Michael, one of the brightest boys in his class, comes home with the news that he scored the lowest out of his whole class on an I.Q. test. Infuriated at first, Florida and James hear Michael out and realize that I.Q. tests are designed for certain demographics and in this case exclude black people. Meanwhile, J.J. prepares for a wild date with his latest girl, Henrietta. Guest star: Austin Pendleton as the I.Q. test creator
21	8	"The Encyclopedia Hustle"	Herbert Kenwith	Bob Shayne & Eric Cohen	October 29, 1974	August 29, 1974
An encyclopedia salesman (Ron Glass) is the last person James wants to see when he comes home from work. However, he softens when he learns the man is blind. This leads James to sign a contract and he reads the fine print only after the man leaves.
22	9	"The Gang: Part 1" "J.J. and the Gang: Part 1"	Herbert Kenwith	Story by : Eric Monte; Teleplay by : Eric Monte & Allan Manings and Jack Elinson & Norman Paul	November 12, 1974	October 17, 1974
J.J. has secretly become a member of the Satan's Knights, a gang who are in the midst of a gang war with the Warlords. Two members and the leader of the Satan's Knights arrive at the Evans' home to escort a scared J.J. to a meeting place where the two gangs are to meet. However, on the way there they run into James and Florida and an altercation leaves J.J. shot. Note: Ja'net DuBois does not appear in the episode.
23	10	"The Gang: Part 2" "J.J. and the Gang: Part 2"	Herbert Kenwith	Story by : Eric Monte; Teleplay by : Eric Monte and Jack Elinson & Norman Paul	November 19, 1974	October 31, 1974
J.J. is recovering after being shot by Mad Dog, which turned out to be only a flesh wound. Meanwhile, a vengeful James presses charges against Mad Dog but a worried Florida is afraid that James's anger will take over before the law does. Guest Star: Lynn Hamilton as Mad Dog’s mother; Mrs. Edwards.
24	11	"Florida, the Matchmaker"	Herbert Kenwith	Norman Paul & Jack Elinson	November 26, 1974	October 3, 1974
A wedding has Florida realizing that Willona is the only friend of hers left who is not married. This leads Florida to try her hand at matchmaking, and she matches Willona with Duane, a friend of James'. However, Florida is a little crestfallen, when Duane leaves the wedding early, claiming he does not feel well and she thinks her matchmaking plans have failed, until they arrive the next day at the Evans door, together.
25	12	"The Windfall" "James Goes to Far..."	Herbert Kenwith	Allan Manings	December 3, 1974	October 10, 1974
James finds a bag of robbery loot adding up to $27,000. After some coaxing from Florida, James decides to turn it in. However, what Florida does not know is that there was $29,000 in the bag and James kept the other $2,000. James has no regrets especially after the only reward he was given was a $50 gift certificate for the supermarket.
26	13	"Sometimes There's No Bottom in the Bottle"	Herbert Kenwith	Larry Markes & Norm Liebmann	December 10, 1974	November 7, 1974
Cousin Naomi is visiting the Evans' for the Christmas season and the whole time she has been there, has been time spent in the bathroom. However, her visit is not a happy one for Thelma, who discovers that Naomi is hiding a serious drinking problem. Meanwhile, the rest of the Evans family prepares for holiday festivities.
27	14	"Florida's Big Gig"	Herbert Kenwith	Bob Peete	December 31, 1974	November 21, 1974
James is sure that he is going to get a sales position at a department store but when he brings Florida along to the interview he is in for a big surprise – the supervisor would rather hire Florida than him. It seems the supervisor would "kill two birds with one stone" hiring an African American woman. Guest stars: Dick O'Neill and Charlotte Rae
28	15	"Florida Goes to School"	Herbert Kenwith	Story by : Michael E. Coleman; Teleplay by : Roger Shulman & John Baskin	January 7, 1975	December 5, 1974
Florida comes home excited that she is going to night school hoping to achieve a High School Equivalency diploma, but working in the daytime and going to school at night puts a strain on her relationship with James, who is against her entertaining the notion of school. Featuring Hal Williams.
29	16	"The Nude" "Painting Naked Woman"	Herbert Kenwith	Story by : Barry E. Blitzer; Teleplay by : Dick Bensfield & Perry Grant	January 14, 1975	December 12, 1974
A woman, known in the projects as the "Wiggler" (Betty Bridges), asks J.J. to paint a nude portrait of her as a birthday gift for her husband (Carl Weathers). However, Florida has a hard time understanding why a woman would pose in the nude and why she has to pose in the Evans' apartment. Meanwhile, Florida is also not too happy that James is taking such a liking to "the Wiggler". Note: Ja'net DuBois does not appear in the episode: Bridges is also known for being the mother of Diff'rent Strokes star Todd Bridges
30	17	"The Family Business"	Herbert Kenwith	Story by : Alex Barris; Teleplay by : Allan Manings and Norman Paul & Jack Elinson	January 21, 1975	December 19, 1974
Realizing his mechanical skills, Florida suggests that James open a fix-it shop but when they go to the bank, they are turned down for a loan. This leads James to set up shop right in the apartment, despite a clause in the lease, and soon superintendent Nathan Bookman (which is his first appearance on the show) begins nosing around trying to put an end to the family business.
31	18	"The Debutante Ball"	Herbert Kenwith	Story by : Patricia Edwards; Teleplay by : Jack Elinson & Norman Paul	February 4, 1975	January 16, 1975
J.J. is enchanted with his new girlfriend, Clarissa (Rosanne Katon), and is all set to take her to a ritzy debutante ball. However, Clarissa has come to the Evans' apartment with some bad news – her parents will not let her go with J.J., saying that they think she is too good for him. Note: Ja'net DuBois does not appear in the episode.
32	19	"The Dinner Party" "Dog Food Lover"	Herbert Kenwith	Story by : Robert Fisher & Phil Naples; Teleplay by : Robert Fisher & Phil Naples and Allan Manings	February 11, 1975	January 23, 1975
An elderly resident of the projects appears to be living on pet food after Michael takes out her garbage. The Evans family's attempt to do something for her is complicated when she brings a meat loaf to dinner and the kids suspect it is made from dog food.
33	20	"The Houseguest"	Herbert Kenwith	Elon Packard & John Fenton Murray and Norman Paul & Jack Elinson	February 18, 1975	January 30, 1975
A childhood friend (Thalmus Rasulala) of James' arrives for a visit and quickly his gambling problem becomes an Evans family problem when two criminals show up looking for him to pay off a $5,000 debt. Meanwhile, with a house guest, J.J., Michael and James must learn to share the pull-out couch in the living room.
34	21	"My Girl Henrietta"	Herbert Kenwith	Bob Peete	February 25, 1975	February 13, 1975
Florida thinks it is strange that she has never met the often talked about Henrietta, J.J.'s girlfriend (Tina Andrews). So when she calls the Evans home, Florida invites her over for dinner. Meanwhile, J.J. announces that he has been thinking of asking Henrietta to marry him. This sends shock waves through the Evans household, but things really get touchy when Henrietta shows up at the door, pregnant. Note: Ja'net DuBois does not appear in the episode.
35	22	"The Enlistment"	Herbert Kenwith	Ben Joelson & Art Baer	March 4, 1975	February 20, 1975
While Florida is away in Cleveland for a family funeral, the Evans' family is hit with a double dose of unemployment after both James and J.J. lose their jobs. James' boss at Brady's puts him on a temporary lay-off and the movie theater where J.J. works is closing down. Wanting to support his family, J.J. decides to join the U.S. Army. Note: Esther Rolle and Ja'net DuBois do not appear in the episode. Guest star: William Christopher (Father Mulcahey on M*A*S*H)
36	23	"Thelma's Scholarship"	Herbert Kenwith	Perry Grant & Dick Bensfield	March 11, 1975	February 27, 1975
Thelma has a chance of winning a scholarship to an exclusive boarding school in Michigan. However, even before she knows she has won, a snobby girl from a sorority comes around wanting Thelma to join and quickly discovers they just want her because she is black.
37	24	"The Lunch Money Ripoff"	Herbert Kenwith	Roger Shulman & John Baskin	March 18, 1975	March 6, 1975
A small-fry extortionist named Eddie (Douglas Grant of The Electric Company) bullies Michael into handing over his lunch and milk money on a daily basis. When the rest of the family finds out, turmoil erupts as they argue about how Michael should deal with his bully of a classmate. Note: Ja'net DuBois does not appear in the episode.

=== Season 3 (1975–1976) ===
No. overall	No. in season	Title	Directed by	Written by	Original release date	Tape date
38	1	"A Real Cool Job"	Herbert Kenwith	Story by : Hubert Geiger; Teleplay by : Roger Shulman & John Baskin and Hubert Geiger	September 9, 1975	July 24, 1975
After taking some courses at a trade school, James has graduated and now has a chance at getting better paying jobs. However, James soon finds that he is still in the same old situation of having a hard time finding work. So, when he is finally offered a job, he accepts it despite the fact that there is one catch – it is in Alaska.
39	2	"The Family Gun" "James Goes Overboard"	Herbert Kenwith	Bob Peete	September 16, 1975	July 17, 1975
It seems crime has been at an all-time high in the neighborhood, causing the Evans family to take extra precautions, such as installing extra locks on their doors. However, James has taken a step that Florida and the children are not ready for – he has bought a gun. Later, when the gun disappears, all hell breaks loose, as James tears the apartment apart, looking for it.
40	3	"Operation Florida"	Herbert Kenwith	Dick Bensfield & Perry Grant	September 23, 1975	July 31, 1975
Florida has had a pain in her side for the last two weeks but does not want to see a doctor out of fear of the cost. However, when James learns of her dilemma he decides to pay any cost for Florida's treatment, even after he learns she has to have a gallbladder operation.
41	4	"Love in the Ghetto"	Herbert Kenwith	Perry Grant & Dick Bensfield	September 30, 1975	August 28, 1975
Thelma has great news – she is engaged to her latest boyfriend (Carl Franklin), but she is nervous about breaking the news to James and Florida. Later, her opinion of great news differs greatly with her parents who hit the roof after learning this, and in a surprise move, J.J. is on Thelma's side.
42	5	"Florida's Rich Cousin" "Cousin Edgar"	Herbert Kenwith	Roger Shulman & John Baskin	October 7, 1975	August 14, 1975
Florida plans on borrowing money from her cousin to help pay some unexpected bills. James's pride stands in the way causing him to storm out to a bar, leaving Florida to learn about the shocking news about her seemingly wealthy cousin by herself.
43	6	"The Weekend" "Happy Twentieth"	Herbert Kenwith	Norman Paul & Jack Elinson	October 14, 1975	September 4, 1975
A friend of James' gives him permission to use his cabin to celebrate his and Florida's 20th wedding anniversary. However, the trick is trying to get Florida to stop worrying about the children. While James and Florida are away, J.J. takes over the household by force and acts like a dictator.
44	7	"The Baby" "Bye-Bye, Baby"	Herbert Kenwith	Bruce Howard	October 21, 1975	September 18, 1975
While James is out of town, Florida and the children throw a baby shower for a friend, Loretta (Mary Alice). However, the joyous occasion is dampened when Loretta announces her plans of giving the baby up for adoption. Meanwhile, while Florida, Thelma and Willona go out shopping, Loretta goes into labor, leaving J.J. and Michael panicking. Note: John Amos does not appear in this episode.
45	8	"Michael's Big Fall"	Herbert Kenwith	Bob Peete	October 28, 1975	September 25, 1975
While James is out of town, Florida and her brother Wilbert are left to deal with a troubled Michael. Cutting classes, getting into fights at school, and low grades are all warning signs that lead Florida to make an appointment to see Michael's teacher. Note: John Amos does not appear in this episode. Guest star: Louis Gossett Jr.
46	9	"The Politicians" "Young Versus Old"	Herbert Kenwith	Jack Elinson & Norman Paul	November 4, 1975	August 21, 1975
A feud erupts in the Evans' household when James and J.J. take the side of Alderman Fred Davis during his attempt at re-election while Florida, Thelma and Willona take the side of his young opponent. It seems Davis is a shyster who gets nothing done in the neighborhood, which is why she cannot believe James would back such a loser. Note: In the 2019 ABC special Live in Front of a Studio Audience, John Amos portrayed the role of Alderman Davis, the only cast member to appear.
47	10	"Willona's Dilemma"	Herbert Kenwith	Roger Shulman & John Baskin	November 11, 1975	October 2, 1975
When J.J. brings home Walter, a man from his art class, he hits it off with Willona. Despite the fact that he is deaf, he and Willona begin a relationship one that Willona thinks is headed for the altar and she is unsure of how to tell him that she is not interested in marrying him without making him think that him being deaf is the reason.
48	11	"Florida's Protest"	Herbert Kenwith	Story by : Patricia Edwards; Teleplay by : Allan Manings	November 25, 1975	October 9, 1975
Florida and James become outraged when everyone except J.J. get a touch of food poisoning after eating meat from the local supermarket. She organizes a group of concerned citizens and they boycott the market. The protest brings effective results, but not before Florida experiences her first trip to jail.
49	12	"The Mural"	Herbert Kenwith	Story by : Thad Mumford and Dick Bensfield & Perry Grant; Teleplay by : Dick Bensfield & Perry Grant	December 2, 1975	October 30, 1975
Thelma comes home with news that she has won a college scholarship, but is short of funds by $200. Meanwhile, J.J. is commissioned by a bank to paint a mural and in return will receive $250 and agrees to give her the money she needs. However, the bank is reluctant to pay after seeing the finished product.
50	13	"A Loss of Confidence"	Herbert Kenwith	Norman Paul & Jack Elinson	December 9, 1975	November 6, 1975
Thelma brings home a friend who she is tutoring in French and instantly J.J. is smitten. J.J. goes all out trying to impress her. However, when she rejects him he quickly loses all of his confidence and slips into a depression.
51	14	"Cousin Cleatus" "Florida's Nephew Goes Bad..."	Herbert Kenwith	Story by : Ron Allen Thompson; Teleplay by : Ron Allen Thompson and Norman Paul & Jack Elinson	December 16, 1975	November 13, 1975
A bank robbery in Atlanta has the FBI showing up at the Evans' apartment to question Florida since her nephew, Cleatus is the suspect. Things get worse, when Cleatus arrives at the apartment with a briefcase full of money and wanting a place to stay. Meanwhile, a new stereo that Florida has won causes a power outage whenever the family uses it.
52	15	"The Family Tree"	Herbert Kenwith	Bob Peete	December 23, 1975	November 20, 1975
Thelma researches her family tree for a school project and discovers that James's father is alive and living in the Chicago area. However, when James learns that Thelma has invited him as a surprise for his birthday, he refuses to look at him. This leads Florida to discover why James lied about his father still being alive.
53	16	"A Place to Die"	Herbert Kenwith	Story by : Norman Paul & Jack Elinson; Teleplay by : Norman Paul & Jack Elinson and Roger Shulman & John Baskin	December 30, 1975	December 4, 1975
An elderly man who Michael befriended stops by the Evans' apartment just prior to the New Year's celebration and knowing that he only has a little time left, decides that this would be the best place to die, surrounded by a loving family and friends. Meanwhile, James is out of town while taking a temporary job and becomes snowbound, causing him to miss the New Year's festivities. Note: John Amos does not appear in this episode.
54	17	"J.J.'s Fiancée: Part 1" "I Pronounce You...: Part 1"	Herbert Kenwith	Roger Shulman & John Baskin	January 6, 1976	December 11, 1975
J.J. and his girlfriend, Diana (Debbie Allen), are getting serious and the topic of marriage comes up, something which J.J. and Diana both want. However, both of their parents are totally against the notion. Meanwhile, Diana has been acting strange, she steals money from her mother and a ring from a jewelry store, but it turns out that this is just a means to support a hidden drug problem.
55	18	"J.J.'s Fiancée: Part 2" "I Pronounce You...: Part 2"	Herbert Kenwith	Story by : Roger Shulman & John Baskin; Teleplay by : Roger Shulman & John Baskin and Norman Paul & Jack Elinson	January 13, 1976	December 18, 1975
After their parents sternly refuse the notion of J.J. and Diana marrying, Diana decides to run off to Indiana and elope with J.J. Meanwhile, back in Chicago, Thelma makes two shocking discoveries. First, while at the prom she realizes that J.J. and Diana never showed up and, second, she somehow switched purses with Diana and discovers that she has a drug problem and number for the supplier. Note: Ralph Carter does not appear in this episode. Guest star: Philip Baker Hall as the motel owner
56	19	"Sweet Daddy Williams"	Herbert Kenwith	James Ritz	January 20, 1976	January 8, 1976
J.J. has been commissioned by a numbers runner, Sweet Daddy Williams (Theodore Wilson), to paint the portrait of his girlfriend, Savannah. In return, J.J. will get his own "one man show". However, Sweet Daddy's influence soon becomes too much for Florida and James to take and try to encourage J.J. to turn Sweet Daddy's offers down. But things take a turn, when Savannah sees J.J.'s painting of her. Note: Ja'net DuBois does not appear in this episode.
57	20	"The Investigation"	Herbert Kenwith	Bruce Howard	January 27, 1976	January 15, 1976
The family is being investigated by the FBI because they are suspected to be security risks due to Michael doing research about and communicating with a Communist country for a term paper. However, the investigation leads to James losing his job and J.J. suspects this is also the reason why he got fired from his job at the Chicken Shack. Note: Ja'net DuBois does not appear in this episode.
58	21	"J.J. in Trouble"	Herbert Kenwith	Roger Shulman & John Baskin	February 3, 1976	January 22, 1976
When James and Florida go out of town for a family wedding, the children are left at home alone and J.J. soon begins acting like a dictator. And Thelma and Michael argue at J.J and Wilona stop them for argue. However, J.J. is in for a shock when he receives bad news that he has given VD to an ex-girlfriend. This leads an embarrassed J.J. to debate whether or not to visit a free clinic for treatment. Note: Esther Rolle and John Amos do not appear in the episode. Guest star: Jay Leno as a clinic patron Note: Due to the sensitive nature of this story, a parental warning was posted prior to the opening for the only time during the series run.
59	22	"Florida the Woman"	Herbert Kenwith	Jay Sommers	February 17, 1976	February 5, 1976
After a morning of being taken granted for by her children and her husband, Florida decides to take her boss (Thalmus Rasulala) up on a lunch invitation. This eventually leads to a confrontation with a jealous James.
60	23	"The Breakup"	Herbert Kenwith	Bob Peete	February 24, 1976	February 12, 1976
Thelma's fiance's idea of romance is taking her to a basketball game but that is the least of her worries after he gets a big break in California leaving her with two options, stay with her family in Chicago or move to California with her fiancé. Florida tries to calm a furious James and insists that it is time to let Thelma make her own decisions. Guest star: Debbi Morgan as Samantha
61	24	"The Rent Party"	Herbert Kenwith	Roger Shulman & John Baskin	March 2, 1976	February 19, 1976
While J.J. is in St. Louis at an art show, the Evans family decides to hold a rent party to help out Wanda (Helen Martin), a neighbor in the building, whose electricity has just been turned off. However, the party may come to a quick halt when the heartless building superintendent, Nathan Bookman, catches wind of it. Meanwhile, Michael, Thelma, Willona and Florida all prepare to provide entertainment during the party. Ralph Carter as Michael sings his actual single from 1975, "When You're Young and In Love" Note: This is the final appearance of John Amos as James Evans, Sr. He was fired from the show, due to the feud with writers and concerns with authenticity in the storylines, therefore, his character had died in an automobile accident, in the fourth season. This is also the final episode of the series to be directed by Herbert Kenwith, as Gerren Keith would take over directorial duties for the remainder of the series run. Jimmie Walker does not appear in this episode.

=== Season 4 (1976–1977) ===
No. overall	No. in season	Title	Directed by	Written by	Original release date	Tape date
62	1	"The Big Move: Part 1"	Gerren Keith	Austin Kalish & Irma Kalish	September 22, 1976	July 15, 1976
The Evans family is getting ready to move to Mississippi where James has a promising new job. However, the family is waiting for the right time to tell Bookman the news. Later, Willona throws a going-away party, but the happiness is interrupted when a devastating telegram comes: James has been killed in a car accident.
63	2	"The Big Move: Part 2"	Gerren Keith	Lou Derman & Bill Davenport	September 29, 1976	July 22, 1976
The sudden death of James has J.J., Thelma, and Michael overcome with grief, but also wondering why Florida has not grieved once since she heard news of James' death. Michael and Thelma become outraged during a get-together at the apartment after James' funeral, where Florida appears to be laughing and having a great time, acting as if it was an ordinary party, while J.J. is just concerned. After everyone leaves, Florida keeps assuring the kids that she is fine, as she cleans up. Finally, when she gets the punch bowl to put away, Florida snaps and smashes it to the floor shouting, "Damn, damn, DAMN!", overwhelmed with grief. The children rush in to comfort her, as the closing credits then appear, in silence rather than with the usual applause.
64	3	"J.J. and the Older Woman"	Gerren Keith	Story by : Bruce Howard; Teleplay by : Bruce Howard and Sid Dorfman	October 6, 1976	July 29, 1976
Thelma is trying to impress her new ballet teacher, Miss Jessica Bishop (Rosalind Cash), with guacamole. She seems to be more interested in J.J.'s paintings...and J.J. This relationship annoys Florida because she is 15 years older than him. Things really become serious when Jessica asks J.J. to move in with her.
65	4	"Michael the Warlord"	Gerren Keith	Bob Peete	October 13, 1976	August 5, 1976
Widespread violence has been running rampant in the neighborhood and a large part of it is due to the street gang, the Warlords. While Florida and some concerned citizens discuss the problem, Michael does his best to conceal from his mother that he is a member of the gang, having joined under the threat of bodily injury if he refused.
66	5	"Michael's Great Romance"	Gerren Keith	Kim Weiskopf & Michael Baser	October 20, 1976	September 9, 1976
Michael is in love with Yvonne but every time he is around her he freezes. When Yvonne meets J.J. she instantly falls for him thus creating a sibling rivalry between Michael and J.J. Meanwhile, Florida must cope with the two fighting siblings and tries to explain to Michael what he is doing wrong.
67	6	"Evans Versus Davis"	Gerren Keith	Story by : Coslough Johnson; Teleplay by : Coslough Johnson and Sid Dorfman	October 27, 1976	October 14, 1976
Alderman Davis makes a visit to the Evans' household wanting J.J. to speak at his re-election campaign. However, when J.J. refuses, an eviction notice is immediately handed to Florida. Soon, the Evans family is caught between a rock and a hard place when they must decide whether or not to stand up for their principles and be evicted or support a political shyster.
68	7	"J.J.'s New Career: Part 1"	Gerren Keith	Roger Shulman & John Baskin	November 10, 1976	August 19, 1976
After losing his job, J.J. tries his best to find another. However, when Bookman serves the Evans' family with an eviction notice due to late rent, J.J. decides to take a job offer from a couple of his shady friends. Meanwhile, Thelma contemplates dropping out of college to get a full-time job and help the family out.
69	8	"J.J.'s New Career: Part 2"	Gerren Keith	Roger Shulman & John Baskin	November 17, 1976	August 26, 1976
J.J. is in the money, now that he has a new job working with two friends in a gambling operation. However, little does he know, the gambling business also includes prostitution and drugs. Meanwhile, Florida demands some answers from J.J. and kicks him out when she learns what line of work he is now in and he almost winds up in jail.
70	9	"Grandpa's Visit"	Gerren Keith	Story by : Kurt Taylor & Booker Bradshaw; Teleplay by : Roger Shulman & John Baskin	November 24, 1976	November 4, 1976
The family is looking forward to Grandpa Evans visiting for Thanksgiving dinner, but he has a surprise for them: he has a woman! And to make matters worse, she is staying with Grandpa, although the two aren't married! When Florida discovers this, she hits the roof and it soon becomes a battle over morals and this leads Grandpa to decide that the best thing to do is leave.
71	10	"Rich Is Better Than Poor...Maybe?"	Gerren Keith	Allan Manings & Norman Paul	December 8, 1976	September 2, 1976
Florida, Willona, J.J., Thelma and Michael are all excited, having each purchased lottery tickets for the state lottery. Good luck strikes the family when J.J. wins the lottery, a total of $2500. However, the luck does not last long, as Thelma's friend Edna shows up with her sister, Rozzie, both wielding pistols and demanding the winning money. Guest Star: Shirley Hemphill as Rozzie.
72	11	"Florida's Night Out"	Gerren Keith	Norman Belkin & Harriet Belkin	December 15, 1976	September 23, 1976
The kids feel Florida has been spending too much time alone and they decide to cancel their plans and spend an evening with her. But Florida surprises them all and goes out with Willona. Willona takes her to a local night spot where they have an exciting evening.
73	12	"The Judy Cohen Story"	Gerren Keith	Nance McCormick & John Donley	December 22, 1976	October 14, 1976
J.J. is managing Michael's singing group and gets them a gig at a local tavern. When Florida learns that Michael may be performing in a tavern, she hits the roof and storms down there to put a stop to it, thus breaking up the act. While there, J.J. comes across Judith Cohen, an act whom he knows will hit it big, given the right exposure. Note: Judith Cohen was the only celebrity ever to appear on Good Times as herself.
74	13	"The Comedian and the Loan Sharks"	Gerren Keith	Hugh Wedlock, Jr. & Jack Matcha	January 5, 1977	November 18, 1976
J.J. borrows money from a loan shark to back his talented new comedian, Tyrone. However, within days, two thugs come to collect their money, money that J.J. does not have. Time is running out as the pressure comes down on Tyrone, J.J. will get his money if Tyrone is good. However, at the last minute, Tyrone bails, leaving J.J. to do the show.
75	14	"The Hustle"	Gerren Keith	Levi Taylor	January 12, 1977	December 23, 1976
Florida is in a terrible mood, and takes it out on the kids, yelling at them to get the chores done. A cheerful Willona stops in and makes the announcement that she is off for a relaxing weekend in Lake Geneva. After hearing this, the kids go into the underwear selling business in order to raise enough money to send Florida on a much-needed vacation to Lake Geneva.
76	15	"Thelma's African Romance"	Gerren Keith	Bob Peete	January 19, 1977	December 9, 1976 December 16, 1976
77	16	"Thelma's African Romance"	Gerren Keith	Bob Peete	January 19, 1977	December 9, 1976 December 16, 1976
Thelma and her college friends are having a meeting to decide what to do about the school cafeteria, but things come to a head when the African exchange student, Ibe, starts making sexist remarks about "woman's work". They finally agree to have a picket, but on the day of the picket, the assistant dean ends up then suspending Thelma. Meanwhile, Thelma and Ibe begin seeing each other, resulting in Ibe asking her to move in with him. Florida hits the roof when Thelma announces her plans of moving in with Ibe. However, things begin moving a little bit too fast when Ibe asks her to marry him and move to Nigeria. At first Thelma is all for it, despite Florida insisting that she take time and go slow, but when Thelma discovers she may become part of a harem, she has second thoughts. Guest star: Johnny Sekka as Ibe
78	17	"Willona's Surprise"	Gerren Keith	Austin Kalish & Irma Kalish	January 26, 1977	December 2, 1976
Willona gets a surprise for her birthday, a visit from her womanizing former husband, Ray. Ray does his best at convincing Willona that he has changed and she decides to try to start over with him. However, quickly his old ways surface and he begins making passes at Thelma.
79	18	"A Friend in Need"	Gerren Keith	Roger Shulman & John Baskin	February 2, 1977	January 13, 1977
When Florida's away for the weekend, J.J., Thelma and Michael throw a wild party and try to keep it from Willona, who is keeping an eye on them while their mother is away. However, the party gets even wilder than they had dreamed of when one of the guests takes an overdose of sleeping pills and J.J. has to keep him from falling asleep to save his life. Note: Esther Rolle does not appear in this episode.
80	19	"A Stormy Relationship"	Gerren Keith	Bruce Kalish & Ron Sellz	February 9, 1977	January 20, 1977
Michael has gotten a part-time job working for Carl Dixon at his repair shop. However, Florida is horrified to learn that Michael is harboring atheist attitudes planted by his boss. This leads Florida to confront Michael's boss and get to the bottom of the situation.
81	20	"Florida and Carl"	Gerren Keith	John Baskin & Roger Shulman	February 23, 1977	January 27, 1977
J.J., Thelma, Michael and Willona are all excited with the prospects of Florida beginning to date. However, Florida is reluctant to dive into the dating pool but agrees to go on a date with Carl Dixon. Once at the restaurant, she gets into an argument with him when they receive terrible service leading to him walking out.
82	21	"My Son, the Father"	Gerren Keith	Sid Dorfman	March 2, 1977	February 10, 1977
A father son dinner is being planned at Michael's school and J.J. is all excited about taking Michael to the dinner but when Michael breaks the news that he invited Carl to take him, J.J. storms out. Feeling as if the family no longer needs him, J.J. begins considering moving out on his own.
83	22	"J.J. in Business"	Gerren Keith	Bob Peete	March 9, 1977	March 03, 1977
J.J., with the help of Carl, opens a greeting card business and has the entire family help with creating thoughtful greeting card sayings. However, when an accountant comes into look over the books, J.J. is in for a rude awakening, for he only has $68 in the bank. He finds this out just as he gets a huge order, which will cost him $2000. J.J. soon discovers that getting a loan is not going to be an easy task. Guest star: Alice Ghostley as Ms. Austin
84	23	"Love Has a Spot on Its Lung: Part 1"	Gerren Keith	Austin Klash & Irma Kalish and Allan Manings	March 23, 1977	February 17, 1977
Florida and Carl's relationship has gotten quite serious and Carl breaks the news to J.J., Thelma and Michael that he is planning on proposing marriage to Florida. However, after a visit to his doctor, Carl decides to break off the relationship, since he has been diagnosed with lung cancer.
85	24	"Love Has a Spot on Its Lung: Part 2"	Gerren Keith	Roger Shulman & John Baskin	March 30, 1977	February 24, 1977
After Carl calls off his relationship with Florida, a furious J.J. confronts Carl, who makes up an excuse that a war injury in the groin is the reason why he is breaking up with Florida. Later, a drunken J.J. stays out all night with a drunken Carl, worrying Florida to death. Later, Carl reveals the truth to Florida, and he proposes marriage, and she readily accepts. Meanwhile, Bookman tries his best to get the Evans apartment re-painted, with the not-so helpful assistance of two lazy painters. Note: Final appearance of Moses Gunn. In the following season, Florida and Carl were written out to have married and they went to Arizona due to Carl’s health. Esther Rolle left the show, but returns in season 6.

=== Season 5 (1977–1978) ===
No. overall	No. in season	Title	Directed by	Written by	Original release date	Tape date
86	1	"The Evans Get Involved: Part 1" "The Evans Get Involved: Part 2""	Gerren Keith	Austin Kalish & Irma Kalish	September 21, 1977	August 11, 1977
87	2	"The Evans Get Involved: Part 1" "The Evans Get Involved: Part 2""	Gerren Keith	Sid Dorfman	September 21, 1977	August 11, 1977
When young Penny Gordon follows J.J. home, she tells the Evanses tall tales about her life without mentioning her abusive mother (Chip Fields). But when Penny changes into a dress, a stunned Willona and Thelma discover the girl's badly bruised back. Willona and the Evans children are convinced that Penny is being abused and discover that she has an injured arm, caused by her abusive mother, but the doctor who treats Penny refuses to believe that she is a victim of child abuse. Note: This is the first appearance of Penny, played by Janet Jackson. Esther Rolle is absent during the entire season. The character of Mrs. Carpenter is played by Kathleen Doyle, portrayed as a social worker from the Illinois Department of Children and Families in Parts 2 and 3.
88	3	"The Evans Get Involved: Part 3"	Gerren Keith	Lloyd Turner & Gordon Mitchell	September 28, 1977	August 18, 1977
Willona and the Evanses are stunned to discover that Penny and her mother have moved, but soon find the girl hiding in the Evans apartment. Later, Penny's abusive mother abandons her, leaving Willona to ponder adopting the battered youth.
89	4	"The Evans Get Involved: Part 4"	Gerren Keith	Austin Kalish & Irma Kalish	October 5, 1977	August 25, 1977
While Willona worries about the adoption, Bookman tries to help by telling the social worker (Alice Ghostley) that he is Willona's husband.
90	5	"Thelma Moves Out"	Gerren Keith	Michael S. Baser & Kim Weiskopf	October 12, 1977	September 8, 1977
Fed up with her brothers and her lack of privacy, Thelma moves in with three roommates.
91	6	"Willona, the Fuzz"	Gerren Keith	Story by : Richard Freiman; Teleplay by : Richard Freiman and Sid Dorfman	October 19, 1977	September 15, 1977
Willona's new job in department-store security requires that she spy on changing rooms through a one-way mirror. Guest stars: Conchata Ferrell and Gordon Jump
92	7	"Wheels" "J.J. and the Car"	Gerren Keith	Story by : Bill Freedman & Al Schwartz; Teleplay by : Bill Freedman & Al Schwartz and Michael S. Baser & Kim Weiskopf	November 2, 1977	September 29, 1977
J.J. and his friends buy Bookman's beat-up old car and argue over who gets to drive it.
93	8	"Breaker, Breaker"	Gerren Keith	Elroy Schwartz	November 9, 1977	July 28, 1977
While using a CB radio, Michael makes a connection with a teenage paraplegic girl.
94	9	"Bye-Bye Bookman"	Gerren Keith	Robert Wolterstorff & Paul Belous	November 16, 1977	October 6, 1977
Fed up with Bookman's incompetence, Willona, Penny and the Evans kids start a petition that gets him fired.
95	10	"Thelma's Brief Encounter"	Gerren Keith	Bruce Kalish & Phillip Wickham Taylor	December 7, 1977	October 13, 1977
J.J., Willona and Michael suspect that Thelma's new boyfriend is married, but find that he is a former bigamist doing time in a halfway house. Note: Johnny Brown does not appear in this episode.
96	11	"Requiem for a Wino"	Gerren Keith	Lloyd Turner & Gordon Mitchell	December 14, 1977	October 20, 1977
When local wino Fishbone (Robert Guillaume) is mistakenly believed to have been killed, he attends his own wake dressed in drag as a mourner. Guest star: Helen Martin as Weeping Wanda
97	12	"Penny's Christmas"	Gerren Keith	Robert Stevenson & Rosalind Stevenson	December 21, 1977	December 1, 1977
When Penny steals a necklace from a department store, Willona faces the possibility of losing custody of the girl. Guest star: Alice Ghostley
98	13	"No More Mr. Nice Guy"	Gerren Keith	Tom Dunsmuir & Dan Wilcox	January 4, 1978	November 17, 1977
J.J. assumes the role of father figure when Michael starts to slack off, prohibiting his brother from attending an awards dinner. Note: Johnny Brown does not appear in this episode.
99	14	"Willona's Mr. Right"	Gerren Keith	Laura Levine	January 11, 1978	November 10, 1977
When Willona rejects an old boyfriend's proposal, Penny thinks she's holding Willona back and tries to run away.
100	15	"J.J. and the Boss' Daughter"	Gerren Keith	Story by : Kevin Hopps & Bob Baublitz; Teleplay by : Kevin Hopps & Bob Baublitz and Michael S. Baser & Kim Weiskopf	January 18, 1978	December 8, 1977
J.J. dates his sexy new assistant, who is also the boss's daughter. Note: Johnny Brown does not appear in this episode.
101	16	"Where There's Smoke"	Gerren Keith	Bruce Kalish & Phillip Wickham Taylor	January 25, 1978	December 15, 1977
With a hole burned into a couch cushion, the Evans kids each flashback to their versions of how it happened. Note: Johnny Brown does not appear in this episode.
102	17	"I Had a Dream"	Gerren Keith	Jim Rogers	January 30, 1978	November 3, 1977
Afraid he will be passed over for a promotion in favor of a white man, J.J. has a crazy dream in which he experiences being white. Guest star: Sorrell Booke
103	18	"The Boarder"	Gerren Keith	Don Segall	February 6, 1978	December 22, 1977
The Evans fear that their new boarder may become the target of a hitman.
104	19	"J.J.'s Condition"	Gerren Keith	Dusty Kay & Bill Nuss	February 13, 1978	January 19, 1978
J.J.'s relationship with a married woman gives him an ulcer.
105	20	"Willona, The Other Woman"	Gerren Keith	Michael G. Moye	February 27, 1978	January 26, 1978
Already suspected of infidelity by his wife, Bookman is caught with Willona in a compromising situation.
106	21	"Something Old, Something New"	Gerren Keith	Sid Dorfman	March 13, 1978	January 12, 1978
James' father visits and proposes marriage to his neglected girlfriend.
107	22	"Willona's New Job"	Gerren Keith	Michael G. Moye	March 20, 1978	February 16, 1978
Willona reconsiders her marriage plans when she hears her boyfriend's old-fashioned views on marriage and women in the workplace. Note: Jimmie Walker does not appear in this episode.
108	23	"Write on Thelma"	Gerren Keith	Judi Ann Mason	March 27, 1978	February 9, 1978
Thelma's play is selected as a local theater's latest production, but not without a flurry of changes demanded by the theater's owner (Jane Connell).
109	24	"That's Entertainment, Evans Style"	Gerren Keith	Kim Weiskopf & Michael S. Baser	April 3, 1978	February 23, 1978
With J.J. out of town, the Evanses put on a talent show to save a local daycare center. Note: Jimmie Walker does not appear in this episode. Guest star: Gary Coleman

=== Season 6 (1978–1979) ===
No. overall	No. in season	Title	Directed by	Written by	Original release date	Tape date
110	1	"Florida's Homecoming: Part 1"	Gerren Keith	Story by : Michael S. Baser & Kim Weiskopf and Norman Paul; Teleplay by : Michael S. Baser & Kim Weiskopf	September 16, 1978	July 27, 1978
111	2	"Florida's Homecoming: Part 2"	Gerren Keith	Story by : Joe Bonaduce and Norman Paul; Teleplay by : Sid Dorfman and Joe Bonaduce	September 16, 1978	July 27, 1978
Thelma accepts a marriage proposal from college football star Keith Anderson (Ben Powers), who is negotiating a lucrative NFL contract. Florida arrives home after hearing of Thelma's engagement. Florida arrives without Carl (It has been speculated that Carl died of cancer, however it was never mentioned in the series). J.J. loses his job. Note: Esther Rolle returns in this episode.
112	3	"Florida's Homecoming: Part 3"	Gerren Keith	Story by : Norman Paul; Teleplay by : Wayne Kline & Sid Dorfman	September 23, 1978	August 3, 1978
To pay for the wedding, J.J. takes a loan from Sweet Daddy Williams. But while walking down the aisle, Keith injures his knee.
113	4	"Florida's Homecoming: Part 4"	Gerren Keith	Story by : Norman Paul and Bruce Howard & Joe Bonaduce; Teleplay by : Bruce Howard & Joe Bonaduce	September 30, 1978	August 10, 1978
The day after the wedding tragedy, Keith blames J.J. for injuring his knee. Florida rallies the family together while Sweet Daddy Williams comes calling for his payment. Guest star: Bubba Smith as Claude
114	5	"Florida Gets a Job"	Gerren Keith	Michael G. Moye	October 7, 1978	August 31, 1978
Florida competes with a relative of Alderman Davis for a job as a school-bus driver. Guest star: Gary Coleman
115	6	"Stomach Mumps"	Gerren Keith	Michael G. Moye	October 14, 1978	August 24, 1978
When Penny's 13-year-old friend becomes pregnant, Willona tells Penny that the friend has "stomach mumps".
116	7	"J.J. The Teacher"	Gerren Keith	Mark Fink	October 21, 1978	September 14, 1978
J.J.'s art student has a violent father (Hal Williams) who refuses to allow his son to take the lessons. So he hides out at the Evans apartment.
117	8	"Michael's Decision"	Gerren Keith	Story by : Norman Paul; Teleplay by : Gene Farmer	November 8, 1978	September 21, 1978
Michael plans to move in with a white female roommate whose parents' attitudes make him reconsider.
118	9	"J.J. and the Plumber's Helper"	Gerren Keith	Michael G. Moye	December 2, 1978	October 12, 1978
Vanessa Blake (Sheryl Lee Ralph) is back in town. She and J.J. used to be an item, and he can't seem to break the news to Vanessa that he lost his job. Meanwhile, Bookman has a new assistant named Teresa a/k/a T.C. (Bever-Leigh Banfield), who he constantly mistreats. She falls for J.J., but he only has Vanessa on his mind. Note: Ralph Carter and Janet Jackson do not appear in this episode.
119	10	"The Witness"	Gerren Keith	Story by : Bruce Howard; Teleplay by : Bruce Howard and Joe Bonaduce	December 9, 1978	September 28, 1978
J.J. is the only witness to a car accident involving a taxicab and Savannah Morgan, Sweet Daddy Williams's girlfriend. Sweet Daddy shows up and pressures J.J. into saying that the accident was the taxi cab's fault. Things take a very serious turn, when he finds out that Keith was the driver of the taxicab, and Savannah hit the cab. Note: Esther Rolle does not appear in this episode.
120	11	"The Snow Storm"	Gerren Keith	Bud Slocomb & Len Riley	December 13, 1978	November 16, 1978
A snowstorm hits Chicago, and Florida gets stuck in it with her school bus. This leads her and the kids on the bus to take refuge in an abandoned building to keep warm. Note: Jimmie Walker does not appear in this episode. Guest star: Kim Fields
121	12	"The Traveling Christmas"	Gerren Keith	Story by : Sid Dorfman; Teleplay by : Norman Paul and Wayne Kline	December 20, 1978	November 30, 1978
When Keith's Scrooge-like boss at the taxi-cab company will not give him Christmas off, the Evans family brings their Christmas party to Keith and holds at the company. J.J. hosts the festivities and it features Michael singing, Bookman (dressed as Santa) dancing, Keith doing impersonations & the girls (Florida, Penny, Willona & Thelma) portraying "The Pointless Sisters" doing "Steam Heat".
122	13	"House Hunting"	Gerren Keith	Gene Farmer	January 3, 1979	October 19, 1978
The Evans family has found the perfect home to move into and plan on taking out a loan to pay for it. However, they quickly find, as usual, that that's easier said than done, when they run into trouble trying to persuade the banker. Charles Siebert guest stars as the banker.
123	14	"Florida's Favorite Passenger: Part 1"	Gerren Keith	Michael G. Moye	May 23, 1979	October 26, 1978
A student whom Florida drives to school on her bus becomes the center of attention when Florida discovers he has a hearing problem and his mother refuses to believe Florida's suspicions.
124	15	"Florida's Favorite Passenger: Part 2"	Gerren Keith	Michael G. Moye	May 30, 1979	November 9, 1978
After a near fatal accident, Larry's mother finally realizes that Larry has a hearing problem. Unable to take him to the doctor because she has to work, Mrs. Baker allows Florida to take him to the doctor, which is where Larry makes the announcement that he plans on running away from home. Note: Jimmie Walker does not appear in this episode.
125	16	"Blood Will Tell"	Gerren Keith	Anthony Bonaduce & Celia Bonaduce	June 6, 1979	January 18, 1979
Sweet Daddy Williams sends his hoods to snatch J.J. from his home and bring him to the hospital. His reasons: J.J. is the only person they could find that matches Sweet Daddy's blood type and Sweet Daddy is in dire need of a blood transfusion. Note: Esther Rolle does not appear in this episode.
126	17	"Where Have All the Doctors Gone?"	Gerren Keith	Story by : Carmen Finestra; Teleplay by : Mark Fink and J. A. Mason	June 13, 1979	February 15, 1979
When Willona goes out of town, she leaves Penny in Florida's care. Shortly after, Penny comes down with a virus and Florida takes her down to the free clinic to be examined. Florida quickly comes face to face with the hard-nosed doctor (Paula Kelly) who is out of touch with the people in the ghetto and also planning to leave, right in the middle of what seems to be an epidemic.
127	18	"J.J. and T.C."	Gerren Keith	Wayne Kline & Mark Fink	June 20, 1979	March 8, 1979
A tomboy who has been helping out Bookman, wants J.J. to ask her to a dance. However, J.J. thinks of her as just one of the guys, that is until he has an encounter with her at a seedy pick-up bar. Guest star: Paul Mooney
128	19	"The Physical"	Gerren Keith	Bud Slocomb & Len Riley	July 11, 1979	January 25, 1979
Florida discovers she must take and pass a physical examination to keep her bus driving job. However, the night before her physical is utter chaos ending with Michael landing in jail. Note: Jimmie Walker does not appear in this episode.
129	20	"A Matter of Mothers"	Gerren Keith	Story by : Jacqueline Henken; Teleplay by : Michael G. Moye	July 18, 1979	February 1, 1979
Willona's latest boyfriend, Jeffrey, has been showering her and Penny with extravagant gifts even though they've only been seeing one another for a couple months. Little does Willona know, that he is part of a plan to make Willona look like an unfit mother, a plan engineered by Penny's scheming birth mother. Mrs. Gordon, who had married into a wealthy family, supposedly busts Willona in giving a disorderly party in front of a minor, but she herself gets busted when Penny accidentally records Mrs. Gordon's voice admitting that it was all a set up to take Penny back. However, a tearful Penny outright rejects her birth mother and remains with her real mother, Willona. Guest stars: Rod Perry as Jeff; John Witherspoon as the second police detective Note: Jimmie Walker, Bern Nadette Stanis and Ben Powers do not appear in this episode.
130	21	"The End of the Rainbow"	Gerren Keith	Wayne Kline & Mark Fink	August 1, 1979	March 1, 1979
This final episode brings all too good news for the Evans family. J.J. gets an offer from a comic company, Keith's bad knee is miraculously healed, and he is offered another football contract. Florida is asked if she wants to move in with Keith and Thelma in the fancy apartment building across town where Willona happens to be moving, and she just so happens to be her future next-door neighbor. Meanwhile Thelma learns she is pregnant, and she reveals it to Keith and the family.
131	22	"The Evans' Dilemma" "Keith’s Problem"	Gerren Keith	Story by : Cecil M. Brown; Teleplay by : Cecil M. Brown and Michael G. Moye	September 18, 1979	December 14, 1978
Keith's search for a job results in strange behavior that everyone plainly points out is not just frustration, but rather a bigger problem. Little does anyone know, Keith has developed a serious drinking problem. Note: This episode appeared only in syndication after the show's original run ended. In the case of this and the following two episodes, the actual "original" broadcast date may vary in every market, due to the technique of shipping tapes of the program between stations at the time (known as "bicycling").
132	23	"The Art Contest"	Gerren Keith	Joe Bonaduce	December 13, 1979	December 21, 1978
J.J. is teaching art classes and one of his students, Emily, has great promise and skill with her paintings. It seems that J.J.'s painting is selected for a contest, and J.J. makes the mistake of asking Bookman to take it downtown for him but he takes Emily's painting to the contest by mistake! J.J. wins first prize for the painting and soon must decide whether or not to take credit for something he did not do. Note: This episode appeared only in syndication after the show's original run ended. Ralph Carter does not appear in this episode.
133	24	"Cousin Raymond"	Gerren Keith	Walter Smith & Bill Duke	January 30, 1980	February 22, 1979
Florida has a surprise visit from her cousin, Raymond (Calvin Lockhart), who has hit it big and gives each member of the family an expensive gift. However, Florida is reluctant to accept her gift of an expensive three-room apartment, when she learns just how Raymond makes his money. Note: This episode appeared only in syndication after the show's original run ended.
