= Irma Kalish =

American producer and screenwriter (1924–2021)

- Born: Irma May Ginsberg; October 6, 1924; The Bronx, New York, U.S.
- Died: September 3, 2021 (aged 96); Woodland Hills, California U.S.
- Occupations: Producer, screenwriter
- Spouse: Austin Kalish (m. 1948; died. 2016)
- Children: 2; including Bruce Kalish

Irma May Kalish (née Ginsberg; October 6, 1924 – September 3, 2021) was an American television producer and screenwriter who held a pioneering role as a woman in the TV industry. Kalish produced and wrote for television programs, including Too Close for Comfort, All in the Family, The Facts of Life, Good Times, The Hogan Family, Maude, I Dream of Jeannie, F Troop and Family Affair. She is known for writing the episode of Maude where Maude gets an abortion.

== Early life and education ==
Kalish was born in The Bronx in New York City.

In 1944 or 1945, Kalish graduated from Syracuse University, where she was a member of Phi Sigma Sigma sorority.

== Career ==
Kalish produced and wrote for television programs, including Too Close for Comfort, All in the Family, The Facts of Life, Good Times, The Hogan Family, Maude, I Dream of Jeannie, F Troop and Family Affair.

Starting with the radio show, The Martin and Lewis Show, that featured Dean Martin and Jerry Lewis, Kalish often wrote with her husband Rocky, her writing partner. When the radio show became a TV show, the Kalishes made the shift to writing for television.

Kalish also executive produced 227, a sitcom about a working-class African-American family in Washington, D.C.

Kalish also wrote under the pseudonym Cady Kalian with co-writer Naomi Gurian.

== Personal life ==
Kalish was married to Austin “Rocky” Kalish from 1948 to his death in 2016. The couple met when they were young kids in the Bronx. Kalish was Rocky's sister's friend. They had a son, comedy writer Bruce Kalish, and a daughter, Nancy Biederman, who pre-deceased Kalish.

Kalish died on September 3, 2021, at the Motion Picture & Television Fund cottages in Woodland Hills, California, at the age of 96 from complications of pneumonia.

== Membership ==
- Association for Women in Communications, Executive member
- Motion Picture and Television Fund, Board member
- Women in Film, President
- WIF Foundation, Chair
- Weizmann Institute of Science (Rehovot, Israel), Women & Science, founding member
- 1964-2021 : Writers Guild of America West, Vice President and Board member

== Honors ==
- 1978: Association for Women in Communications, National Headliner Awards
- 1993: Writers Guild of America, Morgan Cox Award
- 1997: Syracuse University, George Arents Pioneer Medal
- 1997: WIF Foundation, Founders Award
- 2005: Writers Guild of America, Valentine Davies Award
- 2014: Syracuse University, Eggers Senior Alumni Award
- Association for Women in Communications, Far West Woman of Achievement Award

== Selected filmography ==
- The Martin and Lewis Show (Radio show), writer
- The Martin and Lewis Show (TV series), writer
- 1955: The Millionaire (TV series), story (episode: "The Philip Sargent Story")
- 1964: The Patty Duke Show (TV series), written by (episode: "This Little Patty Went to Market")
- 1965: I Dream of Jeannie (TV series), written by (episode: "Whatever Became of Baby Custer?")
- 1965-1966: Gidget (TV series), written by/teleplay (3 episodes)
- 1965-1971: My Three Sons (TV series), written by (8 episodes)
- 1966: My Favorite Martian (TV series), written by (2 episodes)
- 1966: Please Don't Eat the Daisies (TV series), written by (2 episodes)
- 1966: The Hero (TV series), written by (episode: "The Day They Shot Sam Garrett")
- 1967: That Girl (TV series), written by (episode: "The Honeymoon Apartment")
- 1966-1967: F Troop (TV series), writer (8 episodes)
- 1966-1971: Family Affair (TV series), 1966-1971 written by (22 episodes); 1969-1971 story consultant (41 episodes)
- 1967: He & She (TV series), written by (episode: "One of Our Firemen Is Missing")
- 1967-1968: The Flying Nun (TV series, written by (2 episodes)
- 1968: Cimarron Strip (TV series), written by (episode: "Heller")
- 1970-1971: Nanny and the Professor (TV series), written by (2 episodes)
- 1971-1973: All in the Family (TV series), story by (2 episodes); teleplay by (2 episodes), written by (2 episodes)
- 1972: Maude (TV series), written by (2 episodes)
- 1972: Anna and the King (TV series), written by (episode: "The King and the Egg")
- 1973: The Bob Newhart Show (TV series), written by (episode: "Bum Voyage")
- 1973-1974: Dusty's Trail (TV series), written by (2 episodes)
- 1973-1974: The Brian Keith Show (TV series), written by (2 episodes)
- 1974: Apple's Way (TV series), writer
- 1975: Love Nest (TV movie), writer
- 1975: The Supercops (TV movie), writer
- 1975: Keep Off My Grass! (TV movie), producer; writer
- 1976: Good Heavens (TV series), producer (episode: "Coffee, Tea, or Gloria"); written by (4 episodes)
- 1976-1978: Good Times (TV series), 1976-1977 producer (24 episodes); 1976-1978 script supervisor (48 episodes); 1976-1977 written by (5 episodes); 1977-1978 executive producer (24 episodes)
- 1977: Mason (TV movie), creator; written by
- 1978-1979: Carter Country (TV series), executive producer (episode: "Hurricane Jasper"); written by (2 episodes)
- 1979: Rendezvous Hotel (TV movie), executive producer; writer
- 1979: America 2100 (TV movie), executive producer; writer
- 1979: Out of the Blue (TV series), executive producer (episode: "Random's Arrival")
- 1980: Ghost of a Chance (TV movie), executive producer; writer
- 1980-1982: Too Close for Comfort (TV series), 1980-1982 producer (40 episodes); 1981-1982 written by (6 episodes); 1981 teleplay (1 episode); 1982 story (1 episode)
- 1982: Kangaroos in the Kitchen (TV movie), producer, writer
- 1983: Foot in the Door (TV series), producer (episode: "Pilot"); written by (episode: "The Big Breakthrough")
- 1983: Oh Madeline (TV series), producer (18 episodes); story (1 episode); written by (1 episode)
- 1985: Finder of Lost Loves (TV series), writer (episode: "From the Heart")
- 1985: I Dream of Jeannie... Fifteen Years Later (TV movie), story/teleplay
- 1986-1988: The Facts of Life (TV series), 1986-1988 executive producer (46 episodes); 1986-1988 written by (5 episodes)
- 1987: Good Morning, Miss Bliss (TV series), executive consultant (episode: "Pilot")
- 1988-1990: 227 (TV series), 1988-1990 executive producer (39 episodes); 1989 written by (episode: "Tenants, Anyone?")
- 1990: Sugar and Spice (TV series), executive producer (episode: "Breaking in Is Hard to Do"); creator; writer (episode: "Pilot")
- 1990-1991: Valerie (TV series), executive producer (13 episodes)
- 1998: The Famous Jett Jackson (TV series), co-writer (episode: "Age Old Story")
- 2014: The Lottery (Short), writer

== About ==
- "The Good Life," Writer's Digest, November 1950. Cover-featured article on Irma and Rocky Kalish. The front cover text reads, "Two free lance writers edit Romance Western Roundup on the beach."
- Karen Young, "Hollywood vets Irma Kalish and Naomi Gurian on getting their groove back, in novel form," Encino Sun, October 28-November 3, 2006.
