= Good Heavens =

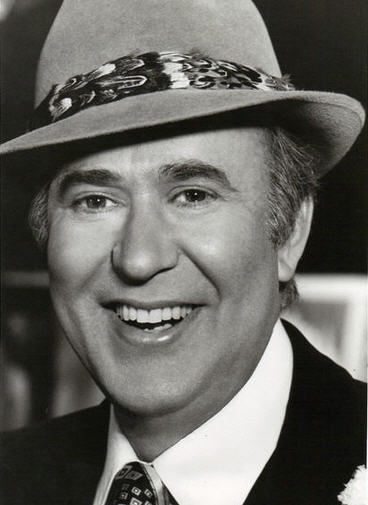
- Reiner in a promotional photo for Good Heavens
- Genre: Comedy anthology series
- Created by: Bernard Slade; Carl Reiner
- Written by: Austin Kalish; Irma Kalish; Sy Gomberg
- Starring: Carl Reiner
- Theme music composer: Patrick Williams
- Country of origin: United States
- Original language: English
- No. of seasons: 1
- No. of episodes: 13

Production
- Executive producer: Carl Reiner
- Producers: Austin Kalish; Irma Kalish; Mel Swope
- Running time: 30 minutes
- Production company: Columbia Pictures Television

Original release
- Network: ABC
- Release: February 29 – June 26, 1976

Good Heavens is an ABC comedy anthology series produced by Columbia Pictures Television that aired between February 29 and June 26, 1976. It ranked #17 in the Nielsen ratings during the 1975–76 television season. Despite relatively strong initial ratings as a midseason replacement, it was canceled and the remaining episodes of its thirteen episode order were burned off in May and June 1976.

The main character was Mr. Angel (Carl Reiner), an emissary of heaven who came down to Earth to grant wishes to those who had performed a good deed. The role was originally played by Jose Ferrer in the pilot, which was then titled Everything Money Can't Buy. Subsequent episodes featured actors such as Don Ameche, Susan Dey, Sandy Duncan, Pat Harrington Jr., Florence Henderson, Alex Karras, Penny Marshall, Hugh O'Brian, Loretta Swit, Brenda Vaccaro, and Fred Willard.

== Episodes ==
No.	Title	Directed by	Written by	Original release date
1	"Mr. Right"	Carl Reiner	Bernard Slade	February 29, 1976
2	"Take Me Out to the Ball Game"	John Erman	Austin & Irma Kalish	March 8, 1976
3	"Good Neighbor Maxine"	Carl Reiner	Sy Gomberg	March 15, 1976
4	"I Want Nancy!"	Carl Reiner	Jay Folb	March 22, 1976
5	"See Jane Run"	Carl Reiner	Robert Fisher & Arthur Marx	March 29, 1976
6	"Jack the Ribber and Me"	Carl Reiner	Austin & Irma Kalish	April 5, 1976
7	"A Night with Brockton"	Peter Bonerz	George Tibbles	May 22, 1976
8	"Superscoop"	James Sheldon	John D. Hess	May 29, 1976
9	"The Big Break"	Jerry Paris	William Raynor & Myles Wilder	June 5, 1976
10	"Mixed Doubles"	Carl Reiner	Austin & Irma Kalish	June 12, 1976
11	"The Queen's Rook Club"	Carl Reiner	Sy Gomberg	June 19, 1976
12	"Coffee, Tea, or Gloria"	Mel Swoope	Austin & Irma Kalish	June 26, 1976
13	"Funny Fellow"	Bud Molin	Seaman Jacobs & Fred Fox	June 26, 1976
