= Finder of Lost Loves =

American drama series

- Genre: Drama
- Created by: Gail Parent; Jill Baer; Christopher Vane
- Directed by: Bruce Bilson; Cliff Bole; Don Chaffey; Alf Kjellin; Philip Leacock; Kim Manners; Sigmund Neufeld, Jr. Barbara Peters; Allen Reisner; Bob Sweeney
- Starring: Anthony Franciosa; Deborah Adair; Anne Jeffreys; Richard Kantor; Larry "Flash" Jenkins
- Theme music composer: Burt Bacharach; Carole Bayer Sager
- Opening theme: "Finder of Lost Loves" by Dionne Warwick & Luther Vandross
- Composer: Artie Kane
- Country of origin: United States
- Original language: English
- No. of seasons: 1
- No. of episodes: 23

Production
- Executive producers: Douglas S. Cramer; E. Duke Vincent; Aaron Spelling
- Producers: Liz Coe; E. Duke Vincent; Jeffrey Hayes; Elaine Rich
- Cinematography: Edward R. Plante
- Running time: 60 mins.
- Production company: Aaron Spelling Productions

Original release
- Network: ABC
- Release: September 22, 1984 – April 13, 1985

Finder of Lost Loves is an American drama television series aired by the ABC network during the 1984–1985 season.

== Synopsis ==
After Cary Maxwell's (Anthony Franciosa) wife Kate dies, he decides to set up a private detective agency specializing in reuniting clients with a former loved one. The leading cast members were Franciosa, Deborah Adair, Anne Jeffreys, Richard Kantor, and Larry "Flash" Jenkins. Similar to The Love Boat (another Aaron Spelling production), the series featured various weekly guest stars. The series was canceled after 23 episodes.

== Cast ==
- Anthony Franciosa as Cary Maxwell
- Deborah Adair as Daisy Lloyd
- Anne Jeffreys as Rita Hargrove
- Larry "Flash" Jenkins as Lyman Whittaker
- Richard Kantor as Brian Fletcher

=== Guest stars ===
- Melissa Sue Anderson
- Mackenzie Astin
- Lew Ayres
- Patricia Barry
- Christine Belford
- Pamela Bellwood
- Susan Blakely
- Tom Bosley
- Macdonald Carey
- Jack Coleman
- Cathy Lee Crosby
- Mary Crosby
- Colleen Dewhurst
- Joyce DeWitt
- Buddy Ebsen
- Samantha Eggar
- Mel Ferrer
- Anne Francis
- Beverly Garland
- Harold Gould
- Robert Goulet
- Michael Gross
- Florence Henderson
- Bo Hopkins
- John James
- Lance Kerwin
- Kim Lankford
- Hope Lange
- Kay Lenz
- Gary Lockwood
- Carol Lynley
- Kevin McCarthy
- Leigh McCloskey
- Lee Meriwether
- Vera Miles
- Michael Nader
- Leslie Nielsen
- Lois Nettleton
- Heather O'Rourke
- Barret Oliver
- Donna Pescow
- Paul Peterson
- Michelle Phillips
- Lindsay Price
- Robert Reed
- Tony Roberts
- Esther Rolle
- Dick Sargent
- Peter Scolari
- Connie Sellecca
- Ted Shackelford
- Jan Smithers
- Vic Tayback
- Lauren Tewes
- Gordon Thomson
- Dick Van Patten
- Dee Wallace
- Marcia Wallace
- Cassie Yates

== Theme Song ==
The series’ theme song, “Finder of Lost Loves”, was performed by Dionne Warwick and Luther Vandross and written by Burt Bacharach and Carole Bayer Sager. In a revised version with Warwick and Glenn Jones as duet partners, it became an Adult Contemporary chart hit in 1985.

== Episodes ==
No.	Title	Directed by	Written by	Original release date	Prod. code
1	"Maxwell, Ltd."	Bruce Bilson	Jill Baer & Christopher Vane	September 22, 1984	TBA
2	"Yesterday's Child"	Philip Leacock	Bruce Shelly	September 29, 1984	002
3	"Losing Touch"	Philip Leacock	Sandra Kay Siegel	October 13, 1984	004
4	"White Lies"	Don Chaffey	Story by : Peter Gallay; Teleplay by : Liz Coe & Bruce Shelly	October 20, 1984	005
5	"Echoes"	Alf Kjellin	Richard Raskind	October 27, 1984	006
6	"Goodbye, Sara"	Bruce Bilson	Michael Fisher	November 3, 1984	001
7	"Undying Love"	Don Chaffey	Lan O'Kun	November 10, 1984	007
8	"Old Friends"	Bruce Bilson	Jerry Winnick	November 17, 1984	008
9	"Portraits"	Sigmund Neufeld Jr.	Story by : Parke Perine; Teleplay by : J. Miyoko Hensley & Steven Hensley	December 1, 1984	009
10	"A Gift"	Cliff Bole	Liz Coe	December 8, 1984	011
11	"Forgotten Melodies"	Bob Sweeney	Donald Ross	December 22, 1984	010
12	"Last Wish"	Don Chaffey	Bruce Shelly	January 5, 1985	012
13	"Deadly Silence"	Georg Stanford Brown	Christopher Vane & Jill Baer	January 12, 1985	003
14	"Wayward Dreams"	Bruce Bilson	Liz Coe	January 26, 1985	013
15	"From the Heart"	Allen Reisner	Austin & Irma Kalish	February 9, 1985	014
16	"Aftershocks"	Don Chaffey	Chris Manheim	February 16, 1985	015
17	"Tricks"	Allen Reisner	Bruce Shelly & Liz Coe	February 23, 1985	016
18	"Haunted Memories"	Don Chaffey	Aubrey Solomon & Steve Greenberg	March 2, 1985	017
19	"Mr. Wonderful"	Charles Picerni	Jill Baer & Christopher Vane	March 9, 1985	018
20	"Surrogates"	Barbara Peters	Bruce Shelly	March 16, 1985	019
21	"Final Analysis"	Kim Manners	Robert Earll	March 30, 1985	020
22	"Broken Promises"	Don Chaffey	Liz Coe	April 6, 1985	021
23	"Connections"	Jeffrey Hayes	Chris Manheim	April 13, 1985	022
