= Bruce Kalish =

American screenwriter

- Born: Bruce Eliott Kalish; May 22, 1952 (age 74); Los Angeles, California, U.S.
- Occupations: TV screenwriter and producer
- Years active: 1977–2015
- Spouse: Leah Ayres (m. 1990)
- Children: 1

Bruce Elliott Kalish (born May 22, 1952) is a television writer and producer. He is the son of veteran TV producers Austin Kalish and Irma Kalish.

== Career biography ==
He began his career working on shows such as The Incredible Hulk, Mork & Mindy, and served as executive producer on The Fall Guy. His more recent work on The Famous Jett Jackson won numerous awards, including the Gemini award for best show in 2002 and led him to be tapped by Disney as Executive Producer and writer for Power Rangers, starting with 2005's Power Rangers: S.P.D. and ending with 2008's Power Rangers: Jungle Fury. Several of Kalish's former writing partners, such as David Garber joined him when he took the position.

Prior to taking over as executive producer, he had previously written an episode of Power Rangers: Dino Thunder titled "Isn't It Lava-ly".

Kalish's other television credits include Good Times, Eight Is Enough, 227, What's Happening!!, Too Close for Comfort, Strange Days at Blake Holsey High and Aaron Stone.

As of 2021, his last credit was screenwriter for the 2015 short film The 'Thing'.

== Personal life ==
Kalish married actress Leah Ayres in 1990. They have one child together, son Mackenzie (b. 1993).

== Screenwriting credits ==
=== Television ===
- Big John, Little John (1976)
- Good Times (1977-1978)
- C.P.O. Sharkey (1978)
- The Amazing Spider-Man (1978)
- The Incredible Hulk (1978)
- Carter Country (1978-1979)
- Struck by Lightning (1979)
- What’s Happening!! (1979)
- Mork & Mindy (1979-1980)
- Eight Is Enough (1981)
- Too Close for Comfort (1982)
- Lottery! (1983)
- Automan (1983)
- The Fall Guy (1984-1986)
- Rags to Riches (1987)
- The Highwayman (1988)
- Good Morning, Miss Bliss (1988)
- 227 (1988, 1990)
- Alien Nation (1990)
- P.S.I. Luv U (1991)
- Viper (1994)
- Thunder in Paradise (1994)
- One West Waikiki (1994)
- Sweet Valley High (1994)
- Aaahh!! Real Monsters (1994)
- The Sentinel (1996)
- Bruno the Kid (1996)
- Night Man (1997)
- The Journey of Allen Strange (1997)
- The Famous Jett Jackson (1999-2001)
- Strange Days at Blake Holsey High (2002-2003)
- Power Rangers Dino Thunder (2004)

as series head writer:

- Power Rangers S.P.D. (2005)
- Power Rangers Mystic Force (2006)
- Power Rangers Operation Overdrive (2007)
- Power Rangers Jungle Fury (2008)
- Aaron Stone (2009-2010)

=== Film ===
- Dennis the Menace: Dinosaur Hunter (1987)
- Jett Jackson: The Movie (2001)
