= Phi Sigma Sigma =

North American collegiate sorority

- ΦΣΣ
- Founded: November 26, 1913; 112 years ago Hunter College
- Type: Social
- Affiliation: NPC
- Status: Active
- Scope: North America
- Motto: Diokete Hupsala "Aim High"
- Slogan: "Once a Phi Sigma Sigma, always a Phi Sigma Sigma"
- Colors: King Blue Gold
- Symbol: Sphinx
- Flower: American Beauty Rose
- Jewel: Sapphire
- Publication: The Sphinx
- Philanthropy: Phi Sigma Sigma Foundation
- Chapters: 150+ (115 active)
- Members: 60,000 lifetime
- Headquarters: 1213 Liberty Rd, Suite J #335; Eldersburg, Maryland 21784; United States
- Website: phisigmasigma.org

Phi Sigma Sigma (ΦΣΣ), colloquially known as Phi Sig, was the first collegiate nonsectarian sorority to allow membership of women of all faiths and backgrounds.

The sorority was founded on November 26, 1913, and lists 60,000 initiated members, 115 collegiate chapters, and more than 100 alumnae chapters, clubs, and associations in the United States and Canada. Phi Sigma Sigma was founded to establish the twin ideals of promoting the brotherhood of man and alleviation of the world's pain.

Since 1951, the sorority has been a member of the National Panhellenic Conference, the overarching organization of the 26 national sororities in the United States and Canada.

== History ==
Phi Sigma Sigma was founded by ten women on November 26, 1913, at Hunter College, in Manhattan. The sorority's founders were Lillian Gordon Alpern, Josephine Ellison Breakstone, Fay Chertkoff, Estelle Melnick Cole, Jeanette Lipka Furst, Ethel Gordon Kraus, Shirley Cohen Laufer, Claire Wunder McArdle, Rose Sher Seidman, and Gwen Zaliels Snyder.

The original name for the sorority was Phi Sigma Omega, but they later learned this name was already in use by another organization. In 1918, Phi Sigma Sigma expanded by founding its Beta chapter at Tufts University in Medford, Massachusetts, and the Gamma chapter at New York University, although neither of those chapters are currently active. The sorority held its first national convention that year in New York City, where the constitution was adopted, and Fay Chertkoff, one of the founders, was elected Grand Archon.

The sorority first published its official publication, The Sphinx, in 1922.

Phi Sigma Sigma became an associate member of National Panhellenic Conference in 1947 and a full member in 1951. In 1968, the separation of Hunter College's two campuses prompted the original Alpha chapter to divide. Alpha Alpha chapter was installed at the new Herbert Lehman College in the Bronx, while Alpha chapter remained on Hunter College's Park Avenue campus. Neither is still active.

In November 2009, the Delta chapter, at the State University of New York at Buffalo, was reinstalled; making it the oldest active chapter. The second oldest active chapter is the Epsilon chapter at Adelphi University, in Garden City, New York, which was recolonized on December 6, 2008. While other chapters were founded earlier and have been recolonized, the Xi chapter at Temple University is the oldest chapter in continuous existence, having been founded in 1926. The Upsilon chapter (1930) at the University of Manitoba was the first chapter established in Canada.

== Symbols ==
The ΦΣΣ Badge.

The open motto is Diokete Hupsala or "Aim High". The maxim is "Once a Phi Sigma Sigma, always a Phi Sigma Sigma". The acronym LITP is often stated as well. "LITP" stands for "Love in the Pyramid," and is also used to form the basis of the Phi Sigma Sigma hand sign, where the fingers of two hands form a pyramid with a heart inside.

Phi Sigma Sigma's colors are king blue and gold. The official symbol is the Sphinx, while the official jewel is the sapphire. The American Beauty Rose is the official flower.

The original fraternity badge was a Sphinx head with sapphire eyes on a gold base, bearing the Greek letters ΦΣΣ in blue enamel. Later, the fraternity developed a jeweled badge in the form of a gold pyramid with three sapphires in each corner, surmounted by the original Sphinxhead in the middle. The pledge pin is a blue pyramid with a border of gold, on which is written Phi Sigma Sigma's motto.

The coat of arms is a Sphinx head surmounting a ribbon bearing the Greek letters ΦΣΣ, set on a shield of seven bendlets of blue and white, the whole being superimposed on a pyramid with a rose at its apex and twin scrolls bearing the legend Diokete Hupsala and the year 1913 en plaque at the base below.

The sorority's first song, "The Hymn," was written in 1921 by Pearl Lippman of the Alpha chapter and her husband, Arthur Lippman. Phi Sigma Sigma's magazine is The Sphinx. It publishes a biannual alumnae newsletter, The Rose.

== Philanthropy ==
To facilitate philanthropic activities, the Phi Sigma Sigma Foundation was created in 1969 by Jeanine Jacobs Goldberg, who was the foundation's first president. The Phi Sigma Sigma Foundation provides scholarships and educational grants, as well as leadership programming to collegiate and alumnae members. The National Kidney Foundation was Phi Sigma Sigma's primary philanthropic endeavor from 1971 until 2013. Since then, Phi Sigma Sigma has worked to educate people about kidney disease, as well as organ and tissue donation and transplantation. The Phi Sigma Sigma Foundation was a major sponsor of the National Kidney Foundation U.S. Transplant Games, a national Olympics-style event where organ-donor recipients competed in various athletic competitions.

Following the September 11 attacks, the Phi Sigma Sigma Foundation established the Twin Ideals Fund to assist disaster victims. Named for Phi Sigma Sigma's twin ideals to promote the brotherhood of man and alleviate the world's pain, the fund has contributed to aid organizations in the aftermath of the 2004 Indian Ocean earthquake and tsunami and Hurricane Katrina.

A three-year process began in 2011 to identify a new premier philanthropic partner. The first step was to define the organization's philanthropic focus. Through a member survey and focus groups, the committee settled on school/college readiness as its philanthropic focus. The next step was to create and disseminate an RFP (Request for Proposal) to philanthropic groups. Applications were submitted and the committee interviewed ideal candidates. The result was the adoption of two non-profits, Practice Makes Perfect and Kids in Need Foundation. Both aligned well with the Foundation's mission and the school/college readiness focus. It was decided by Practice Makes Perfect to become a for-profit organization in 2016. The Phi Sigma Sigma Foundation could no longer support Practice Makes Perfect according to the regulations of a 501(c)3 organization. Phi Sigma Sigma is proud to grow its partnership with KINF and continues to support the efforts of KINF through its many backpack builds and work with local low-income students and schools.

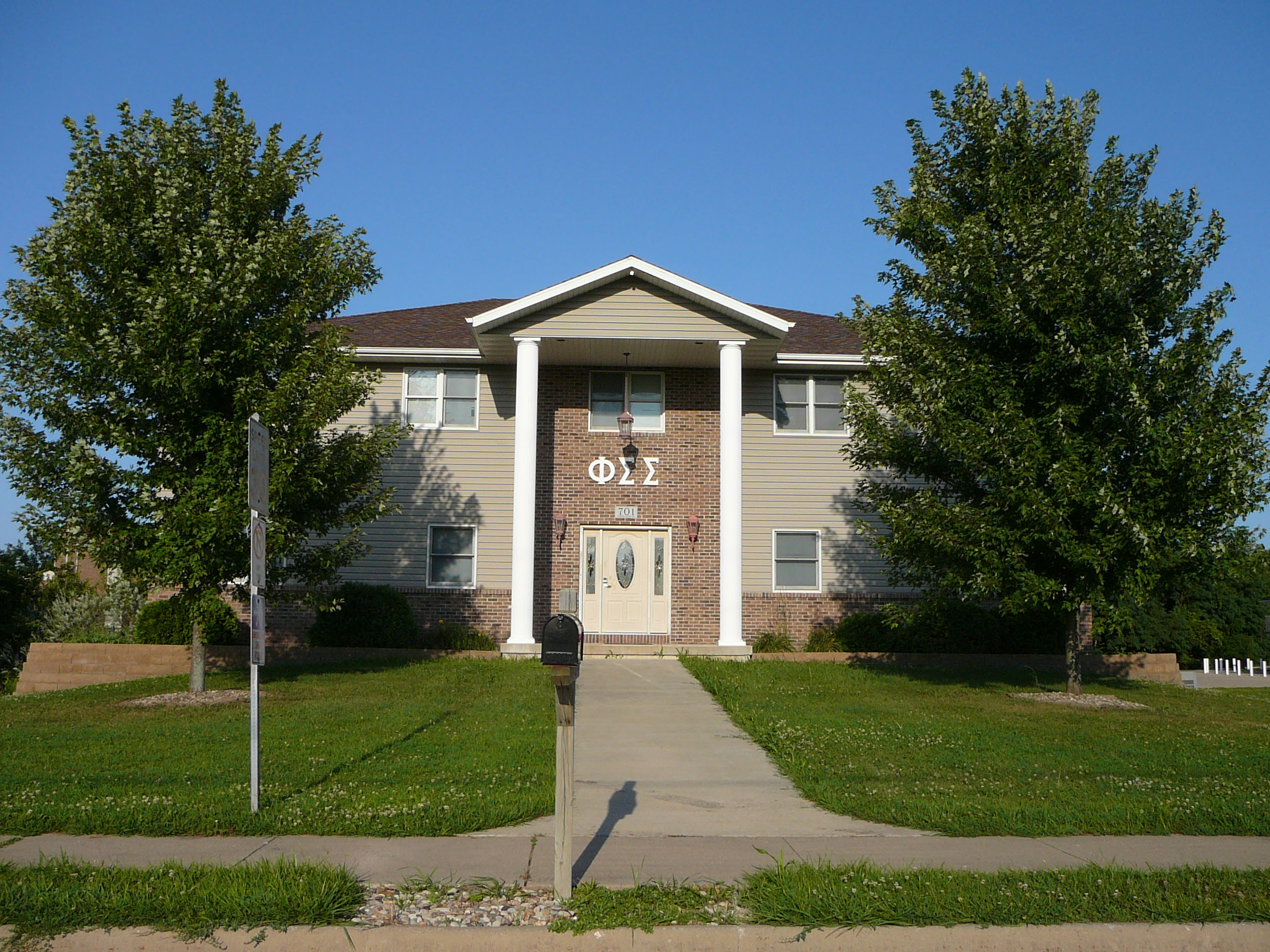
Epsilon Psi chapter house at Western Illinois University

== Notable members ==
| Name | Chapter | Sector | Notability | References |
|---|---|---|---|---|
| Amy Diaz | Iota Theta | Entertainment | Miss Teen USA 2001, Miss USA 2008 (top 15), Miss Earth USA 2009, Winner of Amazing Race season 23 along with her boyfriend Jason Case. | |
| Alex Flinn | Beta Theta | Literature | New York Times Bestselling author of Beastly. | |
| Irma Ginsberg Kalish | Pi | Entertainment | Producer and screenwriter, credited with over 300 television scripts. | |
| Andrea Kremer | Nu | Entertainment | Correspondent for HBO's Real Sports with Bryant Gumbel, sideline reporter for NBC Sunday Night Football, and ESPN's first female correspondent | |
| Andrea LaFontaine | Delta Iota | Government | Michigan State Representative | |
| Tatyana McFadden | Theta | Sports | Seventeen-time Paralympic medalist. | |
| Irna Phillips | Theta | Entertainment | "Mother" of the modern soap opera and creator of Guiding Light, As the World Turns, Days of Our Lives, and Another World. | |
| Nancy Pimental | Gamma Iota | Entertainment | Screenplay writer for The Sweetest Thing, writer for the TV series South Park. and co-host of Win Ben Stein's Money | |
| Zelda Rubinstein | Iota | Entertainment | Actress and activist. | |
| Mercedes Schlapp | Delta Kappa | Government | White House Director of Strategic Communications 2017–2019. | |

== See also ==
- List of social sororities and women's fraternities
- List of Jewish fraternities and sororities
