= Carter Country =

American television series

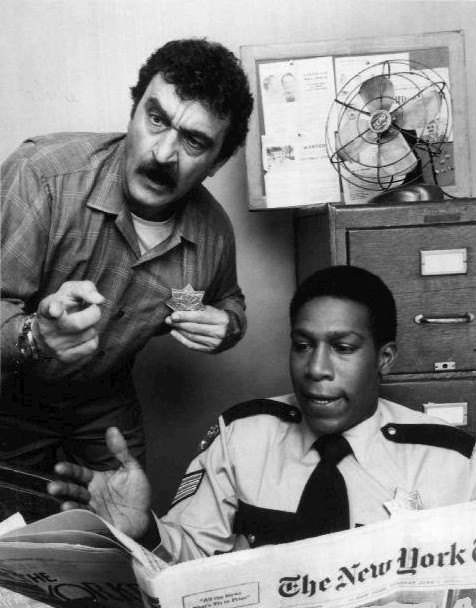
- Victor French and Kene Holliday.
- Genre: Sitcom
- Created by: Phil Doran; Douglas Arango
- Developed by: Bud Yorkin; Saul Turteltaub; Bernie Orenstein
- Written by: Douglas Arango; Phil Doran; David Garber; Kevin Hartigan; Barry Meadow
- Directed by: Peter Baldwin; Bud Yorkin
- Starring: Victor French; Kene Holliday; Richard Paul; Harvey Vernon; Barbara Cason; Vernee Watson; Guich Koock
- Composer: Pete Rugolo
- Country of origin: United States
- Original language: English
- No. of seasons: 2
- No. of episodes: 44

Production
- Executive producers: Austin Kalish; Irma Kalish; Bernie Orenstein; Saul Turteltaub; Bud Yorkin
- Producer: Douglas Arango
- Production company: Turteltaub-Orenstein-Yorkin Productions (TOY)

Original release
- Network: ABC
- Release: September 15, 1977 – August 23, 1979

Carter Country is an American sitcom that aired on ABC from September 15, 1977, to August 23, 1979. It starred Victor French and Kene Holliday. A young Melanie Griffith appeared in two episodes.

== Synopsis ==
Carter Country is set in the fictional small town of Clinton Corners in Georgia (presumably near Plains, Georgia, the town from which U.S. President Jimmy Carter hailed, thus the title) and features French as police chief Roy Mobey and Holliday as city-bred, college-educated Sergeant Curtis Baker.

Richard Paul as Mayor Teddy Burnside, Harvey Vernon as racist officer Jasper DeWitt, and Barbara Cason as town employee Cloris Phebus round out the cast. DeWitt is shown to be a member of the local branch of the Ku Klux Klan and he often makes disparaging comments against minorities, but is still a loyal and honest law enforcement officer. In several episodes, it is hinted that his racist attitude is an act and that he joined the KKK in order to keep an eye on their activities. Separate from his racism, DeWitt resents Baker for taking the sergeant's position, to which DeWitt felt entitled due to his tenure.

Additional comic support is provided by Texas-born actor Guich Koock, who plays the part of goofy deputy Harley Puckett. Vernee Watson plays the mayor's educated secretary and Baker's love interest. The plot centers around the stereotypical racism of the Deep South, and has often been characterized as being an irreverent, comic version of the movie In the Heat of the Night, especially with the aspect of an educated African American man coming to a small southern town to work as a police officer.

The character of Mayor Burnside coined a minor catchphrase with his manic "Handle it, Roy, handle it!", used when delegating various details to Chief Mobey such as fixing a parking ticket. If Mobey protests or asks any further questions, Burnside stifles further discussion with a dismissive hand gesture and a further "Handle it, handle it, handle it!" Burnside often introduces himself to members of the public as "Teddy Burnside, your mayor by a landslide."

== Ratings ==
The first season ranked 32nd out of 104 shows, and averaged a 19.6 rating. The second season ranked 70th out of 114 shows, with an average 15.6/27 rating/share.

== Reception ==
Television critics were split on the show. The Boston Globe said, "The plots are tired. The stereotypes are worn. The jokes are the oldest known..." The Charlotte Observer added "The show is lacking in humor." and was "...the story of a police station chock-full of dumb southern hicks." Noel Holston of Orlando's Sentinel Star said simply, "Jimmy should sue" citing that its "portraying of black characters as shuffling, smiling simpletons..." and that it "leans heavily on insults and redneck jokes..."

However, the show did have its supporters. In The Pittsburgh Press, Barbara Holsopple noted, "The characters are stereotypes...But they are funny, likable and startlingly honest." Lee Winfrey of The Philadelphia Inquirer admired that "The main characters in 'Carter Country' look human..."

== Episodes ==
=== Season 1 (1977–78) ===
No. overall	No. in season	Title	Directed by	Written by	Original release date
1	1	"Hail to the Chief"	Bud Yorkin	Douglas Arango & Phil Doran	September 15, 1977
2	2	"Beating the Pounds"	Peter Baldwin	Al Gordon & Jack Mendelsohn	September 22, 1977
3	3	"Out of the Closet"	Peter Baldwin	Douglas Arango & Phil Doran	September 29, 1977
4	4	"The Fireside Burnside Budget Chat"	Peter Baldwin	George Arthur Bloom	October 6, 1977
5	5	"Baker Buys a House: Part 1"	Peter Baldwin	S : Mark Fink; T : Al Gordon & Jack Mendelsohn	October 20, 1977
6	6	"Baker Buys a House: Part 2"	Peter Baldwin	S : Mark Fink; T : Al Gordon & Jack Mendelsohn	October 27, 1977
7	7	"Bye, Bye Baker"	Peter Baldwin	Kevin Hartigan & David Garber	November 3, 1977
8	8	"Senior Citizen Siege"	Peter Baldwin	Kevin Hartigan & David Garber	November 17, 1977
9	9	"Chicks and Turkeys"	Peter Baldwin	David Pollock & Elias Davis	November 24, 1977
10	10	"Chief to Chief"	Peter Baldwin	George Arthur Bloom	December 1, 1977
11	11	"Union vs. the Confederacy"	Peter Baldwin	Sheldon Bull	December 8, 1977
12	12	"A-Hunting We Will Go"	Peter Baldwin	Guy Thomas	December 15, 1977
13	13	"By the Light of the Moonlight"	Peter Baldwin	Al Gordon & Jack Mendelsohn	December 22, 1977
14	14	"The Physical"	Peter Baldwin	Bruce Kalish & Philip John Taylor	January 5, 1978
15	15	"Roy's Separation"	Peter Baldwin	David Pollock & Elias Davis	January 12, 1978
16	16	"Red Armstrong, Goodbye"	Peter Baldwin	Phil Doran & Douglas Arango	January 19, 1978
17	17	"Ballots for Burnside"	Peter Baldwin	Tom Moore & Jeremy Stevens	January 26, 1978
18	18	"The Chief's Dressing Down"	Peter Baldwin	Mort Scharfman & Harvey Weitzman	February 2, 1978
19	19	"All About Floyd"	Peter Baldwin	Ann Gibbs & Joel Kimmel	February 9, 1978
20	20	"Roy Pays His Taxes"	Peter Baldwin	Phil Doran & Douglas Arango	February 23, 1978
21	21	"Roy's Encounter"	Peter Baldwin	Alan Eisenstock & Larry Mintz	May 9, 1978
22	22	"Baker Saves a Life"	Peter Baldwin	Mort Scharfman & Harvey Weitzman	May 16, 1978

=== Season 2 (1978–79) ===
No. overall	No. in season	Title	Directed by	Written by	Original release date
23	1	"One of Our Chiefs Is Missing"	Peter Baldwin	Austin & Irma Kalish	September 23, 1978
24	2	"The Tracy Report"	Peter Baldwin	Mort Scharfman & Harvey Weitzman	September 30, 1978
25	3	"The Selling of the Mayor: Part 1"	Peter Baldwin	Phil Doran & Douglas Arango	October 21, 1978
26	4	"The Selling of the Mayor: Part 2"	Peter Baldwin	Phil Doran & Douglas Arango	October 28, 1978
27	5	"Poor Butterfly"	Peter Baldwin	Marty Brill & Barry Meadow	November 11, 1978
28	6	"Gambler's Unanimous"	Peter Baldwin	Mark Fink	November 25, 1978
29	7	"Roy Makes the Grade"	Peter Baldwin	Haskell Barkin	December 2, 1978
30	8	"Hurricane Jasper"	Peter Baldwin	S : Jack Turley; S/T : Martin Rips & Joseph Staretski	December 16, 1978
31	9	"Firing of a Harley"	Peter Baldwin	Saul Turteltaub & Bernie Orenstein	December 23, 1978
32	10	"Owed to Billy Joe"	Peter Baldwin	Michael S. Baser & Kim Weiskopf	January 6, 1979
33	11	"The Russians Are Coming"	Gary Shimokawa	David Braff & Nick Thiel	January 13, 1979
34	12	"Happy Anniversary"	Peter Baldwin	Bruce Kalish & Philip John Taylor	March 29, 1979
35	13	"Teddy the Tiger"	Peter Baldwin	Phil Doran & Douglas Arango	April 5, 1979
36	14	"New Kid in Town"	Peter Baldwin	Austin & Irma Kalish	April 12, 1979
37	15	"Baker's First Day"	Peter Baldwin	Mort Scharfman & Harvey Weitzman	April 19, 1979
38	16	"The Last Dinosaur"	Peter Baldwin	Michael S. Baser & Kim Weiskopf	April 26, 1979
39	17	"The Big Move: Part 1"	Peter Baldwin	Mark Fink	May 10, 1979
40	18	"The Big Move: Part 2"	Peter Baldwin	Michael S. Baser & Kim Weiskopf	May 17, 1979
41	19	"The Big Move: Part 3"	Peter Baldwin	Richard Powell	May 24, 1979
42	20	"Teddy's Folly"	Peter Baldwin	Phil Doran & Douglas Arango	May 31, 1979
43	21	"The Prisoner of Clinton Corners"	Peter Baldwin	Mort Scharfman & Harvey Weitzman	June 7, 1979
44	22	"The Abominable Showman"	Peter Baldwin	Mort Scharfman & Harvey Weitzman	June 21, 1979
