= Naomi Gurian =

American novelist

- Born: March 1, 1933 (age 93); New York City, U.S.
- Education: University of California, Los Angeles; San Fernando Valley College of Law
- Occupations: Lawyer; novelist
- Children: 3
- Parent(s): Elias Jermoe Gurian; Ethel Lipman
- Writing career
- Pen name: Cady Kalian

Naomi Gurian (born March 1, 1933) is a retired California lawyer and former executive director of the Writers Guild of America, west.

Born in New York City, her parents Elias Jerome and Ethel (Lipman) Gurian moved to Los Angeles and she got her bachelor's degree from UCLA in 1955. After working as a legal assistant for some years, she graduated from San Fernando Valley College of Law in 1976. That same year she passed the California bar and went to work as an associate attorney at the Writers Guild of America. In 1978 she became the assistant executive director, and in 1982 became the executive director, a position she held until 1990 when she returned to the practice of law. In 2000 she closed her legal practice, and took inactive status in the State Bar effective 1 January 2001.

Gurian married twice, and had three children by her first husband. In 2006 she and her collaborator, Irma Kalish, published their first mystery novel As Dead As It Gets under the pseudonym Cady Kalian. It was followed by A Few Good Murders in 2007.
