= Larry "Flash" Jenkins =

American actor and filmmaker (1955–2019)

- Born: May 10, 1955; Long Island, New York, U.S.
- Died: April 25, 2019 (aged 63); Los Angeles, California, U.S.
- Other names: Flash
- Education: Olive–Harvey College
- Alma mater: Southern Illinois University; Pepperdine University
- Occupations: Actor, film director, producer, screenwriter
- Years active: 1978–2019
- Spouse(s): Michele (1984–1996); Jean Coleman (1997–2019)
- Children: 1

Larry "Flash" Jenkins (May 10, 1955 – April 25, 2019) was an American actor, film director, producer, and screenwriter.

== Early life, family and education ==
Jenkins was born on Long Island, New York. He graduated from Fenger High School in Chicago, Illinois, where he was on the baseball and bowling teams. He attended Olive–Harvey College for a year, then Southern Illinois University for a year, then Pepperdine University in California (so he could pursue an acting career), making Dean's List at all schools.

== Career ==
=== Acting ===
Jenkins starred in the television series The White Shadow as Wardell Stone, Bay City Blues and Finder of Lost Loves.

Jenkins was also known for his performances in minor but memorable roles in such films as Ferris Bueller's Day Off and Fletch as the junkie and informant Gummy.

=== Production ===
Jenkins founded his own production companies in October 2005, Flashworks Productions and Gold Coast Productions LLC, in Los Angeles, California.

Jenkins wrote, produced, directed and starred in the comedy film Marriage Vows (out December 2013), the gospel musical film Don't Touch, If You Ain't Prayed (2014 release) and gospel/romantic comedy House of Grace. He wrote and produced the gospel musical film Pastor Jones and produced the hip hop comedy film Ms. B's Hair Salon. All executive produced by Kenneth Halsband, who served as executive in charge of production for The Fighter and Limitless, starring Robert De Niro. Currently released on DVD/video is Brothers in Arms for Screen Gems, on which Larry served as a co-producer as well as co-starred, and Go For Broke II, which Larry starred opposite Glenn Plummer. He served as executive producer for the hit DVD film When Thugs Cry. Larry also produced and wrote the first draft for the Black Christ Film titled Color of the Cross.

== Personal life ==
From 1984 to 1996, Larry was married to Michele Jenkins. He married Jean Coleman Jenkins in 1997. They resided in the Hancock Park section of Los Angeles, California. He had a son, Jeffrey.

Jenkins was a part of the worship group of West Angeles Church of God in Los Angeles. He had worked with Bishop Charles Edward Blake Sr. and participated in many church activities, including church basketball team games.

Jenkins died on April 25, 2019, of a heart attack in Los Angeles, California, at age 63.

== Selected filmography ==
=== Actor ===
- M*A*S*H (1979, TV series) as Private North
- The White Shadow (1979–1981, TV series) as Wardell Stone / Student
- Quincy, M.E. (1982, TV series) as Walder
- Lou Grant (1982, TV series) as Lionel
- Young Doctors in Love (1982) as The Hospital Staff – Paul the Orderly
- Lookin' to Get Out (1982) as Parking Attendant – Brings Up the Car
- Mr. Mom (1983) as Camera Asst.
- Bay City Blues (1983, TV series) as Lynwood Scott
- T. J. Hooker (1984, TV series) as Toothpick / Willie Joe Ellington Brown III
- Body Double (1984) as Assistant Director
- Alice (1984, TV series) as Howie
- Finder of Lost Loves (1985, TV series) as Lyman Whittaker
- Fletch (1985) as Gummy
- Ferris Bueller's Day Off (1986) as Attendant's Co-Pilot
- Armed and Dangerous (1986) as Raisin
- What's Happening Now!! (1986, TV series) as The Mailman
- Prison (1987) as Hershey
- The Presidio (1988) as MP Dutton
- Elvira: Mistress of the Dark (1988) as Technical Director
- The Hogan Family (1988, TV series) as Stew Lyons
- Pucker Up and Bark Like a Dog (1989) as The Head Waiter
- Genuine Risk (1990) as Horseplayer #1
- Home Improvement (1995, TV series) as Bud
- Brooklyn South (1997, TV series) as Polo
- Providence (1999, TV series)
- EDtv (1999) as Husband
- The Fugitive (2001, TV series) as Antoine Bishop
- To Protect and Serve (2001) as Black Engineer
- Go for Broke 2 (2005) as Detective Loon
- Don't Touch If You Ain't Prayed (2005) as Pastor Bill Worthy
- The Shield (2006, TV series) as Big D
- House of Grace (2006) as Flash – Crackhead #1
- When a Woman's Fed Up (2013) as Leroy
- The Congregation (2014) as Vernon Pride
- Hunter Gatherer (2016) as Robert fix it guy
- Marriage Vows (2017) as Danny Wills
- Low Town (2017) as Henry Felder

=== Director ===
- Don't Touch If You Ain't Prayed (2005)
- House of Grace (2006)
- Marriage Vows (2013)

=== Producer ===
- From Lara with Love (2000)
- Brothers in Arms (2005)
- Color of the Cross (2006)
- Sorority Sister Slaughter (2007)
- Marriage Vows (2013)

=== Writer ===
- Pastor Jones (2005)
- Don't Touch If You Ain't Prayed (2005)
- House of Grace (2006)
