= Good Times =

American television sitcom (1974–1979)

- Genre: Sitcom
- Created by: Eric Monte; Mike Evans
- Developed by: Norman Lear
- Directed by: Herbert Kenwith (seasons 1–3); Various (season 1); Gerren Keith (seasons 4–6)
- Starring: Esther Rolle; John Amos; Ja'Net DuBois; Ralph Carter; Bern Nadette Stanis; Jimmie Walker; Johnny Brown; Janet Jackson; Ben Powers
- Theme music composer: Dave Grusin; Alan and Marilyn Bergman
- Opening theme: "Good Times" performed by Jim Gilstrap and Blinky Williams
- Composers: Dave Grusin; Alan and Marilyn Bergman
- Country of origin: United States
- Original language: English
- No. of seasons: 6
- No. of episodes: 133 (list of episodes)

Production
- Executive producers: Norman Lear (1974–75); Allan Manings (1975–77); Austin and Irma Kalish (1977–78); Norman Paul (1978–79)
- Producers: Allan Manings (1974–75); Jack Elinson (1975–76); Norman Paul (1975–76); Austin and Irma Kalish (1976–77); Lloyd Turner (1977–78); Gordon Mitchell (1977–78); Sid Dorfman (1978–79)
- Production locations: CBS Television City, Hollywood, California (1974–75); Metromedia Square, Hollywood, California (1975–79)
- Camera setup: Multi-camera
- Running time: 22–24 minutes
- Production company: Tandem Productions

Original release
- Network: CBS
- Release: February 8, 1974 – August 1, 1979

Related
- All in the Family; Maude; Checking In; The Jeffersons; Archie Bunker's Place; Gloria; 704 Hauser; Good Times: Black Again

Good Times is an American television sitcom that aired for six seasons on CBS, from February 8, 1974, to August 1, 1979. Created by Eric Monte and Mike Evans and developed by executive producer Norman Lear, it was television's first African-American two-parent family sitcom. It is a spin-off of Maude, which itself spun off from All in the Family.

This was the last sitcom Bud Yorkin produced before he ended his partnership with Norman Lear and Tandem Productions; two years later he formed TOY Productions with Saul Turteltaub and Bernie Orenstein.

Good Times tackled challenging and complex issues, such as gang warfare, racism, widowhood, poverty, education, child abuse, unemployment, evictions, financial struggles, bigamy, paraplegia, dating, stealing, suicide, mugging, engagements, affairs, drug addiction, and rent parties.

== Synopsis ==
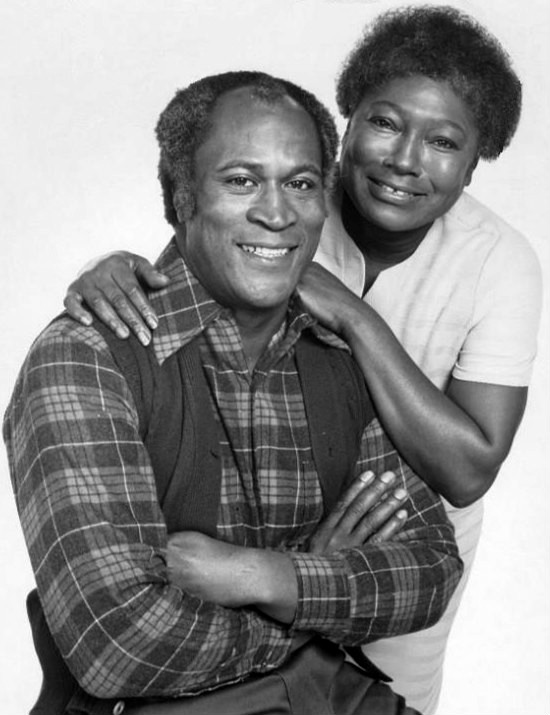
John Amos and Esther Rolle, 1974

Florida and James (renamed from Henry) Evans and their three children live at 963 North Gilbert Avenue, apartment 17C, in a public housing project in a poor, black inner-city Chicago neighborhood. The project is unnamed on the show but is implicitly the infamous Cabrini–Green Homes, shown in the opening and closing credits. Florida and James have three children: James Jr., also known as "J.J.", a budding artist and illustrator who thinks of himself as a Casanova and achieves both success and rejection on his path to monetize his talent into a career; Thelma, a bright girl who takes education very seriously as a way to help her family and is shown attending high school and community college; and Michael, whose passionate activism and support for the Black community and Black issues causes his father to call him "the militant midget".

When the series begins, J.J. is 17 (portrayed by 26-year-old Jimmie Walker, who was just seven and a half years younger than co-star John Amos), Thelma 16, and Michael 11. Their exuberant neighbor and Florida's best friend is Willona Woods, a divorcée who works at a boutique. Their building superintendent is Nathan Bookman (seasons 2–6), whom James, Willona, and later J.J. call "Buffalo Butt" or, even more derisively, "Booger".

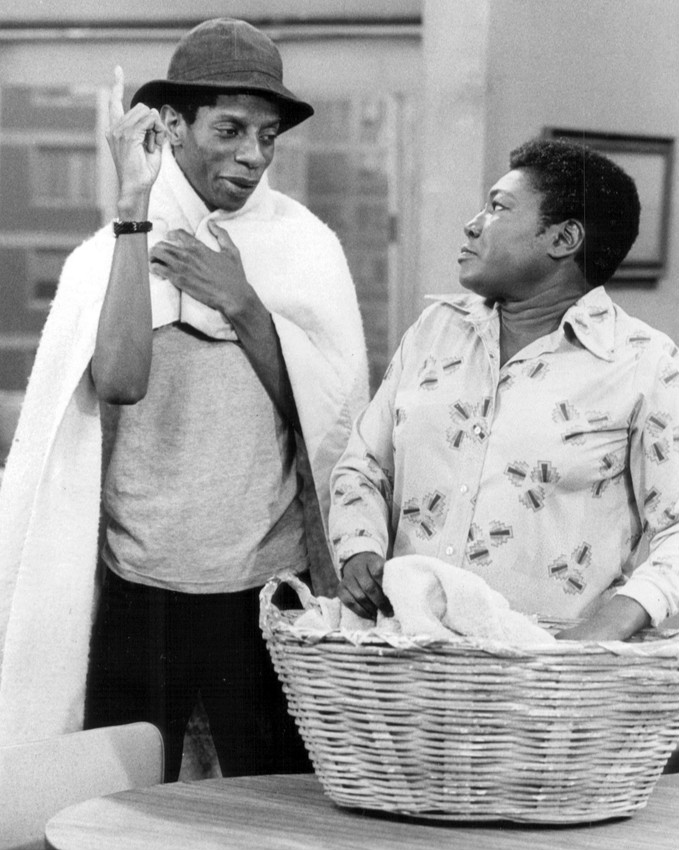
Jimmie Walker and Esther Rolle, 1974

The characters originated on the sitcom Maude as Florida and Henry Evans, with Florida employed as Maude Findlay's housekeeper in Tuckahoe, New York, and Henry employed as a New York City firefighter. When producers decided to feature Florida on her own show, they changed the characters' history to fit a new series that was well into development rather than start from scratch to create a consistent starring vehicle, even though it meant changing their Black middle-class family into a poverty-stricken lower-class family. Henry's name became James, and he worked various odd jobs due to having only a sixth-grade education. There is no mention of Maude, but in the episode "The Checkup", Florida mentions having formerly worked as a maid. Additionally, the couple's location was now Chicago.

Good Times deals with the characters' attempts to overcome poverty, living in high-rise public housing in Chicago. James Evans often works at least two jobs, mostly manual labor such as dishwasher or construction worker. Though he is often unemployed, he is a proud man who will not accept charity. He sometimes hustles money playing pool, although Florida disapproves of this.

== Episodes ==
Season	Episodes	Originally released	
Season	Episodes	First released	Last released
1	13	February 8, 1974	May 10, 1974
2	24	September 10, 1974	March 18, 1975
3	24	September 9, 1975	March 2, 1976
4	24	September 22, 1976	March 30, 1977
5	24	September 21, 1977	April 3, 1978
6	24	September 16, 1978	August 1, 1979

== Cast and characters ==
=== Main ===
Actor	Character	Seasons					
Actor	Character	1	2	3	4	5	6
Esther Rolle	Florida Evans	Main	Main	Main	Main		Main
John Amos	James Evans	Main	Main	Main			
Ja'Net DuBois	Willona Woods	Main	Main	Main	Main	Main	Main
Ralph Carter	Michael Evans	Main	Main	Main	Main	Main	Main
Bern Nadette Stanis (Note: Bern Nadette Stanis was credited as "Bern Nadette" during early episodes of season one, and later as "Bernnadette Stanis".)	Thelma Evans Anderson	Main	Main	Main	Main	Main	Main
Jimmie Walker	James "J.J." Evans Jr.	Main	Main	Main	Main	Main	Main
Johnny Brown	Nathan Bookman		Recurring	Recurring	Recurring	Main	Main
Janet Jackson	Millicent "Penny" Gordon Woods					Main	Main
Ben Powers	Keith Anderson						Main

=== Supporting ===
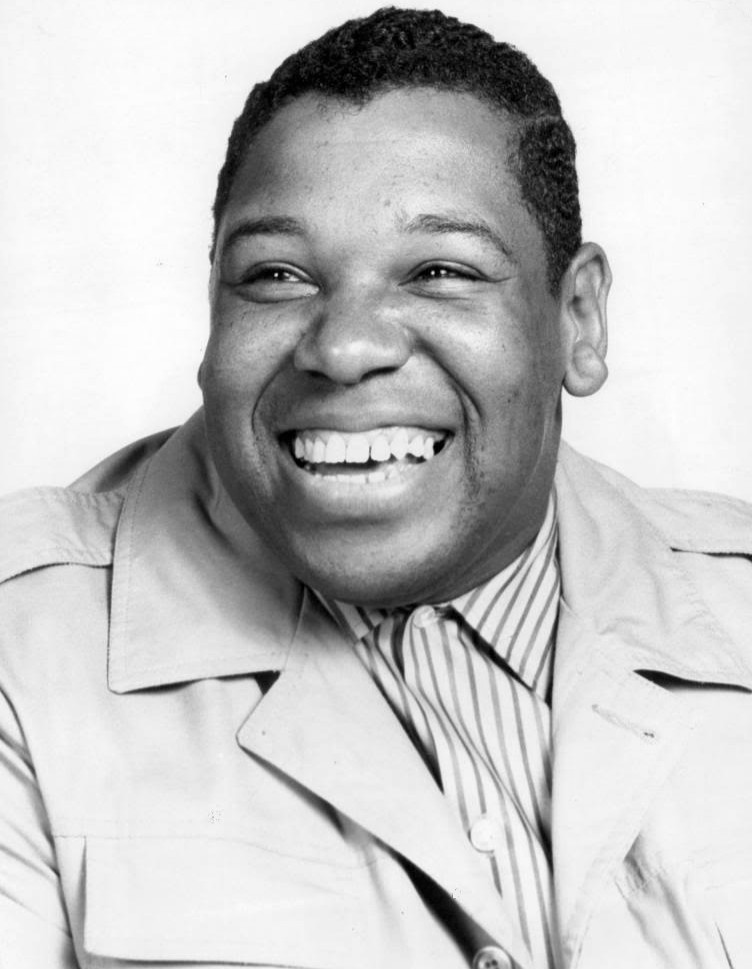
Johnny Brown as superintendent Nathan ("Buffalo Butt") Bookman

- Ned the Wino (Raymond Allen) is the local drunk who frequents the neighborhood and the apartment building where the Evans family reside. In the season one episode "Black Jesus", J.J. uses Ned the Wino as the model for a portrait of Jesus. Another episode is centered on Michael's plan to "clean up" Ned and get him off the booze by letting him stay at the Evanses' house.
- Carl Dixon (Moses Gunn) is a shop owner for whom Michael briefly works. Despite their religious differences, Carl and Florida begin dating and become engaged in the final episode of season four. Carl breaks off the engagement after he is diagnosed with lung cancer. After a talk from Bookman, Carl again asks Florida for her hand in marriage. The two marry off-screen and move to Arizona. Florida returns at the beginning of season six, this time without Carl for Thelma's wedding. Carl is referenced briefly in that season's second episode "Florida's Homecoming Part 2", but he is never mentioned again (Florida continues to use the surname Evans instead of Dixon). (Rolle decided to come back to the show on the condition the character of Carl Dixon was written out.) While it is not mentioned onscreen, it is implied that Carl died from lung cancer.
- Marion "Sweet Daddy" Williams (Theodore Wilson) is a menacing neighborhood numbers runner and pimp, who has a reputation for wearing flashy clothing and jewelry. He is usually accompanied by bodyguards (one portrayed by Bubba Smith, the other by series painter Ernie Barnes) and comes across as cool and threatening, but has shown a soft heart on occasion, particularly when he decided not to take an antique locket (to settle a debt) that Florida had given to Thelma because it had reminded him of his late mother. (Wilson also plays a club owner named Stanley in the season four episode, "The Comedian and the Loan Sharks").
- Alderman Fred C. Davis (Albert Reed Jr.) is a local politician with a slightly shady disposition whom the Evans generally despise. Spoofing President Richard M. Nixon, he would state in a speech, "I am not a crook". He frequently relies on the support of the Evans family (his "favorite project family") for re-election or support and resorts to threats of eviction to secure their support. In a running joke, Alderman Davis frequently antagonizes Willona by "forgetting" her name, and calling her another similar-sounding name that began with a "W" (such as Wilhemina, Winnifrieda, Winsomnium, Wyomia and even Waldorf-Astoria), thus earning him her everlasting ire as well as the nickname "Baldy".
- Lenny (Dap "Sugar" Willie) (also known as "Lootin" Lenny), is a neighborhood hustler and peddler who tries to sell presumably stolen items that are usually attached to the lining of his fur coat. He usually approaches people with a laid-back rap and a rhyme, such as "my name is Len-nay, if I ain't got it, there ain't an-nay" (in a style similar to Rudy Ray Moore). He is typically rebuffed by the people he approaches and responds by saying "that's cold" or uses a small brush to "brush off" the negativity.
- "Grandpa" Henry Evans (Richard Ward) is James's long-lost father. He abandoned the family years before because he was ashamed that he could not do more to provide for them. This deeply hurt James, who disregarded his father's existence, telling everyone that he was dead. Thelma learns about her grandfather while doing some family research. She meets him and invites him to the Evanses' home to surprise James for his birthday, not knowing that James was well aware of his whereabouts but chose to stay out of his life. After Henry arrives at the Evans home and meets the rest of the family, he realizes that James would not welcome him in the home and decides to leave. Florida convinces him to stay and talk to James and explains that there may never be another chance to do so. Henry and James have a heart-to-heart talk, with Henry being remorseful and apologetic. James ultimately forgives his father. After James's death, the Evans family embraces Henry into the family, alongside his common law (and eventually legal) wife Lena (Paulene Myers) in later episodes.
- Wanda Williams (Helen Martin) is another resident in the apartment building where the Evans reside. Earlier episodes show her at a women's support group, and the tenants rallying around her by giving her a rent party. Later episodes show her appearing and crying at several funerals, whether she knew the person or not, thus earning her the nickname "Weeping Wanda" from J.J. and Willona.
- Lynnetta Gordon (Chip Fields) is Penny's abusive biological mother whose first appearance is in the four-part fifth season opening episode, "The Evans Get Involved". Penny's father abandoned her mom when Lynnetta became pregnant at 16. As a result, she takes her anger and frustrations out on Penny, including burning her with a hot iron. After the abuse is finally brought to light, she tells the Evans family that she herself was abused as a child. She gets into a fighting match with Willona and Thelma and they plead for her to seek therapy. Just before she disappears, she expresses regret for hurting her child, telling Willona that Penny deserves better than her. This clears the way for Willona to adopt Penny. She reappears more than a year later, in the sixth-season episode, "A Matter of Mothers", having gotten married and reveals that her new husband is from a very wealthy family. She uses her husband's wealth to send Penny anonymous gifts and, in an effort to regain custody of Penny, also attempts to frame Willona as an unfit adoptive mother who throws wild parties with less than wholesome attendees. Her scheme is exposed by being recorded on tape admitting that the scheme was a set up to get Penny back. After Lynnetta tries to get the tape from Penny and threatens to hurt her again, which is stopped by Willona, Penny tells Lynnetta that no matter what anyone says, she will always consider Willona her real mother. Devastated, Lynnetta decides to drop the charges against Willona and leaves Penny with her, never to be seen again.
- Cleatus (John Bailey) is a cousin of J.J. Evans, Thelma Evans Anderson and Michael Evans and nephew of Florida Evans and James Evans. He made one appearance in the episode "Cousin Cleatus".
- Violet Bookman (Marilyn Coleman) is the wife of Bookman (episodes: "Bye, Bye Bookman" and "Willona, the Other Woman" in season 5).

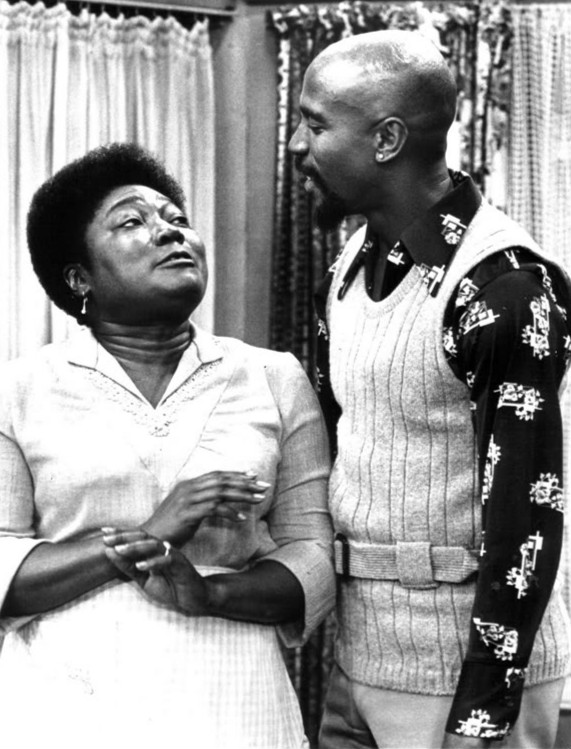
Louis Gossett Jr. as Florida's brother, Wilbert

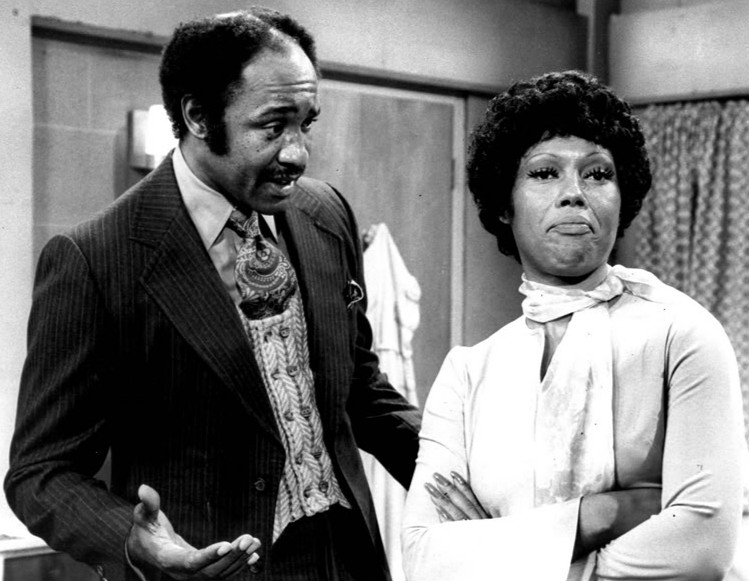
J. A. Preston as Walter Ingles, friend of Willona Woods (Ja'Net DuBois) (1975)

== Production ==
Good Times was created by Eric Monte and actor Mike Evans. The series also features a character named "Michael Evans" after Evans, who portrayed Lionel Jefferson on the Lear-produced series All in the Family and The Jeffersons. Monte also created another successful black sitcom What's Happening!! (without Norman Lear, but with Saul Turteltaub, Bernie Orenstein and Bud Yorkin, all of whom worked for Lear), for ABC, which was based on the film Cooley High.

=== Theme song and opening sequence ===
Good Times theme
- Sample [0:13] via

The gospel-styled theme song was composed by Dave Grusin with lyrics written by Alan and Marilyn Bergman. It was sung by Jim Gilstrap and Motown singer Blinky Williams with a gospel choir providing background vocals. Because of the singing style of the song, and the audio mix, the lyrics to the theme song are notorious for being hard to discern, notably the line "hangin' in a chow line"/"hangin' in and jivin'" (depending on the source used). Dave Chappelle used this part of the lyrics as a quiz in his "I Know Black People" skit on Chappelle's Show in which the former was claimed as the answer. Closed captioning on streaming services, and the insert for the Season One DVD box set, have the lyric as "hangin' in a chow line". The Bergmans, along with Bern Nadette Stanis, confirmed that the lyric is actually "hangin' in and jivin'". Slightly different lyrics were used for the closing credits, with the song beginning on a verse instead of the chorus. In later seasons, the Ernie Barnes painting The Sugar Shack sometimes appears in the opening and/or closing credits.

=== Casting ===
Chip Fields was one of the finalists for the role of Thelma, but Bernadette Stanis was selected. Haywood Nelson screen tested and was hired for the role of the youngest Evans child, Michael, but was replaced by Ralph Carter who, at the time, had more experience in front of a live audience. Carter was a cast member in the Broadway musical Raisin and the producers of Raisin were initially reluctant to accept Tandem Productions' buyout offer. While Carter's contract was being negotiated, another young actor, Larry Fishburne (later Laurence) filled the role of Michael during initial rehearsals for Good Times. Carter, Nelson, and Fishburne (and their families) were all close friends, each close in age, each having Broadway experience, and living in the same neighborhood in Brooklyn, New York. Because of a contractual obligation, early episodes of Good Times contain a notice in the credits: "Ralph Carter appears courtesy of the Broadway musical Raisin."

=== Cast conflicts ===
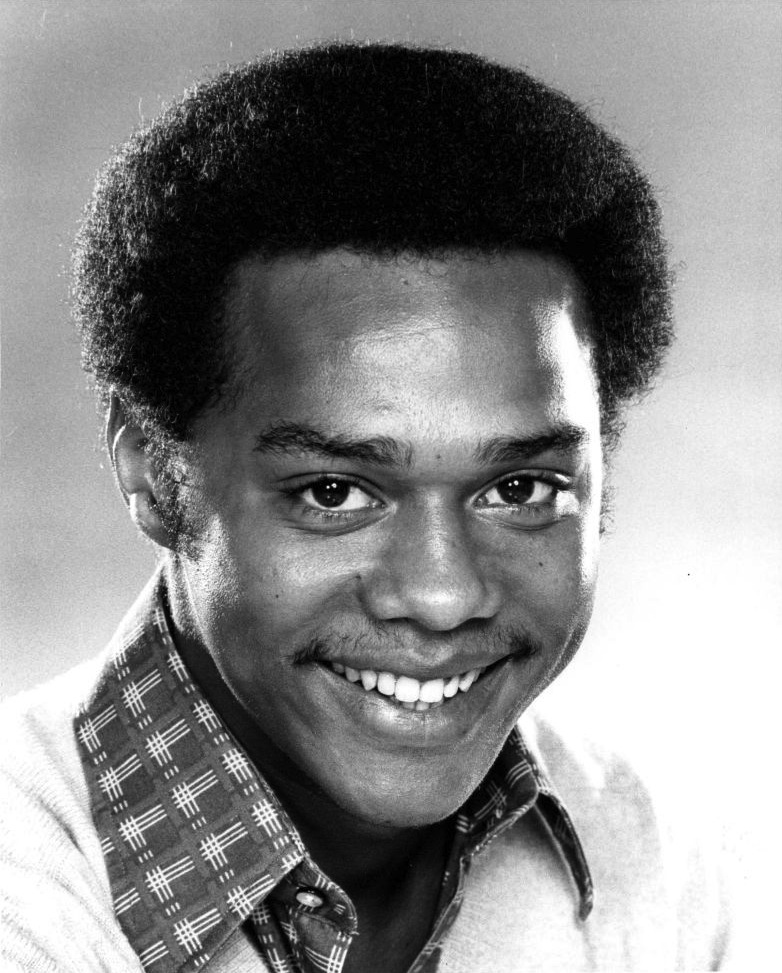
Co-creator Mike Evans (1975)

Good Times was intended to be a family show in the All in the Family vein focused on Rolle and Amos. Both expected the show to deal with serious topics in a comedic way while providing positive characters to which viewers could identify. It was Walker's character of J.J. that was an immediate hit with audiences and became the breakout character of the series. J.J.'s frequent use of the expression "Dy-no-mite!" (often in the phrase "Kid Dy-no-mite!"), credited to director John Rich (first delivered by Walker at the end of the Season 1, Episode 2, "Black Jesus"), became a popular catchphrase (later included in TV Land's The 100 Greatest TV Quotes and Catch Phrases special).

Rich insisted Walker say it in every episode. Walker and executive producer Norman Lear were skeptical of the idea, but the phrase and the J.J. Evans character caught on with the audience. As a result of the character's popularity, the writers focused more on J.J.'s comedic antics instead of serious issues. Throughout seasons two and three, Rolle and Amos grew increasingly disillusioned with the direction of the show and especially with J.J.'s tomfoolery and stereotypically buffoonish behavior. Rolle was vocal about her hate of his character. In a 1975 interview with Ebony magazine she stated:

He's 18 and he doesn't work. He can't read or write. He doesn't think. The show didn't start out to be that...Little by little—with the help of the artist, I suppose, because they couldn't do that to me—they have made J.J. more stupid and enlarged the role. Negative images have been slipped in on us through the character of the oldest child.

Despite doing so less publicly than Rolle, Amos also was outspoken about his dissatisfaction with the J.J. character, stating:

The writers would prefer to put a chicken hat on J.J. and have him prance around saying "DY-NO-MITE", and that way they could waste a few minutes and not have to write meaningful dialogue.

In addition to his criticism of J.J.'s personality, Amos also greatly criticized what he felt was a greater emphasis on J.J. and more disregard for the other two Evans children, telling the Television Academy Foundation in 2014 that:

We had a number of differences. I felt too much emphasis was being put on J.J. in his chicken hat, saying ‘Dy-no-mite!’ every third page. I felt just as much emphasis and mileage could have been gotten out of my other two children, one of whom aspired to become a Supreme Court justice, played by Ralph Carter, and the other, BernNadette Stanis, who aspired to become a surgeon. But I wasn’t the most diplomatic guy in those days, and [the show’s producers] got tired of having their lives threatened over jokes. So they said, ‘Tell you what, why don’t we kill him off? We can get on with our lives!’ That taught me a lesson — I wasn’t as important as I thought I was to the show or to Norman Lear’s plans.

While Amos was less public with his dissatisfaction than Rolle, he was fired after season three due to disagreements with Lear and the writing staff, which, according to Amos, were often confrontational and heated. Amos' departure was initially attributed to his desire to focus on a film career, but he admitted in a 1976 interview that Lear called him and told him that his contract option with the show was not being renewed. Amos stated: "That's the same thing as being fired." The producers decided not to recast the character of James Evans, instead opting to kill off the character in the two-part season four premiere, "The Big Move", with Florida finding out that James died in an automobile accident while in Mississippi setting up a new business opportunity at an auto repair shop, which would have allowed the family to move from the ghetto.

=== Final seasons ===
By the end of season four, Rolle had also become dissatisfied with the show's direction and decided to leave the series. In the two-part season finale, "Love Has a Spot On His Lung", Florida gets engaged to Carl Dixon (Moses Gunn), a man she began dating toward the end of season four. In the season five premiere episode, "The Evans Get Involved Part 1", it is revealed that Florida and Carl married off screen and moved to Arizona for the sake of Carl's health. With Amos and Rolle gone, DuBois took over as lead actor, as Willona checked in on the Evans children since they were now living alone.

In season five, Janet Jackson joined the cast, playing Penny Gordon, an abused girl, abandoned by her mother, and eventually adopted by Willona. During that season, Johnny Brown's character of Nathan Bookman, the Evans' superintendent, became more prominent. At the beginning of the fifth season, Brown became a series regular and was included in the opening credits. Ratings began to decline. It was clear to the producers as well as viewers that Rolle's absence had left the series without a much-needed unifying center of attention.

Before the taping of season six began, CBS and the show's producers decided that they had to do "something drastic" to increase viewership. According to then-vice president of CBS programming Steve Mills: "We had lost the essence of the show. Without parental guidance, the show slipped. Everything told us that: our mail, our phone calls, our research. We felt we had to go back to basics."

Producers approached Rolle with an offer to appear in a guest role on the series. Rolle was initially hesitant, but when producers agreed to a number of her demands (including an increased salary and higher quality scripts), she agreed to return to the series on a full-time basis. Rolle also wanted producers to make the character of J.J. more responsible, as she felt the character was a poor role model for African-American youths. She also requested that producers write out the character of Carl Dixon; Rolle reportedly disliked the storyline surrounding the Carl Dixon character, as she believed Florida would not have moved on so quickly after James's death or left her children. Rolle also thought the writers had disregarded Florida's devout Christian beliefs by having her fall for and marry Carl, who was an atheist.

In the season six premiere episode "Florida's Homecoming: Part 1", Florida returns from Arizona without Carl to attend Thelma's upcoming wedding to professional football player Keith Anderson (Ben Powers, who joined the cast for the final season). In a rare uncut version of "Florida's Homecoming: Part 2", after Florida arrives home from Arizona, Willona briefly pulls her aside and mentions Carl, to which Florida sadly smiles and shakes her head, implying that Carl had died from cancer. Florida later mentions Carl one last time when she tells Michael about a book they'd both bought him.

Despite changes in the series at Rolle's request and her return, plus the addition of Powers to the cast, ratings continued to fall and CBS canceled the series during the 1978–79 season. In the series finale episode "The End of the Rainbow", each character finally gets a "happy ending". J.J. gets his big break as a nationally syndicated artist for a comic book company with his newly created character, DynoWoman, which is based on Thelma (much to her surprise and delight) and is moving into an apartment with some lady friends.

Michael attends college and moves into an on-campus dorm. Keith's bad knee heals due to his exercise and own physical therapy, leading to the Chicago Bears offering him a contract to play football. Keith announces that he and Thelma are moving into a luxury apartment in the city's upscale Gold Coast district. Thelma also announces that she is pregnant with the couple's first child.

Keith offers Florida the chance to move in with them so she can help Thelma with the new baby; Florida accepts the offer. Willona becomes the head buyer of the boutique, she walks in and announces that she and Penny are also moving out of the projects. Willona then reveals that her new apartment is in the same apartment building to which Keith, Thelma and Florida are also moving; she and Penny become the Evanses' downstairs neighbors.

== Broadcast and syndication ==
Cable network TV One aired reruns of the show since its launch on January 19, 2004. Good Times had also aired at various times on TV Land and on the Canadian specialty cable channel DejaView. Minisodes of the show are available for free on Crackle. Additionally, digital multicast network Antenna TV also aired episodes of the show until January 1, 2018, when GetTV, operated by Sony (which distributes the show), began airing the program until it was removed on December 27, 2025. Good Times airs on GetTV with a TV-PG rating.

Most episodes run on TV One with a TV-G rating, with the lone exception being the season three episode "J.J. in Trouble," in which J.J. fears he may have contracted an STD. That episode airs with a TV-14 rating, as well as the "parental guidance is suggested" slide that preceded the episode when it was originally broadcast on CBS. In the past, it aired on TV Land with a TV-PG rating.

From March 27, 2023, to December 26, 2025, episodes aired nightly on the Catchy Comedy (formerly Decades) digital retro TV network.

== British adaptation ==
In 1976, a British adaptation of the show under the name The Fosters aired on ITV from April 9, 1976, until July 9, 1977. It was known for being the first sitcom that was written both for and to have an all black cast and starred a young Lenny Henry and Norman Beaton who would 13 years later go on to gain fame in the 1989 sitcom Desmond's.

== Home media ==
Sony Pictures Home Entertainment released the entire series on DVD in Region 1 between February 2003 and August 2006, with a complete box set following the separate seasons on October 28, 2008. Season 1 was released on DVD in Region 4 on December 27, 2006. On August 27, 2013, it was announced that Mill Creek Entertainment had acquired the rights to various television series from the Sony Pictures library, including Good Times. They have subsequently re-released the first four seasons on DVD. On September 1, 2015, Mill Creek Entertainment re-released Good Times: The Complete Series on DVD in Region 1.

All episodes are available to stream on Peacock and Tubi.

DVD name	Ep #	Release date
The Complete First Season	13	February 4, 2003; January 21, 2014 (re-release)
The Complete Second Season	24	February 3, 2004; January 21, 2014 (re-release)
The Complete Third Season	24	August 10, 2004; May 20, 2014 (re-release)
The Complete Fourth Season	24	February 15, 2005; May 20, 2014 (re-release)
The Complete Fifth Season	24	August 23, 2005
The Complete Sixth and Final Season	24	August 1, 2006
The Complete Series	133	October 28, 2008; September 1, 2015 (re-release)

== Reception ==
=== Ratings ===
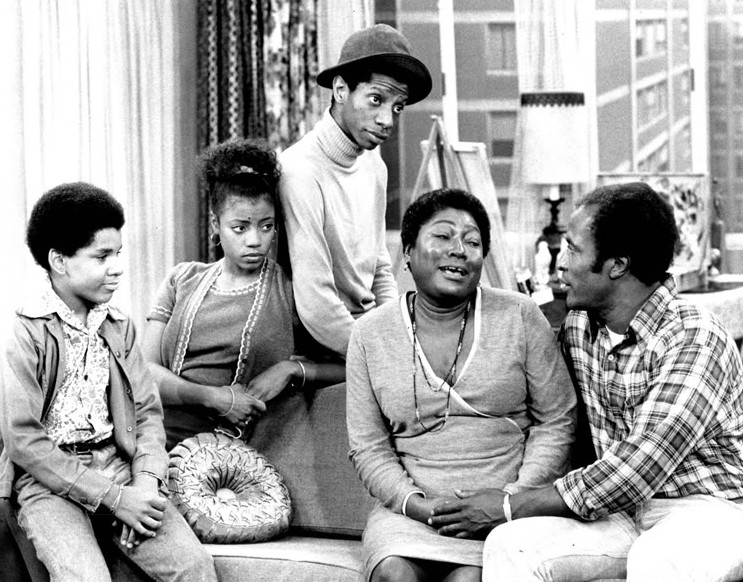
L–R: Ralph Carter, Bern Nadette Stanis, Jimmie Walker, Esther Rolle and John Amos

The program premiered in February 1974; high ratings led CBS to renew the program for the 1974–75 season, as it was the seventeenth-highest-rated program that year. During its first full season on the air, the show was the seventh-highest-rated program in the Nielsen ratings, with more than 25% of all American households tuning into an episode each week. Three of the top ten highest-rated programs on American TV that season centered on the lives of African-Americans: Sanford and Son, The Jeffersons and Good Times. The Nielsen ratings for the series declined over time, partly because of its many time slot changes and the departure of John Amos. The ratings went down considerably when the show entered its final two seasons:

Season	TV Season	No. of Episodes	Time slot (ET)	Nielsen ratings	
Season	TV Season	No. of Episodes	Time slot (ET)	Rank	Rating
1	1973–1974	13	Friday at 8:30 pm	17	21.4 (Tied with Barnaby Jones)
2	1974–1975	24	Tuesday at 8:00 pm	7	25.8
3	1975–1976	24	Tuesday at 8:00 pm	24	21.0
4	1976–1977	24	Wednesday at 8:00 pm (Episodes 1–15, 17–24); Wednesday at 8:30 pm (Episode 16)	26	20.5
5	1977–1978	24	Wednesday at 8:00 pm (Episodes 1, 3–16); Wednesday at 8:30 pm (Episode 2); Monday at 8:00 pm (Episodes 17–24)	55	17.4
6	1978–1979	22	Saturday at 8:00 pm (Episode 1); Saturday at 8:30 pm (Episodes 2–10); Wednesday at 8:30 pm (Episodes 11–22)	91	13.0

=== Awards and nominations ===
Year	Association	Category	Recipient(s)	Result
1974	Golden Globe Awards	Best Supporting Actor – Television	Jimmie Walker	Nominated
1975	Golden Globe Awards	Best TV Actress – Musical/Comedy	Esther Rolle	Nominated
1975	Golden Globe Awards	Best Supporting Actor – Television	Jimmie Walker	Nominated
1975	Humanitas Prize	30 Minute Category	John Baskin and Roger Shulman / episode: "The Lunch Money Ripoff"	Nominated
1975	Humanitas Prize	30 Minute Category	Bob Peete / episode: "My Girl Henrietta"	Nominated
2006	TV Land Awards	Impact Award	John Amos, Ralph Carter, Ja'net DuBois, Esther Rolle (posthumously), BernNadette Stanis, and Jimmie Walker	Won

== Revival ==
In September 2020, it was announced that the series would receive an animated sitcom revival with Carl Jones originally attached as showrunner and Norman Lear originally executive producing alongside Seth MacFarlane and Stephen Curry for Netflix. In December 2023, it was announced Ranada Shepard replaced Carl Jones as showrunner for the series. It centers on the current generation of the Evans family, and stars Jay Pharoah, Marsai Martin, Yvette Nicole Brown, Slink Johnson, and J. B. Smoove. The series (titled on-screen as Good Times: Black Again) was released on April 12, 2024.

It received overwhelmingly negative reviews from critics and audiences with criticism aimed at the animation style, the crass presentation, racist and offensive humor, and general lack of connection to the original series aside from occasional mentions of the James Evans character.
