= The Martin and Lewis Show =

1949-1953 radio comedy-variety program

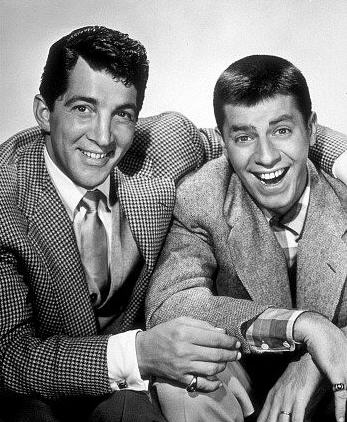
- Dean Martin and Jerry Lewis
- Genre: Comedy-variety
- Running time: 30 minutes
- Country of origin: United States
- Language: English
- Syndicates: NBC
- Starring: Dean Martin; Jerry Lewis
- Announcer: Jimmy Wallington; Johnny Jacobs
- Written by: Ed Simmons (1950-1953); Norman Lear (1950-1953)
- Directed by: Robert L. Redd; Dick Mack
- Produced by: Bob Adams
- Original release: April 3, 1949 – July 14, 1953
- Sponsored by: Chesterfield cigarettes Anacin

The Martin and Lewis Show is a radio comedy-variety program in the United States starring the comedy duo Martin and Lewis, consisting of Dean Martin and Jerry Lewis. It was broadcast on the NBC Radio Network beginning April 3, 1949, and ending July 14, 1953.

== Background ==
After losing The Jack Benny Program and Amos 'n' Andy from its Sunday night lineup to what had been called "the CBS talent raids" of 1948–49, NBC turned to the young comedy team of Dean Martin and Jerry Lewis, a pair "virtually unknown to a radio audience." Reinehr and Swartz commented in their old-time radio reference book, "the program ... was never as successful as the network had hoped, because much of Martin and Lewis's comedy was visual.

Work on the program began early in 1949, after NBC "decided to build a show around Martin and Lewis." Billboard magazine reported that the network spent approximately $400,000 over five months getting the show ready. Preparation was worked around the duo's performances in night clubs and in the movie My Friend Irma. The basis for NBC's investment was a five-year radio contract signed in December 1948. The deal guaranteed the pair $150,000 per year and "a choice time slot." The program was scheduled to begin Jan. 16, 1949, but it did not go on the air until April.

== Negative reviews ==
Reviews of the program's first broadcast indicated that the episode left much room for improvement. A Billboard reviewer wrote, "Off the initial outing, the lads will have to do considerable improving to live up to all the web's hopes." However, he offered some optimism by writing, "[I]f the scripters can come up with material as fresh as their style and talent, Martin and Lewis still may earn all the accolades which were tossed their way before they ever faced a mike." Meanwhile, media critic John Crosby wrote in his newspaper column, "The general attitude was one of friendly skepticism."

In January 1950, Billboard reported that CBS "was making a determined effort to sign, among others, the comedy team of Dean Martin and Jerry Lewis." The story added that at that point the program still had no sponsors and was "costing NBC close to $10,000 per week."

By the end of 1950, Jerry Lewis recruited comedy writers Norman Lear and Ed Simmons to become the regular writers for Martin and Lewis.

== Gains ==
Things eventually improved economically for The Martin and Lewis Show. It went on to have sponsorship from Chesterfield cigarettes and Anacin. It gained popularity with listeners, too, as it was named Favorite Radio Comedy Show in Radio-TV Mirror magazine's 1952 poll. However, at least one newspaper writer still was not favorably impressed by the program. In 1952, Hal Humphrey wrote that The Martin and Lewis Show and Red Skelton's radio program were lacking in comparison to their television counterparts. He commented, "With rare exceptions their jokes and situations were stale and grisly with age, and on radio they had no chance to save themselves with mugging or pratfalls."

== Format ==
Martin was the singer of the pair, and Lewis was the comedian, with the latter described by radio historian John Dunning as a "squeaky-voiced idiot who heckled everybody in sight." Dunning described the program's content as "standard variety fare: an opening song by Martin, some verbal slapstick, a guest spot, more Lewis antics, and a closing number by Martin."

== Personnel ==
Besides Martin and Lewis, regulars on the program included Ben Alexander, Sheldon Leonard, Florence MacMichael, The Skylarks and Mary Hatcher.

Ed Simmons and Norman Lear wrote for the program, just as they also wrote for Martin and Lewis's movies and TV shows. Dick Stabile was both the bandleader and a foil for Martin and Lewis jokes.

== See also ==
- Teaming with Jerry Lewis (describing how the act broke up in 1956)
