= Austin Kalish =

American producer and screenwriter

- Born: Austin Roy Kalish; February 3, 1921; The Bronx, New York, U.S.
- Died: October 5, 2016 (aged 95); Woodland Hills, California, U.S.
- Education: New York University
- Occupations: Producer, screenwriter
- Spouse: Irma Kalish (m. 1948)
- Children: 2; including Bruce Kalish

Austin Roy Kalish (February 3, 1921 – October 5, 2016) was an American producer and screenwriter.

== Life and career ==
Kalish was born in The Bronx, New York, the son of Helen (née Rosenfeld, 1894–1994) and Milton Kalish (1892–1958), a salesman. He attended New York University, and he later served in World War II. After World War II ended, Kalish began writing jokes for comedians.

Kalish began his career writing for The Martin and Lewis Show, with his wife, Irma. They later collaborated on producing and writing for television programs, including Too Close for Comfort, All in the Family, The Bob Newhart Show, Good Times, My Favorite Martian, Maude, I Dream of Jeannie, F Troop, and Family Affair.

== Personal life ==
Kalish was married to Irma Kalish from 1948, They had a son, comedy writer Bruce Kalish, and a daughter Nancy Biederman, who died in 2016 of leukemia.

== Death ==
Kalish died in October 2016 at the Motion Picture & Television Fund cottages in Woodland Hills, California, at the age of 95.
