= La Isla Vertical =

2022 novel by Miguel Coyula

La isla vertical
- Author: Miguel Coyula
- Language: Spanish
- Genre: Dystopian fiction Science fiction
- Publisher: Ediciones Deslinde
- Publication date: 2022
- Publication place: Spain
- Pages: 158
- ISBN: 978-84-19369-08-6

La isla vertical is a novel by Cuban author and filmmaker Miguel Coyula, written between 2005 and 2021, and published in 2022 by Ediciones Deslinde in Madrid.

== Plot ==
Following an apparent climate disaster, half of a skyscraper and its residents become stranded in the middle of the ocean. Marcos is a neurotic young man who is torn between escaping and remaining in the same building, which is also inhabited by Malva, a young mutant who becomes the object of his erotic obsession, and her sister Malu.

== Narrative style and themes ==
The novel uses a fragmented and polyphonic structure, moving between different temporal levels, narrative perspectives, and textual genres, with an emotionally detached omniscient narrator. Ángel Pérez has described its construction as a collage of discourses and voices and emphasized the way in which the abrupt combination of letters, diaries, dreams, and other forms disrupts conventional narrative expectations.

Coyula has stated that he deliberately sought to complicate the novel's relatively simple underlying story by adding multiple narrative layers. He has also described his increasing impatience with linear narrative structures and his preference for allowing concepts to emerge from intuitive writing and from the eventual structure of the work.

The novel has been discussed in relation to dystopian fiction, existentialism, nihilism, and speculative literature. Its treatment of isolation, obsession, physical transformation, dysfunctional family relationships, and the search for freedom has also been connected to recurring concerns in Coyula’s earlier novel, Mar rojo, Mal azul as well as his films Red Cockroaches and Blue Heart.

Scholar Nelly Rajaonarivelo also identifies the building depicted in Blue Heart as the titular location in La isla vertical, linking the film and novel within Coyula's recurring fictional universe. Coyula stated that he began writing more than half of the novel in English in 2005, before beginning production on Memories of Overdevelopment. He returned to the manuscript after completing Blue Heart in 2021. He described the novel as taking place after the events of Mar rojo, Mal Azul. He has cited the 1981 Japanese anime film Space Warrior Baldios, Fyodor Dostoevsky's Notes from Underground, Silent Hill, and Waterworld as influences. Scholar Omar Corral Gamboa has also examined connections to the existentialism of Albert Camus and Edmundo Desnoes.

== Critical reception ==
Essayist Luis Álvarez described the novel's "austere and deliberate sobriety", emphasizing its introspective nature as well as its departure from a narrative centered on the merely referential or descriptive. He concluded that "Coyula contributes an artistic text of philosophical reach, where obsession becomes a dazzling thematic force." In an essay published by Egregius Ediciones, Omar Corral Gamboa examined the narrative structure of La isla vertical, focusing on its complex polyphonic organization and abrupt alternation between narrative voices as formal features of the novel. He also discusses the narrator's self-deprecating consciousness, noting that the grotesque reinforces the irony "surrounding the characters' efforts to find beauty and virtue in an environment where it is neither possible, nor can affective or vital needs ever be fully satisfied."

In a review published in Hypermedia Magazine, Luis Roberto Gómez Alarcón discussed the work from a sensorial perspective, emphasizing its depiction of what he described as an "enjoyable agony" linked to a "dark eroticism". In Rialta magazine, critic Ángel Pérez described the novel as a form of existential speculation, emphasizing its structure as a collage of discourses and voices that articulates different levels of reality within the narrative. Pérez wrote that "what surprises, more than the anecdote, is the continuous breaking of the system of expectations." At La Hora de Cuba, Pérez described La isla vertical as having an "experimental" nature and an "existentialist thrust", relating its literary techniques to Coyula's filmmaking and describing it as a work with its own literary "technology". Another essay by Corral likewise emphasized the novel's formal construction, describing its organization in terms of the "meticulous hierarchy, gradation and distribution of both space and language".

== Controversy ==
During the novel's 2022 presentation in Madrid, artist and presenter Lester Álvarez Meno objected to four pages that he interpreted as references to Cuban opposition figures Luis Manuel Otero Alcántara and other Cuban artist-activists, including Tania Bruguera. During a later presentation in Havana, Ángel Pérez disputed Álvarez's interpretation, referring to Coyula's technique of adapting real-life references in a manner comparable to the Cuban literary tradition of Guillermo Cabrera Infante, Reinaldo Arenas, and Heberto Padilla. The Madrid presentation and subsequent controversy surrounding La isla vertical were incorporated into the documentary Chronicles of the Absurd.

In a review, critic Dean Luis Reyes described Álvarez's reading of the novel as “explicitly literal”. Reyes interpreted the dispute as reflecting lingering forms of cultural censorship and suspicion in Cuban intellectual life abroad, writing that the episode “best refracts the aftermath of the tensions between culture and power in Cuba.” In Reverse Shot, critic Andrew Truong interpreted the discussion as part of a broader confrontation with the Cuban exile cultural environment. Truong wrote that "Coyula picks a fight with his ostensible allies, casting the rebel intelligentsia as yet another institution to rail against." Coyula subsequently addressed the incident in two essays published in Jump Cut and Cineaste.

== See also ==
- Literature of Cuba
- Apocalyptic fiction
- Science fiction
