= Nobody (2017 film) =

- Directed by: Miguel Coyula
- Written by: Miguel Coyula
- Produced by: Miguel Coyula, Lynn Cruz
- Starring: Rafael Alcides, Lynn Cruz, Fidel Castro
- Narrated by: Rafael Alcides, Lynn Cruz
- Cinematography: Miguel Coyula
- Edited by: Miguel Coyula
- Music by: Iván Lejardi, Sinfonity
- Production company: Producciones Pirámide
- Distributed by: Habanero Film Sales
- Release date: 2017
- Running time: 70 minutes
- Country: Cuba
- Languages: Spanish, English

Nobody (Spanish: Nadie) is a 2017 Cuban independent documentary film directed by Miguel Coyula and starring poet Rafael Alcides. It premiered at the Dominican Republic Global Film Festival, where it won the award for Best Documentary. It was subsequently screened at the Málaga Film Festival, the Biarritz Film Festival, and the Museum of Modern Art (MoMA).

== Synopsis ==
In 2015, nearly blind, poet Rafael Alcides decides to recover and transcribe his unpublished literary work after discovering that the home-made ink from his typewritten manuscripts has almost faded. Through this process, fragments of his personal memories and his complicated relationship with Cuba's political history emerge in a nonlinear narrative.

== Production ==
Miguel Coyula began the project while working on his feature film Blue Heart. Following an accident that kept him at home for several months, he conducted a series of interviews with poet Rafael Alcides. The resulting material, consisting of approximately 40 hours of interviews, was subsequently edited and structured into a feature film through a digital editing process incorporating archival footage, animation, and paintings by Antonia Eiriz.

The film was initially conceived as a seven-episode web series. According to press reports, Cuban cultural authorities questioned the use of certain musical materials in one of the episodes, arguing that they had not been authorized for use in critical or controversial content.

According to the director, the intention was to keep Alcides on screen for most of the film, constructing his memories and recollections through post-production, with the footage shot against a black background and later edited. At various points, Alcides addresses the camera directly and explicitly refers to Fidel Castro in his remarks.

Following Fidel Castro's death in 2016, Coyula filmed images of his funeral, which were subsequently incorporated into both Nobody and Blue Heart.

== Critical reception ==
Matthew David Roe, in a review published by ScreenAnarchy, highlighted the film's auteur-driven style, characterized by digital image manipulation, superimpositions, and appropriated footage and sound. He noted how these techniques construct a fragmented portrait of memory, politics, and subjective experience in contemporary Cuba. Roe observed that "Every step of the story propelled by Alcides’ words is simultaneously injected with Coyula's emotions and ideas, impressing that we are accompanying them equally through this story." He concluded that "Nadie is an irrevocable achievement in documentary filmmaking and should be seen as a benchmark from which the industry should emulate and evolve."

In De Groene Amsterdammer, Raymond van den Boogaard situated Nobody within a broader reflection on contemporary Cuba as a "museum of world socialism", emphasizing the erosion of the country's ideological imaginary and its continuing condition as a post-revolutionary space. He expressed some reservations, writing that the film “is rather romanticizing in its approach—the relevance of excerpts from Citizen Kane and Metropolis to the subject is not entirely clear. Nevertheless, it is moving”.

In a review published in Caimán Cuadernos de Cine, Enric Albero praised the way Alcides' "agile and brilliant words engage in a dialogue with the images," transforming the film into "an artifact that, through its honesty, questions the ultimate form adopted by the Revolution."

Conversely, Cuban essayist Néstor Díaz de Villegas described Alcides's testimony as "contradictory and inconsistent" and dismissed the film's message as "disposable". He nevertheless identified a different significance in Coyula's appropriation of agitprop techniques as an act of subversion, comparing the film to a "newsreel that brings bad news".

At Cuba Encuentro, Roberto Madrigal described the film as “Godardian in spirit”, adding that "At times, it seems to sink into a prefabricated rhythm, but it immediately recovers and bursts into life through the character’s loquacity and Coyula’s excellent editing. The film is a feast for those who, like Orson Welles, believe that what matters most is what remains on the cutting-room floor"

Journalist Leandro Estupiñán, writing for OnCuba News, described Alcides as "neither a martyr nor a victim", although he suggested that he might have been both. He portrayed him as a passionate man who speaks about the wounds caused by that passion.

In another review published in La Opinión de Málaga, Francis Mármol described the documentary as "a remarkable exercise in poetry”, highlighting its critical perspective on contemporary Cuban cinema and its circulation through alternative venues.

In an unfinished essay published posthumously by Rialta, critic Ileana Margarita Rodríguez analyzed the film's narrative aesthetic and its use of paintings by Antonia Eiriz, observing that "The film's continuous flirtation with fiction positions us as participating spectators in a man's confessions and life story, but also confronts us with a complex, postmodern audiovisual work that uses photomontage, animation and collage to construct a political document engaging with structures of power and the ongoing dissatisfaction of both the protagonist and the filmmaker."

In a review published in El Mundo, Ismael Marinero wrote that "some of the film's finest moments emerge from this profound sense of disappointment."

During a presentation of the film in Paris in 2023, film critic and historian Paulo Antônio Paranaguá emphasized its engagement with earlier generations and its efforts to preserve historical memory and incorporate it into contemporary thought, describing this as "something that makes the film moving, but also takes it further".

== Screenings and censorship ==
Following the documentary's award at the Dominican Republic Global Film Festival, its filmmakers attempted to organize a screening at the private gallery El Círculo. The event was cancelled after a raid by police and State Security agents. The incident was subsequently documented in Coyula's film Chronicles of the Absurd (2024).

OnCuba News reported that a screening of Nobody scheduled to take place at the Ministry of Foreign Affairs in Argentina was cancelled shortly before the event and relocated to another cultural venue in Buenos Aires.

At the Mar del Plata International Film Festival, the film was initially selected, but festival programmers subsequently ceased communication without providing further explanation.

In Cuba, the documentary could only be screened at alternative venues and as part of the Cine Independiente–Cine Pendiente showcase at the Hannah Arendt International Institute of Artivism. In Miami, it was screened in 2018 as part of the Fruta prohibida showcase, organized by Nat Chediak at the Coral Gables Art Cinema. In 2019, Nobody was included in the contemporary cinema program of the Ringling Museum in Sarasota, Florida, as part of a special screening dedicated to independent Latin American cinema.

During the 2020 interrogation of artist Javier Caso, security agents reportedly stated that Nobody would not be permitted in Cuba because it was a documentary "that speaks very badly of Fidel Castro".

In 2022, Nobody was included in the program of documenta 15 in Kassel, Germany, through lumbung Film, a collective archive of audiovisual works screened at Gloria-Kino.

== Awards ==
- 2017 – Best Documentary, Dominican Republic Global Film Festival.
- 2019 – Best Experimental Film, Arraial Cine Fest.
