= New England Festival of Ibero American Cinema =

Film festival held in New England, USA

- Location: Providence, Rhode Island; New Haven, Connecticut, United States
- Language: International
- Website: http://nefiac.com/

The New England Festival of Ibero American Cinema is a film festival that takes place annually in the cities of Providence, Rhode Island, and New Haven, Connecticut, in the United States. It is the largest Latin American cinema festival in the region of New England. Held in early fall in Providence and New Haven, the festival aims to become the premier showcase for new works from Latin American and Ibero American filmmakers. The festival comprises competitive sections for feature films, documentaries and short films. A group of non-competitive showcase sections, including Desde Cuba: New Cinema and Panorama are also an important part of the festival. Panels, Art Exhibits and Discussions are the focus of the festival which every year invites and hosts Spanish and Latin American filmmakers to interact with Providence and New England audiences.

== History ==
=== Providence/Latin American Film Festival ===
NEFIAC began in Providence in September 2010 as a Latin American and Ibero American film festival in an effort to attract Latin American, Spanish and Portuguese filmmakers to Providence and to the New England region at large. In addition, it has the purpose of exposing the local community to different cultures and facilitating understanding and communication among residents with different ethnic backgrounds. The effort was especially felt to be of significant relevance since a large number of the residents of Providence and New Haven identify themselves as Latinos. The 2010 festival featured films such as Undertow (Peru), Memories of Overdevelopment (Cuba), The Last Summer of the Boyita (Argentina), and Celda 211 (Spain).

The goal of the festival is to showcase strictly Latin American, Spanish and Portuguese-made films. The main focus of the event is to conduct a competition for the first time directors of these films, present a series of filmmaker panel discussions, address socioeconomic issues of importance to Latin America, promote the interaction of young international filmmakers with Latino students and all the residents of Providence and New England and to celebrate the Jury Awards. The Festival highlights the work of "Latin American" filmmakers who produced their films in their country of origin and are interested on sharing their experience with New England audiences. Without the New England Festival of Ibero American Cinema, most of these films would not have the opportunity to be shown in Providence and in New England. NEFIAC's Emerging Filmmakers Award Competition requires for all films to be no older than 18 months and they must also be New England Premieres.

The jury of the 2010 festival was headed by Professor Ann Marie Stock (The College of William and Mary), and included filmmakers Javier Espada (Spain) and Ishtar Yaseen (Costa Rica). The festival has a strong support from some of the most important universities in the world, including Brown University, Yale University and Dartmouth College. In addition, a number of Ibero and Latin American filmmakers visited the festival, including Julia Solomonoff (Argentina), Javier Fuentes León (Perú), Cecilia Domeyko (Chile), Miguel Gomes (Portugal), Pedro Ruiz (Venezuela), Ishtar Yaseen Gutierrez (Costa Rica), Ian Padrón (Cuba), Rafi Mercado (Puerto Rico), Miguel Coyula (Cuba) and Carlos Marques Marcet (Spain). Most recently, NEFIAC hosted prominent Cuban novelist Edmundo Desnoes who is worldly known for his novel Memories of Underdevelopment immortalized by Cuban director Gutiérrez Alea in 1966.

A unique feature of this Ibero and Latin American Film Festival is the program Desde Cuba: New Cinema. The segment showcases the works of award-winning young independent Cuban filmmakers and exclusively presents World Premieres. Every year, several Cuban filmmakers attend the festival and participate in seminars and panel discussions. The segment was initially presented in 2008 and it is now on its Fifth Edition. No other film festival in the United States presents such a program.

In addition, NEFIAC sponsors every year other events related to the visual arts including art exhibits, and co-sponsors the presentation of Latin American films at different venues. Recent presentations have included Latinbeat (Lincoln Center of New York), Cleveland Cinematheque, the Miami International Film Festival and the Gasparilla International Film Festival in Tampa.

=== Notability of festivals ===
Many famous filmmakers receive their big break at international film festivals. In 2010 NEFIAC presented the New England Premieres of three films that went on to become their original countries official entry to the Oscars in the Foreign Film Category, including Contracorriente Undertow (Peru) and Miente (Puerto Rico).

=== Awards ===
Every year, a jury of internationally recognized academicians, filmmakers, critics and/or actors and actresses hand out awards for categories such as "Best Emerging Filmmaker" in the genres of feature film, documentary and short film. The major prize, the Best Emerging Filmmaker Award, is given to a feature-length director who is presenting an Opera Prima. The following list shows past winners:

- 2014 "Franco's Settlers" Best Documentary, Directors Lucia Palacios & Dietmar Post
- 2011 "The Water at the End of the World" (2011) Best Emerging Filmmaker Award, Director Paula Siero, Argentina
- 2011 "Ivan's Woman" (2011) Special Mention, Director Francisca Silva, Chile
- 2011 "Long Distance" (2011) Special Mention, Director Esteban Insausti, Cuba
- 2010 "The Last Summer of the Boyita" (2010) Best Emerging Filmmaker Award, Director Julia Solomonoff, Argentina
- 2010 "Undertow" (2010) Special Mention, Director Javier Fuentes Leon, Peru
