= Mar rojo, Mal azul =

Apocalyptic science fiction novel by Miguel Coyula

Mar rojo, mal azul
- Author: Miguel Coyula
- Language: Spanish
- Genre: Science fiction, dystopian novel
- Publisher: La Pereza Ediciones
- Publication date: 2013
- Publication place: United States, Spain
- Pages: 190
- ISBN: 9780615879253

Mar rojo, Mal azul is an apocalyptic science fiction novel by Cuban author and filmmaker Miguel Coyula. The novel was written in 1999 and first published in 2013 by La Pereza Ediciones. It shares a fictional universe with La Isla Vertical as well as with the films Red Cockroaches and Blue Heart.

== Plot ==
Ivan Kovelt is a student with a promising career and a seemingly stable relationship with his girlfriend Azucena. When he meets a mysterious young woman named Marina, his life begins a downward spiral of obsession, paranoia and past traumas, paralleling the world's environmental decay and technological collapse.

== Narrative style ==
The novel features several cinematic techniques adapted to a literary format. These include shifts in focus and point of view, as well as abrupt thematic transitions. In Jump Cut, Miguel Coyula stated "Almost the entire narrative is constructed from my friends' experiences and extrapolated into a science fiction universe with fabricated situations, while keeping intact their psychologies and speaking style", adding that the narrative descriptions were written "under the precept that each sentence is the equivalent to a cinematographic shot".

== Reception ==
The novel's hybrid relationship between cinema and literature has been highlighted as its most distinctive formal characteristic. In Rialta, Carlos Velazco wrote that "Coyula's unusual originality has attained the dimension of literature." Writer Carlos Gámez reviewed it in Nagari and expressed reservations about the novel's opening and ending, while describing Coyula as "a solid writer who explores the psyche of his characters to the extreme". Critic Ángel Pérez wrote that "The protagonist of Mar rojo, Mal azul lives, like the protagonist of La isla Vertical, trapped between two women of opposing, irreconcilable personalities." Pérez drew parallels with David Lynch "who in his films distinguishes between a material reality and a dreamlike one that merge into one another".

In an essay published in Hypermedia Magazine, essayist Omar Corral interprets the novel as "a discontinuous, mediated, and polyphonic" account of the disruption of Iván Kovelt's life. Corral states that "the fragile equilibrium of a world ravaged by acid rain, natural aberrations—whether deliberate or accidental—and a hedonistic indifference to the future, ultimately gives way." He also linked it to "the unforeseen and perverse universe to which both Blue Heart, Red Cockroaches and La isla vertical belong. The second novel takes place in something resembling what would have remained after the catastrophe of the previous one." Jamila Medina Ríos wrote about "the persistence of certain fundamental imagery and motifs" throughout Coyula's work, describing the book as "crucial to understanding the filmmaker's artistic vision in his early twenties."

== Publication history ==
The novel was published by "La Pereza Ediciones" in the United States in 2013. Ediciones Hurón Azul published a new edition in 2024 presented in Madrid at Casa de Velázquez.
