= Memories of Overdevelopment =

2010 Cuban drama film

- Memorias del desarrollo
- Directed by: Miguel Coyula
- Written by: Miguel Coyula
- Based on: Memorias del desarrollo by Edmundo Desnoes
- Produced by: David W. Leitner
- Starring: Ron Blair; Eileen Alana; Susana Pérez; Lester Martínez
- Cinematography: Miguel Coyula
- Edited by: Miguel Coyula
- Music by: Dika Durbuzovic; Hayes Greenfield; Miguel Coyula
- Production companies: Producciones Pirámide, Habanero Film Sales
- Release date: January 22, 2010 (Sundance Film Festival)
- Running time: 112 minutes
- Countries: Cuba; United States
- Languages: Spanish; English; French; Japanese

Memories of Overdevelopment (Spanish: Memorias del Desarrollo) is a 2010 Cuban film. Written and directed by Miguel Coyula, it is based on a novel by Edmundo Desnoes, also the author of 1968’s Memories of Underdevelopment. It is an independent Cuba–United States co-production, with narrative scenes filmed in both countries. After its world premiere at the 2010 Sundance Film Festival, it garnered several awards and honors. The International Film Guide described it as "one of the best films Cuba has produced".

== Plot ==
Sergio Garcet is an intellectual who abandons the Cuban Revolution and 'underdevelopment' behind only to find himself at odds with the ambiguities of his new life in the 'developed' world.

Highly episodical, the film consists of flashbacks, daydreams, and hallucinations comprising live-action, animation, and newsreel footage assembled to suggest the way personal memory works, subjectively and emotionally.

== Production ==
Production of Memorias del desarrollo began in 2005 and was completed in 2010, with filming taking place in five countries. According to director Miguel Coyula, his first draft of the screenplay was a faithful adaptation of Edmundo Desnoes's novel. As he began filming and editing simultaneously, however, he became aware of new possibilities that would radically alter the narrative structure of the original novel as well as its characters. The film did not follow the traditional chronology of writing, shooting, and editing. This required a new approach in which pre-production, production, and post-production no longer existed as distinct elements, but rather as an integrated and interactive process. This new way of working was not intended as a shortcut, but as a means of revealing new narrative layers of the film.

According to an interview with Coyula published by CINERRATICA, he took advantage of elements around him that he believed could contribute to the film, heavily manipulating images digitally in the process of creating its highly fragmented final narrative. For example, the film incorporates 9/11 footage that Coyula had recorded years earlier, while scenes set in Paris, London, and Tokyo were shot while he was traveling to film festivals where he had been invited to present his film Red Cockroaches. Most of the location shoots were conducted without permits, with the help of friends and a minimal crew consisting primarily of Coyula, producer David W. Leitner, and lead actor Ron Blair, allowing the production to adapt at short notice without the constraints of a rigid schedule. The film's most decisive work, however, took place in the editing room. In presentations about the film's visual effects, Coyula stated that he manipulated the film's imagery extensively, using techniques including green-screen effects, compositing to recreate sets, double exposures, replacing backgrounds, and altering lighting and weather conditions. These techniques also allowed actors filmed in different countries to appear together on screen.

Producer David Leitner initially hoped to raise 2 million dollars for the project. But after realizing there was no interest from film production companies neither in North or South America, they reverted to a strategy closer to Coyula's first feature, Red Cockroaches. The film was funded by executive producers Steve Pieczenik, and Suzana Dejkanovic, associate producers Juan Martinez, and Michael Ferris Gibson as well as the Guggenheim Fellowship Coyula was awarded in 2009 for this project. While working on a low budget delayed completion by five years, it also allowed Coyula to have creative control of the film.

== Reception ==
The film received critical attention for its formal experimentation, narrative ambition, and exploration of exile, memory, and identity. At the film's premiere at the Sundance Film Festival, programmer Shari Frilot described it in Filmmaker Magazine as “one of those films that was simply born from the head of Zeus, like fully formed.”

An initial negative review by Robert Koehler of Variety called it “an unfortunate follow-up to Tomas Gutierrez Alea’s masterpiece.” Subsequently James Greenberg from The Hollywood Reporter considered it “thoughtful and cinematically bold” and "an affecting portrait of modern man becoming more and more isolated from a world he helped to create.” Bérénice Reynaud, writing for ''Senses of Cinema'', compared the film with ''Memories of Underdevelopment'' and wrote that “Coyula raises the stakes through an over-composition of the image and a saturation of colors, creating a complex kaleidoscope that, in turn, determines the editing of the sequences in a kinetic and non-linear manner.” She also observed that “the structure blurs the boundaries between real events, false memories, projections, irritation with American popular culture, political anger, digressions and resentments.” According to Reynaud, these visual strategies further “destabilize” the protagonist, creating “a palpable tension between the film and Desnoes's text.” Film historian Michael Chanan described the film as “a dazzling and disconcerting work of great bravado.” He also noted that, although at times the film appeared “overwhelmed by its own excess,” it represented “a paradigm for a new digital cinema that owes nothing to any orthodoxy.” Robin Menken, writing for ''Cinema Without Borders'', described the film as one that "weaves past and present, personal and historical events in a cascade of images that cut to the heart of modern alienation."

Writing in Juventud Rebelde, Joel del Río argued that “Coyula has managed to build a solid bridge between rampant postmodernity—in its most nostalgic, disenchanted, fragmented forms—and classical Cuban cinema, with its brilliant tradition of combining documentary and fiction.” Orlando Luis Pardo Lazo in Diario de Cuba, described the film as “A memorable moment in the Cuban Arts”. In contrast, Cuban critic Rolando Pérez Betancourt, writing in Granma’', acknowledged the film's formal ambition but expressed reservations about the protagonist's perspective on the Cuban Revolution, observing that “when analyzing Che, he also does it with a simplification disseminated by a certain kind of propaganda: the guerrilla struggle was a failure and the hero ended up becoming a commodity on T-shirts. But that is the new Sergio, and that is this film, well conceived in its formal presentation, which I by no means see as having a propagandistic intention, but rather as an attempt to problematize ideas and conflicts through art, and not only those concerning Cuba.” Writing in the journal Surco Sur, critic Dean Luis Reyes argued that the film’s protagonist “assumes his definitive schizoid position, his dissociation from reality.” Reyes wrote that Sergio “wants something authentic, something that will last, that is not marked by a contextual call. His anguish is that of the individual who seeks to be more than a person or a subject.”

In a retrospective assessment published in 2024, Cuban essayist Luis Álvarez Álvarez wrote that the film embraces what he regarded as the most personal, frank, and direct language in the history of Cuban cinema.

== Lists and selections ==
- Best Cuban Film of 2010 by the International Film Guide.
- Best Film of 2010 by Robin Menken at Cinema Without Borders
- In 2016, La Habana.com included it among its 10 “must-see Cuban films.”

== Awards ==
- Audience Award for Best Foreign Feature Film, Arraial CineFest, Brazil, 2012
- Best Narrative Feature, Extreme World Cinema Festival San Sebastián de Veracruz, Mexico, 2012
- Best Director, Latin American Territory, Málaga Film Festival, Spain, 2011
- Cine Latino Award, Washington DC Independent Film Festival, USA, 2011
- Special Jury Award, Encuentro Nacional de Video, Cuba, 2011
- Special Jury Award, El Almacén de la Imagen, Cuba, 2011
- FIPRESCI Award, Caracol Awards, Cuba, 2011
- Mention, Caracol Awards, Cuba, 2011
- UNEAC Award, Encuentro Nacional de Video, Cuba, 2011
- Best Film, Muestra Joven ICAIC, Cuba, 2011
- Best Original Music, Muestra Joven ICAIC, Cuba, 2011
- FIPRESCI Award, Muestra Joven ICAIC, Cuba, 2011
- SIGNIS Award, Muestra Joven ICAIC, Cuba, 2011
- Editora Musical Award, Muestra Joven ICAIC, Cuba, 2011
- Special Distinction, Latin ACE Awards, USA, 2011
- Most Innovative, Cero Latitud Film Festival, Ecuador, 2010
- Best Narrative Feature, Dallas Video Fest, USA, 2010
- Best Feature, New Media Film Festival, USA, 2010
- Special Mention, Cine Las Americas International Film Festival, USA, 2010
- Best Film, Havana Film Festival New York, USA, 2010

== See also ==
- Cinema of Cuba
- List of films shot over three or more years

== Bibliography ==
- Venegas, Cristina (2010). Digital Dilemmas: The State, the Individual, and Digital Media in Cuba. New Brunswick, New Jersey: Rutgers University Press. ISBN 978-0-8135-4686-5.
- Gawrycki, Marcin Florian (2013). Między sztuką a polityką: kino i kubańska rewolucja [Between Art and Politics: Cinema and the Cuban Revolution]. Toruń: Wydawnictwo Adam Marszałek. ISBN 978-83-7780-662-3.
- Kabous, Magali (2013). "Mémoires du sous-développement & Mémoires du développement : radiographies de la politique cubaine." Cinémas d'Amérique latine, no. 21, pp. 80–94.
- Stone, Rob (2017). "Cubist Cuba: Memorias del desarrollo (Memories of Overdevelopment, 2010)." In Guy Baron, Ann Marie Stock, and Antonio Álvarez Pitaluga (eds.), The Cinema of Cuba: Contemporary Film and the Legacy of Revolution. London: I.B. Tauris, pp. 105–132. ISBN 978-1-78453-814-9.
- Roe, Matthew David (2021). "Miguel Coyula Aquino: Revolutionary Witness." Cineaste, 46 (3): 16–21.
