= The Silly Age =

2006 film

The Silly Age (Spanish: La Edad de la peseta) is a 2006 Cuban film directed by Pavel Giroud. It was Cuba's submission to the 80th Academy Awards for the Academy Award for Best Foreign Language Film, but was not accepted as a nominee.

This film has been nominated to the Goya Awards as a Best Spanish Language Foreign Film, and has won 5 awards in three different film festivals around the world: a Golden India Catalina for Best Film in the Cartagena Film Festival; Best Art Direction, Best Director and Best Original Score winning the Feature Film Trophy in the Cine Ceará - National Cinema Festival; and the Audience Award (Elcine Second Prize) in the Lima Latinamerican Film Festival.

== Critical reception ==
The film received a mixed critical response. Joel del Río of Juventud Rebelde praised the film as an intimate, restrained and sober portrait of a period, describing it as a sometimes "Proustian" recovery of lost time. He also praised Giroud's direction of child actor Iván Carreira and highlighted the performances of Mercedes Sampietro, and José Ángel Egido. Dennis Harvey of Variety characterized the film as an "enchanting coming-of-age film". The film also received international recognition, winning the Nueva Vision Award for Best Spanish-Language Film at the 2008 Santa Barbara International Film Festival. Other critics were less favorable. Javier Ocaña of El País argued that the film never found an appropriate tone for its story, criticizing the slow pace of its dialogue and editing and finding its elements of black comedy ineffective. He also considered the political background insufficiently integrated into the story until the final portion of the film. Néstor Díaz de Villegas, writing for Cubaencuentro, described the film as an unusually interiorized vision of Republican-era Cuba, while examining its treatment of the country's political and social environment. Giroud himself later expressed reservations about the film, calling it his most awkward work despite acknowledging that its atmosphere and child-centered story continued to appeal to many viewers.

== See also ==
- Cinema of Cuba
- List of submissions to the 80th Academy Awards for Best Foreign Language Film
