= Chronicles of the Absurd =

- Directed by: Miguel Coyula
- Written by: Miguel Coyula
- Produced by: Miguel Coyula, Lynn Cruz
- Starring: Lynn Cruz; Miguel Coyula; Tania Bruguera; Fernando Pérez (director); Javier Caso; Lester Álvarez; Ramón Samada
- Music by: Sentimental Idiots (Сентиментальные Идиоты), Porno para Ricardo, Jonathan Formell
- Distributed by: Habanero Film Sales
- Release date: 18 November 2024
- Running time: 77 minutes
- Country: Cuba
- Languages: Spanish, Russian

Chronicles of the Absurd (Spanish: Crónicas del absurdo) is a 2024 Cuban documentary film directed by Miguel Coyula. It premiered at the International Documentary Film Festival Amsterdam (IDFA), where it won the Best Film award in the Envision Competition. IDFA artistic director Orwa Nyrabia described it as a "genre-defying" film.

== Plot ==
When independent filmmaker Miguel Coyula cast actor Lynn Cruz in his dystopian feature Blue Heart in 2011, it marked the beginning of a professional as well as a romantic relationship. Through a series of encounters with Cuban cultural institutions, government officials, and other individuals, Coyula and Cruz document the forms of institutional control, censorship, and intimidation they experience as independent artists. The film also examines encounters with critics of the Cuban government outside the country, exploring how ideological positions can lead to similar forms of intolerance. Constructed primarily from clandestine audio recordings, transcripts, photographs, and animated paintings by Antonia Eiriz, the documentary traces their experiences across more than a decade.

== Style ==
Rather than relying primarily on conventional documentary live-action footage, Coyula employs visual montages and animated sequences incorporating transcripts. In Design Observer, Susan Morris examined the film's graphic approach, noting the use of grid compositions inspired by late 1980s and early 1990s role-playing video games, as well as Antonia Eiriz’s grotesque figures to represent officials conducting interrogations. Diego Batlle, writing for Otros Cines, describes the film's visual construction as a collage in keeping with contemporary social networks, memes, emojis, GIFs and short videos. He noted that Coyula reconfigures these elements within the film to give them "a disturbing dimension”. Cuban critic Dean Luis Reyes, writing for Rialta discussed the film’s modular structure, stating that it “also operates as autoethnography”.

== Reception ==
Dutch newspaper Het Parool called it as "a Kafkaesque Masterpiece". n Los Experimentos, Pablo Gamba described the film as "a documentary about the commitment and courage of sincere friendship, love and solidarity." Nicolas Rapold at Documentary Magazine's Nicolas Rapold called it "a fascinating dispatch that freely tests audiovisual bounds of documentary"

In his review at J.B Spins, Joe Bendel observed that the film "would be quite amusing in a farcical and aptly absurd way, if it were also not so Orwellian". He added that "They use cleverly monstrous looking stand-in icons and slyly selected photos for bureaucrats with an online footprint, creating dramatic montages. Despite the scarcity of actual video, Absurd is quite visually dynamic—to a genuinely surprising degree."

At Impulse Magazine, Ben Burton wrote "Coyula collapses the boundaries between the personal, the artistic, the intellectual, and the political in part by threading together interrogations, family illness, and festival tours across vast periods. The way they are edited together makes these categories inescapable from each other. This makes the film both incredibly specific about life, art creation, and politics within Cuba but an equally poignant testimony to the reason why film is such an essential medium."

Andrew Truong at Reverse Shot wrote "The very existence of this brash film, which reveals the hearts of darkness at the center of Cuba's cultural institutions, is proof that creative expression may be hindered, or sometimes stalled, but it can never be stopped." He added that both Blue Heart and Chronicles of the Absurd were "intentionally provocative films that expose the mental gymnastics that uphold an illiberal society. They exemplify the irrepressible spirit of artistic creation, proof that someone is fighting the system from within. The closing title card in Chronicles of the Absurd is Coyula's ultimate act of defiance: “Made in Cuba.”

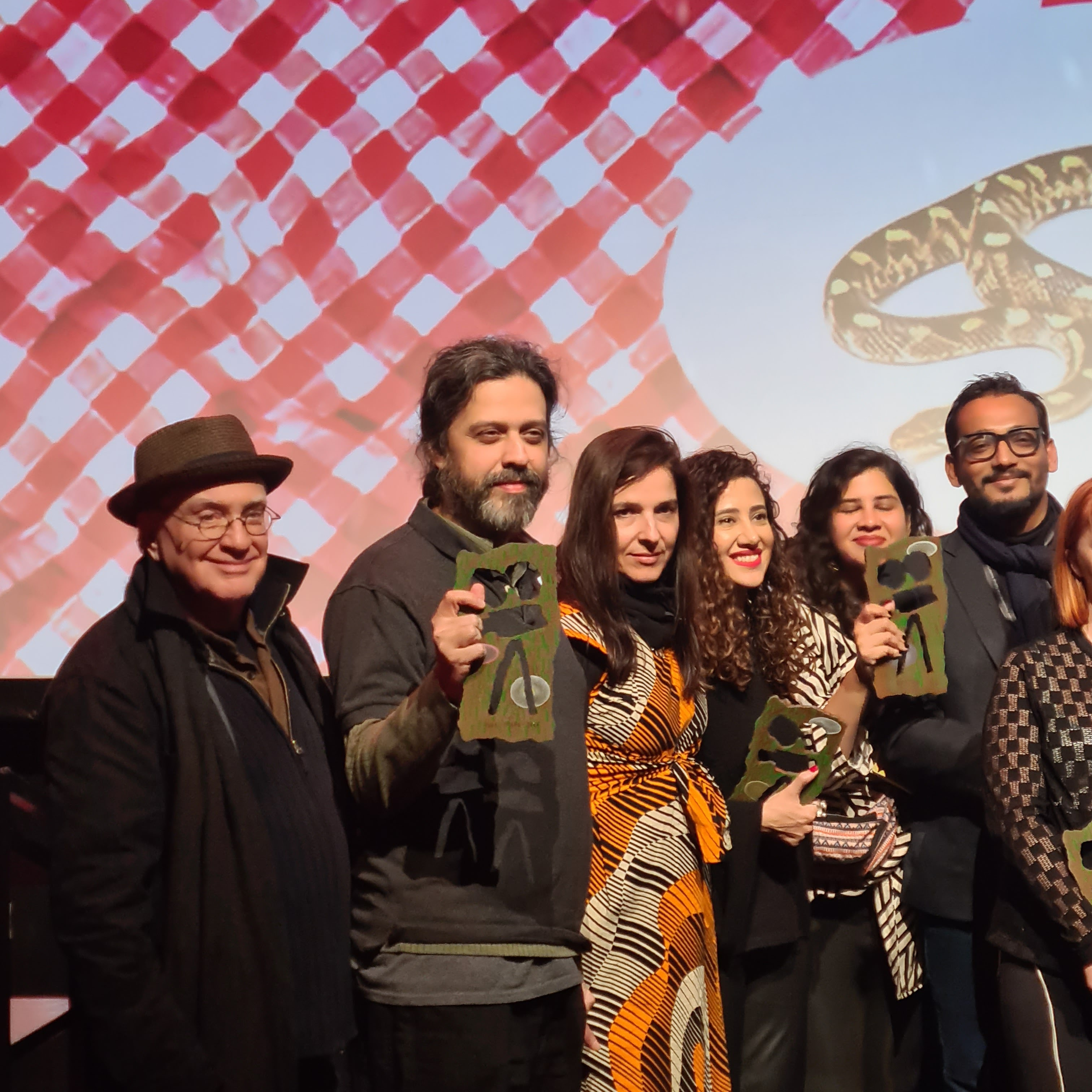
Associate producer David Leitner, director Miguel Coyula and producer Lynn Cruz at the IDFA award ceremony in 2024.

== Awards ==
- Envision Competition Award for Best Film, IDFA, The Netherlands, 2024
- Special Jury Prize, BAFICI, Argentina, 2025
- Best Non-Fiction film, Cinema Tropical, United States, 2026

== See also ==
- Cinema of Cuba
