= Miguel Coyula =

Cuban filmmaker and writer

- Miguel Coyula in 2026
- Born: Miguel Coyula Aquino; March 31, 1977; Havana, Cuba
- Citizenship: Cuban
- Education: International Film School of San Antonio de los Baños, Lee Strasberg Theatre and Film Institute
- Occupations: Film director, writer, cinematographer, and editor
- Years active: 1996–present
- Father: Mario Coyula Cowley
- Awards: Guggenheim Fellowship; Best Director, Málaga Film Festival, Latin American Territory, 2011; Jorge Cámara Award for Best Ibero-American Narrative Film Guadalajara International Film Festival, 2021; Best Film, Envision Competition, IDFA, 2024

Miguel Coyula Aquino (born March 31, 1977), professionally known as Miguel Coyula, is a Cuban film director, writer, cinematographer, and editor. He is considered one of the most distinctive voices in 21st-century Cuban cinema.

== Film career ==
At age 17, Coyula made his first short film with a VHS camcorder. He subsequently enrolled at the Escuela Internacional de Cine y Televisión (International Film and Television School) in San Antonio de los Baños, Cuba. In 2001, he received a scholarship at the Lee Strasberg Theatre and Film Institute. While attending the Strasberg Institute, Coyula made his first feature, Red Cockroaches (2003), for less than $2000 over a two-year period. Variety reviewed it as "a triumph of technology in the hands of a visionary”. The film subsequently developed an underground cult following.

In 2009, Coyula received a Guggenheim Fellowship to develop his second feature film, Memories of Overdevelopment (2010), a thematic follow-up to Tomás Gutiérrez Alea's Memories of Underdevelopment (1968), both based on novels by Edmundo Desnoes. The film premiered at the Sundance Film Festival in 2010. It follows an aging intellectual who leaves Cuba behind, but finds himself alienated from his new life in the United States. Senses of Cinema noted it for employing a frenetic, non linear montage of oversaturated digital composites, and shifting animated collages to create a kaleidoscopic portrait of a mind fractured by migration, memory, and political disillusionment. The Hollywood Reporter reviewed it as "thoughtful and cinematically bold" and "an affecting portrait of modern man becoming more and more isolated from a world he helped create." The international Film Guide describes it as "one of the best films Cuba has produced".

Miguel Coyula at the Sundance Film Festival, 2010

His next project Nobody (2017) won the Best Documentary award at the Global Film Festival in Santo Domingo, and it was screened at the Museum of Modern Art. The film follows Cuban writer Rafael Alcides as he, nearly blind, attempts to preserve his unpublished novels after the ink in his old typewriter fades, reflecting on the Cuban Revolution as a story of love and disillusionment. ScreenAnarchy described Coyula's "signature surrealist style and temporal editing" and highlighted the film's use of digital image manipulation, archival footage, and imagined conversations.

Filmed over a decade, his dystopian film Blue Heart (2021) premiered in the main competition at the Moscow International Film Festival. The film examines the consequences of a genetic experiment intended to create a new generation of revolutionary citizens. At the Guadalajara International Film Festival, it received the Jorge Cámara Award from the Hollywood Foreign Press Association for Best Ibero-American Narrative Film.Cinéaste critic Matthew David Roe described the film as "the culminating point of Coyula's artistic growth" and "his most visceral experience."

In 2024, his documentary Chronicles of the Absurd won the International Documentary Film Festival Amsterdam's Award for Best Film in the Envision Competition. The film follows Coyula and actor Lynn Cruz as they confront institutional control and intimidation in Cuba, documenting their experiences primarily through secret audio recordings, transcripts, photographs, and other visual materials which include animated paintings by Antonia Eiriz.

== Literary work ==
In 2013, La Pereza Ediciones published his science-fiction novel Mar rojo, Mal azul. Writing for Nagari, Carlos Gámez emphasized the novel's dialogue with cinematic language and described Coyula as “a solid writer who delves deeply into the psyche of his characters.” His second novel, La Isla Vertical, was published in 2022 by Ediciones Deslinde. Luis Álvarez described its narrative style as “of a decided, aseptic sobriety” and characterized the novel as focused on introspection and “a profound, devouring intimacy.” In 2024, Hurón Azul Ediciones published Coyula's essay collection Matar el realismo. Writing for Rialta, Ángel Pérez described the book as a volume that brings together Coyula's reflections on creation and the cultural, political, and artistic context in which he produced his films and novels. He stated that “Coyula is a director concerned with cinematic language,” concluding that “the titular phrase ‘killing realism’ is a declaration of principles.” Coyula has also written essays and articles on film and culture, including contributions to Rialta, Jump Cut, Cinéaste, and Havana Times.

== Style and themes ==
Coyula's films frequently feature misfit protagonists and offer pointed criticism of capitalism, religion, conservative morality, and what they portray as the betrayal of the Cuban Revolution's original socialist ideals. Film critic Dean Luis Reyes has described this as an anarchist tendency in Coyula's cinema, observing that the filmmaker often rejects conventional positive or altruistic resolutions in favor of annihilation.

Critics have also emphasized Coyula's experimentation with narrative structure and cinematic form. Scholar Michael Chanan characterized Coyula as a “contrarian who is more than a remarkable director, but also his own scriptwriter, cinematographer, editor and sound designer”. Describing his multidisciplinary methodology, Chanan referred to him “a born digital filmmaker, unburdened by the industrial division of labour.”

Coyula's approach to visual composition and editing departs from conventional filmmaking practices. He conceives each moment of a scene around what he considers its ideal frame, avoiding repeated shots and often requiring more setups than traditional coverage. This method allows him to construct scenes through carefully selected images intended to convey specific meanings while creating a growing sense of discomfort. Writing in Le Monde, film historian Paulo Antônio Paranaguá described Coyula's use of audiovisual collage and digital compositing, stating that “Alexandre Astruc dreamed of a camera-pen; Miguel Coyula invented the camera-scalpel.”

Analyzing Coyula's narrative structures, critic Franco Avicolli interprets his work as a search for an elusive original substance, fragmented within what he describes as the “dynamics of complexity.” He draws parallels between Coyula's approach and the expressive processes of music, painting and poetry, arguing that the meaning of his films emerges through contextual relationships rather than linear logic.

== Censorship ==
His films have faced censorship in Cuba, and exhibition restrictions in Argentina, Belarus, Morocco, and Lebanon.

== Selected filmography ==
- Válvula de luz (1997)
- Idea (1998)
- Buena Onda (Nice Going) (1999)
- Bailar sobre agujas (Dancing on Needles) (1999)
- Clase Z "Tropical" (2000)
- The Plastic Fork (2001)
- Red Cockroaches (2003)
- Memorias del desarrollo (Memories of Overdevelopment) (2010)
- Nadie (Nobody) (2017)
- Corazón azul (Blue Heart) (2021)
- Crónicas del absurdo (Chronicles of the Absurd) (2024)

== Books ==
- Mar rojo, Mal azul (2013)
- La Isla Vertical (2022)
- Matar el Realismo (2024)

== Selected awards and nominations ==
=== Chronicles of the Absurd ===
- Best Film, Envision Competition, IDFA, Netherlands, 2024.
- Special Jury Prize, BAFICI, Argentina, 2025
- Best Documentary, Cinema Tropical, United States, 2026

=== Blue Heart ===
- Award for audacity, Minsk International Film Festival, Belarus, 2021
- Jorge Cámara Award for Best Ibero-American Fiction Film, HFPA, Guadalajara International Film Festival, Mexico, 2021.
- Nominated for the Golden St.George Award, Moscow International Film Festival, Russia, 2021

=== Memories of Overdevelopment ===
- Audience Award for Best Foreign Feature Film, Arraial CineFest, Brazil, 2012
- Best Narrative Feature, Extreme World Cinema Festival San Sebastián de Veracruz, Mexico, 2012
- Best Director, Latin American Territory, Málaga Film Festival, Spain, 2011
- Cine Latino Award, Washington DC Independent Film Festival, USA, 2011
- Best Film, Muestra Joven ICAIC, Cuba, 2011
- Special Distinction, Latin ACE Awards, USA, 2011.
- Award for Innovation, Cero Latitud Film Festival, Ecuador, 2010
- Best Narrative Feature, Dallas Video Fest, USA, 2010
- Feature Length Award, New Media Film Festival, USA, 2010
- Special Mention, Cine Las Americas International Film Festival, USA, 2010
- Best Film, Havana Film Festival New York, USA, 2010

=== Red Cockroaches ===
- Best Editing, Fearless Tales Genre Festival, USA, 2005
- Narrative Competition Grand Prize, GreenCine Online Film Festival, USA, 2005
- Best of Fest, Microcinema Fest, USA, 2004
- Special Jury Award, Muestra de Jóvenes Realizadores, Cuba, 2004
- Gran Premio Plaza, Festival Cineplaza, Cuba, 2004.
- Special Mention for Visual Concept, Buenos Aires Rojo Sangre, Argentina, 2004
- Special Mention, Festival Internazionale de la Fantascienza, Italy, 2004.

== See also ==
- Cinema of Cuba
- Independent film
- Art film
- Cuban Literature

== Selected bibliography ==
- Venegas, Cristina (2010). Digital Dilemmas: The State, the Individual, and Digital Media in Cuba. New Brunswick, New Jersey: Rutgers University Press. ISBN 978-0-8135-4686-5.
- Gawrycki, Marcin Florian (2013). Między sztuką a polityką: kino i kubańska rewolucja [Between Art and Politics: Cinema and the Cuban Revolution]. Toruń: Wydawnictwo Adam Marszałek. ISBN 978-83-7780-662-3.
- Stone, Rob (2017). "Cubist Cuba: Memorias del desarrollo (Memories of Overdevelopment, 2010)." In Guy Baron, Ann Marie Stock, and Antonio Álvarez Pitaluga (eds.), The Cinema of Cuba: Contemporary Film and the Legacy of Revolution. London: I.B. Tauris, pp. 105–132. ISBN 978-1-78453-814-9.
- Reyes, Dean Luis. El gobierno de mañana: La invención del cine cubano independiente (2001–2015). Rialta Ediciones, 2020. ISBN 978-607-98518-9-7. Open-access edition.
- Cruz, Lynn. Crónica azul (Diez años de rodaje). Éditions Fra, 2022. ISBN 978-80-7521-207-8. Digital edition.
- Reyes, Dean Luis. "The Long Slog of Totalitarianism: Contemporary Cuban Cinema as Dystopian Regime." In Fehimović, Dunja; Lastre, Reynaldo; Longueira Borrego, Nils; and Morales Sosa, Isdanny, eds. Memory in Contemporary Cuban Film and Digital Media: Entangled Temporalities. University Press of Florida, 2026, pp. 192–201. ISBN 978-1-68340-573-3.
