= Rafael Alcides =

Cuban poet, novelist, and journalist

Rafael Alcides Pérez
- Born: 9 June 1933; Barrancas, Oriente Province, Cuba
- Died: 19 June 2018; Havana, Cuba
- Occupations: Poet, novelist, journalist
- Writing career
- Language: Spanish
- Period: 1950s–2018
- Genres: Poetry, novel
- Notable works: Agradecido como un perro; Nadie; Pata de Palo
- Notable awards: Casa de las Américas honourable mention (1965); Cuban Critics' Award (1983); Bodegas Olarra–Café Bretón Prize (2011); Gastón Baquero National Independent Literature Prize (2015)

Rafael Alcides Pérez (9 June 1933 – 19 June 2018) was a Cuban poet, novelist and journalist associated with the Generation of the 1950s in Cuban literature. His work combined colloquial language, sensuality, irony and personal reflection. His later career became marked by the withdrawal from Cuba's official literary institutions due to his political disillusionment with Fidel Castro’s revolution.

== Life and work ==
Born in Barrancas, eastern Cuba, Alcides moved to Havana in 1953. He worked as a baker, a logger, and sugar cane cutter, among other occupations before joining the revolutionary struggle as part of the 26th of July clandestine movement in Havana. Following the Cuban Revolution, he worked for the Ministry of Foreign Relations and in Cuban Television (ICRT). He was also one of the founders of the Union of Writers and Artists of Cuba (UNEAC) in 1961.

Associated with the development of colloquial poetry in Cuba, he distinguished himself from other contemporaries such as Fayad Amis, and Pablo Armando Fernandez, through an irreverent voice, conversational language and an autobiographical narration. His 1967 collection La pata de palo was retrospectively reviewed by critic Norge Espinosa Mendoza as a defining work in the development of the literary landscape of his generation. Poet Reina María Rodríguez wrote in Rialta about Alcides's style “Cuban poetry is not sarcastic; Alcides was. Sarcasm came with his political radicalization, which struck back not only through the subjects he addressed, but also through the irreverence with which he treated them.” In 2016, Carlos Manuel Álvarez wrote “At eighty-two, Rafael Alcides is Cuba's counterweight.” He also called him “the greatest poet alive in Cuba, and probably the most honest, the most unjustly silenced, the one who has paid the highest price for his nobility.”

Aside from poetry, Alcides writing also encompassed fiction, chronicles and journalism.

== Political estrangement ==
Alcides grew increasingly disillusioned with the Cuban government after the revolution. His novel Contracastro, which received an honourable mention in the 1965 Casa de las Américas literary competition, remained unpublished during his lifetime. In 1993, he withdrew from public literary activity, a period of self-imposed isolation often described as insilio (internal exile). He would officially present his resignation as a member of UNEAC in 2014. In a posthumously published interview in OnCuba, he discussed his decision to distance himself from the country's official cultural institutions.

In 2017, Alcides was the protagonist of Miguel Coyula’s documentary Nadie. Combining interviews, archival material and fictional elements, the film explores Alcides's literary and political isolation. A year later he died at his home in Havana.

== Selected works ==
- Himnos de montaña (1961)
- Gitana (1962)
- La pata de palo (1967)
- Agradecido como un perro (1983)
- Nadie (1993)
- GMT: Poesía seleccionada (1963–2008) (2009)
- Memorias del porvenir (2011)
- Conversaciones con Dios (2014)
- Contracastro (2018, posthumous)

== Awards and honours ==
- 1965 – Honourable mention in the Casa de las Américas Literary Contest for his novel Contracastro.
- 1983 – Cuban Critics' Award (Premio de la Crítica) for the poetry collection Agradecido como un perro.
- 2011 – XVII Bodegas Olarra–Café Bretón Literary Prize for Memorias del porvenir, awarded unanimously by the jury.
- 2015 – Gastón Baquero National Independent Literature Prize (Premio Nacional de Literatura Independiente Gastón Baquero).
