= Talia Rubel =

American film and theater actress

- Born: 1979; New Jersey
- Occupation: Actress

Talia Rubel is a film and theater actress. She graduated from the Mason Gross School of the Arts with a BFA in acting. Since that time, she has performed in a number of Off-Broadway plays, including 68 and Stalking Perfection, and produced and starred in the play I Found Her Tied to My Bed. Her company, Put-on-Stuff Productions, focuses on commissioning new works that examine female characters in different genres and contexts. She was the female lead in Miguel Coyula's Red Cockroaches (2003) performing the part of Lily Zarrasky. The film went on to gather many awards in the International Festival Circuit
