= Clase Z "Tropical" =

Cuban short film directed by Miguel Coyula

Clase Z "Tropical" (Class Z Tropical) is a Cuban short film directed by Miguel Coyula. The film is a parody of Hollywood's action blockbusters using the typical trailer of a B-movie. The director deconstructs action melodrama formulas using the structure of a trailer. The movie contains frantic pacing, use of split screens, and dark humor, and the short gained notable popularity in Cuban Film Festivals where Coyula won several awards. The short is 6 minutes long and has been aired on Cuban TV Shows several times since its release in 2000. Coyula described the film a part of a series of experiments in genre the director made before completing the feature length Red Cockroaches.

== Awards ==
- FIPRESCI Award, Festival el Almacén de la Imagen, Cuba
- Cinema Award, Festival el Almacén de la Imagen, Cuba
- Best Experimental Film, Festival el Almacén de la Imagen, Cuba
- Best Editing, Festival el Almacén de la Imagen, Cuba
- Best Sound, Festival el Almacén de la Imagen, Cuba
- Best Experimental Short, Festival Nacional de Video, Havana, Cuba.
- Best Editing, Festival Nacional de Video, Havana, Cuba.
- Best Sound, Festival Nacional de Video, Havana, Cuba.
- Hermanos Saiz Award, Festival Nacional de Video, Havana, Cuba.
