= Cinema of Cuba =

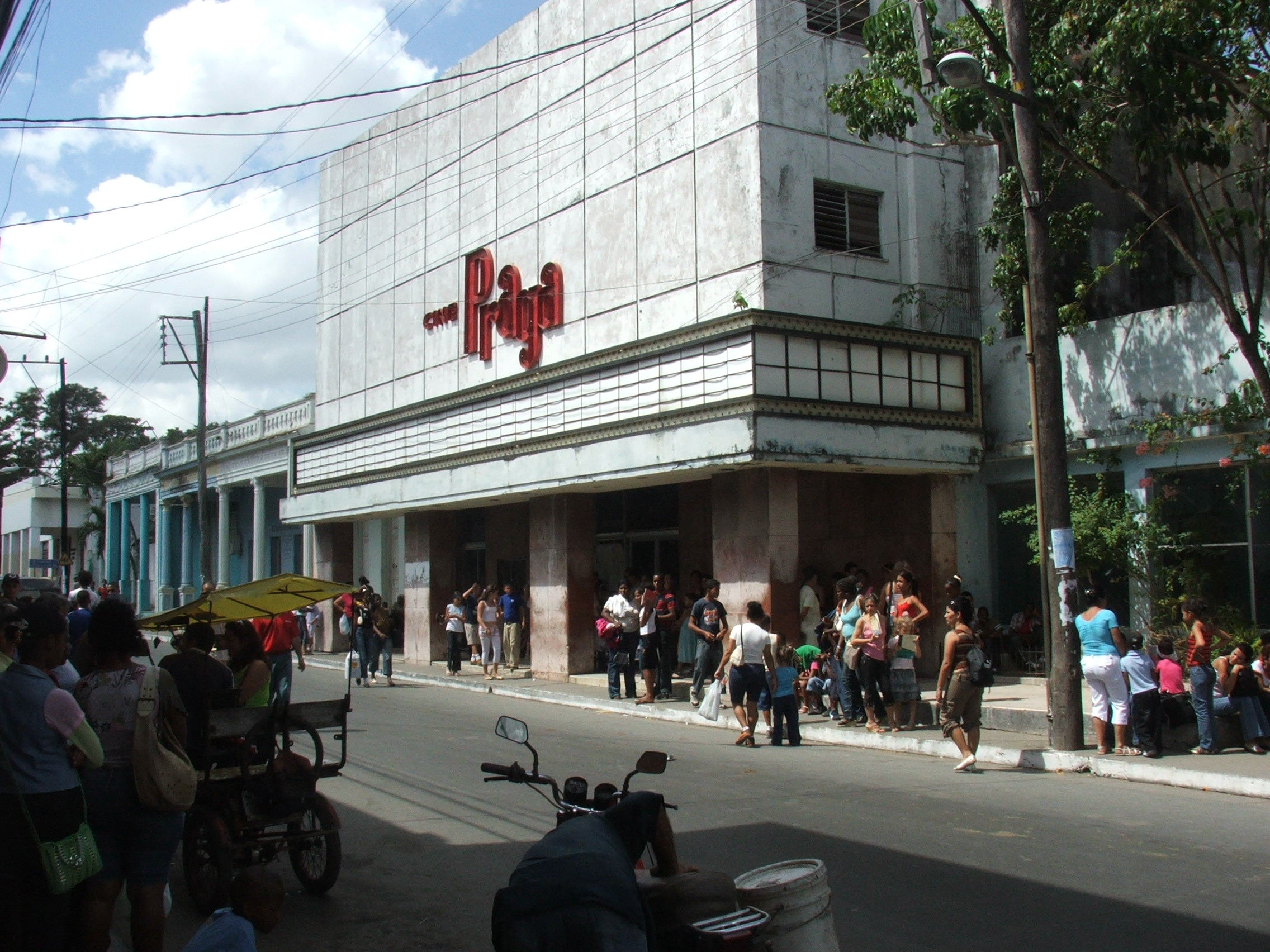
- Cine Praga in Pinar del Rio, Cuba
- No. of screens: 313 (2009)
  - Per capita: 3.0 per 100,000 (2009)
- Main distributors: Dist. Nac. ICAIC 100.0%

Produced feature films (2009)
- Fictional: 8

Number of admissions (2011)
- Total: 2,230,200

Gross box office (2006)
- Total: CUP 2.45 million
- National films: CUP 1.36 million (55.7%)

Cinema of Cuba (Spanish: Cine de Cuba) arrived in Cuba at the beginning of the 20th century. Before the Cuban Revolution of 1959, about 80 full-length films were produced in Cuba. Most of these films were melodramas. Following the revolution, Cuba entered what is considered the "Golden age" of Cuban cinema.

== History ==
After being popularised by the brothers Louis Jean and Auguste Marie Lumière, the cinematographe traveled through several capital cities in different American countries before arriving in Havana, which occurred on January 24, 1897. It was brought from Mexico by Gabriel Veyre. The first presentation was offered at Paseo del Prado #126, just aside the Teatro Tacón. Four short films were shown: Partida de cartas, El tren, El regador y el muchacho y El sombrero cómico. The tickets were sold at a price of 50 cents, and 20 cents for kids and the military. Short after, Veyre performed a leading role in the first film produced in the island, Simulacro de incendio, a documentary centered around firemen in Havana.

In this first phase of introduction there were several locations devoted to cinema: Panorama Soler, Salón de variedades o ilusiones ópticas, Paseo del Prado #118, Vitascopio de Edison (in the famous Louvre sidewalk). The Teatro Irioja (today Teatro Martí) was the first to present cinema as one of its attractions. The first in a long list of movie theatres in Havana was set by José A. Casasús, actor, producer and entrepreneur, under the name of "Floradora", later renamed "Alaska".

In the six or seven years before World War I, cinema was expanded and stabilized as a business in the most important cities in Latin America. Cuba, just as the rest of the countries in the continent, went through those first years with itinerant and sporadic exhibitions, changing from European providers to North American providers, starting the dependency on the big Hollywood companies.

The first ambitious genre in the continent was probably historic reviews. In Cuba films like El Capitán Mambí and Libertadores o guerrilleros (1914), by Enríque Díaz Quesada with support from Gen. Mario García Menocal are worth mentioning. Díaz Quesada adapted from the Spanish novelist Joaquín Dicenta in 1910, as a tendency widely used then, of using literary works adapted for movies, as well as imitating Charlie Chaplin, the French comedies and cowboy adventure films. The silent stage of production was extended until 1937, when the first full-length fiction movie was produced.

=== Pre-revolutionary cinema ===
Before the Cuban Revolution of 1959 the total film production was around 80 full-length movies. Some films are worth mentioning, such as La Virgen de la Caridad starring Miguel Santos and Romance del Palmar by Ramón Peón. Many famous people from the continent came to the island to film, and some leading Cuban actors had a strong presence mainly in Mexico and Argentina. Musicians such as Ernesto Lecuona, Bola de Nieve or Rita Montaner also performed and composed for movies in several countries.

=== Cinema after the revolution ===
In the first days of 1959, the new government created a cinematographic department within the Dirección de Cultura del Ejército Rebelde (Culture Division of the Rebel Army), which sponsored the production of documentaries such as Esta tierra nuestra by Tomás Gutiérrez Alea, and La vivienda by Julio García Espinosa. This was the direct ancestor of what would eventually become the Instituto Cubano del Arte y la Industria Cinematográficos (ICAIC), which was founded in March as a result of the first culture law of the revolutionary government. Film, according to this law, is "the most powerful and provocative form of artistic expression, and the most direct and widespread vehicle for education and bringing ideas to the public." The ICAIC founded Cine Cubano in 1960. All production, distribution, and exhibition in the country were run by ICAIC by 1965. The ICAIC also established mobile projection units called cine moviles, trucks that visited remote areas to hold screenings. From its foundation up until 1980, Alfredo Guevara was head of the ICAIC. Under his direction, the organization was pivotal in the development of Cuban cinema which came to be identified with anti-imperialism and revolution.

The first ten years of the institution were called by critics the Golden Age (Década de Oro) of Cuban cinema, most of all because of the making of Lucía (1969) by Humberto Solás and Memorias del subdesarrollo (Memories of Underdevelopment) (1968) by Tomás Gutiérrez Alea. These two directors are often regarded as the best film directors to have come out of Cuba. Memorias del subdesarrollo was selected among the best 100 films of all times by the International Federation of Film Clubs. One of the most prolific and strong branches of the Cuban cinema in the last 40 years has been documentaries and short-films. The documentary Now (1965) by Santiago Álvarez is often considered the first video clip in history. It combines a song with an uninterrupted sequence of images depicting racial discrimination in the U.S..

Animation has also been a major highlight in the last decades. In 1974, Juan Padrón gave birth to Elpidio Valdés, a character that represents a mambí fighter, struggling for Cuban independence against the Spanish occupation in the 19th century. It is very popular among Cuban children. Another great success of Cuban animation was the full-length film Vampiros en La Habana (1983), also by Juan Padrón.

Essential in the history of Cuban cinema is the Noticiero ICAIC Latinoamericano (Latin-American ICAIC News) whose first director was Alfredo Guevara. Years later it was directed by Santiago Álvarez and the Mexican Rodolfo Espino, the most successful documentary maker in the island. In 1979 the ICAIC played a key role in the creation of the Festival Internacional del Nuevo Cine Latinoamericano (International Festival of New Latin American Cinema) allowing Latin American films a more international audience. The festival is one of the most important of its type in Latin America and has been held in Havana every year since 1979. There is also an international cinema university, the Escuela Internacional de Cine, Televisión y Video de San Antonio de los Baños (International School of Cinema, Television and Video of San Antonio de los Baños) located in San Antonio de los Baños near Havana, on land donated by the Cuban government and supported by the Fundación del Nuevo Cine Latinoamericano, Gabriel García Márquez and the Father of the New Latin American Cinema, Fernando Birri. Hundreds of young students from all over Latin America have studied direction, script, photography and edition.

The contribution of the ICAIC, which was rapidly positioned as the head of a process aiming for legitimate artistic values and expression of nationality, is not limited only to the support in producing and promoting a movement that spanned fiction, documentary and animation, but also allowed for the exhibition and spread of popular knowledge of the best of cinema from all over the world. It also created the film archives of the Cinemateca de Cuba, and took part in initiatives such as Cinemóviles, which made cinema available on the most intricate sites of the national geography.

The institution also helped developing the Cuban poster, as a mean of promoting films. It gave birth between 1969 and 1977, to the Grupo de Experimentación Sonora, which influenced Cuban music to a great extent, serving as a starting point for the movement of the Nueva Trova. Figures like Silvio Rodríguez, Pablo Milanés and Leo Brouwer were prominent through all this process.

In 1980, Alfredo Guevara was ousted from his position as head of the ICAIC, which he had held since its formation, over controversies about Cecilia'. The film, directed by Humberto Solás, was based on the 19th century Cuban novel Cecilia Valdés. It was the most ambitious Cuban film to date and somewhat monopolized the funds available to filmmakers during its production. This, coupled with the fact that many other directors and the general public did not agree with Solás's interpretation of the film, led to the removal of Alfredo Guevara from his position.

Having won a great deal of autonomy from the central government in the 1970s, the ICAIC, under the new leadership of Julio García Espinosa, was allowed to make many films dealing with sociopolitical issues. Espinosa was able to increase the recognition of Cuban film and especially of the International Festival of New Latin American Cinema by obtaining greater funds from the government and also inviting big names such as Francis Ford Coppola, Sydney Pollack, Robert De Niro, and Jack Lemmon to the island. Despite his successes, Espinosa faced a large problem in 1991, again due to a controversial film. This film, entitled Alicia en el pueblo de Maravillas, was very critical of the bureaucracy of the government. This, combined with the simultaneous collapse of the Soviet Union, led to Espinosa's retirement.

During this time, Alfredo Guevara returned to the scene of the ICAIC in order to help it maintain its autonomy from the central government. Many of the party faithful were calling for the organization to merge with the Cuban Radio and Television Institute. Due to the loss of Cuba's largest trading partner, the Soviet Union, the future of the island country became uncertain, and criticism of the government, which the ICAIC was known for, became unpopular. Guevara managed to get the film released and allow the ICAIC to keep its independent status. He then remained president of the organization throughout the Special Period until his retirement in 2000.

One of the most notable Cuban films in the recent years was Fresa y chocolate (Strawberry and Chocolate) (1993) by Tomás Gutiérrez Alea and Juan Carlos Tabío. It is about intolerance, and portrays the friendship between a homosexual and a young member of the Unión de Jóvenes Comunistas (a communist youth organization). It was also the first Cuban production to ever be nominated for an Academy Award.

Omar González succeeded Alfredo Guevara as the head of the ICAIC and remains in that position today. It continues to directly aid in the production and distribution of films and has production offices, issues film permits, rents studios and equipment to filmmakers, and is closely involved in each stage of the film, from its inception and production, to its distribution and release.

=== Cinema of the Cuban diaspora ===
After the triumph of the Cuban Revolution in 1959, Cubans who were ideologically ill at ease with the new revolutionary government made their way to the United States, where they settled in concentrated communities made up of other Cubans in South Florida, New York, and North New Jersey. Unlike traditional immigrants who chose to leave the homeland behind in search of a better way of life in a new place, most of these Cubans consider themselves exiles forced out of their homeland by political or economic circumstances. Because they continue to think of themselves as Cuban even after decades in the United States, it is appropriate to talk about them as part of a Cuban diaspora that links them emotionally and psychologically to the island. Over one million Cubans have left Cuba since 1959 in different waves of immigration. Among those are talented directors, technicians and actors who settled in the US, Latin America or Europe, in search of work and creative space in the field of cinema.

Los gusanos (The Worms) (1978) produced by Danilo Bardisa and directed by Camilo Vila was the first film made by the Cuban exiles dealing with Cuban politics. The screenplay written by Orestes Matacena, Clara Hernandez and Camilo Vila has an overwhelming impact in the U.S. Cuban community inspiring many other Cuban filmmakers to tell their stories with their cameras.

Orlando Jiménez Leal, one of the best known exile filmmakers, produced El Super (1979), the first Cuban exile fictional film, directed by Jiménez Leal and his young brother-in-law, Leon Ichaso. Based on a play by Ivan Acosta, the film was broadly distributed in the U.S. and won awards at film festivals in Mannheim, Biarritz and Venice. The film examines the trauma of the Cuban middle class, showing them as displaced from their former life and unable to adapt to new circumstances. It also highlights generational conflicts between Cuban-born parents and their teenage children who have been raised in the U.S. and reject tradition in favor of the North American way of life. Jiménez Leal went on to make documentary films such as The Other Cuba (1983) and Improper Conduct (1984) in collaboration with Néstor Almendros. Improper Conduct is a highly controversial film that deals with the treatment of gays in Cuba. The Other Cuba is a bitter denunciation of the Revolution told from the point of view of the exiled community. The director's strong anti-Castro stance gave voice to the growing community of Cuban political exiles in the U.S. in the 1980s.

Leon Ichaso's best known film in the U.S. is Bitter Sugar (1996), a fictional film that strongly criticizes life in post-revolutionary Cuba. The screenplay, written by Ichaso and Orestes Matacena shows the disillusionment of a young Communist and his girlfriend, who are pushed to the breaking point by a repressive society. In tone and theme, it is similar to Jorge Ulla's Guaguasí (1982), which had less distribution in the U.S. The Guaguasí screenplay, written by Orestes Matacena, Clara Hernandez and Ulla, portrays a simple man from the countryside, played by actor Orestes Matacena, who is brutalized by his experiences with the revolutionary government in Cuba. The reactionary stance of directors like Villa, Ulla, Ichaso, Almendros and Jiménez Leal has made them the cinematic spokespersons for Cubans who believe that Fidel Castro is personally responsible for negative changes that have occurred in Cuba since 1959. Bitter Sugar has been shown to the Human Rights Commission in Geneva, Switzerland and to the US Congress.

An important theme in cinema of the Cuban diaspora is the coming and going of people in exile, and the difficult process of adaptation to a new culture. Iván Acosta made the film Amigos (1986) to show the painful bicultural existence of Cuban-Americans living in Miami. Although it is a low-budget film, it does an effective job of capturing the problems of the younger generation of Cuban-Americans who are torn between the desire to fit in and the pressure to uphold tradition. Lejanía (1985) by Jesús Díaz is the first film to deal with the issue of Cuban exiles returning to the island for visits with relatives. Cercanía (2008) by Rolando Díaz, the brother of Jesús, shows a recent arrival from Cuba attempting to reconcile with his family in Miami after decades apart. Rather than address political themes in a direct way, these films focus on personal issues related to adaptation and culture shock. Honey for Oshún (2001) by Humberto Solás, a Cuban director who remained in Cuba, addresses the clash between Cuban-Americans returning to the island and those who never left. It hints that reconciliation is possible, as long as those who return are willing to accept Cuba on its own terms and not force capitalist ideology on the Cuban people.

In Cuba, films made by Cuban-Americans or Cubans in exile are not widely distributed or well known, in part because the films deal with the Revolution in a negative light, but also because Cubans on the island dispute the notion of a Cuban diaspora and believe that those who live in exile no longer represent Cuban reality in an authentic light. They take the position that directors who experience life outside Cuba represent Cuba through a distorted lens, and that the films they make are largely works of propaganda.

Many important Cuban actors now live in exile. Among them are César Évora, Anabel Leal, Reinaldo Cruz, Francisco Gattorno, Reynaldo Miravalles, Tomás Millán, William Marquez, Orestes Matacena and Isabel Moreno. Cuban American actors who were born in Cuba but grew up in the U.S. include Andy García, Steven Bauer, William Levy, and Tony Plana.

=== International co-productions ===
The international co-production of films has become very important for the cinema of Cuba and also for the rest of Latin America. An internationally co-produced film is one in which two or more production companies from different countries are involved, or the financing has been sourced from more than one country. Co-productions are becoming increasingly common today but even as early as 1948 were common between Cuba and Mexico.

International co-productions began to take off in the 1960s and 1970s, many with the aim of increasing political awareness and highlighting common problems in Latin American countries. Before its dissolution, the USSR also played a role of co-producing films in Cuba such as Mikhail Kalatozov's I Am Cuba. The increased importance of co-produced films was inevitable due to globalization, and in the case of Cuba especially, due to a lack of economic resources. A film created with the cooperation of two or more countries nearly always guaranteed distribution in both countries, resulting in a greater audience and increased revenues. This also allowed for more exposure of regional cinemas.

Beginning as early as the 1930s Spain played a role in producing Latin American and Cuban films, but began to invest more heavily in the 1990s. In 1997, Ibermedia was created for the purpose of promoting co-production between Spain and Latin American countries. There are 14 countries involved in this organization and Cuba is one of them. Two examples of Cuban co-produced films are Humberto Solás's Cecilia (Cuba/Spain) and Tomás Gutiérrez Alea and Juan Carlos Tabío's Academy Award-nominated Strawberry and Chocolate (Cuba/Mexico/Spain).

There have been mixed opinions about the development of co-productions. For some it is a necessary evil. Humberto Solás states that "For established filmmakers there is not a single cent for production. We are obliged to seek co-productions. If a film is not co-produced, it will not be made." The problem with finding foreign funding for Cuban films is that, often, the financiers want to have some amount of influence over the final product so that it can be successful in their own countries. Frequently there are also stipulations that require a certain number of cast and crew to be working on the film from each of the producing countries. For example, a Cuban film that was co-produced by Spain would require a certain number of Spanish actors, writers or directors, and production technicians. This makes it difficult for Cuban national cinema to hold on to its identity and also creates issues when determining the nationality of a film. Julio García Espinosa agrees that the benefit of co-productions is that it has allowed for films to continue being made in Cuba and Latin America, but believes that the most successful co-productions are those that exist solely between Latin American countries.

Cuba has been involved in aiding in the production of other Latin American films, but through technical assistance rather than acting as a financier. One example is Chilean director Miguel Littín's Academy Award-nominated Alsino and the Condor, which was shot in Nicaragua and received technical support from Cuba. Also in the late 1980s, Cuba created the Third World Film School to train students from various third world countries in the art of filmmaking.

== Imperfect cinema ==
Cuban cinema and Latin American films communicate many different meanings, messages, and focuses. Cuban film director Julio García Espinosa was well known in the 1960s for his contributions to cinematography and culture. He was a founder of the ICAIC and the President of the Section of Cinema of the Cultural Society. The main objectives of Cuban cinema were production, distribution, and screening films that recorded the ongoing revolutionary process from the perspectives of ordinary people. According to Davies, the films that were shot on location and featured local people were shown free of charge across the country in city cinemas and on makeshift village screens to spectators who were encouraged to participate actively in the films' reception and interpretation. In 1968–88, the most common and desired form of film used in Cuba was Imperfect Cinema.

It can be acknowledged that Imperfect Cinema was creative, innovative and possessed a distinctive style that is typically a very thought provoking original work of art, Oscar Quirós concluded. Imperfect films captured the viewer's attention because the relevance of the story line matched what the audiences were experiencing in their own lives. Imperfect Cinema is a form or theme found through audiences that have struggled in life and are aware of the hard times the people were going through. Only in the person who suffers people perceive elegance, gravity, even beauty; only in him people recognize the possibility of authenticity, seriousness, and sincerity. Not only does imperfect cinema represent the struggles of the people it also reveals the process which has generated the problem. The subjective element is the selection of the problem, conditioned as it is by the interest of the audience-which is the subject. The objective element is showing the process-which is the object. Imperfect Cinema uses the audience as the subject to show the process of the problem as the object.

Aside from indicating the demonstrative, communicative and inquisitive qualities, these characteristics also convey an implicit utilitarian quality. In other words, Imperfect Cinema possesses utilitarian features because it must perform a particular political function within society. Cubans felt included by the films which gave them a sense of importance and pride. Cuban and Latin American films were successful in the international market even though they did not always fit the hegemonic models or use mainstream film languages. Imperfect Cinema is a great example of film that is accepted internationally even though it does not fit into the Hollywood genre or codes of representation.

Style for Imperfect Cinema is thus defined by the specific techniques and qualities contextualized in orthodox Marxism's aesthetics of content over form, such as the use of 'type' characters, harsh imagery made by scratches, under/over exposure, high contrast, excessive movements of the camera, presentation of historical events and the wide use of hand-held cameras. This form of film was very popular among the revolutionary people because the films were portrayed in a manner that was very easy to relate to and shared a common feeling and interest among the people that were experiencing similar situations that were occurring in Cuba at the time. The revolution provided alternatives, supplied an entirely new response, enabled the country to do away with elitist concepts and practices in art, and was the highest expression of culture because it abolished artistic culture as a fragmentary human activity.

Imperfect Cinema was responsible for making a reputation for Cuban film, but by the mid-1970s, Cuban filmmakers were purposely making a different style of cinema. Chanan, for example, concludes that by the late 1970s Imperfect Cinema had just about disappeared. He believes that since then Cuban cinema has given up the challenge of creating its own style in favor of imitating Hollywood. For Garcia Espinosa and many of his fellow Latin American filmmakers, Imperfect Cinema was the answer to the need of creating a form of art that demonstrates the process of the problems ... not a cinema to beautifully illustrate concepts and ideas they already know. The purpose of this revolutionary form of film was derived from the revolution itself. By 1989, Cuban cinema had the formal sophistication to carry any revolutionary message, or none at all, Quirós indicated. Imperfect cinema was no longer interested in quality or technique. It can be created equally well with a Mitchell or with an 8mm camera, in a studio or in a guerrilla camp in the middle of the jungle.

Since all of these critical operations require new approaches to film directing, they cannot expect flawless results every time. Films built on the consecrated conventions of traditional cinematography are more likely to attain technical "perfection" than those necessarily "imperfect" attempts to challenge established conventions and search out new approaches. The opposite of imperfect cinema is "perfect" cinema which is basically described as films that are portrayed as perfect, flawless, and contain beautiful scenery. The majority of scenes that are shot in a "perfect" film are in a beautiful place, typically the film is not produced to make the viewer think, and they're usually more aesthetically pleasing rather than meaningful. They maintain that imperfect cinema must above all show the process which generates the problems. It is thus the opposite of a cinema principally dedicated to celebrating results, the opposite of a self-sufficient and contemplative cinema, the opposite of a cinema which "beautifully illustrates" ideas or concepts which already possess. However, the aesthetic changes that were better perceived after the mid-1970s were a reflexion of the social underlying changes in the ideological Marxist fabric away from Orthodox Marxism and more in tune with the Marxian ideal of emancipation. The new Perfect Cinema is not a cinema to move away from the social, political, and economic issues of Cuban society, but it is a move forward to better illustrate the Cuban social whole. These aesthetic changes that characterize Perfect Cinema predate the collapse of the Soviet bloc and the end of the Cold War underlying the significance of this new Cuban style of cinema as both as manifestation of social changes and a leader of such a change.

Modern authorship is established and valued mostly as a matter of output and public success. "Perfect" films are valued by critics, awards, and merchandise that are produced because of the film. Compared to "perfect" films, imperfect films focus on the art, sending a message, and creating substance. Most Latin American films can only achieve success in the international market if they emulate hegemonic models and borrow from mainstream film languages. The "perfect" films are difficult for Latin American and Cuban film makers to compete with because most viewers are interested in watching films that are visually attractive and don't require a lot of thought while watching. It stands to reason that today's changing circumstances of film production and consumption determine that genres cannot exist by mere repetition and recycling of past models but have to engage with difference and change. Art will not disappear into nothingness; it will disappear into everything.

=== Post-Cold War era ===
The post Cold War period is known as the "Special Period" in Cuba. During this time period the Cuban cinema industry suffered greatly (as did the Cuban citizens due to severe economic depression). This is best phrased by Elliott Young:

The state expected artists, filmmakers, and intellectuals to become economically autonomous and not rely on state subsidies; this new market orientation forced cultural producers to seek foreign financing or simply to leave the country altogether. The impact of the economic crisis hit the Instituto Cubano del Arte e Industria Cinematográfico (ICAIC) directly, leading to an exodus of personnel and the slowing down of production to the extent that, in 1996, the Institute did not release a single feature film.

The films that were produced were no longer made solely for Cuban people, but mainly for foreign audiences. Pastor Vega states "Before one only thought about the Cuban public. Now you have to think about 'marketing' and 'profits' and all that". However, the films that were produced for the Cuban people, tended to take a more drastic turn towards more controversial issues. One of the biggest genres that came out of this period was about homosexuality. One of the most popular movies that come out of this time period is called Fresa y chocolate (1994, Strawberry and Chocolate). The success of this movie "can be partially explained by the way the film elicits multiple recognition from the Cuban viewer" and that it makes the viewer think/look at the film in a different light.

During this time the producers and directors had to always think about cost of production. In the past, going on long excursions to make films were the standard rather than the exception. A perfect example of a movie that was made through this time period is called Madagascar (1994), directed by Fernando Perez. Ann Marie Stock states (about the production of Madagascar):

Madagascar (1994), was made against all odds, during a time when Cuba's state sponsored film institute was experiencing shortages of virgin film stock, fuel to transport crews and equipment, food to provide a meal to those working long days, and the hard currency necessary to edit, produce and distribute films.

The films that were lucky enough to be put into production, found them that they were being produced as close to the ICAIC (Cuban Institute of Cinematographic Art and Industry) as possible, or found that the major cities (Havana, Santiago de Cuba, etc. ...) became the backdrop to the plot of the movies. This allowed the directors to use ordinary citizens in the movies instead of having to bring in extras for production. The director could even use citizens' homes as a backdrop, if the owner agreed to allow the director to use it.

== Renowned figures ==
=== Directors ===
- Santiago Álvarez
- Octavio Cortázar
- Juan Carlos Cremata
- Rolando Díaz
- Sergio Giral
- Pavel Giroud
- Manuel Octavio Gómez
- Sara Gómez
- Nicolás Guillén Landrián
- Tomás Gutiérrez Alea
- Eduardo Manet
- Orestes Matacena
- Jorge Molina
- Fernando Pérez
- Mario Rivas
- Jorge Luis Sánchez
- Humberto Solás
- Oscar Valdés
- Humberto López y Guerra
- Juan Carlos Tabío
- Pastor Vega
- Miguel Coyula
- Ernesto Daranas

=== Actors and actresses ===
- Luis Alberto García
- Ana de Armas
- Beatriz Valdés
- César Évora
- Daisy Granados
- Adolfo Llauradó
- Enrique Molina
- Eva Méndez
- Jorge Perugorría
- Mario Cimarro
- Mijail Mulkay
- Orestes Matacena
- Reinaldo Miravalles
- Renny Arozarena
- Rogelio Blaín
- Sergio Corrieri
- Tito Junco
- Vladimir Cruz

== Cuban films ==
A list of some of the more important Cuban films produced since 1959:

- Las doce sillas - The Twelve Chairs (Tomás Gutiérrez Alea, 1962)
- Muerte de un burócrata - Death of a Bureaucrat (Tomás Gutiérrez Alea, 1966)
- Memorias del subdesarrollo - Memories of Underdevelopment (Tomás Gutiérrez Alea, 1968)
- Coffea Arábiga - (Nicolás Guillen Landrián, 1968)
- Lucía (Humberto Solás, 1969)
- The First Charge of the Machete - La primera carga al machete (Manuel Octavio Gómez, 1969)
- El hombre de Maisinicú - The Man from Maisinicú (Manuel Pérez (filmmaker), 1973) - entered into the 8th Moscow International Film Festival
- De cierta manera - In a Certain Way (filming finished by Sara Gómez in 1973 before her death, technical work completed by Tomás Gutiérrez Alea before its release in 1977)
- La última cena - The Last Supper (Tomás Gutiérrez Alea, 1976)
- El brigadista - The Teacher (Octavio Cortázar, 1977)
- Retrato de Teresa - Portrait of Teresa (Pastor Vega, 1979)
- Los sobrevivientes - The Survivors (Tomás Gutiérrez Alea, 1979)
- Guardafronteras - Coastguards (Octavio Cortázar, 1980)
- Crónica de una infamia - Chronicle of an Infamy (Miguel Torres, 1982)
- Los pájaros tirándole a la escopeta - Birds Shooting the Shotgun (Rolando Díaz, 1982)
- Vampiros en La Habana - Vampires in Havana! (Juan Padrón, 1983)
- Hasta cierto punto - Up to a Certain Point (Tomás Gutiérrez Alea, 1983)
- Se permuta - House for Swap (Juan Carlos Tabío, 1984)
- El bohío - The Hut (Mario Rivas, 1985)
- De tal Pedro tal astilla (Luis Felipe Bernaza, 1985)
- Clandestinos - Clandestines (Fernando Pérez, 1987)
- Plaff - Too Afraid of Life or Splat (Juan Carlos Tabío, 1988)
- La bella del Alhambra - The Beauty of the Alhambra (Enrique Pineda Barnet, 1989)
- Strawberry and Chocolate - (Tomás Gutiérrez Alea and Juan Carlos Tabío, 1993)
- Madagascar - (Fernando Pérez, 1994)
- Guantanamera (Tomás Gutiérrez Alea and Juan Carlos Tabío, 1995)
- La Vida es Silbar - Life is a Whistle (Fernando Pérez, 1998)
- Lista de Espera - The Waiting List (Juan Carlos Tabío, 2000)
- Suite Habana - Havana Suite (Fernando Pérez, 2003)
- Habana Blues - Havana Blues (Benito Zambrano, 2005)
- El Benny - (Jorge Luis Sánchez, 2006)
- Los dioses rotos - Fallen Gods (Ernesto Daranas, 2008)
- Memories of Overdevelopment - Memorias del Desarrollo (Miguel Coyula, 2010)
- Conducta - Behavior (Ernesto Daranas, 2014)
- La obra del siglo (Carlos M. Quintela, 2015)
- El proyecto (Alejandro Alonso, 2017)
- Blue Heart (Miguel Coyula, 2021)
- Chronicles of the Absurd (Miguel Coyula, 2024)

== See also ==
- Media of Cuba
- Cinema of the Caribbean
- Cinema of the world
- Havana Film Festival
- Third Cinema
- World cinema
