= Herman Puig =

Cuban photographer (1928–2021)

Herman Puig (born German Puig Paredes; 25 February 1928 – 25 January 2021) was the founder of the first Cinemateca de Cuba and a pioneer of male nude photography. Born in Havana, Cuba, he began his career there and later gained fame in France. His heritage is Catalonian.

== Biography ==
=== Early years ===
He studied painting and sculpture in Cuba and filmed his first short, "Sarna," before moving to Paris at the age of 20 to study Audiovisual Techniques. In 1950, he worked with Henri Langlois, director and co-founder of the Cinémathèque Française. This collaboration led to the founding of the original Cinemateca de Cuba, officially established as an institution in 1948 by Herman Puig and Ricardo Vigón. The Cinemateca de Cuba was later revived in 1961 by Alfredo Guevara and the newly formed ICAIC, becoming today's Cuba Cinemateca.

Puig, along with Carlos Franqui, future ICAIC cameraman Ramón F. Suárez, and writers Edmundo Desnoes and Guillermo Cabrera Infante (author of Tres tristes tigres), produced several short films. Puig and Franqui collaborated on a short film, Carta de una madre (Letter to a Mother), and Puig and Edmundo Desnoes also made the short film Sarna (1952), which was produced and edited by cinematographer Ramón F. Suárez.

=== Cinema to Male Nude Photography ===
In October 1950, Puig traveled to Paris, where he met with Henri Langlois, the director of the Cinémathèque Française. Their brief but pivotal encounter led Langlois to agree to provide French films for the Cinema Club of Havana (the early Cinemateca de Cuba), on the condition that the club become an official institution. The Cinémathèque Française could only legally exchange films with similar institutions. Unforeseen political issues led to the closure of the Cinemateca a few months later, and it would not reopen until 1961. However, Puig's affinity for France and his place in Cuban cinema history were firmly established.

From the 1960s to the 1970s, Puig worked in advertising as a photographer and publicity filmmaker in Spain. In Madrid, he began experimenting with male nudes but was arrested in an alleged drug case and charged as a pornographer under the socialist government’s climate. He then moved to Paris to prove to Spain and the world that he was an artist, not a pornographer, and was met with almost universal acclaim. He later moved to Barcelona, where he resides to this day.

=== Modern Herman ===
Puig was the subject of a film by David Boisseaux-Chical, which explores his cultural exile from Cuba. In the film, Puig expresses his frustration at being associated with pornography and homosexuality simply for wanting to photograph male bodies as art, rather than focusing on women. Puig recently addressed issues of beauty, art, and expression restrictions in Cuba during a conference with author Zoé Valdés in Palma de Mallorca.

=== The Hidden Cinemateca ===
Puig often claimed to be the original founder of the Cinemateca de Cuba, alleging that the ICAIC, with the aim of promoting the narrative that Cuban cinema began with the ICAIC's creation in 1959, has obscured the true history. This political suppression of his and Ricardo Vigón's contributions has led to Puig's estrangement from the Cuban community. He frequently refrains from exhibiting his work in Cuba for fear of being perceived as a sympathizer of the Communist regime. In October 2009, El Ateneo de Madrid officially recognized him and Vigón as the founders of the Cinemateca de Cuba with a tribute to Herman Puig.

=== Death ===
Puig died on 25 January 2021, just one month shy of his 93rd birthday.
