= Pavel Giroud =

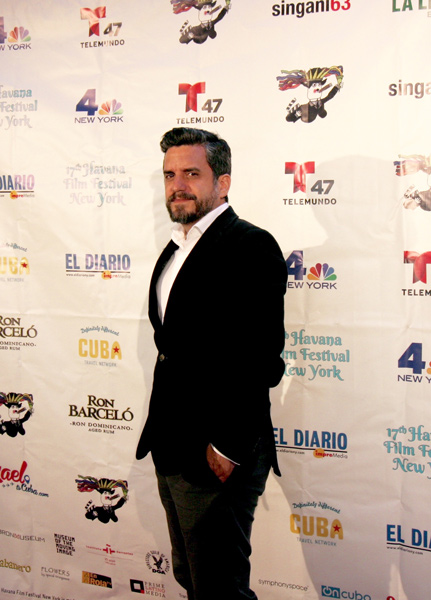
- Born: 1972 (age 53–54); Cuba
- Occupation: Film director

Pavel Giroud Eirea (born January 3, 1972) is a Cuban film director based in Madrid, Spain.

== Career ==
Giroud studied design and graduated from the Instituto Superior de Diseño (High Institute of Design) in 1994.

He worked for a short period of time as a designer and art director in films and theatre plays. He then began to paint, working with the basic techniques and incorporating video into his work, before directing his first short films, featuring his friends rather than professional actors. From then, Giroud decided to focus his career on cinema.

Giroud filmed only self-written scripts, until he read the script for the movie La Edad de la peseta, written by young screenwriter Arturo Infante. According to Giroud, he did not originally see any possibility in the script to express himself as a director, but he gradually fell in love with it, adding: "Now, I tell Arturo that it's my film not his, and that he should forget he wrote it." After the film was released in 2006, Howard Feinstein at Indiewire described Giroud as the "new Cuban Truffaut" and "the finest director of his generation". In 2020 the film was selected by Cuban Cinematheque as one of ten Best Cinematography and Best Production Design in 60 years of Cuban Cinema.

One year later he directed a noir film entitled Omerta, and began writing a more ambitious project, The Companion, which took more than six years to develop and secure financial support. The Hollywood Reporter called "stylistically more austere” that La Edad de la Peseta, describing it as "an uncertain hybrid of prison drama and boxing comeback yarn." It was selected as the Cuban entry for the Best Foreign Language Film at the 89th Academy Awards. While developing this film, he co-directed Playing Lecuona, a documentary film about Cuban musician Ernesto Lecuona, starring the jazz pianists Michel Camilo, Chucho Valdés and Gonzalo Rubalcaba.

From 2012 to 2019 he collaborated with the fine arts group Los Carpinteros, directing all of their films except one. After this group disbanded, Giroud continued working with one of it members, Dagoberto Rodríguez, directing three experimental videos: "Geometría Popular", released online by Sabrina Amrani Gallery in March 2020, "Semillas", with music by Joan Valent, and "A palo Limpio".

The Padilla affair, which won the Best Documentary Film award at the 10th Platino Awards, revolves around the self-confession of the poet Heberto Padilla - a historic event that had been hidden for more than half a century. The documentary was first released at the Telluride Film Festival, and subsequently presented at other festivals such as San Sebastián, Rome Film Festival, BAFICI. Critic Ruby Rich described the film as "beautifull and chilling, and as historical as it is contemporary".

His novel Habana Nostra was published in 2024 by the Traveler Publishing Group and launched simultaneously at events in Madrid and the Miami Book Fair.

In 2025 Giroud directed the German film Comandante Fritz. German critic Oliver Armknecht at Film-Rezensionen.de praised the film's blend of political comedy and romance, highlighting its production design and performances, but argued that the satire lacked sharpness and remained harmless. The film won the Audience Feature Film Award at the Miami Film Festival.

== Filmography ==
- 2025 Comandante Fritz - Feature Film.
- 2022 El Caso Padilla - Documentary Film.
- 2021 A palo Limpio - Short Film. Collaboration with artist Dagoberto Rodríguez.
- 2020 Semillas - Short Film. Collaboration with artist Dagoberto Rodríguez.
- 2020 Geometría Popular - Short Film. Collaboration with artist Dagoberto Rodríguez.
- 2019 Retráctil - Short Film. Collaboration with Los Carpinteros.
- 2016 El Acompañante (The Companion) - Feature film.
- 2015 Playing Lecuona - Documentary film.
- 2014 Polaris - Short film - Collaboration with Los Carpinteros.
- 2013 Pellejo - Short film - Collaboration with Los Carpinteros.
- 2012 Conga Irreversible - Collaboration with Los Carpinteros.
- 2008 Omertá - Feature Film.
- 2007 Manteca, Mondongo y Bacalao con pan - Documentary Film.
- 2006 La Edad de la peseta (The Silly Age) - Feature Film
- 2005 Frank Emilio, Amor y Piano - EPK
- 2005 Esther Borja: Rapsodia de Cuba - Documentary Film
- 2004 Tres Veces Dos - (Flash: One of three sections of the film) - Feature Film
- 2002 Todo por Ella - Short Film
- 2000 Manzanita.com - Short Film
- 1998 Rrring° - Short Film
