= Néstor Díaz de Villegas =

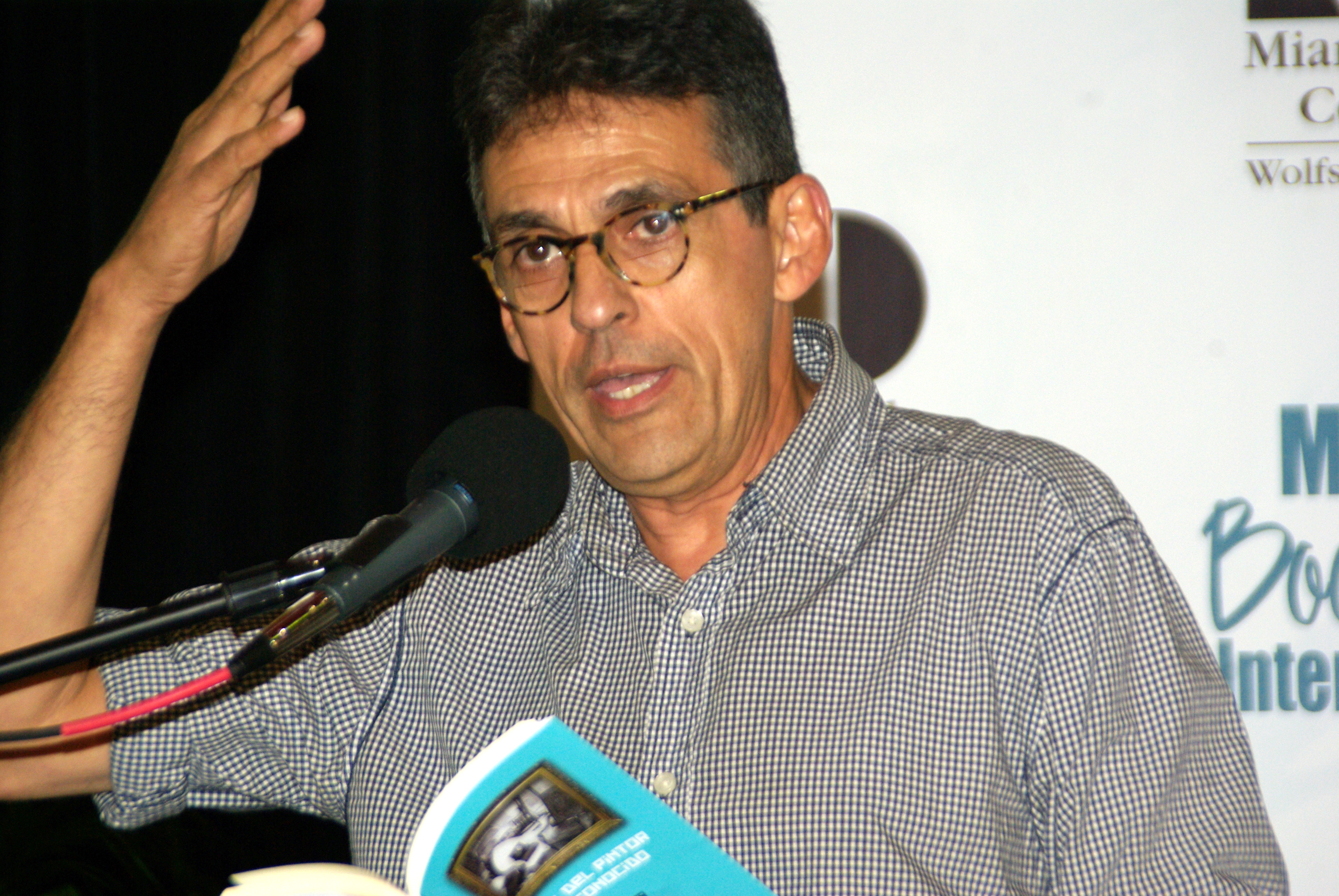
- Díaz de Villegas at the Miami Book Fair International in 2011
- Born: Néstor Díaz de Villegas; 1956 (age 69–70); Cumanayagua, Cienfuegos, Cuba
- Occupations: Poet, essayist, writer, film critic, editor, and translator

Néstor Díaz de Villegas (born 1956) is a Cuban poet, essayist, writer, film critic, editor, and translator. His work has been associated with Cuban exile literature and the literary culture that developed around the Mariel boatlift. His poetry has addressed exile, language, territory, urban space, and Cuban cultural identity.

== Biography ==
Díaz de Villegas was born in Cumanayagua, Cienfuegos, Cuba, in 1956. He was imprisoned in Cuba and went into exile in the United States in 1979. Díaz de Villegas became part of the literary and artistic milieu of Miami. A 1998 profile in Miami New Times described his activities as a poet in Miami and discussed the publication of Vicio de Miami and Anarquía en Disneylandia in 1997. Between 1991 and 1994 he worked as a nightlife reporter for El Nuevo Herald and as a writer for TV y Novelas. In 2023, artist Coco Fusco directed The Eternal Night a film based on Díaz de Villegas' years as a political prisoner in Cuba.

== Literary work ==
Díaz de Villegas's work includes poetry, essays, prose, chronicles, translations, and film criticism. His writing has appeared in publications including Mariel, Linden Lane, Sugar Mule, Lateral, Lichtungen, Devir, Zunái, Letras Libres, and Scientific American.

His early poetry collections include Canto de preparación (1982), Vida Nueva (1984), and La edad de piedra (1992).

Later, his poetry collections of the 1990s include Vicio de Miami (1997), Anarquía en Disneylandia (1997), and Confesiones del estrangulador de Flagler Street (1998).

Vicio de Miami and Confesiones del estrangulador de Flagler Street have received particular attention in discussions of Díaz de Villegas's poetry. The academic researcher Pacelli Dias Alves de Sousa examined the two collections in relation to exile, language, territory, and the cultural experience of Cuban displacement in the United States following the Mariel crisis. The city of Miami occupies an important place in Vicio de Miami. Carlos Espinosa Domínguez discussed the collection's treatment of Miami while also emphasizing its broader concerns with death, existence, time, and poetic creation.

Por el camino de Sade / Sade's Way was published in 2003 as a bilingual collection of sonnets centered on the Marquis de Sade.

Cuna del pintor desconocido, published by Aduana Vieja in 2011, contains 93 poems divided into seven sections.

Che en Miami was published by Aduana Vieja in 2012. In a review in Revista Otra Parte, Pablo Baler described the book as a long poem that reimagines the historical figure of Che Guevara through Miami, popular culture, and a mixture of literary forms.

His poetry was collected in Buscar la lengua. Poesía reunida 1975–2015, published in Leiden in 2015. The volume brought together poetry from several stages of his career, including Vicio de Miami, Confesiones del estrangulador de Flagler Street, Por el camino de Sade, Cuna del pintor desconocido, and Palavras à tribo / Palabras a la tribu.

Later publications include Poemas inmorales (2022). A 2023 essay by Pablo Baler in Rialta discussed the collection as an articulation of Díaz de Villegas's poetics, emphasizing fragmentation, formal experimentation, and the relationship between language and meaning.

Díaz de Villegas has also published essays and chronicles. His books include Cubano, demasiado cubano (2015) and De donde son los gusanos: Crónica de un regreso a Cuba luego de 37 años de exilio (2019). De donde son los gusanos records his return to Cuba after 37 years of exile. A review by Daniel Fernández in El Nuevo Herald described the book as a work concerned with memory, the experience of returning to Cuba, and the author's personal response to the country he had left decades earlier.

== Film criticism ==
Díaz de Villegas has written extensively about cinema. His film criticism has appeared in Cubaencuentro and Diario de Cuba, Rialta and Hypermedia Magazine, among other publications. They were collected in Para matar a Robin Hood, published by Hypermedia in 2017. and were later collected in Para matar a Robin Hood, published by Hypermedia in 2017. The publication of Para matar a Robin Hood received critical attention. Gilberto Padilla Cárdenas described the book as a collection of Díaz de Villegas's film writings and discussed its combination of film criticism and essayistic prose.

== Editorial work ==
Díaz de Villegas was the editor of Cubista Magazine, an online literary and cultural magazine published between 2004 and 2006. The magazine was produced from Los Angeles and published five issues both in Spanish and English between 2004 and 2006. It included essays, fiction, poetry, interviews, and criticism by Cuban writers and artists living both inside and outside Cuba. Academic research on Cuban diaspora publishing has also included Cubista Magazine among the publications that contributed to the development of Cuban literary culture outside the island.

== Critical reception ==
Carlos Espinosa Domínguez described his poetry as combining literary tradition with formal experimentation. In his discussion of Vicio de Miami, Espinosa Domínguez emphasized the importance of Miami while also identifying broader philosophical and literary concerns in the collection. Andrés Reynaldo's review of Cuna del pintor desconocido focused on its 93 poems and seven-part structure and emphasized the organization and formal variety of the collection. Academic research has situated Díaz de Villegas's poetry within discussions of Cuban exile literature. Alves de Sousa's study examines the relationship between exile, language, territory, and poetic form, particularly in Vicio de Miami and Confesiones del estrangulador de Flagler Street. Pablo Baler's discussion of Che en Miami interpreted the poem as a reworking of the historical figure of Che Guevara through Miami and popular culture, while also emphasizing its mixture of genres and its treatment of exile and language. More recently, Baler's 2023 essay on Poemas inmorales characterized the collection as a highly experimental work concerned with the instability of meaning, fragmentation, and the limits of communication.

== Selected bibliography ==
=== Poetry ===
- Canto de preparación (1982)
- Vida Nueva (1984)
- La edad de piedra (1992)
- Vicio de Miami (1997)
- Anarquía en Disneylandia (1997)
- Confesiones del estrangulador de Flagler Street (1998)
- Por el camino de Sade / Sade's Way (2003)
- Cuna del pintor desconocido (2011)
- Che en Miami (2012)
- Palavras à tribo / Palabras a la tribu (2014)
- Buscar la lengua. Poesía reunida 1975–2015 (2015)
- Poemas inmorales (2022)

=== Essays and prose ===
- Cubano, demasiado cubano (2015)
- De donde son los gusanos (2019)

=== Film criticism ===
- Para matar a Robin Hood (2017)

== See also ==
- Cuban literature
- Cuban exile
- Mariel boatlift
