= Blue Heart (film) =

2021 Cuban Sci-fi film

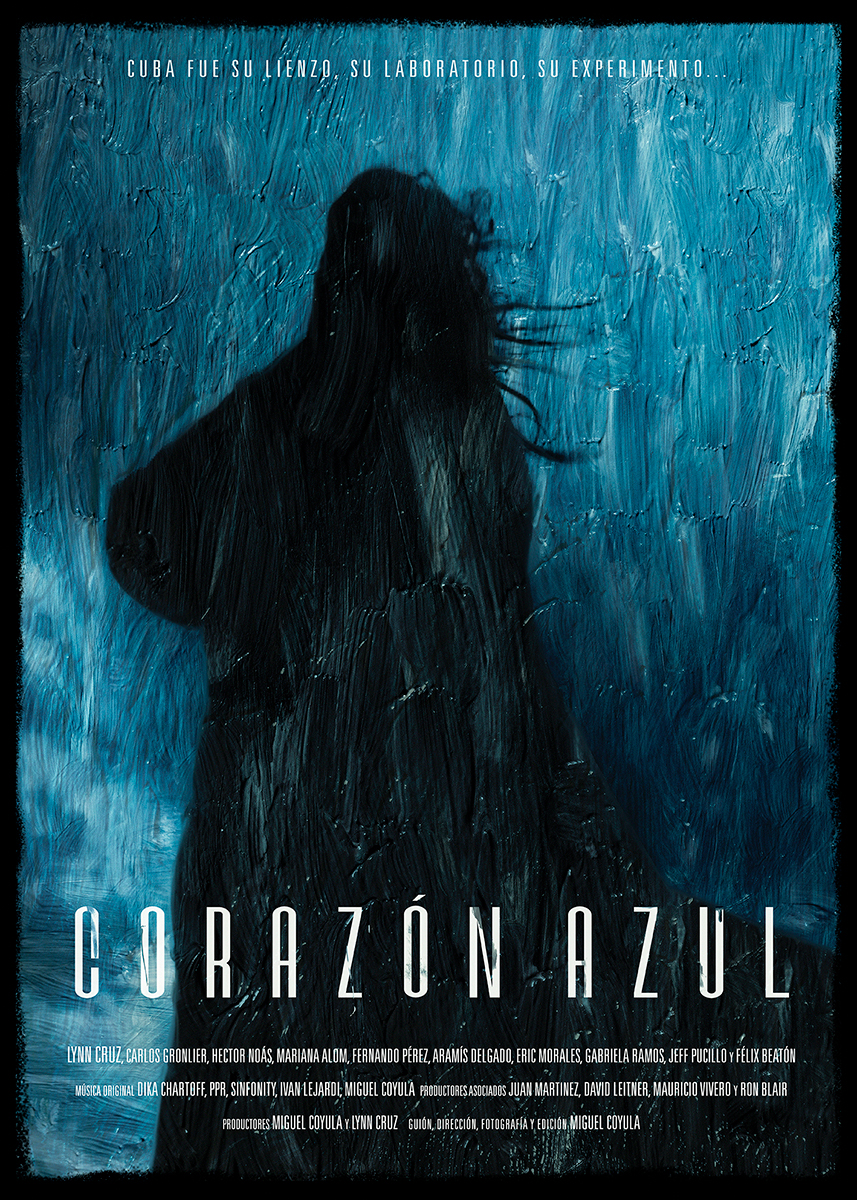
- Directed by: Miguel Coyula
- Written by: Miguel Coyula
- Produced by: Miguel Coyula, Lynn Cruz
- Starring: Lynn Cruz, Carlos Gronlier, Héctor Noas, Mariana Alom, Aramis Delgado, Fernando Pérez
- Cinematography: Miguel Coyula
- Edited by: Miguel Coyula
- Music by: Dika Chartoff, Ivan Lejardi, Miguel Coyula
- Release date: 2021
- Running time: 143 minutes
- Country: Cuba
- Languages: Spanish, English, Japanese, Russian, Chinese

Blue Heart (Spanish: Corazón azul) is a 2021 Cuban independent science fiction film written and directed by Miguel Coyula, starring Lynn Cruz, Carlos Gronlier and Héctor Noas. The film premiered at the 2021 Moscow International Film Festival, where it was nominated for the Golden St. George. Director of programming Kirill Razlogov described it as "the most transgressive and irreverent film of the competition".

== Plot ==
The story takes place in an alternative history thematically connected to Coyula’s 2003 debut feature Red Cockroaches. In this alternative reality, Fidel Castro oversees a genetic engineering program to create the New Man (utopian concept) to save the Cuban Revolution. The experiment produces highly dangerous and unstable individuals. They form a terrorist group that threatens to destroy the society responsible for their creation. They also become the target of a United States invasion led by Donald Trump. Elena, one of the anarchists, sets out to discover her origins.

== Production ==
The film was shot in chronological order without filming permits over ten years, beginning in 2011 during the Occupy Wall Street protests. After raising more than US$5,000 through Indiegogo, the funds were frozen by OFAC in connection with the United States embargo against Cuba. After a planned screening of Coyula's documentary Nadie was prevented by a police raid in 2017, Coyula and Cruz faced professional isolation and pressure. Several collaborators and actors, including Héctor Noas, left the production of Blue Heart for various reasons, including political concerns, emigration, and other personal priorities, prompting repeated revisions of the screenplay. CBC featured Coyula’s clandestine filmmaking process in its “Interrupt This Program: Havana” segment, which showed his use of digital composites to combine footage of multiple locations. In January 2020, photographer Javier Caso was questioned by Cuban State Security after taking photographs on the set of Blue Heart. The agents questioned his relationships with Coyula and Cruz, suggesting that they might be working for the CIA. Caso recorded the exchange on a concealed cellphone. Coyula added visuals and posted it online. The decade-long production was documented in Lynn Cruz's book Crónica azul: 10 años de rodaje. It was also the subject of Coyula's documentary Chronicles of the Absurd.

== Critical reception ==
Russian critic Marina Kopylova discussed the film's poetic qualities and visual style in Kino Press, writing that "the creators of Blue Heart open the doors and give us time to listen to them from within a difficult silence", comparing the experience to watching Stalker. Film historian Paulo Antônio de Paranaguá praised its combination of avant-garde and genre filmmaking in Rialta, describing it as "one of the most exciting revelations of the 21st century". Patricia Boero of The Film Verdict described it as "a complex, cryptic, compelling film" which “lingers in the mind as you continue to decipher its codes long after the screening has ended". French scholar Nelly Rajaonarivelo highlighted the film’s formal and conceptual emphasis on genetic and image manipulation, describing it as a work in which "the manipulated image—reinterpreted, transformed, and re-signified—is both the film’s material and its subject of reflection, making the film at once a mirror of that process and a critical examination of it”. Critic Michael Chanan discussed the film’s elliptical narrative and its characters as embodiments of impersonal forces. He wrote that "It is not their private fantasies that are phantasmagoric, but the film itself”, concluding that “rather than project it all back on Cuba, the dystopia evoked in Corazón azul is all around us, and everywhere the state depends on mythical figures and is responsible for our collective paranoia.” In Cineaste, film critic Matthew David Roe described the film as "the culminating point of Miguel Coyula’s artistic growth," arguing that "it stands as his most visceral experience."

== Controversy ==
Observatorio de derechos culturales published a chronological account of censorship instances the film has faced in Cuba.

Blue Heart was withdrawn from the main competition and placed in the Cinema of the Young section at the Minsk International Film Festival in Belarus. The International Cinema and Common Memory Festival in Nador (FICMEC) removed the film from its program shortly before the festival began. In both cases, Coyula said that festival organizers classified the film as pornography and asked him to cut two scenes, which he refused to do.

In 2023, the Miami Film Festival did not include Blue Heart in its program. Film critic Pablo Gamba wrote of this event: "Miguel Coyula has become the beacon for political discomfort. It’s an honor he owes not only to the cultural bureaucrats of Cuba, but also to those in Miami."

== Awards and nominations ==
=== Awards ===
Year	Award	Category	Festival
2021	Audacity Award	—	Minsk International Film Festival (LISTAPAD)
2021	Jorge Cámara Award, HFPA	Best Iberoamerican Narrative Film	Guadalajara International Film Festival
2022	Jury Mention	Narrative Feature	The Latino and Iberian Film Festival at Yale (LIFFY)

=== Nominations ===
Year	Nomination	Category	Festival
2021	Nominated for the Golden St. George Award	Narrative Feature	Moscow International Film Festival

== See also ==
- Cinema of Cuba
- List of films shot over three or more years
- List of avant-garde films of the 2020s
- List of science fiction films of the 2020s
