= Memories of Underdevelopment =

- Directed by: Tomás Gutiérrez Alea
- Written by: Edmundo Desnoes; Tomás Gutiérrez Alea
- Based on: Inconsolable Memories; 1965 novel by Edmundo Desnoes
- Produced by: Miguel Mendoza
- Starring: Sergio Corrieri; Daisy Granados
- Cinematography: Ramón F. Suárez
- Edited by: Nelson Rodríguez
- Music by: Leo Brouwer
- Distributed by: ICAIC
- Release date: 19 August 1968
- Running time: 97 minutes
- Country: Cuba
- Language: Spanish

Memories of Underdevelopment (Spanish: Memorias del Subdesarrollo) is a 1968 Cuban drama film directed and co-written by Tomás Gutiérrez Alea. The story is based on a novel by Edmundo Desnoes entitled Inconsolable Memories (Memorias del Subdesarrollo). It was Gutiérrez Alea's fifth film, and probably his most famous worldwide. The film gathered several awards at international film festivals. It is tied for the 169th best film of all time in the critics' ranking of the Sight & Sound 2022 poll. It was ranked by The New York Times as one of the 10 best films of 1968.

== Plot ==
Sergio Carmona Mendeyo, an idle bourgeois intellectual, lives in a penthouse in the FOCSA Building. An aspiring writer in his youth, he took over his family's furniture store before the Cuban Revolution, but has been subsisting on residual rental income since the store was expropriated. After his marriage with his wife, Laura, deteriorates, she flees to Miami with his parents. Considering himself apolitical—neither a revolutionary nor a counterrevolutionary—and resentful of the "underdeveloped" Cuban bourgeoisie, Sergio stays in Cuba.

Sergio seduces Elena, a working-class teenage aspiring actress and bolero singer, promising to use his connections in ICAIC to help her audition. He takes her to his apartment, where they have sex, and they strike up an affair. Sergio's attempts to educate Elena in high culture through visits to art galleries and writers' conferences fail, and instead make him increasingly pessimistic about the state of Cuban culture. Eventually, he cuts off contact with her, wandering through Havana and reminiscing on his youthful relationship with Hanna, who now lives in New York. These events are interspersed with documentary footage of the Bay of Pigs invasion, protests, and other political events.

Some time later, Elena's brother confronts him, accusing him of "ruining" his sister and reneging on a promise of marriage. Elena's parents try to force Sergio to marry her in order to regain her honor, but he refuses and they instead accuse him of rape. Sergio is acquitted, but is shaken by the episode and never sees her again. With the expropriation of Sergio's rental properties looming, he continues his gloomy wanderings as the October Crisis intensifies and the Cuban people mobilize.

== Cast ==
- Sergio Corrieri as Sergio Carmona Mendoyo, a bourgeois intellectual
- Daisy Granados as Elena, a teenaged girl fond of boleros
- Eslinda Núñez as Noemi
- Omar Valdés as Pablo
- René de la Cruz as Elena's brother
- Yolanda Farr as Laura
- Ofelia González as Hanna
- Edmundo Desnoes as himself / panelist
- René Depestre as himself / panelist
- Gianni Toti as himself / panelist
- David Viñas as himself / panelist
- Jack Gelber as himself

== Production details ==
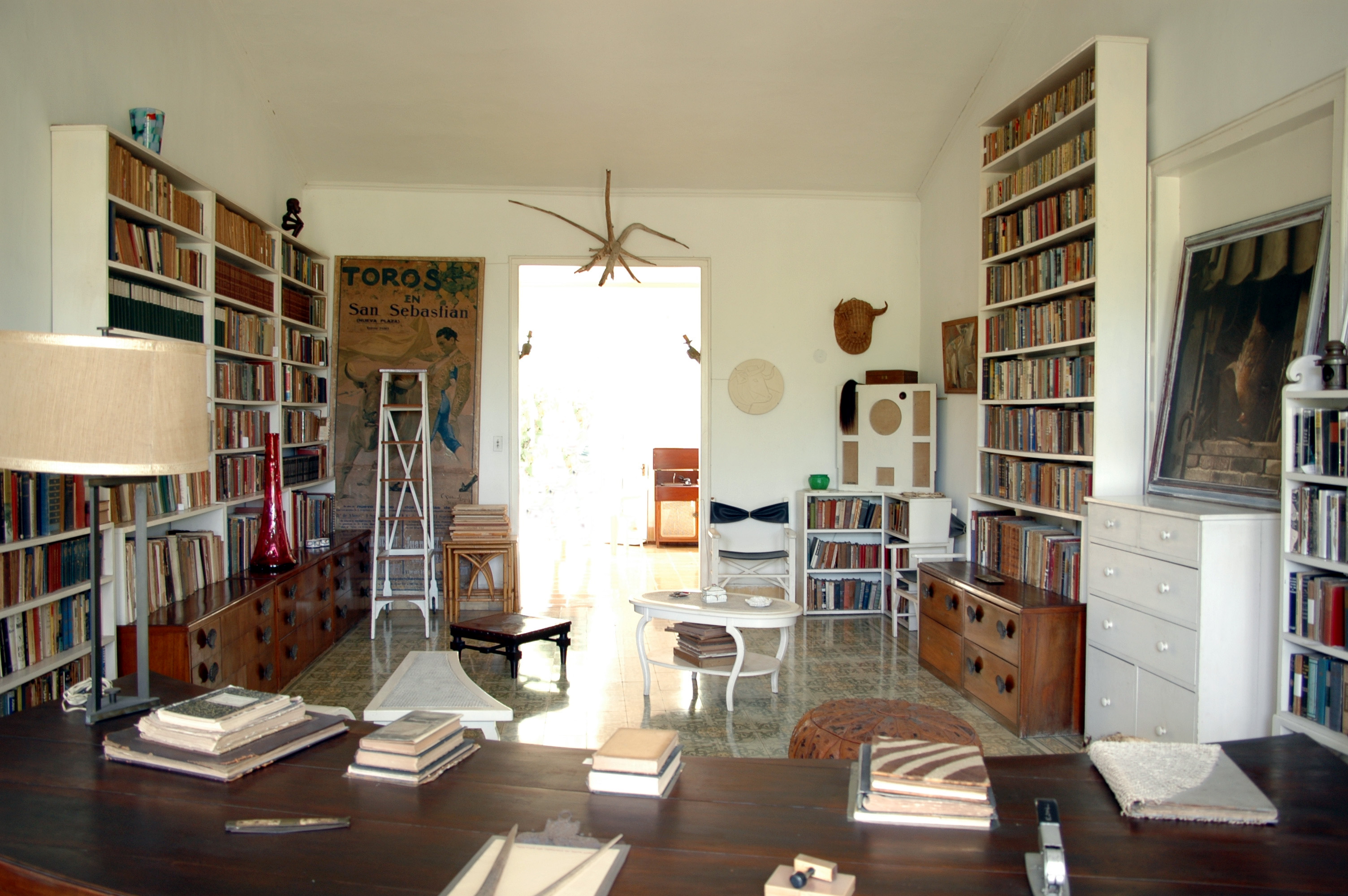
Sergio visits Finca Vigía, the Cuban home of Ernest Hemingway. While he reflects on Hemingway's attitude to Cuba, Elena is bored by "dead animals and books".

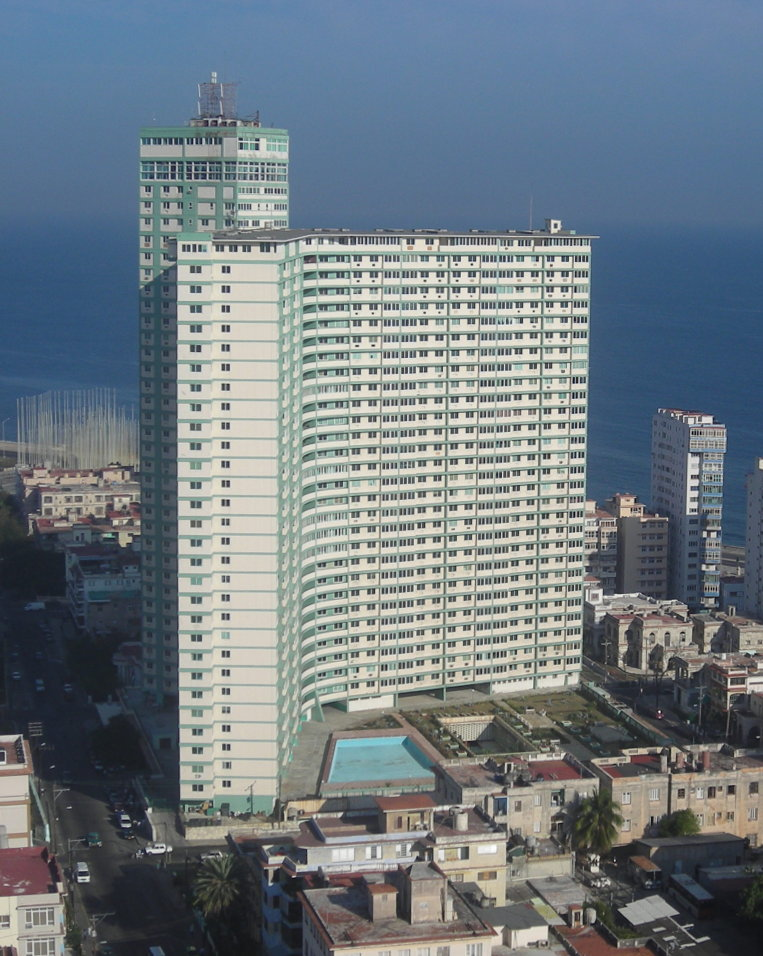
The apartment where Sergio lived was filmed in a thirty-fourth floor penthouse of the FOCSA Building

Before the film's release, both the director, Tomás Gutiérrez Alea, and the main actor, Sergio Corrieri, were concerned that the film wouldn't be successful. The film was largely inexpensive to produce, as it was made without many technological or economic resources, and as a result Gutiérrez Alea feared that his vision wouldn’t translate to the screen.

Another concern of Gutiérrez Alea's was that Corrieri would seem too young for his part. At the time of shooting in 1968 Corrieri was 28, yet the character was intended to be 38. Gutiérrez Alea and Corrieri worked together to capture the "different rhythm" that Corrieri needed to take on to play the part of someone 10 years his senior in a number of ways, including by dyeing Corrieri's hair grey.

Hanna, Sergio's long-lost love in the film, was intended to be a much larger character, but the actress that ended up being cast was not a professional, so the character's role was reduced.

Because of the political turmoil between the US and Cuba at the time, the US government denied Gutiérrez Alea a visitor's visa in 1970 when he attempted to enter the US to receive several awards he had won for Memories of Underdevelopment, using the Trading with the Enemy Act as justification. Sergio's apartment in the film was a penthouse in the FOCSA Building.

== Adaptation from novel to film ==
The film adaptation has generally been regarded as an improvement on the novel. In an interview in 1999, Sergio Corrieri was quoted stating, “I think that Memories is one of the few cases in which the film is better than the novel, because usually the opposite is the case. Almost always the cinematic version of a novel comes up short, but here the film transcended the novel.” Gutiérrez Alea explains in an interview with Cineaste in 1977 that at a certain point the novel “was to be betrayed, negated and transformed into something else” for it to be successful as a film. Gutiérrez Alea also comments that the author, Desnoes, was fully conscious of the fact that his book would be changed as it was made into a movie, and therefore he was able to keep a positive attitude. Desnoes ended up attending shooting sessions and making valuable suggestions. Desnoes commented that the film achieved a level of artistic success that the novel missed because Gutiérrez Alea “objectivized a world that was shapeless… and still abstract in the book” by adding “social density.” Desnoes appears himself as a panelist in a round table.

The film was poorly received by some critics because Sergio was an unconventional protagonist. The author of the novel, Edmundo Desnoes, writes of Sergio in Cine Cubano, “that is the tragedy of Sergio. His irony, his intelligence, is a defense mechanism which prevents him from being involved in the reality.”

== Reception ==
Widely acclaimed as one of the best films of its nation and of its era in terms of bringing together art and politics, and described by John King as 'the most interesting exploration of the problem in any cultural medium'. Because many Cubans already had a revolutionary mentality by the time the film was released, it was regarded more as a representation of an outdated stream of thought. Memories of Underdevelopment was popular in the United States. Many American critics were "suitably impressed by the film as a stylistic tour de force as well as a subtle and complex portrait of an uncommitted intellectual from a bourgeois background swept up in a vortex of revolutionary change and the threat of nuclear extinction at the time of the Cuban Missile Crisis." In an interview with Cineaste Magazine in 1977, Gutiérrez Alea is quoted saying that "Memories was in general much better understood and evaluated in the US because people perceived the attempt to criticize the bourgeois mentality."

On the review aggregator website Rotten Tomatoes, 96% of 27 critics' reviews are positive, with an average rating of 8.4/10.

The film was selected for screening as part of the Cannes Classics section at the 2016 Cannes Film Festival.

== See also ==
- Cinema of Cuba
