= Edmundo Desnoes =

Cuban writer (1930–2023)

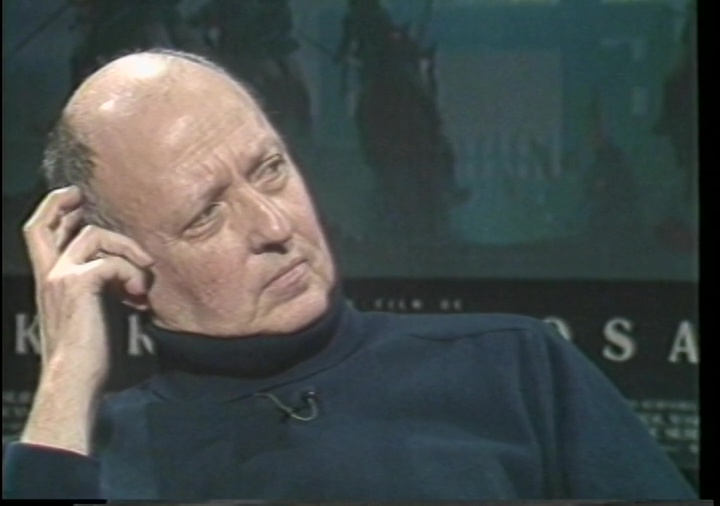
- Born: 2 October 1930 Havana, Cuba
- Died: December 7, 2023 (aged 93) New York, New York
- Occupation: Writer
- Language: Spanish

Edmundo Desnoes (2 October 1930 – 6 December 2023) was a Cuban writer and author of the novel Memorias del subdesarrollo (Memories of Underdevelopment), a complex story depicting the alienation of a Cuban bourgeois intellectual struggling to adapt to the process of the Revolution staying on the island after his family decides to leave the country. He originally called the work Inconsolable Memories in the first English edition, published in 1967 by the New American Library and which the author translated from the Spanish himself. The book was adapted in 1968 into the seminal Cuban film of the same title Memorias del Subdesarrollo (Memories of Underdevelopment) by the director Tomás Gutiérrez Alea, the name by which it is also known in English.

== Early life ==
Desnoes was born in Havana, Cuba to a Cuban Father and a white Jamaican mother. His mother was the decedent of French slave owners in Haiti who fled to Jamaica after the Haitian Revolution, his father the son of a man who was part of the Spanish-American War against Spain. He attended school in both Cuba, and the United States, and was fluent in both Spanish and English. At the age of 15 he met his future partner Felicia Rosshandler, though the two fell out of contact at age 17 and not meet again until they were 50.

== Cuban Writing Career ==
During the 1960s and 1970s, while living in Cuba, Desnoes wrote for the newspaper "La Revolucion" and was editor of art and literature for the Editorial Nacional de Cuba and El Instituto del Libro, and was a member of the editorial board of Casa de Las Americas, an advisor to the Empresa de películas y díapositives didáctics of the Ministry of Culture, and was also a professor of Cultural History at the Escuela de Diseño Industrial.

== In America ==
He lived in New York City from 1979 until his death. In 2007 he published Memorias del Desarrollo a follow-up to his original novel which was adapted by Miguel Coyula into the 2010 award-winning film Memories of Overdevelopment. He focused his writing on essays, short stories, art reviews, poetry, and many novels. Desnoes died in New York on 6 December 2023, at the age of 93.

== Writing ==
=== Novels ===
- Memorias del subdesarollo (1965), ISBN 978-84-376-4865-1
- Memorias del desarrollo (2007), ISBN 978-84-934967-6-0

=== Nonfiction ===
- Caribe: contra y desde (2024), ISBN 978-84-1136-063-0

=== Editor ===
- Los Dispositivos en la Flor: Cuba, literatura desde la Revolución (1981)

== See also ==
- Herman Puig
