= Antonia Eiriz =

Cuban painter (1929–1995)

Antonia Eiriz Vázquez
- Born: April 1, 1929; Havana, Cuba
- Died: March 9, 1995 (aged 65); Miami, Florida
- Known for: Painting
- Notable work: La Anunciación (1964), Una tribuna para la paz democratica (1968)
- Awards: National Culture Award (1981); Alejandro Carpentier Medal (1983)

Antonia Eiriz Vázquez (1929–1995) was an influential Cuban painter whose work was known for its Expressionist qualities and was exhibited throughout Latin America during her life.

== Life and career ==
She was born in Havana, Cuba in the neighborhood of Juanelo and was the youngest of six children. When she was young, she developed skills in sewing, knitting, and crafting. Eiriz also had polio when she was very young, and thus had to live with a disability for the rest of her life. She began her studies of fine arts at the Escuela Nacional de Bellas Artes "San Alejandro" in 1953. While there, she exhibited her work with artists that would become known as Los Once ("the group of eleven"), one of whom, Guido Llinás, would become a close friend and mentor. She also contributed illustrations to the magazine, Lunes, edited by Guillermo Cabrera Infante, which was a supplement of the newspaper, Revolución. Eiriz graduated from San Alejandro in 1957.

Eiriz continued to be active and influential force in the arts following the 1959 Cuban Revolution. In 1964, she held three solo shows (two in Cuba and one in Mexico), in which she would position herself as "one of the strongest voices in the art landscape of Cuba". That same year she would unveil one of her most known works, La Anunciación. In 1966 she would exhibit with Raúl Martínez at the Casa del Lago in Mexico's Autonomous National University, and the following year later at the 23rd Salon de Mai in Paris, France. Eiriz's career took a sharp turn by the end of the decade when her 1968 work Una tribuna para la paz democratica ("a platform for democratic peace") was deemed "defeatist" by the Cuban government, which effectively marked her as a dissident. She abruptly ceased painting that year and withdrew from many artistic circles, thereafter devoting her life and talents largely to Cuban crafts as well as teaching and mentoring emerging artists privately.

Eiriz attained permission from the Cuban government to move to the United States in 1993 as a result of her declining health due to depression. Upon arriving in the US she returned to painting and lived the final two years of her life in Miami, Florida. Eiriz had finished over 25 large oil format paintings before her death, one to mark each of the 25 years in which she had refrained from painting due to censorship. Eiriz died on March 9, 1995, of heart failure in Miami, Florida.

== Legacy and recognition ==
In 2001 Antonia's work was displayed in the National Museum of art in Cuba and can still be seen to this day. Eiriz received a National Culture Award in 1981, and in 1983 received the Alejo Carpentier Medal. In 1989 the Cuban government awarded her the Félix Varela Order; in 1994 she was the recipient of a Guggenheim Fellowship.

Eiriz's mentorships during her period of imposed retirement gave her a new level of influence over the younger generation of Cuban artists. A notable protégé of Eiriz from this period was Cuban Neoexpressionist Adriano Nicot who in interviews has described Eiriz as a major influence and "the greatest teacher of Cuban Expressionism."

Her paintings are prominently featured in the features of filmmaker Miguel Coyula.

Her work is included in the permanent collection of Museo Nacional de Bellas Artes in Havana and NSU Art Museum in Fort Lauderdale.

== Selected solo exhibitions ==
- 1964 Ensamblajes, Museo Nacional de Bellas Artes, Havana
- 1964 Pinturas y ensamblajes, Galería La Habana, Havana
- 1993 Antonia Eiriz se expone: Óleos sobre telas y tintas, Weiss Sori Gallery, Coral Gables, FL
- 1993 Barrett Art Center, Poughkeepsie, NY
- 1995 Antonia Eiriz: Tributo a una leyenda; Óleos, pinturas, tintas, grabados, Museum of Art, Fort Lauderdale, FL
