= Nicolás Guillén Landrián =

- Born: 1938; Camagüey, Cuba
- Died: July 23, 2003 (aged 64–65); Miami, Florida, United States
- Occupations: Film director; documentary filmmaker; painter
- Years active: 1962–2001
- Notable work: En un barrio viejo (1963); Ociel del Toa (1965); Coffea arábiga (1968)
- Relatives: Nicolás Guillén (uncle)

Nicolás Guillén Landrián (1938 in Camagüey, Cuba - July 23, 2003 in Miami, Florida) was a Cuban experimental filmmaker and painter.

Nicolás Guillén Landrián is regarded today as a key figure in Cuban cinema, whose irreverent and formally innovative documentaries made a fundamental contribution to the country's cinematic canon. His style is characterized by experimental montage, cinematic collage, intermedial contrasts, and an ironic deconstructive approach to documentary conventions. In contrast to the predominantly didactic and ideological discourse of revolutionary Cuban documentary, his films employ polyphony, irony, ambiguity and unconventional juxtapositions to expose social contradictions and foreground individual experience over the predominantly collective narratives.

He made a total of 18 documentaries (six are now lost), although they were heavily censored and prevented from being part of the Cuban film industry. In 1964, he was given a special award at the Krakow Film Festival for his film En un barrio viejo. In 1968, his documentary Coffea Arabiga featured the Beatles' song "The Fool on the Hill" as Fidel Castro appeared on screen. That same year, Guillén was accused of plotting to assassinate Castro. The Cuban government interrogated him for six months in Villa Marista. From 1970 to 1989, he was repeatedly jailed and institutionalized. He received at least eight treatments of electroconvulsive therapy.

As painter, he taught René Portocarrero and Victor Miquel Moreno Piñeiro in painting.

In 1989, he was able to leave Cuba and lived the rest of his life in Miami, Florida. He died of cancer at Mercy Hospital in Miami. After his death, his widow had his body flown from Miami and entombed in Colon Cemetery, Havana in Cuba. His uncle was Afro-Cuban poet Nicolás Guillén.

== Films about his work ==
In 2003, Manuel Zayas directed the film Café con Leche about Landrian’s life.

Filmmakers Victor R. Jiménez Sosa, and Jorge Egusquiza produced a biographical documentary of Nicolás Guillén Landrián in his own words, Nicolás: the end but not the end, by Coincident Productions (2005).

In 2014 Raydel Araoz and Julio Ramos directed "Retornar a La Habana con Guillén Landrián", a 35 min. documentary essay based on Ramos´extensive interview with Gretel Alfonso, Guillén Landrián's widow.

In 2023, filmmaker Ernesto Daranas directed the documentary Landrián, which explores the life and work of Nicolás Guillén Landrián, the restoration of his films, and the censorship he faced in Cuba; the film premiered at the 80th Venice International Film Festival in the Venice Classics section.

== Filmography ==
- Homenaje a Picasso (1962) (lost)
- Congos reales (1962) (lost)
- Patio arenero (1962) (lost)
- El morro (1963) (lost)
- En un barrio viejo (In an Old Neighborhood) (1963)
- Un festival (1963)
- Ociel del Toa (1965)
- Los del baile (Those of the Dance) (1965)
- Rita Montaner (1965) (lost)
- Retornar a Baracoa (To Return to Baracoa) (1966)
- Reportaje (1966)
- Coffea arábiga (1968)
- Expo Maquinaria Pabellón Cuba (1969) (lost)
- Desde la Habana, 1969 (1971)
- Taller de Línea y 18 (1971)
- Un reportaje sobre el Puerto Pesquero (1972)
- Nosotros en el Cuyaguateje (1972)
- Para construir una casa (1972)
