= Reverse Shot (magazine) =

- Editor: Michael Koresky; Jeff Reichert
- Categories: Film criticism
- Frequency: Online
- Founded: 2003
- Country: United States
- Language: English
- Website: reverseshot.org

Reverse Shot is an American film criticism magazine founded in 2003. It began as an independently produced print publication in New York City before moving exclusively online. Since September 2014, it has been published in partnership with the Museum of the Moving Image (MoMI), where it serves as the museum's publication for film criticism.

== History ==
Reverse Shot was founded in New York City in 2003 by Michael Koresky, Jeff Reichert, Neal Block, and Erik Syngle. Its first edition was a small, self-published print magazine distributed free of charge at film venues and other locations associated with film culture in New York. The publication initially appeared in print and later moved exclusively online. Its editors developed a format centered on film criticism around thematic "symposiums", in which several writers considered a common filmmaker, film, concept, or aspect of cinema from different perspectives. By its tenth anniversary, Reverse Shot had developed a quarterly online format based around its symposiums, alongside reviews, interviews, and other forms of film writing. In September 2014, Reverse Shot partnered with the Museum of the Moving Image and became the museum's publication for film criticism with Koresky and Reichert continuing as editors. The magazine has kept its extended critical writing as a dialogue between contemporary cinema and film history. Its tenth-anniversary retrospective in Film Comment described the symposium format as central to the magazine's development and noted that its contributors had grown from emerging voices in New York film criticism into participants in established film culture.

== Museum of the Moving Image ==
Since 2014, Reverse Shot has been the publication for film criticism of the Museum of the Moving Image. The museum describes it as providing "a different angle on moving images—past, present, and future" and identifies its symposiums as one of its principal recurring forms. The Museum of the Moving Image marked Reverse Shot's tenth anniversary in 2013 with The Life of Film: Celebrating a Decade of Reverse Shot, a program of screenings and discussions featuring the publication's editors and contributors. For the publication's twentieth anniversary in 2023, the museum presented Reverse Shot at 20: Selections from a Century, a screening series featuring films selected by contributors. The anniversary was also marked by the publication of Reverse Shot: Twenty Years of Film Criticism in Four Movements, an anthology edited by Koresky and Reichert.

== Reception ==
By its tenth anniversary, Reverse Shot had more than 30 contributors and had developed a readership within contemporary film criticism. Film Comment described it as a pioneering online film journal and emphasized the development of its contributors within the broader culture of film criticism. In 2018, David Hudson of the Criterion Collection described Reverse Shot as "one of the most respected online film publications" and noted that it had begun as a print magazine before becoming an online publication. In a 2024 review of the twentieth-anniversary anthology, Tony McKibin at Senses of Cinema characterized Reverse Shot as a hybrid between film reviewing and academic essay, emphasizing its space for extended critical reflection.
