= Dean Luis Reyes =

Dean Luis Reyes (born 1972) is a Cuban film critic, essayist, journalist, and professor. His work focuses on Cuban cinema, documentary film, and 21st century independent Cuban cinema. He is the author of several books on cinema and has taught at the Escuela Internacional de Cine y Televisión (EICTV) in Cuba.

== Biography ==
Dean Luis Reyes was born in Trinidad, Sancti Spíritus Province, Cuba, in 1972. He graduated in journalism from the University of Havana in 1996. Since the late-1990s, he has worked as a journalist and cultural critic for Cuban media outlets, including newspapers, radio, television, and cultural magazines. He has contributed to La Gaceta de Cuba, Juventud Rebelde and Cine Cubano and his writings have appeared in specialized publications and anthologies in Cuba and abroad. Between 2004 and 2010, Reyes worked at the Escuela Internacional de Cine y Televisión (EICTV) in San Antonio de los Baños. He initially served as editor of the digital magazine Miradas and subsequently worked as a professor and coordinator of the school's Humanities Chair. Since 2011, he has worked independently and in 2015 he emigrated to Spain. He has also taught as at Chavón School of Design in the Dominican Republic.

== Work ==
Reyes has written extensively on Cuban cinema, documentary film, animation, and film criticism with emphasis on new media.

His first book, Contra el documento, was published by Editorial Cauce in 2005. In 2010, he published La mirada bajo asedio. El documental reflexivo cubano through Editorial Oriente in Santiago de Cuba. The book examines Cuban documentary filmmaking and devotes particular attention to the work of filmmaker Nicolás Guillén Landrián. La mirada bajo asedio has subsequently been cited in academic research on Cuban documentary film. In 2014, Reyes published La forma realizada. El cine de animación with Ediciones ICAIC. In 2016, he published Werner Herzog: la búsqueda de la verdad extática, published in Buenos Aires by Diseño Editorial. In 2020, he published El gobierno de mañana: La invención del cine cubano independiente (2001–2015), published by Rialta Ediciones. The book brings together essays written over approximately fifteen years of observation of Cuban audiovisual production and examines the emergence and development of independent Cuban cinema.

== Independent Cuban cinema ==
The analysis of independent Cuban cinema is a major focus of Reyes's critical work. His writings examine audiovisual production outside traditional production structures and its relationship with the Instituto Cubano del Arte e Industria Cinematográficos (ICAIC) and Cuban cultural institutions. In El gobierno de mañana, Reyes brings together critical texts written during the emergence of new forms of audiovisual production and circulation in Cuba. The book examines works ranging from Video de familia (2001), by Humberto Padrón, to La obra del siglo (2015), by Carlos M. Quintela, as well as other feature-length and short fiction, documentary, and animated films. Diario de Cuba published an interview with Reyes on the occasion of the publication of El gobierno de mañana and discussed his career in journalism and film criticism.

== Nicolás Guillén Landrián ==
The work of Cuban filmmaker Nicolás Guillén Landrián is an important subject in Reyes's critical writing. La mirada bajo asedio includes an extended study of the filmmaker and his work. Reyes's research on Guillén Landrián has subsequently been cited in academic studies of Cuban documentary film.

== International activity ==
Reyes has participated as a film critic, professor, lecturer, and juror in international film and cultural programs.

The International Federation of Film Critics (FIPRESCI) records his participation as a member of the jury at the 31st International Festival of New Latin American Cinema in Havana in 2009. He has also participated in film programs at the Centre de Cultura Contemporània de Barcelona (CCCB). The institution's annual reports document Reyes's participation in its film programming, including events connected with contemporary Cuban cinema.

== Editorial activity ==
Reyes has contributed to cultural and specialized publications in Cuba and abroad. His writings include essays, criticism, and interviews on cinema. He is a contributor to Rialta Magazine, where he publishes essays, reviews, and interviews about cinema. He is also a contributor of Fantasma Material

== Awards ==
Reyes has received the Caracol Award of the Unión de Escritores y Artistas de Cuba for audiovisual criticism and essay. He has also received the Rubén Martínez Villena National Cultural Journalism Award.

== Bibliography ==
- Reyes, Dean Luis (2005). Contra el documento. Pinar del Río: Editorial Cauce.
- Reyes, Dean Luis (2010). La mirada bajo asedio: El documental reflexivo cubano. Santiago de Cuba: Editorial Oriente.
- Reyes, Dean Luis (2014). La forma realizada: El cine de animación. Havana: Ediciones ICAIC.
- Reyes, Dean Luis (2016). Werner Herzog: la búsqueda de la verdad extática. Buenos Aires: Diseño Editorial. ISBN 978-987-4000-69-9.
- Reyes, Dean Luis (2020). El gobierno de mañana: La invención del cine cubano independiente (2001–2015). Mexico: Rialta Ediciones. ISBN 978-607-98518-9-7.
