= Red Cockroaches =

- Theatrical release poster
- Directed by: Miguel Coyula
- Written by: Miguel Coyula
- Produced by: Miguel Coyula
- Starring: Adam Plotch; Talia Rubel; Jeff Pucillo; Diane Spodarek
- Music by: Miguel Coyula
- Distributed by: Vinegar Syndrome (US); Herectic Films (US)
- Release date: 25 October 2003 (Cuba)
- Running time: 82 minutes
- Countries: Cuba; United States
- Language: English
- Budget: $2,000

Red Cockroaches (Spanish: Cucarachas Rojas) is a 2003 Cuban–American science fiction drama film written, directed and produced by Miguel Coyula in his feature debut. Produced over a two-year period on a reported budget of $2,000, the film was shot on consumer digital video and edited on a home computer. It has frequently been cited as an example of early 21st-century DIY and micro-budget digital cinema.

The film is the first installment in a thematic trilogy continued by Blue Heart (2021).

== Plot ==
A young man meets a mysterious young woman in the New York City subway and becomes romantically involved with her, only to later discover that she may in fact be his long-lost sister. Their relationship unfolds in an alternative version of New York City marked by environmental decay, including bouts of acid rain, and dominated by a powerful cloning corporation known as DNA21. As the story progresses, questions of identity, memory, and genetic determinism blur the boundaries between romance, science fiction, and psychological drama.

== Production ==
According to an interview with actress Lynn Cruz published in Rialta, Coyula spent two years completing the film using a consumer-grade digital camera and non-professional actors, including Adam Plotch and Talia Rubel. The film was shot primarily in New York City without permits.

=== Visual style ===
The film was storyboarded extensively prior to shooting. Rather than adhering to conventional continuity editing, each cut moves to a new camera setup, avoiding repeated angles within a scene. Critics have noted that this approach creates a stylized, graphic quality reminiscent of manga storytelling.

Instead of attempting to make digital video resemble celluloid film, Coyula digitally manipulated color saturation and contrast to create a heightened, often expressionistic atmosphere. Multiple-layer compositing techniques were used to construct the dystopian cityscape and environmental effects, contributing to the film’s distinctive visual identity.

== Reception ==
=== Critical response ===
Critical reception to Red Cockroaches was mixed to positive, with reviewers frequently commenting on its visual ambition and resourcefulness given its extremely low budget.

Ronnie Scheib of Variety described the film as “a triumph of technology in the hands of a visionary with know-how,” praising its inventive use of digital tools.

Barry Meyer of Film Monthly observed that the film’s scene transitions and editing style create an effect similar to that of a pop-up book, emphasizing its graphic and layered compositions.

A review published by Cine Latinoamericano compared the film’s dystopian New York setting to the work of Philip K. Dick and to Mamoru Oshii’s animated film Ghost in the Shell, citing its philosophical science-fiction elements and urban futurism.

On review aggregation website Rotten Tomatoes, the film holds an overall approval rating based on published reviews. Commentators have generally highlighted the film’s ambition and stylistic boldness, while some have criticized its opaque narrative structure and uneven performances. The film has developed a modest cult following within independent and experimental film circles.

=== Festival reception ===
The film circulated widely in international festivals devoted to independent and genre cinema, where it received multiple awards and special mentions (see below). Its festival success contributed to its later home-video release in the United States.

== Awards ==
According to the Internet Movie Database, the film received multiple festival awards and nominations. These include:

- GreenCine Online Film Festival (US, June 2005): Narrative Grand Prize
- San Francisco Fearless Tales (US, April 2005): Best Editing
- Festival Buenos Aires Rojo Sangre (Argentina, November 2004): Special Mention for Visual Concept
- SciencePlusFiction (Italy, November 2004): Special Mention
- Festival Cineplaza (Cuba, October 2004): Gran Premio Plaza; Best Director; Best Editing; Best Sound
- Microcinema Fest (US, July 2004): Best of Fest; Best Director; Best Science Fiction Feature; Best Actor; Best Editing; Best FX
- Encuentro Nacional de Video (Cuba, June 2004): Best Editing; Special Mention (Narrative); Best Cinematography
- Digital Independent Film Festival (DIFF) (US, May 2004): Grand Jury Prize
- Muestra de Nuevos Realizadores (Cuba, February 2004): Special Award of the Jury
- Festival Almacén de la Imagen (Cuba, October 2003): Best Feature; Best Editing; Cinema Award

== See also ==
- List of Cuban films
