= Cinéaste (magazine) =

American film magazine

- Frequency: Quarterly
- Publisher: Cineaste Publishers
- Founder: Gary Crowdus
- Founded: 1967
- First issue: Summer 1967
- Country: United States
- Based in: New York City
- Website: www.cineaste.com
- ISSN: 0009-7004

Cinéaste is an American quarterly film magazine that was established in 1967.

== History and profile ==
The first issue of Cinéaste was published in Summer 1967. The launching company was Cineaste Publishers, Inc. The founder and editor-in-chief is Gary Crowdus. It is published quarterly. Cineaste publishes reviews, in-depth analyses and interviews with actors, filmmakers etc. The magazine is independently operated from New York City with no financial ties to any film studios or academic institutions. Publication of the magazine is, however, made possible, in part, with public funds from the New York State Council on the Arts, a State Agency, and the National Endowment for the Arts.

== Politics ==
The journal Jump Cut cited the magazine as contributing to left politics in the United States. The Jump Cut editors wrote: "Cinéaste has provided information and analysis unavailable elsewhere, and by so doing it has helped build a stronger left film culture in the U.S. Specifically, Cinéaste has focused attention on independent left filmmaking, on third world films, and on progressive examples of mainstream film. It has also provided a political analysis of those films, raising criticism within a left context and thereby generating and continuing the political dialogue essential to advancing political film work." Richard Armstrong of Bright Lights Film Journal wrote, "Cineaste has always shown a commitment to films made by women and people of colour."

== See also ==
- List of film periodicals
