= Rialta =

Cultural magazine

- Rialta, Alianza Iberoamericana para la Literatura, las Artes y el Pensamiento
- Founded: 2017
- Founder: Carlos Aníbal Alonso
- Type: Cultural and media organization
- Headquarters: Querétaro, Mexico
- Website: https://rialta.org/

Rialta is a Cuban editorial and cultural organization based in Mexico and founded by editor Carlos Aníbal Alonso. It publishes the online magazine Rialta magazine, books through Rialta Ediciones, and digital archival material relating to Cuban cultural history. The project developed from a literary publishing initiative into a broader media and cultural organization encompassing publishing, journalism, archival projects, and cultural events.

== History ==
Rialta emerged from an editorial project related to Cuban literature. According to Alonso, the project's first book, a Spanish-language edition of Lord Dunsany's Los dioses de Pegana, published in December 2016, while the first issue of its magazine appeared in March 2017. The project subsequently expanded into book publishing, cultural journalism, and the creation of a digital repository of publications and documents related to Cuban and Latin American cultural history. In 2020, Rialta participated in international initiatives related to freedom of expression and Cuba's Decree-Laws 370 and 349. In 2021, it was among the independent media outlets that signed an international statement concerning freedom of expression and the right of assembly in Cuba. Freedom House identifies it as one of the projects belonging to Cuba's "digital diaspora", consisting of sites operated from abroad which cover events in Cuba. The same report lists Rialta among the independent digital media outlets blocked in Cuba. The project´s was subsequently in 2023 described by Diario de Cuba in the context of independent Cuban publishing and media. Alonso participated in a discussion on the situation of independent Cuban publishers alongside representatives of other Cuban publishing cultural projects. Rialta has also been involved in collective initiatives concerning freedom of expression. In July 2021, it was among Cuban non-government media that signed a statement calling the Cuban government o respect freedom of expression and the right of assembly.

== Rialta magazine ==
Rialta magazine is the digital magazine associated with the project which started in 2017. The International Standard Serial Number International Centre registers the publication under ISSN 2594-1550, as an online publication from Mexico. The publication is registered by the ISSN International Centre under ISSN 2594-1550, with Mexico recorded as its country of publication. The magazine publishes essays, art and film criticism, interviews, fiction, poetry, translations, cultural news and other material related to Cuban and Ibero-American culture.

== Rialta Ediciones ==
Rialta Ediciones is the publishing imprint associated with the project. Its publishing activity predates the magazine: the project's first book was Los dioses de Pegana by Lord Dunsany, published in December 2016. The catalog of Rialta Ediciones includes literature, essays, art, poetry, theater, and other works related to the humanities. Among its publications is El cuerpo nunca olvida: trabajo forzado, hombre nuevo y memoria en Cuba (1959-1980) by Abel Sierra Madero, published by Rialta Ediciones in 2022. In 2024, Rialta Ediciones published Fuera de Lugar / Out of Place: Voces de la literatura iberoamericana, an anthology associated with the Festival de Literatura Iberoamericana de Providence, organized by the Department of Hispanic Studies at Brown University. Among its editorial projects is Fantasma Material, an annual publication devoted to film developed in collaboration with the Instituto de Artivismo Hannah Arendt (INSTAR). The first issue appeared in 2024, with Rialta Ediciones participating in the publication's editorial coordination, copyediting, and design.

== Archivo Rialta ==
The Archivo Rialta is devoted to the digital preservation and dissemination of publications and documents related to Cuban cultural history. The archive contains files and materials related to periodicals and other documents from different periods of Cuban cultural history. Among the publications documented are Orígenes, Mariel, and Albur. These materials also appear in external bibliographic projects. AméricaLee, a platform of the Center for Documentation and Research on the Culture of the Left (CeDInCI), includes references to materials preserved and documented by Rialta in its records of Cuban cultural publications.

== Cultural activities ==
Rialta has also participated in cultural and academic projects and events. In 2024, it co-organized the En Zona festival in Mexico City together with the Metropolitan Autonomous University and El Estornudo.

== See also ==
- Cuban literature
- Cuban Cinema
- Culture of Cuba
- Cuban exile
