= Neustadt International Prize for Literature =

American literary award

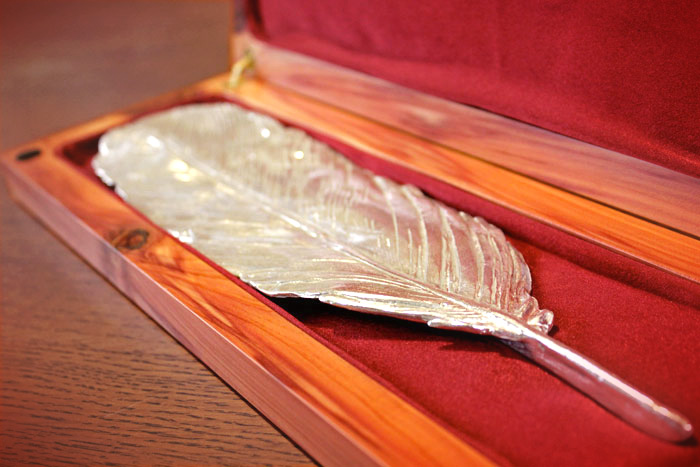
- The Neustadt Prize Feather
- Country: United States
- Presented by: University of Oklahoma, World Literature Today
- Reward: $50,000
- First award: 1970
- Website: www.neustadtprize.org

The Neustadt International Prize for Literature is a biennial award for literature sponsored by the University of Oklahoma and its international literary publication, World Literature Today.

It is considered one of the more prestigious international literary prizes, often compared with the Nobel Prize in Literature. The New York Times called the prize “The Oklahoma Nobel” in 1982, and the prize is sometimes referred to as the “American Nobel”. Since it was founded in 1970, some 30 of its laureates, candidates, or jurors have also been awarded Nobel Prizes. Like the Nobel, it is awarded to individuals for their entire body of work, not for a single one.

== History ==
The Neustadt International Prize for Literature was established as the Books Abroad International Prize for Literature in 1969 by Ivar Ivask, editor of Books Abroad. It was subsequently renamed the Books Abroad/Neustadt Prize. It was renamed again, this time to Neustadt International Prize for Literature, in 1976.

== Award ==
The Prize is a silver eagle feather, a certificate, and $50,000 USD. The award was endowed by Walter and Doris Neustadt of Ardmore, Oklahoma to ensure the award in perpetuity.

The charter of the Neustadt Prize stipulates that the award be given in recognition of outstanding achievement in poetry, fiction, or drama and that it be conferred solely on the basis of literary merit. Any living author writing in any language is eligible, provided only that at least a representative portion of his or her work is available in English, the language used during the jury deliberations. The prize may serve to crown a lifetime's achievement or to direct attention to an important body of work that is still developing. The prize is not open to application.

== Selection ==
Candidates are selected by a jury of at least seven members. Selection is not limited by geographic area, language or genre.

The Neustadt International Prize for Literature is the only international literary award of this scope developed in the United States. It is one of few international prizes for which poets, novelists and playwrights alike are equally eligible.

== List of Neustadt Laureates, Finalists and Jurors ==
Year	Finalist	Country	Nominating Juror	Country
1970	Giuseppe Ungaretti (1888–1970)	Italy	Piero Bigongiari (1914–1997)	Italy
1970	Conrad Aiken (1889–1973)	United States	Allen Tate (1899–1979)	United States
1970	John Berryman (1914–1972)	United States	A. K. Ramanujan (1929–1993)	India; United States
1970	Jorge Luis Borges (1899–1986)	Argentina	Mario Vargas Llosa (1936–2025)	Peru
1970	Edward Brathwaite (1930–2020)	Barbados	J. P. Clark (1935–2020)	Nigeria
1970	Hans Magnus Enzensberger (1929–2022)	Germany	Heinrich Böll (1917–1985)	Germany
1970	Graham Greene (1904–1991)	England	Frank Kermode (1919–2010)	England
1970	Jorge Guillén (1893–1984)	Spain	Juan Marichal (1922–2010)	Spain
1970	Zbigniew Herbert (1924–1998)	Poland	Jan Kott (1914–2001)	Poland
1970	Pierre-Jean Jouve (1887–1976)	France	Claude Pichois (1925–2004)	France
1970	Pablo Neruda (1904–1973)	Chile	Alfonso Calderón (1930–2009)	Chile
1970	Francis Ponge (1899–1988)	France	Gaëtan Picon (1915–1976)	France
1970	Alexander Solzhenitsyn (1918–2008)	Soviet Union	Andrei Voznesensky (1933–2010)	Soviet Union
1972	Gabriel García Márquez (1927–2014)	Colombia	Thor Vilhjálmsson (1925–2011)	Iceland
1972	Zbigniew Herbert (1924–1998)	Poland	François Bondy (1915–2003)	Switzerland
1972	Vasko Popa (1922–1991)	Serbia	T. Carmi (1925–1994)	United States; Israel
1972	Claude Simon (1913–2005)	France	Odysseus Elytis (1911–1996)	Greece
1972	Harold Pinter (1930–2008)	England	Jovan Hristić (1933–2002)	Serbia
1972	Paavo Haavikko (1931–2008)	Finland	Kai Laitinen (1924–2013)	Finland
1972	Birago Diop (1906–1989)	Senegal	Camara Laye (1928–1980)	Guinea
1972	Nathalie Sarraute (1900–1999)	France	Věra Linhartová (1938–)	Czechoslovakia
1972	Czesław Miłosz (1911–2004)	Poland/United States	Kenneth Rexroth (1905–1982)	United States
1972	Octavio Paz (1914–1998)	Mexico	Fernand Verhesen (1913–2009)	Belgium
1974	Francis Ponge (1899–1988)	France	Michel Butor (1926–2016)	France
1974	Wole Soyinka (1934–)	Nigeria	Chinua Achebe (1930–2013)	Nigeria
1974	Georges Schéhadé (1905–1989)	Lebanon; France	Adonis (1930–)	Syria
1974	Ian Hamilton Finlay (1925–2006)	Scotland	Ernst Jandl (1925–2000)	Austria
1974	Gyula Illyés (1902–1983)	Hungary	Ferenc Karinthy (1921–1992)	Hungary
1974	Eyvind Johnson (1900–1976)	Sweden	Olof Lagercrantz (1911–2002)	Sweden
1974	Zaharia Stancu (1902–1974)	Romania	George Dem Loghin (1919–?)	Romania
1974	Allen Tate (1899–1979)	United States	Mario Luzi (1914–2005)	Italy
1974	Doris Lessing (1919–2013)	England; Zimbabwe	Joyce Carol Oates (1938–)	United States
1974	Henri Michaux (1899–1984)	Belgium/France	Andri Peer (1921–1985)	Switzerland
1974	Anna Seghers (1900–1983)	Germany	John Willett (1917–2002)	England
1976	Elizabeth Bishop (1911–1979)	United States	John Ashbery (1927–2017)	United States
1976	Elizabeth Bishop (1911–1979)	United States	Marie-Claire Blais (1939–2021)	Canada
1976	Yannis Ritsos (1909–1990)	Greece	Melih Cevdet Anday (1915–2002)	Turkey
1976	Anaïs Nin (1903–1977)	France; United States	Agustí Bartra (1908–1982)	Spain
1976	Bert Schierbeek (1918–1996)	Netherlands	H. C. ten Berge (1938–)	Netherlands
1976	Andrei Voznesensky (1933–2010)	Soviet Union	Paal Brekke (1923–1993)	Norway
1976	Wole Soyinka (1934–)	Nigeria	Dennis Brutus (1924–2009)	South Africa
1976	Tawfiq al-Hakim (1898–1987)	Egypt	Mohammed Dib (1920–2003)	Algeria
1976	Czesław Miłosz (1911–2004)	Poland; United States	Zbigniew Herbert (1924–1998)	Poland
1976	Robert Lowell (1917–1977)	United States	Thomas Kinsella (1928–2021)	Ireland
1976	Tadeusz Rózewicz (1921–2014)	Poland	Günter Kunert (1929–2019)	Germany
1978	Czesław Miłosz (1911–2004)	Poland; United States	Joseph Brodsky (1940–1996)	Soviet Union; United States
1978	Anthony Powell (1905–2000)	England	Tuomas Anhava (1927–2001)	Finland
1978	Nadezhda Mandelstam (1899–1980)	Soviet Union	Thorkild Bjørnvig (1918–2004)	Denmark
1978	Carlos Drummond de Andrade (1902–1987)	Brazil	Antonio Candido (1918–2017)	Brazil
1978	Zbigniew Herbert (1924–1998)	Poland	Walter Helmut Fritz (1929–2010)	Germany
1978	János Pilinszky (1921–1981)	Hungary	Ágnes Gergely (1933–)	Hungary
1978	Elias Canetti (1905–1994)	Bulgaria; England	Wolfgang Kraus (1924–1998)	Austria
1978	Graham Greene (1904–1991)	England	R. K. Narayan (1906–2001)	India
1978	Eudora Welty (1909–2001)	United States	William Jay Smith (1918–2015)	United States
1978	V. S. Naipaul (1932–2018)	Trinidad and Tobago; England	Derek Walcott (1930–2017)	Saint Lucia
1978	Georges Schéhadé (1905–1989)	Lebanon; France	Andrée Chedid (1920–2011)	Egypt; France
1980	Josef Škvorecký (1924–2012)	Czechia; Canada	Arnošt Lustig (1926–2011)	Czechia
1980	Alberto de Lacerda (1928–2007)	Portugal	Luis Amorim de Sousa (1937–)	Portugal
1980	Breyten Breytenbach (1939–2024)	South Africa	André Brink (1935–2015)	South Africa
1980	Yves Bonnefoy (1923–2016)	France	Claude Esteban (1935–2006)	France
1980	Günter Grass (1927–2015)	Germany	Thomas Keneally (1935–)	Australia
1980	Kim Chi-ha (1941–2022)	South Korea	Yōtarō Konaka (1934–2024)	Japan
1980	Kim Chi-ha (1941–2022)	South Korea	Muriel Rukeyser (1913–1980)	United States
1980	Mulk Raj Anand (1905–2004)	India	Shiv K. Kumar (1921–2017)	India
1980	Miroslav Krleža (1893–1981)	Croatia	Vasa Mihailovich (1926–2015)	Serbia
1980	Yannis Ritsos (1909–1990)	Greece	George Savidis (1929–1995)	Greece
1980	Norman MacCaig (1910–1996)	Scotland	Alexander Scott (1920–1989)	Scotland
1982	Octavio Paz (1914–1998)	Mexico	Manuel Durán Gili (1925–2020)	Spain; United States
1982	Ted Hughes (1930–1998)	England	Yehuda Amichai (1924–2000)	Israel
1982	Laura Riding (1901–1991)	United States	Poul Borum (1934–1996)	Denmark
1982	Robert Penn Warren (1905–1989)	United States	John Lackey Brown (1914–2002)	United States
1982	Vladimir Voinovich (1932–2018)	Soviet Union	Efim Etkind (1918–1999)	Soviet Union; France
1982	Max Frisch (1911–1991)	Switzerland	Francine du Plessix Gray (1930–2019)	United States
1982	Eugène Guillevic (1907–1997)	France	Mimmo Morina (1933–2005)	Italy; Luxembourg
1982	Ba Jin (1904–2005)	China	Hualing Nieh Engle (1925–2024)	China; United States
1982	Artur Lundkvist (1906–1991)	Sweden	Östen Sjöstrand (1925–2006)	Sweden
1982	Leonardo Sciascia (1921–1989)	Italy	Giancarlo Vigorelli (1913–2005)	Italy
1984	Paavo Haavikko (1931–2008)	Finland	Bo Carpelan (1926–2011)	Finland
1984	Zbigniew Herbert (1924–1998)	Poland	Stanisław Barańczak (1946–2014)	Poland; United States
1984	Jorge Amado (1912–2001)	Brazil	Mouloud Mammeri (1917–1989)	Algeria
1984	Howard Brenton (1942–)	England	Kamala Markandaya (1924–2004)	India; England
1984	Christopher Logue (1926–2011)	England	N. Scott Momaday (1934–2024)	United States
1984	Sándor Weöres (1913–1989)	Hungary	Ottó Orbán (1936–2002)	Hungary
1984	Ernesto Sábato (1911–2011)	Argentina	Édouard Roditi (1910–1992)	United States; France
1984	Mohammed Dib (1920–2003)	Algeria	Eric Sellin (1933–)	United States
1984	Donald Davie (1922–1995)	England	Charles Tomlinson (1927–2015)	England
1984	Jorge Luis Borges (1899–1986)	Argentina	Luisa Valenzuela (1938–)	Argentina
1984	Manès Sperber (1905–1984)	Austria; France	Elie Wiesel (1928–2016)	Romania; United States
1986	Max Frisch (1911–1991)	Switzerland	Adolf Muschg (1934–)	Switzerland
1986	Wole Soyinka (1934–)	Nigeria	Maya Angelou (1928–2014)	United States
1986	Francisco Ayala (1906–2009)	Spain	José Luis Cano (1911–1999)	Spain
1986	Primo Levi (1919–1987)	Italy	Margherita Guidacci (1921–1992)	Italy
1986	Kenzaburō Ōe (1935–2023)	Japan	Shūichi Katō (1919–2008)	Japan
1986	Jorge Luis Borges (1899–1986)	Argentina	Sigurur Magnússon (1928–2017)	Iceland
1986	Günter Grass (1927–2015)	Germany	Gregory Rabassa (1922–2016)	United States
1986	Yves Bonnefoy (1923–2016)	France	Anthony Rudolf (1942–)	England
1986	Eugène Ionesco (1909–1994)	Romania; France	Iordan Chimet (1924–2006)	Romania
1986	Mavis Gallant (1922–2014)	Canada; France	Mordecai Richler (1931–2001)	Canada
1988	Raja Rao (1908–2006)	India; United States	Edwin Thumboo (1933–)	Singapore
1988	Ghérasim Luca (1913–1994)	Romania/France	Andrei Codrescu (1946–)	Romania; United States
1988	Stanisław Lem (1921–2006)	Poland	Lars Gustafsson (1936–2016)	Sweden
1988	René Char (1907–1988)	France	Raymond Jean (1925–2012)	France
1988	Milan Kundera (1929–2023)	Czechia; France	Algirdas Landsbergis (1924–2004)	Lithuania; United States
1988	Léopold Sédar Senghor (1906–2001)	Senegal	Jean-Luc Moreau (1937–)	France
1988	João Cabral de Melo Neto (1920–1999)	Brazil	Nélida Piñon (1937–2022)	Brazil
1988	Peter Handke (1942–)	Austria	Julian Schutting (1937–)	Austria
1988	Roy Fisher (1930–2017)	England	Jon Silkin (1930–1997)	England
1988	Nadine Gordimer (1923–2014)	South Africa	Susan Sontag (1933–2004)	United States
1988	Paule Marshall (1929–2019)	United States	George Lamming (1927–2022)	Barbados
1990	Tomas Tranströmer (1931–2015)	Sweden	Jaan Kaplinski (1941–2021)	Estonia
1990	Östen Sjöstrand (1925–2006)	Sweden	Homero Aridjis (1940–)	Mexico
1990	Mohammed Dib (1920–2003)	Algeria	Assia Djebar (1936–2015)	Algeria
1990	Rolf Jacobsen (1907–1994)	Norway	Knut Faldbakken (1941–)	Norway
1990	Mavis Gallant (1922–2014)	Canada; France	Robert Pinget (1919–1997)	Switzerland; France
1990	Yordan Radichkov (1929–2004)	Bulgaria	Vera Gancheva (1943–2020)	Bulgaria
1990	György Konrád (1933–2019)	Hungary	George Gömöri (1934–)	Hungary; England
1990	Michel Leiris (1901–1990)	France	Richard Howard (1929–2022)	United States
1990	V. S. Naipaul (1932–2018)	Trinidad and Tobago; England	Sam Selvon (1923–1994)	Trinidad and Tobago; England
1990	Vasko Popa (1922–1991)	Serbia	Lasse Söderberg (1931–)	Sweden
1990	Dai Houying (1938–1996)	China	Xiao Qian (1910–1999)	China
1992	João Cabral de Melo Neto (1920–1999)	Brazil	Silviano Santiago (1936–)	Brazil
1992	Habib Tengour (1947–)	Algeria; France	Etel Adnan (1925–2021)	Lebanon; United States
1992	Bella Akhmadulina (1937–2010)	Russia	Vasily Aksyonov (1932–2009)	Russia; United States
1992	Christopher Middleton (1926–2015)	England	Zulfikar Ghose (1935–2022)	Pakistan; United States
1992	Orhan Pamuk (1952–)	Turkey	Güneli Gün (1939–)	Turkey; United States
1992	Henri Meschonnic (1932–2009)	France	V. Y. Mudimbe (1941–2025)	Democratic Republic of the Congo
1992	Kenzaburō Ōe (1935–2023)	Japan	Makoto Ōoka (1931–2017)	Japan
1992	Andrea Zanzotto (1921–2011)	Italy	Sergio Perosa (1933–)	Italy
1992	Eduardo Galeano (1940–2015)	Uruguay	Elena Poniatowska (1932–)	Mexico
1992	John Berger (1926–2017)	England	Alastair Reid (1926–2014)	Scotland
1992	A. B. Yehoshua (1936–2022)	Israel	Anton Shammas (1950–)	Palestine
1994	Kamau Brathwaite (1930–2020)	Barbados	Kofi Awoonor (1935–2013)	Ghana
1994	Svetlana Alexievich (1948–)	Belarus	Zoya Boguslavskaya (1924–2026)	Russia
1994	Norman Mailer (1923–2007)	United States	Alan Cheuse (1940–2015)	United States
1994	Zbigniew Herbert (1924–1998)	Poland	J. M. Coetzee (1940–)	South Africa
1994	Toni Morrison (1931–2019)	United States	Nuruddin Farah (1945–)	Somalia
1994	Chinua Achebe (1930–2013)	Nigeria	Wlad Godzich (1945–)	France; United States
1994	Miguel Delibes (1920–2010)	Spain	Ángel González Muñiz (1925–2008)	Spain
1994	Mahasveta Devi (1926–2016)	India	Githa Hariharan (1954–)	India
1994	Costas Montis (1914–2004)	Cyprus	Hellē Paionidou (1940–)	Cyprus
1994	Mohamed Choukri (1935–2003)	Morocco	Nawal El Saadawi (1931–2021)	Egypt
1994	Seamus Heaney (1939–2013)	Ireland	Chris Wallace-Crabbe (1934–2025)	Australia
1996	Assia Djebar (1936–2015)	Algeria; France	Barbara Frischmuth (1941–2025)	Austria
1996	Vassilis Vassilikos (1933–2023)	Greece	Yiorgos Chouliaras (1951–)	Greece; United States
1996	Vizma Belševica (1931–2005)	Latvia	Desmond Egan (1936–)	Ireland
1996	Nirmal Verma (1929–2005)	India	Álfrún Gunnlaugsdóttir (1938–2021)	Iceland
1996	Randolph Stow (1935–2010)	Australia	Alamgir Hashmi (1951–)	Pakistan; England
1996	Rafael Alberti (1902–1999)	Spain	Carlos Rojas Vila (1928–2020)	Spain
1996	Werner Lambersy (1941–2021)	Belgium	Albert Russo (1943–)	Belgium
1996	Tahar Ben Jelloun (1944–)	Morocco	Hanan al-Shaykh (1945–)	Lebanon
1996	Carlos Fuentes (1928–2012)	Mexico	Mario Valdés (1934–2020)	Mexico; United States
1996	Bei Dao (1949–)	China; United States	Eliot Weinberger (1949–)	United States
1998	Nuruddin Farah (1945–)	Somalia	Ngũgĩ wa Thiong'o (1938–2025)	Kenya
1998	Adrienne Rich (1929–2012)	United States	Meena Alexander (1951–2018)	India; United States
1998	R. S. Thomas (1931–2000)	Wales	Richard Exner (1929–2008)	Germany; United States
1998	Mo Yan (1955–)	China	Howard Goldblatt (1939–)	United States
1998	Les Murray (1938–2019)	Australia	Janette Turner Hospital (1942–)	Australia
1998	Doris Lessing (1919–2013)	England; Zimbabwe	Shirley Geok-lin Lim (1944–)	Malaysia; United States
1998	Philip Roth (1933–2018)	United States	Norman Manea (1936–)	Romania; United States
1998	Franck Étienne (1936–2025)	Haiti	Raphaël Confiant (1951–)	Martinique
1998	Ernesto Cardenal (1925–2020)	Nicaragua	Roberto Fernández Retamar (1930–2019)	Cuba
1998	John Ashbery (1927–2017)	United States	Carolyn Forché (1950–)	United States
2000	David Malouf (1934–2026)	Australia	Ihab Hassan (1925–2015)	Egypt; United States
2000	Wilson Harris (1921–2018)	Guyana	Cyril Dabydeen (1945–)	Guyana; Canada
2000	V. S. Naipaul (1932–2018)	Trinidad and Tobago; England	Ha Jin (1956–)	China; United States
2000	V. S. Naipaul (1932–2018)	Trinidad and Tobago; England	Mervyn Morris (1937–)	Jamaica
2000	N. Scott Momaday (1934–2024)	United States	Linda Hogan (1947–)	United States
2000	Juan Goytisolo (1931–2017)	Spain	Helen Lane (1921–2004)	United States
2000	Augusto Monterroso (1921–2003)	Honduras; Guatemala	Carlos Monsiváis (1938–2010)	Mexico
2000	Femi Osofisan (1946–)	Nigeria	Tanure Ojaide (1948–)	Nigeria
2000	Mirkka Rekola (1931–2014)	Finland	Kirsti Simonsuuri (1945–2019)	Finland
2000	György Konrád (1933–2019)	Hungary	Dubravka Ugrešić (1949–2023)	Croatia; Netherlands
2002	Alvaro Mutis (1923–2013)	Colombia	Juan Gustavo Cobo Borda (1948–2022)	Colombia
2002	Andrée Chedid (1920–2011)	Egypt; France	Evelyne Accad (1943–)	Lebanon; United States
2002	António Lobo Antunes (1942–2026)	Portugal	Kwame Anthony Appiah (1954–)	England; Ghana
2002	Wilson Harris (1921–2018)	Guyana	Lorna Goodison (1947–)	Jamaica
2002	Eduardo Galeano (1940–2015)	Uruguay	Thomas King (1943–)	Canada
2002	Janet Frame (1924–2004)	New Zealand	Bill Manhire (1946–)	New Zealand
2002	Homero Aridjis (1940–)	Mexico	Rainer Schulte (1937–)	Germany; United States
2002	Luis Fernando Verissimo (1936–2025)	Brazil	Moacyr Scliar (1937–2011)	Brazil
2002	Peter Matthiessen (1927–2014)	United States	Barry Unsworth (1930–2012)	England
2002	Mavis Gallant (1922–2014)	Canada; France	Jane Urquhart (1949–)	Canada
2004	Adam Zagajewski (1945–2021)	Poland	Bogdana Carpenter (1941–)	Poland; United States
2004	Dương Thu Hương (1947–)	Vietnam	Esther Allen (1962–)	United States
2004	Gary Snyder (1930–)	United States	Bei Dao (1949–)	China; United States
2004	J. M. Coetzee (1940–)	South Africa	Kristjana Gunnars (1948–)	Iceland; Canada
2004	J. M. Coetzee (1940–)	South Africa	Abdulrazak Gurnah (1948–)	Tanzania
2004	Chinua Achebe (1930–2013)	Nigeria	Gabriel Okara (1921–2019)	Nigeria
2004	Mario Vargas Llosa (1936–2025)	Peru	Edmundo Paz Soldán (1967–)	Bolivia
2004	José Saramago (1922–2010)	Portugal	Leon Rooke (1934–)	Canada
2004	Marjorie Agosín (1955–2025)	Chile; United States	Bapsi Sidhwa (1938–2024)	Pakistan
2006	Claribel Alegría (1924–2018)	Nicaragua; El Salvador	Daisy Zamora (1950–)	Nicaragua
2006	Orhan Pamuk (1952–)	Turkey	Aron Aij (–)	Turkey
2006	Alice Munro (1931–2024)	Canada	Clark Blaise (1940–)	United States; Canada
2006	Alice Munro (1931–2024)	Canada	Linda Spalding (1943–)	Canada
2006	Linton Kwesi Johnson (1952–)	Jamaica	Kwame Dawes (1962–)	Ghana; Jamaica
2006	Gerald Stern (1925–2022)	United States	Li-Young Lee (1957–)	Indonesia; United States
2006	André Brink (1935–2015)	South Africa	Zakes Mda (1948–)	South Africa
2006	Per Olov Enquist (1934–2020)	Sweden	Tina Nunnally (1952–)	United States
2006	Philip Roth (1933–2018)	United States	Nico Orengo (1944–2009)	Italy
2006	N. Scott Momaday (1934–2024)	United States	Carter Revard (1931–2022)	United States
2006	Hélène Cixous (1937–)	Algeria; France	Susan Rubin Suleiman (1939–)	Hungary; United States
2008	Patricia Grace (1937–)	New Zealand	Joy Harjo (1951–)	United States
2008	Ngugi wa Thiong'o (1938–2025)	Kenya	Chris Abani (1966–)	Nigeria; United States
2008	Saadi Youssef (1934–2021)	Iraq	Sinan Antoon (1967–)	Iraq
2008	Michael Ondaatje (1943–)	Sri Lanka; Canada	Rilla Askew (1951–)	United States
2008	Jacques Roubaud (1932–2024)	France	Marcel Bénabou (1939–)	Morocco; France
2008	Katerina Anghelaki-Rooke (1939–2020)	Greece	Peter Constantine (1963–)	England; United States
2008	Tsering Woeser (1966–)	China	Huang Xiang (1941–)	China
2008	Haruki Murakami (1949–)	Japan	Christine Montalbetti (1965–)	France
2008	E. L. Doctorow (1931–2015)	United States	Bharati Mukherjee (1940–2017)	India; United States
2008	Yoel Hoffmann (1937–2023)	Israel	Yoko Tawada (1960–)	Japan; Germany
2010	Duo Duo (1951–)	China	Mai Mang (1967–)	China; USA
2010	Ha Jin (1956–)	China; United States	Sefi Atta (1964–)	Nigeria; United States
2010	Ricardo Piglia (1941–2017)	Argentina	Horacio Castellanos Moya (1957–)	El Salvador
2010	Michael Ondaatje (1943–)	Sri Lanka; Canada	Aleksandar Hemon (1964–)	Bosnia and Herzegovina; United States
2010	Haruki Murakami (1949–)	Japan	Etgar Keret (1967–)	Israel
2010	Margaret Atwood (1939–)	Canada	Joanne Leedom-Ackerman (1947–)	United States
2010	A. B. Yehoshua (1936–2022)	Israel	Claire Messud (1966–)	United States
2010	Athol Fugard (1932–2025)	South Africa	Pireeni Sundaralingam (–)	Sri Lanka; England
2010	E. L. Doctorow (1931–2015)	United States	Bharati Mukherjee (1940–2017)	United States; Canada
2010	Shahriar Mandanipour (1957–)	Iran	Niloufar Talebi (–)	Iran; England
2012	Rohinton Mistry (1952–)	India; Canada	Samrat Upadhyay (1964–)	Nepal; United States
2012	Aleksandar Hemon (1964–)	Bosnia and Herzegovina; United States	Rabih Alameddine (1959–)	Lebanon; United States
2012	Zoë Wicomb (1948–2025)	South Africa; Scotland	Gabeba Baderoon (1969–)	South Africa; United States
2012	Elena Poniatowska (1932–)	Mexico	Norma Elia Cantú (1947–)	Mexico; United States
2012	Bob Dylan (1941–)	United States	Andrea De Carlo (1952–)	Italy
2012	Diamela Eltit (1949–)	Chile	Nathalie Handal (1969–)	France; United States
2012	Vénus Khoury-Ghata (1937–2026)	Lebanon; France	Ilya Kaminsky (1977–)	Ukraine; United States
2012	John Banville (1945–)	Ireland	Yahia Lababidi (1973–)	Egypt; Lebanon
2012	Tahar Ben Jelloun (1944–)	Morocco	Miguel Syjuco (1976–)	Philippines
2014	Mia Couto (1955–)	Mozambique	Gabriella Ghermandi (1965–)	Ethiopia; Italy
2014	César Aira (1949–)	Argentina	Cristina Rivera Garza (1964–)	Mexico
2014	Dương Thu Hương (1947–)	Vietnam	Andrew Lam (1964–)	Vietnam; United States
2014	Edward P. Jones (1951–)	United States	Laleh Khadivi (1977–)	Iran; United States
2014	Ilya Kaminsky (1977–)	Ukraine; United States	Lauren Camp (–)	United States
2014	Chang-Rae Lee (1965–)	South Korea; United States	Krys Lee (–)	South Korea; United States
2014	Edouard Maunick (1931–2021)	Mauritius	Ananda Devi (1957–)	Mauritius
2014	Haruki Murakami (1949–)	Japan	Deji Olukotun (1978–)	Nigeria; United States
2014	Cecile Pineda (1932–2022)	United States	Lorna Dee Cervantes (1954–)	United States
2014	Ghassan Zaqtan (1954–)	Palestine	Fady Joudah (1971–)	Palestine; United States
2016	Dubravka Ugrešić (1949–2023)	Croatia; Netherlands	Alison Anderson (1965–)	United States; Switzerland
2016	Can Xue (1953–)	China	Porochista Khakpour (1978–)	Iran; United States
2016	Caryl Churchill (1938–)	England	Jordan Tannahill (1988–)	Canada
2016	Carolyn Forché (1950–)	United States	Valzhyna Mort (1981–)	Belarus; United States
2016	Aminatta Forna (1965–)	Sierra Leone; England	Mũkoma wa Ngũgĩ (1971–)	Kenya; United States
2016	Ann-Marie MacDonald (1958–)	Canada	Padma Viswanathan (1968–)	Canada; United States
2016	Guadalupe Nettel (1973–)	Mexico	Valeria Luiselli (1983–)	Mexico
2016	Don Paterson (1963–)	Scotland	Amit Majmudar (1979–)	United States
2016	Ghassan Zaqtan (1954–)	Palestine	Wang Ping (1957–)	China; United States
2018	Edwidge Danticat (1969–)	Haiti; United States	Achy Obejas (1956–)	Cuba; United States
2018	Emmanuel Carrère (1957–)	France	Zia Haider Rahman (1969–)	Bangladesh; England
2018	Amitav Ghosh (1956–)	India	Dipika Mukherjee (–)	India
2018	Aracelis Girmay (1977–)	United States	Mahtem Shiferraw (–)	Ethiopia; Eritrea
2018	Mohsin Hamid (1971–)	Pakistan; England	Adnan Mahmutović (1974–)	Bosnia and Herzegovina; Sweden
2018	Jamaica Kincaid (1949–)	Antigua and Barbuda; United States	Ladan Osman (–)	Somalia; United States
2018	Yusef Komunyakaa (1947–)	United States	Major Jackson (1968–)	United States
2018	Patricia Smith (1955–)	United States	Sasha Pimentel (–)	Philippines; United States
2018	Ludmila Ulitskaya (1943–)	Russia	Alisa Ganieva (1985–)	Russia
2020	Ismail Kadare (1936–2024)	Albania	Kapka Kassabova (1973–)	Bulgaria
2020	Emmanuel Carrère (1957–)	France	Felipe Restrepo Pombo (1978–)	Colombia
2020	Jorie Graham (1950–)	United States	Dunya Mikhail (1965–)	Iraq; United States
2020	Jessica Hagedorn (1949–)	United States	Joseph O. Legaspi (1971–)	United States
2020	Eduardo Halfon (1971–)	Guatemala	Anna Badkhen (1975–)	Russia
2020	Sahar Khalifeh (1941–)	Palestine	Philip Metres (1970–)	United States
2020	Abdellatif Laâbi (1942–)	Morocco	André Naffis-Sahely (1985–)	United Arab Emirates; United States
2020	Lee Maracle (1950–2021)	Canada	Katherena Vermette (1977–)	Canada
2020	Hòa Nguyễn (1967–)	Vietnam; United States	Vi Khi Nao (1979–)	Vietnam; United States
2022	Boubacar Boris Diop (1946–)	Senegal	Jennifer Croft (1981–)	United States
2022	Jean-Pierre Balpe (1942–)	France	Hamid Ismailov (1954–)	Uzbekistan; England
2022	Kwame Dawes (1962–)	Ghana; Jamaica	Matthew Shenoda (1977–)	United States
2022	Natalie Diaz (1978–)	United States	R. O. Kwon (–)	South Korea; United States
2022	Michalis Ganas (1944–2024)	Greece	Eleni Kefala (–)	Cyprus
2022	Micheline Aharonian Marcom (1968–)	United States	Fowzia Karimi (1973–)	Afghanistan; United States
2022	Naomi Shihab Nye (1952–)	United States	Tarfia Faizullah (1980–)	United States
2022	Ludmilla Petrushevskaya (1938–)	Russia	Olga Zilberboug (1979–)	Russia; United States
2022	Cristina Rivera Garza (1964–)	Mexico	Carlos Labbé (1977–)	Chile
2022	Reina María Rodríguez (1952–)	Cuba	Carlos Pintado (1974–)	Cuba; United States
2024	Ananda Devi (1957–)	Mauritius	Fabienne Kanor (1970–)	France
2024	Chris Abani (1966–)	Nigeria	Romeo Oriogun (1992–)	Nigeria
2024	Angie Cruz (1972–)	United States	Cleyvis Natera (–)	Dominican Republic; United States
2024	Jenny Erpenbeck (1967–)	Germany	Alina Stefanescu (–)	Romania; United States
2024	Nona Fernández (1971–)	Chile	Idra Novey (1978–)	United States
2024	Juan Felipe Herrera (1948–)	United States	Allison Hedge Coke (1958–)	United States
2024	Maxine Hong Kingston (1940–)	United States	Jennifer Kwon Dobbs (1976–)	South Korea
2024	Valeria Luiselli (1983–)	Mexico	Alexandra Lytton Regalado (1979–)	El Salvador; United States
2024	Shahrnush Parsipur (1946–)	Iran	Sholeh Wolpé (1962–)	Iran; United States
2026	Ibrahim Nasrallah (1954–)	Palestine	Shereen Malherbe (1980–)	Palestine; England
2026	Yuri Andrukhovych (1960–)	Ukraine	Polina Barskova (1976–)	Russia
2026	Elif Batuman (1977–)	United States	Maya Arad (1971–)	Israel
2026	Mei-mei Berssenbrugge (1947–)	China; United States	Victoria Chang (1970–)	United States
2026	Robert Olen Butler (1945–)	United States	Iheoma Nwachukwu (1990–)	Nigeria
2026	Safia Elhillo (1990–)	United States	Threa Almontaser (1993–)	Yemen; United States
2026	Mathias Énard (1972–)	France	Beena Kamlani (–)	India; United States
2026	Yoko Tawada (1960–)	Japan; Germany	Elisabeth Jaquette (1985–)	United States
2026	Jesmyn Ward (1977–)	United States	Alejandro Puyana (1981–)	Venezuela; United States

== NSK Neustadt Prize for Children's Literature ==
The Neustadt family announced during the 2026 award season that they would increase the NSK Prize's cash award to $50,000, making it equal to the Neustadt International Prize.

Year	Name	Country	Language(s)	Ref(s)
2003	Mildred D. Taylor	United States	English	
2005	Brian Doyle	Canada	English	
2007	Katherine Paterson	United States	English	
2009	Vera B. Williams	United States	English	
2011	Virginia Euwer Wolff	United States	English	
2013	Naomi Shihab Nye	United States	English	
2015	Meshack Asare	Ghana	English	
2017	Marilyn Nelson	United States	English	
2019	Margarita Engle	United States (Cuban)	English	
2021	Cynthia Leitich Smith	United States (Muscogee Creek Nation)	English	
2023	Gene Luen Yang	United States	English	
2025	Cherie Dimaline	Canada (Métis Nation of Ontario)	English	

== See also ==
- List of literary awards
