= Etel Adnan bibliography =

Bibliography of works by Etel Adnan

This is a bibliography of published writings by Etel Adnan.

== Books and chapbooks ==
=== English-language works ===
- Adnan, Etel (1967). Moon Shots. Sausalito, California: Sausalito-Belvedere Gazette.
- Adnan, Etel (1982). Sitt Marie Rose. Translated by Kleege, Georgina. Sausalito, California: The Post-Apollo Press. ISBN 978-0-942996-33-3.
- Adnan, Etel (1982). From A to Z: A Poem. Sausalito, California: The Post-Apollo Press. ISBN 978-0-942996-00-5.
- Adnan, Etel (1985). The Indian Never Had a Horse and Other Poems. Sausalito, California: The Post-Apollo Press. ISBN 978-0-942996-03-6. LCCN 84062017. OCLC 11814738. OL 2872854M.
- Adnan, Etel (1986). Journey to Mount Tamalpais: An Essay. Sausalito, California: The Post-Apollo Press. ISBN 978-0-942996-01-2. LCCN 86012228. OCLC 13580272. OL 2718934M.
- Adnan, Etel (2007) [1989]. The Arab Apocalypse. Translated by Adnan, Etel (3rd ed.). The Post-Apollo Press. ISBN 978-0-942996-60-9.
- Adnan, Etel (1990). The Spring Flowers Own & The Manifestations of the Voyage. Sausalito, California: The Post-Apollo Press. ISBN 978-0-942996-14-2.
- Adnan, Etel (1993). Of Cities and Women: Letters to Fawwaz. Sausalito, California: The Post-Apollo Press. ISBN 978-0-942996-21-0. LCCN 92050342. OCLC 32061210. OL 1743205M.
- Adnan, Etel (1993). Paris, When It's Naked. Sausalito, California: The Post-Apollo Press. ISBN 978-0-942996-20-3. LCCN 92050341. OCLC 28068061. OL 1743204M.
- Adnan, Etel (1997). There: In the Light and the Darkness of the Self and of the Other. Sausalito, California: The Post-Apollo Press. ISBN 978-0-942996-28-9.
- Adnan, Etel (2002). In/somnia. Sausalito, California: The Post-Apollo Press. ISBN 978-0-942996-48-7.
- Adnan, Etel (2005). In the Heart of the Heart of Another Country. San Francisco: City Lights Books. ISBN 978-0-87286-446-7.
- Adnan, Etel (2008). Seasons. The Post-Apollo Press. ISBN 978-0-942996-66-1.
- Adnan, Etel (2009). Master of the Eclipse. Northampton, Massachusetts: Interlink Publishing Group. ISBN 978-1-56656-779-4.
- Adnan, Etel (2012). Sea and Fog. Nightboat Books. ISBN 978-0-9844598-7-2.
- Adnan, Etel (2014). Donovan, Thom; Shimoda, Brandon; Alcalay, Ammiel; Swensen, Cole (eds.). To look at the sea is to become what one is: An Etel Adnan Reader. Nightboat Books. ISBN 978-1-937658-21-2.
- Adnan, Etel (2014). Premonition. Berkeley, California: Kelsey Street Press. ISBN 978-0-932716-82-8.
- Adnan, Etel (2016). Life Is A Weaving. Galerie Lelong. ISBN 978-2-86882-123-2.
- Adnan, Etel (2016). Night. Nightboat Books. ISBN 978-1-937658-53-3.
- Adnan, Etel (2018). Surge. Nightboat Books. ISBN 978-1-937658-85-4.
- Adnan, Etel (18 June 2019). Time. Translated by Riggs, Sarah. Nightboat Books. ISBN 978-1-64362-004-6.
- Adnan, Etel (27 October 2020). Shifting the Silence. Nightboat Books. ISBN 978-1-64362-030-5.

=== Arabic-language works ===
- Adnan, Etel (1979). al-Sitt Mari Ruz (الست ماري روز) (in Arabic). Translated by Shahin, Jirum. Beirut: al-Mu’assasah al-‘Arabiyah lil-Dirasat wa-al-Nashr.
- Adnan, Etel (1994). Kitab al-bahr; kitab al-layl; kitab al-mawt; kitab al-nihayah (كتاب البحر - كتاب الليل - كتاب الموت - كتاب النهاية) (in Arabic). Beirut: Dar Amwaj lil-Tiba‘ah wa-al-Nashr wa-al-Tawzi‘.
- Adnan, Etel (1998). ʻAn mudun wa-nisaʼ: rasaʼil ila Fawwaz (عن مدن ونساء: رسائل إلى فواز) (in Arabic). Translated by Salih, Danyal. Beirut: Dar al-Nahar. ISBN 978-2-84289-087-2.

=== French-language works ===
- Adnan, Etel (1973). Jébu. Suivi de L'express Beyrouth-enfer (in French). Paris: P. J. Oswald.
- Adnan, Etel (1978). Sitt Marie Rose (in French). Paris: Des femmes.
- Adnan, Etel (1980). L'Apocalypse arabe (in French). Paris: Papyrus. ISBN 2-86541-006-4.
- Adnan, Etel (1997). Ce ciel qui n'est pas (in French). Paris; Montreal: L'Harmattan. ISBN 2-7384-6046-1.
- Adnan, Etel (2011). Paris mis à nu (in French). Beirut: Éditions Tamyras. ISBN 978-2-36086-015-9.
- Adnan, Etel (3 June 2013). Là-bas (in French). Translated by Borel, Marie; Valéry, Françoise. Bordeaux: Éditions de l'Attente. ISBN 978-2-36242-040-5.
- Adnan, Etel (2015). Prémonition (in French). Paris: Galerie Lelong & Co. ISBN 978-2-86882-114-0.
- Adnan, Etel (2015). Le prix que nous ne voulons pas payer pour l'amour (in French). Paris: Galerie Lelong & Co. ISBN 978-2-86882-116-4.
- Adnan, Etel (2015). A propos de la fin de l'Empire Ottoman (in French). Paris: Galerie Lelong & Co. ISBN 978-2-86882-119-5.
- Adnan, Etel (12 October 2015). Mer et brouillard (in French). Translated by Robert, Jérémy Victor. Bordeaux: Éditions de l'Attente. ISBN 978-2-36242-057-3.
- Adnan, Etel (2016). La vie est un tissage (in French). Paris: Galerie Lelong & Co. ISBN 978-2-86882-121-8.
- Adnan, Etel (22 November 2017). Nuit (in French). Translated by Despalles, Françoise. Bordeaux: Éditions de l'Attente. ISBN 978-2-36242-071-9.
- Adnan, Etel (15 June 2018). Tolérance (in French). L'Échoppe. ISBN 978-2-84068-299-8.
- Adnan, Etel (2019). Grandir et devenir poète au Liban (in French). Translated by Cotensin, Patrice. Paris: L'Échoppe. ISBN 978-2-84068-309-4.
- Adnan, Etel (2020). Un printemps inattendu (entretiens) (in French). Paris: Galerie Lelong & Co. ISBN 978-2-86882-142-3.
- Adnan, Etel (2020). Voyage, guerre, exil (in French). Translated by Cotensin, Patrice. Paris: L'Échoppe. ISBN 978-2-84068-312-4.
