= Le Temps des cerises (publisher) =

- Founded: 1993; 33 years ago
- Founder: Collective
- Country of origin: France
- Headquarters location: Montreuil
- Publication types: Books
- Fiction genres: Literature, poetry, essays.
- Imprints: "101 poèmes", "Petite bibliothèque de poésie", "Romans des libertés", "Liberté des romans" etc.
- Revenue: 237 400,00 €.(2015)
- Official website: http://www.letempsdescerises.net

Le Temps des cerises is a French publishing house founded in 1993 by 33 writers.

== Le Temps des cerises publishers ==
The name of the house refers to the song Le Temps des cerises by Jean-Baptiste Clément. It was chosen to "indicate both the attachment to the ideals of the Paris Commune and to a certain tradition of popular poetry, most often obscured". The little "e" of CeRISES (cherries) saying in its own way that this hope maintained is in a time of CRISES...".

The catalog of Le Temps des cerises counts more than 700 titles. The house has created numerous series including "101 poèmes", the "Petite bibliothèque de poésie", "Romans des libertés" and "Liberté des romans", the "Petite collection rouge", the "Collection blanche", the series collections "Matière à pensées", "Le Merle moqueur" and "Histoire contemporaine", as well as the "Cahiers Roger Vailland"" and publishes the magazine Commune.

Books have been issued in co-publishing with the "Maison de la poésie Rhône-Alpes", the publishing houses Écrits des forges and Éditions du Noroît and took over the fund of the Ipomée editions. A series with Les Lettres Françaises and one with Action poétique have also been created.

=== Some themes ===
Some themes dear to Le Temps des Cerises :

- Communism, globalization, liberalism, the Paris Commune, the working class, trade unionism, slavery, colonialism, the third world, the status of women, and so on.
- essays against capitalism, World Trade Organization, the International Monetary Fund, Nicolas Sarkozy, etc.
- essays on Louise Michel, Jean Jaurès, Vladimir Lenin, Joseph Staline, Maurice Thorez, Robert Vizet, Fidel Castro, Che Guevara, Hugo Chávez, etc.

And also:

- philosophical essays on Jean-Jacques Rousseau, Pierre Bourdieu
- literary essays on Victor Hugo, George Sand, Jules Verne, Émile Zola, Louis Aragon, Nazım Hikmet, Bernard Noël
- essays on art (including one on Pierre Soulages)

=== Some authors ===
- History
  - Hô Chi Minh, Henri Alleg
- World
  - Danielle Bleitrach, Richard Labévière
- Politics
  - Rosa Luxemburg, Noam Chomsky, Anicet Le Pors, René-Émile Piquet, Léo Figuères, André Gerin
- Economy
  - Karl Marx, Samir Amin
- Society
  - Gracchus, Friedrich Engels, Pier Paolo Pasolini, Danielle Mitterrand, Roland Passevant, Mouloud Aounit, Mumia Abu-Jamal
- Philosophy
  - Louis Althusser
- Novels and short stories
  - Jack London, Maxim Gorky, César Vallejo, Elsa Triolet, Robert Desnos, Nikolai Ostrovsky, Paul Nizan, Jacques Roumain, Jorge Amado, Michel Buenzod, Georges Coulonges, Pierre Courtade, Raymond Jean, René Ballet, Roger Bordier, Jacques Krier, Clément Lépidis, Pierre Gamarra, Jean-Pierre Bastid, Jacques Mondoloni, Maxime Vivas, Luis de Miranda
- Tales
  - Anton Chekhov
- Novels, short stories and essays on society and art
  - Roger Vailland, Suzanne Bernard
- Novels, short stories and poetry
  - Charles Dobzynski
- Novels and poetry
  - Ernesto Cardenal, Jean Metellus.
- Political essays and poetry
  - Louis Aragon
- Essays society and poetry
  - John Berger.
- Poetry
  - Omar Khayyam, Heinrich Heine, François Coppée, Carl Sandburg, Charles Vildrac, translation by Vladimir Maïakovski, Paul Éluard, Yánnis Rítsos, Jaroslav Seifert, Ilarie Voronca, Pablo Neruda, E.E. Cummings, Nazım Hikmet, Vladimir Pozner, Seamus Heaney, Rafael Alberti, Rouben Melik, Juan Gelman, Henri Deluy Jack Hirschman, Abdellatif Laâbi, Serge Pey, Gérard Cartier, Salah Al-Hamdani, Fernando Rendón, Francis Combes, Tahar Djaout, Maram al-Masri, David Dumortier, Jean-Paul Guedj
- Poetry and theatre
  - André Benedetto
- Poetry and literary essays
  - Jacques Gaucheron, Alain Marc
- Literary essays
  - Jean Ristat
- Songs
  - Jean-Baptiste Clément, Eugène Pottier, Gaston Couté, Claude Vinci
