= Jean-Pierre Balpe =

Jean-Pierre Balpe, born 1942 in Mende, France, is a French academic, poet, and writer.

== Career ==
=== Academic career ===
Balpe was a University Activities Professor and the director of the hypermedia department at the University of Paris VIII from 1990 to 2005.

=== Literary career and recognition ===
From 1974 to 2010, Balpe was the secretary general of the magazine Action poétique. In 2006, Balpe succeeded Henri Deluy as the director of Biennale internationale des poètes en Val-de-Marne (BIPVAL). He was also the co-director of the Interdisciplinary Center for Research in Digital Aesthetics (Paris 8-Ministry of Culture, DAP) and co-founder with Maurice Benayoun of CITU (Transdisciplinary Interactive University Creation) which he co-directed until 2005. He directed the Paragraphe laboratory from 1990 to 2004. He was responsible for the textual part of the exhibition, The Immaterials, Centre Pompidou, 1984–1985. He was also an advisor to the Public Information Library for the exhibition Memories of the Future, 1987–1988.

The Electronic Literature Organization held a conference celebrating Jean-Pierr Balpe:, (Meta-)Author: The Infinite Writing International Conference 12–13 June 2025 University of Paris 8, Campus Condorcet.

== Writing works ==
Jean-Pierre Balpe is a writer and researcher, connecting literature and computer science. He is an early electronic literature pioneer and has published books and articles on hypermedia, text generation, and digital creation.

=== Generative programmed writing ===
Balpe first worked in developing generative poetry for the computer in the 1980s, by working with several layers of metalanguages. These poems are programmed to produce randomly varied natural sentences in French. Balpe collected his programmed writing under the general heading Un univers de génération automatique littéraire” [“A universe of automatic literary generation”].

=== Other publications ===
In addition to his books, he has published poems, short stories and essays in the journals Action poétique, Autrement, Æncrages & Co, Europe, Hors-Cadres, Journal de Royaumont, Traverses, Signes du présent, Miroir de la nouvelle, Correspondances, Nouvelle donne, La Mazarine, and Le Temps stratégique.

== Awards ==
Balpe received the Grand Prix Multimédia in 1999 from the SGDL for the novel La Toile (published by CYLIBRIS), and was a finalist for the 2022 Neustadt International Prize for Literature.
