= René Ballet =

French journalist, novelist and essayist

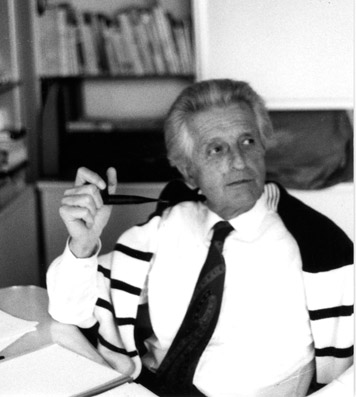
- René Ballet in 2015
- Born: 1928; Saint-Étienne, France
- Died: 2 January 2017 (aged 88–89)
- Education: University of Grenoble
- Occupations: Journalist, author
- Political party: French Communist Party
- Spouse: Simone Ballet

René Ballet (1928 – 2 January 2017) was a French journalist, novelist and essayist. A communist, he was an international correspondent for L’Humanité. He was the author of 14 novels and 35 essays, many of which were about Roger Vailland.

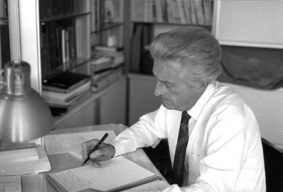
René Ballet, writing at his desk in 2015.

== Early life ==
René Ballet was born in 1928 in Saint-Étienne, France. He grew up in Grenoble, where he earned a bachelor of laws from the University of Grenoble.

Ballet joined the French Resistance during World War II.

== Career ==
Ballet joined the French Communist Party in Vanves near Paris in the 1960s. He started his career as a civil servant in Paris in 1961, first in finance and then in national education.

Ballet became a journalist, and he mostly wrote for the automobile press. He also appeared on television as a contributor. He then became the editor-in-chief of Constellation, a Franco-Swiss magazine. From 1971 to 1978, he worked as a communications manager for Fiat S.p.A. He became an international correspondent for L’Humanité, a communist newspaper, and its Sunday newspaper, L’Humanité Dimanche, in 1978.

Ballet was the author of 14 novels and 35 essays. He published his first novel, Echec et Mat, in 1960. His 1986 novel, L'organidrame, was selected for the Prix Goncourt (awarded to Michel Host for Valet de nuit instead). His 1994 novel, L'hôtel des deux gares, was about a collaborationist in Paris during World War II. His 2002 novel, Retour à Santopal, was based on his career as a correspondent under Augusto Pinochet in Chile. Ballet also published research about the works of Roger Vailland. He was also the co-founder and vice-president of the Association Roger Vailland in 1995. Moreover, he served on the editorial board of the Cahiers Roger Vailland.

Ballet was the co-founder of Le Temps des Cerises, a publishing house, in 1993. He was the founding editor-in-chief of La Revue Commune in 1996. He became an honorary citizen of Vanves in 2004.

== Personal life and death ==
Ballet was married to Simone Ballet, a professor of economics and law at Paris Descartes University. They resided between Paris, Nice and La Chapelle-Fortin. They attended the Fête de l'Humanité annually.

Ballet died on 2 January 2017, at the age of 88.

== Selected works ==
=== Novels ===
- Ballet, René (1960). Échec et mat. Paris: Gallimard. OCLC 26963351.
- Ballet, René (1961). Les jours commencent à l'aube. Paris: Gallimard. OCLC 23409309.
- Ballet, René (1962). L'inutile retour. Paris: Gallimard. OCLC 459454116.
- Ballet, René (1972). Dérive. Paris: Calmann Levy. OCLC 12123581.
- Ballet, Rene (1984). Une petite ville sans mémoire. Paris: Temps actuels. ISBN 9782209055647. OCLC 12894274.
- Ballet, René (1986). L'Organidrame. Paris: Messidor. ISBN 9782209058228.
- Ballet, René (1987). Des usines et des hommes. Paris: Messidor. ISBN 9782209059409. OCLC 18615695.
- Ballet, René (1989). Soleil froid. Paris: Messidor. ISBN 9782209061822. OCLC 20922475.
- Ballet, René (1992). Le domaine du bout de l'île. Paris: Temps actuels. ISBN 9782209066612. OCLC 29793548.
- Ballet, Rene (1994). L'hôtel des deux gares. Pantin: Le Temps des Cerises. ISBN 9782841090143. OCLC 33078186.
- Ballet, René (1996). La Manipulation. Pantin: Le Temps des Cerises. ISBN 9782841090709. OCLC 465658926.
- Ballet, René (1999). Lettres texanes. Paris: Messidor. ISBN 9782209063307. OCLC 22274895.
- Ballet, René (2002). Retour à Santopal. Pantin: Le Temps des cerises. ISBN 9782841093618. OCLC 52631333.
- Ballet, René (2010). Soldes d'été au Lüger. Pantin: Le Temps des cerises. ISBN 9782841098545. OCLC 762714626.

=== Non-fiction ===
- Ballet, René; Vailland, Elisabeth (1973). Roger Vailland. Paris: Éditions Seghers. OCLC 797168.
- Ballet, René (1985). Bourges : une affaire de cœur. Paris: Messidor. ISBN 9782209056972. OCLC 21870792.
- Ballet, René (1988). Montluçon: bâtir la vie. Paris: Messidor. ISBN 9782209060931. OCLC 31088333.
- Ballet, René (1991). Auteurs sur la ville : essai-roman. Rouen: Médianes. ISBN 9782908345100. OCLC 27812899.
- Ballet, René (1997). La boîte noire. Pantin: Le Temps des Cerises. ISBN 9782841090921. OCLC 467517965.
- Ballet, René; Petr, Christian (1999). Le Réalisme socialiste : ce bel inconnu. Pantin: Revue Commune. ISBN 9782841092109. OCLC 47625183.
- Ballet, René (2003). Reporter de l'interdit. Pantin: Le Temps des Cerises. ISBN 9782841093830. OCLC 470363647.
- Ballet, René (2007). Cocktail au curare : à consommer avec précaution, peut nuire à la quiétude et au sens moral. Pantin: Le Temps des Cerises. ISBN 9782841096701. OCLC 183257465.
