= Sonja Mejcher-Atassi =

German cultural historian and scholar of Arabic literatures and art

- Born: August 8, 1972 (age 54); Tübingen, Germany
- Education: Free University of Berlin, University of Oxford
- Occupation: Professor at the American University of Beirut
- Known for: Research on Near Eastern literatures and art

Sonja Mejcher-Atassi (born 8 August 1972 in Tübingen, Germany) is a German writer, cultural historian, and professor of Arabic Studies and Comparative Literature at the American University of Beirut. She is mainly known for her scholarship on Middle Eastern literature and their intersections with art.

== Biography ==
=== Education and career ===
Mejcher-Atassi received her MA from the Free University of Berlin in 2000, and her DPhil from the University of Oxford in 2005. She joined the American University of Beirut's Faculty of Arts and Sciences in 2005. During the academic year 2017–2018, she was an invited resident fellow at the Institute for Advanced Study in Berlin. She is the recipient of the 2021 Alexander von Humboldt Foundation's Reimar Lüst Research Award for International Scholarly and Cultural Exchange and the 2008 Annemarie Schimmel Research Award.

== Research ==
Mejcher-Atassi's research focuses on modern Arabic literature from a global perspective and closely intersects with cultural and intellectual history. Interdisciplinary in scope, it engages with memory studies, life writing/(auto)biography, literature archives and writers’ libraries, gender studies, global modernism, interrelations of word and image, book culture/art, and aesthetics and politics.

=== An Impossible Friendship: Group Portrait, Jerusalem Before and After 1948 ===
This work brings to life a circle of young men and women who came together across religious lines in Palestine under the British Mandate, among them Wolfgang Hildesheimer, Jabra Ibrahim Jabra, Sally Kassab, Walid Khalidi, and Rasha Salam. "In exploring this ecumenical friendship and its artistic, literary, and intellectual legacies, Mejcher-Atassi demonstrates how social biography can provide a picture of the past that is at once more inclusive and more plural. This group portrait, she argues, allows us to glimpse alternative possibilities that exist within and alongside the fraught history of Israel/Palestine."

=== Reading across Modern Arabic Literature and Art ===
This work draws on interarts studies to chart new approaches to the study of modern Arabic literature. It focuses on three literary writers and their rapport with visual art: Jabra Ibrahim Jabra, ‘Abd al-Rahman Munif, and Etel Adnan.

=== Geschichten über Geschichten: Erinnerung im Romanwerk von Elias Khoury ===
This work explores the role of literature and memory in times of political crisis, focusing on Elias Khoury's novels written during the Lebanese Civil War (1975–1990).

=== The Theatre of Sa’dallah Wannous: A Critical Study of the Syrian Playwright and Public Intellectual ===
This is the first English-language book about the significance and complexity of Saadallah Wannous’ life and work. The book exemplifies “the role of cultural production—especially dramatic literature—in providing a portrait of and shaping a culture in the throes of profound transformation.”

=== Rafa Nasiri: Artist Books ===
This work traces Rafa Nasiri's trajectory as a graphic artist, his journey from Baghdad to Beijing in the late 1950s, as well as his artistic engagement with different traditions of works on paper from across the Arab world, China, and Europe.

=== Archives, Museums and Collecting Practices in the Modern Arab World ===
Kamal Boullata, a Palestinian artist and critic, describes the book as a work regarding collecting practices in the Arab world. According to Boullata, the text provides information for readers on the cultural history of the region, the history of modernity, and the development of a national identity.

=== Writing a ‘Tool for Change’: ‘Abd al-Rahman Munif Remembered ===
Described by Sabry Hafez as “an Arabian master” in the art of the novel, Munif was also a distinguished intellectual and an expert in petroleum economics. The volume includes a newly translated essay Munif wrote on the Iraqi artist Jewad Selim and his Monument of Freedom.

== Publications ==
=== Authored books ===
- An Impossible Friendship: Group Portrait, Jerusalem Before and After 1948, New York: Columbia University Press, 2024.
- Reading across Modern Arabic Literature and Art, Wiesbaden: Reichert, 2012.
- Geschichten über Geschichten: Erinnerung im Romanwerk von Elias Khoury, Wiesbaden: Reichert, 2001. (in German)

=== Edited volumes ===
- The Theatre of Sa’dallah Wannous: A Critical Study of the Syrian Playwright and Public Intellectual, eds. Sonja Mejcher-Atassi and * , Cambridge: Cambridge University Press, 2021.
- Rafa Nasiri: Artist Books, eds. Sonja Mejcher-Atassi and May Muzaffar, Milan: Skira, 2016.
- Archives, Museums and Collecting Practices in the Modern Arab World, eds. Sonja Mejcher-Atassi and John Pedro Schwartz, Farnham: Ashgate, 2012.
- Writing a ‘Tool for Change’: ‘Abd al-Rahman Munif Remembered, ed. Sonja Mejcher-Atassi, MIT Electronic Journal of Middle East Studies vol. 7, 2007.
- Helmut Mejcher, Fusul min tarikh al-sharq al-awsat (articles by Helmut Mejcher translated into Arabic and presented to him on his 80th birthday), ed. Sonja Mejcher-Atassi, Beirut: Dar al-Tanweer, 2017.
- Helmut Mejcher, Zeithorizonte im Nahen Osten: Studien und Miszellen zur Geschichte im 20. Jahrhundert (articles by Helmut Mejcher collected and presented to him on his 75th birthday), eds. Sonja Mejcher-Atassi and Marianne Schmidt-Dumont, Berlin: LIT Verlag, 2012.

== See also ==
- American University of Beirut
