= Jean Malrieu =

French poet

Jean Malrieu (29 August 1915, Montauban – 24 April 1976, Montauban) was a 20th-century French poet.

== Biography ==
He attended high school in his hometown and then studied law. He was mobilized in 1939. After the war, he practiced various trades, before becoming a teacher. He established friendly relations with the Surrealists and met André Breton on the occasion of the publication of his collection Préface à l'amour in 1953. He collaborated with several publications of the surrealist movement. As a communist militant, he distanced himself from the French Communist Party in 1956 after the Soviet intervention in Hungary. He evolved from a lyrical writing to a drier, sometimes more anguished writing, but always attentive to everyday objects, animals, plants and the earth that carries them. He asserted that poetry "requires rigorous language."

He created the magazines Action poétique (1950–1956, with Gérald Neveu) then Sud (1970), which would continue the action of Les Cahiers du Sud.

== Prizes ==
- 1953: Prix Guillaume Apollinaire
- 1963: Prix Antonin-Artaud

== Bibliography ==
- 1953: Préface à l'amour, Cahiers du Sud, Marseille, prix Guillaume Apollinaire
- 1963: Vesper, Prix Antonin Artaud
- 1968: le Nom secret suivi de La Vallée des Rois, Introduction de Georges Mounin, Honfleur, Pierre Jean Oswald
- 1971: Préface à l'amour suivi de Hectares de Soleil, Honfleur, Pierre Jean Oswald
- 1972: le Château cathare, Paris, Éditions Seghers
- 1975: Possible imaginaire, Paris, Pierre Jean Oswald
- 1976: le Plus Pauvre Héritier, lithographs by Adrien Dax, Paris, Éditions Privat
- 1976: les Maisons de feuillages, Éditions Saint-Germain-des-Prés, Paris
- 1978: Mes manières instinctives (composed in 1958), Dijon, Brandes
- 2004: Libre comme une maison en flammes – Œuvres poétiques 1935–1976, Le Cherche midi

== Studies on Jean Malrieu ==
- 2004: Jean Malrieu. L'inquiétude et la ferveur – A collective work with unpublished works by Jean Malrieu and studies by writers and scholars on various aspects of his work. Available at the Babel laboratory of the University of Toulon
- 2007: Jean Malrieu by Pierre Dhainaut, éd. des Vanneaux
