= Gabriella Ghermandi =

Italo-Ethiopian Writer

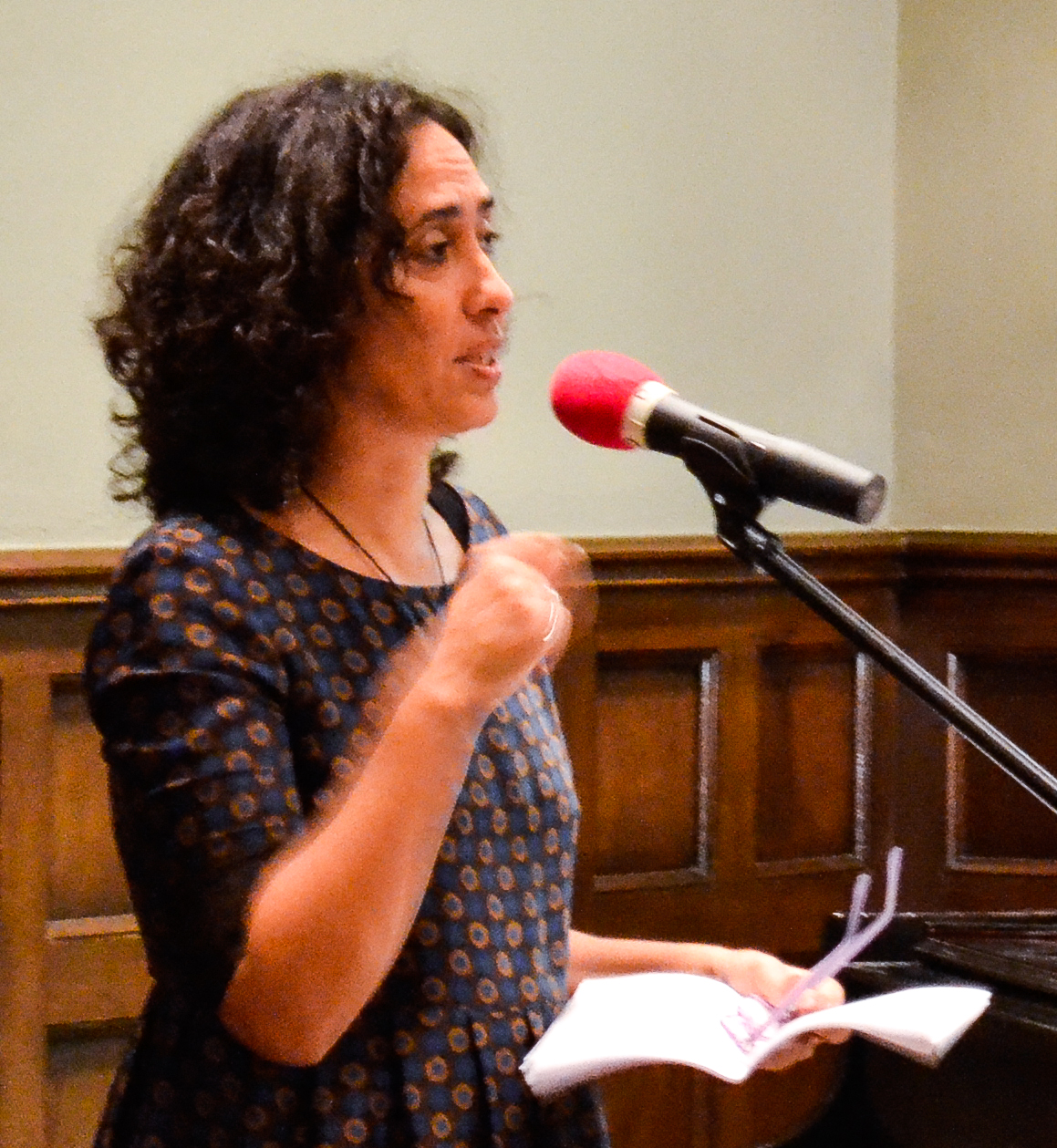
Ghermandi reads from her work at the 2013 Neustadt Festival

Gabriella Ghermandi (born 1965) is an Italo-Ethiopian writer and performer. Ghermandi's writing focuses on the intersection of African (specifically Ethiopian) and Italian identity.

== Early life ==
Ghermandi was born in Addis Ababa to an Italian father from Bologna and an Italo-Ethiopian mother. Ghermandi's mother was born to an Italian military officer and Eritrean mother who were separated due to racial policies of the then Fascist-controlled colony Italian East Africa before marrying Ghermandi's Italian father following the end of the Fascist Italian government. Ghermandi states that she was brought up "white" by her mother, stating that her mom had faced exclusion from the Ethiopian community when she was being raised in an Italian convent due to her mixed-race status. Following the death of her father, Ghermandi moved to Bologna at the age of 14. In her adolescence in Bologna, Ghermandi has stated feeling homesick and having a longing for her community in Ethiopia.

== Career ==
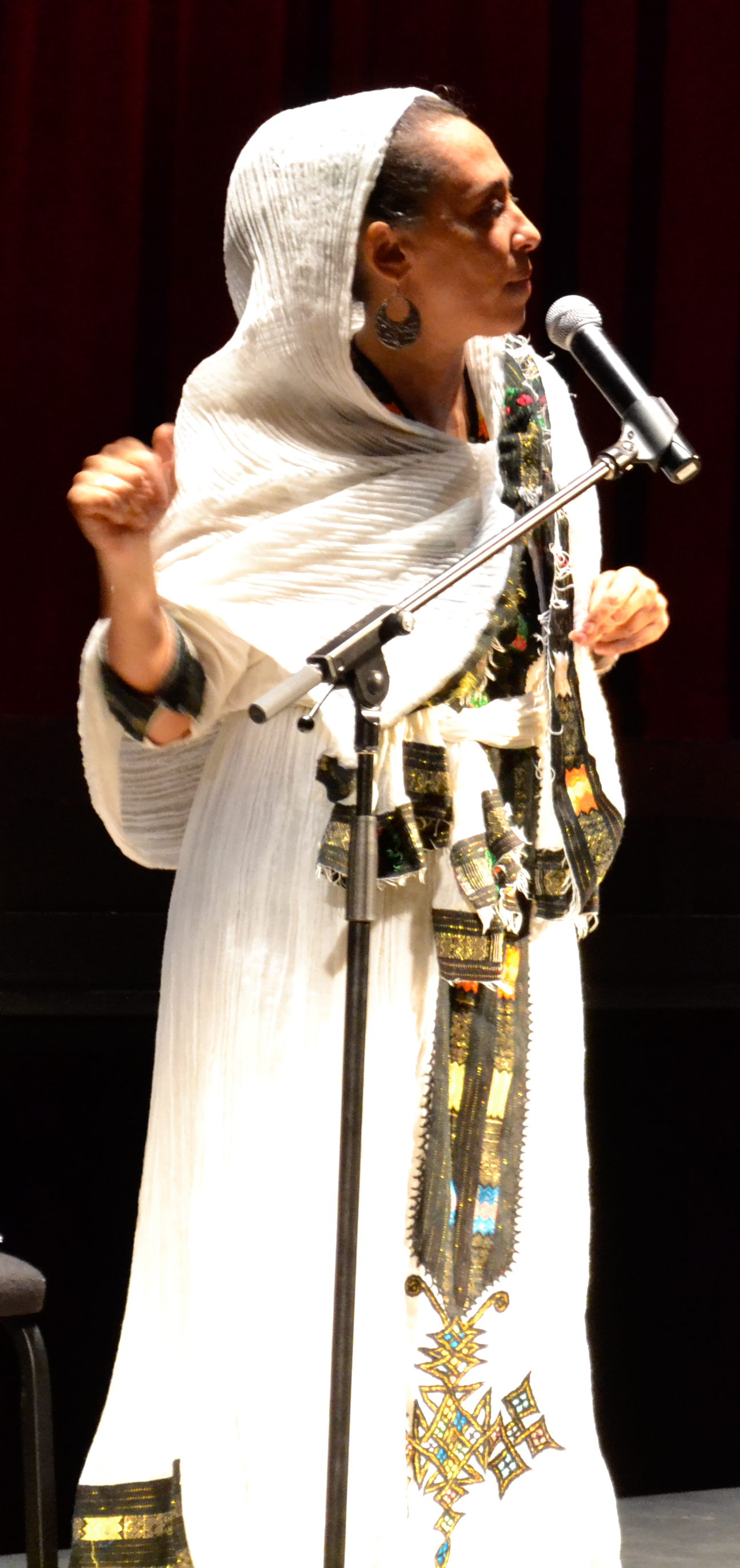
Ghermandi performing in traditional Ethiopian dress at the 2013 Neustadt Festival

Ghermandi gained recognition in 1999, winning the Eks & Tra Literary Prize for migrant writers through the publisher Fara Editore. She went on to win third place two more times in 2001 and 2003 in the same competition. In 2003, Ghermandi was one of the founders of the online literary journal El Ghibli. Ghermandi's first novel, Regina di fiori e di perle (Queen of Flowers and Pearls) was published by Donzelli Editore in 2007. An English language translation was published in 2015 and earned positive reviews.

In 2010, Ghermandi started the Atse Tewodros Project, a music project named for Atse Tewodros II, the first Ethiopian emperor not of royal descent. The project's first CD was originally self-released in 2013 and then was released by the label ARC Music in 2016, titled Ethiopia - Celebrating Emperor Tewodros II. Since 2018, Ghermandi has been working on another project titled Maqeda, named for the Ethiopian name of the Queen of Sheba, focusing on femininity in Ethiopian mythology.

== Works ==
=== Writing ===
- Il telefono del quartiere (1999)
- Quel certo temperamento focoso (2001)
- Regina di fiori e di perle (2007. Donzelli Editore)
  - Queen of Flowers and Pearls (English translation by Giovanna Bellesia-Contuzzi and Victoria Offredi Poletto; 2015. Indiana University Press)

=== Music ===
- Ethiopia - Celebrating Emperor Tewodros II (2016. ARC Music)
