= Gérald Neveu =

French poet

Gérald Neveu (August 10, 1921, Marseille - February 28, 1960, Paris) was a French poet. Called by some "one of the gentlest poètes maudits", he was born to Louis Neveu and Marthe Bonnaud in Marseille. Having lost his family and job and having become an alcoholic, he lived as a hobo and dreamer in Marseille sleeping in friends' studios, homeless shelters or psychiatric clinics (together with Artaud he went through electroshocks). Since 1947 he was a member of the French Communist Party. In 1950 he befriended Jean Malrieu with whom he created the magazine Action poétique. A few months before his death he came to Paris where he was found dead one day; the cause of his death remains unknown. His wallet contained only a piece of paper saying "without hair, without teeth, without money, without a woman, without an apartment etc."

== Selected bibliography ==
He worked with the famous review Les Cahiers du Sud and also with Action Poétique.

- 1960: Les Sept commandements
- 1967: Fournaise obscure
- 1973: Une solitude essentielle
- 1992: Poèmes 1945-1960
- 1993: Comme les loups vont au désir : toujours pour toi, Éditions Comp'act, Seyssel

== References and external links ==
- Gérald Neveu, in French
