= Simone Fattal =

Syrian-American artist

- Born: 1942 (age 83–84); Damascus, Syria
- Partner: Etel Adnan
- Writing career
- Genre: Visual arts
- Literary movement: Hurufiyya movement

Simone Fattal (Arabic: سيمون فتال; born 1942) is a Syrian-American artist.

She was born in Damascus, Syria and was later educated in Beirut and Paris, studying philosophy at the École des Lettres and the Sorbonne, as well as archaeology at the École du Louvre. She returned to Beirut in 1969, where she began a career as a painter. She began working in clay at The Art Institute of California, later working in Grasse with ceramic artist Hans Spinner.

She lived with poet and artist Etel Adnan, until Adnan's death in November 2021. The couple left Lebanon for Sausalito, California in 1980. There, Fattal established a publishing house Post-Apollo Press. She returned to the visual arts in 1988, producing sculpture, watercolors, paintings and collage. The couple later moved to Paris, where they benefited from a residency at Cité internationale des arts in 2002.

In 2017, she was nominated for an AWARE prize for women artists.

In 2019, a retrospective of her work Works and Days was presented at the Museum of Modern Art's MoMA PS1. Her work has also been exhibited at the Yves Saint Laurent Museum in Marrakesh, at the Rochechouart Museum of Contemporary Art and at the Sharjah Art Foundation.

In April 2021, Fattal assisted an exhibition with Serhan Ada at the Pera Museum in Istanbul of Etel Adnan's work.

Finding a Way, commissioned by the Whitechapel Gallery, was on view in London between 21 Sep 2021 – 15 May 2022. Her work was included in the 2024 exhibition Making Their Mark: Works from the Shah Garg Collection at the Berkeley Art Museum and Pacific Film Archive (BAMPFA).

== Public collections ==
Her artworks are included in international public collections such as Centre Pompidou, Paris, France; mumok – Museum moderner Kunst Stiftung Ludwig Wien, Vienna; Sharjah Art Foundation, Sharjah, United Arab Emirates; Walker Art Center, Minneapolis; among others.
