= Mirkka Rekola =

Finnish writer (1931–2014)

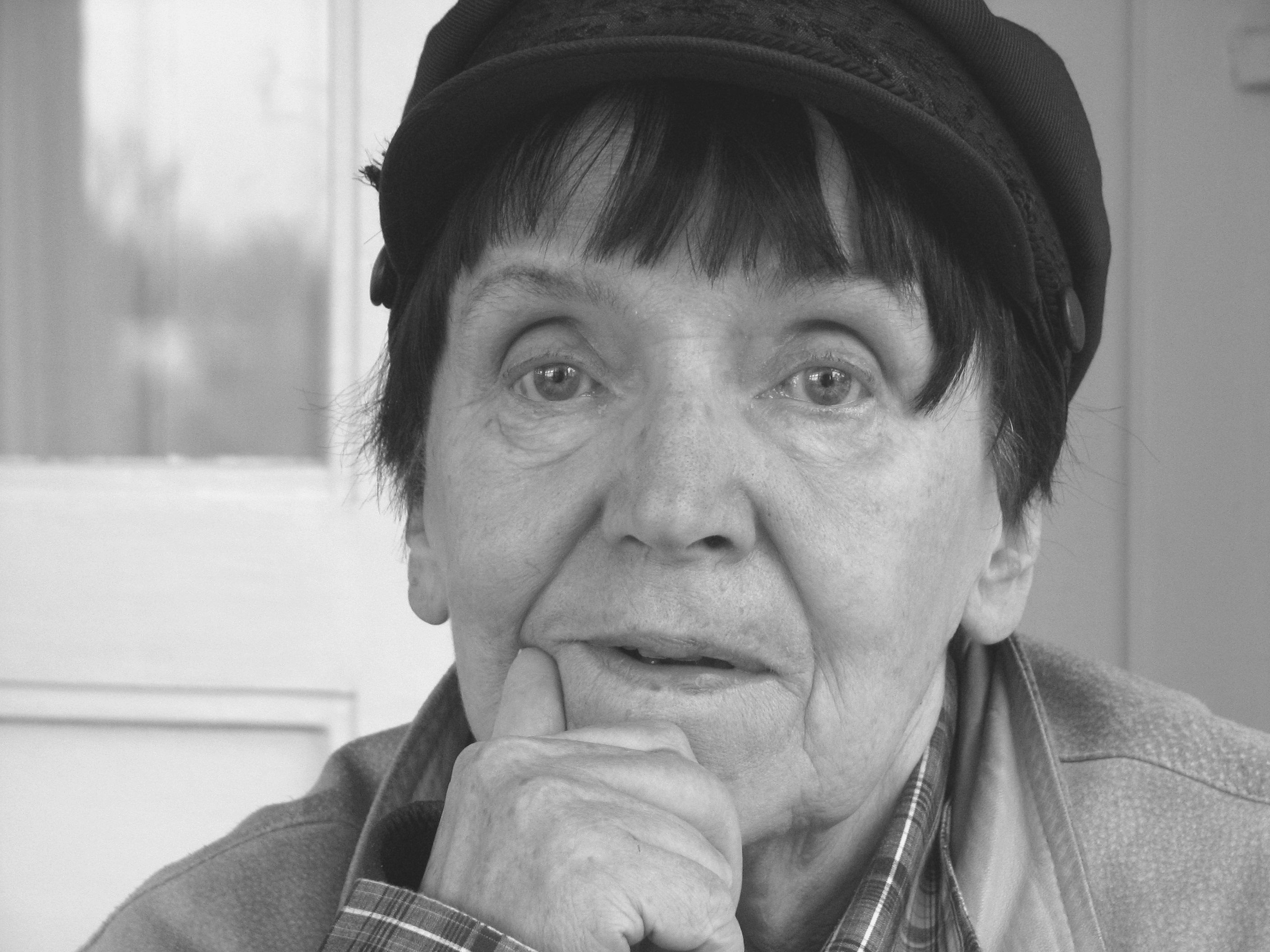
- Born: Mirkka Elina Rekola; 26 June 1931; Tampere, Finland
- Died: 5 February 2014 (aged 82); Helsinki, Finland
- Occupations: Poet, aphorist, essayist
- Writing career
- Language: Finnish
- Website: www.kaapeli.fi/rekola

Mirkka Elina Rekola (26 June 1931 – 5 February 2014) was a Finnish writer from Tampere who published poems, aphorisms, essays. Her poetry was considered ‘difficult’, thus she gained wide audience as late as in the 1990s. Rekola's production has not really been the subject of research until after the mid-1990s. Liisa Enwald's 1997 dissertation Kaiken liikkeessä lepo contributed to pioneering research. In 2020, the Runopuu mural, painted by Teemu Mäenpää and produced by the Annikki Poetry Festival, was published in Tampere, as part of which is Rekola's poem "Minä rakastan sinua, minä sanon sen kaikille".

She died in Helsinki in 2014.

== Works ==
=== Poems ===
- Vedessä palaa (1954) ("It's Burning in the Water")
- Tunnit (1957) ("The Hours")
- Syksy muuttaa linnut (1961) ("Autumn Moves the Birds")
- Ilo ja epäsymmetria (1965) ("Joy and Asymmetry")
- Anna päivän olla kaikki (1968) ("Let the Day be Everything")
- Minä rakastan sinua, minä sanon sen kaikille (WSOY, 1972, ISBN 951-0-22849-4) ("I Love You, I Tell Everyone")
- Tuulen viime vuosi (1974) ("The Wind's Last Year")
- Kohtaamispaikka vuosi (1977) ("Meeting Place: Year")
- Runot 1954–1978] (1979)
- Kuutamourakka (1981) ("Moonlighting")
- Puun syleilemällä (1983) ("Embracing a Tree")
- Tuoreessa muistissa kevät (1987) ("In Fresh Memory the Spring")
- Maskuja (WSOY, 1987, ISBN 951-0-27282-5)
- Kuka lukee kanssasi (1990) ("Who Reads with You")
- Maa ilmaan heitetty (1995) ("Soil Thrown in the Air")
- Taivas päivystää (1996) ("The Sky's on Duty")
- Virran molemmin puolin. Runoja 1954–1996 (1997) ("On Both Sides of the River")
- Maskuja (2002)
- Valekuun reitti (2004) ("The Route of the False Moon")

=== Aphorisms ===
- Muistikirja (1969) ("Notebook")
- Maailmat lumen vesistöissä (1978) ("The Worlds in the Waters of Snow")
- Silmänkantama (1984) ("As Far as I Can See")
- Tuoreessa muistissa kevät, aforistiset kokoelmat (1998)
- Muistinavaruus (2000) ("The Space of Memory")

=== Translated books ===
- Glädje och asymmetri (1990), - Swedish
- Joie et asymetrie (1987), Ilo ja epäsymmetria - French
- 88 Poems (WSOY, 2000, ISBN 978-951-0-24783-9) - English, translated by Anselm Hollo
- Himmel aus blauem Feuer (2001) - German

== Awards ==
- Tampereen kaupungin kirjallisuuspalkinto 1958, 1962, 1965
- Valtion kirjallisuuspalkinto 1966, 1969, 1973, 1982
- Eino Leinon palkinto 1979
- Suomi-palkinto 1995
- Tanssiva karhu -palkinto 1997
- Vuoden runoilija -palkinto 1998
- Helsingin Yliopiston filosofisen tiedekunnan kunniatohtori 2000
- Alex Matson -palkinto 2003
- P. Mustapää -palkinto 2004

Nominees

- Neustadt International Prize for Literature 2000
- Tanssiva karhu -palkinto 2005
