= Deirdre Eberly Lashgari =

Deirdre Eberly Lashgari (April 7, 1941 – August 16, 2014) was an American English literature educator, editor and translator, a specialist in ethnic and world literatures who translated classical and modern Iranian poetry into English. Her pioneering work and leading contributions changed the literary curriculum at Berkeley and other institutes and universities in the United States of America and has normalized the presence of women's voices and writings as part of the syllabus in such departments.

== Education ==
Deirdre Eberly Lashgari was born in Ann Arbor, Michigan, on April 7, 1941. She graduated from Denton High School in 1959 and earned a bachelor's degree in English and French in 1963 from the University of North Texas, a Master of Arts in English in 1965, a Master of Arts in Near Eastern Languages in 1968, and a Doctor of Philosophy in Comparative Subjects Literature in 1987, the latter degrees from the University of California, Berkeley Lashgari was a Fulbright scholar in Iran in 1969 where she studied Western and folk influences on modern Iranian poetry and Iranian women's changing roles in cities and villages.

== Works ==
Lashgari is best known for her edited book Violence, Silence, and Anger: Women's Writing as Transgression (1995), which pays special attention to the works produced by well-known authors such as Harriet Jacobs, Virginia Woolf, Adrienne Rich and Audre Lord, as well Senegal's Mariama Ba, Lebanon's Etel Adnan, and Jamaica's Sistren Collective. The contributors to this book introduce the diverse areas of literary productions that embrace various forms of violence such as the colonial experiences of violence, sexual violence and war. They look into many forms of responses to violence and aim to address women's strategies of violating societal norms that confronts the readers with the realities of women's lives and their responses to violence.

She collaborated with (Bankier and Earnshaw, et al.) and edited two international poetry anthologies;The Other Voice: Women's Poetry in Translation (Norton, 1976) and Women Poets of The World (Macmillan, 1983). Her story of collectivist works is written in The Berkeley Literary Women's Revolution: Essays from Marsha's Salon (McFarland 2004).

In her article "Absurdity and Creation in the Work of Sadeq Hedayat" (1982), Lashgari criticizes Sadegh Hedayat for offering thoughts on problems without presenting solutions to those issues. She believes that Hedayat raises questions in his literary works but he leaves them with no answers. She raises her concerns for responsibility in Sadegh Hedayat's works but also thinks that Hedayat leaves his readers to experience and forces them to choose. Lashgari taught the first courses on women's literature. She researched and published Iranian fiction and cinema, female authors of fiction and poetry in countries such as United States, India, Iran, Ghana and China. She was professor emerita of English at California State Polytechnic University, Pomona.

== Personal life ==
Lashgari was married twice. She died on August 16, 2014, in Los Angeles at the age of 73.

== See also ==
- Women Poets International
- Third-World Feminism
- Persian literature in Western culture
- Persian literature
