= Henri Deluy =

French poet (1931–2021)

Henri Deluy (25 April 1931 – 20 July 2021) was a French poet.

Deluy was born in Marseille, France. When he was 13, growing up in Aix-en-Provence, he sent some of his poems to the local poet Blaise Cendrars. Cendrars responded by correcting some grammatical errors, which served to encourage Deluy. Five years later, Deluy interrupted his studies and hitchhiked to England, where he supported himself fruit-picking. He then decided to go to Sweden, but while travelling through the Netherlands, he met his first wife, who introduced him to a whole generation of ultra-modernist poets such as Adriaan Roland Holst, Lucebert, and Gerrit Kouwenaar. This proved to have a significant impact on his development as a writer, translator, and editor.

Henri Deluy was editor of Action poétique.

Deluy died in France on 20 July 2021.

== Selected works ==
- — (January 1996). Carnal Love: Poems. Sun & Moon Press. ISBN 978-1-55713-272-7.
