= Etel Adnan =

Lebanese-writer and artist (1925–2021)

- إيتيل عدنان
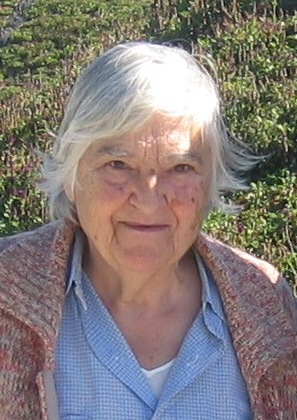
- Adnan in 2008
- Born: 24 February 1925; Beirut, Greater Lebanon, French Mandate for Syria and the Lebanon
- Died: 14 November 2021 (aged 96); Paris, France
- Education: University of Paris; University of California, Berkeley; Harvard University
- Occupations: Poet; essayist; novelist; visual artist
- Partner: Simone Fattal
- Writing career
- Language: French; English
- Genres: Poetry; essays; novels
- Notable works: Sitt Marie Rose; The Arab Apocalypse
- Notable awards: Lambda Literary Award (2013); Griffin Poetry Prize (2020)
- Movement: Hurufiyya movement

Etel Adnan (Arabic: إيتيل عدنان; 24 February 1925 – 14 November 2021) was a Lebanese poet, essayist, novelist, and visual artist, and the author of Sitt Marie Rose. In 2003, the academic journal MELUS called her "arguably the most celebrated and accomplished Arab author writing today".

In a 2021 obituary, ArtAsiaPacific wrote that Adnan was known in both literary and artistic circles and had become increasingly visible as a painter later in life; her work was exhibited internationally, including at documenta 13, the Whitney Biennial, and the Museum of Modern Art.

== Life ==
Etel N. Adnan was born in 1925 in Beirut, Lebanon. Adnan's mother, Rose "Lily" Lacorte, was Greek Orthodox from Smyrna and her father, Assaf Kadri, was a Muslim, and a high-ranking Ottoman officer from Damascus, Ottoman Syria, and whose mother was Albanian.

Adnan's father was a soldier who came from a wealthy family, she referred to him as an Arab in one interview, and as a Turk in another. He was a top officer and former classmate of Mustafa Kemal Atatürk at the military academy. In contrast, Adnan's mother was raised in extreme poverty; her parents met in Smyrna during World War I while her father was serving as an officer in Smyrna. Prior to marrying Adnan's mother, her father was already married with three children. After the Ottoman Empire collapsed, Adnan's parents migrated to Beirut. Adnan stated that her mother was 16 years old when she met her father, at a time when "the Greeks in Turkey were in concentration camps."

Adnan grew up in Beirut in a multilingual environment. She spoke Greek and Arabic with her parents, and later recalled that she also spoke Turkish until about the age of five; French became her primary language after she enrolled in a French Lebanese Catholic school at that age. Although Arabic was part of her early linguistic environment, Adnan wrote in French and English.

From 1945 to 1949, Adnan studied French literature at the École Supérieure des Lettres in Beirut, a predecessor to the later Saint Joseph University of Beirut's Faculty of Letters and Human Sciences. She then received a scholarship to study at the Sorbonne (then part of the University of Paris), where she earned a degree in philosophy. In 1955, she moved to the United States for postgraduate study in philosophy at the University of California, Berkeley, and Harvard University. From 1958 to 1972, she taught philosophy at Dominican College in San Rafael, California.

Adnan returned from the US to Lebanon and worked as a journalist and cultural editor for Al Safa newspaper, a French-language newspaper in Beirut. In addition, she also helped build the cultural section of the newspaper, occasionally contributing cartoons and illustrations. Her tenure at Al Safa was most notable for her front-page editorials, commenting on the important political issues of the day.

In her later years, Adnan began to openly identify as lesbian. She met her partner Simone Fattal in 1972 and the couple lived together until Adnan's death. The two of them worked together on The Post-Apollo Press which was founded by Fattal in 1982, and where Adnan was a vital contributor as an author and translator.

Adnan lived in Paris and Sausalito, California. She died in Paris on 14 November 2021, at the age of 96.

A documentary about Adnan's life by American filmmaker Marie Valentine Regan in collaboration with the artist, about "the last five years of her life", finished production in 2025.

== Visual art ==
Adnan also worked as a painter, her earliest abstract works were created using a palette knife to apply oil paint onto the canvas – often directly from the tube – in firm swipes across the picture's surface. The focus of the compositions often being a red square, she was interested in the "immediate beauty of colour". Adnan cited Paul Klee as an important early influence. Both artists were interested in making visual art in small formats, and utilising a range of media and expressive forms. Of Klee, she said, "'Klee belongs to the lineage of geniuses for whom a single designation, whether "painter", "musician" or "architect", is too narrow. Every painting by Klee is like an act of discovery, achieved through a process of exploration, like a boat in the ocean." In 2012, a series of the artist's brightly colored abstract paintings were exhibited as a part of documenta 13 in Kassel, Germany.

In the 1960s, she began integrating Arabic calligraphy into her artworks and her books, such as Livres d'Artistes [Artist's Books]. She recalls sitting for hours copying words from an Arabic grammar without trying to understand the meaning of the words. Her art was very much influenced by early hurufiyya artists, including Iraqi artist Jawad Salim, Palestinian writer and artist Jabra Ibrahim Jabra and Iraqi painter Shakir Hassan al Said, who rejected Western aesthetics and embraced a new art form which was both modern and yet referenced traditional culture, media and techniques.

Inspired by Japanese leporellos, Adnan also painted landscapes on foldable screens that can be "extended in space like free-standing drawings".

In 2014, a collection of the artist's paintings and tapestries were exhibited as a part of the Whitney Biennial at the Whitney Museum of American Art.

Adnan's retrospective at Mathaf: Arab Museum of Modern Art in Doha, Qatar, titled Etel Adnan In All Her Dimensions and curated by Hans Ulrich Obrist, featured eleven dimensions of Adnan's practice. It included her early works, her literature, her carpets, and others. The show was launched in March 2014, accompanied by a 580-page catalog of her work published jointly by Mathaf and Skira. The catalog was designed by artist Ala Younis in Arabic and English, and included text contributions by Simone Fattal, Daniel Birnbaum, Kaelen Wilson-Goldie, as well as six interviews with Hans-Ulrich Obrist.

In 2015, Adnan's paintings and tapestries were featured in Sharjah Biennial 12: The past, the present, the possible alongside works by Chung Chang Sup, Fahrelnissa Zeid, Abdul Hay Mosallam Zarara, and Saloua Raouda Choucair as well as contemporary artists such as Julie Mehretu, Haegue Yang, Taro Shinoda, Jac Leirner, and Adrian Villar Rojas, among others.

In 2017, Adnan's work was included in Making Space: Women Artists and Postwar Abstraction, a group exhibition organized by MoMA, which brought together prominent artists including Ruth Asawa, Gertrudes Altschul, Anni Albers, Magdalena Abakanowicz, Lygia Clark, and Lygia Pape, among others.

In 2018, MASS MoCA hosted a retrospective of the artist, titled A yellow sun A green sun a yellow sun A red sun a blue sun, including a selection of paintings in oil and ink, as well as a reading room of her written works. The exhibition explored how the experience of reading poetry differs from the experience of looking at a painting.

Published in 2018, Etel Adnan, a biography of the artist written by Kaelen Wilson-Goldie, inquires into the artist's work as a shaman and activist. In 2020, the Griffin Poetry Prize was awarded to her book Time.

Adnan's work was included in the 2021 exhibition Women in Abstraction at the Centre Pompidou. In 2023 her work was included in the exhibition Action, Gesture, Paint: Women Artists and Global Abstraction 1940-1970 at the Whitechapel Gallery in London.

Her work was included in the 2024 exhibition Making Their Mark: Works from the Shah Garg Collection at the Berkeley Art Museum and Pacific Film Archive (BAMPFA).

== Selected writings ==
- Adnan, Etel (1982). Sitt Marie Rose. Translated by Kleege, Georgina. Sausalito, California: The Post-Apollo Press. ISBN 978-0-942996-33-3.
- Adnan, Etel (1986). Journey to Mount Tamalpais: An Essay. Sausalito, California: The Post-Apollo Press. ISBN 978-0-942996-01-2. OCLC 13580272.
- Adnan, Etel (2007) [1989]. The Arab Apocalypse. Translated by Adnan, Etel (3rd ed.). The Post-Apollo Press. ISBN 978-0-942996-60-9.
- Adnan, Etel (1993). Of Cities and Women: Letters to Fawwaz. Sausalito, California: The Post-Apollo Press. ISBN 978-0-942996-21-0. OCLC 32061210.
- Adnan, Etel (2005). In the Heart of the Heart of Another Country. San Francisco: City Lights Books. ISBN 978-0-87286-446-7.
- Adnan, Etel (2008). Seasons. The Post-Apollo Press. ISBN 978-0-942996-66-1.
- Adnan, Etel (2012). Sea and Fog. Nightboat Books. ISBN 978-0-9844598-7-2.
- Adnan, Etel (2014). Donovan, Thom; Shimoda, Brandon; Alcalay, Ammiel; Swensen, Cole (eds.). To look at the sea is to become what one is: An Etel Adnan Reader. Nightboat Books. ISBN 978-1-937658-21-2.
- Adnan, Etel (2016). Night. Nightboat Books. ISBN 978-1-937658-53-3.
- Adnan, Etel (2018). Surge. Nightboat Books. ISBN 978-1-937658-85-4.
- Adnan, Etel (18 June 2019). Time. Translated by Riggs, Sarah. Nightboat Books. ISBN 978-1-64362-004-6.
- Adnan, Etel (27 October 2020). Shifting the Silence. Nightboat Books. ISBN 978-1-64362-030-5.

== Selected exhibitions ==
The following is a selection of notable solo and group exhibitions.

- 2012: documenta 13, Kassel, Germany.
- 2014: Etel Adnan in All Her Dimensions, Mathaf: Arab Museum of Modern Art, Doha, Qatar.
- 2014: Whitney Biennial, Whitney Museum of American Art, New York.
- 2015: Sharjah Biennial 12: The Past, the Present, the Possible, Sharjah Art Foundation, United Arab Emirates.
- 2016: The Weight of the World, Serpentine Galleries, London.
- 2017: Sea and Fog, Oakville Galleries, Oakville, Canada.
- 2018: New Work: Etel Adnan, San Francisco Museum of Modern Art, San Francisco.
- 2019: Etel Adnan et les modernes, Mudam Luxembourg.
- 2019: Etel Adnan: Each day is a whole world, Aspen Art Museum, Aspen, Colorado.
- 2020: The uprising of colors, Sfeir-Semler Gallery, Beirut, Lebanon.
- 2021: Etel Adnan: Light's New Measure, Solomon R. Guggenheim Museum, New York.
- 2022: Etel Adnan / Vincent van Gogh: Kleur als Taal, Van Gogh Museum, Amsterdam.

== Awards and recognition ==
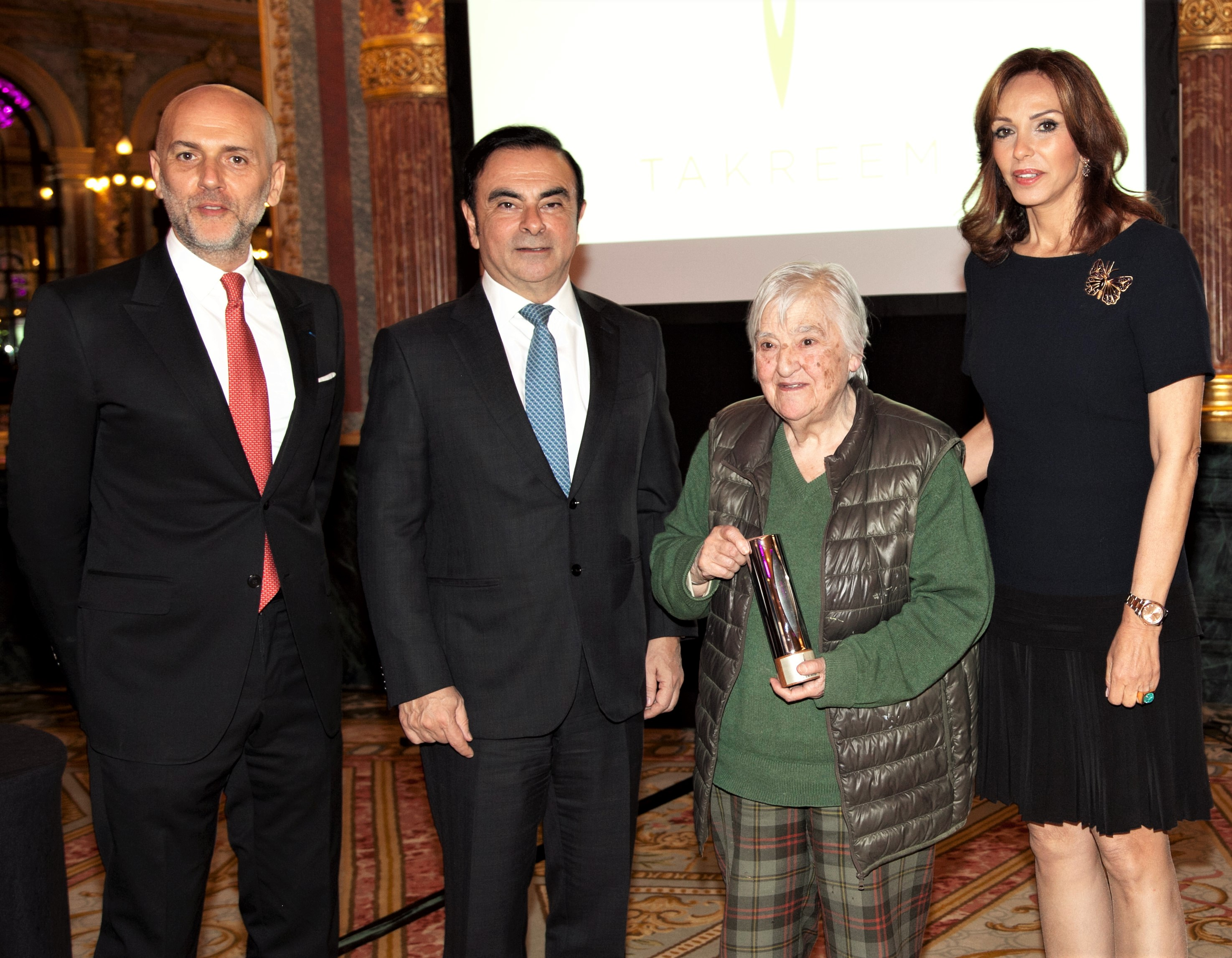
Etel Adnan in Paris in 2016 after receiving a lifetime achievement award.

- 1977: Awarded the France-Pays Arabes award for her novel Sitt Marie Rose.
- 2010: Awarded the Arab American Book Awards for her story collection Master of the Eclipse.
- 2013: Her poetry collection Sea and Fog won the California Book Award for Poetry.
- 2013: Awarded the Lambda Literary Award.
- 2014: Named a Chevalier des Arts et des Lettres by the French Government.
- 2015: The Etel Adnan Poetry Prize, begun in 2015, is awarded annually by the University of Arkansas Press for "a first or second book of poetry, in English, by a writer of Arab heritage."
- 2020: The poetry collection Time, selections of Adnan's work translated from French by Sarah Riggs, wins the Griffin Poetry Prize.
- 2024: On 15 April 2024, Google celebrated her with a Google Doodle.

== Bibliography ==
- Amireh, Amal; "Bearing Witness: The Politics of Form in Etel Adnan's Sitt Marie Rose." Critique: Critical Middle Eastern Studies, 2005 Fall; 14 (3): 251–63. (journal article)
- Amyuni, Mona Takieddine. "Etel Adnan & Hoda Barakat: De-Centered Perspectives, Subversive Voices." IN: Poetry's Voice-Society's Norms: Forms of Interaction between Middle Eastern Writers and Their Societies. Ed. Andreas Pflitsch and Barbara Winckler. Wiesbaden, Germany: Reichert; 2006. pp. 211–21
- Cassidy, Madeline. "'Love Is a Supreme Violence': The Deconstruction of Gendered Space in Etel Adnan's Sitt Marie Rose." IN: Violence, Silence, and Anger: Women's Writing as Transgression. Ed. Deirdre Lashgari. Charlottesville: UP of Virginia; 1995. pp. 282–90
- Champagne, John G. "Among Good Christian Peoples: Teaching Etel Adnan's Sitt Marie Rose." College Literature, 2000 Fall; 27 (3): 47–70.
- Fernea, Elizabeth. "The Case of Sitt Marie Rose: An Ethnographic Novel from the Modern Middle East." IN: Literature and Anthropology. Ed. Philip Dennis and Wendell Aycock. Lubbock: Texas Tech UP; 1989. pp. 153–164
- Foster, Thomas. "Circles of Oppression, Circles of Repression: Etel Adnan's Sitt Marie Rose." PMLA: Publications of the Modern Language Association of America, 1995 Jan; 110 (1): 59–74.
- Ghandour, Sabah. "Gender, Postcolonial Subject, and the Lebanese Civil War in Sitt Marie Rose." IN: The Postcolonial Crescent: Islam's Impact on Contemporary Literature. Ed. John C. Hawley. New York, NY: Peter Lang; 1998. pp. 155–65
- Hajjar, Jacqueline A. "Death, Gangrene of the Soul, in Sitt Marie Rose by Etel Adnan." Revue Celfan/Celfan Review, 1988 May; 7 (3): 27–33.
- Hartman, Michelle. "'This Sweet/Sweet Music': Jazz, Sam Cooke, and Reading Arab American Literary Identities." MELUS: The Journal of the Society for the Study of the Multi-Ethnic Literature of the United States, 2006 Winter; 31 (4): 145–65.
- Karnoub, Elisabeth. "'Une Humanité qui ne cesse de crucifier le Christ': Réécriture du sacrifice christique dans Sitt Marie Rose de Etel Adnan." IN: Victims and Victimization in French and Francophone Literature. Ed. Buford Norman. Amsterdam, Netherlands: Rodopi; 2005. pp. 59–71
- Kilpatrick, Hilary. "Interview with Etel Adnan (Lebanon)." IN: Unheard Words: Women and Literature in Africa, the Arab World, Asia, the Caribbean and Latin America. Ed. Mineke Schipper. Trans. Barbara Potter Fasting. London: Allison & Busby; 1985. pp. 114–120
- Layoun, Mary N. "Translation, Cultural Transgression and Tribute, and Leaden Feet." IN: Between Languages and Cultures: Translation and Cross-Cultural Texts. Ed. Anuradha Dingwaney and Carol Maier. Pittsburgh, PA: U of Pittsburgh P; 1995. pp. 267–89
- Majaj, Lisa Suhair. "Voice, Representation and Resistance: Etel Adnan's Sitt Marie Rose." Intersections: Gender, Nation and Community in Arab Women's Novels. Ed. Lisa Suhair Majaj, Paula W. Sunderman and Therese Saliba. Syracuse, NY: Syracuse Univ. Press, 2002. 200–230.
- Majaj, Lisa Suhair and Amal Amireh. Etel Adnan: Critical Essays on the Arab-American Writer and Artist. Jefferson, North Carolina: McFarland and Co, 2002.
- Marie, Elisabeth Anne. Sacrifice, sacrifiée, sacrificatrice: L'étrange triptyque: Sacrifices au féminin dans trois romans francophones libanais. Dissertation Abstracts International, Section A: The Humanities and Social Sciences, 2003 May; 63 (11): 3961. U of North Carolina, Chapel Hill, 2002.
- Mejcher-Atassi, Sonja. "Breaking the Silence: Etel Adnan's Sitt Marie Rose and The Arab Apocalypse." IN: Poetry's Voice-Society's Norms: Forms of Interaction between Middle Eastern Writers and Their Societies. Ed. Andreas Pflitsch and Barbara Winckler. Wiesbaden, Germany: Reichert; 2006. pp. 201–10
- Mustafa, Daliya Sa'id (translator). "Al-Kitabah bi-lughah ajnabiyyah." Alif: Journal of Comparative Poetics, 2000; 20: 133-43 (Arabic section); 300-01 (English section).
- Muzaffar, May. "Iytil 'Adnan: Qarinat al-nur wa-al-ma'." Arabi, 2007 Feb; 579: 64–68.
- Obank, Margaret. "Private Syntheses and Multiple Identities." Banipal: Magazine of Modern Arab Literature, 1998 June; 2: 59–61.
- Shoaib, Mahwash. "Surpassing Borders and 'Folded Maps': Etel Adnan's Location in There." Studies in the Humanities, 2003 June-Dec; 30 (1-2): 21–28.
- "Vitamin P3." Phaidon Press, 2017. ISBN 978-0-7148-7145-5
- Willis, Mary-Angela. "Francophone Literature of the Middle East by Women: Breaking the Walls of Silence." IN: Francophone Post-Colonial Cultures: Critical Essays. Ed. Kamal Salhi. Lanham, MD: Lexington; 2003. pp. 64–74
- Willis, Mary-Angela. La Guerre démasquée à travers la voix féminine dans Sitt Marie Rose d'Etel Adnan et Coquelicot du massacre d'Evelyne Accad. Dissertation Abstracts International, Section A: The Humanities and Social Sciences, 2002 Mar; 62 (9): 3061. U of Alabama, 2001.

== Influence on other artists ==
- Jassem Hindi, Laundry of Legends II, a dance performance based on her poem The Arab Apocalypse
