= Danielle Bleitrach =

French sociologist (born 1938)

- Born: 1938 (age 87–88)
- Occupations: Sociologist, Journalist, Essayist, Novelist
- Title: Maître de conférences

Academic background
- Education: University of Provence

Academic work
- Discipline: Sociologist
- Institutions: Aix-Marseille University
- Main interests: Cuba, Ukraine, Nazism

Danielle Bleitrach (born 1938) is a French sociologist and journalist. From the 1970s through the end of the century, she was CNRS researcher and lecturer at the Aix-Marseille University, focusing on the sociology of the working class and urbanization. From 1981 to 1996 she was a member of the Central Committee of the Communist Party of France, then the National Committee of the Party. She was also assistant editor-in-chief of the party weekly Révolution. She has contributed to La Pensée, Les Temps Modernes and Le Monde Diplomatique. In the 2000s and 2010s, after retiring from teaching, she co-authored texts on Cuba, Nazism and Ukraine.

== Early life ==
Born in 1938 to a Jewish family, Bleitrach's early childhood was marked by "the flight from nazism." In September 1943, she and her family were refugees in Cannes during the German Occupation of France and she narrowly escaped a round-up by the Gestapo in the Palace Bellevue where refugees were housed.

In the 1960s, Bleitrach was a student at the University of Provence at Aix-en-Provence. She earned a licence (bachelor's degree) in history followed in 1966 by a diplôme d'études supérieures (master of arts degree) with a focus on Provençal medieval religious iconography. The 1967 Revue d'histoire de l'Eglise de France found that "her description of the sculptures of the Montmajour and Saint-Paul de Mausole cloisters was a fine job and her study of religious mentalities was interesting."

Her thèse de 3e cycle (doctoral dissertation) in urban sociology (Structure sociale et organisation urbaine : les élus locaux et les actions régionales d'aménagement), presented in 1972, dealt with the attitude of French local elected officials to regional development policies.

== Career ==
=== Academic career ===
In 1972-73 and 1973–74, Bleitrach delivered a course on "the sociology of the State" at the Grenoble Institute of Political Studies.

Bleitrach was part of the (Marxist) French School of urban sociology. She was involved with the Laboratoire de sociologie industrielle (Laboratory of Industrial Sociology) at the sociology and ethnology department of the University of Provence, at Aix-en-Provence.

She was an assistant lecturer (maître assistant) then lecturer (maître de conférences) at the Aix-Marseille University. She was also a member of the National Committee of the Centre national de la recherche scientifique.

Bleitrach co-authored several books and articles on the sociology of the working class and urbanization.

- L'usine et la vie: luttes régionales, Marseille et Fos, co-written with Alain Chenu (1979), a close collaborator in the 1970s and early 1980s, is an enquiry concerning more than 5,000 workers in the Fos-sur-Mer zone and numerous businesses (steel industry, petrochemical industry, metallurgy, etc.) and aiming at demonstrating how lifestyles contribute to the creation of different types of workers.
- Classe ouvrière et social démocratie : Lille et Marseille, co-written with Jean Lojkine et alii (1981), has been reviewed by Madeleine Rebérioux in Annales. Économies, Sociétés, Civilisations, and by Alain Bergounioux in Le Mouvement social : bulletin trimestriel de l'Institut français d'histoire sociale. Rebérioux points out that the book results from the collective work of a team of five sociologists. Although the share of each researcher is not specified, Bleitrach's analyses — as already outlined in L'Usine et la vie — are recognizable. By choosing as the subject of their research two large towns run by socialists for nearly a century, the co-authors barely conceal their thesis: the reformist movement has managed to contain workers' struggles within the factory or in urban ghettoes by means of specific municipal policies and an array of local societies geared to dealing with every aspect of daily life outside work. The urban municipality run by social democrats is construed as a place where a mode of political control which emerged in the late 19th century was meant to channel the revolutionary movement within the framework of a Republican consensus. For Bergounioux, Classe ouvrière et social démocratie provides, as a socio-political study, a valuable insight into the evolution of the two municipal policies and the complex role of modern community workers although its intent is predominantly political. As recent legislative elections have shown, a number of communist-run local councils too, have been affected by electoral attrition. An analysis, albeit brief, of the "hegemonic system" of communist municipalities would not have been amiss and would have made a number of pages look less accusatory. The authors start from the assumption that socialism (social democracy) follows a predetermined political pattern, at once expressing and betraying the working class, whose struggle is fully revealed only by the communist party. Classe ouvrière et social démocratie is also mentioned by Pierre-Paul Zaho in "D'impossibles notables ? Les grandes familles de Marseille face à la politique (1860-1970)". Zaho observes that Bleitrach and Lojkine claim that in Marseille "an explicit or tacit pact depending on the period, ensures that the control of economic power and urban management goes to the bourgeoisie and leaves political and social power to the non-communist left".
- Défaite ouvrière et exclusion, co-written with Mustapha El Miri (2000), is a study of the trajectory of 500 minimum wage workers in Marseille. It calls into question the methodology of exclusion. For the authors, exclusion manifests itself in the defeat of workers during the 1980s and corresponds with globalization, which multiplied inequalities not only in the Third World but within advanced industrial countries by putting downward pressure on salaries, in particular those of unskilled workers. Driven from their countries of origin, a migrant labour force from rural areas often encountered this situation and the class was defeated; moreover, this defeat is characterized by less collectivity : unemployment, precariousness, and the growth of informal urbanization.
- In "Planification territoriale, dynamique métropolitaine et innovation institutionnelle : la Région Urbaine de Lyon" (in Politiques et management public, 1998, Vol. 16, N. 1), Bernard Jouve refers to Danielle Bleitrach and Alain Chenu's 1974 publication Aménagements : régulation ou aggravation des contradictions sociales as "an analysis, developed from the perspective of the Marxist urban sociology of the 1970s, of both the balanced metropolises and the work of OREAMs [Organisations d'Etude et d'Aménagement de l'Aire Métropolitaine], tools for domination designed by the State to locally meet the requirements of monopolistic capitalism."
- In Les Annales de la recherche urbaine (1978, Vol. 1, N. 1, pp. 80–89), Elizabeth Campagnac devotes a whole paragraph (p. 84) of her article "Mobilité et transformation des modes de vie ouvriers" to her indebtness to Danielle Bleitrach and Alain Chenu's research work on three main types of workers found in a number of factories in the Marseille region: "their work analyses differentiations in workers' modes of living in terms of rank in division of labour, nature and type of qualifications in a broad sense, the formation of which depends largely on the conditions of reproduction within the family unit and the social environment – in terms of what D. Bleitrach and A. Chenu call the hegemonic mode of capital in relation to the various segments of the working class. They thus manage to bring out what is at the core of the unity of life in the workplace and life outside the workplace".
- In "Sur quelques ouvrages relatifs à la sidérurgie [note bibliographique]," published in Revue d'économie industrielle (1979, Vol. 8, N. 1, pp. 124–129), A. Dahmani, M. Villard and B. Loustalet provide a short summary of D. Bleitrach, A. Chenu, "Aménagement : régulation ou aggravation des contradictions sociales ?" (in Aménagement du territoire et développement régional, Vol. 7, 1974, Grenoble, Documentation française, pp. 186–214.): "The authors try to bring out the sociological importance of development as currently implemented in France; to that effect, they compare official choices as expressed in planning documents (doctrines, projects, etc.) and a specific case, namely Fos-sur-Mer and the Marseille metropolitan area. Their approach revolves round the following points: the policies of territorial planning and development in France [...], the case of Fos-sur-Mer [...], the urban environment of Fos-sur-Mer's plant and finally [...] the sociological meaning of that development. In their analysis, the creation of the iron and steel complex is construed as a capitalist test of territorial development."
- In Capital Accumulation and Regional Development in France, first published in the journal Geoforum (1979, Vol. 10, N. 1) and reprinted in S.S. Duncan (ed.), Qualitative Change in Human Geography (Pergamon Press, 2013, pp. 81–108), M. Dunford discusses at length Bleitrach and Chenu's article "L'aménagement : régulation ou approfondissement des contradictions sociales? Un exemple: Fos-sur-Mer et l'aire métropolitaine marseillaise" (in Environment and Planning A, 1975, 7, pp. 367–391) (see pp. 98, 99, 102, 106): "BLEITRACH and CHENU (1975) make a number of important points about the nature of planning in contemporary France. They argue that the Plan is an instrument of general planning between fractions of the dominant class which results in an effective programming of certain activities and an agreement on the broad aspects of government policy. They also point out that in the formulation of the Plan it is changes in the nature of private interests which give rise to new forms of state intervention and not vice-versa. State intervention involves a subordination of public to private interests and not private to public interests (pp. 379-380)."

In the 2000s, Bleitrach's work focused on the geographic areas of Cuba and Latin America. Here she departed from her previous sociological analyses but continued to pursue a reflection on globalization, development, work and urbanization.

- In 2004, she co-authored Cuba est une île (2004) with Viktor Dedaj; Le Monde Diplomatique described the book as "infinitely more serious than numerous works that treat the same topic," and while warning readers would not find an examination not just of the "successes, but also the failures" of the Cuban revolution, said the book nevertheless offered an important contribution as an historical account from the Cuban point of view.
- Bleitrach's 2006 Les États-Unis de mal empire, co-authored with Viktor [Dedaj] and Maxime Vivas, continued to "observe North-South relations from Latin America," discussing the emerging resistance from various South American countries to the policies of the "American empire"; Le Monde Diplomatique praised the book as "bountiful".
- In 2008, with Jacques-François Bonaldi, she published a third text related to these questions, called Cuba, Fidel et le Che; ou, l'aventure du socialisme. Cuba, Fidel et Le Che engages Fidel Castro and Che Guevara's critiques to examine the different phases of history in Cuba, and the lessons they might offer other Latin American countries in the present.

In 2015, Bleitrach's attention turned to nazism. She co-authored, with Richard Gehrke, an essay called Bertolt Brecht et Fritz Lang. Le nazisme n’a jamais été éradiqué. The book analyzes Lang's film based on a story by Bretcht, Hangmen Also Die! The same year, she co-authored, with Marianne Dunlop, URSS vingt ans après : retour de l'Ukraine en guerre, a book reporting the testimonies of interviewees in Odesa and Crimea after the Maidan Revolution.

Bleitrach is among the 378 French scholars in human and social sciences listed with their respective bibliographies in Serigne Magaye Cissé's Recueil bibliographique en sciences humaines et sociales (2013).

=== Political and journalism career ===
Bleitrach joined the French Communist Party, or PCF, at the age of fifteen. She was a member of the Central Committee, then the National Committee of the party from 1981 to 1996, when she resigned on the basis of her belief that the conditions for participating in the government had not been met.

As assistant editor-in-chief of the Communist Party's daily publication, Révolution, her articles linked sociology and journalistic intervention.

In 2003, Bleitrach left the PCF. While still considering herself a communist, she refrained from joining any party until January 2016 when she decided to apply again for membership.

=== Other projects ===
Bleitrach wrote an about intellectuals Music hall des âmes nobles (Music Hall of the Noble Spirits), a memoir about her husband Un bouquet d'orties (A Bouquet of Nettles), and two novels: L'infortune de Gaspard (Gaspard's Misfortune) and Les enfants du mauvais temps (Children of the Bad Weather).

In her retirement, Bleitrach maintains a personal blog, Histoire et société, after creating an earlier one called Changement de société in the 2000s.

== Bibliography ==
=== Books and book chapters ===
- with Alain Chenu, Paul Bouffartigue, J. Broda, Y. Ronchi, Production et consommation dans la structuration des pratiques de déplacement : les modes de vie des ouvriers des zones industrielles de Fos et de Vitrolles, Centre de recherche d'économie des transports (CRET), Université d'Aix-Marseille, 1977, 370 p.
- with Alain Chenu, L'usine et la vie : luttes régionales : Marseille et Fos, Paris, François Maspéro, collection "Luttes sociales," 1979, 217 p.
- with Alain Chenu, Espace urbain, transports et mode de vie, contrat DGRST, Université d'Aix-Marseille II, 1980, multig.
- with Jean Lojkine, Ernest Oary, Roland Delacroix, Christian Mahieu, Classe ouvrière et social-démocratie : Lille et Marseille, collection « Problèmes », Paris, Éditions sociales, 1981, 329 p.
- with Dominique Bari, Pierre Durand, Anne Etchégarray, et alii, Aujourd'hui les femmes, with an introduction by Gisèle Moreau, Paris, Éditions sociales, 1981, 233 p.
- with Gaston Plissonnier, Une vie pour lutter : entretiens avec Danielle Bleitrach, Paris, Éditions sociales, 1984, 223 p.
- Le Music-hall des âmes nobles : essai sur les intellectuels, Paris, Éditions sociales, collection "Notre temps / Mémoire," 1984, 190 p. (essay) ISBN 2-209-05558-X
- Un bouquet d'orties, Paris, Messidor, 1990, 212 p. (memorial book) ISBN 2-209-06283-7
- with Mustapha El Miri, Défaite ouvrière et exclusion, L'Harmattan, 2000, 220 p. ISBN 2-7384-9287-8
- with Viktor Dedaj, Cuba est une île, with contributions by Jacques-François Bonaldi, Éditions Le Temps des cerises, 2004, 272 p. (translated into Spanish in 2005 by Maira Góngora Ricardo and published under the title Cuba es una isla by Ediciones De Intervención Cultural in 2005) ISBN 2-84109-499-5
- with Viktor Dedaj and Maxime Vivas, Les États-Unis de Mal Empire, ces leçons de résistance qui nous viennent du Sud, Éditions Aden, 2005, 285 p. (translated into Spanish in 2007 by Aurora Fibla Madrigal and published under the title Estados Unidos o el imperio de mal en peor by Ed. José Martí, La Habana, in 2006)
- with Jacques-François Bonaldi, Cuba, Fidel et le Che, ou l’aventure du socialisme, Éditions Le Temps des cerises, 2008, 457 p. ISBN 978-2-84109-671-8
- with Maryse Marpsat, Pierre Concialdi, Catherine Delcroix, Maryse Esterle-Hedibel, Liane Mozère, Sociologie de la pauvreté, General Books LLC, 2010, 34 p.
- with Richard Gehrke, Nicole Amphoux and Julien Rebel, Bertolt Brecht et Fritz Lang. Le nazisme n’a jamais été éradiqué, La Madeleine, LettMotif, 2015, 410 p. (essay) ISBN 978-2-36716-130-3, ISBN 978-2-36716-122-8
- with Marianne Dunlop, URSS vingt ans après : retour de l'Ukraine en guerre, Éditions Delga, 2015, 241 p. (translated into Esperanto under the title USSR Dudek Jarojn Poste: Reveno El Ukrainujo En Milito, Bouquinette Callicephale, 2016, 242 p.) ISBN 978-2-915854-78-7
- Le Zugzwang - La Fin du libéralisme libertaire, et après? Éditions Delga, Paris 2026, 185 p., ISBN 978-2-37607-287-4

=== Novels ===
- Les infortunes de Gaspard, Paris, Messidor, 1991, 260 p. (novel) ISBN 2-209-06487-2
- Les enfants du mauvais temps, Paris, Scandéditions, 1993, 420 p. (novel) ISBN 2-209-06792-8

=== Journal articles ===
- with Alain Chenu, "Le rôle idéologique des actions régionales d'aménagement du territoire. L'exemple de l'aire métropolitaine marseillaise," in Espaces et Sociétés, 1971, N. 4, pp. 43–55
- with Alain Chenu, "Aménagement : régulation ou aggravation des contradictions sociales ? Un exemple: Fos-Sur-Mer et l'aire métropolitaine marseillaise," in Aménagement du territoire et développement régional, Grenoble, Institut d'études politiques, Documentation française, 1974, vol. 7, pp. 185–214
- with Alain Chenu, "Les notables et les technocrates," in Cahiers internationaux de sociologie, vol. LXI, 1974, pp. 159–175
- with Alain Chenu, "L'aménagement : régulation ou approfondissement des contradictions sociales? Un exemple: Fos-Sur-Mer et l'aire métropolitaine marseillaise," in Environment and Planning A, June 1975, vol. 7, N. 4, pp. 367–391 (Abstract)
- "Région métropolitaine et appareils hégémoniques locaux," in Espaces et Sociétés, March–June 1977, pp. 5–14
- "Des changements à prendre en considération," in Cahiers du communisme, February 1980
- with Alain Chenu, "Modes of domination and everyday life: some notes on recent research," in City, Class and Capital, 1981, pp. 105–114 (English translation of a 1978 conference paper entitled Vie quotidienne et modes d'hégémonie, see section "Conference papers" below)
- "Jdanov a-t-il changé de camp ?," in La Pensée (Paris), N. 237, January 1984, pp. 125–126
- with Alain Chenu, "Le travail intellectuel dans la production," in La Pensée (Paris), N. 240, July–August 1984
- "L'aveu d'Heiner Müller. Entretien avec Maurice Taszman," in Révolution, N. 689, 13, May 1993, pp. 20–21
- with Sophie Bava, "Islam et pouvoir au Sénégal – Les Mourides entre utopie et capitalisme," in Le monde diplomatique, Paris, Karthala, novembre 1995, p. 21
- "Le zapatisme est-il un anti-léninisme ?," in Les Temps modernes, N. 590, October–November 1996, pp. 1–35
- "Autour du manifeste [de Karl Marx]," in La Pensée (Paris), N. 313, 1998, pp. 5–88

=== Conference papers ===
- with Alain Chenu, "Vie quotidienne et modes d'hégémonie," 9th world congress of sociology, Uppsala University, Sweden, August 14–19, 1978, 16 p.

=== Reviews ===
- with Alain Chenu, "Monopolville. Une étape importante dans la recherche sociologique," in International Journal of Urban and Regional Research, March–December 1977, Vol. 1, Issue 1-4, pp. 173–179

== Personal life ==
Bleitrach's second husband was Pascal Fieschi, a communist trade union and party official and former Resistance organizer in Aix-en-Provence whom she had met in 1958. The leader of the failed 1944 attempted escape of 1200 resistants from the Eysses prison at Villeneuve-sur-Lot, Lot-et-Garonne, he was deported to Dachau.

== See also ==
- Urban sociology
- Globalization
- Sociology of politics
