= Andrei Voznesensky =

Soviet and Russian poet (1933–2010)

- Андрей Вознесенский
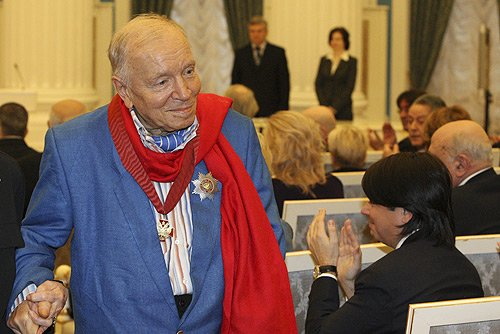
- Voznesensky in 2008
- Born: 12 May 1933; Moscow, Russian SFSR, Soviet Union
- Died: 1 June 2010 (aged 77); Peredelkino, Leninsky District, Moscow Oblast, Russia (now Novomoskovsky Administrative Okrug, Moscow)
- Resting place: Novodevichy Cemetery, Moscow
- Occupations: Poet and writer
- Spouse: Zoya Boguslavskaya (m. 1964)
- Writing career
- Period: 1958–2010
- Notable works: The Triangular Pear, Antiworlds, Stained-glass Master, Violoncello Oakleaf, Videoms and Fortune Telling by the Book
Notable awards

Order of the Red Banner of Labour
Several others (see below)
- Literary movement: Sixtiers

Andrei Andreyevich Voznesensky (Russian: Андрей Андреевич Вознесенский, 12 May 1933 – 1 June 2010) was a Soviet and Russian poet and writer who had been referred to by Robert Lowell as "one of the greatest living poets in any language." He was one of the "Children of the '60s," a new wave of iconic Soviet intellectuals led by the Khrushchev Thaw.

Voznesensky was considered "one of the most daring writers of the Soviet era" but his style often led to regular criticism from his contemporaries and he was once threatened with expulsion by Nikita Khrushchev. He performed poetry readings in front of sold-out stadiums around the world, and was much admired for his skilled delivery. Some of his poetry was translated into English by W. H. Auden. Voznesensky's long-serving mentor and muse was Boris Pasternak, the Nobel Laureate and the author of Doctor Zhivago.

Before his death, he was both critically and popularly proclaimed "a living classic", and "an icon of Soviet intellectuals".

== Personal life ==
Voznesensky was born on 12 May 1933, in Moscow. His father, Andrei Nikolaevich Voznesensky (1903–1974) was a professor of engineering, while his mother influenced him early on by reading poetry in his presence. His father worked during World War II.

In his early life, Voznesensky was fascinated with painting and architecture, in 1957 graduating from the Moscow Architectural Institute with a degree in engineering. His enthusiasm for poetry, though, proved to be stronger. While still a teenager, he sent his poems to Boris Pasternak; the friendship between the two had a strong influence on the young poet, and he later described this relationship in "I Am Fourteen" – "From that day on, my life took on a magical meaning and a sense of destiny; his new poetry, telephone conversations, Sunday chats at his house from 2 to 4, walks—years of happiness and childish adoration". Pasternak, who died in 1960, paid him the ultimate tribute – "Your entrance into literature was swift and turbulent. I am glad I've lived to see it".

In later years Voznesensky became reclusive in nature. He suffered a stroke several years before his death. He is believed to have endured another stroke in early 2010.

On 1 June 2010, Voznesensky died at the age of 77. The secretary of Union of Writers of Russia, Gennady Ivanov, announced that he had died in his home in a peaceful manner. A cause of death went unprovided. Russian President Dmitry Medvedev wrote a letter of condolences. A telegram by Russian Prime Minister Vladimir Putin said Voznesensky had "truly become a person of dominant influence". Other senior Russian officials and cultural entities also offered many tributes.

Voznesensky's wife, Zoya Boguslavskaya, outlived him. He was buried in the Moscow Novodevichy Cemetery on 4 June 2010.

== Career ==
Voznesensky's style was considered different from his contemporaries in the Soviet Union.

His first poems were published in 1958, and these immediately reflected his unique style. His lyrics are characterized by his tendency "to measure" the contemporary person by modern categories and images, by the eccentricity of metaphors, by the complex rhythmical system and sound effects. Vladimir Mayakovsky and Pablo Neruda have been cited among the poets who influenced him most.

The Goya-inspired "I Am Goya" was an early Voznesensky effort, and went on to achieve considerable recognition for its impressions of the fear and horror attached to war, as demonstrated by its Russian metaphors and recurring "g" sounds. Another early poem, "Fire in the Architecture Institute", was inspired by a 1957 night fire at the Institute of Architecture in Moscow. Voznesensky later said: "I believe in symbols. I understood that architecture was burned out in me. I became a poet".

Voznesensky was one of several young Russian intellectuals whom Nikita Khrushchev invited to a reception hosted by the ruling Communist Party in December 1962. Khrushchev scathingly remarked on Voznesensky at the ceremony: "Just look at this new Pasternak! You want to get a [foreign] passport tomorrow? You want it? And then go away, go to the dogs! Go, go there". In 1963, his fame blossomed and he became "as popular as The Beatles" after Khrushchev publicly and falsely branded him a pervert.

In the 1960s, during the so-called Thaw, Voznesensky frequently travelled abroad: to France, Germany, Italy, the United States and other countries. The popularity of Voznesensky, Yevgeny Yevtushenko and Bella Akhmadulina was marked by their performances in front of the adoring crowds numbering in the thousands at stadiums, in concert halls and universities. In doing so, he served as "a sort of unofficial Kremlin cultural envoy", according to The New York Times. His poetry reading skills were profound. He competed with Laurence Olivier and Paul Scofield at one show in London. He criticized the 1968 invasion of Czechoslovakia. While in the United States, he met Allen Ginsberg, Arthur Miller, and Marilyn Monroe.

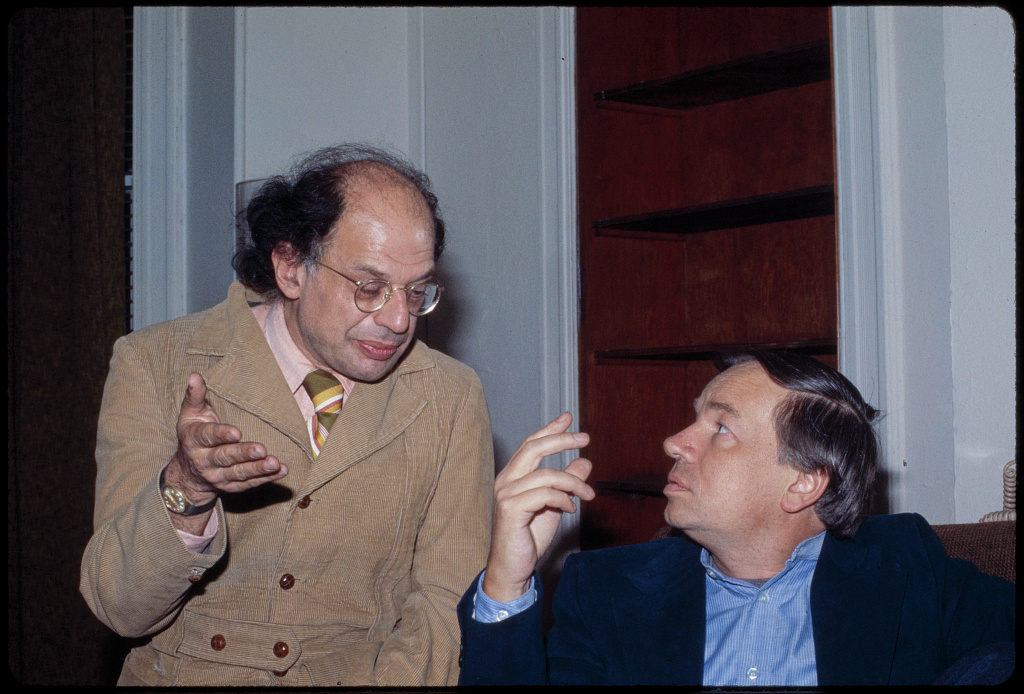
Voznesensky with Allen Ginsberg in 1978

Voznesensky's friendship with many contemporary writers, artists and other intellectuals is reflected in his poetry and essays. He is known to wider audiences for the superhit Million of Scarlet Roses that he penned for Alla Pugacheva in 1984 and for the hugely successful rock opera Juno and Avos (1979), based on the life and death of Nikolai Rezanov.

His creations have been turned into works of theatre. One collection of his poems, "Antimiry" ("Anti-worlds") served as the basis for a famous performance at the Taganka Theatre in 1965. "Save your Faces" was performed at the same venue. "Juno and Avos" was performed at the Lenin's Komsomol Theater (now Lenkom). Others on foreign territory.

Ukrainian composer Tamara Maliukova Sidorenko (1919–2005) set some of his poems to music.

=== Notable works ===
- The Triangular Pear (1962)
- First Ice
- Antiworlds (1964)
- Stained-glass Master
- Violoncello Oakleaf
- Videoms and Fortune Telling by the Book
- Arrow in the Wall (1986)
- I am Goya
- A Shallow Paradise
- Dogalypse
- The Parabolic Ballad
- The Antiworlds (1964)
- Glance (Vzglyad)
- My Friend's Light
- Her Story
- Russian-American Romance
- Abuses and Awards
- A Ballad (Thesis for a Doctor's Degree)
- Who Are You?
- Rubber Souls
- Fate
- Self-Portrait
- The Song
- Modern Nature
- Milion alykh roz (with music by Raimonds Pauls)
- Story Under Full Sail; A Story of Love and Loss
- Someone is Beating a Woman
- Dogalypse. San Francisco Poetry Reading City Lights Books, The Pocket Poets series: Number 29 (in English)
- The Shadow of the Sound (1970)
- Achilles' Heart (1966)
- Lonjumeau (1963)
- Oza (1964)

=== Awards and nominations ===
In 1978 Voznesensky was awarded the USSR State Prize. He is an honorable member of ten academies, including the Russian academy of learning (1993), the American Academy of Arts and Letters, Parisian Académie Goncourt and others.

On Tuesday, 23 December 2008, Russian President Dmitry Medvedev bestowed a state award upon Voznesensky at the Kremlin.

== Legacy ==
A minor planet 3723 Voznesenskij, discovered by Soviet astronomer Nikolai Chernykh in 1976, is named after him.

English critic John Bayley described his feelings after hearing a Voznesensky recitation of "I Am Goya":

Mr. Voznesensky's recitation of this poem was electrifying, but it may be that the element of performance bulked necessarily larger than the poem's emotional impact. Russian poetry has always inspired recitation and a rapt response from the reciter's audience, but Mr. Voznesensky, and his contemporary Yevgeny Yevtushenko, are perhaps the first Russian poets to exploit this in the actual process of composition—to write poems specifically for performing, as pop songs are written for electronic transmission by singers and band.

== Honours and awards ==
- Order "For Merit to the Fatherland";
  - 2nd class (5 May 2008) – for outstanding achievements in the development of literature and many years of creative activity
  - 3rd class (15 January 2004) – for outstanding contribution to the development of national literature
- Order of the Red Banner of Labour (1983)
- USSR State Prize (1978) – a collection of "stained glass maker" (1976)
- Prize of the Government of the Russian Federation in the field of culture (17 December 2010, Posthumously)
- Voznesensky is an honorary member of ten academies around the world, including the Russian Academy of Education (1993), the American Academy of Arts and Letters, the Bavarian Academy of Fine Arts, the Académie Goncourt and the European Academy of Poetry
- Golden Badge of Honour "Public Recognition" (2003)

== Translations ==
- Andrei Voznesensky.

Antiworlds and "The Fifth Ace". Ed. by Patricia Blake and Max Hayward. Bilingual edition. Garden City, NY: Anchor Books; Doubleday & Co., 1967.
