= Zoya Boguslavskaya =

Russian literary critic (1924–2026)

- Зоя Богуславская
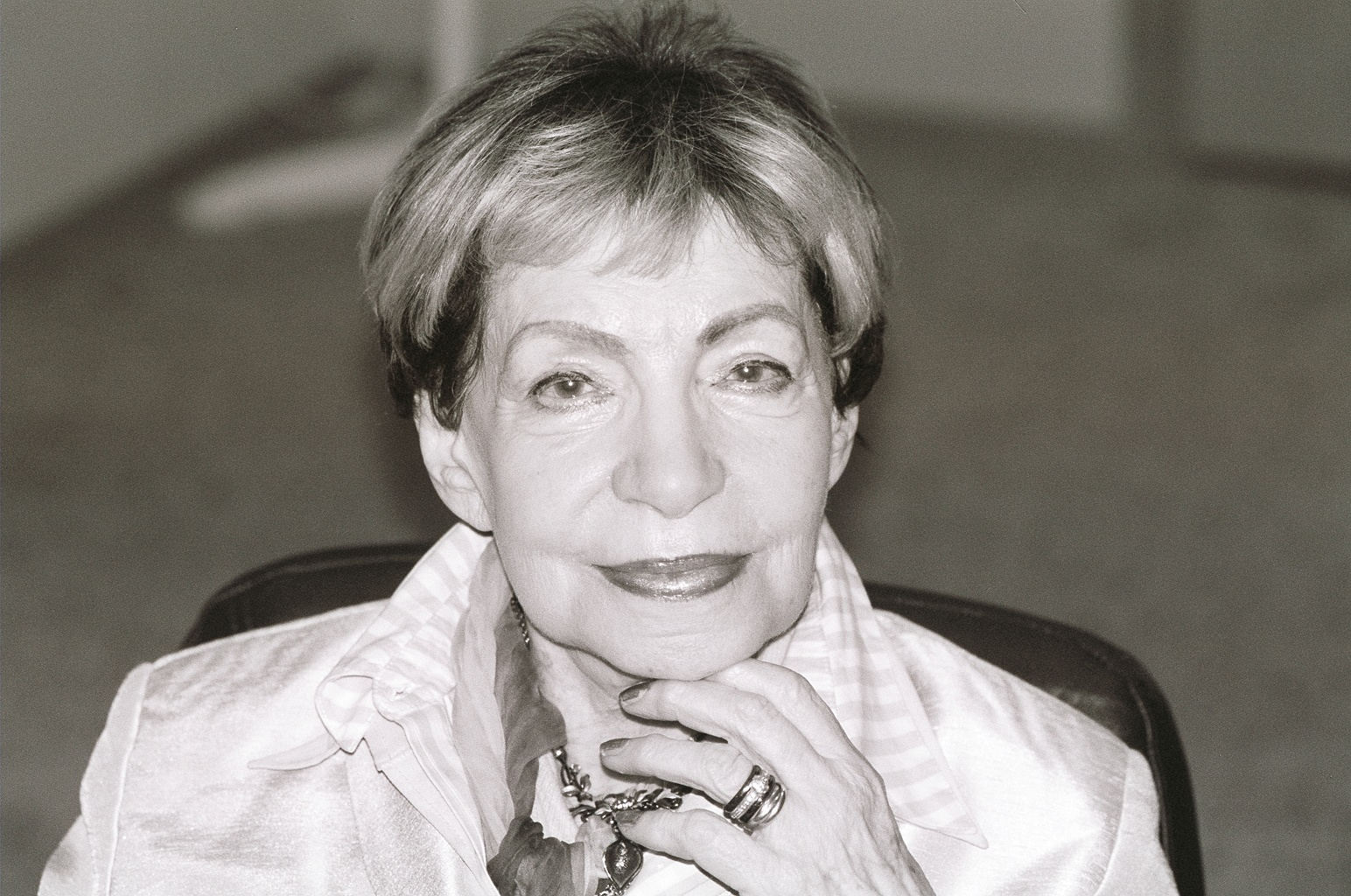
- Boguslavskaya in 2005
- Born: 16 April 1924; Moscow, Russian SFSR, Soviet Union
- Died: 14 May 2026 (aged 102)
- Spouse: Andrei Voznesensky (m. 1964; died 2010)
- Awards: Order "For Merit in Culture and Art"; Honoured Worker of Culture of Russia

Zoya Borisovna Boguslavskaya (Russian: Зоя Борисовна Богуславская; 16 April 1924 – 14 May 2026) was a Soviet and Russian poet, novelist, essayist, playwright, critic and author.

== Life and career ==
Boguslavskaya was born in Moscow on 16 April 1924, to Boris Lvovich Boguslavsky and Emma Iosifovna Boguslavskaya. She studied at the Moscow State Institute of Arts and Institute of History of Art. She had been affiliated with the Association of Women Writers of Russia, the Russian Writers' Union, the Internal Association of Women Writers in Paris, and the Russian Pen Centre.

She married poet Andrei Voznesensky in 1964. Boguslavskaya died on 14 May 2026, at the age of 102.

== Awards ==
- Russian Individual Triumph and Foundation Prize
- Order “For Merit in Culture and Art” (April 11, 2024) — for a major contribution to the development of national culture and art and many years of fruitful work.
- Honored Worker of Culture of the Russian Federation (April 16, 2019) — “for a major contribution to the development of national culture and art and many years of fruitful work.”
- Honorary Member of the Russian Academy of Arts (2019).
- Big Book Prize in the Non-Fiction category for the book A Negligent Life (2025).
