= Sitt Marie Rose =

Novel by Etel Adnan

- Author: Etel Adnan
- Translator: Georgina Kleege
- Language: English
- Genre: Novel
- Publisher: The Post-Apollo Press
- Publication date: 1978
- Publication place: France
- English publication date: 1982
- Media type: Print
- Pages: 105
- ISBN: 0-942996-33-X
- OCLC: 40719612

Sitt Marie Rose is a novel by Etel Adnan set during the early years of the Lebanese Civil War. It is based on the life of Marie Rose Boulos, who was executed by a Christian militia during the conflict. The novel was first published in French in the late 1970s; sources differ on whether the first French publication was in 1977 or 1978, and a Beirut Arabic translation appeared by 1979.

== Background ==
While historically French political influence in Lebanon ended with the French Mandate in 1943 the continued cultural influence of the West helped to create a diversity in the character of Lebanon. Adnan uses the contrasts of the Western and Eastern influences on Beirut to illustrate the major themes of the novel. The role of women within Lebanese society is paid extra attention as the latter half of the novel is a dramatization of the death of Marie Rose Boulos. Marie Rose Boulos was an immigrant from Syria who taught deaf-mute children and helped to organize social services for Palestinian camps.

== Publication history ==
Adnan wrote Sitt Marie Rose in 1977 in French. That same year it was translated and published in Arabic. However, due to the nature of the novel it was marketed in Muslim West Beirut but not Christian East Beirut.

== Plot introduction ==
The novel begins before the civil war with an unnamed female narrator describing her friend Mounir's desire to make a movie based on Syrian immigrants who come to work in Lebanon. After this brief section, the novel turns its attention solely to the death of Sitt Marie Rose as perceived by seven different characters.

== Plot summary ==
The novel is divided into two “Times”: “Time I” and “Time II.”

Time I offers a description of prewar Beirut with Mounir wanting the female narrator of this section to write the script for his film. As Time I progress the violence that is mentioned as happening in Beirut escalates into what becomes the Lebanese Civil War. At the end of Time I the narrator tells Mounir that she cannot write a film for him, given that Mounir repudiates the narrator's suggestions on the grounds that they are too violent and political.

Time II is divided into three sections with seven chapters each. One chapter in each section is devoted to relating the events surrounding the death of Sitt Marie Rose from the perspective of one of the narrators. The narrators always follow the following order in each of the three sections: the deaf-mute school children that Sitt Marie Rose teaches, Sitt Marie Rose herself, Mounir, Tony, Fouad, Friar Bouna Lias, and the unnamed narrator from Time I.

== Characters ==
The deaf-mutes that Sitt Marie Rose teach speak with a singular voice. No individual child is ever attributed as speaking at a given time, rather they speak with a collective voice, like a Greek chorus. The deaf-mutes look up to and respect Sitt Marie Rose greatly, wishing they could be of more help to her.

Sitt Marie Rose is the title character of the novel, throughout which her challenges to the status quo that Mounir, Tony, and Fouad are protecting are repeatedly made. The novel culminates with her death at the hands of her captors. She is initially captured for helping the PLO, as well as living and being romantically involved with a Palestinian doctor who is a PLO official.

Mounir is a childhood friend of Sitt Marie Rose. Having been attracted to her during their childhood he struggles with his desire to perform his duty as a leader of the Chabab militia and with trying to persuade Sitt Marie Rose to abandon her cause and take up his so that the militia may spare her life. Mounir, Tony, Fouad, Bona Lias, and Sitt Marie Rose are all Christians.

Tony and Fouad are friends of Mounir. In Time I a film is shown of the two of them hunting with Mounir. Time II has them acting as militia men underneath Mounir. Fouad is very violent and enjoys killing. He is by far the most cruel character in the book and his mind is always set on death and torture. Tony has no respect for any women in the book and has a very violent disposition similar to Fouad.

Friar Bouna Lias is a clergyman in league with the Chabab. Throughout Time II he tries to get Sitt Marie Rose to confess her sins of helping the Palestinians and abandoning the cause that her countrymen are fighting for.

The unnamed narrator sets up the atmosphere of prewar Beirut in Time I and comments on the events of Sitt Marie Rose's death from a time after her actual death. Unlike the other characters in Time II she speaks in the past tense concerning Sitt Marie Rose rather than in the present tense.

== Major themes ==
Gender is one of the several major themes of Sitt Marie Rose. It is evident in Time I with the indirect speech of the women. With the exception of when the narrator talks with Mounir, women's speech in Time I is related through paraphrasing rather than direct quotation. This paraphrasing has the effect of alienating women by not relating their speech yet including them as the sum of what they say is still related. In hand with this is the portrayal of women as being nothing more than accessories for the “modern” Lebanese man*. It is this modernity that Sitt Marie Rose possesses and which places her in danger. By virtue of being “modern” Sitt Marie Rose challenges the status quo of her surroundings and tries to help the Palestinian cause. Sitt Marie Rose's modernity effectively attracts and alienates Mounir as it is the cause for her transgressions of the expected role of women in Lebanese society.

For Mounir, Tony, and Fouad, the world exists as a series of hierarchies, with the French above the Lebanese who are above Syrians as well as gendered hierarchy of Lebanese society that prejudices the militia's opinion of Marie Rose. By extension, Mounir longs for a Lebanon under the direct influence of Europe while aspiring to hold modern sensibilities (given his behavior towards Sitt Marie Rose). Marie Rose herself blames the influence of the Jesuits as being responsible for the behavior of Lebanese men. This point is illustrated with the portrayal of the Crusades as put on by the French priests, invigorating the young Lebanese men to reject their cultural heritage and yearn for the influence of the West.

Another major theme is the cause of the Lebanese Civil War. Sitt Marie Rose argues that the outbreak of the war is the fault of both the Christians and the Muslims. This is especially evident with the character of Bouna Lias who supports the Chabab as they are “fighting for the road that leads to the divine”. Mounir however claims that he and the Chabab are fighting to reinforce the state in a conflict that will end with a clear victor and a clearly vanquished enemy. The novel undermines Bouna Lias’ position and qualifies Mounir's by suggesting that rather than fight for a higher cause the war is being fought across class lines, as poor immigrants versus established natives.

Confounding all of this is the concept that a single idea can be put forward as speaking for all of the people in Lebanon. The representation of the deaf-mute children as a collective trying to learn to communicate with others who cannot understand them quite clearly contrasts the concept of Mounir's that a single voice can speak for everyone.

== Style ==
The above description of how the novel is split into two Times, one of which is further subdivided shows how, at an organizational level, the novel is an experiment of presentation and how a novel can be presented. Adnan's writings specifically go on to dramatize the contradictions between West and East, West and East Beirut, Muslim and Christian, Lebanese, Syrian, and Palestinian and how each of these sets of variables work together to spur on the civil war.

== Reception ==
Sitt Marie Rose won the Amitié Franco-Arab Prize (an award given by the Association de Solidarité Franco-Arabe) in 1977.
