= The Arab Apocalypse =

1980 book-length poem by Etel Adnan

- Cover of the English-language edition
- Author: Etel Adnan
- Original title: 'L'Apocalypse arabe'
- Translator: Etel Adnan
- Language: French
- Genre: Poetry
- Publisher: Papyrus; Post-Apollo Press (English translation)
- Publication date: 1980
- Publication place: France
- English publication date: 1989
- Media type: Print
- Pages: 59 (French edition)
- ISBN: 2-86541-006-4

The Arab Apocalypse (French: L'Apocalypse arabe) is a book-length poem by Etel Adnan. It was first published in French by Papyrus in Paris in 1980, and Adnan's English translation was published by Post-Apollo Press in 1989. Critics have described the work as a hybrid or visual poem and as a work of witness shaped by the Lebanese Civil War.

== Background and publication ==
Adnan began writing the poem in Beirut in January 1975, shortly before the outbreak of the Lebanese Civil War. The original French edition, L'Apocalypse arabe, was published by Papyrus in 1980. The English version was translated by Adnan herself and published by Post-Apollo Press in 1989. A third English edition was issued in 2007, with a new foreword by Jalal Toufic.

== Reception ==
In Jacket2, Aditi Machado wrote that The Arab Apocalypse could be understood through several framings, including hybrid text, visual poetry, surrealism, translation, and postcolonial writing, while arguing that its central force lies in its character as a work of witness. In Poetry Northwest, Summer Farah noted that the book "is built from repetition. Adnan plays with absence in these repetitions."

Reviewing the English edition in 1989, Kamal Boullata described The Arab Apocalypse as a 59-stanza poem and the concluding sequel to a trilogy of long poems, arguing that it confirmed Adnan as a major figure in contemporary Arab poetry. In a later essay for Al Jadid, Mona Takieddine Amyuni emphasized the poem's visual power and called its "cosmic" vision "the Arabs' Guernica".
