= Evelyne Accad =

Lebanese-born educator and writer living (born 1943)

Evelyne Accad (born October 6, 1943) is a Lebanese-born educator and writer living in the United States, France and Lebanon.

== Life ==
Accad is the daughter of a Swiss mother (Suzanne Steudler) and a father of Lebanese and Egyptian descent (Fouad Accad). She was born in Beirut in 1943 and grew up in Lebanon and came to the United States in the early 1960s. She was educated at the Beirut College for Women, Anderson College, Ball State University and Indiana University Bloomington, receiving a PhD in comparative literature from the latter institution. Accad taught at Beirut University College in 1978 and 1984 and at Northwestern University in 1991. She is Professor Emerita in Francophone, Arabophone, African, Middle East, Women's Studies and Comparative Literature at the University of Illinois at Urbana–Champaign and the Lebanese American University in Beirut.

She published her first novel L'Excisée in 1982; it was translated into English as The Excised in 1989. This novel deals with excision of women in both the physical and metaphorical sense.

Although she has her own unique style, Accad was strongly influenced by the Egyptian-born French writer Andrée Chedid and the Egyptian writer Nawal El Saadawi.

== Selected works ==
=== Fiction ===
- Coquelicot du massacre (1988) ISBN 9782738400895
- Blessures des Mots: Journal de Tunisie (1993) ISBN 9782907883672; English version Wounding Words: A Woman's Journal in Tunisia (1996) ISBN 9782343108094

=== Non-fiction ===
- Veil of shame: the role of women in the contemporary fiction of North Africa and the Arab world (1978) ISBN 978-2890400993; received the International Educator's Award; review
- Sexuality and War: Literary Masks of the Middle East (1990) ISBN 9780814705957; review
- Des femmes, des hommes et la guerre: Fiction et Realite au Proche-Orient (1993) ISBN 9782907883559; received the France-Lebanon Literary Award
- Voyages en cancer (2000); received the Prix Phenix de Literature; English version The Wounded Breast: Intimate Journeys Through Cancer (2001) ISBN 9782738499134
