= Action poétique =

Action poétique was a French poetry journal published from 1950 to 2012. It was founded in Marseille by Jean Malrieu and Gérald Neveu.
