= List of avant-garde films of the 2020s =

This is a list of avant-garde and experimental films released in the 2020s.

Title	Director	Cast	Country	Notes	Ref.
2020
KRABI, 2562	Ben Rivers, Anocha Suwichakornpong		UK		
Look Then Below	Ben Rivers		UK		
Friend of the World	Brian Patrick Butler	Nick Young, Alexandra Slade, Michael C. Burgess, Kathryn Schott, Kevin Smith, Luke Pensabene, Neil Raymond Ricco	US		
A Metamorfose dos Pássaros	Catarina Vasconcelos		Portugal		
Movie That Invites Pausing	Ken Jacobs		US		
Red Moon Tide	Lois Patiño		Spain		
The Whole Shebang	Ken Jacobs		US		
The Eyes of Summer	Rajee Samarasinghe	Shalani Dilasha, Malka Malshani, Lanka Rajapaksa	Sri Lanka / USA		
Purple Sea	Amel Alzakout		Germany		
2021
2020	Friedl vom Grölle		Austria		
An Approximation of their Barbarous Manners	Christian Serritiello		Italy		
Citadel	John Smith		United Kingdom		
Alice, Through the Looking	Adam Donen	Saskia Axten, Vanessa Redgrave, Steven Berkoff, Elijah Rowen, Slavoj Žižek, Carol Cleveland	United Kingdom/Germany		
Devil's Peak	Simon Lu		Hong Kong		
Double Wow	Ken Jacobs		US		
earthearthearth	Daïchi Saïto		Canada/Japan		
Ember Days	Nathaniel Dorsky		US		
Emergence Collapse	Rainer Kohlberger		Austria		
Er is een geest van mij / Hay un fantasma mío	Mateo Vega		Netherlands/Peru		
Fictions	Manuela de Laborde		Mexico		
Flowers blooming in our throats	Eva Giolo		Italy		
Hold Me Tight	Mélanie Robert-Tourneur		Belgium/France		
Inner Outer Space	Laida Lertxundi		Spain		
Just Beyond the Trees	Connor Murphy				
Light Cemetery	Jonah Mills		US		
Light Trap	Pablo Marín		Argentina		
Light Years	Jonah Mills		US		
Mad God	Phil Tippett		US		
Manifestarsi	Gianmarco Donaggio		Italy		
Merapi	Malena Szlam		Chile		
Milano di Carta	Gianmarco Donaggio		Italy		
Parenthesis	Vasilios Papaioannu		Greece/Italy/US		
Petrov's Flu	Kirill Serebrennikov	Ivan Dorn, Chulpan Khamatova	Russia		
Phosphenes	Andre de Nervaux		UK		
Polycephaly in D	Michael Robinson	Trisha Paytas	US		
Quarantine	Diana Ringo	Anatoly Bely, Aleksandr Obmanov	Finland, Russia		
R and J	Carey Williams	David Zayas, María Gabriela de Faría	US		
Rock Bottom Riser	Fern Silva		US		
School Radio to Major Tom	Chisaka Takuya		Japan		
SON CHANT	Vivian Ostrovsky	Chantal Akerman, Sonia Wieder-Atherton	US		
Spencer	Pablo Larrain	Kristen Stewart, Timothy Spall, Jack Farthing	US, UK		
Terce	Nathaniel Dorsky		US		
That Was When I Thought I Could Hear You	Matt Whitman		US		
Time Flows in Strange Ways on Sundays	Giselle Lin	Peter Yu, Wendy Toh, Iris Li	Singapore		
Titane	Julia Ducournau	Vincent Lindon, Agathe Rousselle	France		
Tonalli	Los Ingrávidos		Mexico		
Train Again	Peter Tscherkassky		Austria		
Transparents, I am.	Yuri Muraoka	Yuri Muraoka, Nonoho Suzuki, Hana Suzuki	Japan		
Vortex	Gaspar Noé	Dario Argento, Françoise Lebrun, Alex Lutz	France/Belgium/Morocco		
Water from The Tremulous Stream	Javiera Cisterna		Chile		
What is it that you said?	Shun Ikezoe	Eric Saito	Japan		
When Light is Displaced	Zaina Bseiso	Alaa Bseiso	Palestine		
Worlds	Isaac Goes		Canada/US		
Show me Other Places	Rajee Samarasinghe		Sri Lanka / USA		
2022
Agnès Varda - Pier Paolo Pasolini - New York - 1967	Agnès Varda	Agnès Varda, Pier Paolo Pasolini	France		
THE HOUSE WAS QUIET	Ben Rivers		UK		
Attic Windows of the Infinite	Sapphire Rachael Goss		United Kingdom/Italy		
Azul no Azul	Gianmarco Donaggio		Portugal		
Buster Keaton Embossed	Ken Jacobs		US		
After Work	Ben Rivers, Céline Condorelli		UK		
Counterfeit Poasts	Jon Rafman		Canada		
Crimes of the Future	David Cronenberg	Viggo Mortensen, Kristen Stewart	US		
The Demands of Ordinary Devotion	Eva Giolo		Italy/Belgium		
Epistolary Kisses	Itamar A.C.				
Fairytale	Alexander Sokurov		Russia		
Fata Morgana	Tacita Dean		US		
Festina Lente	Baya Medhaffar		Tunisia/France		
Herbaria	Leandro Listorti		Germany/Argentina		
Interval	Nathaniel Dorsky		US		
Lake Forest Park	Kersti Jan Werdal		US		
Light Oneiric	Maren Pan, Sy Brand		United Kingdom		
Lights, Like Angels, Flying	Joshua Peinado	Rodny Aquino	US		
Morvan	Scott Hammen		US		
A Moth Orchid Flies at Night	Maren Pan, Sy Brand		United Kingdom		
Naos	Nathaniel Dorsky		US		
Pigment-Dispersion Syndrome	Jennifer Reeves		US		
Sea Series 23	John Price		Canada		
Softly, the current may bend our bodies	Maren Pan, Sy Brand		United Kingdom/Italy		
The song nobody knows	Rainer Kohlberger		Austria		
The Sparrow Dream	Robert Beavers	Ute Aurand	Germany/USA		
Tchaikovsky's Wife	Kirill Serebrennikov	Alyona Mikhaylova, Odin Biron	Russia		
The Tomb of Kafka	Jean-Claude Rousseau	Jean-Claude Rousseau	France		
ULTRADREAM	Guillaume Vallée		Canada		
Umbra	Daniela Muñoz Barroso		Cuba		
Welcome	Jean-Claude Rousseau		France		
XCXHXEXRXRXIXEXSX	Ken Jacobs		US		
Xilma-xil	Itamar A.C.				
W	Anna Eriksson	Anna Eriksson, Parco Lee	Finland		
Mangosteen	Tulapop Saenjaroen		Thailand		
Visão do Paraíso	Leonardo Pirondi	David OReilly, Douglas Goodwin, Jackson Fletcher, Dan Dixon	Brazil / USA / UK		
Strangers	Rajee Samarasinghe		Sri Lanka / USA		
Bold Eagle	Whammy Alcazaren		Philippines		
2023
1984	Diana Ringo		Finland, Russia		
Lotus-Eyed Girl	Rajee Samarasinghe		Sri Lanka / United States		
Coral	Sonia Oleniak		USA / Poland		
Dildotectonica	Tomás Paula Marques		Portugal		
and so it came about (A Tale of Consequential Dormancy)	Charlotte Pryce		USA		
Nocturne for a Forest	Catarina Vasconcelos		Portugal		
The Rays of a Storm	Julio Hernández Cordón		Mexico		
Borrowing a Family Album	Tamer El Said		Egypt		
In Visible Light	Gianmarco Donaggio		Norway/Italy	Performative Film	
In Praise of Slowness	Hicham Gardaf	Khalid Mousmi, Abdellah Ben Messaoud, Fatima Benabbou	United Kingdom / Italy		
Myanmar Anatomy	Prapat Jiwarangsan		United Arab Emirates / Thailand	Installation Film	
yours,	Eva Giolo, Rebecca Jane Arthur, Katja Mater, Sirah Foighel Brutmann, Eitan Efrat, Maaike Neuville		Belgium		
Death Mask	John Greyson	Kong Kie Njo, Spencer Britten, Jera Wolfe	Canada		
Giant's Kettle	Markku Hakala, Mari Käki		Finland		
Ijen, London	Ben Rivers		UK		
When We Encounter The World	Leonardo Pirondi & Zazie Ray-Trapido		Portugal / USA		
Shrooms	Jorge Jácome		Portugal		
Last Things	Deborah Stratman	Valérie Massadian, Marcia Bjørnerud	France / USA / Portugal		
Laika	Deborah Stratman		USA		
The Wool Aliens	Julia Parks		UK		
Holographic Will	Mike Stoltz		USA		
Light, Noise, Smoke, and Light, Noise, Smoke	Nishikawa Tomonari		Japan		
Dau:añcut (Moving Along Image)	Adam Piron		Kiowa Tribe of Oklahoma		
Nearest Neighbor	Rebecca Baron, Douglas Goodwin		USA		
The Zone of Interest	Jonathan Glazer	Christian Friedel, Sandra Hüller	UK		
Sermon to the Birds	Hilal Baydarov	Huseyn Nasirov, Rana Asgarova, Orkhan Iskandarli	Azerbaijan		
2024
Animalia Paradoxa	Niles Atallah	Andrea Gómez	Chile		
Potenciais à Deriva	Leonardo Pirondi		Brazil / USA		
Pepe	Nelson Carlo De Los Santos Arias	Jhon Narváez, Sor María Ríos, Fareed Matjila, Harmony Ahalwa, Jorge Puntillón García	Dominican Republic / Namibia / Germany / France		
Direct Action	Guillaume Cailleau, Ben Russell		Germany / France		
Materia vibrante	Pablo Marín		Argentina		
Barrunto	Emilia Beatriz	Shanti Lalita, Harry Josephine Giles, Alicia Matthews, Ángela Ginorio	United Kingdom / Puerto Rico		
Nanacatepec	Elena Pardo, Azucena Losana		Mexico / Spain	Performative Film	
Remote Occlusions	Utkarsh		India / USA		
Quebrante	Janaina Wagner		Brazil		
Sarcophagus of Drunken Loves	Joana Hadjithomas & Khalil Joreige		France / Lebanon		
I Would Rather Be a Stone	Ana Hušman		Croatia		
O Seeker	Gavati Wad | with Varun Sahni		USA / India		
Um tropeço em cinco movimentos	Valentina Rosset		Brazil		
Eno	Gary Hustwit		UK / USA		
Being (the Digital Griot)	Rashaad Newsome		USA	AI - Film	
Detours while speaking of monsters	Deniz Şimşek		Germany / Turkey		
Grandmamauntsistercat	Zuza Banasińska		Netherlands / Poland		
The Instability of Clouds	Zazie Ray-Trapido		USA		
Terminal Island	Sam Drake		USA		
History Is Written at Night	Alejandro Alonso Estrella	Teresita Estrella Careaga	Cuba / France		
Crazy Lotus	Naween Noppakun	Surat Kaewseekram, Phemsinee Sawangkla, Gorrawiya Aphipobthitikorn, Thongchai Pimapunsri	Thailand		
Digital Devil Saga	Cameron Worden		USA		
Break no.1 & Break no.2.	Lei Lei		China		
My Want of You Partakes of Me	Beny Wagner & Sasha Litvintseva		UK/Netherlands		
Single File	Simon Liu		Italy/USA/UK/Hong Kong		
Invisible People	Alisa Berger		France / Germany		
Appearances	Nicolás Onischuk		Argentina		
Revolving Rounds	Johann Lurf & Christina Jauernik		Austria	35mm 3D	
www.RachelOrmont.com	Peter Vack		US		
2025
. . . . Rumene zore	Davorin Marc		Slovenia		
After Dreaming	Christine Haroutounian	Davit Beybutyan, Veronika Poghosyan	Armenia/USA/Mexico		
Dandelion	Steven Subotnick		USA		
Extra Life (and Decay)	Stéphanie Lagarde	Isabelle Lagarde, Stéphanie Lagarde, Suzanne van der Schaaf, Rachele Borghi, Teresa Castro	France		
A Monster with Its Mouth Agape	Steven McInerney		UK		
A Patriot of These Woods	Karel Doing		UK		
2026
Born of the Yam	Mark Chua & Lam Li Shuen		Singapore	Performative Film	
Katabasis	Martin Moolhuijsen		Germany / Italy		
Phi Pattana	Komtouch Napattaloong		Thailand		
Yurugu – Invisible Lines	Petna Ndaliko Katondolo, Laurent Van Lancker		Democratic Republic of the Congo / Belgium		
Butterfly Stories: Malaise II	Laurence Favre		Switzerland, Germany	Installation	
Forever…Forever	Johann Lurf			70mm	
