= 53rd International Film Festival Rotterdam =

2024 edition of IFFR

- Logo
- Opening film: Head South by Jonathan Ogilvie
- Closing film: La Luna by M. Raihan Halim
- Location: Rotterdam, Netherlands
- Founded: 1972
- Awards: Tiger Award: Rei by Tanaka Toshihiko; Audience Award: Green Border by Agnieszka Holland; Robby Müller Award: Grimm Vandekerckhove
- No. of films: 400
- Festival date: Opening: 25 January 2024; Closing: 4 February 2024
- Website: IFFR

International Film Festival Rotterdam
- 2025 2023

The 53rd International Film Festival Rotterdam, is the 2024 edition of the International Film Festival Rotterdam, which began on 25 January 2024.

== Description ==
The complete line-up of films competing in the festival was revealed on 18 December 2023.

The festival opened with Head South, a New Zealand film by Jonathan Ogilvie, on 25 January 2024, and closed on 4 February 2024 with La Luna by M. Raihan Halim.

The Arab Cinema Center, on its 10th anniversary, supported three producers in the Rotterdam Lab, and ran five days of panel sessions and events at the festival.

Rei by Tanaka Toshihiko of Japan won the Tiger Award, while Kiss Wagon by Midhun Murali from India and Flathead by Jaydon Martin from Australia won the Special Jury Awards. The VPRO Big Screen Award was awarded to The Old Bachelor by Oktay Baraheni from Iran. Green Border by Agnieszka Holland won the Audience Award.

== Juries ==
=== Tiger Competition ===
- Marco Müller: former director of Locarno, Venice and IFFR
- Ena Sendijarević: an Amsterdam-based Bosnian filmmaker and screenwriter
- Nadia Turincev: industry expert and founder of Easy Rider Films
- Herman Yau: Hong Kong film director, screenwriter and cinematographer.
- Billy Woodberry: leading directors of the L.A. Rebellion

=== Tiger Short Competition ===
- Mónica Lima: Portuguese filmmaker
- Yasmina Price: New York-based writer and film programmer
- Jade Wiseman: a Montreal-born film distributor now based in Amsterdam.

=== Big Screen Competition ===
- Samina Khan
- Sylvie de Leeuwe
- Lisa van der Loos
- Marcos Silva
- Ella de Bruijn

=== FIPRESCI Award ===
- Ela Bittencourt
- Dārta Ceriņa
- Panagiotis Kotzathanasis
- Antonios Lagarias
- Ronald Rovers

=== NETPAC Award ===
- Elena Larionova Haug
- Donsaron Kovitvanitcha
- Andreas Ungerböck

== Official selection ==
=== Opening and closing films ===
English title	Original title	Director(s)	Production countrie(s)
Opening film
Head South		Jonathan Ogilvie	New Zealand
Closing film
La Luna		M. Raihan Halim	Singapore, Malaysia

=== Tiger Competition ===
The following films are selected to compete for the Tiger Award. The line-up was announced on 19 December 2023.

Highlighted title indicates award winner.

English title	Original title	Director(s)	Production countrie(s)
The Ballad of Suzanne Césaire		Madeleine Hunt-Ehrlich	United States
Flathead		Jaydon Martin	Australia
Grey Bees		Dmytro Moiseiev	Ukraine
Kiss Wagon		Midhun Murali	India
Me, Maryam, the Children and 26 Others		Farshad Hashemi	Iran, Germany, Czech Republic
Moses		Jenni Luhta, Lauri Luhta	Finland
The Rim	La parra	Alberto Gracia	Spain
Formosa Beach	Praia Formosa	Julia De Simone	Brazil, Portugal
Rei		Tanaka Toshihiko	Japan
Journey of Shadows	Reise der Schatten	Yves Netzhammer	Switzerland
She Fell to Earth		Susie Au	Hong Kong
sr		Lea Hartlaub	Germany
Swimming Home		Justin Anderson	United Kingdom
Under a Blue Sun		Daniel Mann	France, Israel

=== Big Screen Competition ===
The following films are selected to compete for the VPRO Big Screen Award.

Highlighted title indicates award winner

English title	Original title	Director(s)	Production countrie(s)
Aire: Just Breathe		Leticia Tonos	Dominican Republic, Spain
Children of War and Peace		Ville Suhonen	Finland
Trust	Confidenza	Daniele Luchetti	Italy
Eternal		Ulaa Salim	Denmark, Iceland, Norway
Milk Teeth		Sophia Bösch	Germany, Switzerland
The Old Bachelor		Oktay Baraheni	Iran
Portrait of a Certain Orient		Marcelo Gomes	Brazil, Italy, Lebanon
Seven Seas Seven Hills	Yezhu Kadal Yezhu Malai	Ram	India
Steppenwolf		Adilkhan Yerzhanov	Kazakhstan
Tenement		Inrasothythep Neth, Sokyou Chea	Cambodia
The Worst Man in London		Rodrigo Areias	Portugal
Yohanna		Robby Ertanto	Indonesia, United Kingdom, Italy

=== Tiger Short Competition ===
The following films were selected to compete for the Tiger Short Competition.

Highlighted title indicates award winner

English title	Original title	Director(s)	Production countrie(s)
3 MWh		Marie-Magdalena Kochová	Czech Republic
6000 mensonges		Simon Rieth	France
Break no.1 & Break no.2.		Lei Lei	China
Crazy Lotus		Naween Noppakun	Thailand
Daphne was a torso ending in leaves		Catriona Gallagher	Italy, Greece
Digital Devil Saga		Cameron Worden	USA
Two Sides of the Tortoise	Los dos lados de la tortuga	Oscar Illingworth	Ecuador
Few Can See		Frank Sweeney	Ireland
Flatastic		Alice Saey	France, Netherlands
Flower Show		Elli Vuorinen	Finland
History Is Written at Night	La historia se escribe de noche	Alejandro Alonso Estrella	Cuba, France
I Would Rather Be a Stone	Radije bih bila kamen	Ana Hušman	Croatia
Like a Sick Yellow	Si e verdhë e sëmurë	Norika Sefa	Kosovo
Petticoat Fire		Mox Mäkelä	Finland
Adrift Potentials	Potenciais à Deriva	Leonardo Pirondi	Brazil, USA
Teen Girl Fantasy		Marisa Hoicka	Canada
Terminal Island		Sam Drake	USA
To Exist Under Permanent Suspicion		Valentin Noujaïm	France
Void		Iwasaki Yusuke	Japan
The Watchman	Nöbetçi	Ali Cherri	Italy France
Workers' Wings	Krahët e punëtoreve	Ilir Hasanaj	Kosovo

=== Short & Mid-length ===
The Short & Mid-length film programme showcases films under 63 minutes.

Original title	Director(s)	Production countrie(s)
1014	Deborah S. Philips	Germany
102 Narra	Rafael Manueal, Tatjana Fanny	Netherlands
Ade (On a Sunday)	Theja Rio	India
Alguén me chamou Serpe Negra	Borja Santomé Rodríguez	Spain
Azul Pandora	Alan González	Cuba
Baulera 12	Mila Araoz, Amaru Villanueva Rance	UK
Beautiful Men	Nicolas Kepens	Belgium
Bonnarien	Adiel Gliot	French Guiana
A Brave New World	Arnold Tam	Hong Kong
Bull's Heart	Margarita Bagdasaryan	Uzbekistan
Coral	Sonia Oleniak	USA
Dau:añcut (Moving Along Image)	Adam Piron	Kiowa Tribe of Oklahoma
Dear Shadow, My Old Friend	Timoteus Anggawan Kusno	Netherlands
Denials, Decoys	Micah Weber	USA
Descent	Syd Farrington	UK
Dig It	Gabriel Lester	Netherlands
East Coker	Wang Hanxuan	China
The Electric Kiss	Rainer Kohlberger	Austria
O filme feliz :)	Duarte Coimbra	Portugal
Flux	Youjin Moon	USA
Golden Dragon	Boren Chhith	Cambodia
Grandmamauntsistercat	Zuza Banasińska	Netherlands
Holographic Will	Mike Stoltz	USA
I Am Hymns of the New Temples	Wael Shawky	Italy
I Would've Been Happy	Jordan Wong	USA
I. / II. / III.	Alexandre Larose	Canada
If I'm Here It Is by Mystery	Clari Ribeiro	Brazil
In Dreams	Josh Shaffner	USA
The Inescapable Desire of Roots	Mark Chua, Lam Li Shuen	Singapore
The Instability of Clouds	Zazie Ray-Trapido	USA
Is my Living in Vain	Ufuima Essi	UK
Isblink	Olga Krüssenberg	Sweden
Keep Looking	Ayo Akingbade	USA
Leela	Tanmay Chowdhary	India
lessons in flight	Cecilia Araneda	Brazil
Light, Noise, Smoke, and Light, Noise, Smoke	Nishikawa Tomonari	Japan
Line of Sight	Ali Eslami	Netherlands
Loophole	Jordan Strafer	USA
Lose Voice Tool Kit	Adele Dipasquale	Italy
Magic & Propaganda	Lilia Filina	Russia
Manántula	Ion de Sosa	Spain
A Man Imagined	Malanie Shatzky, Brian M. Cassidy	Canada
Man of Aral	Helena Gouveia Monteiro	Ireland
Materia vibrante	Pablo Marín	Argentina
Molecular Delusions	Quentin L'helgoualc'h	France
Msaytbeh, the elevated place.	Rawane Nassif	Lebanon
El neceser rojo	Serge Garcia	Mexico
Ojitos mentirosos	Elena Duque	Spain
On Plains of Larger River & Woodlands	Miguel de Jesus	Portugal
Pain	Ivan Faktor	Croatia
Peeper	Han Changlok	South Korea
Pistoleras	Natalia del Mar Kašik	Austria
Preoperational Model	Philip Ullman	Netherlands
Questioning the Existence of Alec	Roger Horn	South Africa
A Radical Duet	Onyeka Igwe	UK
Schalafsand	Elias Böttcher	Switzerland
The Silence of Iron	Mariana de Melo	Brazil
Silent Panorama	Nicolas Piret	Belgium
Sleepy Heads	Tudor Cristian Jurgiu	Romania
space_invaders.exe	Malaz Usta	Netherlands
Spirits of the Black Leaves	Thaweechok Phasom	Thailand
Stero	Tevin Kimathi, Millan Tarus	Kenya
Storyboard Suli	Anggun Priambodo	Indonesia
El tercer mundo después del sol	Analú Laferal, Tiagx Vélez	Colombia
To the spirits in the room	Cate Giordano	USA
Um tropeço em cinco movimentos	Valentina Rosset	Brazil
UNDR	Kamal Aljafari	Palestine
Water Hazard	Alexander David	Portugal
When the Wind Rises	Chen Hung	Taiwan
The Witness Tree	Niranjan Raj Bherwal	Nepal
The Wool Aliens	Julia Parks	UK
You can't get what you want but you can get me	Samira Elagoz, Z Walsh	Netherlands
Zanatany, L'empreinte des linceuls esseulés	Hachimiya Ahamada	Belgium

=== Bright Future ===
The programme will highlight first-feature films from promising filmmakers.

English title	Original title	Director(s)	Production Countries (s)
78 Days	78 dana	Emilija Gašić	Serbia
Naangal		Avinash Prakash	India
a Few Mornings, an Evening		Astrid van Nimwegen	Netherlands
The Heirloom		Ben Petrie	Canada
Schirkoa: In Lies We Trust		Ishan Shukla	India
yours,		Eva Giolo, Rebecca Jane Arthur, Katja Mater, Sirah Foighel Brutmann, Eitan Efrat, Maaike Neuville	Belgium

=== Cinema Regained ===
English title	Original title	Director(s)	Year	Production countrie(s)
121280 Ritual		Antoinetta Angelidi	2008	Greece
Cinema Bruciato		Clemens Klopfenstein	2024	Switzerland
Godsterminal		Georg Tiller	2024	Austria
Hair Piece: A Film for Nappyheaded People		Ayoka Chenzira	1984	United States
Joymoti Never Left		Mehdi Jahan	2024	India
Naked Acts		Bridgett M. Davis	1995	United States
Obsessive Hours at the Topos of Reality		Rea Wallden	2023	Greece
Overnight Flies		Georg Tiller	2016	Austria
Parama		Aparna Sen	1985	India
Parama: A Journey with Aparna Sen		Suman Ghosh	2024	India
Persona Beach		Georg Tiller	2011	Austria

=== Harbour ===
The programme will showcase contemporary cinema.

English title	Original title	Director(s)	Production countrie(s)
8 Views of Lake Biwa	Biwa järve 8 nägu	Marko Raat	Estonia
100 Yards	门前宝地	Xu Haofeng, Xu Junfeng	China
Animalia Paradoxa		Niles Atallah	Chile
Anubhuti	अनुभूति	Anirban Dutta	India
Cosmic Miniatures		Alexander Kluge	Germany
Dream Team		Lev Kalman, Whitney Horn	New Zealand
Elegies	詩	Ann Hui	Hong Kong
Fire on Water		Sun-J Perumal	Malaysia
Greice		Leonardo Mouramateus	Brazil
Head South		Jonathan Ogilvie	United States
A History of Love and War	Una historia de amor y guerra	Santiago Mohar Volkow	Mexico
Hungry Ghost Diner		We Jun Cho	Malaysia
Power Alley	Levante	Lillah Halla	Brazil
'Lolo & Sosaku' The Western Archive		Sergio Caballero	Spain
Maia – Portrait With Hands		Alexandra Gulea	Germany
Mário		Billy Woodberry	Portugal
Small Hours Of The Night		Daniel Hui	Singapore
So Unreal		Amanda Kramer	United States
The Cursed Land		Panu Aree	Thailand
Trolley Times		Gurvinder Singh	India
Who’ll Stop the Rain	青春並不溫柔	Su I-hsuan	Taiwan
Heresy	Witte Wieven	Didier Konings	Netherlands
Zone		Christina Friedrich	Germany
God Between Us	Zwischen uns Gott	Rebecca Hirneise	Austria

=== Art Directions: immersive media ===
The programme highlighted the expansion of cinema to installations, exhibitions and live performance.

English title	Original title	Director(s)	Production countrie(s)
8 miljard ikken		Tibor de Jong	Netherlands
The Assembly		Charlotte Bruneau	Luxembourg
I'm Terribly Sorry		Rachel Maclean	United Kingdom
Realmbreak Hotel		Floris van Laethem	Netherlands
Small Acts of Violence		Aay Liparoto	Belgium

=== Limelight ===
The programme will showcase cinematic highlights of film festival favourites and international award-winners.

English title	Original title	Director(s)	Production countrie(s)
13 Bombs	13 Bom di Jakarta	Angga Dwimas Sasongko	Indonesia
Adagio		Stefano Sollima	Italy
The Beast	La Bête	Bertrand Bonello	France
Blue Giant		Yuzuru Tachikawa	Italy
Boléro		Anne Fontaine	France
La chimera		Alice Rohrwacher	Italy
Daaaaaalí!		Quentin Dupieux	France
The Delinquents	Los delincuentes	Rodrigo Moreno	Argentina
Evil Does Not Exist	悪は存在しない	Ryusuke Hamaguchi	Japan
Firebrand		Karim Aïnouz	United Kingdom
Four Daughters		Kaouther Ben Hania	France
Full River Red	滿江紅	Zhang Yimou	China
Green Border	Zielona granica	Agnieszka Holland	Poland
Hammarskjöld		Per Fly	Sweden
Holly		Fien Troch	Belgium
How to Have Sex		Molly Manning Walker	United Kingdom
The Iron Claw		Sean Durkin	United States
Jigarthanda DoubleX	ஜிகர்தண்டா டபுள்X	Karthik Subbaraj	India
The Arctic Convoy	Konvoi	Henrik Martin Dahlsbakken	Norway
Krazy House		Steffen Haars, Flip van der Kuil	Netherlands
Lost in the Night		Amat Escalante	Mexico
La Luna		M. Raihan Halim	Singapore
Madame Luna		Daniel Espinosa	Sweden
Mars Express		Jérémie Périn	France
The Promised Land	Bastarden	Nikolaj Arcel	Denmark
Stormskerry Maja	Stormskärs-Maja	Tiina Lymi	Finland
Viduthalai Part 1 and Viduthalai Part 2	விடுதலை: பாகம் I & II	Vetrimaaran	India
Voy! Voy! Voy!	!فوي! فوي! فوي	Omar Hilal	Egypt
The Zone of Interest		Jonathan Glazer	United States

=== Kids & Family ===
English title	Original title	Director(s)	Production countrie(s)
Andersland		An Vrombaut	
Blèh		Tim Alards, Pepijn van Essen	

== Awards ==
Winner(s)	Work/ director	Notes	Ref.
Robby Müller Award
Grimm Vandekerckhove Cinematographer (Belgium)		Honoured	

=== Tiger Award ===
- Rei, Tanaka Toshihiko, Japan

Special Jury Awards

- Kiss Wagon, Midhun Murali, India
- Flathead Jaydon Martin, Australia

=== VPRO Big Screen award ===
- The Old Bachelor, Oktay Baraheni, Iran

=== FIPRESCI Award ===
- Kiss Wagon, Midhun Murali, India

=== NETPAC Award ===
- Schirkoa: In Lies We Trust Ishan Shukla, India, France, Germany

=== Youth Jury Award ===
- Power Alley (Levante), Lillah Halla, Brazil, France, Uruguay

=== Audience Award ===
- Green Border by Agnieszka Holland

=== Ammodo Tiger short awards ===
- Crazy Lotus, Naween Noppakun, Thailand
- Few Can See, Frank Sweeney, Ireland
- Workers’ Wings, Ilir Hasanaj, Kosovo

=== European Short Film Award nomination ===
- I Would Rather Be a Stone, Ana Hušman, Croatia

=== KNF Award 2024 ===
- Daphne was a torso ending in leaves, Catriona Gallagher, Italy, Greece
