= Decolonization in Latino culture =

Decolonization in Latino culture refers to contemporary treatment of and work with past colonialist and imperialist influences on Latin American society in the US.

== History ==
Decolonization is a term that refers to a period in history, but it has evolved to become a theme in many studies revolving around Latino literature, studies and arts. It arose as a response to the rule of many states by a bigger, usually more powerful, nation. It “was interpreted to be both a calculated process of military engagement and diplomatic negotiation between the two contending parties: colonial and anti-colonial”. It first became prominent after World War I, being that Europe lost manpower, finances, and confidence and, at the same time, anti-colonial resentment grew through European colonies especially in literature and in an increase of strikes. Decolonization usually involved the removal of European influence which led to greater implications for the newly freed states. These implications involved gaining independent economic control, amongst other things. The aftermath of decolonization left these states to rebuild themselves and, in many cases, end up mimicking the Western world which they rid themselves of in the first place.

== Modern decolonization ==
Decolonization is now seen as more than ridding European influences. The modern definition involves “obtaining constitutional independence”. This definition, however, has been critiqued to disregard the “economic, social and cultural implications” of the process. In an attempt to incorporate this aspect, the definition has been repurposed to be the “reversal of the process of European imperial expansion with all it political, economic, social, cultural and linguistic consequences”. This, however, is also critiqued because it is difficult to reverse history and the “remnant of its colonial past”. So, decolonization as a theory arose. Decolonization, as a theory, involves assessing history in order to benefit the advancement of society on an international level, during the process of world-making. It involves better assessing the failures and limitations of decolonization in history and anti-imperial efforts to benefit remaking the international order. It also involves detaching from “the overall structure of knowledges in order to engage in epistemic reconstruction”.

=== Critique of decolonization ===
The increased popularity and usage of decolonization has also caused critiques. These critiques, mainly emphasizing that “decolonization is not a metaphor” argue that decolonization has been more popularly used to characterize things that must be fixed or improved in society which gives the term a metaphorical implication. This is said to be dangerous because some of the objectives it is being applied to may not always be in alignment with decolonization’s true definition. Metaphorizing decolonization is critiqued to be a result of “attempt[ing] to reconcile settler guilt and complicity, and rescue settler futurity”.

== Decolonization of Latino studies ==
Decolonizing Latino archives involves undertaking a “decolonial reading of colonial test with Latino literary history”. Scholars, such as Yolanda Martinez San Miguel, theorize that in order to decolonialize the colonial dimensions that appear in United States Latino archives, colonial tests must be read with a decolonial perspective. This would consequently open up Latino studies to its blind spots that are embedded in its teachings. These blind spots, which results from colonization, include lack of collaboration, erasure of some countries and the invisibility of some cultures, such as, indigenous or Asian peoples. Decolonizing how Latino archives are read, also brings in the different engagement with Americanness and the incorporation of experiences of displacement. Decolonization as a theme is thought to have the power to diversify the Latino archives that play a role in Latino studies and diversify the definition of latinidad by dismantling blind spots.

== Decolonization as a theme in Latino arts ==
Decolonization has been incorporated into films, books, music and many other forms of art by Latino artists in order to dismantle the influence that historical colonial efforts has on said art-types. This is popularly seen in the characters and plots that work to critique or comment on society or simply offer stories that break out of the colonial norm known in the field.

=== Books and writers ===
These books are written by Latino writers that challenge the norms of society and therefore give a decolonized perspective in their stories.

- The Poet X by Elizabeth Acevedo
- United States of Banana by Giannina Braschi
- Fever Dream by Samanta Schweblin
- At Night We Walk in Circles by Daniel Alarcón
- Her Body and Other Parties by Carmen Maria Machado
- In the Distance by Hernan Diaz
- The Sound of Things Falling by Juan Gabriel Vásquez
- The Brief Wondrous Life of Oscar Wao by Junot Díaz
- I Am Not Your Perfect Mexican Daughter by Erika Sánchez
- Juliet Takes a Breath by Gabby Rivera
- Before We Were Free by Julia Alvarez
- Ambassador by William Alexander
- Nomad by William Alexander
- Borderlands/La Frontera: The New Mestiza by Gloria E. Anzaldúa
- Lunar Braceros: 2125-2148 by Beatrice Pita and Rosaura Sánchez
- Latin@ Rising An Anthology of Latin@Science Fiction and Fantasy by Frederick Luis Aldama
- The Education of Margot Sanchez by Lilliam Rivera

=== Film ===
Many films have offered a decolonial perspective on Latin American science fiction media. These films usually involve showcasing utopian and dystopian tales and incorporate Latin American identities and ideas. Cinema Tropical and the Museum of the Moving Image offered some examples of these films in their film program for “Uchronias and Dystopian Futures: Latin American Science Fiction Cinema of the 21st Century.”

The films included were:

- César Caro’s Third World (Tercer mundo)
- Sergio Arau's A Day Without a Mexican
- Daniel Molero’s Videofilia (y otros síndromes virales)
- The Project of the Century (La obra del siglo) by Carlos Machado
- Adirley Queirós’s White Out, Black In (Braco sai, preto fica)
- Oscar Campo’s I’m Another (Yo soy otro)
- Marcos Machado Loria’s UFOs in Zacapa (Ovnis en Zacapa)
- Amat Escalante’s The Untamed (La region salvaje)
