= Cinerama (disambiguation) =

Cinerama refers to a film projection process.

Cinerama may also refer to:

- Cinerama (band), UK rock band
- Cinerama (Rotterdam), cinema in Rotterdam
- Seattle Cinerama, cinema in Seattle
- Cinerama, a critic website that covers film, theatre, and television

== See also ==
- Cinéorama, an early film experiment and amusement ride presented for the first time at the 1900 Paris Exposition
