= Head South =

New Zealand comedy drama film

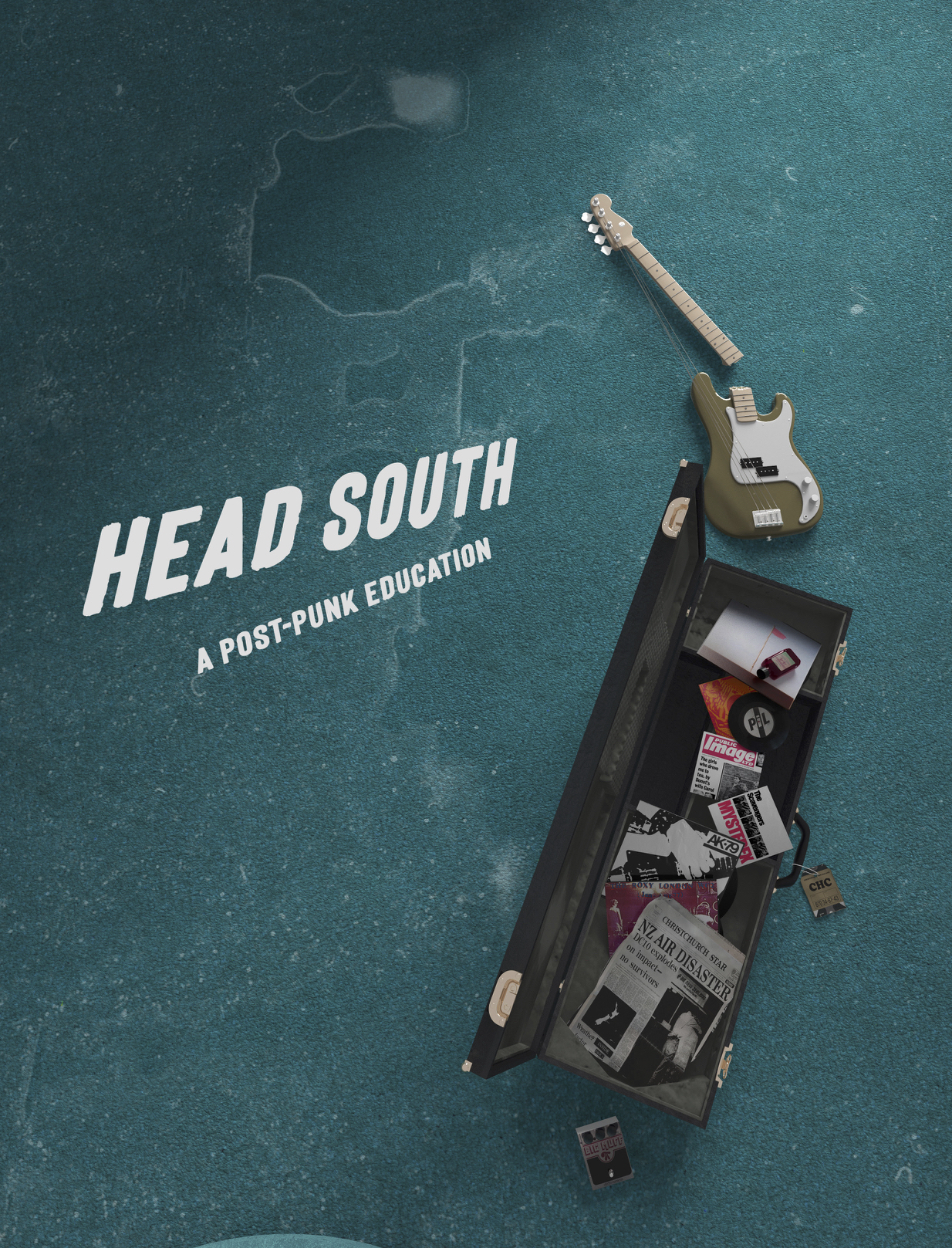
- Directed by: Jonathan Ogilvie
- Written by: Jonathan Ogilvie
- Produced by: Mat Govoni; Antje Kulpe
- Starring: Ed Oxenbould; Márton Csókás; Benee; Roxie Mohebbi
- Cinematography: John Chrisstoffels
- Edited by: Julie-Anne de Ruvo
- Music by: Shayne Carter
- Production company: Black Frame
- Distributed by: Label Distribution
- Release dates: 25 January 2024 (IFFR); 31 October 2024 (New Zealand)
- Running time: 98 minutes
- Country: New Zealand
- Language: English
- Budget: $3.8 million

Head South is a 2024 New Zealand coming-of-age comedy-drama film written and directed by Jonathan Ogilvie. The plot follows a teenager Angus in late 1970s New Zealand with a dream of becoming a musician with his band, "The Daleks". Head South was screened at the International Film Festival Rotterdam in 25 January 2024 and released in New Zealand on 31 October 2024 to positive reviews. The movie was presented by the New Zealand Film Commission in association with HEAD SOUTH COHORT AND BLACK FRAME.

The idea for Head South was born from writer and director Jonathan Ogilvie’s own lived experience growing up in Christchurch in the 1970s and early 80s. The exciting new music, art and fashion of punk, specifically post-punk, had an irresistible pull for Ogilvie in what was otherwise a very conservative environment.

Head South thrives on a comically dark tone that a New Zealand audience recognise. It is also a tone that attempted to appeal to international audiences - a distinctive and engaging take on the coming-of-age film. It is a story of teen reinvention and as such has perennial audience appeal and relevance.

== Plot ==
Christchurch 1979. A minor bicycle accident brings schoolboys, Angus and Jamie face-to-face with a daring young woman, Holly. Outside Middle Earth Records, too intimidated to enter the shop, the two boys are ridiculed by Malcolm, the lead singer of “original band” The Cursed. Despite this, Angus is impressed by the magnetism of Malcolm. Jamie buys a matchbox full of marijuana (in actuality, parsley) from Angus for two dollars. At home Angus’ father, Gordon (a civil engineer) is watching the news of the Antarctic Erebus air crash - a flight that he and Angus’ mum might have been on. Angus discovers his mother has moved out for a fortnight. Over an awkward dinner, Gordon remarks to Angus about the pitfalls of confusing the magnetic with the true. At school his parsley-as-marijuana scam is exposed bystander schoolfriend Stuart. Humiliated by the ruse Jamie demands his money back and punches Angus. The morning mail brings a birthday present from brother Rory in London. It is a 7” vinyl record by seminal post-punk band Public Image Ltd (PIL) – but it is warped and unplayable. Angus plucks up the courage to enter Middle Earth to replace it. Fraser, the manager, is surprisingly friendly. He plays PIL. Loud. The world expands for Angus. Angus gets his haircut short to look like Malcolm and turns his school flares into stovepipes. Angus lies to Malcolm about being in a band and to Holly that his winklepickers, in fact Gordon’s wedding shoes, are from Kings Road London. Fraser, Malcolm and Holly take an interest in him. Angus discovers that Kirsten, the sales assistant at the chemist, is a guitarist. Angus’ strained relationship with Gordon is distracted by his great aunt’s belief in the afterlife and clairvoyance. It was she who warned Angus’ mum not to fly to Antarctica. Gordon buys himself a Flymo lawnmower that Angus, unbeknownst to Gordon, accidentally breaks. Angus sneaks out of home to watch The Cursed on a Sunday night, a school night. He poses for nude photographs taken by Holly’s “boyfriend” in exchange for borrowing a bass guitar. But his growing self-confidence is destroyed when Malcolm rightly accuses him of lying about being in a band. Riding home from Middle Earth, he spies his mother in a sportscar with an unknown, suave man. At home Gordon has set fire to the Flymo that he can’t get to start. Angus decides to start a real band with Kirsten called Daleks. Kirsten’s mum’s “Zachary” electric keyboard supplies the drumbeats. Kirsten is an accomplished musician and artist but lacks the confidence to put this on display. Their musical progress is fast-tracked when Malcolm coerces Angus to play a support slot for The Cursed. Angus’ anxiety is salved when Kirsten reveals that The Cursed are secretly a covers band. In order to sneak Zachary out of the family home, Angus relinquishes Gordon’s wedding shoes to Kirsten’s younger brother On the Friday that Gordon reunites with Angus’ mum for a road trip down south, in his brand new sportscar, Angus & Kirsten perform for the first time on stage. Angus experiences crippling stage-fright. A glimpse of his parents in the audience and encouragement from Jamie gives him the confidence to play. Until Zachary explodes onstage. Malcolm whips up the audience to ridicule Angus. Jamie saves the night by playing the drums. But his unauthorised use of the drum kit causes an onstage ruckus that results in Malcolm and The Cursed being exposed as frauds and Daleks triumphant. Angus, Kirsten, Jamie and Stuart celebrate by drinking Gordon’s whisky at home. Kirsten finally backs herself as an artist but is upset when Angus goes off with Holly. At a railway crossing Angus and Holly are accosted by Holly’s pimp, the Permanent Man. Angus stands up for Holly. Later, in her bedroom, Angus is on the verge of injecting speed when Holly insults Kirsten. He expresses his loyalty by leaving. Crossing the railway track, he passes a train engineer who looks and speaks like Gordon. Strange. At home there is a loud knock at the door. It is a policeman. He brings bad news. Angus is nervously phoning Rory in London when Kirsten, hurt and angry, returns to the house with Gordon’s wedding shoes. Angus chases after her and admits the shoes are not from King’s Road London. He announces to her that Gordon and his mum have been killed in a car crash. Kirsten gives him a hug.

== Cast ==
- Ed Oxenbould as Angus
- Márton Csókás as Gordon
- Benee as Kirsten
- Roxie Mohebbi as Holly
- Jackson Bliss as Fraser
- Demos Murphy as Malcolm
- Oscar Phillips as Stuart
- Toby Cammock-Elliot as Piper
- Janice Gray as Aunt Jessica
- Trendall Pulini as Jamie

== Casting ==
Ogilvie was delighted with the opportunity to work with Márton Csókás in the role of Gordon, being a long-time admirer of his work. Ogilvie was keen to cast a musician in the role of Kirsten as she is the single character in the film with clear musical ability and the drive to forge a future career in music. Benee was Ogilvie’s obvious choice and he was delighted that she responded so positively to the screenplay. The film’s lead Ed Oxenbould joined the project early on. Ogilvie pitched the role of Angus to Australian Oxenbould on Bondi Beach, inspiring him to switch from playing the drums to bass, acquiring a musical expertise far beyond what was required for Angus by the time the film had been greenlit.

Casting agent Jane Mahoney put forward Roxie Mohebbi as Holly. Ogilvie recounts watching her recorded audition and realising this was an inspired suggestion. He says, “After our first meeting I was convinced that Roxie would be perfect in the role. Guess what. She is.”Ogilvie was pleased to bring producer Antje Kulpe to the project. The pair had worked together previously on Ogilvie’s most recent feature film, Lone Wolf. Kulpe says, “I was immediately drawn to the world of Head South as it resonated with my own similar experiences growing up in Christchurch in the 1990s: warehouse parties, working at the university radio station RDU, and going to see bands with cult followings playing at dingy venues. I understood the intergenerational appeal of Head South and also recognised its ability to speak to a wide audience through its authentic immersion in local culture.”

== Production ==
The film is written and directed by Jonathan Oglivie and produced by Mat Govoni and Antje Kulpe. Cinematography was by John Chrisstoffels and production design by Christopher Bruce, with editing by Julie-Anne De Ruvo and contains original music from Shayne Carter.

One challenge that production faced was to recreate Christchurch pre the earthquakes of 2010 and 2011. However their first recce reassured Ogilvie that despite the massive destruction and subsequent re-build, they would be able to find locations, houses and buildings that would bring 1979 back to life. It was crucial for Ogilvie that the film’s design had the authenticity and energy that he remembered from the era. To help achieve this, costume designer Lesley Burkes-Harding was conscious not to dress the audience in de rigueur punk outfits. Instead, they wore a mix of seventies fashion – as not everyone attending these shows was au courant. Likewise, 6 production designer Christopher Bruce ensured that these sets were dressed as down-at- the-heel venues available for very cheap hire.

Filmmaker Jonathan Oglivie based the script on his own experiences growing up in Christchurch in the 1970s and 1980s. The cast is led by Ed Oxenbould, Márton Csókás, and Roxie Mohebbie, as well as New Zealand musician Benee in her feature film debut. Principal photography took place in Christchurch in late 2022.

== Release ==
Head South premiered as the opening night film of the 53rd International Film Festival Rotterdam on 25 January 2024. The film was part of the 2024 New Zealand International Film Festival, and had a theatrical release in New Zealand from 31 October 2024.

The film was released in Australian cinemas on 3 April 2025.

== Critical reception ==
On the review aggregator website Rotten Tomatoes, 100% of 11 critics' reviews are positive.

British film critic Peter Bradshaw, writing in The Guardian, gave the film 3 stars out of 5, praising the performances and summing it up thus: "It's a film which can't quite absorb the intense seriousness of its final moments, but a sweet-natured entertainment nonetheless". Bradshaw also further commended Ed Oxenbould for his act, he wrote "Oxenbould’s face is itself just right for this part: perpetually sporting a kind of uneasy half-smile, partly scared and baffled by everything that’s happening to him, partly excited, partly trying to display a super-cool ironic detachment from it all".

Erin Harrington, writing for New Zealand news site The Spinoff, called it "a rich, messy nostalgia trip through post-punk Ōtautahi", and praised the acting of Ed Oxenbould and Stella Bennett, along with John Chrisstoffels' "glowing cinematography" and Julie-Anne De Ruvo's "sprightly editing" and other aspects of its production. She further wrote "It pays warm tribute to Ōtautahi Christchurch’s vibrant underground post-punk scene in the 1970s and 80s, which gained international recognition and birthed the legendary Flying Nun label. It’s also a nostalgic, albeit uneven, celebration of the intensity of adolescence, a time when a scrappy new haircut, or an album shared by someone older and cooler than you, might tip your world on its axis".

Erin Free, reviewing the film in FilmInk, wrote "Drawing on his life experiences as a teen in New Zealand, Jonathan Ogilvie’s Head South is bitingly funny and incredibly moving. Michael McDonnell from New Zealand International Film Festival wrote "Drawing from his own experience growing up in Christchurch in the 1970s and ’80s, Jonathan Ogilvie’s warmly engaging film delves beneath the city’s prim and proper exterior to portray its nascent post-punk underground."
