= Your Touch Makes Others Invisible =

- Directed by: Rajee Samarasinghe
- Written by: Rajee Samarasinghe
- Produced by: Maggie Corona-Goldstein; Tabs Breese; Solomon Turner; DaManuel Richardson; Rajee Samarasinghe
- Cinematography: Kalinga Deshapriya
- Edited by: Rajee Samarasinghe
- Music by: Rafaël Leloup
- Release date: 2025
- Running time: 70 minutes
- Countries: Sri Lanka; United States
- Languages: Tamil; Sinhala; English; Russian

Your Touch Makes Others Invisible is a 2025 Sri Lankan–American hybrid documentary film directed by Rajee Samarasinghe. The film examines the aftermath of enforced disappearances in Sri Lanka following the country’s civil war.

The film premiered at the International Film Festival Rotterdam in 2025 and went on to win the Truer Than Fiction Award at the 41st Independent Spirit Awards.

== Synopsis ==
As many as 100,000 people, predominantly members of the minority Tamil community, are estimated to have disappeared during the 26-year-long Sri Lankan Civil War. Through a unique synthesis of interviews, news clips and re-enactments this docufiction reflects on this harrowing history as families search for loved ones that disappeared without a trace.

== Release ==
Your Touch Makes Others Invisible premiered at the International Film Festival Rotterdam in 2025 in the festival's Bright Future section. The film subsequently screened at various international film festivals and cinematheques.

== Reception ==
The film received critical attention for its hybrid documentary approach and its treatment of memory and political violence. Critics highlighted its blend of testimony with stylized, poetic imagery. In Filmmaker, Vadim Rizov wrote that the film proceeds along “impressionistic and spectacular lines,” using oblique strategies to approach memory and absence. Debanjan Dhar of High On Films called it “a vital, self-fracturing reckoning” and “a shifting monument to memories,” praising its “formal fluidity.” Writing for In Review Online, Michael Sicinski emphasized the film’s deliberate refusal of synthesis, moving between the everyday and the mysterious as a reflection of unresolved historical trauma.

== Accolades ==
Year	Award	Category	Recipient(s)	Result
2026	Film Independent Spirit Awards	Truer Than Fiction	Rajee Samarasinghe	Won
2025	Chicago Underground Film Festival	Jury Award for Editing	Rajee Samarasinghe	Won
2025	Austin Asian American Film Festival	Special Jury Award for Creative Vision	Rajee Samarasinghe, and Kalinga Deshapriya	Won
2025	Berwick Film & Media Arts Festival	New Cinema Award	Your Touch Makes Others Invisible	Won
2025	International Film Festival Rotterdam	NETPAC Award	Your Touch Makes Others Invisible	Nominated

== See also ==
- Cinema of Sri Lanka
