= Flathead (film) =

Australian film

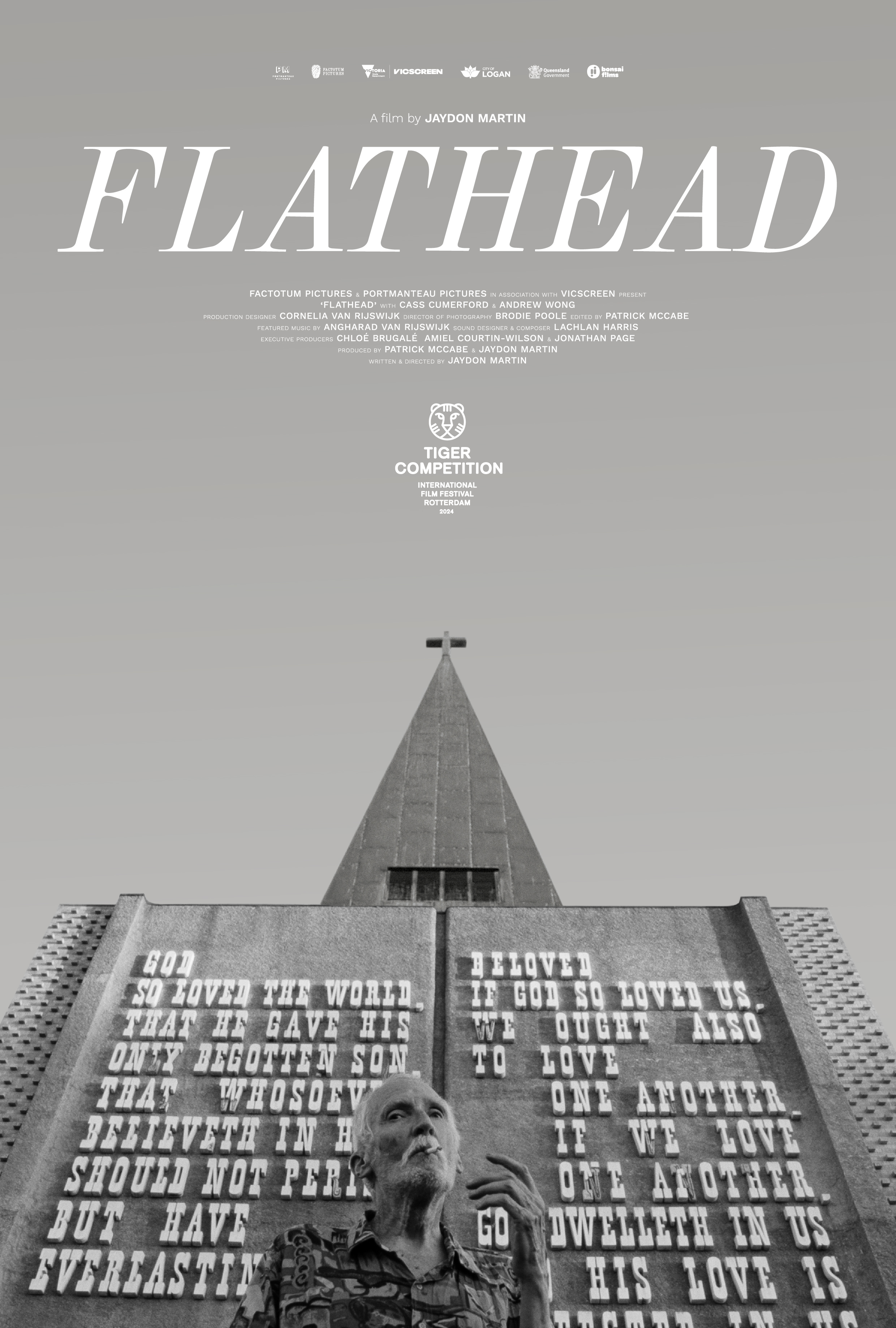
- Directed by: Jaydon Martin
- Written by: Jaydon Martin; Patrick McCabe
- Produced by: Jaydon Martin; Patrick McCabe
- Starring: Cass Cumerford; Andrew Wong
- Cinematography: Brodie Poole
- Edited by: Patrick McCabe
- Music by: Lachlan Harris; Angharad Van Rijswijk
- Production companies: Factotum Pictures; Portmanteau Pictures
- Release date: 27 April 2024
- Running time: 89 minutes
- Country: Australia
- Language: English

Flathead is a 2024 Australian docufiction film directed by Jaydon Martin about working-class Australian life. The film premiered at the 53rd International Film Festival Rotterdam, where it won a Special Jury Award in the Tiger Competition.

== Synopsis ==
Flathead tells the story of an elderly man returning home to Bundaberg and dealing with grief, among a group of working-class people.

== Cast ==
- Cass Cumerford
- Andrew Wong
- Rob Sheean
- Hayden Rimmington
- Kent Wong
- Miguel Angel Jitale D'amico
- Tim Lunnon
- Adama Suviste
- Jake Samaya
- Venerable Lama Karma Vajrasambhava Rinpoche

== Production ==
The film was shot in the town of Bundaberg, Queensland, Australia.

Amiel Courtin-Wilson and Chloe Brugale were executive producers.

== Release ==
The film premiered at the 53rd International Film Festival Rotterdam in February 2024.

Flathead went onto screen in a number of international film festivals. Selected film festival:

- São Paulo International Film Festival (Mostra),
- Warsaw International Film Festival,
- Sydney Film Festival,
- Melbourne International Film Festival,
- International Film Festival of India,
- IFF Message to Man & Gijón International Film Festival.

== Critical reception ==
Peter Bradshaw, reviewing for The Guardian, rated the film with 4 stars out of 5 and wrote "Jaydon Martin makes an outstanding feature debut with this absorbing, moving and visually beautiful docufiction... The film's poetry resides in its thoughtful inactivity, its vernacular spirituality and its gentleness."

Wendy Ide, writing for ScreenDaily, said "The film is an unvarnished, but striking account of life in this working class community."

Martin Kudlac of Screen Anarchy wrote "Flathead exhibits a level of formal polish uncharacteristic of a straightforward documentary, yet its decentralized and loosely structured approach sets it apart from conventional fiction cinema."

Shane Danielsen, writing in The Monthly, described the film as "Elegant, patient and humane". Carmen Gray wrote in the Sight and Sound's Weekly Film Bulletin about the film: "The docufiction, with its distinctive vision of spiritual questing in a poor part of Queensland, maximised absurdist detail and laidback sardonic wit while still conferring dignity on its subjects".

== Accolades ==
Flathead won the Tiger Competition Special Jury Award at the 53rd International Film Festival Rotterdam, with Variety reporting the jury's comments on the film: "calm but touching execution ... a naturalistic and realistic film at its best".

Jaydon Martin won The Blackmagic Design Australian Innovation Award recognises an outstanding Australian creative within a film playing in the MIFF program. The jury statement: 'We were captivated and affected by director Jaydon Martin's visually arresting and very moving portrait of individuals often forgotten about in society – in this case, the real people of small-town Bundaberg. Flathead's seamless merging of realities and fiction, both so raw yet so cinematic, had a profound effect on our jury'.
