= Tomoyuki Furumaya =

Japanese film director (born 1968)

- Born: 14 November 1968 (age 57); Nagano Prefecture, Japan
- Occupation: Film director

Tomoyuki Furumaya (古厩 智之, Furumaya Tomoyuki) (born 14 November 1968) is a Japanese film director.

== Career ==
Born in Nagano Prefecture, Furumaya was attending Nihon University when his 16mm film, Shakunetsu no dojjibōru, won the grand prize at the Pia Film Festival. That earned him a Pia Scholarship to make his first theatrical feature, This Window Is Yours, a film that won the first Dragons and Tigers Award at the Vancouver International Film Festival and helped him get the Directors Guild of Japan New Directors Award in 1994. His film Bad Company won a Tiger Award and the FIPRESCI Award at the 2001 Rotterdam Film Festival. Sayonara Midori-chan also was the runner-up in the competition at the 2005 Three Continents Festival. He has also worked on such television programs as Mori no Asagao.

Furumaya is married to the actress Miako Tadano.

== Selected filmography ==
=== Films ===
- Shakunetsu no dojjibōru (灼熱のドッジボール) (1992)
- This Window Is Yours (この窓は君のもの, Kono mado wa kimi no mono) (1994)
- Bad Company (まぶだち, Mabudachi) (2001)
- Sayonara Midori-chan (さよならみどりちゃん) (2005)
- The Homeless Student (ホームレス中学生) (2008)
- Killing Curriculum: Jinroh Shokei Game - Prologue (2015)
- Kotera-san Climbs! (2020)
- Play! (2024)

=== Television series ===
- Mori no Asagao (2010)
- Candy Color Paradox (2023)
- Happy of the End (2024)
