= Azul no Azul =

2022 Portuguese short film by Gianmarco Donaggio and Nelson Ferreira

- Directed by: Gianmarco Donaggio
- Produced by: Gianmarco Donaggio Nelson Ferreira
- Cinematography: Gianmarco Donaggio
- Edited by: Gianmarco Donaggio
- Release date: 28 July 2022
- Running time: 6 min
- Country: Portugal
- Language: silent

Azul no Azul (English title: Blue in Blue) is a short Portuguese experimental film created by Italian filmmaker Gianmarco Donaggio and Portuguese painter Nelson Ferreira. The film was produced and distributed in collaboration with the National Museum of Contemporary Art in Portugal, and it premiered at the museum on the 28th of July 2022, after which it was exhibited in the cinema of the museum from the 29th of July until the 15th of September 2022. A second version was created for Soares dos Reis National Museum to celebrate the 150 years of the sculpture ‘The Exiled’ by António Soares dos Reis and was continuously screened at the museum from the 10th of December 2022 until 19 March 2023. The city of Lucca projected it on a loop for a week. Listed by Berlinale Talents when the director was nominated as Talent in 2024. The film was later consecrated in Portugal, where it was screened at the Portuguese Cinematheque. Art critic Simona Frigerio compared this film to Derek Jarman's last masterpiece Blue.

== Description ==
Azul no Azul was ideated by the two artists as an experiment in which Donaggio was translating in cinematic form the painting process of Ferreira's blue series, a collection of paintings that the artist completed over his stay as an artist in residency at MNAC in Lisbon. As the museum curator stated: "In this cycle of contemporary works Nelson's reverence for the great classical masters and academic tradition is attested." As a consequence, in the make of Azul no Azul, Donaggio was called to the task of adapting the act of filming to both the effect and the process of challenging painting techniques such as of alla prima - painted directly looking at the subject, and the classic statuary tradition of the subjects depicted. The result is a film experience of blue shapes taking the form of the classical sculptures of the museum sculpture garden, and vice versa, the sculptures melting into blue informal elements.

== See also ==
- List of avant-garde films of the 2020s
