= Sayonara Midori-chan =

Japanese manga

さよならみどりちゃん
- Manga
- Written by: Kyūta Minami
- Published by: Shodensha
- Magazine: Feel Young
- Original run: 1996 – 1997
- Live-action film
- Directed by: Tomoyuki Furumaya
- Released: August 27, 2005

Sayonara Midori-chan (さよならみどりちゃん; "Good-bye Midori-chan") is a Japanese manga by Kyūta Minami. It was adapted into a live-action film in 2005.

== Awards ==
27th Yokohama Film Festival

- 10th Best Film
