= Mabudachi =

2001 film by Tomoyuki Furumaya

- Film poster
- Directed by: Tomoyuki Furumaya
- Written by: Tomoyuki Furumaya
- Produced by: Takenori Sento
- Starring: Yamato Okitsu; Ryōsuke Takahashi; Yuta Nakajima
- Cinematography: Masami Inomoto
- Edited by: Shuichi Kakesu
- Music by: Masamichi Shigeno
- Production companies: J-Movie Wars; Bandai Visual; Suncent CinemaWorks; Wowow
- Release dates: 1 February 2001 (IFFR); 17 November 2001 (Japan)
- Running time: 98 minutes
- Country: Japan
- Language: Japanese

Mabudachi (Japanese: まぶだち), known in English as Bad Company, is a 2001 Japanese semi-autobiographical drama film written and directed by Tomoyuki Furumaya. Set in the 1980s, it follows the lives of a class of secondary school students and their strict teacher, who creates a "humanity index" that divides his students into the categories of "delinquents", "scum" and "people". The film traces the fallout of this teaching method on the students' psychology, their delinquency as a form of rebellion, and the physical abuse they suffer at home. It stars Yamato Okitsu, Ryōsuke Takahashi, Yuta Nakajima, Ken Mitsuishi, Mikio Shimizu, Asako Yashiro and Hiroko Akune. Mabudachi premiered at the 30th International Film Festival Rotterdam on 1 February 2001, before being released in Japan on 17 November 2001.

== Cast ==
- Yamato Okitsu as Sadatomo Kōzu
- Ryōsuke Takahashi as Tetsuya Nimura
- Yuta Nakajima as Shuji Nomura
- Ken Mitsuishi as Yoshiyuki Kōzu (Sadatomo's Father)
- Mikio Shimizu as Professor Kobayashi
- Asako Yashiro as Yoriko Kōzu (Sadatomo's Mother)
- Hiroko Akune as Yuriko

== Production ==
Mabudachi was co-produced by Suncent CinemaWorks. The company was founded by Takenori Sento, who was one of the producers of the original Ringu. Sento created Suncent after the success of his wife Naomi Kawase's Suzaku.

Director Furumaya suffered a creative block after his debut project, This Window is Yours. Mabudachi was his return to filmmaking after a seven-year hiatus.

== Release ==
Mabudachi premiered at the 30th International Film Festival Rotterdam on 1 February 2001, where it won a Tiger Award and the FIPRESCI Prize, before being released in Japan on 17 November 2001.

== Reception ==
Writing for Senses of Cinema from IFFR, Christoph Huber stated that he was "pleased" that Mabudachi was announced as one of the three winners of the festival's Tiger Awards. He described the film as a "leisurely paced" yet "promising second feature" with "a sharp sense of spatial dynamics." Huber also wrote that Mabudachi, despite containing no unexpected twists, was "filled with surprising gestures and moments, often provoking conflicting emotions within the same frame."

Tom Mes of Midnight Eye wrote that Mabudachi "contrasts conformity with free individual thought in a manner that is challenging and thought-provoking." He compared it positively to the works of Stanley Kubrick; specifically, Mes compared Shimizu's character to R. Lee Ermey's drill sergeant in Full Metal Jacket, and the film's structure to that of A Clockwork Orange. Mes also described Mabudachi as a "gem", stating that it "went largely unnoticed at the time, a fate undeserving of this small but significant... film."

Mes later listed Mabudachi as his fourth favorite Japanese film of 2001. The film also placed 11th in the readers' poll for the same year.

== Awards and nominations ==
30th International Film Festival Rotterdam

- Won: Tiger Award
- Won: FIPRESCI Award

4th Jeonju International Film Festival

- Nominated: Woosuk Award (Tomoyuki Furumaya)
