= Rajee Samarasinghe =

Director and filmmaker

- Born: January 12, 1988 (age 38); Colombo
- Education: University of California San Diego (BA); California Institute of the Arts (MFA)
- Occupation: Filmmaker
- Awards: Guggenheim Fellowship; Film Independent Spirit Award for Truer Than Fiction
- Website: envythemonster.com

Rajee Ranpathi Samarasinghe (born January 12, 1988) is a Sri Lankan filmmaker and visual artist. His work explores a wide array of topics including the Sri Lankan Civil War, his family, and the deconstruction of documentary and narrative film.

== Early life and education ==
Samarasinghe was born in Colombo, Sri Lanka, in 1988, during the Sri Lankan Civil War. Initially interested in illustration, his focus later shifted to film. He received a Bachelor of Fine Arts in Visual Arts (Media) from the University of California San Diego and a Master of Fine Arts in Film and Video from the California Institute of the Arts.

== Career ==
Samarasinghe's 2016 short film, If I Were Any Further Away I’d Be Closer to Home, premiered in the international competition at the 62nd International Short Film Festival Oberhausen. The fim won the Film House Award for Visionary Filmmaking at the 44th Athens International Film and Video Festival and screened at the 27th FIDMarseille as well as the 60th San Francisco International Film Festival where it was a Golden Gate Award nominee.

Samarasinghe's 2018 short film, Piṭuvahalayā (The Exile), which examines Sri Lanka's post-war era, premiered in the international competition at the 64th International Short Film Festival Oberhausen and subsequently screened at the 62nd BFI London Film Festival.

Samarasinghe's 2020 short film, The Eyes of Summer, which explores his mother's interactions with spirits during her childhood, premiered in the Tiger Short Competition at the 49th International Film Festival Rotterdam, and was included in the 49th New Directors/New Films presented by Film Society of Lincoln Center & MoMA, the 26th Slamdance Film Festival, and the 49th Festival du nouveau cinéma. The film also went on to win the Tíos Award for Best International Film at the 58th Ann Arbor Film Festival.

Samarasinghe's debut feature film, Your Touch Makes Others Invisible, has received support from the Sundance Institute, Berlinale Talents, and Field of Vision.

In 2020, he was named one of Filmmaker Magazine’s 25 New Faces of Independent Film and in 2021 he had a solo exhibition at the Museum of Modern Art in the context of their Modern Mondays series.

In 2025, his debut feature film Your Touch Makes Others Invisible was featured in the Bright Future section of the 54th International Film Festival Rotterdam. That same year, he was awarded a Guggenheim Fellowship. He also won the Truer Than Fiction Award at the 2026 Film Independent Spirit Awards for Your Touch Makes Others Invisible.

In 2026, he released a coda to Your Touch Makes Others Invisible called A Flower Falling Back Into the Earth which had its world premiere in the international competition at the 72nd International Short Film Festival Oberhausen.
