= 75B =

75B is a design studio based in Rotterdam, Netherlands.

They designed the identity for the International Film Festival Rotterdam, Ro Theatre, Van Abbemuseum, and Codarts. They also made autonomous works that were exhibited at the Fons Welters Gallery in Amsterdam and are part of the collection of Stedelijk Museum Amsterdam, SF MOMA and the Graphic Design Museum Breda.

== Works ==
- 2000 The design of the skatepark on the southern edge of Rotterdam's central business district.
- 2001 Exhibition Kijk hier es naar Fons Welters Gallery Amsterdam
- 2006 Designs for the Exhibition It's All Dalí on Salvador Dalí for Museum Boijmans van Beuningen
- 2007 Design campaign Rotterdam 2007 City of Architecture awarded by IMCA
- 2009 Identity for International Film Festival Rotterdam

== History ==
75B was founded by Robert Beckand, Rens Muis and Pieter Vos in 1997. They met during their study at the Willem de Kooning Academy in Rotterdam, Netherlands. In 2006 they were artist in residence at Art Center College of Design in Pasadena. In 2009 Beckand left the studio and Muis and Vos continued working together.

== Publications ==
- Trees J, Nugent L, Hafermaas N, Johnston S, 75B LAX, Veenman Publishers, Rotterdam 2008 (ISBN 9086901247)
- Coyner B, 75B 10x10, Veenman Publishers, Rotterdam 2006 (ISBN 90-8690-021-6)
- Rhode C, Platteel A, Symbol Soup -Look-, Thames & Hudson, London 1999, (ISBN 9072007492)
- Holland International, Dutch Design Dead, 1998
