= Leonardo Pirondi =

Brazilian Filmmaker

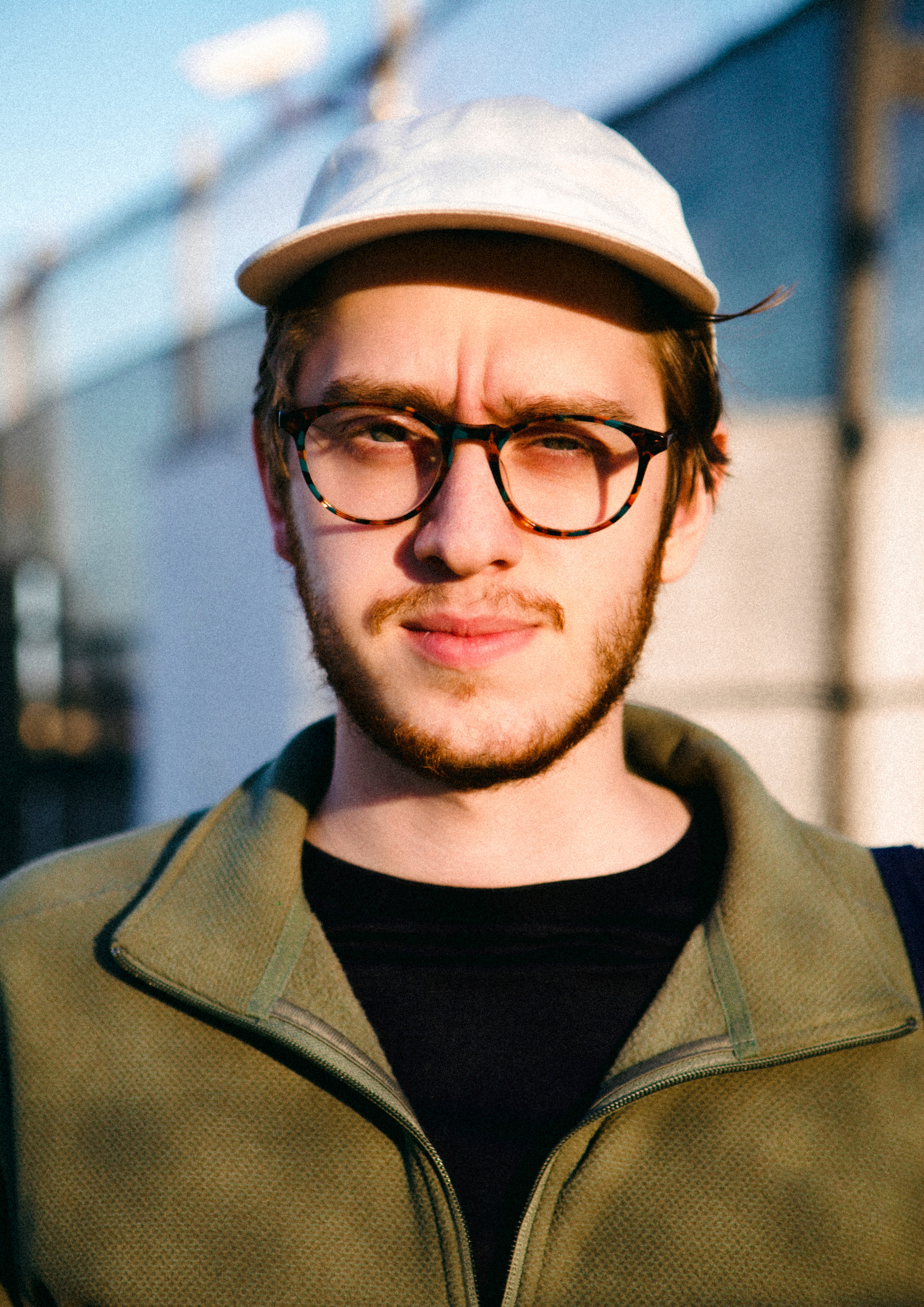
- Born: São Paulo, Brazil
- Education: California Institute of the Arts (BFA, MFA)
- Occupation: Film Director
- Website: www.leonardopirondi.com

Leonardo Pirondi is a Brazilian film director from São Paulo. Pirondi's work explores the intersection between fiction and non-fiction filmmaking using non-conventional structures of documentary, experimental, and narrative modes. In his films he explores contemporary sociopolitical issues and collective anxieties as a lens to look into history, imagination, myth, and technology.

== Education ==
Leonardo Pirondi studied filmmaking at the California Institute of the Arts (CalArts), in an analog and 16 mm focussed film program with an avant-garde/experimental film tradition, located in Valencia, California. He holds both B.F.A and M.F.A degrees from the Film/Video program.

== Career ==
His films have been presented at the Toronto International Film Festival, International Film Festival Rotterdam, New York Film Festival (Currents), Vienna International Film Festival, Mar del Plata International Film Festival, BFI London Film Festival, Festival du nouveau cinéma, Slamdance, Melbourne International Film Festival, Edinburgh International Film Festival, Centre de Cultura Contemporànea de Barcelona, and REDCAT.

Some of his films exist in the UCLA Film and Television Archive, The Film-Makers' Cooperative in New York, and were deposited at the Cinematheque of the Museum of Modern Art, Rio de Janeiro after the 4th edition of the 1666 Festival Internacional de Cinema 16mm. He has had solo and retrospective showings of his films at the Spectacle Theater in New York City, and Galeria Mola in Portugal. He took part in the 2023 Sundance Ignite X Adobe Fellowship.

Pirondi's first co-authored project, the 2023 short film titled When We Encounter the World, was co-directed with Zazie Ray-Trapido and it premiered at the 32nd Curtas Vila do Conde followed by the North American Premiere at the 61st New York Film Festival, the Austrian Premiere at the 61st Viennale, and selected to additional exhibitions at 15th Crossroads by the San Francisco Cinematheque, San Diego Underground Film Festival. The film was also shown alongside an interactive exhibition at Galeria Mola in Portugal.

Pirondi's 2024 short film, Potenciais à Deriva [Adrift Potentials], premiered at the 53rd International Film Festival Rotterdam as part of the Tiger Short Competition, with a North American premiere at the 49th Toronto International Film Festival (Wavelengths) and selected to the 62nd Viennale, 53rd Festival du nouveau cinéma, 49th Mar del Plata International Film Festival, 33rd Curtas Vila do Conde, and 77th Edinburgh International Film Festival. In 2025 the film was selected to the Hong Kong International Film Festival, Prismatic Ground in New York City, and the Umbrales de Vanguardias Latinoamericanas competition at FICUNAM (Festival Internacional de Cine de UNAM).

Pirondi was selected for the fourth edition of the Locarno Residency, which took place during the 78th Locarno Film Festival. He participated with a feature film project in development titled AMERIKA'ATINGA. He received the Paradiso Grant, a support from the Brazilian philanthropic initiative named Projeto Paradiso by the Olga Rabinovich Institute, to attend the Locarno Residency and he also became part of the Paradiso Talent Network.

In 2025, he was named one of Filmmaker Magazine's 25 New Faces of Independent Film and he was awarded a MacDowell Fellowship for the Fall '25 Winter '26 cycle.

Pirondi's 2026 short films, Memórias Encontradas Numa Banheira [Memoirs Found in a Bathtub] and Suíte dos Viajantes [Travelers' Suite], premiered at the International Selections at the 72nd International Short Film Festival Oberhausen and the 39th European Media Art Festival, respectively.

In 2026, his debut feature Fractais Tropicais [Tropical Fractals], starring Ivo Müller and Valentina Rosset, premiered in the National Competition at the 23rd IndieLisboa International Film Festival. Followed by screenings at film festivals and art institutions such as the 70th BFI London Film Festival (Experimenta strand), 33rd Chicago Underground Film Festival, 50th Mostra São Paulo International Film Festival (New Directors Competition), 29th Montreal International Documentary Festival (RIDM) and the REDCAT Theater.

In 2026, Leonardo had focus program dedicated to his work at the Lumen Rio de Janeiro Independent Film Festival, named Pirondi! Pirondi! Pirondi!, presenting Leonardo's debut feature film Tropical Fractals, alongside two of Leonardo's 2026 short films, Memoirs Found in a Bathtub and Travelers' Suite. The program will take place on 8 November 2026 at the Cinematheque of the Museum of Modern Art, Rio de Janeiro and on 12 November 2026 at Centro Cultural Banco do Brasil.

== Filmography ==
Year	Original title	English title	Length	Country	Notes	Ref.
2026	Fractais Tropicais	Tropical Fractals	72 minutes	PortugalBrazil	Debut feature film	
2026	Memórias Encontradas Numa Banheira	Memoirs Found in a Bathtub	4 minutes	BrazilPortugal	Short film	
2026	Suíte dos Viajantes	Travelers' Suite	7 minutes	BrazilPortugal	Short film	
2024	Potenciais à Deriva	Adrift Potentials	11 minutes	BrazilUSA	Short film	
2023	Seja Bem-Vindo ao Lar	Welcome Home	4 minutes	USA	Short film	
2023	When We Encounter The World		11 minutes	PortugalUSA	Short film Co-directed with Zazie Ray-Trapido	
2022	Effulgent Gleam		7 minutes	BrazilUSA	Short film	
2022	Visão do Paraíso	Vision of Paradise	16 minutes	BrazilUK USA	Short film	
2021	In Search of Mount Analogue		4 minutes	BrazilUSA	Short film	
2021	If a Tree Falls in a Forest		15 minutes	BrazilUSA	Short film	
2020	Benning's Dream		2 minutes	USA	Animated short film starring James Benning	
2020	Earth had issues Loading...		9 minutes	BrazilUSA	Short film	
2019	This is Mine, This is Yours		3 minutes	BrazilUSA	Short film	

== Awards and nominations ==
Year	Result	Event	Category/Award	Work	Ref.
2026	Nominated	32nd Caminhos do Cinema Português	Seleção Caminhos	Tropical Fractals	
2026	Nominated	50th Mostra São Paulo International Film Festival	New Directors Competition	Tropical Fractals	
2026	Nominated	33rd Chicago Underground Film Festival	Narrative Features	Tropical Fractals	
2026	Nominated	23rd IndieLisboa International Film Festival	National Competition	Tropical Fractals	
2026	Nominated	72nd International Short Film Festival Oberhausen	International Competition	Memoirs Found in a Bathtub	
2026	Nominated	34th Curtas Vila do Conde	Experimental Competition	Travelers' Suite	
2026	Nominated	39th European Media Art Festival	International Selection	Travelers' Suite	
2025	Nominated	15th FICUNAM (Festival Internacional de Cine de UNAM)	Competencia Umbrales de Vanguardias Latinoamericanas	Adrift Potentials	
2024	Nominated	39th Mar del Plata Film Festival	Competencia Estados Alterados	Adrift Potentials	
2024	Nominated	53rd Festival du nouveau cinéma	Les nouveaux alchimistes Competition	Adrift Potentials	
2024	Nominated	77th Edinburgh International Film Festival	Experimental Shorts	Adrift Potentials	
2024	Nominated	32nd Curtas Vila do Conde	Experimental Competition	Adrift Potentials	
2024	Nominated	37th European Media Art Festival	International Competition	Welcome Home	
2024	Nominated	53rd International Film Festival Rotterdam	Tiger Short Award Competition	Adrift Potentials	
2024	Nominated	30th Slamdance Film Festival	Documentary Short Grand Jury Prize	Vision of Paradise	
2023	Nominated	31st Curtas Vila do Conde	Experimental Competition	When We Encounter The World	
2023	Won	26th Brooklyn Film Festival	Best Experimental Award	Vision of Paradise	
2023	Nominated	20th Vienna Shorts	FIDO Competition	Vision of Paradise	
2023	Nominated	26th Guanajuato International Film Festival	International Documentary	Vision of Paradise	
2023	Nominated	23rd DokuFest	International Short DOX	Vision of Paradise	
