= Mori no Asagao =

Japanese manga and television series

モリのアサガオ
- Manga
- Written by: Mamora Gōda
- Published by: Futabasha
- Magazine: Weekly Manga Action
- Original run: 2004 – 2007
- Television drama
- Directed by: Akimitsu Sasaki
- Produced by: Shinji Okabe; Junpei Nakagawa; Noboru Morita; Atsushi Kurosawa
- Written by: Daisuke Habara, Shizuka Oki
- Music by: Toshiyuki Watanabe
- Original network: TV Tokyo
- Original run: October 18, 2010 – December 20, 2010
- Episodes: 10

Mori no Asagao (モリのアサガオ; "The Forest's Morning Glories") is a Japanese manga series by Mamora Gōda. It won the 11th Grand Prize for manga at the Japan Media Arts Festival in 2007. It was adapted into a live-action television drama in 2010.

== Synopsis ==
New prison guard Naoki Oikawa gets assigned to the death row section. He strikes a friendship with Watase Mitsuru, who, rather conveniently (contrast with Freeze Me), far from being a sadist, a sociopathic killer or rapist, dangerous to society or even particularly cruel, is actually quite a sympathetic character, someone that, unable to get justice from the system, killed the man that murdered his parents. The fact that he did not target defenceless and innocent victims for no good reason, but rather had a motive that could be understood, allows the guard to put himself in his shoes and understand his reasons and point of view, and provides a contrast between the unfairness of his circumstances, his undeserved fate, and the fact that system had failed to vindicate his parents, leaving him with no other alternative besides being cast in the role of the powerless victim. Gradually Naoki begins to wonder about the necessity of the death penalty and the meanings of such concepts as repentance and forgiveness.

== Television series ==
=== Cast ===
- Atsushi Itō – Naoki Oikawa (22)
- Arata – Mitsuru Watase (22)
- Yuu Kashii – Asami Sawasaki (Oikawa's girlfriend) (22)
- Haruka Kinami – Kana Mochizuki (19)
- Akira Emoto – Keizukuri Hukahori (59)
- Sansei Shiomi – Yuzo Wakaboyashi (62)
- Mitsuki Tanimura – Yoshioka Koharu
- Youichi Nukumizu – Toshikazu Seko
- Bengal – Toshiyuki Tanizaki
- Masahiro Toda – Kazuaki Satonaka
- Yasuyuki Maekawa – Ryo Goto
- Ren Oosugi – Seido Oikawa (Oikawa's father)
- Yoshie Ichige – Sawako Oikawa (Oikawa's mother)
- Akiko Aizuki – Takako Toma

=== Guest ===
- Shido Nakamura – Tadashishi Kouzai (ep1)
- Naomasa Musaka – Akira Ishimine (ep1)
- Koji Ohkura – Katsuhiro Hoshiyama (ep1-2)
- Yuri Nakamura – Taeko Kuramoti (ep2)
- Mitsuru Hirata – Takeshi Sasano (ep3)
- Mari Hamada – Victim's parents (ep3)
- Yumiko Shaku – Yuko Nishida (ep4-5)
- Kanji Tsuda – Sako Nishi (ep4-5,7)
- Yuki Imai – Shinya Hukuda (ep4-5)
- Hiromasa Taguchi – Kengo Hukuda (ep5)
- Ryo Ishibashi – Eichiro Akashi (ep6)
- Minoru Tanaka – Takashi Touzyou (ep6)
- Kotaro Shiga – Chief Justice (ep6)
- Mashima Hidekazu – Kento Yamamoto (ep7)
- Saki Matsuda – Miyoko Yoshikawa (ep7)
- Yojin Hino – President of shipping company (ep7)
- Rei Okamoto – Kazuko Funaki (ep7)
- Mayuko Nishiyama – (ep8)

=== Episode information ===
Episode	Title	Writer	Director	Original airdate	Ratings (Kanto)
1	New prison officers to move hearts and condemned "bonds" story (新人刑務官と死刑囚心動かす"絆"物語)	Daisuke Habara	Akimitsu Sasaki	Oct 18, 2010; 22.00 – 23.09	5.8
2	Instruction execution (死刑執行命令)	Daisuke Habara	Akimitsu Sasaki	Oct 25, 2010; 22.00 – 22.54	3.8
3	Give flowers to the condemned (死刑囚へ贈る花)	Shizuka Oki	Makito Murakami	Nov 1, 2010; 22.00 – 22.54	4.6
4	Wedding Bride prison (獄中結婚の花嫁)	Daisuke Habara	Makito Murakami	Nov 8, 2010; 22.00 – 22.54	4.3
5	Capital punishment against the families? (極刑反対の遺族!?)	Shizuka Oki	Tomoyuki Furumaya	Nov 15, 2010; 22.00 – 22.54	4.1
6	Gray man 33 years of false accusation (冤罪33年の白髪男)	Daisuke Habara	Munenobu Yamauchi	Nov 22, 2010; 22.00 – 22.54	3.2
7	Father's death row prison guard rookie!! (新人刑務官の父の死刑囚!!)	Daisuke Habara	Munenobu Yamauchi	Nov 29, 2010; 22.00 – 22.54	2.2
8	Visits last miracle (最期の面会の奇跡)	Shizuka Oki	Tomoyuki Furumaya	Dec 6, 2010; 22.00 – 22.54	3.0
9	To the final chapter! Siblings Cry of the Soul Secrets (最終章へ! 魂の叫び兄妹の秘密)	Tago Akihiro; Shizuka Oki	Akimitsu Sasaki	Dec 13, 2010; 22.00 – 22.54	2.2
10	Only to one person familiar with the last ... (たった一人の親友へ最後の...)	Shizuka Oki	Akimitsu Sasaki	Dec 20, 2010; 22.00 – 22.54	2.9
Viewership ratings: 3.6%
