= Animalia Paradoxa (film) =

- Theatrical release poster
- Directed by: Niles Atallah
- Written by: Niles Atallah
- Produced by: Catalina Vergara
- Starring: Andrea Gómez
- Cinematography: Matías Illanes
- Edited by: Mayra Morán; Niles Atallah
- Music by: Sebastián Jatz
- Production companies: Diluvio; Globo Rojo Producciones
- Distributed by: StoryBoard Media Distribución
- Release dates: January 30, 2024 (IFFR); December 5, 2024 (Chile)
- Running time: 83 minutes
- Country: Chile
- Language: Spanish

Animalia Paradoxa is a 2024 Chilean avant-garde science fiction drama film written, co-edited and directed by Niles Atallah. It is set in a post-apocalyptic world where species dream of evolving to survive in their habitat. The film combines stop-motion animation and live-action footage.

== Synopsis ==
Set in a future ravaged by environmental destruction, the film follows the life of a humanoid creature named Animalia, whose dream is to reach the ocean, a place she only knows through old recordings. Struggling to survive in a desolate, waterless world, Animalia turns to her imagination to escape her reality. In this dark and surreal atmosphere, the film explores resilience and the search for a better world, amidst a devastated landscape filled with mysteries that will never be explained.

== Cast ==
- Andrea Gómez as Animalia

== Production ==
Principal photography took place at the Cine Arte Alameda, Santiago.

== Release ==
Animalia Paradoxa had its world premiere on January 30, 2024, at the 53rd International Film Festival Rotterdam, then screened on July 20, 2024, at the 28th Fantasia International Film Festival, on November 3, 2024, at the 38th Leeds International Film Festival, on November 19, 2024, at the 32nd International Film Festival of the Art of Cinematography Camerimage, and on November 24, 2024, at the 55th International Film Festival of India.

The film was commercially released on December 5, 2024, in Chilean theaters.

== Critical reception ==
Animalia Paradoxa received a mixed but generally appreciative critical response, with reviewers particularly praising its visual experimentation, physical performances, and combination of live action, stop-motion animation, and performance art, while some criticized its slow pace and deliberately elusive narrative. Carmen Gray of The Film Verdict, reviewing the film at the International Film Festival Rotterdam, described it as a "mesmeric" post-apocalyptic world and praised Atallah's combination of stop-motion and live action, calling the film's craft and distinctive visual design its principal strengths. She noted that its largely wordless form would appeal particularly to viewers interested in experimentation and atmosphere rather than conventional narrative development. Writing for In Review Online during the film's Fantasia screening, Öykü Sofuoğlu characterized Animalia Paradoxa as a "baffling piece of multisensory art", emphasizing its surreal depiction of a world devastated by human destruction. She praised Andrea Gómez's physically demanding performance and Atallah's creation of an uncategorizable world, while arguing that the film's approach differs from more conventional dystopian cinema by resisting explanatory world-building and narrative resolution. Ángel Pérez, writing for Rialta, described the film as an "amphibious" work whose formal qualities are as important as its narrative. Pérez praised Atallah's use of materiality and composition to move beyond cinematic realism, characterizing the film as a plastic and sensory experience. He particularly highlighted the relationship between the protagonist's body, the camera, and the ruined spaces in which she moves, arguing that the film uses choreography and physical performance to create estrangement rather than conventional identification. Pérez also singled out the film's combination of live action, dance, and stop-motion, describing its final animated sequence as one of its most lyrical passages.

Other critics were more reserved. Thomas Wishloff of In The Seats praised the film's black-and-white imagery, Gómez's physical performance, and its mixture of cinematic forms, but found that the feature ultimately failed to cohere as a whole, suggesting that its material might have worked better as a shorter experimental film. Similarly, a review in The Geek Show praised the film's striking imagery and atmosphere but criticized its slow pacing and abstract plot, arguing that its ideas might have been more effective in a shorter format.

Alex Brannan of CineFiles Movie Reviews emphasized the film's ecological themes, particularly its depiction of scarcity, destruction, and the protagonist's longing for the sea. He praised Gómez's performance and Atallah's combination of highly stylized imagery, stop-motion, and visual storytelling, concluding that the film's resistance to categorization was one of its strengths.

== Accolades ==
Year	Award / Festival	Category	Recipient	Result	Ref.
2024	36th Viña del Mar International Film Festival	Best Film – National Feature Competition	Animalia Paradoxa	Won	
