= The Swimming Pool (2012 film) =

- Film poster
- Spanish: La Piscina
- Directed by: Carlos Machado Quintela
- Written by: Abel Arcos
- Produced by: Sebastian Barriuso, Camilo Vives, Delfina Catala, Isabel Prendes
- Starring: Elena Molinet, Carlos Javier Martínez
- Cinematography: Raul Rodríguez
- Production company: ICAIC
- Release date: December 2012 (Havana)
- Running time: 66 minutes
- Country: Cuba
- Language: Spanish

The Swimming Pool (Spanish: La Piscina) is a 2012 Cuban art house film directed by Carlos M. Quintela and produced by Cuban-Canadian filmmaker Sebastian Barriuso. The film premiered at the 2012 Havana Film Festival, and later showed at the 2013 Berlin International Film Festival as part of the Panorama Special section.

== Synopsis ==
The film follows a swimming instructor and his four disabled students – Diana, whose leg has been amputated; Oscar, who refuses to speak; Dani, who has Down Syndrome; and Rodrigo, who has a mobility issues – and the tense conflict that arises between them.

== Cast ==
- Raúl Capote
- Mónica Molinet
- Felipe García
- Carlos Javier Martínez
- Marcos Costa

== Critical reception ==
It was described as "contemplative and enigmatic" by Deborah Young of The Hollywood Reporter. Jaie Laplante, Director of programming of the Miami Film Festival gave the film a positive review "In Carlos Machado Quintela's debut feature film, which held its North American premiere at the 2013 Miami Dade College's Miami Film Festival, a minimalist aesthetic and extraordinary control of frame and composition question traditional patterns of cinematic syntax. The boundaries of the swimming pool wash away into the endless horizon, which is at once loaded and; the scarcity of dialogue or spoken communication simultaneously suggests scar, respite, and threat." Dean Luis Reyes praised Quintela’s assured direction stating that "through the characters’ prolonged silences or whispers, we gain access to a way of understanding the Seventh Art that stands far removed from the testimonial ambitions of Cuban cinema."

== Awards ==
- 2011 – Association of Film, Radio and Television of the UNEAC Award, 33rd Havana International Festival of New Latin American Cinema.
- 2012 – Best First Feature, 10th Festival Internacional del Cine Pobre, Gibara.
- 2013 – Lexus Ibero-American Opera Prima Award (shared with Solo), Miami International Film Festival.
- 2013 – Jury Award, World Cinema Amsterdam.
- 2013 – Golden Angel for Best Director, Tofifest International Film Festival.
- 2013 – Jury Prize (ex aequo), Marrakech International Film Festival.

== See also ==
- Cinema of Cuba

== Bibliography ==
- Prout, Ryan (2020). "Still Waters Run Deep: Disability Counter Currents in La piscina (2012)." In Susanne Hartwig (ed.), Inclusión, integración, diferenciación: la diversidad funcional en la literatura, el cine y las artes escénicas. Berlin: Peter Lang, pp. 275–291. ISBN 978-3-631-81506-9.
