= Rei (film) =

2024 Japanese drama film directed by Toshihiko Tanaka

Rei is a 2024 Japanese drama film directed by Toshihiko Tanaka. The film had its world premiere in the Tiger Competition section at the 2024 International Film Festival Rotterdam. The film also won the Tiger Award at the 53rd edition of the International Film Festival Rotterdam. The film opened to generally positive reviews from critics while the direction, screenplay and Ikeda Akio's cinematography were praised.

== Synopsis ==
Hikari who is in her early thirties being in the important phase of her life, apparently lives and works in Tokyo dealing with a typical 9-5 corporate job. Despite the challenges posed by the uncertainties of life, she does not look to be distracted and seems be in a positive frame of mind and she has no particular problems, but she is unable to know her own value and hence she is in a dilemma over existential crisis mainly due to the loneliness she has to cope up with. On the other hand, cut the long story short, the people around her have their own inner struggles. Every individual has their own counterparts, and they balance their lifestyles by emotionally connecting with each other. Hikari on a serendipitous occasion, meets a deaf landscape photographer who lives around the mountain range of Hokkaido, which is significantly distant away from Tokyo. Hikari begins to discover the value of her own existence after her bond with the deaf photographer, which sadly ends up in an opportunity cost in terms of sacrificing the relationships with those around her.

== Production ==
Toshihiko Tanaka found himself facing a situation of underemployment after theater owners in Japan decided to close down the theatres on a temporary basis due to the impact of the COVID-19 pandemic, which eventually sent shockwaves and a wakeup call to the theatre actors to adapt to the new normal by practicing a paradigm shift approach. He collaborated and teamed up with fellow thespian Akio Ikeda to produce a feature film exclusively appealing for the audiences at international film festivals. He eventually decided to make his directorial debut with the film project and he began working with cast and crew of consisting of mainly non professionals and students.

== Premiere ==
The film was premiered at the 2024 Las Palmas Film Festival, 2024 New Horizons International Film Festival and 2024 Cartagena Film Festival.
