= Cinerama (Rotterdam) =

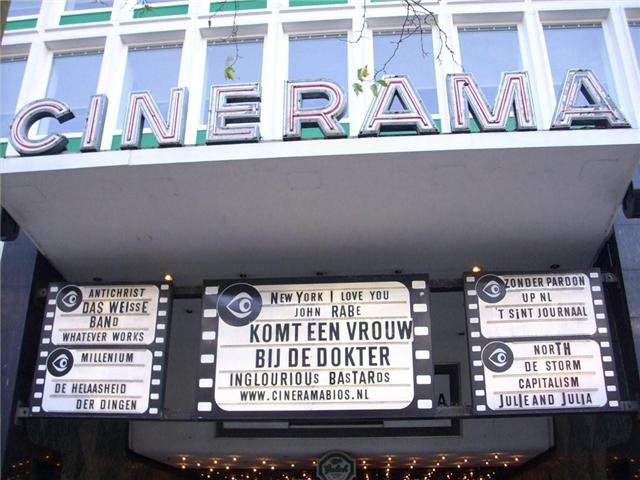
- Cinerama from outside

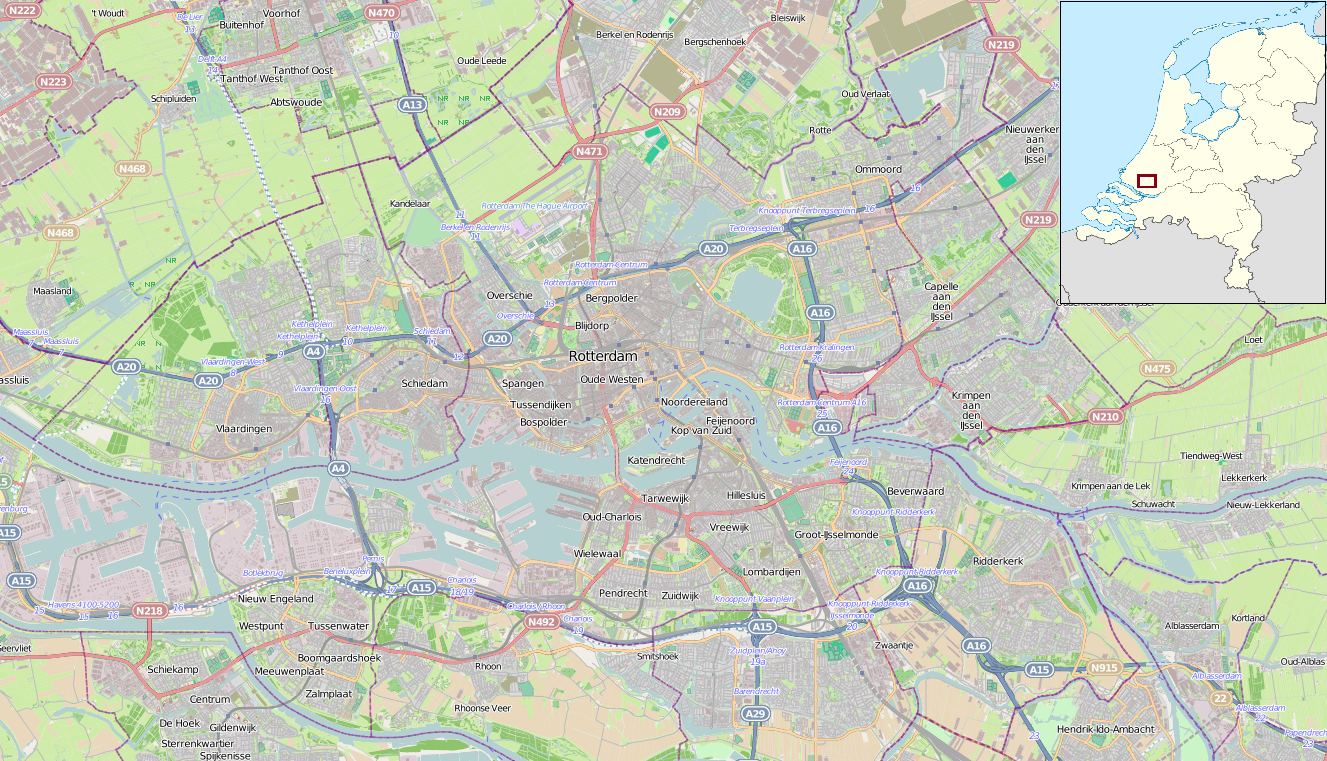
- Location within Rotterdam
- Alternative names: Kinepolis Cinerama

General information
- Status: cinema
- Type: Cinema
- Location: Westblaak 18, Rotterdam
- Coordinates: 51.917044°N 4.478859°E
- Opened: 1960
- Owner: Kinepolis Group

Other information
- Seating capacity: Screen 1: 291

Website
- cineramabios.nl

Cinerama is a cinema in central Rotterdam, the Netherlands. It started in 1960 and was rebuilt in the 1980s. It has seven screens and is owned by the Kinepolis Group.

The cinema screens both arthouse and mainstream films. It also hosts a variety of festival screenings such as Arab Cinema, IFFR and the Wildlife Film Festival.

== History ==
Cinerama was opened in July 1960, occupying the site of the former Scala cinema, which had gone bankrupt after just three years. It was named after the Cinerama projection system. The first film screened was This Is Cinerama (1952).

== Capacity ==
The current capacity for the seven screens are as follows:

- Screen 1 - 291
- Screen 2 - 123
- Screen 3 - 123
- Screen 4 - 88
- Screen 5 - 145
- Screen 6 - 145
- Screen 7 - 67

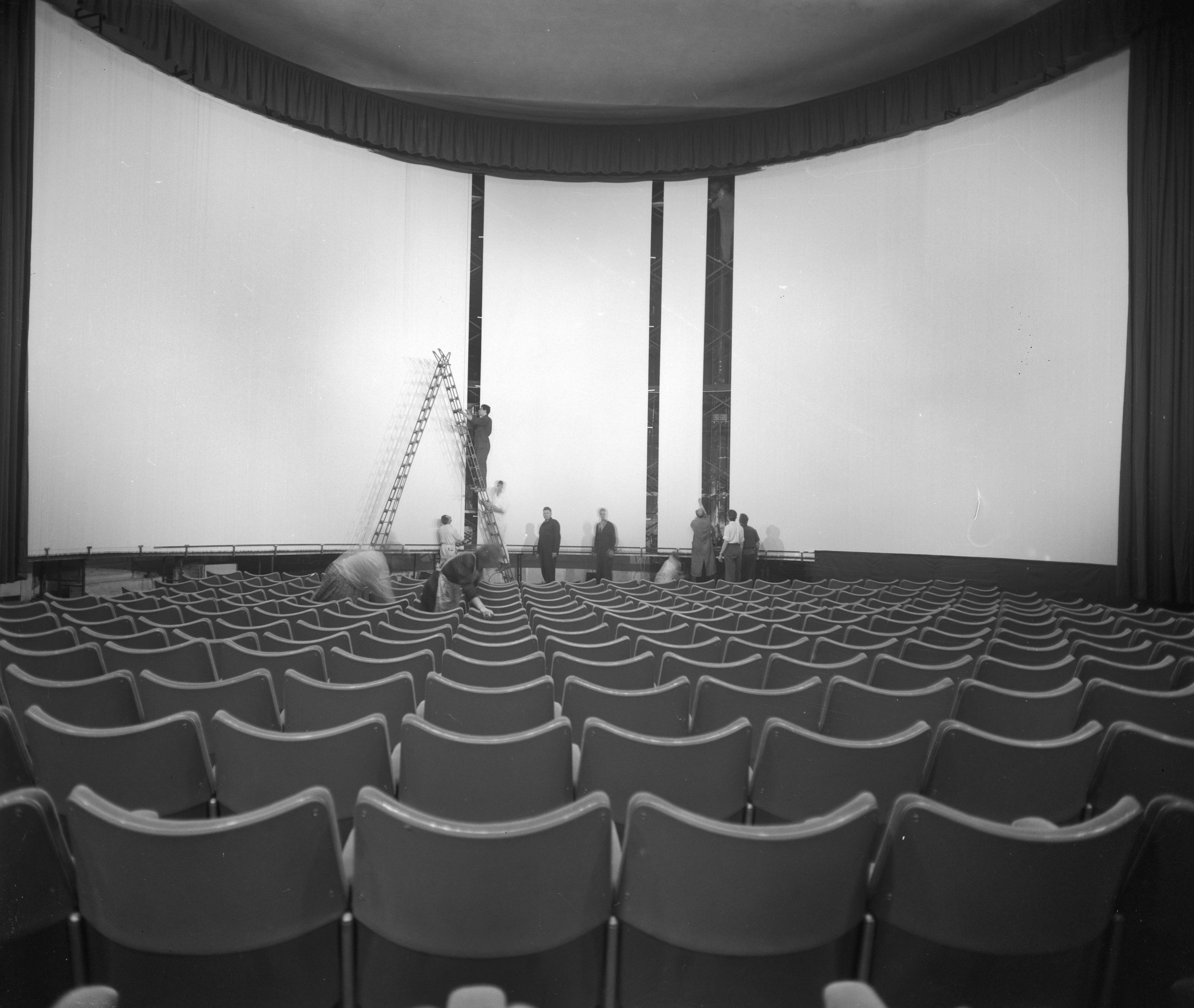
Cinerama's main screen in 1960
