= Gianmarco Donaggio =

Italian film director (born 1991)

- Born: August 4, 1991 (age 34); Italy
- Education: Lund University, Bournemouth Art University
- Notable work: In Visible Light, Azul no Azul

Gianmarco Donaggio (born 4 August 1991) is an Italian experimental film director and cinematographer.

== Career ==
In 2010–2020, Donaggio lived and worked between the UK and Norway. He debuted as a film director at the Pesaro Film Festival with the film Manifestarsi (2021), in the years following he produced the film performance In Visible Light (2023). He is a member of the European Film Academy, and a former Berlinale Talents.

He graduated in image philosophy at the University of Lund. His works are primarily non-narrative and are presented as a reflection on image and motion. His works have been presented in various European contemporary art museums, art biennials, and film festivals.

== Works ==
=== Live performed films ===
- In Visible Light (2023)
- Iconocrom (2023)

==== In Visible Light ====
In Visible Light' is a 2023 Italian experimental film, directed by Donaggio.

In Visible Light world premiered October 13, 2023 at the MIRAGE Film Festival in Oslo, it was shown twice in different formats.

The film is edited differently every time it is shown, making it a performance-film. It was presented as "a colorful audiovisual experience when the Italian filmmaker Gianmarco Donaggio performs his cinematic experience live, paying tribute to electricity and power."

=== Dance Films ===
Nymøn (2023)

=== Shorts ===
- Azul no Azul (2022)
- Manifestarsi (2021)
- Milano di Carta (2020)

=== Music videos ===
- Spøkelsesby - Hasse Farmen (2023)

== Writing ==
- 2021. Donaggio, Gianmarco "Cinematic Duration as Violence across Cinematography History and Samples" Cinematography in Progress.
- 2022. Donaggio, Gianmarco. "The dancing qualities of the cinematic space" Lund University. Dept. of Arts and Cultural Science.
