= La Luna (2023 film) =

2023 Singaporean-Malaysian film by M. Raihan Halim

- Theatrical release poster
- Directed by: M. Raihan Halim
- Written by: M. Raihan Halim
- Story by: M. Raihan Halim
- Produced by: Asra Aman; Faith Mak
- Starring: Shaheizy Sam; Sharifah Amani; Wan Hanafi Su; Hisyam Hamid; Nadiya Nissa; Nam Ron; Farah Ahmad; Iedil Dzuhrie Alaudin; Wafiy Ilhan; Syumaila Salihin
- Cinematography: Sofyan Daud Mohamed
- Edited by: Rohaidah Rashid
- Music by: Ken Hor; Aziem Rashidi
- Production companies: Clover Films; ACT 2 Pictures; One Cool Film Production; Papahan Films
- Distributed by: Skop Productions (Malaysia); Golden Village Pictures (Singapore)
- Release dates: 9 November 2023 (Malaysia); 16 November 2023 (Singapore); 6 December 2023 (Indonesia)
- Running time: 99 minutes
- Countries: Singapore; Malaysia
- Language: Malay
- Budget: S$1.1 million (RM3.5 million)

La Luna is a 2023 Malay-language romantic comedy-drama film written and directed by M. Raihan Halim. The film stars Shaheizy Sam and Sharifah Amani.

The film was released on 9 November 2023 in Malaysia, 16 November in Singapore and 6 December 2023 in Indonesia. It was selected as the Singaporean entry for the Best International Feature Film at the 97th Academy Awards, but was not nominated.

== Plot ==
Life in the fictional village of Kampong Bras Basah is dictated by the deeply religious and socially conservative views of chief Tok Hassan. However, businesswoman Hanie arrives in town and renovates her grandfather's old house into a lingerie shop named La Luna. The shop is for female customers only and is seen by Hanie as a safe space for the village's women.

Hanie becomes friends with the town's head policeman, Salihin, and his teenage daughter Azura, who begins working part-time at La Luna. Hanie also provides support to Yam, a villager who is being abused by her husband, Pa'at. Yam eventually leaves her husband to stay with Hanie, who rebuffs Pa'at and Hassan's attempts at reconciliation.

La Luna eventually becomes successful as it attracts customers from across the region, becoming popular with Bras Basah's women after an amorous husband and wife, whose sex life has been reignited by La Luna's lingerie, accidentally broadcasts their intercourse over the village mosque's loudspeakers, leading to an outraged Hassan to condemn the shop, seeing it as an example of external moral decay that will take over the village. He petitions the local government to shut down La Luna, but most villagers declined to sign it, seeing its presence as a general improvement in village life. Though Fauzi, the local ustad, is compelled to sign it by Hassan, he withdraws his name after witnessing Hassan bribing an official. Without an ustad's signature, Hassan's petition cannot move forward, and La Luna remains open.

While Hanie, Salihin and many of the villagers attend an outdoor film screening, an arsonist sets La Luna on fire with Azura still working inside. Salihin pulls her to safety, but La Luna is damaged in the fire. Suspicion falls on Pa'at after they discover that he had purchased cans of petrol, and later that night, he holds a defiant Yam at gunpoint, telling her she could no longer safe without La Luna. However, Pa'at is unwilling to shoot her, and Salihin disarms him.

The next day, Salihin confronts Hassan in the mosque, claiming that in the rubble of La Luna, he had found one of Hassan's pocket lighters, and while Pa'at did plan to burn down La Luna, it was Hassan who lit the fire, intending to false flag Pa'at. Hassan tells Salihin he was unaware Azura was inside, but still believe he would have knowingly started the blaze. He takes back the lighter, telling Salihin that this is the only evidence he has over him, unaware that his confession had been broadcast to the village over the mosque's loudspeakers. In front of the entire village, Hassan is arrested and taken away.

Hanie tells Salihin that she is leaving Kampong Bras Basah, but finds the entire village rebuilding La Luna and decides to stay. The shop sees continued success, and in prison, Hassan finds himself making lingerie for the brand. Life in the village continues, with the residents embracing a slightly more liberal lifestyle.

== Cast ==
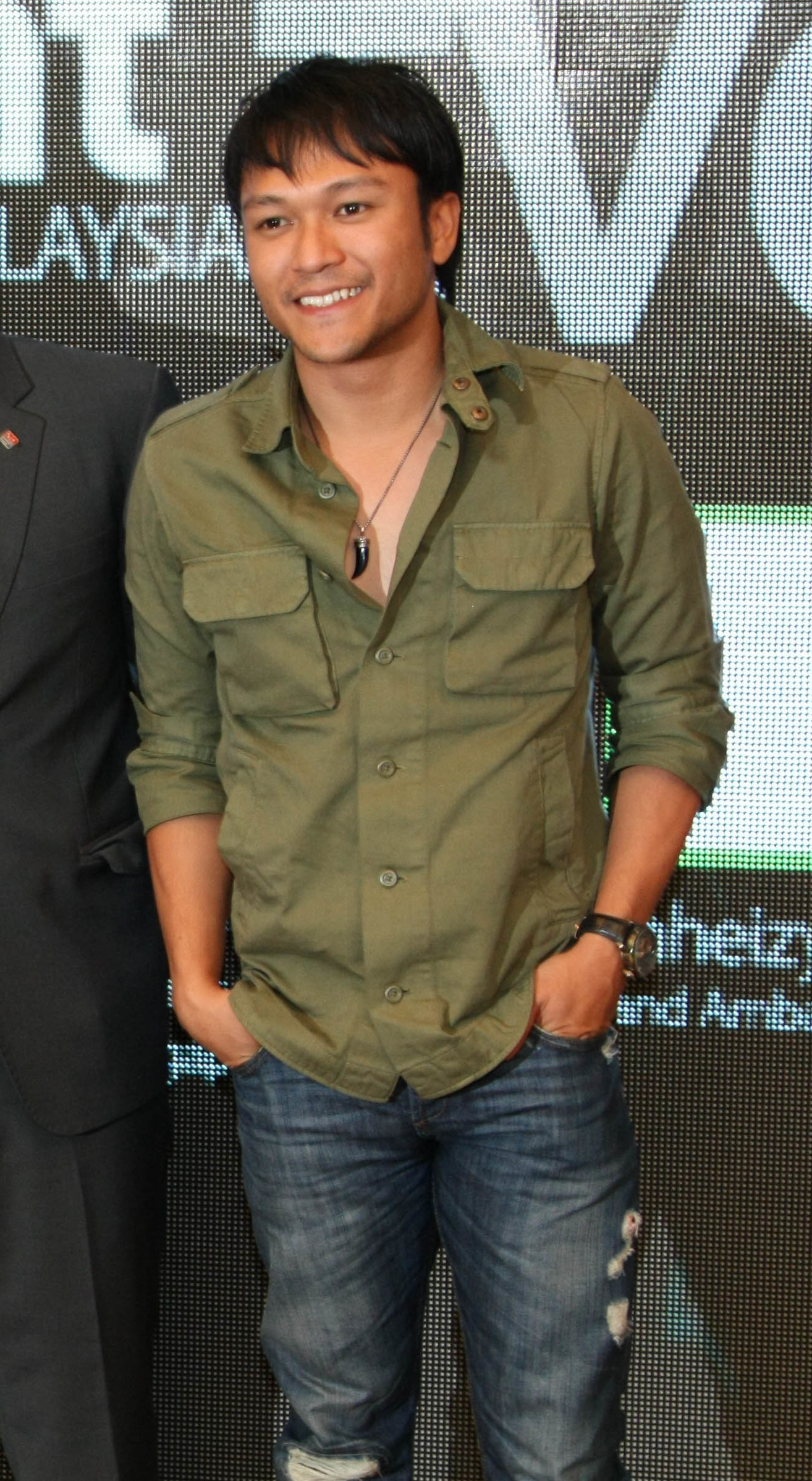
Shaheizy Sam
- Shaheizy Sam as Salihin Arshad
- Sharifah Amani as Hanie Abdullah
- Wan Hanafi Su as Tok Hassan
- Hisyam Hamid as Pa'at
- Nadiya Nissa as Yam
- Nam Ron as Ayob
- Farah Ahmad as Enah
- Iedil Dzuhrie Alaudin as Ustaz Fauzi
- Wafiy Ilhan as Yazid
- Syumaila Salihin as Azura Salihin
- Bella Rahim as Peah
- Elza Irdalynna as Jenab
- Nizam Hashim as Eunos

== Production ==
This film was produced by 4 companies: Clover Films and Papahan Films from Singapore, ACT 2 Pictures from Malaysia and One Cool Film from Hong Kong.

=== Development ===
Raihan Halim, the film director, wrote the story and screenplay himself. Raihan told Cinema Online,

"La Luna is a story that has been playing in my mind for almost a decade. It has the same theme as my first film, "Banting", in showcasing Malay Muslim stories with unexpected storylines. The story of a lingerie store that can change a society was funny at first... but then it became an attraction for me." "I'm incredibly lucky to have the opportunity to work with such great talents in the region, and I can't wait to introduce La Luna to the world."

He also told Malaysiakini that this film has its unique style, even though he admitted it is a bit naughty.

=== One Cool Film ===
Massive improvement within the Malaysian film industry attracted Hong Kong-based film company One Cool Film to invest in the film in collaboration with 3 other companies. Lim Teck of Clover Films was grateful for One Cool Film's support and gave feedback to the film.

One Cool Film began operation in Malaysia on 20 April with The Locksmith as its first feature filmed in the country and La Luna as its first Singapore-Malaysia co-production.

=== Filming ===
Principal photography took 22 days in Perak.

== Release ==
The film was released on 9 November 2023 with Skop Productions distributing for the Malaysian market, while Golden Village Pictures picked up distribution rights and released it on 16 November 2023 in Singapore. The film was also selected for the Tokyo International Film Festival, Jakarta Film Week, and Jogja-NETPAC Asian Film Festival in Indonesia.

== Reception ==
=== Critical response ===
The film received positive reviews from critics. Noel Wong, writing for Free Malaysia Today, wrote: "A good chunk of laughs are derived from the sexual repression of the villagers, thanks to Tok Hassan’s oppressive rules. Hanie’s arrival, therefore, brings a breath of fresh air to the village’s bedrooms."

== See also ==
- List of submissions to the 97th Academy Awards for Best International Feature Film
- List of Singaporean submissions for the Academy Award for Best International Feature Film
