= Cate Giordano =

American artist (born 1986)

- Born: 1986 (age 39–40); Pensacola, Florida, US
- Education: Massachusetts College of Art (BFA)
- Occupations: Installation artist; video artist
- Awards: Guggenheim Fellowship (2026)

Cate Giordano (born 1986) is an American artist working in video, sculpture, painting, and installation. In 2026, they were awarded a Guggenheim Fellowship in Film and Video.

== Biography ==
Giordano, a native of Pensacola, Florida, was born in 1986, and studied at the Massachusetts College of Art, where they obtained a BFA in 2008. They contributed an installation to the 2015 Spring/Break Art Show in New York City. They were a 2016 Smack Mellon studio artist.

Giordano appeared at the 2016 Spring/Break Art Show, where they created an installation involving "a full-scale diner, with fake food, actual booths, and fully dressed stick-figure patrons". Their piece TV Guide, which depicts a house interior, appeared at the 2017 Spring/Break Art Show; Rachel Miller of Brooklyn Magazine called it "more intense and crazier in a way only havoc can be" while Sarah Cascone of ArtNet said: "By drawing on [their] childhood memories, Giordano has created a deeply personal and instantly accessible work that calls out for exploration". They later returned to Spring/Break in 2018. That same year, their installation After the fire is gone premiered; composed of three sets themed after a diner, living room, and taxi, it features several television sets playing several parts of the titular film.

Giordano was a 2019-2020 Onassis AiR international resident artist. In December 2023, their multimedia installation Parts of the Brain, which depicts a pale-colored crocodile, appeared at Art Basel Miami Beach 2023; Alexander Morrison of The Art Newspaper called it "light stuff" due to what its gallery the Galerie Christophe Gaillard called its "psychological interpretation of animal and mythological figures as representations of human behavior". Two of their films, Hunter in the Woods (2007) and Species (2008), were part of Participant After Dark's 2025-2026 Cate Giordano, early movies exhibition.

Giordano performs multiple characters simultaneously within their own work. In December 2020, they had a solo exhibition at Postmasters Gallery, titled REX and inspired by Henry VIII's marriage to Anne of Cleves, in which Giordano dresses as both Anne and Henry VIII; Jillian Steinhauer of The New York Times called Giordano "magnetic and wickedly funny, particularly as the bumbling, vainglorious king".

Giordano lives and works in Brooklyn.
