= The Project of the Century =

- Poster
- Spanish: La obra del siglo
- Directed by: Carlos M. Quintela
- Written by: Abel Arcos, Carlos M. Quintela
- Produced by: Hernán Musaluppi, Natacha Cervi, Pablo Chernov
- Starring: Mario Balmaseda, Mario Guerra
- Cinematography: Marcos Attila
- Edited by: Yan Vega
- Music by: Vicente Rojas
- Production companies: Rizoma Films, Uranio Films LTD, Ventura Film, Raspberry & Cream
- Distributed by: Hubert Bals Fund
- Release date: 2015
- Running time: 100 minutes
- Countries: Argentina, Cuba, Switzerland, Germany
- Language: Spanish

The Project of the Century (Spanish: La obra del siglo) is a 2015 film directed by Carlos M. Quintela. The director's second feature film, it was screened at a number of international festivals, such as the Havana Film Festival, the Miami International Film Festival, and the International Film Festival Rotterdam, where it won the prestigious Tiger Award.

"The Project of the Century" alludes to the Juragua Nuclear Power Plant, a Soviet-Cuban project abandoned in 1992 following the collapse of the Soviet Union. The film, set in the workers’ town built next to the abandoned power plant, was shot in black-and-white. Quintela made use of archive footage from Cuban television.

The film was acquired by German sales company M-appeal.

== Synopsis ==
The film follows three generations of lonely Cuban men who struggle to co-exist under the same roof in a city once pledged to become the center of the Soviet nuclear project in the Caribbean.

== Reception ==
The film received positive reviews. Thomas Humprey for Cine Europa praised the film’s visual approach, particularly the contrast between the black-and-white cinematography and the archival documentary footage in color, stating that "Quintela has merged form with theme skilfully”. He also Sarah Skoric described the film as "an original experiment”, mentioning formal affinities to the cinema of Miguel Gomes and Roy Andersson, and concluding that Quintela showed "his daring and power as a filmmaker”. Berta Carricarte at IPS wrote that "its frank experimental character does not divorce it from its capacity to tell a story in the most sincere and clear way possible”.

== Cast ==
- Mario Balmaseda (as Otto)
- Mario Guerra (as Rafael)
- Leonardo Gascón (as Leo)
- Damarys Gutiérrez (as Marta)
- Manuel Porto
- Jorge Molina

== Awards and accolades ==
- 2015 – Hivos Tiger Award – International Film Festival Rotterdam.
- 2015 – Lions Film Award – International Film Festival Rotterdam.
- 2015 – FIPRESCI Award – Cinélatino – Rencontres de Toulouse.
- 2015 – Special Jury Prize and International Critics' Award (ex aequo) – Lima Latin American Film Festival.
- 2015 – Special Mention – New Horizons International Film Festival, Wrocław.
- 2015 – Special Mention – Ljubljana International Film Festival.
- 2015 – Jury Mention and Premio El Mégano – International Film Festival of New Latin American Cinema, Havana.
- 2015 – Best Eco Film – Esperanza International Film Festival.
- 2015 – Special Jury Award for Artistic Daring and Silver Award – Minsk International Film Festival.
- 2015 – Best Editing (Yan Vega) and Best Music (Vicente Rojas) – Cine Ceará Film Festival.

== Bibliography ==
- Fadell, Nicole. "The Cuban Nuclear Dream: The Afterlives of the Project of the Century." In The Social and Political Life of Latin American Infrastructures, chapter 10. University of London Press.
- Loss, Jacqueline. "Contesting the Cuban-Soviet Visual Rhetoric for the Present." In The Oxford Handbook of Communist Visual Cultures. Oxford University Press, pp. 649–671. https://doi.org/10.1093/oxfordhb/9780190885533.013.29
