= Carlos M. Quintela =

Cuban filmmaker

Carlos M. Quintela (born 1984) is a Cuban filmmaker and screenwriter.

== Career ==
Quintela was born in Havana, Cuba. He studied mass media at the Instituto Superior de Arte and screenwriting at the Escuela Internacional de Cine y Televisión in San Antonio de los Baños.

His debut feature La piscina (The Swimming Pool) premiered at the Berlinale and was screened at more than 20 film festivals. His second feature film, La obra del siglo (The Project of the Century), was also screened internationally, such as the Miami International Film Festival and the International Film Festival Rotterdam, where it won the prestigious Tiger Award. His next feature film was Los lobos del este filmed in Japan with Tatsuya Fuji in the leading role.

== Partial filmography ==
=== As director ===
- 2006: Cuidad sobre ruedas
- 2007: Stand By
- 2008: Contenedores
- 2011: La piscina (The Swimming Pool)
- 2015: La obra del siglo (The Project of the Century)
- 2017: Los Lobos del Este
- 2022: The Russian Playground

== Awards and nominations ==
- 2012 – Coral Award for Best Unpublished Screenplay for Ismael at the 34th International Festival of New Latin American Cinema in Havana.
- 2013 – World Cinema Amsterdam Jury Award for La piscina at World Cinema Amsterdam.
- 2015 – Tiger Award for The Project of the Century at the International Film Festival Rotterdam.
- 2015 – FIPRESCI Prize for La obra del siglo at Cinélatino, Rencontres de Toulouse.
- 2015 – Best Editing and Best Music awards for La obra del siglo at the 25th Cine Ceará – Ibero-American Film Festival.
