= International Film Festival Rotterdam =

Annual film festival in the Netherlands

Coordinates: 51.92°N 4.48°E

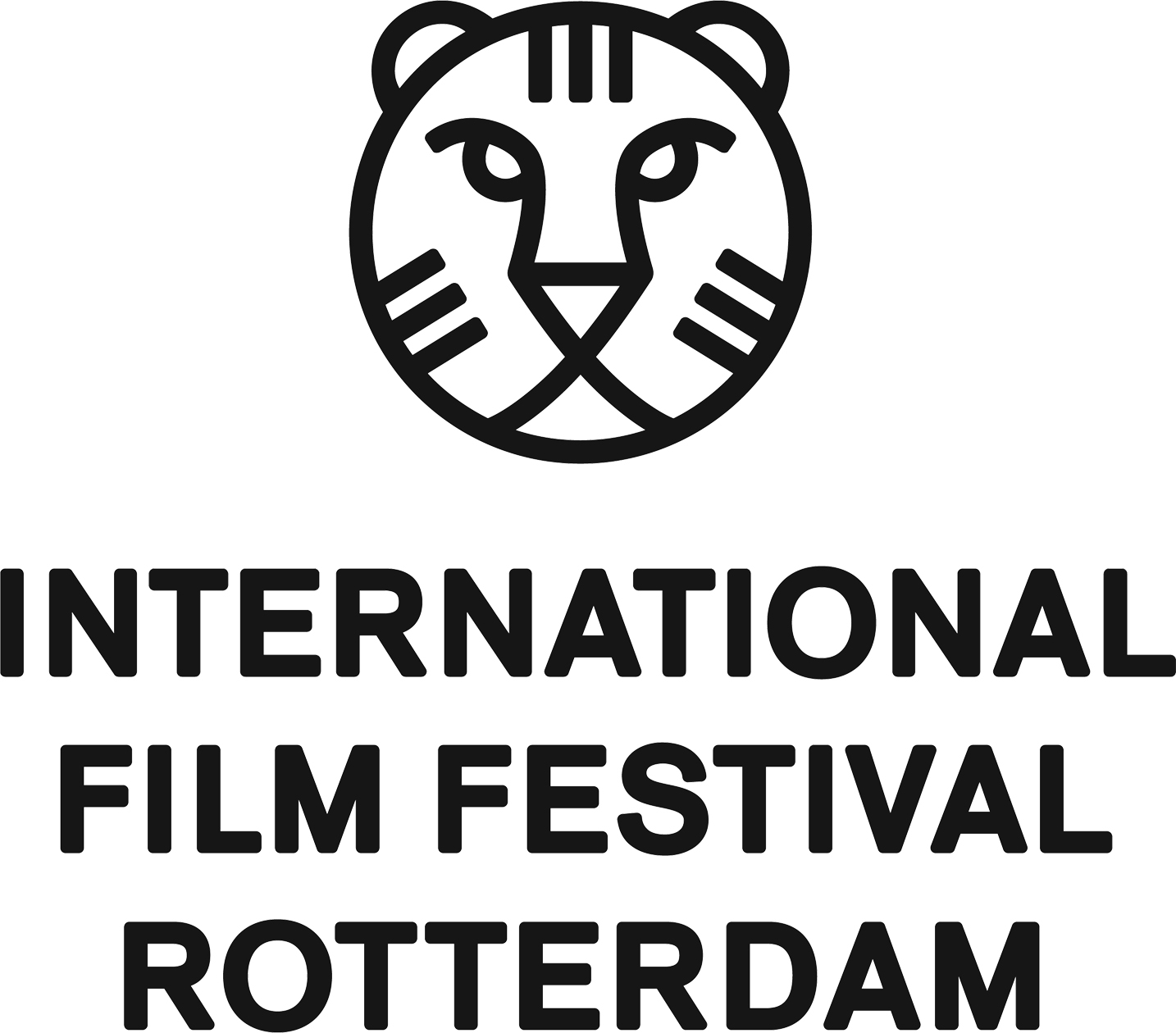
- IFFR logo
- Location: Rotterdam, Netherlands
- Founded: June 1972; 54 years ago
- Founded by: Huub Bals
- Most recent: 2026
- Awards: Tiger Award
- Artistic director: Vanja Kaludjercic
- Website: www.iffr.com

Current: 55th
- 56th 54th

International Film Festival Rotterdam (IFFR) is an annual film festival held at the end of January in various locations in Rotterdam, the Netherlands, focused on independent and experimental films. The inaugural festival took place in June 1972, led by founder Huub Bals. IFFR also hosts CineMart and BoostNL for film producers to seek funding.

== History ==
The first festival, then called Film International, was organized in June 1972 under the leadership of Huub Bals. The festival profiled itself as a promoter of alternative, innovative, and non-commercial films, with an emphasis on the Far East and developing countries. Around 1983, the festival founded CineMart to serve as a "regular film market", and later modified the business model to serve instead as a "co-production market", which helps a selected number of film producers connect with possible co-producers and funders for their film projects.

After the festival founder's sudden death in 1988, a fund was initiated and named after him (Hubert Bals Fund), used for supporting filmmakers from developing countries.

The non-competitive character of the festival changed in 1995, when the VPRO Tiger Awards were introduced—three yearly prizes for young filmmakers making their first or second film.

=== Directors ===
In 1996 Simon Field, formerly cinema director at the London Institute of Contemporary Arts, became director of the festival. In 2004 Sandra den Hamer took over as director of the festival, and from 2007 to 2015 the director was Rutger Wolfson. Film producer Bero Beyer was the next director.

In 2020, Vanja Kaludjercic was appointed as the new director.

== Description ==
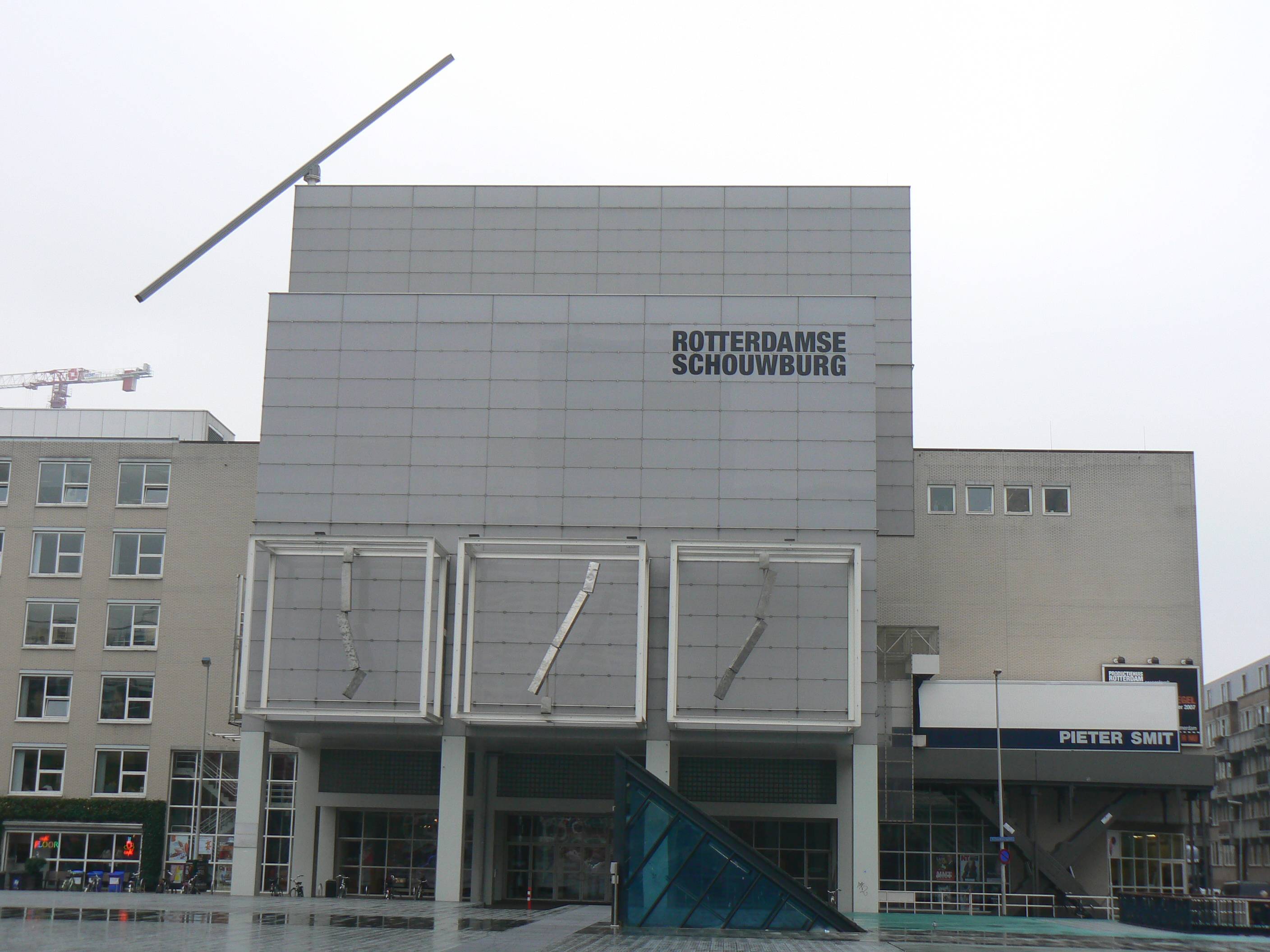
Rotterdamse Schouwburg

Since its foundation in 1972, it has maintained a focus on independent and experimental filmmaking by showcasing emerging talents and established auteurs. The festival also places a focus on presenting cutting edge media art and arthouse film, with most of the participants in the short film program identified as artists or experimental filmmakers. IFFR also hosts CineMart and BoostNL, for film producers to seek funding.

As of 2024, Vanja Kaludjercic is director of the festival.

The IFFR logo is a stylized image of a tiger that is loosely based on Leo, the lion in the MGM logo.

== Festival screening locations ==
The IFFR screens films at multiple locations, including the Pathé cinema at Schouwburgplein, De Doelen, Cinerama, WORM, Oude Luxor Theater, Rotterdamse Schouwburg, KINO, and LantarenVenster.

== Tiger Award winners ==
The Tiger Award has had various sponsors over the years. In the years leading up to and including 2010, it was sponsored by the VPRO. In 2011, the award was presented by the Prins Bernhard Cultuurfonds and since 2012 by Hivos.

| Year | Film | Original title | Director | Country |
|---|---|---|---|---|
| 1995 | Postman | Youchai | Jianjun He | China |
| 1995 | How Old Is the River? | Fuyu no kappa | Kazama Shiori | Japan |
| 1995 | Thalassa, Thalassa, Ruckkehr Zum Mmer | Thalassa, Thalassa | Bogdan Dumitrescu | Germany; Romania |
| 1996 | Sons | Erzi | Zhang Yuan | China |
| 1996 | Like Grains of Sand | Nagisa no Shindobaddo | Ryōsuke Hashiguchi | Japan |
| 1996 | Small Faces | | Gillies MacKinnon | United Kingdom |
| 1997 | Last Holiday | Posledniye kanikuly | Amir Karakulov | Kazakhstan |
| 1997 | The Day a Pig Fell into the Well | Daijiga umule pajinnal | Hong Sang-soo | South Korea |
| 1997 | Robinson in Space | | Patrick Keiller | United Kingdom |
| 1998 | Buttoners | Knoflíkári | Petr Zelenka | Czech Republic |
| 1998 | Round the Moons Between Earth and Sea | Giro di lune tra terra e mare | Giuseppe Gaudino | Italy |
| 1998 | The Inheritors | Die Siebtelbauern | Stefan Ruzowitzky | Austria |
| 1999 | The Iron Heel of Oligarchy | Zheleznaya pyata oligarkhii | Alexander Bashirov | Russia |
| 1999 | More Than Yesterday | Plus qu'hier moins que demain | Laurent Achard | France |
| 1999 | Following | | Christopher Nolan | United Kingdom |
| 2000 | Suzhou River | Suzhou he | Ye Lou | China |
| 2000 | Crane World | Mundo Grúa | Pablo Trapero | Argentina |
| 2000 | Bye Bye Blue Bird | | Katrin Ottarsdottír | Denmark |
| 2001 | Bad Company | Mabudachi | Furumaya Tomoyuki | Japan |
| 2001 | The Days Between | In den Tag hinein | Maria Speth | Germany |
| 2001 | 25 Watts | | Juan Pablo Rebella & Pablo Stoll | Uruguay |
| 2002 | Sleeping Rough | Tussenland | Eugenie Jansen | Netherlands |
| 2002 | Everyday God Kisses Us on the Mouth | În fiecare zi Dumnezeu ne saruta pe gura | Sinişa Dragin | Romania |
| 2002 | Wild Bees | Divoké vcely | Bohdan Sláma | Czech Republic |
| 2003 | With Love. Lilya | S lyubovyu. Lilya | Larisa Sadilova | Russia |
| 2003 | Strange | Extraño | Santiago Loza | Argentina |
| 2003 | Jealousy Is My Middle Name | Jiltuneun naui him | Park Chan-ok | South Korea |
| 2004 | The Missing | Bu jian | Kang-sheng Lee | Taiwan |
| 2004 | Summer in the Golden Valley | Ljeto u zlatnoj dolini | Srđan Vuletić | Bosnia-Herzegovina |
| 2004 | En Route | Unterwegs | Jan Krüger | Germany |
| 2005 | Changing Destiny | Nemmeno il destino | Daniele Gaglianone | Italy |
| 2005 | 4 | Chetyre | Ilya Khrzhanovsky | Russia |
| 2005 | The Sky Turns | El cielo gira | Mercedes Álvarez | Spain |
| 2006 | Walking on the Wild Side | Lai xiao zi | Han Jie | China |
| 2006 | The Dog Pound | La perrera | Manuel Nieto Zas | Uruguay; Argentina; Canada; Spain |
| 2006 | Old Joy | | Kelly Reichardt | United States |
| 2007 | Love Conquers All | | Tan Chui Mui | Malaysia |
| 2007 | The Unpolished | Die Unerzogenen | Pia Marais | Germany |
| 2007 | Bog of Beasts | Baixio das Bestas | Claudio Assis | Brazil |
| 2007 | AFR | | Morten Hartz Kaplers | Denmark |
| 2008 | Go With Peace Jamil | Gå med fred Jamil - Ma salama Jamil | Omar Shargawi | Denmark |
| 2008 | Wonderful Town | (เมืองเหงาซ่อนรัก) | Aditya Assarat | Thailand |
| 2008 | Flower in the Pocket | | Liew Seng Tat | Malaysia |
| 2009 | Be Calm and Count to Seven | Aram bash va ta hatf beshmar | Ramtin Lavafipour | Iran |
| 2009 | Breathless | Ddongpari | Yang Ik-june | South Korea |
| 2009 | Wrong Rosary | Uzak ihtimal | Mahmut Fazil Coskun | Turkey |
| 2010 | Cold Water of the Sea | Agua fría de mar | Paz Fábrega | Costa Rica |
| 2010 | Alamar | To the Sea | Pedro González-Rubio | Mexico |
| 2010 | Mundane History | Jao nok krajok (เจ้านกกระจอก) | Anocha Suwichakornpong | Thailand |
| 2011 | The Journals of Musan | Musanilgi | Park Jung-bum | South Korea |
| 2011 | Finisterrae | | Sergio Caballero | Spain |
| 2011 | Eternity | Tee rak (ที่รัก) | Sivaroj Kongsakul | Thailand |
| 2012 | Klip | Clip | Maja Miloš | Serbia |
| 2012 | Thursday Till Sunday | De jueves a domingo | Dominga Sotomayor Castillo | Chile; Netherlands |
| 2012 | Egg and Stone | Jidan he shitou | Ji Huang | China |
| 2013 | My Dog Killer | Môj pes Killer | Mira Fornay | Slovakia; Czech Republic |
| 2013 | Soldier Jane | Soldate Jeannette | Daniel Hoesl | Austria |
| 2013 | Fat Shaker | Larzanandeye charbi | Mohammad Shirvani | Iran |
| 2014 | Anatomy of a Paper Clip | Yamamori clip koujo no atari | Ikeda Akira | Japan |
| 2014 | Something Must Break | Nånting måste gå sönder | Ester Martin Bergsmark | Sweden |
| 2014 | Han Gong-ju | Han Gong-ju | Lee Su-jin | South Korea |
| 2015 | The Project of the Century | La obra del siglo | Carlos M. Quintela | Argentina; Cuba; Switzerland |
| 2015 | Videophilia (and Other Viral Syndromes) | Videofilia: y otros síndromes virales | Juan Daniel F. Molero | Peru |
| 2015 | Vanishing Point | | Jakrawal Nilthamrong | Thailand; Netherlands |
| 2016 | Radio Dreams | | Babak Jalali | Iran; United States |
| 2017 | Sexy Durga | | Sanal Kumar Sasidharan | India |
| 2018 | The Widowed Witch | Xiao gua fu cheng xian ji | Cai Chengjie | China |
| 2019 | Present.Perfect. | Wan mei jin xing shi | Shengze Zhu | Hong Kong; USA |
| 2020 | The Cloud In Her Room | Ta fang jian li de yun | Zheng Lu Xinyuan | China; Hong Kong |
| 2021 | Pebbles | Koozhaangal | Vinothraj P.S. | India |
| 2022 | EAMI | | Paz Encina | Paraguay |
| 2023 | Le spectre de Boko Haram | | Cyrielle Raingou | Cameroon |
| 2024 | Rei | | Tanaka Toshihiko | Japan |
| 2025 | Fiume o morte! | | Igor Bezinović | Croatia, Italy, Slovenia |
| 2026 | Variations on a Theme! | | Jason Jacobs and Devon Delmar | South Africa, Netherlands, Qatar |

== Tiger Short Award Winners ==
The short films have their own competition at IFFR. What differentiates it from the Tiger Competition for feature-length films is the fact that it's not just for young and upcoming talents; all filmmakers have a chance at winning. Since 2005, The Tiger Short Competition has had various sponsors over the years including Ammodo, an institution in the Netherlands that supports the development of arts, architecture and science. In 2023, 24 shorts competed for three equal Tiger Short Awards, each worth €5,000.

| Year | Film | Original title | Directors | Country |
|---|---|---|---|---|
| 2025 | A Metamorphosis | အသွင်ပြောင်းလဲမှုတစ်ခု | Lin Htet Aung | Myanmar |
| 2025 | Temo Re | თემო რე | Anka Gujabidze | Georgia |
| 2025 | Merging Bodies | | Adrian Paci | Italy |
| 2024 | Crazy Lotus | | Naween Noppakun, | Thailand |
| 2024 | Few Can See | | Frank Sweeney | Ireland |
| 2024 | Workers' Wings | | Ilir Hasanaj | Kosovo |
| 2023 | Human Nature | Natureza Humana | Mónica Lima | Portugal Germany |
| 2023 | Tito | Tito | Kervens Jimenez & Taylor McIntosh | Haiti |
| 2023 | What the Soil Remembers | What the Soil Remembers | José Cardoso | South Africa Ecuador |
| 2022 | Becoming Male in the Middle Ages | Tornar-se Homem na Idade Média | Pedro Neves Marques | Portugal |
| 2022 | Nazarbazi | Nazarbazi | Maryam Tafakory | Iran |
| 2022 | Nosferasta: First Bite | Nosferasta: First Bite | Bayley Sweitzer & Adam Khalil | USA |
| 2021 | Maat | Maat | Foxy Maxy | USA |
| 2021 | Sunsets, everyday | Sunsets, everyday | Basir Mahmood | Italy |
| 2021 | Terranova | Terranova | Alejandro Pérez Serrano & Alejandro Alonso Estrella | Cuba |
| 2020 | Apparition | Apparition | Ismaïl Bahri | France |
| 2020 | Communicating Vessels | Communicating Vessels | Maïder Fortuné & Annie MacDonell | Canada |
| 2020 | Sun Dog | Sun Dog | Dorian Jespers | Belgium Russia |
| 2019 | Wong Ping's Fables 1 | Wong Ping's Fables 1 | Wong Ping | Hong Kong |
| 2019 | Ultramarine | Ultramarine | Vincent Meessen | Belgium France Canada |
| 2019 | Freedom of Movement | Freedom of Movement | Nina Fischer & Maroan el Sani | Germany Italy |
| 2018 | Mountain Plain Mountain | Mountain Plain Mountain | Araki Yu & Daniel Jacoby | Italy |
| 2018 | Rose Gold | Rose Gold | Sara Cwynar | USA |
| 2018 | With History in a Room Filled with People with Funny Names 4 | With History in a Room Filled with People with Funny Names 4 | Korakrit Arunanondchai | USA |

== Special Jury Award ==
| Year | Film | Original title | Director | Country |
|---|---|---|---|---|
| 2021 | Pebbles | | PS Vinothraj | India |
| 2021 | I Comete: A Corsican Summer | | Pascal Tagnati | Corsica |
| 2021 | Looking for Venera | | Norika Sefa | Kosovo |
| 2022 | Excess Will Save Us | | Morgane Dziurla-Petit | France |
| 2022 | To Love Again | | Gao Linyang | China |
| 2023 | Munnel | மணல் | Visakesa Chandrasekaram | Sri Lanka |
| 2023 | New Strains | | Artemis Shaw, Prashanth Kamalakanthan | United States |
| 2024 | Kiss Wagon | | Midhun Murali | India |
| 2024 | Flathead | | Jaydon Martin | Australia |
| 2025 | L'arbre de l'authenticité | | Sammy Baloji | Congo |
| 2025 | Im Haus meiner Eltern | | Tim Ellrich | Germany |

== Audience Award ==
| Year | Film | Original title | Director | Country |
|---|---|---|---|---|
| 2021 | Quo Vadis, Aida? | | Jasmila Žbanić | Bosnia |
| 2022 | Freaks Out | | Gabriele Mainetti | Italy |
| 2023 | Love According to Dalva | | Emmanuelle Nicot | France |
| 2024 | Green Border | | Agnieszka Holland | Poland |
| 2025 | I'm Still Here | Ainda Estou Aqui | Walter Salles | Brazil, France |
| 2026 | I Swear | | Kirk Jones | United Kingdom |

== Robby Müller Award ==
This award given since 2020, is a collaborative award between IFFR, the Netherlands Society of Cinematographers and Andrea Müller-Schirmer, Robby Müller's wife.

- 2020 – Diego García, Cinematographer, Mexico
- 2021 – Kelly Reichardt, American film director and screenwriter.
- 2022 – Sayombhu Mukdeeprom, Thai cinematographer.
- 2023 – Hélène Louvart, French cinematographer
- 2024 – Grimm Vandekerckhove, Belgian cinematographer
- 2025 – Lol Crawley, English cinematographer
- 2026 – Yorick Le Saux, French cinematographer

== See also ==
- 75B, Netherlands design studio
