= Kathleen Weaver =

American writer and editor (born 1945)

Kathleen Weaver (born 1945) is an American writer and editor, who was born in Sioux City, Iowa.

== Education ==
Raised in Polo, Illinois, she went on to study art and political science at the University of Edinburgh. After, she earned a B.A. and M.A. in Comparative Literature from the University of California Berkeley (UCB) as a Ford Career Fellow. While a graduate student, she received an Emily Chamberlain Cook Prize in poetry. As part of the women's studies movement in UCB's Comparative Literature Department she co-edited one of the first anthologies of international women's literature: The Other Voice, Twentieth Century Women's Poetry in Translation, following which she co-edited The Penguin Book of Women Poets.

== Career ==
While a student in Berkeley she met documentary film director Allan Francovich whom she married in 1970; together they participated in the F.W. Murnau film society, the cinematic rediscovery circle around Tom Luddy, founder of the Pacific Film Archives. She co-edited three editions of the national reference Film Programmer’s Guide to 16mm Rentals, which received grants from the Academy of Motion Pictures Arts and Sciences, the NEA, and the California Arts Council.

She collaborated on a number of Francovich's films, including the award-winning and controversial On Company Business, A Documentary History of the CIA, 1980, directed by Francovich, co-produced by Howard Dratch. The couple's travels to Cuba and Central America led to her translation of a number of works from Spanish, including Fire from the Mountain: The Making of a Sandinista by Omar Cabezas, and Julio Cortázar’s Nicaraguan Sketches, as well as the first book-length translation into English of Cuban poet Nancy Morejón. Her poetry translations, especially of Cuban poets (Nancy Morejón, Fayad Jamís, Cintio Vitier, Eliseo Diego, Fina García Marruz, Samuel Feijóo, Roberto Fernández Retamar) have appeared in reviews and textbooks. Her own poems have also appeared in reviews.

Following the dissolution of her marriage to Francovich in 1986, she became associated with and later married painter, poster and printmaker, KPFA Radio public events producer, and co-founder of Black Oak Books, Bob Baldock— one of only two North Americans who went from the mainland in March 1958 to join Fidel Castro's own 26th of July Group as a combatant in the Sierra Maestra of Cuba. With his help she wrote the first English-language biography of Peruvian feminist, poet, and progressive activist Magda Portal. Weaver has worked as guest faculty at the San Francisco Art Institute and for a number of years as a member of the adjunct faculty in English at Berkeley City College. She lives with her husband in Berkeley, California.

== Bibliography ==
- Peruvian Rebel, The World of Magda Portal, With a Selection of Her Poems. University Park: Penn State University Press, 2009.
- The Penguin Book of Women Poets, co-edited with Carol Cosman and Joan Keefe: London: Penguin, 1978.
- The Other Voice, Twentieth Century Women’s Poetry in Translation, co-edited with Joanna Bankier, Carol Cosman, Doris Earnshaw, Joan Keefe, Deirdre Lashgari, Foreword by Adrienne Rich, New York: W. W. Norton, 1976.
- ¡Chile, Sí! Poems of Solidarity, co-edited with Bob High and Michael Taylor, Berkeley: Non-Intervention in Chile, 1975.
- Film Programmer’s Guide to 16mm Rentals, Berkeley: Reel Research, co-edited with Linda Artel, 1975; 1978; co-edited with Richard Prelinger, 1980.

Books translated from Spanish

- Poems by Eliseo Diego, translated with Eliseo Diego. New York: Center for Cuban Studies, 1984
- Where the Island Sleeps Like a Wing, Selected Poetry of Nancy Morejón, intro. by K.Weaver, San Francisco: Black Scholar Press, 1985.
- Fire from the Mountain: The Making of a Sandinista, Omar Cabezas, intro. by Carlos Fuentes, New York: Crown Publishers, 1985.
- Nicaraguan Sketches, Julio Cortázar, intro. by K. Weaver, New York: W.W. Norton & Co., Inc., 1989.
