= P.M. affair =

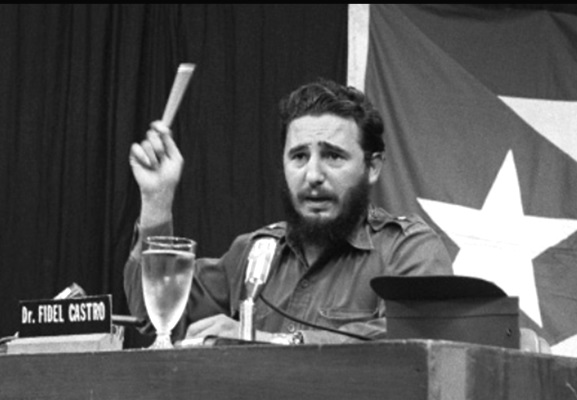
Fidel Castro delivering his "Words to the Intellectuals" speech, given in response to the P.M. affair.

The P.M. affair was a political scandal that occurred in Cuba in 1961. After a brief period of artistic optimism beginning in 1959, where exiled artists returned to Cuba, the banning of the film p.M. triggered a slow wave of emigration of Cuban filmmakers, who grew more frustrated with growing censorship in Cuba. The banning of the film p.M. was not a lone act of censorship which caused pessimism among filmmakers, instead, the censorship of P.M. was viewed to exemplify a growing atmosphere of artistic overwatch.

In the aftermath of the film's censorship, Castro gave his famous Words to the Intellectuals speech, outlining his cultural policy that forbids expression of ideas critical of "the revolution".

== Background ==
=== Cuban media and censorship ===
After the success of the Cuban Revolution in 1959, there was a brief literary boom in Cuba. The magazine Lunes de Revolución was developed to be a weekly version of the magazine Revolución. The magazine was edited by Guillermo Cabrera Infante, and worked to promote Cuban culture to a worldwide audience. The Casa de las Américas also began to publish its own literary review.

Lunes de Revolución was loosely organized by Carlos Franqui, Virgilio Piñera, Pablo Armando Fernández, Jose Antonio Baragaño, Antón Arrufat, Oscar Hurtado, and Humberto Arenal. The magazine took no common political stance, and often published works about surrealism, or existentialism. By 1960, a general trend develop to publish works that were "revolutionary" in that they supported Cuba's political direction.

At the beginning of 1960, the Cuban press began to face greater censorship struggles. Newspapers were demanded to add "coletillas" (tag-lines), after articles that the print union disapproved. By the end of 1960, the conflict over coletillas would lead print unions to seize newspaper plants, and allow them to be nationalized.

The film p.M. was shot in 1960 by Orlando Jiménez Leal and Alberto Cabrera Infante, and was an homage to the style of Free Cinema. The film portrayed the black and mulatto poor of Havana engaging in a night of partying. p.M. stands for post meridiem.

=== Anti-racism in Cuba ===
In March 1969, Castro declared in a speech, a promise to desegregate private beaches. The declaration was a major policy shift for Castro, who until that point had spoken little of racism in Cuba, and had made no racially-minded policy changes. Outside of policy promises, Castro also promised in the speech to regularly denounce racists as a method of mass consciousness changing.

By 1961, there was a growing sentiment in Cuba that anti-racist consciousness changing was no longer necessary, and that discussions of race were now superfluous.

== Controversy ==
Alfredo Guevara, who was head of the Instituto Cubano del Arte e Industria Cinematográficos, refused to give a license to the film which approved it for public screening, even though it had been aired on television. This refusal for public screening was made, according to Guevara, because the film "obviously wasn't made out of any feeling of racial discrimination, but a number of people found it offensive". This stirred a controversy among the writers at Lunes de Revolución, and member Néstor Almendros published the controversy in Revista Bohemia. The Casa de las Américas responded to the controversy by having a private viewing of the film, which resulted in mixed reviews. The debates that followed caused the intervention of Fidel Castro, who met with the contesting writers and delivered his famed "Words to the Intellectuals" speech.

In his 1961, speech "Word to the Intellectuals", Castro stated:

This means that within the Revolution, everything goes; against the Revolution, nothing. Nothing against the Revolution, because the Revolution has its rights also, and the first right of the Revolution is the right to exist, and no one can stand against the right of the Revolution to be and to exist, No one can rightfully claim a right against the Revolution. Since it takes in the interests of the people and Signifies the interests of the entire nation.

While Castro's proclamation was vague in defining to who was considered loyal to "the revolution", Castro also later defined in his speech, a need for the National Cultural Council to direct artistic affairs in Cuba, and for the National Union of Writers and Artists of Cuba to publish literary debate magazines.

== Aftermath ==
Castro's speech "Words to the Intellectuals" was the first instance of any sort of boundaries established for artistic expression, after the Cuban Revolution. Much of the artistic oversight that developed after the P.M. affair, often policed artistic representations of black people, which were considered too ethnically specific, and without a general Cuban character.

Soon after Castro's proclamation, the government shut down Lunes de Revolución, and a few months later established the National Union of Writers and Artists of Cuba.

The precedent of censorship established by the P.M. affair, eventually culminated in the Padilla affair of 1971, a similar scandal of artistic censorship.
