= Marilyn Bobes =

Cuban poet, novelist, literary critic and editor

Marilyn Bobes León (born María de los Ángeles Bobes León; 1955 in Havana, Cuba) is a Cuban poet, novelist, literary critic and editor.

Bobes began her studies at University of Havana in 1974 and earned a bachelor's degree in History in 1978. She continued her professional life as a journalist working for major news outlets such as Prensa Latina and the magazine Revolución y Cultura. She made her debut in the field of poetry when her collection of poems La aguja en el pajar (published in 1979) won the David Literary Award for Poetry in 1979.

Later, in 1996, her collection of short stories, Alguien tiene que llorar (published in 1995) won the award Casa de las Américas. This same year, Bobes published Estatuas de sal with Mirta Yáñez, a Cuban philologist, teacher and writer. Estatuas de sal was the first collection of fiction of Cuban female writers.

She won the award Premio Latinoamericano de Cuento Edmundo Valdés in Mexico in 1993 and Premio de Cuento Hispanoamericano Femenino Magda Portal in Peru in 1994 for her poem "Alguien tiene que llorar."

In 2005, she received the award Premio Casa de las Américas de Novela for her novel Fiebre de invierno, and in 2016 the award Julio Cortázar for her story "A quien pueda interesar."

Furthermore, between 1993 and 1997 she served as vice president of the Unión de Escritores y Artistas de Cuba (National Union of Writers and Artists of Cuba, UNEAC). In an interview she mentions she left UNEAC because she believed she could make a change in the world more effectively through her writing.

She was married for six years to the writer Jean Portante from Luxembourg. They met at a poetry festival in Macedonia.

== Early life and education ==
Marilyn Bobes began writing her first poems when she was about twelve or thirteen years old. In an interview she remembers that when one of her school friends from Chile introduced her to famous artists such as César Vallejo, Juan Gelman and Roque Dalton, she realized she wanted to pursue writing. During this time (around 1970) she was also influenced by music that was coming out in Cuba by Silvio Rodríguez, Pablo Milanés and Catalan singer and songwriter Joan Manuel Serrat. During her teenage years, her mother showed Bobes' poems to the now deceased poet Roberto Branly (her neighbor's friend). He advised Bobes to attend literary workshops at the Brigada Hermanos Sainz, an organization that unites young Cuban writers and artists. In these workshops she received substantial criticism for her work, since, unlike that of her peers, her poetry was not about the socialist reality in Cuba, but about sexual liberty, Catholic dogmas and the breaking of tradition.

She attended the University of Havana in 1974 and received a bachelor's degree in History in 1978. Throughout her studies, she continued writing poetry on her own, as she feared that her writing was not going to be accepted by her peers. She would only share her writing to a small group of friends who also shared an interest in reading and writing about non-traditional themes. Among these, poet Andrés Reynaldo.

Her first collection of poems, Alguien que está escribiendo su ternura, won an honorary mention in the "13 de marzo" poetry competition at University of Havana in 1978. In 1979 she won the "Premio David" award of the Unión de Escritores y Artistas de Cuba (UNEAC) for her poetry collection titled La aguja en el pajar. She contends that winning the "Premio David" award marked her official entrance into the Cuban literary world.

== Career after university ==
=== Journalism ===
After graduating University of Havana with a degree in History in 1978, Bobes dedicated her professional career to journalism. She notes that she chose this career path because it seemed like the only way she could make a living through writing. She worked as an editor for the culture section of Prensa Latina and the magazine Revolución y cultura for over ten years. In 1978 the Unión de Periodistas de Cuba (Union of Cuban Journalists) granted her an award for writing a series of articles about popular Cuban music. In an interview she says that her time in the journalism field, especially in the Culture department of Prensa Latina, served as a way for her to reflect on feminism and gender inequality especially in the work place. Most of the people she worked with in the Culture department of Prensa Latina were women, while all her bosses were male. She also sees her career in journalism as being important in her formation as a writer as it gave her discipline in her writing.

=== Poetry ===
Critics characterize Marilyn Bobes' poems as being feminist by bringing attention to the marginalized status of the female figure. In many of her poems she alludes to renowned female writers. In a few of her poems, such as "Triste oficio", she uses the voice of a male literary critic. Many critics see this as a way to bring attention to gender inequality and female marginalization.

Her first poetry collection, Alguien que está escribiendo su ternura pays homage to famous female poets that preceded her and experienced the hardships of being women writers. Among these are: Sor Juana Inés de la Cruz, Gertrudis Gómez de Avellaneda, Gabriela Mistral and Alfonsini Storni. The female figure is therefore a prominent subject in this collection.

She won the "Premio David" award for her poetry collection titled La aguja en el pajar in 1979. She then published another poetry collection, Hallar el modo, in 1989. The title of this collection alludes to Rosario Castellanos' famous poem, "Meditación en el umbral," and has thus been seen as consciously feminist. Her third poetry collection, Revi(c)itaciones y homenajes, published in 1998, uses intertextuality by alluding to concepts and figures that are prominent in the literary field such as José Martí, Jorge Luis Borges, Rainer Maria Rilke. By doing so, critics see this collection as engaging with postmodern concepts, and questioning female identity through the use of a multiplicity of voices.

=== Fiction ===
Bobes' narrative writing (composed of both short story collections and novels) are predominantly about women, especially women's roles in contemporary society. In a few of her works she also introduces Cuban social reality. She is known to focus on marginalized characters.

One of her most famous works, Alguien tiene que llorar is a collection of stories published in 1995, which won the Casa de las Américas award in 1996. In her most known story within this collection, also titled "Alguien tiene que llorar," Bobes presents a group of friends who are all coming to terms with and voicing their distinct opinions about the suicide of a woman named Maritza. Maritza is both admired and criticized for her sexual freedom and for prioritizing her career over her family. While many critics see this book as one of the first Cuban narratives to speak about lesbianism, Bobes herself argues that the book is about the judgements that people make on those who are different, as she never directly mentions homosexuality. Furthermore, she sees the Cuban economic crisis that began in 1989, deemed the Special Period in Time of Peace (Período especial), as key to this story in that it tackles individual crises stemming from the larger crisis occurring in the country. Another story within this collection, "Pregúntaselo a Dios," explores female characters in the context of Cuba, specifically the consequences of exile. The collection was edited again in Cuba, Argentina and Italy.

In 2005 Bobes received the "Premio Casa de las Américas de Novela" award for her first novel Fiebre de Invierno. The title alludes to the Dylan Thomas verse: "muda para decirle a la rosa encorvada/que doblega mi juventud la misma fiebre de invierno" [And I am dumb to tell the crooked rose/ My youth is bent by the same wintry fever]. The novel is about a forty-year-old woman who, after realizing her husband has been unfaithful, takes some time off to find herself. Set in Cuba during the 90s (The Special Period), the novel explores the inner world of a woman in her forties who has just divorced for the second time. Fiebre de Invierno alludes to pop culture references such as Sex and the City and figures including María Braun and Emma Bovary.

=== Anthologies ===
Bobes has dedicated a lot of her writing to increasing the visibility of Cuban women writers. She put together an anthology with Mirta Yáñez of Cuban women writers called Estatuas de Sal published in 1996. She explains that women were largely excluded in the literary world especially in Cuba before the 1990s, and thus this anthology is the first time in Cuba that a book compiles women's fiction exclusively. Bobes and Yáñez characterize this work as a "literary panorama." She sees this work as being a crucial starting point that put pressure on the very masculine world of literature.

Bobes also published a few other anthologies of women writing including Eros en la poesía Cubana (1995) and Cuentistas Cubanas inquietantes: antología sobre infidelidad (2003). She also compiled an anthology specifically about Alfonsina Storni called Entre el largo desierto y la mar (1999) and another one called Sombra seré que no dama: Antología poética (2000) containing poetry by Carilda Oliver.

== Bibliography ==
=== Poetry collections ===
- La aguja en el pajar (1980)
- Hallar el modo (1989)
- Revi(c)itaciones y homenajes (1998)

=== Short story collections ===
- Alguien tiene que llorar (1996)
- Alguien tiene que llorar otra vez (1999)
- Impresiones y Comentarios (2003)

=== Novels ===
- Fiebre de invierno (1999)
- Mujer perjura (2009)

=== Anthologies ===
- Eros en la poesía (1995)
- Estatuas de sal (1996)
- Entre el largo desierto y la mar (1999)
- Sombra seré que no dama (2000)
- Cuentistas Cubanas de hoy (2001)
- Cuentistas Cubanas inquietantes: antología sober infidelidad (2003)
- Cuentos infieles (2006)
- Más cuentos infieles (2007)

== Awards ==
- Premio David de Poesía de la Unión de Escritores y Artistas de Cuba (UNEAC) (1979)
- Premio Latinoamericano de Cuento "Edmundo Valadés" del Instituto de Bellas Artes de México, (1993)
- Premio Hispanoamericano de Cuento "Magda Portal" from the Flora Tristán Peruvian Women's Center (1994)
- Premio Casa de las Américas de Cuento, La Habana (1995)
- Premio Casa de las Américas de Novela (2005)
- Premio Iberoamericano Julio Cortázar (2016)
