= Nancy Morejón =

Cuban poet, critic, and essayist (born 1944)

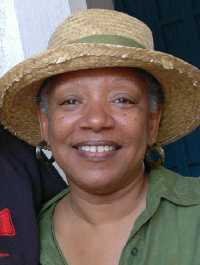
- Born: August 7, 1944 (age 82); Havana, Cuba
- Occupations: Poet; translator
- Writing career
- Language: Spanish
- Notable awards: Struga Golden Wreath laureate

Nancy Morejón (born August 7, 1944 in Havana) is a Cuban poet, critic, teacher, and essayist. She was a recipient of the Struga Poetry Evenings Golden Wreath Award and has been called "the best known and most widely translated woman poet of post-revolutionary Cuba".

== Biography ==
=== Early life ===
She was born and raised in a district of old Havana to working-class parents, Angélica Hernández Domínguez and Felipe Morejón Noyola. Her parents were both of African heritage.

Although her mother was Catholic, Nancy Morejón describes her family as nonreligious. Though religious images could be found in her home, Morejón only went to church with her mother until she was six or seven years old.

She began writing about her thoughts and surroundings at the age of nine, which later evolved into poetry with the encouragement of Prof. Elena López in 1959. The Cuban Revolution ended that very same year, to which Morejón credits her opportunity to attend university despite her socioeconomic status.

=== Education and career ===
Nancy Morejón is fluent in French and English. Before she got her high school degree in 1961, Morejón taught English, and she taught French before getting her college degree. In 1966, she graduated with honours from the University of Havana, the first Afro-Cuban to do so, having studied Caribbean and French literature. She is a well-regarded translator of French and English into Spanish, particularly Caribbean writers including Edouard Glissant, Jacques Roumain, Aimé Césaire and René Depestre. She has lectured at universities throughout the country and has taught at Wellesley College and the University of Missouri, which, in 1995, conducted a two-day symposium on her work and published the papers in a special issue of the Afro-Hispanic Review. Morejón, as of 2013, is director of Revista Union, the journal of the Unión de Escritores y Artistas de Cuba (the Union of Writers and Artists of Cuba; UNEAC); in 2008, she was elected president of the writer's section of UNEAC.

== Writing and awards ==
She has produced a number of journalistic, critical, and dramatic works. One of them is her book-length treatment of poet Nicolás Guillén. In 1982, she was awarded the Cuban "Premio de la Crítica" (Critic's Prize) for Piedra Pulida, and in 2001, she won Cuba's National Prize for Literature, awarded for the first time to a black woman. This national prize for literature was created in 1983; Nicolás Guillén was the first to receive it. She also won the Golden Wreath of the Struga Poetry Evenings for 2006. She has toured extensively in the United States and in other countries. Morejón's poetry has been translated into English, German, French, Portuguese, Galician, Russian, Macedonian, and other languages, and is included in the 1992 anthology Daughters of Africa, edited by Margaret Busby.

In 1999, Howard University Press in Washington, D.C., published in 1999, a collection of critical essays on her work: Singular Like a Bird: The Art of Nancy Morejon, compiled and prefaced by Miriam DeCosta-Willis, Ph.D. A collection of her poems entitled Richard trajo su flauta y otros argumentos (Richard brought his flute), edited by Mario Benedetti at Visor Books, was published in Madrid in the spring of 2005.

== Relationship with Nicolás Guillén ==
From the early 1970s until the early ‘80s, Nancy Morejón worked on Nación y mestizaje en Nicolás Guillén under the supervision of Mario Benedetti and Roberto Fernández Retamar, who requested that she her to analyze Guillén’s work. In the text, she contextualized Nicolás Guillén’s work as she delivered a critique of it, bringing up race, nation, and culture in Cuba before and after the Cuban Revolution.

Although Guillén was much older, Morejón describes him as a very close friend with whom she shared interests such as literature and sports. According to Abilio Estévez, a well- known Cuban, Nicolás Guillén greatly supported her. He included a tribute to her in one of his pieces called La rueda dentada.

== Literary analysis ==
Morejón's work explores a range of topics, such as the mythology of the Cuban nation and the relation of the Black people of Cuba within that nation. Her work treats political themes as well as intimate, familial topics. She often expresses an integrationist stance, in which Spanish and African cultures fuse to make a new Cuban identity. Much of her work—and the fact that she has been successful within the Cuban regime—locates her as a supporter of Cuban nationalism and the Cuban Revolution. Her work also treats slavery as an ancestral experience. Critics have noted her playful observations about her own people, her effective use of particularly Cuban forms of humor, and her regular "indulgence" in highly lyrical, intimate, spiritual, or erotic poetry. Through her poetry, Morejón brings forward less known history.She also integrates elements of Yoruba and other African spiritualities into her writing, reflecting Cuba’s religious landscape.

=== Influence of Communism ===
Like other Cuban writers of her time, Nancy Morejón’s poetry began incorporating political issues after the Cuban Revolution without making it outright propaganda. Morejón was fourteen years old when the Cuban Revolution ended. Although the revolution allowed her to further her education, she did not use her works as propaganda for the revolution’s ideologies, as was common during the 60s and 70s in Cuba. Nevertheless, the imagery and references in some of her poems, such as the ones from Richard trajo su flauta y otros argumentos, demonstrate the influence of the revolution on her work. It was during the 70s and 80s that her poetry incorporated more political themes. Overall, her works reflected one of the goals of the revolution, which was to get rid of legal inequality.

=== Representation of women ===
Morejón also weaved feminist ideals into some of her poems. Despite feminist ideology not being the catalyst for their creation, those poems are some of her most well known and they break away from the usual portrayal in literature of Afro-Hispanic women as sensual. In addition, she also voices the situation of women within her society, expressing concern for women's experience and for racial equality within the Cuban Revolution; often, black women are the protagonists in her poems, most notably in the widely anthologized Mujer Negra (Black Woman).

== Selected bibliography ==
- Amor, ciudad atribuída, poemas. Habana: Ediciones El Puente, 1964
- Elogio de la danza. Mexico City: La Universidad Nacional Autónoma de México, 1982
- Elogio y paisaje. Habana: Ediciones Unión, 1996
- Fundación de la imagen. Habana: Editorial Letras Cubanas, 1988
- Grenada Notebook/Cuaderno de Granada. Trans. Lisa Davis. New York: Círuculo de Cultura Cubana, 1984
- Mutismos. Habana: Ediciones El Puente, 1962
- Nación y mestizaje en Nicolás Guillén. Habana: Ediciones Unión, 1982
- Octubre imprescindible. Habana: Ediciones Unión, 1982
- Paisaje célebre. Caracas: Fundarte, Alcaldía de Caracas, 1993
- Parajes de una época. Habana: Editorial Letras Caubanas, 1979
- Piedra pulida. Habana: Editorial Letras Cubanas, 1986
- Poemas. Mexico City: Universidad Autónoma de México, 1980
- Poetas del mundo Latino en Tlaxcala. Tlaxcala: Universidad Autónoma de Tlaxcala, 1988
- Recopilación de textos sobre Nicolás Guillén, ed. Habana Casa de las Américas, 1974
- Richard trajo su flauta y otros argumentos. Habana: Unión de Escritores y Artistas de Cuba, 1967
- Where the Island Sleeps Like a Wing. Trans. Kathleen Weaver. San Francisco: The Black Scholar Press, 1985
- Mirar Adentro/Looking Within: Selected Poems, 1954-2000 (bilingual edition, African American Life Series). Ed. Juanamaria Cordones-Cook. Wayne State University Press, 2002, ISBN 9780814330371
- With Eyes and Soul: Images of Cuba. Trans. Pamela Carmell and David Frye. White Pine Press, 2004, ISBN 9781893996250

Monographs

- "A un muchacho," "Niña que lee en Estelí", "Soldado y yo". Toulouse: Caravelle, 1982
- Baladas para un sueño. Habana: Unión de Escritores y Artistas de Cuba, 1989
- Le Chaînon Poétique (in French). Trans. Sandra Monet-Descombey. Champigny-sur-Marne, France: Edition L. C. J., 1994
- Cuaderno de Granada. Habana: Casa de las Américas, 1984
- Dos poemas de Nancy Morejón. Drawings and design by Rolando Estévez. Matanzas, Cuba: Ediciones Vigía, 1989
- Lengua de pájaro. With Carmen Gonce. Habana: Instituto Cubano del Libro, 1971
- Poemas de amor y de muerte. Toulouse: Caravelle, 1993
- Ours the Earth. Trans. J. R. Pereira. Mona, Jamaica: Institute of Caribbean Studies, 1990
- El río de Martín Pérez y otros poemas. Drawings and design by Rolando Estévez. Matanzas, Cuba: Ediciones Vigía, 1996
