= Luis Álvarez Álvarez =

Cuban essayist, literary critic and researcher

- Born: Luis Álvarez Álvarez; 1951; Camagüey, Cuba
- Died: 31 May 2026 (aged 74–75); São Paulo, Brazil
- Education: University of Havana
- Occupations: Essayist, literary critic, researcher, poet and professor
- Writing career
- Genres: Essay, literary criticism, poetry
- Subjects: Cuban literature, cultural studies, cultural identity, film
- Notable works: Nicolás Guillén: identidad, diálogo, verso; Martí, biógrafo. Facetas del discurso histórico martiano; Circunvalar el arte; Introducción al cine; Fernando Pérez: cine, ciudades e intertextos
- Notable awards: National Prize for Literature (Cuba) (2017); National Prize for Cultural Research (2008); Critics' Prize (Cuba) (1999)

Luis Álvarez Álvarez (1951 – 31 May 2026) was a Cuban essayist, literary critic, researcher, poet, and university professor. His work focused primarily on Cuban literature, cultural studies, the thought of José Martí, the poetry of Nicolás Guillén, and the study of Cuban cinema. He held a Doctor of Philological Sciences and a Doctor of Sciences degree from the University of Havana, and worked for several decades as a professor and researcher. He was a member of the Academia Cubana de la Lengua and the author of an extensive body of essays and scholarly publications.

== Biography ==
=== Education and academic career ===
Luis Álvarez Álvarez was born in Camagüey in 1951. He graduated with a degree in Classical Languages and Literatures from the University of Havana in 1975 and subsequently obtained Doctor of Philological Sciences and Doctor of Sciences degrees. He pursued an extensive career as a professor and researcher and participated in the development of curricula and teaching programs for higher education. He worked at academic and cultural institutions in Cuba and played an important role in training researchers, professors, and critics. He became a member of the Academia Cubana de la Lengua in 2006. In 2023 he migrated to Brasil along with his wife Olga García Yero.

== Work ==
Álvarez's intellectual output focused primarily on essays, literary criticism, and cultural studies. His work combined literary analysis with historical, philosophical, and interdisciplinary perspectives, with particular attention to the relationships between literature, culture, and identity.

=== José Martí ===
One of the principal areas of his research was the study of José Martí. Álvarez approached Martí's work through literary criticism, intellectual history, and cultural studies. Among his works is Martí, biógrafo. Facetas del discurso histórico martiano, published by Editorial Oriente in 2007 with Matilde Varela Arístigueta and Carlos Palacio Fernández. The work received the Medardo Vitier Marti Prize for Criticism in 2008. Together with Armando García Forneiro, he also published José Martí: la justicia infinita, devoted to Martí's ethical thought.

=== Nicolás Guillén ===
Studies of Nicolás Guillén occupied a prominent place in his work. His monograph Nicolás Guillén: identidad, diálogo, verso, published by Editorial Oriente in Santiago de Cuba in 1997, examines Guillén's poetry from a perspective concerned with literature, culture, and Cuban identity. The book received the Critics' Prize in 1999 and was subsequently cited in academic studies of Guillén's poetry and Cuban cultural identity.

=== Cuban literature and culture ===
Álvarez also studied other major figures of Cuban literature, including Alejo Carpentier, Virgilio Piñera, Guillermo Cabrera Infante, José Lezama Lima, Severo Sarduy, and Emilio Ballagas. His research established connections between different generations of writers and examined questions of language, history, identity, and culture. Among his early books was Conversar con el otro (1990), a collection of essays on authors and issues in Cuban and world literature. In collaboration with Olga García Yero, he published El pensamiento cultural en el siglo XIX cubano, devoted to the analysis of ideas about nation, culture, and society developed during the 19th century. He also published Circunvalar el arte. La investigación cualitativa sobre la cultura y el arte (2003) with Juan Francisco Ramos Rico, a work devoted to methods for researching cultural and artistic phenomena.

=== Other literary studies ===
Álvarez conducted research on authors such as Virgilio Piñera and Guillermo Cabrera Infante. His works included "En torno al poeta Virgilio Piñera" and "Cabrera Infante: La colmena y el laberinto", published in Surco Sur. Together with Ana María González Mafud, he published De José Lezama Lima a Severo Sarduy. Lenguaje y neobarroco en Cuba, a study of neobaroque and 20th-century Cuban literature. The work received an honorable mention at the 2010 Casa de las Américas Prize.

=== Film ===
Another area of his work was film studies. Together with Armando Pérez Padrón, he published Introducción al cine, a work devoted to film language and its principal technical and expressive concepts. The book was published by Ediciones ICAIC and received attention from specialists such as Luciano Castillo and Fernando Pérez (director). Later, together with Pérez Padrón, he published Fernando Pérez. Cine, ciudades e intertextos, a study of the work of Cuban filmmaker Fernando Pérez.

== Awards and recognition ==
- Critics' Prize (1988), for La poesía de Nicolás Guillén.
- Critics' Prize (1999), for Nicolás Guillén: identidad, diálogo, verso.
- National Prize for Cultural Research (2008), for his body of research work.
- Medardo Vitier Marti Prize for Criticism (2008), for Martí, biógrafo. Facetas del discurso histórico martiano.
- Master of Youth Prize (2012), awarded by the Hermanos Saíz Association.
- National Prize for Literature (Cuba) (2017), awarded for his body of work.
- Honorary member of the Nicolás Guillén Foundation (2019).

== Selected works ==
- La poesía de Nicolás Guillén (1988).
- Conversar con el otro (1990).
- Nicolás Guillén: identidad, diálogo, verso (1997).
- Circunvalar el arte. La investigación cualitativa sobre la cultura y el arte (2003), with Juan Francisco Ramos Rico.
- Martí, biógrafo. Facetas del discurso histórico martiano (2007), with Matilde Varela Arístigueta and Carlos Palacio Fernández.
- De José Lezama Lima a Severo Sarduy. Lenguaje y neobarroco en Cuba (2014/2015), with Ana María González Mafud.
- El pensamiento cultural en el siglo XIX cubano (with Olga García Yero).
- Visión martiana de la cultura (with Olga García Yero).
- El arte de investigar el arte (2010), with Gaspar Barreto Argilagos.
- Introducción al cine (2010), with Armando Pérez Padrón.
- Fernando Pérez. Cine, ciudades e intertextos (2014/2015), with Armando Pérez Padrón.

== Bibliography ==
- Álvarez Álvarez, Luis (1997). Nicolás Guillén: identidad, diálogo, verso. Santiago de Cuba: Editorial Oriente. ISBN 9591102097.
- Álvarez Álvarez, Luis; Ramos Rico, Juan Francisco (2003). Circunvalar el arte: la investigación cualitativa sobre la cultura y el arte. Santiago de Cuba: Editorial Oriente.
- Álvarez Álvarez, Luis; Varela Arístigueta, Matilde; Palacio Fernández, Carlos (2007). Martí, biógrafo: facetas del discurso histórico martiano. Santiago de Cuba: Editorial Oriente.
- Álvarez Álvarez, Luis; Barreto Argilagos, Gaspar (2010). El arte de investigar el arte. Santiago de Cuba: Editorial Oriente.
- Álvarez Álvarez, Luis; Pérez Padrón, Armando (2010). Introducción al cine. Havana: Ediciones ICAIC.
- Álvarez Álvarez, Luis; González Mafud, Ana María (2014). De José Lezama Lima a Severo Sarduy: lenguaje y neobarroco en Cuba. Servizo de Publicacións e Intercambio Científico de la Universidade de Santiago de Compostela. ISBN 9788416183043.
- Álvarez Álvarez, Luis; Pérez Padrón, Armando (2014). Fernando Pérez: cine, ciudades e intertextos. Havana: Editorial Letras Cubanas.
