= Eduardo Heras León =

Cuban writer and professor (1940–2023)

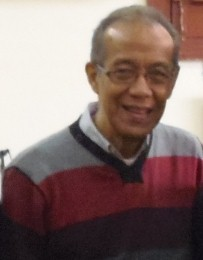
- Born: 5 August 1940; Cerro, Havana, Cuba
- Died: 12 April 2023 (aged 82)
- Awards: National Prize for Literature

Academic work
- Institutions: Centro de Formación Literaria Onelio Jorge Cardoso
- Notable works: La guerra tuvo seis nombres Los pasos en la hierba

Eduardo Rafael Heras León (5 August 1940 – 12 April 2023) was a Cuban writer and professor who was awarded with Cuba's National Literature Prize in 2014.

== Biography ==
León was born in Cerro, Havana, on 5 August 1940. At age 12 his father died, and he and his brothers had to work to support his family. In high school he collaborated with the rebels of the 26 July Movement.

In January 1959 he joined the revolutionary militia. He fought in support of the revolutionary government in the attack on the Bay of Pigs in April 1961. In 1968 he won the David Prize for his book La guerra tuvo seis nombres ("The War Had Six Names"). In 1970, he won another prize for the book Los pasos en la hierba ("The Steps on the Grass"), this time awarded by Casa de las Américas.

With the support of the Ministry of Culture and National Union of Writers and Artists of Cuba (UNEAC), he founded the Centro de Formación Literaria Onelio Jorge Cardoso in 1998, a place where young talents learn literary techniques.

In February 2015, he won the National Prize for Literature.

León died on 12 April 2023, at the age of 82.

== Bibliography ==
- La guerra tuvo seis nombres ("The War Had Six Names") (novel, won the 1968 David UNEAC Award)
- Los pasos en la hierba ("The Steps on the Grass") (stories, nominated for the 1970 CASA Award), several editions
- Acero ("Steel") (novel, Ed. Letras Cubanas, pub. 1977).
- A fuego limpio ("Clean Fire") (stories, Ed. Letras Cubanas, pub. 1981).
- Cuestión de principio ("For Principles") (stories, won 1983 UNEAC National Prize and 1986 National Critics' Prize)
- La nueva guerra ("The New War") (Short story anthology, Ed. Letras Cubanas, pub. 1989).
- Balada para un amor possible ("Song for an Impossible Love") (plaquette, Ed. Extramuros, 1992).
- La noche del capitán ("The Captain′s Night") (anthology, UNAM, 1995).
- Dolce vita ("Sweet Life") (Ediciones Unión, 2013)
- Cuentos Completos ("Stories of all a life", pub. 2014)
