= National Prize for Literature (Cuba) =

- Awarded for: National literature prize of Cuba
- Sponsored by: Cuban government
- Hosted by: Instituto Cubano del Libro (ICL)
- First award: 1983
- Final award: Active

National Prize for Literature (Premio Nacional de Literatura de Cuba) is the national literature prize of Cuba. It has been given annually since 1983 and recognizes those writers who have enriched the legacy of Cuban literature. It has been called "the most important award of its kind" in Cuba.

The award is granted by the Instituto Cubano del Libro (Cuban Book Institute part of the Ministry of Culture). The award was founded in 1982 by the Ministerio de Cultura (Ministry of Culture) of the Cuban government.

== Winners ==
- 1983 Nicolás Guillén
- 1984 José Zacarías Tallet
- 1985 Félix Pita Rodríguez
- 1986 Eliseo Diego, José Soler Puig, José Antonio Portuondo (shared)
- 1987 Dulce María Loynaz
- 1988 Cintio Vitier, Dora Alonso (shared)
- 1989 Roberto Fernández Retamar
- 1990 Fina García Marruz
- 1991 Ángel Augier
- 1992 Abelardo Estorino
- 1993 Francisco de Oraá
- 1994 Miguel Barnet
- 1995 Jesús Orta Ruiz
- 1996 Pablo Armando Fernández
- 1997 Carilda Oliver Labra
- 1998 Roberto Friol
- 1999 César López
- 2000 Antón Arrufat
- 2001 Nancy Morejón
- 2002 Lisandro Otero
- 2003 Reynaldo González
- 2004 Jaime Sarusky
- 2005 Graziella Pogolotti
- 2006 Leonardo Acosta
- 2007 Humberto Arenal
- 2008 Luis Marré
- 2009 Ambrosio Fornet
- 2010 Daniel Chavarría
- 2011 Nersys Felipe Herrera
- 2012 Leonardo Padura Fuentes
- 2013 Reina María Rodríguez
- 2014 Eduardo Rafael Heras León
- 2015 Rogelio Martínez Furé
- 2016 Margarita Mateo Palmer
- 2017 Luis Álvarez Álvarez
- 2018 Mirta Yáñez
- 2019 Lina de Feria Barrio
- 2020 Eugenio Hernández Espinosa
- 2021 Julio Travieso Serrano
