= Dora Alonso =

Cuban journalist and writer

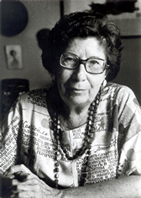
Dora Alonso

Dora Alonso (born Doralina de la Caridad Alonso-Perez on December 22, 1910, in Maximo Gomez, Matanzas, Cuba – March 21, 2001, in Cuba) was a Cuban journalist and writer who worked in both print and radio. She wrote novels, short stories, poetry, theater and children's literature. She was also a radio and television script writer and a war correspondent.

== Biography ==
Dora Alonso was born in Máximo Gómez, Matanzas, Cuba on December 22, 1910, to Adela Pérez de Corcho Rodríguez and David Alonso Fernández.

Her first poem, "Amor", appeared in the newspaper El Mundo. In 1933 she became a correspondent of the newspaper Prensa Libre (Free Press). She joined the anti-imperialist organization Joven Cuba in 1934 and met Constantino Barredo Guerra, with whom she had a relationship (including joint revolutionary activities) until 1938. During this time she also wrote her first radio scripts. In 1936, one of her first short stories on social issues was awarded first place in a literary contest by the literary magazine, Bohemia. In 1942, Alonso started writing for the magazine Lux (Light), published by the Sindicate Federation of Electric Stations of Gas and Water, which featured her first interviews with several personalities and political figures, such as Ti Tsun Li (Chinese ambassador in Cuba) and Chilean poet Pablo Neruda. She also received an award from Alianza Cubana por un Mundo Libre (Cuban Alliance for World Freedom). In the 1950s she wrote theatrical scripts for the Cuban puppet show Pelusín del Monte, which was a Cuban television show.

Alonso is a well-known children's writer and her works have been translated and distributed in other countries. She is the most translated and published Cuban author for children. Her narrative style is based on simplicity and handling of emotions. An important subject of her works is the Cuban farmer showing his human values and love for nature.

One of her most famous books, The Year 1961, which chronicled her experiences during the Bay of Pigs invasion as a war correspondent at Playa Girón, Cuba, won the Casa de las Américas Award.

Two of her radio novels, Tierra Brava and Soy el Batey, have been made into movies by the Instituto Cubano de Radio y Televisión (ICRT). Tierra Inerme, another of her novels, received the highest recognition at II Spanish American Literary Contest at Casa de las Américas.

Alonso died on March 21, 2001, at age 90.

== Selected works ==
- Tierra Inerme
- The Year 1961
- Tierra Brava
- Sol de Batey
- Aventuras de Guille
- Palomar
- El grillo caminante
- El caballito enano
- La flauta de chocolate
- Teatro para niños
- Tres lechuzas en un cuento
- El cochero azul
- El valle de la Pájara Pinta

== Awards ==
- 1936 - Bohemia magazine awarded her recognition for her short stories.
- 1942 - Poetry prize
- 1944 - Novel National Award for Tierra Inerme
- 1961 - Casa de las Americas prize for her novel Tierra Inerme (1961).
- 1980 - Casa de las Americas prize for the children's book El valle de la pájara pinta (1979).
- 1981 - Distinction for National Culture
- 1988 - Félix Varela Order (1st grade)
- 1988 - National Prize for Literature
- 1997 - José Martí Infant Literature World Prize
- 1994 - National Prize of Novel (conferred by Education Ministry)

== See also ==
- Cuban literature
