= Mirta Yáñez =

Cuban philologist, teacher and writer

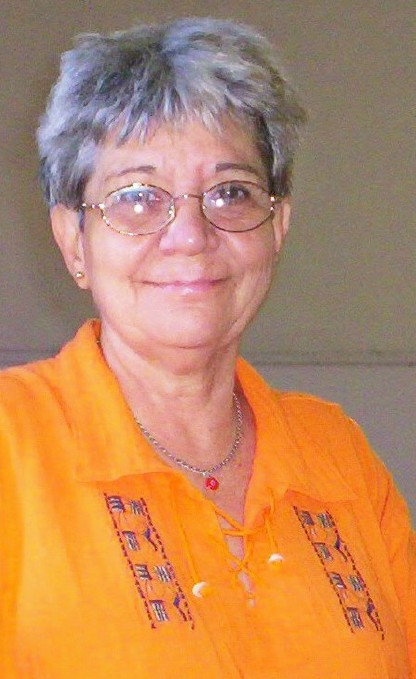
- Born: 1947; Havana
- Occupations: Literary critic, poet, short story writer, writer, novelist

Mirta Gloria Yáñez Quiñoa is a Cuban philologist, teacher and writer.

== Early life ==
Yáñez was born in Havana in 1947.

== Career ==
She graduated from high school in Raúl Cepero Bonilla Special Pre-university Institute, where she was considered a high-performing student. She entered the University of Havana in 1965, graduating five years later. She earned a PhD in philology (1992) at the same university, specializing in Latin American and Cuban literature, as well as in studies on Cuban women's literary discourse. She worked for many years teaching and conducting research at the University of Havana.

She was made a member of the Academia Cubana de la Lengua in 2015.

== Awards ==
- 1970: Premio de Poesía del Concurso 13 de Marzo por el poemario Las visitas
- 1977: Premio de Narrativa del concurso La Edad de Oro
- 1988: Premio de la Crítica por el libro de cuentos El diablo son las cosas
- 1990: Premio de la Crítica por el ensayo La narrativa romántica en Latinoamérica
- 1999: Premio Memoria otorgado por el Centro Cultural Pablo de la Torriente Brau
- 2001: Forderpreis der Iniciative LiBeraturpreis, Frankfurt, Alemania
- 2005: Premio de la Crítica por el libro de cuentos Falsos Documentos
- 2010: Premio de la Crítica por la novela Sangra por la herida
- 2012: Premio de la Academia Cubana de la Lengua por Sangra por la herida
- Premio Nacional de Literatura 2018, Ministry of Culture

== Selected works ==
=== Stories ===
- Sangra por la herida, 2010
- El búfalo ciego y otros cuentos, 2008
- Serafín y las aventuras en el Reino de los Comejenes, 2007
- Falsos documentos. Cuentos, 2005
- Habaneras. [Tafalla, Spain]: Txalaparta. 2000. ISBN 978-84-8136-172-8. OCLC 45345696.
- Narraciones desordenadas e incompletas, 1997 (in Spanish)
- El diablo son las cosas. Cuentos, 1988 (in Spanish)
- La hora de los mameyes, 1983 (in Spanish)
- Yo soy Jack Johnson, 1982 (in Spanish)
- La Habana es una ciudad bien grande, 1980 (in Spanish)
- Serafín y sus aventuras con los caballitos, 1979 (in Spanish)
- Todos los negros tomamos café, 1976 (in Spanish)

=== Poetry ===
- Un solo bosque negro, 2003 (in Spanish)
- Algún lugar en ruinas, 1997 (in Spanish)
- Poesía casi completa de Jiribilla el conejo, 1994 (in Spanish)
- Poemas, 1987 (in Spanish)
- Las visitas y otros poemas, 1986 (in Spanish)
- Las visitas, 1971 (in Spanish)

=== Essays and critiques ===
- Cubanas a capítulo. Segunda temporada, 2009 (in Spanish)
- El Matadero: un modelo para desarmar, 2005 (in Spanish)
- Cubanas a capítulo, 2000 (in Spanish)
- La narrativa romántica en Latinoamérica, 1990 (in Spanish)
- El mundo literario prehispánico (collaboration), 1986 (in Spanish)

=== As editor ===
- Cubana: Contemporary Fiction by Cuban Women. Beacon Press.

=== Articles ===
- Yañez, Mirta (31 December 1995). "Estatuas de sal: Las cuentistas Cubanas de Hoy". Verba Hispanica (in Spanish). 5 (1): 47–53. doi:10.4312/vh.5.1.47-53. ISSN 2350-4250.
