= Ángel Arango =

Cuban writer

Ángel José Arango Rodriguez (March 25, 1926, La Habana – February 19, 2013, Miami), better known as Ángel Arango, was a Cuban writer of science fiction. A pioneer of the genre, he was considered its leading exponent on the island.

== Biography ==
Ángel Arango was a Doctor of Civil Law at the University of Havana, where he specialized in aviation law. In this capacity, he published several articles in journals serving arbitrators and expert legal consultants from the International Civil Aviation Organization. He was a member of the Ibero-American Institute of Aeronautical and Space Law in Madrid, but throughout his life worked at the Institute of Civil Aeronautics of Cuba.

Arango began his career as a realist writer, but later devoted himself to the genre of science fiction. He was one of the three founding fathers of modern sci-fi in Cuba along with Oscar Hurtado (1919-1977) and Miguel Collazo (1936-1999). In 1964, Arango published his first collection of science fiction tales, titled Where Do the Celphalhoms Go? which, along with The Dead City Korad by Hurtado and The Fantastic Book of Oaj by Collazo, marked the creation of the sci-fi genre in Cuba. During the late 1960s, Arango published two more works, The Black Planet and Robotomachy.

In 1982, he published the novel Transparency, which further develops the concept and setting underlying Where Do the Celphalhoms Go? This novel inaugurated a series that includes Situation (1984) and Sider (1994), in which the author explored a basic premise – in his words, to "contemplate, albeit hypothetically, the process of the truth in a more advanced stage of civilization". In 2009 he emigrated to Miami. Arango died before his last novel, Spinal Bifida, was published.

== Work ==
- Where Do the Celphalhoms Go? (Tales), Notebooks R, 1964.
- The Black Planet (Tales), Dragon collection, Art and Literature, 1966.
- Robotomaquia (Tales), Union Releases, 1967.
- The End of the Chaos Comes Quietly (Tales), Union Releases, 1971.
- The Creatures (Tales), Cuban Lyrics, 1978.
- The Rainbow Monkey (Tales), Collection Radar No. 17, Cuban Letters, 1980.
- Transparency (Novel), Union Releases, 1982.
- Economic Situation (Novel), Union Releases, 1984.
- Sider (Novel), Union of Writers and Artists of Cuba, 1994.
- Spinal Bifida (Novel), Forthcoming.

== Sources ==
- "Angel Arango." Angel Arango. Locus Publications, 1 Mar. 2013. Web. 29 May 2013.
- "SFE: The Science Fiction Encyclopedia." Authors : Arango, Ángel : SFE : Science Fiction Encyclopedia. N.p., 25 Mar. 2013. Web. 29 May 2013.
- Spinola, Gerardo C. "Guaicán Literario: Angel Arango." Guaicán Literario: Angel Arango. N.p., 17 June 2000. Web. 29 May 2013.
