= Vitier =

Vitier is a surname. Notable people with the surname include:

- Cintio Vitier (1921–2009), Cuban poet and writer
- José María Vitier (born 1954), Cuban composer and pianist
