= International Botev Prize =

The International Botev Prize (Bulgarian: Международна ботевска награда) is a Bulgarian award presented to individuals with significant accomplishments in the field of literature.

It was established in 1972 and is named after Hristo Botev, an iconic Bulgarian revolutionary, journalist and poet.

== Awarded ==
This list is incomplete. The award is presented in different categories every 5 years. The International Botev Prize was not awarded between 1986 and 1996.

=== 1976 ===
- (Soviet Union) Alexey Surkov (1976)
- (Cuba) Nicolás Guillén (1976)
- (France) Pierre Seghers (1976)
- (Hungary) László Nagy (1976)

=== 1981 ===
- (Spain) Rafael Alberti (1981)
- (Syria) Ahmad al-Ahmad (1981)
- (Socialist Federal Republic of Yugoslavia) Miroslav Krleža (1981)
- (Soviet Union) Rasul Gamzatov (1981)

=== 1986 ===
- (Germany) Günter Wallraff (1986)
- (Soviet Union) Nil Hilevich (1986)
- (Uruguay) Mario Benedetti (1986)
- (Soviet Union) Dmytro Pavlychko (1986)

=== 1996 ===
- (South Africa) Nadine Gordimer (1996)
- (Bulgaria) Valeri Petrov (1996)

=== 2001 ===
- (North Macedonia) Branko Cvetkovski (2001)
- (Bulgaria) Nikola Indzhov (2001)

=== 2006 ===
- (Russia) Yevgeny Yevtushenko (2006)

=== 2008 ===
- (Russia) Aleksandr Solzhenitsyn (2008) – exceptional award in commemoration of his death
