= Antón Arrufat =

Cuban dramatist (1935–2023)

Antón Arrufat Mrad (14 August 1935 – 21 May 2023) was a Cuban dramatist, novelist, short story writer, poet and essayist.

== Life and career ==
Arrufat was born in Santiago de Cuba, Cuba on 14 August 1935. He was of mixed Catalan and Lebanese parentage. At the age of 11, he moved with his family from Santiago de Cuba to Havana. He studied philology at the University of Havana. His first book appeared in 1962, a collection of his early poems. He won the Premio Nacional de Literatura de Cuba in 2000.

The Antón Arrufat Papers are held at Princeton University Library. They consist "of manuscripts of poems, short stories, novels, and criticism by Antón Arrufat, Virgilio Piñera, and Witold Gombrowicz; and correspondence of Antón Arrufat."

== Death ==
Arrufat died of bronchopneumonia on 21 May 2023, at the age of 87.

== Works ==
- El caso se investiga, pieza estrenada en 1957
- En claro, poesía, 1962
- Mi antagonista y otras observaciones, cuentos, 1963
- Repaso final, poesía, 1963
- Teatro, colección de piezas, 1963
- Todos los domingos, teatro, 1964
- Escrito en las puertas, poesía, 1968
- Los siete contra Tebas teatro, 1968
- La caja está cerrada, novela, 1984
- La huella en la arena, poesía, 1986
- La tierra permanente, teatro, 1987
- ¿Qué harás después de mí?, cuentos, 1988
- Las pequeñas cosas, prosas, 1988
- Cámara de amor, teatro, 1994
- Lirios sobre un fondo de espadas, poesía, 1995
- La divina Fanny, teatro, 1995
- Virgilio Piñera: entre él y yo, ensayo, 1995
- Ejercicios para hacer de la esterilidad virtud, cuentos, 1998
- El viejo carpintero, poesía, 1999
- La noche del Aguafiestas, novela, 2000
- Las tres partes del criollo, teatro, 2003
- El hombre discursivo, ensayos, ed Letras Cubanas, 2005
- El convidado del juicio, ensayos, ed. Ediciones Unión, 2015
