= Lisandro Otero =

Cuban novelist and journalist (1932–2008)

Lisandro Otero González (June 4, 1932 – January 3, 2008) was a Cuban novelist and journalist.

== Background ==
Born in Havana, Cuba, Otero won Cuba's National Prize in Literature in 2002 and was the director of Cuban Academy of Language from October 2004 until his death. He also was a member of The Royal Academy of Spanish Language and the North American Academy of the Spanish Language. Graduating with degrees of Journalism and Philosophy and Letters in 1954 at the Havana University, he also studied at The Sorbonne in Paris. (1954–1956).

Major publications of the country such as Revolución, Cuba Magazine and Revolución y Cultura have been directed by him. He has written for publications such as Bohemia, Carteles, Granma, Juventud Rebelde, El Mundo, Casa de las Américas, Unión, La Gaceta de Cuba de Cuba, Le Monde Diplomatique, Partisans, Europe, The Washington Post and Excelsior.

Otero won the Novel Prize in Casa de las Américas Contest in 1963 with La situación (The Situation). In 1965, he won an award at the Biblioteca Breve from Seix Parral Editorial Awards in Barcelona for his novel Pasión de Urbino (Urbino's Passion) and received the Literary Critics Prize for Temporadas de Angeles (Angel's Season) (1983).

He undertook diplomatic activities as cultural counselor in the Cuban embassies of Chile, Great Britain and Soviet Union. He penned the script for the musical comedy El Solar, which has been made into a movie and a ballet. His works have been translated into many languages.

In the early 1990s Otero voiced his opinion of his native Cuba thus: "In the early 1980s I was in the diplomatic corps in the Soviet Union. The situation was dreadful -- long lines, shabby housing, no bread, little food. 'Yes,' they'd acknowledge. 'But we have the Bolshoi Ballet, the best in the world!' Well, now --'Yes, but we have the best amateur baseball team in the world!'"

Otero has received the National Prize of Journalism in Cuba, the Félix Elmuza Order, the Medal for Fighter of Clandestine Struggle, the Commemorative Medal for the Thirtieth Anniversary of the Cuban Armed Forces and the Alejo Carpentier Medal. He also received the National Order of Excellence conferred by the French government and the National Prize of Journalism bestowed by the Journalists Club of Mexico.

== Selected works ==
- 1955: Tabaco para un Jueves Santo y otros cuentos cubanos (Tobacco for a Blessed Thursday and other Cuban Tales), Paris, Cuba: Z.D.A., Havana, 1960.
- 1963: La situación (The Situation) Havana, 1963; Santiago de Chile, 1967; Havana, 1975.
- 1966: Pasión de Urbino (Urbino's Passion), Buenos Aires, 1966; Havana, 1967.
- 1970: En busca de Viet Nam (Finding Vietnam) (essays), Havana
- 1970: En ciudad semejante (novel), Havana, 1970.
- 1983: Temporada de Angeles (Angels Season), Havana, 1983, Bolero, 1984.
- 1997: Llover sobre mojado (When it Rains, it Pours), Havana,
- 1990: El árbol de la vida (The Tree of Life), 1990;
- 2003: De Gutenberg a Bill Gates (From Gutenberg to Bill Gates) Havana
- 2004: Charada Havana
