= Bob Baldock =

American artist and bookseller (1937–2022)

Robert Lee Baldock (April 30, 1937 – October 22, 2022) was one of the few U.S. citizens to participate in the Cuban Revolution as a combatant in Fidel Castro's unit based in the Sierra Maestra in 1958. He went on to have a substantial career as a bookman. For twenty years he worked at Moe's Books in Berkeley, California, following which he initiated and cofounded the successful Black Oak Books, a store distinguished by its influential series of author readings. After being forced out of Black Oak Books, he went to work for KPFA Radio, the first listener-sponsored FM radio in the U.S. For over twenty years he produced public events for KPFA. As a poster artist he created original posters for these events, a number of which are in the collection of Oakland Museum of California. He was also a painter and maker of fine art prints and broadsides.

== In the 26th of July Movement, Cuba ==
Robert Lee Baldock was born in Dayton, Ohio on April 30, 1937. After graduation from Sewickley High School, near Pittsburgh, Pennsylvania, Baldock studied for two years at Ohio University in Athens, (1955–57), receiving military training in the Army ROTC program, which proved significant when Baldock became a combatant in the 26th of July Movement insurgency against Fulgencio Batista led by Fidel Castro in Cuba. He became aware of the Cuban Revolution seeing movie newsreels in Akron, where he was working at a B.F. Goodrich rubber plant in the fall of 1957. He went on to work at the New York Herald Tribune as a copyboy; there he had privileged access to ticker-tape coverage of the Cuban insurrectionary movement as well as to maps and press passes. With a college friend who knew Spanish he made his way to Havana in the spring of 1958. From Havana the two made their way to the Sierra Maestra, where they encountered and eventually were allowed to join Fidel Castro's group of rebel combatants, which included (besides Castro) Celia Sánchez, Haydée Santamaría, and Camilo Cienfuegos. An article on his time with the Cuban rebels, published in August 1959, states that he was "just back from a two-month visit to Fidel Castro's mountain stronghold". This article, however, also mentions that they started for Cuba March 1 and were just back in August. By his own account in a manuscript chronology of his life he states that he and McIver arrived in Havana in March 1958 and by late June he was ill with dysentery and by July he was hospitalized in Miami. How long it took them to cross the island and meet up with Fidel and his group is uncertain, as are exact dates of arrival and departure. Baldock reported that he and his friend were moved covertly out of the country through an underground network consisting primarily of small Catholic churches. In Miami, hospitalized, he met with a United Press representative to whom he gave the two notebooks of his observations and interviews, consenting for them to be used as needed by UP. These notebooks were subsequently lost. In 2021, an autobiographical novel, Wild Green Oranges, based on his experience in Cuba, was published by the Clapton Press, London. This novel is a major revision of the manuscript written shortly after his return from Cuba.

== Career as Bookman ==
Back in New York City, in August 1958, Baldock enrolled in Washington Square College of Arts & Sciences, New York University, and studied journalism for a semester while working at the Marboro bookstore on 8th St., then at Paperback Gallery. An important friend met at that time was Anaïs Nin In 1959 he went to Europe. His story "Salt Air," was published in Olympia, the bi-monthly review published by the Olympia Press in Paris, and subsequently won a $1000 prize. ; He was given work as a proofreader and copywriter by Olympia Press, controversial publisher of William S. Burroughs' Naked Lunch and Nabokov's Lolita. For several months he worked (in the absence of owner George Whitman) in the bookstore Le Mistral, later renamed Shakespeare and Company after the famous bookshop founded by Sylvia Beach.

In 1962 Baldock settled in Berkeley, California, where he soon began a major work stint at Moe's Books, hub of counter-culture and anti-war activities in the 1960s and 1970s on Telegraph Avenue; he helped build this store into a four-storey emporium of used, new, and remaindered books with an art and antiquarian shop on the top floor.

During those years he collaborated with letterpress printer Wesley Tanner designing and printing the broadsides given out at Moe's Books. In 1974 he began an extensive series of portraits in various media of African-American subjects. A selection of these were presented at a one-man show at The Art Co-op (later A..C.C.I. Gallery in Berkeley, 1980; He also designed a number of book covers for W.W. Norton & Company, including a series for their reissue of works by Rainer Maria Rilke in the 1990s.

In 1982, after twenty years at Moe's Books, Baldock co-founded Black Oak Books in north Berkeley, with partners Bob Brown and Don Pretari. As president of the corporation he undertook (with the participation of partner Pretari and staffer Victoria Shoemaker) a popular series of in-store readings, showcasing many authors of international repute, including Carlos Fuentes, Czeslaw Milosz, Edna O'Brien, Isabel Allende, Toni Morrison, Eduardo Galeano, Alice Walker, Gore Vidal, Salman Rushdie, Edward Said, Alice Waters, Tom Wolfe, Barry Lopez, Nancy Morejón, and others. In connection with these readings, many broadsides were produced, often printed by the Okeanos Press under Eric Johnson; many of these broadsides Baldock designed.

Not long after separating from Jeanne Forrest Baldock in 1985, he met his future wife, writer and translator Kathleen Weaver; they were married July 13, 1990. Through her he became involved again in progressive politics, specifically in Nicaraguan and Salvadoran solidarity work. In 1989, he left Black Oak, following a hostile takeover by his partners.

In 1996 he received recognition for outstanding service to the reading community by being awarded "The Decca," "an award in honor of Jessica Mitford" presented by the San Francisco Bay Area Book Council on the occasion of the 7th Annual San Francisco Book Festival, November 2, 1996.

== Events producer and poster artist, KPFA Radio ==
Baldock started working for KPFA Radio, 94.1 FM, in Berkeley, in 1989. Over the following decades he has produced well over three hundred public events with writers and occasionally musicians, fundraisers for KPFA and the parent Pacifica network, often in conjunction with other non-profit organizations. For over twenty years he has co-produced the KPFA events with Ken Preston.The events are routinely recorded for subsequent radio broadcast and webcast, with dissemination in CD and DVD format. For most events he produced original posters, at first often silkscreened, later produced digitally; he also designed posters for UC Berkeley Graduate Journalism Dept; and for UCB International Studies Department. A collection of his posters is in the Oakland Museum of California. His posters are featured on his website, along with other artworks. Some posters are displayed on the KPFA website.

== Personal life and death ==
His father was Robert Lee Baldock Sr., his mother, Bertha Elizabeth Lyon Baldock, both from the midwestern United States and of northern European extraction. He had one brother, Earl Lyon Baldock, (1940-2002). He fathered four children, two with his first wife, Maria Champion: Paul Michel Baldock Collins and Lisa Diane Collins Raines; two with his third wife, Jeanne: Andrew Charles Baldock and Kita Megan Baldock. He remained with Kathleen Weaver until the end of his life.

Bob Baldock died in Berkeley, California on October 22, 2022, at the age of 85.

== Works referencing ==
- Cometbus, Aaron. The Loneliness of the Electric Menorah, Cometbus #51, Bloomington: Microcosm Publishing, 2008. A history of Berkeley bookshops.
- "Former Castro Follower Now Insurance Man." Columbus Citizen, byline Bill Gold, Columbus, Ohio, c. late 1959.
- Lives That Changed the World: Fidel Castro, 2007. Discovery Films: Exploration Production, Toronto, Canada. Features Baldock and several others who speak about the effect Castro had on their respective lives.
- "Los Baldock: una imagen en dos tiempos." Juventud Rebelde, 16 February 1992. Internacionales, by-line Marina Menéndez, Havana, Cuba.
- "Palace Coup at Black Oak," Express, Berkeley, July 14, 1989.
- "Sewickley Man Visits Cuban Rebel Chief," Pittsburgh Press, c. August, 1959, Pittsburgh, Pennsylvania.
- Williams, Gerald, "Paris, Porn and What Passed for Love," New Letters, Vol. 66, No. 2, pages 102–120, 2000. Recalling Paris and working at Olympia Press.

== Selected publications by ==
- "KPFA's 60th Anniversary Celebration". Open Exchange Magazine: #185 / Vol. 36, No. 2, April / May / June 2009 printed & online:

http://www.openexchange.org/archives/AMJ09/kpfa.html

- "Salt Air", Olympia. No 4, April, 1963, Paris: Olympia Press. A short story.
- "Since He Left Us", in On The Finest Shore: Poems and Reminiscences of Moe, Berkeley, 1997. Obituary tributes to Moe Moskowitz, owner of Moe's Books. print and online (to link click "Cached" on the site) : https://web.archive.org/web/20110714111155/http://www.moesbooks.com/pages/A-Tribute-to-Moe.html - Cached

== Novels ==
- Wild Green Oranges (Fictionalised account of Cuban experience written in 1959, first published 2021 by The Clapton Press.
- Bright Sidewalks, 1961 (manuscript).

== Letters archived ==
Letters to and from Anaïs Nin

- Letters from Robert Baldock to Anaïs Nin: Box 32, Folder 5; Box 33, Folder 1; Box 33, Folder 7; Box 33, Folder 8; Box 36, Folder 2; Letters from Ana ïs Nin to Robert Baldock, Box 33, Folder 7. In Anaïs Nin Papers, UCLA Library, Department of Special Collections, Manuscripts Division, Charles E. Young Research Library, Los Angeles.

== Book cover designs ==
- Alegría, Claribel and Darwin J. Flakoll. Ashes of Izalco, trans. Darwin J. Flakoll. Willamantic, CT: Curbstone Press, 1989.
- Cortázar, Julio. Nicaraguan Sketches, trans. Kathleen Weaver, W. W. Norton, 1989.
- Emerson, Gloria. Winners and Losers, paper edition, New York, London: W. W. Norton, 1992.
- Morales, Arqueles, Peace Has Yet To Be Won, Selected Poems from La paz aún no ganada, trans. William Greenwood. Santa Cruz: Green Horse Two, 1974.
- Rilke, Rainer Maria, editions by W. W. Norton, New York, 1992–94. Translations from the Poetry of Rainer Maria Rilke; Letters To a Young Poet; Sonnets To Orpheus; Rilke On Love and Other Difficulties; Duino Elegies; Stories of God. The cover designs feature original paintings by Baldock.
- Weaver, Kathleen, Peruvian Rebel, The World of Magda Portal, With a Selection of Her Poems, Penn State University Press, 2009.
