= Félix Pita Rodríguez =

Cuban journalist, poet and literary critic

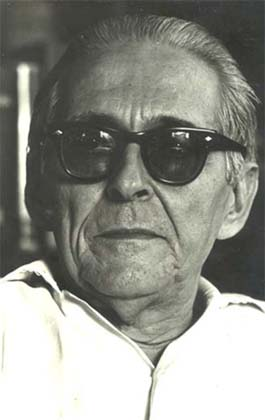
Félix Pita Rodríguez

Félix Pita Rodriguez (1909-1990) was a Cuban journalist, poet and literary critic. He was born in Bejucal. An active communist, Rodriguez helped to found the Ibero-American Anti-Fascist Committee during the Spanish Civil War. His literary acquaintances included Pablo Neruda. He was exiled from Cuba for many years, living in Latin America and Europe. After Castro's overthrow of the Batista government, he returned to Cuba in 1960. He won Cuba's National Literary Prize in 1985.

== Works ==
- San Abul de Montecallado, 1945
- Corcel de Fuego, 1948
- Tobías, 1955
- Las Noches, 1964
- Historia tan Natural, 1971
- Niños de Vietnam, 1974
- Poesía y Prosa, 1976
- La Pipa de Cerezo, 1987
- Asesor Literario de la Serie de la TV Cubana- En silencio ha tenido que ser, 1979
