= Daniel Chavarría =

Uruguayan revolutionary and writer (1933–2018)

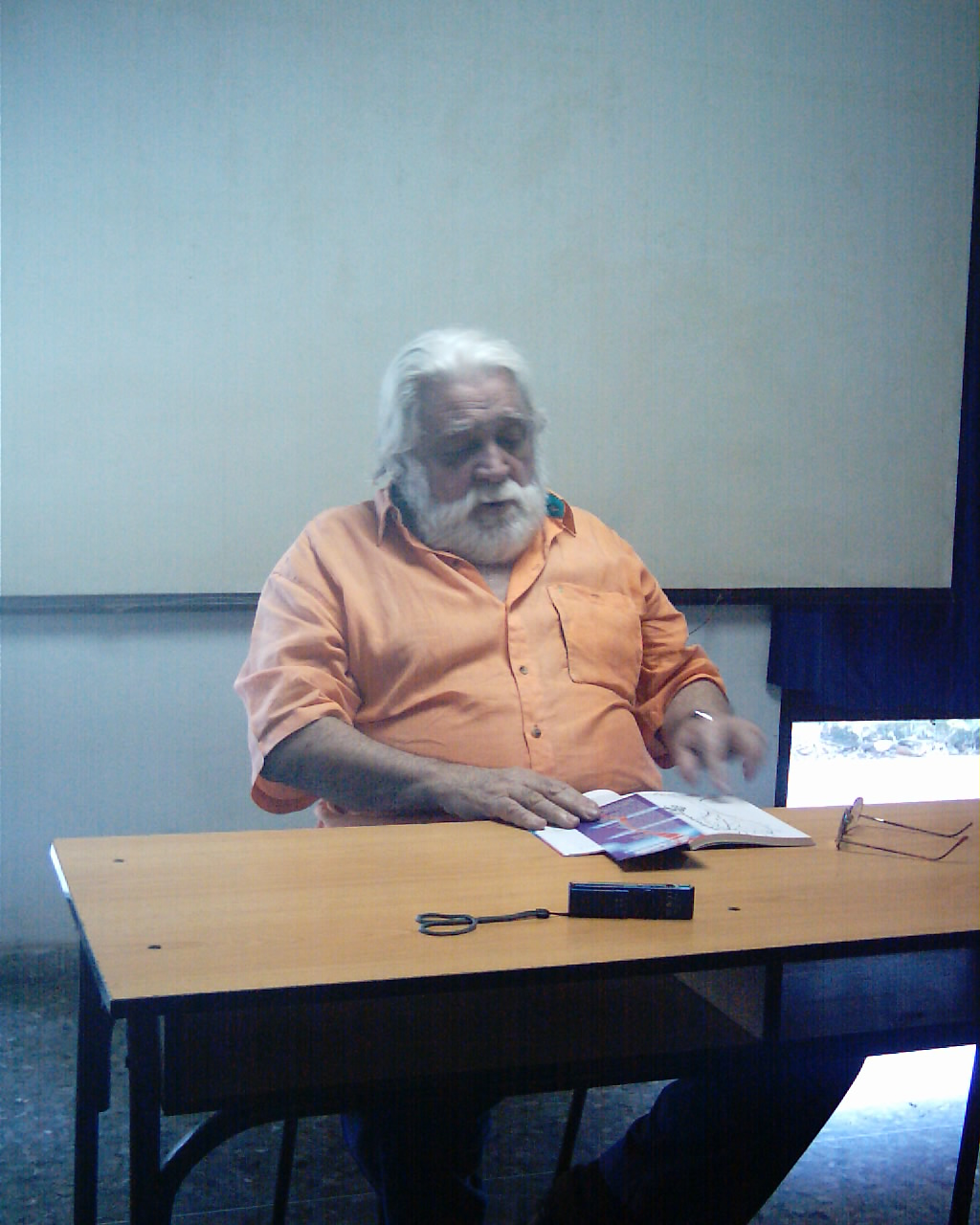
- Chavarría
- Born: 23 November 1933; San José de Mayo
- Died: 6 April 2018 (aged 84); Havana, Cuba
- Occupations: Writer, Translator
- Writing career
- Language: Spanish

Daniel Chavarría (23 November 1933 – 6 April 2018) was a Uruguayan revolutionary, writer and translator, who lived in Cuba since the 1960s. He had a son with Dora Salazar, Daniel Chavarria, and raised his sister.

== Life and works ==
Daniel Chavarría was born in San José de Mayo, Uruguay.

In 1964, while Chavarría was living in Brazil, there was a military coup and he fled to work amongst the gold seekers in the Amazon. Later on, he fled to Cuba. There he began working as a Latin and Greek translator and teacher. Subsequently he began his career as a writer. Daniel Chavarría defined himself as a Uruguayan citizen and a Cuban writer.

Chavarría’s style of writing is within the Latin American tradition of political writers, such as Gabriel García Márquez. He mentioned that as a child, he read Jules Verne, Emilio Salgari and Alexandre Dumas, and their influence can be detected in his writing. For example, in Tango for a Torturer, the influence of The Count of Monte Cristo is clear.

Chavarría’s life and writings clearly show his communist and revolutionary background. He was a well known supporter of the Cuban Revolution.

In 2010, Chavarría won Cuba's National Prize for Literature.

Chavarría died in Havana on 6 April 2018, aged 84.

== Bibliography ==
- 1978 Joy
- 1984 The 6th Island
- 1991 Allá Ellos
- 1993 The Eye of Cybele
- 1994 Adiós muchachos
- 1999 That Year in Madrid
- 2001 Tango for a Torturer
- 2001 El rojo en la pluma del loro
- 2004 Viudas de sangre
- 2005 Príapos
- 2006 Una pica en Flandes

== Awards ==
Joy:

- Aniversario de la Revolución, La Habana, 1975.
- Capitán San Luis, 1978.

The 6th island:

- Premio de la Crítica, La Habana.

Allá ellos:

- Dashiell Hammett Award, Gijón, 1992.

The Eye of Cybele:

- Planeta-Joaquín Mortiz, México, 1993.
- Educación y Cultura, Montevideo, 1994.
- Ennio Flaiano, Pescara, 1998.
- Premio de la Crítica, La Habana.

Adiós Muchachos:

- Edgar Allan Poe Award - Best Paperback Original, New York, 2002

Tango for a Torturer:

- Casa de las Américas Prize, La Habana, 2000.
- Premio de la Crítica, La Habana.

Viudas de sangre:

- Premio Alejo Carpentier, La Habana, 2004.

Other

- National Prize for Literature, 2010
