= Malcolm B. Willis =

English geneticist (1935–2011)

Malcolm B. Willis (13 May 1935 – 19 July 2011) was an English geneticist and senior lecturer in Animal Breeding and Genetics at Newcastle University. He studied the genetics of diseases in dogs and production traits in beef cattle.

== Education and career ==
Willis graduated with a BSc from Durham University in 1957 and earned his PhD in Genetics from Edinburgh University in 1960. His early career included serving as a geneticist for the Milk Marketing Board from 1960 to 1965, followed by a position as head of Animal Science at Havana University in Cuba until 1972. His research in Cuba focused on the genetics of production traits of beef cattle in tropical climates. He then joined Newcastle University, where he focused on canine genetics, particularly studying hereditary issues affecting the German Shepherd Dog and the Bernese Mountain Dog.

Willis authored several books that contributed to the field of canine genetics, including Genetics of the Dog (1989), The German Shepherd Dog: A Genetic History (1992), and The Bernese Mountain Dog Today (1998). He also initiated a hip scoring scheme in Britain that encouraged breeders to have their dogs' hips X-rayed, leading to improvements in the prevalence of hip dysplasia among puppies born after its implementation.

Willis became a dog judge in 1959, judging German Shepherd dogs and Bernese Mountain dogs in over ten countries worldwide. He was chairman of the German Shepherd Dog Breed Council since its inception in 1986 and president of the Northern Bernese Mountain Dog Club. His expertise earned him several accolades, including a Gold Medal from the Australian German Shepherd Dog Council in 1988 and the Dog Writers of America Award in 1992 for his contributions to literature on canine genetics.

Beyond his academic and literary contributions, Willis served as an advisor to law enforcement agencies regarding canine genetics and breeding issues.

== Personal life ==
Willis was married three times. His first wife was Pat, with whom he had a son; they were married in 1960 but divorced in 1968. His second wife, Thelma, whom he met while working in Cuba, was with him until their separation after having three children together. In 1990, he married his third wife, Helen Davenport, whom he had met at Crufts in 1986.

Willis died in 2011, when he was 76 years old.

== Selected publications ==
=== Books ===
- Willis, Malcolm Beverley (1998). The Bernese Mountain Dog Today. New York: Howell Book House. ISBN 978-1-58245-038-4.
- Willis, Malcolm Beverley (1992). Practical Genetics for Dog Breeders. New York : Toronto : New York: Howell Book House; Maxwell Macmillan Canada; Maxwell Macmillan International. ISBN 978-0-87605-782-7.
- Willis, Malcolm Beverley (1991). The German Shepherd Dog: a Genetic History. New York : Toronto : New York: Howell Book House; Maxwell Macmillan Canada; Maxwell Macmillan International. ISBN 978-0-87605-175-7.
- Willis, Malcolm Beverley; Dalton, Clive (1991). Dalton's Introduction to Practical Animal Breeding. Oxford; Boston: Blackwell Scientific Publications. ISBN 978-0-632-03126-9.
- Willis, Malcolm Beverley (1989). Genetics of the Dog. Arco Pub. ISBN 978-0-668-04935-1.
- Willis, Malcolm Beverley (1980). Canine Genetics: A Definitive Study. New York, N.Y: Howell Book House. ISBN 978-0-87605-551-9.
- Willis, Malcolm Beverley (1977). The German Shepherd Dog, Its History, Development, and Genetics. New York: Arco Pub. Co. ISBN 978-0-668-04077-8.
- Cooper, Malcolm McGregor; Willis, Malcolm Beverley (1972). Profitable Beef Production. Ipswich: Farming Press. ISBN 978-0-85236-023-1.
- Preston, Thomas Reginald; Willis, Malcolm Beverley (1970). Intensive Beef Production. Oxford, New York: Pergamon. ISBN 978-0-08-015652-1.

=== Journal articles ===
- Blanchard, Paul J; Willis, Malcolm B; Warkup, Chris C; Ellis, Mike (1 January 2000). "The influence of carcass backfat and intramuscular fat level on pork eating quality". Journal of the Science of Food and Agriculture. 80 (1): 145–151. Bibcode:2000JSFA...80..145B. doi:10.1002/(SICI)1097-0010(20000101)80:1<145::AID-JSFA504>3.0.CO;2-M. ISSN 0022-5142.
- Willis, Malcolm B (2000). "The Genetics of Cattle" (PDF). Heredity. 84 (1): 131–132. doi:10.1046/j.1365-2540.2000.0696b.x. ISSN 0018-067X.
- Blanchard, P. J.; Warkup, C. C.; Ellis, M.; Willis, M. B.; Avery, P. (1999). "The influence of the proportion of Duroc genes on growth, carcass and pork eating quality characteristics". Animal Science. 68 (3): 495–501. doi:10.1017/S1357729800050505. ISSN 1357-7298.
- Blanchard, P. J.; Ellis, M.; Warkup, C. C.; Chadwick, J. P.; Willis, M. B. (1999). "The influence of sex (boars and gilts) on growth, carcass and pork eating quality characteristics". Animal Science. 68 (3): 487–493. doi:10.1017/S1357729800050499. ISSN 1357-7298.
- Willis, M. B. (15 May 1997). "A review of the progress in canine hip dysplasia control in Britain". Journal of the American Veterinary Medical Association. 210 (10): 1480–1482. doi:10.2460/javma.1997.210.10.1480. ISSN 0003-1488. PMID 9154201.
- Willis, M. B. (1989). "Control of inherited defects in dogs". Journal of Small Animal Practice. 30 (3): 188–192. doi:10.1111/j.1748-5827.1989.tb01533.x. ISSN 0022-4510.
- Willis, M.; Curtis, R.; Barnett, K.; Tempest, W. (5 May 1979). "Genetic aspects of lens luxation in the Tibetan terrier". Veterinary Record. 104 (18): 409–412. doi:10.1136/vr.104.18.409. ISSN 0042-4900. PMID 314700.
- Willis, M. B.; Menchaca, M.; Preston, T. R. (1973). "The use of Brahman, Brown Swiss, Criollo, Charolais and Holstein on Zebu cows: post weaning performance and carcass characteristics". Cuban Journal of Agricultural Science. 7: 1.
- Willis, M. B.; Wood, P. D. P.; Kaspar, A. (1972). "Factors affecting body weight at birth and at 90 days of age in pure-bred and cross-bred cattle in a tropical environment". The Journal of Agricultural Science. 78 (2): 227–231. doi:10.1017/S0021859600069045. ISSN 0021-8596.
- Velázquez, M.; Preston, T. R.; Willis, M. B. (1972). "The efficiency of producing fat and lean meat in Yorkshire and Duroc Jersey pigs fed to 150 kg live weight on molasses based diets. 1. Performance to different live weights". Cuban Journal of Agricultural Science. 6: 167–172.
- Willis, M. B.; Preston, T. R. (1970). "Performance testing for beef: inter-relationships among traits in bulls tested from an early age". Animal Science. 12 (3): 451–456. doi:10.1017/S0003356100029007. ISSN 1357-7298.
- Preston, T. R.; Willis, M. B.; Martin, J. L. (1 June 1969). "Efficiency of Utilization for Fattening of the Metabolizable Energy of Molasses-Based Diets". Journal of Animal Science. 28 (6): 796–801. doi:10.2527/jas1969.286796x. ISSN 0021-8812. PMID 5356686.
- Willis, M. B.; Preston, T. R. (1968). "The performance of different breeds of beef cattle in Cuba". Animal Production. 10 (1): 77–83. doi:10.1017/S0003356100025964. ISSN 0003-3561.
- Willis, M. B.; Preston, T. R.; Martin, J. L.; Velazquez, M. (1968). "Carcass composition of Brahman bulls fed high energy diets and slaughtered at different live weights". Cuban Journal of Agricultural Science. 2: 83–93.
- Willis, M. B.; Preston, T. R. (1968). "The performance of different breeds of beef cattle in Cuba". Animal Production. 10 (1): 77–83. doi:10.1017/S0003356100025964. ISSN 0003-3561.
- Preston, T. R.; Macleod, N. A.; Lassota, L.; Willis, M. B.; Velazquez, M. (1968). "Sugar Cane Products as Energy Sources for Pigs". Nature. 219 (5155): 727–728. Bibcode:1968Natur.219..727P. doi:10.1038/219727a0. ISSN 0028-0836. PMID 5667061.
- O'Connor, L. K.; Willis, M. B. (1967). "The effect of artificial insemination on the breed structure of British Friesian cattle". Animal Science. 9 (3): 287–293. doi:10.1017/S0003356100038599. ISSN 1357-7298.
- Willis, M. B.; Preston, T. R. (1967). "Some aspects of performance–testing in the Charolais breed". Cuban Journal of Agricultural Science. 1: 21.
- Willis, M. B. (1963). "Abnormalities and Defects in Pedigree Dogs—V. Cryptorchidism". Journal of Small Animal Practice. 4 (6): 469–474. doi:10.1111/j.1748-5827.1963.tb01305.x. ISSN 0022-4510.
