= Eliseo Diego =

Cuban poet

- Cuban poet
- Born: July 2, 1920; Havana
- Died: March 1, 1994 (aged 73); Mexico City
- Education: University of Havana
- Occupations: Poet, professor
- Notable work: En la calzada de Jesús del Monte, 1949
- Awards: Máximo Gorki Award 1979 for his Spanish versions of poems by great Russian writers Premio Nacional de Literatura de Cuba 1986 International Award for Latin American and Caribbean Literature Juan Rulfo 1993
- Honours: Doctor honoris causa from the Universidad del Valle (Cali, 1992)

Eliseo Diego (July 2, 1920 – March 1, 1994) was a Cuban poet praised for his lyric poetry, and short stories. He was born in Havana and died in Mexico City. Diego, the father of writer Eliseo Alberto, won the Mexican Juan Rulfo Prize in 1993.

He published his first collection of poetry, En las Oscuras Manos del Olvido ("In the Dark Hands of Forgetting"), at 22. He was part of the Cuban literary group Origines in the 1950s. Praised as a lyric poet and writer of short stories, he was also a translator of fairy tales, and some of his poems were directly based on fairy tales. For Diego, fairy tales were also instrumental in the literacy education of the Cuban population after the 1959 Cuban Revolution.
