= Pablo Armando Fernández =

Cuban writer (1930–2021)

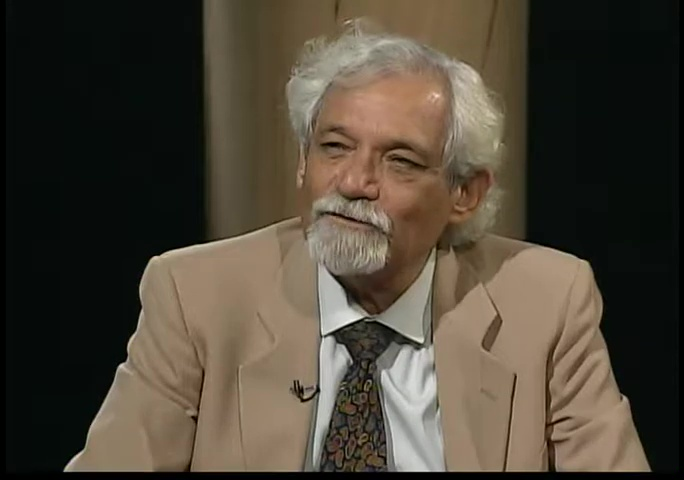
Fernández on CUNY TV's Charlando con Cervantes, 1997.

Pablo Armando Fernández (2 March 1930 – 3 November 2021) was a Cuban poet, novelist, essayist and playwright. In 1996, he was awarded the National Prize for Literature, Cuba's national literary award and most important award of its type.

== Biography ==
Born in the Oriente Province, Fernández lived in the United States from 1945 to 1959. He attended Columbia University. After the Cuban Revolution he moved back to the island. His early works were personal, but he later wrote on social matters. Fernández has been described as follows: "He has a movie poster face with a full mane of white hair and a Rasputin like goatee, like a more handsome Uncle Ben. Since his return shortly after the revolutionary victory he has been in and out of favor, then in again. Fernández has settled comfortably into a position of responsibility and respect. He is one of the OWs, the Official Writers."

== Bibliography ==
- Salterio y lamentación (1953)
- Nuevos poemas (1955)
- Himnos (1961)
- El libro de los héroes (1964)
- Campo de amor y de batalla (1984)
- El sueño, la razón (1988)
- Los niños se despiden (1963)
- El vientre del pez (1989)
- Aprendiendo a morir (1995)
