= Magda Portal =

Peruvian writer and activist (1900–1989)

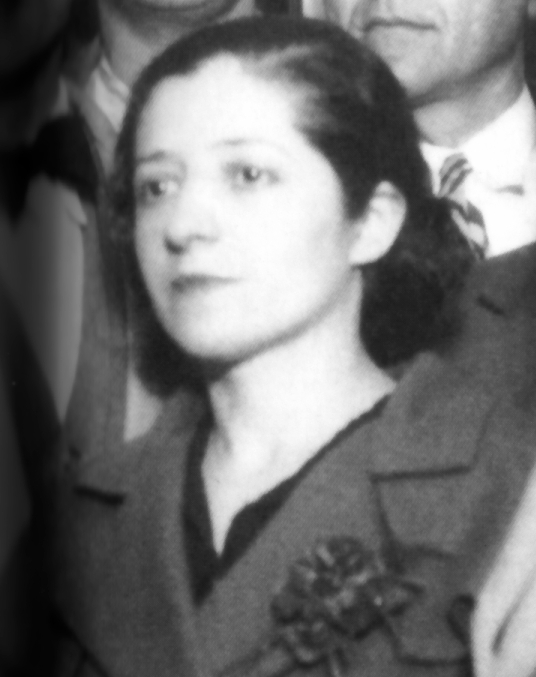
- Magda Portal c. 1930
- Born: María Magdalena Julia del Portal Moreno; May 27, 1900; Lima, Peru
- Died: July 11, 1989 (aged 89); Lima, Peru
- Occupations: Poet, novelist, essayist, feminist, political activist
- Known for: Co-founder and leader of the APRA's women's wing; early Peruvian feminist
- Notable work: Anima absorta
- Movement: Aprismo, Feminism

María Magdalena Julia del Portal Moreno (May 27, 1900 – 1989) was a Peruvian poet, feminist, author, and political activist and leader. She was recognized in the vanguardia poetry literary movement in Peru and Latin America, and she was one of the founders of the APRA (American Popular Revolutionary Alliance) political party.

== Early life ==
Magda Portal was born on May 27, 1900, in Barranco, near Lima, Peru. As a young woman, she worked during the day, and attended classes at the University of San Marcos during the evening. These classes broadened her views on philosophical and political ideals. During this stage of her life as a young woman, she began her literary career by writing poetry and reporting for magazines. In 1923, Portal was recognized by the prestigious Juegos Florales poetry competition. However, Portal refused to accept the prize when she heard Augusto Leguia, the Peruvian president was to announce and award the prize to her. This was a definitive move in her career, and perhaps marked the beginning of Portal's political career.

== Political career ==
Portal continued to write extensively after this poetry competition in 1923. On November 11, 1923, she gave birth to her daughter, Gloria. When Portal returned to Peru after a trip to Bolivia, she became actively involved in progressive politics and the active literary scene in Lima, Peru. In June 1927, her role in progressive politics made her one of the many people the regime of Augusto Leguía exiled for allegedly participating in communist organizations. After she was exiled, she traveled first to Cuba and then to Mexico. While in Mexico, she met Haya de la Torre, the Peruvian founder of the Alianza Popular Revolucionaria Americana (APRA) movement, who recruited her to the Aprista movement. She then became the cofounder, along with many others, of the Aprista party in 1931. At this time Portal began to focus more on politics than poetry and she became a committed anti-imperialist. Portal traveled all over Latin America promoting these anti-imperialist and Aprista ideals, proving herself as a political leader.

In 1930 Portal traveled to Chile, but was imprisoned and placed into solitary confinement. Later that year after President Leguía's regime fell, Portal finally returned to Peru where she was appointed to the task of organizing women's Aprista groups throughout Peru by the Aprista party's national executive committee, which Portal was a member of. She continued in her work by assisting with the party magazine, Apra, and by publishing and editing various propaganda pamphlets. The government of Luis Miguel Sánchez Cerro followed Leguía's regime, whose goal was to eliminate the Aprista movement and his administration persistently persecuted them. This persecution forced Portal and many other Apra members to live clandestinely and continue with Apra work illegally.

In 1933, Sánchez Cerro was assassinated by an Aprista militant, leading to Oscar Benavides becoming his successor as President. The same year, Portal was named the National Secretary of Women's Affair for the Aprista party. In this leadership position Portal traveled around Peru and eventually was imprisoned once again. When she finally received her freedom in 1936, Portal travelled to Bolivia, then to Argentina, and onwards to Chile. In 1945, Portal returned to Peru. Her opinions on the Aprista party's ideals began to differ from the others, and felt betrayed by the party. In 1950, she publicly broke from the Aprista party, after feeling that the party had strayed from its original and anti-imperialist goals. She continued her activist role, however, and continued to advocate strongly for women's rights throughout the 1970s.

== Literary accomplishments ==
By the 1970s and 1980s, Portal's literary accomplishments began receiving increased critical attention. Portal had begun her writing in the 1920s. She was a recognized leader in the vanguardia literary movement. She wrote and published poetry, books, and newspaper and magazine articles all over South America, many of which conveyed her progressive views on women's rights. In 1980 Portal was elected the president of the Asociación Nacional de Escritores y Artistas and is still remembered as a literary leader in Latin America. Portal died in 1989.

Portal's personal and literary archive was purchased by the Benson Latin American Collection in 1986.

== Selected works ==
- Una Esperanza y El Mar. 1927
- Flora Tristan, Precursora. 1944
- Costa Sur. 1945
- Constancia del Ser. 1955
- La Trampa. 1957

== Sources ==
- Flores, Angel. Spanish American Authors: The Twentieth Century. New York: HW Wilson, 1992.
- Klarén, Peter Flindell. Peru: Society and Nationhood in the Andes. Oxford: Oxford University Press, 2000.
- Portaro, Iliana. Escritoras vanguardistas: la utilización de géneros menores y la prensa escrita peruana a principios del siglo XX. Doctoral diss., University of California, Davis, 2013.
- Reedy, Daniel R. Spanish American Women Writers: A Bio-Biographical Source Book. Diane E. Marting, ed. Connecticut: Greenwood, 1990.
- Smith, Myriam Gonzales. Poética e Ideología en Magda Portal: Otras Dimensiones de la Vanguardia en Latinoamérica. Lima: Instituto de Estudios Peruanos, 2007.
- Wallace Fuentes, Myrna Ivonne. "Becoming Magda Portal: Poetry, Gender, and Revolutionary Politics in Lima, Peru, 1920-1930," PhD dissertation, History, Duke University, Durham, NC, 2006.
- Wallace Fuentes, Myrna Ivonne. Most Scandalous Woman: Magda Portal and the Dream of Revolution in Peru. University of Oklahoma Press, 2017.
- Weaver, Kathleen. Peruvian Rebel: The World of Magda Portal, with Selected Poems. Penn State University Press, forthcoming.
