= Cintio Vitier =

Cuban poet, essayist, and novelist (1921–2009)

- Born: September 25, 1921; Key West, Florida
- Died: October 1, 2009 (aged 88); Havana, Cuba
- Occupations: Poet, essayist
- Spouse: Fina García Marruz
- Children: Sergio Vitier José María Vitier
- Writing career
- Notable awards: Juan Rulfo Prize, National Prize for Literature

Cintio Vitier (September 25, 1921 – October 1, 2009) was a Cuban poet, essayist, and novelist. Upon selecting him for the Juan Rulfo Prize, the award jury called him "one of the most important writers of his generation".

== Early life ==
Cintio Vitier was born to Medardo and María Cristina Bolaños Vitier on September 25, 1921, in Key West, Florida, United States, but had Cuban nationality. Vitier attended a school started by his father in Matanzas, Cuba. He said that the school's library inspired his early literary inspiration. At fifteen, Vitier moved with his family to Havana and attended La Luz, a private school, and later a public secondary school. In 1947, he graduated as an attorney from the University of Havana.

Vitier founded the journal Luz, allowing him to publish his work. At 17, he published Poemas, a book of his poetry. Poet Juan Ramón Jiménez, who was in exile at the time, wrote the introduction and chose the poems.

== Career ==
Vitier began as a writer of hermetic poetry. Other themes in his poetry included the nature of poetry, the function of memory, and the role of language in the creative process. After Fidel Castro's revolution, critics said that Vitier captured the spirit of the revolution without resorting to propaganda.

Vitier helped start the Cuban poetry magazine Orígenes. Among his works are the books of poetry: Extrañeza de estar ("The wonder of being", 1944); Vísperas ("Vespers", 1953); Canto llano ("Plain song", 1956); Testimonios (1968), an anthology of his works from 1953 to 1968; La fecha al pie (1981), covering his works from 1969 to 1975; Antología poética (1981); and Poemas de mayo a junio (1990).

The most prominent of his works on Cuban poetry are Cincuenta años de poesía cubana, 1902–1952 ("Fifty years of Cuban poetry, 1902–1952"), Lo cubano en la poesía ("The Cuban element in poetry", 1958), as well as the novel Peña Pobre.

Vitier won the National Prize for Literature (1988), the Order of José Marti awarded by the Cuban Council of State, the Juan Rulfo Prize (2002), and the medal of the Cuban Academy of Sciences. He also received the title of Official of Arts and Letters of France.

== Family and later life ==
Vitier's son is Sergio Vitier one of the most important composers in Latin America and Jose Maria Vitier a well-known composer.

To celebrate his last birthday, a bibliographic exhibition was opened at the Cuban National Library.

Vitier died on October 1, 2009, at the age of 88 in Havana. He had made an appearance the week before with his wife, poet Fina García Marruz. His death was first reported by local television stations without additional details. Fidel and Raúl Castro sent floral wreaths dedicated to Vitier.

== Works in English ==
In June 2013, José Martí, Cuban Apostle: A Dialogue, was published by I.B Tauris of London. In the book, Vitier and Japanese writer Daisaku Ikeda explore the life, work and influence of José Martí (1853–1895) the Cuban independence hero, and discuss the nature of sacrifice for the sake of a great cause. Vitier and Ikeda met in Havana and in Tokyo, Japan, and their dialogue was initially serialized in Ushio, a Japanese literary magazine, between June 1999 and April 2000. The Japanese edition of their discussions was compiled and published as a book in August 2001, and Diálogo sobre José Martí, el Apóstol de Cuba, the Spanish edition, was published in Cuba in October 2001 and in the Dominican Republic in May 2002.
