= Fina García Marruz =

Cuban poet and literary researcher (1923–2022)

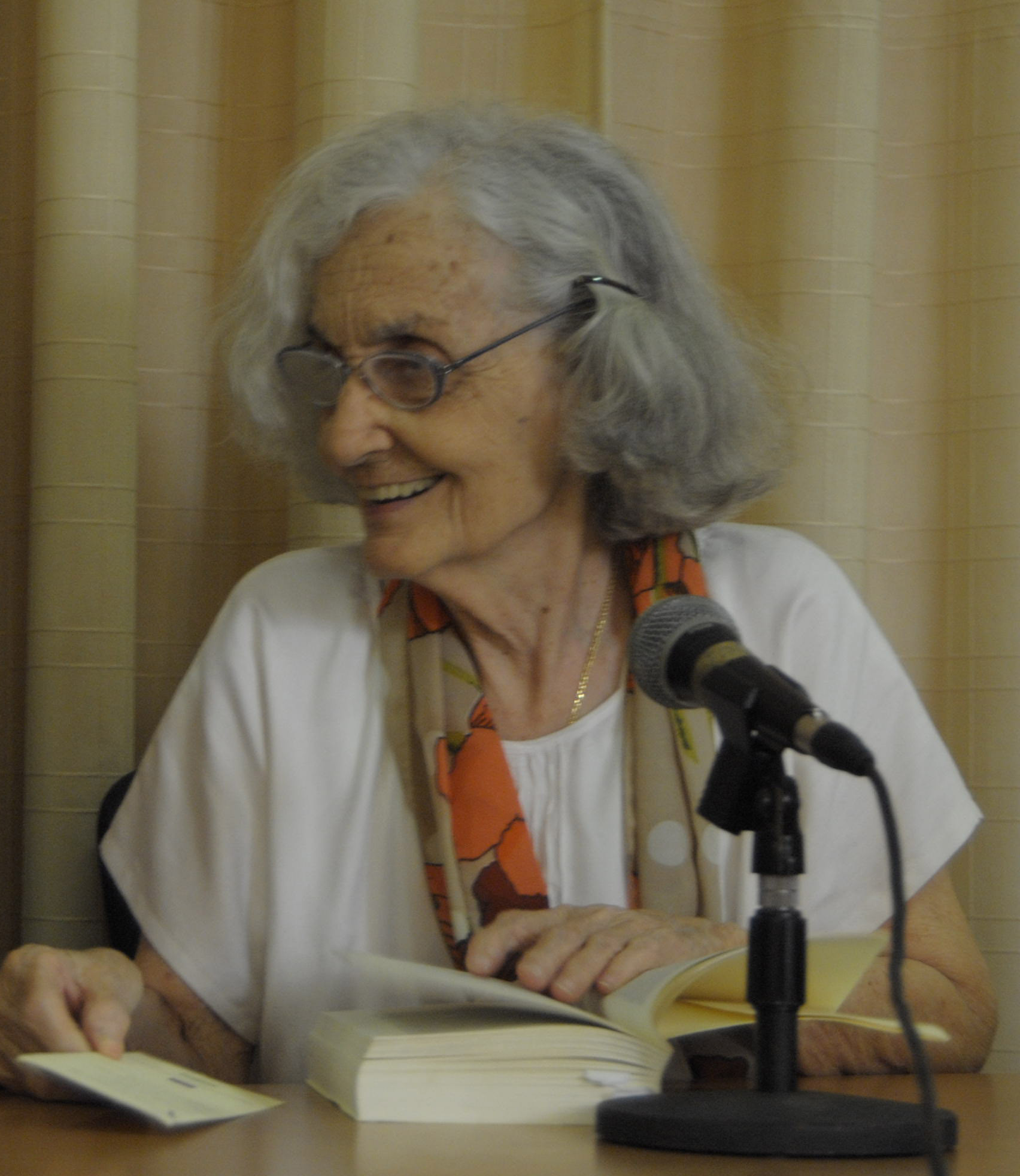
García-Marruz in 2010

Josefina García-Marruz Badía (28 April 1923 – 27 June 2022), known artistically as Fina García Marruz, was a Cuban poet and literary researcher.

== Life ==
García Marruz was born in Havana on 28 April 1923. She received numerous awards, including the National Prize for Literature (1990), Pablo Neruda Ibero-American Poetry Award (2007), and the Reina Sofía de Poesía Iberoamericana (2011). García Marruz died on 27 June 2022, at the age of 99.

== Selected works ==
=== Poetry ===
- Poemas, 1942
- Transfiguración de Jesús en el Monte, Orígenes, 1947
- Las miradas perdidas 1944–1950, 1951
- Visitaciones, 1970
- Poesías escogidas, Letras Cubanas, 1984
- Viaje a Nicaragua, with Cintio Vitier, 1987
- Créditos de Charlot, 1990
- Los Rembrandt de l'Hermitage, 1992
- Viejas melodías, 1993
- Nociones elementales y algunas elegías, 1994
- Habana del centro, 1997
- Antología poética, 1997
- Poesía escogida, with Cintio Vitier, 1999
- El instante raro, Pre-Textos, 2010
- ¿De qué, silencio, eres tú, silencio?, 2011

=== Essays and critiques ===
- Estudios críticos, with Cintio Vitier, 1964
- Poesías de Juana Borrero, 1967
- Los versos de Martí, 1968
- Temas martianos, with Cintio Vitier, 1969
- Bécquer o la leve bruma, 1971
- Poesías y cartas, with Cintio Vitier, 1977
- Flor oculta de poesía cubana, with Cintio Vitier, 1978
- Temas martianos, segunda serie, 1982
- Hablar de la poesía, Letras Cubanas, 1986
- Textos antimperialistas de José Martí, 1990
- La literatura en el Papel Periódico de La Habana, with Cintio Vitier and Roberto Friol, 1991
- Temas martianos, tercera serie, 1993
- La familia de "Orígenes", 1997
- Darío, Martí y lo germinal americano, 2001
- Juana Borrero y otros ensayos, 2011

== Awards ==
=== Prizes ===
- Premio de la Crítica Literaria 1987 for Hablar de la poesía
- Premio Nacional de Literatura de Cuba 1990.
- Premio de la Crítica Literaria 1991 for Créditos de Charlot
- Premio de la Crítica Literaria 1992 for Los Rembrandt de l'Hermitage
- Premio de la Crítica Literaria 1996 for Habana del centro
- Premio de la Crítica Literaria 2001 for Darío, Martí y lo germinal americano
- Premio Nacional de Investigación Cultural 2005
- Pablo Neruda Ibero-American Poetry Award 2007
- Premio Reina Sofía de Poesía Iberoamericana 2011
- Premio Internacional de Poesía Federico García Lorca 2011

=== Distinctions ===
- Orden Alejo Carpentier, 1988
- Orden Félix Varela, 1995
- Medalla 30 aniversario de la Academia de Ciencias de Cuba
- Medalla Fernando Ortiz
- Distinción, Cultura Nacional
- Distinción, Raúl Gómez García
- Distinción 23 de agosto, Federación de Mujeres Cubanas
- Hija Adoptiva de Bayamo
- Orden José Martí
