= Nicolás Guillén =

Cuban poet, journalist and political activist (1902–1989)

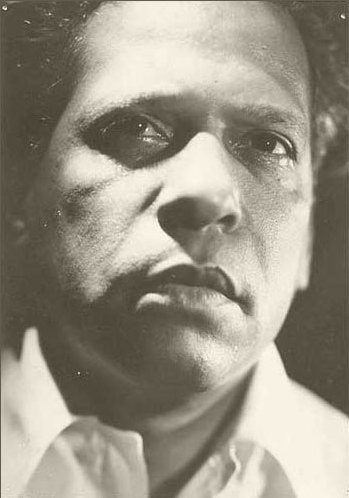
- Born: July 10, 1902; Camagüey, Cuba
- Died: July 16, 1989 (aged 87); Havana, Cuba
- Education: University of Havana
- Occupations: Poet, journalist and political activist
- Writing career
- Genre: Poetry
- Subject: Black poetry (poesía negra)
- Notable awards: National Prize for Literature

Nicolás Cristóbal Guillén Batista (10 July 1902 – 16 July 1989) was a Cuban poet, journalist and political activist. He is best remembered as the national poet of Cuba.

Born in Camagüey, Cuba, he studied law at the University of Havana, but abandoned a legal career and worked as both a typographer and journalist. His poetry was published in various magazines from the early 1920s; his first collection, Motivos de son (1930) was strongly influenced by his meeting that year with the African-American poet, Langston Hughes. He drew from son music in his poetry. West Indies, Ltd., published in 1934, was Guillén's first collection with political implications. Cuba's dictatorial Gerardo Machado regime was overthrown in 1933, but political repression intensified. After being jailed in 1936, Guillén joined the Communist Party the next year, traveling to Spain for a Congress of Writers and Artists, and covering the Spanish Civil War as a magazine reporter.

After returning to Cuba, he stood as a Communist in the local elections of 1940. This caused him to be refused a visa to enter the United States the following year, but he traveled widely during the next decades in South America, China and Europe. In 1953, after being in Chile, he was refused re-entry to Cuba and spent five years in exile. He returned after the successful Cuban revolution of 1959. From 1961, he served more than 30 years as president of the Unión Nacional de Escritores de Cuba, the National Cuban Writers' Union. His awards included the Stalin Peace Prize in 1954, the 1976 International Botev Prize, and in 1983 he was the inaugural winner of Cuba's National Prize for Literature. His great grandson Manuel de Jesús Guillén Esplugas who protested the Cuban regime during the 2021 11th of July protests was murdered in police custody in 2024 during his 6 year sentence at 29 years old.

== Early life ==
Nicolás Guillén Batista was born July 10, 1902, in Camagüey, Cuba, the eldest of six children (three boys and three girls) of Argelia Batista y Arrieta and Nicolás Guillén y Urra, both of whom were of mixed-race, African-European descent. His father had fought for independence as a lieutenant. When his first son Nicolás was born, the father worked as a journalist for one of the new local papers. He introduced his son to Afro-Cuban music when he was very young. Guillén y Urra belonged to the Partido Libertad and founded the daily newspaper, La Libertad, to express its views. Government forces assassinated Guillén's father for protesting against electoral fraud and destroyed his printing press, where Nicolás and a brother were already working. Argelia and her children struggled financially. Nicolás and his siblings encountered discriminatory racism in Cuba similar to that suffered by African Americans in the United States.

== Literary works ==
Guillén drew from his mixed African and Spanish ancestry and education to combine his knowledge of traditional literary form with firsthand experience of the speech, legends, songs, and songs of Afro-Cubans in his first volume of poetry, Motivos de son. It was soon acclaimed as a masterpiece and widely imitated. In the 1920s, when Afro-Cuban sounds and instruments were changing the world of Cuban music, Afro-Cuban culture began to be expressed in art and literature as well. Initially, Afro-Cuban poetry, or "negrista" poetry, was mainly published by European Cubans such as Emilio Ballagas, Alejo Carpentier, and José Tallet. It was not until the 1930s that Guillén would appeal in literary terms by expressing a personal account of the struggles, dreams, and mannerisms of Afro-Cubans.

Guillén became outspoken politically, and dissatisfied with picturesque portrayal of the daily life of the poor. He began to decry their oppression in his poetry volumes Sóngoro cosongo and West Indies Ltd. Guillen also wrote Cantos para soldados y sones para turistas, which reflected his growing political commitment. Guillén is probably the best-known representative of the "poesía negra" ("black poetry"), which tried to create a synthesis between black and white cultural elements, a "poetic mestizaje". Characteristic for his poems is the use of onomatopoetic words ("Sóngoro Cosongo", "Mayombe-bombe") that try to imitate the sound of drums or the rhythm of the son. Silvestre Revueltas's symphonic composition Sensemayá was based on Guillén's poem of the same name, and became that composer's best-known work, followed by José Limantour's suite from his film score for La noche de los mayas.

Guillén later became acknowledged by many critics as the most influential of those Latin American poets who dealt with African themes and re-created African song and dance rhythms in literary form. Guillen made an international mark with the publication of Motivos de son (1930). The work was inspired by the living conditions of Afro-Cubans and the popular son music. The work consists of eight short poems using the everyday language of the Afro Cubans. The collection stood out in the literary world because it emphasized and established the importance of Afro-Cuban culture as a valid genre in Cuban literature.

In Man-Making Words: Selected Poems of Nicolás Guillén, Angel Aguier, in reference to Motivos de son, wrote that

"the 'son,' a passionate dance born of the Negro-white encounter under Caribbean skies in which the words and music of the people culminate in song, is the basic substance of the elemental poetry which Guillen intuitively felt as the expression of the Cuban spirit.... He specifically chose the son as the mixed artistic creation of the two races that make up the Cuban population; for the son, in form and content, runs the full gamut of every aspect of our national character."

This quote establishes how the son, such a profound musical genre of that time, initiated the fusion of black and white Cuban culture. Guillén's incorporation of the genre into his writings, symbolized and created a pathway for the same cultural fusion in Cuban literature.

Guillén's unique approach of using the son in his poetry is expressed in his book Sóngoro consongo (1931). In this work, he included poems that depicted the lives of Cubans and emphasized the importance of Afro-Cuban culture in Cuban history. Sóngoro consongo captures the essence of the Afro-Cuban culture and ways that the people deal with their personal situations.

Guillén's poem, "Motivos de son", from Sóngoro consongo, is a fusion of West African and Hispanic literary styles, contributing to his unique literary vision.

"La canción del bongó", like many poems in Sóngoro consongo, incorporates the rhythmic sounds of son. The poem has a rhythm that uses the marking of stressed and unstressed syllables in strong and weak beats, rather than simply the number of syllables. Dellita L. Martin says that "La canción del bongó" stands out as a poem because "it is the only one to indicate Guillén's painfully increasing awareness of racial conflicts in Cuba".

== Langston Hughes and Nicolás Guillén ==
In 1930, José Antonio Fernández de Castro, publisher of the Havana daily paper, Diario de la Marina, and the first to translate American Langston Hughes’s poetry to Spanish, arranged for the two poets to meet. He was a white Cuban from an aristocratic family who loved black Cuba. He was a newspaperman, a diplomat, and a friend to Cuba’s artists.

In February 1930, Langston Hughes traveled to Cuba for the second time, on a two-week mission to find a black composer to collaborate on a folk opera. He had been given a letter of introduction to José Antonio Fernández de Castro, his door to Cuba’s artistic world. At this time Hughes’ poetry was better known to Cubans than that of Guillén, so the American's arrival created a stir in the artistic community. The next month, on 9 March 1930, Guillén published “Conversación con Langston Hughes”, an article describing his experience of meeting Hughes in Havana. The Cubans expected a nearly white, tall and heavyset man in his forties with thin lips and an even thinner English-style mustache. Instead they saw a twenty-seven-year-old, slight brown man without a mustache. Guillén wrote that Mr. Hughes "parece justamente un mulatico cubano” – looks just like a Cuban mulatto.

Guillén was especially taken with Hughes' warm personality and enthusiasm for the "son" music, which he heard on the nightly forays into Cuba's Marinao district organized by Fernandez de Castro. Hughes was said to be a hit with the soneros. His enthusiasm for Cuban music inspired Guillén. Hughes immediately saw the similarities between son and the blues, as folk music traditions whose form was based on the call-and-response structure of African music. Additionally, he was excited about its possibilities as an organic base for formal poetry. According to biographer Arnold Rampersad, Hughes suggested to Guillén that he make the rhythms of the son central to his poetry, as the American had used elements of blues and jazz.

Hughes drew not only rhythmic innovation from these folk music traditions, but used them as a means to express his protest against racial inequality. Both poets shared anger against racism, but Hughes impressed Guillén with his particular kind of racial consciousness. Although the Cuban poet had expressed outrage against racism and economic imperialism, he had not yet done so in language inspired by Afro-Cuban speech, song, and dance. He had been more concerned with protest than with celebrating the power and beauty of Afro Cubans.

Within weeks of meeting Hughes, Guillén quickly wrote eight poems that were markedly different from his previous work. His new poems generated controversy and established Guillén's fame as one of the premier poets of the Négritude movement, which spanned the Americas. On 21 April 1930, Guillén sent Hughes the result of his inspiration, his book of poetry Motivos de Son. The author wrote on the inside cover, “Al poeta Langston Hughes, querido amigo mío. Afectuosamente, Nicolás Guillén”. Although Hughes did not find an Afro-Cuban composer to work with, he created a lasting friendship with Guillén; it was based on their mutual respect and convictions about racial inequality.

== Poetry and politics ==
Cuba's dictatorial Gerardo Machado regime was overthrown in 1933, but political repression in the following years intensified. In 1936, with other editors of Mediodía, Guillén was arrested on trumped-up charges, and spent some time in jail. In 1937 he joined the Communist Party and made his first trip abroad in July 1937 to attend the Second International Writers' Congress, the purpose of which was to discuss the attitude of intellectuals to the war in Spain, held in Valencia, Barcelona and Madrid and attended by many writers including André Malraux, Ernest Hemingway, Stephen Spender and Pablo Neruda. During his travels in the country, he covered Spain's Civil War as a magazine reporter.

Guillén returned to Cuba via Guadeloupe. He stood as a Communist in the local elections of 1940. The following year he was refused a visa to enter the United States, but he travelled widely during the next two decades in South America, China and Europe.

Guillén's poetry was increasingly becoming imbued with issues of cross-cultural Marxist dialectic. In 1953, he was prevented by the Fulgencio Batista government from re-entering Cuba after a trip to Chile and had to spend five years in exile.

After the Cuban revolution of 1959, Guillen was welcomed back by Fidel Castro, the new president. In 1961 he was appointed as president of the Unión Nacional de Escritores de Cuba, the National Cuban Writers' Union, serving for more than 25 years. He continued to write evocative and poignant poetry highlighting social conditions, such as "Problemas de Subdesarrollo" and "Dos Niños" (Two Children). He was considered the national poet of Cuba, who drew from its multicultural history and population for inspiration.

Nicolás Guillén died in 1989, aged 87, of Parkinson's disease. He was buried in the Colon Cemetery, Havana.

== Legacy and honors ==
- In 1954, Guillén was awarded the Stalin Peace Prize (it was later renamed for Lenin under de-Stalinization).
- In 1974, the Institute of Jamaica awarded Guillén the Musgrave Medal, literature.
- 1976, he was awarded the International Botev Prize.
- In 1983, he was the inaugural winner of Cuba's National Prize for Literature.
- His nephew was experimental Cuban filmmaker Nicolás Guillén Landrián (1938–2003).

== Major works ==
- Motivos de son (1930)
- Sóngoro cosongo (1931)
- West Indies Ltd. (1934)
- España: poema en cuatro angustias y una esperanza (1937)
- Cantos para soldados y sones para turistas (1937)
- El son entero (1947)
- Cuba libré (1948), in English, poetry collection, tr. Langston Hughes, Ben Frederic Carruthers
- Elegías (1948–1958)
- Tengo (1964)
- Poemas de amor (1964)
- El gran zoo (1967)
- La rueda dentada (1972)
- El diario que a diario (1972)
- Man-making words (1972) Selected poems of Nicolás Guillén. Translated, annotated ... by Robert Márquez and David Arthur McMurray.
- Por el mar de las Antillas anda un barco de papel. Poemas para niños y mayores de edad (1977)
- Yoruba from Cuba: Selected Poems of Nicolas Guillen (trans. Salvador Ortiz-Carboneres; Peepal Tree Press, 2005)
- Libre estoy, vine de lejos, soy un negro. Antología poética (2019) (selección y prólogo de Nicolás Guillén Hernández).

=== Discography ===
- Antologia Oral: Poesia Hispanoamericana del Siglo XX / Oral Anthology: Spanish-American Poetry of the 20th Century (Folkways Records, 1960)
- Nicolás Guillén: Poet Laureate of Revolutionary Cuba (Folkways, 1982)

== See also ==
- Négritude
- Nicolás Guillén Landrián
- Cuban literature
- Caribbean poetry
