= Roberto Fernández Retamar =

Cuban poet, essayist and literary critic

Roberto Fernández Retamar (9 June 1930 – 20 July 2019, Havana) was a Cuban poet, essayist, literary critic and President of the Casa de las Américas. In his role as President of the organization, Fernández also served on the Council of State of Cuba. An early close confidant of Che Guevara and Fidel Castro, he was a central figure in Cuba from the 1959 Revolution until his death in 2019. Fernández also wrote over a dozen major collections of verse and founded the Casa de las Americas cultural magazine.

Professor Joao Cesar Castro de Rocha, at the University of Manchester has described Retamar as "one of the most distinguished Latin American intellectuals of the twentieth century." In 1989, he was awarded the National Prize for Literature, Cuba's national literary award and most important award of its type.

== On Caliban ==
Responding to the arielismo of José Enrique Rodó, who used the Shakespearean character Caliban as a metaphor for Latin American civilisation, Retamar in 1971 influentially set up instead Caliban as a symbol of the Cuban people, stating that: "Our symbol is not Ariel, as Rodó thought, but Caliban….I know no other metaphor more expressive of our cultural situation, of our reality".

== Works ==
Poetry
Elegía como un himno, Havana, 1950
Patrias. 1949-1951, Havana, 1952
Alabanzas, conversaciones. 1951-1955, Mexico, 1955
Vuelta de la antigua esperanza, Havana, 1959
En su lugar, la poesía, Havana, 1959
Con las mismas manos. 1949-1962, Havana, 1962
Historia antigua, Havana, 1964
Poesía reunida. 1948-1965, Havana, 1966
Buena suerte viviendo, Mexico, 1967
Que veremos arder, havana, 1970. Published in Spain with the title Algo semejante a los monstruos antediluvianos
A quien pueda interesar (Poesía 1958-1970), Mexico
Cuaderno paralelo, Havana, 1973
Circunstancia de poesía, Buenos Aires, 1974
Revolución nuestra, amor nuestro, Havana, 1976
Palabra de mi pueblo. Poesía 1949-1979, Havana, 1980
Circunstancia y Juana, México, 1980 (consta de Circunstancia de poesía y Juana y otros poemas personales)
Juana y otros poemas personales, Managua, 1981
Poeta en La Habana, Barcelona, 1982
Hacia la nueva, Havana, 1989
Hemos construido una alegría olvidada. Poesías escogidas (1949-1988), Madrid, 1989
Mi hija mayor va a Buenos Aires, Havana, 1993
Algo semejante a los monstruos antediluvianos. Poesías escogidas 1949-1988, Havana, 1994
Las cosas del corazón, Havana, 1994
Una salva de porvenir, Matanzas, Cuba, 1995
Aquí, Caracas, 1995
Esta especie de poema. Antología poética, Puerto Rico, 1999
Versos, Havana, 1999.
Felices los normales. Poesías escogidas 1994-1999, Mexico, 2002.
De una pluma de faisán. Poetas en mis poemas, Córdoba (Spain), 2004.
Antología personal, Mexico, 2004.
Nuestro fuego, Lima, 2006.
Cinco poemas griegos, Havana, 2006.
Lo que va dictando el fuego, Caracas, 2008.
Conversa. Antoloxía 1951-1996, Vigo, 2009.
Nosotros los sobrevivientes. Antología poética, Santiago de Chile, 2010.
Vuelta de la antigua esperanza, Havana, 2010.
Una salva de porvenir. Nueva antología personal, Buenos Aires, 2012.
Circonstances de la poésie, París, 2014.
Historia antigua, Havana, 2015.

Essay
La poesía contemporánea en Cuba. 1927-1953, Havana, 1954
Idea de la estilística, Havana, 1983
Papelería, Universidad Central de Las Villas, 1962
Ensayo de otro mundo, Havana, 1967
Introducción a Cuba. Historia, Havana, 1968
Calibán, Mexico, 1971
El son de vuelo popular, Havana, 1972
Lectura de Martí, Mexico, 1972
Para una teoría de la literatura hispanoamericana, Havana, 1975
Acerca de España. Contra la Leyenda Negra, Medellín, 1977
Introducción a José Martí, Havana, 1978
Algunos problemas teóricos de la literatura hispanoamericana, Cuenca, 1981
Para el perfil definitivo del hombre (prólogo de Abel Prieto), Havana, 1981
Entrevisto, Havana, 1982
José Martí: semblanza biográfica y cronología mínima (con Ibrahím Hidalgo Paz), Havana, 1982
Naturalidad y modernidad en la literatura martiana, Montevideo, 1986
Algunos usos de civilización y barbarie, Buenos Aires, 1989
Ante el Quinto Centenario, 1992

José Martí. La encarnación de un pueblo, Buenos Aires, 1993

Cuando un poeta muere, Matanzas, Cuba, 1994
Nuestra América: cien años, y otros acercamientos a Martí, Havana, 1995
Cuba defendida, Havana, 1996
Recuerdo a, Havana, 1998
La poesía, reino autónomo, Havana, 2000

== See also ==
- José Martí

== Bibliography ==
- ‘’Caliban and Other Essays’’ (Minneapolis 1989)
- Todo caliban San Juan, PR: Ediciones Callejon, 2002. ISBN 1-881748-11-1
