= Oscar Hurtado =

Cuban writer and journalist

Oscar Hurtado (1919–1977) was a Cuban writer and journalist. He was born in Havana on August 8, 1919 and died on January 23, 1977. He was the son and grandson of fishermen, taught by his mother to read from age 2. Considered the father of Cuban science fiction, he might also be called the father of fantasy, police and horror literature on the Caribbean island. He has stood out as a writer not only for his work in these genres (although he cultivated almost all of them) but for his outreach work as well.

== Education and career ==
As a young man Hurtado traveled to the United States where he worked at various jobs before returning to Cuba in 1959. In 1962 he traveled to the then Soviet Union. There he met Alexander Kasántsev, among other scientists and science fiction writers.

He created and directed the legendary Dragon collection, the first brand of Cuban released police, fantasy and science fiction literature, in the island. He allowed Cubans to become acquainted with worldwide classics such as Ray Bradbury, Isaac Asimov, Arthur Conan Doyle and CS Lewis.

He also founded the Fénix (Phoenix) Collections which were dedicated to promoting Cuban poetry and Cuadernos R (R Notebooks) which fulfilled the same function for prose. He published the poetry collections La Seiba (The Ceiba) in 1961, La ciudad muerta de Korad (The dead city of Korad) in 1964 and Paseo del Malecón (Malecon Path) in 1965. He also published the storybook Carta de un juez (Letter from a judge) in 1963. He co-authored, with Evora Tamayo of Cuba, Cien años de humor político (100 years of political humour). He also published an essay on Cuban painting, Pintores Cubanos in 1962 and several articles about arts, broadcasting, aerospace, chess, science fiction, and other archaeological mysteries.

He wrote the prefaces of the first Cuban editions of The War of the Worlds by H. G. Wells and The Adventures of Sherlock Holmes by Arthur Conan Doyle. He also compiled and prefaced Cuentos de ciencia ficción (Science fiction tales), published in 1969, which featured Cuban and foreign authors.

After his death, almost all his work - including some unpublished stories - were collected in the volume Los papeles de Valencia el Mudo (The Valencia el Mudo papers). The writer Daína Chaviano, compiler and foreword writer of that volume later founded the first literary workshop in Cuba dedicated to science fiction, which she called Oscar Hurtado as a posthumous tribute to the author.

== Main works ==
- 1961: La Seiba (Poetry) - The Ceiba
- 1962: Pintores cubanos (Essay) - Cuban Painters
- 1964: La ciudad muerta de Korad (Poetry) - The Dead City of Korad
- 1965: Paseo del Malecón - Malecon Path
- 1963: Carta de un juez (Stories) - Letter from a Judge
- 1983: Los papeles de Valencia el Mudo (Posthumous Anthology) - The Valencia el Mudo papers

== Sources ==
- Information taken from the Introduction to Los papeles de Valencia el Mudo, by Daína Chaviano, which compiles nearly all of Hurtado's work (Radar Collection № 47, Editorial Letras Cubanas, 1983).
