= Academia Cubana de la Lengua =

Spanish language association in Cuba

The Academia Cubana de la Lengua (Spanish for Cuban Academy of Language) is an association of academics and experts on the use of the Spanish language in Cuba. It was founded in Havana, on May 19, 1926. It is a member of the Association of Spanish Language Academies.
