= Casa de las Américas =

Organization founded by the Cuban Government in 1959

Main building of the Casa de las Américas in Vedado/Havana

Casa de las Américas is an organization that was founded by the Cuban Government in April 1959, four months after the Cuban Revolution, for the purpose of developing and extending the socio-cultural relations with the countries of Latin America, the Caribbean and the rest of the world. Originally a publishing house and information center, it has developed into the best-known and most prestigious cultural institution in Cuba. The organization awards the Casa de las Américas Prize, in several literary categories, and its official journal, Casa de las Américas, has been published since 1961.

== History ==
The organization was founded by Haydée Santamaría, a member of the 26th of July Movement and one of the few women directly involved in the revolutionary brigades. Under her leadership, it became over the next two decades a physical and cultural refuge for artists and writers who had been persecuted in their homelands for their advocacy of social justice and opposition to military dictatorship.

The organization awards the Casa de las Américas Prize, one of the oldest and most prestigious prizes in Latin American literature. It also researches, supports, and publishes the work of writers, sculptors, musicians, and other artists and students of literature and the arts. Its official organ is the journal Casa de las Américas, published since 1961. The journal began as a literary magazine but has since become a general intellectual review with an equal focus on history and international politics. It also publishes Boletín, a journal specializing in Latin American music, Criterios, devoted to theory and criticism, and Anales de Caribe, a scholarly journal for Caribbean specialists in all disciplines.

Following Santamaría's death in 1980, Casa de las Américas was led by the painter Mariano Rodriguez (1912–1990). From 1986 until 2019, its President was poet and essayist Roberto Fernández Retamar (1930–2019). Abel Prieto Jiménez (b. 1950) assumed the presidency after Retamar's death.
