= University of Havana =

University located in the Vedado district of Havana, Cuba

Coordinates: 23°8′3.49″N 82°22′55.32″W

- Universidad de la Habana
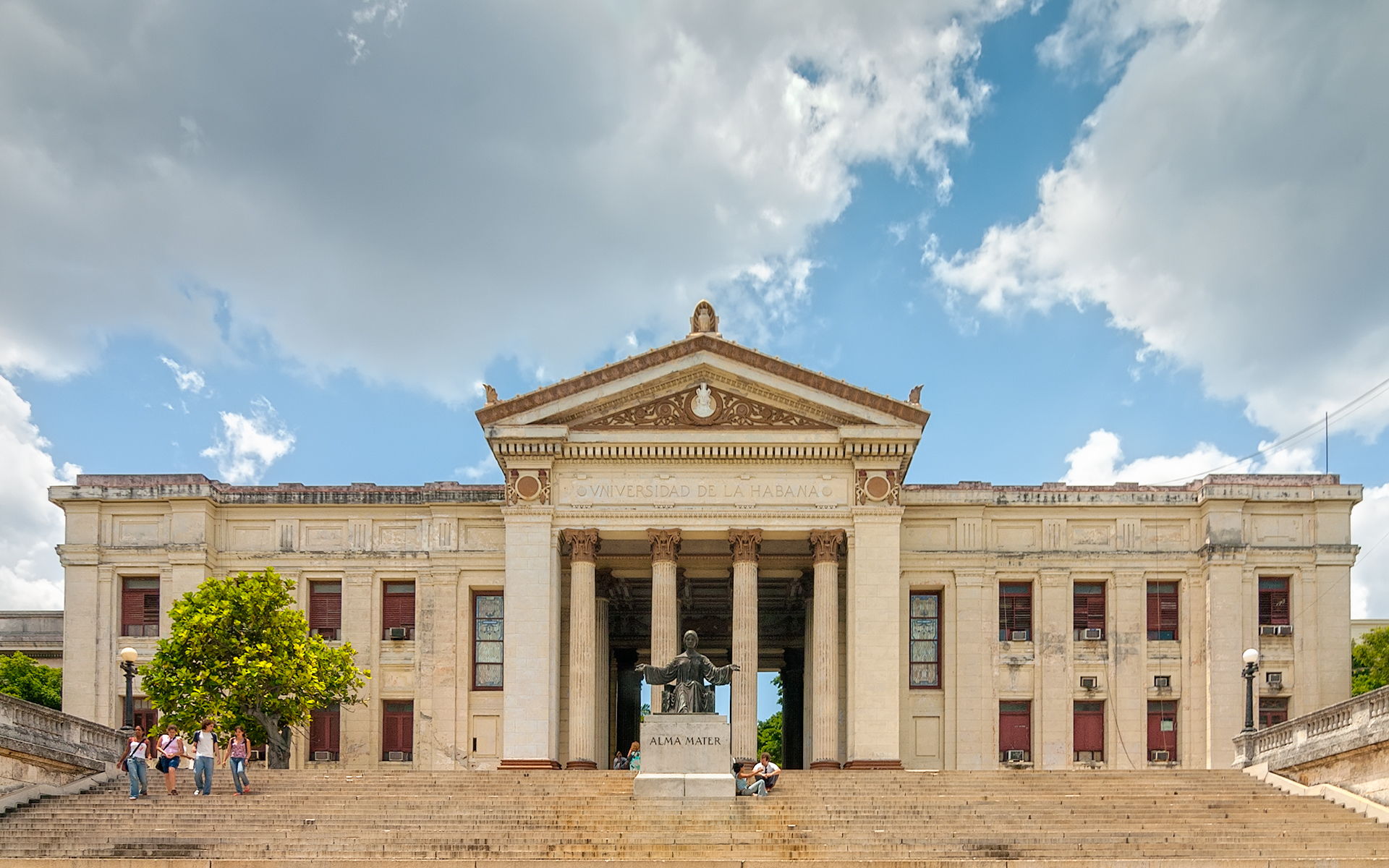
- Type: Public
- Established: 5 January 1728; 298 years ago
- Rector: Miriam Nicado García, Ph.D
- Faculty: over 300
- Students: 24,247
- Location: Havana, Cuba
- Website: www.uh.cu

The University of Havana (UH; Spanish: Universidad de La Habana) is a public university located in the Vedado district of Havana, the capital of Cuba. Founded on 5 January 1728, the university is the oldest in Cuba, and one of the first to be founded in the Americas. Originally a religious institution, today the university has 15 faculties (colleges) at its Havana campus and distance learning centers throughout Cuba.

== History ==
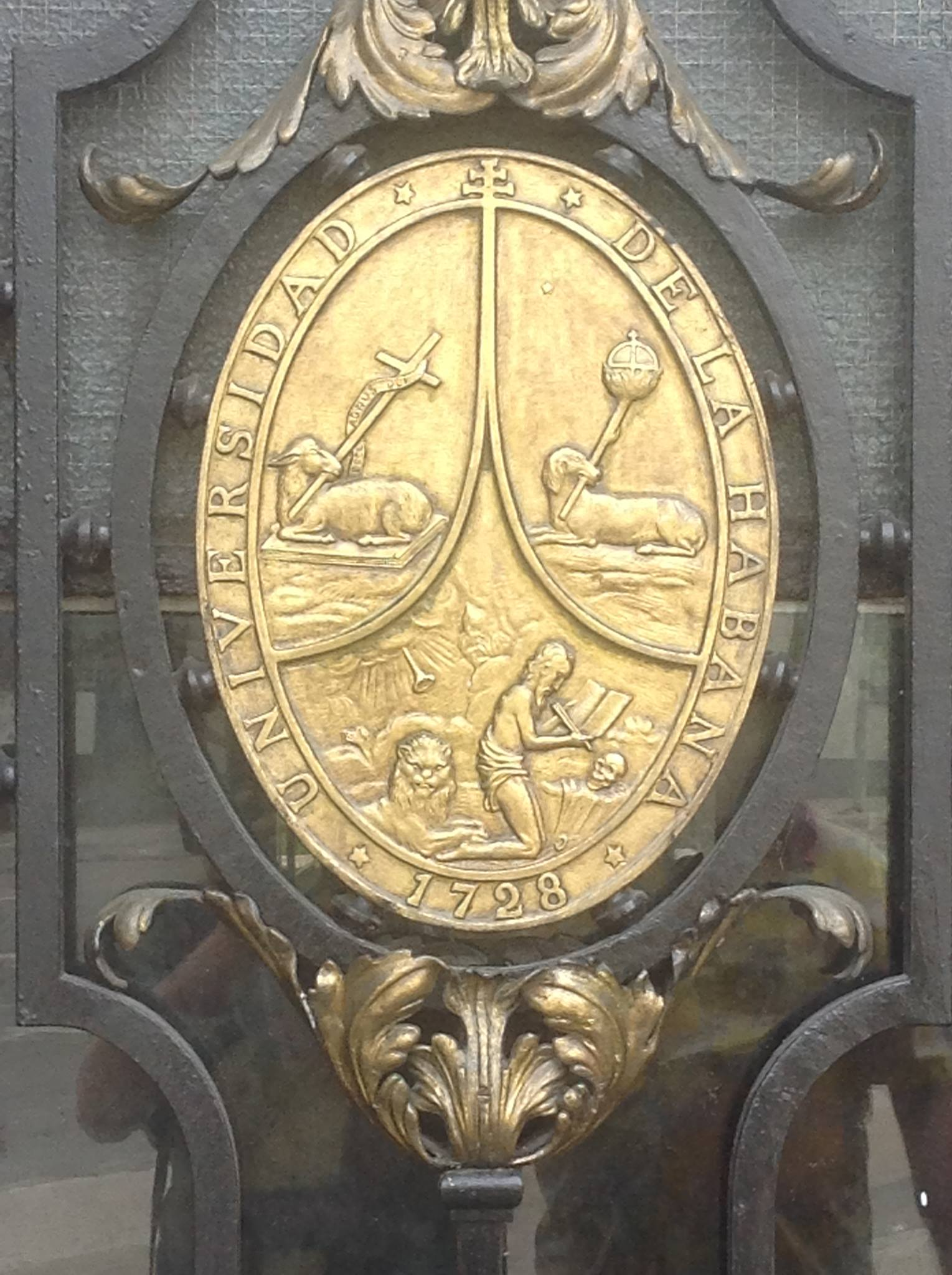
Seal of the University of Havana

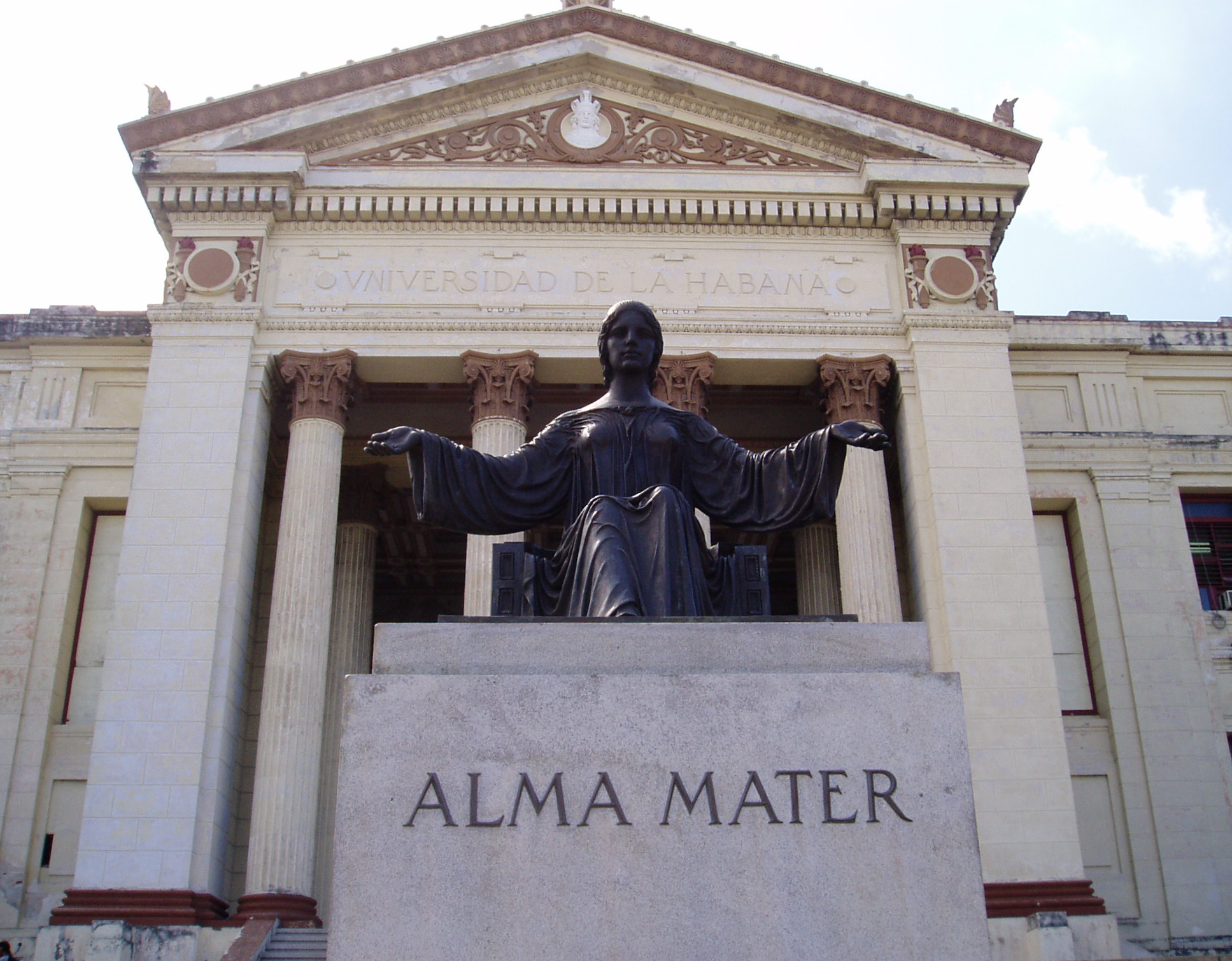
Statue of Alma Mater on the main steps of the university.

Founded in 1728 by Dominican friars belonging to the Order of Preachers (la Orden de Predicadores) as Real y Pontificia Universidad de San Gerónimo de la Habana (Royal and Pontifical University of Saint Jerome of Havana) with six original faculties: Art and Philosophy, Theology, Canons, Law, and Medicine.

In 1842, the university changed its status to become a secular, royal and literary institution. Its name became Real y Literaria Universidad de La Habana (Royal and Literary University of Havana) and later, when Cuba was a free republic, the name was changed to Universidad Nacional (National University).

The university had first been established in San Juan de Letrán (located in Villa de San Cristóbal in Old Havana) before it was transferred on 1 May 1902, to a hill in the Vedado area of Havana. The interiors of the building were decorated by Armando Menocal y Menocal. The seven frescos represent Medicine, Science, Art, Thought, Liberal Arts, Literature, and Law. At the main university entrance (shown above) there is a bronze statue of Alma Mater (meaning the "Nourishing mother" in Latin) that was created in 1919 by artist Mario Korbel, who based his design off of Alma Mater, the Daniel Chester French statue at Columbia University in New York City. The model for the statue's face was 16-year-old Feliciana "Chana" Villalón, the daughter of José Ramón Villalón y Sánchez, a professor of analytical mathematics at the university. Chana later married Juan Manuel Menocal (a distant relative of Armando Menocal), who went on to become the Dean of the Business School. Juan Manuel Menocal was a professor at the law school when Fidel Castro was a student there in the 1940s. Maria Rosa Menocal, former Director of the Whitney Humanities Center at Yale, was the granddaughter of Chana and Juan Manuel Menocal. (See Alma Mater Witness of Time by Eduardo Heras León).

The main library "Rubén Martínez Villena" was established later in 1936.

After the government was taken over by Fulgencio Batista in 1952, the university became a center of anti-government protests. Batista closed the university in 1956. From 1 January 1959, the date on which Fidel Castro seized power in Cuba, until 1 January 1962, the university went through a period of reformation to eliminate "anti-revolutionary ideas".

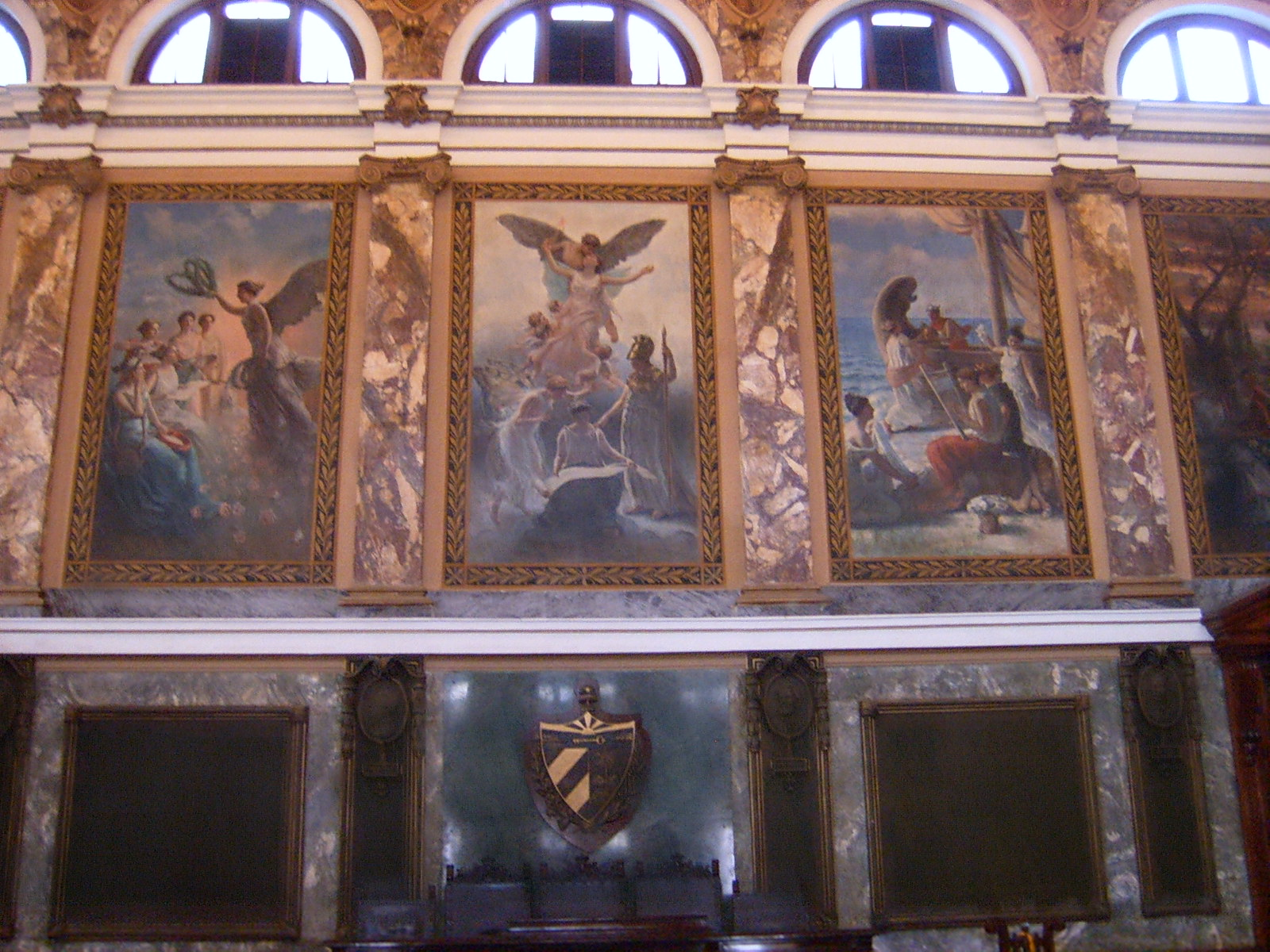
Aula Magna (Great Hall)

In 2002, Rutgers University–Camden and the University of Havana signed a memorandum of understanding (MOU) to formalize research and exchange opportunities for students and faculty.

The MOU was re-signed in October 2016 with the addition of encompassing all of Rutgers, The State University of New Jersey.

Throughout its history, the university has received multiple awards for its research work. In February 2022, thanks to its contributions in the fight against COVID-19, the institute received the Science and Innovation award from the Union of Latin American Universities, during the celebration of the International Congress on Higher Education.

== Organization ==
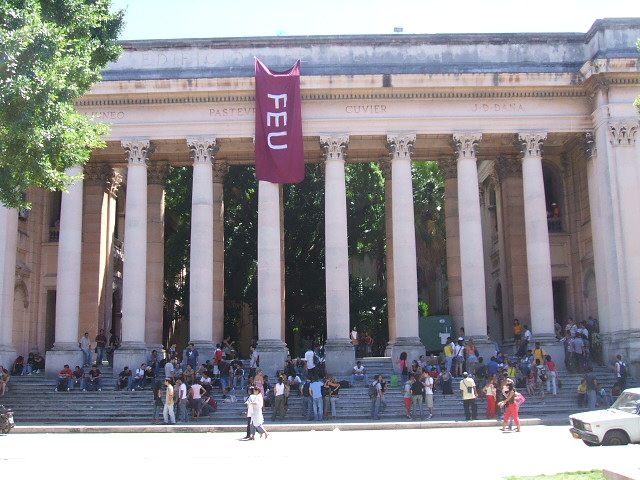
Faculty of Math and Computer Science

The University of Havana is made up of 16 faculties (Spanish: facultades) and 14 research centers in a variety of fields, including economics, sciences, social science, and humanities. In total, up to 25 specialties are taught at the university. Now, it has about 60,000 degree students in regular classes.

There are 16 faculties into which the university is divided:

- Natural Sciences
  - Faculty of Biology
  - Faculty of Pharmacy and Foods
  - Faculty of Physics
  - Faculty of Geography
  - Faculty of Mathematics and Computer Science
  - Faculty of Psychology
  - Faculty of Chemistry
- Social Sciences and Humanities
  - Faculty of Arts and Letters
  - Faculty of Communication
  - Faculty of Law
  - Faculty of Philosophy, History, and Sociology
  - Faculty of Foreign Languages
- Economic Sciences
  - Faculty of Accounting and Finance
  - Faculty of Economics
  - Faculty of Tourism
- Distance Education

== Student organizations ==
Before the Cuban Revolution of 1959, students joined different organizations, aligning themselves directly or indirectly with some political party. The strongest of all these organizations was the FEU (Federación Estudiantil Universitaria or University Students Federation) created by Julio Antonio Mella, a co-founder of the Cuban Communist Party in the 1920s. The European revolutionary tradition of college-based political activism that was practised in Cuba and in many other Latin American countries and the alleged corruption of Cuban political parties at the time turned the FEU, a stronghold of communist ideology, into the most influential of Cuban political organizations before 1959. It was a major participant in the overthrowing of the Cuban President Gerardo Machado. The FEU initiated the national general strike of 1933, resulting in the imprisonment of many of its members. Founder Julio Antonio Mella, himself had been killed at the hands of two assassins sent by Machado while exiled in Mexico in 1929.

After the coup d'état by Fulgencio Batista in 1952, when free and democratic elections were suspended, the violent clashes between university students and Cuban police reached their extremes. Students known to be members of the FEU were violently tortured and killed in the streets of Havana, and the organization reacted with an irregular war in the city, aiming mainly to assassinate police officers of high rank, like the chief of the police in Havana, Blanco Rico, who was killed by 4 FEU members. After the assault on the Moncada barracks by Fidel Castro, an attorney who graduated from Havana University School of Law, and who had contacts in the FEU, the FEU became an ally of Castro's new 26th of July Movement, though there were discrepancies between the leaders in the form that the forthcoming revolution should be carried out. While Fidel Castro was hiding in the Sierra Maestra mountains, the FEU, led by Jose Antonio Echeverria, attempted to kill Fulgencio Batista in an armed assault at the Cuban Presidential Palace on 13 March 1957. Batista managed to escape, and many student assailants died in the action, as did Echeverria himself. During the months that followed, the police executed many of the students that led the failed coup. President Batista ordered the university to be closed, and it remained so until Batista fled the country and Fidel Castro entered Havana in January 1959.

The Castro administration re-opened the university in 1959.

== Notable alumni and faculty ==
=== Alumni ===
- Carlos Alfonzo (1950–1991), Cuban American artist
- Ángel Arango (1926–2013), science fiction writer
- Olinta Ariosa Morales (1921–1999), librarian
- Manuel Barcia (born 1972), historian and university leader based in the UK
- Mariano Brull (1891–1956), poet
- Ana Cairo Ballester (1949–2019), longtime history professor at the university
- Fidel Castro (1926–2016), Cuban leader
- Ana Colomar O'Brien (born 1938), American diplomat
- Osvaldo Dorticós Torrado (1919–1983), politician
- Danny Faure (born 1962), Seychelles politician
- Nicolás Guillén (1902–1989), poet
- José Lezama Lima (1910–1976), writer
- Dulce María Loynaz (1902–1997), poet
- Juan Marinello (1898–1977), writer
- David Masnata y de Quesada (1926-88), writer and lawyer
- Nancy Morejón (born 1944), poet
- Jose Antonio Ortega Bonet (1929–2009), Goya founder
- Antonio Quintana Simonetti (1919–1993), architect
- Blanche Zacharie de Baralt (1865/1866–1950), writer
- Husni Abdel Wahed, Palestinian journalist and diplomat (born 1960)

=== Faculty ===
- Mary Stanley Low (1912–2007), British-Cuban political activist, Trotskyist, surrealist poet and artist and teacher
- Malcolm B. Willis (1935–2011), English geneticist

== See also ==
- Eberto Escobedo Lazo
- Education in Cuba
- List of universities in Cuba
- List of colonial universities in Latin America
