= Emelina Peyrellade Zaldívar =

Cuban translator

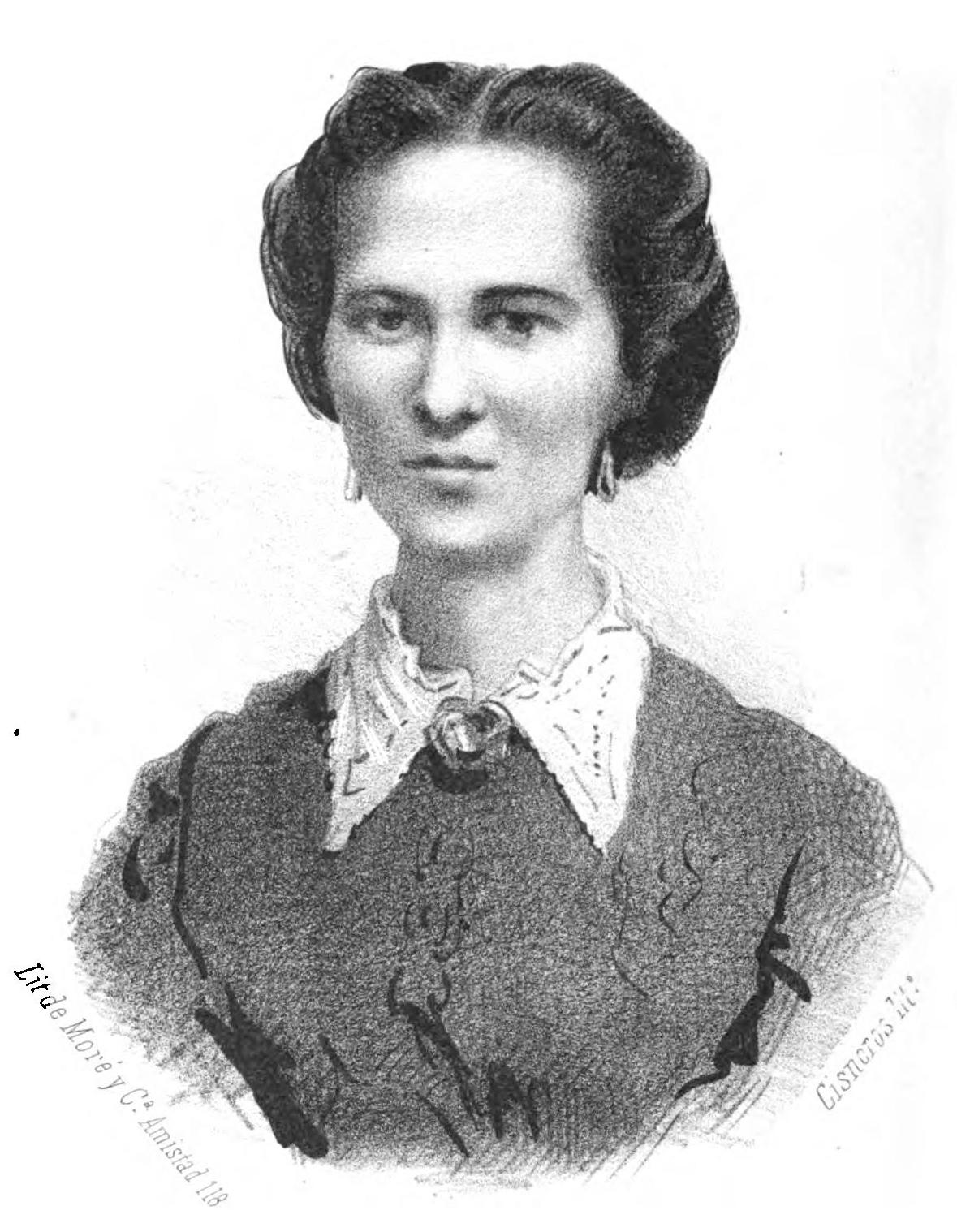
Emelina Peyrellade in “Poetic-photographic album of Cuban women writers”, by Domitila García de Coronado. Military Printing House of Viuda e Hs. de Soler, 1868.

Emelina Peyrellade Zaldívar or Emelina Peyrellade (Camagüey, 1842–1877) was a Cuban writer and translator.

== Biography ==
She was born in Camagüey in 1842. She was the daughter of the French publicist Emilio Peyrellade. According to Domitila García de Coronado, she received a good education with an important artistic and literary background. From her youth, she devoted herself to the culture of writing and became associated with the literary milieu and Cuban writers of Camagüey, specialising in translating from Italian and French into Spanish. Her translations have appeared in various publications such as El Fanal, El Oriente and El Popular. Of particular note is William Tell, which appeared in El Fanal on 26 February 1861.
