= Digna Collazo =

Cuban activist and midwife

- Born: Cuba
- Died: Cuba
- Occupations: Midwife; Essayist; Editor; Translator
- Known for: Feminist activism
- Political party: Feminist Party; National Suffragist Party

María Digna Collazo y del Castillo was a Cuban midwife, essayist, editor, suffragist, and feminist activist. She was one of the architects of Cuba's women's suffrage campaign of the 1910s, along with Amalia Mallén and Aída Peláez de Villa Urrutia. To this end, she participated in the foundation of the first organizations that sought to allow women to vote in her country, such as the Cuban Suffragists (1912) and the National Suffragist Party (1913) – of which she was vice president. Furthermore, together with Carmen Velacoracho de Lara, she founded the Feminist Party in 1918.

Digna Collazo was also the first president of the nascent Midwives' Association of Cuba in 1889, an entity which enabled the compulsory licensing of this type of professional.

She was also editor-in-chief of the magazine El Amigo (1900) and director of the periodical El Sufragista (1913).
