= Brígida Agüero =

Cuban poet (1837–1866)

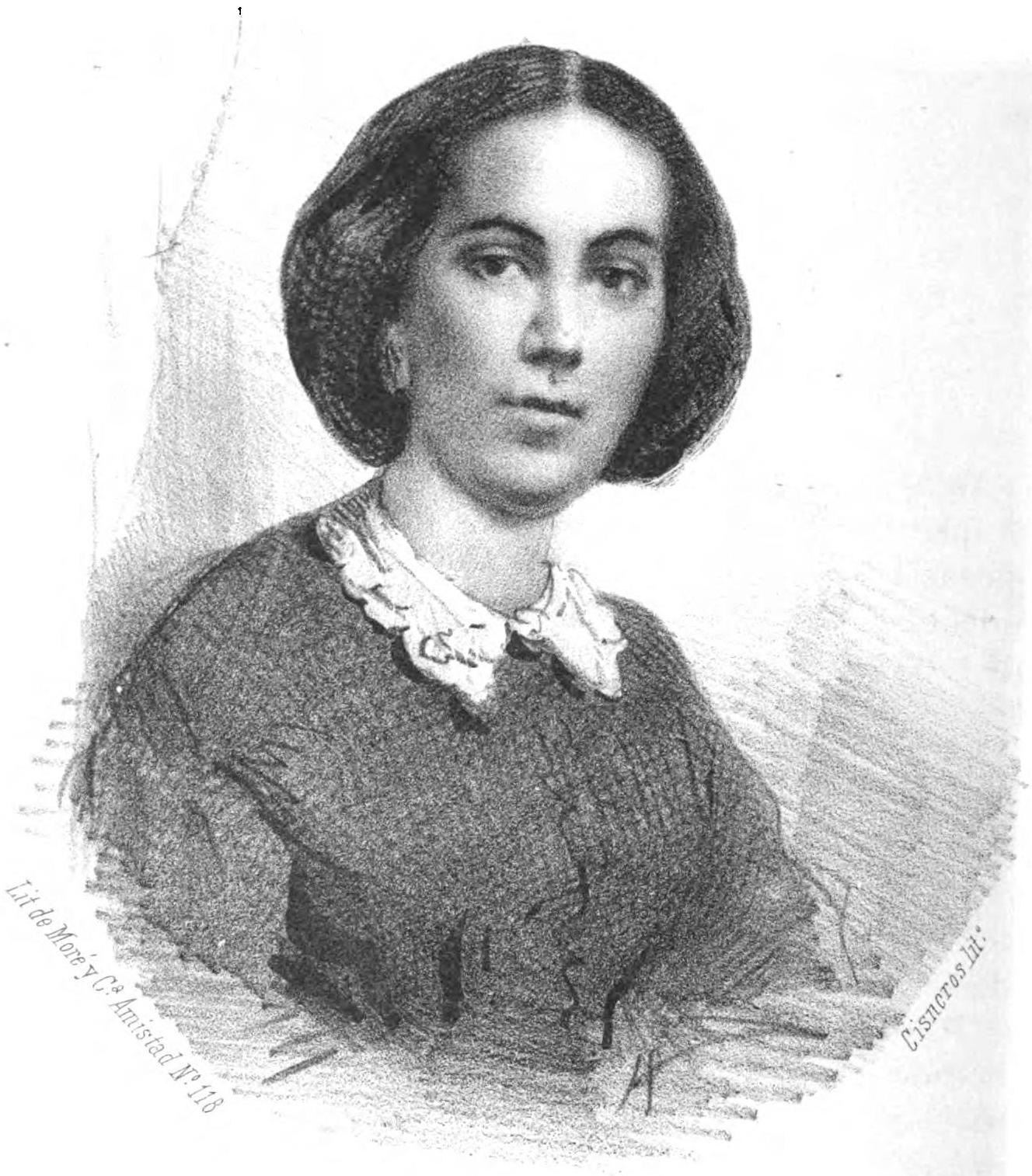
- Born: May 12, 1837; Camagüey, Cuba
- Died: February 26, 1866 (aged 28); Camagüey, Cuba
- Parents: Francisco de Agüero y Estrada (father); Ana Maria Agüero y Varona (mother)

Brígida Agüero y Agüero (1837–1866) was a 19th-century poet from Camagüey, Cuba.

== Bibliography ==
Brígida was born to the poet Francisco Agüero y Estrada and Ana Maria Agüero y Varona, very respectable and distinguished people of society. Her father was generally appreciated for his literary talent, and for being one of the first poets of Puerto-Principe, the town that's known today as Camagüey.

Agüero's early studies were limited to the teaching she received from her parents as she grew up on the family farm near Camagüey. Over the years she moved to the city where she released her poems.

In 1861, she expanded her education at the academy run by the Camagüey Philharmonic Society. The Society had established some literature classes and Agüero was able to attend them as a student. According to Domitila García de Coronado, "with her assiduous perseverance and application, she made very rapid progress in good time and the Institute, for rewarding her talents, appointed her as a faculty member of said Section."

Agüero presented her work to the Society, reading it herself. According to Coronado, "Several times her voice resounded in that beautiful room, and whenever she presented herself to read the productions of her fertile genius, she was welcomed with marked signs of acceptance and sympathy, to the point of raising it to a distinguished degree... [and] drew much applause."

== Death ==
Agüero suffered a slow decline in her health and died of consumption February 26, 1866, at 29 years of age. Her final poem, a sonnet titled Resignation, is one she wrote on her deathbed.

According to Coronado, after her death, Agüero's "memory was honored with many respectful tributes. Cuban poets made a poetic funeral wreath regretting such a sad event."

In 1955, Camagüey city officials considered naming one of its streets in the poet's honor citing her work, "as an outstanding student of the classes of literature of the Philharmonic Society of Puerto-Principe, having reaped great successes in 1861." After deliberation and, "using democracy, the president put the matter to a nominal vote and the name change was approved by a majority."

== Selected poems ==
- Portrait of a young lady (1858)
- Echoes of the soul (1858)
- Inspiration (1858)
- The Christian faith (1858)
- Flowers of the soul (1859)
- Lo Bello (1859)
- To Mrs. Gertrudis Gómez de Avellaneda (1859)
- To the Virgin (1859)
- The Encounter (1859)
- The Arts and Glory (1860)
- Resignation (a sonnet written on her deathbed)

In 1928, Agüero's poems were included in the third volume of José Manuel Carbonell's Evolution of Cuban Culture. 1608-1927. (Lyric poetry in Cuba, Havana, Imp. El Siglo XX, 1928, p. 365-367.)
