= Aída Peláez de Villa Urrutia =

Cuban writer, journalist, suffragist and feminist activist

- Born: 5 February 1895; Havana, Cuba
- Died: 1923 (aged 27–28)
- Occupations: Writer; Journalist
- Spouses: Teodoro J. Creus Esther (divorced); Wenceslao de Villa Urrutia
- Writing career
- Pen name: Eugenio
- Language: Spanish

Aída Peláez Martínez (fl. 5 February 1895 – 1923), also known by her pseudonym Eugenio, was a Cuban writer, journalist, suffragist, and feminist activist. She was one of the architects of Cuba's women's suffrage campaign of the 1910s, along with Digna Collazo and Amalia Mallén. To this end, she participated in various pro-feminist organizations.

== Life and work ==
She was the daughter of Rodolfo Manuel José Jesús Peláez y Hernández and Adela María Aída de la Caridad Martínez y Díaz Morales, and began to write at an early age. After her father forbade her to continue such work, she used the pseudonym Eugenio at the request of her mother.

Aída was one of the pioneers of the feminist movement in Cuba. She participated in the Continental Women's Union, an organization which took a leading role, and served in the National Suffragist Party as its vice president and representative in the First Women's Congress (1923). She also founded the Panamerican Round Table and Women's House of America. She was the "first woman to be counted as a member of the Governing Board of the Athenaeum of Havana, having been re-elected to it three times."

In 1923, she published "Necesidad del voto para la mujer" (Necessity of the vote for women) in the magazines El Sufragista and El sufragio femenino. Furthermore, she was editor of the periodicals La discusión, La Mujer (together with Domitila García de Coronado and Isabel Margarita Ordetx), de Atlántida (together with Clara Moreda), and the literary-cultural magazine Ideal which she founded in 1919.
