= Isabel Margarita Ordetx =

Cuban writer, poet, and feminist activist

- Born: Isabel Margarita Ordetx y Cruz Prieto; 1897 Havana, Captaincy General of Cuba, Spanish Empire
- Died: Cuba
- Occupation: Writer; Poet; Feminist activist
- Language: Spanish
- Genre: Essay
- Literary movement: Feminism

Isabel Margarita Ordetx y Cruz Prieto (1897 – ) was a Cuban writer, poet, and feminist activist. She contributed to various publications of her country as a chronicler, including Heraldo de Cuba, La Discusión, El Fígaro, la Bohemia, América, Las Antillas, and Arte. Revista Universal.

She was also editor of La Mujer, together with Aída Peláez de Villa Urrutia and Domitila García de Coronado. She launched the women's magazine Vanidades with Josefina Mosquera in 1937, and was its editor-in-chief from 1937 to 1952.
