= Camagüey =

- City
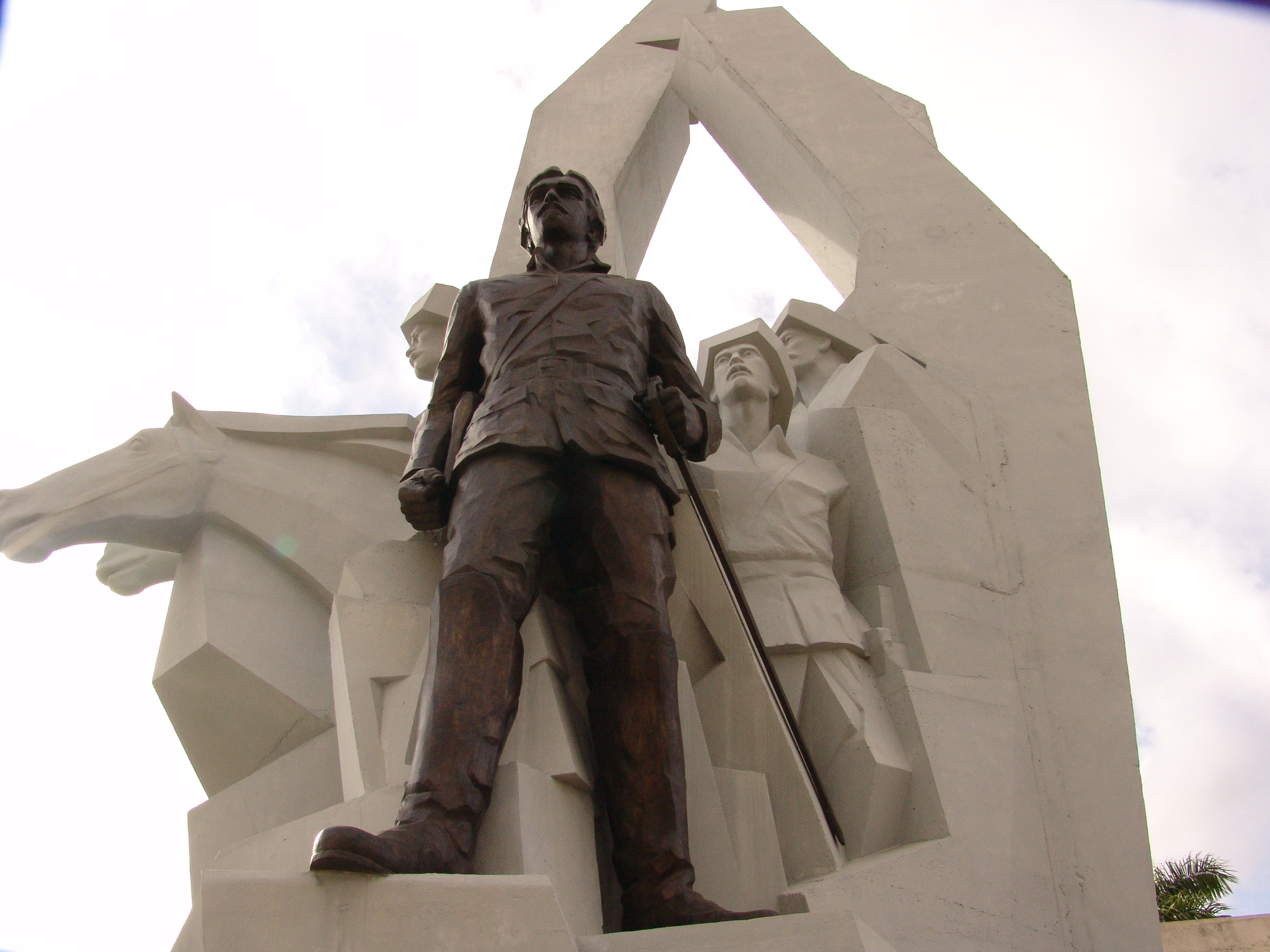
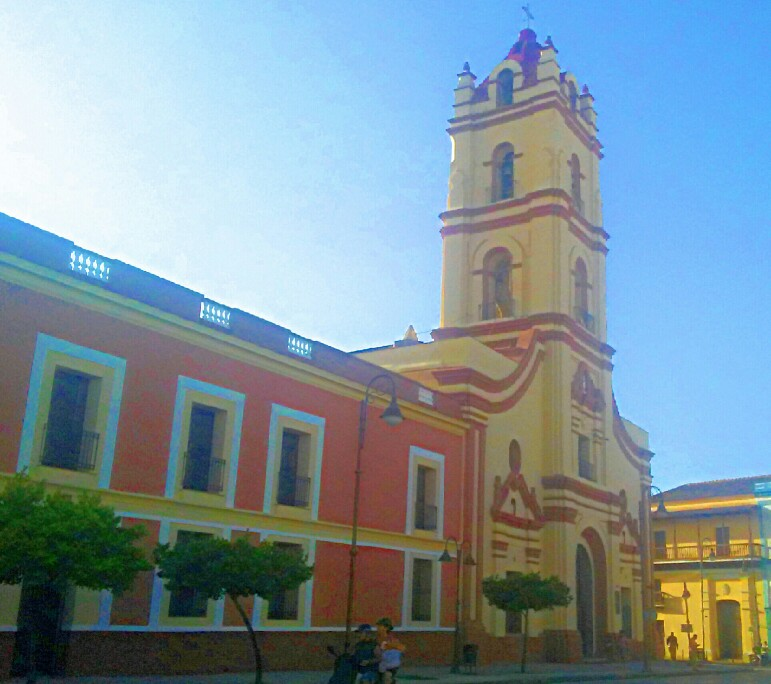
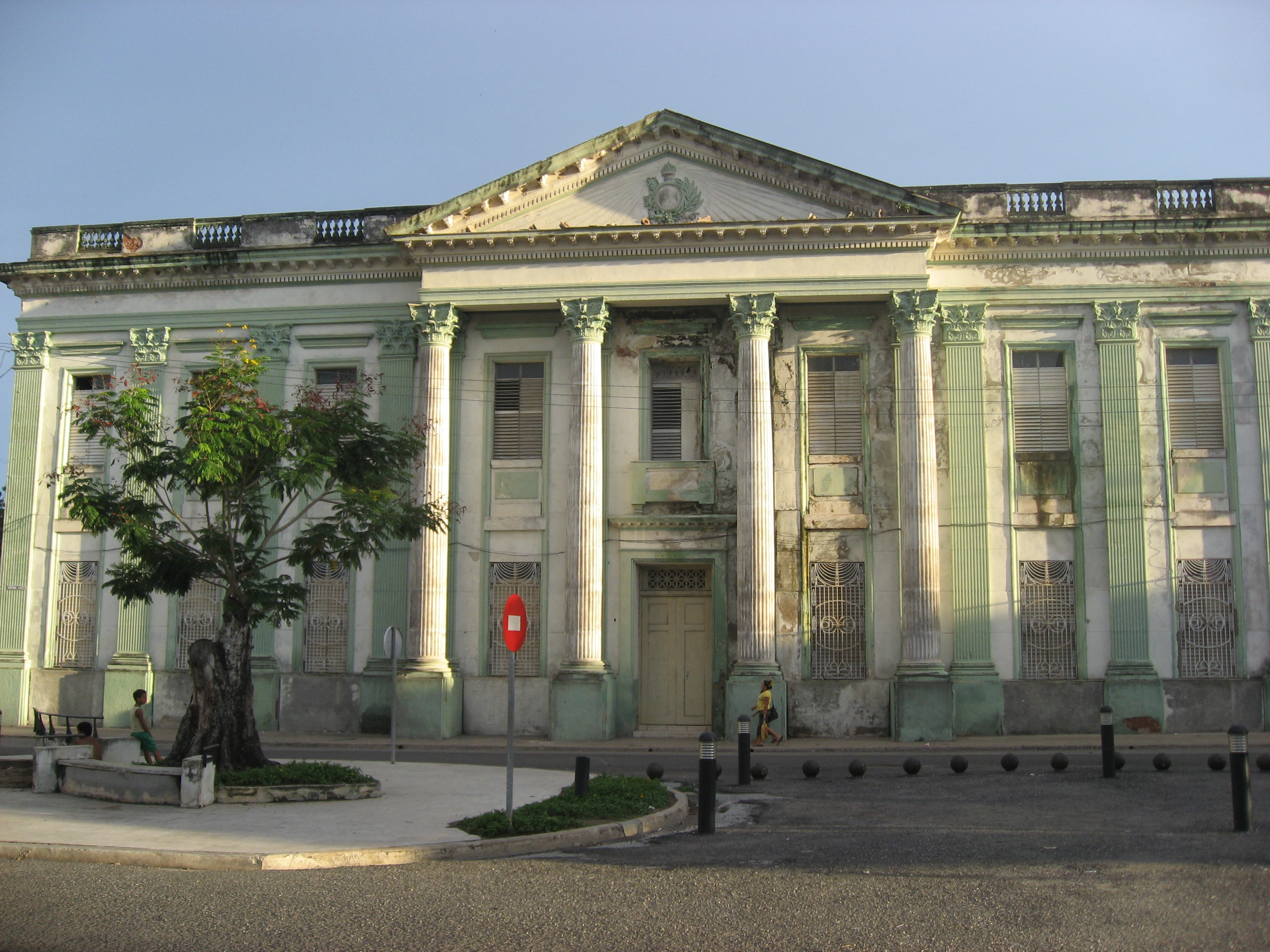
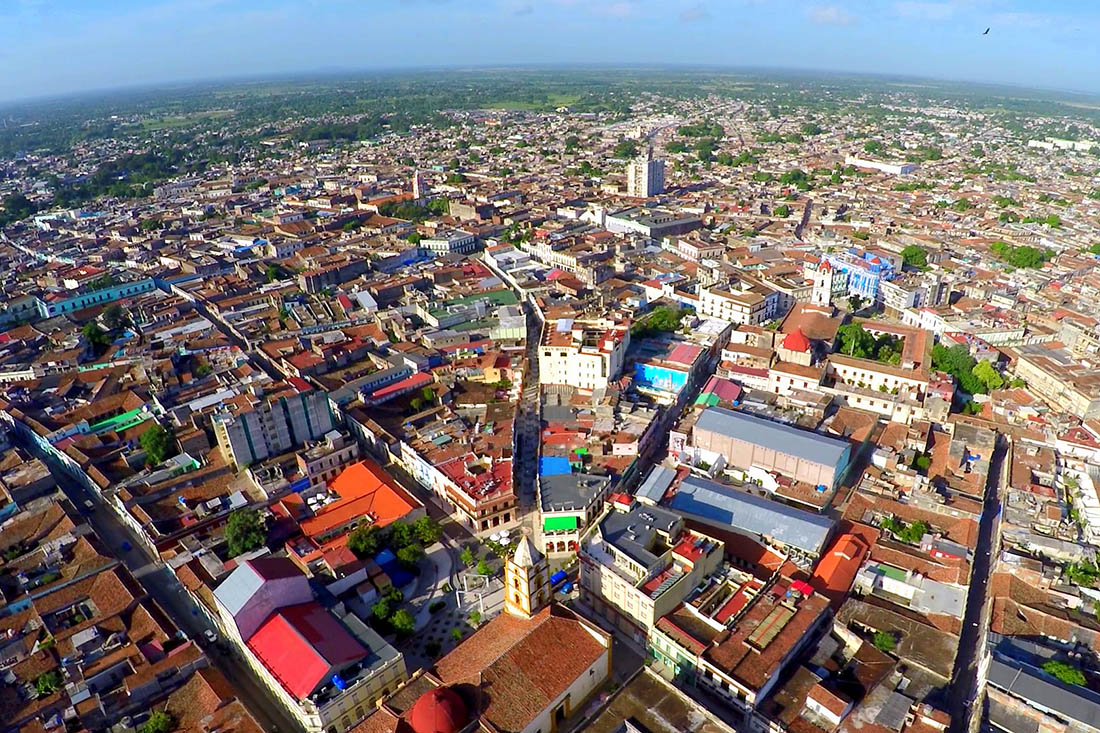
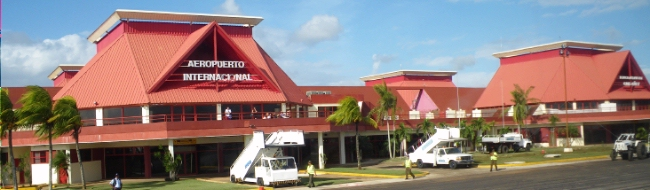
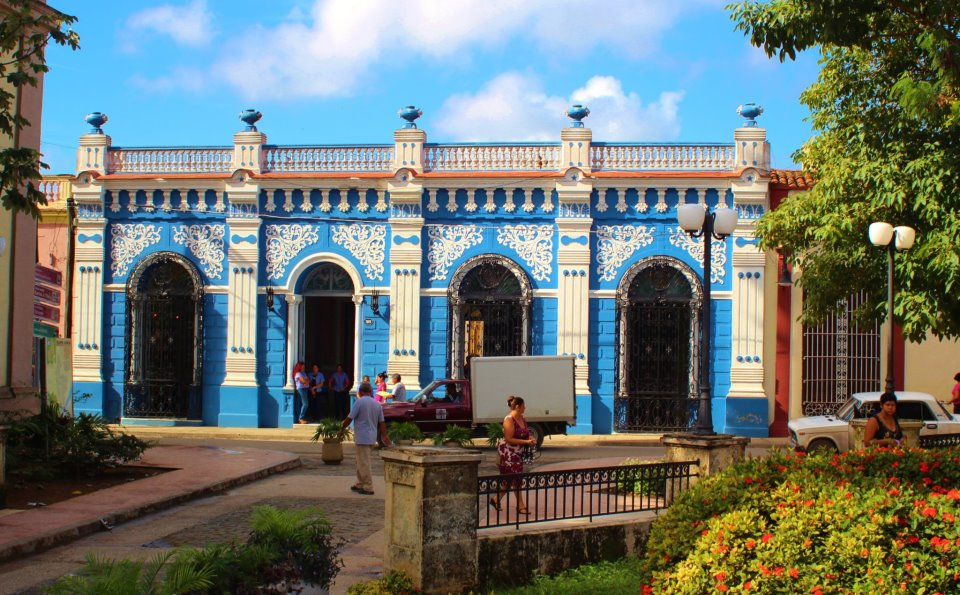
- Ignacio Agramonte sculpture Church of Nuestra Señora de la Merced Cerro Pelado Stomatological Clinic Aerial photography of Camagüey Ignacio Agramonte International Airport Rovirosa Family House

- Coat of arms
- Nickname: City of the Big Jars (Ciudad de los Tinajones)
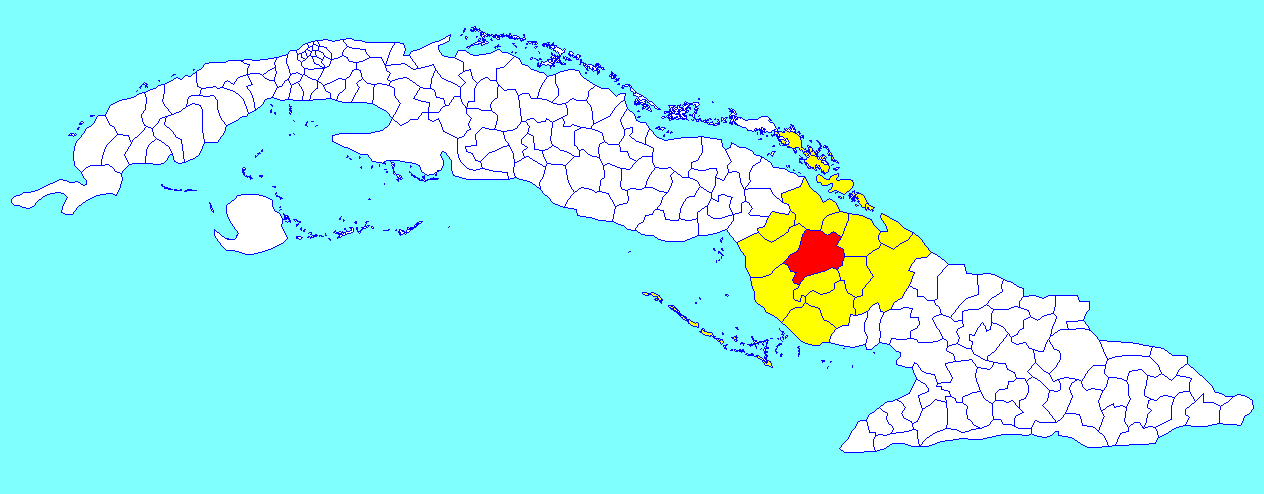
- Camagüey municipality (red) within Camagüey Province (yellow) and Cuba
- Coordinates: 21°23′2″N 77°54′27″W
- Country: Cuba
- Province: Camagüey
- Founded: 1528

Government
  - President: Dixamy Rodríguez Gómez

Area
  - City: 1,106 km^{2} (427 sq mi)
- Elevation: 95 m (312 ft)

Population (2022)
  - City: 333,251
  - Density: 301.3/km^{2} (780.4/sq mi)
  - Urban: 313,216
- Demonym: Camagüeyano

GDP (PPP, constant 2015 values)
  - Year: 2023
  - Total: $4.0 billion
  - Per capita: $12,900
- Time zone: UTC-5 (EST)
- Postal code: 70100
- Area code: +53 322
- Climate: Aw
- Website: http://www.camaguey.gob.cu/es/

UNESCO World Heritage Site
- Official name: Historic Centre of Camagüey
- Criteria: Cultural: iv, v
- Reference: 1270
- Inscription: 2008 (32nd Session)
- Area: 54 ha (0.21 sq mi)
- Buffer zone: 276 ha (1.07 sq mi)

Camagüey (Spanish pronunciation: [kamaˈ(ɣ)wej]) is a city and municipality in central Cuba and is the nation's third-largest city with more than 333,000 inhabitants. It is the capital of the Camagüey Province.

It was founded as Santa María del Puerto del Príncipe in 1514, by Spanish colonists on the northern coast and moved inland in 1528, to the site of a Taino village named Camagüey. It was one of the seven original settlements (villas) founded in Cuba by the Spanish. After Henry Morgan burned the city in the 17th century, it was redesigned like a maze so attackers would find it hard to move around inside the city.

The symbol of the city of Camagüey is the clay pot or tinajón, used to capture rain water and keep it fresh. Camagüey is also the birthplace of Ignacio Agramonte (1841), an important figure of the Ten Years' War against Spain. A monument by Italian sculptor Salvatore Buemi, erected in the center of the area to Ignacio Agramonte, was unveiled by his wife in 1912. It is composed of an equestrian statue, reliefs in bronze that reveal fragments of the life of Agramonte, and a sculpture of a woman that symbolizes the motherland.

In July 2008, the old town was designated a UNESCO World Heritage Site, because of its irregular, maze-like city planning, its prominent role in early Spanish colonization and agriculture, and its rich architecture showing a variety of influences.

== History ==
Camagüey was founded as Santa María del Puerto del Príncipe on 2 February 1514, by Spanish colonists led by Diego Velázquez de Cuéllar at a location now known as Nuevitas on the northern coast. It was one of the seven original settlements (villas) founded in Cuba by the Spanish. The settlement was moved inland in 1528 to the site of a Taíno village named Camagüey.

The new city was built with a confusing lay-out of winding alleys. There are many blind alleys and forked streets that lead to squares of different sizes. One explanation is that this was done by design, to make the city easier to defend from any raiders; by the same version, the reason that there is only one exit from the city was that should pirates ever return and succeed in entering the city, it would be possible for local inhabitants to entrap and kill them. However, locals dispute this reasoning as a myth, asserting that in truth the city developed without planning at all, and that winding streets developed out of everybody wanting to stay close to their local church (the city has 15 of them).

During the eighteenth century the city was called Santa María del Puerto del Príncipe; between 1747 and 1753 Luis de Unzaga y Amézaga, then captain governor of Puerto del Príncipe, rehabilitated the city, which had been badly damaged during the War of Jenkins' Ear, and Unzaga also rebuilt the Church of La Merced.

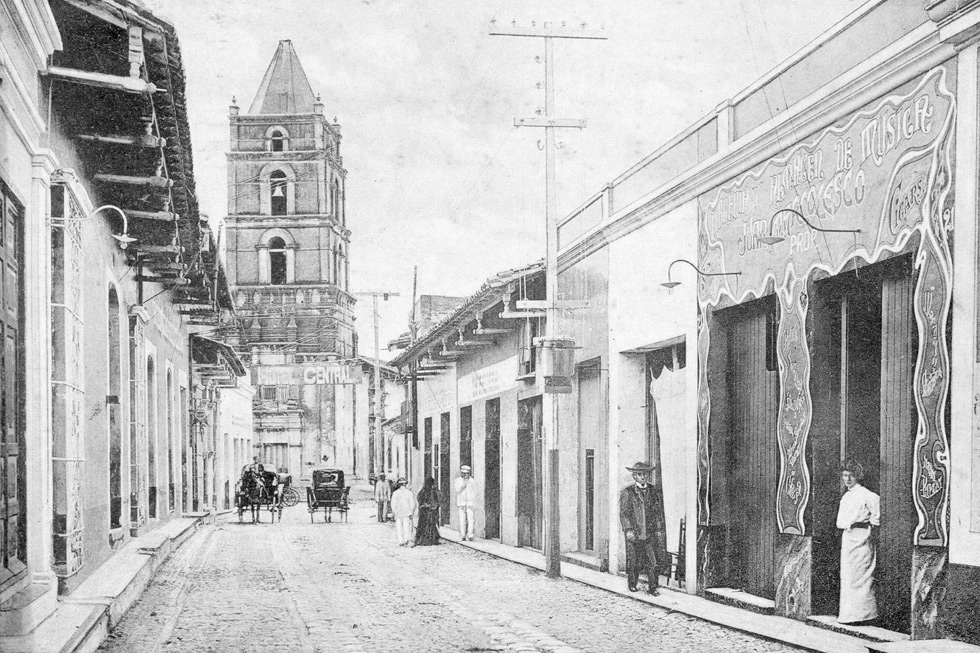
Church of Nuestra Señora de la Soledad, Camagüey, in the late 19th-century.

Upon Cuba's independence from Spain, in 1898, was when the city and its surrounding province received the current name of Camagüey, as a result of the independence from Spain. The indigenous name was already before used to refer to the region "El Camagüey" in reference to the local chief ('cacique') Camagüebax, who ruled between the Tínima and Hatibonico rivers, and was approved on that date for the province that had been created in 1878, the province in this same year was a militar region by the republic in arms.

== Geography ==
Located on a plain in the middle of its province, the municipality borders with Vertientes, Florida, Esmeralda, Sierra de Cubitas, Minas, Sibanicú and Jimaguayú.

== Demographics ==
In 2022, the municipality of Camagüey had a population of 333,251. With a total area of 1,106 km^{2} (427 sq mi), it has a population density of 300/km^{2} (780/sq mi).

== Culture ==
The symbol of the city of Camagüey is the clay pot or tinajón, used to capture rain water to be used later, keeping it fresh. Clay pots are everywhere, some as small as a hand, some large enough for two people to stand up in, either as monuments or for real use. A local legend is that if you drink water from a "tinajón", you will stay in Camagüey ("Quien tome agua del tinajón, en Camagüey se queda"), meaning that if you meet a Camagüeyana girl, you will fall in love with her and never leave. The main secondary education institutions are the University of Camagüey and the Instituto Pedagógico de Camagüey.

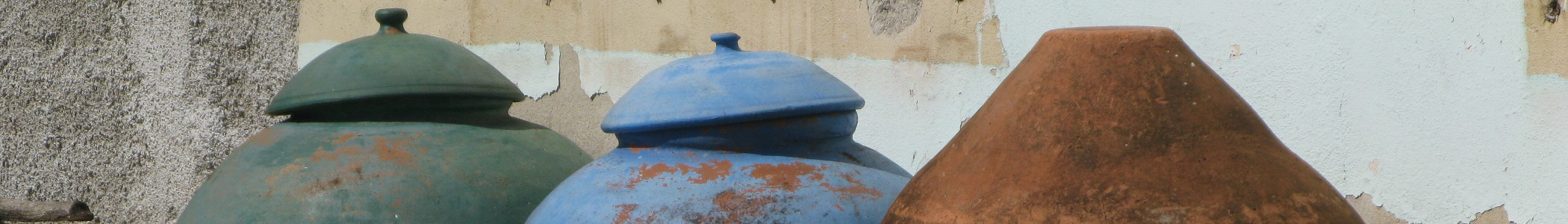
Some Big Jars in Camagüey, the old symbol of the city.

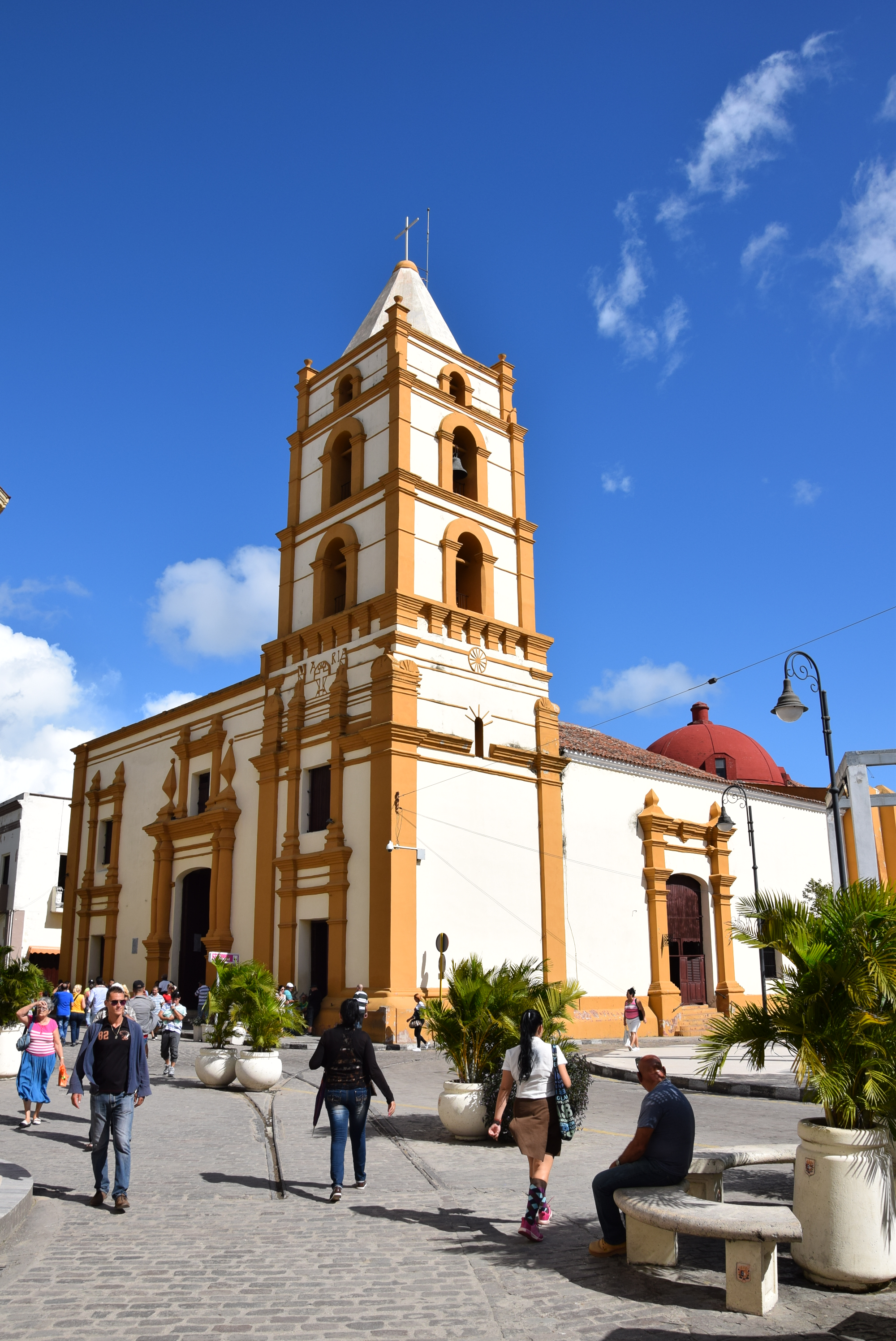
Colonial Church of Nuestra Señora de la Soledad.

The Big Clay Jars or Tinajones were storage jars used to transport wine, oil and grain in the city and introduced by the Spaniards during the early-modern times as the solution to the city's water shortage, placed beneath gutters so that they could fill the water. Slightly tapered at one end, they were half-buried in earth, keeping the water cool and fresh. They soon came to be produced in the town and every house inside and outside, and a family's wealth could be assessed by the style and quantity of their tinajones. This is what historians and archaeologists confirm. At the beginning, in Spain these jars were used to preserve oils, especially olive oil, hence the Spanish brought the model to the early Camagüey, immediately it became in traditional use and a local symbol among the residents of Camagüey adopting creative ways of decorating in those times in the Cuban city.

== Infrastructure ==
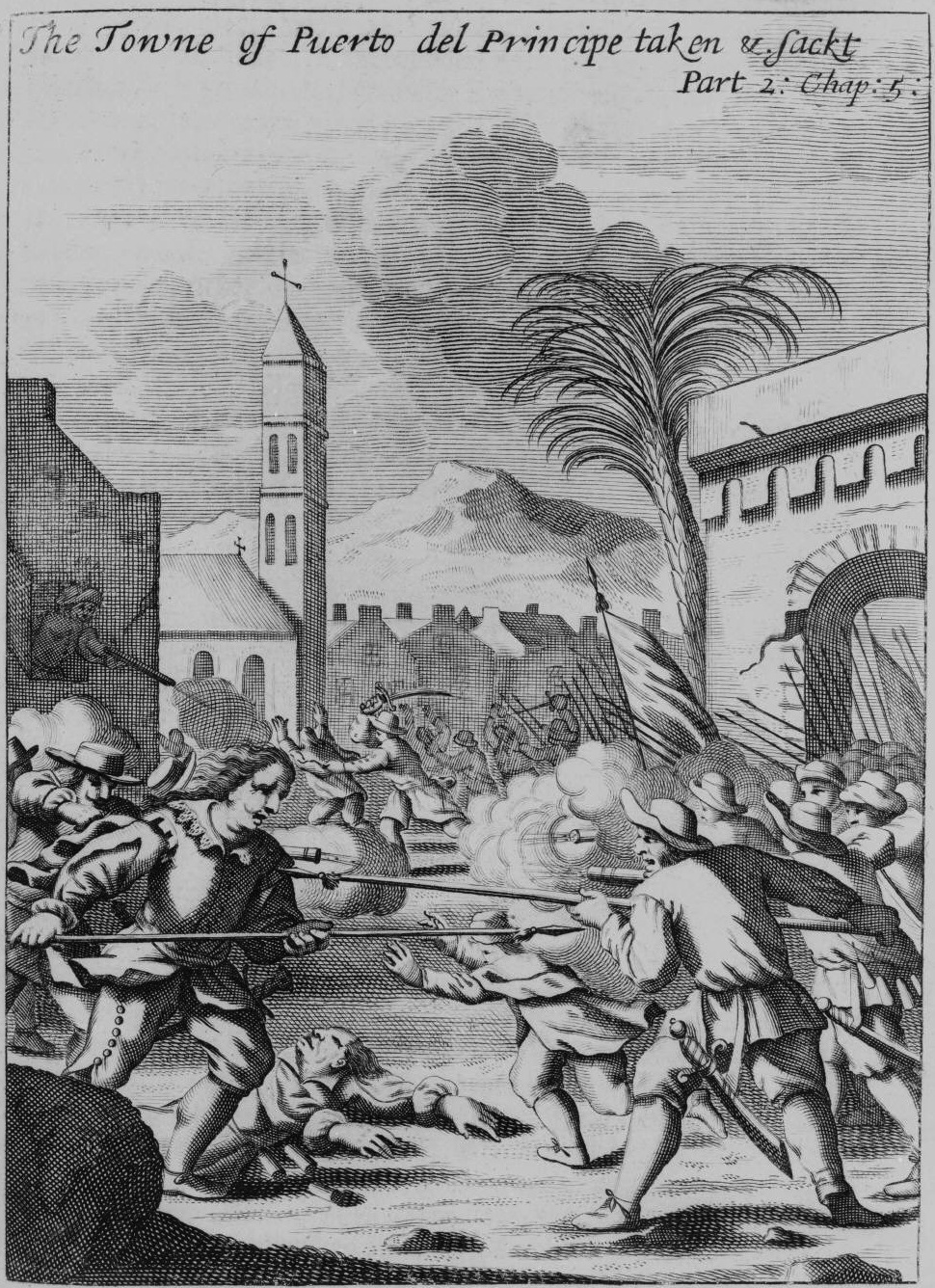
Puerto del Príncipe (current Camagüey) being sacked in 1668 by Henry Morgan, depicted by John Masefield.

=== Street layout ===
The old city layout resembles a real maze, with narrow, short streets always turning in one direction or another. After Henry Morgan burned the city in the 17th century, it was designed like a maze so attackers would find it hard to move around inside the city.

=== Architecture ===
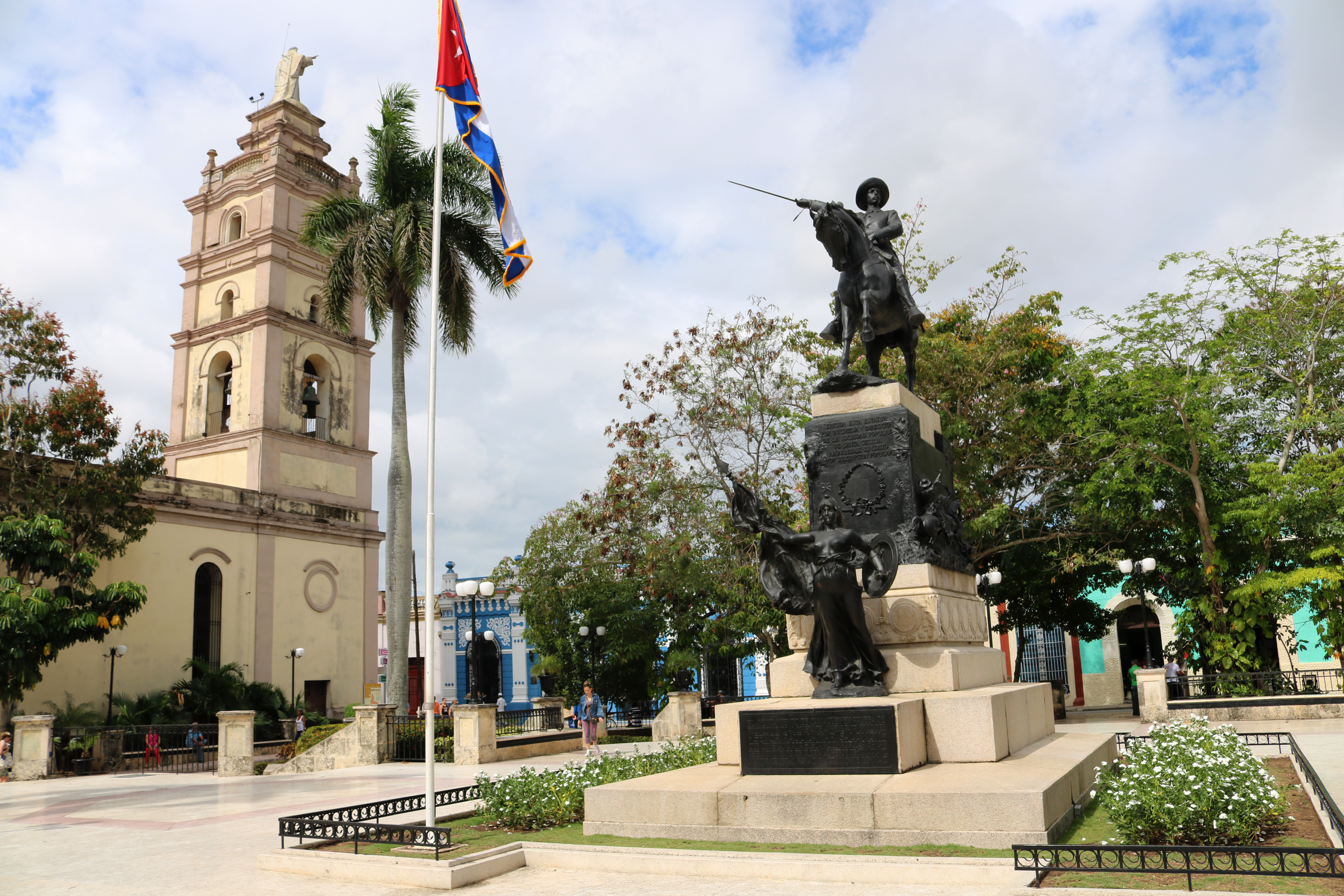
The Cathedral of Camagüey

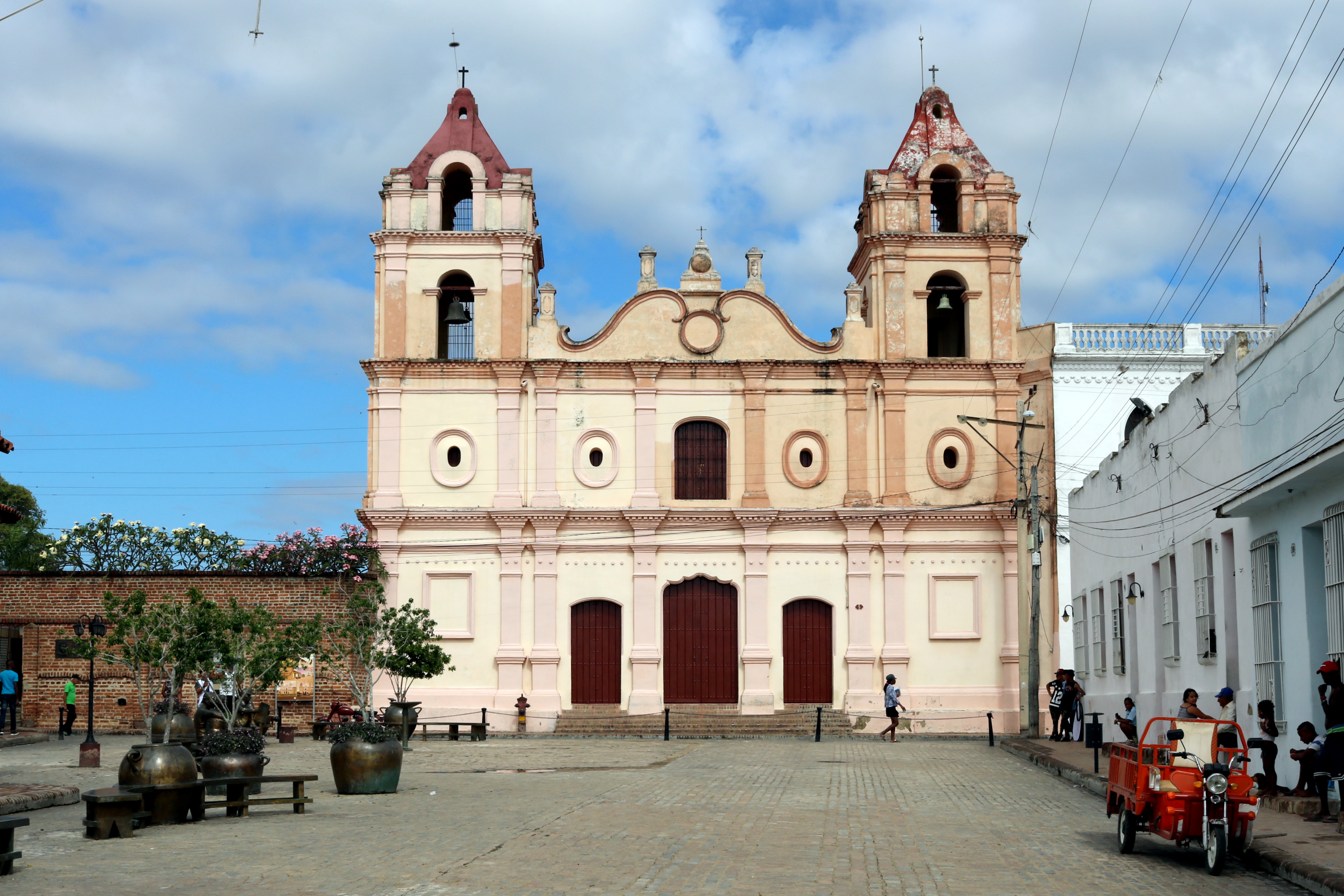
Colonial Church of Nuestra Señora del Carmen

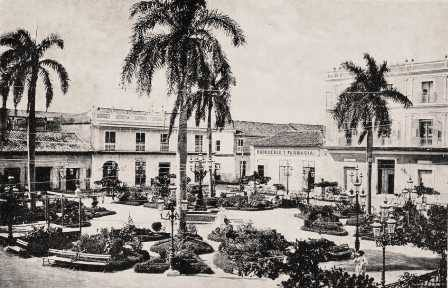
The Colonial Plaza Mayor, today renamed Parque Central Ignacio Agramonte. This is the foundation square, the point where the construction of the city began. Photo in 1889.

Camagüey is a colonial city resembling a real maze streets, it is a UNESCO World Heritage Site.

The city has more than 30 Catholic churches, testimony of its colonial past, of which we can name the following:

- "Church of Nuestra Señora del Carmen", baroque church with two towers, it was completed in 1825.
- The Cathedral of Camagüey, dates back to 1530 when it began as a chapel, completed in 1864.
- The "Church of Nuestra Señora de la Soledad", is the most symbolic church in the city and was built during the 18th century. In its historical photos it does not appear painted, this gave the façade and its tower a very rustic appearance, it is today painted yellow. Inside there are decorated baroque frescoes and the sacred font where the hero Ignacio Agramonte was baptized in 1841.
- "Church and Convent-Hospital San Juan de Dios", the first news of the church and convent of San Juan de Dios date from 1687 and 1692 in documents related to burials that speak of the hermitage of San Juan de Dios or Nuestra Señora de la Asunción respectively. In May 1731, the prior of the Havana hospital of San Juan de Dios, Joseph Díaz Ponte, acknowledged that he was the founder of the convent hospital of Nuestra Señora de la Asunción in the city of Puerto del Príncipe, thus proving the denomination of the church. The construction of the current temple began in 1736 and was completed in 1755. By this date the bishop officially formalized the Brothers Hospitallers of Saint John of God. In its main altar is the Holy Trinity in the form of three human figures, which is the only one in Cuba, a similar image can be found in a colonial church in Lima, Peru.
- "Church of Santa Ana", in a deed of donation made by the Indian Catalina Carmona in 1617, it is stated that there was a hermitage dedicated to Our Lady of Saint Anne, it is one of numerous documents mentioning this church.
- "Church of Nuestra Señora de la Caridad", by the decade of the 1730s, a hermitage with a replica of the Our Lady of Charity del Cobre, which is located in the National Basilica Sanctuary del Cobre, in Santiago de Cuba, emerged there; and which according to some, seems to be the first site erected outside that sanctuary, to venerate the one that is considered "The Patroness of Cuba". The church was first replaced by a chapel and at the same time, by the end of the 18th century and the beginning of the 19th century, the neighborhood of La Caridad was being built. This camino real was characterized by the construction of the first recreational houses of the wealthiest families, built in large grids, different from the oldest and most foundational part of Camagüey. This church was erected as a parish in 1801. In its tower was the public clock from 1822 to 1825, when it was moved to the Church of Las Mercedes because it was more central and the tower was higher.
- "Church del Sagrado Corazón de Jesús", a church of neogothic architecture, was built between 1912 and 1919, and it was built on the site of the former Convent of San Francisco.
- Gran Hotel Camagüey, inaugurated in 1938.

=== Transport ===
Camagüey counts an important railway station on the main Havana-Santiago line with connections to minor lines. The station lies in the central "Avenida Van Horne", at the corner with "Avenida Finlay". The city is crossed by the Carretera Central highway and counts a beltway. The A1 motorway, that will link Havana to Guantánamo, and partly built, is in project phase in the city area.

Airports

Camagüey has its own international airport, Ignacio Agramonte International Airport located in the north-eastern suburb. Most tourists going to or leaving the Beach of Santa Lucía do so through this airport.

== Climate ==
According to the Köppen Climate Classification system, Camagüey has a tropical savanna climate, abbreviated Aw on climate maps. Since Cuba is a hotspot for tropical cyclones, it has been affected many times, like in 1932, with the 1932 Cuba hurricane. Afternoon temperatures are hot and morning temperatures mild to warm throughout the year. Rain peaks during June and is at its lowest during February.

Climate data for Camagüey
Month	Jan	Feb	Mar	Apr	May	Jun	Jul	Aug	Sep	Oct	Nov	Dec	Year
Record high °C (°F)	32.8 (91.0)	34.4 (93.9)	36.7 (98.1)	37.8 (100.0)	38.9 (102.0)	38.3 (100.9)	37.8 (100.0)	38.9 (102.0)	36.7 (98.1)	36.1 (97.0)	33.9 (93.0)	33.9 (93.0)	38.9 (102.0)
Mean daily maximum °C (°F)	27.2 (81.0)	28.3 (82.9)	30.0 (86.0)	31.7 (89.1)	31.7 (89.1)	31.7 (89.1)	32.8 (91.0)	32.8 (91.0)	32.2 (90.0)	30.6 (87.1)	28.9 (84.0)	27.8 (82.0)	30.5 (86.9)
Daily mean °C (°F)	22.2 (72.0)	23.1 (73.6)	24.5 (76.1)	25.8 (78.4)	26.4 (79.5)	26.7 (80.1)	27.5 (81.5)	27.5 (81.5)	27.0 (80.6)	25.8 (78.4)	24.2 (75.6)	22.8 (73.0)	25.3 (77.5)
Mean daily minimum °C (°F)	17.2 (63.0)	17.8 (64.0)	18.9 (66.0)	20.0 (68.0)	21.1 (70.0)	21.7 (71.1)	22.2 (72.0)	22.2 (72.0)	21.7 (71.1)	21.1 (70.0)	19.4 (66.9)	17.8 (64.0)	20.1 (68.2)
Record low °C (°F)	7.8 (46.0)	9.4 (48.9)	11.1 (52.0)	13.9 (57.0)	13.3 (55.9)	16.7 (62.1)	18.9 (66.0)	18.9 (66.0)	17.8 (64.0)	15.6 (60.1)	10.0 (50.0)	7.2 (45.0)	7.2 (45.0)
Average rainfall mm (inches)	38.1 (1.50)	35.6 (1.40)	61.0 (2.40)	91.4 (3.60)	193.0 (7.60)	266.7 (10.50)	142.2 (5.60)	139.7 (5.50)	185.4 (7.30)	137.2 (5.40)	78.7 (3.10)	50.8 (2.00)	1,419.8 (55.90)
Source: Sistema de Clasificación Bioclimática Mundial

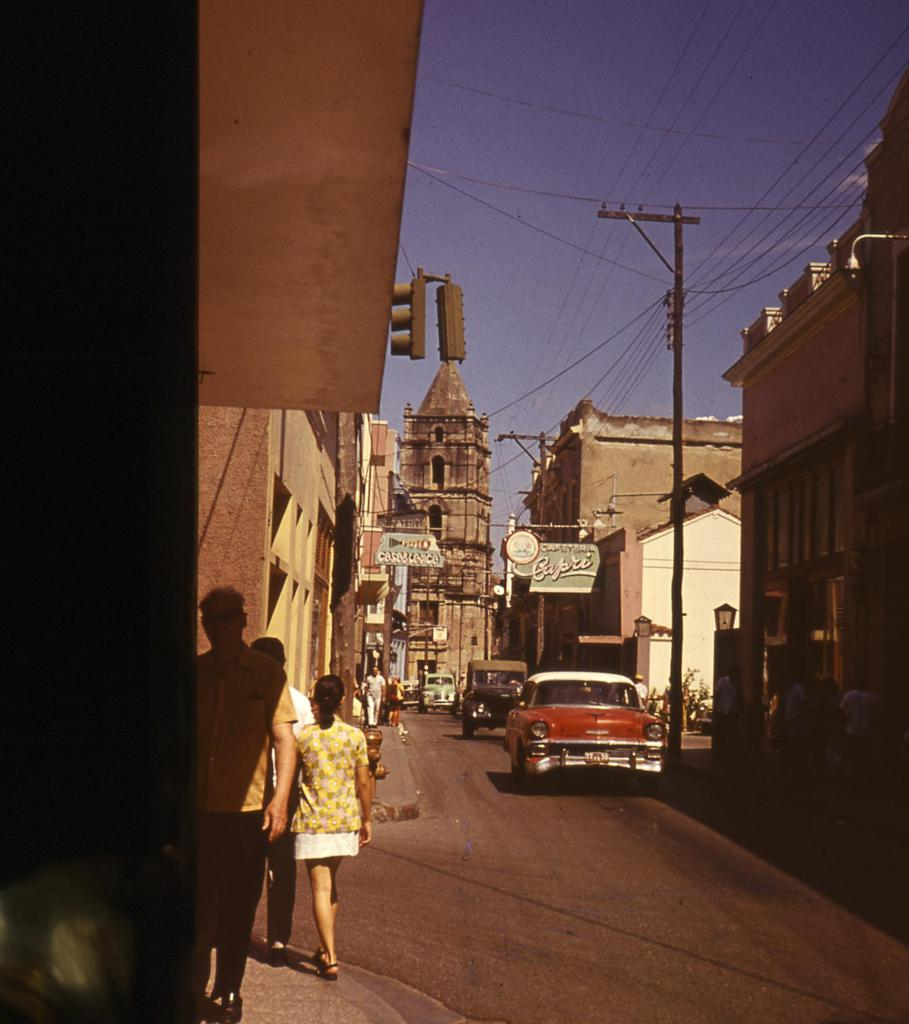
Church of la Soledad without its current color, the Old City, photo of 1974.

== Political-administrative division ==
The city is currently divided into four districts:

- Joaquín de Agüero District
- Cándido González District
- Julio Antonio Mella District
- Ignacio Agramonte District

== Sport ==
The local baseball club is Toros de Camagüey, nicknamed Alfareros ("Potters"), and its home ground is the Estadio Cándido González. The association football club is FC Camagüey and its home ground is the Estadio Patricio Lumumba.

== Education ==
=== Instituto Pre-Universitario Vocacional de Ciencias Exactas ===
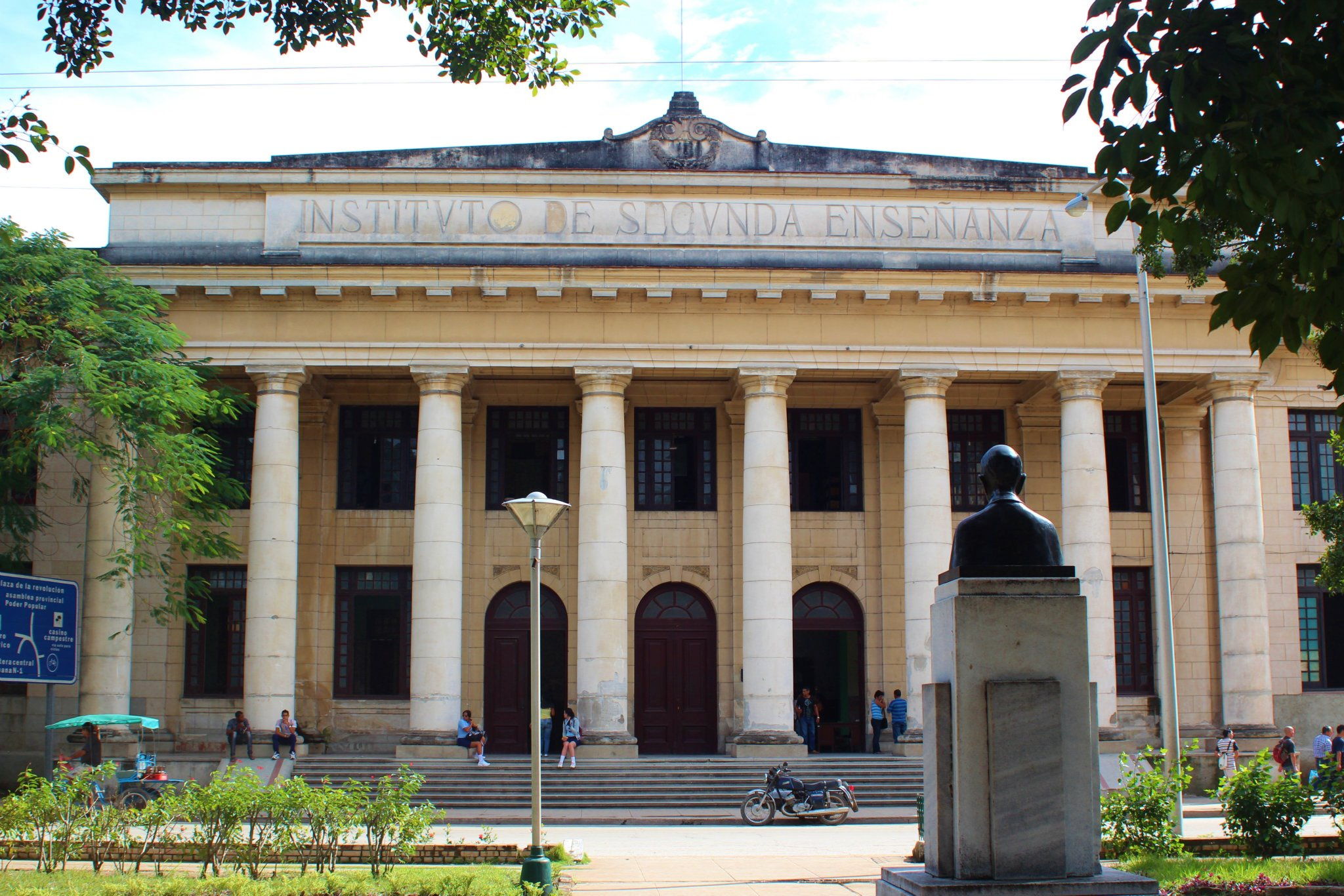
Institute of Secondary Education

Although it is not the only high school in the City, the Pre-Universitario, sometimes referred to as "Vocational School" but formally known as "Instituto Pre-Universitario Vocacional de Ciencias Exactas" (IPVCE) Máximo Gómez Báez es:Instituto Preuniversitario Vocacional de Ciencias Exactas – or, in English, Vocational Pre-University Institute of Exact Sciences Máximo Gómez Báez – is the largest of its kind in the province of Camagüey. The size of the institution qualifies it as a "learning city". This center is homologous to others existing in the rest of the country's provinces. Students usually form close bonds and lasting friendships while at the institution, but family bonds sometimes suffer and "traditional" moral attitudes tend to shift as teenagers spend weeks away from their family. To be admitted into the IPVCE, students must take an entrance exam after completing the preparation of the Basic Secondary Education (7th to 9th grade). During the following three years they receive intensive preparation in order to gain acceptance to college.

=== Other high schools ===
What is known in United States as High Schools (9-12 grade), in Cuba is called Secundaria (Secondary) from (7-9 grade) and Pre-Universitario (Pre-University) from (10-12 grade). Some relevant Secundarias in Camagüey are La Avellaneda, Torre Blanca, Javier de la Vega, Ana Betancourt de Mora, Ignacio Agramonte, and many others. In Camagüey city, there are other high schools, as well as schools for athletes (ESPA, and EIDE), for artists (The School of Art), and the Military High School "Camilo Cienfuegos" (also known as "Camilitos", in honor of Camilo Cienfuegos, hero of the Cuban Revolution).

=== University ===
The University of Camagüey, with engineering and basic and humanitarian sciences programs, is located in the city. There are a separate university college for medical education (Carlos J Finlay University of Medical Science). Since 2016, the University of Camaguey is a blending between Sports University and Pedagogical Sciences University, counting over 12 000 students and 3 000 professors.

== Notable residents ==
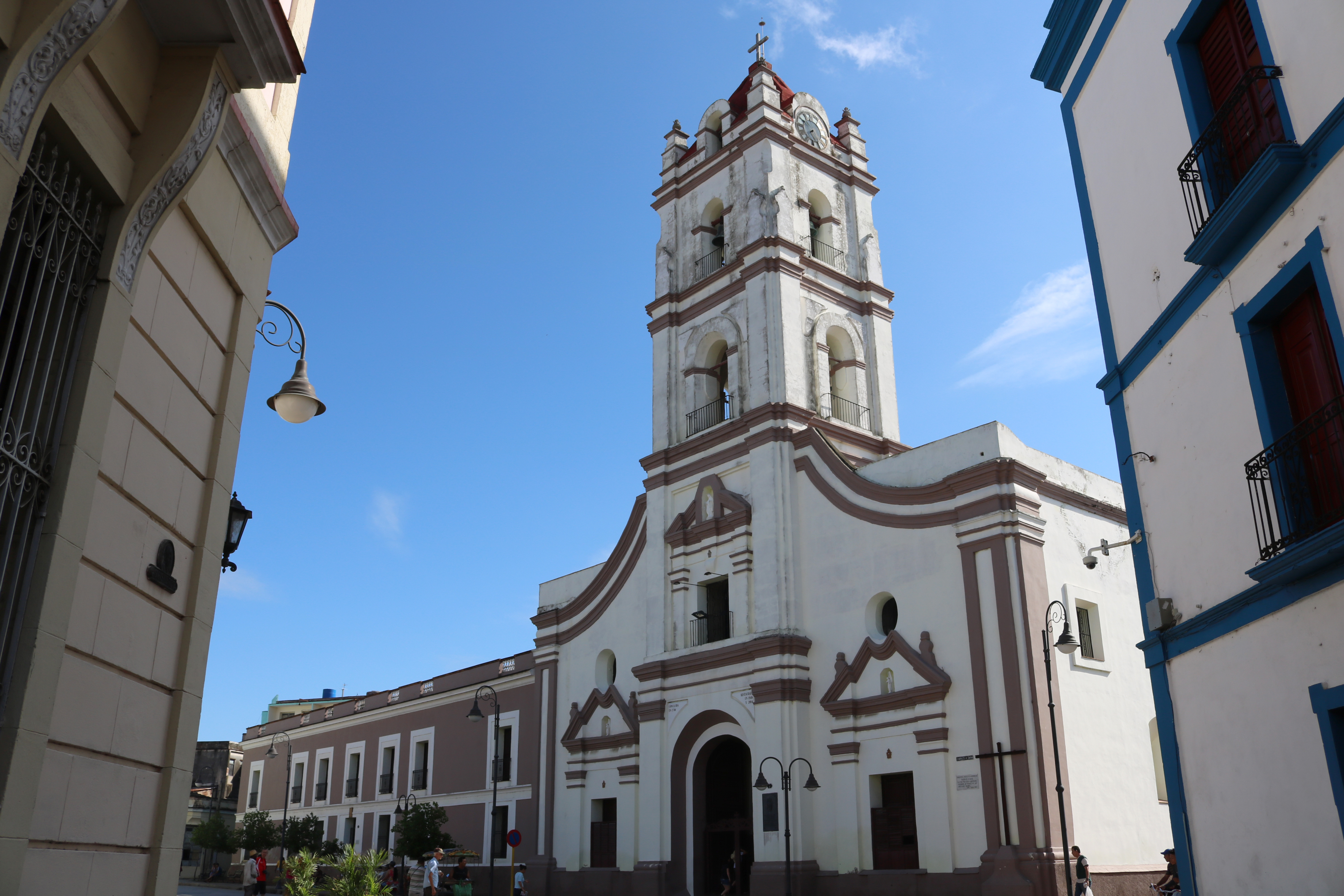
Colonial Church of Nuestra Señora de la Merced.

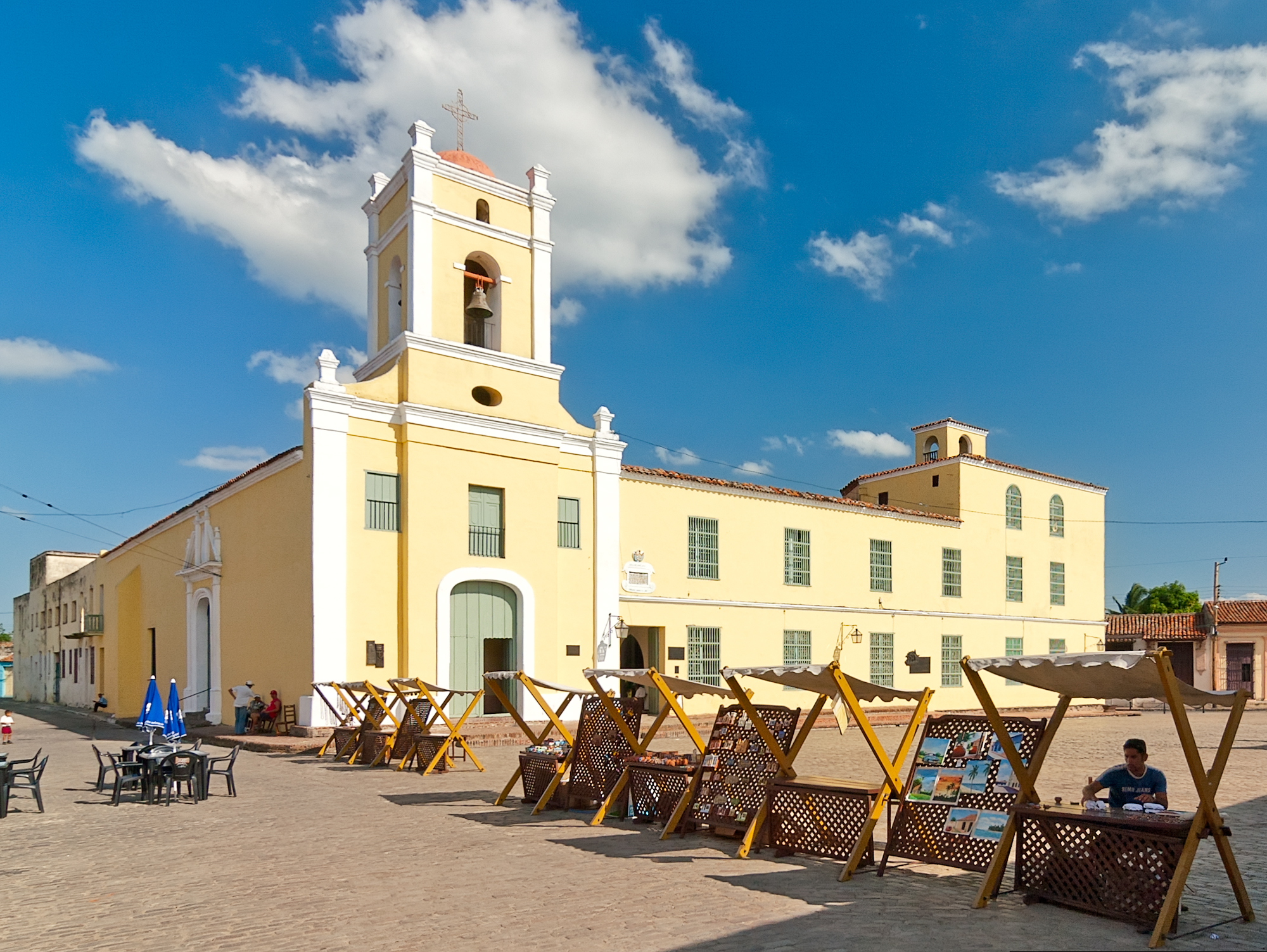
Church and Convent-Hospital San Juan de Dios, workplace of Bl. José Ollalo Valdés OH.

Camagüey is the birthplace of professional boxer Luis Ortiz (1979).

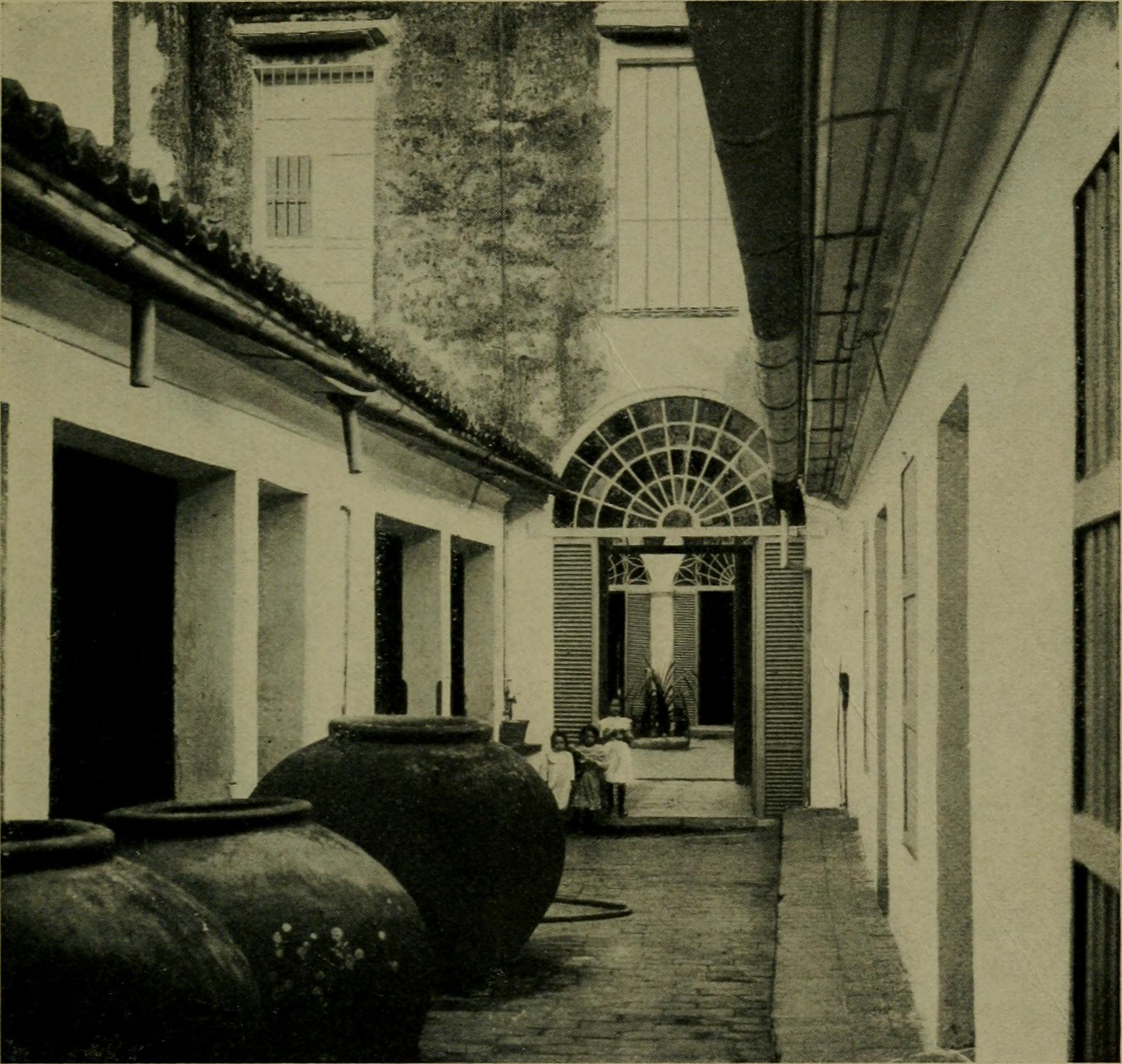
Big Clay Jars in Camagüey in 1909. "The Big Jar is the symbol of Camagüey, it is the most deeply rooted local representation since colonial times, that is why Camagüey is known as the "City of the Big Jars" (Ciudad de los Tinajones)". Photo by Munson Steamship Line.

Camagüey is also the birthplace of Ignacio Agramonte (1841), an important figure of the Ten Years' War against Spain between 1868 and 1878. Agramonte drafted the first Cuban Constitution in 1869, and later, as a Major General, formed the fearsome Camagüey cavalry corps that had the Spaniards on the run. He died in combat on 11 May 1873; his body was burned in the city because the Spanish feared the rebels would attack the city to recover his body. The Agromonte cavalry regiment of the Ejercito Libertador during the Cuban War of Independence was named after him. This regiment was set up by another notable Camagüey native, Lope Recio Loynaz, who became the first Governor of the Province of Camagūey during the Republic of Cuba.

The outline of Ignacio Agramonte's horseback statue in the Park that bears his name is a symbol of Camagüey. It was set there in 1911, uncovered by his widow, Amalia Simoni.

Visial artists include José Iraola, a contemporary painter who was born in Camagüey, on 19 September 1961; sculptor Roberto Estopiñán, born in Camagüey in 1921; and artist Juan Boza, born in Camagüey in 1941.

Poets and writers include Brígida Agüero y Agüero (1837-1866), Domitila García Doménico de Coronado (1847-1938), Emelina Peyrellade Zaldívar (1842-1877) and "The Poet of the Revolution" Raúl Rivero (1945-2021). A street in the city has been named for Agüero.

The city is the birthplace of Major League Baseball Hall of Fame member Atanasio Perez Rigal (Tony Pérez), who won two World Series titles with the Cincinnati Reds and was the 1967 All Star Game MVP.

The city is also the birthplace of the Cuban national poet Nicolás Guillén, and of Carlos J. Finlay, an outstanding physician and scientist, who first identified the Aedes aegyptis mosquito as the vector of yellow fever.

Camagüey is also the hometown of volleyball player Mireya Luis, Gertrudis Gomez de Avellanada (poet), Silvestre de Balboa (1563–1649, writer), Salvador Cisneros Betancourt, Marqués de Santa Lucia (Cuban patriot, signatory of the Guaimaro Constitution of 1869 and President of the Cuban Republic in Arms).

Brother José Olallo Valdés OH worked there, and was beatified in the city on 29 November 2008.

Olympic champion amateur boxer at 75 kg in Sydney 2000 was Jorge Gutiérrez Espinosa, born on 18 September 1975 in Camagüey.

It is the birthplace of the Cuban writer Severo Sarduy, a member of the European intellectual community that consolidated in the 1960s behind Tel Quel, a journal of critical thought. Sarduy, censored in Cuba throughout the 20th century, lived in Paris as an exile from 1960 until his death in 1993. He holds the position within literary history of having reformulated the transatlantic reconfigurations of the Hispanic Baroque aesthetic under the term "Neobaroque".

== Gallery ==
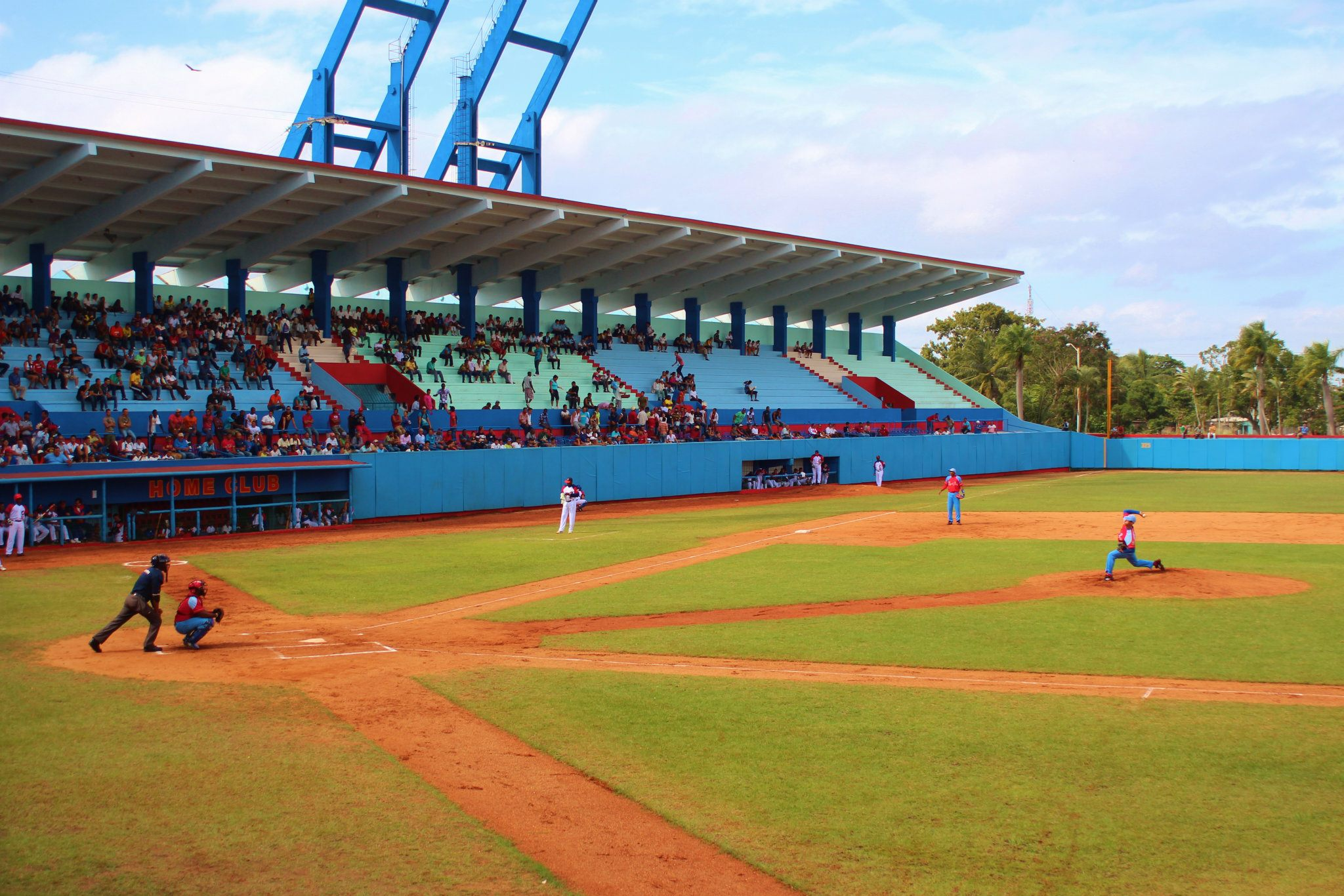
Camagüey's Baseball Stadium

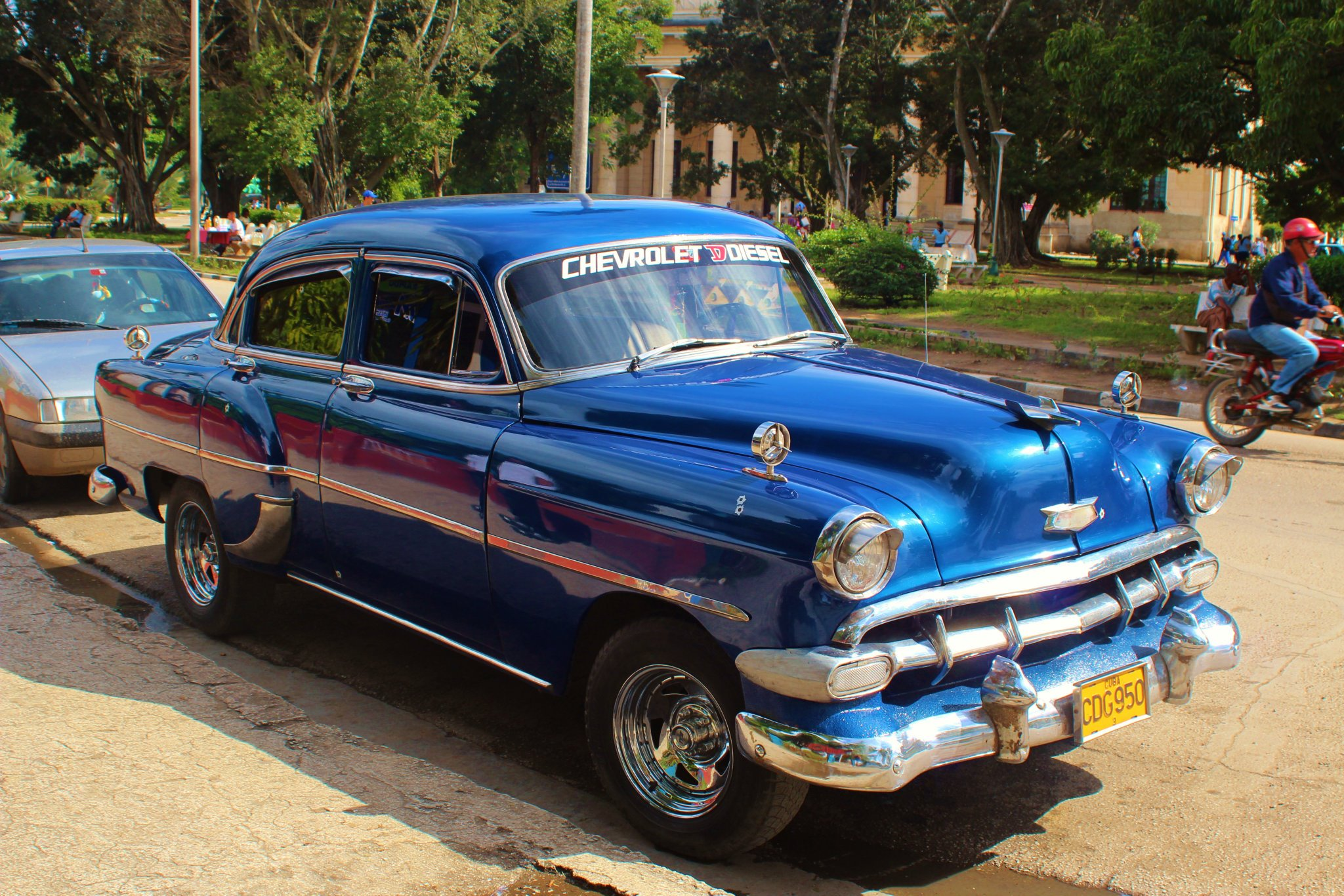
A classic car in Camagüey

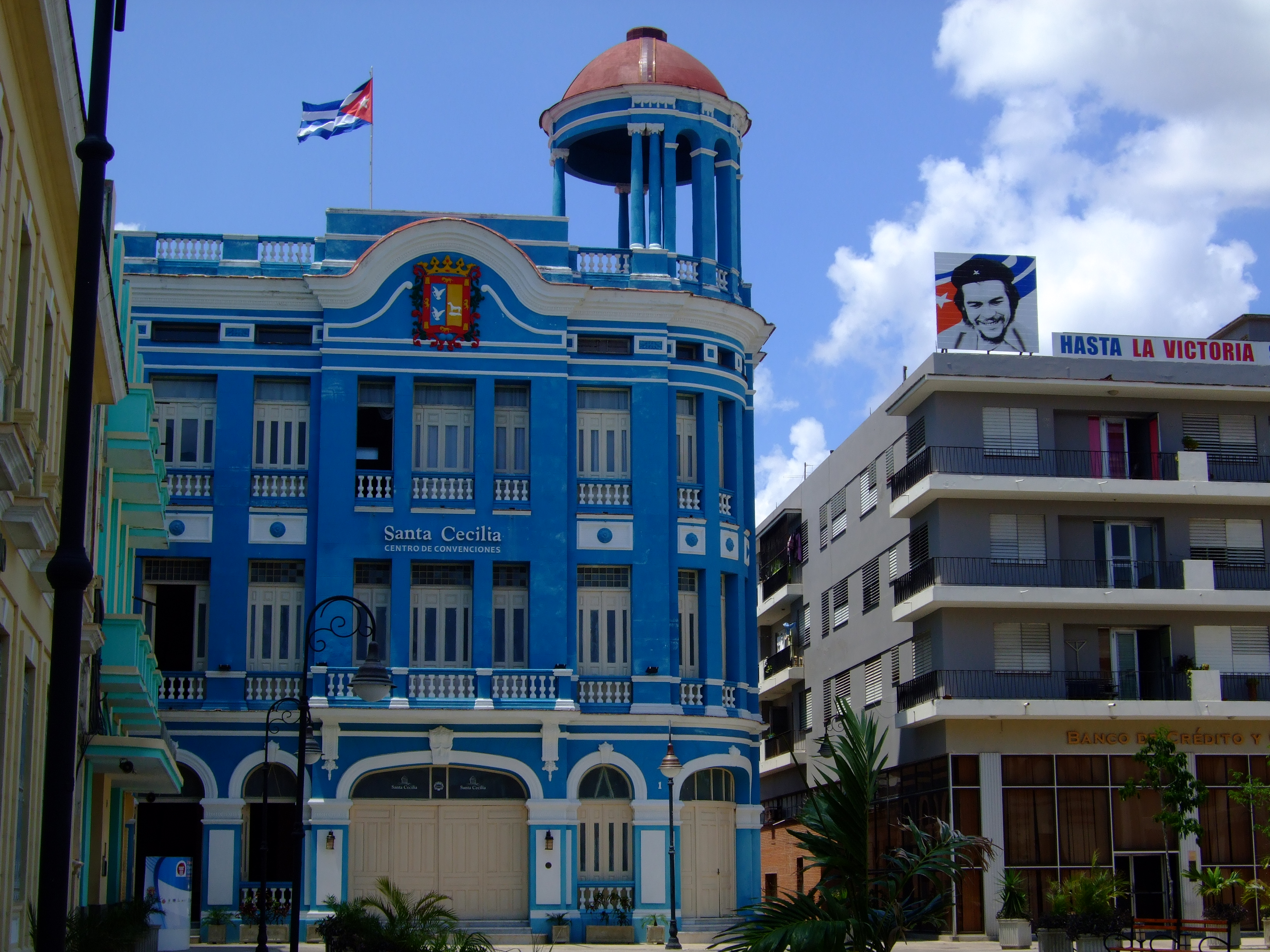
Plaza de los Trabajadores

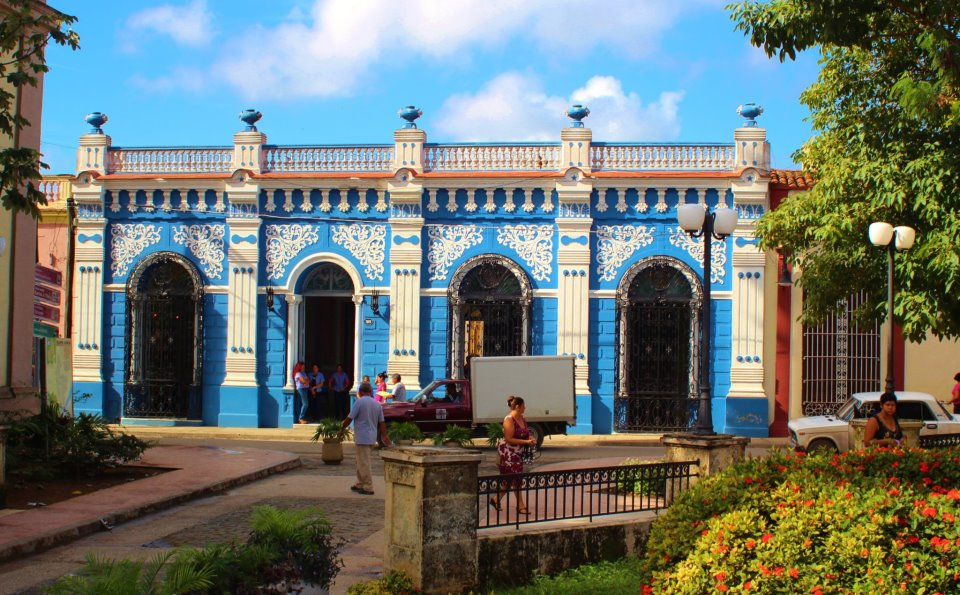
Rovirosa Palace, as has original details of the facades of many houses in the city.

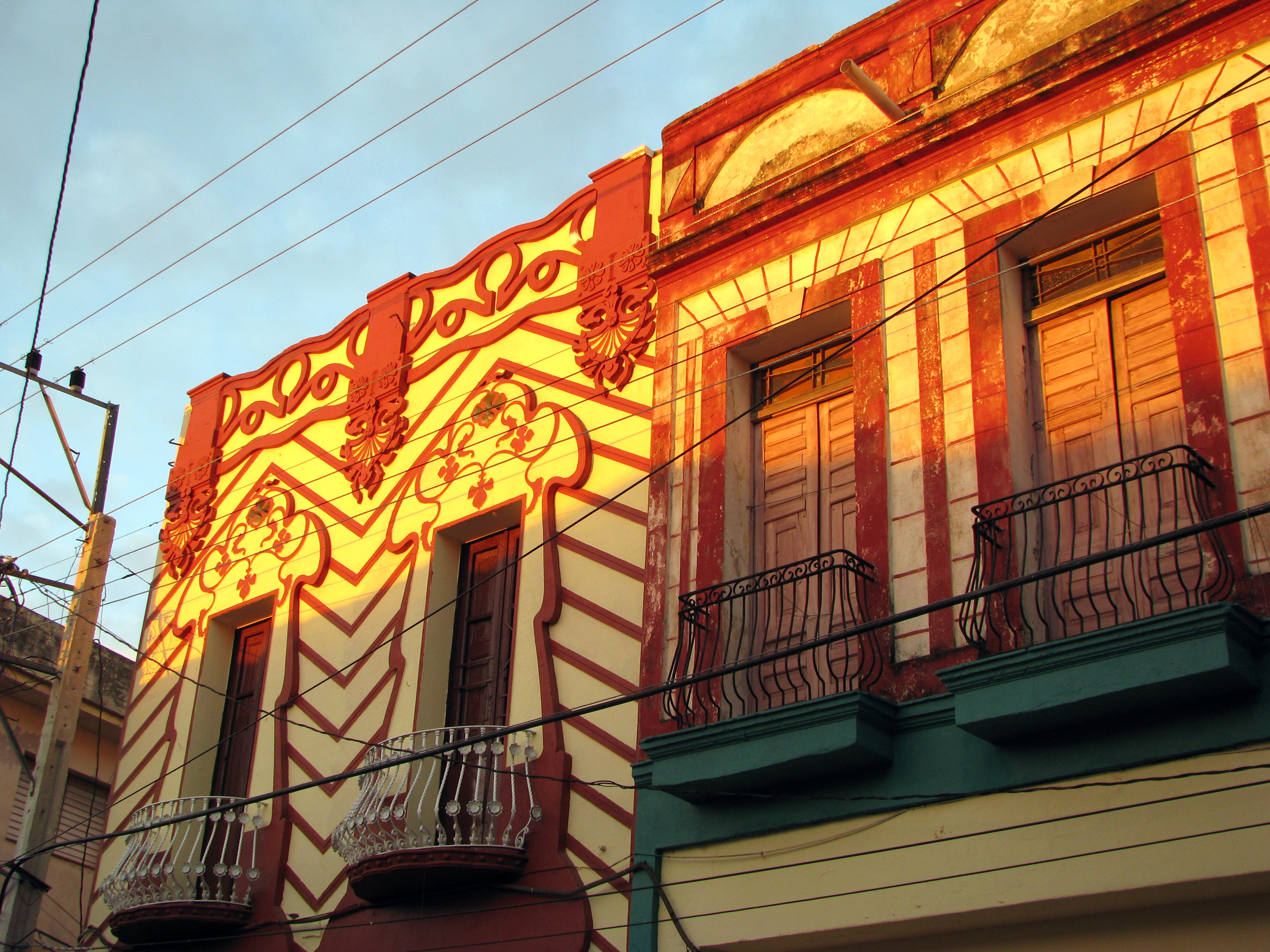

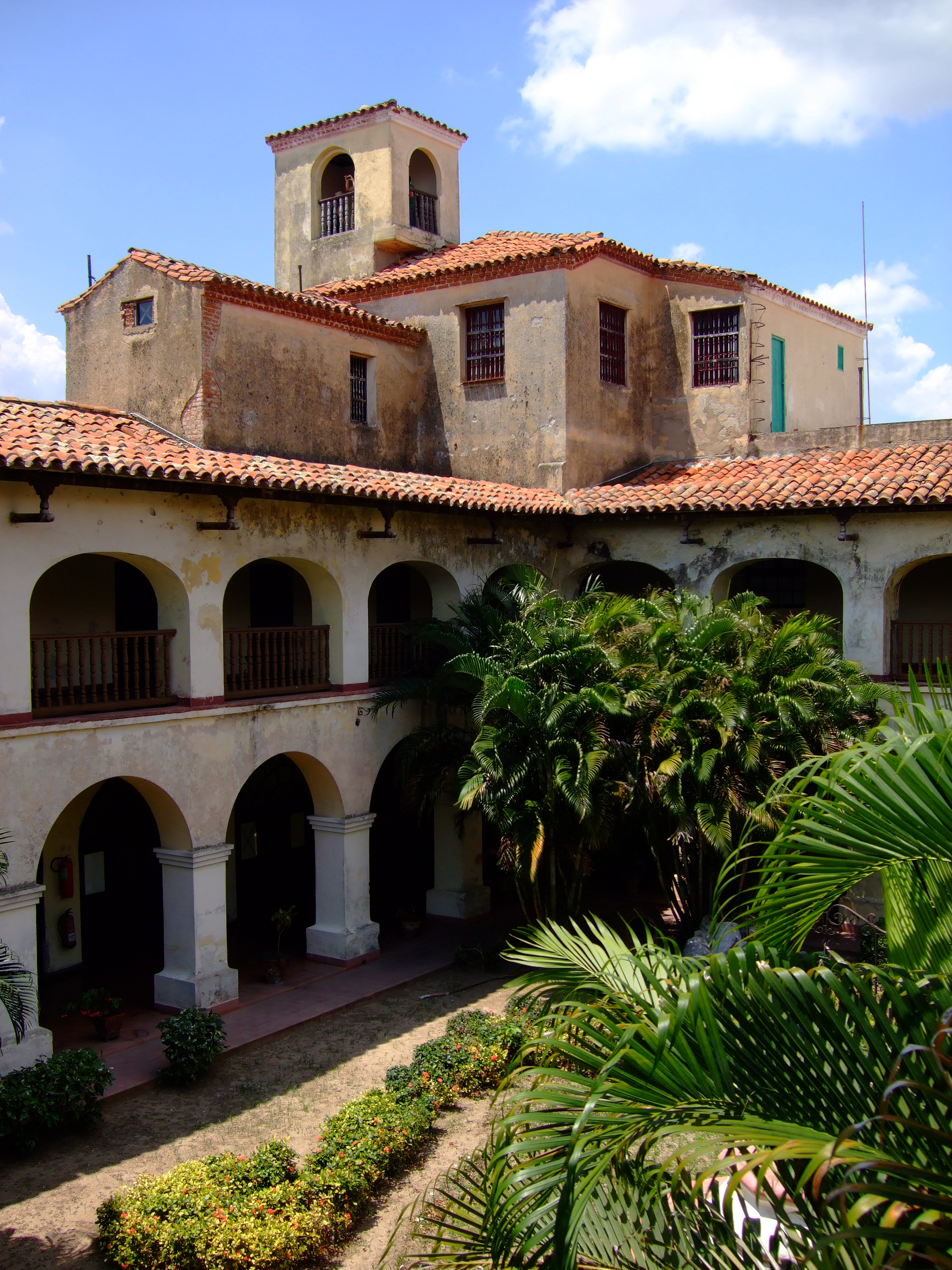
Museum of San Juan de Dios

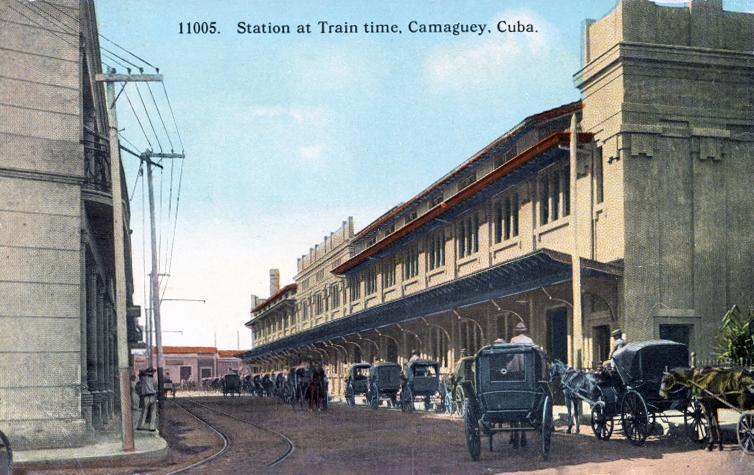
Train station of Camagüey, postcard of 1910.

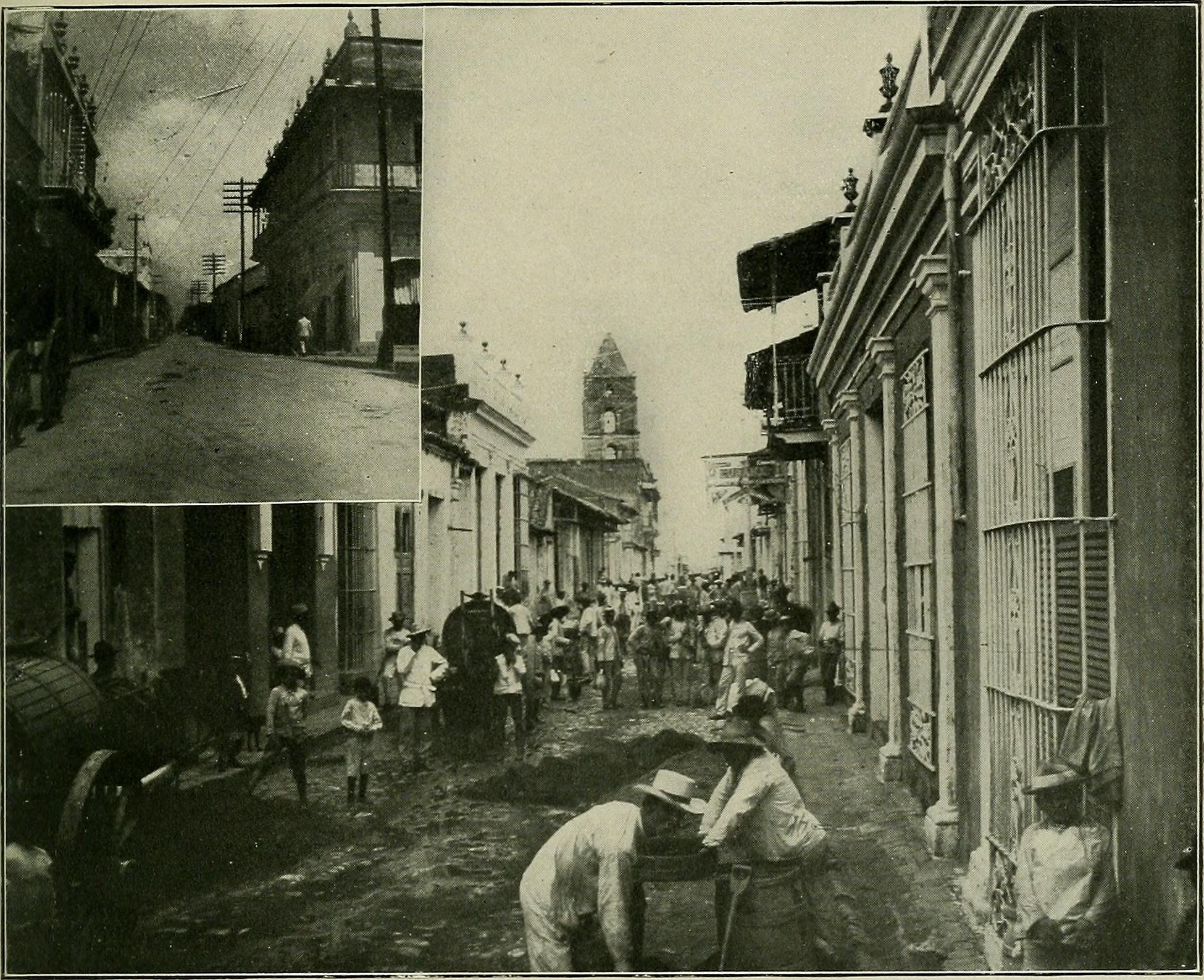
Workers paving the roads of the streets of Camagüey in 1904. Munson Steamship Line.

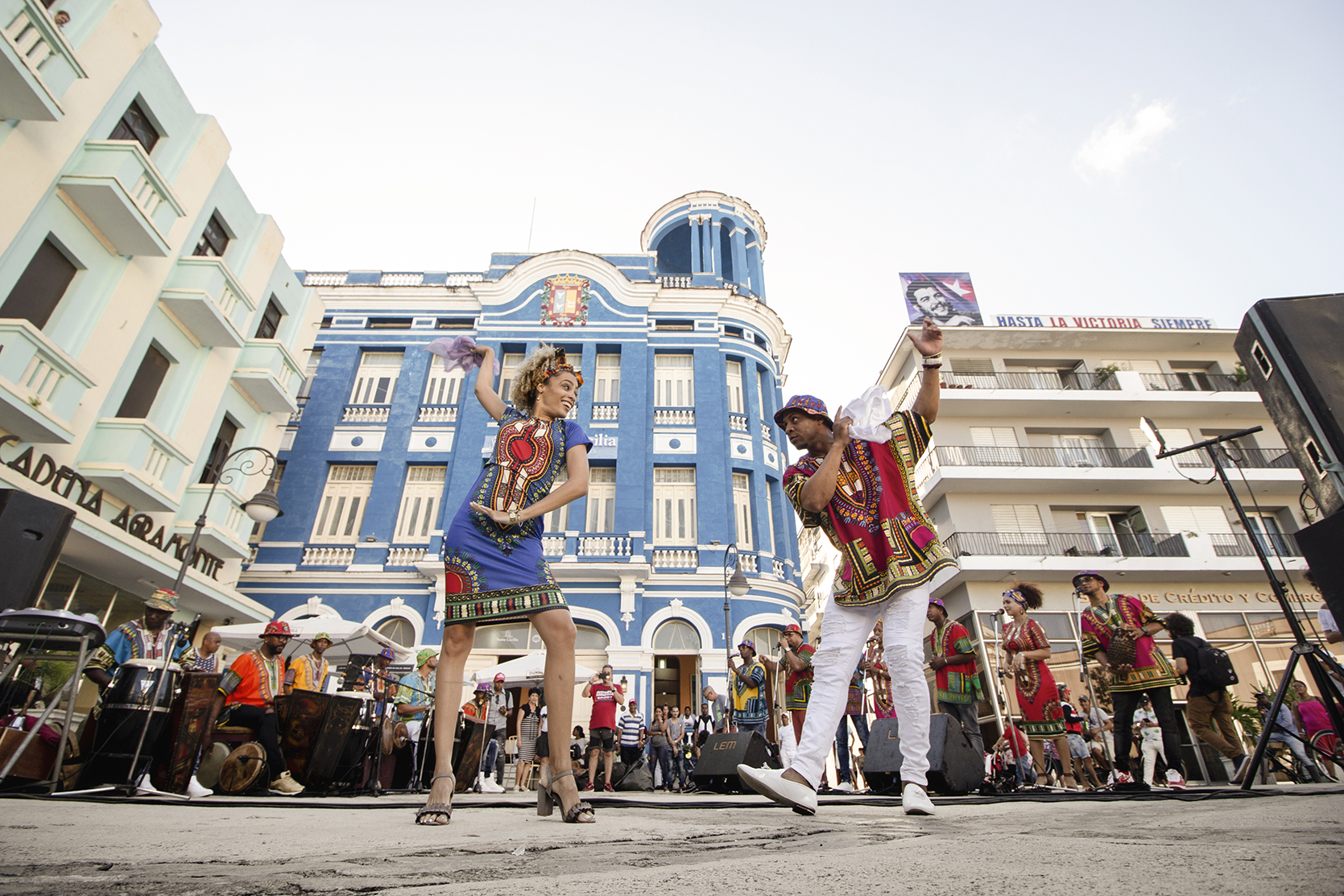
Dancers of Rumba Cubana in Camagüey, 2019.

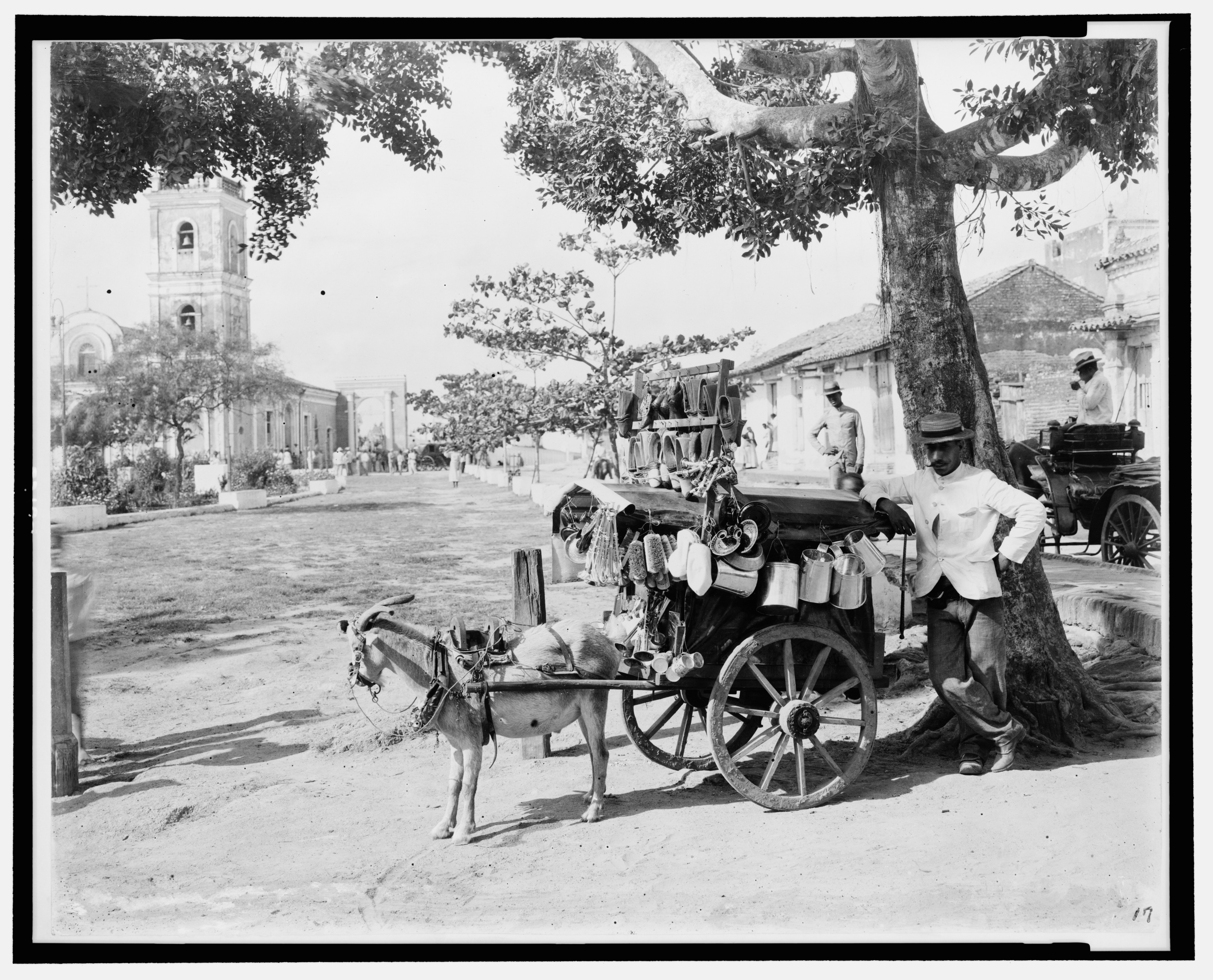
Goat wagon peddler at the Plaza del Cristo with Church of Christ in Background, in 1895.

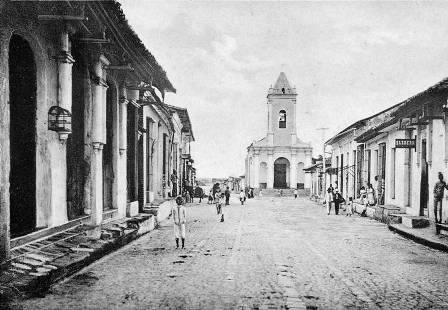
Church of Santa Ana, Camaguey, in 1889.

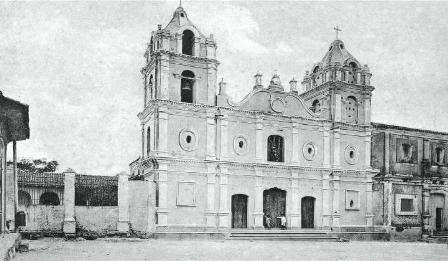
Church of Nuestra Señora del Carmen, in 1889.

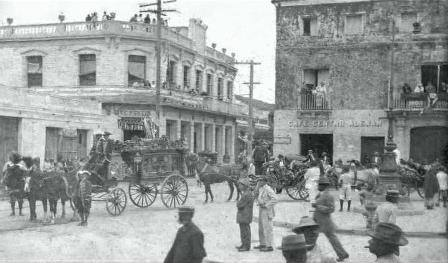
A street in Camaguey, in 1889.

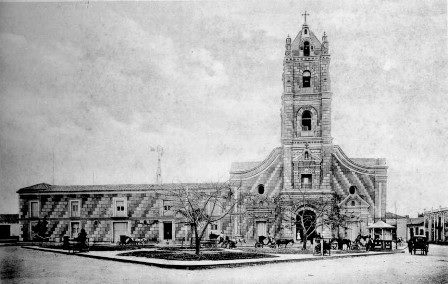
Other church in Camaguey, in 1889, Cuba

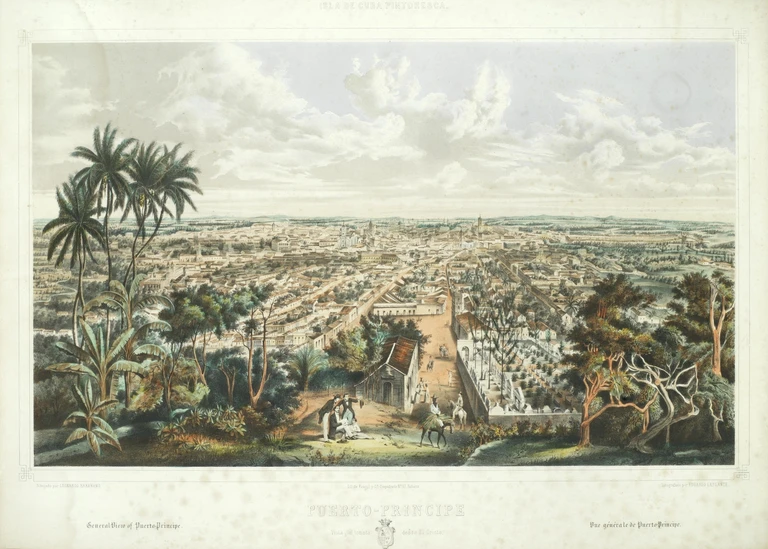
Puerto del Príncipe (current Camagüey) view taken from El Cristo, in 1856 by French-born Édouard Laplante and Leonardo Barañano. Firestone Library, Princeton University.

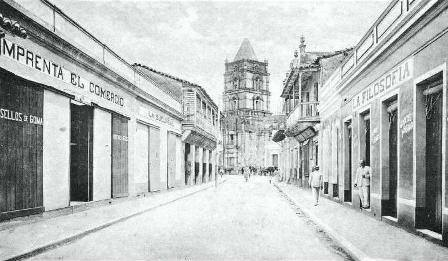
Church of Nuestra Señora de la Soledad, in 1889

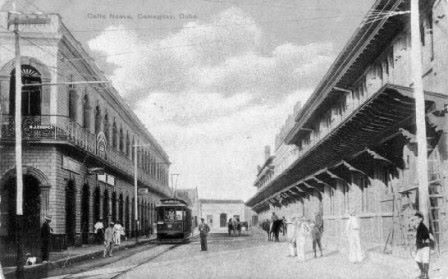
A central street in Camagüey in 1889.

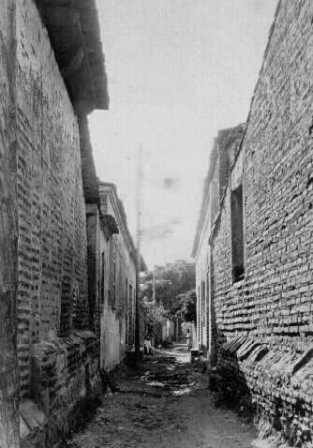
Maze passageways in the layout of Camagüey, photo of 1889.

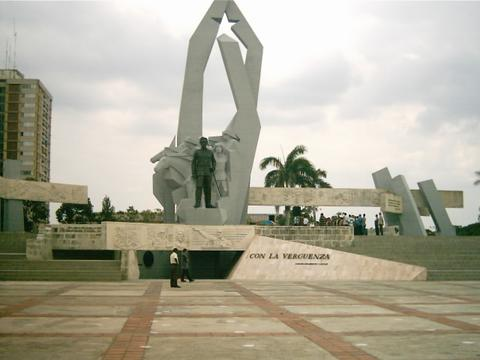
Plaza de la Revolución Ignacio Agramonte.

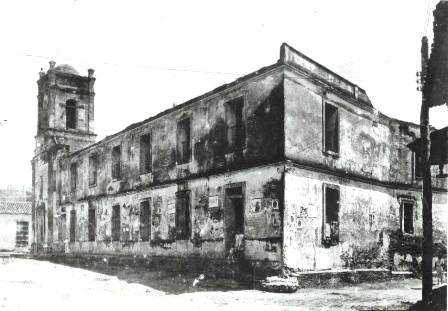
An old church in Camagüey, photo of 1889.

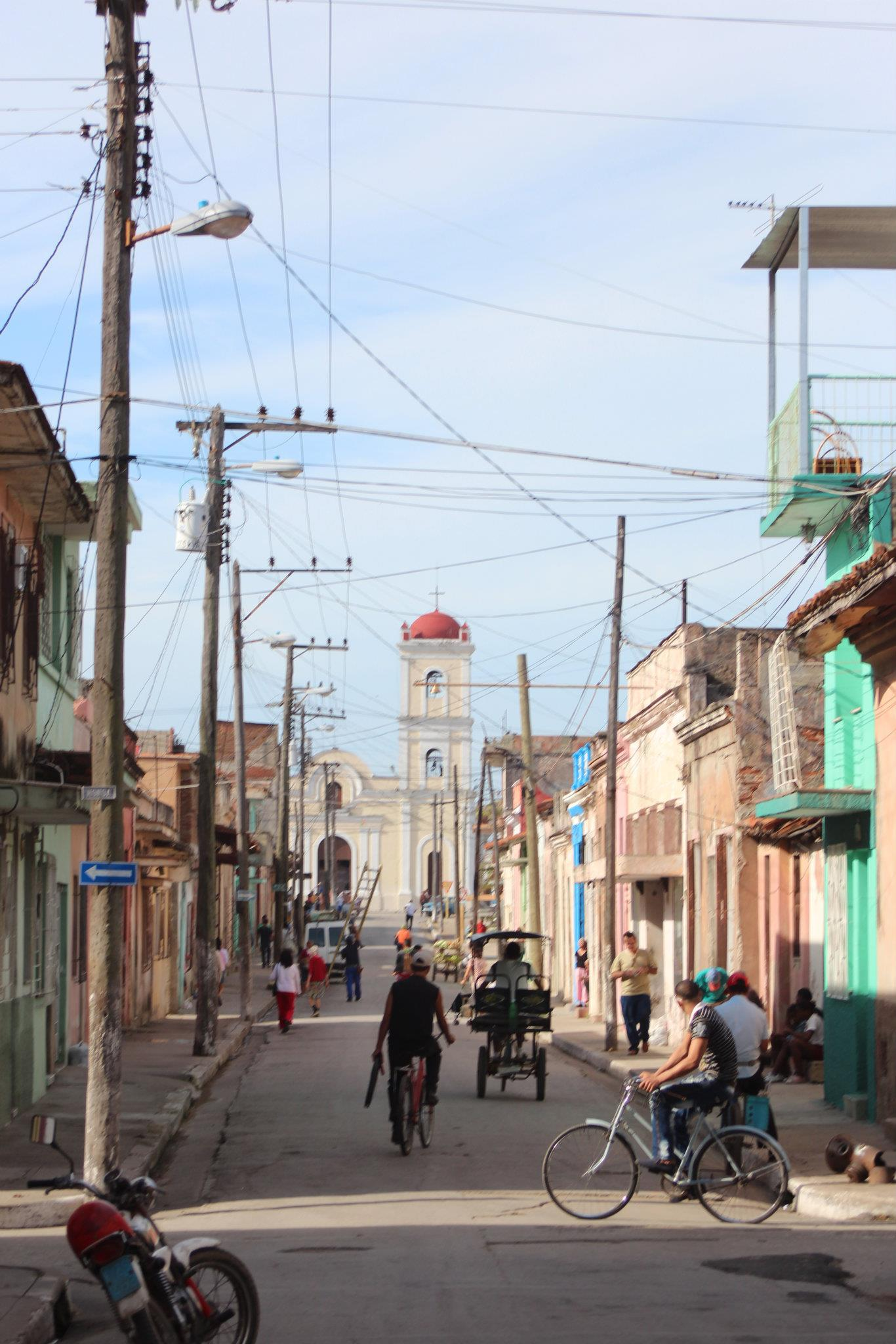
Calle Cristo, Camagüey

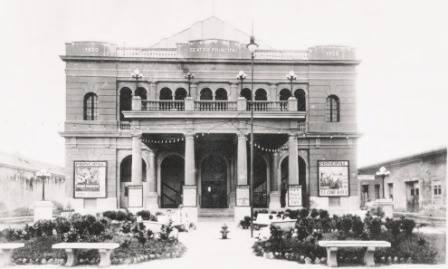
A building in Camagüey, in 1889.

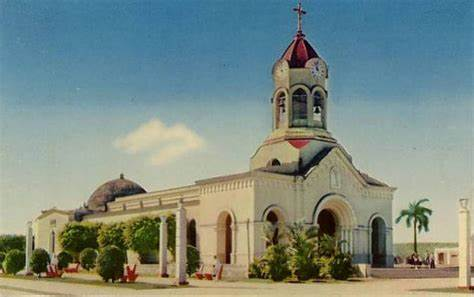
Church of Nuestra Señora de la Caridad, postcard of 1946.

== See also ==
- List of cities in Cuba
- Municipalities of Cuba
- University of Camagüey
