= María Collado Romero =

Cuban journalist, poet, and feminist

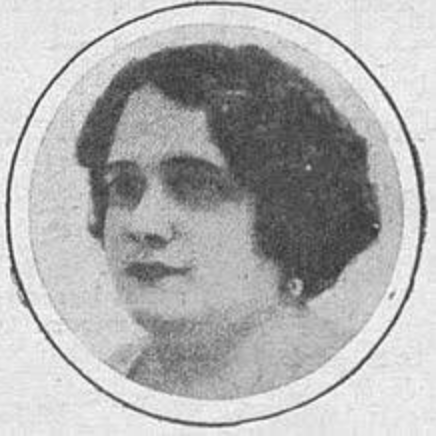
- Born: María Josefa de la Santísima Trinidad Collado Romero; 19 March 1885; Cimmarones, Matanzas Province, Captaincy General of Cuba, Spanish Empire
- Died: c. 1968
- Occupations: Journalist; Poet
- Writing career
- Pen name: Orquídea; Margarita del Campo; Margarita Silvestre
- Years active: 1913 – c. 1960
- Notable awards: Enrique José Varona prize; Álvaro Reynoso prize; Víctor Muñoz prize

María Collado Romero (19 March 1885 – c. 1968) was a Cuban journalist, poet, and feminist. She was the first female news reporter and parliamentary reporter in Cuba. She was the creator and president of the Democratic Suffragist Party of Cuba.

== Biography ==
María Josefa de la Santísima Trinidad Collado Romero was born in central Cimmarones (now the municipality Carlos Rojas) in Matanzas Province, which was formerly part of La Habana Province. She was part of an upper-class family.

== Early publications ==
She began her career in journalism in 1913, though she encountered difficulties due to the machismo which was prevalent at the time. She published her first articles about women's rights in the magazine Protectora de la Mujer. In 1920 she was named publicity director of the Women's Club.

In 1924, the president of the National Suffragist Party, Amalia Mallén, named Collado her vice president. Later, due to differences around the party's position with respect to President Gerardo Machado, Collado left to form her own Democratic Suffragist Party, of which she was the first president.

Later she was editor of the women's page of the journal La Discusión. She also worked at La Noche as parliamentary reporter and reporter in the Presidential Palace. She contributed to the newspapers Heraldo Liberal and La Tarde, and to the magazine Bohemia. She wrote articles for El Diario de la Marina and for the journal Diez de Octubre, an organ of the Merchants' Association of the municipality Diez de Octubre. She worked at the RHC-Cadena Azul News and at 1010 News. She founded the newscast CMBY.

In 1929 Collado founded and edited the magazine La Mujer, which was active until 1942. This made it the longest-running feminist publication of pre-Revolutionary Cuba.

She contributed to various journals and magazines in Havana. She was twice awarded the Enrique José Varona prize, and also received Álvaro Reynoso and Víctor Muñoz prizes.

She worked on the newscasts Radio Continental, Patria Nueva (1917–1918), Cuba Nueva, and La Lucha, under the pseudonyms Orquídea, Margarita del Campo, and Margarita Silvestre.

For much of her life Collado lived in Diez de Octubre, on Lacret Street between the streets San Francisco and Centurión.

At her behest, the Grau government renamed Chaple Street for General Lacret, in honor of that distinguished mambí. A monument to him was also erected on Lacret and Vía Blanca.

== Feminism ==
Collado was known as a tenacious feminist. In the magazine Protectora de Mujeres she advocated the creation of laws for the protection of women, with numerous articles published in the national press and abroad. She fought vigorously for the equality of women, defending their right to vote. She participated actively in the Club Femenino de Cuba.

She worked hard in favor of rural working women. In 1922 she initiated the creation of the Women's Agricultural School, which later became the Rosalía Abreu school. She fought for women's right to work in commerce. To this end she became a voluntary inspector, and was later the first person to be designated an official trade inspector.

The conflict between María Collado (leader of the suffragists) and Pilar Morlon (leader of the feminists) was used by the conservative press to argue that women were still not ready to become citizens and vote.

== Parliamentary reporter ==
María Collado worked as a parliamentary reporter for various radio stations and print media for the better part of the Republic's neocolonial period.

In 1940, under the government of dictator Fulgencio Batista, Collado was banned from the group of reporters covering news at the Presidential Palace. Between 1944 and 1948, during the presidency of Ramón Grau, the press spokesman at the Presidential Palace denied her accreditation. In her complaint she explained that the discrimination was due to "my being a woman, and perhaps a decent woman." On another occasion, the Minister of Public Works invited reporters to visit specific sites in his sector, but when María Collado was about to take the vehicle to leave the ministry, he blocked her, saying, "This trip is not for women."

Once, an invitation was extended to journalists to cover a lunch session of the Senate, but Collado was excluded. The next day she asked for an explanation and the journalist Cabús, director of Diario de Sesiones del Senado, told her that it had been a relaxing party which women could not attend, and that she should realize that women in journalism got in the way and were a disaster.

She supported the Law of the Chair (Spanish: Ley de la Silla), which forced businesses to let women sit. She also presented a request for businesses to close at noon for employees to have lunch.

She advised many women starting in journalism before the creation of the Manuel Márquez Sterling school. Her magazine La Mujer (Havana) helped to prepare many young female journalists of the 1930s.

Collado won the Varona and Víctor Muñoz journalism prizes. At the end of the Cuban Revolution, María Collado had retired from journalism, but she still joined the ranks of the Federation of Cuban Women (Spanish: Federación de Mujeres Cubanas; FMC), founded in 1960 as part of the Communist Party of Cuba, where she witnessed the full incorporation of women into society which she had struggled for all her life.

== Death ==
She died as a resident of the municipality Diez de Octubre in the second half of the 1960s.

== Sources ==
- Núñez Machín, Ana: Mujeres en el periodismo cubano (1989-2010) [Women in Cuban journalism (1989-2010)]. Santiago, Cuba: Oriente, 2010.
- Villa Hernández, Hilda: Mujeres destacadas del municipio Diez de Octubre (1689–1998) [Prominent women of the municipality Diez de Octubre (1689-1998)]. Havana: Centro de Superación para la Cultura, 1998.
