= Domitila García de Coronado =

Cuban writer, journalist, editor, professor (1847–1938)

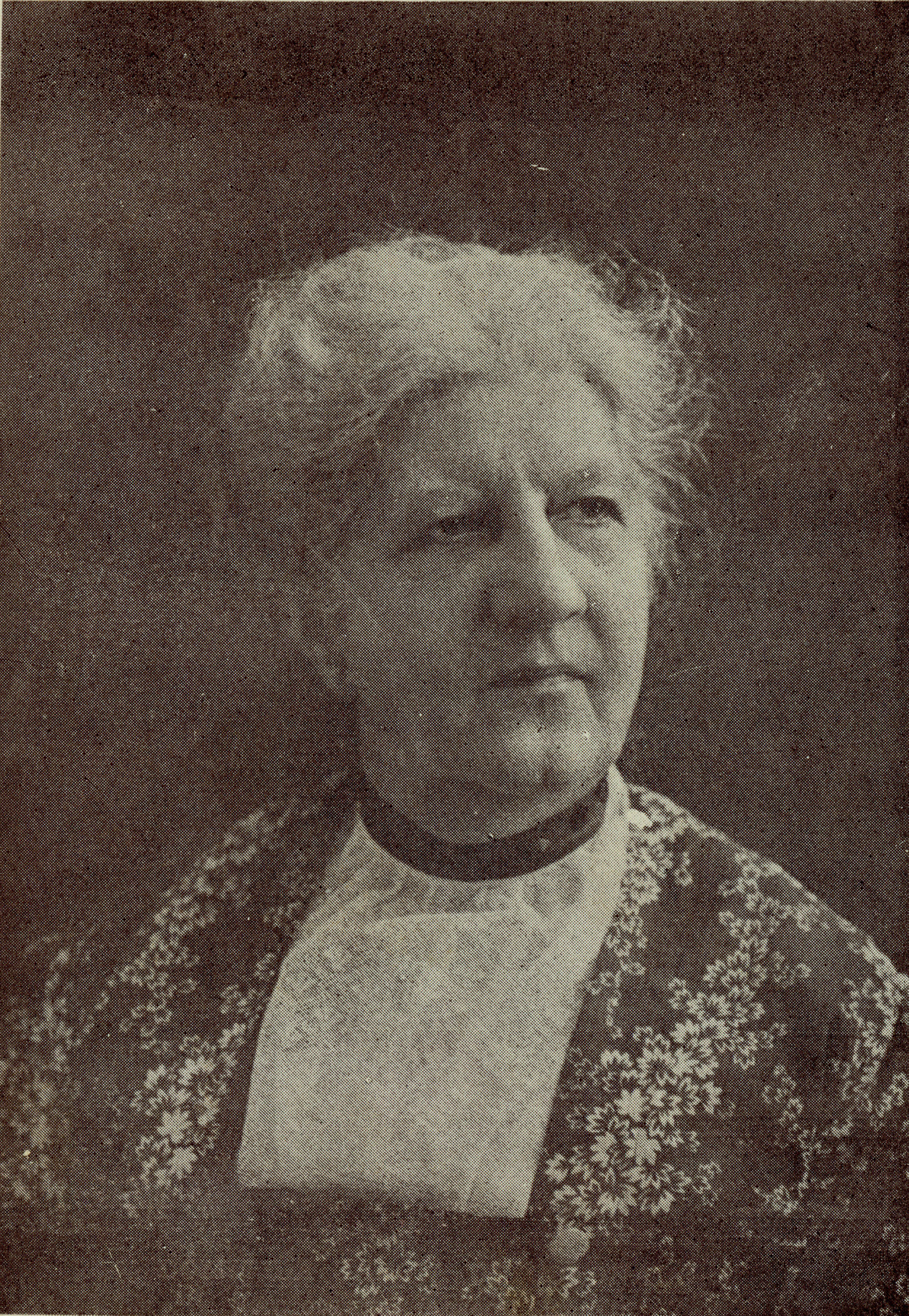
- Born: Domitila García Doménico; 7 May 1847; Camagüey, Captaincy General of Cuba, Spanish Empire
- Died: 1938 (aged 90–91); Havana, Republic of Cuba
- Occupations: Writer; Journalist; Professor
- Spouse: Tomás Coronado
- Writing career
- Language: Spanish
- Genre: Essay
- Notable work: Álbum poético fotográfico de escritoras cubanas.

Domitila García Doménico de Coronado (7 May 1847 – 1938) (Note: Some authors list her year of death as 1937.) was a Cuban writer, journalist, editor, and professor, considered to be the first women to practice journalism in her country.

== Biography ==
Domitila García Doménico de Coronado was born on 7 May 1847 in Camagüey, Cuba.

On 17 May 1891, she founded the Academy of Women Typographers. She founded and edited various publications, including the journals La Antorcha and El Céfiro together with Sofía Estevez (1848–1901). Besides these, she was editor of La Mujer, together with Aída Peláez de Villa Urrutia and Isabel Margarita Ordetx.

She also published the first anthology of Cuban women writers in 1868, titled Álbum poético fotográfico de escritoras cubanas (Poetic photo album of Cuban women writers), which included the biography of Emelina Peyrellade Zaldívar, a 19th-century writer and translator and of Brígida Agüero y Agüero (1837–1866), a 19th-century poet from Camagüey.
