= Carmen Velacoracho de Lara =

Spanish-cuban writer and journalist

- Born: 1880s La Solana, Spain
- Died: 1960; Madrid, Spain
- Occupations: Writer; Journalist; Editor; Feminist activist
- Spouse: Pío Fernández de Lara Zalda
- Children: Carmen Fernández de Lara
- Writing career
- Notable work: El libro amarillo

Carmen Velacoracho de Lara (1880s–1960) was a Spanish-Cuban writer, journalist, feminist, monarchist, and women's rights activist. She was co-author of El libro amarillo (The yellow book), a pro-feminist manifesto published in Cuba in the early 20th century, which she drafted along with her husband, landowner Pío Fernández de Lara Zalda.

With Digna Collazo, she founded the Feminist Party in 1918, as well as the women's organization Aspiraciones (Aspirations) in Cuba at the beginning of the 20th century. She also was director of various women's publications, including the newspaper Aspiraciones (which she founded in 1912) and the magazines Realidades, La voz de la mujer, and Revista Protectora de la Mujer. Besides these she was editor-in-chief of Mujeres Españolas, a magazine founded in 1929.

During the 1920s Velacoracho left Cuba for a time to live in the United States.

1928 saw the Havana premiere of El descubrimiento de América (The discovery of America), a film she had directed. It received a prize at the first Spanish Congress of Cinematography in Madrid the same year.

In 1931, together with her daughter, she joined Popular Action, and in 1932 she began the publication of Aspiraciones in Spain, under their joint direction. She spent some time in jail for having sympathized with the Sanjurjada coup.

Velacoracho was an active antisemitic propagandist during the Second Republic, and in the early years of Francoist Spain she also published antisemitic and anti-American tirades, even claiming that the Jews controlled the United States. However this conspiracy theory did not make a large impression on the bulk of Falangists.

During World War II, her open antisemitism led her to become a Nazi sympathizer. She wrote two biographies of Adolf Hitler, whom she characterized as a champion of Christianity.

She died in Madrid in 1960.

== Works ==
- Dos hombres: Mussolini y Hitler (Madrid, Editora Aspiraciones, 1943)
- Un caudillo (Madrid: Imprenta Europa, 1943)
