= José Iraola =

Cuban artist

José Sánchez Iraola
- Born: September 19, 1961; Camagüey, Cuba
- Occupation: Artist

José Sánchez Iraola (born Camagüey, Cuba, September 19, 1961) is a contemporary painter.

== Personal life ==
He attended the Escuela Nacional de Bellas Artes San Alejandro in Havana, Cuba from 1986 but didn't formally finish the programme. At the age of 26 he left Cuba and resided in Madrid, Spain from 1987 until he moved to Miami, Florida in 1989.

== Individual exhibitions ==
In January 1987 Iraola had a solo show called Jugamos con los dioses at Domingo Ravenet Gallery in Havana. In 1990 his exhibition Caja Postal was shown in Madrid. Since 1993 he has often worked with Luis Marín, exhibiting together twice in Ecuador at the Sala de Arte Contemporaneo of the Museo Municipal de Guayaquil and at the Museo Municipal de Arte Moderno in Cuenca in 1993. In 1995, the artists exhibited Posibles Orígenes y Mitos from April 19 to May 6 at La Galería in Quito, Ecuador and in 1997 they showed Presencia Cubana en Los Angeles at the Antioch University in Los Angeles, California.

== Group exhibitions ==
The artist was invited to the Salón Playa that took place at the Galería Servando Cabrera Moreno in Havana, in December 1985. In September 1991 Iraola showed some of his work in Abstractions at the Inter American Gallery at the Wolfson Campus of Miami Dade Community College, in Miami. In 1994 he participated in The Afro Cuban My at the Barbara Greene Gallery in Miami, and he also was a member of the 9 Cuban American Artists at the Kingsborough Community College Art Gallery, City University of New York, in Brooklyn, New York.

== Collections ==
Some of his paintings are in the collections of the Antioch University in Los Angeles; the Diners Club Collection in Quito, Ecuador; the Housatonic Museum of Art, Bridgeport, Connecticut, and the Instituto Cultural Peruano Norteamericano in Lima, Peru. The Modern Art Museum of Cuenca, Ecuador has also acquired some of his canvases as well as the Museum of Art in Fort Lauderdale, Florida.

== Awards ==
He won an important award at Soho Art Competition No. 9. at the Ariel Gallery, Soho, New York.
