= List of shipwrecks in August 1880 =

The list of shipwrecks in August 1880 includes ships sunk, foundered, grounded, or otherwise lost during August 1880.

== 1 August ==
List of shipwrecks: 1 August 1880
Ship	State	Description
County of Sutherland	United Kingdom	The steamship ran aground in the River Thames at Erith, Kent. She was on a voyage from London to Colombo, Ceylon. She was refloated and resumed her voyage.
Edani	Italy	The barque collided with the steamship Harter (United Kingdom) and sank off Málaga, Spain. Her crew were rescued. Edani was on a voyage from Gorée, Senegal to Marseille, Bouches-du-Rhône, France.
Idem	United Kingdom	The barque collided with the steamship Harter (Flag unknown) off Gibraltar and sank. Her crew were rescued. Idem was on a voyage from China to New York, United States.
Johann Winchhorst	Germany	The barque was wrecked on the English Bank, in the River Plate. Her crew were rescued.
Ocean Queen	Grenada	The sloop foundered off Monlinier Point, Grenada with the loss of three of the 23 people on board. She was on a voyage from St. Georges to Grenville.
Wastwater	United Kingdom	The barque was destroyed by fire in the Atlantic Ocean. Her 24 crew were rescued by the full-rigged ship A. H. van Tienhoven (Netherlands) and the barque Antonia Vincent (United Kingdom). Wastwater was on a voyage from a Dutch port to Samarang, Netherlands East Indies. The wreck was discovered on 16 November by the steamship Sirius (United Kingdom) and was scuttled.

== 2 August ==
List of shipwrecks: 2 August 1880
Ship	State	Description
Edmund Kaye	United Kingdom	The ship was driven ashore 8 nautical miles (15 km) south of Cape Henry, on Anticosti Island, Nova Scotia, Canada and was severely damaged. She was on a voyage from Garrucha, Spain to Quebec City, Canada. She was later refloated.
Halewood	United Kingdom	The barque was driven ashore and wrecked at "Praia Taipit South", Brazil. Her crew were rescued. She was on a voyage from London to Santos, Brazil.
Laine	Russia	The barque ran aground in the River Avon underneath the Clifton Suspension Bridge and subsequently capsized. She was on a voyage from Pensacola, Florida, United States to Bristol, Gloucestershire, United Kingdom.

== 3 August ==
List of shipwrecks: 3 August 1880
Ship	State	Description
Adele Accame	United Kingdom	The ship ran aground at Portishead, Somerset. She was on a voyage from New York, United States to Bristol, Gloucestershire.
Giovanni Boscovich	Austria-Hungary	The derelict barque was sighted in a sinking condition in the Mediterranean Sea (39°52′N 11°58′E) by the steamship Prins Hendrik (Netherlands).
Northern Ensign	United Kingdom	The fishing boat sank off Rose Hearty, Aberdeenshire with the loss of all six crew. The loss was caused by the weight of her catch.
Regnator	Norway	The ship departed from Greenock, Renfrewshire, United Kingdom for Demerara, British Guiana. No further trace, reported missing.

== 4 August ==
List of shipwrecks: 4 August 1880
Ship	State	Description
Alpha	United Kingdom	The ship was driven ashore at Aarhus, Denmark. She was on a voyage from a Scottish port to Aarhus. She was refloated.
Florist	United Kingdom	The ship ran aground off Kingsdown, Kent. She was on a voyage from South Shields, County Durham to Port-en-Bessain, Calvados, France. She was refloated and taken in to The Downs.
Lassa	United Kingdom	The barque was wrecked at the Santapille Lighthouse, India. Her crew were rescued.
Melbourne Trader	United Kingdom	The ship foundered off the Corsewall Lighthouse, Wigtownshire. Her three crew survived. She was on a voyage from Girvan, Ayrshire to Newry, County Antrim.

== 5 August ==
List of shipwrecks: 5 August 1880
Ship	State	Description
Albert Edward, and Alexandra	United Kingdom	The steamships collided at Portsmouth, Hampshire and were both severely damaged. Albert Edward was on a voyage from Stokes Bay to Ryde, Isle of Wight. Alexandra was on a voyage from Ryde to Portsmouth. Both vessels were towed in to Southampton, Hampshire.
Alert	United Kingdom	The schooner sprang a leak and sank 8 nautical miles (15 km) west south west of the Eddystone Lighthouse. Her crew were rescued. She was on a voyage from Plymouth, Devon to Aberystwyth, Cardiganshire.
Augusta	Flag unknown	The ship departed from Santa Anna for a British port. No further trace, reported severely overdue.
Cervantes	United Kingdom	The ship ran aground in the Humber. She was on a voyage from Quebec City, Canada to Hull, Yorkshire.
Delaide	Italy	The barque was wrecked at Cabo Polonio, Uruguay. She was on a voyage from Cádiz, Spain to the river Plate.
Gustave Henrie	France	The sloop ran aground on the Barnard Sand, in the North Sea off the coast of Norfolk, United Kingdom. She was on a voyage from Boulogne, Pas-de-Calais to Great Yarmouth, Norfolk. She was refloated and assisted in to Great Yarmouth.

== 6 August ==
List of shipwrecks: 6 August 1880
Ship	State	Description
Aramis	France	The brigantine was driven ashore at the Castillo de Guardias Viejas, Spain. She was on a voyage from Cardiff, Glamorgan, United Kingdom to Agrigento, Italy.
Ethelwin	United Kingdom	The steamship struck a sunken rock in the Douro and was beached. She was on a voyage from Blyth, Northumberland to Porto, Portugal.
Kilvey	United Kingdom	The brig was abandoned in the Atlantic Ocean. Her crew were rescued by the steamship Loanda (United Kingdom). Kilvey was on a voyage from Troon, Ayrshire to Demerara, British Guiana.
Leon	Spain	The steamship ran aground at Dunkirk, Nord, France. She was on a voyage from Bilbao to Dunkirk. She was refloated.
Maria and Ellen	United Kingdom	The schooner sprang a leak and sank in the North Sea 20 nautical miles (37 km) off Thurso, Caithness. Her crew were rescued by the ketch Jane Hunter (United Kingdom). Maria and Ellen was on a voyage from Caernarfon to Sunderland, County Durham.
Robert Brown	United Kingdom	The steamship ran aground in the Scheldt at Bath, Zeeland, Netherlands. She was on a voyage from Antwerp, Belgium to South Shields, County Durham. She was refloated and resumed her voyage.
St. Athens	United Kingdom	The schooner ran aground at Östergarn, Sweden. She was on a voyage from Saint Petersburg, Russia to Helsingør, Denmark. She was later refloated.

== 7 August ==
List of shipwrecks: 7 August 1880
Ship	State	Description
Alexandra	Flag unknown	The brig collided with the steamship Skane (Flag unknown) and was reported to have sunk in the Baltic Sea off Gotland, Sweden. Her crew were rescued by Skane. Alexandra was on a voyage from Cádiz, Spain to Porvoo, Grand Duchy of Finland. Alexandra was towed in to Burgsvik, Gotland in a capsized condition on 10 August.
Bessie Young	United Kingdom	The ship ran aground at Collier Hope, Yorkshire. She was on a voyage from Quebec City, Canada to Whitby, Yorkshire. She was refloated and taken in to Whitby, Yorkshire.
Climax	United Kingdom	The schooner sprang a leak and was beached between Ryde and Seaview, Isle of Wight. She was on a voyage from Castle Hill to Weymouth, Dorset. She was refloated and taken in to Bembridge, Isle of Wight.
Dunoon Castle	United Kingdom	The paddle steamer struck a submerged rock and was beached in the Clyde at Gourock, Renfrewshire. All 700 passengers and crew were landed. She was later refloated and taken in to Bowling, Dunbartonshire for repairs.
George	United Kingdom	The trow was driven ashore between Burnham-on-Sea and Highbridge, Somerset. Her crew were rescued.
Harriet	United Kingdom	The smack was wrecked on Pentire Point East, Newquay, Cornwall. There was controversy over the launching of the lifeboat and the crew were eventually saved by the Newquay Lifeboat Pendock Neale ( Royal National Lifeboat Institution). Harriet was on a voyage from Swansea, Glamorgan to Hayle, Cornwall.
Industry	United Kingdom	The trow was driven ashore between Burnham-on-Sea and Highbridge. Her crew were rescued.
Jeddah	United Kingdom	The passenger ship suffered progressive boiler damage and lost her sails in heavy weather in the Indian Ocean beginning on 3 August. Some of her officers abandoned her on 7 August, assuming she would sink, leaving her adrift of Cape Guardafui, Majeerteen Sultanate with about 1,000 passengers and crew aboard. The crew who had abandoned her were rescued on 8 August by the convict ship Scindian (United Kingdom). The steamship Antenor (France) towed Jeddah into port at Aden, Aden Governorate on 11 August. Eighteen lives were lost in the incident.
Lady Beatrix	United Kingdom	The steamship collided with the full-rigged ship Rhine (United States) and sank in the River Thames at Greenwich, Kent. She was refloated on 12 August and taken in to Limehouse, Middlesex.
Loch Etive	United Kingdom	The steamship was driven ashore at the Worms Head, Glamorgan. She was subsequently refloated and towed in to Swansea.
Marie	France	The schooner was driven ashore and wrecked in Mother Joey's Bay, near Padstow, Cornwall. Her crew were rescued by rocket apparatus. She was on a voyage from Porthcawl, Glamorgan to Bordeaux, Gironde.
Oliver	United Kingdom	The ship foundered in Western Bay. All on board Survived.
Prince of Bridgewater	United Kingdom	The schooner was driven ashore at Burnham-on-Sea, Somerset. Her seven crew were rescued by the Burnham Lifeboat.
Prune	United Kingdom	The schooner was driven ashore and sank at Burnham-on-Sea. Her crew were rescued by the Burnham Lifeboat Cheltenham ( Royal National Lifeboat Institution). Prune was later refloated and towed in to Bridgwater for repairs.
San Salvador	United States	The ship departed from Truxillo for Nuevitas, Cuba. No further trace, reported missing.
Tidy	United Kingdom	The brigantine was driven ashore and wrecked in Broughton Bay, Glamorgan. Her crew survived. She was on a voyage from Portland, Dorset to Llanelly, Glamorgan.
Victoria	Norway	The barque was driven ashore at Blokhus, Denmark. She was on a voyage from Rochefort, Charente-Inférieure, France to Härnösand, Sweden. She was refloated on 9 August and taken in to Fredrikshavn, Denmark.
Waveney	United Kingdom	The cutter yacht was driven ashore at Fort Blockhouse, Hampshire.
Unnamed	Germany	The brig was driven ashore at the mouth of the River Avon.
Unnamed	United Kingdom	The ship was driven ashore at Weston-super-Mare, Somerset.

== 8 August ==
List of shipwrecks: 8 August 1880
Ship	State	Description
Ada	United Kingdom	The yacht sank at Ryde, Isle of Wight.
Auguste	Sweden	The ship departed from Santa Anna for a British port. No further trace, reported missing.
Erasmus Corning	United States	The steamship struck a rock and sank off Glen Island. More than 600 people were rescued by the steamship St. Nicholas (United States).
Fiery Cross	United Kingdom	The steamship ran aground at Aberdour, Fife. She was on a voyage from Leith, Lothian to Aberdour. She was refloated the next day.
Hugh Taylor	United Kingdom	The steamship caught fire at sea whilst on a voyage from Arzew, Algeria to Leith, Lothian. The fire was extinguished.
Moonbeam	United Kingdom	The cutter yacht was driven into Ryde Pier, Isle of Wight and sank.
Spray	United Kingdom	The schooner foundered off Berville-sur-Mer, Eure, France. Her crew were rescued. She was on a voyage from Fowey, Cornwall to Rouen, Seine-Inférieure, France.

== 9 August ==
List of shipwrecks: 9 August 1880
Ship	State	Description
Alba	Spain	The steamship departed from Havana, Cuba for "Alvares", Mexico. No further trace, presumed foundered with the loss of all hands.
Antoinetta C.	Flag unknown	The ship was destroyed by fire at New York, United States.
Bonnie Lee	United States	The steamship struck an obstruction causing her boiler to explode, sinking her. Nine crew were killed.
City of Alpena	United States	City of Alpena in 2015. The wooden tug caught fire and sank in 9 feet (2.7 m) of water in Lake Huron near Black River, Michigan at 44.7878°N 83.2944°W.
Cyclone	United States	The ship was destroyed by fire at New York.
Heir Apparent	United Kingdom	The schooner sprang a leak and was abandoned in the English Channel 10 nautical miles (19 km) south east of Start Point, Devon. She was on a voyage from Blyth, Northumberland to Brest, Finistère, France.
John Read	United States	The full-rigged ship was driven ashore on Öland, Sweden. She was refloated.
Nicteaux	Canada	The ship was destroyed by fire at New York.
Sarah And Mary	New Zealand	The ketch was wrecked after running aground on an island in Queen Charlotte Sound after her line parted. The ship's stove was knocked over by the force of the impact, and the ship caught fire. Her crew successfully landed on the island.
Unnamed	United Kingdom	The steam barge collided with the steamship Fair Head at Barrow-in-Furness, Lancashire and was beached.
Unnamed	Flag unknown	The steamship was driven ashore on Terschelling, Friesland, Netherlands. She was refloated and resumed her voyage.

== 10 August ==
List of shipwrecks: 10 August 1880
Ship	State	Description
Bull Lightship, and Orient	Trinity House; United Kingdom	The Bull Lightship was run into by the smack Orient and was severely damaged. Orient was also damaged; she put back to Grimsby, Lincolnshire.
Calypso	United Kingdom	The steamship ran aground at Wexford. She was on a voyage from Wexford to Bristol, Gloucestershire.
Luna	Cape Colony	The schooner foundered. Her crew were rescued. She was on a voyage from Hondeklip Bay to Cape Town.
Margaret and Jane	United Kingdom	The schooner collided with the steamship Llewellyn (United Kingdom) and sank 20 nautical miles (37 km) off St. Bees Head, Cumberland. Her crew were rescued. She was on a voyage from Whitehaven, Cumberland to Ardglass, County Down.
Tidy	United Kingdom	The schooner was wrecked in Brighton Bay.
Unnamed	United States	The schooner was destroyed by fire in Newtown Creek.

== 11 August ==
List of shipwrecks: 11 August 1880
Ship	State	Description
Candate	Netherlands	The schooner was wrecked at the mouth of the Rio Grande. All on board were rescued.
Pelaw	United Kingdom	The steamship struck a rock off the Isles of Scilly. She was on a voyage from Cardiff, Glamorgan to Gibraltar. She put in to Falmouth, Cornwall in a leaky condition.

== 12 August ==
List of shipwrecks: 12 August 1880
Ship	State	Description
Ada	United States	The schooner was lost in a hurricane at or near Los Brazos de Santiago, Texas.
Albertina	Netherlands	The schooner was driven ashore and sank at "Gammelsby", Öland, Sweden. She was on a voyage from Riga, Russia to Rotterdam, South Holland.
Bravo	United States	The sloop was lost in a hurricane at or near Los Brazos de Santiago.
Braissed	United States	The schooner was lost in a hurricane at or near Los Brazos de Santiago.
Douglas	United Kingdom	The steamship ran aground at Kalix, Sweden. She was refloated in September and taken in to Gothenburg, Sweden.
Eothen	United Kingdom	The steam yacht ran aground in the River Foyle. She was refloated on 17 August with the assistance of two tugs.
Gannet	United Kingdom	The steamship was driven ashore at Calcutta, India. She was on a voyage from Calcutta to London. She was refloated and put back to Calcutta.
J. L. Sellers	United States	The steamship sank in a hurricane at Los Brazos de Santiago. Three crewmen were killed.
John Scott	United States	The steamship broke from her moorings in a hurricane at Los Brazos de Santiago. She filled and sank.
Laura Lewis	United States	The schooner was lost in a hurricane at or near Los Brazos de Santiago.
Leo	United States	The steamship broke from her moorings in a hurricane at Los Brazos de Santiago. She filled and sank.
Lilly Weeks	United States	The schooner was lost in a hurricane at or near Los Brazos de Santiago.
Petula	United States	The sloop was lost in a hurricane at or near Los Brazos de Santiago.
Rebecca	United States	The schooner was lost in a hurricane at or near Los Brazos de Santiago.
Seven Brothers	United Kingdom	The schooner sprang a leak and sank 12 nautical miles (22 km) south of the Calf of Man, Isle of Man. Her crew survived. She was on a voyage from Port Dinorwic, Caernarfonshire to Coleraine, County Antrim.
Weaver	United States	The sloop was lost in a hurricane at or near Los Brazos de Santiago.
Several unnamed vessels	United States	Several steamboats were lost during a great storm on 12 and 13 August at Brownsville, Texas.

== 13 August ==
List of shipwrecks: 13 August 1880
Ship	State	Description
Ellen and Lucy	United Kingdom	The brigantine was run into by the steamship Teviot (United Kingdom) and sank in the North Sea 6 nautical miles (11 km) off the Outer Dowsing Sandbank. Her crew were rescued by Teviot. Ellen and Lucy was on a voyage from the River Tyne to Ipswich, Suffolk.
Fjerde November	Norway	The ship ran aground on the Finngrund and was subsequently destroyed by fire.
Horse Guards	United Kingdom	The steamship was damaged by an onboard explosion at Penarth, Glamorgan.
Kosmopolit	Germany	The brigantine foundered at sea with the loss of a crew member. She was on a voyage from Algoa Bay to Lagos.
Prospero	United Kingdom	The steamship struck the quayside at Grimsby, Lincolnshire and sank at the bow. She was on a voyage from Danzig, Germany to Grimsby.
Unnamed	Netherlands	The ship was run down and sunk in the IJ by the steamship Plover (United Kingdom).

== 14 August ==
List of shipwrecks: 14 August 1880
Ship	State	Description
Auguste	United Kingdom	The schooner ran aground on the Brambles, in the Solent. She was on a voyage from Portland, Dorset to London She was refloated and resumed her voyage.
Bertha	Norway	The brig was driven ashore on Saltholm, Denmark. She was on a voyage from Sundsvall, Sweden to Dordrecht, South Holland, Netherlands.
Ethel	United Kingdom	The steamship ran aground on the Banjaard Sand, in the North Sea off the coast of Zeeland, Netherlands. She was on a voyage from Kronstadt, Russia to Antwerp, Belgium. She was refloated and resumed her voyage.
Excel	United Kingdom	The fishing smack was driven ashore 1 nautical mile (1.9 km) north of Withernsea, East Riding of Yorkshire.
Golden Fleece	United Kingdom	The ship ran aground in the Hooghly River at "Budge Budge". She was on a voyage from Liverpool, Lancashire to Calcutta, India. She was refloated with assistance.
Lippe	Belgium	The steamship struck rocks off Abrevac'h, Finistère, France. She was on a voyage from Antwerp to Bordeaux, Gironde, France. She put in to Brest, Finistère in a leaky condition.
Rhoda Mary	United Kingdom	The schooner ran aground on the Goodwin Sands, Kent. She was on a voyage from Antwerp to Tunis, Beylik of Tunis. She was refloated and taken in to The Downs in a leaky condition. She was taken in to Dover for repairs the next day.
Sylvanus	United Kingdom	The ship was abandoned off St Gowan's Head, Pembrokeshire. Her crew were rescued by Prince of Wales (United Kingdom). Sylvanus was on a voyage from Cardiff, Glamorgan to Waterford.

== 15 August ==
List of shipwrecks: 15 August 1880
Ship	State	Description
Avola Pellegrina	Italy	The brig was wrecked at "Castellos", Uruguay. She was on a voyage from Valencia, Spain to Montevideo, Uruguay.
Ben Lomond	United Kingdom	The steamship ran ashore on Brigantine Beach Island, New York, United States. She was on a voyage from the Delaware Breakwater to New York City. She was refloated and resumed her voyage.
Lady Havelock	United Kingdom	The steamship was holed. She put in to Sanlúcar de Barrameda, Spain where she was beached.

== 16 August ==
List of shipwrecks: 16 August 1880
Ship	State	Description
Titian	United Kingdom	The steamship was driven ashore at Port Said, Egypt. She was on a voyage from Cardiff, Glamorgan to Bussorah, Persia. She was refloated and taken in to Suez, Egypt in a leaky condition.

== 17 August ==
List of shipwrecks: 17 August 1880
Ship	State	Description
Alice	Netherlands	The brig was driven ashore and wrecked at Saint Domingo.
Castle Roy	United Kingdom	The ship ran aground at Anjer, Netherlands East Indies. She was on a voyage from Singapore, Straits Settlements to London.
Dione	Sweden	The steamship ran aground on the Djurslens-Grundet. She was on a voyage from "Halsta" to Gävle. She was later refloated and taken in to Stockholm.
Ellen Mary	United Kingdom	The yacht ran aground in Bray Bay. She was driven ashore and wrecked the next day. All on board were rescued.
Longford	United Kingdom	The steamship collided with the steamship Baltic (United Kingdom) in the River Mersey. She was on a voyage from Dublin to Liverpool. She was taken in to Liverpool, where she sank.
Rainbow	United States	The barque was driven ashore on the coast of French Indo-China. She was on a voyage from New York to Saigon, French Indo-China.
Sophia	United Kingdom	The Thames barge capsized and sank in the River Medway off Queenborough, Kent with the loss of a crew member. Her captaing was rescued by boats from Fly and Princess (both United Kingdom).

== 18 August ==
List of shipwrecks: 18 August 1880
Ship	State	Description
Akbar	United Kingdom	The barque was driven ashore and severely damaged in at hurricane at Kingston, Jamaica.
American	United Kingdom	The steamship was driven ashore in a hurricane at Kingston. Her crew were rescued.
Amicitia	Norway	The ship was run into by the steamship Westminster (United Kingdom) and sank in the River Thames at Cuckold's Point.
Caroni	Canada	The brigantine was wrecked in a hurricane at Kingston, Jamaica. Her crew survived. She was on a voyage from Lockeport, Nova Scotia, Canada to Kingston.
C. C. B.	Jamaica	The schooner was wrecked in a hurricane at Kingston.
Chiabera	Italy	The ship departed from Paysandú, Uruguay for Falmouth, Cornwall. No further trace, reported missing.
Dauntless	Jamaica	The schooner sank in a hurricane at Kingston.
Everhard Delius	Germany	The barque was severely damaged in a hurricane at Kingston. Her crew were rescued. She was on a voyage from New York, United States to Kingston. She was declared to be irreparable.
Jane Patterson	Jamaica	The schooner was driven ashore in a hurricane at Kingston.
Manuelita	Jamaica	The schooner was driven ashore in a hurricane at Kingston.
Midsummer	United Kingdom	The barque was driven ashore and severely damaged at Morant Bay, Jamaica. She was refloated in September.
Moselle	Jamaica	The schooner was driven ashore in a hurricane at Kingston.
Nightingale	Jamaica	The schooner sank in a hurricane at Kingston.
Nuncio	Canada	The ship ran aground at Waterford, United Kingdom. She was on a voyage from Philadelphia, Pennsylvania, United States to Waterford.
Sisters	Jamaica	The schooner sank in a hurricane at Kingston.
Spray	Jamaica	The schooner was driven ashore in a hurricane at Kingston.
Star	Jamaica	The schooner was wrecked in a hurricane at Kingston.
Tamar	Jamaica	The schooner sank in a hurricane at Kingston.
Trent	Jamaica	The schooner sank in a hurricane at Kingston.
Twilight	Jamaica	The schooner was wrecked in a hurricane at Kingston.
Victorine	Jamaica	The schooner was wrecked in a hurricane at Kingston.
Waterwitch	Jamaica	The schooner sank in a hurricane at Kingston.
Wave	Jamaica	The schooner was driven ashore in a hurricane at Kingston.

== 19 August ==
List of shipwrecks: 19 August 1880
Ship	State	Description
Brantford City	Canada	The ship ran aground at West Hartlepool, County Durham, United Kingdom. She was on a voyage from Boston, Massachusetts, United States to West Hartlepool.
Brothers	United Kingdom	The fishing smack collided with a schooner and sank off the Swin Middle Lightship ( Trinity House) with the loss of one of her four crew. Survivors were rescued by the smack Volunteer (United Kingdom).
Camille	France	The barque was driven ashore at Banana, Africa.
Elizabeth Ann	United Kingdom	The ship sprang a leak and was beached at Milford Haven, Pembrokeshire. She was on a voyage from "Dudda" to Cardiff, Glamorgan.
Gartconnel	United Kingdom	The full-rigged ship collided with the barque Christel (Germany) and sank in the Atlantic Ocean. Some of her crew were rescued by Christel. Gartconnel was on a voyage from Passaroeang, Netherlands East Indies to Queenstown, County Cork.
Elizabeth Ann	United Kingdom	The ship sprang a leak and was beached at Milford Haven, Pembrokeshire. She was on a voyage from "Dudda" to Cardiff, Glamorgan.
Paris	United Kingdom	The steamship ran agroudn at "Taieleff Point". She was refloated and resumed her voyage.

== 20 August ==
List of shipwrecks: 20 August 1880
Ship	State	Description
Amadeo	United States	The ship foundered off Rockport, Texas with the loss of all hands.
Christiana	United States	The schooner was driven ashore at Rockport.
Felton Bent	United States	The ship was towed in to Greenport, New York on fire. She was on a voyage from New York City to Rio de Janeiro, Brazil. She was a total loss.
Griffin	United Kingdom	The steam yacht struck the pier at Dover, Kent and was holed at the bow. She was beached.
Kingston	United Kingdom	The ship ran aground at Riga, Russia. She was on a voyage from Riga to Newport, Monmouthshire.
Laurel	United States	The schooner was driven ashore and wrecked at Rockport with the loss of all but two of those on board.
Lillie Weeks	United Kingdom	The schooner was driven ashore and wrecked at Rockport with the loss of all hands.
Marina Benvenuto	Italy	The barque caught fire at Montevideo, Uruguay. She was on a voyage from the Clyde to Montevideo and Buenos Aires, Argentina.
Star of Africa	United Kingdom	The ship struck the Albatross Rock and sank 6 nautical miles (11 km) south of Cape Point, Cape Colony with the loss of twelve of her fourteen crew. She was on a voyage from Calcutta, India to Cape Town, Cape Colony.
Welcome	United States	The schooner was driven ashore on Mustang Island, Texas with the loss of all but one of her crew.
Unnamed	Flag unknown	The barque was wrecked on the Swin Middle Sand, in the Thames Estuary.

== 21 August ==
List of shipwrecks: 21 August 1880
Ship	State	Description
Algitha	United Kingdom	The steamship ran aground at Gibraltar. She was on a voyage from Akyab, Burma to Liverpool, Lancashire. She was refloated and resumed her voyage.
Sunshine	United Kingdom	The steamship was severely damaged by an onboard explosion. She was on a voyage from Sunderland, County Durham to Saint Petersburg, Russia. She put in to Copenhagen, Denmark.
Petrel	United Kingdom	The yacht was run down by a Mersey Ferry and sank. Three of the four people on board were rescued.
Waveney Queen	United Kingdom	The yacht ran aground in the River Orwell. She was then run into by the steamship Esther (United Kingdom).

== 22 August ==
List of shipwrecks: 22 August 1880
Ship	State	Description
Estella	France	The steamship ran aground at Fleetwood, Lancashire, United Kingdom. She was on a voyage from Oran, Algeria to Fleetwood. She was refloated.
Fair Head	United Kingdom	The steamship struck a rock off the Isle of Skye, Outer Hebrides. She was on a voyage from Barrow-in-Furness, Lancashire to Kronstadt, Russia. She put back to Barrow-in-Furness.

== 23 August ==
List of shipwrecks: 23 August 1880
Ship	State	Description
Adelaide	United Kingdom	The steamship ran aground at Maassluis, South Holland, Netherlands. She was on a voyage from Rotterdam, South Holland to Harwich, Essex. She was refloated with assistance.
Ingeborg	United Kingdom	The schooner caught fire in the North Sea and was abandoned. She was on a voyage from "Fakenborg" to Bo'ness, Lothian.
Reviewer	United Kingdom	The barque was driven ashore and wrecked at Sheet Harbour, Nova Scotia, Canada. Her crew were rescued. She was on a voyage from Liverpool to Philadelphia, Pennsylvania, United States.
Rivadivia	France	The steamship was wrecked at A Coruña, Spain. She was on a voyage from Havre de Grâce, Seine-Inférieure to a port in Brazil.

== 24 August ==
List of shipwrecks: 24 August 1880
Ship	State	Description
Ethel Caine	Jamaica	The steamship was driven ashore at John's Point. She was on a voyage from Montego Bay to the Milk River. She was refloated.
James A. Harley	United Kingdom	The brig struck a rock off Madeira. She put in to Madeira in a leaky condition.
James Groves	United Kingdom	The steamship was driven ashore at Soderhamn, Sweden. She was refloated.
Ulysses	(United Kingdom of Great Britain and Ireland) Guernsey	The ship was driven ashore at Weymouth, Dorset.

== 25 August ==
List of shipwrecks: 25 August 1880
Ship	State	Description
Larish	United Kingdom	The steamship ran aground on Elbow Key, Florida, United States. She was refloated and taken in to Galveston, Texas, United States.

== 26 August ==
List of shipwrecks: 26 August 1880
Ship	State	Description
Eastern Star	United Kingdom	The ship was driven ashore at Durban, Colony of Natal and was probably wrecked.
Hetty Taylor	United States	Sonar image of the wreck of Hetty Taylor, June 9, 2022. During a voyage in ballast from Milwaukee, Wisconsin, to Escanaba, Michigan, the 84.1-foot (25.6 m), 84.84-gross register ton schooner encountered a squall and capsized and sank in Lake Michigan about 5 nautical miles (9.3 km; 5.8 mi) off Sheboygan, Wisconsin. Her crew of five rowed safely to shore in a small boat. Hetty Taylor came to rest at 43°40.893′N 087°39.291′W in 105 to 110 feet (32 to 34 m) of water with 8 feet (2.4 m) of her main topmast protruding above the surface. Salvage efforts apparently were abandoned after late April 1881. In 2005, the shipwreck site was added to the National Register of Historic Places, and in 2021 it was included in the Wisconsin Shipwreck Coast National Marine Sanctuary.
Southern Queen	New Zealand	The schooner was driven onto a reef and wrecked at Amuri Bluff. Two lives were lost.
Surprise	United Kingdom	The shipw was driven ashore at Durban and was probably wrecked.
Two unnamed vessels	Switzerland	The ships were driven ashore and wrecked in Lake Lucerne. Their crews were rescued.

== 27 August ==
List of shipwrecks: 27 August 1880
Ship	State	Description
Albatross	United Kingdom	The lugger was driven ashore at Cromer, Norfolk.
Express	United Kingdom	The barge was run into by the steamship Orleans (United Kingdom) and sank off the North Foreland, Kent. Her crew were rescued by Orleans.
John Wesley	Norway	The barque ran aground at "Pullen", Denmark. She was refloated.
Nannie Noall	United Kingdom	The fishing vessel was run into by the steamship Aurora (United Kingdom) and sank about 4 or 5 nautical miles (7.4 or 9.3 km) south west of the Wolf Rock. Two of her seven crew were drowned. Survivors were rescued by Aurora.
Queen	United Kingdom	The lugger struck a sunken wreck and foundered in the North Sea off Great Yarmouth, Norfolk. Her crew were rescued.
Stonewall Jackson	United States	The ship caught fire at Surabaya, Netherlands East Indies.

== 28 August ==
List of shipwrecks: 28 August 1880
Ship	State	Description
Cycrops	Denmark	The schooner ran aground at Tyne Dock, Northumberland, United Kingdom and sank. Her crew were rescued.
Rinaldo	Italy	The barque was wrecked on Saint Lucia. She was on a voyage from Rio de Janeiro, Brazil to Pensacola, Florida, United States.
Seraphin	France	The brig sprang a leak and foundered off Santoña, Spain. She was on a voyage from Bilbao, Spain to Dunkirk, Nord.
Theodor H. Rand	United States	The ship ran aground on the Hittarp Reef, in the Baltic Sea. She was on a voyage from New York to Copenhagen, Denmark. She was refloated with assistance.

== 29 August ==
List of shipwrecks: 29 August 1880
Ship	State	Description
City of Vera Cruz	United States	The steamship sank off the coast of Florida in a hurricane with the loss of 57 of the 82 people on board. She was on a voyage from New York to Mexico
H. Houston	United States	The ship sprang a leak and foundered. Her crew were rescued. She was on a voyage from Cuba to New York.
Marine City	United States	While carrying passengers and a cargo of fish and shingles, the wooden paddle steamer burned and sank in 5 feet (1.5 m) of water in Lake Huron 2 nautical miles (3.7 km) off Alcona, Michigan, at 44.770617°N 83.289433°W. Six passengers and three crew were killed.
Mary	United Kingdom	The ship ran aground at the entrance to the Larne Lough. She was on a voyage from Garston, Lancashire to Larne, County Antrim. She was refloated and found to be leaky.
Star of Africa	Cape Colony	The ship was wrecked on a reef off Simon's Town with the loss of all but two of those on board.

== 30 August ==
List of shipwrecks: 30 August 1880
Ship	State	Description
Chanticleer	United Kingdom	The steamship was driven ashore on Terschelling, Friesland, Netherlands. She was refloated.
Felisa	Spain	The ship was abandoned in the Atlantic Ocean off Cape Canaveral, Florida, United States. She was on a voyage from New Orleans, Louisiana, United States to Barcelona. She was towed in to Saint Augustine, Florida by a steamship on 30 September.
Formose	France	The ship was lost off the coast of Africa. She was on a voyage from Bathurst, Gambia Colony and Protectorate to Dunkirk, Nord.
Haworth	United Kingdom	The steamship collided with an iceberg in the Strait of Belle Isle and was severely damaged. A crew member fell overboard and was drowned. She was on a voyage from Barrow-in-Furness, Lancashire to Montreal, Quebec, Canada. Temporary repairs were made at sea and she completed her voyage.
Leon	Spain	The steamship ran aground on Perim, Aden Governorate. She was on a voyage from Liverpool, Lancashire, United Kingdom to Singapore, Straits Settlements. She was refloated on 4 September.
Norman	United Kingdom	The steamship ran aground at Hoek van Holland, South Holland, Netherlands. She was on a voyage from Bilbao, Spain to Rotterdam, South Holland. She was refloated.
Royal Standard	United Kingdom	The steamship ran aground at Stefano Point, Ottoman Empire. She was on a voyage from Newcastle upon Tyne, Northumberland to Constantinople, Ottoman Empire.
Superior	United States	The ship collided with Illyrian (United Kingdom) and sank. She was on a voyage from Bilbao, Spain to New York.
Typhis	(United Kingdom of Great Britain and Ireland) Jersey	The schooner departed from Labrador, Newfoundland Colony for Jersey. No further trace, reported missing.

== 31 August ==
List of shipwrecks: 31 August 1879
Ship	State	Description
Carroll	United States	The steamship was driven ashore at "Murphy's Point", Prince Edward Island, Canada. She was on a voyage from Boston, Massachusetts to Charlottetown, Prince Edward Island.
David Law	United Kingdom	The full-rigged ship was destroyed by fire west of Speedwell Island, Falkland Islands. Her crew were rescued. She was on her maiden voyage, from Leith, Lothian to San Francisco, United States.

== Unknown date ==
List of shipwrecks: Unknown date in August 1879
Ship	State	Description
Adara and Northumbria	Flag unknown United Kingdom	The steamships collided at Alexandria, Egypt and were both severely damaged. Northumbria was beached.
Adino	Norway	The brigantine was wrecked on the Alacranes Reef. Her crew were rescued. She was on a voyage from Campeche, Mexico to Falmouth, Cornwall, United Kingdom.
Africa	France	The brigantine was wrecked on Eagle Island.
Ala	Norway	The ship was driven ashore on the north point of Öland, Sweden. She was on a voyage from Härnösand, Sweden to Montrose, Forfarshire, United Kingdom.
Allegro	United States	The ship was driven ashore and wrecked at Cape Henlopen, Delaware. She was on a voyage from Martinique to the Delaware Breakwater.
Anna Lazzarevich	Flag unknown	The ship caught fire and sank 15 nautical miles (28 km) off "Cape St. Angel". Her crew were rescued. She was on a voyage from Marseille, Bouches-du-Rhône, France to Constantinople, Ottoman Empire.
Arabian	United Kingdom	The schooner ran aground on the Haisborough Sands, in the North Sea off the coast of Norfolk. She was on a voyage from Kristiansand, Norway to Chester, Cheshire. She was refloated and taken in to Great Yarmouth, Norfolk.
Asia	United Kingdom	The steamship caught fire at Bône, Algeria and was scuttled. She was a total loss.
Astra	United States	The ship was driven ashore at Cape Henlopen, Delaware. She was on a voyage from Guadeloupe to Philadelphia, Pennsylvania. She was refloated and taken in to Philadelphia.
Bachi	United Kingdom	The ship was abandoned at sea. Her crew were rescued. She was on a voyage from Havana, Cuba to Gibraltar.
Balmuir	United Kingdom	The steamship was driven ashore on Cape Sable Island, Nova Scotia, Canada. She was refloated and completed her voyage to Boston, Massachusetts, United States in a leaky condition.
Banner	United Kingdom	The full-rigged ship was wrecked on the Pedro Bank, off Jamaica. Her 24 crew took to three boats; they subsequently reached Savannah, Georgia, United States.
Bona Fide	United Kingdom	The ship ran aground at Signilskär, Åland, Grand Duchy of Finland before 27 August. She was on a voyage from London to Umeå, Sweden. She was refloated and put in to Stockholm, Sweden.
Cartsburn	United Kingdom	The ship was destroyed by fire in the Mozambique Channel. She was on a voyage from Dundee, Forfarshire to Bombay, India.
Countess of Cromarty	United Kingdom	The ship sank off Cape Sweetnose, Russia. Her crew were rescued.
Cybele	United Kingdom	The steamship was driven ashore at the east end of Anticosti Island, Nova Scotia. She was on a voyage from Glasgow to Montreal. She subsequently became a wreck.
Dora	Germany	The barque was destroyed by fire in the Atlantic Ocean. Her crew were rescued. She was on a voyage from Leith, Lothian, United Kingdom to Rio de Janeiro, Brazil.
Egbert	United Kingdom	The steamship ran aground in Chesapeake Bay. She was on a voyage from Baltimore, Maryland, United States to Newcastle upon Tyne, Northumberland. She was refloated and resumed her voyage.
Enfant de France	France	The barque was wrecked at Vieques, Porto Rico. Her crew were rescued.
Faro	Norway	The barque was abandoned in the Atlantic Ocean before 25 August. She was on a voyage from Darien, Georgia, United States to Limerick, United Kingdom.
Flavian	United Kingdom	The steamship was driven ashore in the Bay of Bulls before 15 August. She was on her maiden voyage, from Liverpool, Lancashire to Baltimore, Maryland. She had been refloated by 11 September and towed in to Saint John's, Newfoundland Colony.
George Roscovich	Austria-Hungary	The barque was abandoned in the Mediterranean Sea off the coast of Sardinia, Italy. She was towed in to Palermo, Sicily, Italy on 5 August by Invincible (Royal Navy).
Hazel Holme	United Kingdom	The ship ran aground at Camden Point, County Cork. She was refloated and taken in to Queenstown.
Initium	United Kingdom	The ship ran aground in Lac Saint-Pierre.
Isidora	Netherlands	The brig was driven ashore and wrecked at Hjørring, Denmark. Her crew were rescued. She was on a voyage from Riga, Russia to Delfzijl, Groningen.
Johanne	Denmark	The brig was beached at the mouth of the Goatzacoalcos River and was wrecked. She was on a voyage from Minatitlán, Mexico to Falmouth.
K	United Kingdom	The steam barge struck the jetty at Cowes, Isle of Wight and sank.
Kilwa	United Kingdom	The steamship ran aground off Amherst, Burma. She was refloated and taken in to Moulmein.
L'Avvenire	France	The ship was driven ashore at Bilbao, Spain. She was on a voyage from Bilbao to New York, United States. She was refloated and completed her voyage in a leaky condition.
Marie Louise	France	The ship caught fire and sank off the coast of Nord on or before 19 August.
Martha P. Tucker	United States	The barque ran aground at "Bancochico", Uruguay. She was refloated with the assistqnce of a steamship and resumed her voyage.
Mary Anning	United Kingdom	The barque struck a rock and foundered. Her crew survived. She was on a voyage from Belize City, British Guiana to Liverpool.
Mary Coverdale	United Kingdom	The ship ran aground at "Svenska Bjorn" before 27 August. She was on a voyage from Oulu, Grand Duchy of Finland to Hartlepool, County Durham. She was refloated and taken in to Stockholm.
Messagero	Italy	The brig foundered at sea before 17 August. Her crew were rescued. She was on a voyage from Genoa to Montevideo, Uruguay.
Nadine	Imperial Russian Navy	The torpedo boat was wrecked near the mouth of the Jaguaribe River. Her crew survived.
Neptune	France	The sloop sank at Bordeaux, Gironde.
Pinta	United Kingdom	The brigantine ran aground on the Cockle Sand. She was refloated and taken in to Whitstable, Kent.
Ragnhild	Norway	The barque ran aground at Honfleur, Manche, France and was severely damaged.
Ridesdale	United Kingdom	The ship ran aground at Santos, Brazil. She was on a voyage from London to Santos. She was reflaoted and taken in to Santos.
Salisbury	United Kingdom	The steamship was driven ashore at "Hastobuso", near Ekenäs, Grand Duchy of Finland.
Sarah	United Kingdom	The schooner ran aground on the Shoebury Sand, in the Thames Estuary. She was on a voyage from London to Swansea, Glamorgan. She was refloated on 8 August.
Sir John Newport	United Kingdom	The schooner struck a sunken rock and sprang a leak. She was on a voyage from Stockholm, Sweden to London. She put in to Kalix, Sweden for repairs.
Sisters	United Kingdom	The smack was driven ashore and wrecked at Isleornsay, Isle of Skye, Outer Hebrides. Her crew survived. She was on a voyage from Ardrossan, Ayrshire to Portree, Isle of Skye.
Stranton	United Kingdom	The steamship was damaged by fire at Baltimore, Maryland.
Tiphys	United Kingdom	The brig departed from New York for Jersey, Channel Islands. No further trace, presumed foundered with the loss of all on board.
Vigie	France	The ship was driven ashore on Texel, North Holland, or Terschelling, Friesland, Netherlands with the loss of her captain. She was on a voyage from Le Tréport, Seine-Inférieure to Christiania, Norway.
Waldensian	United Kingdom	The steamship ran aground at Pointe-aux-Trembles, Quebec, Canada and was beached. She was on a voyage from Montreal, Quebec to Glasgow, Renfrewshire.
William G. Davis	United States	The ship ran aground on the Bulkhead Shoal, in the Schuylkill River. She was on a voyage from Philadelphia to Dublin, United Kingdom.
Witch of the Teign	United Kingdom	The schooner foundered at sea. Her crew survived. She was on a voyage from "Porman" to Workington, Cumberland.
Unnamed	Germany	The ship was wrecked on the east coast of Madagascar before 14 August.
