= Pablo de la Torriente Brau =

Cuban writer and soldier (1901–1936)

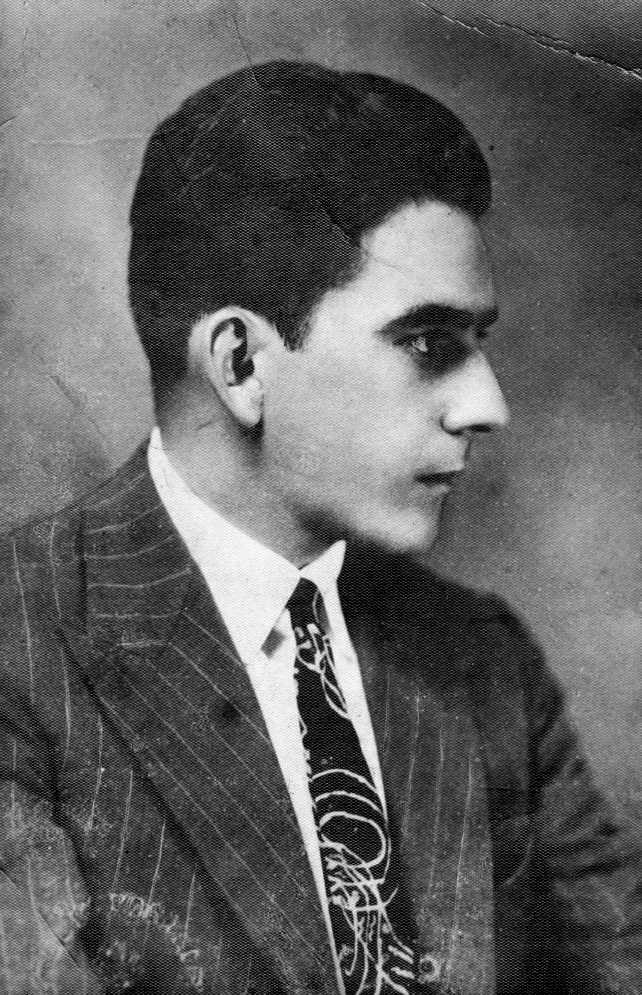
de la Torriente Brau c. 1936

Pablo de la Torriente Brau (San Juan de Puerto Rico, December 12, 1901 – Majadahonda, near Madrid, Spain, December 19, 1936) was a Cuban writer, journalist and soldier.

He was a correspondent in Spain, writing for the Mexican newspaper El Machete. He fought for the Republic and against Francisco Franco's forces in the Spanish Civil War, and died in combat, while fighting in Majadahonda city during the defense of Madrid.

He was married to the Cuban writer, actress and activist Teresa Casuso Morín.

Aventuras de un soldado desconocido cubano ("Adventures of an Unknown Cuban Soldier") was published after his death (1940).
