= Nuevitas Municipal Museum =

Museum in Cuba

- Museo Municipal de Nuevitas
- Established: 18 August 1981
- Location: Nuevitas, Cuba
- Coordinates: 21.5440°N 77.2638°W

Nuevitas Municipal Museum is a museum located in Nuevitas, Cuba. It was established on 18 August 1981.

The museum holds collections on history, weaponry, decorative arts and archeology.

== See also ==
- List of museums in Cuba
