= Teresa Casuso Morín =

Cuban writer and actor (1912–1994)

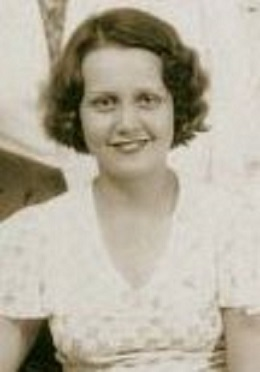
- Teresa "Teté" Casuso Morin

Lorenza Teresa Inocencia Casuso y Morín (better known as "Teté" Casuso; Madruga, Cuba 10 August 1912 – Miami, USA 28 July 1994) was a prominent Cuban intellectual, who fought for democracy and freedom in Cuba. As a writer, she worked in various genres, including novel, theater, chronicle, poetry, as well as radio and cinematographic librettos. Her journalistic work appeared in several publications in Cuba, Mexico and the US. She also worked as a translator and drama teacher; and was an actress of stage and screen. Along with several other middle-class, educated women writer contemporaries - Emilia Bernal, Lydia Cabrera, Ana Maria Simo, Hilda Perera Soto, and Rita Geada - Casuso left Cuba after the 1959 Revolution.

== Biography ==
Lorenza Teresa Inocencia Casuso y Morín was born in Madruga, 10 August 1912.

During her stay in Mexico in the 1940s, she appeared in a number of films as a supporting actress, including El tigre de Jalisco in 1947.

She participated actively in the student struggles against the dictatorship of Gerardo Machado and during Castro's exile in Mexico, helped in the preparation of the Granma expedition. She raised money for both arms and the Granma yacht that would take the revolutionaries back to Cuba. After the triumph of the revolution in 1959, she became Ambassador of Cuba in Mexico. Upon her return to Cuba, she was appointed by the Commander-in-chief Fidel Castro as his Press Secretary and at the end of that year, Ambassador Extraordinary and Plenipotentiary Alternate Representative to the United Nations, a position she held until her resignation and defection in October 1960. She spent hours waiting for Castro so that she could express her concerns at his increasing dictatorial style but they never met. Despite her defection, Fidel Castro held her in high regard. In December 1967 he wrote that, "Although you are not included among the 12 comrades and brothers of our struggle, you will always, Teté, be remembered as if you had been".

Casuso was married to Cuban writer Pablo de la Torriente Brau, who was killed fighting for the Republican side in the Spanish Civil War.

== Selected works ==
- 1934: Versos míos de la libreta tuya
- 1938: Panorama de México
- 1944: Los Ausentes. México
- 1951: Recuerdos de un viaje a Europa
- 1961: Castro and Cuba
- 1963: Cuba Y Castro

=== Unpublished ===
- 1955: Utopía
- 1955: Aprendiz de ángel
- 1956: Bienvenida la vida
