= Emilia Bernal =

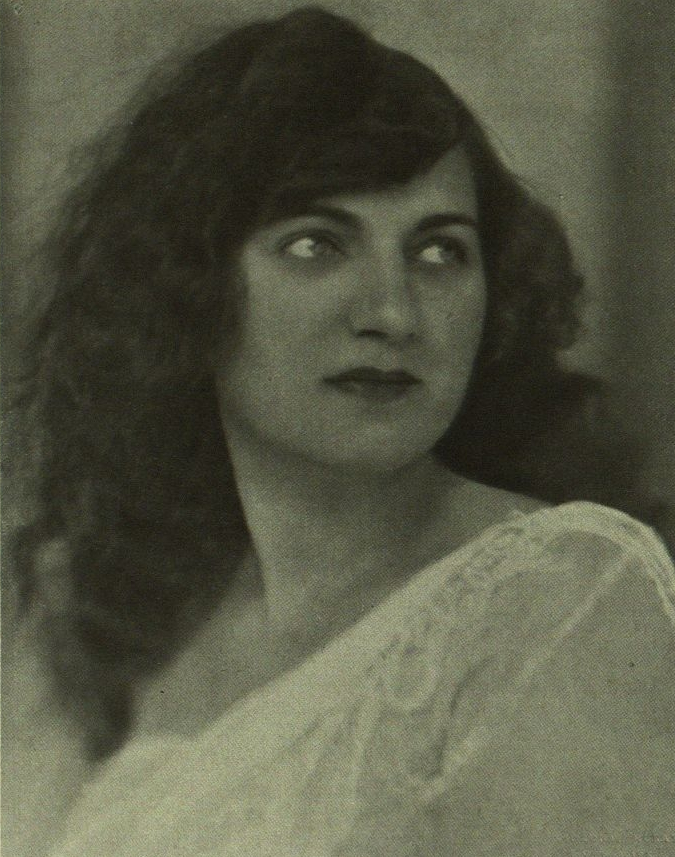
Emilia Bernal

Emilia Bernal Agüero (Nuevitas, 8 May 1882 – 1964) was a Cuban poet, who also cultivated other genres such as essay, translation and the autobiographical novel. Along with several other middle-class, educated women writer contemporaries -Lydia Cabrera, Teresa Casuso Morín, Rita Geada, Ana Maria Simo, and Hilda Perera Soto- Bernal left Cuba after the 1959 Revolution.

== Biography ==
Emilia Bernal Aguero was born and raised in Nuevitas, Camagüey Province), where her mother was a teacher. Following the Cuban War of Independence of 1895, the family emigrated briefly to Hispaniola, but soon returned to Cuba, settling in Havana. There, she began to make herself known by writing for various newspapers. She spent most of her life abroad, traveling throughout America and Europe. In Spain, she spent time at the Residencia de Estudiantes and traveled to Granada where she met Manuel de Falla. She had a relationship with the Majorcan Llorenç Villalonga i Pons; though there were differences of age and training, they inspired each other. The Foundation that bears her name annually awards the Emilia Bernal Literary Prize.

== Selected works ==
- Alma errante (1916)
- ¡Cómo los pájaros! (1922)
- Poesías inéditas (1922)
- Layka Froyka; el romance de cuando yo era niña (1925, 1931)
- Vida (1925)
- Cuestiones cubanas (1928)
- Exaltación (1928)
- Martí por sí mismo (1934)
- Negro (1934)
- América (1937)
- Ensayo sobre el problema de la raza negra en Cuba (1937)
- Sentido (1937)
- Sonetos (1937)
- Mallorca (1938)
