= Enrique Cirules =

- Born: 1938; Nuevitas, Camagüey Province, Cuba
- Died: 18 December 2016 (aged 77–78)
- Citizenship: Cuban
- Occupations: Writer, essayist
- Writing career
- Language: Spanish
- Genres: Non-fiction, novel, short story, essay
- Notable work: Mafia in Havana (1993)
- Notable awards: Casa de las Américas Prize (1993, 1999); Literary Critic's Award (1994)

Enrique Cirules (1938 – 18 December 2016) was a Cuban writer and essayist. He was born in Nuevitas, Camagüey Province.

== Biography ==
Among his best known works are Conversation with the last American (1973), a non-fiction novel about the establishing, rise and fall of an American city in Cuba, The Other War (short stories, 1980), The Saga of La Gloria City (novel, 1983) and Bluefields (novel, 1986). His most famous work is Mafia in Havana (El Imperio de La Habana) which won the Casa de Las Américas Prize for literature in 1993 and the Literary Critic's Award in 1994. Ernest Hemingway in the Romano Archipelago won a mention at the Casa de Las Américas in 1999. His most recent works are The Secret life of Meyer Lansky in Havana (2004 and 2006) and Santa Clara Santa (2006).

Cirules died on 18 December 2016 at the age of 78.
