= Nuevitas =

Nuevitas Nuevitas "La Bella"
- Municipality
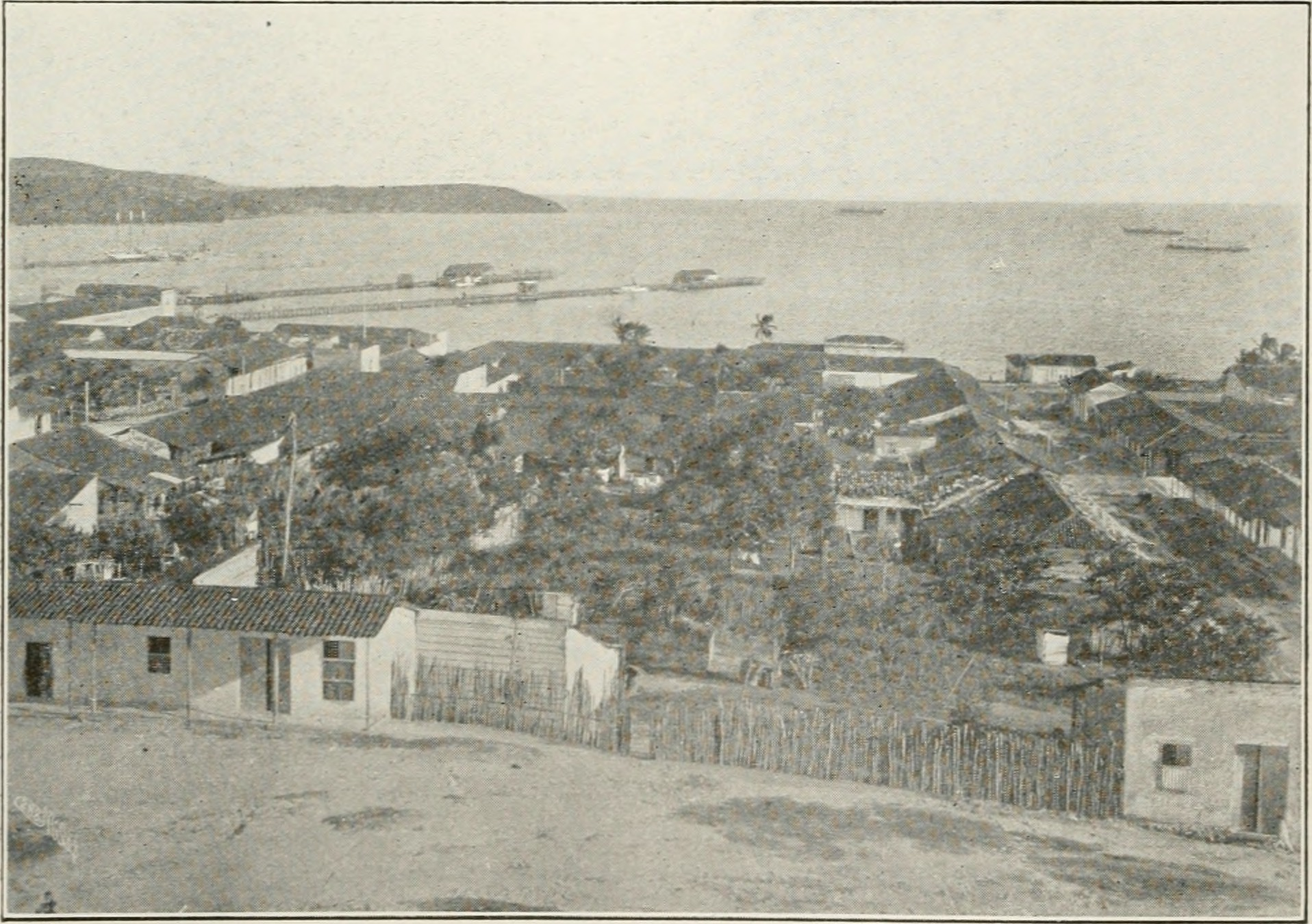
- A photograph of the town overlooking Nuevitas Bay, taken in the early 1900s.

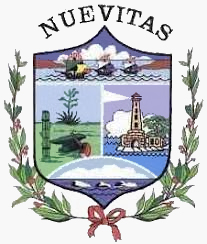
- Coat of arms

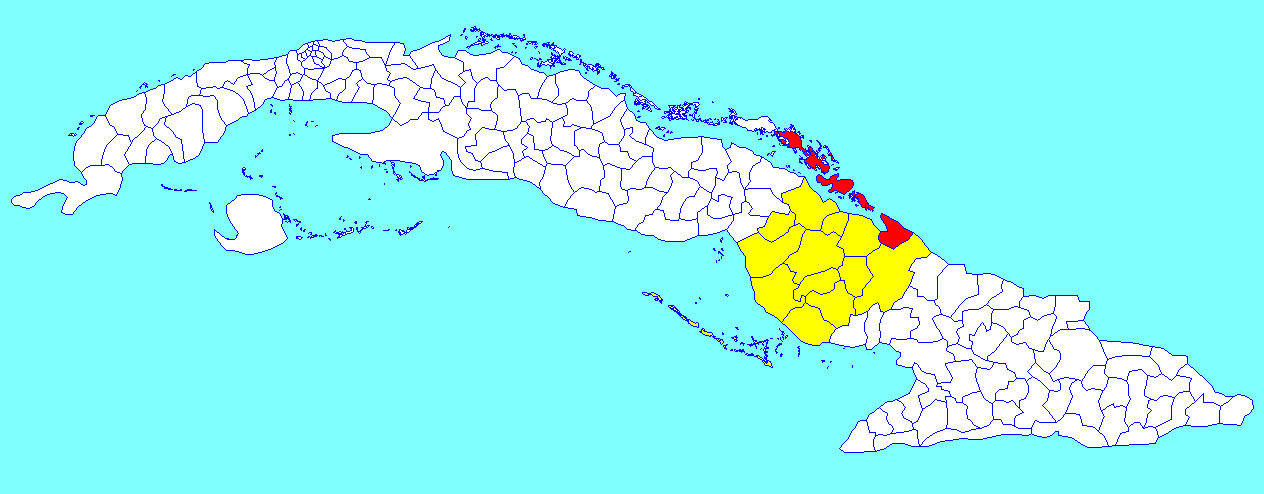
- Nuevitas municipality (red) within Camagüey Province (yellow) and Cuba
- Coordinates: 21°32′25″N 77°15′52″W
- Country: Cuba
- Province: Camagüey
- Established: 1818

Area
  - Total: 415 km^{2} (160 sq mi)
- Elevation: 20 m (66 ft)

Population (2022)
  - Total: 59,483
  - Density: 143/km^{2} (371/sq mi)
- Time zone: UTC-5 (EST)
- Area code: +53-322

Nuevitas is a municipality and port town in the Camagüey Province of Cuba. The large bay was sighted by Christopher Columbus and crew during their first voyage of exploration in 1492.

== History ==
Founded in 1775 during the time of the Spanish Empire, the city was moved to its present site in 1828. Before the 1977 national municipal reform, Nuevitas was divided into the barrios of Primero, Segundo, Tercero, Alvaro Reinoso, Lugareño, Redención, San Miguel and Senado.

== Geography ==
Nuevitas is located on the Guincho peninsula on the north coast, and borders with the municipalities of Guáimaro, Minas, Manatí (in Las Tunas Province) and Morón (in Ciego de Ávila Province). The municipality includes the villages of Camalote, Pastelillo, Playa Santa Lucía, San Agustín, San Miguel de Bagá and Santa Rita.

Nuevitas is not a very large city but it is one of Cuba's most important towns because of its commercial and industrial activities. Nuevitas is located southwest of Playa Santa Lucía, which is popular with tourists. Cayo Sabinal is located immediately north; other cays are Cayo Guajaba and Cayo Romano. The only waterway that separates Santa Lucia from Ensenada Playa Bonita is the canal of Nuevitas which connects the Bahia de Nuevitas to the Atlantic Ocean.

== Demographics ==
In 2022, the municipality of Nuevitas had a population of 59,483. With a total area of 415 km^{2} (160 sq mi), it has a population density of 140/km^{2} (360/sq mi).

== Transport ==
Nuevitas is sheltered by a huge harbor, has two auxiliary ports, and is a major shipping point for Cuban sugar as well as other products from the surrounding agricultural region. It also possesses diversified light industry and serves as a road and rail terminus. The principal road crossing the municipality is the state highway "Circuito Norte" (CN).

The railway station is the terminus of two lines: one from Camagüey, and a second from Santa Clara, through the Atlantic Coast and Morón.

== Personalities ==
- Emilia Bernal (1882–1964), poet
- Enrique Cirules (1938–2016), writer
- Armando Coroneaux (b. 1985), footballer
- Amparo de Zeledón (1870–1951), botanist and philanthropist

== Sister cities ==
- Benalmádena, Spain

== See also ==
- Nuevitas–Camagüey Road
- Nuevitas Municipal Museum
- List of cities in Cuba
- Municipalities of Cuba
