= 1880 Atlantic hurricane season =

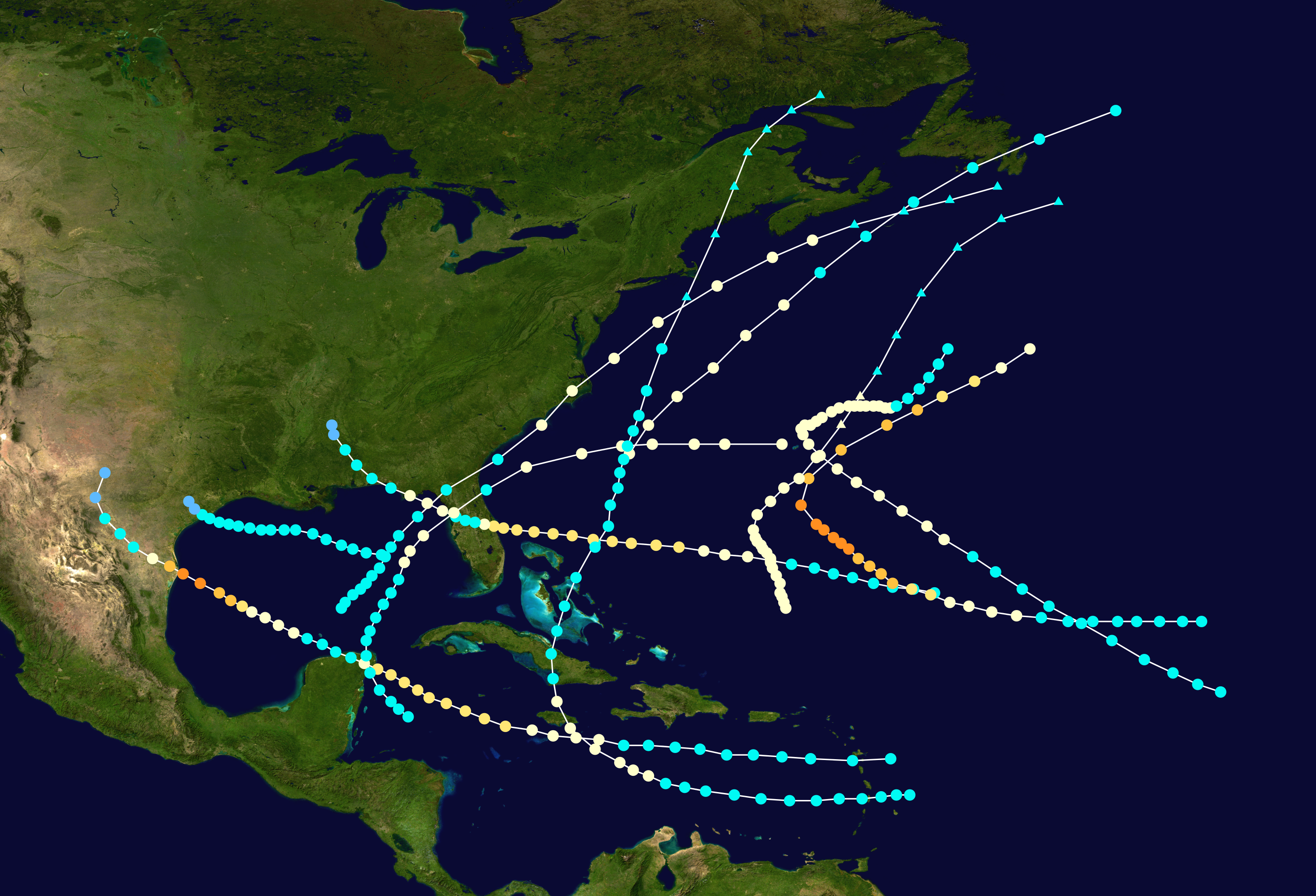
- Season summary map

Seasonal boundaries
- First system formed: June 21, 1880
- Last system dissipated: October 23, 1880

Strongest storm
- By maximum sustained winds: Two
  - Maximum winds: 150 mph (240 km/h) (1-minute sustained)
  - Lowest pressure: 931 mbar (hPa; 27.49 inHg)
- By central pressure: Eight
  - Maximum winds: 140 mph (220 km/h) (1-minute sustained)
  - Lowest pressure: 928 mbar (hPa; 27.4 inHg)

Seasonal statistics
- Total storms: 11
- Hurricanes: 9
- Major hurricanes (Cat. 3+): 2
- Total fatalities: >129
- Total damage: > $1.098 million (1880 USD)

The 1880 Atlantic hurricane season included four hurricanes striking or producing hurricane-force winds in the United States, tied with 1852 and 1869 for the most in one season before 1886. In the 1880 season, there were two tropical storms, seven hurricanes, and two major hurricanes. (Note: A major hurricane is a storm that ranks as Category 3 or higher on the Saffir–Simpson hurricane wind scale.) However, in the absence of modern satellite and other remote-sensing technologies, only storms that affected populated land areas or encountered ships at sea were recorded, so the actual total could be higher. An undercount bias of zero to six tropical cyclones per year between 1851 and 1885 and zero to four per year between 1886 and 1910 has been estimated.

The track of the season's first cyclone begins over the east-central Gulf of Mexico on June 21. Striking Texas on June 24, the storm dissipated by the following day after causing little impact. No additional activity occurred until August. That month, the season's second and third cyclones each caused about 30 deaths, with the former causing about $1 million (1880 USD) in damage in northern Tamaulipas and southern Texas and the latter inflicting $50,000 in damage at Up-Park Camp in Jamaica alone. (Note: All values in 1880 USD unless otherwise noted.) Near the end of August, 68 people drowned after the fourth system wrecked the City of Vera Cruz steamship as the hurricane approached landfall in Florida. Another late August storm, the season's fifth cyclone, caused approximately $48,000 in damage on Bermuda and drowned one person after being swept overboard a ship near the island. Several other storms impacted land or mariners, but to a lesser extent. Overall, the storms of the 1880 season collectively caused more than $1.098 million in damage and over 129 fatalities.

Of the known 1880 cyclones, the sixth was first documented in 1995 by José Fernández-Partagás and Henry F. Diaz. They also proposed large changes to the known tracks of several other storms for this year and re-instated the tenth system in the hurricane database (HURDAT). In the early 21st century, the Atlantic hurricane reanalysis project did not add or remove any cyclones and only made significant modifications to the fourth storm, shortening its duration by one day. A preliminary reanalysis by Michael Chenoweth, published in 2014, found 13 storms, 9 hurricanes, and 4 major hurricanes. Chenoweth also proposed some alterations to the track and intensity of each storm, but these changes have yet to be incorporated into HURDAT.

== Seasonal summary ==
The Atlantic hurricane database (HURDAT) recognizes 11 tropical cyclones for the 1880 season. In the 1880, there were two known tropical storms, seven hurricanes, and two major hurricanes in the Atlantic basin. Four of these hurricanes either made landfall in the United States or produced hurricane-force winds in the country, tied with 1852 and 1869 for the most in one season prior to 1886. Meteorologists José Fernández-Partagás and Henry F. Diaz first documented the season's sixth system in 1995 and added the tenth storm back into HURDAT, after it had been excluded from the 1993 reanalysis led by meteorologist C. J. Neumann, despite being discussed in the November 1880 edition of the Monthly Weather Review. They also modified the tracks of all cyclones except the first and the eleventh. The Atlantic hurricane reanalysis project in the early 21st century did not add or remove any cyclones and only made significant modifications to the fourth storm, shortening its duration by one day after determining that the system decayed faster over the Southern United States than previous reassessments of the season showed. A reanalysis by climate researcher Michael Chenoweth, published in 2014, adds four storms and removes two, the first and eleventh systems. Chenoweth's study utilizes a more extensive collection of newspapers and ship logs, as well as late 19th century weather maps for the first time, in comparison to previous reanalysis projects. However, Chenoweth's proposals have yet to be incorporated into HURDAT.

The first cyclone of the season was first detected over the east-central Gulf of Mexico on June 21. Striking Texas on June 24, the storm dissipated by the following day after causing little impact. No additional known activity occurred until August 4, the day that the season's second storm began producing winds, rains, and decreasing atmospheric pressures over the Lesser Antilles. Later, the cyclone struck the Yucatán Peninsula as a Category 2 hurricane on the present-day Saffir–Simpson scale and then northern Tamaulipas as a Category 4 hurricane with winds of 150 mph (240 km/h), the highest sustained wind speed in the Atlantic basin in 1880. In addition to causing about $1 million in damage in Tamaulipas and Texas, at least 30 deaths occurred, primarily at sea. The season's third cyclone made landfall on Jamaica as a Category 1 hurricane, causing 30 fatalities and $50,000 in damage at Up-Park Camp alone. Near the end of August, 68 people drowned after the fourth system wrecked the City of Vera Cruz steamship as the hurricane approached landfall in Florida. Another late August storm, the season's fifth cyclone, caused approximately $48,000 in damage on Bermuda and drowned one person after being swept overboard a ship near the island. Three systems developed in September, all of which intensified into hurricanes. The last of the three, the season's eighth storm, peaked as a Category 4 hurricane with maximum sustained winds of 140 mph (220 km/h) and a minimum atmospheric pressure of 928 mbar (27.4 inHg), the lowest recorded in the basin in 1880. October also featured three storms, including the eleventh and final of the season, which transitioned into an extratropical cyclone while approaching coastal Massachusetts on October 23. Overall, the storms of the 1880 season collectively caused more than $1.098 million in damage and over 129 fatalities.

The season generated an accumulated cyclone energy (ACE) of 131 units, above the 1981–2010 median of 92, as well as the second-highest total prior to 1886, behind only 1878. ACE is a metric used to express the energy used by a tropical cyclone during its lifetime. Therefore, a storm with a longer duration will have higher values of ACE. It is only calculated at six-hour increments in which specific tropical and subtropical systems are either at or above sustained wind speeds of 39 mph (63 km/h), which is the threshold for tropical storm intensity. Thus, tropical depressions are not included here.

== Systems ==
=== Tropical Storm One ===
- Tropical storm (SSHWS)
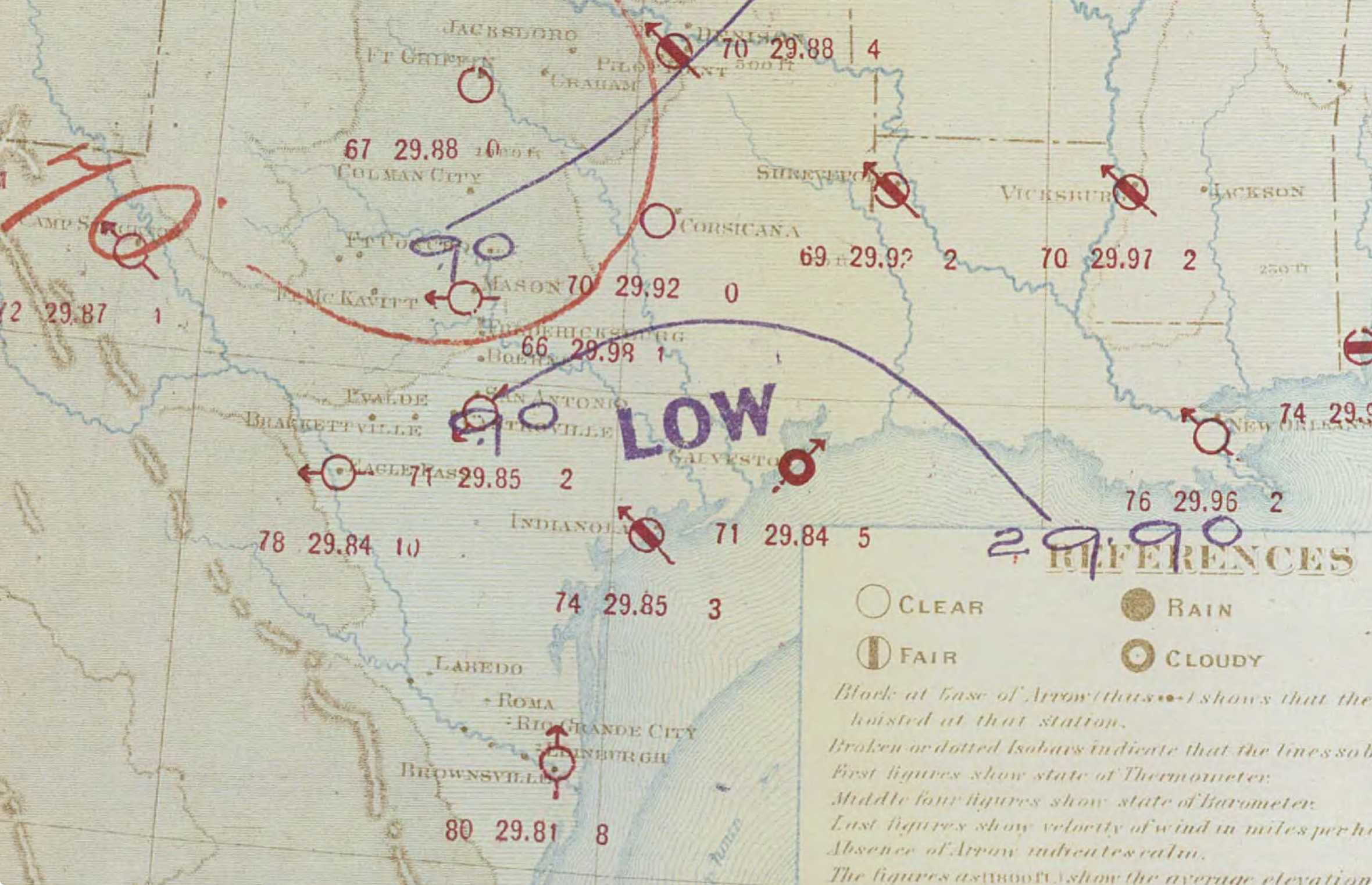
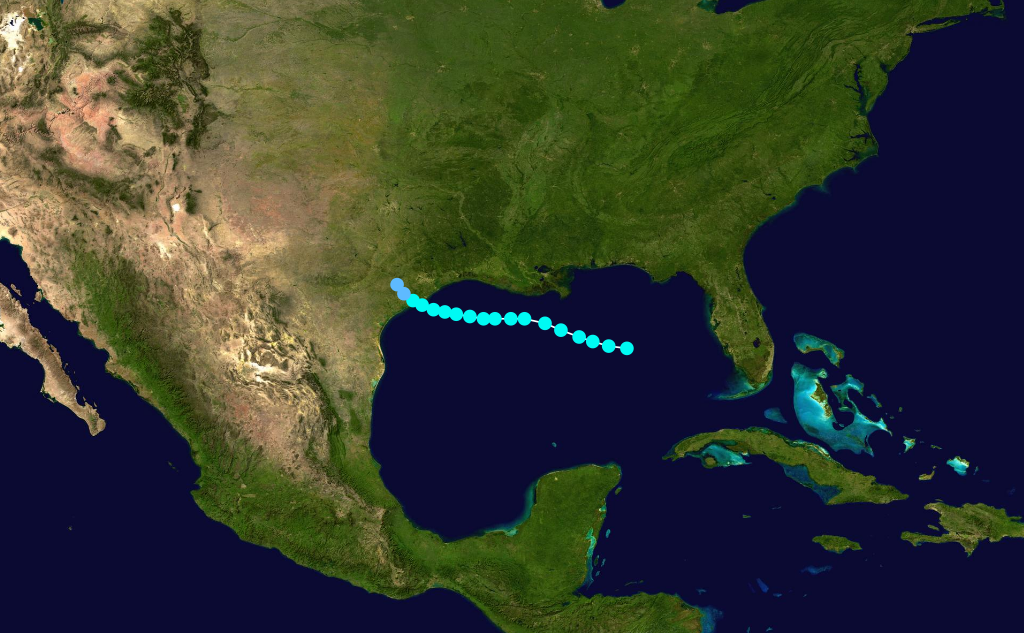
- Duration: June 21 – June 25
- Peak intensity: 45 mph (75 km/h) (1-min);

The first tropical storm of the season formed early on June 21, about 215 mi (345 km) south-southwest of Cape San Blas, Florida. On the same date, the schooner James Andrew registered a small area of severe winds and squalls. Over the next few days, the system moved generally westward to west-northwestward, maintaining winds of 45 mph (75 km/h). At 15:00 UTC on June 25, the slow-moving cyclone made landfall southwest of present-day Bay City, Texas. The system then weakened rapidly as it headed inland, dissipating 18 hours later. A weather station in Galveston recorded 2.56 in (65 mm) of rain in an eight-hour period. A preliminary reanalysis by climate researcher Michael Chenoweth in 2014 concluded that the system did not qualify as an organized tropical system.

=== Hurricane Two ===
- Category 4 hurricane (SSHWS)
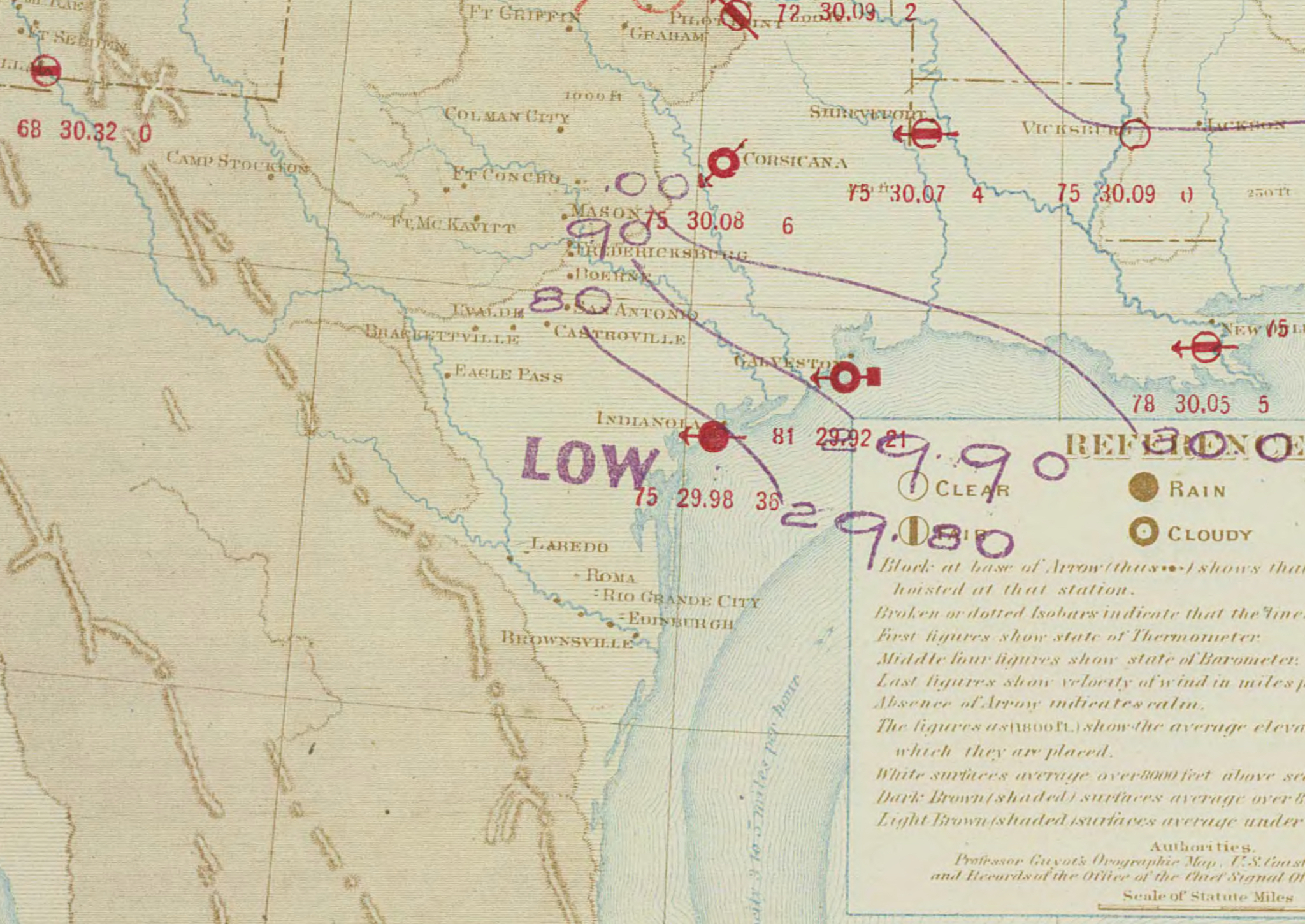
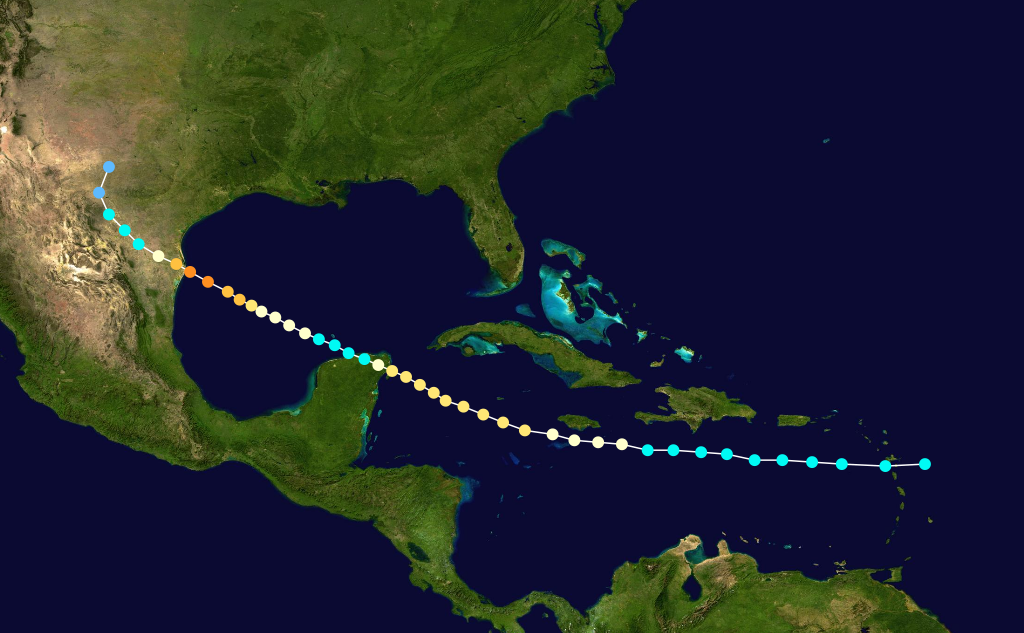
- Duration: August 4 – August 14
- Peak intensity: 150 mph (240 km/h) (1-min); 931 mbar (hPa)

The second tropical cyclone of the season originated about 95 mi (155 km) east of Guadeloupe at 00:00 UTC on August 4. The cyclone tracked westward through the southernmost Leeward Islands, generating southeast winds, rain, and sea-level pressures of 1,008 mbar (29.78 inHg). Gradually strengthening, it reached hurricane intensity on August 6, and passed 35 mi (55 km) south of Jamaica. The storm attained winds of 105 mph (165 km/h) at 12:00 UTC on August 7—an intensity it maintained over the next few days while turning west-northwestward. On August 9, the hurricane struck the Yucatán Peninsula near Puerto Morelos, and weakened significantly as it headed inland. Reaching the southern Gulf of Mexico as a tropical storm on August 10, the cyclone then underwent steady intensification: 48 hours later, it became a major hurricane, and peaked at 150 mph (240 km/h) early on August 13. At 01:00 UTC, the strong Category 4 hurricane struck northern Tamaulipas, 15 mi (25 km) south of Port Isabel, Texas, with a minimum pressure determined to be 931 mbar (27.5 inHg) at the time, based on a reading of 959 mbar (28.3 inHg) coincident with hurricane-force winds at Brownsville. The cyclone then passed over Matamoros and Brownsville and weakened as it paralleled the Rio Grande, curved into South Texas, and dissipated on August 14. Chenoweth mainly proposed a slightly more southerly track for this storm, while also delaying the system's intensification into a hurricane until August 9.

In Jamaica, Kingston reported unsettled weather and falling barometers. Hurricane-force winds occurred offshore of western Cuba. The storm caused several ships to be lost or stranded in or near the Yucatán Channel. In the Mexican state of Yucatán, winds and heavy rains in the Mérida area uprooted trees and destroyed huts, while boats were lost. Hitting close to the Mexico–United States border, the powerful cyclone severely impacted both nations. The pressure in the storm was In Tamaulipas, the hurricane destroyed many homes at Matamoros, causing about 200,000 pesos in damage and leaving about 1,000 families homeless, while similar impacts occurred in Allende de Bravo and Bagdad. Extensive crop losses were also reported in this region of Tamaulipas. The cyclone destroyed 300 homes in Matamoros and downed buildings and fences in Brownsville. At the latter place, debris covered streets. Strong winds destroyed 20 structures at Fort Brown, the barracks sustained damage, and 35 horses and mules died. Ten vessels sank in the Rio Grande and at Port Isabel, resulting in three deaths. The storm levelled buildings, killed domestic pigs, and generated a storm surge of 8 ft (2.4 m) on Padre Island. The storm also ruined 10 mi (16 km) of track bed in Texas. Seven deaths took place on land: two in Matamoros, "at least" five in Brownsville. The Monthly Weather Review noted that damage estimates at Brownsville, Texas, and Matamoros, Tamaulipas, as well as areas in the vicinity reached approximately $1 million. Total fatalities in the storm numbered 30 or more, primarily at sea.

=== Hurricane Three ===
- Category 1 hurricane (SSHWS)
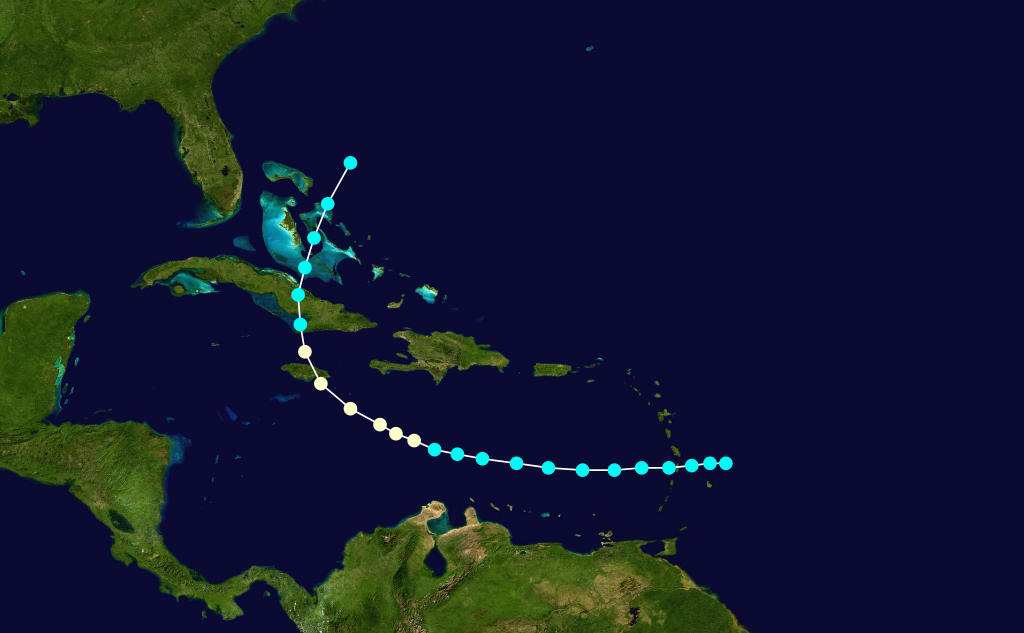
- Duration: August 15 – August 20
- Peak intensity: 90 mph (150 km/h) (1-min); 980 mbar (hPa)

The third tropical cyclone of the season developed 75 mi (120 km) northeast of Barbados early on August 15. Pursuing a parabolic path, it headed west-southwest across Saint Lucia, and a ship noted heavy squalls near Guadeloupe. On August 16, the fast-moving tropical storm, then nearing hurricane intensity, turned westward over the eastern Caribbean Sea. At 00:00 UTC on August 18, upon reaching hurricane status, it commenced a northwestward course toward Jamaica. On the same date, the ship Nith registered a pressure of 987 mbar (29.15 inHg) in the storm. At 00:00 UTC on August 19, the cyclone peaked with winds of 90 mph (150 km/h), and shortly afterward struck Kingston, Jamaica. While traversing eastern Jamaica, the cyclone weakened, and turned northward to strike Pilón, Cuba, with winds of 80 mph (130 km/h). The storm lost hurricane intensity after landfall, turned to the north-northeast, and swiftly crossed the Bahamas on August 20. The storm was last identifiable at 18:00 UTC, over the southwestern Atlantic Ocean, with winds of 45 mph (75 km/h).

According to Chenoweth's 2014 reanalysis study, the cyclone instead clipped the north coast of Martinique and intensified significantly after crossing Jamaica, briefly reaching major hurricane status on August 19. Later, the system made landfall in North Carolina on August 23 as a tropical storm and dissipated the next day. The eye of the storm passed directly over Kingston, Jamaica, with a measured central pressure of 980 mbar (28.93 inHg). In Jamaica, the storm inflicted "immense" destruction. At Yallahs, the storm wrecked 59 houses. In Saint George Parish, 116 homes were levelled. Hundreds of homes were destroyed at Richmond. The local hospital, chapels, and a church were destroyed at Morant Bay. In Saint John Parish, the storm destroyed 40 houses. The military barracks at Up-Park Camp were destroyed, with losses totalling $50,000. Banana crops were destroyed in a 12-mile (19 km) area near Port Maria. Of the 45 vessels at anchor in Kingston, only two were undamaged. Most of the wharves in Kingston were destroyed. The hurricane was responsible for 30 deaths in Jamaica. The hurricane brought squally conditions to eastern Cuba. Manzanillo recorded a minimum barometric pressure of 992 mbar (29.30 inHg). A preliminary reanalysis in 2014 classified the storm as a Category 3 hurricane in Jamaica, based on an unconfirmed ship report of 962 mbar (28.40 inHg) by the S. S. Tropic.

=== Hurricane Four ===
- Category 2 hurricane (SSHWS)
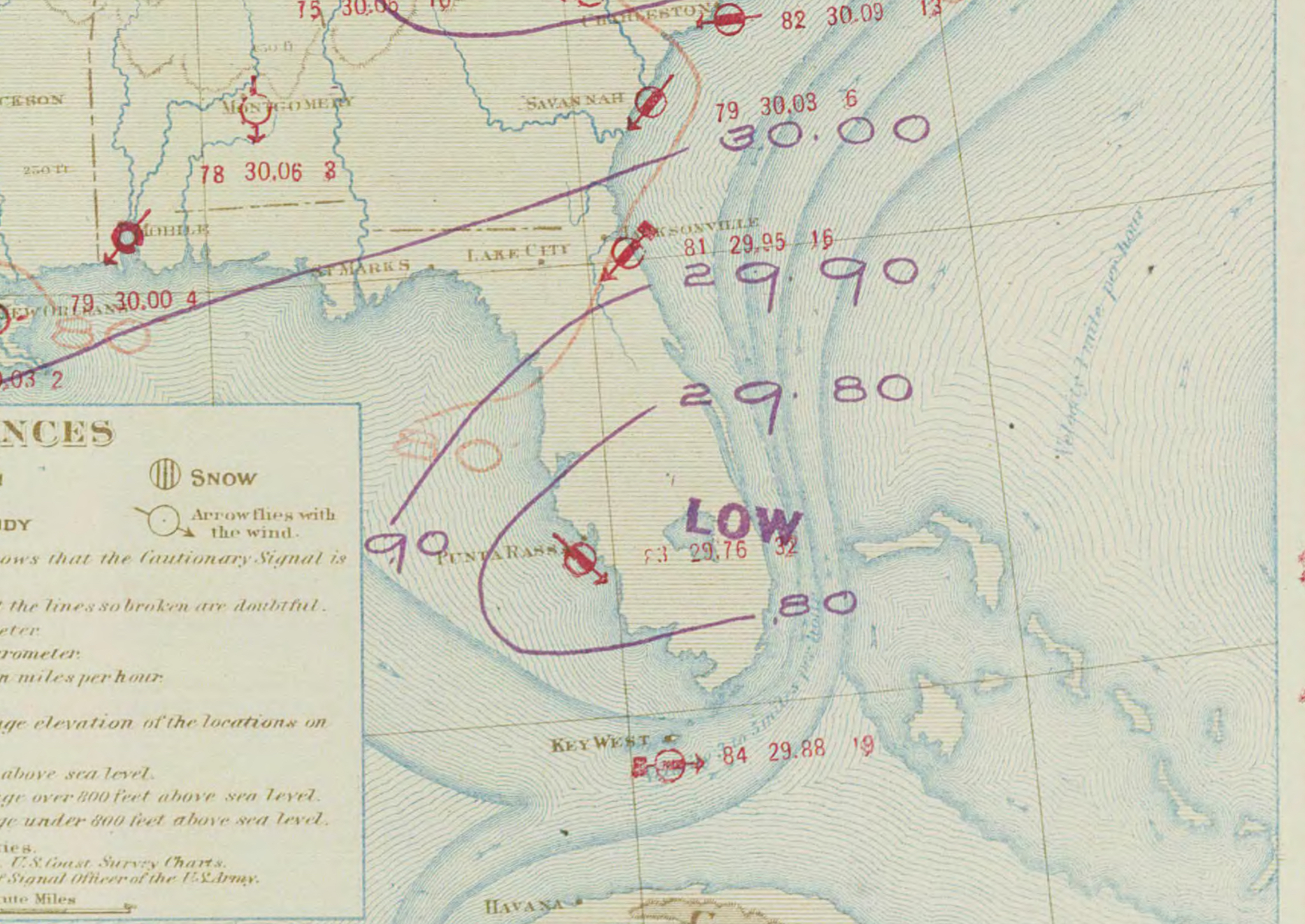
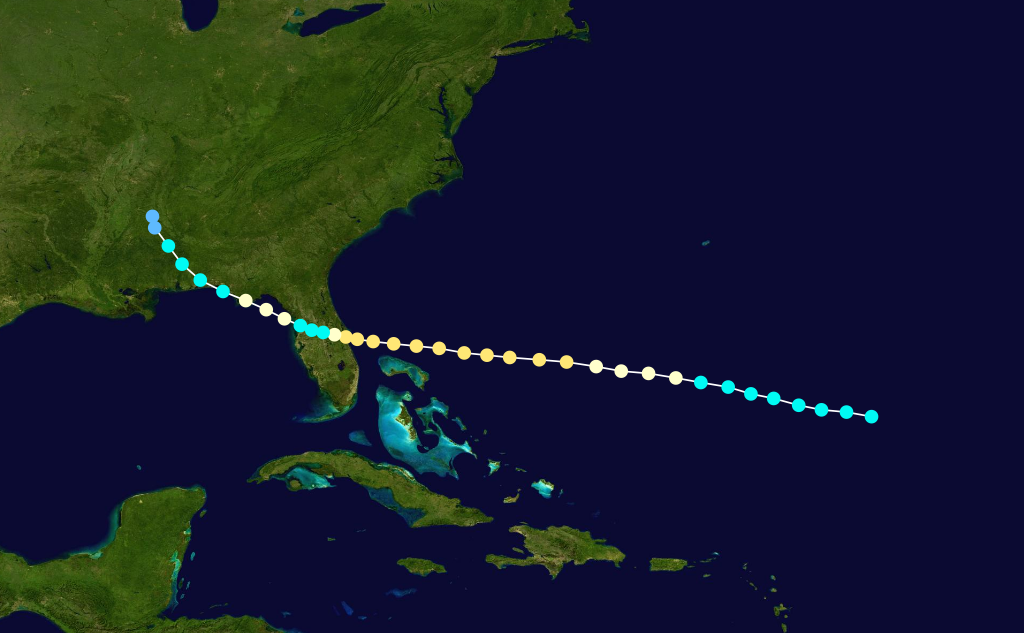
- Duration: August 24 – September 1
- Peak intensity: 105 mph (165 km/h) (1-min); ≤972 mbar (hPa)

The Atlantic hurricane database begins the track for this system about 560 mi (900 km) northeast of the Lesser Antilles around 00:00 UTC on August 24, one day before the brig M.A. Dorian encountered it. Moving west-northwestward, the storm likely intensified into a hurricane early on August 26. That day, the schooner S.A. Snow and brig H. Houston capsized south of Bermuda, while the hurricane also dismasted the Saint Jose. Early on August 27, the cyclone intensified into a Category 2 hurricane on the modern-day Saffir-Simpson scale and peaked with winds of 105 mph (165 km/h). As the storm approached Florida on August 29, the steamship Morgan City recorded hurricane-force winds and a barometric pressure of 972 mbar (28.70 inHg), the lowest in relation to the system. The storm would retain that intensity until after making landfall just to the south of Cocoa Beach around 12:00 UTC. It passed over the peninsula and weakened to a tropical storm, but managed to become a hurricane prior to its second Florida landfall near Apalachicola early on August 31. The storm continued northwestward, dissipating over Mississippi on September 1. Chenoweth's study initiates the storm a week earlier off Cap-Vert, West Africa, showing a west-northwest course over the Cape Verde islands and across the subtropical Atlantic, but otherwise depicts a similar path for the remainder of the storm's lifespan. It also lists the storm as a major hurricane at landfall in Central Florida, with an atmospheric pressure of 955 mbar (28.2 inHg).

As the hurricane approached Florida, it wrecked the steamship City of Vera Cruz north of what is now Cape Canaveral, causing 68 deaths. Seven survivors reported that the vessel split into two, drowning anyone who had not abandoned the ship. Additionally, the cyclone wrecked the schooner Rosa Esppinger north of Cape Canaveral and stranded the brig Long Beach at Turtle Mound and two other ships near the Ponce de Leon Inlet. On land, storm surge flooded barrier islands and many coastal waterways. Heavy rainfall inundated post roads and washed away many bridges in Central Florida, disrupting communications by mail between Ocala and Tampa. The storm was of great force in Volusia and Orange counties. At Sanford, it felled a large church building and a warehouse, along with several homes. The storm also destroyed homes at Enterprise and Orange City. Winds tore apart and downed fruit trees, along with entire forests. The Ocklawaha River overflowed, submerging docks. The storm was said to be even more severe south of Volusia County. At DeLand, the storm snapped large pine trees, wrecked fences, and leveled outbuildings. It destroyed a cottage as well. Cedar Key observed a sustained wind speed of 64 mph (103 km/h) before the anemometer was damaged, while Pensacola recorded sustained winds of 32 mph (51 km/h). A dispatch from Tallahassee said "a tremendous quantity of rain fell", adding that gusty winds downed some trees and fences, while shearing off tree canopies. It also mentioned unconfirmed reports of "some sort of destruction" at Punta Rassa, well to the south, and of a warehouse being wrecked at St. Marks. Crops also suffered significant damage in Florida, with a Weather Bureau report published decades later noting that the storm "turned garden vegetables into seaweed"; losses to cotton were especially heavy at Tallahassee, and to oranges near the Indian River.

=== Hurricane Five ===
- Category 1 hurricane (SSHWS)
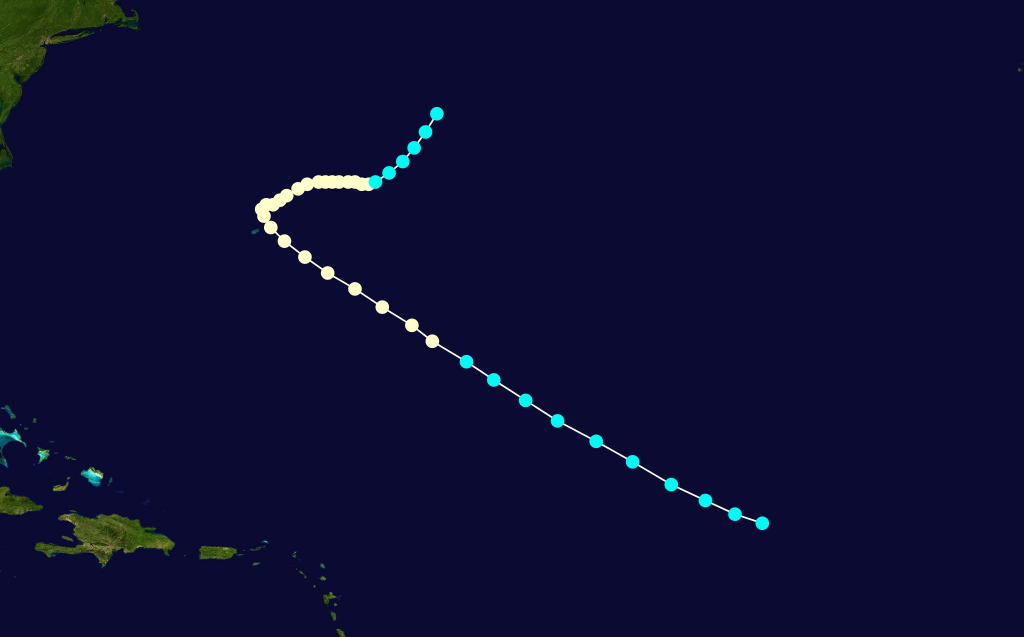
- Duration: August 26 – September 4
- Peak intensity: 90 mph (150 km/h) (1-min); 977 mbar (hPa)

The brig Dorothea encountered a storm roughly halfway between the Leeward Islands and Cabo Verde Islands on August 26. Moving northwestward, the cyclone is estimated to have strengthened into a hurricane about two days later. HURDAT indicates that the storm intensified to maximum sustained winds of 90 mph (150 km/h) on August 30 when it passed near Bermuda, as a steamship coincidentally named Bermuda recorded a barometric pressure of 977 mbar (28.9 inHg) early the next day. Later on August 31, the cyclone curved northeastward and decelerated, before turning eastward on September 1. The system weakened to a tropical storm on September 3 as it curved northeastward and was last noted on the following day about 475 mi (765 km) south-southeast of Sable Island, Nova Scotia.

Chenoweth's reanalysis study indicated that this cyclone formed south of the Cabo Verde Islands on August 22. Moving northwestward, the system did not intensify beyond tropical storm status and was last documented by Chenoweth on August 27, with the cyclone remaining far from Bermuda. The island recorded sustained wind speeds up to 81 mph (130 km/h), disrupting telegraphic communications for several days and causing at least £10,000 ($48,000) in damage to government property alone. The Causeway also suffered damage. One person drowned after being swept overboard the brigantine Anna near Bermuda.

=== Hurricane Six ===
- Category 1 hurricane (SSHWS)
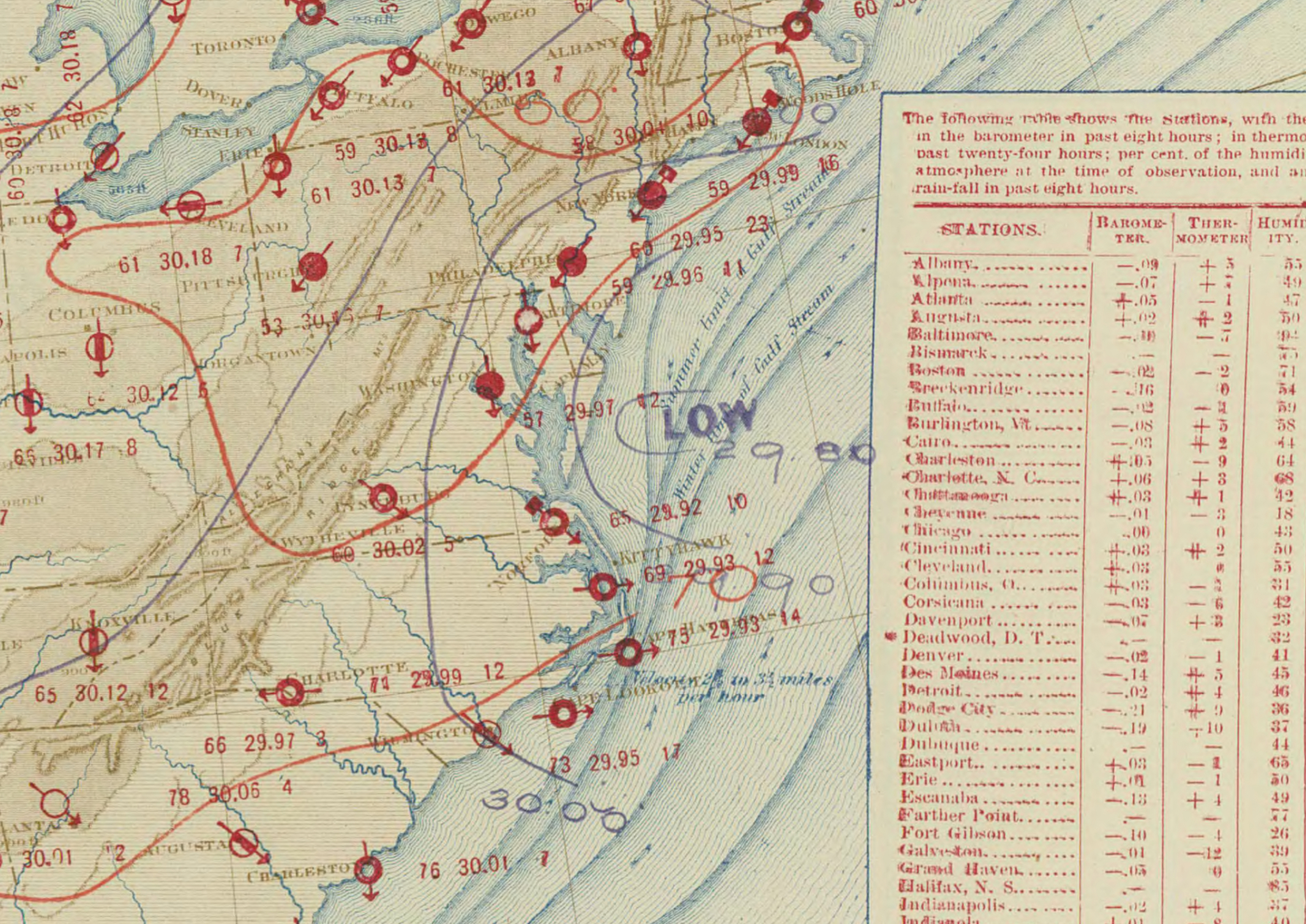
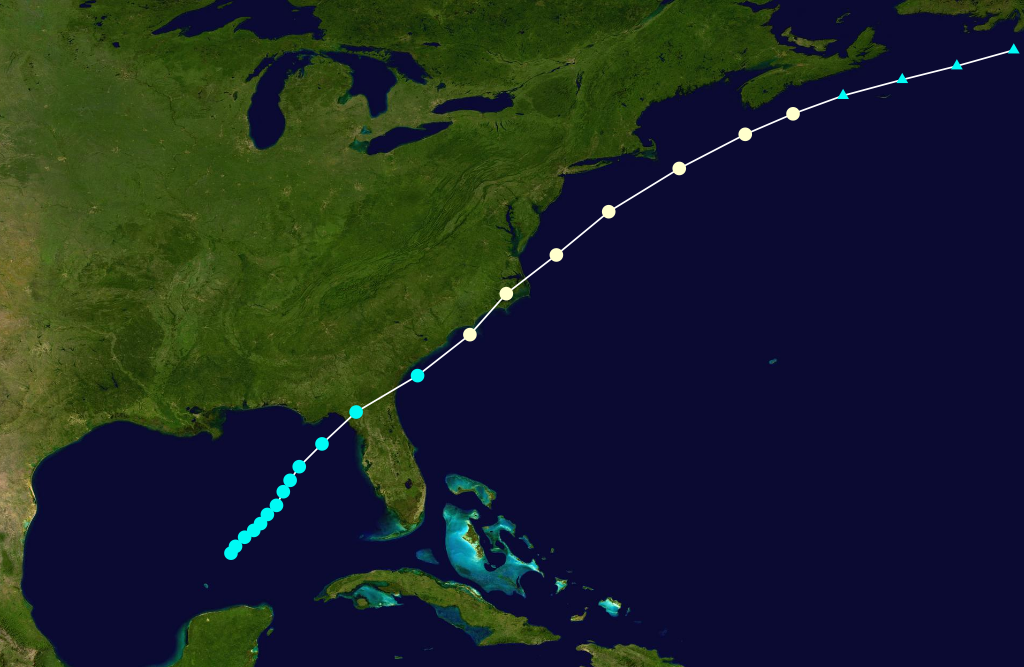
- Duration: September 6 – September 10
- Peak intensity: 80 mph (130 km/h) (1-min); 987 mbar (hPa)

Although the steamship Hutchinson reported a storm on September 5, the official track for this cyclone begins on the following day over the south-central Gulf of Mexico. Moving northeastward, the system struck near Keaton Beach, Florida, at 16:00 UTC on September 8 with winds of 60 mph (95 km/h), several hours before emerging into the Atlantic along the coast of Georgia. Early on September 9, the storm intensified into a hurricane with winds of 80 mph (130 km/h), based on the steamer Arrow observing a barometric pressure of 987 mbar (29.1 inHg). The hurricane then made landfall near Emerald Isle, North Carolina, around 10:00 UTC and re-emerged into the Atlantic a few hours later. Continuing to move up the Northeastern United States coastline, the system became an extratropical storm on September 11 off Nova Scotia.

Chenoweth proposed that this cyclone never existed over the Gulf of Mexico, instead forming near the northeast coast of Cuba on September 4 and moving along the western periphery of the Bahamas before turning northeast on September 5, avoiding landfall in the United States. Florida recorded light rainfall and sustained winds up to 30 mph (48 km/h) at Cedar Key. Several locations along the East Coast of the United States from North Carolina to Massachusetts recorded sustained tropical storm-force winds, peaking at 50 mph (80 km/h) in Cape Henry, Virginia. The Monthly Weather Review noted "considerable damage" around the cape, while a number of small vessels capsized along the coast of New England.

=== Hurricane Seven ===
- Category 1 hurricane (SSHWS)
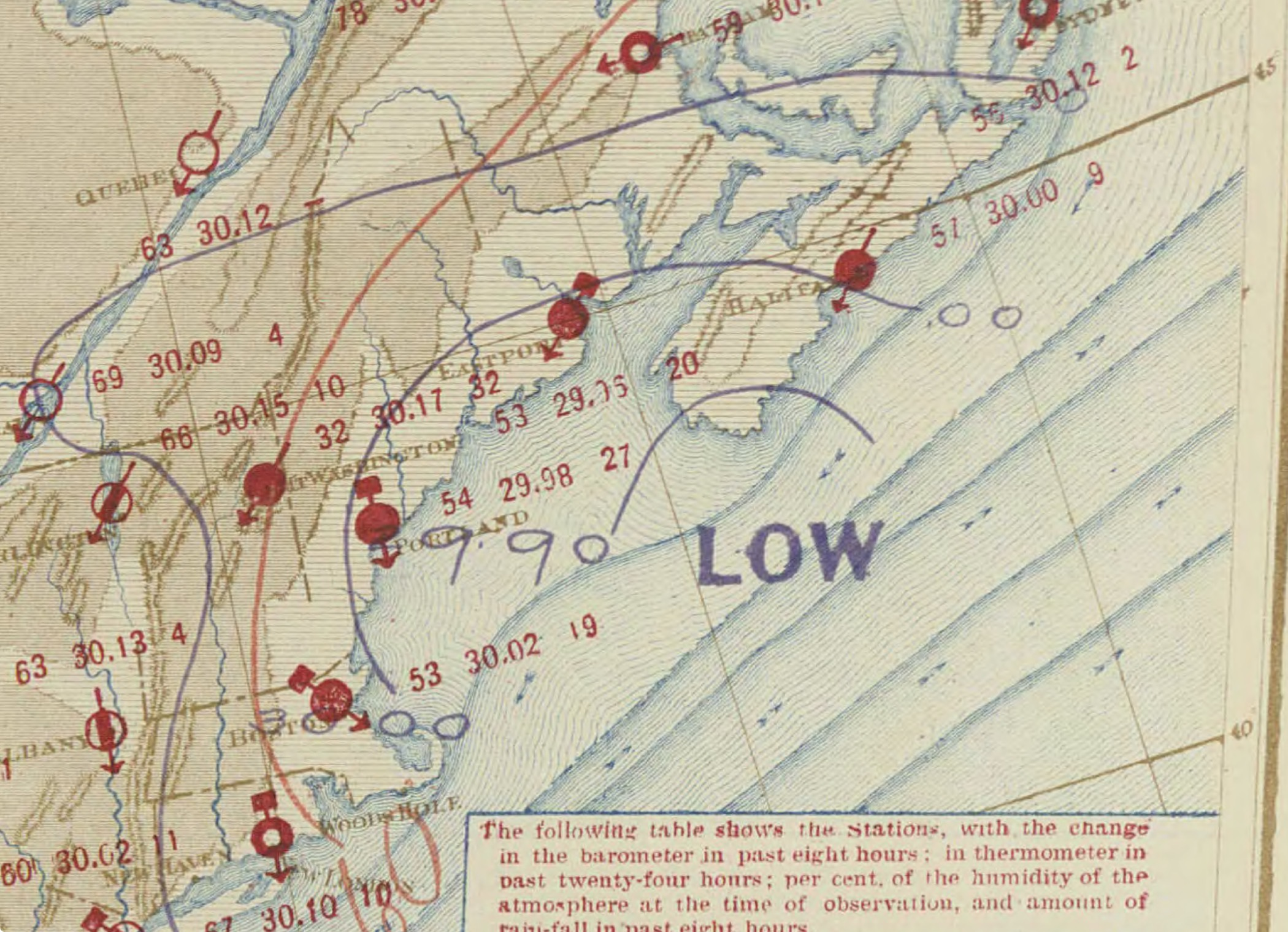
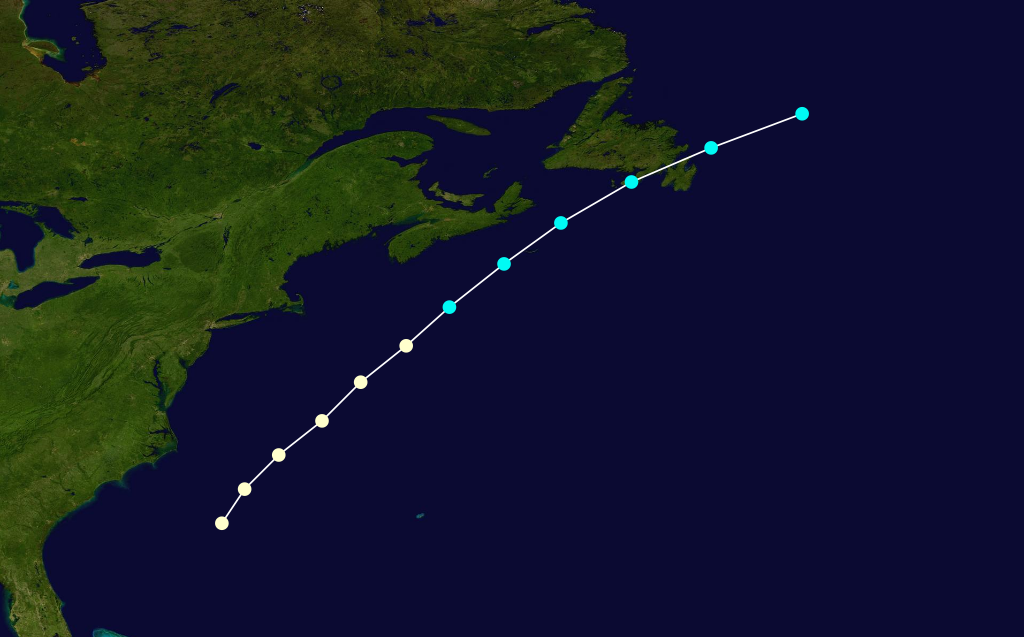
- Duration: September 8 – September 10
- Peak intensity: 90 mph (150 km/h) (1-min); 982 mbar (hPa)

Several ships encountered a hurricane over the western Atlantic on September 8, including the bark Daniel Draper, which observed a barometric pressure of 982 mbar (29.0 inHg). Consequently, HURDAT initiated the track for this storm on that day as a Category 1 hurricane with sustained winds of 90 mph (150 km/h) about 250 mi (400 km) southeast of Cape Lookout, North Carolina. The cyclone moved northeastward and weakened to a tropical storm on September 9. During the following day, the system struck Newfoundland along the Burin Peninsula. The storm re-emerged into the Atlantic later on September 10, shortly before last being seen east of Newfoundland. St. John's, recorded decreasing atmospheric pressures. Chenoweth combined this cyclone with the previous system.

=== Hurricane Eight ===
- Category 4 hurricane (SSHWS)
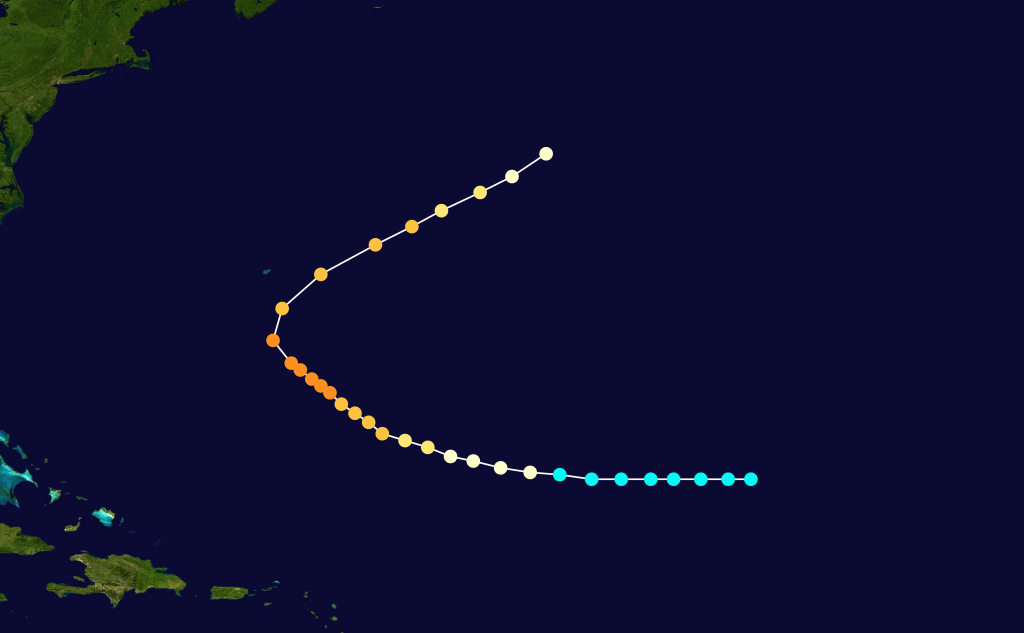
- Duration: September 27 – October 4
- Peak intensity: 140 mph (220 km/h) (1-min); 928 mbar (hPa)

Because the schooner Abe encountered a storm over the central Atlantic on September 27, HURDAT began a track for this cyclone about midway between the Azores, Cabo Verde Islands, and Leeward Islands. Initially trekking westward, the storm intensified into a hurricane on September 29, around the time it turned west-northwestward. The cyclone curved northwestward and strengthened into a major hurricane the next day. On October 1, the system intensified further, becoming a Category 4 hurricane with winds of 140 mph (220 km/h), based on the bark Kalliope reporting a barometric pressure of 928 mbar (27.4 inHg). The hurricane likely maintained that strength throughout October 2 but began weakening while turning northeastward on October 3. By the next day, the storm weakened to a Category 2 hurricane. It was last seen as a Category 1 hurricane on October 4 approximately 575 mi (925 km) southeast of Sable Island, Nova Scotia.

The reanalysis study by Chenoweth argued that the storm formed much farther south. Moving northwestward through October 2, the storm curved northward, before turning to the northeast on the next day. After dipping southeastward for a few days starting on October 5, the cyclone turned north-northeastward on October 8 and continued in that general direction until becoming extratropical well east of Newfoundland on October 10. It never made landfall but did cause several ships to sink.

=== Hurricane Nine ===
- Category 1 hurricane (SSHWS)
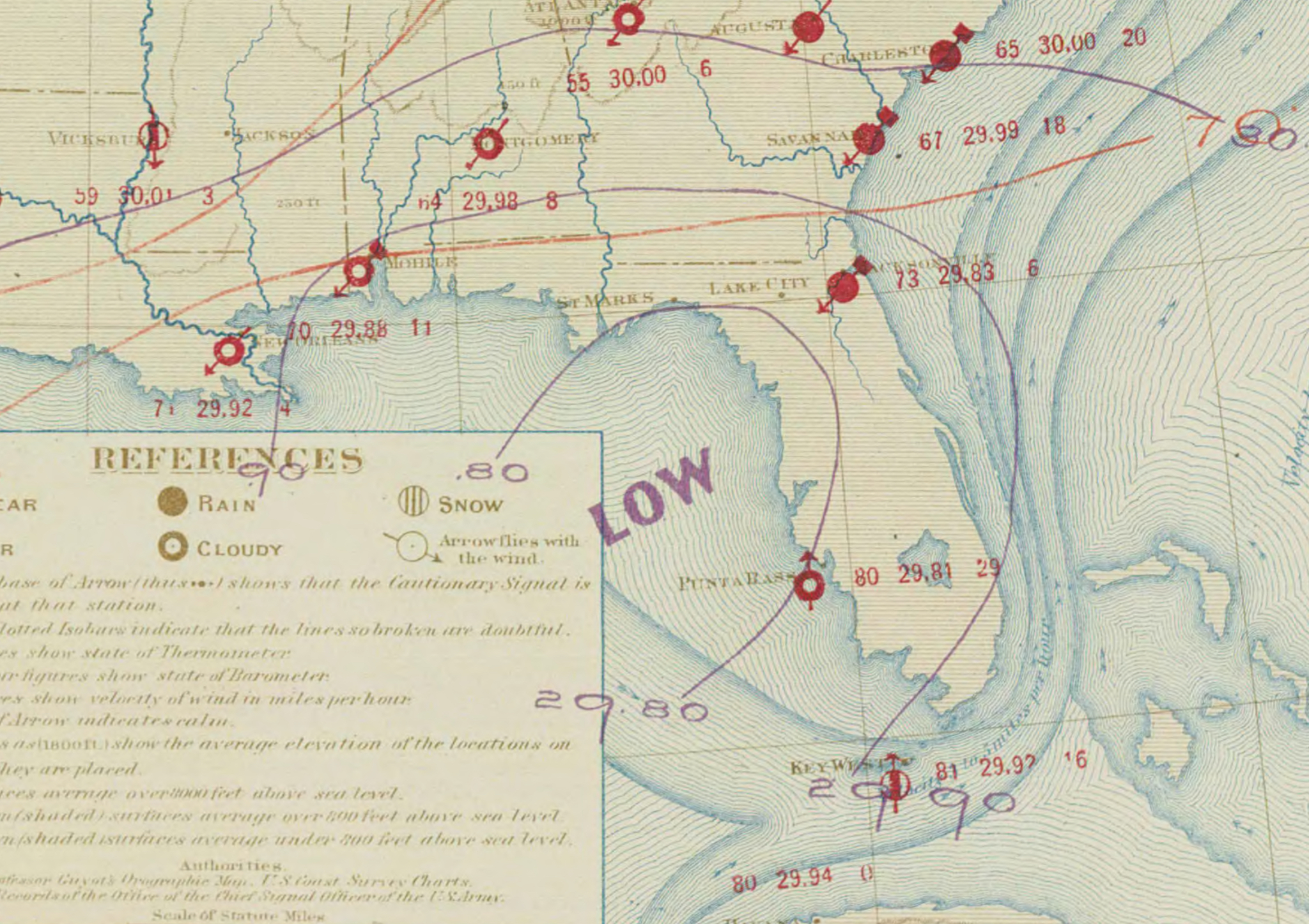
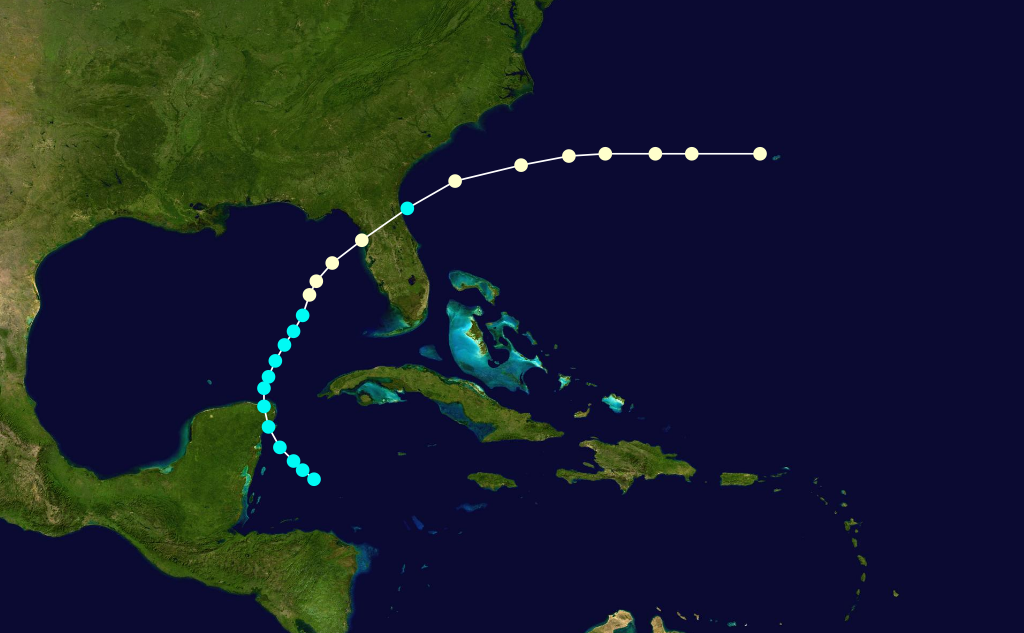
- Duration: October 5 – October 10
- Peak intensity: 80 mph (130 km/h) (1-min); 982 mbar (hPa)

Although Cuban meteorologists documented a storm as early as October 3, the official track begins over the northwestern Caribbean two days later, when barometric pressures began falling in Havana. Early on October 6, the storm clipped the northeastern part of Mexico's Yucatán Peninsula before entering the Gulf of Mexico. Slow intensification occurred as the cyclone turned northeastward over the Gulf of Mexico, becoming a hurricane on October 8 according to several ship reports. At 19:00 UTC that day, the storm made landfall near Crystal River, Florida, with winds of 80 mph (130 km/h) and an estimated barometric pressure of 982 mbar (29.0 inHg). The system briefly weakened to a tropical storm early on October 9 as it emerged into the Atlantic near St. Augustine, but quickly re-strengthened into a hurricane. By October 10, the cyclone turned eastward and was last noted about less than 40 mi (65 km) west-northwest of Bermuda several hours later.

Chenoweth argued that this storm developed several hours later and last tracked it offshore the Carolinas, rather than near Bermuda. Violent gales were reported between Cape Hatteras and Jacksonville. The maximum sustained winds reached 36 mph (58 km/h) at Jacksonville, Florida, and 52 mph (84 km/h) at Savannah, Georgia. Heavy rainfall at Fernandina Beach in the former state flooded roads, leaving them impassable in some low-lying areas, while high tides covered the railroad tracks. In Georgia, St. Simons reportedly experienced its worst storm since 1824, but the Advertiser newspaper of Brunswick noted "there seems to have been little serious damage done to houses, crops and farms." On Bermuda, the Gibbs Hill Lighthouse recorded a minimum barometric pressure of 1,006 mbar (29.7 inHg).

=== Hurricane Ten ===
- Category 1 hurricane (SSHWS)
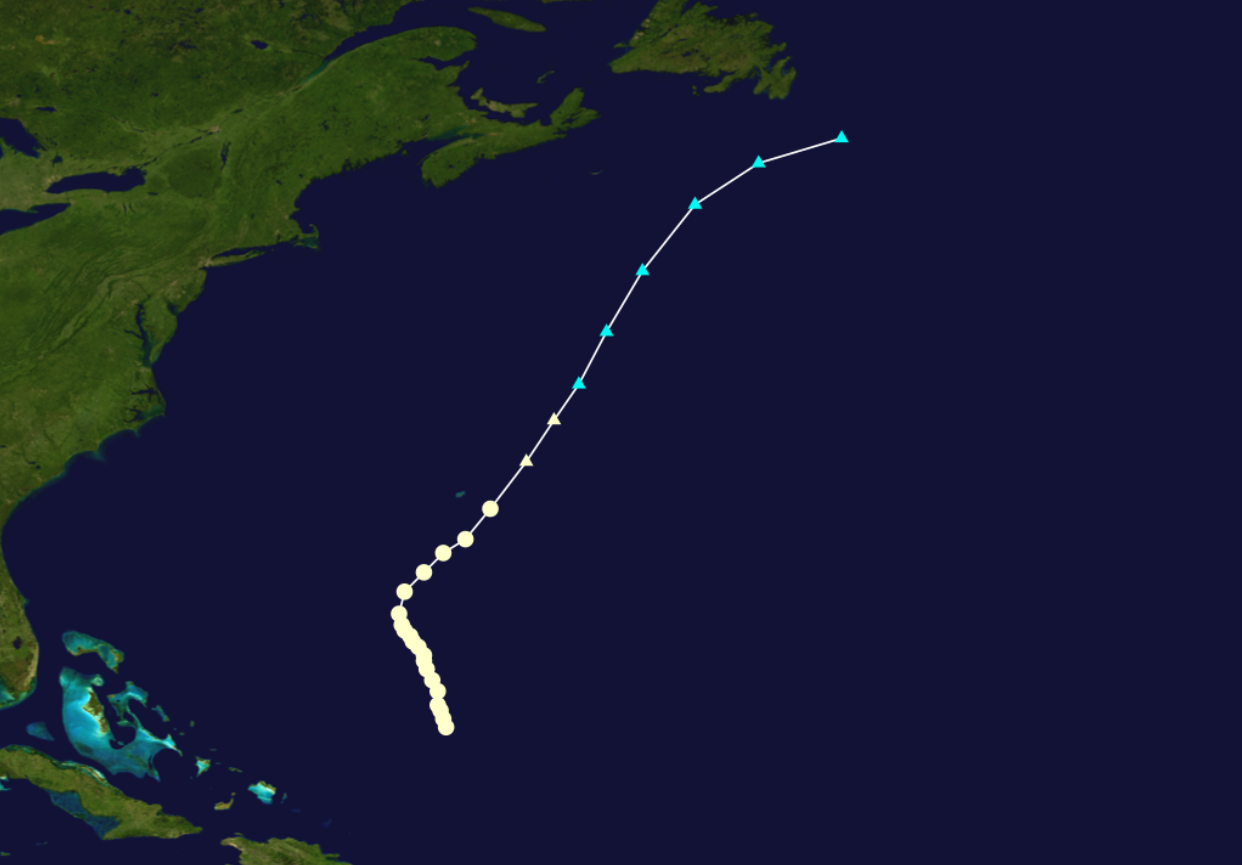
- Duration: October 10 – October 14
- Peak intensity: 90 mph (150 km/h) (1-min); 970 mbar (hPa)

The bark America and ship Sea Witch encountered a hurricane about halfway between Puerto Rico and Bermuda on October 10. Moving slowly northwestward initially, the storm turned northeastward three days later. Based on the streamer Pepita recording a barometric pressure of 970 mbar (29 inHg) on October 13, the cyclone is estimated to have peaked with maximum sustained winds of 90 mph (150 km/h). Late on the next day, the system became extratropical about 150 mi (240 km) northeast of Bermuda and fully dissipated on October 16 offshore Newfoundland.

Chenoweth's reanalysis study argued that this storm turned eastward on October 14 while southeast of Bermuda, rather than its extratropical remnants continuing northeastward towards Atlantic Canada. Bermuda recorded sustained winds up to 46 mph (74 km/h). A number of ships were struck and damaged by the hurricane. The Sea Witch was abandoned and her crew rescued by another ship while a report was received from North Sydney, Nova Scotia, that a schooner, the Annie Linwood, had capsized off Cape Smokey, with all occupants drowning. However, The Morning Herald of Halifax noted on October 23 that "there is no truth in the report" on the Annie Linwood.

=== Tropical Storm Eleven ===
- Tropical storm (SSHWS)
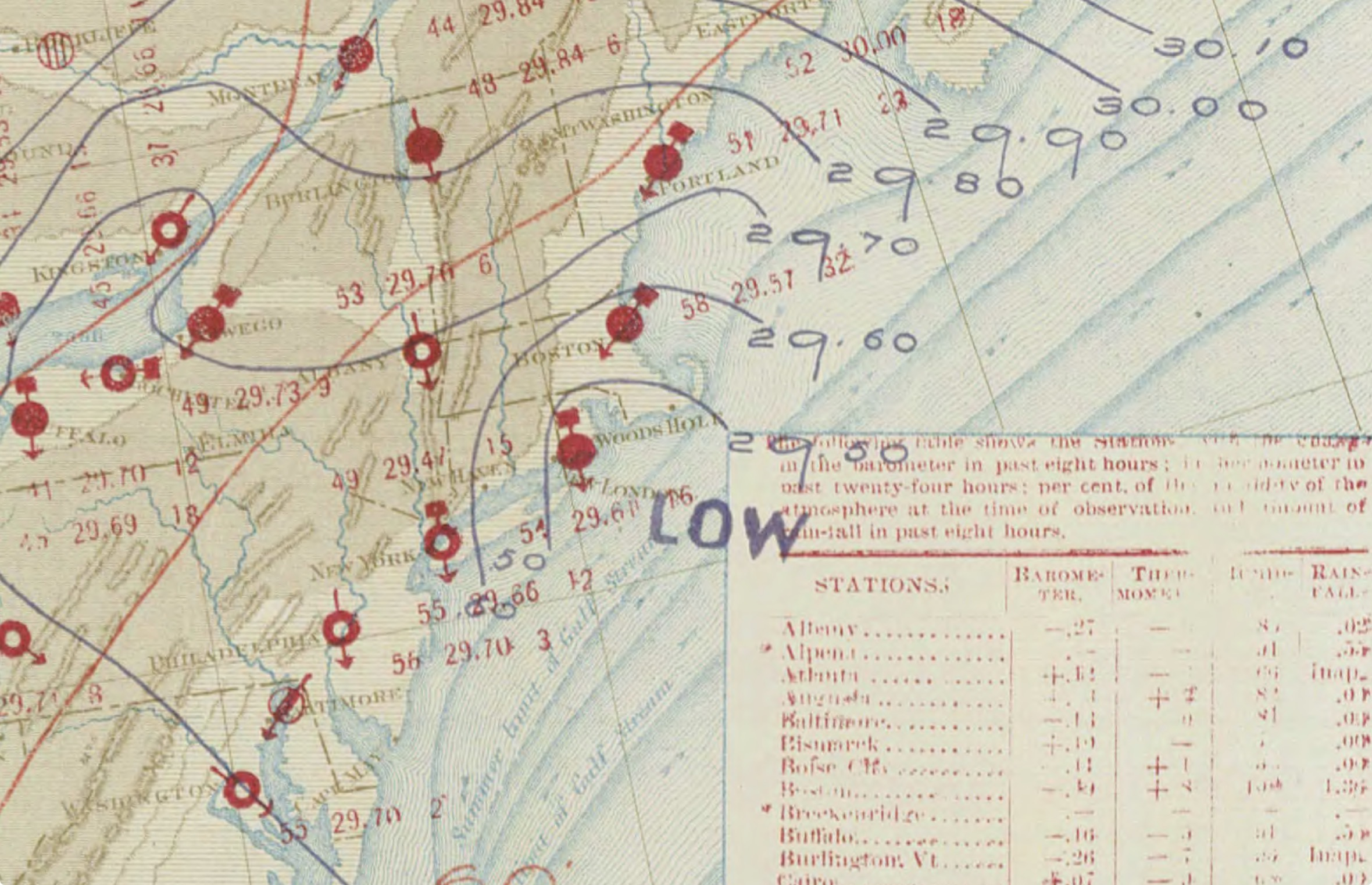
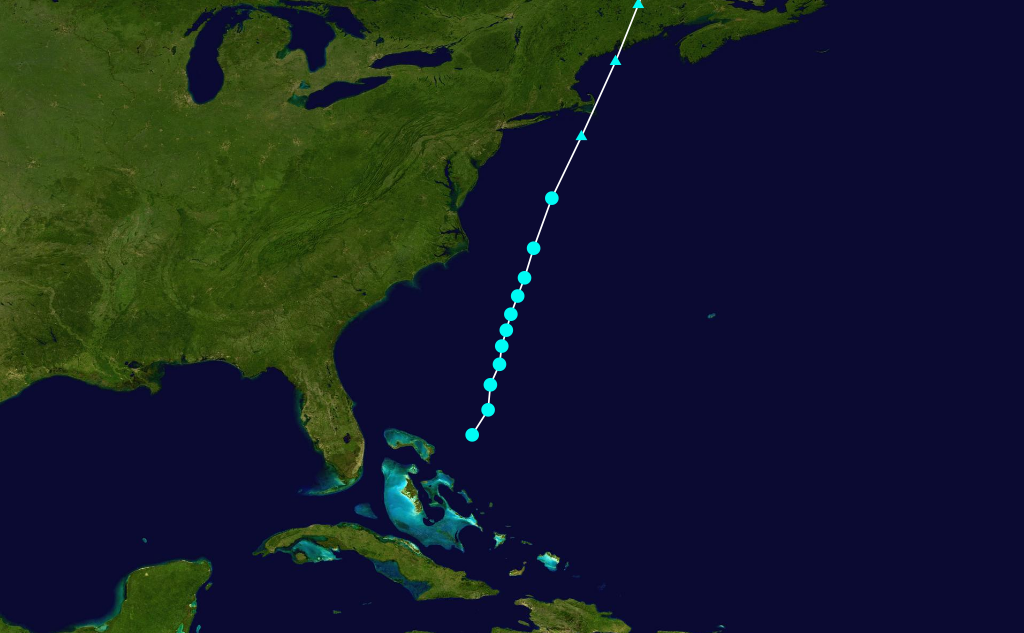
- Duration: October 20 – October 23
- Peak intensity: 70 mph (110 km/h) (1-min);

Coastal North Carolina and Virginia and ships over the southwestern Atlantic reported elevated winds on October 21 and October 22, leading HURDAT to begin the track approximately 110 mi (175 km) east-northeast of the Abaco Islands on October 20. Moving northeastward, the system transitioned into an extratropical cyclone two days later about 75 mi (120 km) south-southwest of Nantucket, Massachusetts. After striking Maine on October 23 as an extratropical storm, Portland recorded a barometric pressure of 991 mbar (29.3 inHg), indicating that the cyclone likely never intensified into a hurricane. Chenoweth also considered this storm an extratropical cyclone. Some locations along the East Coast of the United States observed sustained tropical storm-force winds, peaking at 53 mph (85 km/h) in Eastport, Maine. In Canada, the St. Lawrence River valley, New Brunswick, and Nova Scotia reported severe gales. Several shipping-related disasters occurred along the coast of Nova Scotia.

=== Other storms ===
Chenoweth proposed four other storms not currently listed in HURDAT. The first of the four cyclones developed near the Guanaja in the Honduran Bay Islands on June 9. Later that day, the system made landfall near Corozalito, Belize (then known as British Honduras), and quickly dissipated. Another storm formed about halfway between the Cabo Verde Islands and Senegal on August 28 and moved generally northwestward before being last noted by Chenoweth on August 30. A third unofficial system developed on September 9 in the Bay of Campeche. Late on September 12, the cyclone made landfall near Tuxpan, Veracruz, and rapidly dissipated. The fourth and final proposed system was first documented on September 30 southwest of the Azores. Moving northeastward, the storm passed between Terceira Island and São Miguel Island before becoming extratropical late on October 1.

== Season effects ==
This is a table of all of the known storms that have formed in the 1880 Atlantic hurricane season. It includes their duration, landfall, damages, and death totals. Deaths in parentheses are additional and indirect (an example of an indirect death would be a traffic accident), but were still related to that storm. Damage and deaths include totals while the storm was extratropical, a wave, or a low, and all of the damage figures are in 1880 USD.

1880 North Atlantic tropical cyclone season statistics
Storm name	Dates active	Storm category at peak intensity	Max 1-min wind mph (km/h)	Min. press. (mbar)	Areas affected	Damage (US$)	Deaths	Ref(s).
One	June 21–25	Tropical storm	45 (75)	Unknown	Gulf Coast of the United States (Texas)	Unknown	None	
Two	August 4–14	Category 4 hurricane	150 (240)	931	Lesser Antilles, Mexico (Quintana Roo and Tamaulipas), Texas	>$1 million	30	
Three	August 15–20	Category 1 hurricane	90 (150)	980	Windward Islands, Greater Antilles (Jamaica and Cuba), the Bahamas	>$50,000	30	
Four	August 24 – September 1	Category 2 hurricane	105 (265)	≤972	Southeastern United States (Florida)	Unknown	68	
Five	August 26 – September 4	Category 1 hurricane	90 (150)	977	Bermuda	>$48,000	1	
Six	September 6–10	Category 1 hurricane	80 (130)	987	East Coast of the United States (Florida)	Unknown	None	
Seven	September 8–10	Category 1 hurricane	90 (150)	982	Atlantic Canada (Newfoundland)	Unknown	None	
Eight	September 27 – October 4	Category 4 hurricane	140 (230)	928	None	None	None	
Nine	October 5–10	Category 1 hurricane	80 (130)	982	Southeastern United States (Florida), Bermuda	Unknown	None	
Ten	October 10–14	Category 1 hurricane	90 (150)	970	Bermuda, Nova Scotia	Unknown	Unknown	
Eleven	October 20–23	Tropical storm	70 (110)	Unknown	East Coast of the United States, Eastern Canada	Unknown	None	
Season aggregates
11 systems	June 21 – October 23		150 (240)	928		>$1.098 million	129	

== See also ==
- Atlantic hurricane season
- Tropical cyclone observation
- Atlantic hurricane reanalysis project
