= List of Cuban women writers =

This is a list of women writers who were born in Cuba or whose writings are closely associated with that country.

== A ==
- Alma Flor Ada (born 1938), Cuban-American writer, poet, Professor Emerita
- Brígida Agüero y Agüero (1837–1866), Cuban-born poet
- Mirta Aguirre (1912–1980), poet, novelist, journalist
- Ginny Aiken (born 1955), Cuban-American novelist writing in English
- Magaly Alabau (born 1945), Cuban-American poet, theatre director, actress, writes in Spanish
- Dora Alonso (1910–2001), novelist, short story writer, poet, playwright, children's writer
- María Argelia Vizcaíno (born 1955), Cuban-American historian, journalist, non-fiction writer
- Cristina Ayala (1856–1936), Afro-Cuban poet

== B ==
- Ruth Behar (born 1956), Cuban-American anthropologist, poet, memoirist, non-fiction writer
- Marilyn Bobes (born 1955), poet, novelist
- Juana Borrero (1877–1896), painter, poet
- Dulce María Borrero (1883–1945), poet, feminist

== C ==
- Lydia Cabrera (1899–1991), anthropologist, poet, non-fiction writer
- Ana Cairo Ballester (1949–2019), writer, literature professor
- Julieta Campos (1932–2007), Cuban-Mexican novelist
- Yanitzia Canetti (born 1967), novelist, short story writer, children's writer, translator
- Daína Chaviano (born 1957), Cuban science fiction and fantasy novelist and poet; columnist, editor, translator; now lives in the United States; writes in Spanish and English
- Aurelia Castillo de González (1842–1920), writer
- Domitila García Doménico de Coronado (1847–1938), considered to be the first women to practice journalism in Cuba

== D ==
- Ofelia Domínguez Navarro (1894–1976), journalist, newspaper director, feminist
- Teresa Dovalpage (born 1966), novelist, playwright, living in the United States

== F ==
- María Irene Fornés (1930–2018), Cuban-American playwright, author of Fefu and Her Friends

== G ==
- Cristina García (born 1958), Cuban-American journalist, novelist
- Carolina Garcia-Aguilera (born 1949), Cuban-American novelist, writes in English
- Gertrudis Gómez de Avellaneda (1814–1873), letter writer, poet, novelist, playwright, political activist, lived mainly in Spain
- Wendy Guerra (born 1970), poet, novelist, columnist

== H ==
- Georgina Herrera (1936–2021), Afro-Cuban poet

== I ==
- Ada Maria Isasi-Diaz (1943–2012), Cuban-American theologist, non-fiction writer

== J ==
- María Dámasa Jova Baró (1890–1940), Cuban poet and educator.

== L ==
- Carilda Oliver Labra (1922–2018), poet
- Mary Stanley Low (1912–2007), British-Cuban political activist, surrealist poet, artist and Latin teacher
- Dulce María Loynaz (1902–1997), poet

== M ==
- Beatriz Maggi (1924–2017), Shakespearean scholar
- Renée Méndez Capote (1901–1989), journalist and feminist
- Mayra Montero (born 1952), Cuban-Puerto Rican short story writer, novelist, non-fiction writer
- Nancy Morejón (born 1944), poet, critic, essayist
- Isabel Moya (1961–2018), journalist and feminist

== N ==
- Rafaela Chacón Nardi (1926–2001), poet and educator

== O ==
- Achy Obejas (born 1956), Cuban-American novelist, short story writer, journalist
- Mirta Ojito (born 1964), Cuban-American journalist, non-fiction writer

== P ==
- Hortensia Blanch Pita (1914–2004), Cuban-born non-fiction writer, moved to Mexico
- Juana Rosa Pita (born 1939), poet, translator
- Martina Pierra de Poo (1833–1900), poet

== R ==
- Sandra Abd'Allah-Alvarez Ramírez, Cuban blogger and activist living in Germany
- Mireya Robles (born 1934), Cuban-American novelist, short story writer, critic
- Mirta Rodríguez Calderón, journalist based in Santo Domingo, Dominican Republic
- Ofelia Rodríguez Acosta (1902–1975), novelist, essayist, playwright, feminist
- Emma Romeu, emigrated to Mexico in the early 1990s; since 1996 a non-fiction, children's, and environmental writer; writes in Spanish and English

== S ==
- Mariblanca Sabas Alomá (1901–1983), feminist, journalist, and poet
- Cecilia Samartin (born 1961), Cuban-American novelist, psychologist; best-selling novelist in Norway; now lives in California
- Cristina Saralegui (born 1948), journalist, magazine editor, television presenter
- Anna Lidia Vega Serova (born 1968), Russian-born Cuban poet, novelist, short story writer
- Ana María Simo (born 1943), Cuban-American playwright, novelist, essayist
- Karla Suárez (born 1969), novelist, short story writer, travel writer

== T ==
- Nivaria Tejera (1929–2016), poet, novelist

== U ==
- Úrsula Céspedes (1832–1874), poet

== V ==
- Zoé Valdés (born 1959), novelist, screenwriter, journalist, magazine editor
- María Villar Buceta (1899–1977), poet, journalist, and librarian

== W ==
- Sylvia Wynter (born 1928), Cuban-born Jamaican novelist, playwright, critic, essayist

== See also ==
- List of Cuban writers
- List of Cuban American writers
- List of women writers
- List of Spanish-language authors
