= List of Cuban writers =

A list of Cuban writers, including novelists, poets, and critics: Cuban authors and writers have influenced and shaped the history of the world. Throughout the years many of their contributions have caused radical shifts: from social movements to global perspectives in the Americas and beyond.

== A ==
- Brígida Agüero (1837–1866), poet
- Mirta Aguirre (1912–1980), poet, novelist, and journalist
- Magaly Alabau (born 1945), poet
- Dora Alonso (1910–2001), author and journalist
- Reinaldo Arenas (1943–1990), openly gay poet, novelist, and playwright, author of Before Night Falls (Antes que anochezca)

== B ==
- Emilio Bacardi Moreau (1844–1822), poet, writer, playwright, and patriot
- Joaquín Badajoz (born 1972), poet and writer
- Gastón Baquero (1916–1997), poet and writer
- Miguel Barnet (born 1940), anthropologist and testimonialist
- Antonio Benítez-Rojo (1931–2005), author and critic
- Pedro Luis Boitel (1931–1972), poet and dissident
- Mariano Brull (1891–1956), postmodern poet

== C ==
- Lydia Cabrera (1899–1991), anthropologist and poet
- Guillermo Cabrera Infante (1929–2005), novelist, author of Tres tristes tigres, Cervantes Prize winner
- Onelio Jorge Cardoso (1914–1986), screenwriter and short fiction writer
- Alejo Carpentier (1904–1980), novelist, author of El reino de este mundo, Cervantes Prize winner
- Julián del Casal, 19th-century poet
- Fidel Castro (1926–2016), former President of Cuba
- Daniel Chavarria, (1933–2018) Uruguayan-born author
- Daína Chaviano (born 1957), novelist and short-story writer
- Enrique Cirules (1938–2016), novelist and essayist
- Domitila García de Coronado (1847–1938), writer, journalist, editor, professor

== D ==
- Edmundo Desnoes (1930–2023), novelist, author of Memorias del Subdesarrollo
- Jesús Díaz (1941–2002), novelist, filmmaker, and intellectual, founder of the influential cultural magazine Encuentro
- Tania Díaz Castro (1939–2024), journalist and poet

== E ==
- Darío Espina Pérez (October 25, 1920 – September 6, 1996), writer, founder and president of La Academia Poética de Miami
- Jorge Enrique Lage (September 16, 1979), writer, novelist

== F ==
- Samuel Feijóo (1914–1992), author
- Roberto Fernández Retamar (1930–2019), poet, essayist, and literary critic
- Norberto Fuentes (born 1943), author and journalist

== G ==
- Michael John Garcés (born 1967), playwright and director.
- Gertrudis Gómez de Avellaneda (1814–1873), novelist, playwright, and poet, author of Sab (1842) and Baltasar (1858)
- Justo González (born 1937), author and historian
- Jorge Enrique González Pacheco (born 1969), poet and cultural entrepreneur
- Nicolás Guillén (1902–1989), Afro-Cuban poet
- Pedro Juan Gutiérrez (born 1950) "dirty realist" novelist, poet, and painter

== H ==
- José María Heredia y Heredia (1803–1839), poet
- Georgina Herrera (1936–2021), poet

== L ==
- Carilda Oliver Labra (1922–2018), poet
- José Lezama Lima (1910–1976), novelist and poet, author of Paradiso
- Eduardo del Llano (born 1962)
- Mary Stanley Low (1912–2007), British-Cuban political activist, surrealist poet, artist and Latin teacher

== M ==
- Jorge Mañach (1898–1961), writer
- Juan Francisco Manzano (1797–1854), author and poet
- Dulce María Loynaz (1902–1997), poet, Cervantes Prize winner
- José Martí (1853–1895), poet, journalist, critic, translator, and patriot
- Calixto Martínez, journalist and political prisoner
- Rubén Martínez Villena (1899–1934), writer
- Jamila Medina Ríos (1981), poet, author, critic
- Domingo del Monte (1804–1853), author and literary critic
- Nancy Morejón (born 1944), Afro-Cuban poet
- Dolan Mor (born 1968)
- Manuel Maria Mustelier (1878–1941), writer and teacher

== O ==
- Fernando Ortiz (1881–1969), author and essayist
- Lisandro Otero (1932–2008), novelist and journalist

== P ==
- Heberto Padilla (1932–2000), poet
- Leonardo Padura Fuentes (born 1955), novelist and journalist
- Ricardo Pau-Llosa (born 1954), poet
- Regino Pedroso (1896–1983), poet
- Gustavo Pérez Firmat (born 1949), poet, memoirist, literary critic
- Jorge Armando Pérez (born 1961), writer, theologian, fiction
- Virgilio Piñera (1912–1979), author, playwright, poet, short-story writer and essayist
- Carlos Pintado (born 1974), poet

== R ==
- Félix Ramos y Duarte (1848–1924), educator, textbook writer and lexicographer
- José Ignacio Rivero (1920–2011), exile journalist
- Raúl Rivero (1945–2021), dissident poet and journalist
- Antonio Rodríguez Salvador (born 1960), poet, fiction writer, dramatist and essayist

== S ==
- Pedro Pérez Sarduy (born 1943), poet, novelist and journalist
- Severo Sarduy (1937–1993), neobaroque poet
- Ana María Simo, playwright, essayist and lesbian activist

== U ==
- Úrsula Céspedes (1832–1874), poet

== V ==
- Zoé Valdés (born 1959), novelist
- Enrique José Varona (1848–1933), author and journalist
- Camilo Venegas (born 1967), writer and journalist
- Cirilo Villaverde (1812–1894), novelist, author of Cecilia Valdés (1882)
- Cintio Vitier (1921–2009), poet, essayist and novelist

== Z ==
- Juan Clemente Zenea (1832–1871), author and poet
- Héctor Zumbado (1932–2016), writer, journalist, humorist, and critic

== See also ==
- List of Cuban women writers
- Cuban literature
- List of Cuban American writers
- List of Latin American writers
