= Last Rumba in Havana =

2001 novel by Fernando Velázquez Medina

- Author: Fernando Velázquez Medina
- Language: Spanish
- Publication date: 2001

Last Rumba in Havana is a novel by the Afro-Cuban dissident writer and journalist Fernando Velázquez Medina, who was born in Havana in 1951. It was published in New York in December 2001 by the Hispanic newspaper chain Hoy LLC, and boasts a cover designed by the Colombian artist Juan Arango.

== Style ==
The story is framed within the so-called dirty realism of Latin America (led by the famous Cuban Pedro Juan Gutiérrez). Spanish critic and poet Pablo Martinez Zarracina said in an article on Cuban literature published in El Norte de Castilla Lyrics that the book is considered to be an important work of this movement along with "Dirty Havana Trilogy" by Gutierrez. The author was interviewed on television both in the Big Apple and Miami, and several Hispanic newspapers (such as La Opinión in Los Angeles) cited the book in their cultural pages. In June 2009, the Chilean journalist Pedro Scharwze published a story on "Last Rumba in Havana" on the occasion of its re-release in Spain by Editorial Baile del Sol Canary Islands, with a cover designed by the Cuban graphic artist Yailen Rivera based on an idea of Jesus Rivera's father who was a painter. The book was praised by authors as diverse as the Spanish novelist Antonio Muñoz Molina; the Cuban poet Raúl Rivero; Cuban narrators Norberto Fuentes, Teresa Dovalpage, Felix Luis Viera and Antonio Benítez-Rojo; Édouard Manet and the French Machover Jacob; and Spanish critic Mendoza Apuleius Pío Serrano. The Spanish researcher Beatriz Calvo said that along with works by Daína Chaviano and Zoé Valdés, "Last Rumba in Havana" was among the most outstanding books crafted by writers in exile on the situation of women in Cuba. Accolades continued, as the Mexican poet Raúl Caballero published an article about the book in El Nuevo Herald of Miami, commenting that its title says it all and the work delivers a new aspect of Cuban literature.

== Plot ==
The book chronicles the life of an architecture student turned prostitute. It portrays the reality of the notorious Cuban prostitutes who cater only to foreigners. The author delivers fragments of this life through a long monologue, starting with tales of sordid and violent episodes of childhood in the Havana neighborhood of Jesus Maria. With a nihilistic vision of Cuban society, he pursues his character's story both in the poor neighborhoods and those of high-ranking Cuban luxury hotels as well as prisons. It is a journey through the lost paradise that never officially existed. The dialogue is broken occasionally by insertions of short stories, poems, imaginary telephone conversations, proverbs and other resources, giving it a lyrical quality.

== Characters ==
Throughout the text, the name of Dolphin is repeated, the first-love teen protagonist who was murdered. It also highlights Manca, a friend of main character John the Dead, who makes a brief appearance but is important because of the theme of child prostitution. As in John Dos Passos' novel Manhattan Transfer, dozens of characters swarm in and out of the action like extras in a movie. But they are real characters, some intellectuals and some dissidents in Cuba.

== Theme ==
The novel delves into the spirit of transgression, amorality, and the blooming of youth in an amoral society. The story unfolds over three days in the life of a Cuban prostitute and culminates with the scandalous uprising that took place in Havana in August 1994. The extraordinary sense of alienation, racism inherent in any dictatorship, lack of hope, and the irrational impulse to leave the country by any means, create an amazing atmosphere that culminates in an outburst of violence told by an anonymous and unnamed protagonist.

== Reception ==
Although the book was greeted with silence in the Cuban community (especially in newspapers in Miami with Cuban influence), the reaction among Latin American intellectuals living in the U.S. was quite different. ABC Dominican, a literary magazine, interviewed the author. La Opinion of Los Angeles published a laudatory review, and other newspapers (including New York Today and The Dallas Star) reviewed the book. The author was also quoted on the digital page Rinconete, the Instituto Cervantes, as one of the new Cuban-born writers. In addition, the Madrid newspaper ABC published an article saying that the well-known writer Norberto Fuentes placed the author of "Last Rumba in Havana" among the most important writers in exile. With all of this support the book sold ten thousand copies, but a sector of the Cuban exile's community branded it as "pornographic."

== Notes ==
- Article was created based on a translation of the Spanish language Wikipedia article.
