= Disability in Cuba =

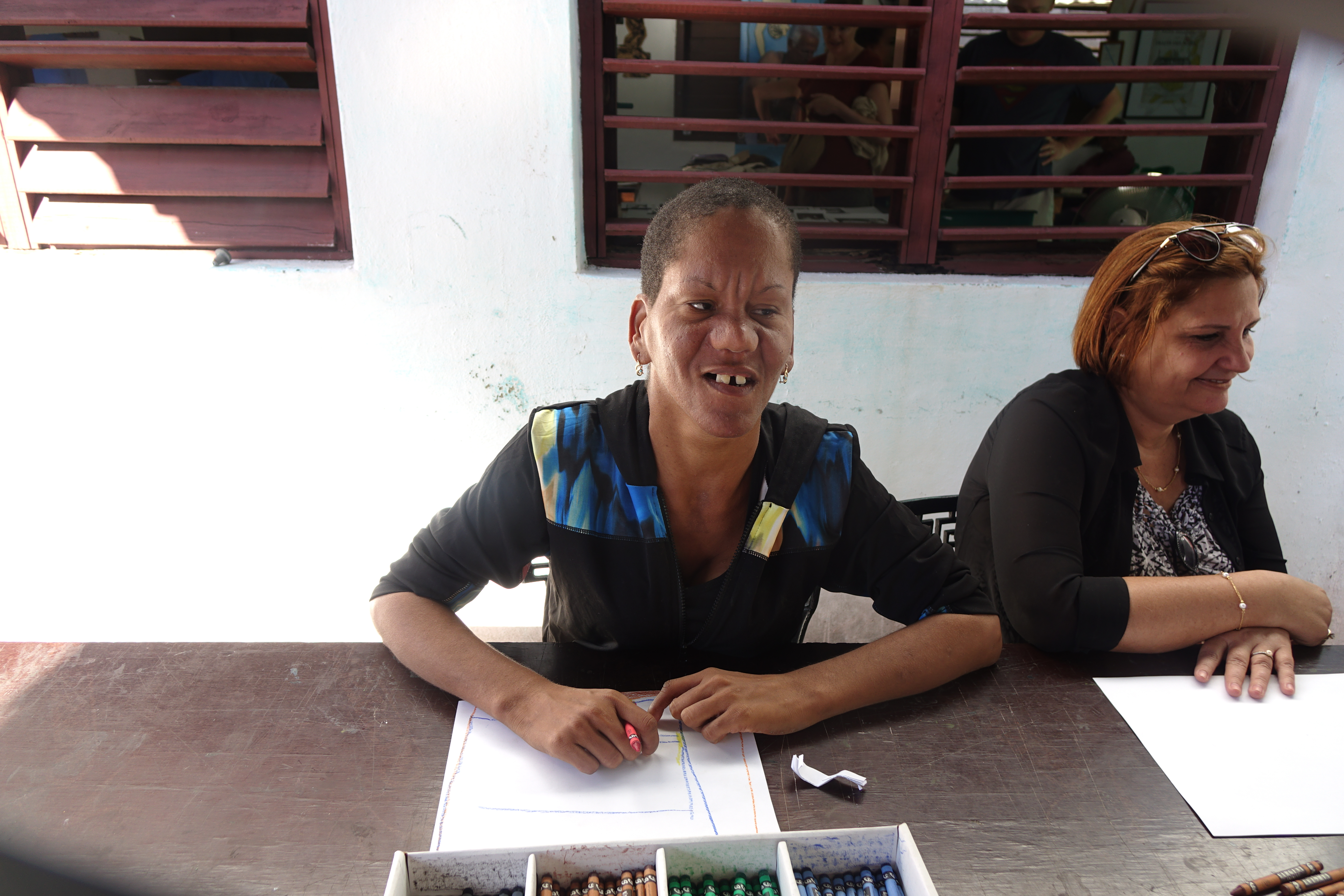
In Cienfuegos, a non-profit group is teaching art to people with disabilities in Cuba.

There are around 447,600 people with disability in Cuba. A large number of people with disabilities in Cuba have an intellectual disability and about 3.2 percent have a severe disability. The government of Cuba has a medical model of disability in its approach to policies on people with disabilities. Another unique challenge that people with disabilities in the country face is due to the economic embargo of Cuba which has caused shortages in medical materials and assistive technology. The Constitution of Cuba has provisions for protecting the rights of people with disabilities and the country signed onto the Convention on the Rights of Persons with Disabilities in 2007.

== Demographics ==
According to Humanity & Inclusion, around one third of people with disabilities in Cuba have an intellectual disability. Around 3.2% have a severe disability. Recent numbers, in 2018, showed that there were 447,674 people with disabilities living in the country and 46.3 percent of this number were women.

There are around 19,000 users of Cuban Sign Language (Lengua de Señas Cubana LSC). As of 2019, there are more than 300 interpreters of sign language in the country.

== Policy ==
Cuba largely follows a medical model of disability in its policies. The National Council to Support Persons with Disabilities (CONAPED) was created in 1996 to implement programs and policies to protect the rights of people with disabilities. The National Action Plan of the country includes provisions for people with disabilities and which is carried out by CONAPED. Promoting the rights of people with disabilities and providing accessibility and other services were part of the country's Millennium Development Goals (MDGs).

Cubans can also access social security through the Social Security Act. Parents of children with disabilities are provided a subsidy. The Ministry of Labor and Social Security has reported that around 35,500 people with disabilities receive social assistance.

Cuban healthcare is free and locally provided with healthcare workers living in the same communities they serve. The healthcare service provides various rehabilitation services for adults with disabilities. Each person has a medical team assigned to them after being diagnosed with a "potential disability." Psychiatric hospitals require free and informed consent for medical procedures.

Discrimination on the basis of disability is prohibited, according to the Constitution of Cuba. However, making complaints to the government is often ineffective. The Attorney General's Office received 129 complaints of discrimination based on disability in 2014 and 23 percent were considered to be "well-founded."

Overall, the government considers the rate of violence against women and children with disabilities to be low and does not plan to open shelters for people in this category.

Disaster preparedness has been ramped up since 2015 with a project called Prepared Towns (Ciudades Preparadas) which has trained more than 3,000 people with disabilities and their family members to be ready for a disaster.

=== Non-governmental organizations ===
Handicap International has been working in Cuba since 1998. The program helps families work with children who have disabilities and increases awareness especially about intellectual disabilities. Other programs include helping Cubans with disabilities and employment issues and also to provide training for disaster preparedness.

The National Association of the Blind (Asociación Nacional del Ciego ANCI) also has a strong presence in Cuba. ANCI holds a congress with over 200 delegates from around the country each year. The National Association of Deaf works with people who are Deaf or who are deafblind.

In 2014, the European Union and CBM worked to procure assistive technology for people with disabilities.

=== Legislation ===
Laws in Cuba are often based on a medical model of disability and are not oriented towards a "human rights-based approach." There is no specific legislation protecting the rights of people with disabilities. Laws regarding civil situations can annul the legal capacity of people with various disabilities, including deafness and mental illness.

Ministerial Resolution Number 13/85 provides the necessity to identify and provide education for children with disabilities.

Article 89 of the Constitution of Cuba protects the rights of people with disabilities.

Cuba signed onto the Convention on the Rights of Persons with Disabilities in 2007.

=== Education ===
The Constitution of Cuba specifies that children with either physical, intellectual or developmental disabilities must be identified and provided education. Such children are identified through the Center for Orientation and Diagnosis and then are provided services through the Ministry of Education. Students may be placed in a special education class or sent to a special school. Students who cannot attend school can have lessons given to them at home or at the hospital.

Special education training for teachers consists of one seminar of training.

Children with disabilities in the country have, over time, face difficulties because specialists in their care have declined over time.

Cuban sign language began to be taught in special schools starting in 1994.

== Accessibility ==
Cuba has listed accessibility standards, however as of 2019 not all information and communication technologies were fully accessible. The country has been slow to create accessible infrastructure in urban settings.

There is a shortage of assistive devices for people with disabilities in Cuba. People may wait for a long time for items such as prosthesis. Some individuals have waited for around two years to receive prosthesis.

== Cultural attitudes ==
According to journalism professor, Isabel Moya Richard, the cultural revolution in Cuba helped improve the lives of people with disabilities. Moya said that the government providing healthcare, education and access to sports gave people with disabilities a sense of dignity. A tradition of caring for and treating people with disabilities in a warm and welcoming fashion is part of Cuban culture. Families often choose to be involved in the care and treatment of family members with disabilities.

Many families may attribute brujeria or other folk reasons as the cause of an intellectual disability. However, children with disabilities are cared for in their households, most often by female relatives. There is still some social stigma for having a family member with intellectual disability. There are also families who believe it is "a 'blessing' to be the parents of a special child."

== Unique challenges ==
People with disabilities are often unable to access the right of "principle of participation." Individuals who do not support the government have reported discrimination from care services. Individuals working with the Institute for the Defense of Vulnerable Communities (Instituto de Defensa de Comunidades Vulnerable) which is part of the Network of Inclusive Culture Cuba (Red de Cultura Inclusiva Cuba) has faced persecution from the government for their work with ensuring the rights of people with disabilities. Organizations that do not face persecution have members that also support the Cuban government.

The economic embargo of Cuba has also created a shortage of materials which affect people with disabilities. The embargo affects the ability of entities in the country to purchase medicine and medical equipment.

== Sport ==
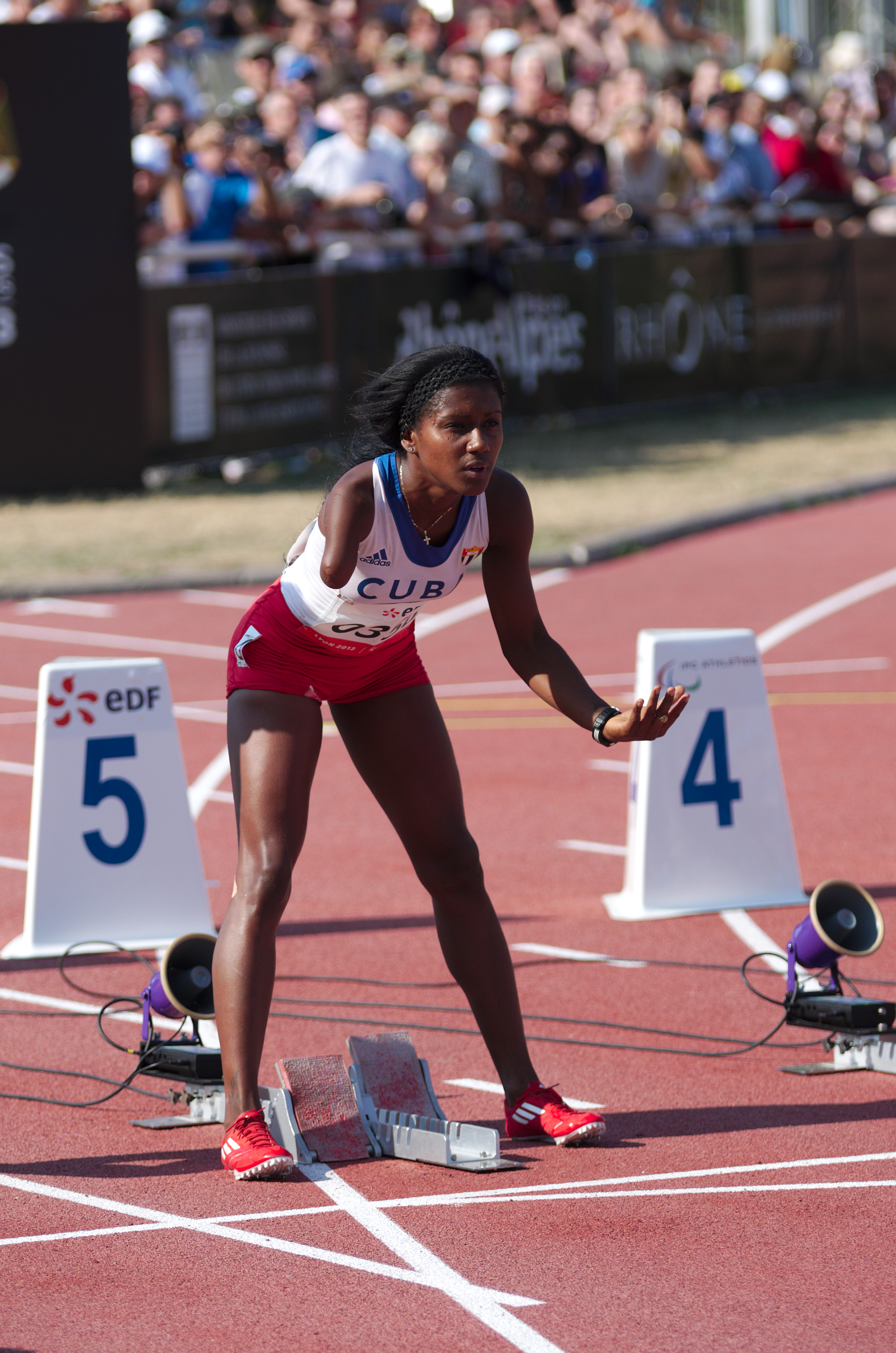
2013 IPC Athletics World Championships, Yunidis Castillo of Cuba preparing for the Women's 100m - T46 second semifinal

The Federación Cubana de Limitados Físico-Motores (ACLIFIM) was created in 1977 and registered with the National Olympic Committee. The ACLIFIM was nationalized on March 14, 1980.

Cuba first competed in the 1992 Paralympic Games and continued to participate in Summer Paralympics.

== See also ==
- Cuba at the Paralympics
- Deafness in Cuba
