= Borrero =

Borrero is a family name of Spanish origin. Originally from Leon, Spain, It may refer to:

- Antonio Borrero (1827–1911), Ecuadorian politician, President of Ecuador 1875–1876
- Ariel Borrero (born 1972), Cuban baseball player
- Clotilde García Borrero (1887–1969), Colombian suffragist, writer
- Derek Emmanuel Borrero (1960-2015) Major League Baseball Pitcher (1980-1982) Cleveland Guardians (Formerly Cleveland Indians)
- Dulce María Borrero (1883–1945), Cuban poet and essayist
- Francisco Manuel de las Heras y Borrero (1951–2013), Spanish historian
- Gloria María Borrero (born 1956), Colombian justice minister
- Ismael Borrero (born 1992), Cuban sport wrestler
- José Ignacio Borrero (1921–2004), Colombian ornithologist
- Juana Borrero (1877–1896), Cuban painter and poet
- Julia Emilia Valdés Borrero (1952), Cuban artist
- Lía Borrero (born 1976), Panamanian beauty queen
- Manuel María Borrero (1883–1975), President of Ecuador in 1938
- Misael Pastrana Borrero (1923–1997), Colombian politician, President of Colombia 1970–1974
- Ramón Borrero y Cortázar (1824–1895), brother of Antonio Borrero, President of Ecuador 1883–1884
- Yordanis Borrero (born 1978), Cuban weightlifter
