= Pedroso =

Pedroso (meaning "stony" in Spanish and Portuguese) may refer to:

== People ==
- Carlos Pedroso (1967–2024), Cuban fencer
- César Pedroso, Cuban pianist
- Eustaquio Pedroso, Cuban baseball player
- Iván Pedroso, Cuban athlete, Olympic and multiple World Champion in long jump
- Nélson Pedroso, Portuguese footballer
- Pastor Argudín Pedroso (1880–1968), Afro Cuban painter
- Paulo Pedroso, Portuguese politician
- Regino Pedroso, Cuban poet
- Ricardo Pedroso, Portuguese swimmer
- Saulo Pedroso (born 1983), Brazilian politician
- Silvano Pedroso Montalvo (1953–2026), Cuban Roman Catholic bishop
- Yadier Pedroso, Cuban baseball player
- Yadisleidy Pedroso, Italian athlete of Cuban origin

== Places ==
- El Pedroso, a municipality in Seville, Spain
- Pedroso, La Rioja, a municipality in La Rioja, Spain
- Pedroso, Portugal, a parish in the municipality of Vila Nova de Gaia, Portugal
- Pedroso, Cantabria, a place in the municipality of Villacarriedo, Cantabria, Spain
- Pedroso, Rego, a place in the parish of Rego, Celorico de Basto, Portugal
- Pedroso de Acim, a municipality in Cáceres, Spain
- Villar del Pedroso, a municipality in Cáceres, Spain
- Monte Pedroso, a mountain close to Santiago de Compostela, Spain
- Pedroso (river), a river in the province of Burgos, Spain

== Others ==
- Battle of Pedroso, fought between Galicia and Portugal in 1071
- Pedroso's disease (Chromoblastomycosis), a fungal skin infection
