= Faber Caribbean Series =

Faber Caribbean Series was a series of books published by Faber & Faber with the stated aim "to publish the finest work being produced in the Caribbean and the Caribbean diaspora, in the four major languages of the region: English, French, Spanish and Dutch." Launched in 1998, the series was edited by Kittitian-British writer Caryl Phillips, and aimed to familiarize Anglophone audiences with writers such as Antonio Benitez-Rojo, Maryse Condé and Pedro Juan Gutierrez.

== Titles ==
- Robert Antoni: Blessed is the Fruit
- Plinio Apuleyo Mendoza: The Fragrance of Guava: Conversations with Gabriel Garcia Marquez
- Frank Martinus Arion: Double Play
- Antonio Benitez-Rojo: A View from the Mangrove
- Antonio Benitez-Rojo: Sea of Lentils
- Maryse Condé: I, Tituba
- Maryse Condé: Windward Heights
- Raphael Confiant: Eau de Cafe
- Pedro Juan Gutierrez: The Dirty Havana Trilogy
- Wilson Harris: Palace of the Peacock
- Tip Marugg: The Roar of Morning

== See also ==
- Heinemann Caribbean Writers Series
- Heinemann African Writers Series
