= Maruxa and Coralia Fandiño Ricart =

Spanish sisters

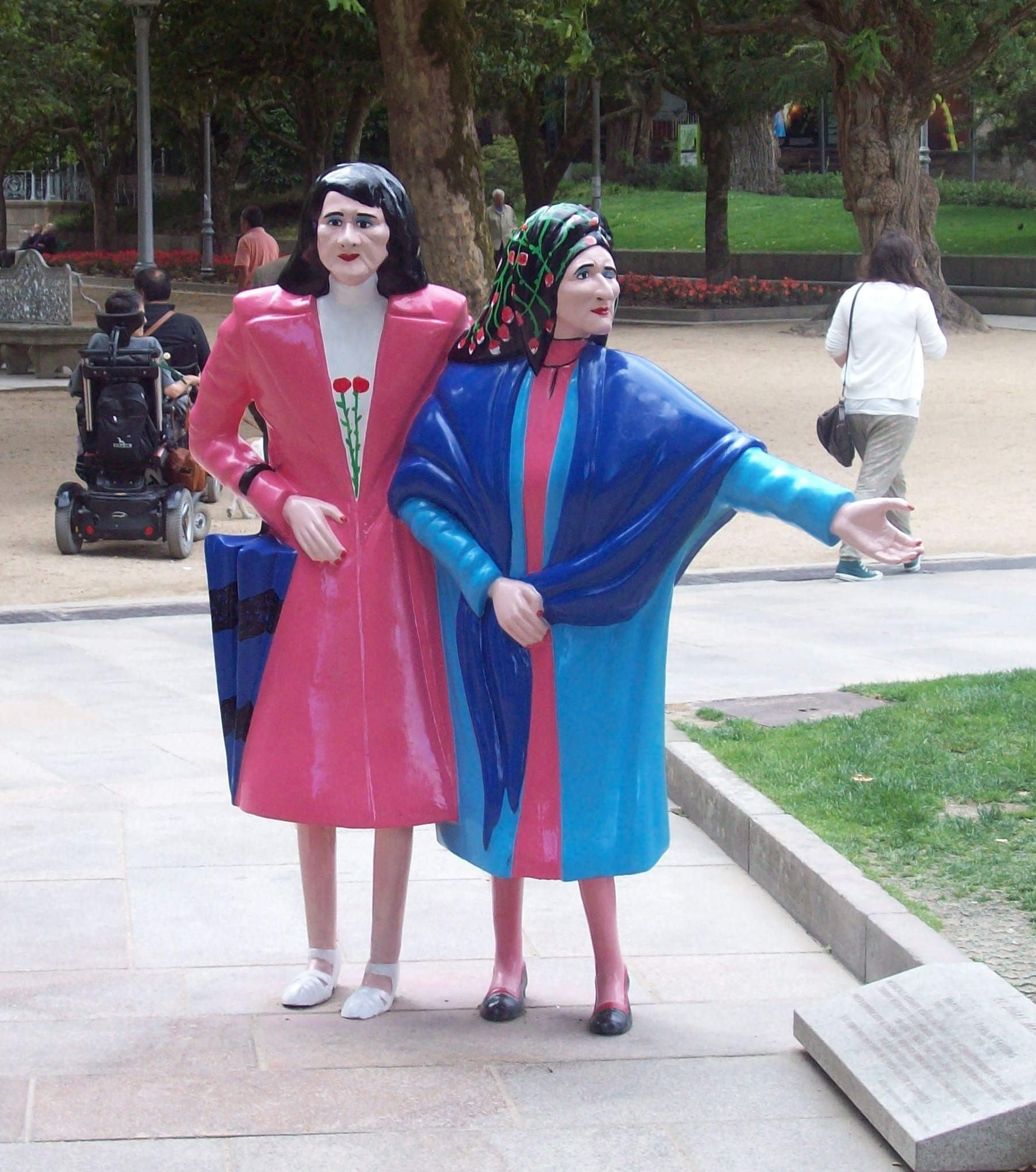
- Statue of the Two Marías in Santiago de Compostela
- Born: 4 January 1898 (Maruxa); 25 August 1914 (Coralia); Santiago de Compostela, Galicia, Spain
- Died: 13 May 1980 (aged 82) (Maruxa); 30 January 1983 (aged 68) (Coralia); Santiago de Compostela (Maruxa); A Coruña (Coralia)
- Other name: The Two Marías
- Known for: Daily walks in Santiago de Compostela

Maruxa Fandiño Ricart ([maˈɾuʃa]; 4 January 1898 – 13 May 1980) and Coralia Fandiño Ricart (25 August 1914 – 30 January 1983) were two Spanish sisters who became popular figures in the city of Santiago de Compostela during the years of the Francoist dictatorship.

Commonly known as the Two Marías (Galician: as dúas Marías), they were born into a large working-class family in Galicia that became affiliated with the growing anarcho-syndicalist movement of the 1920s and 1930s. After Spanish Nationalists took control of Galicia during the Spanish coup of July 1936, the Fandiño Ricart family fell under heavy social and institutional repression. A number of the brothers escaped capture and carried out clandestine actions against the dictatorship, which brought the sisters under suspicion. Their house was routinely raided by the Falangists and the secret police, who abused, tortured and allegedly raped the sisters.

After the arrest of their brothers and the death of their younger sister, along with their continued mistreatment by the Spanish authorities and society, Maruxa and Coralia fell into poverty and succumbed to mental disorder. From the 1950s to the late 1970s, they took a daily stroll through the old town of Santiago de Compostela, made up and dressed in eccentric costumes, while flirting with young university students. The sisters' eccentricities stood in direct contrast to the social repression of the dictatorship, making them among the most famous women in Galicia.

Maruxa and Coralia died during the Spanish transition to democracy, but became local icons in Santiago de Compostela due to their stories and character. They have been represented by a famous sculpture in Santiago's Alameda Park, the subject of a documentary about the mark they left on the city, and a source of analysis in Galician gender studies due to the violence committed against them.

== Biography ==
=== Early life and family ===
The Fandiño Ricart family consisted of the seamstress Consuelo Ricart and the shoemaker Arturo Fandiño, who together had thirteen children (eleven of whom survived early childhood). Maruxa was their fourth child and Coralia was their twelfth. The two had another sister called Sarita, as well as Rosaura, who was the youngest sister of the thirteen. The shoemaker's workshop was located at 32 Algalia de Arriba Street. They lived and worked in Espíritu Santo Street, in Santiago de Compostela.

=== Civil War and repression ===
In 1925, the anarchist Confederación Nacional del Trabajo (CNT) opened its regional headquarters in Santiago de Compostela. At the age of fifteen, their brother Manuel Fandiño Ricart - a painter by profession - became its secretary general. His two brothers Alfonso and Antonio also became militants in the anarchist movement. It is not clear whether the two Marías belonged to the anarchist movement, but it was known that their ideology was clearly left-wing. The journalist Borobó (Raimundo García Domínguez) maintained that they had been members of the CNT, like their brothers. During the years of the Second Spanish Republic, there was a climate of animation and hope in Santiago. Maruxa, Coralia, and Sarita frequently went on walks together, strolling through the streets of Santiago dressed in home-made clothes of brightly coloured fabrics. The Galician nationalist and republican students called them "Liberty, Equality and Fraternity", while right-wing students of the Spanish Confederation of Autonomous Rights (CEDA) called them "Faith, Hope and Charity".

With the Spanish coup of July 1936, repression followed the swift occupation of Galicia by the Nationalists. The brothers managed to escape. At first they had better luck than many other Republicans, who in the first days of the Spanish Civil War were found murdered in ditches. Manuel Fandiño remained in hiding for years. Antonio joined up with the anarcho-syndicalists and fled to Monte Pedroso. He was finally discovered, tortured and imprisoned for twenty years by the Francoist dictatorship. The third brother, Alfonso, fled shortly after the coup on a boat leaving the port of Muros. Some time later, Alfonso and Manuel reappeared in Galicia, where they resumed their anarcho-syndicalist activism clandestinely. Borobó claimed that the two Marías also carried out liaison work with trade unionists who had escaped from Galicia.

The repression against the Fandiño sisters began when the Falangists tried to use the family to find out their brothers' whereabouts. In the middle of the night, the secret police arrived at the Fandiño house, searched the house, stripped the sisters naked in public to humiliate them and took them up to the Monte Pedroso, where some sources reported they were tortured and raped. Eventually the escaped brothers were arrested and the immediate pressure on the Fandiños ceased. But the women of the house would have to live for decades amidst the threats and violence of the Falangists, who would arrive at their house at any time of the day and night to force feed them castor oil or shave their hair. Xosé Henrique Rivadulla Corcón, the author of a 2008 documentary on the sisters, said that this continued ill-treatment was the principal cause of the mental illness they both came to suffer.

=== Poverty and local fame ===
Throughout the years of the Francoist dictatorship, the three sisters Maruxa, Coralia, and Sarita lived on the Rúa del Medio, where Sarita died while she was still young. The Fandiño sisters were subjected to constant anti-communist and misogynist attacks. The two sisters fell into poverty after town residents stopped ordering from the sewing shop of the "anarchist family", for fear of linking themselves to the Fandiños. Beyond this fear, the people of Compostela generally felt sympathy for them, and when the war ended, the sisters - who were already living alone in their house - lived off the charity of the neighbours. Those who wanted to help them did not give them alms directly, but bought food, especially in the Carro import shop, located in the Plaza del Toural. The shop's owner, Tito Carro, gave it to them with the excuse that they were company "promotions" and not charity.

Over time, Maruxa and Coralia both succumbed to mental illness. Always emaciated and with no remaining teeth, they dressed up in light and colour, and plastered themselves in thick make-up consisting of rice powder, blush and lipstick. Every day, at two o'clock in the afternoon, marked by the Berenguela bell of the Santiago de Compostela Cathedral, the two went for a walk through the city. In the summer, they went along the street of Espiritu Santo to the promenade in the Toural. In the winter, they walked along the arcades of the rúa del Villar.

This daily walk took place at a time when there was most activity in the streets of the centre of Santiago, and when local students went to lunch. When some students mockingly flirted with them, the two sisters rejected any advances by saying in Spanish: "You already got yours". Their walk became a notable daily event because of the contrast with the atmosphere that prevailed in Spain during the Francoist dictatorship. The Two Marías quickly became the best known and most photographed women in Santiago de Compostela.

=== Final years and death ===
Maruxa died in Santiago de Compostela on 13 May 1980, aged 82. Coralia went to live with another sister in the port of A Coruña, a city to which she never adapted. She died two years later - on 30 January 1983, aged 68 - after asking many times which was the way back to Santiago. Until 2014, both were buried in separate and distant graves in Santiago de Compostela's Boisaca cemetery. Maruxa in grave number 991, with three of her siblings and her mother. Coralia, in grave 3196, with her father. In May 2014, due to the degradation of the graves, the Ateneo de Santiago association organised a popular collection that raised funds to rehabilitate the tomb, inter their mortal remains together as they wanted, and place a plaque of remembrance.

== Recognition ==
=== Sculpture ===
Over the years, the story of the two Fandiño sisters fell into obscurity, until in 1994, when César Lombera managed to convince the then mayor, Xerardo Estévez - after nine years of proposing to the council - that a sculpture be installed in their memory. The statue, made by César Lombera himself, consisted of a polychrome reproduction of the two women during their famous walks based on the most famous photo of the two sisters, with Maruxa on the right, arm outstretched, and Coralia holding an umbrella. The work is located in the Alameda, the place where it remains to this day.

=== Documentary ===
With the intention of preserving their memory, Xosé Henrique Rivadulla Corcón made the documentary Coralia e Maruxa, as irmás Fandiño. Narrated by the comedian and actor Xosé Luís Bernal, the documentary presents a series of interviews with residents of Compostela, who describe their relationship with the deceased sisters, and testimonies by the historians Encarna Otero Cepeda and Dionisio Pereira. It was released on 11 April 2008. The opinion of the author of the documentary is that for the "many people who felt suffocated by the regime and who did not rebel for fear of reprisals", the sisters played, possibly unknowingly, a fundamental role in "that cry for freedom" from the repression under Francoism.

=== Written works ===
Áurea Sánchez published the book Las Marías de Santiago de Compostela. Representation of female identity in the media; a research project in gender studies that she had carried out at the Jaume I University as part of her Master's degree. When analysing the news that appeared about the two Marías after their respective deaths, Sánchez pointed out that the women suffered "institutional and social ... gender violence", the context of which has "remained poorly explained to this day".
