= Ramon Unzueta =

Cuban–Spanish painter (1962–2012)

- Born: Ramón Unzueta Chávez; 14 July 1962; Havana, Cuba
- Died: 5 October 2012 (aged 50); Tenerife, Canary Islands, Spain
- Education: Escuela Nacional de Artes Aplicadas
- Known for: Painting, drawing, illustration
- Notable work: Urbanitas series; Coladores de Café series; Mujeres de Campo Florido series; Andaluzas y Meninas series; Dibujos infantiles series; Circus series
- Movement: Magic realism, contemporary art, Cuban art
- Awards: Miami-Dade County Key to the County; Miami-Dade County Distinguished Visitor
- Patrons: Zoé Valdés; Marta Permuy

Ramón Unzueta (July 14, 1962 – October 5, 2012) was a Cuban-Spanish painter most active in the United States, Spain, and France. In the United States he was a significant figure in the emergence of the Little Havana art market in Miami during the early 21st century. In his lifetime Unzueta received contemporary cultural recognition through public honors, media coverage, and high-profile international collaborations and commissions. Since his death, his work and career have been the subject of analysis through published literature, film, and posthumous exhibitions. Unzueta's work is featured in the permanent collections of the Frost Art Museum and the American Museum of the Cuban Diaspora.

== Early life ==
Ramón Unzueta Chávez was born in Havana, Cuba on July 14, 1962, to Ramón Unzueta (Sr.) and Enaida Chávez. He and his sister, Enaida, were raised in the coastal Centro Habana neighborhood of Havana. Their father was a Basque-Spaniard, which contributed significantly to their blended cultural upbringing within Cuba and maintained their cultural roots to Spain.

Unzueta showed creative inclination from an early age and began to paint at the age of eight drawing inspiration from films of the Golden Age of Hollywood, a theme that remained a major influence for the duration of his life and career. In 1972 at the age of ten Unzueta was gifted a sketch pad and tempera paint set by his father, which motivated him to further his early creative development.

Unzueta would formally study the arts in Cuba's Escuela Nacional de Artes Applicadas (National School of Applied Arts) in Havana. There he was taught and mentored by leading Cuban artist and professor Carmelo González (1920–1990) who was an early supporter of Unzueta's art. After graduating in 1982, Unzueta worked professionally as a graphic illustrator for various publications including higher education publishing houses, magazines, children's literature, as well as news publications. During this period through the early 1990s, he also experimented with art mediums, including oil, ink, watercolor, pencil, and collage. Pencil in particular would be an early prominent medium that he would be drawn to and later served as the foundation of his first exhibition of his art.

== Exile and art career ==
In 1992 Unzueta reached the age to where he was no longer required to remain in Cuba in the event of mandatory enlistment into the military and was permitted to leave the island.

Seeking to flee the conditions under the Castro regime, he then went into exile in his father's native Spain where he became a part of the international Cuban diaspora. Unzueta ultimately settled that year in Tenerife of the Canary Islands, where he would reside until his death. While in exile Unzueta began to shift from creating art for private use to an extensive exhibiting career as a professional artist alongside his successful career as an illustrator.

Unzueta held his first solo exhibition in April 1993 titled Ramón Unzueta Chavez: Dibujos 1987–1993, in the Galeria La Chatita of Santa Cruz de La Palma, Spain. The exhibition focused on his fine art drawings from his last years in Cuba as well as his first years in Spain.

In the turn of the millennium, Unzueta would participate and exhibit in increasingly international and high-profile cultural events. In 2000 he exhibited his art in the Madrid International Book Fair as a reflection of his established roots as a widely published illustrator dating back to his career in Cuba.

The following year marked a career turning point in which Unzueta exhibited in the United States for the first time. His first US solo exhibition, titled Crazy As A Coffee Pot, was held in Miami's Gainza Gallery and featured his Cafetera series, which had become a notable and recognizable series of his that found particular resonance with the extensive Cuban exile community in South Florida. To mark his arrival in Miami as an established international artist, Unzueta was awarded the Distinguished Visitor Certificate as well as the Key to the County of Miami-Dade County by the Miami-Dade County Board of County Commissioners.

In 2002, Unzueta exhibited in Miami, Paris, and Spain, including in the Miami Book Fair International. The following year Unzueta established his presence in Coconut Grove with a solo exhibition in the 2003 Coconut Grove Art Festival and another solo exhibition in The Mutiny Hotel, the area's most renown hotel. These exhibitions in South Florida raised his profile and laid the foundation to facilitate the 2004 opening of Unzueta Gallery in Miami's Little Havana Arts District. The gallery would be managed by his sister Enaida and would serve as his main base of representation in the United States for the next thirteen years. The 2004 grand opening of Unzueta Gallery was covered by Miami media as a significant moment in the development of Little Havana's Art District due to Unzueta's established international profile and recognitions. The gallery would become a significant contributor to its monthly Viernes Culturales (Cultural Fridays) festival and a hub of artists who would also contribute to its early development of the Little Havana Arts District. In addition to Unzueta, the gallery also featured work by painters Manolo Rodriguez, Josevelio Rodriguez, Esteban Alvarez-Buylla, and Carlos Manuel Galindo and was frequented by prominent collectors such as philologist and Noticiero Univision national editorial journalist Roberto Uria as well as art patron Marta Permuy.

In the years following the opening of Unzueta Gallery, Unzueta received several prominent commissions. In 2006 Unzueta received two public commissions: the first to create illustrations for the international literary magazine Limon Partido and the second to design the official event poster for Miami-Dade County's Hispanic Heritage Month. That same year he would also exhibit in the Las Palmas International Film Festival Invitational of Gran Canaria, Spain.

In 2007, Unzueta was commissioned to create the poster for the charity auction and exhibition Voices For Children in Miami. The poster featured his painting Niño Florecido (2007), and his works were featured alongside work other prominent Cuban artists including René Portocarrero, Amelia Peláez, and José Mijares.

In 2008, Unzueta was the subject of the documentary film Ramón Unzueta: Un peintre, un tableau, which was unveiled at Maison de l’Amerique Latine in Paris and supported by leading Cuban artist Gina Pellón. The film captured his creative process in making a single work dedicated to Spanish poet Federico García Lorca. The film's release resulted in Unzueta's exhibition in Malaga in the summer of 2008.

Following the release of the documentary, Unzueta had two solo exhibitions in Paris at the Ars Atelier gallery in 2009 and 2010. In 2010 Unzueta was the subject of a second documentary, RAMON UNZUETA: en Ars atelier, also by Vega.

=== Controversy ===
Alongside these developments, there were periods in Unzueta's career in which his work became the focus of controversy. In August 2005, Unzueta Gallery became the center of media attention as a result of a large-scale heist of his work. The thieves took advantage of the disorder following the recent impact of Hurricane Katrina and stole twelve original oil on canvas works by Unzueta from several of his prominent series.

Another source of controversy in his lifetime came by way of his erotic themed work. This was an ongoing series in Unzueta's career spanning both heteroerotic and homoerotic themes. While his erotic series was successful and well received in Europe, and particularly Paris, they were generally not embraced or given visibility in the United States by Miami critics and curators of the early 21st century and remain rarely displayed outside of Europe.

=== Illustration career ===
In addition to his fine arts career, Unzueta also illustrated books, magazine articles, and event posters in Cuba, Spain, and Miami.

Unzueta's Magic realism style led to his being commissioned to produce illustrations for several children's storybooks including: Perfume of Violets, Rabbits are Blue, When Crabs Sting, An Important Day, With my Grandma, and The Messenger Star.

In 1999 Unzueta illustrated the first book of short stories by renown Cuban writer, Zoé Valdés, Los Aretes de la Luna, published by Editorial Everest. In 2003 he illustrated its sequel, Luna en el cafetal, published by Gallimard in France, Spain, Italy, and China.

His close association with literary works would also result in his exhibiting his fine art in prominent literary venues such as the Madrid International Book Fair (2000), the Miami International Book Fair (2002), and Books & Books of Coral Gables (2003).

== Death and legacy ==
Ramón Unzueta died on October 5, 2012, at the age of fifty of a heart attack in his home on the island of Tenerife in the Canary Islands, Spain.

In his lifetime he was honored with the Distinguished Visitor Certificate from Miami Dade Mayor Alexander Penelas, as well as being presented with the Key to the County from Senator Gwen Margolis, then-Chairwoman of the Board of County Commissioners and former Florida Senate President.

He was the subject of two documentary films by filmmaker Ricardo Vega during his lifetime: Ramón Unzueta: Un peintre, un tableau (2008) and RAMON UNZUETA: en Ars Atelier (2010).

Unzueta's work has been exhibited alongside other leading Cuban artists such as René Portocarrero, Amelia Peláez, and José Mijares and included in several prominent collections of fine art. His patrons and collectors included Paris-based Cuban writer Zoé Valdés, art patron Marta Permuy, as well as the Flores Carbonell Fine Art Collection. He was a key figure in Permuy's late-career art activities in the Permuy House, a designated Coral Gables landmark for its cultural significance.

His art career has been covered by various media outlets including El Nuevo Herald, Diario Las Americas, Miami New Times, and Artburst. In 2014, two years following his death, Unzueta was the subject of the magazine publication Unzueta – Essential.

In 2016, Unzueta: Ramón Unzueta (1962–2012), the artist's 328-page official monograph, was published. A presentation and exhibition of Unzueta's art was held on December 16 at Unzueta Gallery. The book presentation was covered by El Nuevo Herald and the monograph has subsequently been added to the permanent collection of the University of Miami’s Cuban Heritage Collection archives due to Unzueta's significance within the Cuban diaspora. That same year, Valdés dedicated her novel The Weeping Woman to Unzueta's memory.

In 2017 His work was included in Artists For Rights, an exhibition of Cuban art in support of human rights in Cuba.

In 2021 he was the subject of the filmed special Ramón Unzueta: La Vida y el Arte produced by Zoé Valdes. The following year Valdes paid tribute to Unzueta on her website to mark the 10th anniversary of his death.

In 2023, Unzueta's work was the subject of a career-spanning solo exhibition in the American Museum of the Cuban Diaspora. The exhibition, titled Ramón Unzueta: From Island to Island, opened on May 20 to mark Cuban Independence Day. The exhibition was positively received by critics and media coverage, including Diario Las Americas, Martí Noticias, and Artburst Miami. The retrospective was part of the museum’s high profile series of retrospectives of prominent Cuban artists, including Baruj Salinas and Rafael Soriano. Following the retrospective, the American Museum of the Cuban Diaspora acquired a work of Unzueta from the Unzueta Estate to add to the museum's permanent collection. In December 2023, a work from Unzueta’s Marineros (Sailors) series was donated to the permanent collection of the Frost Art Museum in memory of Marta Permuy by her grandson, curator Antonio Permuy.

That same year, The Vasari Project added Unzueta to the archives of its artist files to compile records for future scholarship on Unzueta's career. The Vasari Project is overseen by the Miami-Dade Public Library System to document artistically significant records pertaining to the Miami-Dade County region from the Post-World War II era through to the present.

== Style and analysis ==
Ramon Unzueta's work is considered Magic realism, though he also incorporates elements of Surrealism. Through his career he worked in the mediums of watercolor, nib, pencil, pastel, ink, oil, and collage on paper as well as canvas.

His style is expressive and emotional yet whimsical and aloof. Unzueta's most frequent subjects and themes included bold portraits of women (as in his Mujeres de Campo Florido and Andaluzas y Meninas series), cityscapes and metropolitan scenes (as in his Urbanitas series), interiors, and Cuban coffee makers (as in his Coladores de Café series).

Additionally, Unzueta produced a long-running Dibujos infantiles series – a cartoon-like style of children's drawings which he frequently employed when executing commissions to illustrate children's books, as well as a surrealistic circus scenes of tents and harlequins.

Another significant series of work in Unzueta's oeuvre were his spiritual and mythological series of paintings that included Orpheus, elves, the Yoruba Orishas, as well as Catholic saints, angels, and biblical scenes.

Unzueta frequently drew inspiration for his art from the Golden Age of Hollywood, such as Bette Davis, historical art movements such as Surrealism, Expressionism, and the Baroque, as well has his cultural heritage in Cuba and Spain. His sister and representative Enaida was also a frequent subject and muse of his work, and her likeness was frequently incorporated into his female character studies and portraits. Her influence on his art as well as her role as his primary art representative in the United States has been compared to the creative partnership between siblings Theo and Vincent van Gogh.

== Select exhibitions ==
- 1993 – First career solo exhibition: Ramón Unzueta Chavez. Dibujos 1987–1993, Galeria La Chatita, Santa Cruz de la Palma, Spain.
- 2000 — Exhibits in the Madrid International Book Fair, Madrid, Spain.
- 2001 — First solo exhibition in the United States: Crazy As A Coffee Pot, Agustín Gaínza Gallery, Miami, FL.
- 2002 — Children's Books, Miami Book Fair International, Miami, FL.
- 2002 — In Touch With Children, Miami Children's Hospital Foundation, Miami, FL.
- 2002 — Recent Works, Galerie Du Musée, Le Marais, Paris, France.
- 2002 — Entre Islas, solo exhibition, Fifth Hemisferic Sister Cities Forum, Santa Cruz de Tenerife, Spain.
- 2003 — Paintings, Solo exhibition, Coconut Grove Art Festival, Miami, FL.
- 2003 — Todo Sobre Mujeres, solo exhibition, The Mutiny Hotel Coconut Grove, Miami, FL.
- 2003 — Dibujos 1987–1993, Casino San Miguel de Abona, Santa Cruz de Tenerife, Spain.
- 2003 — Dibujos Infantiles, solo exhibition, Books & Books, Coral Gables, FL.
- 2004 — Mail Book 555, Voices For Children Foundation, Miami Beach, FL.
- 2004 — Grand opening exhibition: Lobas De Mar, Unzueta Gallery, Miami, FL. Unzueta Gallery, Little Havana Arts District.
- 2005 — Les Nus des Eaux, solo exhibition, Les Mots á la Bouche, Paris, France.
- 2005 — Los Hombres de Unzueta, solo exhibition, Unzueta Gallery, Miami, FL.
- 2006 — Las Palmas International Film Festival Invitational, Gran Canaria, Spain.
- 2007 — Voices For Children Foundation Auction, Miami, FL.
- 2007 — Payasos y Bufones, solo exhibition, Unzueta Gallery, Miami, FL.
- 2007 — Trabajos recientes, solo exhibition, Unzueta Gallery, Miami, FL.
- 2007 — Spanish Soul, solo exhibition, Unzueta Gallery, Miami, FL.
- 2008 — Group exhibition, Sillas series, Temple Beth-El, St. Petersburg, FL.
- 2008 — Urbanitas, solo exhibition, Unzueta Gallery.
- 2009 — Pientres Cubains, Ars Atlier, Paris, France.
- 2010 — À l’ombre de jeunes filles en fleurs, solo exhibition, Ars Atelier, Paris, France.
- 2010 — Mujeres de Campo Florido, solo exhibition, Unzueta Gallery, Miami, FL.
- 2016–Presentation of Unzueta: Ramón Unzueta (1962–2012) and retrospective exhibition, Unzueta Gallery, Miami, FL
- 2023 — Ramón Unzueta: From Island to Island, career- retrospective exhibition, the American Museum of the Cuban Diaspora, Miami, FL.
