= Cuban Sign Language =

Deaf sign language of Cuba

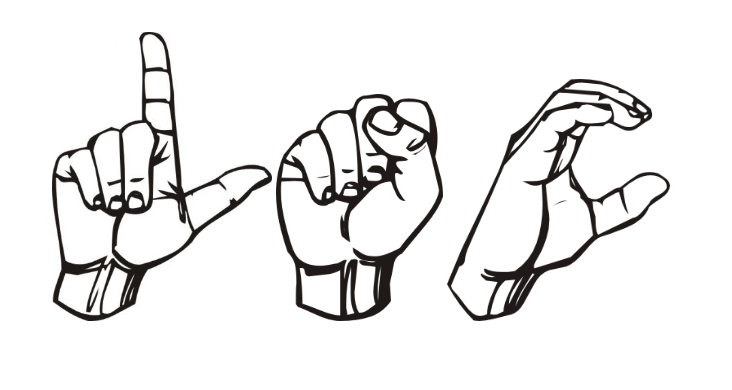
- Fingerspelling of LSC
- Native to: Cuba
- Signers: 34,000 (2021)
- Language family: (unclassified)

Language codes
- ISO 639-3: csf
- Glottolog: cuba1235

LSC Dactilema

Cuban Sign Language, (Spanish: Lengua de señas cubana, LSC) is the language used by the Deaf community in Cuba. There are approximately 19,000 users of the language. Cuban Sign Language is an important part of the culture of the Deaf community in Cuba.

== History ==
In the early 1900s, in response to oralist teachings in the deaf schools in Cuba, the old manual alphabet ("alfabeto manual Antiguo") started to become common in these schools, until it wasn't accepted later on as it interfered with oralist teachings. In the 1980s, this manual alphabet started being used in deaf schools. The manual alphabet was used to teach deaf children to read and write in Spanish and was articulated with both hands and the face. This manual alphabet is no longer used for this reason, and lost its popularity, but can still be found in some LSC signs. In the 1990s, the Cuban Sign Language was introduced and accepted into deaf schools. Nowadays, the current manual alphabet is called the Dactilema. It is used in LSC to fingerspell concepts that do not have signs in LSC and for specific words, like dates and uncommon words.

== Linguistics ==
There are four distinctive features in Cuban Sign Language. These include the location, orientation, movement, and configuration of the hands. These components may not have meaning on their own, but together they create signs. To create a sign, the dominant hand moves to a particular location makes a certain handshape has an orientation, and from there makes a specific movement. All of those components working together create distinct signs and meanings.

There is a distinct way movement, which can be internal or external, denotes a certain meaning in Cuban Sign Language. For example, the way movement is expressed can correspond to the way the hands move or act during the action, such as in the signs for "eat", "drive", and "row".

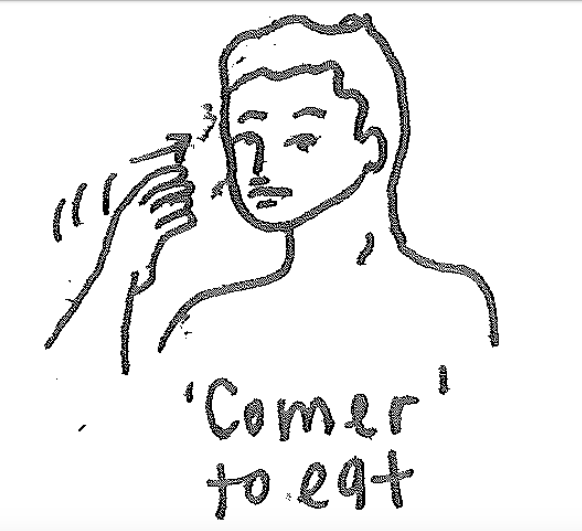
"To eat" in LSC

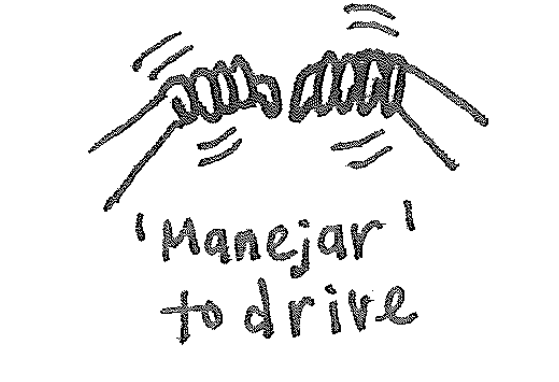
"To drive" in LSC

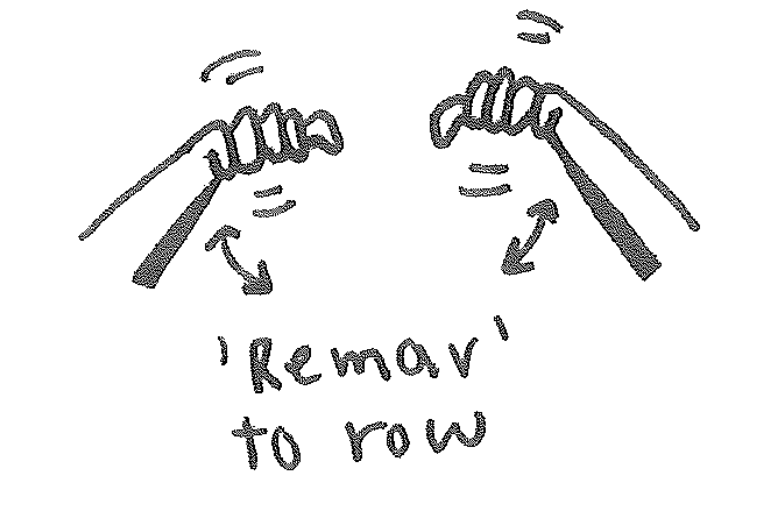
"To row" in LSC

The internal movement of extension of all fingers in a sign will denote signs, such as "light", "day", and "clarity". The flexion of all fingers touching indicate signs, such as "darkness", "night", and "forget".

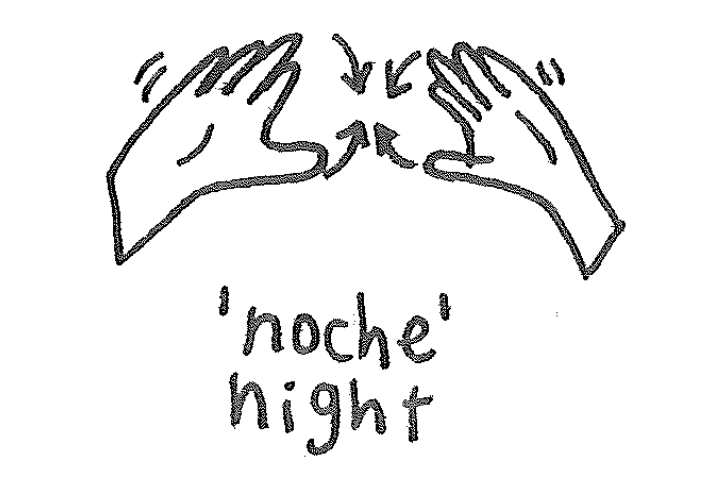
"Night" in LSC

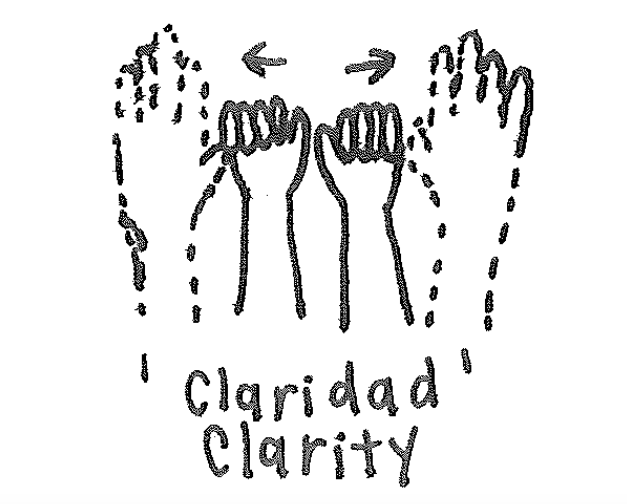
"Clarity" in LSC

How the personal pronouns in Cuban Sign Language are expressed is through the movement and the position of the people talked about. For example, the sign for "inform" carries different grammatical morphemes in terms of the direction of the movement towards or away from people talked about. In the phrase, "I inform you", the sign for "inform", moves from closer to the signer's body, and then moves outwards toward the person talking to the signer.

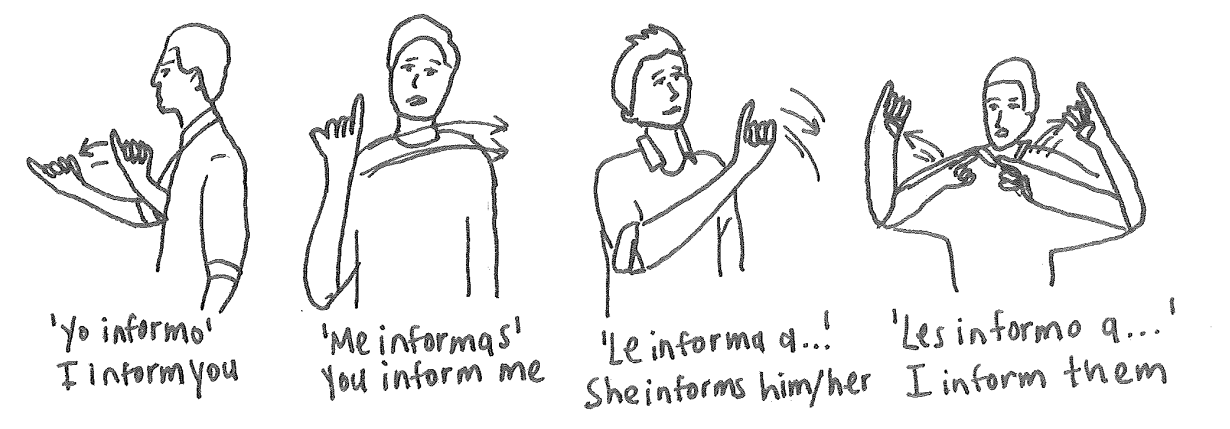
Various forms of using the verb "to inform" in LSC

To show tense, LSC makes use of movement and space. To indicate present tense, the movements are closer to the signer's front side of their body, for example in the signs for "today" and "now". To indicate something in the past tense, the movement will occur towards the back of the signer's body. Examples of signs that use this type of movement are "yesterday", "a long time ago", and "before". To show something that will happen in the future, the space in front of the signer is used, like in "tomorrow" and "later".

Signs at some particular locations have certain meanings. For example, signs realized in the neck area, signify bodily functions, such as "thirst", "swallow", and "vomit", or different articles of clothing worn at the neck, such as "scarf", and "necklace".

== See also ==
- Deafness in Cuba
