= Ginny Aiken =

American writer

Ginny Aiken (born 8 June 1955) is an author of inspirational fiction as well as mystery novels. Ginny was born in Havana, Cuba, and grew up in Valencia, Spain, and Caracas, Venezuela.

The former newspaper reporter discovered books early on and wrote her first novel at age fifteen. That effort was followed years later by award-winning and best-selling titles in the secular and Christian markets. Aiken holds certification in French literature and culture from the Nancy-Université, France, as well as a B.A. from Allegheny College in Pennsylvania. She lives in South-Central Pennsylvania.

== Books ==
=== Bellamy's Blossoms ===
Published by Tyndale

1. Magnolia, 2000
2. Lark, 2000
3. Camellia, 2001

=== Silver Hills Trilogy ===
Published by Revell

1. Light of My Heart, 2004
2. Song of My Soul, 2004
3. Spring of My Love, 2005

=== Deadly Decor Mysteries ===
Published by Revell

1. Design On a Crime, 2005
2. Decorating Schemes, 2006
3. Interior Motives, 2006

=== Shop-Til-U-Drop ===
Published by Revell

1. Priced to Move, 2007
2. A Steal of a Deal, 2008
3. A Cut Above, 2008
