= Emma Romeu =

Cuban environmental journalist

- Occupations: Writer; geographer

Emma Romeu is a Cuban writer and geographer who is an environmental journalist. She has written for the Spanish edition of National Geographic Magazine and published books.

== Life ==
Romeu was born in Havana, where she subsequently pursued and earned her academic degree.

She published articles in National Geographic Magazine in 2000 to 2003.

In 2004 she published a short book The Flamingo's Legs. She has written other books for children.
