= Sandra Abd'Allah-Álvarez Ramírez =

Cuban writer and activist

- Occupations: Writer; Editor; Essayist
- Years active: 2006–present
- Known for: Negra Cubana Tenia que ser; Directorio de Afrocubanas

Sandra Abd'Allah-Álvarez Ramírez is a Cuban writer, editor, and essayist who is active in both Cuba and Germany as an activist for the rights of women, people of African descent and particularly Afro-Cubans, and LGBT people. Her activism is particularly focused on improving the representation of Afrocubanas, Cuban women of African descent.

== Early life and education ==
Sandra Abd'Allah-Álvarez Ramírez graduated from the University of Havana in 1996 with a degree in psychology.

She then attended the Instituto Internacional de Periodismo José Martí, earning a diploma in gender studies and communication, and in 2008 she earned a master's degree in gender studies at the José Martí International Institute of Journalism. From her master's thesis she developed the essay Relectura de la obra cinematográfica de Sara Gómez desde la teoría feminista, which received an honorable mention in the essay contest at the Félix Varela Center in Havana.

== Career ==
For 10 years, Álvarez was the editor of the site Cubaliteraria, operated by the Cuban Book Institute.

In 2006, she founded the blog Negra Cubana Tenía que ser. ("It had to be a Black Cuban woman"). The blog's name is a play on "negra(o) tenía que ser", a Cuban saying referring to the Afro-Cuban community's experience of racism.

The stated purpose of the blog is to correct for media bias in which Afro-Cubans and particularly Afrocubanas are underrepresented in Cuban media, and to challenge racism, sexism, and homophobia in Cuban media. The blog includes substantial media criticism, for example publishing pieces in response to advertisements that employ objectification. The blog also focuses on the representation of LGBT Cubans. Negra Cubana Tenía que ser was named in the 2014 BOB Awards in the Best of Online Activism category.

Álvarez is also the founder and manager of the Directorio de Afrocubanas (Afrocubana Directory), which publishes short biographies of Afrocubanas who have played a significant role in Cuban history, society, or culture. The directory also functions as a news outlet or encyclopedia, sometimes posting updates on specific well-known Afrocubana women.

In 2015, she co-founded the magazine Azúcar & Kalt, which is the first Spanish-language magazine in Hannover. She has worked extensively as a journalist, writing regularly for several print and online media outlets.
