= Pedro Juan Gutiérrez =

Cuban novelist

- Born: January 27, 1950 (age 76); Matanzas, Cuba
- Writing career
- Notable works: Trilogia sucia de La Habana, Lulú le dégagé
- Literary movement: Dirty realism - Obscene Hyperrealism

Pedro Juan Gutiérrez (born 27 January 1950, in Matanzas, Cuba) is a Cuban novelist.

He grew up in Pinar del Río and began to work selling ice cream and newspapers when he was 11 years old. He was a soldier, swimming and kayak instructor, agricultural worker, technician in construction, technical designer, radio speaker, and journalist for 26 years. He is a painter, sculptor and author of several poetry books.

He came to Centro Habana, a dilapidated part of the capital, when he was 37 and was astonished by the level of violence but also by the energy of the people who lived there.

He is the author of Dirty Havana Trilogy, King of Havana, Tropical Animal (winner of Spain's Alfonso Garcia Ramos Prize in 2000), The Insatiable Spiderman, Dog Meat (winner of Italy's Narrativa Sur del Mundo Prize), Snake's Nest (winner of the Prix des Amériques Insulaires et de la Guyane in 2008), Our GG in Havana, and the short stories of Melancholy of Lions. Dirty Havana Trilogy, Tropical Animal and The Insatiable Spiderman have been translated to English. Since 1994, he has written 10 prose books and five books of poetry. In 2007, he published Corazón Mestizo, a Cuban travel book.

== Writings ==
Called a master of "Cuban dirty realism," like Zoé Valdés and Fernando Velázquez Medina, he tells the stories of the Cuban underclass in a direct, visceral style. His books describe contemporary Cuba from his semiautobiographical perspective as a disillusioned journalist.

His books are typically gritty, tragicomic accounts of himself and his countrymen hustling for money, searching for pleasure and happiness, and struggling in desperate situations. He makes heavy use of irony. His stories illustrate the difficulty of achieving self-sufficiency and contentment in a dysfunctional and poverty-stricken society with a paternalistic government.

His narrative voice is skeptical, intellectual, humorous, crass, sardonic, and bluntly frank. His literary persona is chiefly concerned with escaping poverty. However, efforts are rarely successful, and much of his time is spent escaping misery through sex and his preferred vices of rum, cigars and marijuana.

Dirty Havana Trilogy (Trilogía sucia de La Habana) (1998) is his best known work. It is set during the economic depression in Cuba in the early to mid-1990s. Its first two parts, "Anclado en la tierra de nadie" ("Anchored in No-man's Land") and "Nada que hacer" ("Nothing to Do"), follow the picaresque adventures of a protagonist, who, like the author, is a one-time journalist called Pedro Juan. He struggles with loneliness, claustrophobia and alcoholism. The third part, "Sabor a mí" ("Essence of Me"), is a collection of short stories in which Pedro Juan appears only intermittently.

Despite his grim depiction of Cuban life, his writing stresses his overriding love for Cuban culture. He frequently praises Cuban music, resourcefulness, and joie de vivre. He writes scornfully of people who avoid risk and self-expression in exchange for smothering safety and boredom-inducing banality.

== Pedro Juan Gutiérrez and the Obscene Hyperrealism ==
The Italian researcher Gino Tramontana (Ph.D. in Latin-American Literature, Musician and Writer) believes that the poetics of Pedro Juan Gutiérrez should be considered not so clearly comparable to that of Charles Bukowski and entirely distant from the so-called dirty realism, believing that the most adequate definition is that of obscene hyperrealism. This theory was accepted and disseminated through a Doctoral thesis for the Universidad Complutense (Madrid), and arousing interest from international scientific journals such as Cultura Latinoamericana. Furthermore, to support this theory, in 2017 a conference entitled ¿Realismo sucio o hiperrealismo obsceno? was held at the Faculty of Letters of the Universidad Complutense en Madrid during which Gino Tramontana interviewed Pedro Juan Gutiérrez, pursuing the thesis that sees the Cuban author as completely distant from the literary movement defined as dirty realism.

== Works ==
=== Prose Books ===
==== Centro Havana cycle ====
- Dirty Havana Trilogy (Trilogía sucia de La Habana, 1998)
- The King of Havana (El Rey de La Habana, 1999)
- Tropical Animal (Animal tropical, 2000)
- The Insatiable Spiderman (El insaciable hombre araña, 2002)
- Dog Meat (Carne de perro, 2003)

==== Other books ====
- The Snake's Nest (El nido de la serpiente: Memorias del hijo del heladero, 2003)
- Our GG in Havana (Nuestro GG en La Habana, 2005)
- Melancholy of Lions (Melancolía de los leones, 2002)
- Fabian and the Chaos (Fabian y el caos, 2016)
- Cuentos de La Habana Vieja (1997)
- Polizón a bordo (1990)
- Diálogo con mi sombra: Sobre el oficio de escritor (2013)
- Viejo Loco.cuentos. (2014)
- Estoico y frugal. (2019)

=== Poetry ===
- La realidad rugiendo (1987)
- Poesía (1988)
- Espléndidos peces plateados (1996)
- Fuego contra los herejes (1998)
- Non aver paura Lulù (Lulú la perdida y otros poemas de John Snake, 2006)
- Yo y una lujuriosa negra vieja (2006)
- Arrastrando hojas secas hacia la oscuridad (2012)
- La serpiente roja (2012)
- El último misterio de John Snake (2013)
- El sendero de las fieras (Yo y una lujuriosa negra vieja) 2014
- La línea oscura. Poesía escogida (2015)
- Mediciones y sondeos
