= Madrid Book Fair =

Book fair

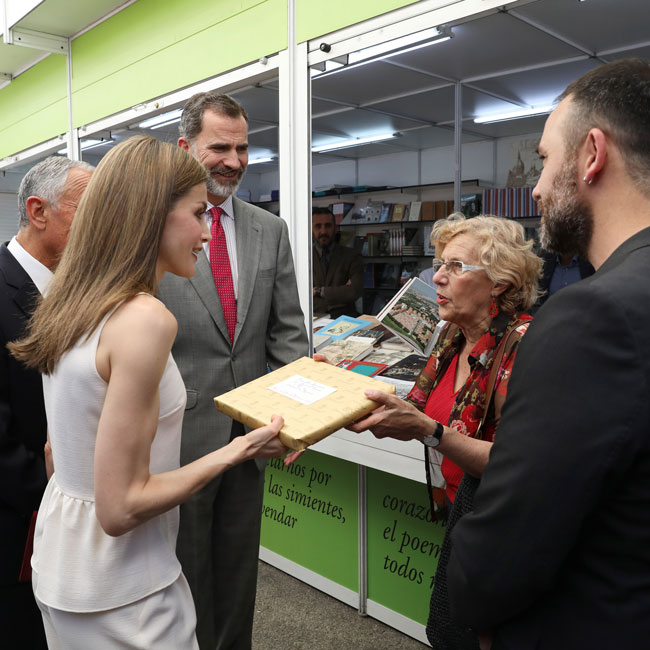
The King and Queen of Spain at the Madrid Book Fair in 2017, talking with Manuela Carmena, Mayor of Madrid.

The Madrid Book Fair (Spanish: Feria del Libro de Madrid) is an annual event held in the Buen Retiro Park in Madrid. It is not to be confused with the trade fair LIBER, which alternates its venues between Barcelona and Madrid.

The Madrid Book Fair is international in scope. Although it features mainly books from Spanish-speaking countries, the event promotes the literature of a guest country, which may speak another language. In 2018 the guest country was Romania; in 2019 it was the Dominican Republic.

The Book Fair does not feature e-books. Also, the Fair has expressed scepticism that there is scope for Amazon to have a stall at the event.

== History ==
The Fair began in 1933. It ceased for a few years because of the Spanish Civil War.

The event scheduled for 2020 was suspended because of the COVID-19 pandemic in Spain. The Fair resumed in September 2021.
