= Mirta Rodríguez Calderón =

Cuban journalist

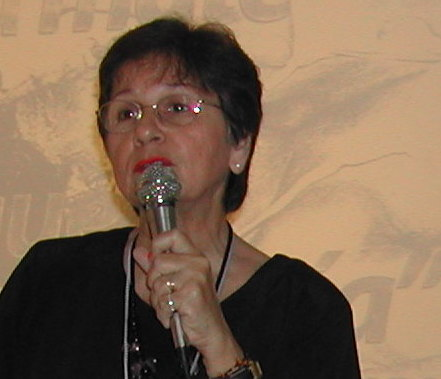
- Occupation: Journalist

Mirta Rodríguez Calderón is Cuban journalist based in Santo Domingo, Dominican Republic. She is known for her advocacy of feminist journalism and gender equality in media. She co-founded the International Network of Journalists With a Gender Perspective in 2005, and is a promoter of alliances among journalists in Ecuador, the Dominican Republic, and Cuba, with the aim of including gender-based approaches in social communication.

== Career ==
Educated in Havana, Mirta Rodríguez Calderón first moved to Mexico, and in the late 1990s she moved to the Dominican Republic as a correspondent for Servicio de Noticias de la Mujer de Latinoamérica y el Caribe (SEMlac).

She was a clandestine operative against the dictatorships of Gerardo Machado and Fulgencio Batista with the Martí Women's Civic Front, for which she received recognition from the José Martí Cultural Society of Havana. She later wrote:

I remember that on 13 March, during the Attack on the (Presidential) Palace, I had to give a music class. [...] There was a moment, around 1957 itself, when the Club Artístico Normalista became a facade because, for example, we held a beautiful activity with Carilda Oliver Labra, the Matanzas poet, and we told people to go and what would be raised there would be for the Movement. And so we did. We were honest with Carilda and we told her; she took it very well and then she maintained a certain relationship with us. [...] However, we were a very small group, who converged through poetic and intellectual interests, until later the insurrectional struggle began and the rest took over. [...] While we had literary interests, political interests were very strong.

In Cuba, she was co-founder of the Association of Women Communicators (MAGIN), and taught communications at the Pontifical Catholic University of Santo Domingo.

A pioneer in incorporating aspects of gender studies into the training of journalists, together with Sara Lovera of CIMAC, she was a co-founder of the International Network of Journalists With a Gender Perspective (RIPVG), established in Morelia in 2005. She was editor of the Journal of Communication and A Primera Plana, a newspaper dedicated to promoting equality between men and women in the media.

She is especially known for her coverage of the 2010 Haiti earthquake, which won the 2011 Mary Fran Myers Award. She has worked with the Women and Health Collective, and with CEMUJER, a grassroots women's organization in Santo Domingo.

== Awards and recognition ==
- 2011 May Fran Myers Award for her journalistic work on gender and natural disasters
- Recognition of the José Martí Cultural Society of Havana

== Publications ==
- Tania, the Unforgettable Guerrilla (1971), cowritten with Marta Rojas, ISBN 9780394473376
- Hablar sobre el hablar (1985), Editorial de Ciencias Sociales
- Dígame usted! (1989), Editorial Pablo de la Torriente
- Semillas de fuego: compilación sobre la lucha clandestina en la capital, Volume 1 (1989), collective work

=== Articles ===
- "No nos han dejado salir de las guardarrayas" (2001)
- "Belén do Pará: La Convención que lo dijo casi todo y ha logrado poco" (2012), news and reports for SEMlac
- "Dominicana: Ciudadanía plena y democracia, objetivos de mujeres latinoamericanas" (2012), news and reports for SEMlac
- "Dominicana: Diputadas concertan agendas de género para próximo gobierno" (2012), news and reports for SEMlac
- "Dominicana: Elegirá la población nuevo presidente en comicios conflictivos" (2012)
- "Dominicana: Protestas en la calle por mujeres agredidas y asesinadas" (2012), news and reports for SEMlac
- "Julieta Paredes: Un feminismo que cree en las utopías y la comunidad" (2012)
- "República Dominicana: Aluvión de protestas y manifestaciones" (2012)
- "República Dominicana: Revisión de acuerdos de El Cairo: ¿más de lo mismo?" (2012)
- "Dominicana: Otra niña embarazada puede morir" (2013)
- "Dominicana: Romper cadenas bailando para rechazar la violencia" (2013), news and reports for SEMlac
- "Dominicanas: Mujeres vuelven a enfrentarse al Congreso por Código Penal" (2013)
- "República Dominicana: Matrimonio homosexual se abre paso" (2013)
