= Ana Cairo Ballester =

Cuban writer, researcher and professor (1949–2019)

Ana Andrea Cairo Ballester (November 10, 1949 – April 3, 2019) was a Cuban writer, researcher and professor of literature and philology.

== Early life and education ==
Ana Cairo Ballester was born in Havana in 1949. Her father was a mechanic, and her mother was a housewife. Her early years were marked by the massive upheaval of the Cuban Revolution. As a young teenager in 1962, she traveled to Baracoa to work harvesting coffee, but her work was interrupted by the Cuban Missile Crisis. In 1964, she began high school at the newly founded Raúl Cepero Bonilla Special Pre-University Institute, where she first became interested in the humanities. In 1967 she enrolled at the University of Havana, where she received a doctorate in philology in 1985.

== Career ==
Cairo was a longtime professor in the Faculty of Arts and Letters at the University of Havana, where she began teaching in 1973 after completing her undergraduate studies. She led the department's instruction on Cuban literature and taught multiple subjects, including an annual seminar on Jose Martí. She was known as a deeply knowledgeable professor; intimidating despite her casual uniform; an old-school scholar who never used a typewriter, much less a computer. As her colleague Pedro Pablo Rodríguez wrote:

"With professorial wisdom—and not without a certain malice, I would say—Ana would open a book and ask unimaginable exam questions from it: calling on students to recount specific episodes from the fictional texts, attitudes of the characters, the human problems demonstrated in the stories. ... In truth, Ana taught her students how to read and how to think."

She was a prominent figure in the Cuban literary scene, serving as a member of the Cuban Academy of History, on the advisory board of the Fundación Alejo Carpentier, and on the board of directors of the Fundación Fernando Ortiz. She was also a member of the Caribbean Studies Association and the Association of Historians of Latin America and the Caribbean, and she frequently traveled abroad to teach on Cuban literature and culture in such countries as Mexico, Panama, France, and Spain. She received the National Prize for Social Sciences and Humanities in 2015.

In 1975, Cairo received the July 26 Prize for the essay that would become her first book, El movimiento de Veteranos y Patriotas. She went on to publish some 20 books, including several anthologies, as well as numerous essays in both Cuban and international periodicals. She created the weekly Radio Havana Cuba show Contrapunteo and served on the editorial boards of various Cuban magazines, including Temas, Universidad de La Habana, Debates Americanos, and Revista de la Biblioteca Nacional José Martí.

== Death and legacy ==
Cairo died in 2019 in Havana, at age 69.

In 2020, the 29th annual Cuban International Book Fair in Havana was dedicated in her honor.

== Personal life ==
Cairo had one son, Carlos Enrique del Toro Cairo.

== Selected works ==
- El movimiento de Veteranos y Patriotas (1976)
- El Grupo Minorista (1978)
- Historia de La Universidad de la Habana (co-authored, 1983)
- Teatro cubano (1987)
- La Revolución del 30 en la narrativa y el testimonio cubanos (1993)
- 20 de mayo, ¿fecha gloriosa? (2002)
- Mella, 100 años (2003)
- Heredia: entre cubanos y españoles (2003)
- Bembé para cimarrones (2005)
- José Martí y la novela de la cultura cubana (2014)
- Letras. Cultura en Cuba (series editor)
