= Dulce María Borrero =

Cuban poet and essayist

Dulce María Borrero de Luján
- Born: 1883; Cuba
- Died: 1945 (aged 61–62)
- Occupations: Poet, essayist
- Relatives: Juana Borrero (sister)

Dulce María Borrero de Luján (1883–1945) was a Cuban poet and essayist, "one of the leading feminists of her day". María Collado Romero, writing in 1929, called her "the most outstanding female figure in the Cuban intellectual world [...] her poetry surpasses that of all contemporary Cuban women poets".

== Life ==
Dulce María Borrero was born 1883 in Cuba, the daughter of Esteban Borrero Echeverría. Her older sister was the poet Juana Borrero. Forced into exile at the outset of the Cuban War of Independence, the family emigrated to Key West in Florida in 1896. Dulce María returned to Cuba after the war had ended.

While in Florida, Dulce María started publishing her poetry in Revista de Cayo Hueso. A prominent member of the young modernista poets, she was one of four women poets included in the 1904 anthology Arpas Cubanas. Her poem 'Tierra propria' [Our own land] represented Cuba as the mother-country, a site of maternal protection and nurturance. A sonnet 'Los Ríos' [The Rivers] in Horas de me vida (1912) imagined the rivers as feminine, their femininity combining maternal and erotic elements.

A feminist, Dulce María testified to Congress in support of the 1918 Divorce Bill. As a journalist in the 1920s she argued for the need to protect women in the workplace. At the second National Women's Congress in 1925, a resolution by Ofelia Domínguez Navarro to ensure equal rights for illegitimate children (constituting 23% of the 1919 population) caused a split between radical and conservative feminists. After delegates refused to support the resolution, Dulce María, Domínguez Navarro, Mariblanca Sabas Alomá and Ofelia Rodríguez Acosta walked out of the conference.

In 1935 she became Director of Culture in the Cuban Ministry of Education.

== Works ==
- Horas de me vida [Hours of my life], 1912.
- El matrimonio en Cuba [Matrimony in Cuba]. 1914.
- 'La mujer, responsible de la degeneración progresiva del alma cubana' [Woman, responsible for the progressive degeneration of the Cuban soul], Revista Bimestre Cubana, Vol. 18, No. 2 (March-April 1923), pp.110-119.
