= Cecilia Samartin =

Cuban-American writer and psychologist

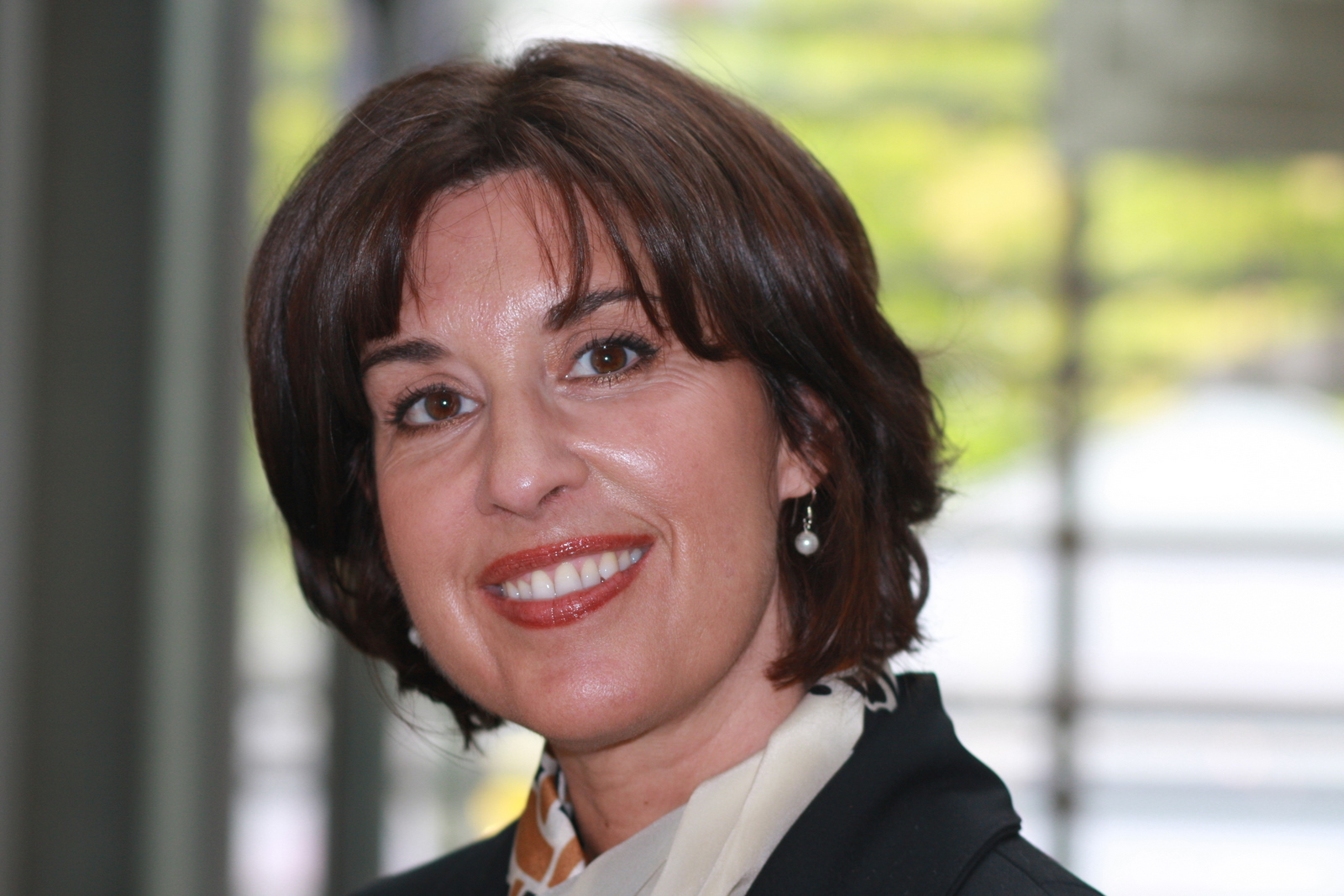
Cecilia Samartin in Stavanger kulturhus 2009

Cecilia Samartin (born 1961 in Havana, Cuba) is a Cuban-American writer and psychologist. She studied psychology at UCLA and marriage and family therapy at Santa Clara University.

For several years she has been working with people who have immigrated to the United States from countries in Latin America.

Samartin has also been translated into Dutch, Finnish, German, French, Norwegian, Danish, and Swedish.

Samartin had a book tour in Norway in 2009; she has topped the bestseller list there for over two years.

She lives in San Gabriel, California, with her British-born husband.

== Bibliography ==
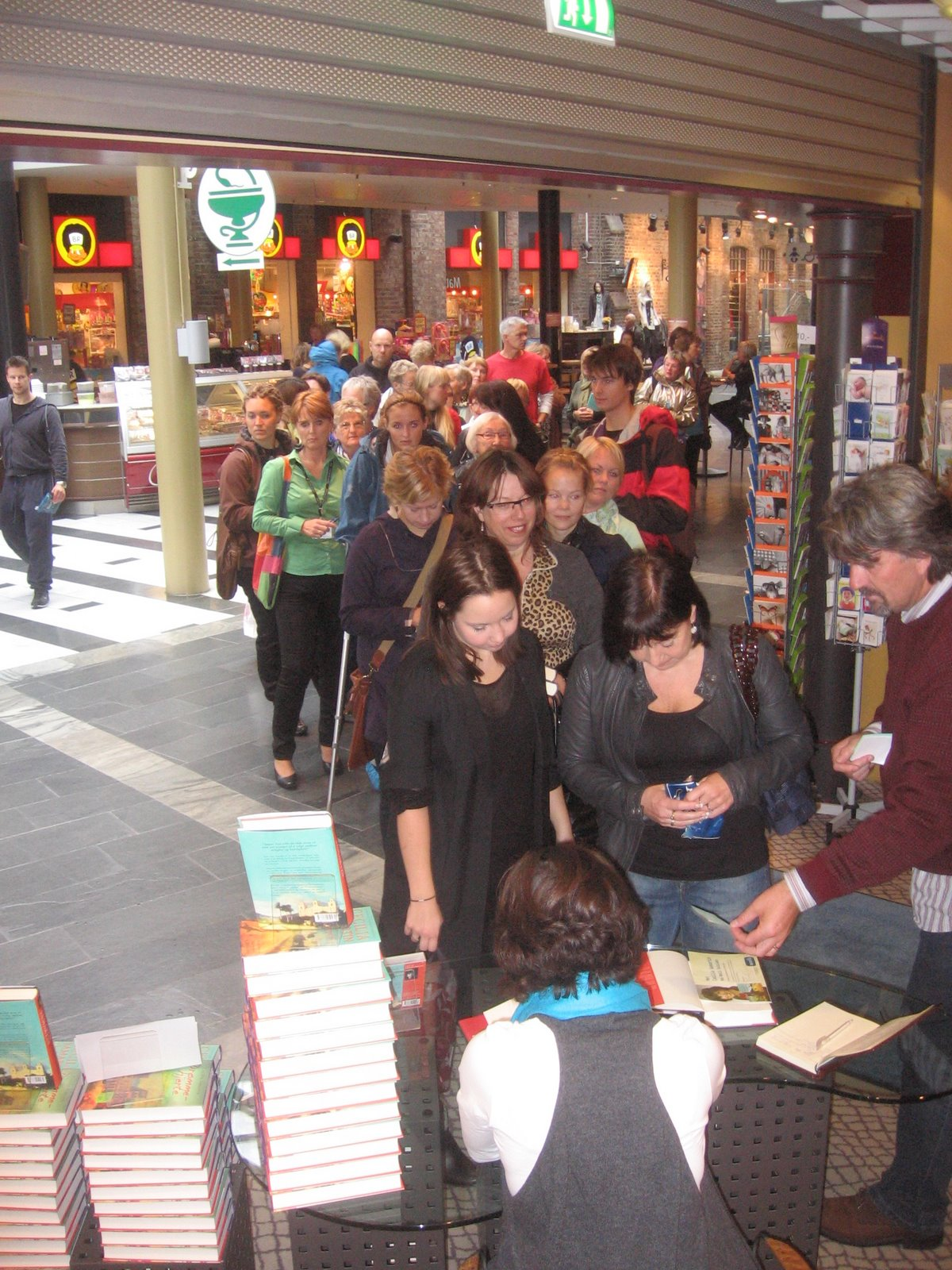
Cecilia at book signing in Norway

- Broken Paradise / Ghost Heart (2004)
- Tarnished Beauty / Señor Peregrino (2005)
- Vigil / Salvadorena (2009)
