= Aurelia Castillo de González =

Cuban writer (1842-1920)

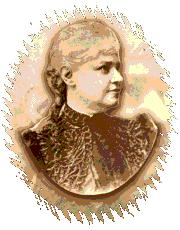
- Aurelia Castillo de González
- Born: 1842
- Died: 1920
- Occupation: Writer

Aurelia Castillo de González (known in Cuba as "nuestra Madame de Sévigné"; 1842–1920) was a Cuban writer. She wrote short stories, poems, prose, and was also a typographer, biographer, editor, and travel writer.

== Biography ==
Aurelia Castillo de González was born in Camagüey in 1842, spent much time in European travel, and then settled in Havana. She first attracted literary attention by her elegy on "El Lugareno" in 1866, and since that time, became an incessant contributor to Cuban literature in verse and prose. She was the author of a study of the life and works of Gertrudis Gómez de Avellaneda, of a volume of fables, and a number of satires. Five volumes of her works were published in 1913. Among her work is the translation of the book La hija de Yorio by Gabriele D'Annunzio. Castillo de González founded the Academia de Artes y Letras (Academy of Arts and Letters). She died in Camagüey in 1920.
