= Deafness in Cuba =

Deafness in Cuba encompasses many different topics. There are approximately 109,000 deaf people in Cuba. Some Cuban deaf people learn Cuban Sign Language, while others learn Spanish. Deaf culture is important to deaf people in Cuba.

== Deaf culture ==
The Deaf community in Cuba has a strong culture based on the presence of their own language, Cuban Sign Language, a shared history and similar struggles. This community not only has a shared language between them, but also a sense of identity and solidarity. The sharing of experiences, emotions, point of views, attitudes and perspectives show that there is a distinct Deaf community in Cuba. For many years, hearing people in Cuba would act negatively towards Deaf people, and for this reason, Deaf people now are wary in letting just any person into their shared Deaf spaces. The communication of the people in the Deaf community in Cuba is primarily that of Cuban Sign Language. Hearing people who learn the language later in life are not deemed part of the community, as the language is only completely dominated by native speakers of it. The Deaf culture in Cuba is one that is social, and expressive, examples of this include, applauding with their hands raised, and while doing a toast, they touch fingers instead of their cups.

== Deaf education ==
The first school for the deaf in Cuba was founded in the late 1800s in Havana. There were few deaf schools in the late 1800s and early 1900s. The methods to teach deaf children in these schools were primarily oralist, teaching them lip-reading and speaking orally. Although teaching in gestures was not allowed at this time, the old manual alphabet ("alfabeto manual antiguo") became increasingly common in these schools and among deaf individuals. Since it interfered with the oral teachings, the manual alphabet, too, was not accepted in the schools. In the year 1977, the manual alphabet started being used in the schools for the deaf, however, with the goal being to teach Spanish literacy and oral skills. This manual alphabet is no longer used by the majority of the population. In the 1990s, Cuban Sign Language was recognized and introduced in the curriculums of deaf schools. Around 2004, Modelo Cubano de Educación Bilingüe, an experimental project to teach deaf children Cuban Sign Language as their first language and Spanish, particularly in its written form, as their second language, emerged in three deaf schools in Cuba. This marked the beginning of having Cuban Sign Language be taught in most deaf schools. This created significant changes in the education system for the deaf in Cuba. The bilingual approach became increasingly more popular. Nowadays, the "dactilema" is used as a way of fingerspelling, to teach deaf children in school to read and write Spanish. The dactilema is also used in LSC to fingerspell words that don't have signs. With the continued emergence of a bilingual education model for deaf schools, comes more understanding for the need for a deaf child to learn sign, as their native language. There are three different educational models used today, total communication, bimodal, and bilingual. In total communication, the child is taught using all means of communication, oral, gestured, and sign. In bimodal education, the child learns sign and Spanish simultaneously. In bilingual education, the child is taught LSC as their native language, and Spanish as their second language. As of 2001, there are 17 schools for the deaf in Cuba, one in each province and three in the capital, Havana.

== Medical aspect ==
One of the main focuses in Cuba, is for early screening of hearing loss. This infant screening is given to infants who are at high risk of hearing loss due to several risk factors. If an infant is diagnosed with hearing loss, the infant will then be assigned to a team of professionals, ranging from language pathologists, neurophysicians, audiology technicians, and psychologists. For those who have a bilateral hearing loss of >35 HL, monaural and sometimes binaural amplification hearing devices are administered. There is a fee of 35 Cuban pesos for the hearing aid, however, the Cuban government will pay for it if the parent cannot afford to. Since the year 2000, cochlear implants have been available to Deaf people with profound hearing loss. Priority is given to Deaf-blind people with profound hearing loss. Around 250 Deaf children have been implemented with a cochlear implant since the year 2000.

== Deaf associations ==
=== ANSOC ===
In 1978, the Cuban National Association of Deaf (ANSOC, Asociación Nacional de Sordos de Cuba) was founded. Their main objectives are to fight for the equal rights and duties of Deaf Cubans and to facilitate a bilingual education for the Deaf community in Cuba. One noteworthy thing that ANSOC has contributed is establishing ANSOC News ("Noticiero ANSOC"), the only news program in Cuba to bring news information in Cuban Sign Language for the Deaf community in Cuba. The program even provides information to hearing viewers to better understand the signing and bring awareness to Cuban Deaf culture.

=== CENDSOR ===
The Center of Achievement and Development of the Deaf, Centro de superacion y desarollo del sordo, located in San Miguel del Padron, was created with the main objective to support the advancement of bilingualism, in the form of LSC as the native language and Spanish as a second language for deaf people. This center is the main hub in which research about LSC will take place.
