= Tania Díaz Castro =

Cuban journalist, poet and activist

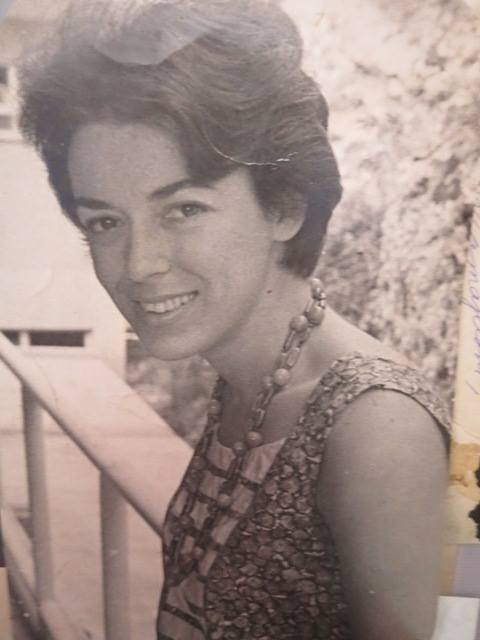
- Díaz Castro at age 30
- Born: April 30, 1939; Camajuaní, Cuba
- Died: February 4, 2024 (aged 84); Havana, Cuba
- Occupations: journalist, poet

Tania Díaz Castro (April 30, 1939 – February 4, 2024) was a Cuban journalist, poet, and activist.

== Biography ==
Tania Díaz Castro was born in Camajuaní, Villa Clara, in 1939. Her mother was a tobacco worker, and her father was a journalist and activist. She later moved with her family to Havana, where she attended the University of Havana for six months before dropping out, instead choosing to become a self-taught journalist.

Díaz Castro spent almost 60 years as a journalist, working for such newspapers and magazines as Prensa Libre, Hoy, La Tarde, Bohemia, Revista Trabajo, La Gaceta de Cuba, and Los CDR beginning in 1964. She was a founder of the National Union of Writers and Artists of Cuba (UNEAC), in 1961, and the Union of Journalists of Cuba. She was also a scriptwriter for the Cuban Institute of Radio and Television.

Also a poet, she published six books of poetry with various publishers. Her poetry deals with life in Cuba and themes of social justice.

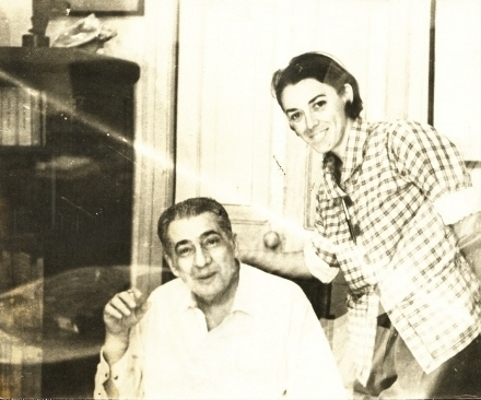
Tania Díaz Castro with José Lezama Lima

In 1972, Díaz Castro traveled to Japan, where she married a Japanese man, and while there she came to oppose socialism and especially communism. In 1977 she was expelled from UNEAC. In 1987 she joined the Movimiento de los Derechos Humanos, led by Ricardo Bofill Pagés, and became a founding member and secretary-general of the organization's party, the Partido Pro Derechos Humanos, which called for Fidel Castro to announce a plebiscite. For this activism, she was imprisoned twice, and was threatened to be shot if she continued her work. For over 20 years, she was a founding editor and contributor at the news site Cubanet, for which she is considered a pioneer of independent journalism in Cuba.

Díaz Castro was married three times—to Guillermo Rivas Porta, Ricardo Villares Fernández, and Masayoshi Kaizuka—and had three children.

She died in 2024, in Havana, at age 84.

== Selected works ==
- 1964, Apuntes para el tiempo. Ediciones Revolución
- 1970, Todos me van ha tener que oír. Ediciones Unión
- 1990, Everyone will have to listen (bilingual edition). Ediciones Ellas/Linden Lane Press
- 1996, Flores amarillas cortadas al anochecer. Ediciones Unión
- 1998, Mientras giran las hojas del arce. Ediciones Unión
- 2011, Inventar un hombre. ZV Lunáticas
- 2023, Más libres que los pájaros. Ediciones Deslinde
