= Monte Pedroso =

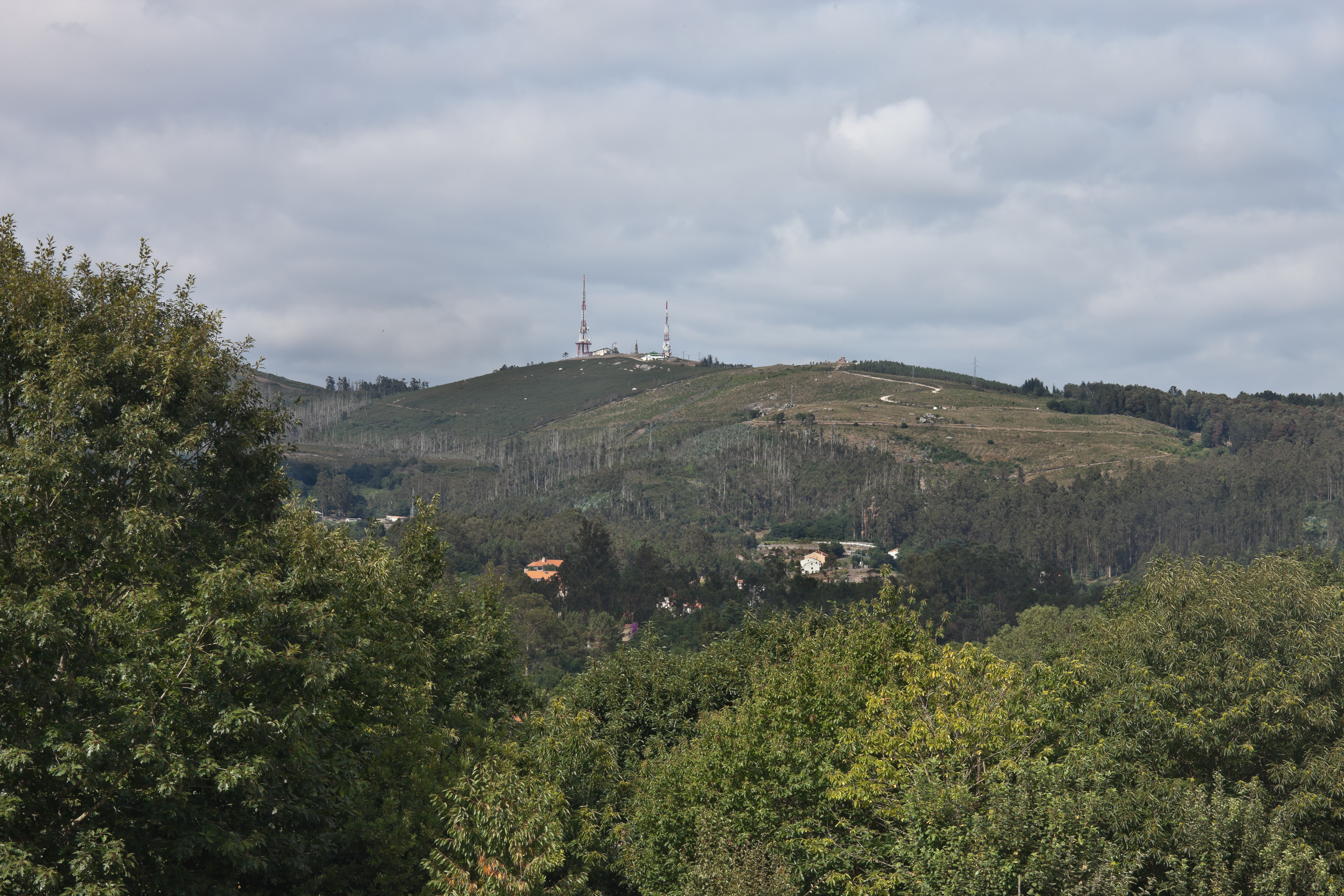

Highest point
- Elevation: 456 m (1,496 ft)
- Coordinates: 42°53′54″N 8°33′55″W

Geography
- Location within Spain
- Location: Galicia, Spain
- Parent range: Galician Massif

Climbing
- Easiest route: mountain hike

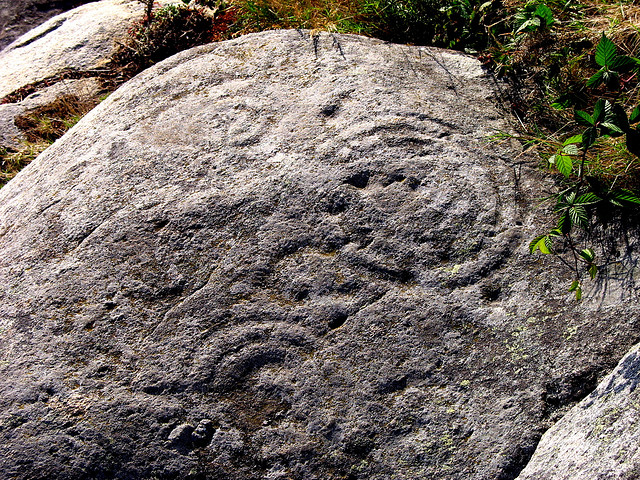
Petroglyphs close to the summit

Monte Pedroso is a granite summit close to Santiago de Compostela, Spain.

Being the highest peak in the vicinity of Santiago, it offers excellent views over the town. Several spiral-like petroglyphs dating to the Stone or Bronze Age have been found near the summit.
