= Antonio Benítez-Rojo =

Cuban novelist, essayist and short-story writer

- Born: March 14, 1931; Havana, Cuba
- Died: January 5, 2005 (aged 73); Northampton, Massachusetts, United States
- Occupations: Novelist; essayist; short-story writer
- Writing career
- Language: Spanish
- Period: 1967–2001
- Notable works: Tute de reyes; El mar de las lentejas; La isla que se repite
- Notable awards: Casa de las Américas Prize; 1967 Tute de reyes

Antonio Benítez-Rojo (March 14, 1931 – January 5, 2005) was a Cuban novelist, essayist and short-story writer. He was widely regarded as the most significant Cuban author of his generation. His work has been translated into nine languages and collected in more than 50 anthologies.

Born in Havana, he lived in Cuba with his mother and stepfather from the age of seven. In the mid-1950s, backed by United Nations grants, Benítez-Rojo studied statistics at the United States Department of Labor and Commerce, and later studied in Mexico. Turning down offers to work in Chile or Geneva, he returned to Cuba in 1958 and became head of the Statistics Bureau at Cuba's Labor Ministry.

Benítez-Rojo began working at the Ministry of Culture in 1965 and won the Premio Casa de las Américas for the short story collection Tute de reyes in 1967. The following year, he won a writers' union prize of a trip to a socialist country; however, the government did not permit him to leave Cuba.

By 1975, Benítez-Rojo had been made head of Casa de las Américas, the publishing house run by the Cuban government. Sea of Lentils, the English translation of his novel El mar de las lentejas, was selected by The New York Times as one of the Notable Books of 1992. In 1980, he was given permission to attend a conference at the Sorbonne in Paris. He traveled from Paris to Berlin, obtained a US tourist visa, and came to the United States, where he became a professor of Spanish at Amherst. The Archives and Special Collections at Amherst College holds a collection of his papers.

One of his most influential publications, La Isla que se Repite, was published in 1989 by Ediciones del Norte. He died in 2005, aged 73.

== List of works ==
- Tute de Reyes, 1967
- El escudo de hojas secas, 1969
- Los inquilinos 1976
- Heroica, 1977
- El mar de las lentejas (The Sea of Lentils), 1979
- "La isla que se repite: El Caribe y la perspectiva posmoderna", 1989 (first introduced in English as an essay, translated by James Maraniss and published as "The Repeating Island" (New England Review and Bread Loaf Quarterly, v. VII, n. 4, Summer 1985) then republished in book form as The Repeating Island: The Caribbean and the Postmodern Perspective (Duke University Press, 1992; second edition 1996).
- Antología Personal (Personal Anthology), 1997
- Mujer en traje de batalla (Women in Battle Dress), 2001
- Woman in Battle Dress—Translated from the Spanish by Jessica Powell (City Lights, 2015)
- A View from the Mangrove (short stories, translated by James Maraniss, published under the Faber Caribbean Series imprint in 1998)

== See also ==
- Caribbean literature
- Caribbean poetry
- Postcolonial literature
