= Isabel Moya =

Cuban journalist and feminist

Isabel Catalina Moya Richard (November 25, 1961 - March 4, 2018) was a Cuban journalist and feminist. Moya also taught communication studies at the University of Havana (UH) where she integrated feminist theory and advocated for inclusive journalism.

== Biography ==
Isabel Catalina Moya Richard was born in Havana on November 25, 1961. She was born with a condition that affected the ability of her bones to use a sufficient amount of calcium and was a wheelchair user throughout her life. Moya graduated from the University of Havana (UH) in 1984. Later she earned her doctorate in communication studies from UH.

When she first graduated from UH, she was first assigned a job in the Office of Nuclear Affairs, which she did not want to do. Later, she was given the choice to work for Mujeres (Women Magazine), which she took. Working for Mujeres gave her the opportunity to travel throughout Cuba doing journalistic work.

Moya went on to become an assistant professor in the communications department of UH. She was the first person in Cuba to work as a professor in communication studies specializing in studying gender in the field. In her work, she used feminist theory. She advocated for work in journalism that was free from sexist stereotypes and social stigma and which was also inclusive. She was critical of representations of gender in advertising. Moya also criticized anti-communist broadcasts from Radio Marti.

Moya created the Mirta Aguirre Chair of Gender at the José Martí Institutional Institute of Journalism. She was also the editor of the Editorial de la Mujer (The Woman's Editorial). Moya was also on the national secretariat of the Federation of Cuban Women.

In 2016, she received the Premio a la Dignidad (Dignity Prize) from the Cuban Journalist Union. Moya received the José Martí National Journalism Award in 2017, which is the highest award given to Cuban journalists.

Moya died on March 4, 2018, in Havana from breast cancer.

== Selected bibliography ==
- Del azogue y los espejos: ensayos de comunicación y género (2007)
- Sin contraseña: género y trasgresión mediática (2010)
- El sexo de los ángeles: una mirada de género a los medios de comunicación (2010)
