= Regino Pedroso =

Cuban poet

Regino Pedroso (April 5, 1896 – December 7, 1983) was a Cuban poet.

He won the National Poetry Prize of Cuba in 1939 for his book Beyond the sea sings. That same year published his poetic Anthology (1918-1938).

== Works ==
- We (Nosotros). Poems. Havana, Editorial Tropics, 1933.
- Poetic Anthology (Antología poética) (1918-1938). Havana, Imp Molina, 1939.
- Beyond the sea sings (Más allá canta el mar). Poem. Havana Imp Veronica, 1939.
- Bolivar Symphony freedom (Bolívar, sinfonía de libertad). Poem. Havana, P. Fernández, 1945.
- The Yuan Pei Fu plum (El ciruelo de Yuan Pei Fu). Chinese poems. Havana, P. Fernandez, 1955.
- Poems (Poemas). Prol. Nicolás Guillén. Anthology. Havana, Eds. Union, 1966.
- Poetry (Obra poética). "Regino Pedroso and the new Cuban poetry" by Felix Pita Rodriguez. Havana, Editorial Art and Literature, 1975.
