= Norberto Fuentes =

Cuban journalist (born 1943)

Norberto Fuentes (born March 2, 1943 Havana) is a writer and journalist.

He has published Hemingway in Cuba and Ernest Hemingway: Rediscovered, both available in English, as well as Dulces guerreros cubanos, Condenados de Condado (which received the Casa de las Américas Prize in 1968), Posición Uno, and El último Santuario. His work has been praised by today's most distinguished intellectuals, such as Italo Calvino, William Kennedy, Norman Mailer and Gabriel García Márquez. The Autobiography of Fidel Castro has been sold to major European publishing houses.

Fuentes was a close friend of Fidel Castro and thus had privileged knowledge of the Cuban secret service during some of the most difficult years of the Cuban Revolution. After spending many years alongside Castro, Fuentes tried to escape the island, was detained, and eventually released with the assistance of Gabriel García Márquez and William Kennedy. He currently lives in the United States.

Norberto Fuentes has provided information on drug, money laundering, and robberies perpetrated by Cuban agents or coordinated by Cuba.
