= Zoé Valdés =

Cuban novelist, poet, scriptwriter, film director and blogger

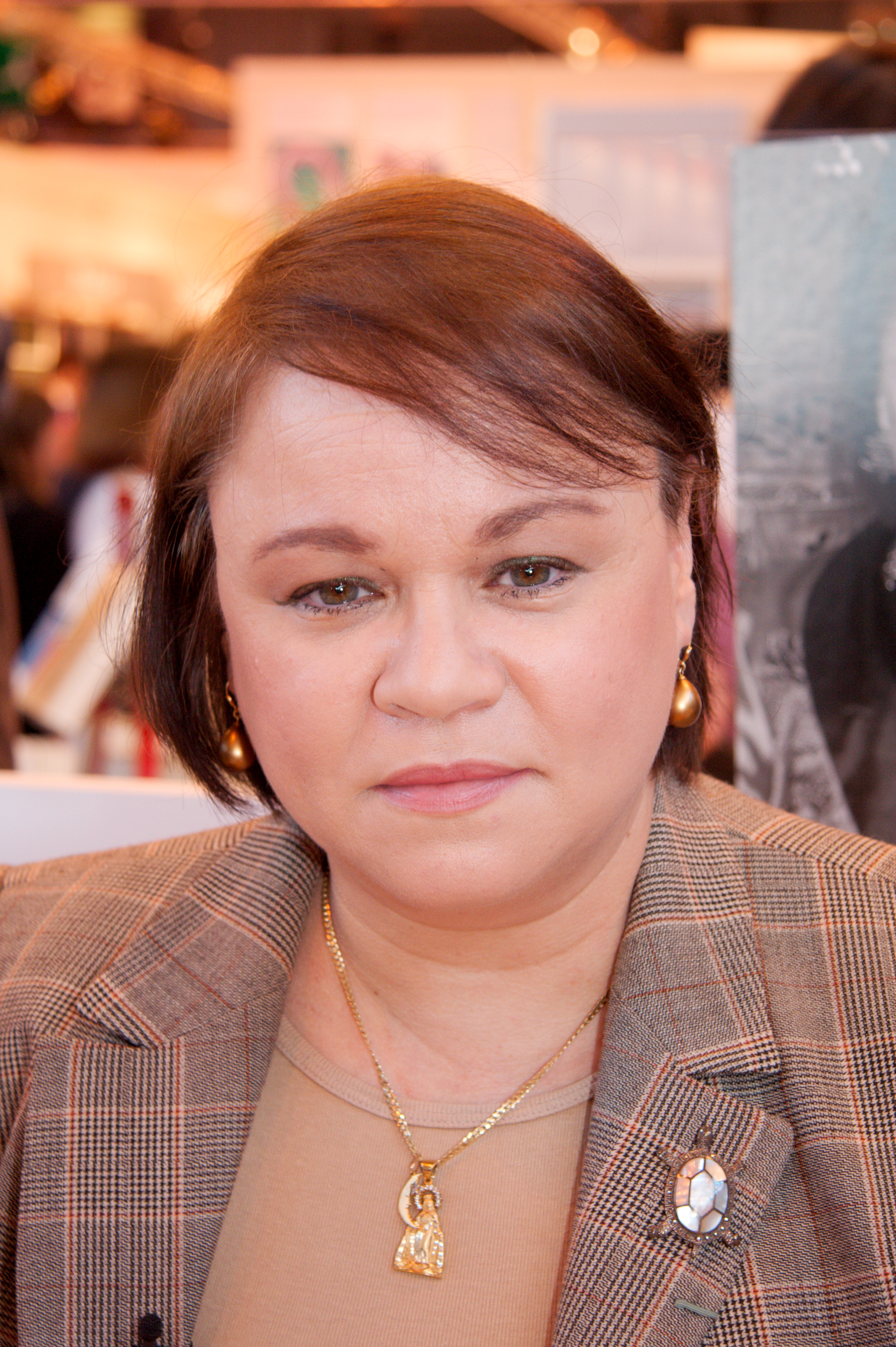
Zoé Valdés at a book fair in Paris, France, in March 2009

Zoé Valdés (born May 2, 1959, in Havana, Cuba) is a Cuban novelist, poet, scriptwriter, film director and blogger. She studied at the Instituto Superior Pedagógico Enrique José Varona, but did not graduate. From 1984 to 1988, she worked for the Delegación de Cuba at UNESCO in Paris and in the Oficina Cultural de la Misión de Cuba in Paris. From 1990 to 1995, she was an editor of the magazine Cine Cubano. She lives with her daughter in Paris. She has been married three times: with Cuban writer Manuel Pereira Quintero, Cuban government official José Antonio González and Cuban independent filmmaker Ricardo Vega.

== Early life and education ==
Zoé Valdés was educated by her mother and abandoned by her father when she was a child. Valdés began writing when she was nine or ten years old, thanks to her grandmother who would constantly read poetry to her. Her grandmother was of Chinese and Irish origins. When Valdés was seventeen she wrote her first poetry collection, Respuestas para vivir (1981). She published her first poem when she was 19 years old in El Caimán Barbudo, a literary magazine created and funded by communist youth. She published her first lyrical novel, Sangre Azul, in 1993.

Valdés was part of one of the first generations educated under the support of the Cuban Revolution. She studied at the Instituto Pedagógico Enrique Varona until her fourth year. She later received her degree in philology at the Universidad de La Habana and then continued her studies at the Alliance Francaise in Paris. From 1984 to 1988, she worked for the Delegación de Cuba at UNESCO in Paris and in the Oficina Cultural de la Misión de Cuba in Paris.

After returning to Cuba and being unemployed for a brief time, she became assistant director of the magazine Cine Cubano for four years (from 1990 to 1994). She also began to pursue a career as a scriptwriter for the Instituto Cubano del Arte e Industria Cinematográficos (ICAIC). In 1990 she traveled to the United States in order to start filming her script Vidas paralelas. The filming of her script was then moved to Venezuela. In 1990 she received the award Primer Premio Coral for the best unreleased screenplay for her script, Vidas paralelas at the XII Festival Internacional del Nuevo Cine Latinoamericano.

== Exile ==
Valdés was officially exiled from Cuba in 1994 for political reasons. As an open opponent of the Castro regime, Valdés always wanted to change the political scene in Cuba from within the country through her writing. However, she began to have issues with the magazine Cine Cubano and the Instituto Cubano del Arte e Industria Cinematográficos (ICAIC), specifically the magazine's director, Alfredo Guevara. Furthermore, in the 1980s she was arrested for driving two Spanish tourists around Habana because one of the laws of the regime prohibited Cubans to interact with foreigners. In 1991, she received an award that was asked to be donated to the Castro regime, which she refused to do. She also signed a publishing deal for her novel La nada cotidiana with a French publishing company, without consulting the government. The only other person to do so was Reinaldo Arenas who was condemned to two years in jail.

The Tugboat "13 de Marzo" massacre in July 1994 where 41 Cubans attempting to leave the country drowned at sea, pushed her to leave Cuba. In 1995 she left the country and moved to Paris with her husband at the time, the filmmaker Ricardo Vega, and her daughter Attys Luna, who was one and a half years old. She moved to Paris because she had an invitation from the Escuela Normal Superior to start a series of conferences about romantic poetry with Jose Martí. When her novel La nada cotidiana came out in France and she began to give interviews about her work, the regime in Cuba forbade her to return to the country. While she saw exile as a punishment, she also viewed it as a form of liberty where she could find herself through her studies and her writing. In 1997 she acquired Spanish nationality thanks to her editor, José Manuel Lara and Oleguer Sarsanedas from the publisher, Planeta. After she received her Spanish citizenship she was able to receive her French residency.

== Works ==
=== Poetry ===
Valdés made her debut in literature as a poet when in 1982 she won the award Primer Premio de Poesía Roque Dalton y Jaime Suárez Quemain for her poetry collection Respuestas para vivir. She describes her poetry as intimate, erotic and ironic. It explores themes of desire and the passage of time. Her influences include: Juana Borrero, Juan Clemente Zenea, José María Heredia, Constantino Cavafis, Fernando Pessoa, Dulce María Loynaz, Dorothy Parker, Federico García Lorca, Pablo Neruda, César Vallejo, José Martí, José Lezama Lima, Octavio Paz, José Emilio Pacheco, Jaime Sabines, and José Triana.

Her second collection of poems, Todo para una sombra received an accessit in the contest Premio Carlos Ortiz de Poesía in Spain in 1985. She published two other poetry collections in Spain titled Vagón para fumadores (1996) and Cuerdas para el lince (1999).

=== Film ===
Valdés wrote the screenplay for Vidas paralelas (1993), which tells the story of a man, Andy, who lives in Habana and dreams of moving to the United States. Another character, Rubén, resides in New Jersey and remembers his time in Cuba. She also was the scriptwriter of Amorosa and Desequilibrio y profecia. She was the scriptwriter and co-directed the film Caricias de Oshún (2000) with Ricardo Vega, her husband at the time.

=== Novels ===
Valdés' narratives are known for their semi autobiographical nature and their themes of nostalgia, sexuality, eroticism and masculine fragility. Furthermore, her novels demonstrate her anti-Castro politics as she explores a critical view of Cuba. She has published fifteen novels. Her work has been translated into English, German, Flemish, Polish, Portuguese, Italian, Serbian, Czech, Slovak, among other languages.

Valdés's first novel, Sangre azul (1993), written during 1987–1991 in Paris and Cuba, is the only one of her novels that was published in Cuba. In this novel, Attys is a young and beautiful Cuban woman who lives with her step-father since her father abandoned her when she was young. As a teenager she falls in love with Gnossis, a painter. After Gnossis moves to Paris, she decides to go and look for him. While she is unsuccessful in finding him, she is able to find herself.

One of her most well known novels is La nada cotidiana, published in 1995 in Paris by Editorial Sctes-Sud. It was also later published in Spain, Sweden, Holland, United States, Portugal, Brazil, Greece, England, Turkey, Australia and Switzerland. In this novel, the protagonist, Patria [Homeland], is born in the year of the triumph of the Cuban Revolution. The paradise promised by the revolution turns into a trap characterized by hopelessness and frustration. Patria relies on her writing to find any sense of real hope.

Another one of her novels is Café nostalgia, published in 1997. It tells the story of a woman, Marcela, who marries an old man in order to be able to leave Cuba. The novel explores the memories and life of a woman in exile. The novel is somewhat autobiographic.

Her novel Lobas de mar won the award Premio Fernando Lara de Novela in 2003. It is a historical fiction novel about two female Caribbean pirates.

She has also published two children's books: Los aretes de la Luna (1999) and Luna en el cafetal (2003), illustrated by artist Ramon Unzueta.

== Political views and online presence ==
Valdés is openly anticommunist and against the Fidel Castro regime. When she was six years old she started noticing that something was wrong in Cuba.

My family told me, "You must not repeat at school what you hear at home about Castro. And it was something that really left an impression on me because at home my mother and grandmother were against Castro, but at school everything that I heard was pro-Castro. So from a very early age I was taught two opposing ways of speaking and two opposing value systems."

— Zoé Valdés for The Daily Beast

She maintains a blog where she recurrently attacks the Cuban Revolution. She published an article in El Mundo about Fulgencio Batista where she declared that he was an antifascist and argued that rather than carrying out a coup d'état, he started a revolution. She has received a lot of backlash for her political views.

She shows on social networks her support for the conservative Spanish political party Vox, considered as a right-wing to far-right party by academics, political analysts, and many media outlets. Since February 2022, she began collaborating with La Gaceta de la Iberosfera, a VOX newspaper.

She has also supported Trump's re-election in the United States, of which she said in an article: "Let us pray that Donald Trump be re-elected in the next elections on November 3th [sic] -- a patriot, a humanist, a peacemaker..."

In 2020, she became a signatory of the Madrid Charter launched by Santiago Abascal, the leader of Vox, to fight communism around the world. The appeal is also understood as a first step towards the creation of a conservative international to wage a "cultural battle against the left".

She has generated great controversies publishing dozens of articles attacking several authors and public figures, and even opponents of the Cuban regime such as multi-awarded blogger Yoani Sánchez, artist and activist Tania Bruguera, Swedish climate activist Greta Thunberg, Spanish author Almudena Grandes, and others.

== Awards ==
- 1982 Premio de Poesía Roque Dalton y Jaime Suárez Quemain
- 1996 Finalista del Premio Planeta por "Te di la vida entera".
- 1997 Premio Liberatur por La nada cotidiana.
- 2003 Premio Fernando Lara por "Lobas de mar".
- 2004 Premio de Novela Ciudad de Torrevieja, La Eternidad del Instante
- 2013 Premio Azorín por "La mujer que llora".

== Books ==
- 2025 París era una rumba
- 2016 La noche al revés. Dos historias cubanas
- 2016 The Weeping Woman
- 2015 La Habana, mon amour
- 2013 La mujer que llora
- 2012 El ángel azul
- 2010 El todo cotidiano
- 2008 La ficción Fidel
- 2006 Bailar con la vida
- 2004 La eternidad del instante
- 2003 Lobas de mar
- 2001 Milagro en Miami
- 2000 El pie de mi padre
- 1999 Querido primer novio (English translation, Dear First Love, 2003)
- 1999 Los aretes de la luna
- 1999 Cuerdas para el lince
- 1998 Traficantes de belleza
- 1997 Café Nostalgia
- 1997 Los poemas de la Habana
- 1996 Te di la vida entera (English translation, I Gave You All I Had, 2011)
- 1996 Cólera de ángeles
- 1995 La nada cotidiana (English translation, Yocandra in the Paradise of Nada, 1999)
- 1995 La hija del embajador
- 1993 Sangre azul
- 1986 Respuestas para vivir
- 1986 Todo para una sombra
- 1986 Vagón para fumadores

== Screenplays ==
Zoé Valdés has written several scripts for films:

- Vidas paralelas, Director Pastor Vega
- Amorosa, Director Pilar Távora
- Espiral, Director Miriam Talavera
- Yalodde, Director Ricardo Vega
- Desequilibrio
- Cantata
- Profecía
