= Juana Borrero =

Cuban artist (1877–1896)

- Born: May 18, 1877; Havana, Cuba
- Died: March 9, 1896 (aged 18); Key West, Florida, U.S.
- Known for: Painting, Poetry

Juana Borrero Pierra (May 18, 1877 – March 9, 1896) was a Cuban painter and poet.

== Biography ==
Juana Borrero was born May 18, 1877. She was a native of the Santos Suárez neighborhood of Havana. She was the daughter of the writer and patriot Esteban Borrero Echevarría and of Consuelo Pierra.

Borrero began painting when she was five. She wrote her first poem at seven, and spoke multiple languages by the time she was ten. The poet Julian de Casal was a family friend and became her literary mentor.

In 1887, she entered the San Alejandro Arts Academy; by 1891 her poems were being published in magazines around Cuba, including La Habana Elegante, one of the leading periodicals of the time.

She died of tuberculosis, in Key West, Florida, at the age of eighteen. She was buried in Key West, in a tomb belonging to friends of her family. Her gravesite was unidentified until a 1972 study by the Cuban Society of Archaeology and Ethnology in Exile. Her body was exhumed and transferred to her own tomb, with the inscription "Glory of Cuba" on her tombstone.

== See also ==
- Cuban American literature
- List of Cuban-American writers
