= Cuban literature =

Cuban literature is the literature written in Cuba or outside the island by Cubans in Spanish language. It began to find its voice in the early 19th century. The major works published in Cuba during that time were of an abolitionist character. Notable writers of this genre include Gertrudis Gómez de Avellaneda and Cirilo Villaverde. Following the abolition of slavery in 1886, the focus of Cuban literature shifted. Dominant themes of independence and freedom were exemplified by José Martí, who led the modernista movement in Latin American literature. Writers such as the poet Nicolás Guillén focused on literature as social protest. Others, including Dulce María Loynaz, José Lezama Lima and Alejo Carpentier, dealt with more personal or universal issues. And a few more, such as Reinaldo Arenas and Guillermo Cabrera Infante, earned international recognition in the postrevolutionary era.

Most recently, there has been a so-called Cuban "boom" among authors born during the 1950s and '60s. Many writers of this younger generation have felt compelled to continue their work in exile due to perceived censorship by the Cuban authorities. Many of them fled abroad during the 1990s. Some well-known names include Daína Chaviano (USA), Zoé Valdés (France), Eliseo Alberto (Mexico), Pedro Juan Gutiérrez (Cuba), Antonio Orlando Rodríguez (Cuba) and Abilio Estévez (Spain).

Cuban literature is one of the most prolific, relevant and influential literatures in Latin America and all the Spanish-speaking world, with renowned writers including José Martí, Gertrudis Gómez de Avellaneda, José María Heredia, Nicolás Guillén (the National Poet of Cuba), José Lezama Lima, Alejo Carpentier (nominee for the Nobel Prize for Literature), Guillermo Cabrera Infante, Virgilio Piñera and Dulce María Loynaz, among many others. The culture of deep writing and memory in Cuba cultivated during the Spanish Empire. The Spanish brought with them cronistas who recorded and described all important events.The most important cronista to arrive in Cuba in the 16th century was Bartolomé de las Casas, a friar who authored, among other texts, the History of the Indies

== History ==
Spanish language literature began in the Cuban territory with the Spanish conquest and colonization. The conquistadors brought with them cronistas who recorded and described all important events, although they did so with the Spanish point of view and for the Spanish reading public. The most important cronista to arrive in Cuba in the 16th century was Bartolomé de las Casas, a friar who authored, among other texts, the History of the Indies.

The first literary work written on the island dates to the 17th century, when in 1608 Silvestre de Balboa y Troya de Quesada (1563–1647) published Espejo de paciencia, a historical epic poem in royal octavo that narrates the capture of the friar Juan de las Cabezas Altamirano by the pirate Gilberto Girón.

Cuban writing began with poetry, and there were few other significant works written in the 17th century.

=== 18th century ===
It was not until 1739 that the first play by a Cuban appeared in Sevilla under the title El príncipe jardinero y fingido Cloridano ("The Garden Prince and the Hypocritical Cloridano") by Santiago Pita. It is a comedy portraying the artificial expressions of the time, with occasional reminiscences of Lope de Vega, Calderón de la Barca and Augustín Moreto.

True Cuban poetic tradition began with Manuel de Zequeira y Arango and Manuel Justo de Rubalcava toward the end of the 18th century, despite the fact that Espejo de paciencia had been published a century and a half earlier. This can be affirmed not only by the quality of their respective works, but also by their typical Cuban style, which had already grown apart from that of Spain. The ode to indigenous nature became the tone and primary theme of Cuban poetry. Among the best inaugural poems are the ode "A la piña" by Zequeira and "Silva cubana" by Rubalcava.

=== 19th century ===
Cuban neoclassicism (ca. 1790–1820) was characterized by the use of classic forms similar to those of ancient Greece, with equaled invocations of Greco-Latin gods but with a singular prominence given to nature with the clear intention of distancing itself from Europe. Francisco Pobeda y Armenteros was a poet who can be placed midway between "high culture" and "popular culture" and whose style was one of the first to initiate the process of "Cubanization" in poetry. Soon afterward, Domingo del Monte attempted to do the same, proposing the "Cubanization" of romance. Del Monte also set himself apart by his fundamental work in the organizing and correspondence of literary circles.

Romanticism matured in Cuba due to one figure with continental status whose poetic works broke with Spanish-language tradition (including that of classical Greece), dominated then by varying levels of neoclassicism. José María Heredia was born in Santiago de Cuba in 1803 and died in Toluca, Mexico in 1839, and besides being the first great Romantic poet and Cuban exile, he was an essayist and dramaturge. He founded the critical and literary newspaper El Iris in 1826 together with the Italians Claudio Linati and Florencio Galli. He also founded two magazines: Miscelánea (1829–1832) and La Minerva (1834). Among his best known poems are two descriptive-narrative silvas: "En el teocalli de Cholula" (written between 1820 and 1832), which admires the great Aztec ruins of Cholula in Mesoamerica and reproves pre-Hispanic religion, and "Al Niágara" (1824), which covers the imposing and wild waterfalls of Niagara and develops a new voice: the romantic "I" attributed to nature.

Other notable romantic authors were Gabriel de la Concepción Valdés ("Plácido") and Juan Francisco Manzano. Among the adherents to American regionalism was José Jacinto Milanés, while Gertrudis Gómez de Avellaneda, a distinguished figure of Hispanic American Romanticism, triumphed on foreign soil and was criticized by the orthodoxy of Cintio Vitier in the 20th century.

The next milestone of Cuban poetry came with the rise of two poets: Juan Clemente Zenea (1832–1871) and Luisa Pérez de Zambrana (1837–1922), who, like Merecedes Matamoros, achieved high literary qualities in their works. Therefore, when the Modernist generation erupted on stage, there already existed a Cuban poetic tradition, but one that could be said to lack the degree of universality that was brilliantly reached by José Martí (1853–1895).

Foreign influences, French above all, came together in another essential poet: Julián del Casal. Most notable in his work was the cognitive, artistic production of word as art, not exempt from emotions, from tragedy or from the vision of death.

The 19th century saw Cuban philosophers and historians such as Félix Varela, José Antonio Saco and José de la Luz y Caballero paving the way for the period of independence. Cirilo Villaverde, Ramón de Palma and José Ramón Betancourt wrote abolitionist literature. Meanwhile, a national literature flourished with José Victoriano Betancourt and José Cárdenas Rodríguez and a late Romanticism with the so-called "reacción del buen gusto" ("reaction of good taste") of Rafael María de Mendive, Joaquín Lorenzo Luaces and José Fornaris. Noteworthy as a literary criticism was Enrique José Varona.

=== 20th century ===
The 20th century opened with an independent republic mediated by U.S. occupation that, with the repeal of the Platt Amendment in 1933, began to create its own institutions. Cuba had finished a bloody war of independence from Spain with the help of the United States, by which Cuban literature in the first half of the century continued to be marked, not only with the influx of great writers such as Julián del Casal and José Martí, the first Cuban modernists, but also with a contradictory consolidation of Spanish culture with national identity. The American government had a positive in influence in Cuba as it helped the Cubans with the task of building a new nation.

==== Poetry ====
Above all, Casal was the great canonic figure of Cuban poetry at the end of the 19th century and the beginning of the 20th. "His energy, apart from that which he had in late-19th century modernism, which was decisive, reached to the level of Regino Boti and, above all, José Manuel Poveda – the latter dedicated his ‘Canto élego’ to him" – and even to the level of Rúben Martínez Villena and José Zacarías Tallet. "How would the lyrical exoticism of Regino Pedroso, the symbolist intimacy of Dulce María Loynaz, the poetic sentimentality of Eugenio Florit, the refined and solitary purism of Mariano Brull [...] or the neo-Romanticism of Emilio Ballagas and the part-romantic, part-modernist vein in some of Nicolás Guillén’s poetry be understood without an antecedent like Casal?"

Before the definitive arrival of the vanguards, the 1920s brought the development of a kind of poetry that anticipated the social and human unrest of the next decade. In this category, Agustín Acosta, José Zacarías Tallet and Rubén Martínez Villena stand out.

Acosta was the most relevant of these poets, primarily for his work La zafra (1926), which poeticizes in pastoral verse the reality of working in the fields. Acosta furthered himself from Modernism with this poem, yet he still did not enter into the radicalism of some vanguards.

Modernism is considered to have ended with Poemas en menguante (1928) by Mariano Brull, one of the principal representatives of pure poetry in Cuba. Two nearly divergent lines developed in the course of the avant-garde: 1) the realist line of African, social and political themes in which Nicolás Guillén excelled and 2) the introspective and abstract line that had its most recognized representatives in Dulce María Loynaz and Eugenio Florit. Midway between both tendencies lies the work of Emilio Ballagas, the poet who, according to Luis Alvarez, caused the neo-Baroque of José Lezama Lima.

In 1940, the magazine Revista Orígenes, which concentrated on both Cuban and universal topics, was launched by a group led by Lezama Lima (1910–1976) that included Ángel Gaztelu, Gastón Baquero, Octavio Smith, Cintio Vitier, Fina García Marruz and Eliseo Diego.

Other distinguished poets of this generation were Lorenzo García Vega, Samuel Feijóo, Mary Stanley Low and Félix Pita Rodríguez, but Lezama Lima was by far the central figure of Cuban poetry by mid-century. Dense metaphors, complex syntax and conceptual obscurity define the Baroque poetic environment, which consisted in a struggle to reach a vision through which life would not continue seeming like "a yawning succession, a silent tear". Lezama Lima's work spans various volumes of poetry, including Muerte de Narciso (1937), Enemigo rumor (1947), Fijeza (1949) and Dador (1960).

The so-called "Generation of the Fifty" (authors born between 1925 and 1945) looked to master poets "del patio", such as Lezama Lima and Florit, although they broke off in different currents, including neo-Romanticism, in order to cultivate what would by the 1960s be the last current of the 20th century, as clearly accepted by numerous poets: colloquialism.

However, it is important to mention first the absurd and existential tone of Virgilio Piñera, the Creole sense conveyed by Eliseo Diego and Fina García Murruz, the late but effective outcome of José Zacarías Tallet's book La semilla estéril (1951), the dialogue with the common man in the second part of "Faz" by Samuel Feijóo, the intertextuality reached by Nicolás Guillén in "Elegía a Jesús Menéndez", the aforementioned conversational emphasis of Florit in "Asonante final" and other poems (1955), and finally the then-closed intimacy of Dulce María Loynaz with her distinctive work "Últimos días de una casa" (1958). It is said that poetry began to "democratize" by exploring the "common dialogue" or that it tried to discover lyrical referents with epic notes.

"In the initial years of the Revolution, the intimate tone predominate in the previous decades seemed insufficient, and preceding social poetry (of protest, complaint and combat) was no longer appropriate for the new social circumstances."

The use of conversational tone converged with a dose of epic style with symbolic interests. This class of poetry narrated everyday life circumstances while exalting a society engaged in social revolution.

A politicized poetry began to form that avoided tropology and traditional uses of meter. It lasted at least two decades, although it was still practiced throughout the 20th century by poets who did not change their discursive attitude.

Almost all major writers and poets from the class of 1930 to 1940 (Fayad Jamís, Pablo Armando Fernández, Rolando Escardó, Heberto Padilla, César López, Rafael Alcides, Manuel Díaz Martínez, Antón Arrufat, Domingo Alfonso and Eduardo López Morales, among others) were essentially colloquialists. Notable women poets of this era included Emilia Bernal, Dulce María Loynaz, Carilda Oliver Labra, Rafaela Chacón Nardi, and Serafina Núñez.

The first class of poets (the Generation of the Fifty born between 1925 and 1929) had neo-Romantic, Origenist and even surrealist traits. These included Cleva Solís, Carilda Oliver Labra, Rafaela Chacón Nardi, Roberto Friol and Francisco de Oráa.

The third class, born between 1940 and 1945, were not much different from the more radical prose writers and some of them identified with such writers. Colloquialism survived strongly at least until the mid-1980s in writers such as Luis Rogelio Nogueras, Nancy Morejón, Víctor Casaus, Guillermo Rodríguez Rivera, Jesús Cos Causse, Raúl Rivero, Lina de Feria, Delfín Prats, Magaly Alabau and Félix Luis Viera.

The class of poets born between 1946 and 1958 were marked by two tendencies: those who followed the meter (mainly décimas and sonnets) and those who employed free verse with lines of individual ranges. Both tendencies moved toward a formal, linguistic experimentalism, but the conversational tone was maintained as is evident, for example, in the works of Osvaldo Navarro, Waldo González, Alberto Serret, Raúl Hernández Novás, Carlos Martí, Reina María Rodríguez, Alberto Acosta-Pérez, Virgilio López Lemus, Esbértido Rosendi Cancio, Ricardo Riverón Rojas, León de la Hoz, Ramón Fernández-Larrea and Roberto Manzano.

A new generation of poets made themselves known during the latter half of the 1980s, when those born after 1959 began to publish. This generation was also identified by their diversity and existed on equal terms with the preceding generations. This was a notable phenomenon—the confluence of poets born after 1959 with many of those born in the 1940s and 1950s, all of whom continued contributing to a revitalized poetry, as can be seen, for example, in books by Mario Martínez Sobrino, Roberto Manzano and Luis Lorente.

The stylistic and formal sign most distinctive of this last generation of poets had been decisively influenced by the poetic giants José Lezama Lima and Virgilio Piñera, to whom the majority of these poets recognize as maestros. Other writers who reached full maturity during these times were Sigfredo Ariel, Chely Lima, Jesús David Curbelo, Antonio José Ponte, Rita Martín, Orlando Rossardi, Emilio García Montiel, Carlos Alfonso, Frank Abel Dopico, Damaris Calderón, Teresa Melo, Nelson Simón, Juana García Abas, Ronel González, León Estrada, Reinaldo García Blanco, Rito Ramón Aroche, Caridad Atencio, Ismael González Castañer, Carlos Esquivel Guerra, Alpidio Alonso Grau, Alberto Sicilia Martínez, Ricardo Alberto Pérez, Manuel Sosa, Sonia Díaz Corrales, Norge Espinosa, Pedro Llanes, Edel Morales, Arístides Vega Chapú, Francis Sánchez, Ileana Álvarez, Rigoberto Rodríguez Entenza, Berta Kaluf, Luis Manuel Pérez Boitel, Laura Ruiz, Odette Alonso, Dolan Mor, Alberto Lauro, William Navarrete, Carlos Pintado, Alfredo Zaldívar, Yamil Díaz and Edelmis Anoceto Vega.

In the 1990s, a new current of Cuban lyric rose that broke with the colloquialism of the generation before and explored traditional verse forms and free verse with its rhythmic and expressive possibilities, in accordance with the work of preceding authors such as José Kozer. The canon of new poetry appeared in the independent magazine Jácara, particularly the issue in 1995 that compiled an anthology of the generation. There were many young authors who participated in what amounted to a revolution of Cuban literature that distanced itself from political themes and created a clearer and more universal lyric. These poets included Luis Rafael, Jorge Enrique González Pacheco, Celio Luis Acosta, José Luis Fariñas, Ásley L. Mármol, Aymara Aymerich, David León, Arlén Regueiro, Liudmila Quincoses and Diusmel Machado.

"The work of poets who emigrated from Cuba generally reflected the creative threads developed by the evolution of poetry taking place within Cuba. Many of these poets belonged to the Generation of the Fifty, such as Heberto Padilla, Belkis Cuza Malé, Juana Rosa Pita, Rita Geada, José Kozer, Ángel Cuadra, Esteban Luis Cárdenas and Amelia del Castillo. The majority of the most active authors were born between 1945 and 1959, and as a general rule they adopted the conversational tone and usually distanced themselves from the themes of aggressive, political militancy. Furthermore, they treated the island home with the nostalgia so typical of Cuban emigration poetry from Heredia to the present day. Any political components were very discreet. As a rule, they did not write a poetry of militancy against the Revolution like that which can be found in the lyrical work of Reinaldo Arenas, for example. Also, varieties of form, style and content were prominent, mostly because the territorial centers of these poets were more dispersed than those of the island, the central cities of immigrant Cubans being Miami, New York, Mexico City and Madrid. Two maestros of Cuban poetry, Eugenio Florit and Gastón Baquero, were a part of this emigration, as well as Agustín Acosta, José Ángel Buesa, Ángel Gaztelu, Justo Rodríguez Santos and Lorenzo García Vega, among other figures of the national lyrical tradition."

Among the poets born after 1959, especially in the 1960s, and who resided outside Cuba were Antonio José Ponte, María Elena Hernández, Damaris Calderón, Dolan Mor, Alessandra Molina, Odette Alonso and Rita Martin.

==== Narrative literature ====
By far the highest figure of Cuban narrative literature in the 20th century was Alejo Carpentier (1904–1980). Novelist, essayist and musicologist, he greatly influenced the development of Latin American literature, particularly by his style of writing, which incorporates several dimensions of imagination—dreams, myths, magic and religion—in his concept of reality. He won a Miguel de Cervantes Prize, regarded as a sort of Spanish-language Nobel Prize in Literature, and was nominated for a Nobel Prize. José Lezama Lima and Guillermo Cabrera Infante were two other important Cuban novelists of universal stature.

===== Novels =====
Toward the end of the 19th century, with the publication of Cecilia Valdés (1882) by Cirilo Villaverde and Mi tío el empleado (1887) by Ramón Meza, the Cuban novel began to lose its semblance.

However, during the first 30 years of the 20th century, the production of novels was scarce. The most distinguished narrator during this time was Miguel de Carrión, who built a readership around the subject of feminism in his novels Las honradas (1917) and Las impuras (1919). Other distinguished novels of this period were Juan Criollo (1927) by Carlos Loveira and Las impurezas de la realidad (1929) by José Anotonio Ramos.

The Cuban novel could be said to have experienced a revolution by the mid-20th century, at the pinnacle of which came the publication of El reino de este mundo (1949) and El siglo de las luces (1962), both by Alejo Carpentier, along with authors such as Lino Novás Calvo, Enrique Serpa, Carlos Montenegro, Enrique Labrador Ruiz, Dulce María Loynaz, and Virgilio Piñera. In early works by Lisandro Otero, Humberto Arenal, Jaime Sarusky, Edmundo Desnoes and José Soler Puig, social realism converged with magic realism, absurdism and the "marvelous reality" of Carpentier.

Another significant moment for Cuban novel writing occurred in 1966 with the publication of Paradiso by José Lezama Lima, not to mention other notable novels of the 1960s, such as Pailock, el prestigitador by Ezequiel Vieta, Celestino antes del alba by Reinaldo Arenas, Adire y el tiempo roto by Manuel Granados and Miguel Barnet’s part-historical, part-literary novel Biografía de un cimarrón.

Between 1967 and 1968, a significant burst of literature took place inside and outside of Cuba with works such as Tres tristes tigres by Guillermo Cabrera Infante, El mundo alucinante by Reinaldo Arenas and De donde son los cantantes by Severo Sarduy.

The 1970s was a period of digression in the overall development of the Cuban novel. With the exception of Alejo Carpentier in his twilight, Severo Sarduy and the return of José Soler Puig with El pan dormido, the Cuban novel entered a low period characterized by Ambrosio Fornet. However, the novel Antes que anochezca by Reinaldo Arenas, especially its film adaptation, had an international impact.

Neither Manuel Cofiño nor Miguel Cossio were able to come close to the caliber of the previous period. The nascent police novel still was not producing good results, and beginning novelists were too constrained by the superficial division between the Revolution’s past and present. Toward the end of the decade, the novel form began to recover with the first books written by Manuel Pereira, Antonio Benítez Rojo and Alfredo Antonio Fernández, who turned their attention to the Latin American "boom", at which time another genre was born inside and outside of Cuba—la memoria novelada ("fictionalized memory")—with De Peña Pobre by Cintio Vitier and La Habana para un infante difunto by Guillermo Cabrera Infante.

Between 1983 and 1989, another change was effected that again brought the Cuban novel to national and international interest. Works including Un rey en el jardín by Senel Paz, Temporada de ángeles by Lisandro Otero, Las iniciales de la tierra by Jesús Díaz and Oficio de angel by Miguel Barnet received acclaim from critics and readers during the phenomenon of a rebirth of Cuban novel writing.

With regard to the current scene, debated studies from the International Colloquium "El mundo caribeño: retos y dinámicas" ("The Caribbean world: challenges and dynamics), which took place in June 2003 at the Michel de Montaigne University Bordeaux 3, concluded that we are now encountering "a literature that does not shut up or stop joking, a literature of disenchantment and natural pessimism that is very realist, sometimes violent, and that touches on themes that beforehand were taboo, inhibited and censured, such as homosexuality, religious discrimination, marginality, the incidents of the war in Angola, the debacle of socialism, double standards, new riches, corruption of the white collar class, prostitution, drugs, the uncertain future, the pain of exile, etc." The symposium's distinguished authors included Leonardo Padura, Fernando Velázquez Medina, Abilio Estévez, Miguel Mejides, Julio Travieso, Jorge Luis Hernández, Alexis Díaz Pimienta, Ronaldo Menéndez, Mylene Fernández, David Mitrani Arenal, Arturo Arango, Guillermo Vidal, Antonio Rodríguez Salvador, Reinaldo Montero, Alberto Garrandés, Eduardo del Llano, Rodolfo Alpízar, Jesús David Curbelo, Raul Aguiar, Luis Cabrera Delgado, Andrés Casanova, Ena Lucía Portela, Alberto Garrido and Francisco López Sacha.

However, there are many exiled authors whose works have gained enormous recognition and have spread internationally, such as Eliseo Alberto Diego, Daína Chaviano, Antonio Orlando Rodríguez, Pedro Juan Gutiérrez, Zoé Valdés, Antonio José Ponte, Amir Valle, Jocy Medina, Armando de Armas, Norberto Fuentes and José Manuel Prieto. Also, Uruguayan-born Daniel Chavarría lives in Cuba and has won multiple international prizes for his writings.

===== Short stories =====
The first book of integral short stories by a Cuban author was Lecturas de Pascuas by Esteban Borrero, published in 1899. For the next forty years, the genre began a slow rise on the island, and few are the authors who belonged to it: Jesús Castellanos with De tierra adentro (1906), Alfonso Hernández Catá with Los frutos ácidos (1915) and Piedras preciosas (1924), Luis Felipe Rodríguez with La pascua de la tierra natal (1928) and Marcos Antilla (1932), and Enrique Serpa with Felisa y yo (1937).

The period of maturity began in the 1930s, with writers who included Virgilio Piñera and his Cuentos Fríos (1956), Alejo Carpentier with La guerra del tiempo (1958) and Onelio Jorge Cardoso with El cuentero (1958). Onelio Jorge Cardoso portrayed the simple life of the countryside and has been dubbed El Cuentero Mayor ("The Best Storyteller").

Among other works published before 1960 are Cayo Canas (1942), by Lino Novás Calvo, El gallo en el espejo (1953), by Enrique Labrador Ruiz and Así en la paz como en la guerra (1960) by Guillermo Cabrera Infante. "“Los años duros" by Jesús Díaz. From 1966 to 1970, many short story collections were written, including Condenados de Condado (1968), by Norberto Fuentes, Tiempo de cambio (1969) by Manuel Cofiño, Los pasos en la hierba (1970) by Eduardo Heras León, Días de guerra (1967) by Julio Travieso, Escambray en sombras (1969) by Arturo Chinea, Ud. sí puede tener un Buick (1969) by Sergio Chaple and Los perseguidos (1970) by Enrique Cirules.

The years from 1971 to 1975 are known as the "Quinquenio Gris" (roughly "Five-year Grey Period"). The National Congress of Education and Culture, held from April 23 to April 30, 1971, set out to establish a policy to abolish the inquisitive and questioning role of literature, which bore negative consequences for the short story writing of those times. Despite that, works published during the five-year period include El fin del caos llega quietamente (1971) by Ángel Arango, Onoloria (1973) by Miguel Collazo, Los testigos (1973) by Joel James and Caballito blanco (1974) by Onelio Jorge Cardoso.

The decade of the 1970s finished its course with works that included Al encuentro (1975) by Omar González, Noche de fósforos (1976) by Rafael Soler, Todos los negros tomamos café (1976) by Mirta Yáñez, Los lagartos no comen queso (1975) by Gustavo Euguren, Acquaria (1975) by Guillermo Prieto, El arco de Belén (1976) by Miguel Collazo, Acero (1977) by Eduardo Heras León and El hombre que vino con la lluvia (1979) by Plácido Hernández Fuentes.

Cuban short story writing continued to increase in the 1980s. Relevant books from this decade include El niño aquel (1980) and El lobo, el bosque y el hombre nuevo by Senel Paz, Tierrasanta (1982) by Plácido Hernández Fuentes, El jardín de las flores silvestres (1982) by Miguel Mejides, Las llamas en el cielo (1983) by Félix Luis Viera, Donjuanes and Fabriles (1986) by Reinaldo Montero, Descubrimiento del azul (1987) by Francisco López Sacha, Sin perder la ternura (1987) by Luis Manuel García Méndez, Se permuta esta casa (1988) by Guillermo Vidal, El diablo son las cosas (1988) by Mirta Yáñez, Noche de sábado (1989) by Abel Prieto Jiménez, La vida es una semana (1990) by Arturo Arango and Ofelias by Aida Bahr.

A true peak in publishing occurred from 1990 onward with the generation known as the "Novísimos". Some of the members of this generation had already been published toward the end of the 1980s. They include Alberto Garrido, José Mariano Torralbas, Amir Valle, Ana Luz García Calzada, Rita Martín, Alberto Abreu Arcia, Guillermo Vidal, Jesús David Curbelo, Jorge Luis Arzola, Gumersindo Pacheco, Atilio Caballero, Roberto Urías, Rolando Sánchez Mejías, Sergio Cevedo, Alberto Rodríguez Tosca and Ángel Santiesteban.

However, these writers only became established in the 1990s, a decade that gave rise to many authors: Alberto Guerra Naranjo, Alexis Díaz-Pimienta, David Mitrani Arenal, Alberto Garrandés, José Miguel Sánchez (Yoss), Verónica Pérez Kónina, Raúl Aguiar, Ricardo Arrieta, Ronaldo Menéndez, Eduardo del Llano, Michel Perdomo, Alejandro Álvarez, Daniel Díaz Mantilla, Ena Lucía Portela, Rita Martín, Waldo Pérez Cino, Antonio José Ponte, Karla Suárez, Jorge Ángel Pérez, Mylene Fernández Pintado, Adelaida Fernández de Juan, Anna Lidia Vega Serova, Gina Picart, Carlos Esquive Guerral, Félix Sánchez Rodríguez, Marcial Gala, Rogelio Riverón, Jorge Ángel Hernández, Lorenzo Lunar, Marco Antonio Calderón Echemendía, Antonio Rodríguez Salvador, Pedro de Jesús López, Luis Rafael Hernández, Michel Encinosa and Juan Ramón de la Portilla.

== Essays ==
Cuba has an important tradition of essay writing that began in the first half of the 19th century and includes many world-famous authors. Some of the most renowned essayists were Alejo Carpentier, José Lezama Lima, Guillermo Cabrera Infante, Ramiro Guerra, Emilio Roig de Leuchsenring, Cintio Vitier, Jorge Mañach, Graziella Pogolotti and Roberto Fernández Retamar.

Before 1959, essayists who stand out are the ethnographer Fernando Ortiz, author of works including Azúcar y Población de las Antillas (1927) and Contrapunteo cubano del tabaco y el azúcar (1940); Alberto Arredondo, author of works including El Negro en Cuba(1939) and Cuba, tierra indefensa(1945; Emilio Roig de Leuchsenring with works such as Cuba no debe su independencia a los Estados Unidos (1950); José Lezama Lima with Analecta del reloj (1953) and Tratados en La Habana (1958). Among many other writers of note are Jorge Mañach, Ramiro Guerra, Juan Marinello, Medardo Vitier, José Antonio Portuondo, Carlos Rafael Rodríguez, Raúl Roa and Faisel Iglesias.

During the second half of the 20th century and the beginning of the 21st, the development of essay writing accelerated, with dozens of writers cultivating the genre: Cintio Vitier, Fina García Marruz, Roberto Fernández Retamar, Roberto Friol, Rolando Pérez (Cuban poet), Ambrosio Fornet, Graziella Pogolotti, Adelaida de Juan, Rine Leal, Leonardo Acosta, Justo C. Ulloa, Enrico Mario Santi, Rafael Rojas, Jorge Luis Arcos, Enrique Sainz, Luis Álvarez, Raúl Hernández Novás, Virgilio López Lemus, Enrique Ubieta Gómez, Alberto Garrandés, Alberto Abreu Arcia, Roberto Zurbano, Beatriz Maggi, Emilio Ichikawa, Madeline Cámara, Rita Martín, Salvador Redonet-Cook, Vitalina Alfonso, and Amir Valle.

== Women's literature ==
=== Post-Revolution ===
After the Cuban Revolution of 1959, writers of all backgrounds were challenged by the material constraints that immediately took place. Supplies such paper and ink were difficult to come by, and the lack of materials was compounded by the lack of publishing and binding houses. Though such companies had existed within the private sector, at the time of the Revolution, these businesses were in the process of being nationalized by the new Cuban government. The result was that immediately after the Revolution, no Cuban publishing houses existed that were capable of sustainably carrying out the publishing and binding needs of the Cuban body of writers, though some were available to do “short runs” of several hundred copies. This may help to explain why women writers in Cuba experienced a publishing lull, though creatively and culturally encouraged through the establishment of Casa de Las Américas and Imprenta Nacional in 1959. Despite these challenges, the establishment of free education allowed for a drastically higher literacy rate, so writers had wider and more diverse audiences than ever before. Such developments are thought to contribute to the "boom" in women's writing that occurred in the 1970s, especially among younger women writers.

Cuban women writers have been able to change Cuban national discourse by reexamining themes that many people thought the Cuban Revolution of 1959 had put to rest. Their writing is diverse, and no one perspective, technique, or medium can be said to be characteristic of women's literature in Cuba. Poetry is by far the most widely used genre for Cuban women writers, followed by the short story, although they work within genres such as testimonial literature, autobiography, essay, and the novel as well. Their subject matter and treatment of such are exceptionally varied. They do, however, hold in common several themes especially prevalent in their works.

One such collection of themes is that of the social construction of motherhood, sexuality, and the female body. During the decades immediately following the Cuban Revolution, women were encouraged to embody ideals such as self-sufficiency and moral superiority as a mother figure. A growing trend in the depiction of motherhood is that of a mother and daughter pair alienated from one another, in which the writer rejects the assumption that a mother is perfect or that she is a symbol of home or nurturing love. Lina de Feria subverts the idea of the tender mother figure in her poem "Protected from the Years", in which the mother is a source of anxiety, and is someone whose accusations she must hide from to survive. Georgina Herrera speaks of a void between herself and her mother in "Mami", which scholar Catherine Davies characterizes as an overwhelming sense of "lack" surrounding the mother figure. Depictions range from merely distant to sometimes disparaging, but in doing so, these writers are asserting the freedom of the mother figure to be human, imperfect, and of her own free will or desire. This is not to say that all Cuban women writers illustrate mothers negatively—Nancy Morejon, for example, is known for her "matrilineal consciousness" which subverts the idea of the patriarchal male in its own right. She does this though her preference to trace ancestry and formation of identity through her mother, which reinforces a female solidarity.

Female eroticism in literature has been another tactic used to reinforce feminine subjectivity, even as early as the beginning of the 20th century, although the views of such literature, as well as the views expressed within it, have changed. Until as recently as the 1980s, topics such as female sexuality (especially if it was homosexual or happened outside of marriage) as well as female sexual desire were considered taboo. Women writers have attempted to empower themselves by expressing a woman's sexual desire, and showing her as an assertive and sometimes aggressive sexual partner. In Marilyn Bobes short story "Somebody Has to Cry", for which she won the 1995 Casa de las Américas Prize, differing points of view are utilized to discuss the stories of multiple characters. These characters deal with real problems, such as the tragedy of unwanted pregnancy from rape, or adultery. The story buzzes with sexual consciousness, focusing on women's views of their bodies, as well as the objectification that comes with beauty. Renowned poet Nancy Morejon is known for, among many other things, her depictions of lesbian love, further reorienting the perspective and asserting the right to agency.

Afro-Cuban women writers found their voices after the revolution, fueled by the national effort to define Cuban culture. An additional factor to their booming success was the increased access to greater educational opportunities than ever before for all Cubans through the free education system. These works often seek to subvert the traditional stereotypes toward mulatto women, especially the idea of the exotic, sexualized mulatta that dominated representations of mulatto women before the revolution. An especially famous example is that of the 19th-century character Cecilia Valdés from the novel of the same name, who is also known as "the little bronze virgin". She embodies sexuality and sensuality, as well as the perceived danger to marriages and families that might be damaged by her seductive ways. This has been combated by reorienting the perspective to that of the woman herself, which reinstates her subjectivity and denies such discourses that make her an object or commodity. Often the writer identifies sources of strength through cultural means, such as in the poem "Ofumelli" by Excilia Saldaña, in which a mulatto woman, prized as a sexual object, is able to fall back on her Lucumi religion as a source of power, and rains down curses against her oppressor.

Another theme throughout AfroCuban women's literature is the idea of the African motherland. Mother Africa is sometimes depicted as a physical mother figure, such as Minerva Salado’s poem "Song of the Acana Tree" in which the author expresses kinship with Africa. With other writers, such as poet Nancy Morejon, mother Africa represents what Mirar Adentro calls the "theme of origin". From this second perspective, Cuba is the homeland, and Africa is the historical root that helps to explain identity. A consciousness of the past, including African heritage and slavery, are part of the construction of character today, which is often expressed by Morejon's poetry. Two famous examples of such poetry by Morejon are "Black Woman" and "I Love My Master", which illustrate traits that are characteristic of Morejon's poetry: they call upon historical events and collective experiences to help establish identity as an AfroCuban and as a woman. Though such themes are prevalent among black and mulatta women writers, even white female writers often focus on themes of Africa and African cultural roots—Minerva Salado is one example. Some have explained this unique characteristic of Cuban literature as stemming from the fact that Cuban national culture is a transcultured one, in which neither the Spanish or African cultural elements are dominated or eliminated, but instead combined into a cohesive new culture. This unique characteristic allows non-black Cuban women to identify with the themes of AfroCuban women, and Davies argues that the real question is simply to what extent each author identifies with Africa and how she identifies herself as a Cuban.

The Special Period that began in the 1990s posed a considerable challenge to Cuban women writers. Paper and materials were scarce, and dwindling housing opportunities meant that many Cuban women had little personal space in which to write, as many lived in often cramped multi-generational homes. Hand-made “plaquettes” have helped to keep women's literature afloat until joint publishing ventures could accommodate the needs of writers. Many Cuban writers endeavored to publish in other countries, such as France and Mexico. Despite serious setbacks, Cuban women writers have continued to write, develop, and go on to win national and international claim, including the National Critics Prize and the Casa de las Américas Prize.

== Children's literature ==
Literature written for children and young readers in Cuba started around the beginning of the 19th century. In the works of two poets, José Manuel Zequeira and José María Heredia, lyrical elements identified with this genre can be found, while Heredia's El ruiseñor, el príncipe y el ayo was written completely for children.

Others children's writers of the century include Cirilo Villaverde with El librito de los cuentos y las conversaviones (1847), Eusebio Guiteras Fonts with his reading books used as official texts in elementary education, and Francisco Javier Balmaceda with Fábulas morales (1861). However, in the 19th century, the genre gained momentous value only with the works of José Martí and primarily his collection of poems entitled Ismaelillo (1882), besides other poems and short stories published in the magazine La edad de oro (1889).

Literature for children and young people continued to be written in the first half of the 20th century. To this period belong Dulce María Borrero and her Cantos escolares, Emilio Bacardí Moreu with Cuentos de todas las noches (published posthumously in 1950), René Potts with Romancero de la maestrilla (1936) and Emma Pérez Téllez with Niña y el viento de mañana (1938) and Isla con sol (1945). However, the most prominence was achieved by Hilda Perera Soto with Cuentos de Apolo (1947), a central work within children's literature in Cuba.

The 1940s also saw Raúl Ferrer and his Romancillo de las cosas negras y otras poemas. Dora Alonso became known in the 1950s, especially with the play Pelusín del Monte, named after the main character, a puppet that went on to become a national icon.

Two important authors appeared in the 1970s: Renee Méndez Capote, who wrote Memorias de una cubanita que nació con el siglo (1963), and Herminio Almendros with Otros viejos (1965) and Había una vez (1968).

Two paradigmatic books published in 1974 were Juegos y otros poemas by Mirta Aguirre and Caballito Blanco (short stories) by Onelio Jorge Cardoso. Afterward, other essential works were published, such as Por el mar de las Antillas anda un barco de papel (1978) by Nicolás Guillén, Palomar (1979) by Dora Alonso, El libro de Gabriela (1985) by Adolfo Martí Fuentes, Rueda la ronda (1985) by David Chericián, Soñar despierto (1988) by Eliseo Diego and La noche (1989) by Excilia Saldaña.

At present, Cuban children's literature has broadened and includes many others, such as Antonio Orlando Rodríguez, José Manuel Espino, Aramís Quintero, Ivette Vian, Enid Vian, Emilio de Armas, Deysi Valls, Joel Franz Rosell, Julia Calzadilla, Julio M. Llanes, Freddy Artiles, Enrique Pérez Díaz, Alfonso Silva Lee, Luis Cabrera Delgado, René Fernández Santana, Emma Romeu, Nelson Simón, Ramón Luis Herrera, Froilán Escobar, Esther Suárez, José Antonio Gutiérrez Caballero, Omar Felipe Mauri, Niurki Pérez García, Mildre Hernández Barrios, Nersys Felipe, Luis Rafael Hernández, Teresa Cárdenas Angulo, Luis Caissés and Magali Sánchez.

== Afrocubanismo ==
During the 1920s and 1930s Cuba experienced a movement geared towards Afro-Cuban culture called Afrocubanismo. The beauty of Afrocubanismo in literature is that is captures something indispensably Cuban. It incorporates the islanders’ African roots while mixing it with their own creativity to produce something that is truly magical. They have all grown up with rhythm as a daily part of their life, so the incorporation of rhythm into literature was a rather smooth transition.

The idea of introducing rhythm into literature was brought about by several Cuban composers who were also writers. Alejandro García Caturla, Amadeo Roldán, and Gilberto Valdés were all interested in supporting black culture as well as adding musical elements to written word. Composers Eliseo and Emilio Grenet also established a bridge between the literature and the music of the afrocubanismo movement. Using onomatopoeia, the goal of rhythmic literature is to get the reader to experience the reading like a dance without using actual instruments. Afro-Cuban music genres such as the rumba, afro and son were particularly important during the afrocubanismo movement. The claves, a percussion instrument, was the main inspiration for incorporating rhythm within Cuban literature. It sounds very different from Western percussion rhythm and was a way to introduce African rhythm into art. These characteristics of the clave and the importance of dance to the Cuban people became a catalyst for integrating musical patterns into their literature, especially within poetry.

== See also ==
- List of Cuban writers
- List of newspapers in Cuba
- Cuban American literature
- Latin American literature
