= Chiquititas (disambiguation) =

Chiquititas is an Argentine children's musical telenovela

Chiquititas can also refer to:

- Chiquititas (1997 Brazilian TV series), a 1997 Brazilian version of the Argentine telenovela Chiquititas
- Chiquititas (Mexican TV series), a 1998 Mexican telenovela based on the Argentine telenovela Chiquititas
- Chiquititas: Rincón de luz, a 2001 Argentine fantasy-adventure film based on the Argentine telenovela Chiquititas
- Chiquititas (Portuguese TV series), a 2007 Portuguese telenovela based on the Argentine series Chiquititas Sin Fin
- Chiquititas (2013 Brazilian TV series), a 2013 remake of the 1997 Brazilian telenovela (that was based on the Argentine original)

== See also ==
- Chiquititas soundtracks, the various telenovela soundtracks
- Chiquitita (album), Menudo's third Spanish album
- "Chiquitita", a song by ABBA
- Chiquitita (drag artist), drag performance artist and seamstress
- Chiquita (disambiguation)
