= Serafina Núñez =

Cuban teacher and poet (1913–2006)

- Born: 1913 Havana
- Died: June 2006 (aged 92–93)
- Genre: poetry

Mercedes Serafina Núñez de Villavicencio y Ortiz (better known as Serafina Núñez; 14 August 1913 – June 2006) was a Cuban teacher and poet who first gained recognition in the 1930s. During her literary life, she was a contemporary of Alfonso Reyes, Gabriela Mistral and Juan Ramón Jiménez, as well as other women poets of this era such as Emilia Bernal, Dulce Maria Loynaz, Carilda Oliver Labra and Rafaela Chacón Nardi.

== Life ==
Serafina Núñez was born in Havana, Cuba, on 14 August 1913. She graduated as a normalist teacher in Havana in 1936 and then began her studies in pedagogy at the University of Havana in 1949, ending in the third year when she began working as a primary school teacher until 1969. Núñez was first published in 1936, when her work was included in Juan Ramón Jiménez's anthology Antología de la Poesía Cubana en 1936, and he maintained a friendship with Núñez the rest of his life, to the point of defraying the expense of publishing Mar Cautiva (1937), and Vigilia y Secreto (1942). It would be more than 30 years before she published again in 1992. In 2001, she visited Miami as a guest at the International Book Fair. She died in June 2006 at the age of 92 years.

== Selected works ==
- 1936: Antología de la Poesía Cubana en 1936
- 1937: Mar Cautiva
- 1938: Isla en el sueño
- 1942: Vigilia y Secreto
- 1956: Paisaje y Elegía
- 1994: Vitral del tiempo – Premio Nacional de Crítica Literaria (National Critics Prize)
- 1995: Moradas para la vida
- 1996: Porque es vivir un testimonio raro
- 1999: En las serenas márgenes
- 2000: Antología cósmica de Serafina Núñez
- 2000: Rosa de mi mansedumbre
- 2001: El herido diamante
- 2002: Cancioncillas
- 2003: Penélope
- 2004: Tierra de secreta transparencia
- 2007: Mar Cautiva. Edición fascimilar
