= Chiquita (disambiguation) =

Chiquita is an American large produce company.

Chiquita may also refer to:

== Literature ==
- Chiquita, a novel about the life of Espiridiona Cenda, written by Antonio Orlando Rodríguez 1998

== Music ==
- "Chiquita", a song by Sam H. Stept
- "Chiquita", a song by Aerosmith from Night in the Ruts
- "Chiquita", a song by Rocket Punch
- Chiquitas (song), a song by Ilona Mitrecey

== People ==
- Chiquita Barreto (born 1947), Paraguayan writer
- Chiquita Brooks-LaSure, American healthcare policy official
- Espiridiona Cenda (1869–1945), Cuban dwarf dancer and singer
- Humberto González (born 1966), Mexican professional boxer
- Delia Gonzalez (born 1971), American female professional boxer
- Chiquita (singer), member of South Korean girl group BabyMonster

== Place ==
- Chiquita River, located in Táchira, Venezuela

== See also ==
- "Chiquitita", a single by ABBA
- Chicquita, a racehorse
