= Odette Alonso =

Cuban writer

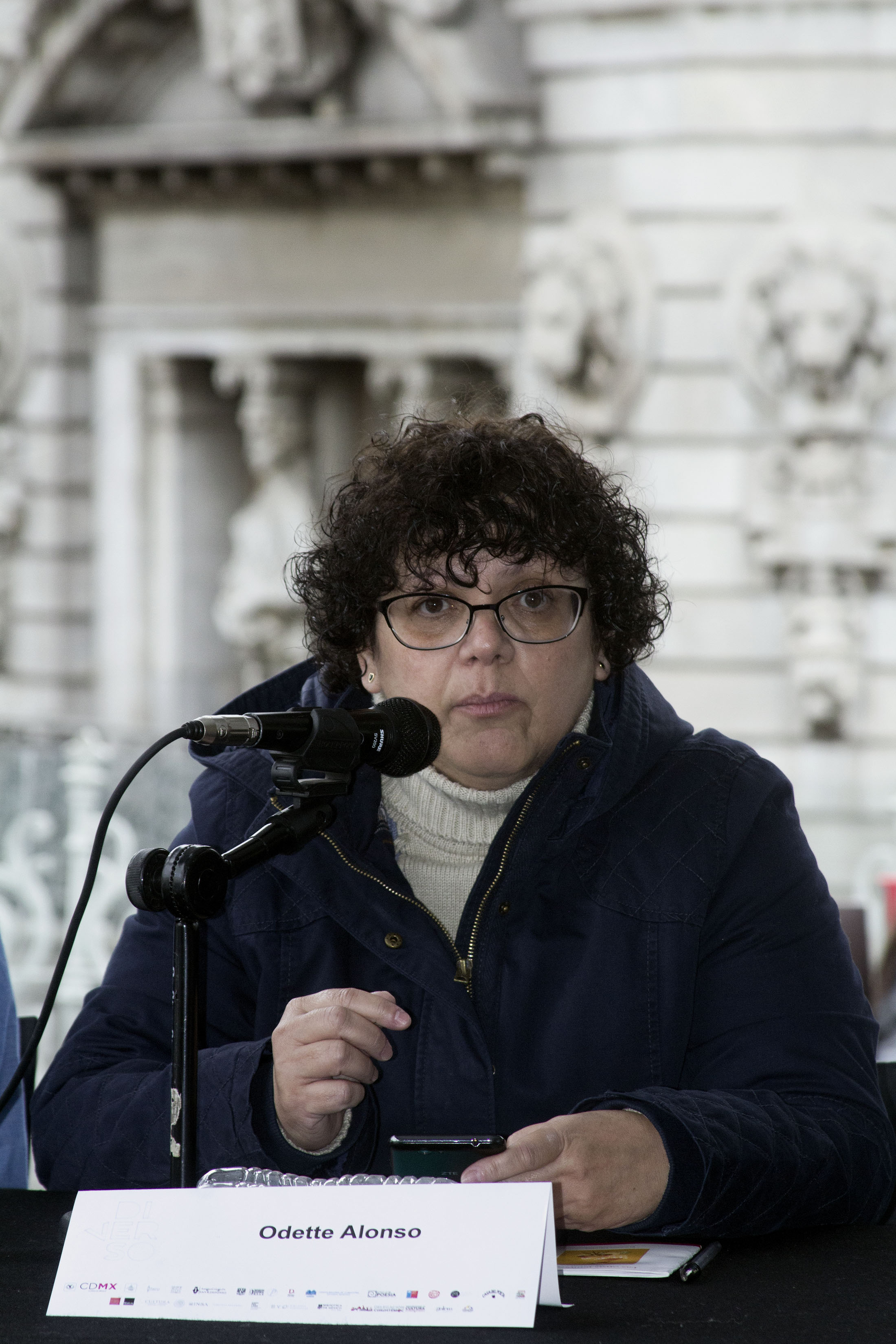
Odette Alonso on a reading of her poems in Mexico City on 2016.

Odette Alonso (born 1964) is a poet, storyteller, essayist, and promoter of Cuban literature. She has a degree in philology. She currently lives in Mexico, where she has resided since 1992.

== Biography ==
Odette was born in Santiago de Cuba in 1964. She is a member of the Network of Female Latin American Writers (Red de Escritoras Latinoamericas [RELAT]), the Writers' and Artists' Union of Cuba (Unión de Escritores y Artistas de Cuba), and the Union of Women Writers of the Antilles (Unión de Mujeres Escritoras de las Antillas [UMEDA]). Currently, she is an editor of the Dirección de Publicaciones of the Universidad Autónoma de México (UNAM).

She has published a book of short stories Con la boca abierta in Spain in 2006 and the novel Espejo de tres cuerpos in Mexico through Quimera Ediciones in 2009. She is the compiler of a poetry anthology called Las cuatro puntas del pañuelo. Her project "Poetas cubanos de la diáspora" won one of the prizes of the 2003 Cuban Artists Fund in New York City. It was published under the title Antología de la poesía cubana del exilio by Aduana Vieja Editorial in Valencia in 2011.

== Works ==
Poetry collections

- Enigma de la sed, Cuba, 1989.
- Historias para el desayuno, Cuba, 1989 (Prize "Adelaida del Mármol" 1989).
- Palabra del que vuelve, Cuba, 1996 (Prize "Pinos Nuevos," poetry 1996).
- Linternas, New York City, 1997.
- Visiones, Mexico, 2000.
- Insomnios en la noche del espejo, Mexico, 2000 (Premio Internacional de Poesía "Nicolás Guillén", Mexico, 1999).
- Antología cósmica de Odette Alonso, Mexico, 2001.
- Diario del caminante, Mexico, 2002.
- Cuando la lluvia cesa, Spain, 2003.
- El levísimo ruido de sus pasos, Spain, 2005.
- Escombros del alma, France, 2011
- Manuscrito hallado en alta mar, Mexico, 2011

== Prizes and recognition ==
- Premio "Adelaida del Mármol", Cuba, 1989.
- Premio Pinos Nuevos de Poesía, Cuba, 1996.
- Premio Internacional de Poesía "Nicolás Guillén", Mexico, 1999.
- Cuban Artists Fund, New York City, 2003.
