= José Lezama Lima =

Cuban writer, poet

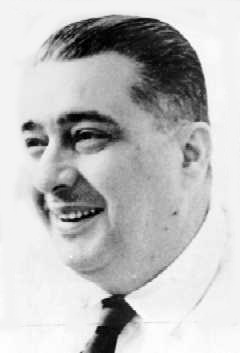
- From the collection of Eloisa Lezama-Lima and her book "Una Familia Habanera"
- Born: December 19, 1910; Havana, Cuba
- Died: August 9, 1976 (aged 65); Havana, Cuba
- Education: University of Havana
- Occupations: Novelist, poet, essayist, lawyer
- Writing career
- Language: Spanish
- Notable work: Paradiso (1966)
- Literary movement: American Neo-Baroque

José María Andrés Fernando Lezama Lima (December 19, 1910 – August 9, 1976) was a Cuban writer, poet and essayist. He is considered one of the most influential figures in Cuban and Latin American literature. His novel Paradiso is one of the most important works in Spanish and one of the best novels of the 20th Century according to the Spanish newspaper El Mundo.

Lezama is a prominent referent of American Neo-Baroque literature. He created a mature poetic system characterized by its lyricism. His work features a wide variety of metaphors, allusions and allegories which he developed in essays such as Analecta del reloj (1953), La expresión americana (1957), Tratados en La Habana (1958) o La cantidad hechizada (1970).

== Biography ==
Born in the Columbia Military Encampment close to Havana in the city of Marianao where his father was a colonel, Lezama lived through some of the most turbulent times of Cuba's history, fighting against the Machado dictatorship. His literary output includes the semi-autobiographical, baroque novel Paradiso (1966), the story of a young man and his struggles with his mysterious illness, the death of his father, and his developing sensuality and poetic sensibilities. Lezama Lima also edited several anthologies of Cuban poetry and the magazines Verbum and Orígenes, presiding as the patriarch of Cuban letters for most of his later years.

Lezama Lima spent little time outside of his home country, making a trip to Mexico in 1949 and Jamaica in 1950). Nevertheless, Lezama's poetry, essays and two novels draw images and ideas from a vast array of world cultures and historical time periods. The Baroque style that he forged relied equally upon his Góngora-influenced syntax and his stunning constellations of unlikely images, which often drew from Ancient Chinese and Egyptian philosophical texts and mythological narratives. Lezama Lima's first published work, the long poem "Muerte de Narciso," brought him national acclaim at the age of twenty-seven and established his well-wrought style and classical subject matter.

In addition to his poems and novels, Lezama wrote many essays on figures of world literature such as Stéphane Mallarmé, Valéry, Góngora and Rimbaud as well as on Latin American baroque aesthetics. Most notably the essays published as La Expresión Americana lay out his vision of the European baroque, its relation to the classical, and the American baroque.

Lezama Lima died in 1976 at age 65 and was buried in the Colon Cemetery, Havana. He was influential for Cuban and Puerto Rican writers of his generation and the next, such as Virgilio Piñera, Reinaldo Arenas, Fernando Velázquez Medina, René Marqués, and Giannina Braschi, who depict his life and works in their writing.

== Works ==
=== Poetry ===
- Muerte de Narciso (1937)
- Enemigo rumor (1941)
- Aventuras sigilosas (1945)
- La fijeza (1949)
- Dador (1960)
- Fragmentos a su imán (1978)

=== Novels ===
- Paradiso (1966)
- Oppiano Licario (1977)

=== Essays ===
- Analecta del reloj (1953)
- La expresión americana (1957)
- Tratados en La Habana (1958)
- La cantidad hechizada (1970)

== See also ==
- Cuban literature
- Puerto Rican literature
- Caribbean literature
