= Paradiso (novel) =

1966 novel by José Lezama Lima

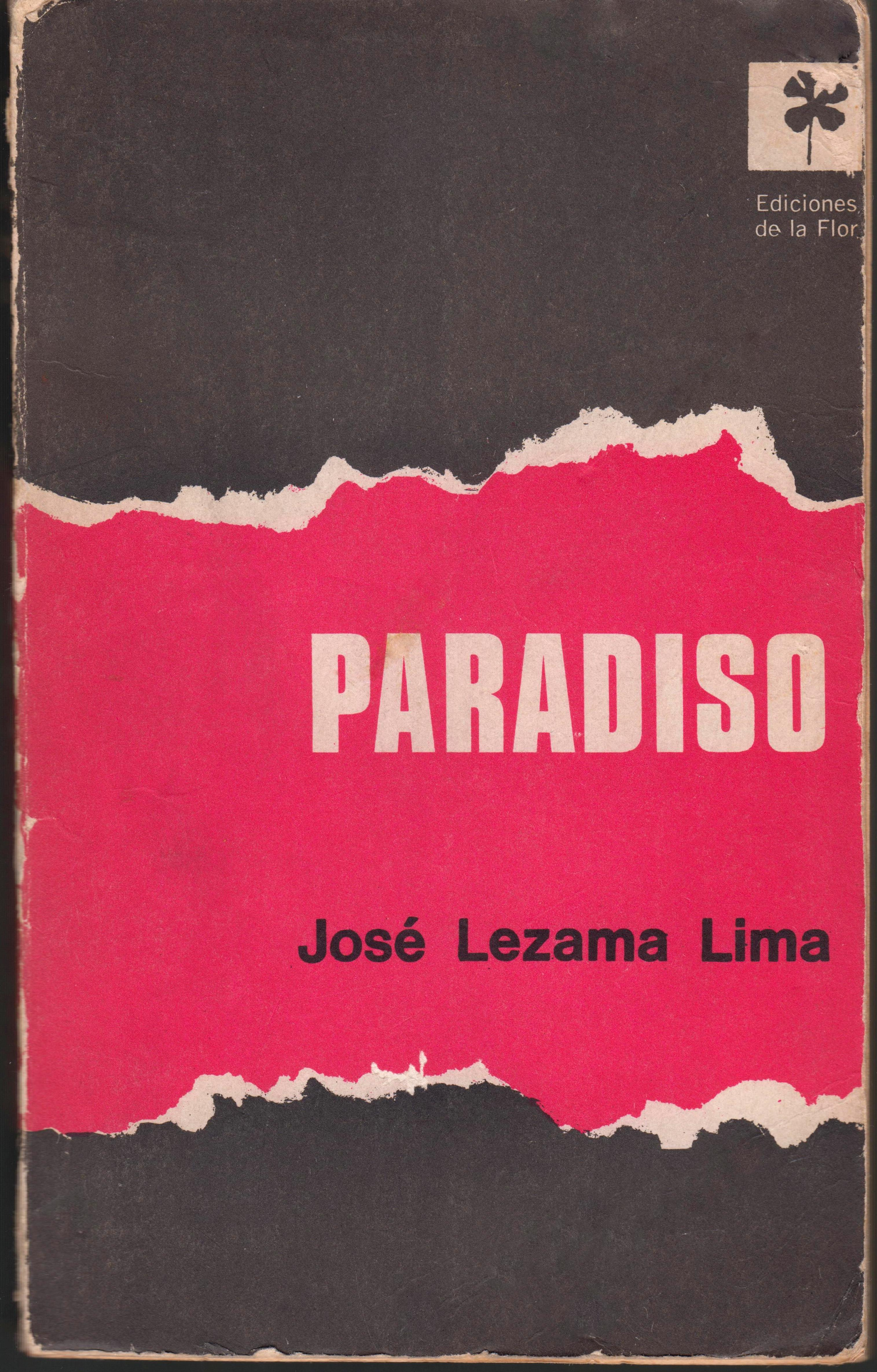
- 1968 edition printed in Argentina.
- Author: José Lezama Lima
- Language: Spanish
- Publication date: 1966
- Publication place: Cuba

Paradiso is a novel by Cuban writer José Lezama Lima, the only one completed and published during his lifetime. Written in an elaborately baroque style, the narrative follows the childhood and youth of José Cemí, and depicts many scenes which resonate with Lezama's own life as a young poet in Havana. Many of the characters reappear in Lezama's posthumous novel Oppiano Licario, which was published in Mexico in 1977.

== Background ==
The novel was originally published in Cuba in an edition regarded by the Argentine writer Julio Cortázar as being highly unsatisfactory, in part because of Lezama's poor punctuation and stylistic errors. With Lezama's blessing, Cortázar personally edited the text for a subsequent Mexican edition, correcting "thousands of errors and ambiguities."

Despite having written one of the most accomplished novels in Cuba's history, Lezama said he never considered himself a novelist, but rather a poet who wrote a poem that became a novel. Paradiso can thus be considered a kind of long poem, just as well as a neo-baroque novel.

== Plot ==
The novel relates Cemí's struggles with a mysterious childhood illness, describes the death of his father, and explores his homosexuality and literary sensibilities. He lives in the world of pre-Castro Havana, and the Cuban Revolution only appears as a secondary plot. Some of the later chapters incorporate narrative experiments in which several alternating stories, set during widely divergent eras and having no immediately apparent connection with José Cemí, are interwoven and eventually merged. (In a letter to Julio Cortázar, Lezama explained that these chapters represent Cemí's dreams after the death of his father.)

== Controversy ==
Because of the graphic homosexual scenes and the novel's ambivalence towards the political situation of the day, Paradiso encountered controversy and publication problems. Today it is widely read in the Spanish-speaking world but has not achieved the same fame in English-speaking countries despite a translation by the American translator Gregory Rabassa.
