= Damaris Calderón =

Cuban poet

- Born: 1967 (age 58–59); Havana, Cuba
- Education: University of Havana; Metropolitan University of Educational Sciences (master deegee)
- Occupation: Poet
- Employer: Finis Terrae University
- Awards: Guggenheim Fellowship (2011)

Damaris Calderón Campos (born 1967) is a Cuban poet based in Chile. She has won several awards for her poetry work, including the 1998 Premio Revista de Libros and a 2011 Guggenheim Fellowship, and she is a professor at Finis Terrae University.

== Biography ==
Damaris Calderón Campos was born in 1967 in Havana, and she graduated from the University of Havana. She started writing several poetry collections - Con el terror del quilibrista (1988), Duras aguas del trópico (1992), Duro de roer (1992), and Guijarros (1994), some on which were, according to Carmen Alemany Bay, part of a trend "questioning of the idea of a revolutionary nation" like Cuba amidst the dissolution of the Soviet Union.

She then moved to Chile in 1995, and she was educated at the Metropolitan University of Educational Sciences, where she got her master's degree in classical languages and culture. She then resumed her career in poetry collections, publishing Babosas: dejando mi propio rastro in 1998 and Se adivina un país in 1999. In 1999, she won the Premio Revista de Libros for her poetry collection Sílabas. Ecce Homo. Five of her poems were part of Mark Weiss' 2009 book The Whole Island: Six Decades of Cuban Poetry. In 2011, she was awarded a Guggenheim Fellowship in Poetry. In 2014, she won the Consejo Nacional del Libro y la Lectura Award for Best Published Literary Work in Poetry for her collection Las pulsaciones de la ataque.

She began teaching at the Finis Terrae University, where she later became professor. Together with María Elena Hernandez Caballero, she founded and became director of publishing house Las Dos Fridas. Additionally, she once had an anthology of modern Chilean poetry under her editorship, Cercados por las aguas.
