= Chely Lima =

Cuban writer

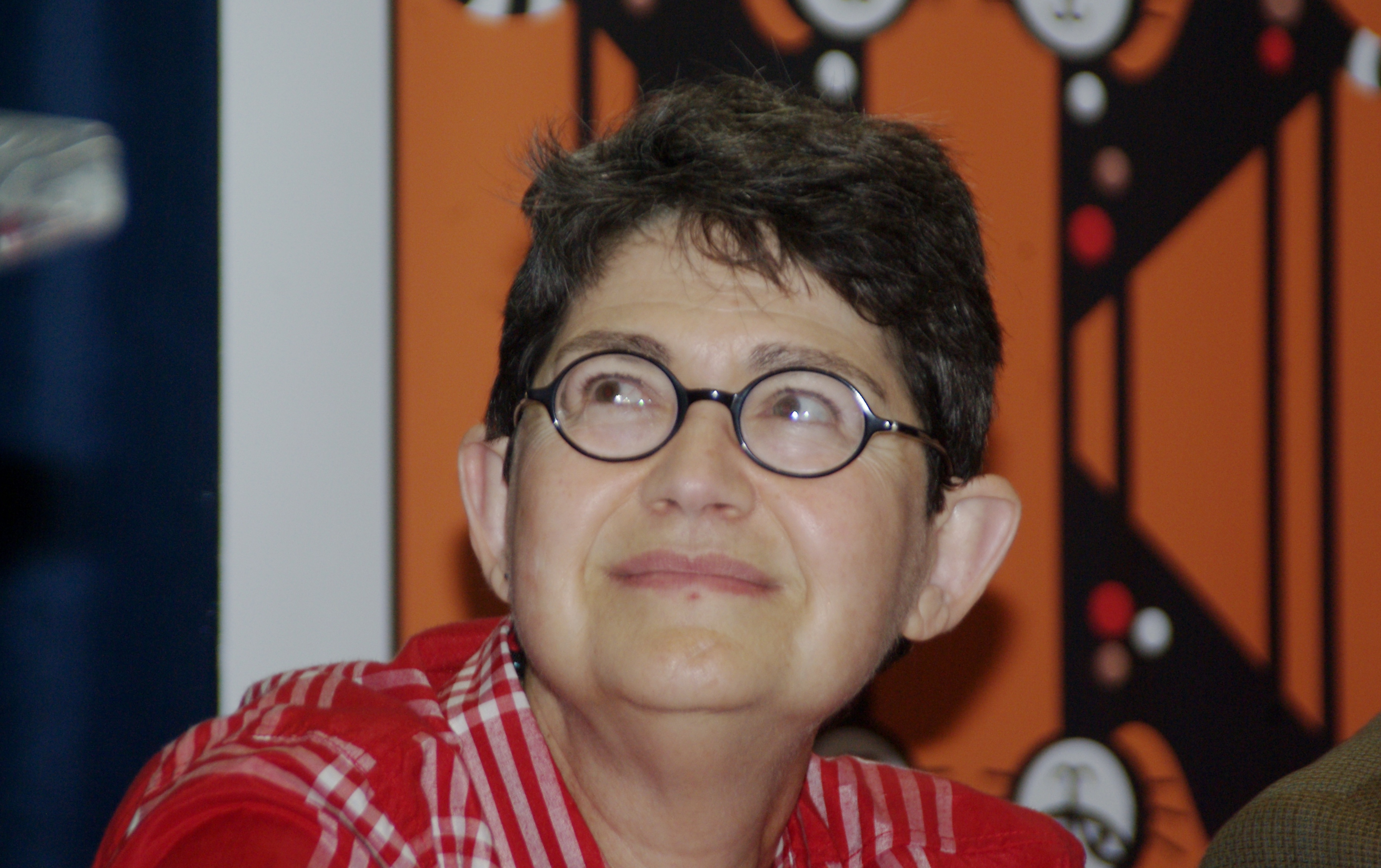
The Cuban writer Chely Lima at the Miami Book Fair International in 2014.

Chely Lima (1957 – January 21, 2023) was a Cuban American LGBT writer of novels, poetry, and plays, as well as a photographer, editor, and screenwriter.

== Biography ==
Lima was born in Havana, Cuba, in 1957. His father was a doctor, and he had several half-siblings. He was educated in his native city, including studying Japanese at the Instituto de Idiomas Máximo Gorki in Miramar.

In 1978 he began to work in the offices of the Instituto Cubano del Arte e Industria Cinematográficos, and the following year he began to work in radio, writing for a musical and news show.

In 1979 he met the writer Alberto Serret, who became his husband and collaborator on many literary and artistic projects. The couple worked so closely together, "It's not possible for me to delineate Chely and Alberto," their longtime friend and fellow poet Sigfredo Ariel said.

The following year, the two moved to Isla de la Juventud, where Lima worked with a children's theater group and as a literary advisor. He also began working as an editor of a literary magazine.

His first book of poems, Tiempo nuestro, was released in 1981, after having won the University of Havana's 13 de Marzo Prize the previous year. The next year he published a book of stories, Monólogo con lluvia, which had also been recognized in 1980 with the David Prize.

Lima published his first works of science fiction in the 1983 book Espacio abierto, written in collaboration with Serret, with whom he also wrote his first work of theater, Retratos, which was published the following year.

In 1986 he began to write TV scripts for the series Del lado del corazón, also with Serret. The following year the couple premiered Violente, the very first Cuban rock opera.

He received the 13 de Marzo prize again in 1987 for his children's book El barrio de los elefantes. In that same year he also wrote the TV series Hoy es siempre todavía in collaboration with Serret, Daína Chaviano, and Antonio Orlando Rodríguez, which also received several prizes.

In 1990 he published his first work of crime fiction, the book of stories Los asesinos las prefieren rubias, again co-authored with Serret. The couple also released the cantata Señor de la alborada that year. The following year, Lima published his first novel, Brujas.

In February of that year, Lima moved to Ecuador with his partner, where he worked on a variety of projects including for TV and radio. He worked as an editor for the Ecuadorean newspapers Hoy, El Comercio, and La Hora. He also taught classes and workshops at the Pontifical Catholic University of Ecuador, Universidad Católica de Santiago de Guayaquil, and other institutions.

He published his novels Confesiones nocturnas and Triángulos mágicos in Mexico in 1994. That year he also began to work for the Ecuadorian national TV channel Ecuavisa, for which he co-wrote with Serret the miniseries El Chulla Romero y Flores (1995), 7 lunas, 7 serpientes (1996), and Solo de guitarra (1997). From 1997 until 2003 he worked as part of the writing team for the series Pasado y confeso. In 1998, Lima won the Juan Rulfo Prize for Children's Literature for his story El cerdito que amaba el ballet.

After 22 years of partnership, Serret died of a heart attack in 2001. Lima remained in Ecuador for a few more years and immersed himself in various projects, including the script for the play Tres historias de hotel, which premiered in Quito in 2001.

Lima moved to Buenos Aires in 2003, where he stayed for a few years. There, he joined the writing team for the telenovela Yo vendo unos ojos negros, taught scriptwriting classes, and in 2006 wrote, along with José Zambrano Brito, the script for a film adaptation of Lima's unpublished novel Filo de amor.

In late 2006, Lima moved to the United States, settling first in San Francisco, where he completed an internship at the De Young Museum. In 2007 he began working in photography. The following year he moved to Miami, where he resided and taught creative writing and screenwriting workshops at Miami-Dade College and other institutions.

He died in Miami, Florida, in 2023 at age 66.

Lima was transgender, and his work touched on sexuality, gender identity, and how social conventions can impede individual freedoms. Although Lima publicly came out as trans later in life, he told an interviewer in 2016 that, "In my case, for my close friends—at least those with whom I could be honest—and for the people with whom I've lived as a couple, it was never a secret that I have always been a man. I have tried to dress as such since age 20, always fighting against the prejudices and attacks, veiled and unveiled, from society."

== Works ==
=== Poetry ===
- 2017: What the Werewolf told them – Lo que les dijo el licántropo. Translated by Margaret Randall.
- 2013: Discurso de la amante
- 2011: Todo aquello que no se dice
- 2004: Zona de silencio
- 1992: Rock sucio
- 1989: Terriblemente iluminados
- 1981: Tiempo Nuestro

=== Fiction ===
- 2016: Triángulos mágicos
- 2015: Lucrecia quiere decir perfidia
- 2014: Triángulos mágicos
- 2014: Memorias del tiempo circular
- 2010: Lucrecia quiere decir perfidia (novel)
- 2010: Isla después del diluvio (novel)
- 1994: Confesiones nocturnas (novel)
- 1994: Triángulos mágicos (novel)
- 1993: Los hijos de Adán (stories)
- 1991: Brujas (novel)
- 1990: La desnudez y el alba (two novellas, co-authored with Alberto Serret)
- 1990: Los asesinos las prefieren rubias (crime stories, co-authored with Alberto Serret)
- 1983: Espacio abierto (science fiction stories, co-authored with Alberto Serret)
- 1982: Monólogo con lluvia (stories)

=== Juvenile fiction ===
- 2010: El planeta de los papás-bebés (story, co-authored with Sergio Andricaín)
- 2006: Abuela Trina y Marrasquina van a la ciudad (story)
- 2000: El jardín de los seres fantásticos (vignettes)
- 1998: El cerdito que amaba el ballet (story, Juan Rulfo Prize-winner)
- 1997: La tarde en que encontramos un hada (stories)
- 1987: El barrio de los elefantes (stories)

=== Theater ===
- 2001: Tres historias de hotel
- 1992: Un plato de col agria (written with Alberto Serret)
- 1990: Señor de la alborada (cantata, written with Alberto Serret)
- 1987: Violente (rock opera, written with Alberto Serret)
- 1984: Sicotíteres (six short plays for children's theater, written with Alberto Serret)
- 1984: Retratos (written with Alberto Serret)

=== Film, television, and radio ===
- 2006: Filo de amor (written with José Zambrano Brito).
- 2003: Yo vendo unos ojos negros (under the direction of Ana Montes)
- 2001: Programa de Literatura (written with Mercedes Falconí)
- 1997: Solo de guitarra (written with Alberto Serret)
- 1997–2002: Pasado y confeso (in collaboration with Alberto Serret)
- 1995: Siete lunas, siete serpientes (written with Alberto Serret)
- 1994: Sección New Age del Programa Familia
- 1994: El chulla Romero y Flores (written with Alberto Serret)
- 1993: Tu nombre es Mujer (written with Alberto Serret)
- 1991–92: No hacen falta alas (written with Alberto Serret)
- 1990: Shiralad o el regreso de los dioses (written with Alberto Serret)
- 1990: Castillo de cristal (written with Alberto Serret)
- 1989: Solteronas en el atardecer (written with Alberto Serret and Guillermo Torres)
- 1987: Hoy es siempre todavía (written with Alberto Serret, Daína Chaviano, and Antonio Orlando Rodríguez)
- 1987: Que viva el disparate (written with Alberto Serret, Daína Chaviano, and Antonio Orlando Rodríguez)
- 1986: Del lado del corazón (written with Alberto Serret)
- 1982–83: Cuentos de Pepe Toronja (radio libretto)
- 1979: Programa Musical de la EGREM (radio libretto)
