= Antonio Rodríguez Salvador =

Cuban writer

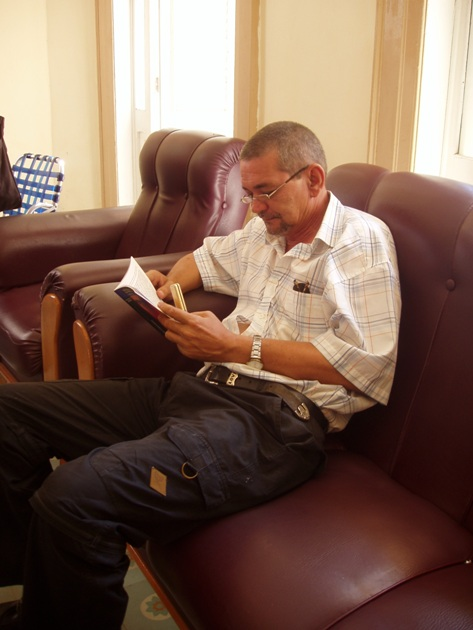
- Born: December 22, 1960; Taguasco, Cuba
- Occupation: Novelist, poet, Short story writer, essayist, dramatist, columnist
- Period: 20th century
- Genre: Hispanoamerican Literature

Antonio Rodríguez Salvador (born December 22, 1960), is a poet, fiction writer, dramatist and essayist.

Salvador was born Taguasco, Cuba. He received a degree in economics, but teaches Composition and Style at José Martí University, and Drama at Silverio Blanco Pedagogical College, in Sancti Spiritus. He is regarded as one of the outstanding voices in present Latin American fiction.

He is defined by a great linguistic cleanliness which sums up in the field of prose his poetic gains and a mythical halo when dealing (evaluating, incisively) with reality, his narrative skills bring up interesting variables within the fable tendency, mature while they represent the consolidation of a very personalized "modus operandi" around certain thematic areas taken up by other authors that represent such trend. Absurdity is seen as another detail of "real" life that takes place within the work of art, closely associated with a burlesque-philosophical point of view when assuming that life; it does not appear as a fact of amazement or astonishment or fear (which commonly illustrate the work of other representatives of that tendency) but as a part of that whole which is narrated in equality of conditions.

== Works ==
He has published the following books:

- Oficio de caminante (poetry) Editorial Capitán San Luis, Havana, 1991
- Quiero que me desanudes (poetry) Editorial Luminaria, Sancti Spiritus, 1992
- En un sombrero de mago (poetry) Editorial Luminaria, Sancti Spiritus, 1993
- Hágase un solitario (short stories) Fundación de la Ciudad de Santa Clara Award. Editorial Capiro, Santa Clara, 1996 Editorial Capiro, Santa Clara, 1996
- Rolandos (novel) International Novel Award "Salvador García Aguilar", Rojales, Alicante, Spain. Olalla Ediciones, Madrid, 1997; Editorial Letras Cubanas, Havana, 1998; Editorial Caminho, Lisbon, 2000.
- Sueño a cuatro manos (novel) Editorial Globo , Tenerife, 2002.
- Espejo del solitario (poetry) Editorial Luminaria, Sancti Spiritus, 2002.
- Pato de bodas (drama for children) Editorial Luminaria, Sancti Spiritus, 2005.

Some of his works have been included in many anthologies published in various countries. The most representative are:

- Líneas aéreas. Narradores latinoamericanos. Editorial Lengua de Trapo, Madrid, 1999.
- De Cuba te cuento. Narradores cubanos. Editorial Plaza Mayor, Puerto Rico, 2002.
- Que caí bajo la noche (poetry). 200 años de décima erótica en Cuba. Editorial Ávila, Ciego de Ávila, 2004.

His chronicles and essays, some of them awarded important prizes, appear periodically in his author column Fe de Erratas of Cubaliteraria, the Portal of Cuban Literature.

== Biographical information ==
He was born on December 22 in Taguasco, Sancti Spiritus province, Cuba. His father, Joaquín Antonio Rodríguez Castro, was also a writer, and his work, which was acknowledged by the critics, was collected in the book Flor de campanillas, published in 1950, and in diverse anthologies, such as 200 años del soneto en Cuba. He studied through his bachelor year in a military school, and obtained his degree in Economics from Universidad Central de Las Villas in 1983. He excelled in sports: he was the college chess national champion in 1979, and obtained the best score for a top board in the first division national championship of correspondence chess in 1985.

From 1987 to 1995 he was the economic director of the most important paper mill in Cuba, and in 1990 he was assigned commercial duties in the Soviet Union. From 1995 to 1997 he was one of the main managers of the national paper industry in Cuba, until his novel Rolandos obtained two literary awards in Spain, and he decided to leave Economics for a full-time writer career. He is a member of the Union of Writers and Artists of Cuba since 1993. From 1999 to 2002 he was the director of Editorial Luminaria. In 2000 he has distinguished with the Personality of the Culture Award, and in 2005 he was acknowledged as Illustrious Member of the Hermanos Saíz Association, an organization of young writers and artists of Cuba. En 1997 he received the city shield of Rojales, Alicante, Spain. He currently resides in Jatibonico, Sancti Spiritus, Cuba.

== See also ==
- Cuban literature
- List of Cubans
