= Jorge Enrique González Pacheco =

American poet

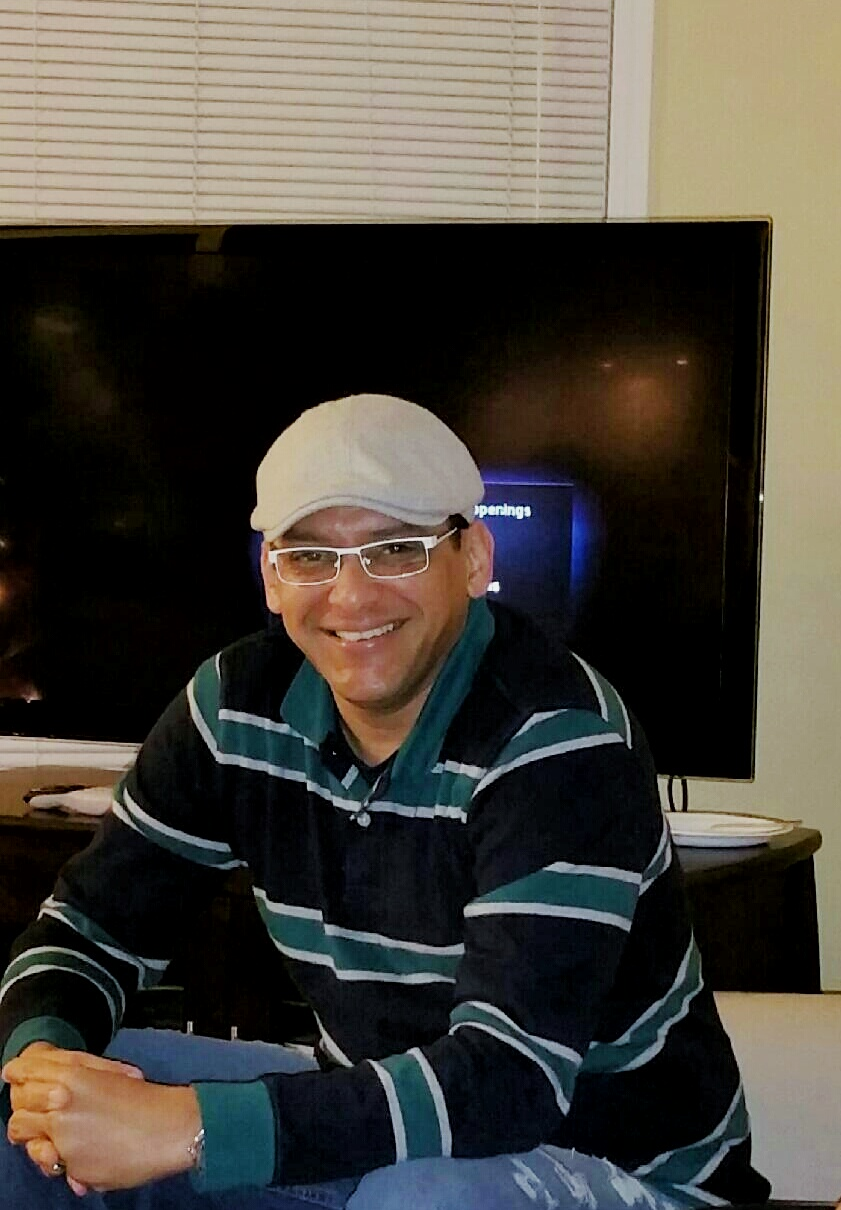
- Born: Cuba
- Notable work: Poetry and Cinema

Jorge Enrique González Pacheco is an international award-winning Cuban poet, film industry professional, and cultural entrepreneur. He has a Bachelor's Degree in Latin American Literature from University of Havana, Cuba, and a Master's Degree in Hispanic Literature from Complutense University of Madrid, Spain.

== Biography ==
González Pacheco was born in Marianao, Havana, on September 9, 1969. His mother died when he was very young, and his relationship with his father was turbulent. González Pacheco moved to the United States in 2003, and since 2006 he has been living in Seattle.

He published his first poem in Alaluz, a literary magazine of the University of California, Riverside. He has published six books, including Under the light of my blood.

In 1990 integrated the group of young poets that participated at the revolution of Cuban literature that distanced itself from political themes and created a clearer and more universal lyric. As a freedom defender, in an interview he criticized the situation of the civil liberties on his country.

One of his well-known poems titled "Havana" is dedicated to his childhood city.

González Pacheco is the founder and CEO of the Seattle Latino Film Festival (SLFF), a 501(c)(3) non-profit organization. SLFF is ranked on Top 5 of the most important Latino film festivals in the United States. Also he's the founder of Cine Seattle Entertainment LLC, a film production company located in Washington State.

He has read his poetry in the United States and many other countries, including Spain, and Singapore.

== Books ==
- (1992) Poesía Ilustrada, International Edition Group, New York, NY, USA
- (2003) Antología de la Décima Cósmica de La Habana, FAH, Mexico City, Mexico
- (2003) Notaciones del Inocente, Ediciones Qneras, Moguer, Spain
- (2004) Tierra de Secreta Transparencia, Torremozas & Fundación Juan Ramon Jimenez, Madrid, Spain
- (2009) Bajo la luz de mi sangre / Under the Light of my Blood (bilingual edition), Trafford, Victoria BC, Canada
- (2020) Habitante Invisible, Ediciones Deslinde, Madrid, España
- (2026) Inventario del tránsito, Ápeiron Ediciones, Madrid, España

== Awards ==
- 1996 Delia Carrera Poetry Prize, Havana, Cuba
- 2015 HIPGivers Award by Hispanics in Philanthropy, San Francisco, California, USA
- 2018 Mayor's Arts Award, Seattle, Washington, USA

== Interview ==
- La Poesía en su Sangre
- Un poète cubain-étasunien sur les rues de France.
- The 13th annual Seattle Latino Film Festival starts Friday
- Diversity is celebrated at the 2021 Seattle Film Festival
- Radio Interview in Spanish with Paula Lamas
- Fundo uno de los festivales de cine latino mas completos de Estados Unidos
- «La poesía me salvó y me ayudó a entender una vida con ausencias», "El Comercio", May, 3rd of 2023. Gijon, Spain.
- How Jorge Enrique González Pacheco Became a Leading Voice in the PNW for the Latino Community
- Good Day Seattle

== Notes ==
- González Pacheco, Jorge Enrique (1995). “La mudez del alba”. Revista Alaluz. XXVII (1): pag 59.
- González Pacheco, Jorge Enrique (2008). La dócil alba que en tu altura guia-L'aube docile qui depuis ton royaume guide. Paris, France: Arcoiris, Revue de Création Littéraire Bilingue. pp. 322, 323.
- González Pacheco, Jorge Enrique, Poetry Now, Sacramento Poetry Center (2009), California, USA
- Puentes Izquierdo, Zoraida (2011). Literatura Cubana contemporánea (1959-1999) Selección de lecturas (1ra ed.). Universidad de las Artes, Havana, Cuba: Ediciones Cúpulas. pp. 28, 30, 88.
- González Pacheco, Jorge Enrique, Poem: Pobre espacio del que huyo, Azahares, Spanish Language Literary Magazine (2015): pag 28, College of Languages and Communication, University of Arkansas - Fort Smith. USA
- González Pacheco, Jorge Enrique, Poems: Homeless and Inventario, Spanish Language Literary Magazine (2019): pag 5,6 College of Languages and Communication, University of Arkansas - Fort Smith. USA
- González Pacheco, Jorge Enrique, Revista Literaria (2020), pp 81, 82 University of South Florida - Tampa. USA
- González Pacheco, Jorge Enrique, Spanish Language Literary Magazine (2022): pags 33, 34, College of Languages and Communication, University of Arkansas - Fort Smith. USA
- +LATINO/A DIASPORA HERITAGE RESOURCE PACKET, Burke Museum, University of Washington (WA) pag 3
- Tarik Abdullah, Paula Boggs, Fulgencio Lazo, Jorge Enrique Gonzalez Pacheco, and Karen P. Thomas receive Seattle Mayor's Arts Awards on August 30, 2018.
- Voices in the Forest, City of Shoreline, WA, USA
