= Seattle Latino Film Festival =

- Location: Seattle, United States
- Language: Spanish, Portuguese, English, Indigenous Languages
- Website: http://www.slff.org/

SEATTLE LATINO FILM FESTIVAL (SLFF) is a 501(c)(3) non profit organization.

== History ==
SLFF was founded in 2009 by Cuban-born, Internationally known Poet and Film Industry Professional Jorge Enrique González Pacheco. SLFF has the goal to bring audiences and filmmakers together for an educational experience and to support the magic of filmmaking as a part of Hispanic culture globally. The festival discovers and presents independent films, documentaries and short films from Latin American countries, Spain and Portugal at the Northwest of the United States. SLFF is ranked at the Top 5 of the best Latin-American Film Festival in the United States. The SLFF is the only forum in the Pacific Northwest for genuine Spanish & Portuguese cinema.

== Festivals ==
- Seattle Latino Film Festival, 2009-Spotlight country: Colombia
- Seattle Latino Film Festival, 2010-Spotlight country: Mexico
- Seattle Latino Film Festival, 2011-Spotlight country: Argentina
- Seattle Latino Film Festival, 2012-Spotlight country: Brazil
- Seattle Latino Film Festival, 2013-Spotlight country: Cuba
- Seattle Latino Film Festival, 2014-Spotlight country: Chile
- Seattle Latino Film Festival, 2015-Spotlight country: Peru
- Seattle Latino Film Festival, 2016-Spotlight country: Venezuela
- Seattle Latino Film Festival, 2017-Spotlight country: Dominican Republic
- Seattle Latino Film Festival, 2018-Spotlight country: Spain
- Seattle Latino Film Festival 2019
- Seattle Latino Film Festival 2020
- Seattle Latino Film Festival 2021
- Seattle Latino Film Festival 2022
- Seattle Latino Film Festival 2023
- Seattle Latino Film Festival 2024
- Seattle Latino Film Festival 2025

== Guests ==
- Leon Ichaso, Cuban-American Film Director.
- Fernando Trueba, Spanish Academy Award winner.
- Damian Alcazar, Mexican actor.
- Rafa Lara, Mexican Director.
- Yvette Marichal, Film Commissioner from Dominican Republic.
- Fina Torres
- Alison Murray

== Press ==
- Seattle supporters of Latino films excited by Alfonso Cuarón’s Oscar win
- Seattle skateboarder captures Mexico City’s intimate underground economy on film
- Seattle Latino Film Festival comes to Redmond
- The 13th annual Seattle Latino Film Festival starts Friday.
- Actor, director talk new film at Seattle Latino Film Festival
- 16th annual Seattle Latino Film Festival highlights cinema, art and culture
