= Finis Terrae University =

University in Chile

Coordinates: 33°26′12″S 70°36′29″W

University Finis Terrae
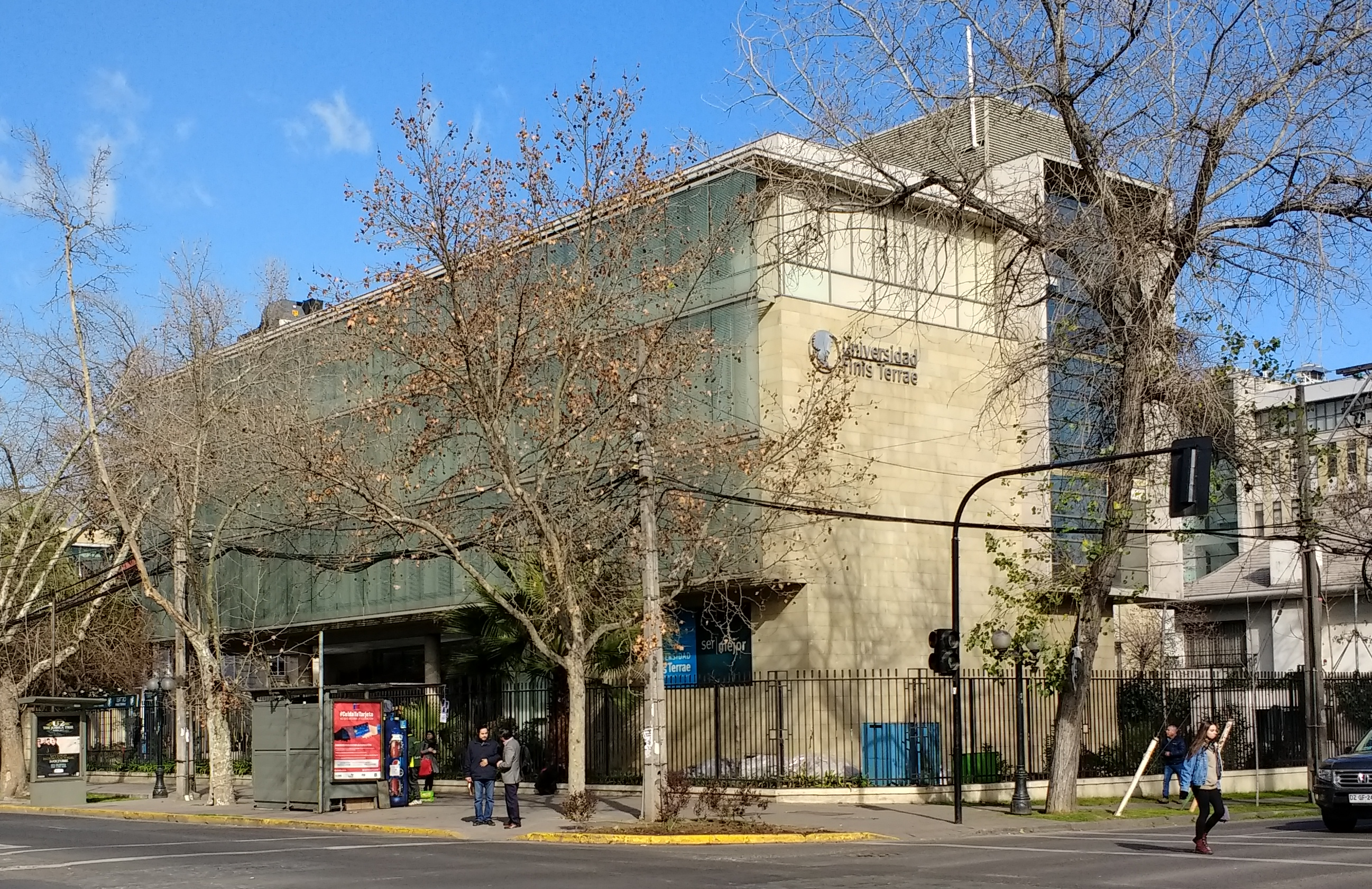
- Established: 1988
- Students: 9,154 (2020)
- Undergraduates: 8,040
- Postgraduates: 1,114
- Location: Santiago, Chile
- Website: finis.cl

Universidad Finis Terrae (English: Finis Terrae University) (UFT) is a Chilean university. It is a private autonomous institution in Santiago owned by the Anahuac University Network.
