= Chiquitita (drag artist) =

American drag artist

- Born: Angel Flores; August 13, 1998 (age 28); New York City, U.S.
- Other names: Harajuku; Juku
- Occupations: Drag queen; seamstress
- Website: www.chiquitita.co

Angel Flores (born August 13, 1998), better known by the stage name Chiquitita, is a drag performance artist and seamstress, who has dabbled within collage art and resides in Brooklyn, New York. She is known for using her transformative couture fashions and her creative direction to produce live lip sync performances, along with her collage and design skills to bring about black and brown transgender visibility.

== Biography ==
Chiquitita was born Angel Flores in Queens, New York City, to parents of Salvadoran descent. She had a decent childhood until her parents divorced while she was in the third grade. Ultimately home life affected Flores' duties at school, after becoming a frequent user of marijuana and hallucinogenic mushrooms while in her early teenage years as a middle school student. Having fallen into drug addiction as a youth, Flores' home life escalated after she briefly ran away from home. Soon after returning home at the age of 16, Flores sobered up and was introduced to drag, an art form meant to perform gender. From then on Flores used the stage name known as Harajuku (also known as Juku), modeled after Gwen Stefani's song "Harajuku Girls". Over the years, Flores, having gone by the title of Juku, made the decision to change her stage name, which was inspired by the ABBA song "Chiquitita". The role of Chiquitita and drag itself introduced her to a new gender identity, allowing her to realize her trans-ness through the art form of drag that entails makeup, creating her own wardrobe and lip sync performance. The name Chiquitita is meant to highlight her Hispanic identity. To this day, Chiquitita explores her art form within performance and has helped construct queer safe spaces, community and unity within the borough of Brooklyn.

On May 12, 2024, she made headlines after interrupting Ross Mathews' GLAAD speech to chant “GLAAD is complicit in genocide", in protest of their lack of statement in support of Palestine during the Gaza war.

== Art ==
- Zebra print Valentino Re-creation (2020)
- Jezebel Performance (Bushwig 2021)
- Head in the Clouds (2020)
