= David Mitrani Arenal =

Cuban writer

David Mitrani Arenal (born May 12, 1966 in Havana, Cuba) is a Cuban writer, poet and researcher.

In 1998, Arenal won the Anna Seghers International Prize from the Anna Seghers Foundation and the Academy of Arts Berlin. He won the Alejo Carpentier award in 2003.

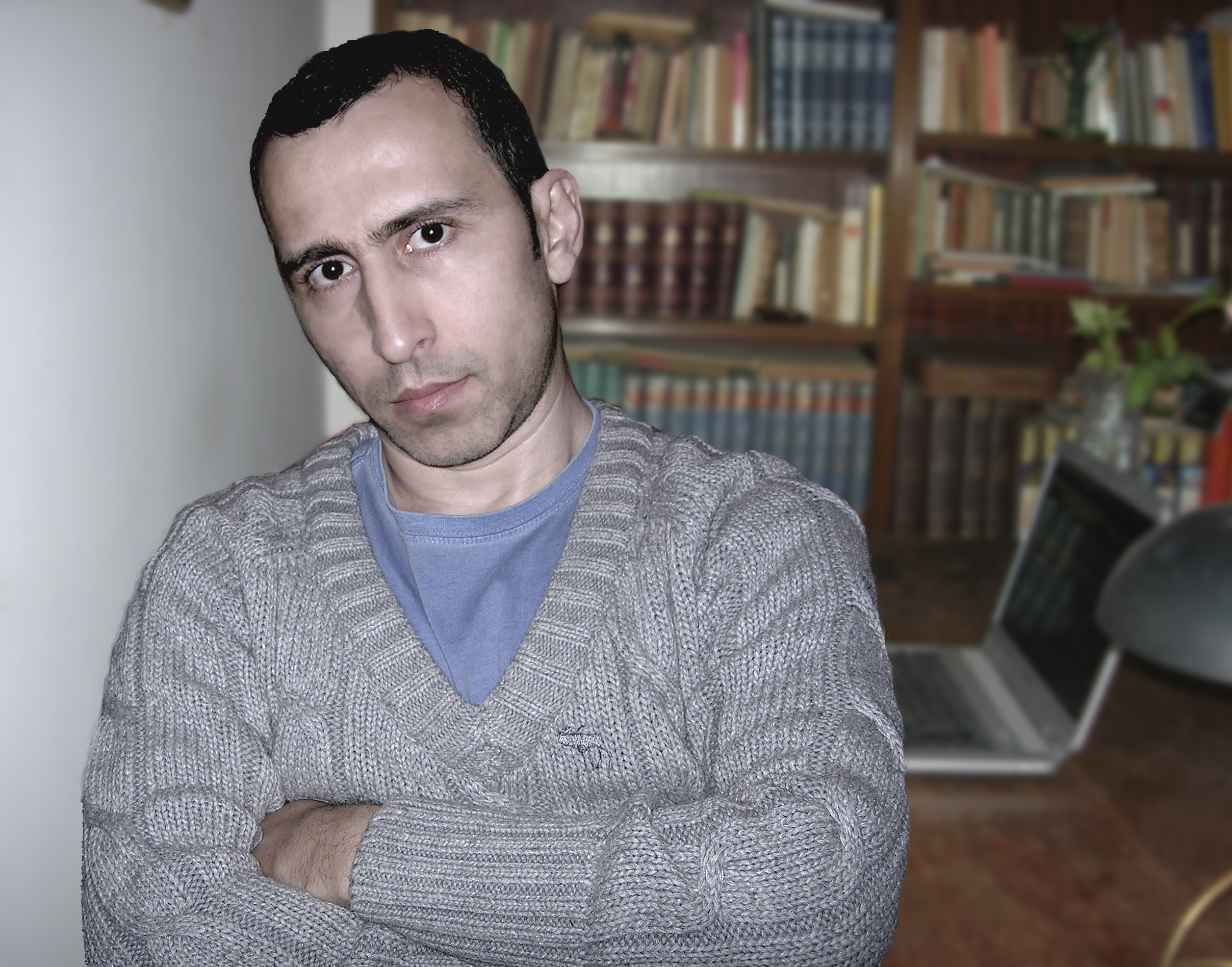
David Mitrani Arenal

== Introduction ==
In 1993, Arenal won the Pinos Nuevos literary contest with his story book Modelar el barro (Modeling the clay). In 1997, he published the story book Santos lugares (Holy Places) and in 1999 the novel Ganeden. Los malditos se reúnen (Coven of the cursed) won the Alejo Carpentier prize in 2003. In 2011, he published the novel Deja dormir a la bestia (Let the beast to sleep).

In 2003, Arenal published the poetry book Hereje inadvertido (Heretic unnoticed) and the Book of decimas, co-written with the poet Alexis Diaz Pimienta, In 1994, Robinson Crusoe vuelve a salvarse (Robinson Crusoe survives again) won the Cucalambé literary contest.

As a researcher, Arenal worked with the Italian philologist Giuliana Della Valle in the field of improvised oral poetry. They have published two books: Cuba Improvvisa (Cuba improvises, 2006) and Caffè diVerso (Coffee of verses, 2010).

== Other publications ==
=== Stories in anthologies and magazines ===
- «La Strada» (The street) in A labbra nude, Milan: Feltrinelli, 1995, (title orig. "La calle").
- «Tu mujer» (Your woman) in La Gaceta de Cuba, 1995.
- «Un joven de pelo largo» (A young man with long hair) in Premio Cuentos de Amor, Las Tunas: San Lope, 1996.
- «Adultere esordienti» (Adulterous first-) in Cuba poi muori Vedi, Milan: Feltrinelli, 1997, (title orig. Siete mujeres para Odel).
- «1980» in Cuentos habaneros, Mexico City: Selector, 1997.
- «Un joven de pelo largo» (A young man with long hair) in Cuentos habaneros, Mexico City: Selector, 1997.
- «No hay regreso para Johnny» (No turning back for Johnny) in La Gaceta de Cuba, 1997.
- «Un joven de pelo largo» (A young man with long hair) in Otra vez amor, Havana: Cuban Letters, 1997.
- «1980» in Confini. No. 7, University of Milan, in December 1999.
- «Der Lauf der Dinge» (Crossroads) in Argonautenschiff, Jahrbuch 8, Berlin, 1999, (title orig. Cruce de caminos).
- «No hay regreso para Johnny» (No turning back for Johnny) in Cubanísimo!, Berlin: Surhkamp, 2000.
- «Pas de retour pour billet Johnny» (No turning back for Johnny) in Des nouvelles, Paris: Metellié, 2000, (title orig. No hay regreso para Johnny).
- «No hay regreso para Johnny» (No turning back for Johnny) in Nueva narrativa cubana, Madrid: Siruela, 2000.
- «El esclavo del pianista» (The slave of the pianist) in Casa de Las Américas No. 224, Havana, 2001, p. 55-62.
- «Modelar el barro» (Modelling the clay) in Irreverente eros, Havana, Jose Marti, 2001.
- «Keiner kennt give Fliegenfänger» (Will come the day of the hunter) in ADAC, Berlino, 2002, (title orig. Ya llegará el día del cazador).
- «Tiro de cámara» (Camera Shot) in Cicatrices en la memoria, Havana: Capitán San Luis, 2003.
- «Tiro de cámara» (Camera Shot) in Cicatrices en la memoria, Mexico City: Ocean, 2003.
- «Un joven de pelo largo» (A young man with long hair) in Colinas como elefantes blancos, Havana: Extramuros, 2003.
- «Ya llegará el día del cazador» (Will come the day of the hunter) in La Jiribilla, Havana, No. 113, year III, July 4, 2003.
- «El esclavo del pianista» (The slave of the pianist) in La letra del escriba, Havana, 2004.
- «No turning back for Johnny» in The Cuban Reader, California, USA: Duke University Press, 2004, (title orig. No hay regreso para Johnny)
- «El esclavo del pianista» (The slave of the pianist) in Conversaciones con el búfalo blanco. Antología y entrevistas con autores cubanos. Havana: Letras Cubanas-Monte Ávila, 2005.
- «Erezioni nel bus» in Con L'Avana nel cuore, Rome: Marco Tropea, 2005, (title orig. Erecciones en el bus).
- «Uno sparo dalla telecamera» (Camera Shot) in Nero and Avana. Antologia di racconti cubani contemporanei Rome: Bookever-Editori Riuniti, 2007, (title orig. Tiro de cámara).
- «Vuoi che ti chiamino Gina?» (Do you want to be called Gina?) in Nero and Avana. Antologia di racconti cubani Contemporanei. Rome: Bookever-Editori Riuniti, 2007, (title orig. ¿Quieres que te llamen Gina?).
- «Morir es un placer» (Dying is a pleasure) in Caminos de humo. Antología de cuentos cubanos con aroma de tobacco. Santiago de Cuba: Editorial Oriente, 2010.

=== Poems in anthologies and magazines ===
- «Algoritmo» I (Algorithm I) in Agua del ciervo que canta, Havana: Letras Cubanas, 1992.
- «Conversación con mi hijo» (Conversation with my son) in La Gaveta, Pinar del Rio, 2002.
- «Épico» (Epic) in La Gaveta, Pinar del Rio, 2002.
- «Acuse del soldado desconocido» (Acknowledgement of the unknown soldier) in La Gaveta, Pinar del Rio, 2002.
- «Algoritmo II» (Algorithm II) in Que caí bajo la noche, Ciego de Ávila: Ávila Ediciones, 2004.

=== Articles and essays ===
- «La nueva décima cubana: novodecimismo» (The new Cuban décima: novodecimismo) in La décima popular en Latinoamérica, Veracruz, Mexico: 1994.
- «Telegrama en diez líneas» (Telegram in ten lines) in Habáname No. 1, 1997.
- «Zamora Jo y el paraíso» (Zamora Jo and Paradise) in La letra del escriba No. 34, November, 2004, p. 14.
- «L’elemento comico nella poesia orale cubana» (The comic element in the Cuban oral poetry), in las Actas del Congreso Intrecci di culture, marginalità ed egemonia in America Latina e Mediterraneo, organizado por las Universidades de Estudios de Boloña, Cagliari y Siena (23-24 septiembre 2005), Roma, Meltemi, 2008, pp. 243–260.
- «Aproximación a la técnica poética de los repentistas cubanos» (Approaching the poetic technique of Cuban repentistas) in Verba Manent. Oralità e scrittura in America Latina e nel Meditarreno, Rome: Editoriale Artemide, 2011.

== Awards ==
- Università La Sapienza di Roma. January 2010. Is named "Cultore della materia" for "Lingua e Traduzione Spagnola" at L'Università La Sapienza di Roma (L-LIN 07).
- Order of the Ministry of Culture. Medal of the Cuban Culture In, 2004 in, 2004.
- National Award "Alejo Carpentier" for the book Los malditos se reúnen (Coven of the cursed), 2003.
- International Prize "Anna Seghers" established for Anna Seghers Foundation and the Academy of Arts in Berlin, 1998.
- Diploma of the Cuban Union of Artists and Writers (UNEAC) Highlights Young Cuban Writer, 1998.
- National Award Cuentos de Amor de Las Tunas for Un joven de pelo largo (A young man with a long hair), 1996.
- Prize of Poetry "La Rambla", Almeria, Spain, for the book El arca: cinco días del diluvio (The Ark: five days after the flood), 1995.
- Prize of narrative "Pinos Nuevos" for the book Modelar el barro (Modeling the clay), 1993.
- Prize "Cucalambé" for the book, cowritten with Alexis Díaz Pimienta, Robinson Crusoe vuelve a salvarse (Robinson Crusoe survives again), 1993.
- Prize 26 de Julio for the book Algo más sobre los inmortales (More about the immortals), 1990.
