= Dulce María Loynaz =

Cuban poet (1902–1997)

Dulce María Loynaz Muñoz (Havana, Cuba; 10 December 1902 – 27 April 1997) was a Cuban poet, and is considered one of the principal figures of Cuban literature. She was awarded the Miguel de Cervantes Prize in 1992. She earned her Doctorate in Civil Law at University of Havana in 1927.

== Early life ==
Dulce María Loynaz was the daughter of the famous General Enrique Loynaz del Castillo, a hero of the Cuban Liberation Army and author of the lyrics of the march theme, "El Himno Invasor", and sister of poet Enrique Loynaz Muñoz. Dulce María was born in Havana, Cuba on December 10, 1902, to a family of great sensibility towards artistic and cultural manifestations and deep patriotic feelings. Homeschooled as a child, Loynaz grew up in a familiar environment highly propitious for poetry.

Although Loynaz had a sheltered childhood, her early adulthood was much more adventurous, including experiences available at that time only to wealthy young women, even outside of Cuba. She published a number of poems in her teens and twenties.

=== Education ===
She completed the Doctorate of Civil Law at the University of Havana in 1927, but rarely practiced law, and stopped practicing altogether in 1961 out of dislike. She was able to travel widely. In addition, her talents and her family's social position brought her into personal contact with some of the major Spanish-language authors of the century, including Spanish author Federico García Lorca, Chilean poet Gabriela Mistral who won the Nobel Prize in Literature in 1945, Cuban author Alejo Carpentier, and the Spanish writer Juan Ramón Jiménez who won the Nobel Prize in Literature in 1956.

== Publications and poetry ==
Loynaz published her first poems in La Nación in 1920. She traveled extensively including to Turkey, Syria, Libya, Palestine, and Egypt. Loynaz also visited Mexico in 1937 and various countries in South America from 1946 to 1947, and the Canary Islands in 1947 and 1951 where she as declared adoptive daughter.

Loynaz began writing Jardin in 1928 and completed the novel in 1935, shortly after Cuban women obtained the right to vote. During these early decades of the twentieth century, a time of great feminist activity, a dynamic and effective women's movement flourished in Cuba, and women's rights became part of the Cuban political consciousness. The feminist attitude Loynaz displays in Jardin is tied strongly to the image of the city. The novel begins and ends with the heroine looking out from the garden toward a city that resembles Havana.

In 1950, she published weekly chronicles at different publications of the epoch such as El País, Excélsior, Social, Grafos, Diario de la Marina, El Mundo, Revista Cubana, Revista Bimestre Cubana and Orígenes. In 1953, she attended as the university's guest, celebrations that marked the 700th year since the naming of Salamanca University.

Her book Poemas sin nombre (Untitled Poems) was translated to Italian in 1955. She participated in conferences and readings, not only in Cuba but also in Spain and Latin America. She was elected as a member of the Arts and Literature National Academy in 1951, of the Cuban Academy of Language in 1959 and the Spanish Royal Academy of Language in 1968.

The Royal Academy of Spanish Language nominated her for the Miguel de Cervantes Prize in 1984. In 1985, Poesías Escogidas (Selected Poems) and Bestarium (a book of poems written before 1959) were published in Havana. During these years, she participated in conferences, gave speeches, and received prizes and awards bestowed by different Cuban cultural institutions.

She was awarded the King Alfonso X the Wise Order and on November 5, 1992, the Miguel de Cervantes Prize, an honorable distinction she received in Spain in 1992 from King Juan Carlos I's hands. This is considered the Nobel prize in the world of the Spanish literature.

In 1959 she voluntarily stopped writing and publishing in Cuba.

She received several awards among them: National Order of Carlos Manuel de Céspedes, Order of Félix Varela of the Culture, National Culture Distinctive Award, the Alejo Carpentier Medal (Cuba), and The Civil Order of Alfonso X the Wise in 1947. She was awarded the Cuban National Prize for Literature (1987).

== Death ==
Dulce María Loynaz died in 1997 and was interred in the Colón Cemetery, Havana.

== Work ==
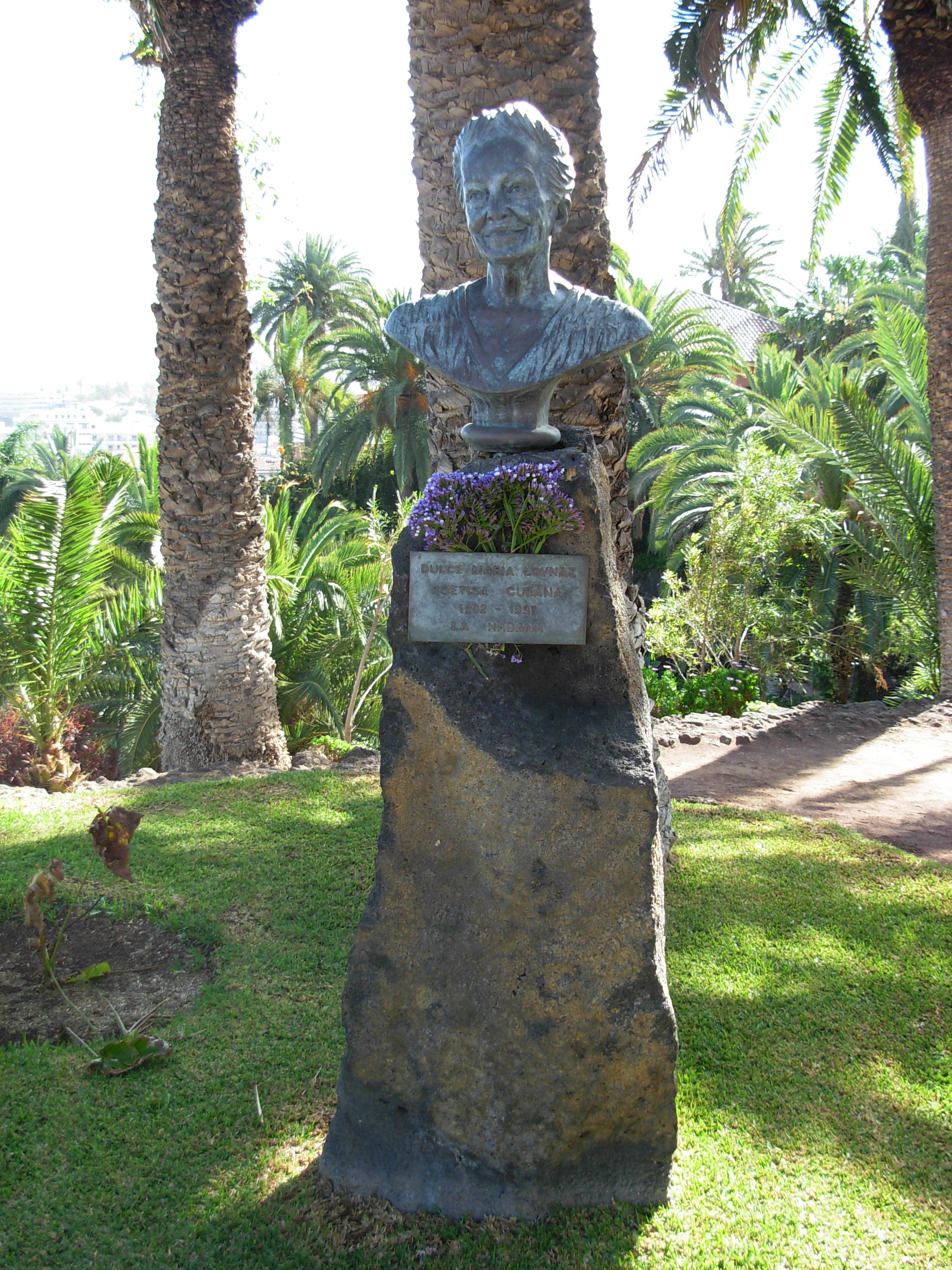
Monument to Loynaz in Puerto de la Cruz

- Versos (Verses). Madrid, 1950.
- Canto a la mujer esteril, 1938.
- Juegos de agua. Versos del agua y del amor, 1947.
- Obra lirica, 1955.
- Ultimos dias de una casa, 1958.
- Poesias escogidas, 1984.
- La novia de Lazaro, 1991.
- Poesia completa, 1993.
- Antologia lirica, 1993.
- Finas redes, 1993.
- Poemas escogidos, 1993.
- Miel imprevista (anthology), 1997.
- Melancolia de otoño, 1997.
- Diez sonetos a Cristo, 1998.
- El aspero sendero, 2001.
- Poemas sin nombre (Nameless Poems). Aguilar.
- Bestiarium (Bestiary). Poems
- Poemas naúfragos (Shipwrecked poems). Editorial Letras Cubanas, 1991.
- Jardín (Garden). Lyric novel. Aguilar, Madrid, 1951.
- Un verano en Tenerife (A summer in Tenerife). Memoir. Aguilar, Madrid, 1958.
- Carta de Amor al Rey Tut-Ank-Amen (Love Letter to King Tutankhamen).
- Poems Without Name. Bilingual: English translations by Harriet de Onís. Editorial José Martí, 1993.
- A woman in her garden: selected poems of Dulce Maria Loynaz. Dulce María Loynaz; Judith Kerman, 2002.

== See also ==
- Caribbean literature
- Cuban literature
- Caribbean poetry
