= Espiridiona Cenda =

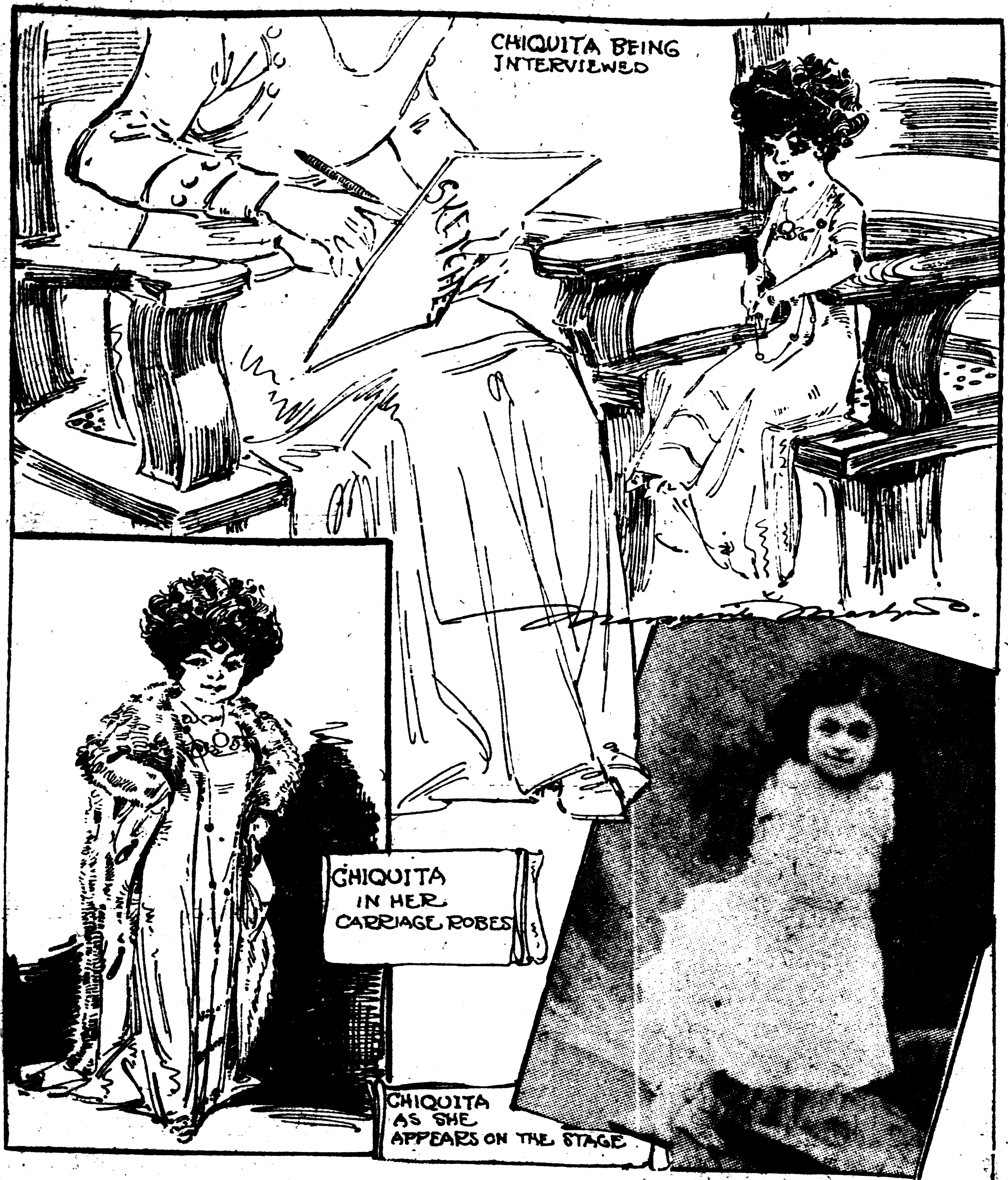
- Cenda sketched by Marguerite Martyn for the St. Louis Post-Dispatch (1910)
- Born: Alize Espiridiona Cenda del Castillo; December 14, 1869; Near Matanzas, Cuba
- Died: December 11, 1945 (aged 75); United States
- Other names: Chiquita, The Cuban Doll, The Cuban Atom
- Occupations: Singer, dancer, vaudeville performer
- Height: 26 in (66 cm)
- Spouse: Tony Woeckener (m. 1901)

Alize Espiridiona Cenda del Castillo (14 December 1869 – 11 December 1945), better known by her stage name Chiquita (and billed as "The Cuban Doll" or "The Cuban Atom"), was a Cuban singer, dancer, and vaudeville performer. Standing 26 inches (66 cm) tall, she became an internationally prominent attraction in the late 19th and early 20th centuries, performing across the United States and Europe and serving as an official mascot of the 1901 Pan-American Exposition in Buffalo, New York.

== Early life ==
Cenda was born on 14 December 1869 near Matanzas, Cuba, into a middle-class family. She was the eldest of five siblings, all of whom were of average height. From an early age, she took singing lessons and developed an interest in collecting fans. During the Cuban War of Independence, her family experienced displacement, and two of her brothers served in the Cuban Liberation Army.

== Vaudeville career ==
In 1895, promoter Frank C. Bostock took over her management, featuring her in prominent touring side-shows and variety theatres across the United States and Europe.

On 23 July 1896, she made her formal New York debut at the Metropolitan Hotel, where contemporary press coverage highlighted her linguistic ability—being fluent in Spanish, English, and Italian—as well as her singing and dancing repertoire. In subsequent years, she performed in major venues including the Palace Theatre in New York, the Detroit Temple Theatre, and the Kirksville Opera House in Missouri. In 1905, she toured London alongside the Russian giant Feodor Machnow.

=== 1901 Pan-American Exposition ===
At the Pan-American Exposition held in 1901 in Buffalo, New York, Cenda was one of the central midway attractions. Director General William I. Buchanan officially designated her as the exposition's mascot.

For her transportation through the grounds, Cenda commissioned inventor C. Francis Jenkins to construct what was recognized at the time as the smallest automobile ever manufactured: a custom electric miniature Victoria, complete with a top, electric headlights, a warning gong, and a 24-inch wheelbase.

=== White House reception ===
On 13 February 1901, Cenda was received in the White House by United States President William McKinley. During the visit, she commended McKinley for his administration's support for the Cuban people during the conflict with Spain, after which the President removed a pink carnation from his lapel and fastened it to her dress.

== Personal life ==
In 1901, Cenda married 17-year-old Tony Woeckener. The couple had one son, who weighed approximately two pounds at birth and died during infancy.

Contemporary accounts noted her insistence on being treated as an adult and a professional performer rather than a novelty, regularly refusing accommodations such as highchairs that emphasized her small stature. Cenda died in the United States on 11 December 1945, at the age of 75.

== In popular culture ==
Cenda's life was the basis for the 2008 historical novel Chiquita by Cuban author Antonio Orlando Rodríguez, which was awarded the Premio Alfaguara.
