= Orlando Rossardi =

Cuban poet, playwright and researcher (1938–2024)

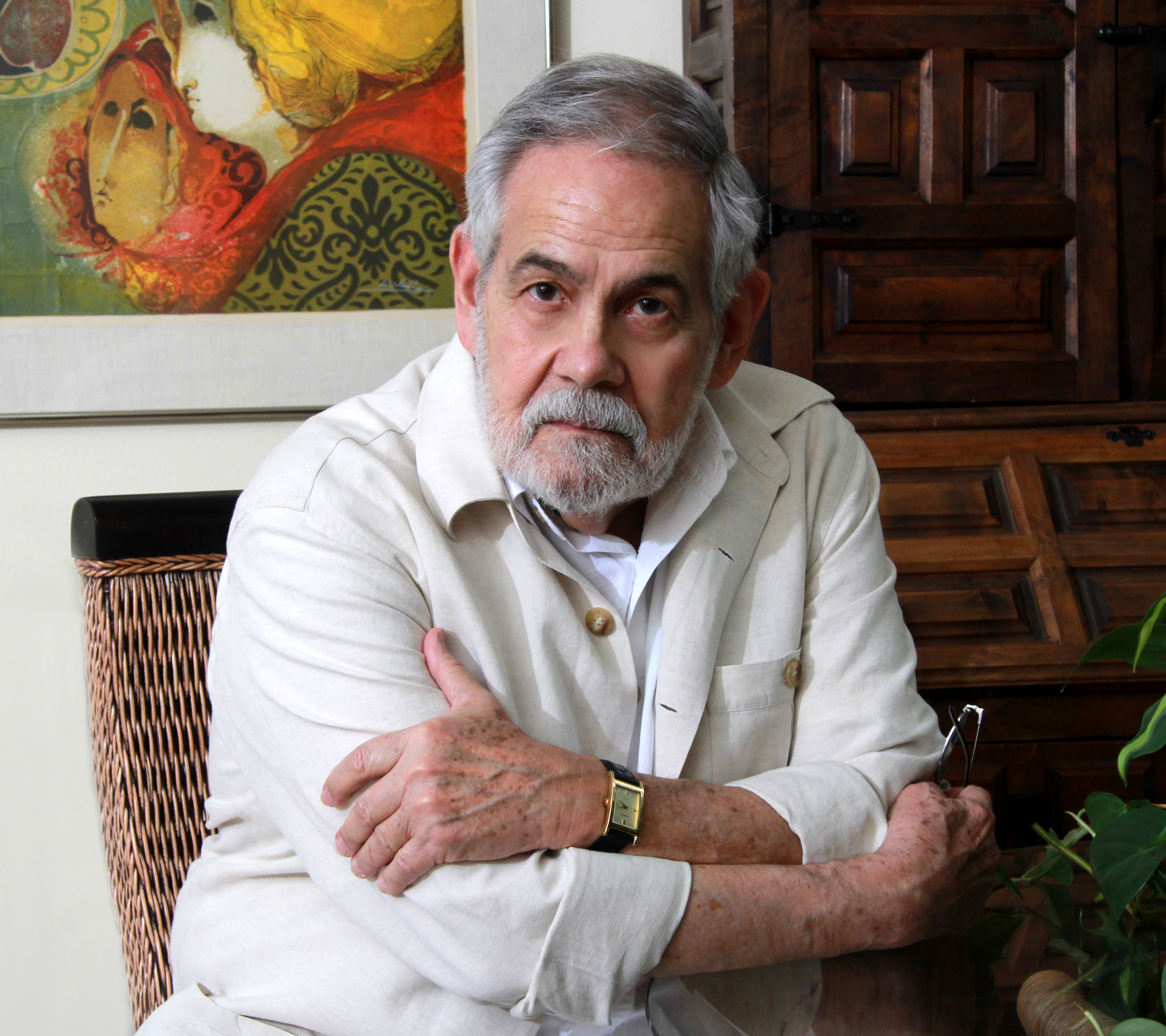
- Rossardi in 2013
- Born: September 5, 1938 Havana, Cuba
- Died: December 5, 2024 (aged 86) Concón, Chile
- Occupation: Poet, playwright, researcher

Orlando Rossardi (September 5, 1938 – December 5, 2024) was a Cuban poet, playwright and a researcher in Latin American literature.

== Life and career ==
Orlando Rossardi (pseudonym of Orlando Rodríguez Sardiñas) was born in Havana, Cuba in 1938. He left the island in 1960, and ever afterwards lived in Spain and in the United States.

Orlando Rodríguez Sardiñas obtained a Ph.D. at the University of Texas at Austin, and taught at the University of New Hampshire, Wisconsin and Miami Dade College in Florida.

He began working in 1984 for Radio Martí in Washington, D.C, and later at their office in Miami, FL, as programming coordinator and subsequently deputy director, dedicating twenty years of his life to the broadcasting services of the United States Government.

Orlando Rossardi published primarily poetry and his collections include El Diámetro y lo Estero (1964), Que voy de vuelo (1970), Los espacios llenos (1991), Memoria de mí (1996), Los pies en la tierra (2006), Libro de las pérdidas (2008), Casi la voz (2009), Canto en la Florida (2010), Fundación del centro (2011) y Totalidad (2012).

His anthology, La última poesía cubana (1973), is considered by critics the first major work bringing together the Cuban poets both from the island and from exile.

His other works include six volumes of Historia de la Literatura Hispanoamericana Contemporánea (1976) the three volumes on Teatro Selecto Hispanoamericano Contemporáneo (1971), as well as an essay on the Colombian avant garde poet León de Greiff: una poética de vanguardia (1974).

Rossardi was a member of the North American Academy of the Spanish Language (Academia Norteamericana de la Lengua Española) and Correspondent of the Royal Academy of the Spanish Language in Madrid, Spain. His research contributions can be found in encyclopedias, dictionaries, and literary magazines in Spain and Latin America as well as in the United States.

Rossardi died in Concón, Chile on December 5, 2024, at the age of 86.

== Works ==
Poetry

- Obra Selecta (Valencia, 2019)
- Tras los rostros (Valencia, 2017)
- Palabra afuera (Valencia, 2015)
- Totalidad (Valencia, 2012)
- Fundación del centro (Valencia, 2011)
- Canto en la Florida (Valencia, 2010)
- Casi la voz (Valencia, 2009)
- Libro de las pérdidas (Valencia, 2008)
- Los pies en la tierra (Madrid, 2006)
- Memoria de mí (Madrid, 1996)
- Los espacios llenos (Madrid, 1991)
- La última poesía cubana (Madrid, 1973)
- Que voy de vuelo (Madrid, 1970)
- El diametro y lo estero (Madrid, 1964)

Theater

- La visita (Virginia, 1997)
- Teatro Selecto Hispanoamericano Contemporáneo, 3 volumes,(Madrid, 1973)

Essays

- Gabriela Mistral y los Estados Unidos (New York, 2011)
- Historia de la literatura hispanoamericana, 6 volumes, (Madrid, 1976)
- León de Greiff: una poética de vanguardia (Madrid, 1973)

Cuadernos monográficos

- Dossier Orlando Rossardi (La Gota de Agua, Philadelphia, 2018)
