= Silvestre de Balboa =

Cuban writer

- Born: 30 June 1563
- Died: 1644 (aged 80–81)
- Occupation: Writer

Silvestre de Balboa Troya Quesada (June 30, 1563 – c. 1644) was a writer from the Canary Islands, considered to be the writer of the first literary text in Cuba.

Very little information is known of him, among which is his baptism certificate dated in Las Palmas de Gran Canaria, June 30, 1563. Hidalgo, of the gentry, notes that he arrived in Cuba between 1590 and 1600.

It is known that in 1604 that he was in the city of Manzanillo, but later settled in the village of Santa María del Puerto del Príncipe, current Camagüey province, where he was confirmed as clerk of the council.

== Work ==
Silvestre de Balboa's work Espejo de paciencia remained hidden and survived the fire that devastated the town in 1616. It was found in 1836 by Jose Antonio Echeverria, who discovered the manuscripts in poor condition in the archives of the Patriotic Society of Havana, interspersed with other documents. The poem was published without any change in its original though only in fragments for two years after its discovery in 1838 in the newspaper El Plantel. And soon after it was published in full for the first time in the second edition of the Bibliografía cubana de los siglos XVII and XVIII.

=== Espejo de paciencia ===
Espejo de paciencia is considered the first literary work in Cuba: based on historical fact about the capture of the bishop of the island of Cuba, Don Juan de las Cabezas Altamirano, at the hands of the French privateer Gilberto Giron in 1604 in the Manzanillo port, and his subsequent rescue by the villagers led by Gregorio Ramos, and how the pirate was killed at the hands of the slave Salvador Golomon.

Balboa had a pretty firm literary training and his work shows the influence of Canary poets Bartolomé Cairasco de Figueroa and Antonio de Viana.

=== Death ===
A document from 1644 has been found in which it is stated that Catalina de la Coba and Consuegra, “principeña, widow”, granted a will. Therefore it follows that her husband Silvestre de Balboa must have died that year (1644) or a year earlier (1643).
