= Mirror of patience =

1838 epic poem by Silvestre de Balboa

Espejo de paciencia
- Author: Silvestre de Balboa
- Language: Spanish
- Genre: Epic poem
- Publication date: 1838
- Publication place: Cuba
- Pages: 40 pages

"Mirror of patience" (Spanish: Espejo de paciencia) is an epic poem written in 1608 by Silvestre de Balboa. It is considered the first literature piece written in Cuba. It was occult until the year 1838 when was published in El Plantel, a nineteenth-century magazine. Before, the writer José Antonio Echevarría found it between the shelves of the library of the "Society of Friends of the Country".

The poem is about a true story that occurred in the port of Manzanillo in 1604, when the bishop of the Island of Cuba, Don Juan de las Cabezas Altamirano, in a travel to visit the farms in Yara, was kidnapped by the French corsair Gilberto Girón, with the intent to make the town pay a huge ransom. Then a group of neighbors from Bayamo prepare to fight against the corsairs. In combat, a black slave named Golomón defeats Gilberto Girón and cuts off his head. The bishop is rescued and the people celebrate.
