= Carilda Oliver Labra =

Cuban poet (1922–2018)

Carilda Oliver Labra (6 July 1922 – 29 August 2018) was a Cuban poet. She was born in Matanzas and died there as well.

== Life ==
Carilda Labra studied law at the University of Havana. She was also known to excel at drawing, painting and sculpting.

== Books ==
- Discurso de Eva (Eve's Discourse)
- Lyric Prelude ( Preludio Lyricio) (1943)
- At the South to My Throat (1949)
- Feverish Memory (Meoria de la Fibre)
- Sombra Sere que No Dama antologia Poetica (2000)

== Career ==
Known as one of the most influential Cuban poets, Labra's work is focused on love, the role of women in society and herself. A few of her works such as Discurso de Eva ("Eve's Discourse") show a profound literary technique.

Labra's debut collection in 1943, Lyric Prelude (Preludio lirico), immediately established her as an important poetic voice. She became famous after publishing her book At the South of My Throat (1949). She also won the National Prize for poetry in 1950 for the popular and notorious book At the South of My Throat (Al sur de mi garganta). In 1950, in honor of the tri-centennial of Sor Juana Inés de la Cruz in a contest sponsored by The Latin American Society in Washington D.C., Labra received the national Cuban First Prize for her poems. Her work was highly praised by Gabriela Mistral, the Chilean poet and first Latin American woman to win the Nobel Prize for Literature in 1945. In 1958, Oliver Labra published Feverish Memory (Memoria de la fiebre) which added to her notoriety as a blatantly erotic woman. The book concerned a theme which has dominated her poetry, lost love, as it was written after the untimely death of her second husband. In 2000, Labra published Sombra Sere Que No Dama: Antologia Poetica.

== Awards and Recognition ==
- The National Poetry Prize (1950)
- The Cuban First Prize (1950)
- National Literature Award (1997)
- The José de Vasconcelos International Prize (2002).
