= Antonio Orlando Rodríguez =

Cuban writer, journalist and critic (born 1956)

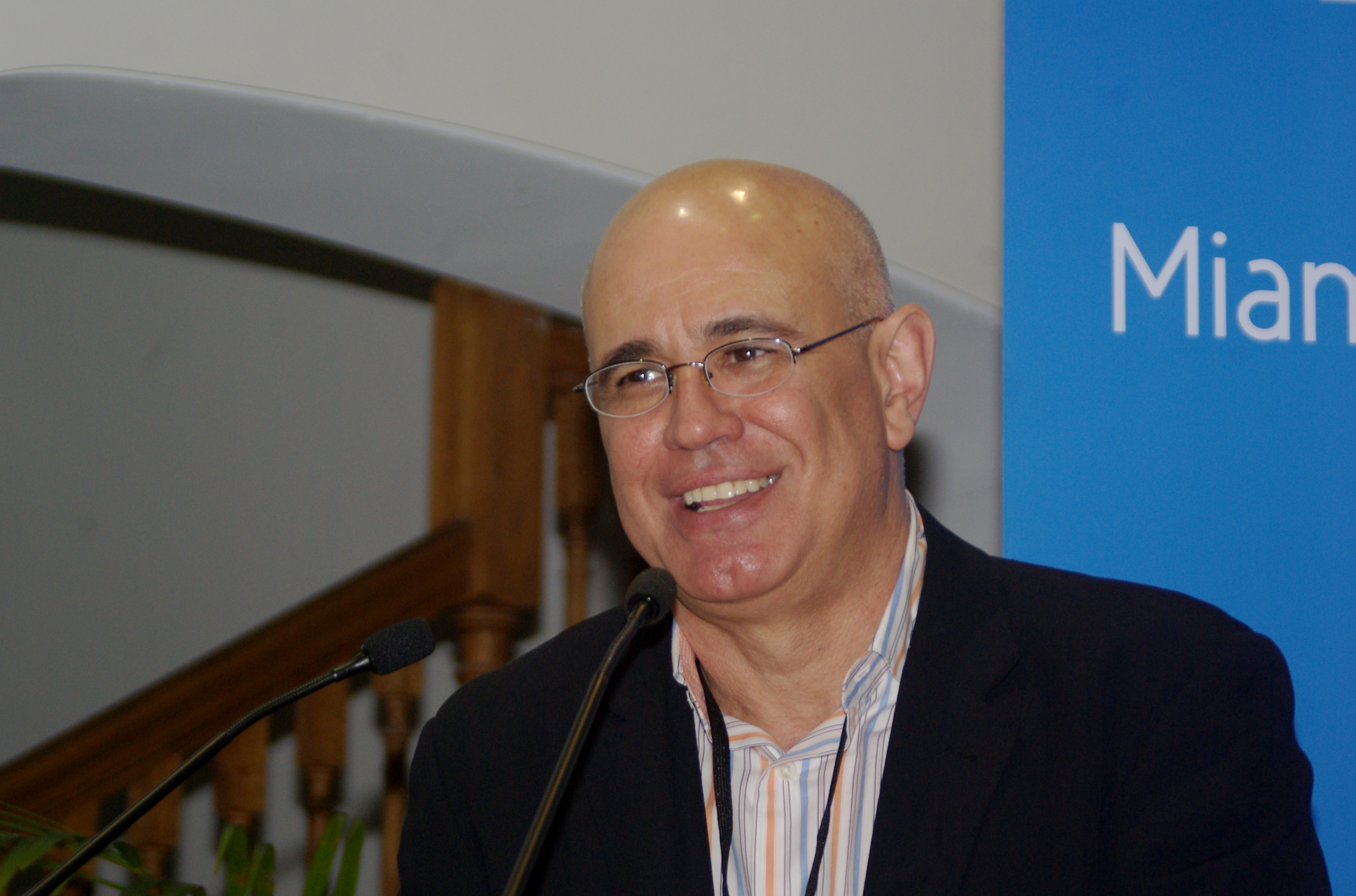
Rodríguez at the Miami Book Fair International 2014

Antonio Orlando Rodríguez (born 30 June 1956, Ciego de Ávila) is a Cuban writer, journalist and critic. Born in Havana, he studied journalism at the University of Havana. The author of numerous books for children and young adults, he also writes literary fiction for adults. He won the Alfaguara Prize for his 2008 novel Chiquita, based on the life of Espiridiona Cenda.
