= List of Cuban-American writers =

Name	Year of birth/death	Portrait	Notes
Agustin Blazquez	1944–2022		Author of THE KILLER FLIES OF LUXOR: Partial Autobiography. Travel Chronicles. Dreams. Fantasies. 2023 publisher/imprint Penny-a-Page Press A collection of his essays was published in collaboration with Carlos Wotzkow by Alexandria Library under the Title Cubriendo y Descubriendo/Covering and Discovering (2001). He also did the English Translation for Luise Grave de Peralta Morel's The Mafia of Havana: The Cuban Cosa Nostra (2002).
Luis Senarens	1865–1939		The most popular American science fiction writer of the late 19th century, widely known as "the American Jules Verne."
Alex Abella	1950–		Mystery/crime novelist, non-fiction writer, and journalist
Iván Acosta			Playwright; works include El Super (movie version 1979) and Un cubiche en la luna (1989)
Mercedes de Acosta	1893–1968		
Robert Arellano	1969–		Novelist; works include Havana Lunar (2010 Edgar Award finalist) and Havana Libre (2017).
Reinaldo Arenas	1943–1990		
René Ariza	1940–1994		
Octavio Armand	1946–		Poet
Joaquín Badajoz	1972–		Poet, author, essayist (North American Academy of the Spanish Language, fellow member)
Jesús J. Barquet			
José Barreiro	1948–		
Ruth Behar	1956–		
Juana Borrero	1877–1896		Poet
Gaspar Betancourt Cisneros	1803–1866		
Richard Blanco	1968–		American poet, public speaker, author and civil engineer
Rafael Campo	1964–		Physician and author
Yanitzia Canetti	1967–		
Alejo Carpentier	1904–1980		
Lourdes Casal	1938–1981		Poet
Sandra M. Castillo			Poet
Carlota Caulfield			Poet, academic, author of A Mapmaker’s Diary, Ticket to Ride, At the Paper Gates with Burning Desire.
Daína Chaviano	1957–		Novelist, poet, and award-winning novelist of Azorín Prize for Best Novel (Spain), among other international awards.
Migdia Chinea-Varela	1971–		
Rene Cifuentes			
Miguel Correa			
Nilo Cruz	1960–		Playwright
Silvia Curbelo	1955–		
Belkis Cuza Malé	1942–		
Frederick A. de Armas	1945–		Literary scholar and novelist; novels include El abra del Yumurí (2016), Sinfonía Salvaje (2019)
Miguel A. De La Torre	1958–		
Carmen Agra Deedy			
Pura del Prado	1931–1996		
Carlos Eire	1950–		Memoirist
Margarita Engle	1951–		
Frank Fernández	1934–		
Roberto G. Fernández	1951–		
Eugenio Florit	1903–1999		
María Irene Fornés	1930–2018		
Paula Fox	1923–2017		
Carlos Franqui	1921–2010		
Cristina García	1958–		
Carolina Garcia-Aguilera	1949–		
Miguel Garcia Ramos			
Valentina L. Garza			
Jorge Enrique González Pacheco	1969–		Poet
Ibis Gómez-Vega	1952–		Novelist
Celedonio González			Novelist; works include Los primos (1971) and Los cuatro embajadores (1973)
Lillian Guerra			Historian; works include The Myth of José Martí: Conflicting Nationalisms in Early Twentieth-Century Cuba (2005) and Visions of Power in Cuba: Revolution, Redemption and Resistance, 1959-1971 (2012)
Jorge Guitart			Poet
Andrea O'Reilly Herrera			Novelist, academic
Oscar Hijuelos	1951–2013		
Daniel Iglesias Kennedy	1950–		Novelist, academic, author of Esta tarde se pone el sol(2001) Espacio vacío (2003) El marmitón apacible (2006) among others.
Enrique Labrador Ruiz	1902–1991		
Robert Lima	1935–		Poet, playwright and literary critic; grandson of Cuban patriot Col. Alfredo Lima Tardiff
Melinda Lopez			Playwright
Eduardo Machado	1953–		
José Martí	1853–1895		
Dionisio D. Martinez	1956–		
Pablo Medina	1960–		Poet
Ana Menéndez	1970–		
Matías Montes Huidobro	1931–2022		Novelist; works include Desterrados al fuego (1975)
Gean Moreno	1972–		
Elías Miguel Muñoz	1954–		Poet and novelist, author of Crazy Love (1988) and The Greatest Performance (1991), as well as works in Spanish
Victor Nickolich	1951–		Non-fiction writer, historian and athlete. His works include The Lynx Book (2016) and the Spanish version El Lince (2018)
Anaïs Nin	1903–1977		
Lino Novás Calvo	1903–1983		Novelist; works include Maneras de contar (1970)
Ana Rosa Núñez	1926–1999		Poet, librarian
Achy Obejas	1956–		
Mirta Ojito			
Herberto Padilla	1932–2000		
Ricardo Pau-Llosa	1954–		Poet
Luis de la Paz			
Manuel Pereiras García	1950–		
Gustavo Pérez Firmat	1949–		"Poet, memoirist, literary critic"
Carlos Pintado	1974–		Author, playwright and award-winning poet of Sant Jordi International Prize for Poetry
Juana Rosa Pita	1939–		
Dolores Prida	1943–2013		Playwright; English-language works include those collected in Beautiful Señoritas and Other Plays (1991)
Jorge Reyes	1972–2015		
Beatriz Rivera			Novelist
Isel Rivero			Poet
Cecilia Rodríguez Milanés			Poet, academic
Enrique Sacerio-Garí	1945–		Author of Poemas interreales, Para llegar a La Habana, and El mercado de la memoria
Antonio Sacre	1968–		
José Sánchez-Boudy			Poet
Pedro Santacilia	1826–1910		
Armando Simon	1951–		Novelist-A Cuban from Kansas, Very Peculiar Stories, The Cult of Suicide and Other SciFi Stories. Dramatist-Conundrum, Pro Se, Carnada, Infidel!
Virgil Suárez	1962–		Novelist, poet
Piri Thomas	1928–2011		
Miguel Teurbe Tolón	1820–1857		
Omar Torres			Novelist; works include Apenas un bolero (1981), Al partir (1986), and Fallen Angels Sing (1991)
Alisa Valdes-Rodriguez	1969–		
Roberto Valero			
Félix Varela	1788–1853		
Charlie Vázquez	1971–		
Dan Vera			
Carlos Victoria			
Cirilo Villaverde	1812–1894		
Rubén Martínez Villena	1899–1934		
José Yglesias	1919–1995		
Juan Clemente Zenea	1832–1871		

== See also ==
- Cuban American literature
- List of Cuban writers
- List of Cuban women writers
- List of Cuban Americans
- Before Columbus Foundation

== Bibliography ==
- Carolina Hospital; Jorge Cantera, eds. (1996). A Century of Cuban Writers in Florida: Selected Prose and Poetry. Sarasota: Pineapple Press. ISBN 978-1-56164-104-8. (Anthology; includes writer biographies)
- Virgil Suárez; Delia Poey, eds. (1996). Little Havana Blues: a Cuban-American Literature Anthology. Houston: Arte Público Press. ISBN 978-1-61192-207-3. (Anthology; includes writer biographies)
- Isabel Álvarez Borland (1998). Cuban–American Literature of Exile: From Person to Persona. University of Virginia Press.
- Rodrigo Lazo (2005). Writing to Cuba: Filibustering and Cuban Exiles in the United States. Envisioning Cuba. University of North Carolina Press. ISBN 0807829307.
- Ricardo L. Ortíz (2013). "Canons: Cuban-American Literature". In Suzanne Bost; Frances R. Aparicio (eds.). Routledge Companion to Latino/a Literature. Routledge. pp. 413–422. ISBN 978-1-136-22160-6.
