= Carolina García =

Carolina García may refer to:

- Carolina García (field hockey), Chilean field hockey player
- Carolina García (executive), Argentine film executive
- Carolina García Cañón, Mexican politician

== See also ==
- Caroline Garcia, French tennis player
- Carolina Garcia-Aguilera, American writer
- Carolyn Garcia, American Merry Prankster and former wife of Jerry Garcia
