= Dionisio D. Martinez =

Cuban-born poet

Dionisio D. Martinez (born 7 April 1956), is a Cuban-born poet who grew up speaking Spanish, raised first in Spain, then in the United States.

His work has appeared in American Poetry Review, Denver Quarterly, Georgia Review, Iowa Review, Kenyon Review, New Republic, Poetry, Prairie Schooner, Virginia Quarterly Review.

He lives in Tampa, Florida.

== Awards ==
- 1993 Whiting Award
- 1997 National Endowment for the Arts Fellowship
- 1998 Guggenheim Fellowship
- 1999 National Poetry Series, for Climbing Back

== Works ==
=== Books ===
- Dancing at the Chelsea. State Street Press. 1992. (chapbook)
- History as a Second Language. Ohio State University Press. 1993. ISBN 978-0-8142-0592-1.
- Bad Alchemy. W.W. Norton & Company. 1995. ISBN 978-0-393-31531-8.
- Climbing Back. W.W. Norton & Company. 2000. ISBN 978-0-393-05006-6.

=== Poems ===
- "Belated Valentine for Alina", Virginia Quarterly Review, Winter 1995
- "Rest before you sleep", Poetry (September 2008)
- "Tipping over the actuarial tables", Poetry Foundation

== See also ==
- Cuban American literature
- List of Cuban-American writers
