= Américo Mendoza Mori =

Harvard scholar from Peru; language activist

- Born: Ica, Peru
- Occupations: scholar, language activist
- Employer: Harvard University

Américo Mendoza Mori (born 1987, Ica, Peru) is a Peruvian scholar. He has contributed to the fields of Latin American Studies, Latino/a Studies, and Quechua languages. He teaches at Harvard University.

== Career ==
Mendoza Mori studied literature at Universidad Nacional Mayor de San Marcos in Lima, Peru. Following this, he obtained a Ph.D. at the University of Miami, Florida. His research and advocacy on Andean culture have been featured by United Nations, The New York Times, National Public Radio, among other organizations. He previously taught at University of Pennsylvania where he was the founding coordinator of the Quechua language program. Mendoza Mori was the cultural consultant for the incorporation of Southern Quechua dialogues in the film Dora and the Lost City of Gold (2019) by Paramount Pictures.

== Works ==
- Mendoza Mori, Américo (2017), Quechua Language programs in the United States: Cultural hubs for Indigenous cultures, Chiricú Journal: Latino Literatures, Arts and Cultures, Vol.2 (Spring 2017).
- Mendoza Mori, Américo; Liendo, Laura (2011), Panel A-L: Reflexiones sobre literatura y discursos de América Latina, Lima, Peru: Red Literaria Peruana .
- Mendoza Mori, Américo (2010), «Es el mismo Inca? Figura del Inca en la Nueva Corónica de Guamán Poma de Ayala y Los Comentarios Reales de Garcilaso de la Vega», Actas del Congreso "Las Palabras de Garcilaso", Lima, Peru: Organización de Estados Iberoamericanos - OEI, Academia Peruana de la Lengua.
