= Sandra M. Castillo =

American poet

- Born: April 29, 1962 (age 64); Havana, Cuba
- Education: Florida State University
- Known for: Being a poet and a professor

Sandra M. Castillo is a poet and South Florida resident. She was born in Havana, Cuba and emigrated on one of the last of President Lyndon B. Johnson's Freedom Flights. Castillo's family's number for the Freedom Flights was 160,633. Sandra Castillo is not only a poet, but also a professor at Miami Dade College and she teaches in the History Department.

She attended Florida State University, receiving both a Bachelor's and ultimately master's degree in Creative Writing.

[Castillo has said that she is haunted by all things Cuban and that much of what she remembers about her Cuban childhood, those eight years of her life, linger in her memory like photographs, like ghosts. Her Tio Berto, to whom she has made repeated references, was an amateur photographer whose photographs documented not only her family's past but a Cuban life. Such photographs captivated her and "formed the basis of [her] aesthetic."] She writes about loss, history, gender, language and explores issues of memory. Her work "depicts contradictory worlds, the memory of a homeland and memory politics while examining the ordinary reality of exile. Her poetry is inspired by her childhood experiences, photographs, stories told by her family, arrests, and the streets and lives left behind in Cuba. She is inspired by poets like Jack Kerouac and the Chilean poet, Omar Lara. Similarly, her and Jack Kerouac "are fascinated by the history of place", and she was inspired by his attempt to "shape and define his world through his adopted language." Omar Lara's "ability to capture time and place at a critical time" inspired her to write a poem called, photograph.

== Bibliography ==
Her work has appeared in various literary magazines, including: Puerto del Sol, Lake Effect, Borderlands, Texas Poetry Review, Nimrod International Journal, Gulf Stream, The Florida Review, The Southeast Review, and Tigertail, A South Florida Poetry Annual, as well as in various anthologies including: Paper Dance: 52 Latino Poets, A Century of Cuban-American Writers in Florida, Little Havana Blues, Touching the Fire: Fifteen Poets of Today's Latino Renaissance, Cool Salsa: On Growing Up Latino in the U.S., Like Thunder: Poets Respond to Violence in America, American Diaspora: the poetry of displacement and Burnt Sugar Cana Quemada: Contemporary Cuban Poetry in English and Spanish.

Her chapbook entitled Red Letters was published by Apalachee Press in 1991.

Her bilingual poetry book, “Eating Moors and Christians.” where she uses food to speak about colonialism.

Her collection entitled My Father Sings to My Embarrassment (White Pine Press, 2002), was selected by Cornelius Eady who called Castillo "A tough, clear-eyed poet who is willing to gamble with passion (thank God!!) in order to get the poem where it needs to go."

In My Father Sings to My Embarrassment, Castillo delves into her Cuban childhood, and we follow her family as they "start over without a language." The poems chronicle the visit of a Cuban uncle, who is surrounded by relatives that "twenty years and English have turned into strangers," and Castillo's bittersweet return to her homeland: "Even a map cannot show you the way back to a place that no longer exists."

== See also ==
- Cuban American literature
- List of Cuban-American writers
