= Roberto Valero =

Cuban poet, novelist, and educator

- Born: 1955; Matanzas, Matanzas Province, Cuba
- Died: September 23, 1994 (aged 38–39); Washington, DC, U.S.
- Occupations: Poet; novelist; professor
- Spouse: Maria Badias Valero
- Writing career
- Period: 1980–1994
- Genres: poetry, novel

Roberto Valero (1955 – September 23, 1994) was a Cuban poet, novelist, and educator.

== Life ==
Roberto Valero was born in Matanzas Province. He attended the University of Havana before leaving Cuba during the Mariel Boatlift in 1980.

He received his Ph.D. from Georgetown University and taught at George Washington University.

Along with Reinaldo Arenas and Reinaldo Garcia Ramos, Valero created the seminal Mariel journal.

He was the 1989 recipient of the Letras de Oro Literary Prize from the University of Miami for his book on Reinaldo Arenas.

Valero's work has been compared to that of Federico García Lorca.

Valero also published under the pseudonym of "Julio Real".

== Writings ==
=== Poetry ===
- Desde un oscuro ángulo/From a Dark Angle (1982)
- En fin, la noche/At Last, the Night (1984)
- Dharma (1985) with an introduction by Eugenio Florit
- Venías/You Were Coming (1990)
- No estaré en tu camino/I Will Not Be On Your Path (1991)

=== Novels ===
- Este Viento De Cuaresma/This Lenten Wind (1994) with an introduction by Reinaldo Arenas

=== Criticiscm ===
- El Desamparado Humor De Reinaldo Arenas/The Homeless Humor of Reinaldo Arenas (1991)

== See also ==
- List of Cuban American writers
