= Latino studies =

Interdisciplinary academic field

Latino studies is an academic discipline which studies the experience of people of Latin American ancestry in the United States. Closely related to other ethnic studies disciplines such as African-American studies, Asian American studies, and Native American studies, Latino studies critically examines the history, culture, politics, issues, sociology, spirituality (Indigenous) and experiences of Latino people. Drawing from numerous disciplines such as sociology, history, literature, political science, religious studies and gender studies, Latino studies scholars consider a variety of perspectives and employ diverse analytical tools in their work.

== Origins of Latino studies ==
In academia, Latino studies stemmed from the development of Chicana/o studies and Puerto Rican studies programs in response to demands articulated by student movements in the late 1960s in the United States. These movements unfolded amid a nationwide climate of heightened social and political activism, incited by opposition to the Vietnam War, the American Feminist movement, and the Civil Rights Movement.

At some institutions of higher education in the United States, the 1970s and 1980s saw the consolidation of Latino studies as an autonomous discipline while other institutions chose to maintain Chicano and Puerto Rican studies programs—reflecting a diversity of institutional responses to the nascent academic discipline.

Debates on the academic and institutional location of Latino studies continue to present day: while some scholars strive to maintain Chicano and Puerto Rican studies programs that explore the exceptionality of national experiences, in the context of a globalizing Latino diaspora and diversifying Latino student populations at U.S. universities, many others support the notion of Latino studies as an "umbrella" field designed to explore pan-Latino experiences and histories that transcend nation-bound analytical frameworks introduced by pioneering Chicano and Puerto Rican studies programs. Yet others advocate for the absorption of Latino studies into broader comparative disciplines such as ethnic studies, American studies, and Latin American studies. Accordingly, the status of Latino studies significantly differs from institution to institution in terms of nomenclature, pedagogical practice, and disciplinary location—with examples ranging from degree-granting autonomous departments to interdisciplinary (and multidisciplinary) programs to university-affiliated research centers.

=== Chicano studies ===
The first Chicano studies program was established at California State University, Los Angeles (CSULA) in Fall 1968 in response to demands articulated by student activism movements. Initially named the Mexican American Studies Program, the program was instituted at CSULA as the Chicano studies department in 1971. Similar initiatives developed simultaneously at other California universities. In 1969 at a statewide conference held at the University of California, Santa Barbara, Chicano students, activists and scholars drafted the Plan de Santa Bárbara a 155-page manifesto for the implementation of Chicano studies in institutions of higher education in California. While the Regents of the University of California did not formally adopt the manifesto as an institutional mandate, it served as a blueprint for the establishment of Chicano studies programs across public universities in the state. However, in calling for the establishment of comprehensive Chicano studies programs—including departments, research centers, a Chicano studies library—and recommending the adoption of a host of institutional practices, many California universities implemented only certain elements of the plan.

While Chicano studies programs proliferated across campuses in California, Texas-based institutions also played pivotal roles in development of early Chicano studies programs, including the Center for Mexican American studies at the University of Texas at Austin in 1970 and the Center for Mexican American studies (CMAS) at the University of Texas at Arlington founded in 1993.

=== Puerto Rican studies ===
In 1969, a parallel wave of student activism took place at City University of New York (CUNY) south campus, spearheaded by the efforts of Puerto Rican and African American Students. These efforts culminated in the spring of 1969 when students staged the Open Admissions Strike. The students' central demand was the adoption of a non-competitive open admissions policy. The expanded admissions policy would, in effect, diversify the student body by guaranteeing placement at CUNY for all New York City high school graduates. In addition to demands for an open-admissions policy, student activists demanded academic programs in Black and Puerto Rican studies. In response, CUNY created the Department of Urban and Ethnic studies. With continuing student activism, the Department of Puerto Rican studies was formed in 1971, followed by the establishment of the Center for Puerto Rican studies as a university-based research institute in 1973. Student activism related to the demand for Puerto Rican studies was not limited to CUNY, and effervesced across New York public campuses including Brooklyn, Lehman, Queens and Bronx Community Colleges.

== New directions in Latino studies ==
As Chicano and Puerto Rican studies programs stemmed largely (but not exclusively) from the east and west coasts, institutions in the American Midwest pioneered some of the first academic departments with a multinational or transnational Latino studies focus. These programs included the Center for Chicano-Boricua studies at Wayne State University (established in 1972) and the Chicano-Boriqueño studies program (now the Latino studies program) at Indiana University (established in 1976).

Throughout the 1980s and 1990s, dozens of universities across the country followed suit and established academic programs and departments (see list of major departments) in Latino studies. The 1980s and 1990s also saw the emergence of a number of research initiatives and professional societies dedicated to the advancement of a Latino studies research agenda. These initiatives including fellowships offered by the Ford, Rockefeller, Compton and Mellon Foundations and the establishment of research institutes including The InterUniversity Project on Latino Research, the Tomás Rivera Policy Institute and the Julian Samora Research Institute.

== Debate on the location of Latino studies within institutions of higher education ==
The location of Latino studies within institutions of higher education—in terms of disciplinary boundaries, but also with regard to the field's perceived legitimacy as an academic discipline and field of scholarship—is contested. In Decolonizing American Spanish, Jeffrey Herlihy-Mera argues that US higher education "best practices" make the university not "a neutral institution but as one of the main levers of political and social power that supports the misrecognition of Spanish as foreign in the United States." He comments that "The academic foreignization directs literacy itself toward English and away from Spanish in a way that pushes many communities toward political and social obligations that shape not only literacy and graduation rates but also access to public funds, democratic participation, and the nature of belonging and citizenship.” As Spanish and Spanish-language cultures are "externalized as 'foreign,' such cultures and languages are commonly conceptualized as non-generative, ungrammatical, impure, and/ or contaminated—and thus invalid vis-à- vis their equivalents in Spain. While these local cultures have profound histories, traditions, aesthetics, narratives, and myths, the structures of the academy require (if these materials appear in pedagogy, which does not regularly occur) that they be studied, recognized, and institutionalized as minor and unimportant in comparison to Spain.”

=== Criticisms of Latino studies and Ethnic studies ===
While Latino studies is sometimes encompassed under the umbrella of ethnic studies, the discipline's course of development in different areas of the United States has been shaped by regional demographics, including the demographic composition of a college campus' student body. In the case of Latino studies, the American northeast and southwest have served as especially salient battlegrounds for these debates to unfold.

Staunch critics of ethnic studies programs include Ward Connerly, former University of California Regent, who was involved in the successful effort to ban affirmative action in California places of employment and higher education in 1996 with California Proposition 209. Connerly accused ethnic studies programs of being "divisive" and balkanizing.

More recently, Latino studies faced legal challenges in Arizona with House Bill 2120 which (echoing the Arizona ban on ethnic studies effectuated in Tucson public schools in 2011) sought to prohibit public universities in the state from activities and classes including those that "promote division, resentment or social justice toward a race, gender, religion, political affiliation, social class or other class of people"; "are designed primarily for students of a particular ethnic group"; or "advocate solidarity or isolation based on ethnicity, race, religion, gender or social class instead of the treatment of students as individuals." (On January 17, 2017 Arizona House Education Committee Chairman Paul Boyer denied a hearing, effectively killing the bill.)

=== Disciplinary positioning of Latino studies ===
Among scholars and administrators in support of Latino studies and other ethnic studies programs, opinions are divided on the positioning, status and definition of Latino studies within institutions of higher education. These debates arise from theoretical and epistemological inquiry but also from concerns surrounding funding and institutional support for university departments and academic programs.

In the late 1990s, at the height of tensions between nationality-specific programs like Chicano studies and Puerto Rican studies and nascent pan-Latino studies programs, Ignacio Garcia (professor of Western American studies at Brigham Young University) advocated for the autonomous departmental status of Chicano studies—posing the emergence of Latino studies as a challenge to that ideal. In his 1996 essay "Juncture in the Road: Chicano Studies since 'El Plan de Santa Barbara", Garcia argued:

"Many centers find themselves challenged by non- Chicano Latino scholars who want to promote their scholarly interests. They argue that all Latino groups have a common experience with racism and poverty in American society. Also, programs which emphasize the inclusive Hispanic approach are more likely to gain research and support funds more easily. Because immigration has been a major area of study for Chicano Studies and because the immigrant groups are now more diverse among numerous Latino groups, there is an intellectual challenge to Chicano Studies to become inclusive or else to be seen as shallow and exclusionary."

At the turn of the 21st century, scholars including Frances Aparicio (professor of Spanish and Portuguese and director of the Latina and Latino studies program at Northwestern University), Pedro Cabán (Professor and Chair of the Department of Latin American, Caribbean & U.S. Latino studies at SUNY Albany), and Juan Flores (former Professor of Social and Cultural Analysis and director of Latino studies at New York University)—argued in support of an interdisciplinary Latino studies field of scholarship with a transnational focus.

In his 1999 essay "New Concepts, New Contexts," Juan Flores—an advocate for the freestanding autonomy of Latino studies departments—described the potential "dilution" or "distortion" of the field when subsumed into umbrella departments. Flores identified that at a time when many public universities were being consolidated, Latino studies programs were blossoming at private universities across the country. Nonetheless, recognizing political and pragmatic concerns, Flores recommended that departmental status should be evaluated on a "case-by-case" basis in order to best place the discipline according to the needs and demands of a particular institutional environment.

Pedro Cabán considered the tensions and contradictions between Latino studies as a discipline borne from student activism and institutional demands placed upon the discipline, writing:

If deployed uncritically, the Latino label can result in sanitizing a history of political activism and critical engagement that is the legacy of the struggles of the 1960s ... if Latino studies programs are to be successful and relevant to legions of students, they will need to retain the normative values that defined their transformative goals, and obtain the academic authority that traditional disciplines possess (hiring, promotion and tenure, curriculum development, discretion over budgets, etc.)

Reflecting upon Latino studies programs existent in 1999, Aparicio warned that the ideal of interdisciplinarity is often unfulfilled, arguing that Latino studies programs are often multidisciplinary aggregates of nationally-bounded scholarship: "Latino studies programs are constituted by a list of courses discrete in their national and disciplinary boundaries that add up to lo latino."

== Theoretical influences ==
Early Chicano studies and Puerto Rican studies programs developed in a parallel fashion: both emerged from activist struggles, developed within nation-bound analytical frameworks and drew influences from economic liberation, antiracism, and critical consciousness theories.

However, Pedro Cabán argues that the two schools of thought differed in one significant way: "Whereas the Chicano historiography and the emerging social science literature primarily explored the Chicano experience in the US, early Puerto Rican Studies was heavily invested in reinterpreting the economic history of Puerto Rico under US colonial domination."

In the 1980s and 1990s, newly formed Latino studies programs tended to emphasize interdisciplinarity and transnationalism. A number of pre-existing programs were restructured, consolidated or renamed to encompass this broader scope. Scholars in the field have identified the 1990s as a turning point in the discipline's history, as scholarship shifted away from "male-centered nationalistic discourse" and became increasingly influenced by intersectional identity formation theory, including feminist and queer theory.

== List of scholarly and academic journals ==
- The Hispanic Outlook in Higher Education (founded 1990)
- El Andar: A National Magazine for Latino Discourse (founded 1998)
- Journal of Hispanic Higher Education (founded 2002)
- Journal of Latinos and Education (founded 2002)
- Latino Studies (founded 2003)
- Journal of Latino-Latin American Studies, formerly Latino Studies Journal (founded 2005)
- Latino(a) Research Review (founded 1995; publication suspended since 2010)
- Journal of Latina/o Psychology (founded 2012)
- CENTRO Journal (published continuously since 1987 by the Center for Puerto Rican Studies)

== Major programs, departments and research institutes ==
The following is a working list of programs throughout the United States associated with "Latino Studies" in chronological order of establishment. In cases of name changes, the order reflects the date of establishment of the program's first iteration. Programs with no date of establishment listed on their homepage are located at the end of the list.

- Department of Latina/Latino Studies at San Francisco State University, originally established as the Department of Chicano Studies in 1969 within the newly instituted College of Ethnic Studies. The name was quickly changed to "La Raza Studies" followed by "Raza Studies" in 1999, finally gaining its present title in 2011.
- Department of Latino and Hispanic Caribbean Studies at Rutgers University, originally established as the Program in Puerto Rican Studies in 1970 in response to student demands, which soon became the Department of Puerto Rican Studies in 1973. Subsequent name changes included: Department of Puerto Rican and Hispanic Caribbean Studies (mid-1980s), Department of Latino and Hispanic Caribbean Studies (2005-2006), followed by Department of Latino and Caribbean Studies as of January 2016. The department offers an undergraduate major and minor.
- Department of Latin American and Latino Studies, University of California - Santa Cruz, originally established in 1971 as the Program in Latin American Studies. In 1994, the program name changed to its current title, and in 2001, the program gained departmental status. The department offers an undergraduate major and minor, in addition to a Ph.D. program (see following section).
- Department of Chicano and Latino Studies at the University of Minnesota, originally established as the Department of Chicano Studies in 1971/1972. Adopting its current title in 2012, the department offers an undergraduate major and minor.
- The Center for Latino/a and Latin American Studies at Wayne State University, established in 1972 as the Center for Chicano-Boriqueño Studies. The program offers an undergraduate two-year core curriculum program and a co-major.
- Latino Studies Program at Indiana University, originally established as the Chicano-Boriqueño Studies Program in 1976. The program became the Latino Studies Program in 1999, offering an undergraduate minor and a Ph.D. minor.
- Latina/Latino Studies Program at the University of Michigan - Ann Arbor, established in 1984. The program offers an undergraduate major and minor, as well as a graduate certificate.
- Department of Latin American, Caribbean and U.S. Latino Studies at the University at Albany, SUNY, established in 1984. The department offers an undergraduate major and minor, as well as a MA, Ph.D. and certificate graduate programs.
- Latino Studies Program at Cornell University, established in 1987. The program offers an undergraduate minor and a graduate minor.
- El Instituto: Institute of Latina/o, Caribbean and Latin American Studies at the University of Connecticut, originally established in 1994 as the Institute of Puerto Rican and Latino Studies. In 2012, El Instituto was inaugurated, merging the former Institute of Puerto Rican Studies with the Center for Latin American and Caribbean Studies. El Instituto offers undergraduate BA and graduate MA concentrations.
- Department of Latina/Latino Studies at University of Illinois - Urbana-Champaign, established in 1996. The department offers an undergraduate minor and major, as well as a graduate minor.
- Institute for Latino Studies at the University of Notre Dame, established in 1999. The Institute offers an undergraduate supplementary major and minor.
- Latino Studies at Millersville University, established in 2003. The program offers an undergraduate minor.
- Latina/o Studies Program at Northwestern University, established in 2008. The program offers an undergraduate major and minor.
- Program in Latino Studies at Princeton University, established in 2009. The program offers an undergraduate certificate.
- Latino/Latina/Latin American Studies at Rochester Institute of Technology. The program offers an undergraduate minor.
- Department of Chicano/Latino Studies at the University of California, Irvine. The department offers an undergraduate major, minor and certificate, as well as a graduate emphasis.
- Department of Latin American and Latina/o Studies at John Jay College of Criminal Justice (at CUNY). The Department offers an undergraduate major and minor.
- Latino/a Studies Program at Williams College. The program offers an undergraduate concentration.
- Latino Studies Program at New York University. Located in the Department of Social and Cultural Analysis, the program offers an undergraduate major and minor.
- Latin American and Latino Studies Program at the University of Pennsylvania. The program offers an undergraduate major and minor.
- Mexican American and Latina/o Studies at the University of Texas, Austin. The program offers an undergraduate major, minor, and certificate.

== Doctoral programs ==
- Ph.D. in Latin American and Latino Studies at the University of California, Santa Cruz
- Ph.D. in Latin American, Caribbean, and U.S. Latino Cultural Studies at the State University of New York (SUNY) at Albany
- Ph.D. in Chicano/Latino Studies at Michigan State University
- Ph.D. Program in Mexican American and Latina/o Studies at the University of Texas at Austin

== Research institutes and consortiums ==
- Center for Mexican American Studies (CMAS) at the University of Texas at Arlington, founded in 1993.
- Center for Latino Policy Research at the University of California - Berkeley, established in 1988.
- Hispanic Research Center at Arizona State University, established in 1989.
- Center for Latino Initiatives at the Smithsonian Institution, established in 1998.
- Center for Latin American and Latino Studies at American University, established in 2010.
- New England Consortium of Latina/o Studies
- Center for Puerto Rican Studies, established in 1973.
- Latino Research Institute at University of Texas, Austin, established 2015

Also see: Programs and Departments in Chicana/o Studies

== Notable scholars ==
- Frederick Luis Aldama (1969), The Ohio State University Latino scholar, distinguished professor of English and Latino studies.
- Gloria E. Anzaldúa (1942–2004), Chicana Studies scholar, writer and activist.
- Frances Aparicio (born 1955), Professor of Latina/Latino Studies at Northwestern University.
- Juan Bruce–Novoa (1944–2010), formerly professor of Spanish and Portuguese literatures and cultures at University of California, Irvine
- C. Ondine Chavoya (born 1970), professor of art history within Latina/o and Chicano/a studies, and queer studies at Williams College and the University of Texas at Austin
- Arlene Davila (born 1965), Professor of Anthropology and Social and Cultural Analysis at New York University.
- Juan Flores (1943-2014), Professor of Africana and Puerto Rican–Latino Studies at CUNY (City University of New York) Hunter College, and Professor of Sociology at the CUNY Graduate Center. Former director of CUNY's Center for Puerto Rican Studies.
- Jorge Majfud (born 1969) Professor of Latin American Studies at Jacksonville University, Florida
- Silvia Mazzula (born 1974), Associate Professor of Psychology at John Jay College of Criminal Justice and Founding Executive Director of Latina Researchers Network.
- Suzanne Oboler, Professor of Latin American and Latina/o Studies at John Jay College. Founding Editor of the journal, Latino Studies.
- Américo Paredes (1915–1999), formerly Dickson, Allen, and Anderson Centennial professor at the University of Texas at Austin
- Gustavo Pérez Firmat (born 1949), David Feinson Professor in the Humanities at Columbia University.
- George I. Sánchez (1906–1972), formerly Professor of History at the University of Texas and President of LULAC.
- José David Saldívar, professor of comparative literature at Stanford University.
- Silvio Torres–Saillant, professor of English at Syracuse University and founder of the Dominican Studies Institute, City College, City University of New York (CUNY)
- Ilan Stavans (born 1961), Lewis-Sebring Professor in Latin American and Latino Culture at Amherst College.
- Luz Maria Umpierre (born 1947), Puerto Rican studies scholar, writer and advocate.
- Enrique Zone Andrews, Professor of Ministry and Hispanic Protestant Leadership at Azusa Pacific Graduate School of Theology, Azusa Pacific University.

== Books ==
- Allatson, Paul. Latino Dreams: Transcultural Traffic and the U.S. National Imaginary, Amsterdam and New York: Rodopi Press, 2002.
- Allatson, Paul. Key Terms in Latino/a Cultural and Literary Studies, Malden, MA and Oxford: Blackwell Press, 2007.
- Aparicio, Frances. Listening to Salsa: Gender, Latin Popular Music, and Puerto Rican Cultures CT: Wesleyan, 1998.
- Aparicio, Frances and Chávez-Silverman, Susana, eds. Tropicalizations: Transcultural Representations of Latinidad. Hanover and London: University Press of New England, 1997.
- Chávez Candelaria, Cordelia, et al., eds. Encyclopedia of Latino Popular Culture, 2 vols. Westport, CT, and London: Greenwood Press, 2004.
- Dalleo, Raphael, and Elena Machado Sáez. The Latino/a Canon and the Emergence of Post-Sixties Literature. NY: Palgrave Macmillan, 2007.
- Caminero-Santangelo, Marta. On Latinidad: U.S. Latino Literature and the Construction of Ethnicity. FL: University Press of Florida, 2007.
- Davila, Arlene. Latinos, Inc.: The Marketing and Making of a People, Berkeley CA: University of California Press, 2001.
- Flores, Juan.From Bomba to Hip-Hop, NY: Columbia University Press, 2000.
- Flores, Juan, and Renato Rosaldo, ed. A Companion to Latina/o Studies, Oxford: Wiley-Blackwell, 2007.
- Gonzalez, Juan. Harvest of Empire : A History of Latinos in America, NY: Penguin, 2000.
- Herlihy-Mera, Jeffrey. Decolonizing American Spanish : Eurocentrism and Foreignness in the Imperial Ecosystem. PA: University of Pittsburgh Press, 2022.
- MacDonald, Victoria-Maria, ed. Latino education in the United States: A narrated history from 1513–2000 (Springer, 2004).
- Negron-Muntaner, Frances. Boricua Pop. New York: NYU Press, 2004.
- Oboler, Suzanne. Ethnic Labels, Latino Lives: Identity and the Politics of (Re)Presentation in the United States. MN: University of Minnesota Press, 1995.
- Oboler, Suzanne, and Deena J. González, eds. The Oxford Encyclopedia of Latinos and Latinas in the United States, New York and Oxford: Oxford University Press, 2005.
- Perez-Firmat, Gustavo. Life on the Hyphen: The Cuban-American Way. TX: University of Texas Press, 1994.
- Stavans, Ilan. The Hispanic Condition: The Power of a People. NY: Harper Perennial, 1995.
- Suarez-Orozco, Marcelo, and Mariela Páez. Latinos: Remaking America. CA: University of California Press, 2002.

== See also ==
- American studies
- Chicano studies
- Ethnic studies
- Latine
- Latin American studies
- Native American studies
