= Yanitzia Canetti =

Cuban author, translator, and editor

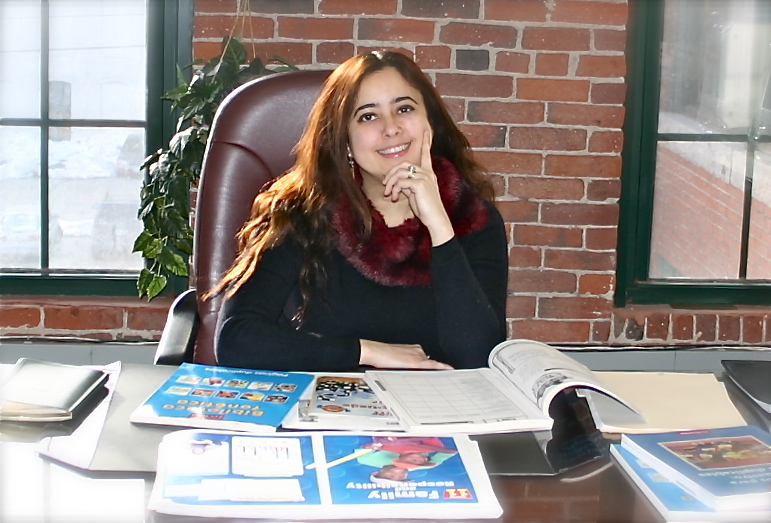
- Author Editor Yanitzia Canetti at her desk, 2008
- Born: 1967 (age 58–59); Havana, Cuba
- Occupations: writer, translator, editor
- Children: 2
- Awards: National Literature Award (Cuba) in 1984, 1985, 1986; White Rose Literature Award (Cuba) in 1994; Honorable Mention Award from the National Association of Hispanic Publications, California in 1997

Yanitzia Canetti (born 1967 in Havana City, Cuba) is a Cuban-American author, translator, editor, and professor. She has written over 300 books in various genres, including novels, poetry, short stories, essays, theatre, and children's books, as well as translating over 200 children's books into Spanish. She is also a visiting lecturer in Spanish at Salem State University, Massachusetts.

Canetti has received several awards for her work, including the National Literature Award (Ministry of Education, Cuba) in 1984, 1985, and 1986. She also won the White Rose Literature Award (Best Literature of the Year, Cuba) in 1994 and an Honorable Mention Award from the National Association of Hispanic Publications in California in 1997.

She currently resides with her two sons in Boston, Massachusetts.

== See also ==
- Cuban American literature
- List of Cuban-American writers
