= Giovanni Vignale =

- Born: 1957 (age 68–69); Napoli, Italy
- Education: Scuola Normale Superiore, University of Pisa Northwestern University
- Known for: Current Density Functional Theory, Spin Coulomb drag, Quantum Theory of the Electron Liquid, The Beautiful Invisible
- Scientific career
- Fields: Density Functional Theory, Condensed Matter Theory
- Workplaces: University of Missouri
- Doctoral advisor: Kundan S. Singwi
- Other academic advisors: Franco Bassani
- Website: http://faculty.missouri.edu/~vignaleg/

Giovanni Vignale is an Italian American physicist and Professor of Physics at the University of Missouri. Vignale is known for his work on density functional theory - a theoretical approach to the quantum many-body problem - and for several contributions to many-particle physics and spintronics. He is also the author of a monograph on the "Quantum Theory of the Electron Liquid" (with Gabriele F. Giuliani) and a book entitled "The Beautiful Invisible - Creativity, imagination, and theoretical physics".

== Life ==
Vignale was born in Naples, Italy, in 1957 and studied physics at the Scuola Normale Superiore in Pisa, where he graduated in 1979. He completed his Ph.D. at Northwestern University in 1984, with a thesis on "Collective modes, effective interactions and superconductivity in the electron-hole liquid". He was a postdoctoral researcher at the Max-Planck-Institute for Solid State Research in Stuttgart, Germany and at Oak Ridge National Laboratory in Oak Ridge, Tennessee, before joining the Department of Physics and Astronomy at the University of Missouri in 1988. He is Curators' Professor of Physics at the University of Missouri since 2006 and Fellow of the American Physical Society since 1997.

== Research contributions ==
Vignale is known for his contributions to density functional theory. In 1987 he formulated, in collaboration with Mark Rasolt, the current density functional theory for electronic systems in the presence of a static magnetic field. In 1996 he developed, with Walter Kohn (Nobel Laureate in Chemistry, 1998), the time-dependent current density functional theory for electronic systems subjected to time-dependent electromagnetic fields. He is also known for his contributions to spintronics: in 2000, with Irene D'Amico, he introduced the concept of spin Coulomb drag (experimentally observed in 2005). In 2003 he proposed, with Michael E. Flatte' of the University of Iowa, the theoretical concept for a unipolar spin diode and a unipolar spin transistor.

Vignale is co-author (with Gabriele F. Giuliani) of a monograph on the quantum electron liquid, which is used by students and researchers for reference and self-study. In 2011 he published a non-technical book "The Beautiful Invisible - Creativity, imagination, and theoretical physics", which presents theoretical physics as a form of art. In the introduction to this book he writes “A good scientific theory is like a symbolic tale, an allegory of reality. Its characters are abstractions that may not exist in reality; yet they give us a way of thinking more deeply about reality. Like a fine work of art, the theory creates its own world: it transforms reality into something else – an illusion perhaps, but an illusion that has more value than the literal fact.”

== Literary work ==
Giovanni Vignale is the author of several works of fiction and poetry. Some of his poems have been translated from English to Spanish by the renowned Cuban poet Juana Rosa Pita and are published in both languages in Time is Alive/El Tiempo Esta' Vivo. The dramatic quartet Odradek and Billy Bass Drink to the End of the World features four short plays patterned after the classic Japanese Noh drama form. About this book Juana Rosa Pita writes: "Suspended in space and time, his characters are pure abstractions, speaking devices, neither alive nor dead, in fact, not even human... Poetry, prose and drama conspire to make these plays an unforgettable reading experience".

=== Prose ===
- Odradek and Billy Bass Drink to the End of the World. El Zunzun Viajero, 2018
- Vite Scambiate. Cultura Duemila Editrice, 1993

=== Poetry ===
- Time is Alive/El tiempo esta' vivo. El Zunzun Viajero, 2019
