= Belkis Cuza Malé =

Cuban-American poet

- Born: 1942 (age 83–84); Guantánamo, Cuba
- Occupations: Writer, journalist, painter, editor
- Spouse: Heberto Padilla
- Children: María Josefina; Ernesto
- Writing career
- Genres: Poetry, prose
- Notable works: Tiempos de sol; Cartas a Ana Frank; Juego de damas

Belkis Cuza Malé (born 1942) is a Cuban-American writer, journalist, and painter, best known for her poetry.

== Biography ==
She studied literature at the University of Santiago de Cuba beginning in December 1964. After marrying her first husband, she moved to Havana and finished her schooling at the University of Havana. In 1965 she gave birth to her daughter María Josefina, "and soon after came the divorce."

It was at her first alma mater that she debuted as a poet, with the book El viento en la pared. This was published thanks to her professor, the Mexican Eraclio Cepeda, for the University of Santiago de Cuba's Department of Public Extension in 1962. That year she competed in Cuba's main literary event with Tiempos de sol, which received honorable mention for the Casa de las Américas Prize. She met the poet Heberto Padilla, who also received honorable mention in that competition (with El justo tiempo humano) and would become her partner five years later. The following year she repeated her success, obtaining another mention for the award with Cartas a Ana Frank.

She began to work as a journalist at Hoy in 1965, and afterward moved to the newspaper Granma, from which, she says, she was fired in 1967.

In 1966 she again saw Padilla, when he returned from Czechoslovakia, and at the end of the next year they began living together. They were officially married on 25 January 1971.

Although Cuza Malé worked for Granma, she says she never had "any revolutionary enthusiasm". About this time she says:

Hacía periodismo cultural, no iba al periódico más que a entregar mis artículos y andaba todo el tiempo entrevistando a escritores y artistas extranjeros que llegaban a Cuba. Creo que he entrevistado a todo el mundo, desde Alberto Moravia a Nicanor Parra, pasando por Martha Traba, Vargas Llosa, y a la mayoría de los poetas y novelistas españoles. Tampoco se salvaron pintores y teatristas. Y con algunos otros, como Julio Cortázar, tuve el privilegio de hablar y conversar sobre literatura varias veces. It was cultural journalism, not going to the newspaper other than to deliver my articles, and going around all the time interviewing writers and foreign artists who came to Cuba. I think I've interviewed everyone, from Alberto Moravia to Nicanor Parra, by way of Martha Traba, Mario Vargas Llosa, and the majority of the Spanish poets and novelists. Neither painters nor playwrights were spared. And with some others, like Julio Cortázar, I had the privilege of speaking and discussing literature several times.

Cuza Malé was arrested on 20 March 1971, following the recital given by Padilla in the Union of Writers, where he had read Provocaciones. Both were accused of "counterrevolutionary activities" against the government, but she was only held incommunicado for three days in the barracks of Villa Marista (Padilla was held for 37) and participated in the self-denouncement meeting held at the Union of Writers when her husband was released.

Her book Juego de damas was the third which received mention for the Casa de las Américas Prize (in 1968), an excerpt of which appeared in the anthology 8 poetas. In 1971, the already-published collection of poems from the Union of Writers and Artists of Cuba was destroyed due to the arrest of Cuza Malé and Padilla. It would be reissued 31 years later by Término Editorial of Cincinnati.

Cuza Malé's parents had abandoned Cuba in 1966 and lived in Miami. This allowed her, in 1979, to escape to the United States with Ernesto, the son she had had with Padilla, who at the time was six years old. The next year, thanks to international pressure and particularly the efforts of Senator Edward Kennedy, her husband was able to follow.

== Exile ==
At first, Cuza Malé stayed with her parents, but she later had to move, as the Cuban government warned that her husband would not be allowed to emigrate if she did not leave Miami. She opted to go to Elizabeth, New Jersey, to the house of her childhood friend Elkes Arjona. There she worked as an administrator in a Cuban clothing store, and later in other places, illegally, as she had tourist status and could not seek asylum for fear of reprisals that Cuba might take against Padilla and her daughter. (María Josefina was 13 years old when Cuza Malé left the island, and 18 years passed before she was able to see her again.)

In Princeton in 1982 – in collaboration with Padilla, who had initially opposed the idea – Cuza Malé founded Linden Lane Magazine, specializing in art and literature of Cubans in exile. In 1986, she founded the Cuban cultural center and art gallery La Casa Azul in Fort Worth, Texas, where she had moved. After the death of Padilla in 2000, this institution took his name in tribute to his memory. Cuza Malé had separated from the poet in 1995.

About religion and her mystical side, she explained in 2008:

Yo no sé nada de religiones afrocubanas, lo siento. Apenas si recuerdo haber visitado algún babalao en La Habana. Mi educación fue católica, y cuando más, visitaba alguna espiritista en Santiago, muy buena, por cierto. Lo mío es otra cosa. Lo espiritual, la metafísica, el mentalismo, la hipnosis, la sanación con las manos, el movimiento de la fe, cierto espiritismo, y todo lo que tenga que ver con lectura de la mente y visualización. Soy una cristiana, una seguidora del pensamiento del ministro Kenneth Copeland y su Movimiento de la Fe, que él promueve; creo que la Palabra de Dios lo puede todo (Hágase la luz, y la Luz se hizo), me alimento de la Biblia y de otros textos. Creo en el Espíritu Santo, en la Trinidad. No sé bien cómo, pero soy una "profeta" (según lo señala San Pablo en Corintios); una síquica para algunos; alguien que lee mentes, lee el "futuro" (que no existe, por cierto); pero sí "adivino" lo que el otro piensa y no dice. En fin, que ésta es también otra misión que parece me han dado. Ya ve, soy una consejera espiritual, pero distinta, una terapista del alma, como quiera llamarle. Creo en las energías y las vibraciones y creo que uno puede conseguir todo lo que quiere, si lo desea de verdad. Vivo en ese mundo. I don't know anything about Afro-Cuban religions, I'm afraid. I barely remember visiting some Babalao in Havana. My education was Catholic, and at most, visited some spiritualist in Santiago – very good indeed. Mine is something else. The spiritual, metaphysics, mentalism, hypnosis, healing hands, the movement of faith, true spiritualism, and everything that has to do with mind reading and viewing. I am a Christian, a follower of the minister Kenneth Copeland and the Faith Movement he promotes; I believe that God's Word can do everything (let there be light, and there was Light); I feed on the Bible and other texts. I believe in the Holy Spirit in the Trinity. I do not know how, but I am a "prophet" (as St. Paul says in Corinthians); a psychic for some; someone who reads minds, reads the "future" (which does not exist, by the way); but "guesses" what the other thinks and says. Anyway, this is another mission that I seem to have been given. You see, I am a spiritual counselor, but different – one therapist of the soul, however named. I believe in energies and vibration and think you can get everything you want, if you really do. I live in that world.

Cuza Malé resides in Fort Worth, Tx.

In addition to poetry, Cuza Malé has dabbled in fiction and has at least three unpublished novels.

== Awards and recognition ==
- Honorable Mention, 1962 Casa de las Américas Prize for Tiempos de sol
- Honorable Mention, 1963 Casa de las Américas Prize for Cartas a Ana Frank
- Honorable Mention, 1968 Casa de las Américas Prize for Juego de damas
- Keys of Miami for cultural work, 2011

== Works ==
=== Poetry ===
- El viento en la pared, Department of Public Extension of the University of Santiago de Cuba, 1962
- Los alucinados, 1962
- Tiempos de sol, Ediciones El Puente, Havana, 1963
- Cartas a Ana Frank, 1966
- Juego de damas, Union of Writers and Artists of Cuba, Havana, 1971 (destroyed); Término Editorial, Cincinnati, 2002
- Woman on the Front Lines, bilingual edition; translated: Pamela Carmell; selections of Juego de damas and El patio de mi casa (this last was the provisional title of the poetry collection that was eventually named La otra mejilla); Unicorn Press, Greensboro, 1987
- La otra mejilla, Ediciones ZV Lunáticas, Paris, 2007
- Los poemas de la mujer de Lot, Linden Lane Press, 2011

=== Other ===
- El clavel y la rosa: biografía de Juana Borrero, Cultura Hispánica, Madrid, 1984
- En busca de Selena, prose, 1997
- Elvis. The Unquiet Grave or the True Story of Jon Burrows, testimonial, E. Press, 1994
- Lagarto, lagarto. novel, Linden Lane Press, 2013
- Ermita. Jazmín y melaza, album/testimonial. Linden Lane Press, 2013
- Heberto Padilla. Puerta de Golpe, anthology compiled by Cuza Malé, Linden Lane Press, 2013

== See also ==
- Cuban American literature
- List of Cuban-American writers
