= Eduardo Machado =

American dramatist

- Born: Eduardo Oscar Machado; June 11, 1953 (age 73); Havana, Cuba
- Occupations: Playwright, theatre director, actor, teacher
- Spouse: Harriett Bradlin (separated)
- Writing career
- Period: Contemporary
- Notable works: Broken Eggs, Havana is Waiting, and The Cook
- Notable awards: Rockefeller Foundation Playwriting Award (1985)

Eduardo Oscar Machado (born June 11, 1953) is a Cuban playwright living in the United States. Notable plays by Machado include Broken Eggs, Havana is Waiting and The Cook. Many of his plays are autobiographical or deal with Cuba in some way. Machado teaches playwriting at New York University. He has served as the artistic director of the INTAR Theatre in New York City since 2004. He is openly gay.

== Biography ==
Eduardo Machado was born in Havana, Cuba, in 1953. He is the son of Othon (an accountant who died in 2007) and Gilda (Hernandez) Machado. With his brother Jesus he emigrated to the United States without his parents at the age of eight in 1961 as part of Operation Pedro Pan, which brought Cuban children to the United States in the early part of Fidel Castro's rule in Cuba. He lived with his aunt, uncle, and cousins in Hialeah, Florida until his parents were able to emigrate to California. While in California his parents had three more children, Jeanette, Gilda and Michelle. He is still a Cuban citizen, and has held a U.S. green card since he emigrated.

Machado started acting professionally in California at the age of 17 and became a member of the Screen Actors Guild at 20. He studied acting in Van Nuys, CA with David Alexander. He started writing plays under the tutelage of María Irene Fornés in 1980, and moved to New York City in 1981.

Machado first returned to Cuba in 1999 and has returned to Cuba several times since then. He has taught playwriting at Columbia University, where he was the head of the graduate playwriting program, and he now teaches at New York University, where he is head of playwriting.

== Works ==
=== Plays ===
- Rosario And The Gypsies, produced at The Ensemble Studio Theater, NY, 1982.
- They Still Mambo In The Streets of Rio, produced at The Ensemble Studio Theater, Los Angeles, CA, 1982.
- The Modern Ladies Of Guanabaco, produced at The Ensemble Studio Theater, NY, 1983. Repertorio Espanol, NY, 1987. The Mark Taper Forum Los Angeles, CA, 1994.
- Broken Eggs, produced at The Ensemble Studio Theater, NY, 1984, Repertorio Espanol, NY, 1988, 1998. Stage #1 Dallas, TX, 1986. Wisdom Bridge Theater Chicago, IL, 1990. The Mark Taper Forum, Los Angeles, CA, 1994. Toured throughout Cuba, 1997.
- Fabiola, produced at Theater For A New City, NY, 1986. Ensemble Studio Theater Los Angeles, CA, 1986. Yale Cabaret, CN, 1989. The Mark Taper Forum, Los Angeles, CA, 1994.
- When It’s Over, Produced at The Long Wharf Theater, CN, 1987.
- Why To Refuse, Produced at Theater For A New City, NY, 1987.
- Once Removed, The New Mexico Rep., NM, 1987. The Magic Theater, San Francisco, CA, 1990. The Playwrights Collective, NY, 1997. The Long Wharf Theater, CN, 1993. The Coconut Grove Playhouse, 2003.
- A Burning Beach, The American Place Theater, NY, 1988. Los Angeles Theater Center, CA, 1989.
- Don Juan In N.Y.C., Theater For A New City, NY, 1988.
- Wish You Were Here, Duo Theater, NY, 1987.
- The Day You’ll Love Me (translation, adaptation). The Mark Taper Forum, Los Angeles, CA, 1989. The Hampstead Theater Club, London, 1991.
- Stevie Wants To Play the Blues, Los Angeles Theater Center, CA, 1990. Williamstown Theater Festival, Massachusetts, 1997.
- Related Retreats, Theater For A New City, NY, 1990.
- In The Eye Of The Hurricane, The Actors Theater of Louisville, KY, 1991. The Mark Taper Forum, Los Angeles, CA, 1994.
- Across A Crowded Room, Manhattan Theater Club (Workshop), NY, 1996.
- Breathing It In, Downtown Art Co. NY, 1995.
- Closet Games, Magic Theater, San Francisco, 1995.
- Three Ways To Go Blind, Playwrights Collective, NY, 1995.
- Between The Sheets, Playwrights Collective, NY, 1997.
- Kissing Fidel, INTAR, New York City, 2005. The Public Theater (workshop), NY, 1997.
- Cuba And The Night, Theater For A New City, NY, 1998.
- The Day You Left Me, Windancer Productions, (workshop 1998).
- Crocodile Eyes, Theater For A New City, NY, 1998. Teatro Iberico, Portugal. Columbia University, 2004.
- Havana Is Waiting (formerly When The Sea Drowns In Sand). Actors Theater Of Louisville, KY, 2000. The Cherry Lane Theater, NY, 2001. The Cincinnati Playhouse In The Park 2002.
- The Cook, INTAR New York, January 2003. Hartford Stage, February 2005. The Goodman Theatre, 2007. Seattle Rep, 2007.
- Havana Journal, 2004. Theatre for a New City, 2010.
- That Tuesday. Actors Studio, 2003.
- The Flag, 2001.
- Rich Women, 2004. Produced 2015, Buenos Aires, Argentina
- Sacred Rhythms, 2005.
- Poet Matador, 2004.
- Celia’s Funeral (written with Carmelita Tropicana), 2004.
- The Conductor, 2004.
- Secret Tapes, 2004.
- In Old Havana, 2004.
- My Sister, Mark Taper Forum, 2004.
- Paula, 2006. Theatre For A New City
- Havana Journal, 2010 Theatre for A New City
- Crossing the Border, one act, 2006. produced New York City 59E59
- She Could Not Weep, 2007.
- That Night In Hialeah, 2008.
- Embroidering, 1979.
- Fiancés, 1989.
- See Emma Run, 1982.
- Because of the Stars, 1983 (lost).
- The Last Time I loved Lucy, 1991 (lost).
- The Spanish Lesson, 1987. Lincoln Center (Directors Lab).
- When It’s Cocktail Time In Cuba, 1991.
- The Perfect Light, 1985.
- Cabaret Bambu, 1989. Workshop. West Beth, INTAR theatre.
- Resident Alien, commissioned by Repertorio Espanol.
- Finding Your Way, 1985.
- How I Found My Way Back To Rosario, 1993.
- In Paradise, 2008.
- Mariquitas, Theatre For A New City, 2013
- Worship, Theatre For A New City, 2014
- Salve Regina, 2011
- Celia and Fidel, Arena Stage Theater, Washington D.C. March 13, 2020

=== Films ===
- Exiles in New York, wrote and directed. Played at The AFI film Festival, South by South west, The Latin America International Film Festival (in Havana, Cuba), The Santa Barbara Film Festival.
- Crossing the Border, for Edward James Olmos and Oliver Stone.
- The Ship (for Colombian independent film company), produced 1990.
- Worked with Al Pacino on Scarface, 1981.
- Worked with Mira Nair on The Perez Family, 1992.

=== Television ===
- Jubans, pilot, CBS, 1985.
- Home Free, movie, CBS, 1987.
- Her Name Was Lupe, HBO, 1988.
- China Rios, HBO, 1989.
- Hung, HBO, story editor, 2010.
- Magic City, Executive story editor. Starz, 1989.
- Havana Quartet, Executive Producer, E1, Starz, 1989.
- Tropicana, pilot, Amazon.

=== Books ===
- Tastes Like Cuba: An Exile's Hunger For Home, co-written with Michael Domitrovich. New York: Gotham Press, 2007. ISBN 1-59240-321-2.

== Teaching ==
- New York University, 2007-
- Columbia University, Head of Playwriting 1995–2007
- Columbia University, Adjunct Playwriting professor, 1991–95
- New York University, Adjunct Playwriting professor,1991–94. Professor, 2007-
- Sarah Lawrence College, Adjunct Playwriting professor, 1991–93.

=== Courses taught ===
- Playwriting, The New York Public Theater, NY, 1996–98
- Playwriting, Minneapolis Playwriting Center, 1996
- Playwriting, Mark Taper Forum, Los Angeles, 1993–95
- Playwriting, Dream Yard Drama Project For Teenagers, Harlem, NY, 1996–99.

== Grants and awards ==
- Two-time nominee for Best American Play by the Association of American Theater Critics, 2001, 1994.
- Berrilla Kerr Grant, 2001, for contribution to American Theater.
- National Endowment For the Arts and Theater Communications Group Playwright's In Residence Fellowship at Theater For a New City, 1999.
- National Theatre Conference Playwriting Award. 1995.
- Drama Logue Award, Best Play, 1991, 1994
- L.A. Weekly Theater Award, 1990, 1993, 1994
- Theater Communications Group and Pew Charitable Trusts National Theater Artists Residency
- Playwrights In Residence, Mark Taper Forum, Los Angeles, CA, 1993
- Viva Los Artists Award from the city of Los Angeles, 1993
- Ford Foundation Grant, 1993
- Rockefeller Foundation Playwriting Award, 1985
- National Endowment For the Arts Playwriting Grant, 1981, 1983, 1986.
- National Endowment For The Humanities Youth Grant, 1978

== Boards and artistic associations ==
- Artistic Director, INTAR New York, 2004–2010.
- Co-artistic Director, Cherry Lane Theater, NY. 1999–2002
- Artistic Associate, The New York Public Theater, NY. 1996–98
- Artistic Associate, The Mark Taper Forum, CA. 1992–95
- Artistic Associate, The Flea Theater, NY. 1997–2000

== Directing ==
=== Theater ===
Machado has directed numerous plays, including his own works and those of emerging writers. His work as a director has appeared in numerous regional theaters, including INTAR, Theater For a New City, The Daryl Roth 2, The Ensemble Studio, The Mark Taper Forum, The Playwrights Collective, The Company Theater, The Cherry Lane Alternative, The Flea Theater, The Group Theater and the Inner City Cultural Center.

=== Film ===
Exiles In New York. Writer and director. The Santa Barbara Film Festival. The AFI film Festival. The Havana Film Festival. South by South West, The Saratoga Film Festival.

== Acting ==
=== Theater ===
Machado has appeared across the country in plays by John Steppling, Maria Irene Fornes, Elmer Rice, Bertolt Brecht, Federico García Lorca, Rogelio Martinez and Nina Beeber, among others. Machado has also appeared at INTAR, Theater For A New City, The Company Theater, the Padua Hills Playwrights Festival, The Magic Theater, The Bilingual Foundation For the Arts, the Playwrights Collective and The Workhouse Theater.

=== Television ===
He has also appeared in television programs including Maude, The Nancy Walker Show, All In The Family, The Dancing Bear (Visions K.C.E.T.), Mary Hartman and What's Happening.

=== Film ===
The Champ, and Pollock directed by Ed Harris.

== Memberships ==
- Theater For a New City, Board Member 1995–present
- Dramatists Guild, Council Member 1990–2005
- New Dramatists 1983–1990, board member, 1990–98
- Theater Communications Group, board member,1994–97

== See also ==
- Cuban American literature
- List of Cuban American writers
- List of Famous Cuban-Americans.

== Sources ==
- The Columbia encyclopedia of modern drama, Volume 2
