= Melinda Lopez =

American dramatist

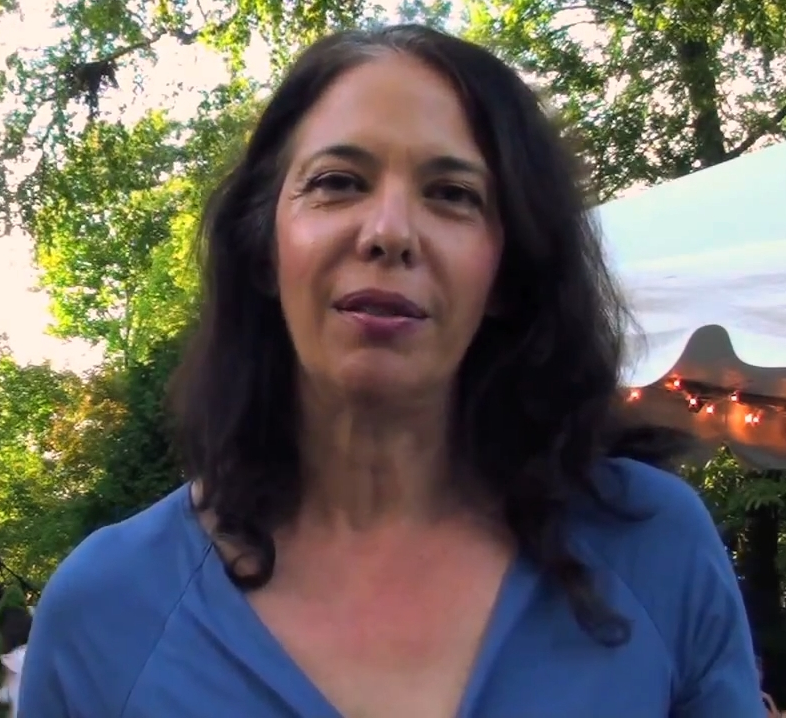
Melinda Lopez in 2014

Melinda Lopez is an actress, playwright, and educator from Boston, Massachusetts. She is the first ever playwright-in-residence for the Huntington Theatre Company. She is a professor at Northeastern University.

== Career ==
As a playwright, Lopez has produced a sizable body of work that spans the last two decades and has garnered a variety of awards. Lopez's plays include Alexandros (Laguna Playhouse), Caroline in Jersey (Williamstown Theatre Festival), and Sonia Flew, which premiered at the Huntington Theatre in Boston, MA in 2004 and won several Best New Play awards. The Huntington's production of Sonia Flew was the inaugural production at the Huntington's space for new work, the Calderwood Pavilion at the Boston Center for the Arts. Sonia Flew has since been produced for radio broadcast and in multiple other cities. Lopez has also authored God Smells Like a Roast Pig (Women on Top Festival), The Order of Things (CentaStage), How do you Spell Hope? (Underground Railway Theatre), and a translation of Federico García Lorca's Blood Wedding for Suffolk University. In 2009, she was commissioned by the National Institute of Health to author a work celebrating the bicentennial of Charles Darwin's birth, leading to her play From Orchids to Octopi, An Evolutionary Love Story. In 2013, Lopez was made the first ever playwright in residence at the Huntington Theatre thanks to a three-year grant from the Andrew W. Mellon Foundation. Lopez has held residencies with Harvard University, the New York Theatre Workshop, Sundance, and The Lark. Lopez has also acted in regional theaters across the country, most recently with Huntington Theatre Company and Speakeasy Stage Company of Boston.

Lopez's works frequently focus on the stories of Cuban or Cuban-American characters. Her play Becoming Cuba is set in 1897 Havana on the eve of the Spanish–American War, Alexandros centers on a Cuban family in exile, Sonia Flew is about a woman who was sent to the United States from Cuba as a child in 1961, and her one-woman show Midnight Sandwich/Medianoche (previously titled God Smells Like a Roast Pig) deals explicitly with Lopez's own struggle with her Cuban heritage.

In November 2016, ArtsEmerson produced Lopez's work, Mala. Mala is Lopez's one woman show about "an utterly unsentimental journey towards the end of life, Mala is an irreverent exploration of how we live, cope and survive in the moment." The production was directed by David Dower, and was remounted at the Calderwood Pavilion in January 2018 by the Huntington Theatre Company. The Huntington presentation was recorded and broadcast by GBH Channel 2 in 2020.

== Personal life ==
Lopez lives with her husband and daughter in Boston,. She has been a member of Actor's Equity Association since 1990. She holds a Bachelor of Arts from Dartmouth College and a Master of Arts from Boston University. She is Cuban American, and works with Boston-area charities that give humanitarian aid to Cuba. She is also a long-distance runner and has completed two marathons.

== Selected works ==
- The Lesson, Boston Theatre Marathon, 1999
- Midnight Sandwich/Medianoche; Or, God Smells Like a Roast Pig, The Women on Top Theatre Festival, 1999
- What The Market Will Bear, Boston Theatre Marathon, 2000
- Scenes from a Bordello, Boston Playwrights' Theater, 2000
- The Order of Things, CentaStage, 2000
- How Do You Spell Hope?, Underground Railway Theatre, 2001
- The Two Fifteen Local, Boston Theatre Marathon, 2002
- Sonia Flew, Huntington Theatre Company, 2004
- Gary, Steppenwolf Theatre Company First Look New Play Festival, 2007
- Alexandros, Laguna Playhouse, 2008
- Caroline in Jersey, Williamstown Theatre Festival, 2009
- From Orchids to Octopi: An Evolutionary Love Story, Underground Railway Theatre, 2009
- Blood Wedding translation, Suffolk University, 2009
- Bad Santa, Boston Theatre Marathon, 2010
- Downward Facing Dog, Boston Theatre Marathon, 2011
- Becoming Cuba, Huntington Theatre Company, 2014
- Girl Meets Boy: A Comedy About the Universe, Boston Museum of Science, Ongoing
- Back the Night, Boston Playwrights' Theatre, 2016
- Mala, ArtsEmerson, 2016
- Mr. Parent, Lyric Stage Company of Boston, 2022

== Acting ==
Show	Role	Company	Year
Many Colors Make the Thunder-king		Guthrie Theater	1997
A Month in the Country	Lizaveta Bogdanovna	Huntington Theatre Company	2002
The Rose Tattoo	Assunta	Huntington Theatre Company	2004
Anna in the Tropics	Conchita	Speakeasy Stage Company	2005
Persephone	Persephone	Huntington Theatre Company	2007
Oil Thief	Amy	Boston Playwrights' Theatre	2008
The Motherf**ker with the Hat	Victoria	Speakeasy Stage Company	2012
Our Town	Mrs. Gibbs	Huntington Theatre Company	2013
Appropriate	Toni	Speakeasy Stage Company	2015
Mala		ArtsEmerson	2016
Grand Concourse	Shelley	Speakeasy Stage Company	2017

== Awards ==
Year	Award	Category	Work	Result
1999	Charlotte Woolard Award	recognizing "a promising new voice in American theatre."	The Order of Things	Won
1999	Elliot Norton Award	Outstanding Solo Performance	God Smells Like a Roast Pig	Won
2003	Massachusetts Cultural Council	Grant for Playwriting		Won
2004	Independent Reviewers of New England	Best New Play	Sonia Flew	Won
2004	Independent Reviewers of New England	Best Production	Sonia Flew	Won
2004	Elliot Norton Award	Best New Play	Sonia Flew	Won
2004	Elliot Norton Award	Best Production	Sonia Flew	Won
2008	Elliot Norton Award	Best New Play	Gary	Nominated
2011	Independent Reviewers of New England	Best New Play	From Orchids to Octopi	Won

== See also ==
- Cuban American literature
- List of Cuban-American writers
