= Cuban American literature =

Cuban American literature overlaps with both Cuban literature and American literature, and is also distinct in itself. Its boundaries can blur on close inspection. Some scholars, such as Rodolfo J. Cortina, regard "Cuban American authors" simply as Cubans "who live and write in the United States." Canonical writers include Reinaldo Arenas, Rafael Campo, Nilo Cruz, Daína Chaviano, Carlos Eire, Roberto G. Fernández, Gustavo Pérez Firmat, Cristina García, Carolina Garcia-Aguilera, Oscar Hijuelos, Melinda Lopez, Eduardo Machado, Orlando Ricardo Menes, José Martí, Achy Obejas, Ricardo Pau-Llosa, and Virgil Suárez.

== History ==
The literature of Cuban Americans may be read in light of Cuban immigration to the United States and/or Cuban exile. Cortina incorporates this history into his grouping of Cuban American literary output into "generations": neoclassical (circa 1800–1825), romantic (1825–1850), realist–naturalist (1850–1880), impressionist (1880–1910), avant-garde (1910–1940), existentialist (1940–1960), revolutionary (1960–1985), and postmodern (1985–).

Cuban-American literature may be found in Spanish-language United States newspapers such as:

- El Eco de Cuba (est. 1855 in New York)
- El Horizonte (est. 1850 in New York by Miguel Teurbe Tolón)
- El Mulato (est. 1854 in New York)
- La Verdad (1848-1860, New York)

== See also ==
- List of Cuban-American writers
- Cuban immigration to the United States

== Bibliography ==
=== in English ===
- A. R. Hernández and Lourdes Casal. "Cubans in the United States: A Survey of the Literature" Estudios Cubanos Vol. 5 (1975).
- Carolina Hospital, ed. (1988). Cuban–American Writers: Los Atrevidos. Princeton: Linden Lane Press. (Anthology)
- Eliana S. Rivero (1989). "From Immigrants to Ethnics: Cuban Women Writers in the U.S.". In Asunción Horno–Delgado; et al. (eds.). Breaking Boundaries: Latina Writings and Critical Readings. Amherst: U of Massachusetts Press.
- Rodolfo J. Cortina, ed. (1991). Cuban-American Theater. Houston: Arte Publico Press.
- Rodolfo J. Cortina (1993). "History and Development of Cuban American Literature: a Survey". In Francisco Lomeli (ed.). Handbook of Hispanic Cultures in the United States: Literature and Art. Houston: Arte Publico Press. pp. 40–61. ISBN 978-1-61192-163-2.
- Lillian D. Bertot. The Literary Imagination of the Mariel Generation. Miami: Cuban American National Foundation, 1995.
- Maria Cristina Garcia (1996). "Cuban Writers and Scholars in Exile". Havana USA: Cuban Exiles and Cuban Americans in South Florida, 1959-1994. University of California Press. pp. 169+. ISBN 978-0-520-91999-0.
- Carolina Hospital; Jorge Cantera, eds. (1996). A Century of Cuban Writers in Florida: Selected Prose and Poetry. Sarasota: Pineapple Press. ISBN 978-1-56164-104-8. (Anthology; includes writer biographies)
- Isabel Álvarez Borland (1998). Cuban–American Literature of Exile: From Person to Persona. University of Virginia Press.
- Rodrigo Lazo. "Los Filibusteros: Cuban Writers in the United States and Deterritorialized Print Culture" American Literary History 15 (January 2003): 87-106.
- M. Delores Carlito (2005). Cuban-American Fiction in English: An Annotated Bibliography of Primary and Secondary Sources. Scarecrow Press. ISBN 978-0-8108-5680-6.
- Rodrigo Lazo (2005). Writing to Cuba: Filibustering and Cuban exiles in the United States. Envisioning Cuba. Univ. of North Carolina Press. ISBN 0807829307.
- Rodolfo J. Cortina (2008), "Cuban Literature in the United States", in Nicolás Kanellos (ed.), Greenwood Encyclopedia of Latino Literature, ABC-CLIO
- Isabel Álvarez Borland; Lynette M. F. Bosch, eds. (2009). "Literature". Cuban–American Literature and Art: Negotiating Identities. State University of New York Press. pp. 15–128. ISBN 0791493741. (Essays by Jorge Febles, Gustavo Pérez Firmat, Iraida H. López, William Luis, Elena Rivero, Adriana Méndez Rodenas)
- Ricardo L. Ortiz (2013). "Canons: Cuban-American Literature". In Suzanne Bost; Frances R. Aparicio (eds.). Routledge Companion to Latino/a Literature. Routledge. pp. 413–422. ISBN 978-1-136-22160-6.
- Armando Simon (2014) The Cult of Suicide and Other Scifi Stories. Raleigh: Lulu Press.

=== in Spanish ===
- Linden Lane Magazine (in Spanish), ISSN 0736-1084 1982- (Founded by Belkis Cuza Malé and Heberto Padilla)
- Mariel (in Spanish and English), Miami, FL, ISSN 0892-7820 1986-
- González, Yara, “La poesía cubana en los Estados Unidos” in Culturas hispánicas en los Estados Unidos, eds. María Jesus Buxó Rey; Tomás Calvo Buezas (Cultura Hispánica Madrid, 1990)
- Armando Simon, "Infidel!" Raleigh, Lulu Press, 2008.
