= Ernesto Padilla =

Cuban-American artist, graphic designer and cigar maker

- Born: 1972 (age 53–54); Havana, Cuba
- Occupations: Artist, Graphic Designer, Cigar Maker
- Parent(s): Heberto Padilla and Belkis Cuza Malé

Ernesto Padilla (born 1972 in Havana, Cuba) is a Cuban-American artist, graphic designer and cigar maker. He is the son of Cuban poet Heberto Padilla.

== Early life ==
Padilla was born to Heberto Padilla, a Cuban writer and poet, and his wife, the artist and poet Belkis Cuza Malé. Heberto Padilla was out of favor with the government of Fidel Castro at the time of Ernesto's birth, and the family was living under house arrest in an apartment in the Marianao neighborhood of Havana.

In 1979, Padilla and his mother were allowed to leave Cuba for the United States. His father, Heberto, was not allowed to leave Cuba until 1980. They initially settled in Miami, Florida, but later moved to Princeton, New Jersey.

== Early career ==
After graduating from high school in Princeton, New Jersey, Ernesto embarked upon a career in the graphic arts, and studied at several schools, including the Art Institute of Philadelphia, the Art Institute of Fort Lauderdale and the Miami School of Design. He has participated in numerous art exhibitions throughout the USA and currently has works at The Gallery of Cuban Art at La Casa Azul in Fort Worth, Texas.

After completing his schooling, Ernesto began working in advertising, working on various major accounts. He moved to Miami to take a job with Tabacalera Perdomo, where he was involved in marketing and product development.

== Transition to cigar maker ==
He himself had not been involved in the cigar and tobacco industry prior to his work at Perdomo, but he comes from a family that had been deeply involved in tobacco in Cuba. His great-grandparents had owned a tobacco plantation in the Pinar del Río region of Cuba, and his father had grown up on it. Ernesto attributes his love of cigars and the tobacco business to his father: "He always had a passion for cigars. He was like a secondary ambassador for cigars…I always loved it, always loved the business because of that." Coming from a tobacco family, Ernesto knew or was acquainted with many people in the tobacco growing world. Working for Perdomo served to solidify these connections, and in time, he struck out on his own.

On 24 April 2003, Ernesto and his brother Carlos incorporated as Padilla Cigar Company, and embarked on a new career as cigar makers.

== Padilla Cigars ==
Within the Padilla Cigar Company Ernesto handles product development and marketing, while Carlos handles administration and management. Much of the graphic arts in the brand advertising, including band designs, is done by Coolbirth, Inc.

Padilla Cigar Co. is what is referred to as a "boutique" brand, i. e., a small company of limited production and distribution. This allows such a company to concentrate on achieving a high quality product. In the case of Padilla Cigars, they have chosen to concentrate on using very rare and limited Cuban-seed first generation tobaccos in almost all their blends, production numbers are therefore also naturally limited.

In developing the blends used in Padilla cigars, Ernesto worked closely with experts, including José "Don Pepin" García and Gilberto Oliva.

In 2008, Padilla parted company with García due to the latter's expanding commitments to other cigar makers. Padilla opened up his own 2,000-square-foot (190 m^{2}) manufacturing facility in the Little Havana section of Miami, Florida, to which production of Padilla's "Miami", "Signature 1932", and "1948" cigars was shifted. Production of other Padilla-branded products continued under the auspices of other cigar makers, with the "Serie 1968" made in Honduras by Tabacalera Aguilar and the "Padilla Habano" made in Nicaragua by A.J. Fernandez.

The company currently has several brands in regular production and makes special, limited release cigars from time to time as well as occasional custom brands.

=== 2012 revamping ===
In May 2012 Ernesto Padilla announced a major change in the Padilla lineup. Four of Padilla's flagship products were to be discontinued, including the Signature 1932, Miami, Dominus, and the newly introduced Artemis, with these to be replaced by new Miami-made lines called Invictitus and Miami Maduro, as well as a Nicaraguan-made lines to be known as Padilla Reserve and Premier Cru. The small El Titán de Bronze factory owned by Sandra Cobras was named as the maker of Padilla's Miami-based production, while a move was made from the Tabacalera Tropical factory to the TABOLISA facility in Estelí for manufacture of the company's new Nicaraguan line. The TABOLISA factory is the same used by Oliva Cigar Company for the manufacture of its products.

Late in 2011 another new line called Padilla Legacies was introduced, made in the Tabacalera Tropical factory for exclusive distribution by mailorder giant E.P. Thompson & Co. This new line was to be unaffected by Padilla's 2012 move from Tabacalera Tropical to TABOLISA.

=== Regular production lines (as of 2015) ===
- Padilla Maduro
- Padilla Hybrid
- Padilla Miami
- Padilla Signature 1932
- Padilla Obsidian
- Padilla Crianza
- Padilla Dominus
- Padilla Artemis (released May 2011)
- Padilla La Terraza (released May 2011)
- Padilla Legacies
- Padilla 8 & 11
- Padilla La Reserva
- Padilla Vintage Reserve (released 2013)
Gallery of cigar band designs by Ernesto Padilla

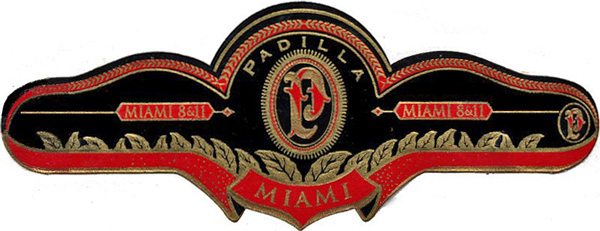
Padilla Miami
old design

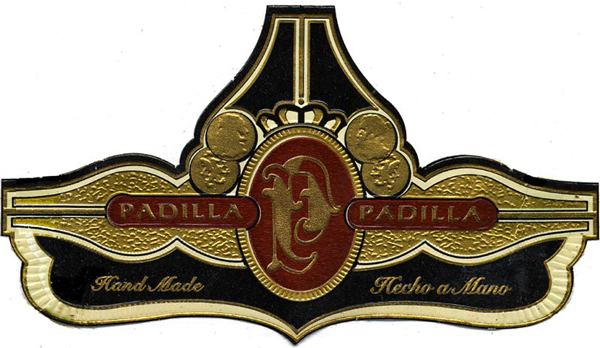
Padilla Hybrid
old design

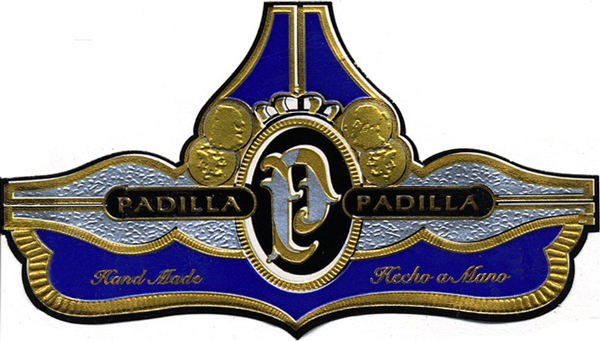
Padilla Maduro
old design

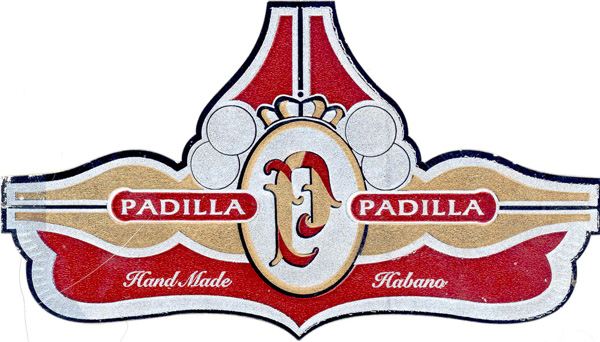
Padilla Habano
old design

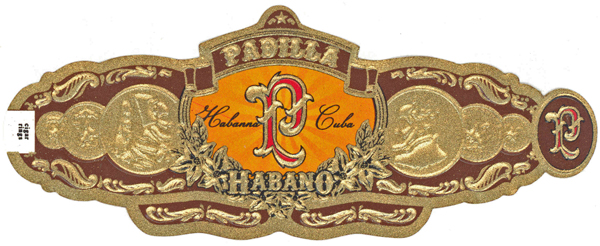
Padilla Habano
old design

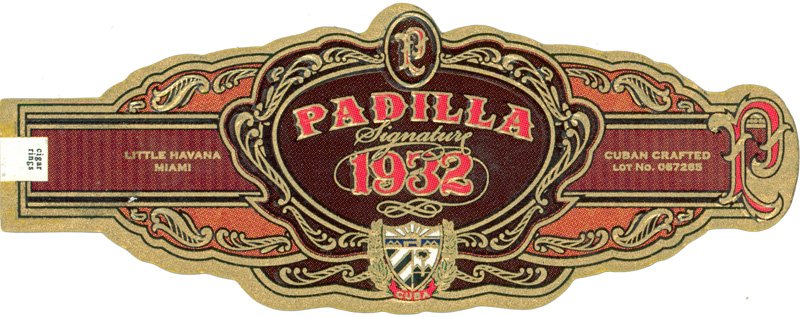
Signature 1932
old design

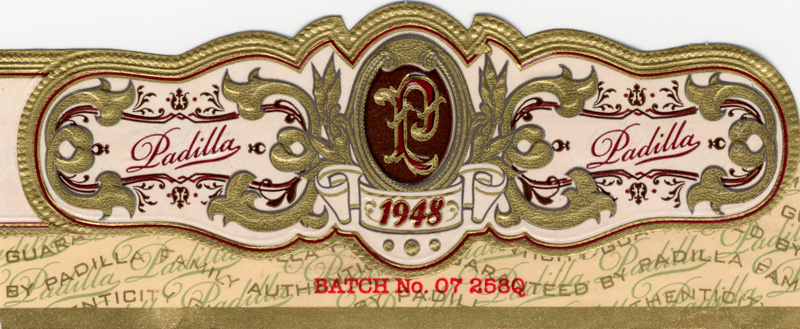
Padilla 1948
old design

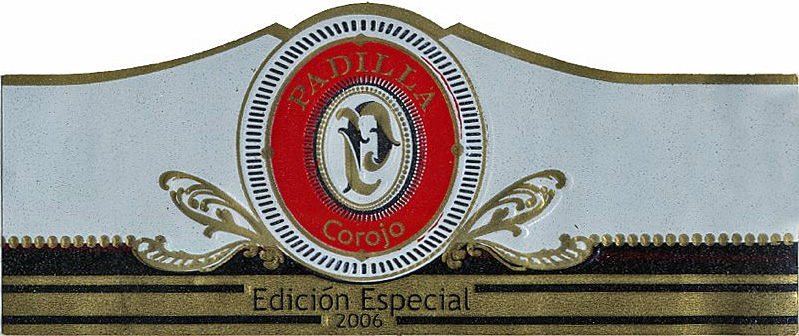
Padilla Edición Especial Achilles
old design

=== Special production cigars ===
Ernesto has produced several special cigars that took advantage of some special small-crop tobaccos by creating a series of very limited editions which he called Edición Especial. These are briefly listed below.

- Padilla Edición Especial en Cedro. This was a Toro Grande (6 x 52) and had a Connecticut wrapper surrounding tobaccos from Nicaragua, the Dominican Republic and Peru. Each cigar was given a cedar sleeve.
- Padilla Edición Especial Obsidian. With a very deep black Nicaraguan ligero maduro wrapper, the Obsidian (a Toro, 6 x 54) was filled with Honduran Corojo from Jalapá mixed with dark, Nicaraguan tobaccos grown in Estelí, Nicaragua. Initial release was limited to 50,000 cigars, but it was later (late 2007) re-introduced as an exclusive to a single retailer, this time as a 6 x 54 Belicoso. This new version is made at Pepin Garcia's Nicaraguan factory, TACUBA.
- Padilla Edición Especial Achilles. This cigar was manufactured in Pepin Garcia's factory at Estelí, Nicaragua, Tabacalera Cubana. Production was limited to 60,000 of only one size, a Toro (6" x 50). A full-bodied cigar, the wrapper is a Corojo. Despite the low production numbers, it was reasonably priced.
- Padilla/Studio Tabac Special Edition Figuaro. Special production 2011 collaboration project between Padilla and Oliva Cigar Company, with a very limited one year production of 1,000 boxes of 10 cigars in a figurado vitola.

=== Planned lines ===
- Padilla Legacies

== See also ==
- List of cigar brands
