= Orlando Ricardo Menes =

American poet (born 1958)

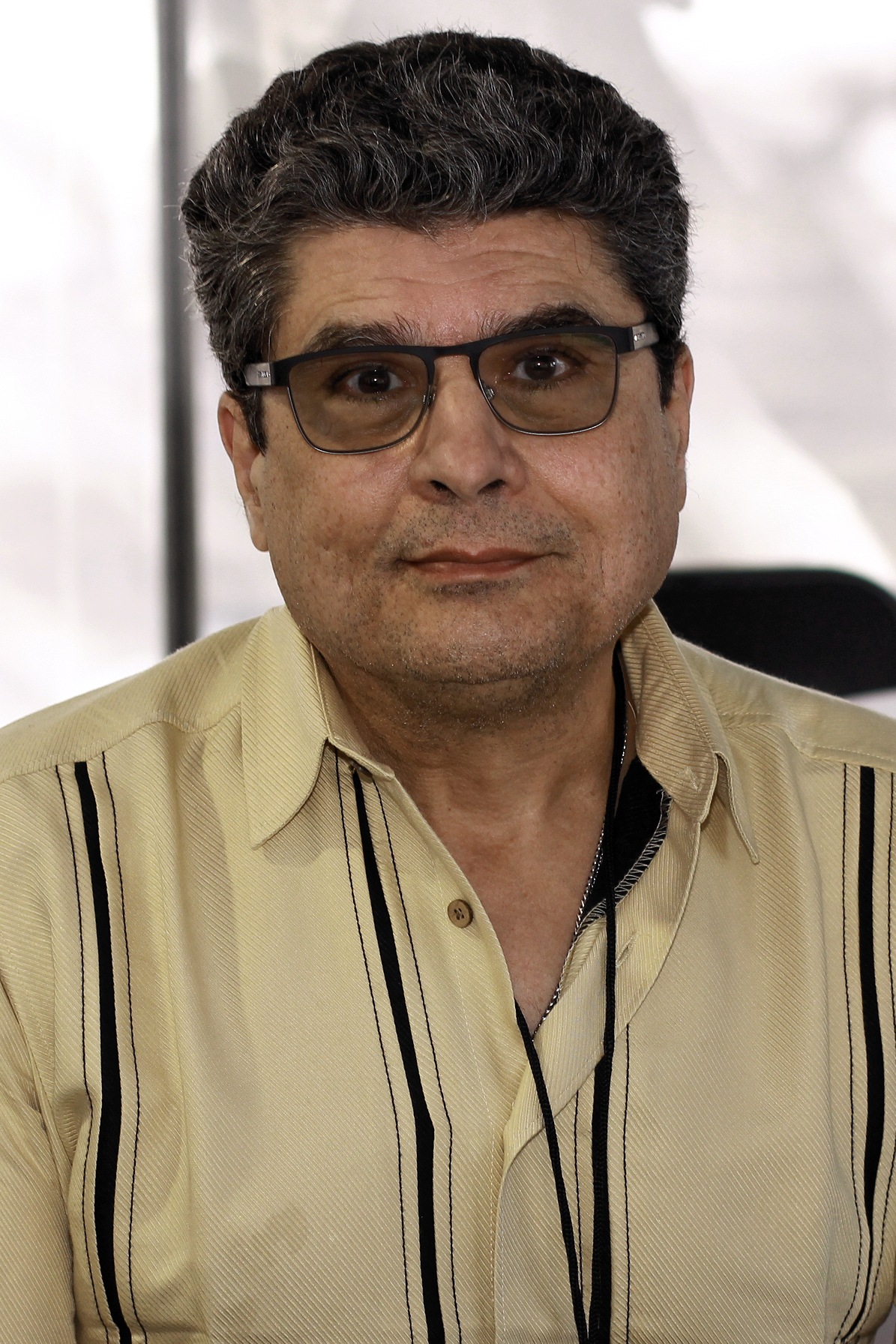
Menes at the 2019 Texas Book Festival

Orlando Ricardo Menes (born 1958) is a Cuban-American poet, short story writer, translator, editor, and professor.

Born in Lima, Peru, to Cuban parents, Menes immigrated to the United States at the age of 10 after a leftist coup d'etat forced his family out of Peru. He has lived almost his entire life in the US, except for two years spent in Madrid, Spain, right before the death of Francisco Franco.

== Career ==
Menes earned a BA and a MA from the University of Florida and a PhD in English from the University of Illinois at Chicago. He currently teaches in the Creative Writing Program at the University of Notre Dame.

The author of seven poetry collections, apart from anthologies and numerous translations of Latin American poetry, Menes's work has appeared in Poetry, American Poetry Review, Georgia Review, Prairie Schooner, Hudson Review, Yale Review, Harvard Review, Callaloo, Hotel Amerika, Boulevard, Shenandoah, The Southern Review, Sycamore Review, Indiana Review, River Styx, Epoch, Colorado Review, New Letters, Crab Orchard Review, and Green Mountains Review.

== Awards ==
- 2009 Literature Fellowship from the National Endowment for the Arts
- 2012 Prairie Schooner Book Prize (Poetry), Fetish
- 2019 Glenna Luschei Prairie Schooner Award in Fiction

== Works ==
=== Books ===
- The Gospel of Wildflowers & Weeds (University of New Mexico Press, 2022)
- Memoria (Louisiana State University Press, 2019)
- Heresies (University of New Mexico Press, 2015)
- Fetish (University of Nebraska, 2013)
- Furia (Milkweed Editions, 2005)
- Rumba atop the Stones (Peepal Tree Press, 2001)
- Borderlands with Angels (chapbook) [Bacchae Press, 1994]. Winner of the 1994 Bacchae Press Chapbook Contest.

=== Anthologies ===
- The Open Light: Poets from Notre Dame, 1991–2008 (University of Notre Dame Press, 2011)
- Renaming Ecstasy: Latino Writings on the Sacred (Bilingual Press/Editorial Bilingüe, 2004)

=== Translations ===
- My Heart Flooded with Water: Selected Poems by Alfonsina Storni (Latin American Literary Review Press, 2009)
