= Jorge Reyes (writer) =

- Born: 1972 (age 52–53)

Jorge Reyes (March 9, 1971 – March 13, 2015) was a Cuban-born, American author known for authoring books in several genres. He is an honor graduate (1993) of Barry University, from which he received a B.A. in history, a B.S in political science, and a minor in literature. He died in Miami on March 13, 2015, after a short illness.

== Biography ==
=== Early life ===
Born in Santiago de Cuba, Reyes left Cuba with his parents via Costa Rica, before settling permanently in Miami in 1982.

=== Writing ===
Reyes has written books in several genres of literature: biography, fiction, non-fiction, children's books and poetry. Most of what is known about Reyes's childhood was penned down by Reyes himself in his book, Rediscovering Cuba: A Personal Memoir, published in 2001. In it, he talks about his childhood days in a small town called Boniato on the outskirts of Santiago de Cuba. The book itself, based on a family emergency, became also an analysis of Cuba's present condition as viewed by Reyes himself. Reyes's method of choosing to write his Cuban memoirs displayed some writing skills for which he has been noted, mainly:

1. The ability to utilize a wide array of genres in unexpected but highly effective visual ways;
2. The ability to write biographical themes, such as his Cuban memoirs, which many writers reserve for fictional accounts, such as: stream of consciousness, poetry, and even short-stories in order to explain non-fictional accounts of events.

In 2003, Reyes surprised his readership by publishing, among other things, a book of poems titled, My Words Mean Something. Poetry, however, is the genre Reyes returned to with the publication of "Day's Night," published in 2014.

== Bibliography ==
- Guia Para Descubrir Tu Cuerpo (Your Body) (2000) ISBN 0-939193-55-8
- Rediscovering Cuba: A Personal Memoir (2001) ISBN 0-595-19457-5
- My Words Mean Something (2003) ISBN 0-595-22311-7
- Day's Night (2014) ISBN 978-1481215992

Forthcoming books

- Caramelo's Dream (short stories)
- This and that (Essays)

== See also ==
- List of Cuban American writers
- List of Cuban Americans
