= Rafael Campo (poet) =

American author and doctor

- Born: November 24, 1964 (age 61); Dover, New Jersey, United States
- Education: Amherst College; Harvard Medical School
- Medical career
- Profession: Physician
- Field: Internal medicine
- Institutions: Beth Israel Deaconess Medical Center; Harvard Medical School
- Writing career
- Years active: 1994 – present
- Genre: Poetry

Rafael Campo (born 1964 New Jersey) is an American poet, doctor, and author.

== Early life and education ==
Rafael Campo was born on November 24, 1964, in Dover, New Jersey to a Cuban Italian family.

Campo graduated with a BA and MA from Amherst College. Campo continued his medical education at Harvard Medical School, graduating with a MD.

== Career ==
Campo began practising internal medicine in the early 1990s. Campo formally practiced medicine at Beth Israel Deaconess Medical Center in Boston, Massachusetts and was associate professor of medicine at Harvard Medical School. Campo is the poetry editor of the Journal of the American Medical Association. He served as a resident poet at Brandeis University and the University of Illinois at Urbana-Champaign. He frequently reads at colleges, including Brown University, Stanford University, and Colby-Sawyer College. He formerly taught in the Lesley University low-residency MFA writing program in Cambridge, Massachusetts.

=== Poetry ===
His writing focuses on themes that promote equality and justice for gay people, people of color, and working-class people. His work has served as the inspiration for composers and other artists. His poem "Silence=Death" was set by composer Joseph Hallman and premiered as part of the AIDS Quilt Songbook Project. His work was included in the "Best American Poetry and Pushcart Prize" anthologies and has been published on numerous occasions in periodicals such as The Los Angeles Times, The New York Times Magazine, and The Washington Post "Book World".

=== Philosophy ===
Rafael Campo believes that medicine should be about treating patients’ diseases and problems while focusing on their humanity. He claims that it would be wrong for a physician to only focus on “the heartless, purely fact-based narrative we record in their charts”. Instead, Campo hopes to inspire physicians through his work to reflect on the experiences of patients and address their needs appropriately, using poetry. Campo argues that poetry can often be crucial to the healing and recovery process.

== Awards ==
- First Prize 2013 Hippocrates Open International Prize for Poetry and Medicine
- National Poetry Series, the Lambda Literary Award
- 1997 Guggenheim Fellowship.

== Publications ==
- Campo, Rafael (1994). The Other Man Was Me: A Voyage to the New World. Houston: Arte Público Press. ISBN 978-1-55885-111-5.
- Campo, Rafeal (1996). What the Body Told. Durham, North Carolina: Duke University Press. ISBN 978-0-8223-1742-5.
- Campo, Rafeal (1997). The Poetry of Healing: A Doctor's Education in Empathy, Identity, and Desire. New York City: W. W. Norton & Co Inc. ISBN 9780393040098.
- Campo, Rafael (1999). Diva. Durham, North Carolina: Duke University Press. ISBN 978-0-8223-2417-1.
- Campo, Rafael (2002). Landscape with Human Figure. Durham, North Carolina: Duke University Press. ISBN 978-0-8223-2890-2.
- Campo, Rafael (2003). The Healing Art: A Doctor's Black Bag of Poetry. New York City: W. W. Norton & Co Inc. ISBN 978-0393057270.
- Campo, Rafael (2007). The Enemy. Durham, North Carolina: Duke University Press. ISBN 978-0-8223-8957-6.
- Campo, Rafael (2013). Alternative Medicine. Durham, North Carolina: Duke University Press. ISBN 978-0-8223-5587-8.
- Campo, Rafael (2018). Comfort Measures Only: New and Selected Poems, 1994–2016. Durham, North Carolina: Duke University Press. ISBN 978-1-4780-0021-1.

== See also ==
- Cuban American literature
- List of Cuban-American writers
- Latino literature
- American Literature in Spanish
