= Virgil Suárez =

American poet

- Born: Virgilio Suárez; January 29, 1962 (age 64); Havana, Cuba
- Occupations: Poet, novelist
- Writing career
- Notable works: Banyan, Going Under, Spared Angola
- Notable awards: Book Expo America/Latino Literature Hall of Fame Poetry Prize; G. MacCarthur Poetry Prize

Virgil Suárez (born January 29, 1962, Havana, Cuba) is a poet and novelist. He is a professor of English at Florida State University. He is one of the leading writers in the Cuban American community, known for his novels including Latin Jazz and Going Under. He has also reviewed books for The Los Angeles Times, The Miami Herald, The Philadelphia Inquirer, and The Tallahassee Democrat.

== Early life ==
He spent four years in Spain, 1970–1974. He moved to the U.S. in 1974. He went to high school in Los Angeles, California. He received a BA from California State University, Long Beach. He received an MFA from Louisiana State University (1987) while studying under Vance Bourjaily. He studied under Sir Angus Wilson and Robert Houston for a year at the University of Arizona.

== Literary work and reception ==
Suárez's first novel, Latin Jazz was described by Newsday as "a striking debut. A well crafted and sensitive novel. An engrossing, honest book by a writer who cares deeply about preserving ties within the family unit and, by extension, within the Hispanic community and America. Suarez is marvelous." His novel The Cutter was described by Publishers Weekly as a "powerful novel about one individual's response to the abuses and arbitrariness of totalitarianism [that] shows us how ordinary people can be driven to take extraordinary risks." His collection of stories, Welcome to the Oasis, was described by Kirkus Reviews as "A tightly controlled but affecting exploration of fundamental tensions" in the Cuban exile/Marielito community. New York Public Library named the collection as one of the top books for the Teen Age.

Other praise has come from The New York Times: "Mr. Suarez writes in a cold, unornamental, Hemingwayesque style, always straight forward and cinematic" and The Village Voice "Like Oscar Hijuelos, Suarez has taken pains with his craft, orchestrating points of view and narrative time. His forte is directness of description and action."

Suárez has stated that he no longer writes novels and finds writing poetry better for him. He also states that Spared Angola is the work in which he found his voice. He continues to explore the experience of exile, of living as a gypsy.

=== Personal life ===
Suárez is married with children.

== Published works ==
- The Painted Bunting's Last Molt, new poems, U. of Pittsburgh P, 2020.
- 90 Miles (Selected & New Poems), U of Pittsburgh P, 2005.
- Landscapes & Dreams (poems), Louisiana Literature P, 2003.
- Vespers: Spirituality in America (anthology), U of Iowa P, 2003.
- Guide to the Blue Tongue (poems), U of Illinois, 2002.
- Banyan (poems), Louisiana State U P, 2001.
- Palm Crows (poems), U of Arizona P, 2001.
- American Diaspora (anthology), U of Iowa P, 2001.
- The Cutter (reprint, novel), Ballatine/Available, 1991 and Arte Público Press, 1999.
- In the Republic of Longing (poems), Bilingual Review Press/Arizona State U, 2000.
- You Come Singing (poems), Tia Chucha/Northwestern UP, 1998.
- Garabato Poems (poems), Wings, 1998.
- Spared Angola (poems, essays, stories), Arte Publico Press, 1997.
- Going Under (novel), Arte Público Press, 1996.
- Havana Thursdays (novel), Arte Público Press, 1995.
- Iguana Dreams (anthology), HarperCollins, 1993.
- Welcome to the Oasis (stories) Arte Público Press, 1992.
- Latin Jazz (novel) William Morrow, 1989.

Shorter pieces have been published in: Ploughshares, Prairie Schooner, The Kenyon Review, Clackamas Literary Review, TriQuarterly, Colorado Review, The Southern Review, The Massachusetts Review, American Literary Review, The American Voice, The Caribbean Review, The North American Review, Manoa: A Pacific Journal of International Writing, Puerto del Sol, Northwest Review, Mid-American Review, Blue Mesa Review, Crazy Horse, Cimarron, Tampa Review, and in Argentina, Australia, Canada, Chile, Colombia, Cuba, England, France, India, Israel, Spain, Venezuela, and New Zealand.

== Awards ==
- Best American Poetry, 2004.
- G. MacCarthur Poetry Prize, 2002.
- The Daily News/The Caribbean Writer/University of the Virgin Islands Poetry Prize, 2002.
- National Endowment of the Arts Fellowship, 2001.
- The Book Expo America/Latino Literature Hall of Fame Poetry Prize for Best Book of Poetry (for Banyan), 2001.
- Winner of a Florida State Individual Artist Grant, 1998.
- Winner of New York Public Library's Best Book for the Teenager, 1993.
- Nominated for five Pushcart Prizes.

== See also ==
- List of Cuban American writers
- List of Famous Cuban-Americans.

== Critical studies in English ==
as of March 2008:

1. "Virgilio Suárez (1962-)." By: Roberto G. Fernández. IN: West-Durán, Herrera-Sobek and Salgado, Latino and Latina Writers, I: Introductory Essays, Chicano and Chicana Authors; II: Cuban and Cuban American Authors, Dominican and Other Authors, Puerto Rican Authors. New York: Scribner's; 2004. pp. 747–61
2. "Dos novelas cubanoamericanas: Dos inserciones del imaginario Cuba dentro de la realidad estadounidense." By: Humberto López Cruz, Torre de Papel, 2003 Summer-Fall; 13 (2–3): 15–23.
3. "Virgil Suárez and Finnegans Wake (FW)." By: Tatsuo Hamada, Abiko Annual with James Joyce Finnegans Wake Studies, 2001; 21: 179–82.
4. "Virgil Suárez's The Cutter and Going Under: Beat on the Drum or Beaten by the Humdrum?" By: William O. Deaver Jr. Anales Literarios: Narradores, 2001; 3 (3): 110–17.
5. "Going Under y Raining Backwards: Una lectura de enfrentamiento en el proceso de asimiliación dentro de la sociedad estadounidense." By: Humberto López Cruz, SECOLAS Annals: Journal of the Southeastern Council on Latin American Studies, 1999 Nov; 31: 85–91.
6. "Going Under and Spared Angola: Memories from a Cuban-American Childhood: A Contrapunteo on Cultural Identity." By: Leira Annette Manso, Bilingual Review/La Revista Bilingüe, 1999 Sept-Dec; 24 (3): 295–98.
7. "Humor e hipérbole en Raining Backwards y Going Under." By: Humberto López Cruz, Encuentro de la Cultura Cubana, 1999 Autumn; 14: 163–69.
8. "The Prodigal Son in the Structure of Raining Backwards, Crazy Love, and Latin Jazz." By: William O. Deaver Jr.; Americas Review: A Review of Hispanic Literature and Art of the USA, 1996 Fall-Winter; 24 (3–4): 179–90.

=== Interviews ===
1. "The Work We Leave Behind: An Interview with Virgil Suárez." By: William T. Vandegrift Jr.; Quarterly West, 2004 Summer; 58: 68–79.
2. "Electric Dialogue: An E-mail Conversation with Virgil Suárez." By: James Mayo, Bilingual Review/La Revista Bilingüe, 2001 Jan-2002 Apr; 26 (1): 56–63.
