= Enrique Labrador Ruiz =

Cuban journalist and novelist

- Born: May 11, 1902; Sagua la Grande, Cuba
- Died: November 10, 1991 (aged 89); Miami, Florida
- Occupations: Journalist, novelist, essayist, poet
- Spouse: María (Cheché)
- Awards: Hernández Catá Prize (1946); Premio Nacional de Literatura (1950)

Enrique Labrador Ruiz (May 11, 1902 – November 10, 1991) was a Cuban journalist, novelist, essayist, short story writer, and poet.

== Biography ==
Enrique Labrador Ruiz, Cuban journalist, novelist, essayist, short story writer, and poet, was born in Sagua la Grande, Cuba, on May 11, 1902. He was a member of the Academia Cubana de la Lengua and also of the Academia Norteamericana de la Lengua Española. Labrador Ruiz was a well-learned and traveled man who created his own style of writing novels, which he called gaseiforme. In 1933, he published his first novel in this style, El laberinto de sí mismo, which forms a trilogy with Cresival (1936) and Anteo (Novela gaseiforme) (1940). With his collection of short stories, El gallo en el espejo (1953), he established his cuentería cubiche style.

In 1976, Labrador Ruiz and his wife María (Cheché) were exiled from Cuba. After residing in Spain and Venezuela, they moved to and maintained their permanent residence in Miami, Florida. During his years of exile, Labrador Ruiz wrote for many literary journals and newspapers, including Réplica (Miami), El Diario de Caracas, and Linden Lane Magazine.

Enrique Labrador Ruiz received numerous awards and honors for his works of literature. In Cuba, Conejito Ulán won the Hernández Catá Prize in 1946, and in 1950 his novel Sangre hambrienta won the Premio Nacional de Literatura. Some of his most important works are: El gallo en el espejo (1953), El pan de los muertos (1958), and his final work, Cartas a la carte (1991).

Enrique Labrador Ruiz died in Miami on November 10, 1991.

== Works or publications ==
- Anteo (novela gaseiforme). Habana: [Carasa y cía]. 1940. OCLC 31296981.
- Ateneo : novela gasei forme. Habana: [publisher not identified]. 1940. OCLC 2907220.
- Carne de quimera : (novelines neblinosos). Miami, Fla.: SIBI. 1983. OCLC 10470989.
- Cartas a la carte. Miami, FL: Ediciones Universal. 1991. OCLC 23930395.
- Conejito Ulán. La Habana: Ediciones La Tertulia. 1963. OCLC 935654.
- Cresival : novela. Habana, Cuba: [publisher not identified]. 1936. OCLC 4731458.
- Cuentos. La Habana: [UNEAC]. 1970. OCLC 2405816.
- El cuento en la revolución. La Habana: Union de escritores y artistas de Cuba. 1975. OCLC 490797162.
- El gallo en el espejo. Mexico: Editorial Novaro. 1958. OCLC 3209206.
- El laberinto de sí mismo : novela. New York: Senda Nueva de Ediciones. 1983. OCLC 10344167.
- El pan de los muertos. Miami, Fla., U.S.A.: Ediciones Universal. 1988. OCLC 18718106.
- Enrique en la república de Labrador. Matanzas Cuba: Ediciones Matanzas. 2011. OCLC 818354240.
- Grimpolario (saldo lírico). Habana: Carasa y Co. 1937. OCLC 5269600.
- Festschrift. Montevideo: Ed. Ciencias. 1981. OCLC 252866637.
- La sangre hambrienta; novela. México: Ediciones Mundo Nuevo. 1959. OCLC 3521712.
- Conversaciones con Reinaldo Sánchez. Miami, FL: Hispamerican Books. 1984. OCLC 12930814.
- Manera de vivir : pequeño expediente literario. La Habana: [publisher not identified]. 1941. OCLC 4599447.
- Papel de fumar, cenizas de conversación. La Habana: Editorial Lex. 1945. OCLC 13548698.
- Trailer de sueños. Habana. 1949. OCLC 5924741.
- Un hombre de vasos capilares. Santa Clara: Editorial Capiro. 2005. OCLC 181159676.
- Viajero sin itinerarios: crónicas de viaje. La Habana, Cuba: Editorial Letras Cubanas. 2011. OCLC 801973483.
- Grimpolario (saldo lírico). 1937.
- Carne de quimera (novelines neblinosos). 1947.

== See also ==
- Cuban American literature
- List of Cuban-American writers
