= Juana Rosa Pita =

American poet, writer, editor, and translator

- Born: 8 December 1939 (age 86); Havana
- Education: Catholic University of America; George Mason University
- Occupations: Writer; Editor; Author

Juana Rosa Pita (n. Padrón) is a poet, writer, editor and translator. She was born in Havana on December 8, 1939. She left Cuba in 1961. Since then, she has lived in many cities, including Washington, Caracas, Madrid, New Orleans, Miami, and Boston, where she currently resides. From 1989 to 1992 she was Visiting Professor at Tulane University. She is considered one of the most important contemporary Cuban and Latin American poets. The late Nicaraguan poet Pablo Antonio Cuadra hailed her as "one of the outstanding voices of Cuba’s pilgrim culture. Book after book Juana Rosa Pita has been creating a mysterious realm of love and prophecy: an island of enchantment where words restore all that hatred turned to ashes."

== Example ==
Her ars poetica can be illustrated in a grain of poetry, using her words, a sip of light:

Puede uno contentarse	One can be content
con poco en la vida	with little in life
siempre que el poco sea inmenso.	if that little is immense.

== Poetry and prizes ==
In 1975 Pita won first prize for Latin American poetry from the Institute of Hispanic culture in Malaga, Spain. Since then she has published over two dozen titles, first under the seal of Ediciones Solar, "itinerant editorial" (in the words of Octavio Paz) which she co-founded with David Lagmanovich and sustained for ten years with over 26 books of poetry published by twelve different authors. In 1981 she gave a lecture and reading tour to several universities in Germany and traveled to Caracas as a special guest of the II Congress of Writers in Spanish Language. Her poetry has been widely studied, partly translated to seven languages; mostly to English and Italian; and included in international anthologies such as Poetisch Rebellieren (Kassel: Werkstatt Verlag, 1981); New Directions in Prose and Poetry 49 (New York: New Directions Books, 1985), translated by Donald D.Walsh; A Century of Cuban Writers in Florida. (Pineapple Press: Sarasota, 1996), Doscientos años de poesía cubana/ 1770-1990/ Cien poemas antológicos (La Habana, 1999), La pérdida y el sueño (Ed. Término, 2001); Poesía cubana del siglo XX (México: FCE, 2002); Breve polifonía hispanoamericana (Chile, 2005); Otra Cuba secreta (Madrid: Verbum, 2012); Catedral sumergida (La Habana: Letras Cubanas, 2013), among others.

Juana Rosa Pita travels frequently to Italy, and also writes and publishes poetry in Italian. In 1985 she was awarded the VIII Premio Pisa Internazionale Ultimo Novecento in the section 'Poeti nel mondo "("it is so significant for Italian literature at the beginning of the century the life force of her poetry composed with an exemplary harmony, brilliant, concise and new, because it pursues no balancing of fashion, but springs from an expressive sensitivity orchestrated with an original rhythm "). Two years later in 1987 she was awarded the 'Culture for Peace' Premio Alghero. On both occasions she was guest of honor at the Congress of Poets and Critics held in Sardinia, Italy. In 1993 she received the poetry award ‘Letras de Oro’ of the Iberian Studies Institute in Coral Gables. More recently she participated as a special guest in the congresses of the Università degli Studi di Firenze "La parola stuadiata e creata" - Celebration of Hispanicism, and "Cuba dentro e fuori" - Cuban literature of the XIX and XX centuries (May 2007 and May 2008, respectively).

She has edited and prologued works such as the second edition of El pan de los muertos and the first edition of Cartas à la carte, both by Enrique Labrador Ruiz.

Her poems, essays and articles can be found in publications in America and Europe, from La prensa literaria in Managua and Vuelta in Mexico to Cuadernos del Matemático, Alhucema and Diario de Cuba, from Spain. She has translated several works from the Italian, including essays by Paolo Spinicci and Miguel de Unamuno, as well as poems by Antonia Pozzi and Valerio Magrelli.

Two Latin American composers have created, with some of her poems, art songs and other compositions: Cartas Interdimensionales by German Cáceres and "Epigramas" by Diana Arismendi.

An anthology of her work, Antología poética (1975-2018), was selected and introduced by Alexander Pérez-Heredia and published by Editorial Verbum (Madrid: 2019). A comprehensive selection of her poetry from 2010-2019 was translated by Erin Goodman and published by Song Bridge Press in The Miracle Unfolds (Iowa City: 2021).

== Works ==
=== Poetry collections ===
- Pan de sol. Washington: Ediciones Solar, 1976
- Las cartas y las horas. Washington: Solar, 1977
- Mar entre rejas. Washington: Solar, 1977
- Tránsito. Separata/ Papeles de Son Armadans, Madrid-Palma de Mallorca, 1978
- El arca de los sueños. Washington-Buenos Aires: Solar, 1978
- Manual de magia. Barcelona: Editorial Ambito Literario (accésit del premio de poesía en la II Bienal de1978), 1979.
- Vallejiana. En Antología Solar. Miami: Solar, 1979
- Eurídice en la fuente. Miami: Solar, 1979
- Viajes de Penélope. Prólogo de Reinaldo Arenas. Miami: Solar, 1980.
- Crónicas del Caribe. Miami: Solar, 1983
- El sol tatuado. Boston: Solar, 1986
- Arie etrusche/ Aires etruscos. Prefacio y traducción al italiano de Pietro Civitareale. Cagliari: GIA Editrice, 1987
- Plaza sitiada. Prólogo de Pablo Antonio Cuadra. Costa Rica: Libro Libre (primer volumen de la Colección -- ‘Poesía en Exilio’), 1987
- Sorbos de luz/ Sips of Light. Traducción al inglés de Mario de Salvatierra. New Orleans-San Francisco: Eboli Poetry Series, 1990
- Proyecto de infinito (plegable). New Orleans: Edizione di Amatori, 1991
- Sorbos venecianos/ Sorsi veneziani/ Venetian Sips. (50 en edición artesanal) 1992
- Florencia nuestra/ Biografía poemática. Finalista del premio de poesía ‘Juan Boscán’ de Barcelona, 1980-81/ Miami-Valencia: Arcos, 1992
- Transfiguración de la armonía. Coral Gables: La Torre de Papel, 1993
- Una estación en tren. Premio ‘Letras de Oro’ de Poesía 1992-93. University of Miami: North South Center, Iberian Studies Institute 1994
- Infancia del Pan nuestro. Boston: Poetry Planting, 1995
- Tela de concierto. Miami: El Zunzún Viajero, 1999/ Pórtico de Jesús J.Barquet
- Cadenze/ Poesie. Collana di Poesia Il Capricornio, Foggia: Bastogi Editrice Italiana, 2000/ Prefazione, Pietro Civitareale/ Nota de contratapa, Maria Grazia Lenisa
- Claves de siglo nuevo. Artes y Letras, Managua, 27 octubre 2001/ Aforismos
- Cartas y cantigas. Separata de Betania, Madrid 27 de junio de 2003
- Pensamiento del tiempo. Miami: Amatori, 2005
- Nido de soles. Amatori, Boston 2008 / Plegable con 12 poemas
- Sorbos de luz alineados. Cuadernos del Matemático, Núm.41-42, pp. 45–47
- Meditati. Udine: Campanotto Ed., Collana Internazionale, 2010 / edición bilingüe
- Soul Alphabet. Boston, 2012
- El ángel sonriente/ L ́angelo sorridente. Prefacio: Jorge De Arco. Amatori, 2013
- Puentes y plegarias/ Ponti e preghiere. El Zunzún Viajero: Boston, 2015
- Legendario Entanglement/ Leggendario Entanglement. Amatori, 2016
- Se desata el milagro / Si scatena il miracolo. Amatori, 2016
- Bosco del cuore rinascente / Bosque del corazón renaciente. El Zunzún Viajero: Boston, 2018
- Imaginando la verdad. Amatori, 2019

=== Anthologies ===
- Grumo d’alba. Plaquette in Spanish and Italian. Pisa: Giardini Editori, 1985
- Cantar de Isla. La Habana: Letras Cubanas, Poesía/Selección y prólogo Virgilio López Lemus, 2003
- Antología poética (1975-2018). Selección y prólogo: Alexander Pérez-Heredia. Editorial Verbum, 2019

=== Book translations ===
- Viajes de Penélope/ I viaggi di Penelope. Trad. Alessio Brandolini y Prefazione di Martha Canfield ("Viaggiare come sognare come cantare"). Finalista del Premio internazionale di poesia Camaiore 2008. Campanotto Editore: Udine, 2007
- Manuscript in Dreams/ Study of Chopin. Translated by Mario A. Pita. Amatori, 2010
- Manual de magia/ Manual of Magic. Translated by Donald D. Walsh. Amatori, 2011
- Viajes de Penélope/ Penelope's Journeys. Translated by Mario A. & María I. Pita, 2012
- Smiling Angel. Chapbook. A selection translated by Erin Goodman. Amatori, 2013
- Bridges and Prayers. Chapbook. A selection translated by Erin Goodman. El Zunzún Viajero: Boston, Spring 2015
- Legendary Entanglement. Chapbook. A selection translated by Erin Goodman. El Zunzún Viajero: Boston, Fall 2016
- Se Desata el Milagro. Chapbook. A selection translated by Erin Goodman. El Zunzún Viajero: Boston, Fall 2016
- The Miracle Unfolds. Selected Poetry by Juana Rosa Pita (2010-2019). Selected and translated by Erin Goodman. Song Bridge Press, 2021

=== Selected prose ===
- Isla de dos Cubanet.org
- Manuscrito en sueños/ Estudio de Chopin. Amatori, Charleston, 2009
- Jorge Ibargüengotia. Revolución en el jardín
- Javier Marías sale en defensa de nuestra lengua
- Enrique Gómez-Correa o La luminosidad del secreto
- The Splendid Legacy of Albert Camus. SOCIETY, Vol. 50 Number 6, Nov-Dec 2013
- Albert Camus: una vida por la verdad
- La utilidad de lo inútil: alegato a favor de las humanidades
- Octavio Paz: árbol centenario de la poesía
- Roberto Juarroz: La salvación por la mirada/ Le salut par le regard Revista ALBA No. 19, Paris, Junio 2014
- Various articles in Letras Libres
- Un nuevo poemario de Juana Rosa Pita. Diario de Cuba. Pietro Civitareale 9 March 2017.

== Education ==
- 1984 PhD in Hispanic Literature from the Catholic University of America.
- 1975 Master's degree from the George Mason University
- 1957 ‘Bachiller en Letras’ from Nuestra Señora de Lourdes school in Havana

== Personal life ==
Parents: Justo P. Padrón from Palmira (Cienfuegos) y Rosa Cabezón from Cárdenas. From 1960 to 1979 she was married to Mario Pita, and has three children: Maria Isabel, born in Havana, and Lourdes Maria and Mario Alejandro, born in Miami.
