= Carolina Garcia-Aguilera =

American writer (born 1949)

- Born: July 13, 1949 (age 77); Havana, Cuba
- Education: Rollins College (BA)
- Occupation: Writer

Carolina Garcia-Aguilera (born July 13, 1949) is an American writer born in Havana, Cuba. She has written seven (7) novels in a mystery series, three (3) stand-alone novels, numerous short stories and contributed to a number of Anthologies. Carolina Garcia-Aguilera moved to the United States when she was 10 years old. She attended Miss Porter's Preparatory School in Farmington, Connecticut, for high school before graduating from Rollins College in Winter Park, FL, with a B.A. in history and political science. Carolina Garcia-Aguilera went on to obtain a master's degree in Language and Linguistics, an MBA in Finance, and has continued studies for a PhD in Latin American Affairs.

In 1986 Carolina Garcia-Aguilera became a private investigator with a goal of writing a series featuring a female Cuban-American P.I. based in Miami. The first book in the Lupe (Guadalupe) Solano mystery series was published in 1996, and was followed by six (6) other Lupe Solano books. "Havana Heat" published in 2000 won the 2001 Shamus Award for Best P.I. Hard Cover Novel.

== Works ==
Lupe Solano series:

1. Bloody Waters (1996)
2. Bloody Shame (1997)
3. Bloody Secrets (1998)
4. A Miracle in Paradise (1999)
5. Havana Heat (2000)
6. Bitter Sugar (2001)
7. Bloody Twist (2010)

Other Novels: One Hot Summer (2002) was adapted as a Lifetime Movie and was released for Television on July 26, 2009. Luck of the Draw (2003). The Matriarch of the Navarro Clan decides that the family should gather and reestablish the long-lost family casino in Havana, "La Estrella", in Miami. When the family discovers that Diamond Navarro, a journalist in Las Vegas, is missing, The Matriarch orders Esmeralda Navarro, the oldest daughter of five, to Las Vegas to find Diamond and bring her home. Magnolia (2012)

Anthology Contributions: From The Private Eye Writers of America comes "Fifty Shades of Grey Fedora" (2013; edited by Robert J. Randisi, this anthology features stories by MaxAllan Collins, Sara Paretsky, John Lutz, Gary Phillips, Carolina Garcia-Aguilera and 12 others.

== See also ==
- Cuban American literature
- List of Cuban-American writers
