= Carolina García Cañón =

Mexican politician

- Born: 30 January 1981 (age 45); State of Mexico, Mexico
- Occupation: Politician
- Political party: PVEM

Carolina García Cañón (born 30 January 1981) is a Mexican politician from the Ecologist Green Party of Mexico. From 2009 to 2010 she served as Deputy of the LXI Legislature of the Mexican Congress representing the State of Mexico.
