= Roberto G. Fernández =

American novelist

- Born: 24 September 1951 (age 74); Sagua la Grande
- Occupations: Novelist, short story writer
- Writing career
- Period: 1974–present
- Genre: satire
- Notable works: Raining Backwards; Holy Radishes!

Roberto G. Fernández (born 24 September 1951) is a Cuban American novelist and short story writer. He is noted for his grotesque satires of the Cuban American community, especially in his English-language novels, Raining Backwards and Holy Radishes! In 2001, he was named the Dorothy Lois Breen Hoffman Professor of Modern Languages and Linguistics at Florida State University.

== Biography ==
=== Early life ===
Fernández's family immigrated to the States in 1961, when Fernández was 10. He grew up in Miami, which he now considers his home, although he lives and teaches in Tallahassee, Florida.

=== Literary work ===
Fernández has been said to be part of the Cuban American avant-garde. His writing is said to

engage the links among history, exile, personal, and collective identity, and simultaneously defamiliarize them through parody and pastiche, counteracting in such a move the underlying poignancy of the diasporic experience.

Fernández is known for the way he satirizes the Cuban community in Miami. One critic says that he "has mastered like no other the carnivalesque art of portraying grotesquely a community in a perpetual state of crisis". For instance, Raining Backwards depicts a generation "caught between two cultural worlds that they do not fully understand and to which they do not fully belong".

Although Fernández's first two books, written in Spanish, were "well received within the Cuban exile literary community", he did not gain wide critical attention until he published in English.

== Published works ==
- Cuentos sin rumbo [Aimless Tales] (story collection; 1975)
- La vida es un special [Life is a Bargain] (1982)
- La montaña rusa [The Roller Coaster] (story cycle; 1985)
- Raining Backwards (1988)
- Holy Radishes! (1995)
- En la ocho y la doce [The Corner of Eighth and Twelfth] (2001)
- Entre dos aguas (2007)
- El Príncipe y la Bella Cubano (2015)
- Short stories include "Wrong Channel", "The Brewery", "Is in the Stars" and "It’s not Easy"

== Awards ==
- Cintas Foundation Fellowship (1986–87)
- Florida Arts Council Fellowship (1993)

== See also ==
- Cuban American literature
- List of Cuban American writers
- List of famous Cuban-Americans.

== Critical studies in English ==
as of April 2012:

1. Water as Creator and Destroyer of Dreams and (Hyper)Realities: Hydro Symbolism in the Works of Roberto G. Fernández By: David de Posada, https://labelmelatin.com, Volume II, Spring 2012.
2. Operational (Hyper)realities in the Exilic Labyrinth: Roberto G. Fernández's Construction and Destruction of Identity through Parodic Simulacra By: David de Posada. In: DeRosa, Simulation in Media and Culture: Believing the Hype. Lanham, MD: Lexington Books; 2011. pp& nsbs; 187–197.
3. Cuban; American Literature: Suspicion of a Rupture in the Assimilation Pattern? By: Humberto López Cruz. In: N: Giordano, The Hyphenate Writer and the Legacy of Exile. New York: Bordighera Press; 2010. pp. 85–97.
4. Three Waves of Immigration Waving of Immigration:Waving (Wavene) the Flag of Patriotic Fervor By: William O. Deaver. In: Giordano, The Hyphenate Writer and the Legacy of Exile. New York: Bordighera Press; 2010. pp. 67–84.
5. Operatic Transposition and the Romantic Aesthetic in the Works of Roberto G. Fernández By: David de Posada, "Caribe: Revista de Cultura y Literatura", 11.2 (2009): 23–42.
6. Treacherous Pilgrimages: Identity and Travel in Roberto G. Fernández's The Augustflower By: Rafael Miguel Montes. In: Glassman, Tolchin, and Brahlek, Florida Studies Proceedings of the 2005 Annual Meeting of the Florida College English Association. Newcastle upon Tyne, England: Cambridge Scholars; 2006. pp. 218–27
7. Memory and Desire in Exile: The Narrative Strategies of Raining Backwards By: Arlene Guerrero-Watanabe; Caribe: Revista de Cultura y Literatura, 2004 Summer; 7 (1): 25–42.
8. La tríada Belle Glade, Miami, Xawa: Tres nombres, tres culturas y un solo espacio novelesco en la narrativa de Roberto G. Fernández By: Jorge Febles, Hispanic Journal, 2004 Spring–Fall; 25 (1–2): 225–41.
9. Roberto G. Fernández (1951–) By: Guillermo B. Irizarry, In: West-Durán, Herrera-Sobek, and Salgado, Latino and Latina Writers, I: Introductory Essays, Chicano and Chicana Authors; II: Cuban and Cuban American Authors, Dominican and Other Authors, Puerto Rican Authors. New York: Scribner's; 2004. pp. 591–611
10. Janus Identities and Forked Tongues: Two Caribbean Writers in the United States By: Rosanna Rivero Marín. New York: Peter Lang; 2004. viii, 153 pp. (book)
11. Is Memory the Amnesia You Like? Some Remarks on Self-Invention and the Presence of Caribbean Literature in North America By: Wolfgang Binder, GRAAT: Publication des Groupes de Recherches Anglo-Américaines de l'Université François Rabelais de Tours, 2003; 27: 293–99.
12. Geographies of Identity in Cuban American Narrative By: Antonia Domínguez Miguela, In: Alonso Gallo and Domínguez Miguela, Evolving Origins, Transplanting Cultures: Literary Legacies of the New Americans. Huelva, Spain: Universidad de Huelva; 2002. pp. 267–75
13. The Intercepted Space: Desired and Summed Identity in Holly [Holy] Radishes by Cuban American Writer, Roberto G. Fernández By: Clementina R. Adams, Diáspora: Journal of the Annual Afro-Hispanic Literature and Culture Conference, 2001; 11: 66–71.
14. Generational Conflicts in Raining Backwards by Roberto G. Fernández By: Henry Pérez, Publications of the Arkansas Philological Association, 2000 Fall; 26 (2): 33–44.
15. Memories of Cuba in Roberto G. Fernández's Raining Backwards By: Henry Pérez, Publications of the Arkansas Philological Association, 1998 Fall; 24 (2): 47–57.
16. Intimate Dwellings: Meditations on Shelter and Sheltered Meditations in Roberto G. Fernández's Coquina House By: William O. Deaver Jr.; RLA: Romance Languages Annual, 1998; 10 (2): 529–33.
17. Holy Radishes! Image is Everything By: William O., Deaver Jr. In: Berry, NAHLS Bringing the World Together. Ann Arbor, MI: University of Michigan; 1997. pp. 218–29
18. From Polyglossia to Disglossia: Defining Chronotope, Authority, and Subversion in Raining Backwards By: William O. Deaver Jr.; RLA: Romance Languages Annual, 1997; 9: 448–52.
19. The Prodigal Son in the Structure of Raining Backwards, Crazy Love, and Latin Jazz By: William O. Deaver Jr.; Americas Review: A Review of Hispanic Literature and Art of the USA, 1996 Fall–Winter; 24 (3–4): 179–90.
20. A Technological Novelty in Raining Backwards: The Creation of a Virtual Reality By: Humberto López Cruz, Americas Review: A Review of Hispanic Literature and Art of the USA, 1996 Fall–Winter; 24 (3–4): 191–200.
21. Menippean Satire and Skaz in Raining Backwards By: William O. Deaver Jr.; Confluencia: Revista Hispánica de Cultura y Literatura, 1996 Fall; 12 (1): 168–77.
22. Structure, Theme, Motif, and Dialogue in Raining Backwards By: William O. Deaver Jr.; Chattahoochee Review: The DeKalb College Literary Quarterly, 1996 Summer; 16 (4): 100–12.
23. Raining Backwards: Stylization and Mimicry By: William O. Deaver Jr.; RLA: Romance Languages Annual, 1995; 7: 446–49.
24. American Contradictions: Interviews with Nine American Writers By: Wolfgang Binder (ed.). Hanover, NH: University Press of New England; 1995.
25. A Connecticut Yankee in Cuban Miami: Reflections on the Meaning of Underdevelopment and Cultural Change By: Juan Leon, Michigan Quarterly Review, 1994 Fall; 33 (4): 690–701.
26. A Character's Indictment of Authorial Subterfuge: The Parody of Texts in Roberto G. Fernandez's Fiction By: Jorge Febles, In: Cancalon and Spacagna, Intertextuality in Literature and Film. Gainesville: University Press of Florida; 1994. pp. 21–35
27. Raining Backwards: Colonization and the Death of a Culture By: William O. Deaver Jr.; The Americas Review: A Review of Hispanic Literature and Art of the USA, 1993 Spring; 21 (1): 112–18.
28. English and Spanish Pop Songs as Part of Character Speech: Cultural Hybridity in Roberto G. Fernández's Raining Backwards By: Jorge Febles, IN: Ryan-Ransom, Imagination, Emblems and Expressions: Essays on Latin American, Caribbean, and Continental Culture and Identity. Bowling Green, OH: Popular; 1993. pp. 99–108
29. Gender in Exile: Mothers and Daughters in Roberto G. Fernández's Raining Backwards By: Mary S. Vásquez, IN: Whitlark and Aycock, The Literature of Emigration and Exile. Lubbock: Texas Tech University Press; 1992. pp. 79–85
30. Family, Generation, and Gender in Two Novels of Cuban Exile: Into the Mainstream? By: Mary S. Vásquez, The Bilingual Review/La revista bilingüe, 1991 Jan–Apr; 16 (1): 23–34.
31. The Fantastic and the Grotesque in the Fiction of Roberto Fernández: The Case of Raining Backwards By: Mary S. Vásquez, Confluencia: Revista Hispanica de Cultura y Literatura, 1990 Fall; 6 (1): 75–84.
32. Parody, Intertextuality and Cultural Values in Roberto G. Fernández' Raining Backwards By: Mary S. Vásquez, The Americas Review: A Review of Hispanic Literature and Art of the USA, 1990 Summer; 18 (2): 92–102.
33. Transcending the Culture of Exile: Raining Backwards By: Gabriella Ibieta, In: Bevan, Literature and Exile. Amsterdam: Rodopi; 1990. pp. 67–76
