= Carolina García (executive) =

Argentine film executive

Carolina García is an Argentine film executive. She is the Director of Original Series at Netflix.

== Early life and career ==
Born in Argentina, she was raised in California, where she immigrated with her parents, sister, and brother. She trained to be a dancer from the age of 4, and also studied to be a singer. However, watching the fictional series 24, starring Kiefer Sutherland, she decided she wanted to enter the entertainment industry. She started in this world as an intern at 20th Century Fox Television, where she worked for nine years and became manager of Current Programming.

Since 2016 she has been the director of Netflix original series. She has overseen series like Stranger Things and also worked on the distribution of Latin American series such as Chilling Adventures of Sabrina, 13 Reasons Why, Atypical and Raising Dion.

== Awards ==
García was named to Fortune's 40 under 40 in 2020. In 2021 the BBC included her in their list of the 100 most inspiring women called BBC 100 Women.
