= Eugenio Florit =

Cuban poet, translator and literary critic

Eugenio Florit y Sánchez de Fuentes (October 15, 1903 - June 22, 1999) was a Cuban writer, essayist, literary critic, translator, radio actor and diplomat.

== Biography ==
Eugenio Florit was a Cuban writer, born in Madrid in 1903. He lived in Catalonia, until 1918, the year he moved with his family to Cuba, where his mother was born. Soon he comes into contact with the cultural circles of Havana, where he stands out very quickly. Although his birth occurred in Spain and he lived in Madrid and Port Beu, the work of Eugenio Florit is heritage of the Cuban culture. In the Cuban capital he studied at Colegio La Salle, between 1918 and 1922. Then he studied law in Universidad de la Habana. In 1927 he joined the Secretaría de Estado of the government of General Gerardo Machado, a branch in which Nicolás Guillén also worked during those years. Florit was also a lecturer and radio actor. Precisely, in that period of his work in the Secretaría de Estado was when he joined the group of the Revista de Avance, a magazine of extraordinary value for the culture of the country. His main activity will be literary, in which he will focus on pure poetry, with important presence of the Spanish classics of the Siglo de Oro (Golden Century). His first book was "32 Poemas Breves", in which he uses classic, romantic and symbolist elements. In 1940, Florit was assigned to the Consulado General de Cuba in New York and that same year he received a tribute at the Instituto Hispánico de Nueva York. He was a recurring candidate for the Premio Cervantes and received numerous other distinctions from Spanish and American universities.

Although he never lost his Spanish accent and lived more than half of his life in the United States, Florit assured on numerous occasions that he considered himself Cuban. His last trip to Cuba was in 1959, the same year of the triumph of the Cuban Revolution of Fidel Castro. He was a professor of Latin American literature at Barnard College where he retired in 1969.

His bibliography reaches forty titles. In 1974 publishes “Tiempo y Agonía” where he insists on the instability between life and death and it is appreciated that he still feel nostalgia for the Island, not from a deeply painful evocation but from the poet who assumes its new circumstances and finds the way of culturally translate his feelings to poems. In 1992, he published his last work, “Hasta luego”. Florit dies in Miami in 1999.

Florit had a close relationship with the famous Spanish poet Juan Ramón Jiménez. Many of Florit's writings were collaborations with him. About Florit and his personality Jimenez expressed:

Por donde Eugenio Florit venga o vaya, anda por una senda apartada de estatuas y lirios. Exquisito de nacimiento, gris sencillo por suerte para él, está en la estirpe perpetua de la inmanente aristocracia poética y humana: el noble instinto, la buena conciencia, que con su cultivo lo miran y lo entienden todo hermano. Atenta comprensión delicada.

Eugenio Florit, esbelto tallo universal de español en Cuba. Pule su vida y su obra como ágata serena. Quedará de él en América y España, por su español perenne, una incorporación ansiosa y aguda. Lengua de pentecostés, espíritu de fuego blanco del alba y la tarde. Bella fórmula difícil que una al hombre., sin salirlo de su especie, con el rayo de luz, el surtidor y el cisne.

== Published works ==
- (1920-1927) 32 Poemas Breves
- (1927-1928) Orbita
- (1929) Nube
- (1930) Tropico
- (1930-1936) Doble Acento
- (1936-1938) Reino
- (1939) Al Unicornio
- (1940) Niño de Ayer
- (1940) Cuatro Poemas
- (1940) Canciones para la Soledad
- (1938-1944) Nuevas Poesias
- (1947) La Estrella
- (1949) Conversación con mi Padre
- (1950) Asonante Final
- (1965) Hábito de Esperanza
- (1970) Antología Penúltima
- (1974) Tiempo y Agonia
- (1992) Hasta Luego
