= Padilla affair =

Cuban poet and dissident (1932–2000)

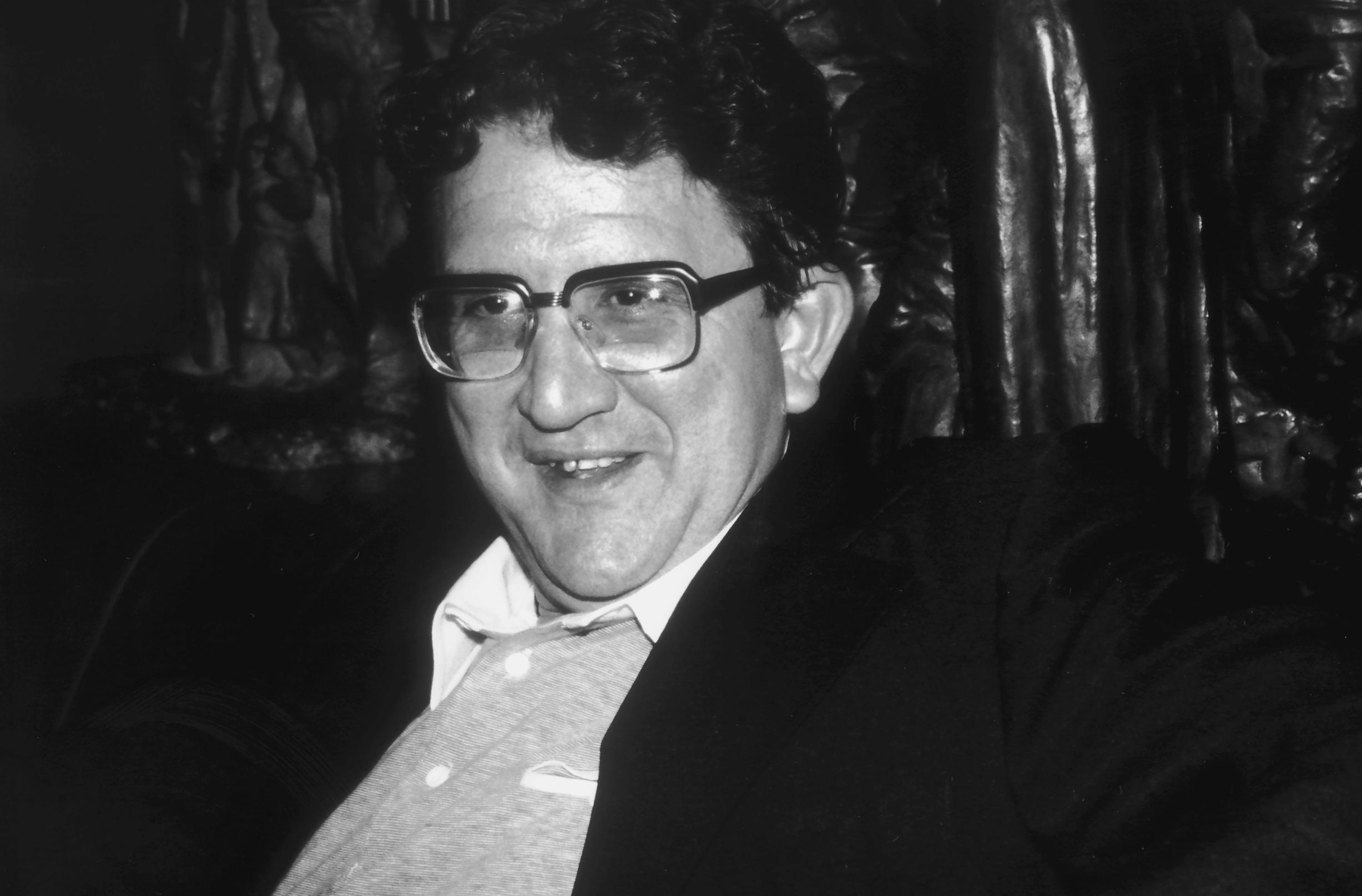
Heberto Padilla (1981).

Heberto Juan Padilla, (20 January 1932 – 25 September 2000) was a Cuban poet put to the center of the so-called Padilla affair when he was imprisoned for criticizing the Cuban government. He was born in Puerta de Golpe, Pinar del Río, Cuba. His first book of poetry, Las rosas audaces (The Audacious Roses), was published in 1949. Although Padilla initially supported the revolution led by Fidel Castro, by the late 1960s he began to criticize it openly and in 1971 he was imprisoned by the Cuban government.

== Background ==
=== Criticism of the revolution ===
A series of articles were posted in Verde Olivo, the magazine of the armed forces, under the name Leopaldo Avila, prompting a stricter outline of the government's cultural policy. The conditional tolerance of Cuban literature required more than just a basic support for the Revolution. Thus a declaration of principles was created and approved at the Congress of Writers and Artists in 1968 that further defined the role of the writer in Cuba, stating that the writer has to not only support the Revolution, but contribute to it through utilizing literature as a "weapon against weakness and problems which, directly or indirectly, could hinder this advance."

=== Foreign interactions ===
According to Cuban accounts, Padilla stirred controversy in an attempt to attract foreign attention towards his work. Writer José Lorenzo Fuentes had already been removed from the UNEAC in 1967 for his critical work and alleged contact with Central Intelligence Agency (CIA) and according to Otero, Padilla saw this scandal as an opportunity to receive foreign attention. Jorge Edwards, a Chilean diplomat critical of the Castro government, would also support Otero's views that Padilla sought international recognition, noting that Padilla's interactions with foreigners attracted the attention of Cuba's intelligence service. Padilla's contact with foreign individuals reportedly included those working with the CIA, though this has been disputed.

== Affair ==
=== Imprisonment ===
With the strengthening of the overall cultural policy of the Cuban government in an attempt to avoid the weakening of the Revolutionary ideology, vigilance towards Cuban writers had increased, punishing them for even slightly deviating from Castro's communist praxis. Thus on March 20, 1971, Heberto Padilla was arrested and jailed for his work, Fuera del juego. To illustrate the trivial nature of revolutionary vigilance, one of the charges brought against Fuera del juego was Padilla's conception of history, where he described time as a circle. This was seen as counterrevolutionary. In UNEAC's official point of view, they stated, "He has expressed his anti-historical attitude by means of exalting individualism in opposition to collective demands of a country in the midst of historical development and by also stating his idea of time as a reoccurring a repeating circle instead of an ascending line."

=== Controversy ===
Padilla was released thirty-seven days after being imprisoned, but not before delivering a statement of self-criticism to a UNEAC meeting. In this statement he had confessed to the charges brought against him, describing himself to be what his adversaries accused him of being: a counterrevolutionary, subtle, insidious, and malignant. He had also accused other writers, including his own wife, and urged them to follow his lead of conforming to the Revolutionary society.

The confession raised concerns that the Cuban government had begun to stage events reminiscent to the Moscow trials of Joseph Stalin. After Padilla's statement of self-criticism, a number of prominent Latin American, North American, and European intellectuals, including Mario Vargas Llosa, Julio Cortázar, Susan Sontag, and Jean-Paul Sartre, spoke out against Padilla's incarceration, and the resulting controversy came to be known as "the Padilla affair." The affair stirred a schism among political critics across the world, bringing many who had previously supported the Fidel Castro government to reconsider their position. The international criticism led to increased cultural polarization within Cuba as the government viewed the reaction as a foreign conspiracy.

Though Padilla was released from prison, he was still not allowed to leave the country until 1980.

== Aftermath ==
He lived in New York, Washington, D.C. and Madrid, before finally settling in Princeton, NJ. Padilla was a Fellow at the Woodrow Wilson International Center for Scholars. Farrar Straus & Giroux published several editions of his poetry, a novel, En mi jardín pastan los héroes (translated as Heroes Are Grazing in My Garden), and a book of memoirs, La mala memoria (translated as Self-Portrait of the Other).

He was the Elena Amos Distinguished Scholar in Latin American Studies at Columbus State University, Columbus GA, 1999–2000. He died on 25 September 2000 whilst teaching at Auburn University in Auburn, Alabama.

== Personal life ==
After his first marriage to Bertha Hernandez, with whom he had three children, Giselle Padilla, Maria Padilla and Carlos Padilla, he married poet Belkis Cuza Malé, with whom he had his younger son, Ernesto Padilla. His marriage to Belkis Cuza Male ended in divorce. Heberto Padilla's survivors include three children from his first marriage and a son from his second marriage.

== Works ==
=== Poetry ===
- Las rosas audaces, 1949
- El justo tiempo humano, 1962
- La hora, Cuadernos de Poesía 10 (Sets of Poems 10), La Tertulia, La Habana, 1964
- Fuera del juego, 1968
- Provocaciones, 1973
- Poesía y política - Poetry and Politics, bilingual anthology, Playor, Madrid, Georgetown University Cuban series, 1974
- El hombre junto al mar, Seix Barral, Barcelona, 1981
- Un puente, una casa de piedra, 1998
- Puerta de Golpe, anthology created by Belkis Cuza Malé, Linden Lane Press, 2013
- Una época para hablar, anthology that contains all of Padilla's poetry, Luminarias / Letras Cubanas, 2013

=== Narratives ===
- El buscavidas, novel, 1963
- En mi jardín pastan los héroes, novel, Editorial Argos Vergara, Barcelona, 1981
- La mala memoria, memoir, Plaza & Janés, Barcelona, 1989 (Eng. translation: Self-portrait of the other 1989)
- Prohibido el gato, political novel written in 1989
