= Frances Aparicio =

Puerto Rican writer

Frances Rivera Aparicio (née Rivera; born December 11, 1955, in Santurce, Puerto Rico) is the author of Listening to Salsa: Gender, Latin Popular Music, and Puerto Rican Cultures (ISBN 978-0-8195-6308-8). She is also the co-author of Musical Migrations: Transnationalism and Cultural Hybridity in Latin/o America, Volume I and Tropicalizations: Transcultural Representations of Latinidad (Re-Encounters with Colonialism). She is the editor of several books including Latino Voices. She has been a professor at Northwestern University and University of Illinois at Chicago, where she directed the Latina/Latino Studies Program.

She moved to the United States to earn her bachelor's at Indiana University Bloomington. She earned a Ph.D. at Harvard University. She is an editorial advisory board member of Chasqui, a Latin American and Latinx literature, philosophy, and arts journal.
