= Gustavo Pérez Firmat =

American novelist

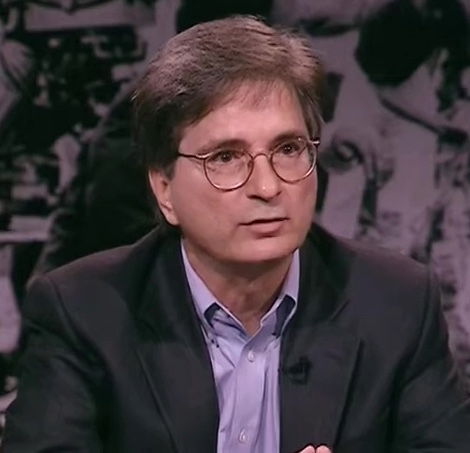
- Firmat on CUNY TV's City Cinematheque, 2003
- Born: 1949 (age 76–77); Havana, Cuba
- Education: Miami-Dade Community College; University of Miami; University of Michigan
- Occupations: Writer, professor
- Website: Official website

Gustavo Pérez Firmat (born 1949) was born in Havana, Cuba, and raised in Miami, Florida. He attended Miami-Dade Community College, the University of Miami, and the University of Michigan, where he earned a Ph.D. in Comparative Literature. He taught at Duke University from 1979 to 1999 and at Columbia University until 2022. He is currently the David Feinson Professor Emeritus of Humanities at Columbia University.

Pérez Firmat is the author of many books and essays on literature, philosophy, and culture. His poems, translations, critical and personal essays have appeared in many magazines, journals and anthologies. He has also published collections of poetry in English and Spanish. Next Year in Cuba, a memoir, was nominated for a Pulitzer Prize in non-fiction in 1995. Life on the Hyphen, a study of Cuban-American culture, was awarded the Eugene M. Kayden Award for 1994 and received Honorable Mention in the Modern Language Association’s Katherine Singer Kovács Prize and the Latin American Studies Association’s Bryce Wood Book Award.

== Honors ==
Pérez Firmat is a member of the American Academy of Arts and Sciences and has been the recipient of fellowships from the John Simon Guggenheim Foundation, the National Endowment for the Humanities, the American Council of Learned Societies, and the Mellon Foundation. In 1995, Pérez Firmat was named Duke University Scholar/Teacher of the Year. In 1997 Newsweek included him among “100 Americans to watch for the 21st century” and Hispanic Business Magazine selected him as one of the “100 most influential Hispanics” in the United States. In 2004 he was named one of New York’s thirty “outstanding Latinos” by El Diario La Prensa. He was featured in the documentary CubAmerican and in the 2013 PBS series Latino Americans.

== See also ==
- Latino literature

== Works ==
Scholarly Works

- Idle Fictions (Duke, 1982; rev. ed. 1993)
- Literature and Liminality (Duke, 1986)
- The Cuban Condition (Cambridge, 1989; rpt. 2005)
- Do the Americas Have a Common Literature? (Duke, 1990)
- Life on the Hyphen (Texas, 1994, Rpt. 1996, 1999; revised and expanded edition 2012); Spanish version: Vidas en vilo, Colibrí, 2000; rev. ed. Hypermedia, 2015)
- My Own Private Cuba (Colorado, 1999)
- Tongue Ties (Palgrave, 2003)
- The Havana Habit (Yale, 2010)
- The Norton Anthology of Latino Literature [Co-editor] (Norton, 2010)
- A Cuban in Mayberry: Looking Back at America's Hometown (Texas, 2014)
- Poesía romántica inglesa by Heberto Padilla [Editor] (Linden Lane Press, 2018)
- Fuera del juego y otras poemas by Heberto Padilla [co-editor with Yannelys Aparicio Molina] (Ediciones Catédra, 2021)
- Saber de ausencia. Lecturas de poetas cubanos (y algo más) (Renacimiento, 2022)

Creative Works

- Carolina Cuban (Bilingual Press, 1987)
- Equivocaciones (Betania, 1989)
- Bilingual Blues (Bilingual Press, 1995)
- Next Year in Cuba: A Cubano's Coming-of-Age in America (Doubleday 1995; rev. ed. 2000; rpt. Arte Público, 2005; Spanish version: El año que viene estamos en Cuba, Arte Público, 1997)
- Cincuenta lecciones de exilio y desexilio (Universal, 2000; rev. ed. Hypermedia, 2016)
- Anything But Love (Arte Público, 2000)
- Scar Tissue (Bilingual Press, 2005)
- The Last Exile (Finishing Line Press, 2016)
- Sin lengua, deslenguado (Ediciones Cátedra, 2017)
- Viejo Verde (Main Street Rag, 2019)
- The Mayberry Chronicles (Finishing Line Press, 2021)

== Interviews ==
- A Poet's Truth: Conversations With Latino/Latina Poets. Interview by Bruce Allen Dick. Tucson: University of Arizona Press, 2003.
- "Gustavo Pérez Firmat, poeta deslenguado." Interview by José Antonio Martínez. "Los personas del verbo." Onda regional de Murcia, November 25, 2017.
- "Gustavo Pérez Firmat, con la lengua afuera." Interview by Yannelys Aparicio. Revista Letral 19 (2017): 139-145.
- "Un barrio de La Habana llamado Miami, un suburbio de Miami llamado La Habana." Interview by Jorge Enrique Lage. Hypermedia Magazine. April 20, 2016. https://hypermediamagazine.com/2016/04/19/jorge-enrique-lage-un-barrio-de-la-habana-llamado-miami-un-suburbio-de-miami-llamado-la-habana
- "Living in Parts, Dreaming of Wholeness." Interview by Aneta Pavlenko. Psychology Today. March 22, 2016. https://www.psychologytoday.com/blog/life-bilingual/201603/living-in-parts-dreaming-wholeness
- "¿Existe una literatura cubanoamericana?"Interview by José Prats Sariol. Diario de Cuba, January 18, 2014. http://www.diariodecuba.com/cultura/1389988797_6740.html
- "For a Bilingual Writer No One True Language." National Public Radio Morning Edition. October 17, 2011. http://npr.org/2011/10/17/141368408/for-a-bilingual-writer-no-one-true-language
- “El Derecho a la Equivocación: Conversación con Gustavo Pérez Firmat." Interview by Rolando Pérez (Cuban poet). Boletín de la Academia Norteamericana de la Lengua Española. No. 14. 2011: 351-363. https://www.academia.edu/4895461/_El_Derecho_a_la_Equivocaci%C3%B3n_Conversaci%C3%B3n_con_Gustavo_P%C3%A9rez_Firmat_
