= List of Cuban Americans =

This is a list of notable Cuban Americans, including immigrants who obtained American citizenship and their American descendants.

== Athletes ==
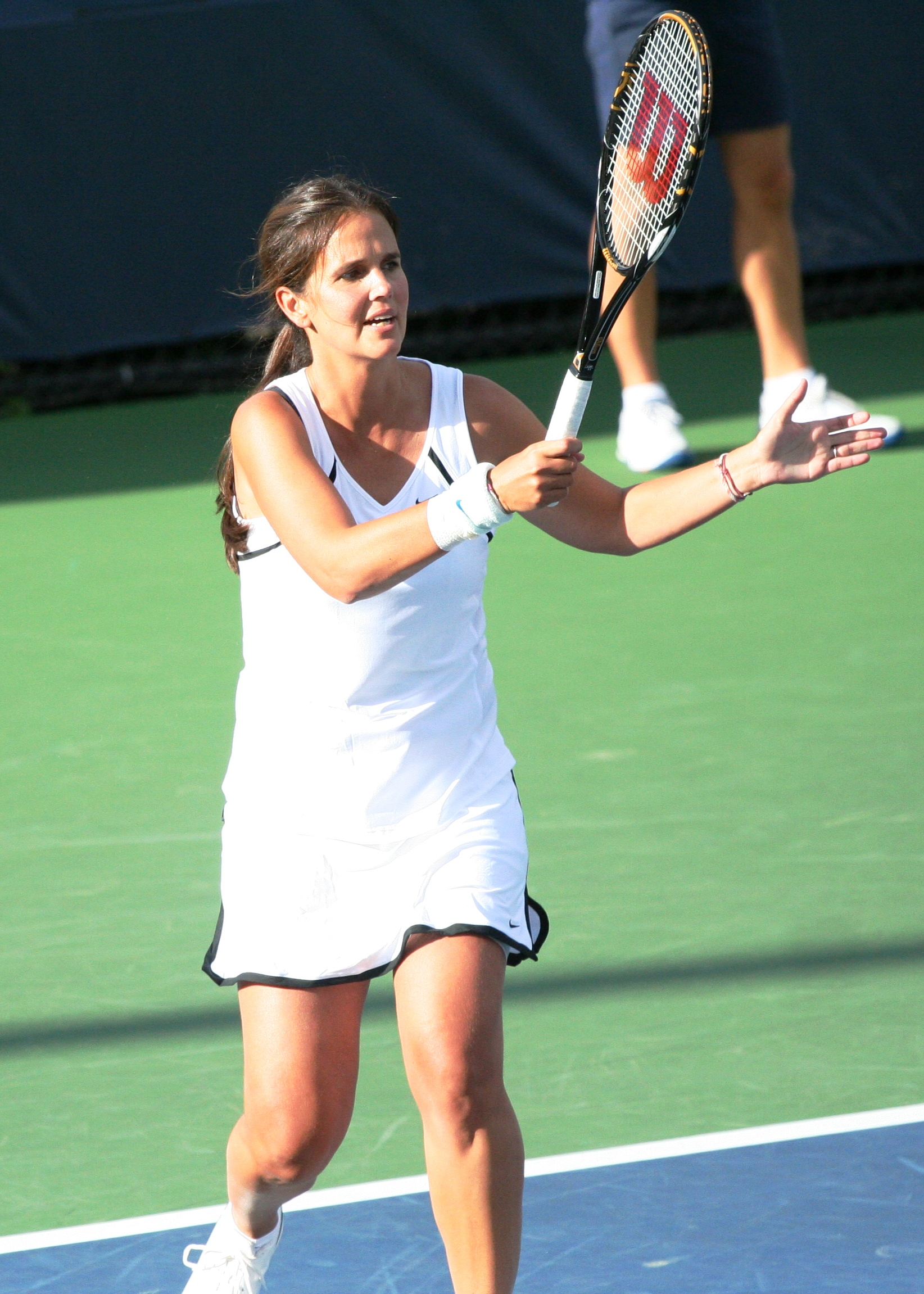
Mary Joe Fernández

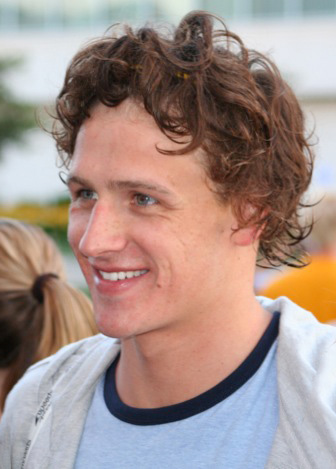
Ryan Lochte

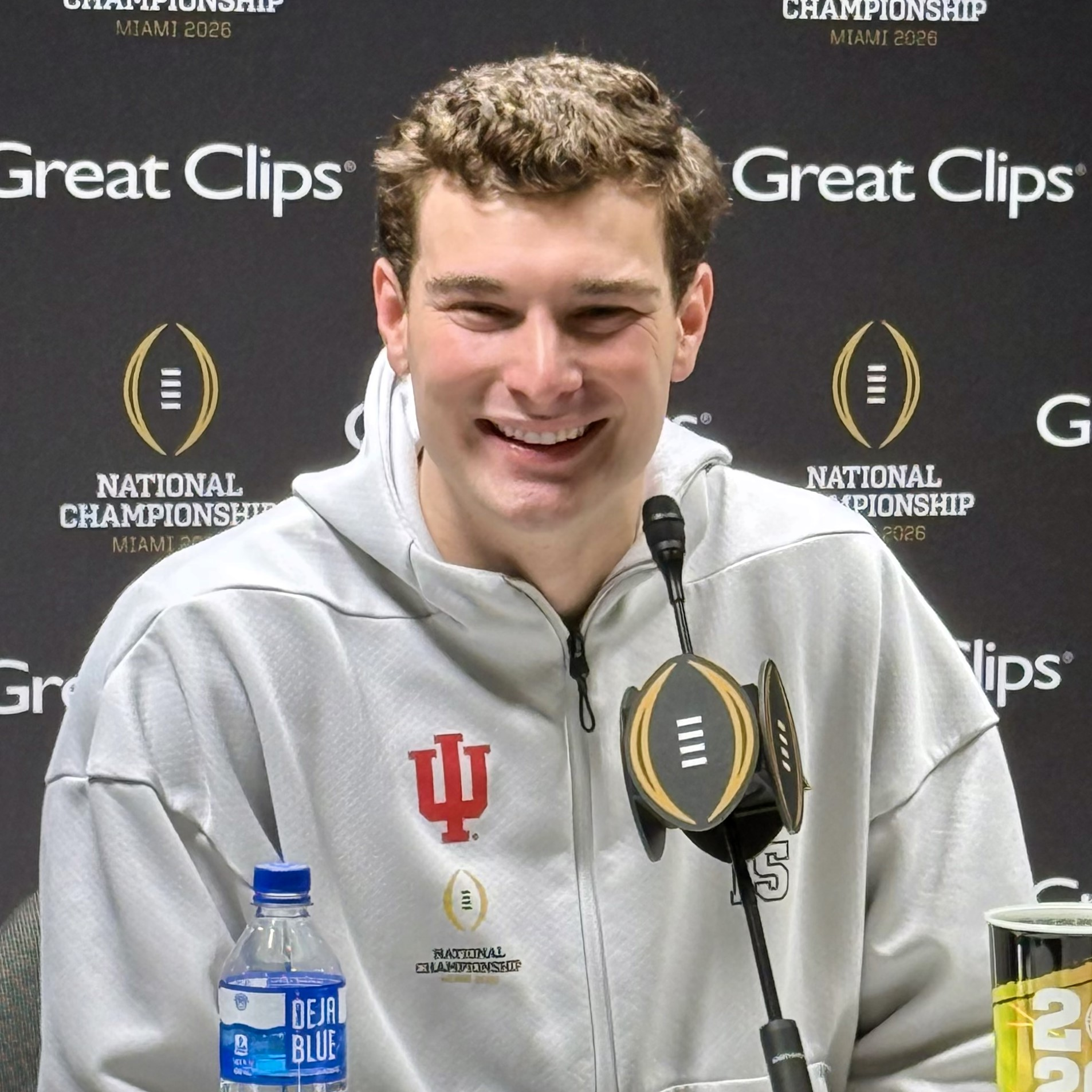
Fernando Mendoza

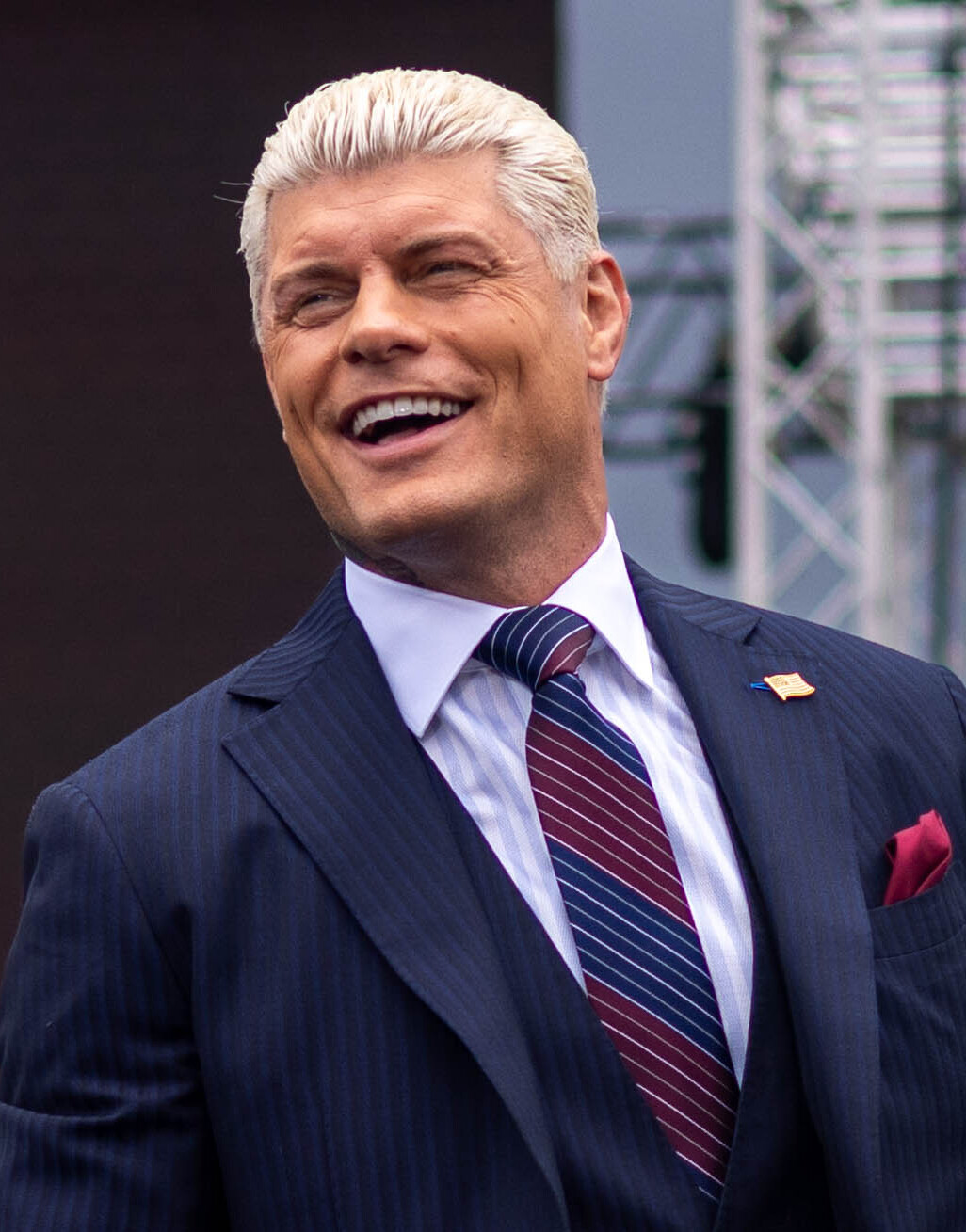
Cody Rhodes

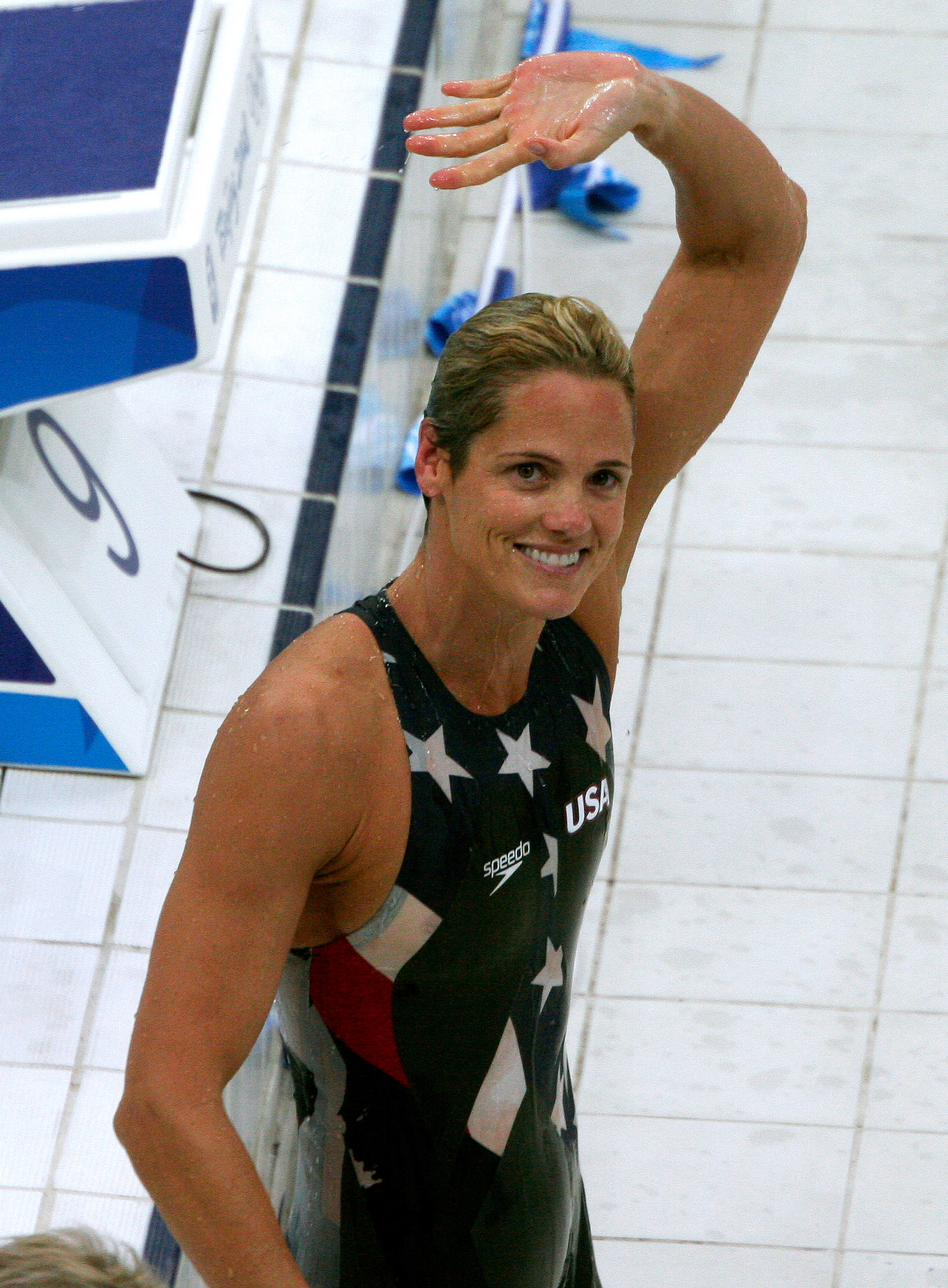
Dara Torres

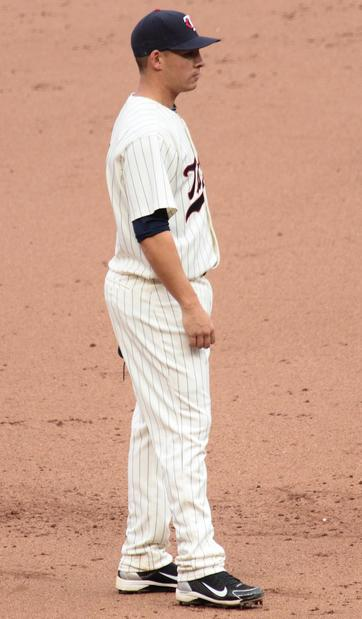
Danny Valencia

- Aric Almirola, current NASCAR driver, father born in Cuba
- Kiko Alonso, current NFL player for the Miami Dolphins, father is Cuban-born
- Osvaldo Alonso, midfielder for Minnesota United soccer team, Cuban-born
- Carlos Alvarez, former college football player for the University of Florida, known as "The Cuban Comet", Cuban-born
- Robert Andino, infielder for the Baltimore Orioles, Cuban-born
- Gilbert Arenas, professional basketball player with the Washington Wizards, great-grandfather is Cuban-born
- Javier Arenas, cornerback and punt returner for the Arizona Cardinals
- J. P. Arencibia, current catcher for the Toronto Blue Jays, parents are Cuban-born
- René Arocha, former MLB pitcher, Cuban-born
- Rolando Arrojo, former MLB pitcher, Cuban-born
- Bronson Arroyo, starting pitcher for the Arizona Diamondbacks and member of World Champion 2004 Boston Red Sox; Cuban father
- Alex Avila, current catcher for the Detroit Tigers, father is Cuban-born
- Danys Báez, relief pitcher for the Philadelphia Phillies, Cuban-born
- Zach Banks-Calderín, racing driver, mother is Cuban-born
- Yan Barthelemí, Cuban-born professional boxer
- Steve Bellán, former baseball player, Cuban-born
- Yuniesky Betancourt, former MLB pitcher, Cuban-born
- Bert Campaneris, former MLB All-Star shortstop, Cuban-born
- Bárbaro Cañizares, current first baseman, Cuban-born
- José Canseco, former MLB All-Star outfielder and DH; author (Juiced); reality show contestant (The Surreal Life), Cuban-born
- Ozzie Canseco, former MLB outfielder, Cuban-born
- José Raúl Capablanca, world chess champion from 1921 to 1927
- Rene Capo, former Olympic judoka
- José Cardenal, former MLB outfielder and coach, Cuban-born
- John Carlos, Olympic track and field medalist, professional football player, founding member of the Olympic Project for Human Rights; Cuban mother
- Joel Casamayor, Cuban professional boxer
- Nick Castellanos, Detroit Tigers
- Elieser Castillo, Cuban professional boxer
- Eliseo Castillo, Cuban professional boxer
- Yoenis Céspedes, outfielder with the New York Mets, Cuban-born
- Aroldis Chapman, relief pitcher for the New York Yankees, Cuban-born
- Vinnie Chulk, relief pitcher for the San Francisco Giants
- José Contreras, current MLB free agent pitcher, Cuban-born
- Mike Cuellar, former MLB All-Star pitcher, Cuban-born
- Orestes Destrade, former MLB first baseman and current broadcaster, Cuban-born
- Eric Eichmann, former US National Team and American professional soccer player; Cuban mother
- Yunel Escobar, current shortstop for the Los Angeles Angels, Cuban-born
- Alex Fernandez, former pitcher for the Florida Marlins
- Mary Joe Fernández, tennis player
- Osvaldo Fernández, former MLB pitcher for the Cincinnati Reds, Cuban-born
- José Fernandez, former MLB pitcher for the Miami Marlins, Cuban-born
- Tony Fossas, former MLB relief pitcher, Cuban-born
- Ryan Freel, former MLB utility player
- Tito Fuentes, former MLB second baseman, Cuban-born
- Yuriorkis Gamboa, "El Ciclón de Guantanamo", professional boxer
- Danny Garcia, former MLB outfielder, Kansas City Royals
- Preston Gómez, former MLB infielder and manager, Cuban-born
- Anthony Gonzalez, WR Atlanta Falcons National Football League
- Gio González, current MLB pitcher for the Washington Nationals
- Joaquin Gonzalez, offensive line, Indianapolis Colts, National Football League
- Luis Gonzalez, former outfielder for the Arizona Diamondbacks
- Yasmani Grandal, current catcher for the Chicago White Sox, Cuban-born
- Sammy Guevara, professional wrestler
- Henry Gutierrez, former US National Team and American professional soccer player
- Ricky Gutiérrez, former shortstop
- Annia Hatch, originally Annia Portuondo; Cuban-American gymnast, former member of Cuban and U.S. National gymnastics teams; 1993 World Gymnastics Championships and 1995 Pan American Games medal winner (representing Cuba); 2004 Olympics medal winner (representing USA); U.S. Classic winner
- Enrique Hernández, infielder/outfielder for the Los Angeles Dodgers; Cuban mother
- Evelio Hernández, starting pitcher for the Washington Senators, Cuban-born
- James "Chico" Hernandez, of Wheaties fame; US Sombo Wrestling Champion; World Cup silver; three-time British silver medalist
- Liván Hernández, former MLB pitcher, Cuban-born
- Orlando Hernández, "El Dueque" (The Duke) half-brother of Liván, former MLB player, Cuban-born
- Eric Hosmer, first baseman for the Kansas City Royals
- Raúl Ibañez, left fielder for the Los Angeles Angels of Anaheim
- José Iglesias, current MLB shortstop for the Detroit Tigers, Cuban-born
- Jon Jay, outfielder for the Chicago Cubs
- Shiloh Keo, football safety; Cuban mother.
- Danell Leyva, Olympic gymnast
- Ryan Lochte, gold medal Olympic swimmer
- Doug Logan, chief executive officer of USA Track & Field, the national governing body for track and field, long-distance running, and race walking
- Neil Lomax, former quarterback for the St. Louis Cardinals
- Hector Lombard, mixed martial artist; Judo competitor at 2000 Sydney Olympics
- Brook Lopez, current NBA player for the Milwaukee Bucks; Cuban father
- Mickey Lopez, former second baseman
- Robin Lopez, current NBA player for the Milwaukee Bucks; Cuban father
- Frank Martin, current head men's basketball coach at South Carolina
- J. D. Martinez, current MLB player
- Jorge Masvidal, mixed martial artist
- Christina McHale, professional women's tennis player
- Fernando Mendoza, football player and 2025 Heisman Trophy winner
- Minnie Miñoso, former MLB All-Star outfielder, Cuban-born
- Frank Mir, mixed martial artist and former UFC Heavyweight Champion
- Al Montoya, current goalkeeper for the Winnipeg Jets of the NHL
- Pablo Morales, Olympic swimmer
- Kendrys Morales, current first baseman for the Toronto Blue Jays, Cuban-born
- Alex Ochoa, former MLB outfielder and current first base coach in the Boston Red Sox organization
- Sergio Oliva, former 3-time Mr. Olympia; only bodybuilder to have ever beaten Arnold Schwarzenegger in a Mr. Olympia competition
- Tony Oliva, former MLB All-Star outfielder, Cuban-born
- Rey Ordóñez, former shortstop, New York Mets, Cuban-born
- Henry Owens, former relief pitcher for the Florida Marlins
- Ferdie Pacheco, physician for Muhammad Ali, boxing commentator
- Orlando Palmeiro, former MLB outfielder and pinch-hitter
- Rafael Palmeiro, former MLB All-Star first baseman and member of the 3,000 Hit and 500 Home Run clubs, Cuban-born
- Camilo Pascual, former MLB pitcher, Cuban-born
- Brayan Peña, current MLB catcher, Cuban-born
- Eduardo Pérez, former MLB first baseman and current bench coach of the Houston Astros
- Tony Pérez, MLB Hall of Fame first baseman and third baseman, Cuban-born
- Jorge Posada, catcher for the New York Yankees; Cuban father
- Yasiel Puig, MLB outfielder, Cuban-born
- Alexei Ramírez, current shortstop for the Chicago White Sox, Cuban-born
- Nap Reyes, former MLB infielder, Cuban-born
- Guillermo Rigondeaux, Cuban professional boxer
- Amy Rodriguez, frontline for U.S. women's national soccer team
- Jennifer Rodriguez, Olympic medal-winning speed skater
- Sean Rodriguez, second baseman for the Tampa Bay Rays
- Cookie Rojas, former MLB infielder and manager, Cuban-born
- Yoel Romero, mixed martial artist
- Cody Rhodes, professional wrestler; Cuban maternal grandfather
- Alberto Salazar, runner, marathon winner, and coach until he was banned
- Alex Sánchez, former outfielder, Cuban-born
- David Segui, former MLB first baseman
- Havana Solaun, former member of the U.S. women's national under-17 soccer team who now represents Jamaica; Cuban paternal grandparents
- Odlanier Solís, Cuban professional boxer
- Danny Tartabull, former MLB All-Star outfielder
- Tony Taylor, former MLB infielder, Cuban-born
- Luis Tiant, former MLB All-Star pitcher, Cuban-born
- Dara Torres, Olympic gold-medalist swimmer (1984, 1988, 1992, 2000, 2008)
- Danny Valencia, American-Israeli MLB and Team Israel third baseman
- Lola Vice, professional wrestler and former mixed martial artist.
- Priscilla Zuniga, professional wrestler known by her ring names Angel Rose and Diamante

== Business ==
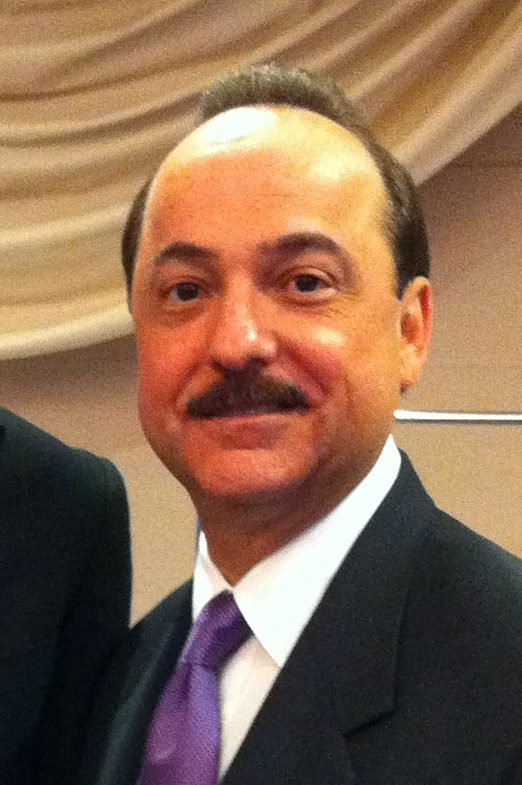
Ralph de la Vega

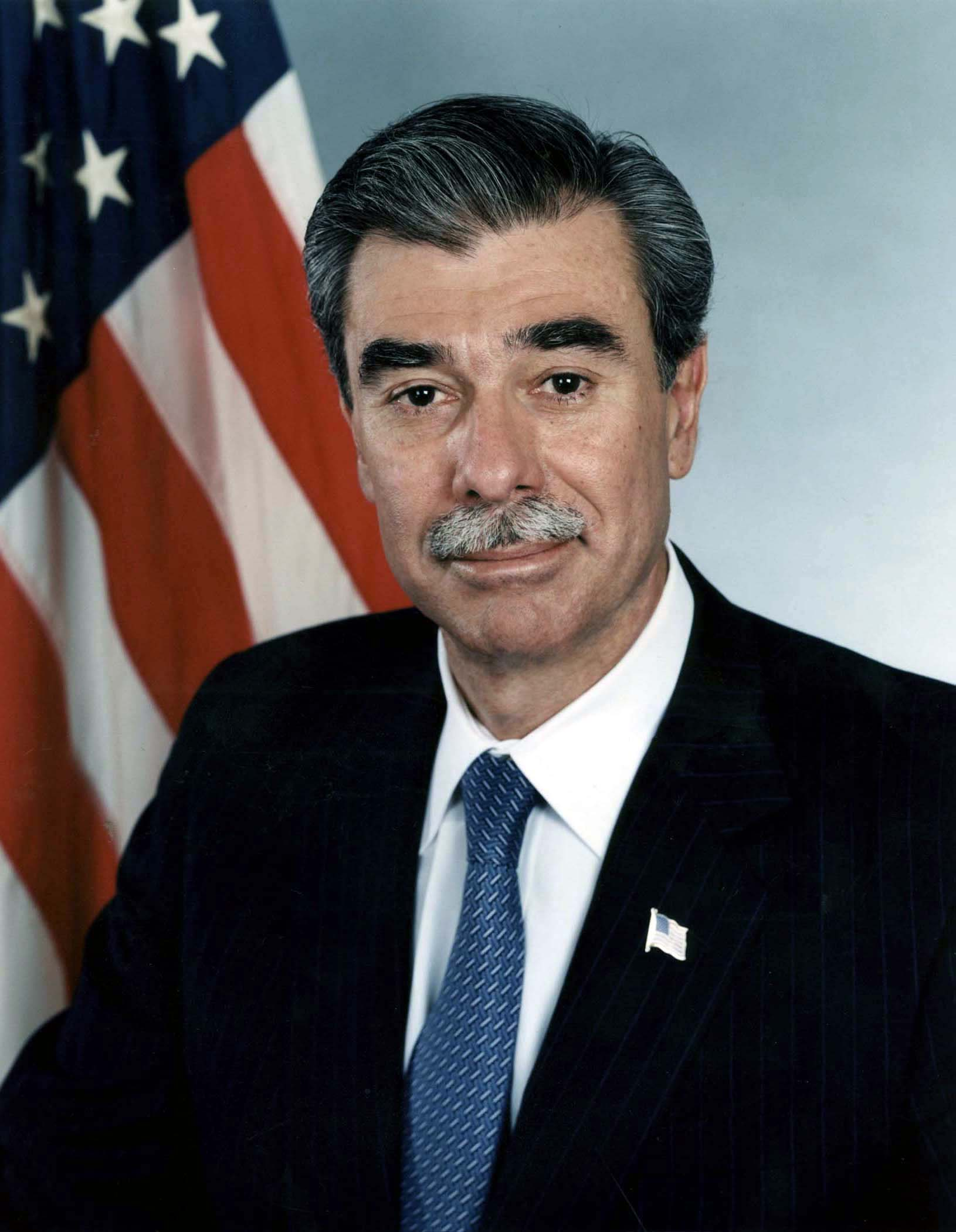
Carlos Gutierrez

- Raúl Alarcón, president and CEO of the Spanish Broadcasting System
- Alfredo Alonso, SVP of Clear Channel Radio
- Ralph Alvarez, former president and COO of McDonald's
- Bacardi family, owners of Bacardi Rums, Grey Goose, Martini & Rossi and Dewar's
- Mario Baeza, Cuban-American corporate lawyer, investment and merchant banker, entrepreneur, musician/composer and philanthropist
- Charles "Bebe" Rebozo, banker, close confidant of President Richard Nixon; key Watergate scandal figure
- Jorge Mas Canosa, founder and CEO of MasTec, political activist, former head of Cuban-American National Foundation
- Paul L. Cejas, CEO of PLC Investments, Inc.
- Mauricio Claver-Carone, lawyer and president of the Inter-American Development Bank
- Carlos de la Cruz, Cuban-born American businessman, the chairman of CC1 Companies, Inc. which include Coca-Cola Puerto Rico Bottlers, CC1 Beer Distributors, Inc., Coca-Cola Bottlers Trinidad & Tobago, and Florida Caribbean Distillers, LLC. The companies together employ 2,500 people and have annual sales of $1 billion
- Ralph de la Vega, former president and CEO of AT&T Mobility
- Alfonso Fanjul Sr. (1909–1980), Cuban-born American sugar baron
- Alfonso Fanjul Jr., sugar baron
- Jose Fanjul, sugar baron
- Joe Fernandez, entrepreneur, founder of Klout
- Raul J. Fernandez, co-owner of the NBA Washington Wizards, NHL Washington Capitals and WNBA Washington Mystics
- Jorge Figueredo, Senior Vice President of Dow Jones
- Ella Fontanals-Cisneros, Cuban-born art collector and the founder and president of the Cisneros Fontanals Art Foundation
- Roberto C. Goizueta, former CEO of the Coca-Cola Company
- Sara Del Carmen Jofre González (1935–2008), President and CEO of the Georgia Hispanic Chamber of Commerce (1996–2008)
- Nelson Gonzalez, co-founder of Alienware
- Efraim Grinberg, CEO of Movado watches
- Gedalio Grinberg, founder and former CEO of Movado watches
- Carlos Gutierrez, former CEO of Kellogg Company
- Armando Gutierrez, Cuban-born American banker, political consultant, and entrepreneur
- Bobby Maduro, baseball entrepreneur; owner of Havana Sugar Kings
- Alex Meruelo, CEO of the Muruelo Group
- Alvaro de Molina, Chief Financial Officer of Bank of America Corporation
- Antonio Luis Navarro, former vice president of W. R. Grace and Company
- Jesús Permuy, architect, urban planner, and human rights advocate
- Joe Quesada, CCO of Marvel Entertainment; former editor-in-chief of Marvel Comics
- George Reyes, Chief Financial Officer of Google
- Marcos A. Rodriguez, entrepreneur, broadcaster, movie producer
- Felix Sabates, entrepreneur, philanthropist, holds ownership in NASCAR, Charlotte Bobcats
- Ralph Sanchez, autoracing promoter, developer, responsible for Grand Prix of Miami and Homestead-Miami Speedway
- Alberto Vilar, a.k.a. Albert Vilar, American former investment manager who became particularly known for donating tens of millions as a patron of opera

== Education ==
- Alejandro Anreus, art historian and curator, William Paterson University
- Ruth Behar, anthropologist, poet, and filmmaker; first Latina recipient of a MacArthur award, University of Michigan
- Max Berre, Paris-based policy economist specializing in finance, SME economics, and sovereign risk. Creator of the "Bridge-to-Macro" concept in entrepreneurial finance, EDC Paris Business School
- George J. Borjas, Robert W. Scrivner Professor of Economics and Social Policy, Harvard University
- Ana Mari Cauce, President of the University of Washington, Seattle
- Frederick A. de Armas, Andrew W. Mellon Distinguished Service Professor in Romance Languages and Literatures and Comparative Literature University of Chicago
- Alejandro de la Fuente, Robert Woods Professor of Latin American History and Economics, Harvard University
- Ingrid Brioso Rieumont, Assistant Professor of Spanish and Portuguese, Dartmouth College
- Miguel A. De La Torre, prolific author on Hispanic religiosity, Iliff School of Theology
- Jorge I. Dominguez, Antonio Madero Professor of Mexican and Latin American Politics and Economics, former chairman of the Harvard Academy for International and Area Studies, Harvard University
- Roberto González Echevarría, Sterling Professor of Hispanic and Comparative Literature, Yale University
- Carlos M. N. Eire, T. Lawrason Riggs Professor of History and Religious Studies at Yale University; his memoir of the Cuban Revolution, Waiting for Snow in Havana (Free Press, 2003), won the National Book Award for non-fiction
- Maria Cristina Garcia, Howard A. Newman Professor of American Studies at Cornell University; historian of immigration
- Jorge J. E. Gracia, Samuel P. Capen Chair in Philosophy, University at Buffalo
- Robert Lima, Knight Commander, Order of Queen Isabel of Spain; academician ANLE; Corr. Member RAE; emeritus Professor and emeritus Fellow, IAH (Penn State University)
- Modesto A. Maidique, former president of Florida International University
- Elsa A. Murano, former Undersecretary for Food Safety at U.S. Department of Agriculture, former president of Texas A&M University, former vice chancellor of Agriculture & Life Sciences of Texas A&M University, current director of the Norman E. Borlaug Institute for International Agriculture of Texas A&M University
- Eduardo J. Padrón, president of Miami Dade College, immediate past chair of the board of directors of the American Council on Education (ACE)
- Luis G Pedraja, president of Quinsigamond Community College, educator, philosopher and theologian
- Gustavo Pérez Firmat, David Feinson Professor in the Humanities, Columbia University
- Alejandro Portes, Professor of Sociology, director of the Center for Migration and Development, Princeton University
- Gregory Rabassa, literary translator and Distinguished Professor in the Department of Languages and Literatures at Queens College, City University of New York and in the Ph.D. Program in Hispanic and Luso-Brazilian Literatures of the Graduate School and University Center of the CUNY Graduate Center
- Carmen Reinhart, Minos A. Zombanakis Professor of the International Financial System, Harvard Kennedy School
- Teofilo Ruiz, Distinguished Professor of History, UCLA and recipient of the National Humanities Medal at the White House
- Rubén G. Rumbaut, Professor of Sociology, University of California, Irvine
- Ernest Sosa, Board of Governors Professor of Philosophy, Rutgers University
- Armando Vilaseca, commissioner of the Vermont Department of Education

== Entertainment ==
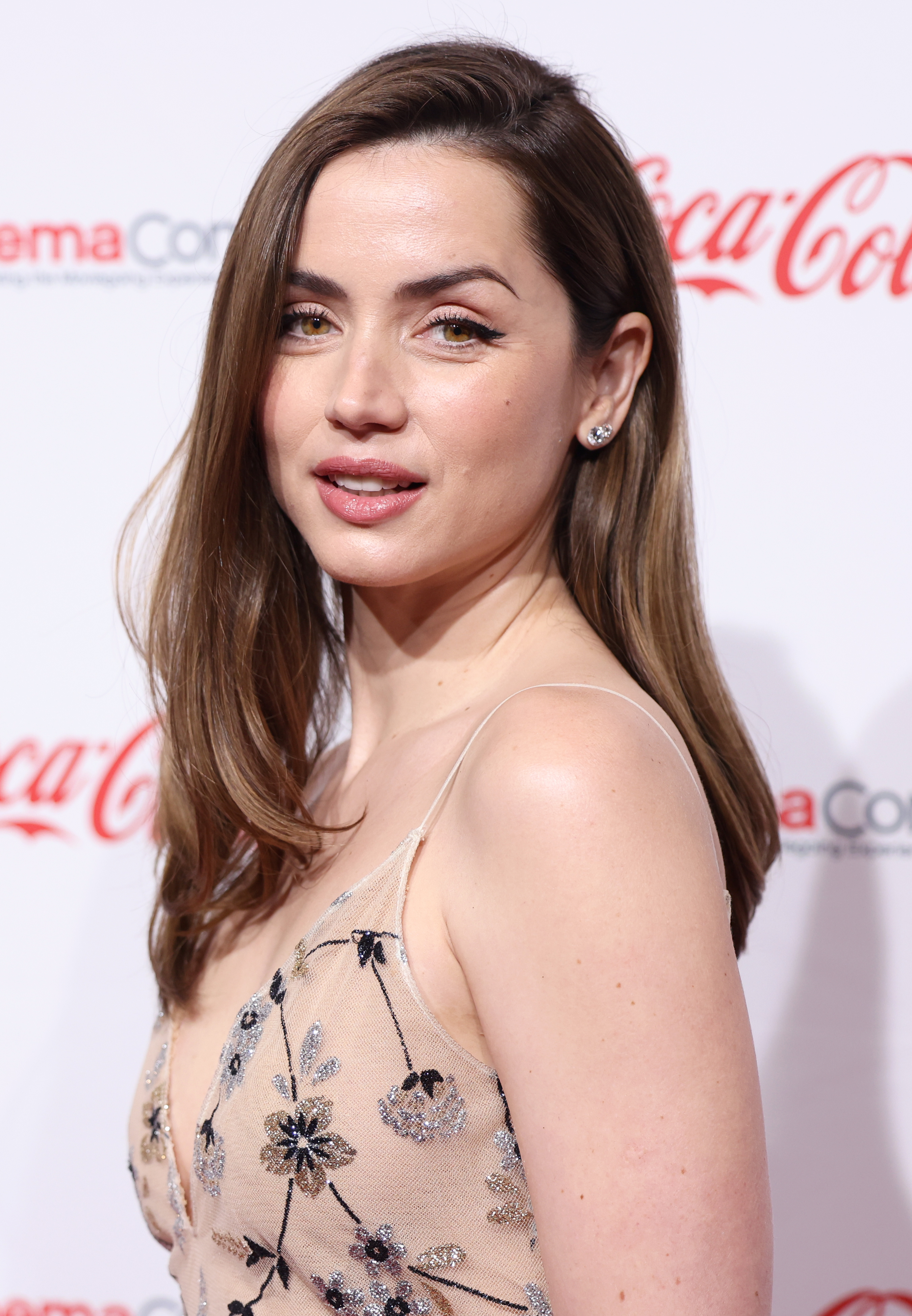
Ana de Armas

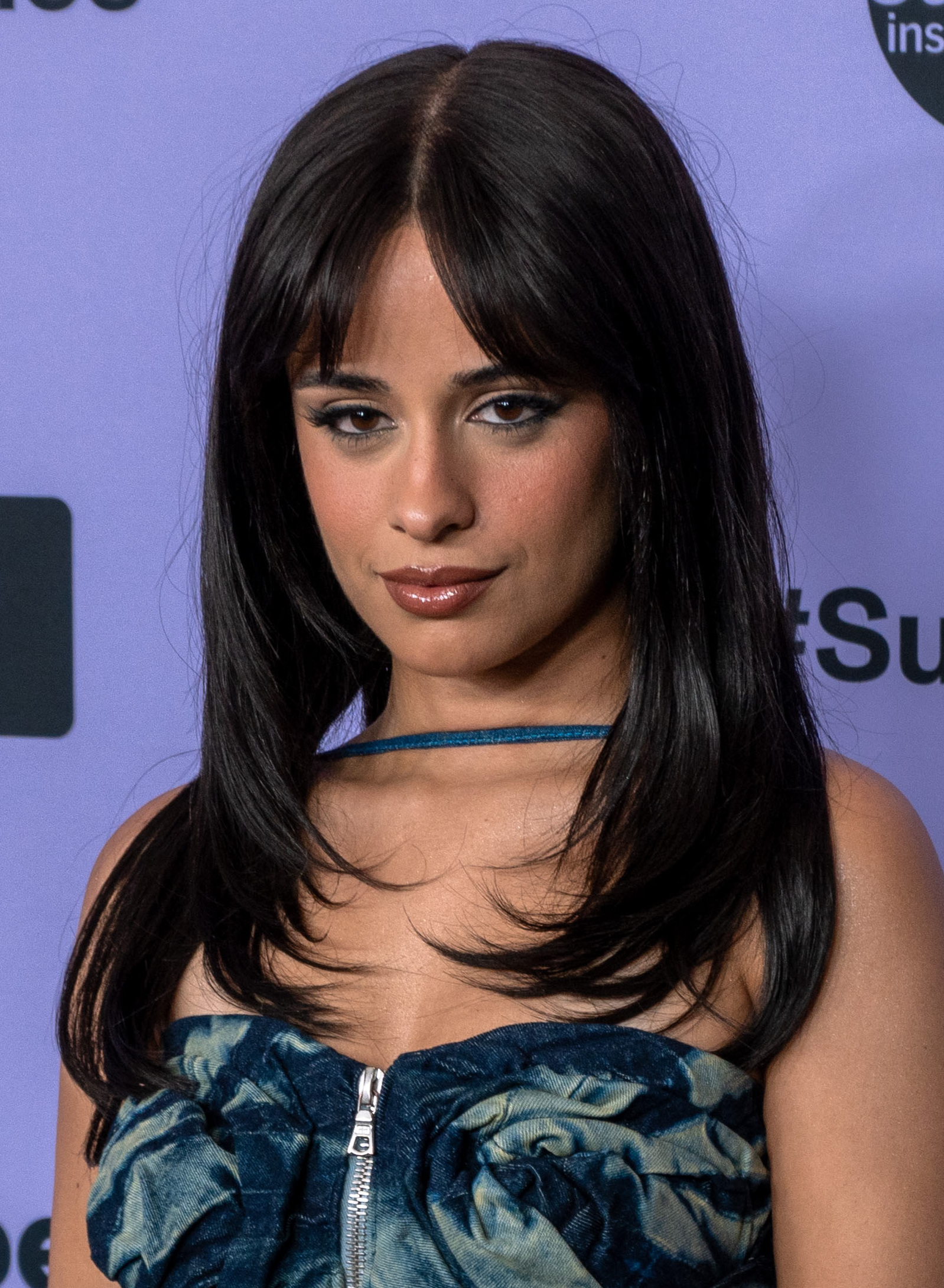
Camila Cabello

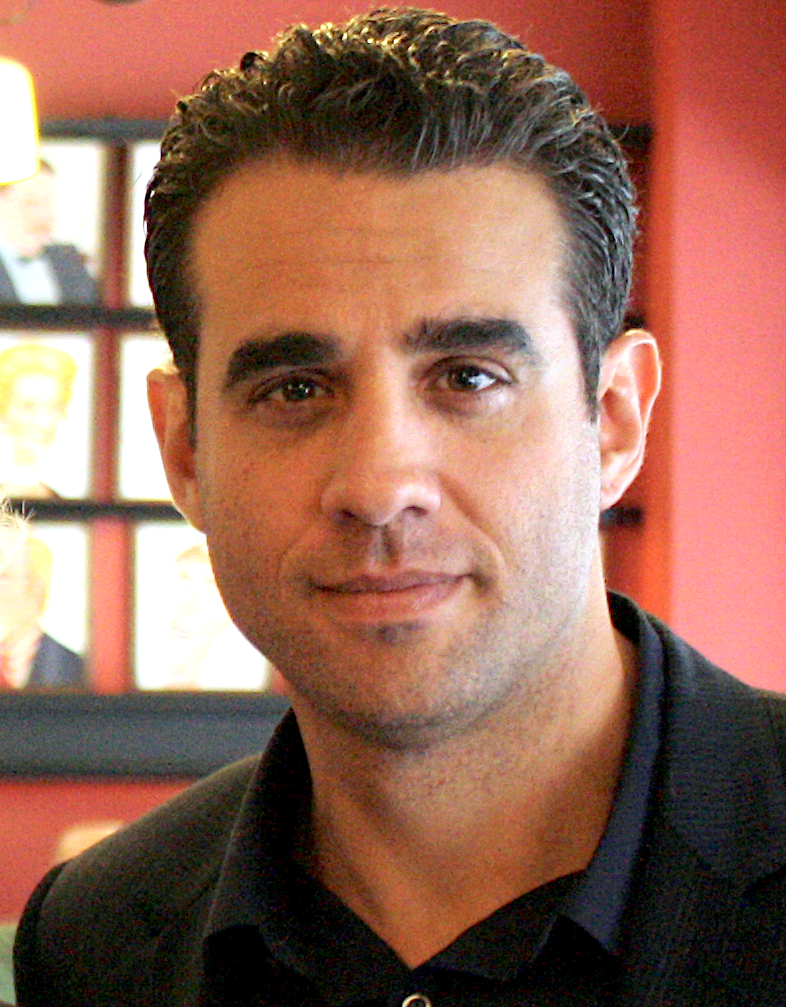
Bobby Cannavale

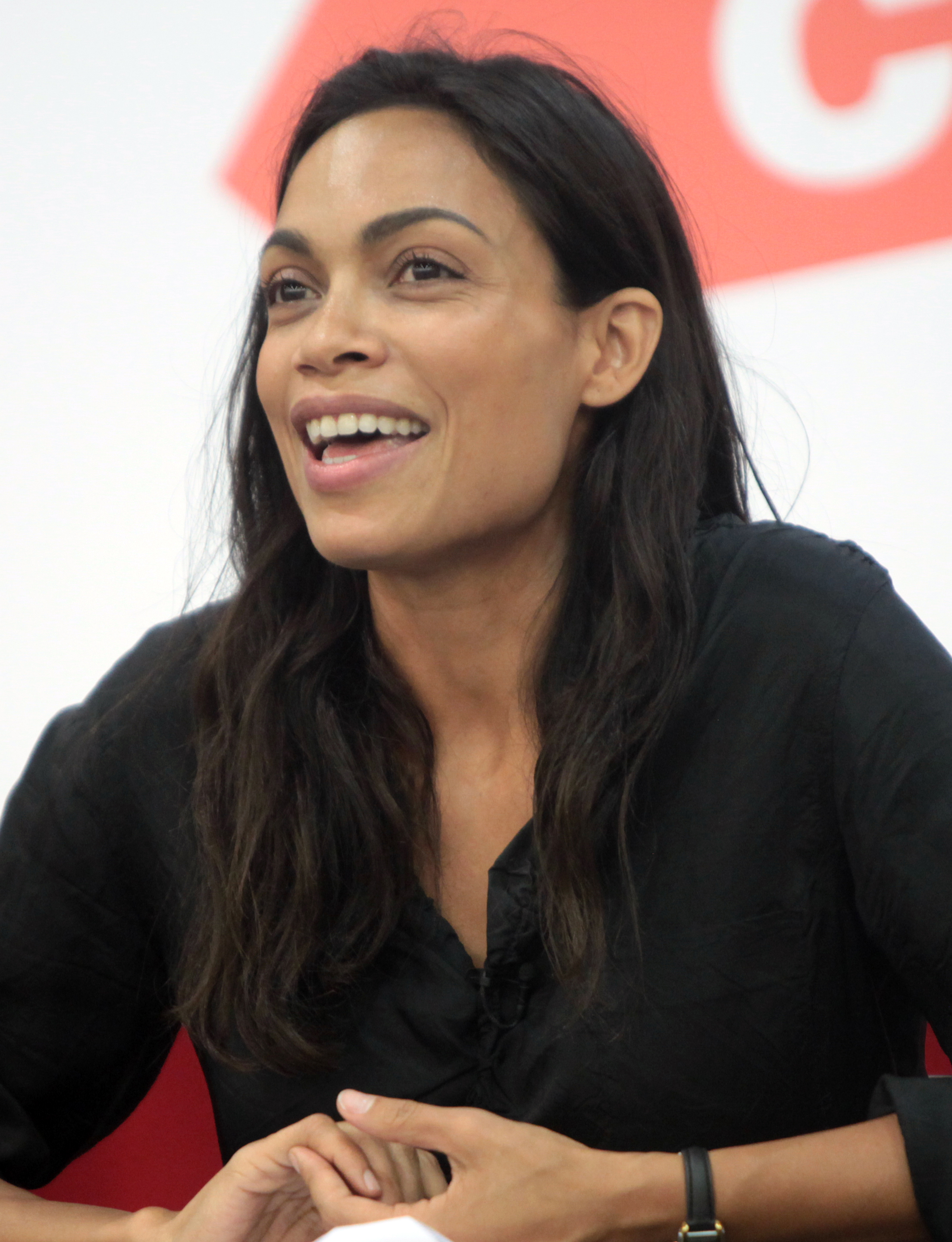
Rosario Dawson

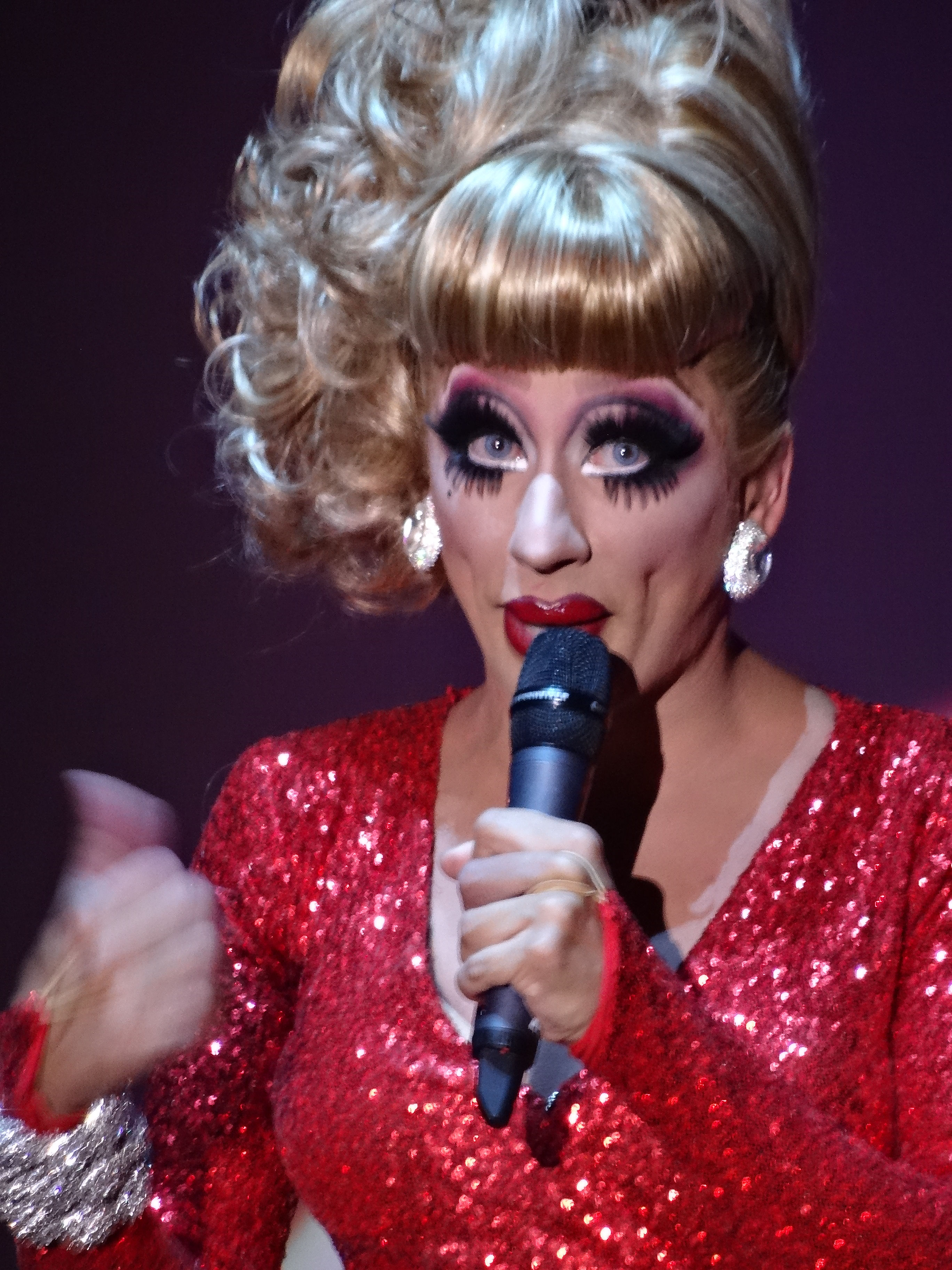
Bianca Del Rio

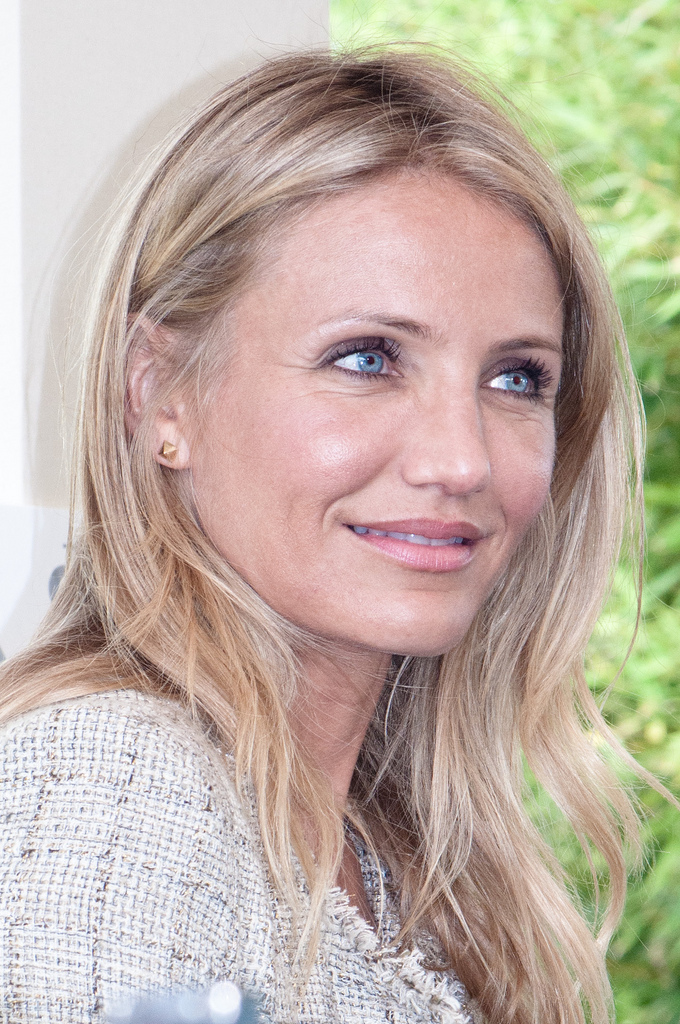
Cameron Diaz

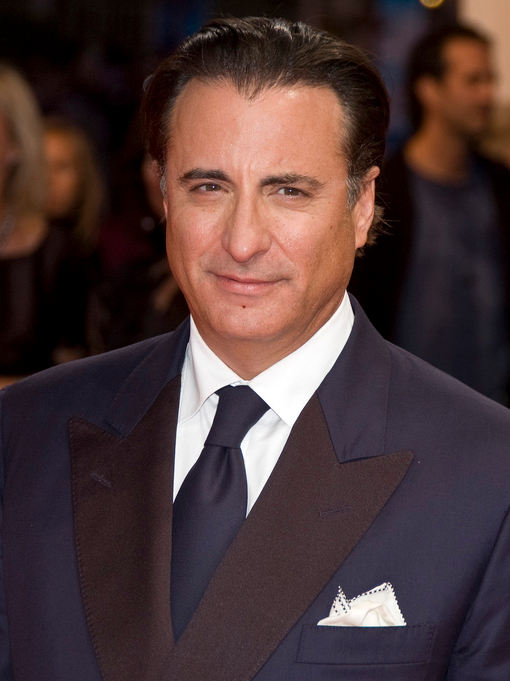
Andy García

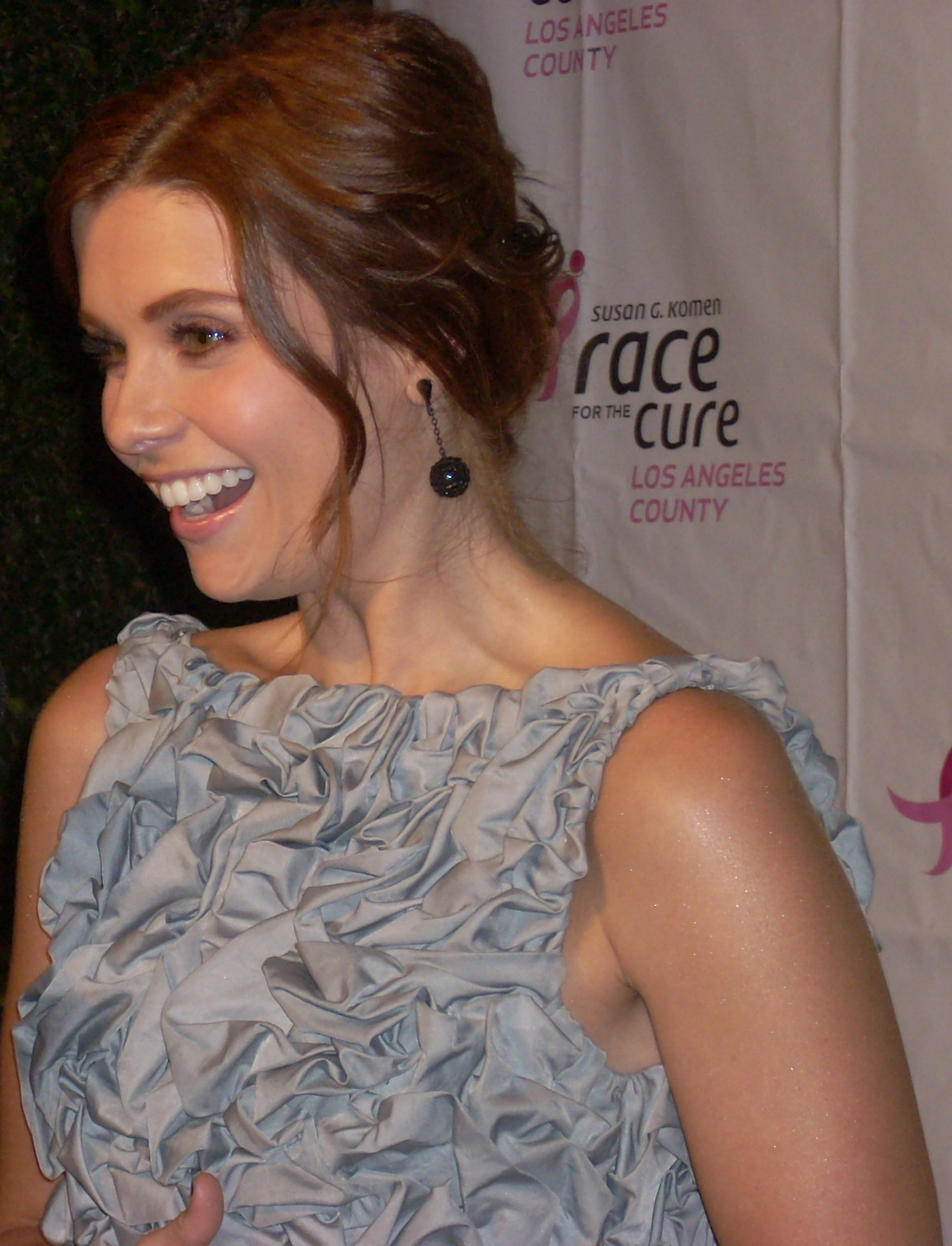
Joanna Garcia

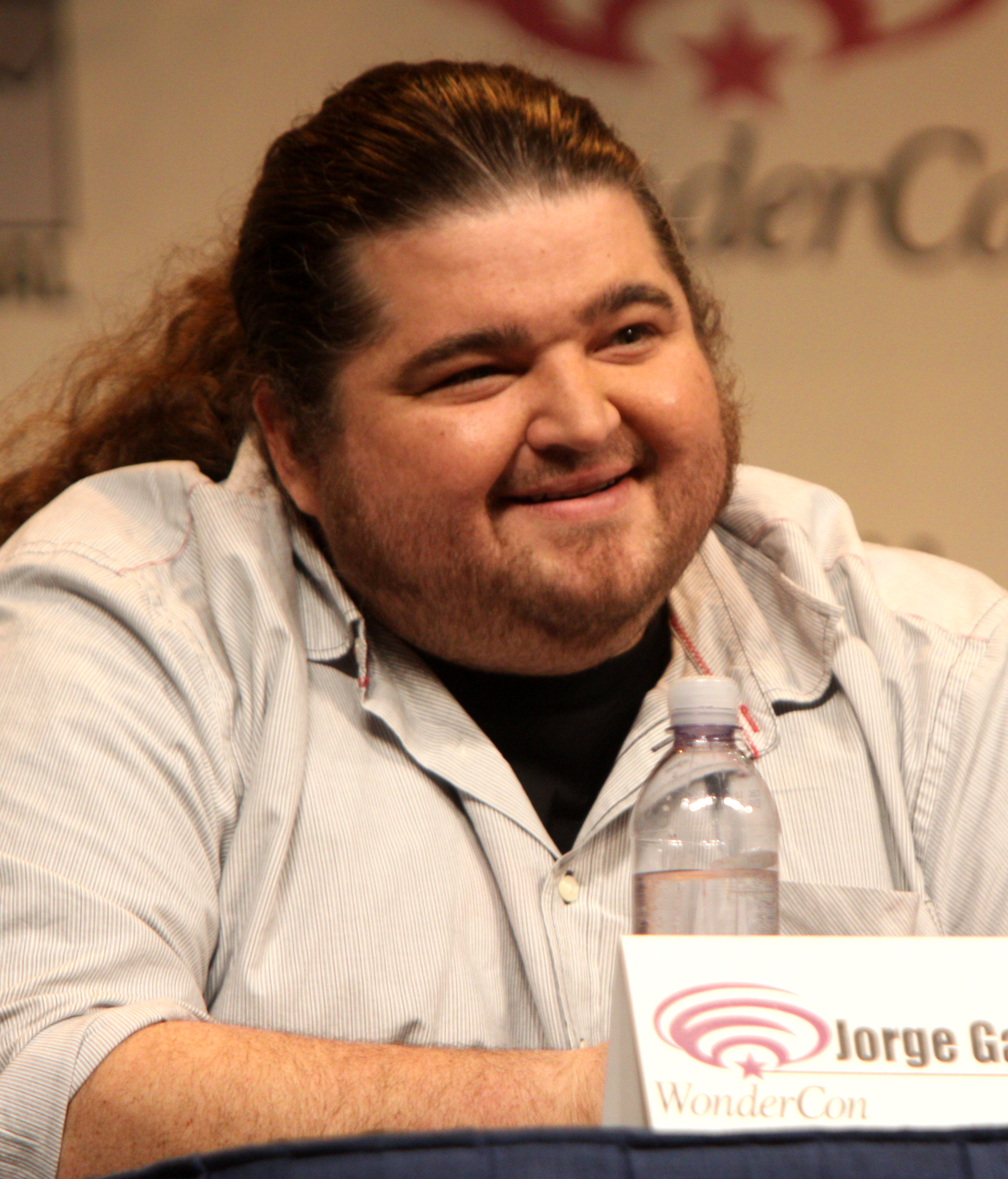
Jorge Garcia

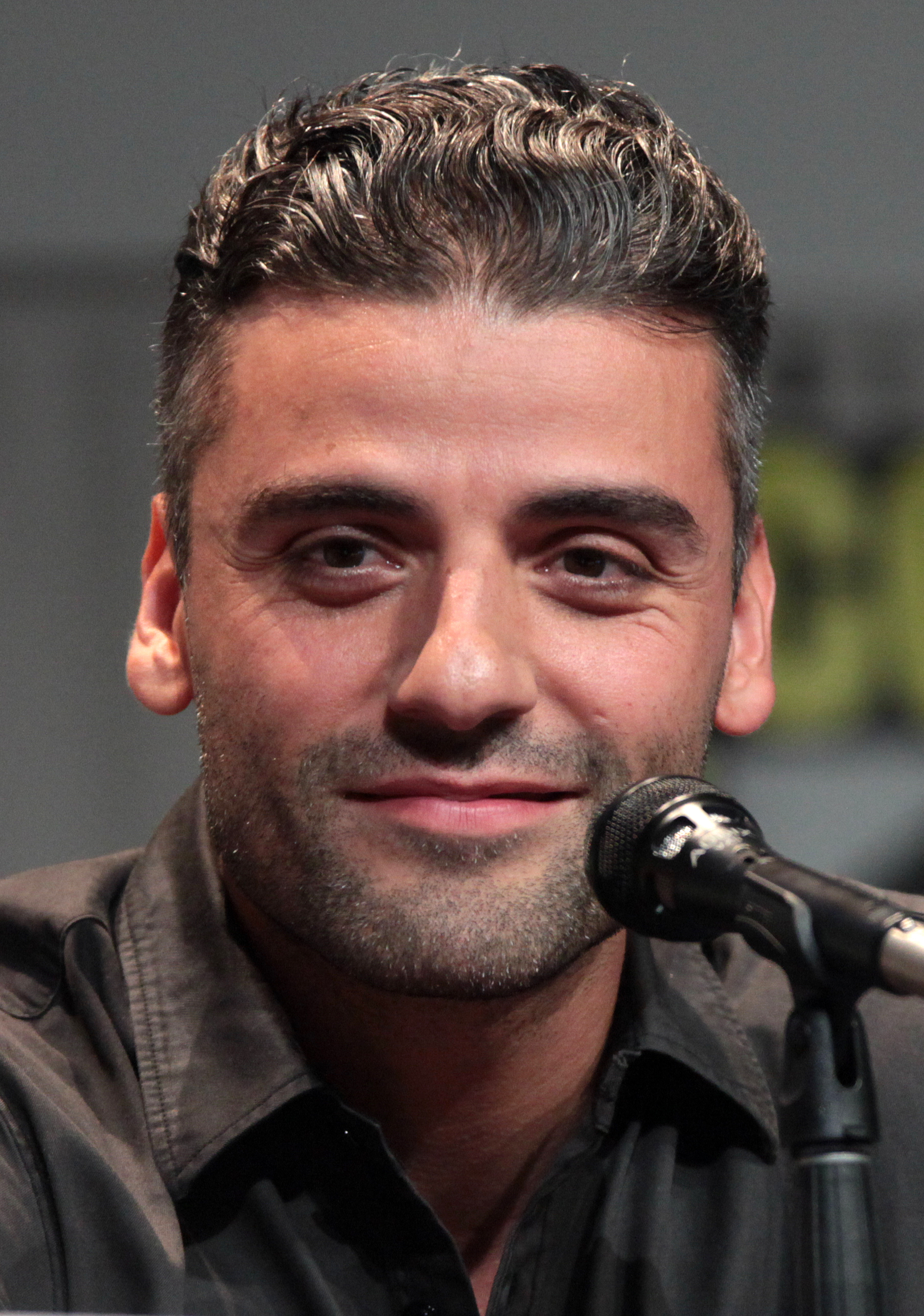
Oscar Isaac

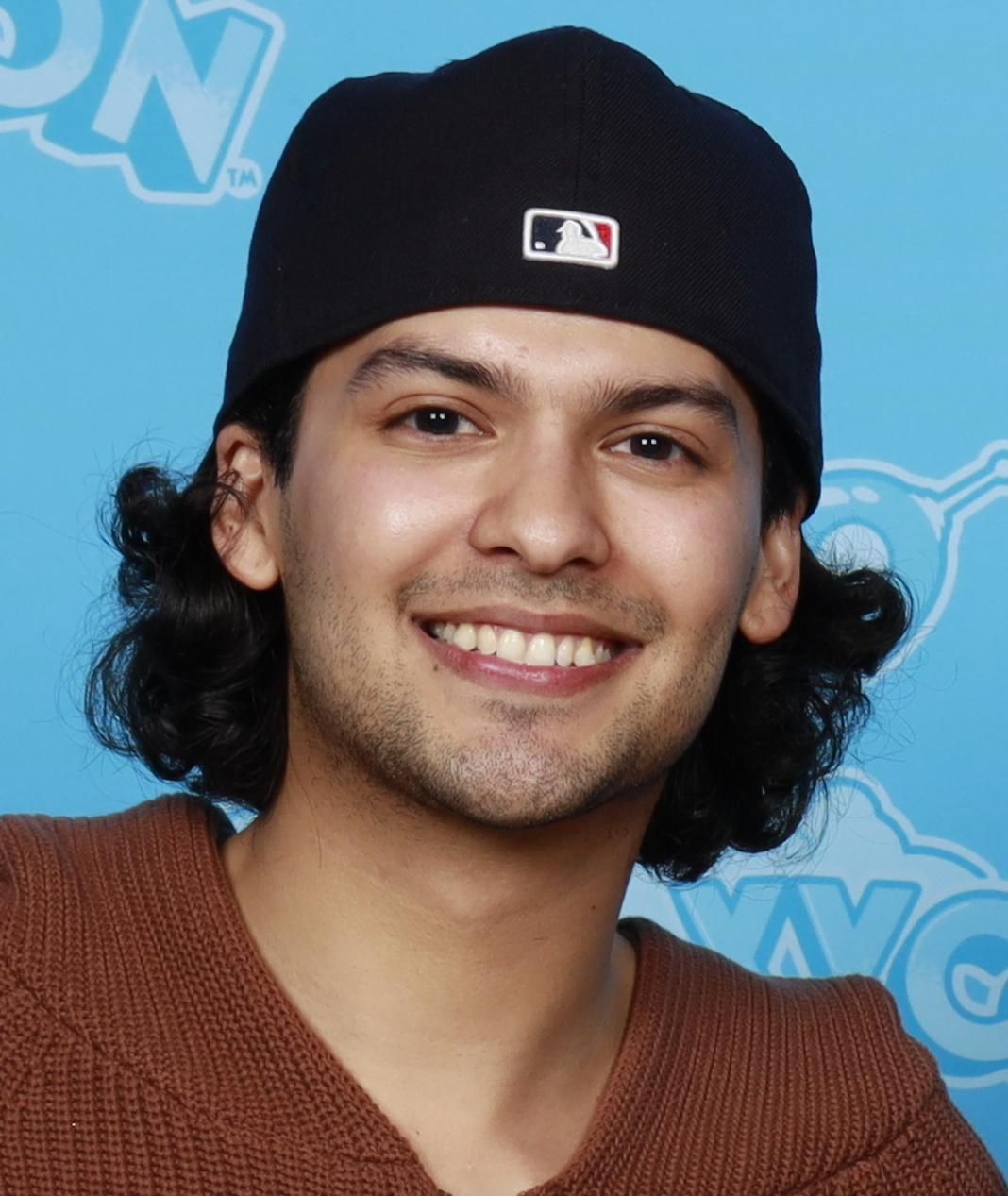
Xolo Maridueña

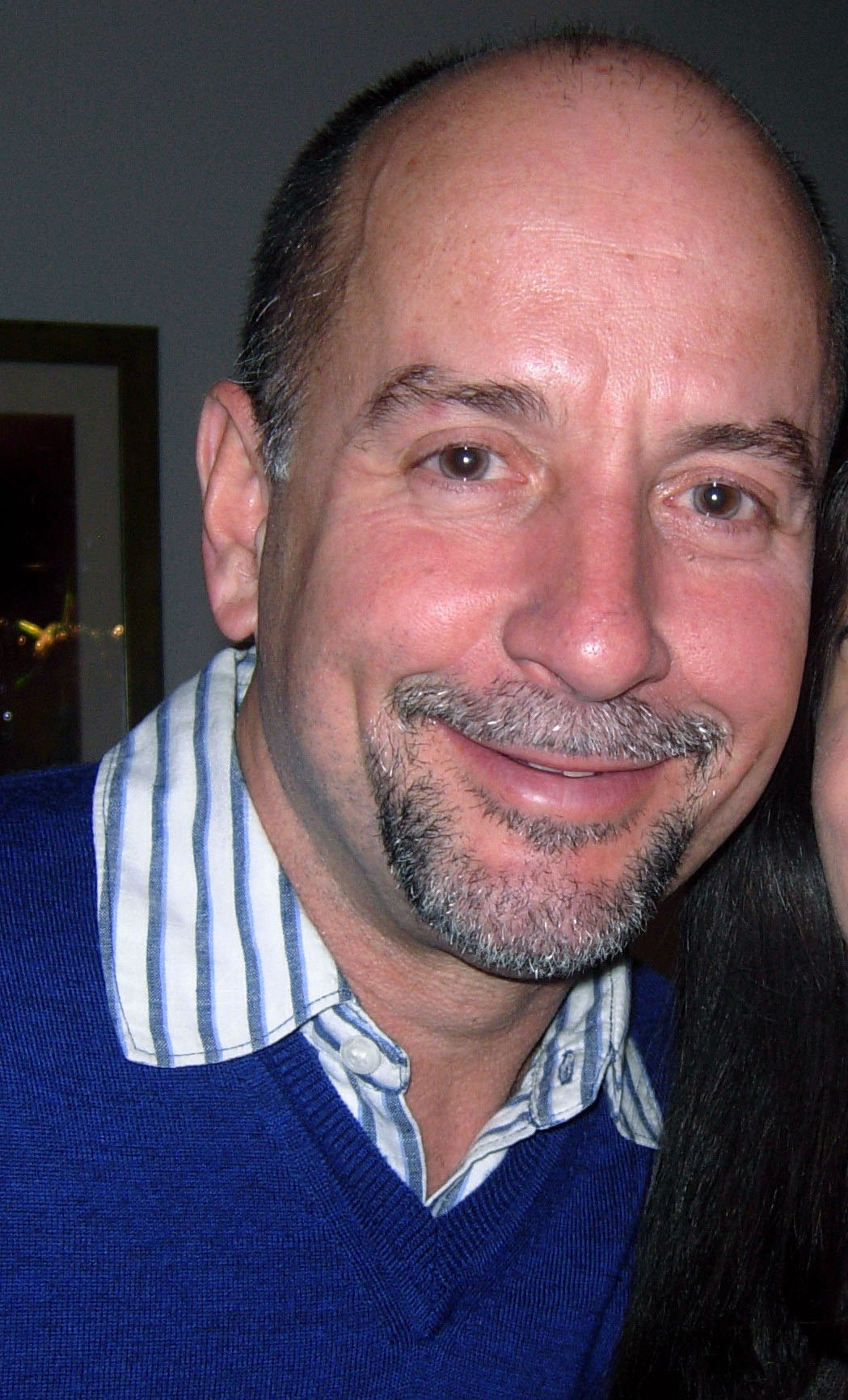
Julio Oscar Mechoso

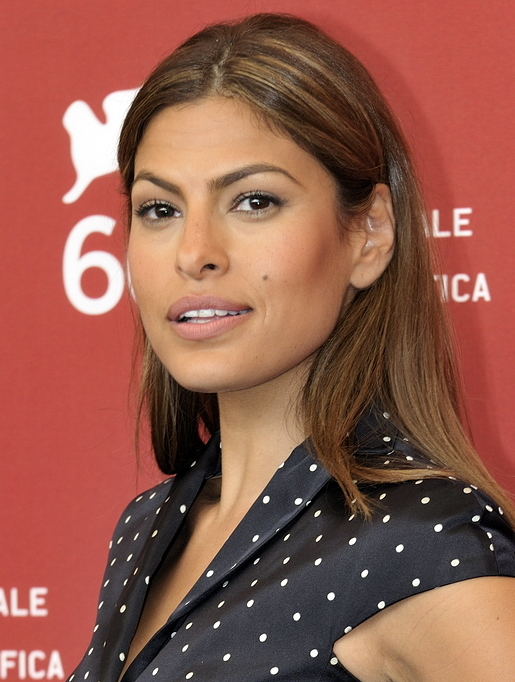
Eva Mendes

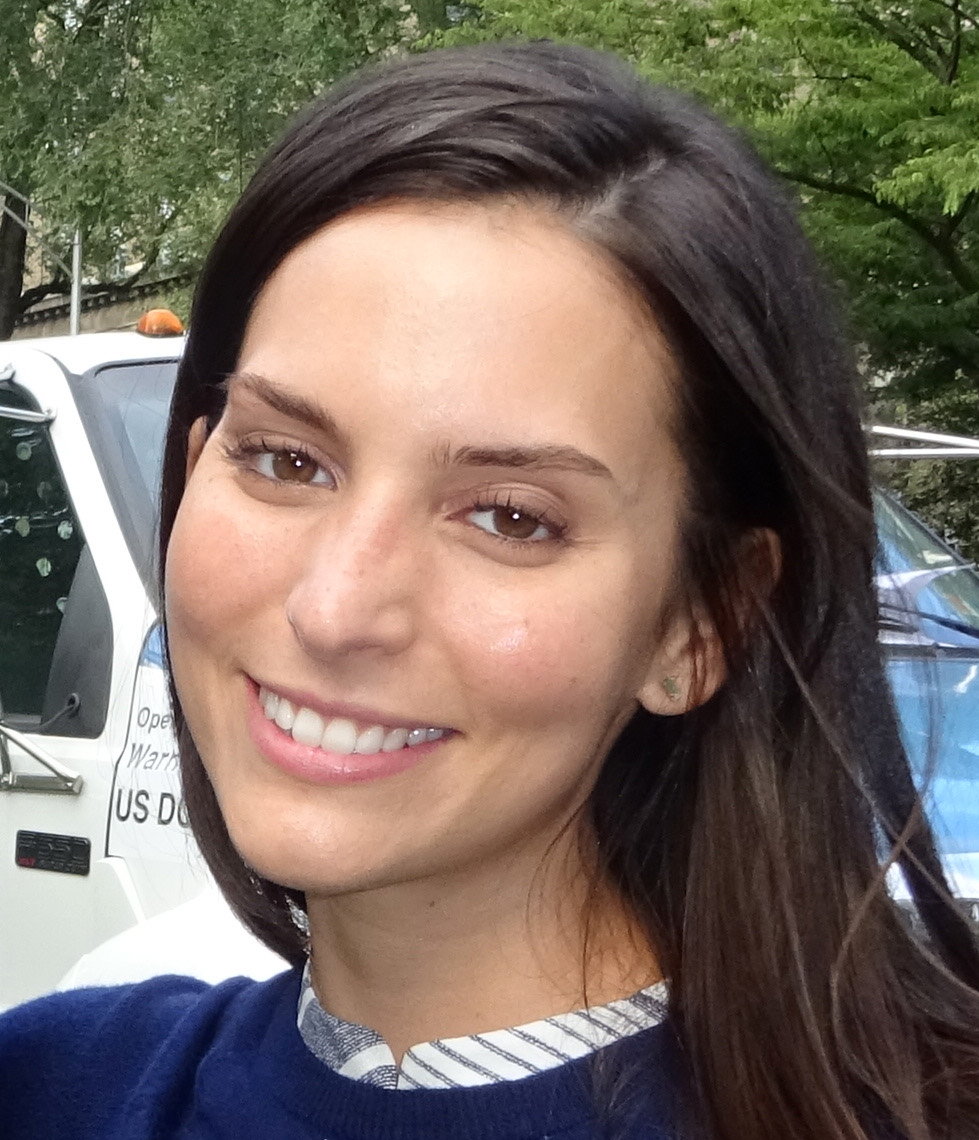
Genesis Rodriguez

=== Actors ===
- Ana de Armas, Cuban-born
- Anabelle Acosta, Cuban-born American actress (Ballers and Quantico)
- Laz Alonso, actor
- Tyler Alvarez, actor (Every Witch Way, American Vandal)
- Odette Annable, actress (Cloverfield); Cuban mother
- Desi Arnaz, actor and musician (I Love Lucy)
- Desi Arnaz Jr., actor and musician
- Lucie Arnaz, actress and singer
- Nelson Ascencio, comedian (MADtv)
- Omar Avila, actor
- Ariana Barouk, TV host, actress, model, and singer; represented Cuba in the seventh edition of the environmentally oriented Miss Earth, international beauty pageant
- Steven Bauer, actor (Scarface, ¿Qué Pasa, USA?, credited as Rocky Echevarría)
- Jason Canela, actor; brother of Jencarlos Canela
- Maria Canals-Barrera, voice actress
- Camila Cabello, singer and composer
- Isabella Castillo, actress and singer
- Jencarlos Canela, actor (Mas sabe el diablo)
- Bobby Cannavale, actor (Third Watch, Will & Grace), Cuban mother
- Irene Cara, actress (Flashdance)
- Nestor Carbonell, actor (Suddenly Susan, Lost, The Dark Knight, The Lost City)
- Matt Cedeño, actor and model
- Eddie Cibrian, actor (Vanished, Invasion)
- Valerie Cruz, actress (Nip/Tuck, The Dresden Files)
- Dar Dash, actor, voice actor, Cuban mother
- Sammy Davis Jr., actor, singer, dancer; mother was of mostly Cuban descent, though often reported as Puerto Rican
- Rosario Dawson, American actress (Rent, Kids), mother of Puerto Rican and Afro-Cuban descent
- Anthony De La Torre, actor
- Kamar de los Reyes, soap opera actor (One Life to Live)
- Bianca Del Rio, comedian, actor, drag performer (Hurricane Bianca)
- Cameron Diaz, actress (father was of Cuban descent)
- Guillermo Díaz, actor (films Half Baked, Party Girl)
- Joey Diaz, actor and comedian
- Emiliano Díez, actor (the George Lopez TV series)
- Majandra Delfino, actress (Roswell)
- Raúl Esparza, actor
- Gloria Estefan, singer and composer
- Lola Falana, actress and singer to an Afro-Cuban father
- Mel Ferrer, actor
- Chrissie Fit, actor
- Amber Frank, actor (The Haunted Hathaways, Spirit Riding Free)
- Daisy Fuentes, model and television personality (MTV's House of Style)
- David Fumero, soap opera actor (One Life to Live)
- Gene Gabriel, actor (Numb3rs, Law & Order: Criminal Intent)
- David Gallagher, actor, 7th Heaven, Cuban mother
- Mo Gallini, actor (2 Fast 2 Furious)
- Melissa Fumero, television actress, Brooklyn Nine-Nine
- Robert Gant, actor (Queer as Folk)
- Andy García, Academy Award-nominated actor (The Godfather Part III, Ocean's Eleven, Ocean's Twelve, The Lost City)
- Joanna García, film and television actress (Reba)
- Jorge Garcia, actor (Lost)
- Jsu Garcia, actor
- Jessica Marie Garcia, American actress of Cuban and Mexican descent (The Middle, Liv and Maddie, On My Block).
- Carlos Gómez, actor
- Marga Gomez, comedian/playwright
- Herizen F. Guardiola, actress
- Adam Irigoyen, actor (Shake It Up)
- Oscar Isaac, actor (Inside Llewyn Davis, Star Wars: The Force Awakens)
- Blake Jenner, American actor and singer; mother is Cuban
- David Lago, actor
- Stefania LaVie Owen (born 1997), American actress to a Cuban mother (Running Wilde, The Carrie Diaries, Sweet Tooth)
- Paul Le Mat, American actor of partial Cuban descent
- William Levy, actor
- Selenis Leyva (born 1972), American actress of Cuban and Dominican descent (Orange Is the New Black, Diary of a Future President).
- Suki Lopez (1990-), actress, dancer, and graphic designer
- Josie Loren, actress
- Faizon Love, actor, born Langston Faizon Santisima
- Xolo Maridueña, actor
- Alicia Machado, actress, Miss Universe 1996
- Natalie Martinez, actress (Sons of Tucson)
- Ana Margarita Martínez-Casado, actress (El Super, ¿Qué Pasa, USA?)
- Julio Oscar Mechoso, actor
- Eva Mendes, actress (Hitch, 2 Fast 2 Furious)
- Olga Merediz, actress and singer
- Alano Miller, actor (Jane the Virgin, Underground, and Loving)
- Christina Milian, singer and actress (Be Cool)
- Tomas Milian, actor
- Natalie Morales, actress (The Middleman)
- Louisa Moritz, Cuban-American actress, real estate holder and former lawyer
- Enrique Murciano, actor (Without a Trace)
- Carlos Navarro, American actor and radio personality
- Oscar Nuñez, actor (The Office)
- Luis Oquendo, actor (film, Guaguasi, ¿Qué Pasa, USA?)
- Elizabeth Peña, actress (Rush Hour)
- Danny Pino, actor (Cold Case)
- Tony Plana, actor (Ugly Betty)
- Carlos Ponce, actor and singer; born in Puerto Rico to Cuban immigrants
- J. R. Ramirez, Cuban-born American actor (Manifest)
- Antonia Rey (1926–2019), Cuban-born American actress
- Armando Riesco, actor (film Garden State)
- Adam Rodríguez, actor (CSI: Miami), of Cuban and Puerto Rican descent
- Genesis Rodriguez, actress (Dona Barbara, Dame Chocolate and Prisionera)
- Mel Rodriguez, actor (Getting On, The Last Man on Earth, On Becoming a God in Central Florida)
- Cesar Romero, actor (Batman (1960s TV series), Ocean's 11, Week-End in Havana)
- Mercedes Ruehl, Academy Award-winning (The Fisher King) and Tony Award-winning actress; mother is of part Cuban descent
- Caitlin Sanchez, actress (Dora the Explorer)
- Marco Sanchez, actor
- Saundra Santiago, actress (Miami Vice, The Sopranos)
- Tessie Santiago, actress (Queen of Swords, Good Morning, Miami)
- Bianca A. Santos, actress (The Fosters)
- Cristina Saralegui, Hispanic talk show host
- Jamie-Lynn Sigler, actress (The Sopranos), mother is of Cuban descent
- Charise Castro Smith, actor
- Georg Stanford Brown, actor (Roots)
- Lela Star, pornographic actress
- Jeremy Suarez (1990) actor, film producer and director (The Bernie Mac Show)
- Bella Thorne, actress Shake It Up; father was of Cuban descent
- Oscar Torre, actor and director (Hangover III, Cane, Ladrón que roba a ladrón)
- Gina Torres, actress (The Matrix sequels, Firefly and Serenity)
- Yul Vazquez, Cuban-born American actor and musician
- Bob Vila, This Old House host
- Jordi Vilasuso, actor (Guiding Light)

=== Cartoonists and animators ===
- Antonio Prohías, creator of Mad Magazine's Spy vs Spy series
- Joe Quesada, comic book editor, writer producer and artist
- Michael Peraza, American animator, art director, conceptual artist and historian of animation, who has worked for The Walt Disney Company, Fox Features, and Warner Brothers. His parents were of Cuban origin.

=== Directors, screenwriters and producers ===
- Ozzie Alfonso, TV director, writer, producer; directed Sesame Street in the 1970s; senior producer, writer, and director of 3-2-1 Contact in the 1980s; freelanced for many clients; adjunct college professor at St. John's University
- Elisa Marina Alvarado, American director of Mexican and Cuban descent
- Rafael Casal (born 1985), American writer, actor, producer, and showrunner. He is of Irish, Spanish, and Cuban descent.
- Migdia Chinea, film director, writer, producer;(When it rains..., The Incredible Hulk)
- Manny Coto, executive producer (24), writer (24, Star Trek: Enterprise)
- René Echevarria, writer (Star Trek: The Next Generation, Star Trek: Deep Space Nine, Medium), co-creator of The 4400
- Andy García, director (Lost City)
- Dany Garcia, film producer
- Silvio Horta, creator and writer (Ugly Betty), writer (Urban Legends, Jake 2.0)
- Leon Ichaso, director/screenwriter (El Super), director (Ali: An American Hero, Crossover Dreams, Piñero, El Cantante)
- Valentina L. Garza, writer and producer for The Simpsons
- Joe Menendez, TV and film director (Ladrón que roba a ladrón, From Dusk till Dawn: The Series, 12 Monkeys, Queen of the South)
- Roberto Orci, executive producer (Star Trek, The Proposal) and writer (Transformers, Eagle Eye, Star Trek)
- George A. Romero, American film director, screenwriter and editor (Night of the Living Dead, Dawn of the Dead), creator of the Living Dead film series; son of a Cuban-born father of Castilian Spanish parentage and a Lithuanian American mother
- Eduardo Sánchez, Cuban-born American director (The Blair Witch Project)
- Amy Serrano, director, cimematographer, and writer (The Sugar Babies), producer of documentary films, poet

=== Fashion ===
- Luis Estevez, Cuban-born American fashion designer and costume designer
- Lazaro Hernandez, fashion designer; born in Miami
- Jorge Manuel, bridal fashion designer
- Narciso Rodriguez, fashion designer
- Yvette Prieto, model for designer Alexander Wang
- Isabel Toledo, former creative director for Anne Klein; designed Michelle Obama's first inauguration day dress

=== Musicians ===
==== Composers and/or bandleaders ====
- Xavier Cugat, bandleader
- Arsenio Rodríguez (1911–1970), Cuban musician, composer and bandleader; born in Cuba, he died in United States, where he lived in the last years of his life
- Lucy Simon, American composer for the theatre and popular songs; known for the musical The Secret Garden; sister of Carly and Joanna Simon
- Ernesto Lecuona, composer, pianist

==== Producers ====
- Desmond Child, American musician, songwriter, and producer; mother is Cuban songwriter Elena Casals
- Scott Herren, music producer; father is Catalan and mother is of Irish and Cuban descent
- Ray Martinez, American musician, music producer, songwriter, artist, disco music icon; Cuban American; Cuban mother and Puerto Rican father
- Rudy Pérez, Cuban composer and music producer
- Tonedeff, American rapper, producer, and singer-songwriter; Cuban mother and Colombian father

==== Musicians and singers by genre ====
===== Rock =====
- Ariel Aparicio, rock musician
- Juan Croucier, rock bassist (Ratt, Dokken, Quiet Riot)
- Frank Ferrer, American rock drummer and session musician (Guns N' Roses)
- Johnny Goudie, rock musician
- Al Jourgensen, frontman of Ministry; born in Havana, Cuba, to Cuban parents, subsequently adopted by a Norwegian-American stepfather.
- Nil Lara, rock musician
- Dave Lombardo, drummer of Slayer
- Courtney Love, actress and frontwoman of rock band Hole; maternal great-grandmother was Cuban immigrant
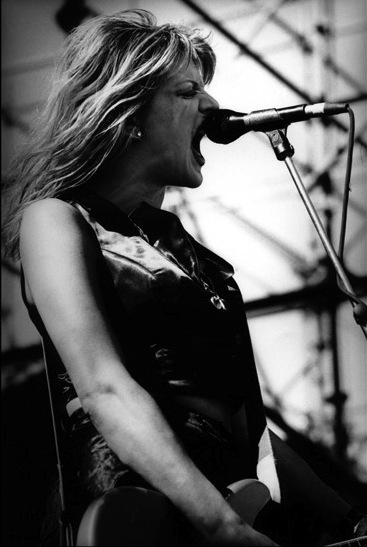
  Courtney Love
- Rudy Sarzo, rock bassist (Quiet Riot, Ozzy Osbourne, Whitesnake, Manic Eden, Dio)
- Tico Torres, drummer of Bon Jovi, singer
- Fernando Perdomo, guitarist featured in Echo In The Canyon

===== Latin American popular music =====
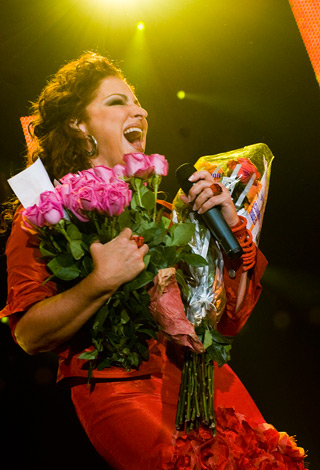
Gloria Estefan

- Camila Cabello, singer-songwriter, former member of the girl group Fifth Harmony
- Gloria Estefan, 7-time Grammy-winning singer
- Emilio Estefan, 19-time Grammy-winning producer
- Franky Gee, member of German Eurodance group Captain Jack; born in Cuba, of African American descent
- Roberto Ledesma, singer

===== Rap and hip-hop =====
- B Real, member of rap group Cypress Hill; born Louis Freese; father is Mexican, mother is Cuban
- Mellow Man Ace, "godfather of Latin hip hop"; born Ulpiano Sergio Reyes; Afro-Cuban
- Olivia, born Olivia Longott; rapper; Cuban, Indian and Jamaican
- P-Star, rapper, actress; born Priscilla Star Diaz
- Pitbull, Cuban American; born in Miami, Florida
- Sen Dog, Cuban rapper, member of Cypress Hill
- Fat Joe, American rapper; parents of Puerto rican and Cuban descent.
- Kat Dahlia, rapper; Cuban and Lebanese
- Cuban Link, Cuban rapper, original member of Terror Squad
- Stitches, rapper; Cuban and Greek
- Pouya, rapper; Cuban and Iranian

===== Percussionists =====
- Francisco Aguabella, Afro-Cuban master percussionist
- Horacio Hernandez ("El Negro"), Grammy-winning drummer and percussionist
- Chano Pozo, Afro-Cuban, Latin Jazz percussionist, conga player
- Walfredo Reyes Jr., percussionist and drum set player; born in Havana to a historically musical Cuban family; former member of Santana; current member of Chicago; expert in jazz, Latin, world music, world fusion, Afro-Cuban, and rock

===== Classical =====
- Manuel Barrueco, classical guitarist
- Jorge Bolet, classical concert pianist specializing in Liszt
- Andrés Cárdenes, violinist
- José Curbelo (1917–2012), Cuban-born American pianist and manager
- Horacio Gutiérrez, prize-winning classical concert pianist
- Zenaida Manfugas, concert pianist
- Joanna Simon, mezzo-soprano; sister of Carly Simon
- René Touzet, composer, pianist
- Aurelio de la Vega, composer, music professor
- Yalil Guerra, composer, guitarist
- Tania León, composer, winner of a Pulitzer Prize for Music (2021)
- Marta Pérez, mezzo-soprano
- Elizabeth Caballero, lyric soprano
- Lisette Oropesa, soprano

===== Jazz =====
- Mario Bauza, trumpeter, saxophonist, composer, arranger, bandleader and Afro-Cuban Jazz pioneer
- Paquito D'Rivera, Grammy-winning saxophonist
- Machito, jazz singer and bandleader
- Fats Navarro (1923–1950), American jazz trumpet player; a pioneer of the bebop style of jazz improvisation in the 1940s; of Cuban-Black-Chinese descent
- Chico O'Farrill, jazz trumpeter; composer, arranger
- Arturo Sandoval, jazz trumpeter and pianist; composer
- Mongo Santamaría, Latin jazz musician Grammy winner
- Bebo Valdés, musician, composer

===== Pop, R&B, Folk, country and other music genre =====
- Albita, Grammy-winning singer
- Daniela Avanzini – singer, dancer, and member of girl group Katseye
- Giselle Bellas, singer-songwriter
- Angela Bofill, American R&B and jazz singer and songwriter of Cuban and Puerto Rican descent
- Camila Cabello, singer, born in Havana, Cuba
- Nini Camps, Cuban-American folk rock singer-songwriter
- Irene Cara, Oscar and Grammy-winning singer (Flashdance), actress (Fame); born in the Bronx, New York; mother was American of Cuban descent
- Willy Chirino, singer
- Sabrina Claudio, singer
- Isabel LaRosa, singer
- Erick Brian Colon, born in Havana, Cuba; member of CNCO
- Celia Cruz, multiple Grammy-winning singer
- The DeCastro Sisters, singing group
- Addys D'Mercedes, singer
- Emily Estefan, singer-songwriter, musician
- Lola Falana, singer, actress and dancer
- Olga Guillot, singer
- Arawak Jah, international Cuban reggae star, member and founder of the reggae group Arawak Jah in Orlando, Florida
- Lauren Jauregui, Cuban-American singer, member of Fifth Harmony
- Roberto Ledesma, singer
- Lissette, singer, actress; wife of Willy Chirino; daughter of Olga y Tony
- La Lupe, singer and gay icon
- Raúl Malo, lead singer of American country music band The Mavericks
- Martika, Grammy-nominated singer/actress (film Annie; television series Kids Incorporated)
- AJ McLean, member of the Backstreet Boys; of Cuban and German ancestry on his mother's side
- Syesha Mercado, singer
- Roger Miret, singer for Agnostic Front
- Jorge Moreno, Grammy award-winning singer, writer and TV producer
- JD Natasha, Latin pop musician
- Nayer, American singer of Cuban parents
- Ashley Ruiz, singer; former member of Boy Band Menudo. He is part Spaniard, Cuban and Irish.
- Rey Ruiz, singer
- Jon Secada, two-time Grammy-winning singer
- Ponciano Seoane, pop singer and contestant from NBC's The Voice season 11
- Carly Simon, singer-songwriter, musician, and children's author; mother, Andrea Louise Simon, was of German, French, and Afro-Cuban descent
- Malu Trevejo, singer, Instagram star
- Mayra Verónica, singer, model, television personality
- Voltaire, dark cabaret musician; born Aurelio Voltaire Hernández

=== Reality television contestants ===
- Jose "Pepi" Diaz, contestant on season 5 of The Apprentice
- Alexia Echevarria, cast member on The Real Housewives Of Miami
- Marlon Fernández, winner of Objetivo Fama (third season)
- Janette Manrara, finalist, So You Think You Can Dance, Season 5
- Jeanine Mason, winner of Season 5 of So You Think You Can Dance and actress
- Ashley Massaro, Survivor: China contestant, WWE wrestler, Playboy model
- Syesha Mercado, American Idol contestant
- Chris Núñez, artist and reality television personality (Miami Ink)
- Melissa Padrón, featured on The Real World: Miami
- Veronica Portillo, Playboy model and Road Rules contestant
- Peter Weber, featured as The Bachelor and as a contestant on The Bachelorette
- Pedro Zamora, AIDS activist, featured on The Real World: San Francisco

=== Writers ===
- Alex Abella, mystery/crime novelist, non-fiction writer, and journalist
- Mercedes de Acosta, poet, playwright
- Reynaldo Arenas, poet, author
- Joaquín Badajoz, poet, author, essayist, member of the North American Academy of the Spanish Language
- Richard Blanco, Spanish-born poet
- Antonio Berre, journalist, radio journalist, dissident
- Rosa Berre, journalist, organizer, dissident
- Rafael Campo, Cuban-born American poet
- Daína Chaviano, novelist, poet, and award-winning novelist of Azorín Prize for Best Novel (Spain), among other international awards.
- Nilo Cruz, playwright, first Latino to win the Pulitzer Prize for Drama
- Silvia Curbelo, poet
- Carmen Agra Deedy, children's books author
- Carlos Eire, writer, won the 2003 National Book Award in Nonfiction
- Frank Fernández, anarchist, author of exile-related themes
- Roberto G. Fernández, novelist
- María Irene Fornés, playwright
- Paula Fox, author, winner of Hans Christian Andersen Medal, biological grandmother of musician Courtney Love
- Cristina García, novelist
- Carolina Garcia-Aguilera, mystery novelist and descendant of Cuban independence patriot Francisco Vicente Aguilera
- Lucia M. Gonzalez, children's writer
- Jorge Enrique González Pacheco www.jorgeenrique.net, poet, cultural entrepreneur, founder of the Seattle Latino Film Festival, a 501(c)(3) non profit organization
- Lillian Guerra, Professor of History at University of Florida and widely published researcher and author
- Oscar Hijuelos, first Hispanic to win the Pulitzer Prize for fiction
- Robert Lima, author of twenty-seven books, poet, literary critic, biographer, editor, translator, bibliographer
- Rosa Lowinger, author of Tropicana Nights: the Life and Times of the Legendary Cuban Nightclub
- Ana Menéndez, author (books In Cuba I Was a German Shepherd and Loving Che)
- Orlando Ricardo Menes, poet, short story writer, translator, anthologist
- Anaïs Nin, author
- Achy Obejas, novelist
- Ricardo Pau-Llosa, poet, art critic
- Gustavo Pérez Firmat, poet, writer, and scholar
- Carlos Pintado, author, playwright and award-winning poet of Sant Jordi International Prize for Poetry
- Fara Rey, journalist, dissident
- Jorge Reyes, memoirist, short-story writer, poet, children's books
- Enrique Ros, writer, scholar, activist, and father of Ileana Ros-Lehtinen
- Antonio Sacre, children's books, playwright
- Cecilia Samartin, novelist (books Broken Paradise, Tarnished Beauty, Vigil)
- Luis Senarens, proto-science fiction author of the late 1800s.
- Virgil Suárez, novelist
- Piri Thomas, author (memoir Down These Mean Streets)
- Alisa Valdes-Rodriguez, writer (The Dirty Girls Social Club)
- Armando Valladares, writer (Against All Hope: A Memoir of Life in Castro's Gulag)

=== Others ===
- Judge Alex Ferrer
- Judge Marilyn Milian
- Lyle and Erik Menendez

== Journalists ==
- Jim Acosta, CNN's Senior White House Correspondent
- Jessica Aguirre, anchor for KNTV NBC Bay Area News, San Francisco, California
- Achy Obejas, novelist, journalist
- Manny Alvarez, medical correspondent for Fox News Channel
- Cathy Areu, founder of Catalina magazine
- Liz Balmaseda, columnist, Miami Herald
- Bárbara Bermudo, anchor, Primer Impacto
- Michelle Caruso-Cabrera, business news general assignment reporter for CNBC television
- Myrka Dellanos, former anchor, Primer Impacto
- GiGi Diaz, sports reporter, Pompano Park, and journalist in Miami
- Lili Estefan, host for Univision
- Suzy Exposito, Los Angeles Times music reporter
- Lourdes Garcia-Navarro, New York Times podcast host and former journalist for National Public Radio
- Max Gomez, medical correspondent for WCBS-TV in New York City
- Pedro Gomez, ESPN reporter
- Ambrose E. Gonzales, co-founder of The State newspaper in South Carolina and author of several books in Gullah language
- Narciso Gener Gonzales, co-founder of The State newspaper in South Carolina
- Maria Laria, journalist and presenter
- Dan Le Batard, sportswriter for The Miami Herald
- Tom Llamas, correspondent for ABC News
- Antonio Mora, host on Al Jazeera America
- Belkys Nerey, anchor WSVN, Fox in Miami
- Jackie Nespral, anchor WTVJ, NBC in Miami
- Soledad O'Brien, Al Jazeera America correspondent, independent producer
- Mirta Ojito, Pulitzer Prize winner
- Rafael Pineda, veteran TV personality, former anchor WXTV in New York City
- Eliott Rodriguez, anchor for CBS Miami.
- Maggie Rodriguez, co-anchor of CBS's The Early Show
- Rick Sanchez, anchor
- Kristen Millares Young, investigative journalist

== Government ==
=== United States ambassadors ===
- Eduardo Aguirre, former United States Ambassador to Spain and Andorra
- Paul L. Cejas, former United States Ambassador to Belgium
- Miguel H. Díaz, United States Ambassador to Holy See
- Lino Gutierrez, former United States Ambassador to Argentina
- Hugo Llorens, United States Ambassador to Honduras
- Carlos Pascual, former United States Ambassador to Mexico
- Otto Reich, former United States Ambassador to Venezuela
- Mauricio Solaún, former United States Ambassador to Nicaragua

=== United States Cabinet members ===
- Carlos Gutierrez, former United States Secretary of Commerce (Republican)
- Mel Martinez, former United States Secretary of Housing and Urban Development (Republican)
- Alexander Acosta, former United States Secretary of Labor (Republican)
- Alejandro Mayorkas, former United States Secretary of Homeland Security (Democrat)
- Marco Rubio, United States Secretary of State (Republican)

=== United States House of Representatives ===
- Carlos Curbelo, Republican former member of the United States House of Representatives, representing Florida's 26th district
- Lincoln Díaz-Balart, Republican former member of the United States House of Representatives, representing Florida's 21st district
- Mario Díaz-Balart, Republican member of the United States House of Representatives, representing Florida's 25th district
- Joe Garcia, former Democratic member of the United States House of Representatives, representing Florida's 26th district
- Thomas Gill, Democratic former member of the United States House of Representatives, representing Hawaii's at-large district
- Carlos A. Giménez, Republican member of the United States House of Representatives, representing Florida's 26th congressional district, former mayor of Miami-Dade County (2011–2020)
- Thomas Ponce Gill, Congressman from Hawaii in the early 1960s (his paternal grandmother was Cuban)
- Anthony Gonzalez, Republican former member of the United States House of Representatives for Ohio's 16th District (2019–2023)
- Joseph Marion Hernández, first Hispanic elected to the United States Congress
- Nicole Malliotakis, Republican member of the United States House of Representatives, representing New York's 11th district
- Rob Menendez, Democratic member of the United States House of Representatives, representing New Jersey's 8th district
- Alex Mooney, Republican former member of the United States House of Representatives, representing West Virginia's 2nd district
- David Rivera, Republican former member of the United States House of Representatives, representing Florida's 25th district
- Ileana Ros-Lehtinen, Republican former member of the United States House of Representatives, representing Florida's 18th district
- Maria Elvira Salazar, Republican member of the United States House of Representative for Florida's 27th congressional district; former television news anchor
- Albio Sires, Democratic former member of the United States House of Representatives, representing New Jersey's 13th district

=== 2008 Congressional candidates ===
- Raul L. Martinez, Democratic candidate for Florida's 21st district

=== United States Senate ===
- Ted Cruz, United States senator (R–Texas)
- Mel Martinez, former United States senator (R-Florida)
- Bob Menendez, former United States senator (D–New Jersey), and chairman of the Senate Foreign Relations Committee; former representative for New Jersey's 13th district
- Marco Rubio, former United States senator and current US Secretary of State (R-Florida)

=== Federal government ===
- Al Cardenas, Washington, D.C. lobbyist
- Alex Castellanos, Republican media consultant; senior advisor to 2008 Presidential Candidate Mitt Romney
- Carlos Del Toro, 78th Secretary of the Navy; retired Naval Officer and former business owner
- Nils J. Diaz, former chairman of the Nuclear Regulatory Commission
- Cari M. Dominguez, Chair of the United States Equal Employment Opportunity Commission
- Emilio T. Gonzalez, Ph.D., director of United States Citizenship and Immigration Services (USCIS)
- Eliot A. Jardines, first Assistant Deputy Director of National Intelligence for Open Source
- Elsa A. Murano, former Undersecretary for Food Safety United States Department of Agriculture
- Steve Pieczenik, former deputy assistant secretary of state
- Otto Reich, former Assistant Secretary of State for Western Hemisphere Affairs
- Mauricio J. Tamargo, 14th chairman of the Foreign Claims Settlement Commission

=== Local government ===
- Carlos Alvarez, former mayor of Miami-Dade County
- Angelo Castillo, first Hispanic mayor of Pembroke Pines, Florida
- Joe Carollo, Miami City Commissioner, former mayor of Miami
- Manny Diaz, mayor of Miami
- Alina Garcia, Miami-Dade County Supervisor of Elections
- George Gascón, district attorney of Los Angeles County; former district attorney of San Francisco County
- Carlos A. Giménez, 7th Mayor of Miami-Dade County
- Rosario Kennedy, former commissioner and vice-mayor of Miami
- Raul L. Martinez, former mayor of Hialeah
- Carlos Mayans, former mayor of Wichita, Kansas
- Gilda Oliveros, first Cuban-born woman mayor in the United States
- Alex Penelas, former mayor (D–FL), Miami-Dade County, Florida
- Tomas Regalado, former mayor of Miami
- Julio Robaina, former mayor of City of Hialeah
- Evelyn Sanguinetti, former member of the Wheaton, Illinois City Council
- Francis Suarez, mayor of Miami
- Xavier Suarez, former mayor of Miami
- Silverio Vega, former mayor of West New York, New Jersey
- Bill Vidal, former mayor of Denver, Colorado; born in Camagüey, Cuba

=== State government ===
- Zulima Farber, former Attorney General of New Jersey
- Anitere Flores, Florida State Senator and former Florida State Representative, first Republican Hispanic woman to serve in both the Florida House and Senate since 1986
- Alina Garcia, former Florida State Representative
- Thomas Gill, 4th Lieutenant Governor of Hawaii, former member of the U.S. House of Representatives
- Carlos Lopez-Cantera, 19th Lieutenant Governor of Florida, former Majority Leader of the Florida House of Representatives
- Bob Martinez, former governor of Florida, first Cuban-American governor in United States history
- Robert E. Martinez, 8th Virginia Secretary of Transportation and deputy administrator of the United States Maritime Administration
- Joseph Miró, Delaware state representative, president National Hispanic Caucus of State Legislators
- Alex X. Mooney, member of the Maryland state senate representing District 3
- Jeanette Nuñez, 20th Lieutenant Governor of Florida, former Speaker pro tempore of the Florida House of Representatives
- Vincent Prieto, New Jersey State Assemblyman, 32nd District
- Marco Rubio, U.S. senator from Florida, and former Speaker of the Florida House of Representatives
- Katherine Fernandez Rundle, State Attorney for Miami-Dade County
- Evelyn Sanguinetti, 47th Lieutenant Governor of Illinois
- Yvanna Cancela, state senator representing Nevada's 10th District
- Mo Denis, state senator representing Nevada's 2nd District
- Jason Miyares, member of the Virginia House of Delegates' 82nd district and Attorney General of Virginia
- Wes Moore, 63rd governor of Maryland

=== U.S. Commonwealth government ===
- Roberto Arango, Puerto Rico senator

=== Judiciary ===
- Armando Omar Bonilla, former Department of Justice official and nominee to the United States Court of Federal Claims
- Barbara Lagoa, Justice on the Florida Supreme Court
- Cecilia Altonaga, United States District Court Judge
- Danny Boggs, Chief judge of the United States Court of Appeals for the Sixth Circuit in Cincinnati
- Raoul G. Cantero, III, first Hispanic justice on the Florida Supreme Court
- Adalberto Jordan, United States District Court Judge
- Jorge Labarga, Justice of the Florida Supreme Court, former Chief Justice of the Florida Supreme Court
- Jose L. Linares, United States District Court Judge of United States District Court for the District of New Jersey in Newark, New Jersey
- Ariel A. Rodriguez, judge of New Jersey Appellate Division, acting Justice of the New Jersey Supreme Court
- Joseph H. Rodriguez, United States District Court Judge of the United States District Court for the District of New Jersey in Camden, New Jersey
- Eduardo Robreno, United States District Court Judge of the United States District Court for the Eastern District of Pennsylvania in Philadelphia
- Esther Salas, United States District Court Judge of United States District Court for the District of New Jersey in Newark, New Jersey
- Mauricio J. Tamargo, Chairman of the Foreign Claims Settlement Commission

== United States Armed Forces ==
- Adolfo Fernández Cavada, captain in the Union Army during the American Civil War who later served as Commander-in-Chief of the Cinco Villas during Cuba's Ten Year War
- Federico Fernández Cavada, colonel in the Union Army during the American Civil War and later Commander-in-Chief of all the Cuban forces during Cuba's Ten Year War
- Mercedes O. Cubria, lieutenant colonel in the U.S. Army; first Cuban-born female officer in the US Army
- Julius Peter Garesché, lieutenant colonel in the Union Army who served as Chief of Staff, with the rank of Lieutenant Colonel to Maj. Gen. William S. Rosecrans
- Ambrosio José Gonzales, colonel in the Confederate Army during the American Civil War
- Erneido Oliva, major general; former deputy commander of the D.C. National Guard
- Félix Rodríguez, U.S. Army helicopter pilot, former CIA officer known for his involvement in the Bay of Pigs Invasion and his involvement in the capture and interrogation of Che Guevara
- Lola Sánchez, Confederate spy during the American Civil War; played an instrumental role in the Confederate victory in the Battle of Horse Landing
- José Agustín Quintero, Cuban-born Confederate diplomat to Mexico, based in Monterrey
- Loreta Janeta Velazquez (1842 – c. 1902), aka Lieutenant Harry Buford, Cuban-born woman who claimed that she masqueraded as a male Confederate soldier during the American Civil War

== World leaders ==
- Consuelo Montagu, Duchess of Manchester
- Maria Teresa, Grand Duchess of Luxembourg

== Science and technology ==
- Aida de Acosta, first female to fly a powered aircraft
- Aristides Agramonte, physician, pathologist and bacteriologist
- Luis Walter Alvarez, Nobel Prize-winning experimental physicist (his paternal grandfather immigrated from Spain to Cuba and then to the United States)
- Serena M. Auñón, American physician, engineer, and NASA astronaut
- Agustin Walfredo Castellanos, physician
- Nils J. Diaz, former chairman of the U.S. Nuclear Regulatory Commission
- Luis Echegoyen, famous Cuban-born chemist
- Isabel Pérez Farfante, carcinologist
- Carlos Juan Finlay (1833–1915), Cuban physician and scientist recognized as a pioneer in yellow fever research
- Maria Oliva-Hemker, Cuban-born American paediatrician
- Tony Silva, Cuban-born American aviculturist and ornithologist who has written many books and articles about parrots.
- Albert Siu, internist and geriatrician at Mount Sinai Medical Center in New York City

== Visual arts ==
- Mercedes de Acosta, socialite, author, best known for her affairs with Greta Garbo and Marlene Dietrich
- Rita de Acosta Lydig, socialite
- Jose Ramon Diaz Alejandro, painter
- Edel Alvarez Galban, painter and medical doctor
- Henry Ballate, visual artist
- Jose Bedia, visual artist
- Cundo Bermúdez, painter
- Adriano Buergo, painter
- José Bernal, artist
- Juana Borrero
- Fernando Bujones, ballet dancer
- Consuelo Castañeda, visual artist
- Ana Albertina Delgado Álvarez, visual artist
- Antonia Eiriz, painter
- George Gomez, industrial designer, designer of video games, toys and pinball machines
- Diana Guerrero-Maciá, visual artist
- F. Lennox Campello, contemporary visual artist, art critic, writer
- Manuel Carbonell (1918–2011), one of the last of the Cuban master sculptors; lived and died in Florida
- Jose Manuel Carreño, award-winning ballet dancer, American Ballet Theatre
- Humberto Castro, painter
- Migdia Chinea, awarded film director/screenwriter/producer; member of the TV Academy of Arts and Sciences.
- Rafael Consuegra, sculptor and painter
- Emilio Cruz (1938–2004), American artist of African and Cuban descent; his work is held in several major museums in the United States
- Alberto Cutié, priest and television host, EWTN, and a daily talk show on Telemundo Network
- Emilio Falero, artist
- Alina Fernández, radio personality, daughter and critic of Fidel Castro
- Teresita Fernández, artist
- Lourdes Gomez Franca, artist and poet
- Coco Fusco, artist and writer
- Agustin Gainza, artist
- Fernando Garcia (1945–1989), conceptual artist
- Ric Garcia, painter and printmaker
- Juan Gonzalez, painter
- Félix González-Torres, artist
- Jose Acosta Hernandez, artist
- Pedro Hernandez, sculptor
- Nestor Hernández, photographer
- Dinorah de Jesús Rodriguez, experimental filmmaker
- Emilio Hector Rodriguez, contemporary visual artist, abstraction, painter, photographer
- Miguel Jorge (1928–1984), painter
- Josignacio, abstract artist
- Guerra de la Paz, Cuban-born American artist duo Alain Guerra and Neraldo de la Paz, who work in sculpture, installation and photography
- Ana Mendieta (1948–1985), sculptor, performance artist, feminist
- Maria Teresa Mestre, wife of Luxembourg's constitutional monarch Grand Duke Henri; her title is Grand Duchess
- Maria Elena Milagro de Hoyos, woman at the center of the Carl Tanzler case
- José María Mijares, painter
- Adriano Nicot, painter
- Javier Peres, contemporary art dealer
- Dionisio Perkins, painter
- Henry Pollack (born 1961), radio host of "Havana Rock"
- Miguel Rodez, artist, curator
- Jorge Rodriguez-Gerada, artist
- Rocío Rodríguez, painter
- Emilio Sánchez, contemporary art painter and lithographer
- Scull Twins (1930–2007), sister artist duo, painter and sculptors
- Baruj Salinas (1935–2024), abstract expressionist painter
- Mario Torroella, artist and architect
- Ricardo Viera (1945–2020) Cuban-born American visual artist, educator, curator
- Pedro Vizcaíno (born 1966) painter, installation artist
- Consuelo Yznaga, wife of George Montagu, 8th Duke of Manchester
- Wifredo Lam (1902–1982) Modernist painter

== Others ==
- Juanita Castro (1933–2023), sister of former Cuban Communist Party first secretary Fidel Castro and incumbent First Secretary Raúl Castro; has lived in the United States since 1964 and is a naturalized citizen
- Joaquín "Jack" García, retired FBI agent who infiltrated the Gambino crime family
- X González, activist and advocate for gun control; survivor of the Stoneman Douglas High School shooting
- Vida Guerra, Cuban-born American glamour model
- Carlos Maza, born to Cuban immigrant parents; political activist
- Emilio Núñez (1855–1922), soldier, dentist, and politician
- Ana María Polo, Cuban-born American lawyer and Hispanic television arbitrator on Caso Cerrado
- Manny Puig, Cuban-born wildlife entertainer
- Enrique Ros (1924–2013), Cuban-born businessman and activist opposed to Cuban president Fidel Castro
- Andrea Louise Simon, community leader
- Alfred-Maurice de Zayas, Cuban-born lawyer; writer; historian; expert in the field of human rights and international law; retired high-ranking United Nations official; peace activist; since 2012 the United Nations Independent Expert on the Promotion of a Democratic and Equitable International Order (also known as Special Rapporteur), appointed by the United Nations Human Rights Council
- Jose Battle, Cuban-born refugee who was a police officer during the Batista regime. He was the founder and head of an organized crime syndicate known as the corporation, also referred to as the "Cuban Mafia". Battle controlled bolita rackets within the Cuban-American community.
- Moisés Silva, (born September 4, 1945), Cuban-born American biblical scholar and translator. A past president of the Evangelical Theological Society (1997), Silva for many years had been an ordained minister of the Orthodox Presbyterian Church.
- Paul Crespo, is a conservative political commentator, consultant and activist. A former captain in the U.S. Marine Corps, he has had a varied military and civilian career, and gained notoriety for his strong political opinions. He is best known for his conservative and free market views and passion for the constitutional and founding principles of the United States of America.
