= Robert Lima =

Robert Lima may refer to:

- Robert Lima (poet) (born 1935), Cuban poet and academic
- Robert Lima (footballer) (1972–2021), Uruguayan footballer
