= Albert Siu =

American physician and geriatrician

- Born: 1954 or 1955 (age between 70 and 72); Havana, Cuba
- Citizenship: American
- Education: University of California at Berkeley, Yale, University of California, Los Angeles School of Medicine
- Scientific career
- Fields: internal medicine, geriatrics palliative care
- Workplaces: Mount Sinai Hospital, James J. Peters VA Medical Center

Albert Siu is a Cuban American internist and geriatrician and the Ellen and Howard C. Katz Chairman and Professor of the Brookdale Department of Geriatrics and Palliative Medicine at Mount Sinai Hospital in New York City. He is also the director of the Geriatric Research, Education, and Clinical Center at the James J. Peters VA Medical Center in The Bronx, a senior associate editor of Health Services Research, a senior fellow of the Brookdale Foundation and a former trustee of the Nathan Cummings Foundation.

Siu is the author of 9 book chapters and more than 100 peer-reviewed publications. He has co-authored 50 publications for the United States Preventive Services Task Force. His department at Mount Sinai treats nearly 5,000 elderly patients a year and houses a number of programs including the Martha Stewart Center for Living, the Hertszberg Palliative Care Institute, the National Palliative Care Research Center, the Medicare Innovations Collaborative and the Mount Sinai Visiting Doctors. The department partnerships include the James J. Peters VA Medical Center in the Bronx and the Long Island Jewish Home.

== Biography ==
Siu was born in Havana, Cuba, of Chinese Cuban descent. He graduated from the University of California at Berkeley with a degree in biochemistry in 1976. He earned his medical degree from Yale School of Medicine in 1980 and completed a master's degree in public health at UCLA School of Medicine in 1986.

After completing a residency in internal medicine at UCLA in 1983, Siu remained there as assistant professor of medicine, with a joint appointment as health services researcher for the RAND Corporation in Santa Monica, where he was the author of 20 monographs.

Siu served as chief of the Division of Geriatric Medicine at UCLA from 1989 until 1993, when he was named deputy commissioner in the New York State Department of Health. Concurrently, from 1994 to 1995, Siu was associate professor of health policy and management at the University of Albany School of Public Health. In 1995 Siu was named professor of health policy at the Icahn School of Medicine at Mount Sinai in New York. In 1998 he was named Mount Sinai's Clifford Spingarn, MD Professor of Medicine and chief of the Division of General Internal Medicine and medical director of the Primary Care and Medical Services Care Center. In 2003 he was named the Ellen and Howard Katz Professor of Geriatrics and Palliative Medicine.

== Grants ==
- National Institute on Aging, K24 AG00918, Patient-oriented Research in Aging
- National Institutes of Health, K30 HL04131, Clinical Research Curriculum Award
- Use of VA and Medicare Services by Older Veterans with New Disability, VA Health Services Research and Development, IIR 03-226

== Publications ==
Partial list:

- "Using nontraditional risk factors in coronary heart disease risk assessment: U.S. Preventive Services Task Force recommendation statement". Ann Intern Med. 151: 474–82. 2009. PMID 19805770.
- Federman, AD; Sano, M; Wolf, MS; Siu, AL; Halm, EA (August 2009). "Health literacy and cognitive performance in older adults". J Am Geriatr Soc. 57: 1475–80. doi:10.1111/j.1532-5415.2009.02347.x. PMC 2754116. PMID 19515101.
- Federman, AD; Safran, DG; Keyhani, S; Cole, H; Halm, EA; Siu, AL (April 2009). "Awareness of pharmaceutical cost-assistance programs among inner-city seniors". Am J Geriatr Pharmacother. 7: 117–29. doi:10.1016/j.amjopharm.2009.04.003. PMC 2739236. PMID 19447364.
- Hung, WW; Wisnivesky, JP; Siu, AL; Ross, JS (July 2009). "Cognitive decline among patients with chronic obstructive pulmonary disease". Am. J. Respir. Crit. Care Med. 180: 134–7. doi:10.1164/rccm.200902-0276OC. PMID 19423714.
- Keyhani, S; Hebert, PL; Ross, JS; Federman, A; Zhu, CW; Siu, AL (December 2008). "Electronic health record components and the quality of care". Med Care. 46: 1267–72. doi:10.1097/MLR.0b013e31817e18ae. PMID 19300317.
- "Aspirin for the prevention of cardiovascular disease: U.S. Preventive Services Task Force recommendation statement". Ann Intern Med. 150: 396–404. 2009. PMID 19293072.
- "Screening for skin cancer: U.S. Preventive Services Task Force recommendation statement". Ann Intern Med. 150: 188–93. 2009. PMID 19189908.
- Keyhani, S; Siu, AL (December 2008). "The underuse of overuse research". Health Serv Res. 43: 1923–30. doi:10.1111/j.1475-6773.2008.00920.x. PMC 2614006. PMID 19166411.
- Siu, AL; Spragens, LH; Inouye, SK; Morrison, RS; Leff, B (2009). "The ironic business case for chronic care in the acute care setting". Health Aff (Millwood). 28: 113–25. doi:10.1377/hlthaff.28.1.113. PMID 19124861.
- Morrison, RS; Flanagan, S; Fischberg, D; Cintron, A; Siu, AL (January 2009). "A novel interdisciplinary analgesic program reduces pain and improves function in older adults after orthopedic surgery". J Am Geriatr Soc. 57: 1–10. doi:10.1111/j.1532-5415.2008.02063.x. PMC 2729399. PMID 19054187.
- Federman, AD; Safran, DG; Keyhani, S; Siu, AL; Halm, EA (September 2008). "Low levels of awareness of pharmaceutical cost-assistance programs among inner-city seniors". JAMA. 300: 1412–4. doi:10.1001/jama.300.12.1412. PMC 2722064. PMID 18812531.
- Penrod, JD; Litke, A; Hawkes, WG; et al. (August 2008). "The association of race, gender, and comorbidity with mortality and function after hip fracture". J. Gerontol. A Biol. Sci. Med. Sci. 63: 867–72. PMID 18772476.
- Iosifescu, A; Halm, EA; McGinn, T; Siu, AL; Federman, AD (November 2008). "Beliefs about generic drugs among elderly adults in hospital-based primary care practices". Patient Educ Couns. 73: 377–83. doi:10.1016/j.pec.2008.07.012. PMC 2739237. PMID 18706784.
- "Universal screening for hearing loss in newborns: US Preventive Services Task Force recommendation statement". Pediatrics. 122: 143–8. 2008. doi:10.1542/peds.2007-2210. PMID 18595997.
- "Screening for gestational diabetes mellitus: U.S. Preventive Services Task Force recommendation statement". Ann Intern Med. 148: 759–65. 2008. PMID 18490688.
- Ross, JS; Keyhani, S; Keenan, PS; et al. (May 2008). "Use of recommended ambulatory care services: is the Veterans Affairs quality gap narrowing?". Arch. Intern. Med. 168: 950–8. doi:10.1001/archinte.168.9.950. PMID 18474759.
- Ross, JS; Keyhani, S; Keenan, PS; et al. (March 2008). "Dual use of Veterans Affairs services and use of recommended ambulatory care". Med Care. 46: 309–16. doi:10.1097/MLR.0b013e31815b9db3. PMID 18388846.
- Farber, J; Siu, A; Bloom, P (November 2007). "How much time do physicians spend providing care outside of office visits?". Ann. Intern. Med. 147: 693–8. PMID 18025445.
- Keyhani, S; Ross, JS; Hebert, P; Dellenbaugh, C; Penrod, JD; Siu, AL (December 2007). "Use of preventive care by elderly male veterans receiving care through the Veterans Health Administration, Medicare fee-for-service, and Medicare HMO plans". Am J Public Health. 97: 2179–85. doi:10.2105/AJPH.2007.114934. PMC 2089117. PMID 17971544.
- Guirguis-Blake, J; Calonge, N; Miller, T; Siu, A; Teutsch, S; Whitlock, E (July 2007). "Current processes of the U.S. Preventive Services Task Force: refining evidence-based recommendation development". Ann. Intern. Med. 147: 117–22. PMID 17576998.
