= Scull Twins =

Cuban-Chinese folk artists (1930s–2007)

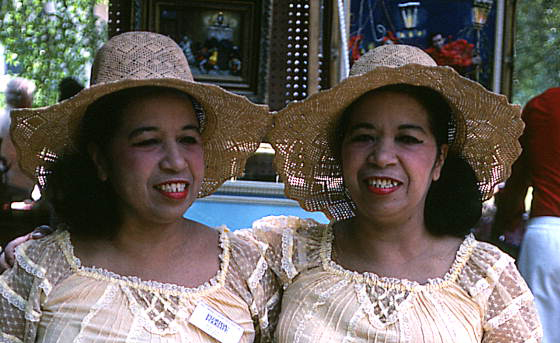
Haydée and Sahara Scull-1985

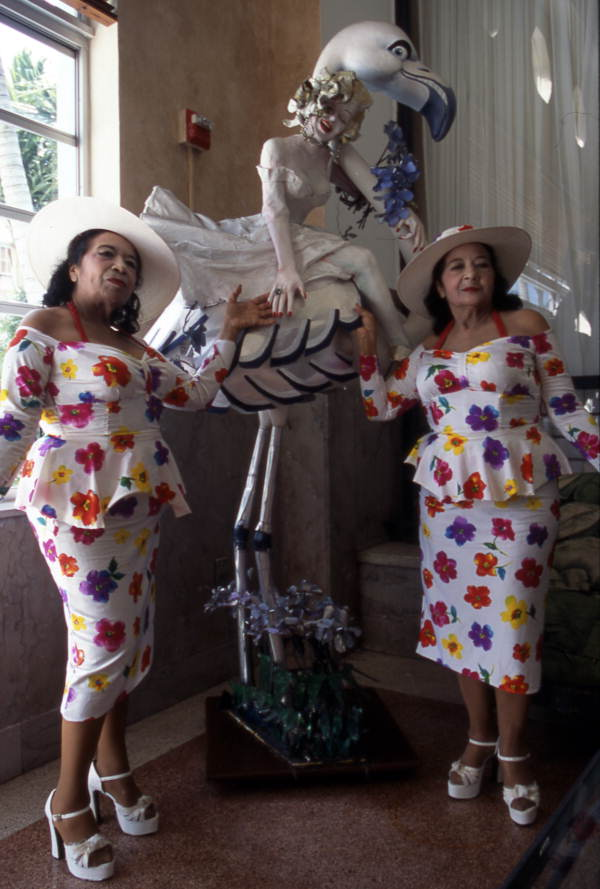
Haydee and Sahara Scull with a piece of art, 2003

Haydée Scull (1930s–2007) and Sahara Scull (1930s–2008), known as the Scull Twins or the Scull sisters, were a duo of Cuban-Chinese folk-artists.

== Life ==
Born in Cuba in the 1930s, the sisters created humorous three-dimensional paintings and sculptures of Old Havana and Florida, using paper mache, wire and acrylic paint.

Haydée immigrated to the United States in 1969 with her daughter, Elizabeth, joining her son Michael in Miami, Florida. Sahara immigrated to the United States in 1973, joining Haydée in Miami. The sisters wore matching, colorful dresses and hats around the Miami art and party scene.

They were referenced in a song entitled "Scull Twins" by Duncan Browne.

A copy of the Scull Twins' scrapbook is in the Archives of American Art at the Smithsonian.
