= Jorge Manuel =

- Born: July 19, 1980 (age 45); Miami, Florida, U.S.
- Label: Jorge Manuel

Jorge Manuel (born July 19, 1980) is a Cuban-American fashion designer based in Miami.

== Early life ==
Jorge Manuel was born in the beautiful city of Miami. He grew up a product of the cultural diversity of this dynamic city, while attending private schools mostly influenced by Latin American families. He earned a degree in Advertising and Liberal Studies from Florida International University, where he took a variety of classes in Design, Architecture, Art History, and Graphics.

Jorge Manuel's work draws on the cultural diversity of his city, combining influences that include Caribbean aesthetics, Asian minimalism, cubist forms, and Art Deco elements.

Jorge began his career as a wedding planner at the age of 15 and quickly became a popular wedding planner in the community, opening his first event company at 16.

Yet, he always found himself sketching: on a discarded napkin, on the corner of paperwork. His artistic expression found its niche in something very close to home: his grandmother died still nursing her dream of one day opening her own bridal atelier. Jorge Manuel's first wedding gown was designed and produced at the age of 17, and he continued designing for private clients and boutiques. His couture gowns, handcrafted and designed, have been worn by discriminating clients who wanted something unique, and who recognized the perspective of Jorge Manuel’s signature style.

== Career ==
After four years in the making, Jorge Manuel launched his first collection of Haute Couture and prêt-a-porter gowns, the Etelvina collection, in 2008. The inspirations for his first collection were the important women that surrounded him and influenced his life. He took the abstract - their experiences, motivations, successes, personalities – and gave them life, and fluid, fabric form. Jorge Manuel’s first collection was unveiled at a Jorge Manuel fashion show to benefit the National Breast Cancer Foundation. In connection with a local television broadcaster, Univision 23, Jorge Manuel donated a gown to a breast cancer survivor, who wore it her wedding - a wedding she at one time believed she would not live to see. “I believe this was one of my best moments,” remembers Jorge Manuel, “sharing the gift of a dream fulfilled with someone who just refused to give up.”

Jorge Manuel introduced his second collection, The Demetrius Collection in the Fall of 2010. The inspiration for this collection, extracted from the works of Lewis Carroll, embraced the fantasy, the ethereal and the innocent. The designer brought to life a collection based on the “story of a girl named Alice” who found her place among the “different,” yet beautiful characters of a Wonderland. Each scene reflected the style in the dress, depending where she is and with whom. The unveiling of this collection was a turning point for the young designer. Without a doubt, the campaign for this collection challenged his ability to create a solid structure for his clever gowns, to imagine visuals in form of art for the scenes and to envision the characters far beyond the concept of design.

His third collection, The Matilda Collection, was named after his grandmother. The Matilda Collection is all about old world fashion meeting new world design. The collection features classic silhouettes with contemporary designs created through the use of clean lines. His work on this collection would catch the attention of bridal magazines including "Weddings Unveiled" and "Martha Stewart Weddings."
