= Mauricio J. Tamargo =

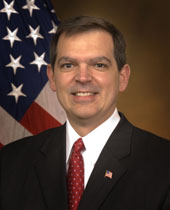
- Tamargo in 2001
- Born: October 22, 1957 (age 68); Havana, Cuba
- Spouse: (1985-present) Tara Gioia (b. 1956)
- Parent(s): Jorge Enrique Tamargo y de Diego (b. 1933); Martha Maria del Portillo y Tamargo(b. 1933)

Mauricio J. Tamargo (born Mauricio J. Tamargo-del Portillo on October 22, 1957, in Havana, Cuba) was the 14th Chairman of the Foreign Claims Settlement Commission. He was nominated by President George W. Bush in July 2001. He left the Justice Department in February 2010.

Tamargo is the 2nd son and 3rd child of 8 children born to Jorge Tamargo and Martha del Portillo. He arrived with his family in 1961 and lived in Wisconsin and later in Florida. He holds a Bachelor of Arts in history from the University of Miami and a JD from Cumberland School of Law at Samford University. He married his wife, Tara, in 1985 and they have two children. They presently live in Virginia.

Prior to being confirmed to the FCSC, he was the Staff Director for the International Operations and Human Rights Subcommittee of the International Relations Committee, and Chief of Staff and Legal Counsel to Congresswoman Ileana Ros-Lehtinen, for whom he had earlier served as her Legislative Director. Before working in these positions, he served as Staff Director and Counsel for two other Subcommittees of the U.S. House International Relations Committee, the Subcommittee on Africa and the Subcommittee on International Economic Policy and Trade. Earlier in his career, Tamargo served as Administrative Assistant to then-Florida State Representative Ros-Lehtinen, and as Staff Assistant to Senator Paula Hawkins. During law school, he also served as a law clerk to the Chairman of the National Labor Relations Board.

His grandfathers, Miguel Angel Tamargo-Vidal and Alonso del Portillo Marcano, were prominent Attorney-Notaries in Cuba, as was his great-grandfather, Miguel Luis Tamargo-Bautista.

== References and external links ==
- Law Firm Website
- Historia de Familias Cubanas (Ediciones Universal, Miami, Florida 1985) ISBN 0-89729-380-0 (in Spanish)
- Origenes - Compendio Historico Genealogico del Linea Zayas Descendencia del Infante Don Jaime de Aragon (Zayas Publishing, 2003, ISBN 0-9672876-0-X) (in Spanish)

Specific
