= Robert Lima (poet) =

American poet (born 1935)

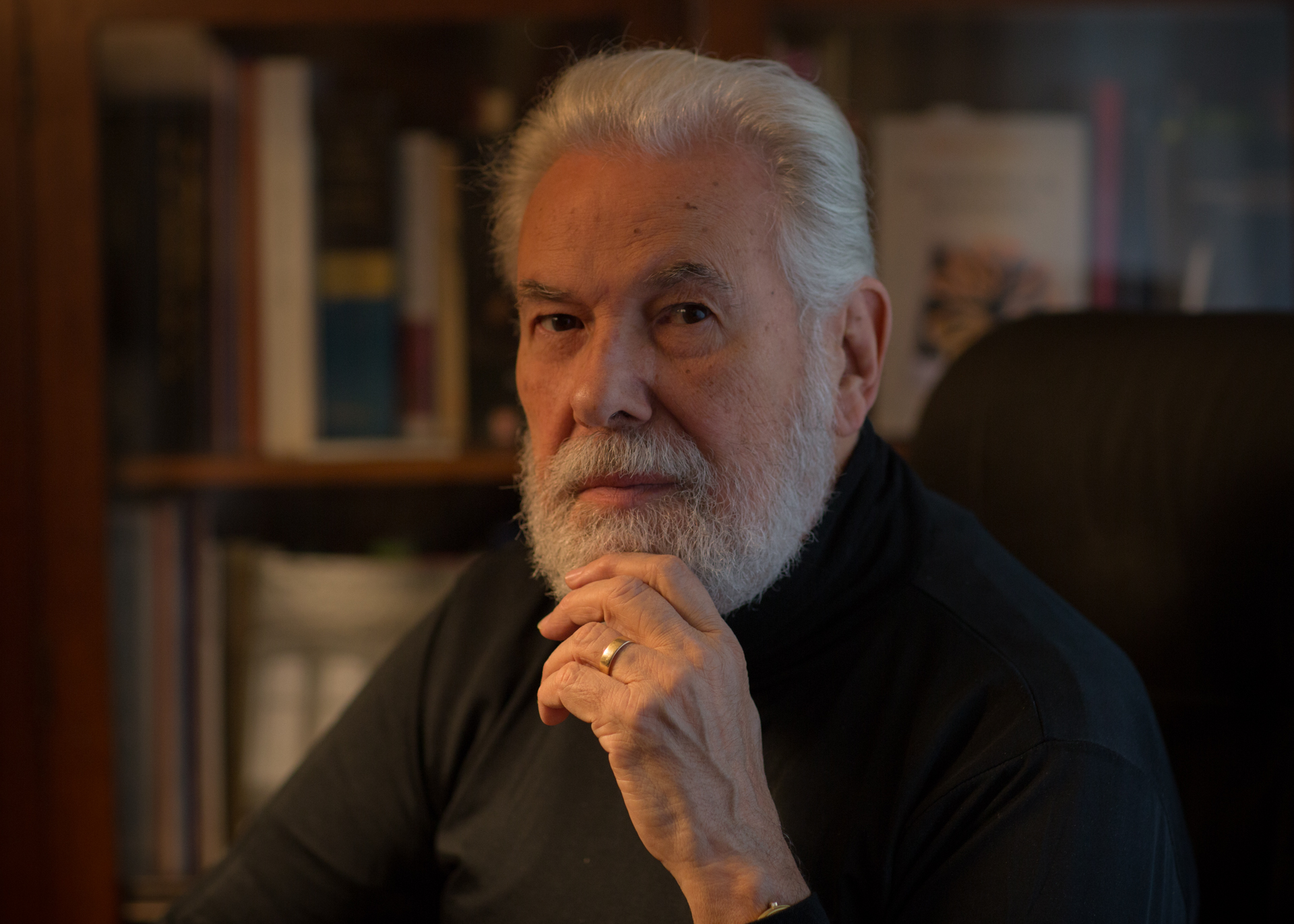

Robert Lima (born 1935) is a Cuban-born American poet, literary critic, bibliographer, playwright, editor, biographer, and translator. He is a professor emeritus of Spanish and Comparative Literatures at Pennsylvania State University, as well as fellow emeritus of the Institute for the Arts and Humanistic Studies. Lima is an academician of the Academia Norteamericana de la Lengua Española and a corresponding member of the Real Academia Española. Honored as a distinguished alumnus by Villanova University, he was also inducted into the Enxebre Orden da Vieira in Spain and dubbed Knight Commander in the Order of Queen Isabel of Spain by King Juan Carlos I. His 40-year career as a university professor and writer was heralded in A Confluence of Words. Studies in Honor of Robert Lima, published by Juan de la Cuesta Hispanic Monographs in 2011. In 2017, he was received into the Imperial Hispanic Order of Charles V, at the Alcazar Palace in Segovia, Spain as Knight Commander Gran Placa, at the hands of the Prince of Borbon.

== Background ==
Lima received a BA in English, Philosophy and History (1957) and MA in Theatre and Drama (1961) from Villanova University, and a Ph.D. in Romance Literatures from New York University (1968). After active duty in the United States Army Reserve, he worked in New York City in publishing and film, as well as in broadcasting for Voice of America before starting his teaching career at Hunter College of the City University of New York (1962–1965). Thereafter, he taught at Pennsylvania State University (1965–2002), with stints abroad in Peru (U. de San Marcos and U. Católica) as a Senior Fulbright Scholar and in Cameroon (U. of Yaoundé) with grants from the United States Information Agency. Up to mid-2018, he has published 36 books, over 150 articles in a variety of fields, including on the works of Lorca, Valle-Inclán, Borges, Afro-American religions and facets of esoterica in world drama. Over 400 of his poems have appeared throughout the U.S. and abroad in periodicals, anthologies, and in his poetry collections. In the 1960s he read poetry in many Greenwich Village venues, co-editing the anthology Seventh Street: Poems from 'Les Deux Megots' (1961) and the second Judson Review. In 1974, he created Surrealism—A Celebration, a multi-media event at Penn State in honor of the 50th anniversary of the surrealist movement. Sponsored by The Pennsylvania Humanities Council, on whose board he sat, he created Poetry on the Buses in Central Pennsylvania in 1985. From March through August 2004, Pennsylvania State University libraries exhibited The Poetic World of Robert Lima, a retrospective of his poetry career from 1955 to the then present. His poem Astrals won first prize in the Phi Kappa Phi poetry competition for 2009 and was published in the society's journal, Forum (spring 2009). His illustrated poetry has been exhibited at the Schlow Centre Region Library, the State Theater, both in State College, PA, and at the Bellefonte Art Museum in Pennsylvania. In 2017, he was invited to record his poetry at the Library of Congress Hispanic Division for the prestigious cache of recordings by prominent writers.

Lima's biography appears in Who's Who in the World, Who's Who in America, Who's Who in the East, Who's Who in American Education, World Who's Who of Authors, and creative writing directories in the U.S. and abroad.

== Bibliography ==
- Herzberg, Max J. The Readers Encyclopedia of American Literature. New York: T.Y. Crowell, 1962.
- The Theatre of García Lorca. New York: Las Américas, 1963.
- Barrenechea, A. M. Borges: the Labyrinth Maker. Selected and Translated by Robert Lima. New York: New York University Press, 1965.
- del Valle-Inclán, Ramón. Autobiography, Aesthetics, Aphorisms. Selected and Translated by Robert Lima. Monaca, PA: The Pennsylvania State University, 1966. Limited Centennial Edition.
- Ramón del Valle-Inclán: an annotated bibliography: Volume 1. University Park, PA: Penn State University Libraries, 1972.
- Surrealism. A Celebration. Edited by Robert Lima. University Park, PA: Pennsylvania State University Press, 1973.
- Recuerda, J. Martín. The Inmates of the Convent of St. Mary Egyptian. Revised and Translated by Robert Lima. New York: Performing Arts Journal Publications, 1985.
- Fathoms. State College, PA: The Carnation Press, 1981. Poetry.
- Dos ensayos sobre teatro español de los veinte. Murcia, Spain: U. de Murcia, 1984.
- The Olde Ground. Waltham, MA: Society for Inter-Celtic Arts and Culture, 1985. Poetry.
- del Valle-Inclán, Ramón. The Lamp of Marvels. Translated by Robert Lima. W. Stockbridge, MA: Lindisfarne Press, 1986.
- Valle-Inclán. The Theatre of His Life. Columbia, MO: Missouri UP, 1988.
- Mayaland. Madrid, Spain: Editorial Betania, 1992. Poetry.
- Savage Acts: Four Plays by Ramón del Valle-Inclán. Selected and Translated by Robert Lima. New Brunswick, NJ: Estreno Spanish Plays, 1993.
- Borges and the Esoteric. Edited by Robert Lima. Pittsburgh, PA: Duquesne University Press, 1993.
- Dark Prisms. Occultism in Hispanic Drama. Lexington, KY: University Press of Kentucky, 1995.
- "Valle-Inclán. El teatro de su vida. Vigo—Santiago de Compostela, Spain: Editorial Nigra, Spain, 1995.
- Ramón del Valle-Inclán: An Annotated Bibliography. London, UK: Grant & Cutler, 1999.
- Sardinia / Sardegna. Lafayette, IN: Bordighera, 2000. Prose and Poetry.
- The Alchemical Art of Leonora Carrington. Pullman, WA: Washington State University, 2000.
- The Dramatic World of Valle-Inclán. London, UK: Boydell & Brewer, 2003.
- Tracking the Minotaur. Indianapolis, IN: Author House, 2003. Poetry.
- Stages of Evil. Occultism in Western Theatre and Drama. Lexington, KY: University Press of Kentucky, 2005.
- The Pointing Bone. Philadelphia, PA: XLibris, 2008. Poetry.
- The International Bibliography of Studies on the Life and Works of Ramón del Valle-Inclán 2 Vols. State College, PA: The Orlando Press, 2009.
- Prismas oscuros. Ocultismo en el teatro hispánico. Madrid, Spain: Editorial Fundamentos—RESAD, 2010.
- " Tracking the Minotaur." CD Recorded at the Studios of WPSU, Penn State University, 2011. Intro by Helen Manfull.
- " SELF." State College, PA: The Orlsndo Press, 2012. Poetry.
- " Por caminos Errantes. Poesia." Moorpark, CA: Floricanto Press, 2014. Poetry.
- "¡Some People! Anecdotes, Images and Letters of Persons of Interest." State College, PA: The Orlando Press, 2015. Memoir.
- " Words of Power. Adages, Axioms & Aphorisms." Edited and Translated from the Works of Ramón del Valle-Inclán. Los Angeles, CA: Floricanto Press, 2015.
- " Provenance and Residuals. Bringing the Past Forward." State College, PA: The Orlando Press, 2015. Autobiography.
- " CELESTIALS." Georgetown, KY: Finishing Line Press, 2017. Poetry.
- " Cancioneria Cubana." State College, PA: The Orlando Press, 2017. Poetry based on Cuban songs.
- " Ikons of the Past. Poetry of the Hispanic Americas." Selected & Translated by Robert Lima. Moorpark, CA: Floricanto Press, 2018. Poetry.
- Manuel Millares Vázquez, “21 Años,” Edited and Introduced by Robert Lima Millares. Noia, Galicia, Spain: A.C. Barbantia, 2018. Novel.
