= Alexandria Holloway =

Anericsn music educator and academic administrator (1947–2026)

- Born: Alexandria Jocelyn Holloway; April 15, 1947; Jackson, Mississippi, U.S.
- Died: July 18, 2026 (aged 79)
- Education: Jackson State University (BA); University of Illinois Urbana-Champaign (MA); Florida State University (PhD)
- Occupations: Music educator, academic administrator, choral director
- Employer: Miami Dade College
- Known for: Founding dean of the Honors College at Miami Dade College

Alexandria Jocelyn Holloway (April 15, 1947 – July 18, 2026) was an American music educator, choral director and academic administrator. She spent 35 years at Miami Dade College, arriving in 1976 as a piano and music instructor and rising through the music department chairmanship and deanships on three campuses to become the founding dean of the college's Honors College, which she built and launched in 2002. She also directed the college's JUBA Gospel Ensemble, whose gospel choir course was described as the first of its kind in Florida, served as a church minister of music, and was president of the National Black Music Caucus.

== Early life and education ==
Holloway was born on April 15, 1947, in Jackson, Mississippi, to Clifford Holloway and Alfanette Holloway. After graduating from high school she attended Jackson State University, earning a Bachelor of Arts in music education in 1968, and went directly on to the University of Illinois at Urbana-Champaign, where she received a Master of Arts in music education in 1970. She later earned a Doctor of Philosophy in music education from Florida State University in 1984. She said she had always known that she loved teaching and working with students.

== Career ==
=== Early teaching ===
Holloway began her career teaching music in the public schools of Champaign, Illinois, at Garden Hills Elementary School, a position she held for about five years. In 1973 she spent a year at her alma mater, Jackson State University, teaching music and piano courses, then returned to Champaign, where she taught at Franklin Junior High School.

=== Miami Dade College ===
In 1976 a friend at the University of Illinois told Holloway that the chairman of the music department at Miami-Dade Community College (later Miami Dade College) wanted to offer her a job. Doubtful that Miami was where she wanted to be, she accepted on a one-year trial basis, teaching music and piano courses at the Kendall Campus. She later said she stayed because of what she saw there: students who arrived with minimal preparation and, given the opportunity, excelled.

When the college's choir director fell ill, Holloway filled in, and the students decided the group should become a gospel choir. The college went on to offer a one-credit gospel choir course, reported to be the first in the state. The ensemble, known as JUBA, recorded the album JUBA Live at Criteria Studios in North Miami in 1985.

Not long after the album's release Holloway became chair of the music department, a post she held for about six months. (Note: The HistoryMakers biography instead states that Holloway was appointed chairman of the music department in 1976, the year she joined the college. The Reporter's contemporaneous 2011 profile, which is followed here, places the appointment shortly after the 1985 release of JUBA Live.) She was then appointed associate dean over the college's arts division at the Kendall Campus in 1986, a role in which she oversaw construction of the Martin and Pat Fine Center for the Arts. After Eduardo Padrón became college president in 1995, he offered her the post of interim executive dean at the Homestead Campus, which she valued for the closer contact it gave her with students. She was subsequently appointed academic dean at the Wolfson Campus, whose institutional culture she came to regard fondly.

=== Honors College ===
In 2001 Padrón asked Holloway to start a new program, the Honors College. She spent a year researching honors programs at other institutions, and the Honors College launched in 2002 with the Wolfson Campus as its catalyst; it expanded to the Kendall and North campuses in 2003. The program was designed for high-achieving, first-time-in-college students, preparing them to earn an associate degree with honors and transfer to selective universities.

Virginia Fuillerat, then director of the Honors College at the Wolfson Campus, credited Holloway with taking Padrón's directive and making the Honors College a reality, calling the program her own creation. Padrón, later president emeritus of the college, credited her with setting its academic standards and with turning it into a route into highly selective universities.

Alumni credited her mentorship with shaping their careers, describing an approach that set high expectations while providing sustained support. Students from the program's early cohorts transferred on full scholarships to institutions including Stanford University and Howard University, going on to careers in government, education, medicine, and technology, and many stayed in contact with her long after graduating.

Of her students Holloway said in 2011: "I don't have any birth children, but I have hundreds of children."

=== Retirement ===
Holloway had been due to retire five years earlier but instead entered the Deferred Retirement Option Program of the Florida Retirement System; having completed her time in the program, she retired on August 31, 2011, after 43 years in education, 35 of them at Miami Dade College. She was succeeded as dean by Pascale Charlot.

She served for many years as minister of music at Bethel Baptist Church of Richmond Heights, Florida. After leaving the college she founded AH Academic Consulting Group, serving as its president and chief executive officer. On March 10, 2017, she recorded an oral history interview with The HistoryMakers.

== Civic and organizational involvement ==
Holloway served on the boards of the New World School of the Arts, the YMCA South Dade Family Center, the Concert Association of Florida, and the Jubilate Chorale. She was president of the National Black Music Caucus, renamed the National Association for the Study and Performance of African American Music in 1997, and in 1996 became chapter president of The Links, Inc.

In 2009 she was named to Success magazine's list of the 25 most influential and prominent Black women.

== Death and legacy ==
Holloway died of breast cancer on July 18, 2026, at the age of 79. Her survivors included two nephews, Camod Lynch Sr. and Creston C. Lynch, and her aunt, Aretta Kelley Smith.

The Dr. Alexandria Holloway Golden Dream Scholarship Fund, established in 2011 by a former Honors College student and administered through the Miami Dade College Foundation, supports students in the Honors College. Announcing her death, the Honors College described her as its founding dean and a visionary leader whose service had left a lasting mark on generations of students, alumni, and staff, and directed those wishing to honor her memory to the scholarship fund. Miami Dade College president Madeline Pumariega said in a statement that Holloway had devoted some 35 years to the institution, and that "Music was not simply her discipline; it was her ministry."

Asked to name a favorite quote in her 2017 oral history interview, Holloway gave a maxim about teaching: "Teachers are known by the students they teach."
