= Boxing for Cuba =

Boxing for Cuba: An Immigrant’s Story of Despair, Endurance, and Redemption
- Author: Guillermo Vicente Vidal
- Language: English
- Genre: Memoir
- Publisher: Ghost Road Press
- Publication date: 2007
- Pages: 258
- ISBN: 978-097-894-5602

Boxing for Cuba: An Immigrant’s Story of Despair, Endurance, and Redemption is the memoir of Guillermo (“Bill”) Vicente Vidal published by Ghost Road Press in November 2007. The book documents the Vidal family as they flee from Cuba in the 1960s and eventually establish a home in Colorado. After leaving Cuba in 1961 through Operation Peter Pan, Bill Vidal and his two brothers were taken to an orphanage in Pueblo, Colorado. Vidal served as mayor of the City of Denver, Colorado from January to July, 2011.

== Background ==
Born in 1951 in Camagüey, Cuba, Guillermo (“Bill”) spent the first 8 years of his life living a comfortable life with his parents—Marta Teresa Ramos Almendros and Roberto Emiliano Vidal—and twin older brothers – Roberto (“Bob”) and Juan Antonio (“John”). Soon after Fidel Castro overthrew Batista in 1959, the Vidal family began to observe a devastating situation and began to worry that their family was in danger. So, in an attempt to keep the family safe and together Marta and Roberto sent their three sons to America in 1961 as part of the Pedro Pan project with the intention of joining them soon in Miami. By 1961 the Pedro Pan project had run out of foster families, so Vidal and his two older brothers were sent to the Sacred Heart Orphanage in Pueblo, Colorado. After spending three years at Sacred Heart, Marta and Roberto finally escaped Cuba and reunited the family in Littleton, Colorado. The family succeeded despite the challenges of assimilation, discrimination, and family turbulence. By 1969 all five family members were taking classes at the University of Colorado Denver: Roberto Senior working towards a master's degree in Education, Marta Teresa taking art classes to teach elementary art, Bob studying political science, John studying speech and drama, and Bill studying engineering. After graduating from CU Denver, Bill began working as an engineer for the Colorado Department of Transportation, eventually being appointed as executive director of the department by Governor Roy Romer in 1994. Vidal was appointed as Manager of Public Works and Deputy Mayor by Denver Mayor John Hickenlooper in 2003.

In January 2011, Vidal assumed the duties of mayor of the City of Denver, Colorado, after the current mayor, John Hickenlooper resigned to assume the duties of governor of Colorado.

== Summary ==
The book begins with Vidal detailing his early childhood. Vidal discusses the turbulent marriage of his parents as well as the political turmoil when Castro overthrew Batista. He details his close relationship with his two brothers, Roberto and Juan Antonio, and the family’s relatively comfortable life in Camaguey in the 1950s. In the early sections of the book Vidal also takes the reader through the early life of his parents and the beginnings of a turbulent marriage, detailing his mother’s depression and destructive behavior as well as his father’s excessive desire for success.

Vidal remembers the first days of Castro’s regime: watching Castro ride through the streets of a nearby town on a tank and being lifted by his parents to touch Castro’s hand. After those early days though, Vidal recounts how his life drastically changed. He narrates how soon people began to live in fear of Castro’s army and his spies, some of whom where neighbors or close friends of the Vidal’s. In September 1961, Marta and Roberto took their three boys to Havana, Cuba, in order to send their sons to the United States for safety. The Vidal boys left communist Cuba on September 29, 1961, with other Cuban children seeking exile through Operation Pedro Pan. Upon arrival in Miami, the Vidal boys expected to be picked up by family members who had already escaped Cuba and were living in Miami, but when no one arrived the three were taken to a temporary housing camp. Eventually the boys were moved to Sacred Heart Orphanage in Pueblo, Colorado. En route to Colorado the boys met Robert F. Kennedy, U.S. Attorney General at the time. In the span of two years, 10-year-old Vidal had met two of the most influential men of the time.

Vidal’s life at Sacred Heart Orphanage was marked by fear of the harsh treatment from both the caretaker and older boys, as well as the challenges of learning English and adapting to the quirks of American culture. During their three years at Sacred Heart, the Vidal boys appeared to leave behind their Cuban heritage, striving to become “real” Americans and even adopting distinctly American names—Bill, John, and Bob. Uncertain if or when their parents would ever escape Cuba to reunite with them, the boys adjusted as best they could to their new life in Pueblo.

On April 11, 1964, the Vidal family was reunited after Marta and Roberto emigrated to Mexico and eventually the United States. The family relocated to Littleton, Colorado and then later moved into the city of Denver. Though free from the oppression and fear of Castro’s regime, the Vidal family faced innumerable challenges in their new lives in America. The family struggled financially and they were often the victims of hate and discrimination. Moreover, Marta and Roberto's marriage had greatly deteriorated adding to their erratic behavior. Vidal recounts his adolescence as an extremely turbulent time.

Despite domestic hardship the Vidal family was successful – each member of the family took classes at the University of Colorado at Denver. After receiving his degree in engineering Bill went on to work for the Colorado Department of Transportation. He married his high school sweetheart, Christine, and together they had a boy and adopted two girls. Though he flourished professionally Vidal continued to struggle with his relationship with his parents and eventually in his marriage as well. Eventually Bill and Christine divorced. Years later Vidal remarried Gabriela, a Chilean immigrant also working for CDOT.

Vidal credits Gabriela with inspiring him to reconnect with his family and his heritage. It is she who encourages him to return to Cuba in 2001 to try to face and understand his past. The book ends with Vidal returning to his childhood home to try to make sense of his life, and how very different it would be if he had not left as a 10-year-old boy.

== Reception ==
The memoir was well received upon its publication in 2007. Several have endorsed the book including, Denver Mayor John Hickenlooper, Secretary of the U.S. Department of the Interior Ken Salazar, and former President Bill Clinton. Vidal has spoken to many media outlets about Boxing for Cuba and has most recently been interviewed about the connection between his escape from Cuba via the Pedro Pan Project and the initiative to bring Haitian orphans to the United States after the 2010 Haiti earthquake in January.
