= Showstopper! =

1994 book by G. Pascal Zachary

Showstopper! The Breakneck Race to Create Windows NT and the Next Generation at Microsoft
- Author: G. Pascal Zachary
- Language: English
- Publication date: 1994

Showstopper! The Breakneck Race to Create Windows NT and the Next Generation at Microsoft is a 1994 nonfiction book by G. Pascal Zachary. The book explores the corporate culture of Microsoft and the development of Windows NT. Bill Taylor, writing for Harvard Business Review, called it "riveting" and praised its in-depth analysis of Microsoft's history. Grayden Jones of The Spokesman-Review wrote that: "Like NT (New Technology), Zachary’s tale is a bit of a let down, since the project neither failed nor became wildly successful. He spends most of 312 pages describing the pathetic lives of programmers who sold their souls for a chance to ride Microsoft stock options to riches."

== See also ==
- Free Press
