= Joanna Falco-Leshin =

Dr. JoAnna Falco-Leshin
- Born: United States
- Education: University of Miami (PhD)
- Title: Professor of English and Humanities at Miami Dade College
- Spouse: Robert Leshin

JoAnna Falco-Leshin has served as a professor of English and Humanities at Miami Dade College since August 1985.

== Education ==
She received her PhD in higher education administration from the University of Miami in 1988.

== Career ==
Falco-Leshin served as the Wolfson Campus faculty Senate President for seven consecutive years. During her tenure in office, she served under the leadership of then campus president Eduardo J. Padrón. She was elected vice president of Miami Dade College's faculty Senate Consortium. As interim President of the college's Senate's Consortium, she presided over a vote endorsing the faculty's collective bargaining efforts. Falco-Leshin was the first vice president of the United Faculty of Miami Dade College Wolfson Campus. A member of NCTE and the AAUP, she is a strong proponent of academic freedom.

== Awards ==
Falco-Leshin is the recipient of the National Institute for Staff and Organizational Development's award for teaching excellence.

She is the first recipient of the Blockbuster's endowed teaching chair.
