= Polita Grau =

First Lady of Cuba (1915–2000)

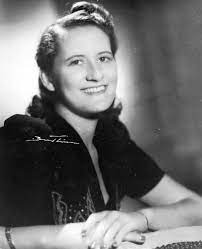
- Born: Maria Leopoldina Grau-Alsina; November 19, 1915; Havana, Cuba
- Died: March 22, 2000 (aged 84); Miami, U.S.
- Years active: Circa 1944–2000
- Known for: First lady of Cuba
- Notable work: Operación Pedro Pan

Polita Grau (born Maria Leopoldina Grau-Alsina 19 November 1915–22 March 2000) was the First Lady of Cuba, a Cuban political prisoner, and the "godmother" of Operation Peter Pan, also known as Operación Pedro Pan, a program which facilitated the exodus of over 14,000 unaccompanied Cuban minors (ages 6 to 18) to the United States between the years 1960 and 1962, following the Cuban Revolution. Grau worked with the Roman Catholic Church, particularly Monsignor Bryan O. Walsh, and the U.S. State Department to place Cuban children in camps and foster homes; many of these children were never reunited with their parents.

== Early life ==
Polita Grau was the daughter of Paulina Alsina and Francisco Grau San Martin, who died on November 30, 1930. Her siblings were Paulina Grau-Alsina, Francisco Grau-Alsina (a Senator of Cuba), and Ramon Grau-Alsina (a Representative of Cuba).

Polita Grau's uncle, Dr. Ramón Grau San Martin was Cuba's president from 1933 to 1934. Her uncle gave Polita the ceremonial title of the "First Lady" during his presidential term. Ramón Grau San Martín was elected as president of Cuba for his second term in the year of 1944, in which he served for four years. He was replaced by Carlos Prío Socarrás in 1948. In addition, Ramón Grau was one of many students who had organized protests going against the administration of General Gerardo Machado. Shortly after, he was sent to prison for his involvement in activities, he was released only on the condition that he would leave Cuba.

In 1959, Castro had removed former President Grau from his post at the university and had also taken all his properties away from him. Researchers are not sure why Castro changed his mind, it is likely due to his respect for Grau, his wisdom, his elderly age, or his loyalty to Cuba by not leaving, unlike many others. Castro had given Grau the opportunity to return to his university post, however, he declined the offer. As Polita sent her children to the U.S., she had also sent her husband Pepe. She sent her husband because he was a high risk for the underground activities that Polita was engaged in. Polita and her brother had seen Pepe outraged and yelled to a group of people "Go on conspiring, you are all going to end up in jail!" Later in her life, Polita retells a past moment of her life when she was walking in downtown Miami when a woman asked her, "Aren’t you Polita Grau?" She also tells her that Polita has helped her bring her son to the United States. Moments like these make Polita proud of what she has accomplished despite the consequences. Polita admits that she would do everything all over again, however, a bit more secretly. Polita Grau's brother later died in 1998.

== Education ==
Grau arrived in Miami from Havana for the first time during her senior year in high school. Grau completed her high school education at St. Patrick's Academy located in Miami Beach. Polita Grau attended the Teresian school in Vedado, Cuba. Polita Grau, as a college student, was involved in radical campus movements to weaken the Gerardo Machado regime. The reason Grau turned against her support of Cuba’s 1959 revolution was after Castro began to nationalize industries.

== Personal life ==
Polita Grau was married twice, first to Roberto Lago-Pereda and then in 1939 to Jose Aguero-Cairo. She had a total of two children, Ramon Francisco and Hilda Maria Aguero-Grau, and six grandchildren. Grau’s first husband, Roberto, had died in 1935 of appendicitis at Jackson Memorial Hospital located in Miami, Florida. Years later, in 1939, Polita married her second husband José Agüero (Pepe), with whom she had two children, a son named Ramón Fransisco also known as Monchy, and her daughter Hilda, known as Chury.

Polita Grau was commonly known as Polita, but this particular name never appeared on any official identification document. Before her post-prison arrival in the United States, Grau had the name of Maria Aguero which was taken from her second husband. After Polita became a U.S. citizen, she had adopted a new name of "Pola Grau" which was the name on her naturalization certificate.

== Four periods of exile ==
=== First exile ===
In 1931, Grau San Martín and the Grau Alsina family went into exile in Miami, Florida. Once they had arrived in Miami, they joined other Cubans who opposed the Machado government. When Machado was removed from Cuba in 1933, the Grau Alsina family had gone back to Cuba, which was when Polita's uncle became president of Cuba.

=== Second exile ===
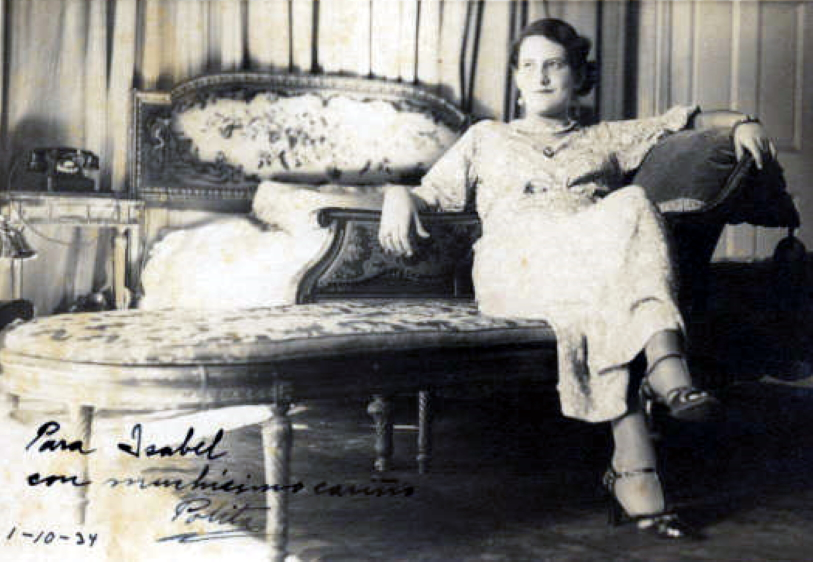
Polita Grau on January 10, 1934

Grau's family had gone again into exile in 1933, but this second time around was to Mexico and later on in Miami. In 1934, Polita had returned to Cuba after she had gone to exile and married Roberto (Pepe) Lago who was a leader of a student movement.

=== Third exile ===
Polita was exiled for the third time in 1935 to Miami due to her political involvement along with her husband Roberto Lago (Pepe).

=== Fourth exile ===
In 1952, Batista organized his ‘coup d’etat’ and established his dictatorship; Polita Grau joined the resistance to him. Polita left Cuba to join Antonio Varona, who played a significant role in the anti-Batista movement. Antonio Varona was an exiled politician and associate of her uncle in Miami. Polita Grau had stayed in Miami for five months after the dictator's overthrow as she was doubtful of the movies of Batista's successor. Polita Grau was also frightened by Castro's belief in Communism, therefore became a part of an underground movement that planned to overthrow the Cuban government. Varona had a counter-revolutionary group, that Polita had later joined famously known as "Movimiento de Rescate Revolucionario (Revolutionary Rescue Movement). This group had to find a safe place for underground operatives to attempt the assassination of Fidel Castro. Since Polita was a women’s coordinator, she was able to create a spy ring that was able to see Cuba in its entirety. When Polita Grau and her brother Ramón Grau arrived in Miami, they were received by many who admired her, particularly for assisting in bringing thousands of children out of Cuba through Operation Pedro Pan. Ramón Grau was asked by a Miami Herald journalist Sergio López about the patria potestad scare in which he confessed: “The entire thing was a propaganda test to hurt Fidel. . . The idea was to create panic [among Cuban parents]. . . . It was hoped that this would foster unrest and rebellion against him. Polita Grau was exiled for her last time due to her political involvement until 1959, which was when Castro rose to power. Polita's exiles did not stop her from doing what she believed was morally correct.

== Politics ==
Ms. Grau and her brother, Ramon Grau Alsina, were children of parents who feared for their Communist indoctrination and were involved in the anti-Castro resistance. During her adolescent years, Grau was majorly involved in politics which resulted in her spending many of her later years in exile. Dr. Ramon Grau San Martin (Polita's uncle) had given her the title of being "The First Lady of Cuba," at only seventeen years old in 1933. Throughout her life, she opposed the Machado regime and the Batista regimes. In 1952, Fulgencio Batista led another 'coup de etat,' Polita took this opportunity and became actively involved in the opposition led by Prío Socarrás. In the beginning, Polita supported the Cuban Revolution, but after obtaining more knowledge she opposed the Castro regime.

Later in her life, Polita Grau had gone to the White House more than once to be interviewed with former President George W. Bush. Ms. Grau had gone to ask for help, specifically for her brother Ramon Grau, to be able to migrate to the United States from Cuba.

== Involvement of Operation Peter Pan ==
Polita was engaged in attempts that were unsuccessful against the life of Fidel Castro which included Operation Peter Pan. In 1961 it was the year where Polita Grau first caught the attention of the Operation when a group of women possibly sent by Penny Powers had gone towards her brother's involvement in Operation Pedro Pan. Mongo (Polita's brother) had agreed to helping out as well as Polita who was actively handing out exit papers and airline tickets. With the use of her Rescate network, Ms. Grau was able to be successful in completing what many families wanted. Grau had her entire women's group join the efforts of the Operation which increased the number of people involved. Most of these women had already sent their children out of Cuba in hopes that the Catholic Church and the U.S government would take care of their children properly. Each woman from the Graus organization had a specific task to accomplish during this operation, such as distributing documents to children. The Grau organization began to expand and was eventually all across Cuba and even outside of Havana. Every one of these women engaged in Grau's organization had the same intention which was to save the children in Cuba from Communism. Their main goal as an organization was to save the children, as well as participating in other activities. Polita had later stated that all of these activities were being executed under the help of the CIA.

Polita and her brother had created a secret network to perform their underground activities in hopes of not getting caught. Both of them had created a public front of a "socially active family" which enabled them to hide the people that were coming in and out of their home. Polita remembered that people would come to their home in Miramar, Florida which was coincidentally right next to the office of the security police. The process of the counterfeiting operation was to first, have the people pass an interview and if they passed it, they would receive either passports, visas, or visa waivers. The people that would get a passport would receive a fake passport fabricated in concurrence with the Panamanian Embassy. People who had valid passports, but outdated visas would have the date on the visa changed by an artist who was close to Polita. Lastly, the people with valid passports and without visas were able to get one stamped with the official embassy stamp that was handed out earlier on to the Graus through their connection with the CIA. The U.S visas that were being distributed were valid for a maximum of four years.

In 1961, Grau and her brother Ramon, along with Monsignor Bryan O. Walsh of the Archdiocese of Miami, started Operation Peter Pan. From 1961 to 1965, they helped more than 14,000 children leave Cuba without their parents, and later assisted with giving out 28,000 visas to those children's parents. This was able to be accomplished by "secretly distributing U.S letterhead invitations" from their home in Havana, Cuba. Grau had also sent her daughter and son to Miami to stay along with her friends as she stayed in Cuba to take care of her elderly relatives. Polita Grau gave shelter to multiple anti-government activists and had also assisted them to obtain political asylum in Havana.

Due to Polita's popularity, former politicians from the provinces who were connected with her uncle's political party had asked her for the documents. She had also gotten several other requests from people she knew such as priests and nuns who wanted to help children in their schools and congregations. The Cuban Baptist Church had also held several visa waivers for her to maintain. Despite Ms. Grau being well recognized, she struggled at times in finding spaces aboard airplanes for children. However, she used her friend, Juanita Castro, Fidel Castro's sister who was against her brother, for her connections at Havana's airport. Polita and her brother's involvement had perfect timing during Operation Pedro Pan. This is because after the Bay of Pigs invasion of April 1961, several underground networks had fallen, and many were arrested by the government or forced to leave Cuba. Once Polita and her brother had gotten arrested in 1965, they had realized that not even their family name or the government's need to keep their uncle in Cuba could save them from being released.

Polita Grau was the President of the Cuban Chapter of the Red Cross, while also being the coordinator of the women's counter-revolutionary action organization called 'Rescate' (Rescue). As Polita was directing Rescate, the women of her network were in charge of giving the CIA information on Soviet missiles and responsible for those who were spying underground outside of the country. Rescate was engaged in a comprehensive propaganda campaign that wanted to discontent particularly the middle class from the Cuban revolution. Rescate had worked along with CIA-backed activities such as Radio Sawn, in which Rescate distributed leaflets that had anti-government writings. A consequential activity that began to cause panic among the citizens was to spread the rumor that the Cuban government was going to remove legal parental authority. This specific rumor was mentioned in 1961, and once again in the late 1960s. They had traveled across Cuba to distribute copies of the law that was not true but people were convinced it was to churches and other places. They had also used telephones as a method of spreading misinformation by calling people and explaining the law as a whole. Polita Grau and her brother Ramon Grau had distributed thousands of visa waivers right after the Bay of Pigs invasion.

== Imprisonment ==
In 1965, Grau and her brother Ramón were accused of being CIA spies (Polita: AMCOG-2; Ramón: AMCOG-1) because of their work of helping thousands of children to leave Cuba under Castro's regime in Operation Peter Pan. She was also accused of participating in a plan to poison Castro by giving him a milkshake, however, their plan was unsuccessful. They were both tried, and were sentenced to 30 years in prison, particularly for their connections with the CIA, espionage, and attempting to overthrow the Castro government. Despite being convicted for their role in Pedro Pan and had dealt with the Central Intelligence Agency, they had denied their connection to this.

Before being released from prison in 1978, Polita Grau was interviewed by a Cuban journalist Luis Báez, who questioned her about the supposed threat to ‘patria potestad,’ which means 'taking away legal custody of your child.' She had admitted to having "encouraged the rumor that the communist government was the absolute owner of the muchachos [kids] and that parents would lose their rights over their children that "they would be sent to Russia." Ms. Grau further explained that a false revolutionary government law relating to this topic was being printed out. In one of Polita's interviews, Polita Grau had mentioned that she did not believe it was entirely right but that she felt she had to do something to undermine the government. Polita believed that by doing so, the people would start their faith and hopes in the revolution. Grau was released after almost serving 14 years in prison, and her brother Ramon also known as "Mongo" Grau was released after serving 21 years. She was released during the "wider release of political prisoners in 1978 dialogue between exiles and Castro, due to Bernardo Benes influences." Bernado at that time was a Miami businessman who described Polita Grau as being a brave woman who was not afraid of anything. Ms. Grau was also freed due to the encouragement of President Jimmy Carter who had convinced Castro to release a significant number of political prisoners in Cuba. Her brother Ramon was later released in September 1986.

While Grau was in prison, she wrote a significant amount of her involvement in Operation Peter Pan. It was only from her writing that the Cuban government finally was able to realize the extent of the Operation. Grau had described Operation Peter Pan as 'child abuse' and that the Federal government of the United States's participation was inhumane. Grau referred to the U.S acting inhumanely in the 1980s where the State Department denied a request from the United Nations High Commissioner for Refugees to assist in reuniting Cuban children with their parents.

== Life in Diaspora ==
After Polita had been imprisoned for 14 years, she wanted to reunite with her family but was unable to forget about the prisoners that she left behind in Cuba. Polita was determined to fight for the political prisoners. The only way that Polita can be calm is to see the political prisoners free from prison in Cuba. However, she says that it is a miracle that she is out of prison and that she feels resurrected. Polita was excited to see her husband, José Agüero, and her children that she hasn't seen for 18 years. Polita Grau had six grandchildren who she has never met before in her life. Polita's son had arrived in Miami days after his mother's arrival to attempt to obtain liberty for his mother in Cuba.

== Death and legacy ==
After Grau's exile in 1978, until her time of death, Grau had not given up on her political activities against Castro's regime. According to her daughter Hilda "Chury" Aguero, Grau had failing health years prior to her death. At the age of 84, Polita Grau died at the Villa Maria Nursing Center located on the grounds of Mercy Hospital in Coconut Grove, of congestive heart disease. Visitation was held at Rivero Funeral Home, 8200 Bird Road in Miami, Florida. While the mass was held at St. Dominic's Catholic Church, 5909 NW Seventh St, in Miami, Florida. There was no cemetery service for Polita Grau, as she preferred to have a cremation and have her ashes buried in Cuba.

Polita Grau was published in multiple newspapers and was highly spoken of for her accomplished work. She was viewed as a symbol of ‘decorum,’ of the highest moral rank of Cuban women. She is remembered for her ‘beauty, her sweetness, her generosity of care, her integrity.’ Grau is well respected for her political involvement, particularly in Cuba and Miami. So much that, in 2008, the City of Miami named a street after her: "Ramon and Polita Grau-Alsina Avenue," in honor of Polita and her brother's work.

== Gallery ==
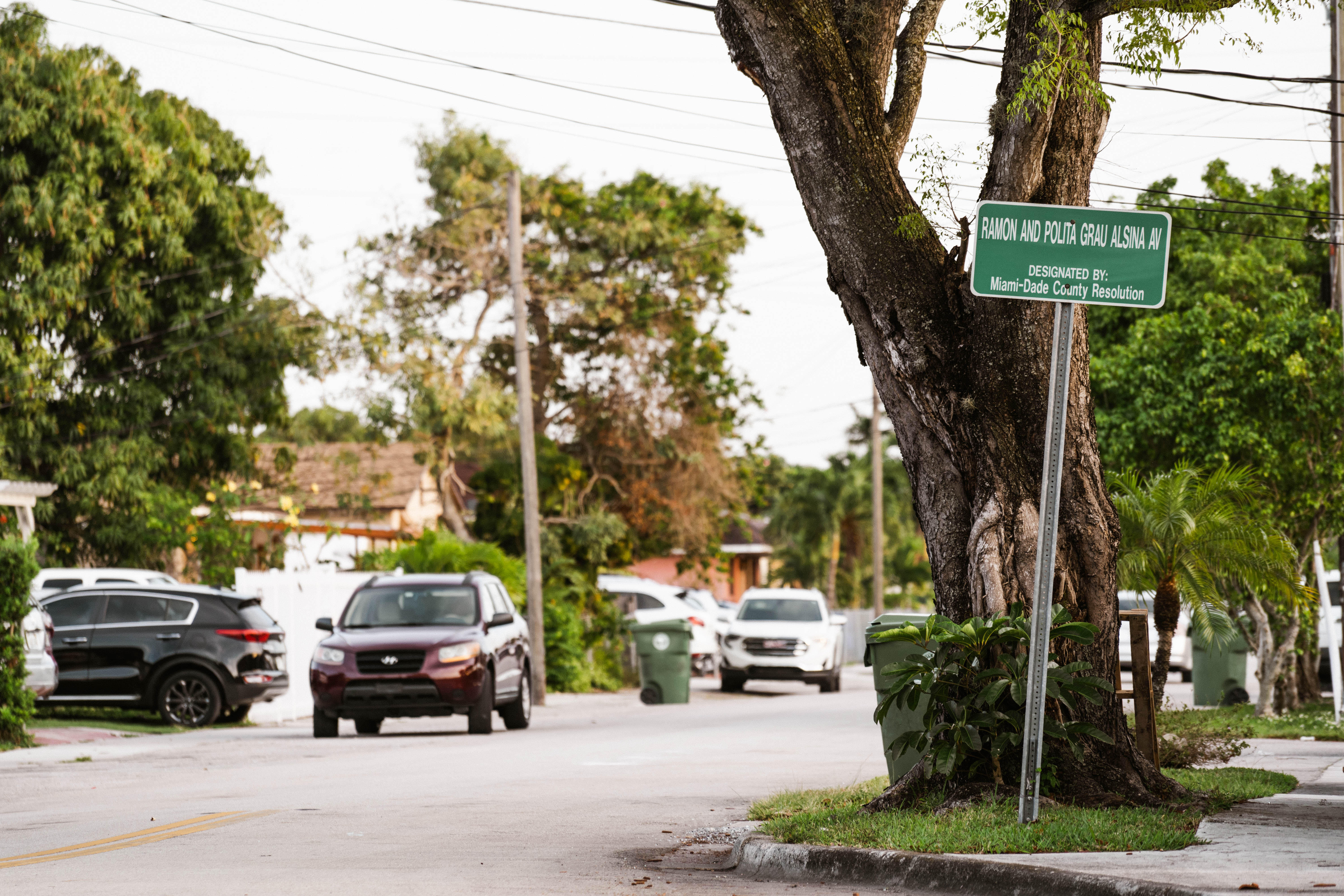
59 NW 7th St.

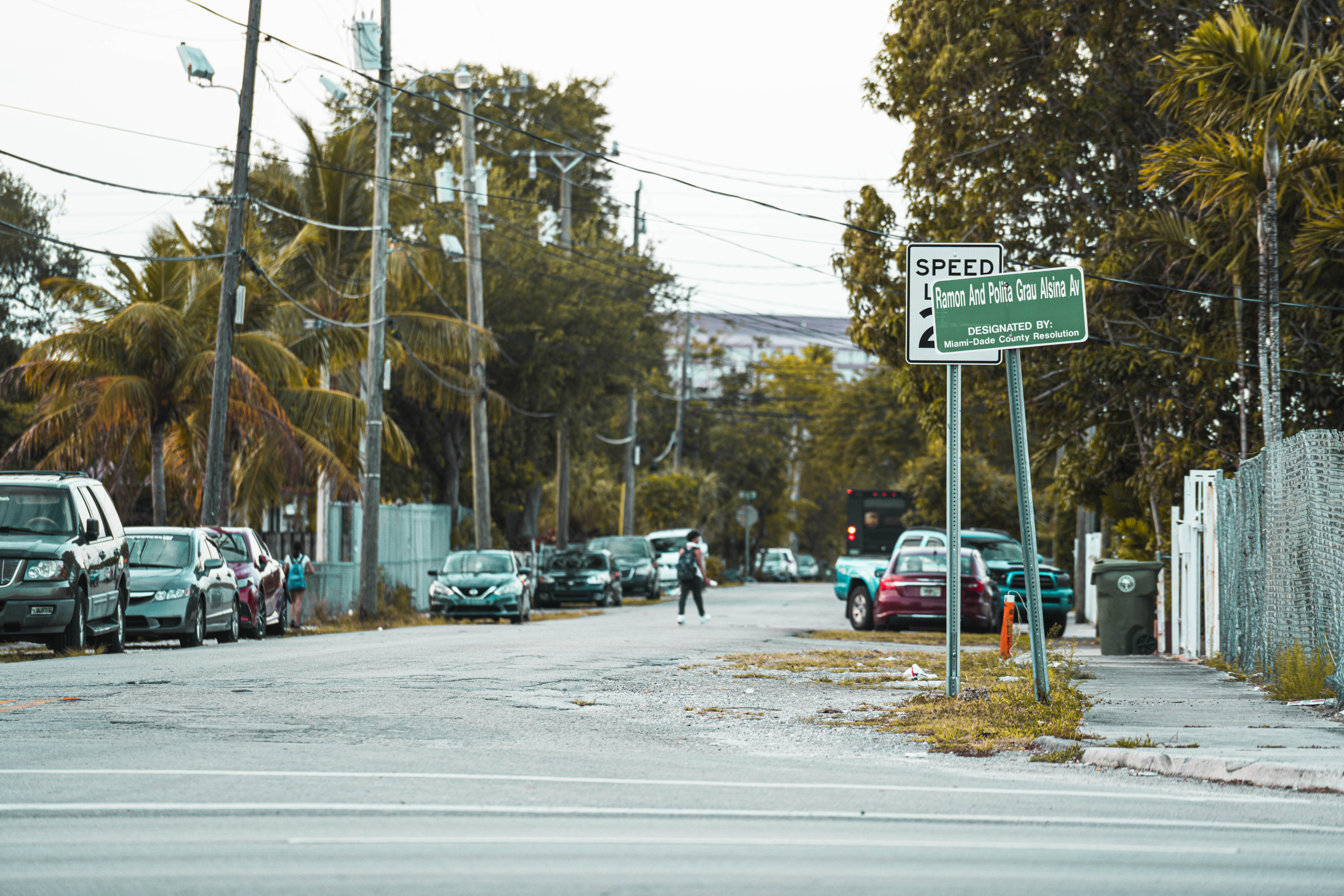
59 NW Flager St.

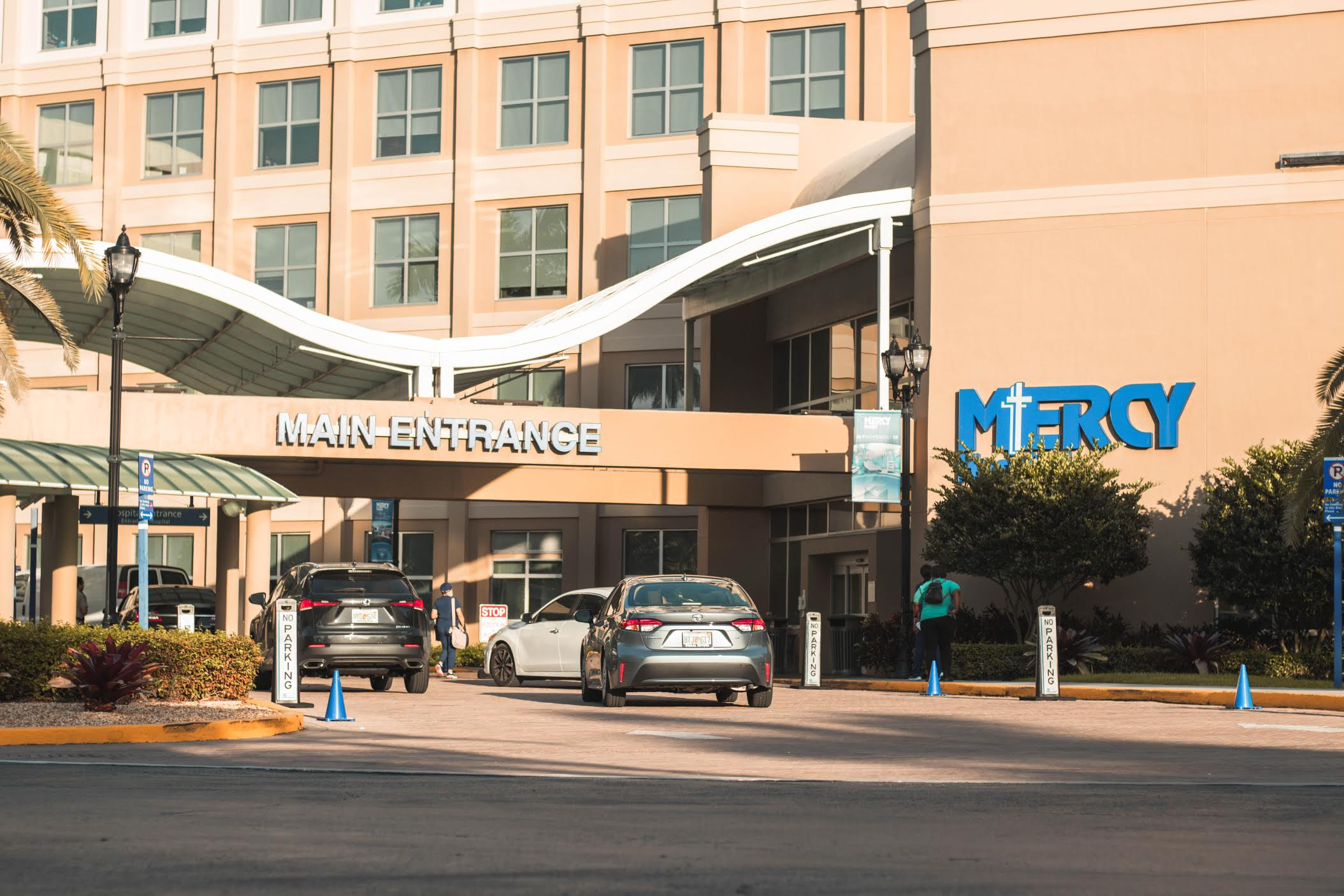
Mercy Hospital in Coconut Grove, Florida

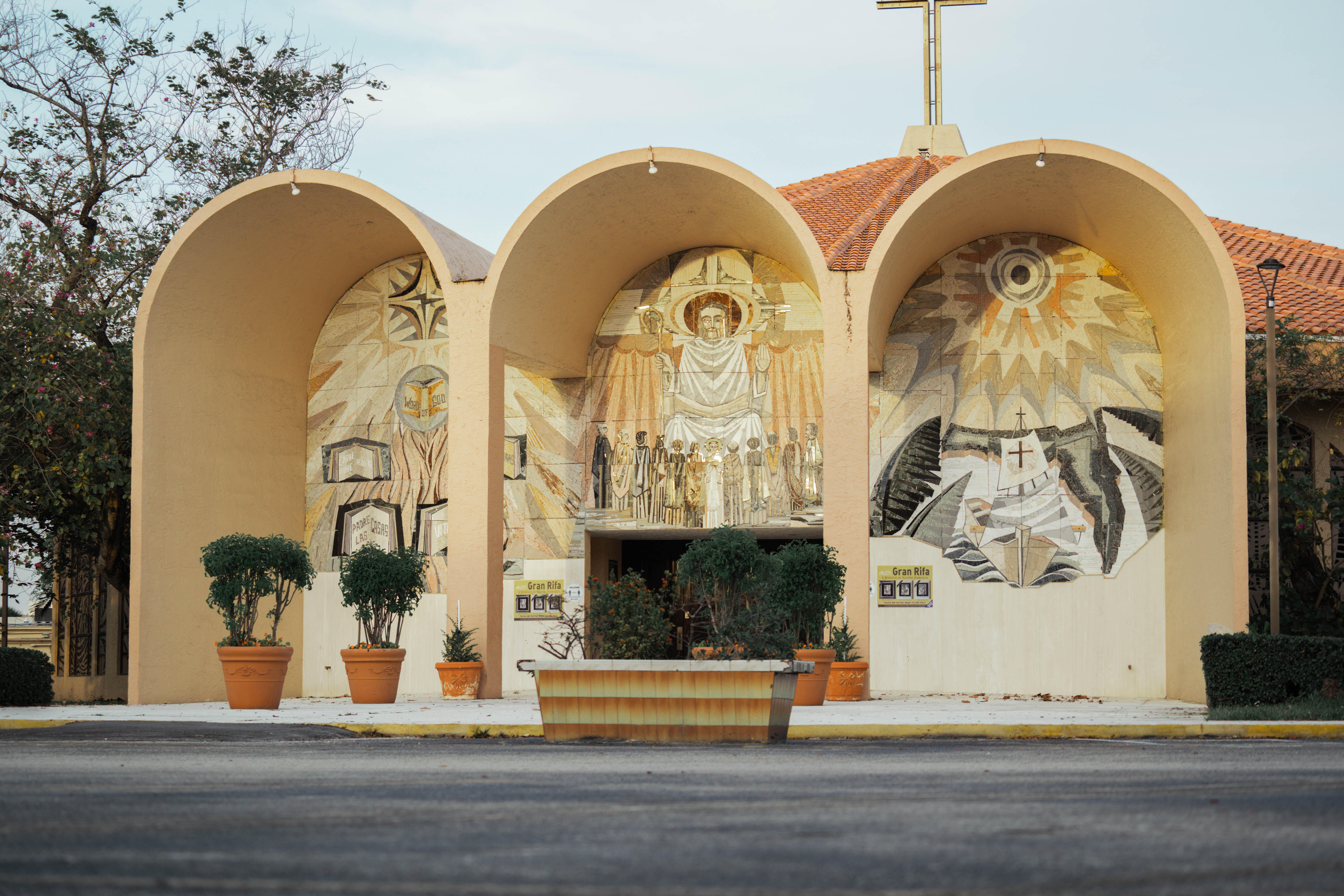
Dominic's Catholic Church, 5909 NW Seventh St. Miami, Florida

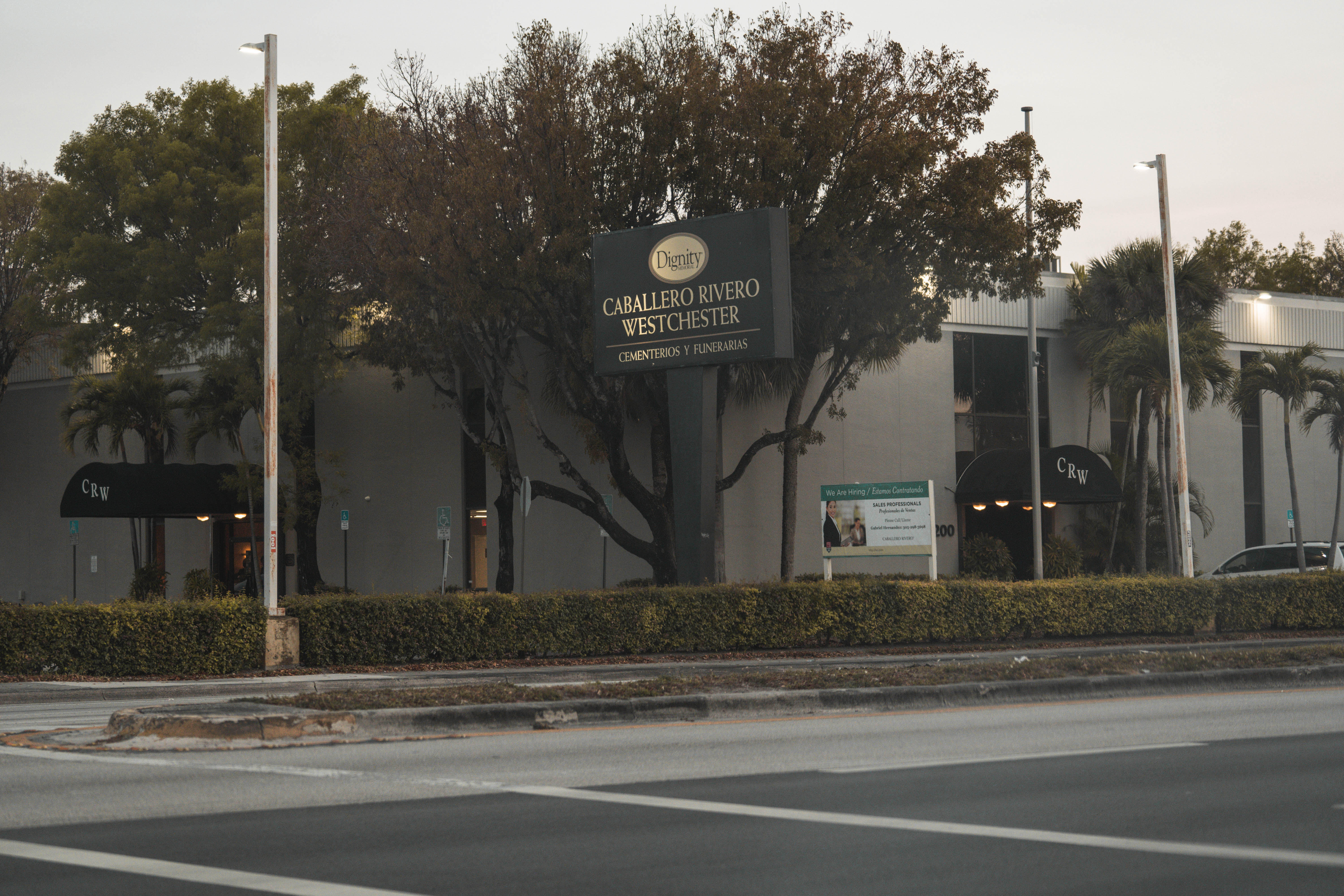
Rivero Funeral Home, 8200 Bird Road, Miami, Florida

== See also ==
- Ramón Grau
- Partido Auténtico
- Cuban diaspora
- Cuban migration to Miami
- Opposition to Fidel Castro
- Cuba–United States relations
