= Waiting for Snow in Havana =

Autobiography

- First edition
- Author: Carlos Eire
- Subject: Cuba, Cuban Americans, Refugee children, Operation Peter Pan
- Publisher: Free Press
- Publication date: 2003
- Media type: Print
- Pages: 383
- Awards: National Book Award for Nonfiction
- ISBN: 0-74321-965-1
- OCLC: 50155574
- Dewey Decimal: 972.9123063092
- LC Class: E184.C97

Waiting for Snow in Havana: Confessions of a Cuban Boy is a 2003 book by Carlos Eire and winner of the National Book Award for Nonfiction. The book is autobiographical, about the author's childhood during the Cuban Revolution and his experiences as part of Operation Peter Pan.

== Author ==
Professor Eire, who received his PhD from Yale University in 1979, is the T. L. Riggs Professor of History and Religious Studies at Yale University. He is a historian of late medieval and early modern Europe who focuses on the Protestant and Catholic Reformations; the history of popular piety, the history of the supernatural, and the history of death. Before joining the Yale faculty in 1996, he taught at St. John’s University in Minnesota and the University of Virginia and was a member of the Institute for Advanced Study in Princeton . He is the author of War Against the Idols (1986); From Madrid to Purgatory (1995); A Very Brief History of Eternity (2010); Reformations: The Early Modern World (2016); The Life of Saint Teresa of Avila (2019); and They Flew: A History of the Impossible (2023). In 2003 he won the National Book Award in Nonfiction for his first memoir, Waiting for Snow in Havana (2003), which has been translated into more than a dozen languages. His second memoir, Learning to Die in Miami (2010), explores his early years in exile. His book Reformations won the R. R. Hawkins Prize for Best Book of the Year from the American Publishers Association, as well as the award for Best Book in the Humanities. It was also awarded the Jaroslav Pelikan Prize by Yale University Press. His most recent book, They Flew, was awarded the prize for Best Book in the History of Religion by the American Academy of Religion. All of his writings are banned in Cuba, where he has been proclaimed an enemy of the state—a distinction he regards as the highest of all honors.

== Reception ==
Waiting for Snow in Havana was chosen as the Philadelphia One Book, by Mayor of Philadelphia John F. Street, who said:

"In 1962, Carlos Eire was one of 14,000 children airlifted out of Cuba-exiled from his family, his country, and his own childhood by the revolution. The memories of Carlos's life in Havana, cut short when he was just eleven years old, are the heart of this stunning, evocative, and unforgettable memoir. Waiting for Snow in Havana is both an exorcism and an ode to a paradise lost. For the Cuba of Carlos's youth-with its lizards and turquoise seas and sun-drenched siestas- becomes an island of condemnation once a cigar-smoking guerrilla named Fidel Castro ousts President Batista on January 1, 1959. Suddenly the music in the streets sounds like gunfire. Christmas is made illegal, political dissent leads to imprisonment, and too many of Carlos's friends are leaving Cuba for a place as far away and unthinkable as the United States. Carlos will end up there, too, and fulfill his mother's dreams by becoming a modern American man- even if his soul remains in the country he left behind. Narrated with the urgency of a confession, Waiting for Snow in Havana is a eulogy for a native land and a loving testament to the collective spirit of Cubans everywhere."

== Awards and honors ==
- 2003 National Book Award for Nonfiction
- 2007 One Book, One Philadelphia
- 2016 One Book, One San Diego
