= Operation Peter Pan =

1960–62 evacuation of Cuban children to the US

- Part of the Golden exile
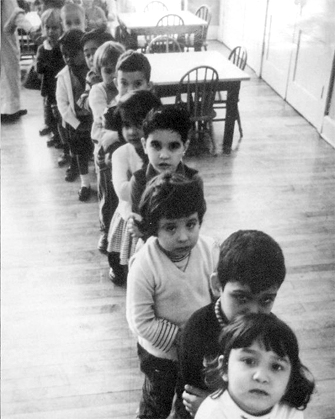
- Cuban children waiting in line to emigrate.
- Date: 1960–1962
- Location: Cuba
- Cause: Education in Cuba: Closing of private schools; Cuban literacy campaign; Studies in the Soviet Union; Youth camps; Opposition to Fidel Castro
- Outcome: 14,000 unaccompanied minors arrive in the United States

Operation Peter Pan (Spanish: Operación Pedro Pan) was a politicized exodus of over 14,000 unaccompanied Cuban minors ages 6 to 18 to the United States over a two-year span from 1960 to 1962. They were sent by parents who feared Fidel Castro and the Communist Party were planning to terminate parents' legal custody (or "patria potestad", in Spanish) of their children, and place minors in rumored communist indoctrination centers. No such actions by the Castro regime ever took place, but the rumors were fueled by actions such as Castro taking over control of private schooling in 1961.

The program consisted of two main components: the mass transportation of Cuban children via airplane to the United States – Miami as a particularly common hub – and the programs set up to care for them once they arrived. Both were led by Father Bryan O. Walsh of the Catholic Welfare Bureau. The operation was the largest exodus of minor refugees in the Western Hemisphere at the time. The evacuations were operated covertly out of fear they would be viewed as an anti-Castro political enterprise.

== Origins ==
=== Aftermath of the Cuban Revolution ===
Following the Cuban Revolution of 1959, but more importantly after the regime's October 1960 move to nationalize industries, the first wave of Cuban immigrants left for the United States. These upper and upper-middle classes were not tied to Batista's government, most of whom had earlier departed Cuba. This first wave had economic livelihoods they believed were incompatible with the regime's goals. Most, if not all, thought it to be a temporary departure, imagining a life where they would return to Cuba once another regime came to power in the country.

An additional wave of Cubans left upon the failure of the Bay of Pigs Invasion in April 1961, and after the announcement by Castro he was a Marxist-Leninist in December 1961. Also in late 1961, the Castro government took control of private schools, which led to fears education would be politicized.

These proclamation of a new social-economic order sparked more departures from those who had elected to wait and see how Castro's leadership developed. This third wave of Cuban immigrants was predominantly middle class. This wave of Cuban immigrants included merchants and management, landlords, mid-level professionals and a significant representation of skilled unionized workers.

=== Parental fears ===
By 1960, the Cuban government began reforming education strategies. School children were taught military drills, how to bear arms, and anti-American songs. By 1961, the Cuban government would seize control of all private schools.

As a result of the new social order, rumors began to swirl, originating from both inside the United States and other anti-Castro media. Various outlets, including the Miami Herald and Time, reported rumors Castro and his followers intended to terminate parental rights, assume custody of all Cuban children, prohibit religion and indoctrinate them into communism. Historian Deborah Shooknal describes patria potested as a hoax, saying the false law was first circulated in Cuba by anti-Castro groups and Catholics before being amplified by Radio Swan and other sources. The CIA-backed Radio Swan station asserted the Cuban government was planning to remove children from their parents and send them to the Soviet Union. These claims lacked firm corroborative evidence, but denials fell on deaf ears.

These rumors, combined with the pre-existing worry instilled by the Spanish Civil War (during which children were evacuated to other countries), made the patria potestad rumors impossible to contain.

It had already reached the Catholic Church and the general public, and opponents of the now openly communist regime who did not migrate during the first wave of the exodus began sending their children off to perceived safety.

=== Organizing an exodus ===
Having been involved in a similar program that gained young Hungarians entrance to the US following Soviet repression of the 1956 uprising, Father Bryan O. Walsh of the Catholic Welfare Bureau, with the help of the U.S. government, developed the Cuban Children's Program in late 1960. Key players included Tracy Voorhees, Eisenhower Administration, James Baker, Father Walsh, and in Cuba Polita Grau and her brother Ramón Grau Alsina.

An October meeting brought the influx of Cuban refugees in Miami to the attention of the White House, with particular focus on what appeared to be a high number of unaccompanied minors wandering the city. Shortly after, Tracy Voorhees – a veteran U.S. government official who was serving as the president's Personal Representative for Cuban Refugees – reported that, though the issue was not large in number, it had still been highly publicized and, therefore, the administration needed to be seen taking action.

Up until that time, the Catholic church had been the largest provider of aid. But, towards the end of 1960, President Eisenhower approved $1 million to help, with specific funds allocated to the creation of a Cuban emergency refugee center. To further their efforts, and ultimately further the smear campaign of Castro's Cuba, Voorhees recommended the administration further their involvement, this time taking specific interest in caring for the Cuban refugee children.

Simultaneously, James Baker (headmaster of an American school in Havana) met with Walsh (who was already invested in helping already arrived child refugees settle into their new life) to detail his efforts helping parents send their children to Miami. Baker's original goal was to establish a boarding school in the United States for Cuban refugee children. However, both later agreed professional social welfare agencies would be better equipped for the job. The Catholic Welfare Bureau, the Children's Services Bureau and Jewish Family and Children's Services were the agencies that ultimately agreed to care for the refugee children. Thus, in November 1960, they appealed for federal funding, and, following the earlier recommendation from Voorhees, it was granted.

== Operations ==
=== Emigration ===
By January 1961, 6,500 Cuban children were enrolled in Miami and Miami-adjacent schools. By September 1962, that number had jumped to 19,000. And while Pedro Pans are often depicted as babies, infants or elementary-school-aged children, most of them were actually teenaged boys.

A lack of limitations placed on how many were admitted coupled with federally-funded foster care caused the Cuban Children's Program to continue to grow and get more complex. In January 1961, the U.S. embassy of Cuba closed, but Operation Peter Pan persisted. Instead of visas, children received waivers in the form of simple letters signed by Walsh effectively gaining them entrance into the country. Airlines were instructed to accept these letters as official documents and, as an added incentive, the U.S. government covered the cost of flights.

From there, things continued to spiral. In September of that year, the State Department began allowing Cuban child refugees to apply for visa waivers on behalf of their parents. For many who could not otherwise afford it or did not already have other relatives in the United States, this became a fairly regular means of familial immigration.

=== Funding ===
By late 1960, Castro had expropriated several companies that made up the American Chamber of Commerce in Havana, including Esso Standard Oil Company and Freeport Sulfur Company. The leaders of these companies moved to Miami while they analyzed the actions of Cuba's new government. Under the impression that Castro's rule would be brief, they agreed to aid the Cuban children by providing funding for Operation Peter Pan. Through collaborations with Baker, these business leaders agreed to help secure donations from multiple US businesses and send them to Cuba.

Because Castro was supervising all major monetary transactions, the businessmen were very careful in how the funds were transferred. Some donations were sent to the Catholic Welfare Bureau and others were written out as checks to citizens living in Miami. These individuals then wrote checks out to the W. Henry Smith Travel Agency in Havana, which helped fund the children's flights to the United States. It was necessary to send the funds in American currency because Castro had ruled that plane tickets could not be purchased with Cuban pesos.

=== Housing ===
As the need for shelters grew as the children arrived in increasing numbers, several prominent locations were converted to house them, including Camp Matecumbe, the Opa-locka Airport Marine barracks. Special homes, authorized by state officials and operated by Cuban refugees, were formed in several hundred cities including Albuquerque, New Mexico; Lincoln, Nebraska; Wilmington, Delaware; Fort Wayne, Indiana; Jacksonville and Orlando, Florida.

Many children were placed in foster care, some were placed in positive living environments and others endured emotional and physical neglect. Laws prevented any relocated children from being housed in reform schools or centers for juvenile delinquents. Further, the minors were not made available for adoption.

=== End ===
The Cuban Children's Program remained a secret until February 1962, when The Plain Dealer introduced its readers to the masses of unaccompanied Cuban minors who made their way across the country for three years unnoticed. On March 9 of the same year, the Miami Herald's Gene Miller also ran a story about the event, in which he coined the term Operation Pedro Pan.

The American portion of Operation Peter Pan ended when all air traffic between the United States and Cuba ceased in the aftermath of the Cuban Missile Crisis of October 1962. Cuban immigrants were instead re-routed to Spain and other countries following the Cuban Missile Crisis, and Cuban immigrants would have to travel via Spain or Mexico to reach the United States until 1965.

In December of 1965, the United States established a program of Freedom Flights (los vuelos de la libertad) to unite Cuban parents with their children. The Catholic Welfare Bureau reported that, once the Freedom Flights began, nearly 90% of the minors still in its care were reunited with their parents.

Remnants of the program would continue up until 1981. An estimate of 25,000 children were affected by the program.

== Legacy ==
=== Film ===
Nearing the end of this mass-exodus of children to the United States, Attorney General Robert F. Kennedy approved funding for a propaganda film designed to assist migrant children's understanding of why their parents had made this choice on their behalf. This film elaborates on the many things for children to do within their current situation, including but not limited to learning, playing, and attending religious ceremonies. However, this film is careful to not mention the current events in Cuba. The film was directed by Cliff Solway, a Canadian director for CBC.

Titled The Lost Apple, the (approximately) thirty-minute short film follows the life of Roberto and two other young children inside the Florida City Camp that was one of the main offloading sites for children. The film was produced by the United States Information Agency. Narrated by Carlos Montalbán, the short film explains to young Cuban children how and why they are in the United States. The narrator explains that camps such as the Florida City Camp is only a temporary place for the children to stay, as they are meant to find other opportunities through scholarships or be housed with foster parents.

=== Museums ===
The American Museum of The Cuban Diaspora (shortened to The Cuban) hosted an installation recounting Operation Peter Pan for its 60th anniversary in 2021. The museum is located in Miami, Florida and was founded in 2004. The Cuban, working directly with Operation Pedro Pan Group, Inc. (OPPG), expanded on OPPG's 2015 exhibit by adding documents, objects, and images loaned by the historical committee of the organization.

=== Pedro Pan children ===
Many Pedro Pans had trouble assimilating into American society. Many were sent to the United States on the instruction of their parents and felt alienated both from their homeland and their new home. Some found the United States an unwelcoming place gripped by racial segregation.

Those who felt uncomfortable in American society often participated in the growing Civil rights movement and anti-war movement, adopted the traits of the growing youth counterculture, or rejected the ideology of their parents. Many would desire to return to Cuba. In the same way, some others found professional success, and went on to become notable people. One of such examples is Maximo Alvarez, founder of the fuel distribution chain Sunshine Gasoline Distribution inc., who emigrated to the United States as a Pedro Pan child in 1961, at the age of 13. In 1961, thirteen-year-old Ana Mendieta, who would become a well-known multimedia and performance artist, emigrated to the United States with her older sister.

Some Pedro Pan children would involve themselves in the Abdala organization, an organization of Cuban-American students dedicated to protesting the Cuban government and promoting Cuban-American pride.

Other Pedro Pan children would adopt leftist sympathies after becoming involved in social movements in the United States. In 1977, some Pedro Pan emigrants joined the Antonio Maceo Brigade that sympathized with the Cuban government and supported Cuban exiles' travel to Cuba. The brigade would make the first trip of Cuban exiles to Cuba.

==== Pedro Pan Children by the Numbers ====
A study from Yale University investigated if the Pedro Pan population shows persistent differences in their physical and mental health, and attachment secondary to childhood separation from their family. These participants were compared against a control sample of Cuban immigrants who had traveled with their families to the US at the same time as the Pedro Pan children. 102 adults who were involved in the Operation Pedro Pan exodus participated in this study.

Within the survey, it was reported that no significant differences were found between the Pedro Pan group and the control group. However, the result of the study can be interpreted in many different ways. Since both groups were part of a larger exile, they could have similar mindsets about their familial ties and feelings towards the earlier time period.

=== Conflicting narratives ===
The United States government may have had other than humanitarian motives for allowing Cuban migration. The emigration of Cuba's middle class undermined its economic situation through a "brain drain". Stories of abandoned Pedro Pans deepened Anti-Castro sentiment within the Americas, connecting the rise of Communism and the separation of families.

In 1978, El Grupo Areito and Casa de las Américas collaborated to publish "Contra viento y marea", a book of anonymous testimonies detailing alienation from both the Cuban community from which they fled and the American community to which they came. A direct contrast to the previous happy-go-lucky stories of Operation Pedro Pan, these accounts told stories of loneliness, poor conditions and mental, physical and sexual abuse.

=== Controversy over CIA involvement ===
An ongoing political controversy developed around charges that Operation Peter Pan was not an effort of volunteers and charitable organization, but had been secretly funded by the U.S. government as a covert operation of the Central Intelligence Agency. Author Maria de los Angeles Torres filed a Freedom of Information Act suit to obtain government files on the program. In 1999, a ruling by the U.S. District Court for Northern Illinois determined that this "evacuation of Cuban children turned out not to be a CIA operation at all". The ruling was based in part on the court's review of 733 pages of documentation provided by the CIA for use in an earlier lawsuit. Despite this, several former CIA agents have admitted to editing, printing and distributing copies of a fabricated Patria Potestad law that stated the revolutionary government was about to abolish parental rights. This, along with fake news about threats to the Cuban family broadcast on CIA-operated Radio Swan, helped fuel the exodus of unaccompanied children.

== Participants in Operation Peter Pan ==
Unaccompanied Cuban minors, known at the time as "Pedro Pans" or "Peter Pans", who participated in the operation include:

- Eduardo Aguirre, United States Ambassador to Spain (2005–2009)
- Frank Angones, attorney
- Fred Beato, musician and business owner.
- Carlos Mayans, politician
- Willy Chirino, musician
- Carlos Eire, historian
- Felipe de Jesus Estevez, religious leader
- Mario Garcia, newspaper designer and media consultant
- Hugo Llorens, ambasador
- Ana Mendieta, artist
- Guillermo "Bill" Vidal, politician
- Miguel Bezos, businessman and stepfather of Jeff Bezos
- Mel Martinez, politician
- Lissette Alvarez, singer-songwriter
- Eduardo J. Padrón, academic
- Demetrio Perez Jr., publisher

== In culture ==
Operation Peter Pan is recounted in:

- Waiting for Snow in Havana, in which Carlos Eire describes his experiences during Operation Peter Pan
- From Cuba with Love - The Story of a Peter Pan Kid, a play by Manuel Prestamo about his life as a Peter Pan Kid.
- Learning to Die in Miami, another memoir by Carlos Eire about his emigration to the United States from Havana
- Operation Pedro Pan: The Untold Exodus of 14,048 Cuban Children, based on the research and interviews of Yvonne M. Conde
- The Red Umbrella, a young-adult historical fiction novel by Christina Diaz Gonzalez, based on her mother's exile from Cuba as a teenager
- Cuba on My Mind: Journeys to a Severed Nation, an exploration of Havana, Miami, and the "one-and-half-generation" by Román de la Campa
- Boxing For Cuba, a 2007 memoir by Bill Vidal, civil servant and mayor of Denver
- "Operation Peter Pan", a song written by Tori Amos originally on the B-side to the limited edition release of her single "A Sorta Fairytale"
- The operation is the main influence behind the Manic Street Preachers song "Baby Elián", the penultimate track from the band's sixth studio album, Know Your Enemy.
- On the 2017 Netflix Original Series One Day at a Time, Lydia Riera, played by Rita Moreno, the grandmother on the show, moved to the US via Pedro Pan.
- The Play Sonia Flew by Melinda Lopez with the main character is a Pedro Pan child
- Black Pedro Pan, Ricardo E. Gonzalez Zayas memoir which recounts his experience as a 13 year old Afro-Cuban refugee who participated in Operation Peter Pan.

== See also ==
- Cuban migration to Miami
- Cuban American
- Cuban exile
- Mariel boatlift
- Opposition to Fidel Castro
- Operation Baby Lift (South Vietnam, 1975)
- Polita Grau
