= Free Press (publisher) =

American independent book publisher and later imprint (1947–2012)

- Parent company: Simon & Schuster
- Founded: 1947
- Founder: Jeremiah Kaplan; Charles Liebman
- Defunct: 2012
- Successor: Simon & Schuster
- Country of origin: United States
- Headquarters location: New York City, New York, U.S.
- Key people: Martha K. Levin, publisher
- Fiction genres: Fiction, non-fiction

Free Press was an American independent book publisher that later became an imprint of Simon & Schuster. It was one of the best-known publishers specializing in serious nonfiction, including path-breaking sociology books of the 1950s, 1960s and 1970s. After a period under new ownership in the 1980s of publishing neoconservative books, it was purchased by Simon & Schuster in 1994. By 2012, the imprint ceased to exist as a distinct entity; however, some books were still being published using the Free Press imprint.

== History ==
Free Press was founded by Jeremiah Kaplan (1926–1993) and Charles Liebman in 1947 and concentrated on religion and social science. They chose the name Free Press because they wanted to print books devoted to civil liberties. It was launched with three titles: Division of Labor by Emile Durkheim, The Theory of Economic and Social Organization by Max Weber and The Scientific Outlook by Bertrand Russell. It was headquartered in Glencoe, Illinois, where it was known as The Free Press of Glencoe.

In 1960, Kaplan was recruited by Macmillan to provide new editorial leadership and he agreed to move to New York if Macmillan Publishing Company would buy Free Press, and thus Free Press was sold in 1960 for $1.3 million ($500,000 going to Kaplan and $800,000 going to Liebman).

In 1994, Simon & Schuster acquired Macmillan and Free Press. In 2012, it was announced that Free Press would cease to exist as a distinct entity and would be merged into Simon & Schuster, the company's flagship imprint. "We plan to continue publishing thought leaders and other important cultural voices under the Free Press imprimatur, while also introducing many other Free Press authors, such as novelists and historians and business writers, to the flagship Simon & Schuster imprint."

During the 1960s and 1970s Free Press was under the direction of a variety of publishers including George McCune (who later co-founded SAGE Publishing with his wife Sara), Valery Webb, Ed Barry and Robert Wallace. Under Barry's leadership in 1974, Ernest Becker's The Denial of Death won the Pulitzer Prize. In 1983, Erwin Glikes, a political neoconservative, took over leadership. This began an era of controversial conservative books including The Tempting of America by Robert Bork, and The Closing of the American Mind by Allan Bloom. Glikes was succeeded by Adam Bellow, who also published neoconservative books including Illiberal Education by Dinesh D'Souza, The Real Anita Hill by David Brock, and The Bell Curve by Charles Murray and Richard Herrnstein. In 1994, Simon & Schuster acquired Macmillan and Free Press was led by publishers Michael Jacobs, Paula Barker Duffy, and William Shinker for short stints.

Free Press was led by publisher Martha Levin from 2001 until 2012, when it ceased to exist as a distinct entity and merged into Simon & Schuster's flagship imprint. In 2003, two of the five finalists for the 2003 National Book Award in the nonfiction category were Free Press titles, including the winner, Waiting for Snow in Havana by Carlos Eire. In 2008, Free Press published The White Tiger, Indian author Aravind Adiga's debut novel, which won the Man Booker Prize.

== Notable books ==
- Robert K. Merton (1957). Social Theory and Social Structure. Glencoe, IL: Free Press
- Everett Rogers (1962). Diffusion of Innovations. Glencoe, IL: Free Press
- Dworkin, Andrea (1987). Intercourse. New York: Free Pr. ISBN 0029079705.
- Covey, Stephen R. (1989). The Seven Habits of Highly Effective People. New York: Free Press. ISBN 0-7432-6951-9. OCLC 56413718.
- Everdell, William R. (1983). The End of Kings: A History of Republics and Republicans. New York: Free Press. ISBN 0-226-22482-1.
- Fukuyama, Francis (1992). The End of History and the Last Man. New York: Free Press. ISBN 0-02-910975-2. OCLC 231335005.
- Herrnstein, Richard J.; Murray, Charles A. (1994). The Bell Curve: intelligence and class structure in American life. New York: Free Press. ISBN 0-02-914673-9. OCLC 30913157.
- Behe, Michael J. (1996). Darwin's Black Box: the biochemical challenge to evolution. New York: The Free Press. ISBN 0-684-82754-9. OCLC 34150540.
- Harris, Judith Rich (1998). The Nurture Assumption: Why Children Turn Out the Way They Do. New York: Free Press. ISBN 0-684-84409-5. OCLC 39368588.
- Mezrich, Ben (2003). Bringing Down the House. New York: Free Press. ISBN 0-7432-4999-2. OCLC 53220540.
- Ali, Ayaan Hirsi (2007). Infidel. New York: Free Press. ISBN 978-0-7432-8968-9. OCLC 72701599.
- Draper, Robert (2007). Dead Certain: The Presidency of George W. Bush. New York: Free Press. ISBN 978-0-7432-7728-0. OCLC 145379548.
- Adiga, Aravind (2008). The White Tiger. New York: Free Press.
- Eire, Carlos (2008). Waiting for Snow in Havana. New York: Free Press.
- Harris, Sam (2010). The Moral Landscape: How Science Can Determine Human Values. Free Press. ISBN 978-1-4391-7121-9. OCLC 535493357.
