= Bill Vidal =

Cuban-American author and politician

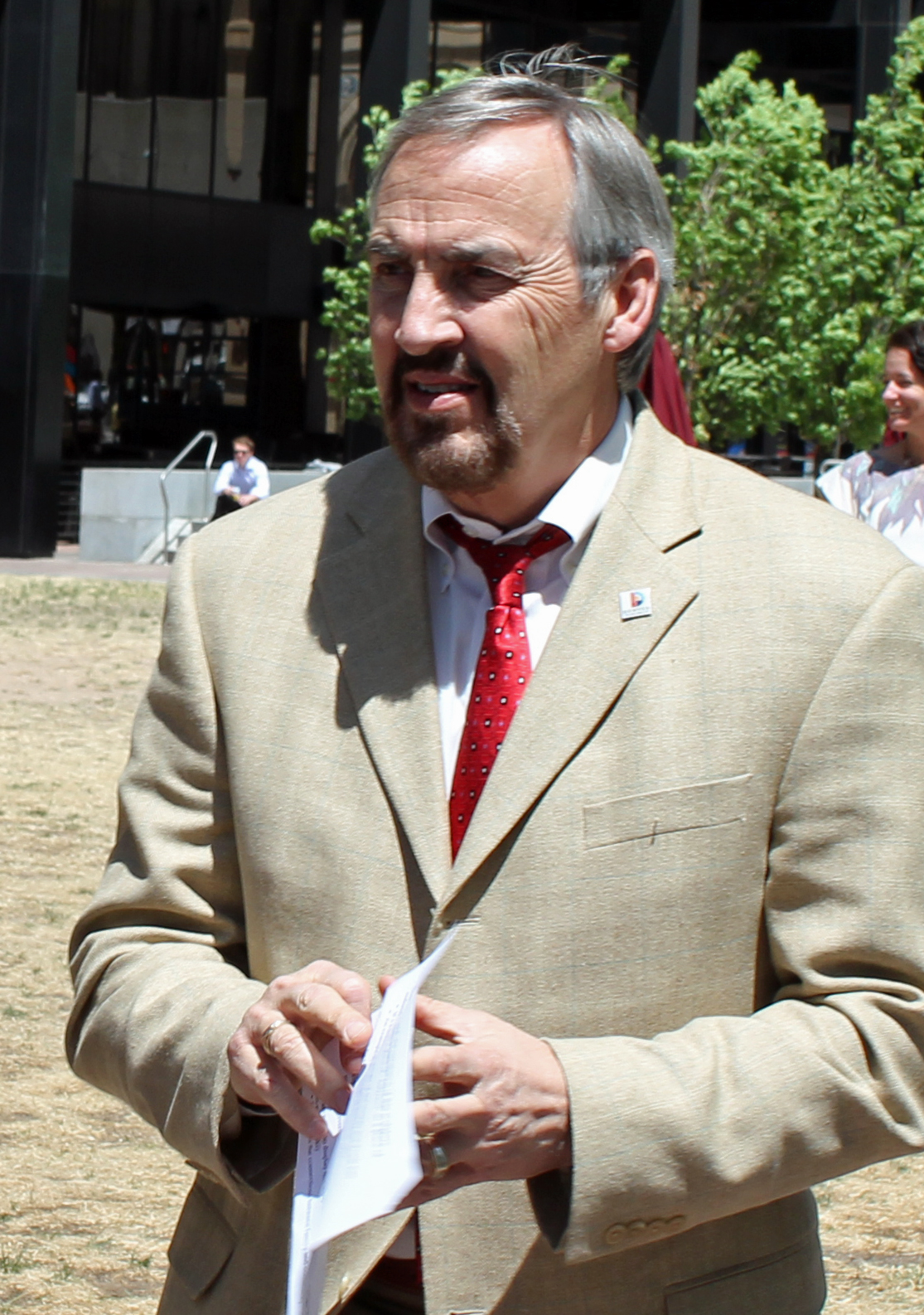
- Vidal in 2011

44th Mayor of Denver
- In office January 12, 2011 – July 18, 2011
- Preceded by: John Hickenlooper
- Succeeded by: Michael Hancock

Personal details
- Born: July 19, 1951 (age 75) Camagüey, Cuba
- Party: Democratic
- Spouse: Gabriela Vidal
- Education: University of Colorado Denver

Guillermo "Bill" Vidal (born July 19, 1951) is a Cuban American author and career civil servant who served as the 44th mayor of Denver, Colorado.

Vidal served as deputy mayor under John Hickenlooper until Hickenlooper resigned his position as mayor in order to serve as the governor of Colorado. Vidal was then sworn in as mayor on January 12, 2011 and served until July 18, 2011 when his successor Michael Hancock was sworn in.

After he moved from deputy to mayor, Vidal did not run for the office, choosing instead to serve only until a new mayor could be elected.

Following his service as Mayor of Denver, he became president and CEO of the Hispanic Chamber of Commerce of Metro Denver.

== Biography ==
Section source

Bill Vidal is a native of Camagüey, Cuba, where he was born to Roberto and Marta Vidal. He and his brothers arrived in the United States in 1961 via Operation Peter Pan. The brothers were sent to live at the Sacred Heart Orphanage in Pueblo, Colorado, and reunited with their family four years later.

Vidal earned a bachelor's degree in civil engineering from the University of Colorado Denver. He is a registered professional engineer with over 30 years of experience in the public sector of state and city government.

=== Colorado Department of Transportation (CDOT) ===
Guillermo Vidal worked 23 years with the Colorado Department of Transportation. He started as a Highway Design Engineer, and worked his way up to the executive director position under Governor Roy Romer. His career at CDOT included being the Region II District Engineer, Region VI Transportation Director, and 5 years as executive director. As executive director he implemented a re-engineering effort of all project design and construction processes, completed the first statewide multi-modal transportation, and establishing the first air quality policy for the state.

=== Denver Regional Council of Governments (DRCOG) ===
From 1999 to 2004, Bill served as executive director of the DRCOG. Vidal completed the restructuring of the organization to reduce bureaucracy and increase energy and participation. He brought together a consensus among DRCOG's 50 members (9 counties; 41 municipalities) that unanimously adopted the 20-Year Transportation Plan and the Clean Water Plan. He directed the investment of a $40 million in regional projects, including the Central Platte Valley Light Rail Spur and Denver Union Station.

=== City and County of Denver ===
Bill Vidal moved onto the public works manager for City and County of Denver, which also including being the Deputy Mayor. During his tenure with Denver, Vidal negotiated a critical $50 billion, 20-year franchise agreement with Xcel Energy. He also introduced an extensive street and bridge construction program for the city, and developed the city's first Storm Sewer and Sanitary Sewer Master Plans. With his strategic planning expertise at CDOT, he developed Denver's first Strategic Transportation Plan including a multi-modal transportation plan. He also oversaw the completion of construction and expansion projects for Denver's Colorado Convention Center and the Denver Art Museum, these projects totaling over $500 million in costs.
