= Carlos Eire =

American historian and academic

Carlos M. N. Eire
- Born: Havana, Cuba
- Education: Loyola University Chicago (BA); Yale University (PhD)
- Occupation: Professor

Carlos M. N. Eire is the T. Lawrason Riggs Professor of History and Religious Studies at Yale University. He is a historian of late medieval and early modern Europe.

== Education ==
Eire received his Bachelor of Arts in History and Theology in 1973 from Loyola University, Chicago. He obtained his doctoral degree from Yale University in 1979.

== Career ==
Before joining the Yale faculty in 1996, Eire taught at St. John's University in Minnesota and the University of Virginia, and was a member of the Institute for Advanced Study in Princeton for two years.

His most recent book, They Flew: A History of the Impossible (Yale, 2023), won the 2024 Award for the Excellence in the Study of Religion: Historical Studies from the American Academy of Religion. His other books include War Against the Idols (Cambridge, 1986), From Madrid to Purgatory (Cambridge, 1995), A Very Brief History of Eternity (Princeton, 2009), The Life of Saint Teresa of Avila: A Biography (Princeton, 2019) and Reformations: Early Modern Europe 1450-1700 (Yale, 2016), for which he received the R.R. Hawkins Award for best book and the American Publishers Awards for Professional & Scholarly Excellence of 2017. He is also co-author of Jews, Christians, Muslims: An Introduction to Monotheistic Religions (Prentice Hall, 1997). His memoir of the Cuban Revolution, Waiting for Snow in Havana (Free Press, 2003), won the U.S. National Book Award for Nonfiction and has been translated into many languages. A second memoir, Learning to Die in Miami (November 2010) focuses on the early years of his exile in the United States.

== Personal life ==
Carlos Eire was born in Havana, Cuba, on 23 November 1950. His mother was Maria Azucena Eiré González and his father was Antonio Nieto Cortadellas - a prominent judge before Fidel Castro's revolution. His brother Tony died in 2018.

Eire (age 11) and his brother Tony fled to the United States in 1962, amongst 14,000 unaccompanied Cuban children airlifted by Operation Peter Pan. His mother would eventually join him a few years later, but never his father, who died unexpectedly in 1976 while trying to leave Cuba.

Eire married his wife, Jane Vanderlyn Ulrich, in January 1984. They have three children.

Eire is a devout Catholic, commenting in 2024 that "being Catholic has made me realize the positive role that history has played in the formation of my faith as well as of my character".

== Bibliography ==
- War Against the Idols: The Reformation of Worship From Erasmus to Calvin, 1986
- From Madrid to Purgatory: The Art and Craft of Dying in Sixteenth Century Spain, 1995
- Jews, Christians, Muslims: An Introduction to Monotheistic Religions (co-author), 1997
- Waiting for Snow in Havana, 2003
- A Very Brief History of Eternity, 2009
- Learning to Die in Miami, 2010
- Reformations: The Early Modern World, 1450-1650, 2016
- The Life of Saint Teresa of Avila: A Biography, 2019
- They Flew: A History of the Impossible, 2023

== See also ==
- Cuban American literature
- List of Cuban-American writers
- List of Historians
