= Miami Dade College =

Public college in Miami, Florida, US

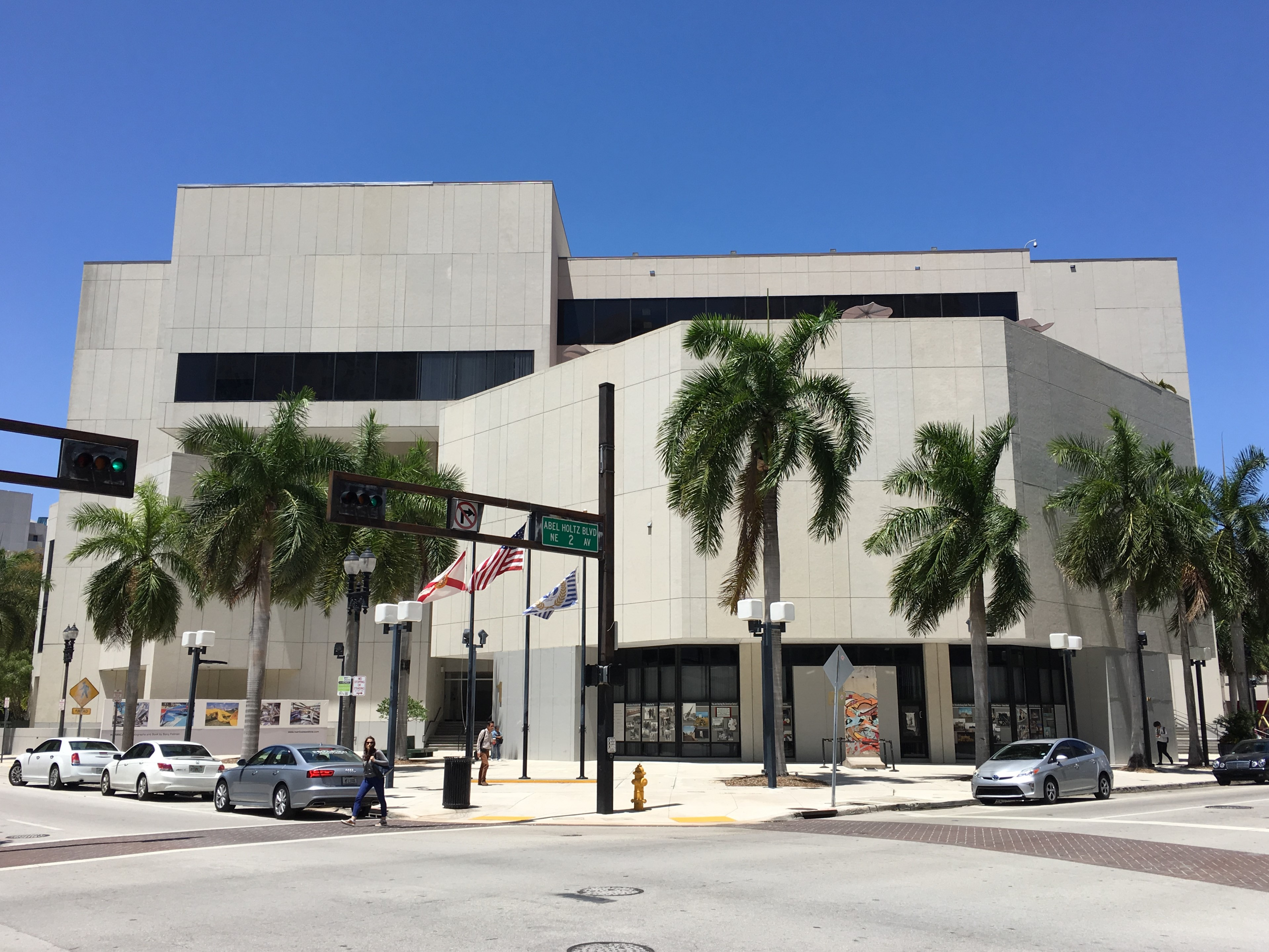
- Former names: Dade County Junior College (1960–1973); Miami-Dade Community College (1973–2003)
- Motto: Scientia est potentia (Latin)
- Motto in English: "Knowledge is power"
- Type: Public college
- Established: 1960; 66 years ago
- Parent institution: Florida College System
- Accreditation: SACS
- Endowment: $227.2 million (2025)
- President: Madeline Pumariega
- Faculty: 703 (full-time); 1814 (part-time)
- Undergraduates: 47,245 (fall 2022)
- Location: Miami, Florida, United States; 25°46′40″N 80°11′26″W
- Campus: Large city
- Colors: Blue and gray
- Nickname: Sharks
- Sporting affiliations: NJCAA Region 8 – Southern Conference
- Mascot: Finn the Shark
- Website: www.mdc.edu

Miami Dade College (MDC) is a public college located in Miami, Florida, United States. Established in 1960, MDC operates eight campuses and numerous outreach centers throughout Miami-Dade County. It is the largest institution in the Florida College System.

On September 30, 2025, the state of Florida approved a plan for the Donald J. Trump Presidential Library to be built at the college.

== History ==
Founded as Dade County Junior College in 1960, MDC began on a high school farm and became desegregated in 1962, opening its doors to students of all races. Over the decades, MDC expanded by launching several campuses, including Kendall, Wolfson, and Hialeah, and established a Medical Center to support students in health programs.

In 1973, the college changed its name to Miami-Dade Community College.

During the 1980s, outreach programs were developed to assist the increasing number of Cuban exiles and other immigrants. As state education budgets declined, MDC continued to grow and relied on its foundation to support operations.

In the 1990s and 2000s, the college established its Honors College, offering rigorous academic programs across its largest campuses. In 2001, founding dean Alexandria Holloway, set the Honors College's academic standards and turned it into a route into highly selective universities.

In 2000, the college was sanctioned by the American Association of University Professors "for infringement of governance standards".

In 2003, the college changed its name to "Miami Dade College" and began offering four-year degree programs.

== Campuses ==
Miami Dade College operates eight campuses and two outreach centers throughout Miami-Dade County. The North Campus, established in 1960, focuses on emergency services and entertainment technology programs. Kendall Campus, opened in 1967, is home to MDC's athletic teams and offers community service programs. Wolfson Campus, in downtown Miami, hosts the Miami Book Fair and houses the Culinary Institute. The Medical Campus, opened in 1977, offers nursing and health programs with a simulation hospital. Homestead Campus, built in 1990, features an FAA-approved aviation program. Eduardo J. Padrón Campus specializes in bilingual education and community-focused programs. Hialeah Campus offers English programs and a Bachelor of Applied Science in Management. West Campus in Doral provides innovative programs like the Tesla START program and the Certified Nursing Assistant program.

== Academics ==
MDC offers a wide variety of associate and baccalaureate degrees, as well as vocational and technical certificates. The college is known for its strong programs in liberal arts, nursing, business, allied health professions, and computer information systems. Students can also pursue degrees in newer fields like cybersecurity.

The Honors College provides scholarships and specialized curricula for high-achieving students, with opportunities for transfer to prestigious universities, including a partnership with the University of Miami. Dual-enrollment and virtual learning options are available for high school and home-educated students.

== Athletics ==
MDC participates in the Southern Conference of the National Junior College Athletic Association (NJCAA) and competes in five sports: men's and women's basketball, baseball, softball, and volleyball, with soccer teams being added in 2024. MDC teams have won 35 NJCAA national titles, making it a hub for talented athletes and MLB scouts. During its early history, the north campus gymnasium area also hosted the Miami Floridians (later known simply as The Floridians) ABA franchise; it hosted five playoff games (April 6, 1971, April 8, 1971, April 12, 1971, and April 4, 1972 & April 6, 1972) before the franchise folded in 1972.

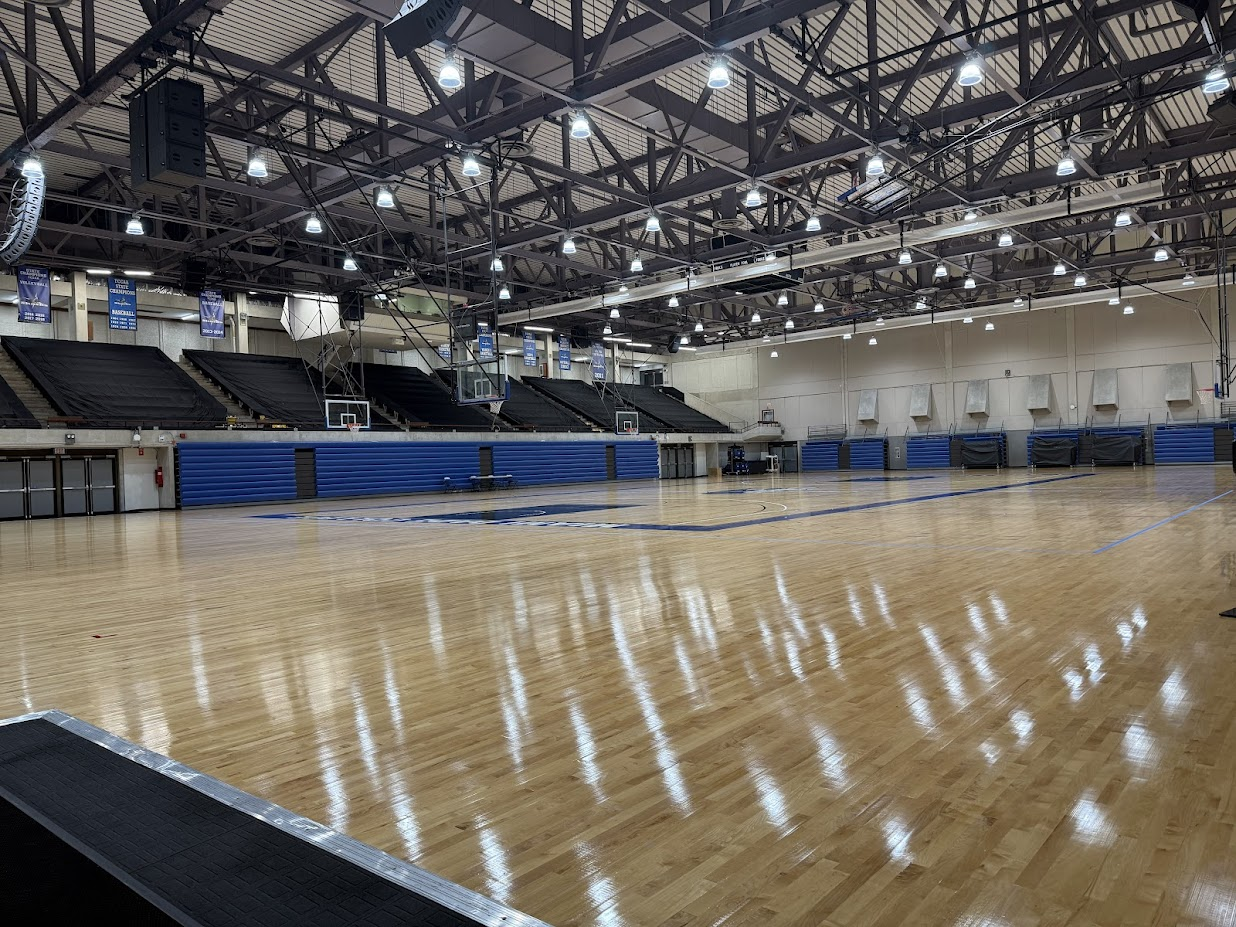
Kendall Campus Gymnasium

== Arts and culture ==
MDC has an extensive art collection of over 1,600 works, including paintings, sculptures, and installations. The Wolfson Campus hosts the Miami Book Fair International, the largest literary festival in the U.S.

== Notable achievements ==
In 2019, MDC was recognized by the Aspen Institute for its focus on economic and social mobility, winning the Aspen Prize. The $1 million prize, awarded every two years, noted MDC's "clear path to economic and social mobility for its students" as well as its demographic diversity.

== Notable alumni ==
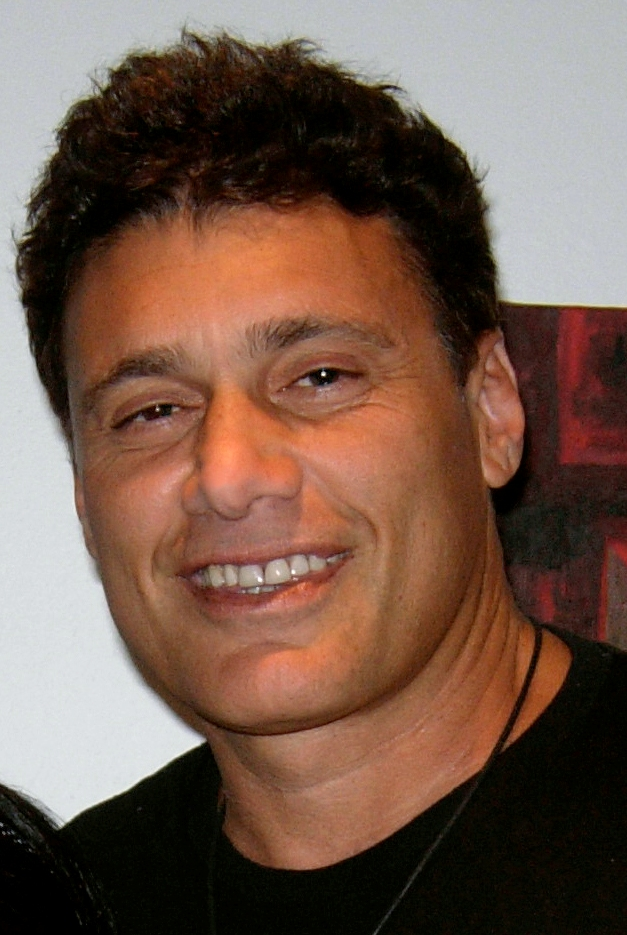
Steven Bauer, American-Cuban actor

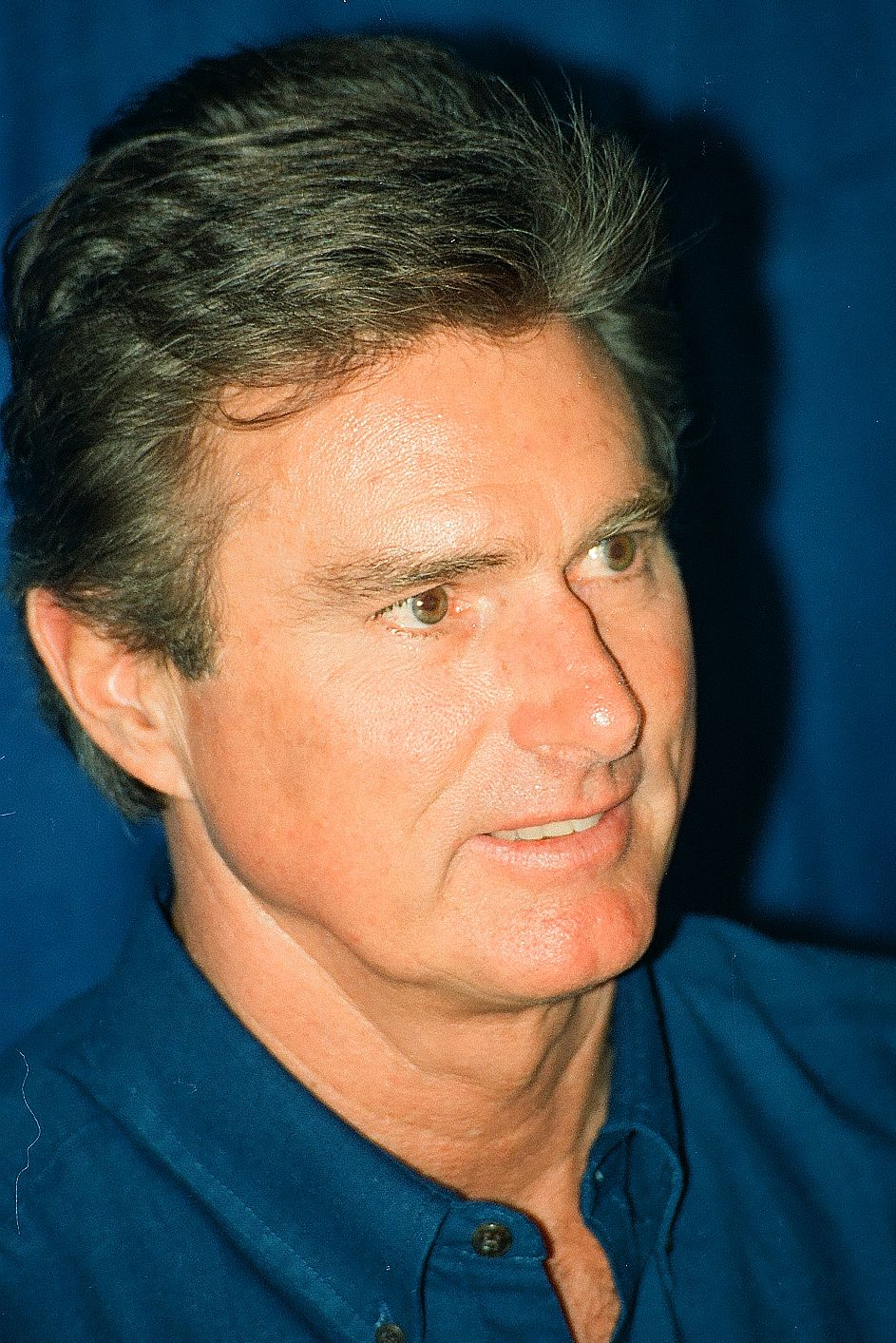
Steve Carlton, American professional baseball player

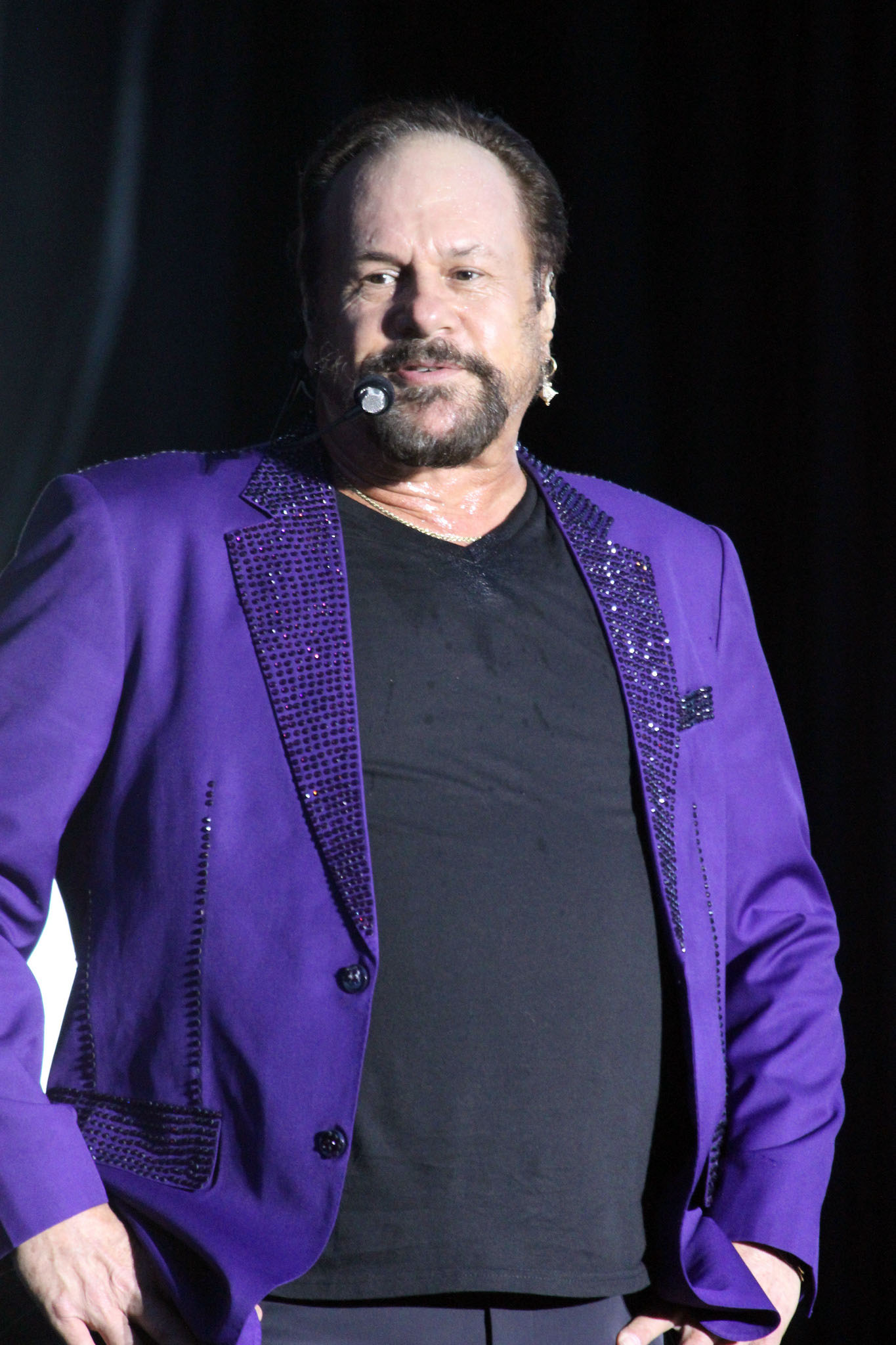
Harry Wayne Casey, American musician

Manuel "Manny" Alberto Diaz, Mayor of Miami, 2001–2009

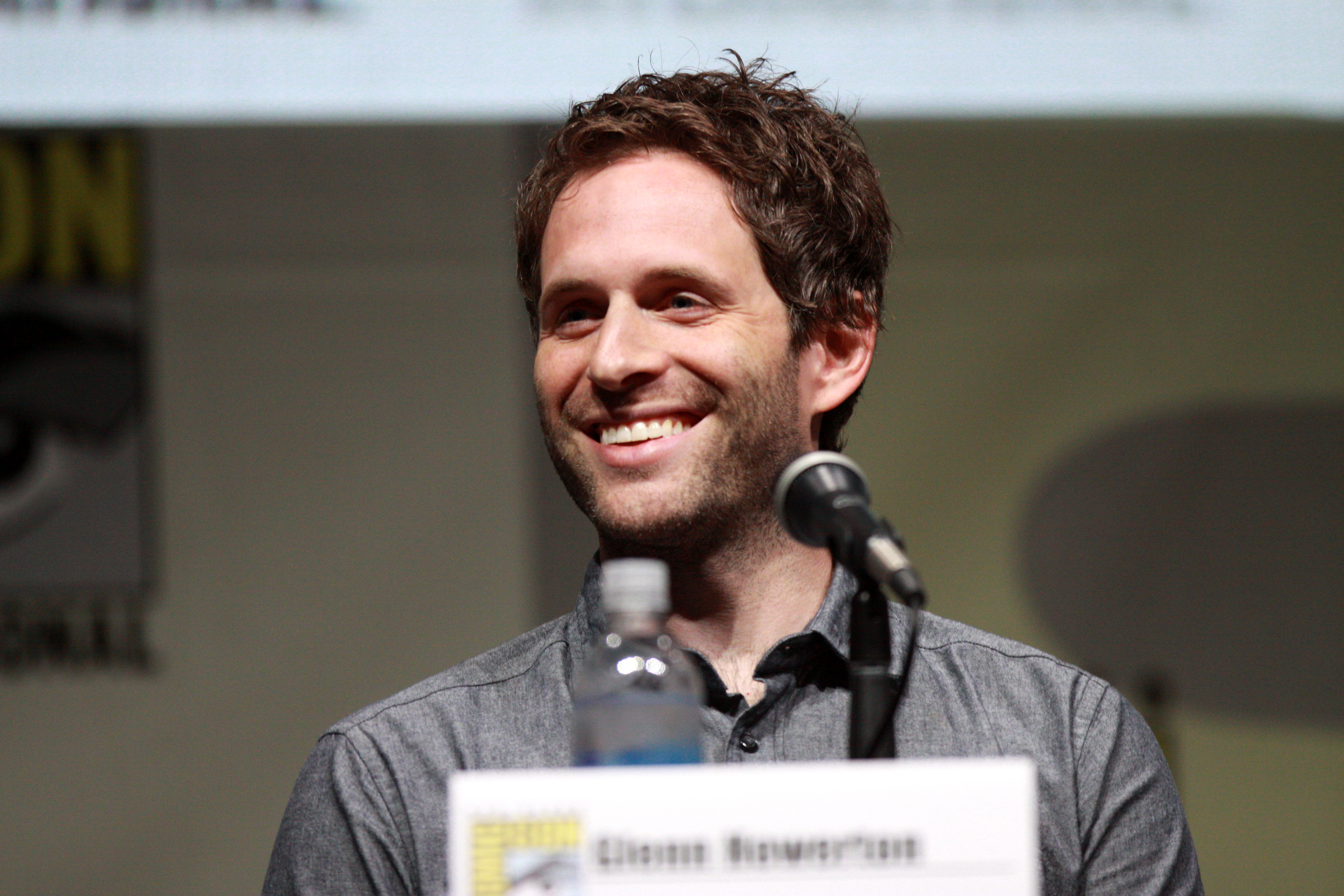
Glenn Howerton, American actor

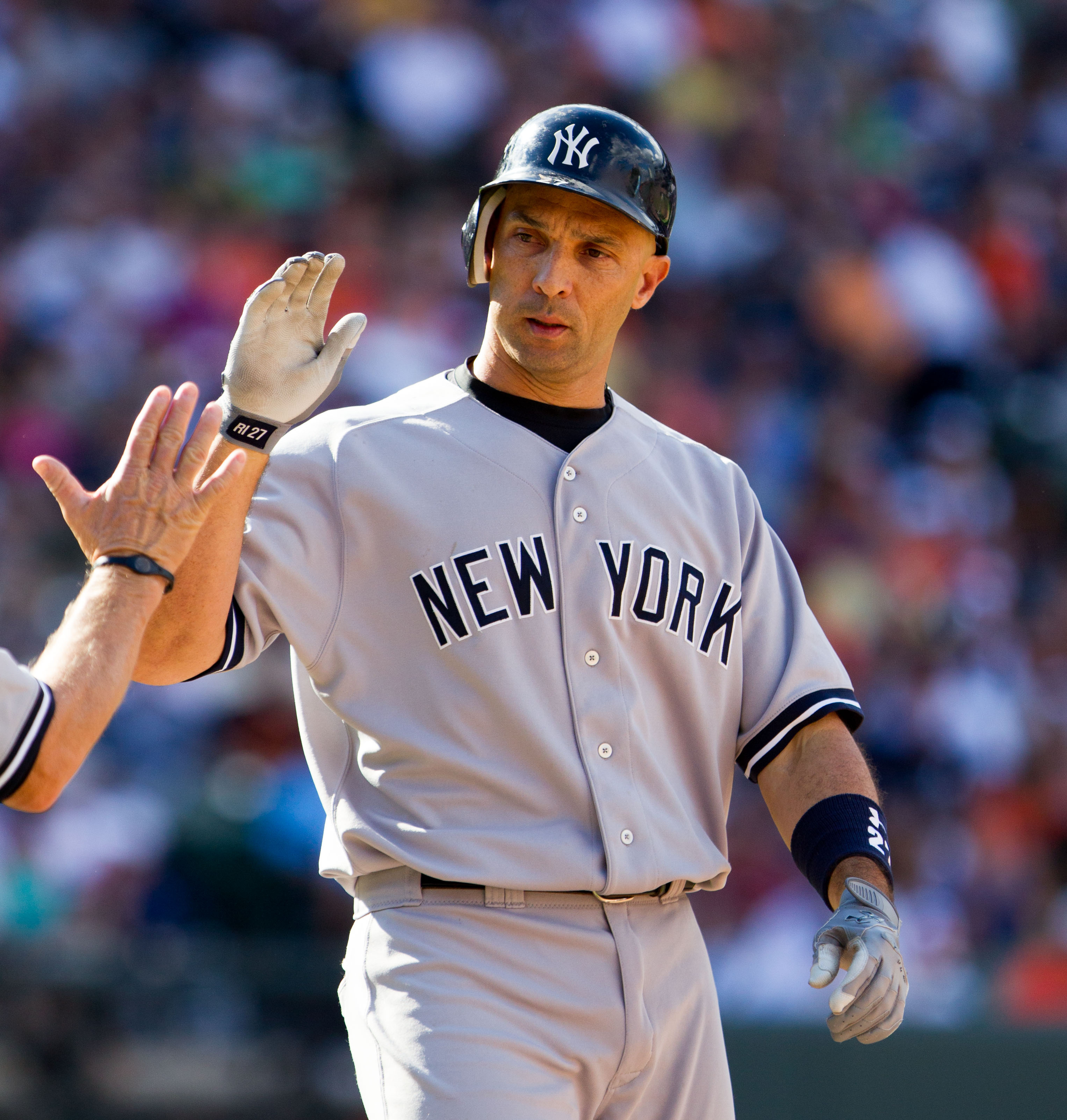
Raúl Ibañez, American professional baseball player

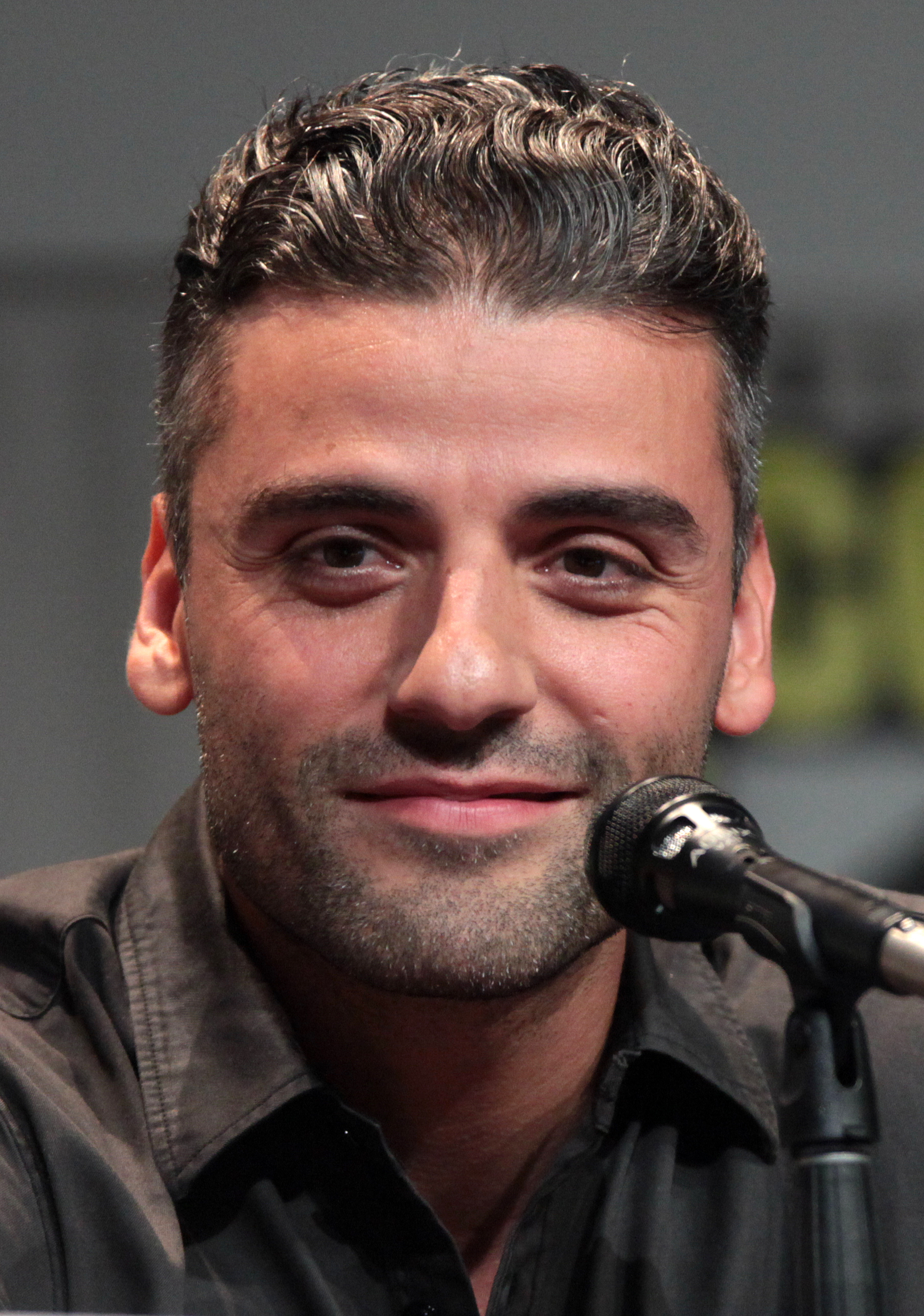
Oscar Isaac, American actor and singer

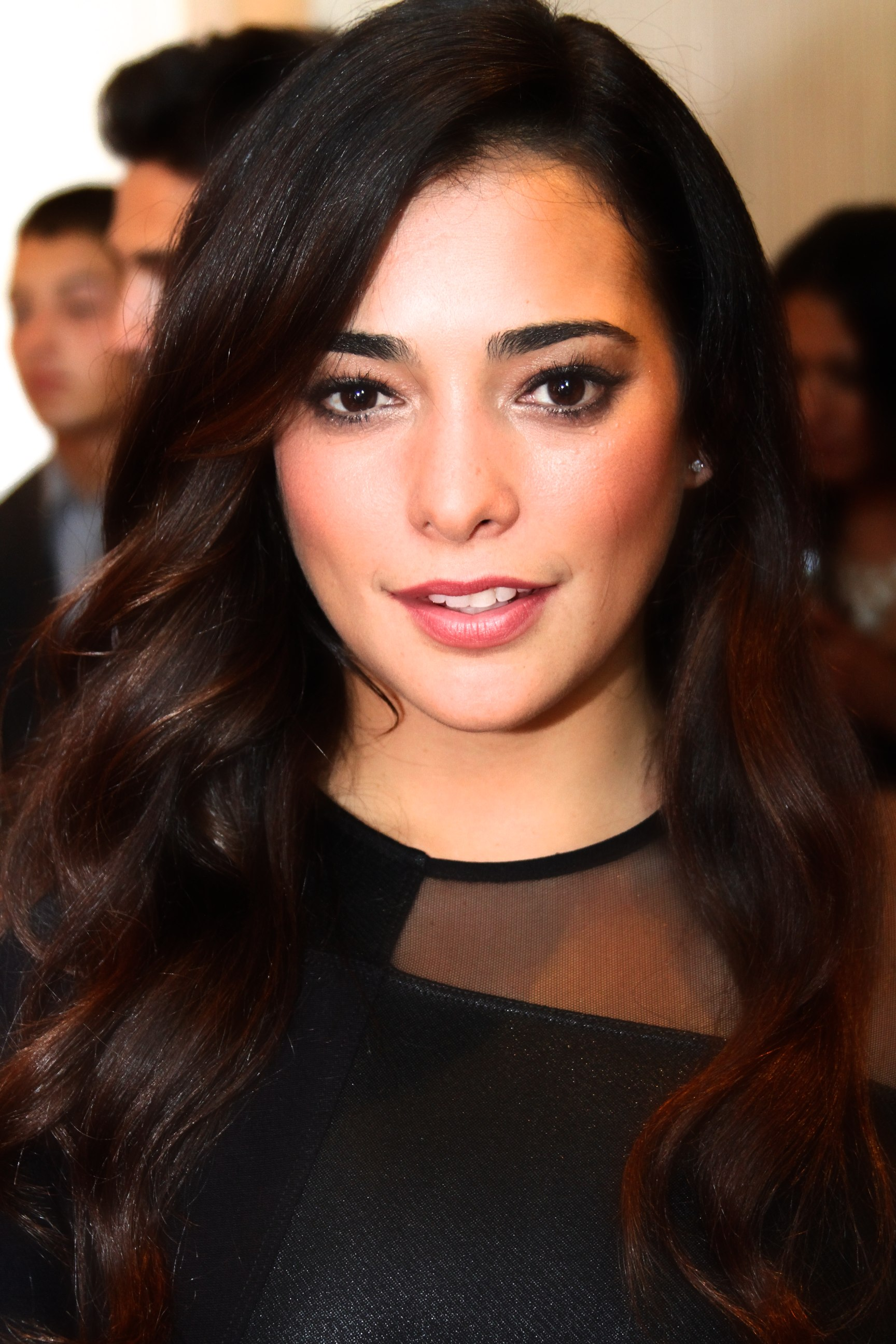
Natalie Martinez, American actress and model

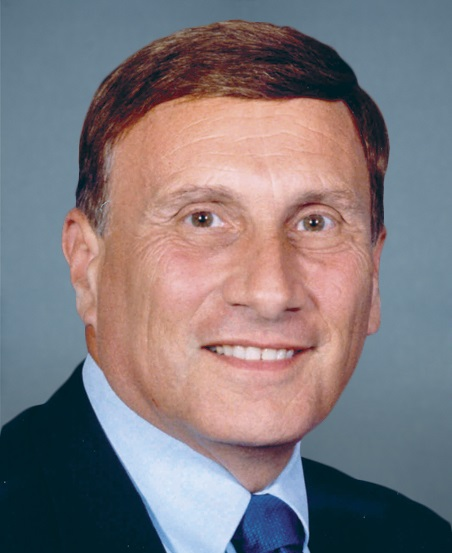
John Mica, former U.S. representative

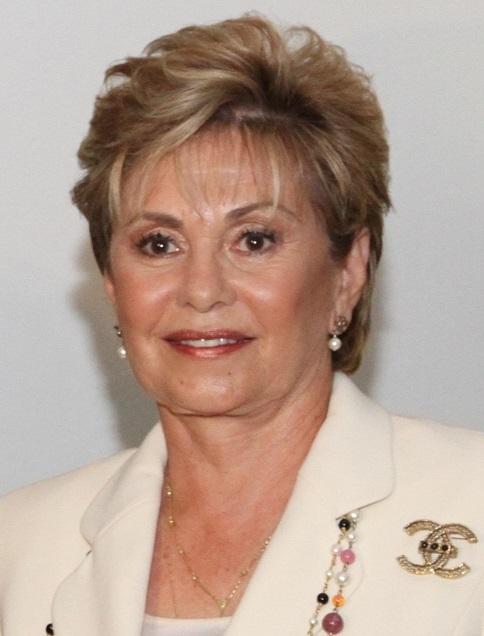
Mireya Moscoso, president of Panama from 1999 to 2004

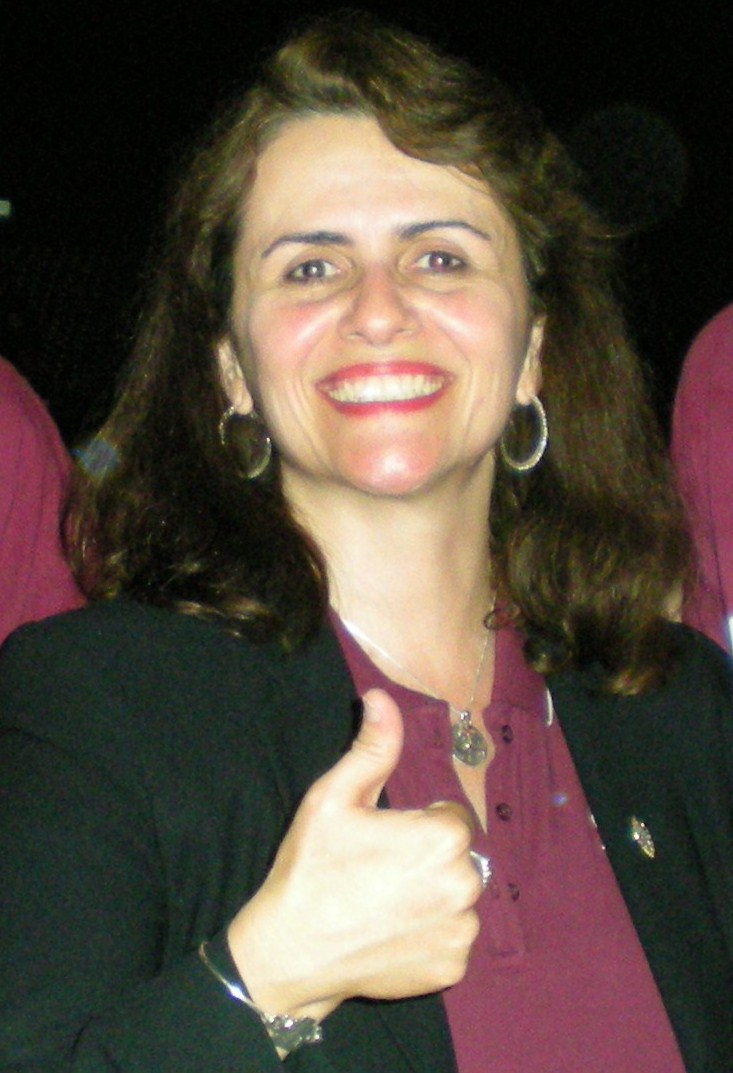
Elsa Murano, president of Texas A&M University

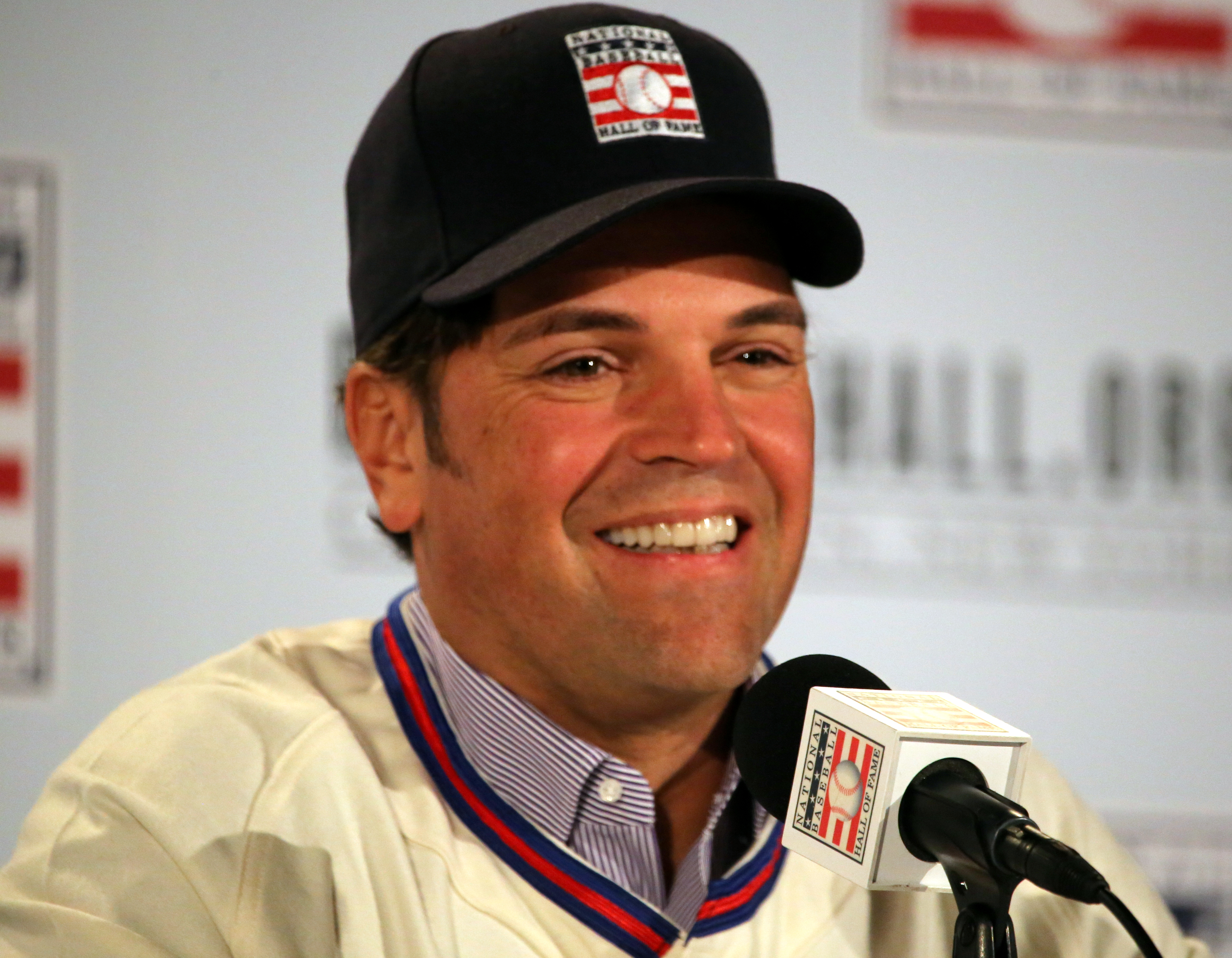
Mike Piazza, American professional baseball player

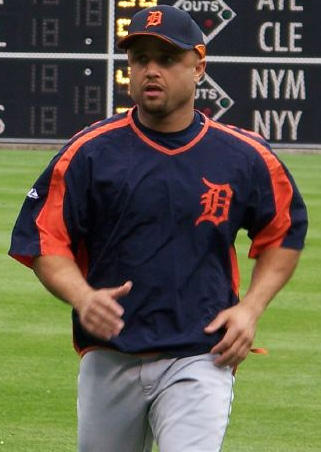
Plácido Polanco, American-Dominican professional baseball player

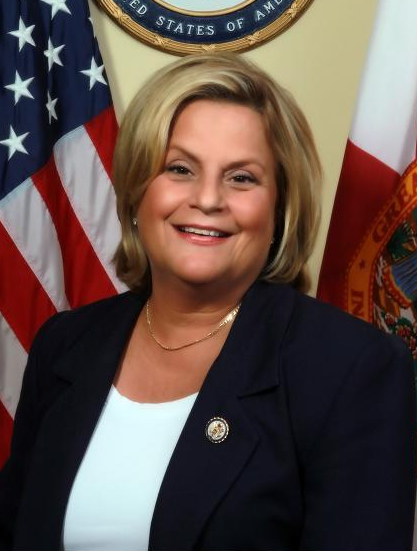
Ileana Ros-Lehtinen, former U.S. representative

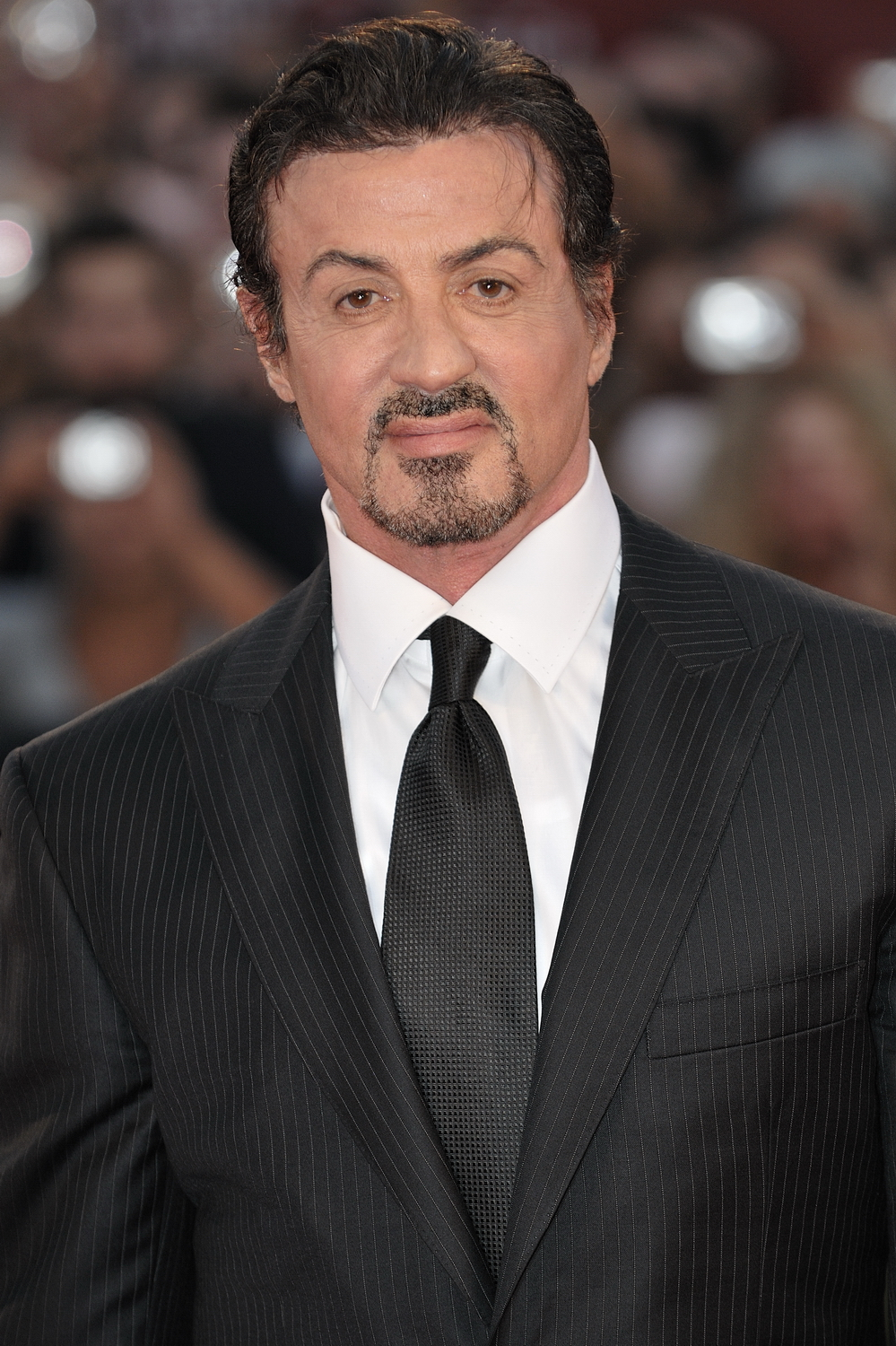
Sylvester Stallone, American actor

== Notable faculty ==
- Joanna Falco-Leshin, professor of English and Humanities
