= Eduardo J. Padrón =

American academic

Eduardo Padrón
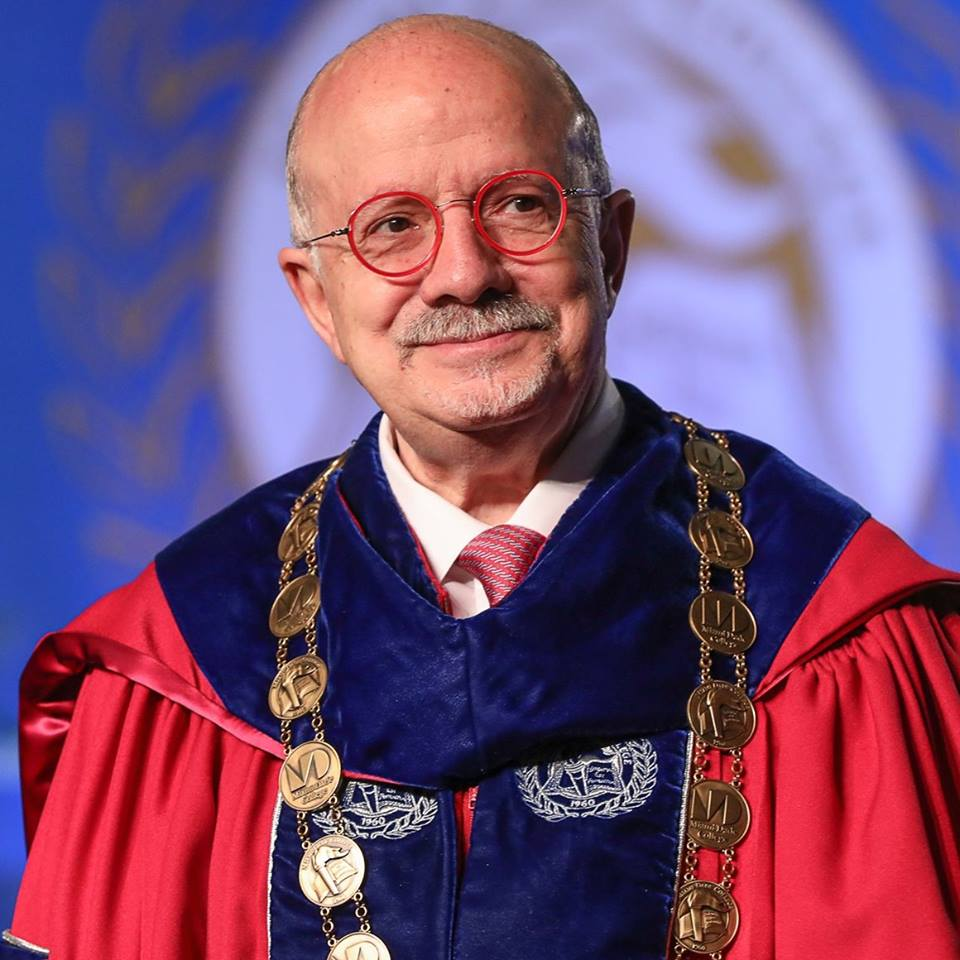

President of Miami Dade College
- In office 1995–2019
- Preceded by: Robert McCabe
- Succeeded by: Madeline Pumariega

Personal details
- Born: June 26, 1944 (age 82) Santiago de Cuba, Cuba
- Party: Democratic
- Education: Miami Dade College (attended); Florida Atlantic University (BA); University of Florida (MA, PhD)

Eduardo José Padrón (born June 26, 1944) is President Emeritus of Miami Dade College (MDC). An economist by training, Padrón earned his Ph.D. from the University of Florida. After serving as a faculty member at MDC, he became the school's president in 1995. Time named him one of the ten best college presidents in 2009, and he was awarded the Presidential Medal of Freedom in 2016.

== Early life ==
In 1961, Eduardo J. Padrón left his hometown, Marianao, a hard-scrabble municipality in Havana, with nothing but the clothes he was wearing. He was 16, the son of a marketing director for a pharmaceutical company, with his younger brother Ernesto, nearly 13 and on a night flight to Miami, Florida under Operation Peter Pan. At the time, he did not speak English and struggled in a school system that lacked bilingual education programs.

After graduating from Miami Senior High School, Padrón attended Miami Dade College (then Dade County Junior College) and then went on to earn a B.A. Degree in Economics from Florida Atlantic University. He attended graduate school at the University of Florida, completing master's and doctoral degrees in economics.

== Miami Dade College career ==
When Padrón finished his education, he was about to accept a job offer at DuPont, but he was still connected to his old professors at MDC. They then asked him to apply for a faculty position at the school. Padrón joined the college in 1970 as an assistant professor of Economics, and rose through the administrative ranks, serving as chairperson of the Institute of Culture and Language Training, director of the Division of Special Programs and Continuing Education, and academic dean, all at Wolfson Campus. He then served as Wolfson Campus president from 1980 to 1995. Since 1995, he has served as the president of Miami Dade College. The school enrolls and graduates more black and Hispanic students than any other institute of higher education in the nation.

In 2006, Padrón retired from MDC. He collected $893,286 in lump sum benefits and started receiving retirement pay of $14,631 a month. One month later, Padrón returned to his position at the college and was receiving his annual salary again. This practice, which has been undertaken by a number of Florida public officials, has been criticized by local media sources as "double dipping". Padrón's spokesperson said that college trustees asked Padrón to come back after he had announced his retirement. The spokesperson said that the practice is legal.

MDC is one of 14 Florida community colleges that can grant bachelor's degrees. Padrón says that the school's curricula focus on degree programs that will directly prepare graduates for the workforce.

== Civic leadership ==
Padrón is a member of the board of directors of the Council on Foreign Relations. He was appointed honorary consul to Morocco in 2016. He chairs the President's Advisory Commission on Educational Excellence for Hispanics.

== Awards ==
Padrón's individual honors and awards include: 2012 Aspen Institute Ascend Fellowship; the Carnegie Corporation Centennial Academic Leadership Award; and the 2011 TIAA-CREF Theodore M. Hesburgh Award for Leadership Excellence.

He is a guest columnist for Hispanic Magazine and the Miami Herald. He has been featured as a prominent Hispanic figure in People magazine, Hispanic Magazine and PODER. In 2009, Time included him on the list of "The 10 Best College Presidents." In 2010, Florida Trend magazine named him "Floridian of the Year." In 2011, The Washington Post named him one of the eight most influential college presidents in the U.S. In 2012, Princeton University awarded him an honorary Doctorate of Laws, and in 2013 Brown University awarded him an honorary Doctor of Humane Letters.

In November 2016, Padrón was announced as one of the recipients of the Presidential Medal of Freedom.

After he stepped down from his position of school president, the Interamerican Campus was renamed to the Eduardo J. Padron Campus. In 2021, Padrón received from the UC Berkeley Academic Senate the Clark Kerr Award for distinguished leadership in higher education.

== Personal life ==
Padrón is divorced. He has a son and two grandchildren.
