= List of What's Happening Now!! episodes =

Below is a list of episodes from What's Happening Now!!, a sitcom that aired in first run syndication from 1985 to 1988.

== Series overview ==
Season	Episodes	Originally released	
Season	Episodes	First released	Last released
1	22	September 7, 1985	March 16, 1986
2	22	September 27, 1986	March 28, 1987
3	22	September 26, 1987	March 26, 1988

== Episodes ==
=== Season 1 (1985–86) ===
No. overall	No. in season	Title	Directed by	Written by	Original release date
1	1	"The Return of Raj"	Gary Brown	Kim Weiskopf & Michael S. Baser	September 7, 1985
Roger "Raj" Thomas returns to his old neighborhood with his new wife, Nadine, after his mother sells them the family home. When friends Dwayne and Shirley see lights inside, they assume an intruder has broken in, not realizing Raj has moved back. After the mix-up is resolved, they reunite and decide to surprise their friend Rerun with Raj's return. Rerun, however, reacts coolly, worried that Raj's success as a writer will overshadow his own career as a television commercial pitchman. Dwayne eventually convinces them to reconcile, and Rerun realizes Raj has not changed. While visiting familiar places, Raj discovers that Rob's Place, the friends' former hangout, is now abandoned. Shirley admits she has always wanted to buy the property but cannot afford it alone. Raj offers to become her partner, giving them the opportunity to reopen the restaurant and restore it as a gathering spot for the community.
2	2	"A Horse Is Not A Home"	Gary Brown	Mike Milligan & Jay Moriarty	September 14, 1985
Rerun, known for his used car commercials as "Swami Stubbs," unexpectedly receives a horse as a trade-in on a vehicle. Unable to house it himself, he convinces a reluctant Raj to keep the animal temporarily until it can be sold. Rerun places a newspaper advertisement for the horse, but the listing is misprinted as "House for Sale." While Raj is on the phone with his literary agent, a married couple arrives in response to the ad. Jokingly, they offer $5,000, which Raj assumes is for the horse. He accepts the cash, only to discover the couple believes they have purchased his home. The pair refuses to leave, prompting Raj, Nadine, and Rerun to devise a plan to frighten them into backing out. The scheme fails when Nadine unexpectedly returns home. After hearing Raj and Nadine's plea, the wife persuades her husband to cancel the deal. Raj, relieved, thanks them and offers the horse as a goodwill gesture.
3	3	"Dwayne's Crush"	Tony Singletary	Sam Greenbaum	September 21, 1985
Dwayne accompanies Raj to the dentist and meets Theresa, a woman in the waiting room. She asks him out, and they soon become steady companions. Dwayne’s constant talk about her begins to irritate Rerun. When Raj returns to the dentist for another appointment, he overhears someone mention that Theresa is married but does not catch the name of her husband. At Rob’s Place, Raj shares the news, and the friends confront Theresa when she arrives looking for Dwayne. She admits she is married and explains she came to end the relationship. Upon learning that Dwayne is at the dentist, she panics, revealing her husband is the dentist and a jealous man. At the dental office, the dentist prepares to perform extensive work on Dwayne, aware of the affair. Theresa, Raj, and Rerun arrive and interrupt the procedure. Theresa confesses to her husband that she dated Dwayne only to make him notice her and give her more attention. The couple reconciles, leaving Dwayne relieved.
4	4	"The Houseguest"	Tony Singletary	Kurt Taylor	September 28, 1985
When Dwayne and Rerun have a falling out, Raj and Nadine agree to let Dwayne temporarily stay with them. When Dwayne begins to overstay his welcome, they hatch a plot to get Rerun and Dwayne to make amends only to have their plan backfire and end up with Rerun as their house guest.
5	5	"One Enchanted Evening"	Tony Singletary	Diane Pershing & Bob Noonoo	October 5, 1985
On her way to Hawaii, Yvonne Hudson, Raj's wealthy and critical mother-in-law, stops to visit him and Nadine, planning to dine at their restaurant. Wanting to make a good impression, Raj pays local derelict Mr. Lee $20 to stay away for the evening. When Mrs. Hudson arrives, she quickly begins making negative remarks about Raj to Nadine and laments her difficulty finding a man of proper class. At the diner, Shirley has prepared an elegant table and compliments Mrs. Hudson, but she dismisses the food as ordinary and decides to dine at the upscale French restaurant Chez Argent instead. Before they leave, Mr. Lee enters wearing a tuxedo, misunderstanding Raj’s payment as an invitation to impress the guest. Believing him to be an aristocrat, Mrs. Hudson invites him to join them. She and Mr. Lee enjoy each other’s company and leave Raj and Nadine to pay the costly bill. That night, Nadine reassures Raj that her opinion matters less than their love for each other. When Mrs. Hudson returns still charmed by Mr. Lee, Raj stops Nadine from revealing the truth, content in knowing he has Nadine’s support.
6	6	"Aunt Shirley"	Tony Singletary	Ted Bergmann	October 12, 1985
Raj and Nadine plan a romantic weekend in the mountains, leaving Shirley to care for Carolyn. Nadine hesitates when reminded they have not been alone since Carolyn arrived. Overhearing only part of their conversation, Carolyn mistakenly believes they are tired of having her around and decides to run away. At the diner the next day, Dwayne mentions that his Uncle Wendel would take buses out of town when he wanted to get away. Before Shirley can join them, Carolyn convinces Dwayne and Rerun to take her home, where she distracts them with a game of hide-and-seek and slips away to the bus station. There, the ticket clerk informs her she lacks the fare to leave town. Shirley arrives at the Thomas home, discovers Carolyn missing, and realizes she may have gone to the bus station. Just as Raj calls to say the mountain trip was canceled due to a storm, Shirley rushes to the station and finds Carolyn. After a talk about parental love and couples needing private time, Carolyn agrees to return. Shirley arrives home after Raj and Nadine and quickly covers up the incident so they remain unaware.
7	7	"The New Kid"	Gary Shimokawa	Larry Balmagia	October 19, 1985
At the diner, a woman named Lucy leaves abruptly after claiming she must find her missing purse, leaving a ten-year-old girl behind. Nadine investigates and learns the girl, Carolyn, is a runaway from an orphanage. Persuaded by Nadine, Raj agrees to let Carolyn stay with them for the weekend before returning her. Initially unhappy about living with a social worker and her husband, Carolyn slips out during Rerun's breakdance performance and meets Lucy, who plans to use her to steal from the Thomases. Carolyn resists but is convinced by Lucy's warnings about the streets and the orphanage. That night, Carolyn warms to Raj and Nadine but still takes Nadine's heirloom diamond necklace when left alone. The next day at the diner, Raj lets Carolyn count receipts and pays her $10, which moves her to return the necklace. When Lucy later approaches, Carolyn gives her a bag of garbage instead of stolen goods. That evening, Nadine tries to convince Raj to adopt Carolyn. Overhearing their conversation, Carolyn rushes to embrace them as they decide to give her a home.
8	8	"The Bully"	Gary Shimokawa	Jurgen Wolff	October 26, 1985
Dressed in a giant chicken costume, Raj is arrested and placed in a jail cell with a drunk. When Nadine and Carolyn arrive, Raj explains how it happened. Shirley convinced him to wear the suit to promote the diner's chicken dinner special. After enduring jokes from Dwayne and Rerun, Raj chased them out before being sent to hand out flyers on the street. While he was away, Shirley learned a City Health Inspector was visiting. The inspector turns out to be Buddy Carlton, the gang's former high school bully. Recognizing his old victims, Buddy demands that Raj eat a worm or he will close the diner for "health" violations. If appealed, the diner would remain closed for months, risking bankruptcy. Dwayne and Shirley attempt to make a fake worm, but Buddy sees through it and insists on a real one. Raj refuses, throwing a pie at Buddy, which misses and hits a policeman. In the chaos, Raj forces the worm into Buddy's mouth but is arrested for assaulting the officer. Back in the present, Shirley arrives with bail money and reveals she convinced Buddy to reopen the diner by threatening to tell City Hall he ate a worm.
9	9	"That Old Gang of Mine"	Tony Csiki	Bob Peete	November 2, 1985
Nadine organizes a party at Rob's Place to demonstrate to City Hall the need to keep the Neighborhood Youth Center open. While decorating, Raj, Dwayne, and Rerun reminisce about their own youth at the Center, and Rerun takes over a dance lesson from Raj. Meanwhile, Shirley hires local handyman Cecil, who walks with a cane, to repair the jukebox. He says parts are hard to find but may know where to get them. After Cecil leaves, local tough Tico arrives with his gang, announcing plans to revive the old street gang name "Bangers." Shirley recalls the gang's violent past under its leader, Doctor Blood. When Tico pressures the kids to join, Raj warns him to leave, but he promises to return during the party. That night, Raj, Rerun, and Dwayne disguise themselves as Doctor Blood and the Bangers to intimidate Tico. Their plan fails when Raj's wig falls off, prompting Tico to pull a knife. Cecil intervenes, disarming him with his cane and revealing he is the real Doctor Blood, now disabled from gang violence. He urges the youths to avoid gangs, agrees to speak at the City Council meeting, and the party resumes.
10	10	"Dueling Menus"	Tony Csiki	David Braff	November 9, 1985
Dwayne interrupts Raj and Nadine's romantic evening with a computer analysis showing that Rob's Place is losing money. The next day, Raj suspects the cause when Shirley insults a customer, who Rerun later reveals is restaurant critic Perry "Pigout" Peterson. Initially remorseful, Shirley tries to be overly pleasant as the guys pose as customers, but when Rerun takes too long to order, she reverts to her usual bluntness. Raj and Shirley split the diner in half to compete for profits. Each tries various gimmicks—T-shirt ads, fortune telling, and even a belly-dancing floor show—to attract patrons. Shirley escalates to offering free food, and both end up losing money. Dwayne's tally shows Raj lost less, making him the winner. Shirley quits, leaving Raj to manage without her. When Peterson's review praises Shirley as the last of the "old time" waitresses—loud, pushy, rude, and refreshing—the diner fills with customers demanding her return. Nadine unsuccessfully tries to impersonate her. Shirley arrives to collect her belongings, but Raj apologizes and asks her to stay. She agrees, warning she will never change, and heads out to the cheering customers.
11	11	"Dee's Dilemma"	Gary Brown	Ted Bergmann	November 16, 1985
Dee returns home from college for semester break, and everyone is pleased to see how she has matured—except Raj, who still views her as his baby sister. Taking a job at Rob's Place for extra money, Dee meets an old friend working in cosmetics sales. Impressed by her friend's lifestyle, Dee decides to drop out of school and pursue a sales career. Raj is furious, and the two stop speaking. Determined to prove herself, Dee convinces Dwayne and Rerun to let her host her first sales presentation at their apartment. Nadine, Shirley, and Carolyn secretly attend, but Dee's blunt approach to selling alienates the customers. When Raj unexpectedly arrives, Rerun blocks him, but Nadine persuades him to come inside. Raj enters in character as "Monsieur Raj — Makeup Artist to the Stars," pretending to place a large order. The customers see through the act and leave, giving Raj the chance to talk privately with Dee. They reconcile, with Raj promising to treat her as a responsible adult, and Dee admitting there is no easy path to success and deciding to return to college.
12	12	"Raj on the Run"	Gary Brown	Barry Gurstein & David Pitlik	November 23, 1985
Dwayne leaves Rob's Place for a job interview while Rerun heads to pick up a tuxedo for Nadine's charity fashion show. Two FBI agents enter the diner and ask Shirley and Dee about Roger Thomas, specifically whether he wrote the novel The Kremlin Dimension. Suspicious, Shirley sends Dee to warn Raj while she stalls the agents. At home, Raj is lecturing Carolyn about honesty when Dee arrives with the news. Initially dismissive, Raj panics when he hears the agents mentioned his book. He recalls interviewing a State Department official who once asked him to pick up a package at a Chinese laundry—an official who later defected to Russia. When the agents knock, Carolyn and Dee delay them while Raj disguises himself as "Louella," his supposed older sister, and escapes. Carolyn, remembering Raj's advice about telling the truth, directs the agents to Nadine's show. Still in disguise, Raj ends up in the models' dressing room and is pushed onstage wearing Nadine's dress. As the agents close in, they reveal they only wanted a character reference for Dwayne, admired Raj's novel, and that the laundry package contained only clean shirts.
13	13	"The Challenge"	Gary Shimokawa	Larry Balmagia	November 30, 1985
Rob's Place becomes a sponsor for World Class Wrestling, exciting everyone except Raj, who insists wrestling is fake. The group, including Nadine, watches anyway when Shirley demonstrates a wrestling move on Raj. The next day, Raj dresses as "Mr. Good Chef" to film a commercial at the South Street Gym. Ignoring Dwayne's warning not to provoke the wrestlers, Raj calls over Mama's Boy Jones and insults his mother, unknowingly accepting a challenge to wrestle him. After Raj leaves, Mama's Boy's mother tells him to let "Mr. Good Chef" win to appear more human. Later, the gang convinces Raj the match could be dangerous. At the gym, Mama's Boy assures Raj they will stage it so he wins. But after Raj departs, Mrs. Jones recalls becoming ill at a café called Rob's Place and orders her son to destroy him. On match day, Raj confidently taunts Mama's Boy, who attacks furiously. Mrs. Jones then realizes the café was actually Ron's Place and calls off the fight. Mama's Boy throws a tantrum, allowing Raj to win on a technicality. His victory is short-lived when Jungle George challenges him, leaving Raj backpedaling around the ring.
14	14	"Married or Not"	Joel Rosenzweig	Mike Milligan & Jay Moriarty	December 7, 1985
When the Rob's Place softball team schedules a Saturday morning game, Raj cannot attend a special art exhibition with Nadine. He promises a romantic dinner afterward, but after scoring the winning run, Raj agrees to join a victory party at Dwayne and Rerun's apartment instead. Nadine is furious, and a major argument leads Raj to announce at the party that they have split up. Shirley offers to watch Carolyn so Nadine can see a movie with her friend Paulette, who later persuades her to visit a local singles' disco. Meanwhile, the guys drag Raj to the same club. Nadine endures unwanted attention from a persistent "Disco Wolf," while Raj is cornered by Marcie, an astrologist and multiple-divorcee. Spotting each other across the room, Raj and Nadine engage in a silent challenge. Nadine dances energetically with the Disco Wolf, prompting Raj to lead Marcie onto the floor and attempt the same moves. He slides into a wall and injures his leg, and Nadine rushes to his side. They reconcile, and Rerun dedicates a special song to the reunited couple over the DJ's microphone.
15	15	"The Improbable Dream"	Gary Shimokawa	David Silverman & Stephen Sustarsic	December 14, 1985
Everyone in the group faces problems: Dwayne cannot get a date, Rerun cannot sell a car, and Raj has writer's block. Carolyn wants to keep a homeless puppy, Jojo, but Nadine refuses because their yard is unfenced and no one is home to care for it. Believing Nadine is being mean, Carolyn takes Jojo to Rob's Place, but Rerun is allergic to dogs and both Dee and Shirley live in no-pet buildings. Shirley offers to post an adoption ad in the diner's window. While searching for food for Jojo in the kitchen, Carolyn is knocked unconscious by a falling box. She dreams she is in The Wizard of Oz, with Jojo and Munchkins, meeting the Good Witch, the Wicked Witch, and Oz versions of Dwayne, Rerun, and Raj. They seek the Wizard, who resolves everyone else's problems but cannot help Carolyn keep Jojo. The Wicked Witch steals Jojo, and Carolyn wakes to find herself in the diner's kitchen surrounded by friends and a paramedic. Relieved to be home but still worried about Jojo, Carolyn is happy when the paramedic offers to adopt the puppy for his young daughter.
16	16	"Rags to Riches"	Tony Csiki	Barry Gurstein & David Pitlik	January 19, 1986
Rerun hires investment banker J.B. Whitney to manage his money and quickly sees his wealth grow through successful investments. Flush with cash, he buys a paging device, six handmade suits, a mink coat with matching beret, hires a bodyguard, and surrounds himself with trendy new friends. The gang struggles to adjust to this new version of Rerun, especially Dwayne, who feels he is losing a close friend and roommate. One evening at the Thomas house, a TV news bulletin announces that Whitney has fled to Bermuda with all his clients' money. The gang goes to Rerun's lavishly redecorated apartment to break the news, but he accuses them of jealousy and asks them to leave. Later, Rerun receives a call from his broker confirming the loss, and his jet-set friends quickly abandon him. The gang, having waited outside and seen his friends leave, returns to comfort him. Rerun is glad to see them but feels devastated over losing everything. Raj reminds him that at least he experienced his dream, even briefly, and most people never get that far. Rerun agrees, grateful for his true friends' forgiveness and loyalty.
17	17	"Goodbye, Mr. Ripps"	Tony Csiki	Jurgen Wolff	January 26, 1986
When Raj, Rerun, and Dwayne learn that their favorite high school teacher, Mr. Ripps, is retiring, they plan a farewell party and scheme to play a practical joke on him. Initially refusing to participate, Shirley changes her mind after she and Raj are targeted by one of Ripps' exploding cakes. At the party, a tape recorder among the gifts plays a message from a former hoodlum student threatening to send a "farewell present." An armed, masked intruder bursts in and fires at Mr. Ripps, who collapses. The gunman is revealed to be Raj firing blanks, but Ripps remains motionless. His doctor brother pronounces him dead. At the mortuary, Ripps is revealed to be alive, having staged his death with help from his brother and mortician Leon to outdo the gang's prank. When the gang arrives, Leon's son inadvertently reveals Ripps' plan. Anticipating another trick, they pretend to be guilt-ridden over his "death" and crowd around the coffin. As Ripps prepares to leap out, they surprise him, causing him to slam the lid shut. Leon's son then tags the coffin for out-of-town shipment, and the gang celebrates outwitting the self-proclaimed king of practical jokes.
18	18	"Dee and Dwayne"	Gary Shimokawa	Mike Milligan & Jay Moriarty	February 2, 1986
After months without a date, Dwayne suddenly has more girlfriends than he can handle. Unsure whom to take to a Tina Turner concert, he decides to invite Dee, reasoning it is not a real date. Dee agrees, but Raj dislikes the idea of his friend taking out his "baby" sister, especially given Dwayne's reputation as a ladies' man. Shirley, Rerun, and Nadine convince Raj to relax, but when Dee appears smitten the next day, his concerns return. Raj and Dee argue about her dating Dwayne. Later, Dee surprises Dwayne with tickets to a jazz concert, only to find he is expecting another woman. When she arrives, Dee feels embarrassed and angry. Dwayne admits he has a crush on Dee but insists it is better they remain friends and that she stay like a little sister to him. Dee agrees. While Dee is in the bathroom adjusting a contact lens, Raj arrives, believing Dwayne's guest is her. He barges into the kitchen and finds a stranger, then is embarrassed when Dee emerges. Once the misunderstanding is cleared, Dee gives Raj the jazz tickets to take Nadine, while she heads to a disco for the evening.
19	19	"Mr. First Nighter"	Robert M. Priest	Ted Bergmann	February 9, 1986
Raj writes a play and invites the gang to his house for a reading. Exhausted from working at the diner by day and writing at night, he falls asleep during the reading, but they assure him it is wonderful. Raj's agent advises that, without a track record, he must stage a one-night "showcase" to attract producers and publishers. The gang agrees to finance the production, with Raj directing. When temperamental actors quit days before the showcase, Raj's friends volunteer for the roles: Nadine as the playgirl wife, Dwayne as her lover, and Rerun and Shirley as friends and business partners. Raj takes the small role of the husband. Soon, he grows suspicious that they are taking their roles too seriously—Nadine and Dwayne rehearse love scenes privately, Shirley meets with an insurance agent, and Rerun borrows money for gambling. At dress rehearsal, Dwayne brandishes a real gun and the group reveals plans to kill Raj for personal gain. As they corner him, Raj wakes up in his living room—it was a dream. The gang still praises the play and offers to act in it, but Raj insists they never play characters in one of his works.
20	20	"Shirley's Pen Pal"	Robert M. Priest	Cassandra Clark and Debbie Pearl	March 2, 1986
Shirley's pen pal Nate Bailey, a veteran Navy cook, visits after seven years of increasingly romantic letters. Nate is charming and well-meaning but also loud and disciplined, bringing a military attitude to Rob's Place. He rings a ship's bell for orders, makes everyone do basic training, and buys supplies in bulk. While the gang likes him, Raj feels threatened by his overbearing presence. Raj is about to suggest to Shirley that Nate leave when she announces they are getting married. Nadine throws an engagement party, where Nate presents Shirley with a beautiful ring. During toasts, Nate remarks that soon only two people will run Rob's Place. Raj fears he is being pushed out but learns Nate expects Shirley to quit her job after marriage, wanting an "old-fashioned" wife. To independent Shirley, Nate's idea sounds more like a description of a pet than a partner. The couple argues, realizing their love cannot overcome their differences. Nate decides to leave and possibly open a restaurant with Navy friends. When Shirley tries to return the ring, he tells her to keep it as a friendship ring, vowing they will remain close pen pals.
21	21	"Nadine's Boss"	Robert M. Priest	Bob Bendetson & Carol Olson	March 9, 1986
Nadine grows anxious when she learns that "Pink-Slip Patty," an efficiency expert from the home office, is visiting. Remembering the saying "last hired, first fired," she fears for her job. Patty's critical attitude during her inspection does nothing to reassure her. While Nadine is retrieving old case records, Patty notices a Rob's Place flier on the office bulletin board. Though disapproving of unauthorized postings, she is tempted by the lunch special and heads to the diner. There, she encounters Raj, struggling to run the place with Rerun while Shirley is on vacation. Their interaction ends with Raj insulting her, prompting her to leave. Later, Nadine invites Patty to dinner to meet her husband, hoping to smooth things over. When Raj sees Patty from the kitchen, he hides, and Dwayne poses as "Raj." The deception escalates when a reporter arrives to interview the "up-and-coming" writer Raj, forcing Dwayne to answer questions with Raj coaching from the kitchen. Patty eventually discovers the truth, leading to a tense second meeting. With Nadine's job seemingly on the line, Raj and Patty admit they were both wrong and agree to call a truce—at least for dinner.
22	22	"The Wedding"	Tony Singletary	Story by : Mike Milligan & Jay Moriarty; Teleplay by : David Silverman & Stephen Sustarsic	March 16, 1986
Raj and Nadine discover through a telegram from the Connecticut Office of Records that they are not legally married—the preacher who wed them was recently arrested for fraud. They decide to marry again, but this time their friends push for a full wedding instead of an elopement. Rerun and Dwayne compete to be best man, while Shirley organizes a choir. As planning escalates, Nadine feels pressure to invite all their relatives and friends, and Raj becomes overwhelmed by the elaborate arrangements. Frustrated, he declares he just wants to get married, not have a wedding. Nadine misinterprets this as a lack of love, leading to an argument. Raj spends the night on the couch before reconciling with Nadine, and they decide to elope again. When they announce the change of plans, Dwayne, Shirley, and Rerun begin arguing. Meanwhile, Raj and Nadine quietly arrange for Shirley's pastor, Reverend Perry, to marry them on the spot. The ceremony includes an impromptu choir, both Rerun and Dwayne as best men, and ends with singing, dancing, and celebration. Note: This episode marked the final appearance of Fred Berry as a series star; he left before season two began taping and was written out entirely.

=== Season 2 (1986–87) ===
No. overall	No. in season	Title	Directed by	Written by	Original release date
23	1	"Nadine's Surprise"	Tony Singletary	Bob Peete	September 27, 1986
Nadine's friend Melba donates a box of baby clothes to the thrift shop where Nadine volunteers her time. The women discuss having children, and Nadine admits she and Raj are not quite ready for a family—yet. After Melba has gone, Nadine and Raj discuss parenthood, agreeing that they should wait awhile before taking such a big step. While Raj is at work, an unexpected visitor arrives at the Thomas hone. Nadine is pleasantly surprised to find Bill Thomas, Raj's long-lost father, at the doorstep. After a warm greeting, Bill explains that since he's been living in Seattle for many years, he has been unable to visit until now. Nadine invites him to dinner that night. Meanwhile, at Rob's Place, Shirley is having problems with the old, temperamental cooking grill. She tells Raj that the repairman will need to see the grill's warranty papers before he starts to repair it, so Raj hurries home to retrieve them. In the interim, Melba returns to the thrift shop with more maternity clothes. She and Nadine discuss Raj's father making a surprise visit. Raj accidentally eavesdrops on their conversation and erroneously thinks he is going to be a father! He rushes back to the diner to tell his friends. That evening, Raj uncharacteristically brings Nadine flowers. When Nadine realizes that Raj thinks she is pregnant, she begins to explain just as the doorbell rings and Raj's father enters. Raj is very angry at Bill for deserting his family years ago and hastily rushes outside. Because Bill and Raj have been estranged for many years, Bill knows he must now make the most of a precious moment with his son. Standing in the backyard, the two men talk everything out. Bill explains why he left the family years ago, and apologizes. Raj finally gives in and accepts his father's love by welcoming him into his life with open arms.
24	2	"Shirley's Landlord"	Tony Singletary	Larry Balmagia	October 4, 1986
Entering Rob's Place, Dwayne excitedly reports that he is joining the political campaign party for Jerry Schnable—a contender for the state Senate, and proudly displays the contender's poster. Shirley's nearsighted neighbor Minnie rushes into the restaurant to deliver an important letter. Shirley is surprised to read that the new owners of her apartment building have just doubled her rent! Enraged, Shirley vows to discuss this move with the new landlord. That night the management representative, R.J. Sloane, visits Shirley to discuss her rent increase. What seems like an impossible situation quickly changes when he makes her an offer she can't refuse—if she becomes the new building manager, he will lower her rent. Shirley jumps at the offer, but soon finds herself besieged by neighbors with complaints. To worsen matters, Sloane informs Shirley she must evict Minnie. Shirley tries to protest, but is soon quieted when Sloane threatens her with eviction as well. At the restaurant the following day, Sloane hands Shirley two more eviction notices for other tenants. When he leaves, she and Minnie plan a tenant meeting for that night. Angry tenants fill Shirley's apartment as she describes the intentions of the new management. Sloane sneaks in, armed with three more eviction notices for Shirley to execute. Having had enough, Shirley instead quits her manager's job. Suddenly, Raj, Nadine and Dwayne burst in. Nadine has discovered that Senator Hickman, currently seeking re-election, is on the apartment building's board of directors. Hickman's campaign could be damaged if the media found out that innocent people were being evicted unjustly. As a supporter of Hickman's opponent, Dwayne threatens to expose him in time for the evening news if some changes aren't made. Sloane quickly sees the light and retrieves all of the eviction notices and declares there will be no rent increases and reinstates Shirley as the building manager. But Shirley turns the tables on Sloane by refusing the job and then proceeds by making some real complaints of her own!
25	3	"The Movie Deal"	Gary Shimokawa	James Henderson III	October 11, 1986
Nadine comes home to find Raj preparing a special celebration dinner, complete with flowers, candles and champagne. Raj has sold an article to Reader's Digest for $300 and he's also finished revisions on his screenplay about a jewel thief. Nadine expresses envy of Raj 's writing talent and asks him to help her rewrite a case study on homeless women for a funding project. Flattered, Raj quickly agrees. On his way to work, Raj stops off to see his agent, Bernie, and gives him his written script. Bernie later shows up at Rob's Place bearing great news—big-time producer David Ross read Raj 's story and loved it! And he set up a meeting to discuss a possible deal that afternoon at Raj 's house. Bernie feels that Raj could even get a fee in the neighborhood of six figures. As Bernie is on his way out, he mentions that the story on homeless women is brilliant! Realizing that he gave Bernie the wrong manuscript, Raj is in shock, and before he can explain the error, Bernie is gone. When Bernie and Nadine learn that it is Nadine's story that David Ross wants to buy, Bernie convinces the couple to pretend that Raj wrote the story. Ross arrives and they begin to discuss the plot line—he sees the story as a female version of "Rambo"—a group of wayward women who are on special assignment with the U.S. government. When he makes the suggestion that Charo play the lead role, Nadine protests. Raj backs her up, then confesses that it is she who wrote the story. Ross is furious at this deception and storms out, with Bernie following after him, pleading forgiveness. Raj and Nadine agree that Raj should not sell anything he does not believe in. After all, there will always be other "movie deals" in the world!
26	4	"Picture Perfect"	Gary Brown	Steven Kunes	October 18, 1986
As Raj and Shirley work the lunch crowd at Rob's Place, Dwayne enters urgently seeking Raj. Dwayne informs Raj that he has a hot tip on investing in a new artist named Michael Sitaris. He also tells Raj that Sitaris' showing features a nude and that the model looks exactly like Nadine! Dwayne shows Raj a photograph of the painting and Raj confirm that it does look like his wife, but he can't believe that it could actually be her. Later that evening, Raj decides to confront Nadine. She openly states that she knew Sitaris and admits that she posed nude for him when they were art students years before. Raj begins accusing her of doing more than just posing for Sitaris. Nadine insists that he's jumping to conclusions. A quarrel ensues as the two interrogate each other about past relationships. The next day at the diner, Raj, still angry from the night before, goes "crashing" about the kitchen. Shirley and Dwayne encourage him to discuss the situation. They try to make him understand that the past is over and that he has no reason to suspect that Nadine is keeping something from him. Raj is still not convinced and decides to try to "squeeze" the truth out of Sitaris. Later, Nadine stops by Sitaris' gallery for a visit and her old friend is glad to see her. As they reminisce, Sitaris convinces her, for old times sake, to pose far another portrait—this time fully clad in a Victorian dress. As Nadine changes her clothes, Raj and Dwayne sneak into the gallery, disguised in western attire. They find Sitaris and attempt to get him to confess that he does more than just paint his models, but they don't get the answer they've come for. As they begin to leave, they hear Nadine's voice from a dressing room. Sitaris tells Nadine hat she looks "like a vision." Shocked, Raj's worst nightmare has come true. Unable to stand the agony any longer, he bursts through the artist's backdrop and threatens Sitaris with a fist fight. Suddenly Raj turns to Nadine and sees that she is fully clothed. Embarrassed, he apologizes to Sitaris. Later at the diner, Nadine recounts the day's activities to the gang, but admits that it was her fault for playing games and making Raj jealous in the first place. Sitaris stops by to give Nadine the painting that he had promised her. Raj, worried that the gang is about to get a private showing of his wife, throws himself protectively in front of the painting. When the paper covering is removed, Raj sheepishly backs away, realizing that it's silly to hide an artistic portrait of his wife...wearing a red dress!!
27	5	"Raj's Nightmare"	Gary Brown	Barry Gurstein & David Pitlik	October 25, 1986
When Raj announces that he's taking a weekend fishing trip, Nadine is quick to quell his enthusiasm by reminding him that he had promised to attend a wedding with her. Raj protests and glibly excuses himself from the argument. While he's out of the room, Nadine's mother drops in for a surprise visit. Raj returns to find his worst nightmare, his mother-in-law, in the house. Later, Raj and Nadine argue about his "less than affectionate" attitude about her mother and they strike a deal; if Raj agrees to be nice to her mother during her three-day visit, Nadine will allow him to go on his fishing trip. Lunchtime at the diner finds Raj and Dwayne going over the details of their trip when Nadine and her mother drop by. This presents a perfect opportunity for Mrs. Hudson to get her jabs in at Raj. Raj's patience wears thin, but he maintains his temper and agrees with everything his mother-in-law says. Two days later, Mrs. Hudson prepares to leave. Raj is relieved and in a last effort to prove how nice he can be, expresses how he wishes she could stay longer. Mrs. Hudson agrees and sets her suitcases down, announcing she will stay another week! Raj is frantic. Nadine reminds him that the deal was made for the duration of her mother's visit and Raj agrees to keep his end of the bargain. As the weekend approaches, Raj is in good spirits as he works at the diner. Meanwhile, Nadine arrives home and notices Raj's fishing gear still laid out. When she asks her mother why Raj's gear was still there, Mrs. Hudson explains that a man claiming to be Dwayne's cousin stopped by to pick up the gear for a trip this weekend. She told the young man that there must have been some mistake, since Raj agreed with her that fishing is stupid. She also said that Dwayne's cousin had phoned to say that Raj's place on the trip had been filled. Back at home, Raj is furious when Nadine breaks the news to him. He goes to give Mrs. Hudson a piece of his mind, but she's suddenly so sweet to him that he backs down. Nadine is proud of Raj and promises to make it up to him when they have the house to themselves. As they're making plans for the weekend, Dwayne shows up unexpectedly to tell Raj that he knew there had been a mistake. Raj still has a place on the boat, and his long-awaited trip is on!
28	6	"Party Animal"	Gary Brown	David Silverman & Stephen Sustarsic	November 8, 1986
At Rob's Place, Shirley and Raj are cleaning up the afternoon dishes when Dwayne bursts in with exciting news. They are disappointed to learn that it's no more exciting than his being awarded a parking space after one year with the company. Dwayne decides to celebrate and invites his friends to party that night. Shirley ungraciously bows out and Raj confides that he can't make it because Nadine has to stay home and work. Unable to understand Raj's situation, Dwayne tells Raj that he is no longer the "fun" guy that he used to be and that he has become "dull and predictable." Shirley is quick to agree and they continue to prod Raj. Nadine arrives and when she hears Raj's reason for declining the invitation, she calls him a sweet, considerate and responsible man and encourages him to go. Not liking to be called "responsible," Raj relents. The party is in full swing when Marcia, a beautiful young woman, introduces herself to Dwayne. Suddenly, Raj bursts onto the scene, tossing party hats at the guests who are understandably stunned. Embarrassed, Dwayne leads Raj to the refreshments and offers him some punch. Anxious to prove that he's an unpredictable party animal, Raj spices things up by changing the music and grabbing a surprised guest to dance. As other couples join in, Dwayne clears the room and in doing so, switches the position of two punch bowls. A thirsty Raj unsuspectingly drinks several cups of spiked punch thinking it was the "safe" punch. Raj wakes up in Dwayne's bedroom the following morning with a massive hangover and notices a sleeping figure beside him. He reaches for a clock and realizes he's been out all night. Panicked, he shakes Dwayne and is shocked when Marcia's head emerges from under the covers, and she flashes him a big "good morning" smile. Raj rushes to find Dwayne in the living room and is confused as Dwayne recounts the details of the previous evening. Marcia comes out of the bedroom, kisses Raj on the cheek and leaves Raj and Dwayne in shock as she exits. Raj tries to explain but he can't remember the night before. He feels guilty and wants to tell Nadine, but Dwayne encourages him not to. Raj returns home to confess to Nadine and tells him that she's glad he had fun and thanks him for being thoughtful enough to call and tell her that he wasn't coming home. Marcia stops by to return the wallet that Raj had left in her car the night before and explains that the night before was perfectly innocent. It had been too late for her to go home so she went to sleep in Dwayne's bedroom and Raj must have come in and passed out. As for the kiss, she explains that he was terrific at being the life of the party.
29	7	"Shirley's Little Sister"	M. Neema Barnette	Sam Greenbaum	November 15, 1986
As Shirley struggles with the after-school crowd at the diner, Nadine drops by to tell Raj about a new family in the neighborhood she has been working with. Nadine is concerned with the eldest daughter's shyness, so she has enrolled the girl in the Big Buddy program. Unfortunately, there is a waiting list. So Nadine and Raj decide to ask Shirley to be the girl's Big Buddy. Begrudgingly, Shirley agrees. Over the next several days, Shirley and Paula became good friends. Paula is beginning to overcame her shyness and Shirley is enjoying helping her out. Paula expresses a desire to go to a school dance, but is worried that no one would want to take her. Shirley encourages her to ask a boy herself. To assure that Paula gets a date, Shirley bribes Eric, a regular customer at the diner, by giving him free food for a month if he accepts Paula's invitation. Paula has no idea that this arrangement has been made and is thrilled that the most popular boy at school is taking her to the dance. Shirley means well, but her plan backfires when Raj discovers the enormous tab that Eric has been running up and he exposes the deal in front of Paula. Feeling betrayed by her best friend, Paula vows never to see Shirley again and runs out of the diner in tears. Later, Shirley and Paula accidentally run into each other at the Thomas' home. They both apologize for the way they behaved and agree that they are still friends. When Paula returns to the diner the next day, she meets a new boy, Howard, who ends up asking her to the dance.
30	8	"Raj's Big Break"	Robert M. Priest	Stephen Langford	November 22, 1986
One morning as Raj and Nadine fantasize about the lifestyle they could have if Raj gets a publishing deal for his new book, the mailman arrives with some bad news. Another publisher has turned the book dawn. At the diner later, a woman enters and introduces herself as Dolores Hasset from a prominent publishing company. She claims she is a big fan of Raj 's work and offers him $50,000 for an advance on publishing rights. The gang is, of course, thrilled with Raj 's success. Dolores leaves behind her card and tells Raj that her boss, Mr. Kessel, will be contacting him soon to finalize the deal. The following day, Dr. Kessel arrives at the Thomas' home to tell Raj that he is not Dolores' boss, he is really her psychiatrist: Dolores suffers from delusional tendencies. She does work for the publishing company, but in the mailroom. Later as Nadine, Dwayne and Shirley try to cheer Raj up, another publisher calls with a real offer of $2,500, which Raj gratefully accepts.
31	9	"Thy Boss's Daughter"	Robert M. Priest	Story by : Bernard Burnell Mack; Teleplay by : Sam Greenbaum	December 6, 1986
As Raj and Shirley close the diner, Dwayne comes in and proudly introduces Saundra, the new girl he's been dating. As the conversation progresses, Raj and Shirley discover that Saundra's father is Dwayne's boss! As time goes on, Dwayne and Saundra keep steady company. Dwayne confides to Raj and Nadine that although she means well, Saundra is becoming too possessive. She decides where they go, when and with whom. She even tells him what to wear. Raj and Nadine encourage Dwayne to confront Saundra before it gets out of hand. Dwayne agrees and as he begins to tell her, Saundra interrupts him and lets it "slip out" that her father is considering a promotion for him. She also makes it very clear that the promotion is a result of her influence with her father. Dwayne, with the promotion as an incentive, changes his mind and continues to acquiesce to Saundra. Several nights later, Raj has invited same close friends over for a birthday party for Nadine and Dwayne brings Saundra, who has forced him to wear an embarrassing sweatshirt prominently labeled "I'm Hers." Saundra is aloof and judgmental all evening. Rambozo, an actor hired to entertain at the party, is very well received by the party guests and the birthday girl. Saundra, however, is NOT amused. She thinks Rambozo is distasteful. When she finds out that Dwayne hired the actor, she's furious and insists that they leave. Dwayne wants to stay to celebrate his friend's birthday and a huge argument ensues, ending with Saundra storming out. The next day, Saundra's father, Mr. Wiggins, comes into Dwayne's office to tell him that he's not being promoted. Dwayne mistakenly thinks he's being fired because of Saundra. But Mr. Wiggins explains that Dwayne is not being promoted, instead, he is being given a raise. Dwayne lets out a sigh of relief and vows to himself never to mix business with pleasure ever again.
32	10	"Cabin Fever"	Robert M. Priest	Story by : Maiya Williams; Teleplay by : Larry Balmagia	December 13, 1986
When Raj's sister Dee comes home from college for a three-day weekend, the gang decides to take a trip to Lake Arrowhead. Raj and Dwayne want to stay in town for a Friday night football game, so Dee, Nadine and Shirley decide to head out on their own and join up with the guys the next morning. Nadine navigates as Shirley drives through the dark, winding roads on the way to the lakes. Nadine realizes that she's had the map upside down for several miles. They turned left when they should have turned right. The paved road becomes a bumpy dirt road that ends abruptly at a tree. Shirley's car dies as they try to turn around. The radio broadcast is interrupted by a bulletin announcing that "Dog Face" Williams, a convicted killer, has escaped from prison and is on the loose in the Lake Arrowhead area. Unable to start the car, the three begin to walk back to the main road. After they have gone, a dark, hooded figure approaches the abandoned car and makes an attempt to start it. The figure pockets the keys before leaving the car. As the girls walk, they come across a cabin in the woods. They figure it's deserted because the lights are out. A torrential rain begins as they enter the cabin. They build a fire in a wood stove and as they wait out the storm, they each confess their greatest desire in life. Nadine wants to dance the role of the dying swan in Swan Lake and Shirley wants to sing like Aretha Franklin. Their mood is shattered by Nadine's sudden scream, She has seen a man's face in the window. Convinced that it's "Dog Face," they prepare to jump him as he enters the cabin. They douse the light and pounce on the figure as it cares through the door. When Dee turns the light back on, they discover that they have jumped the forest ranger who had come to deliver Shirley's keys and assist them with a tow truck.
33	11	"Instant Family"	Arlando Smith	Brian Pollack & Mert Rich	December 20, 1986
Dee fills in as a waitress at the diner while Raj and Shirley are at court fighting a trumped-up lawsuit. When they return, Shirley is surprised when Dee tells her that an old, dear friend, Sylvia Grant, stopped by while Shirley was out and said she would come back later. Shirley panics and tells Raj, that while she and Sylvia were growing up, Sylvia was always better than Shirley at everything. Now as adults, Sylvia has a good job, a lovely home and a great husband and children. Shirley feels like she has nothing in comparison. Raj convinces Shirley that she's doing pretty well too and she shouldn't feel that she won't measure up to her friend. Shirley confesses that in her last letter to Sylvia she lied and said that she had a husband and two children. When Sylvia shows up later, Shirley begs Raj to pretend to be her husband since Sylvia is only going to stay for 20 minutes. Raj agrees and everything goes smoothly until Sylvia announces that she's decided to stay overnight and she would love to come to Raj and Shirley's home for dinner. In order to accommodate Shirley's lie, Raj goes out and "rents" two children for the evening from some friends. The plan almost works until Nadine returns home early, after being away on a business trip. Nadine is confused to find her house filled with strange people. Shirley is forced to explain to Sylvia that she lied in her letter so that Sylvia would think she was successful too. Sylvia assures Shirley that they are friends and she would be proud of Shirley no matter what she did. Shirley realizes that success isn't measured by money or power, her friends are what matter the most.
34	12	"Old Army Daze"	Phil Olsman	James Bartruff	January 10, 1987
Raj is working on an article about bodybuilding and interviews two muscle men in the diner. Meanwhile, Dwayne and his friend Randy enter, marching to a military cadence. Dwayne introduces Randy as his best friend from the army—they did everything together in boot camp. Randy even saved Dwayne's life by pushing him out of a live mine area. Randy has been discharged from the army and plans to live with Dwayne for an undetermined amount of time. A week later, Dwayne and Randy literally burst through the Thomas' front door having just returned from a paramilitary weekend. Typically, Randy comes on strong; flirting with Nadine and making himself at home. The conversation progresses and Randy invites Raj to join a poker game at Dwayne's. Later that night, Randy shows off his poker skills. Raj wants to put him in his place and realizes a perfect opportunity when he draws four aces, so Raj assigns a "no limit" on the game, allowing the stakes to go as high as the players want. When Randy bets his new car, Raj figures he is bluffing and he bets his car and his half of the diner. Randy lays down a straight flush and takes the pot that includes Raj's business. After the game, Raj returns home and breaks the news to Nadine and Shirley, explaining that a poker game has the same code of honor as a gentleman's handshake and therefore, Randy won the diner fair and square. Dwayne, meanwhile, tries to convince Randy to give the diner back. Randy won't budge and as they argue, the truth comes out—Randy cheated. Randy says it can't be proven because the game is over so the diner is his. Dwayne kicks him out of his apartment. The next morning, Dwayne tells the whole story to Raj and Shirley and they devise a plan to trick him into giving back the diner. In a card game, Shirley insists that it be winner takes all. Of course, Randy wins and Shirley signs over her half of the diner to him. As she does that, Raj's bodybuilder friends show up and pretend to be hit men for a loan shark. They have come to collect $20,000 outstanding on a loan for the diner. The owner had better pay up now or else! Raj and Shirley explain that Randy is the owner now and as the two men start to carry him off, Randy tears up the ownership papers and runs out. Raj and Shirley have their diner back...and Shirley gets a date with one of the bodybuilders.
35	13	"The Yard Sale"	Tony Singletary	Michael S. Baser & Kim Weiskopf	January 17, 1987
Nadine and Raj plan to hold a big yard sale in an attempt to clear out their garage and earn some money besides. Raj feels that since the old cartons are filled only with obsolete items of another time it would be beneficial to get rid of them all. Nadine and Raj begin to browse through the boxes and they uncover treasures such as Raj's old teddy bear, love letters and special cologne. Dee unexpectedly arrives home for the weekend and wonders what's going on, especially with her teddy bear! Through a series of flashbacks, Raj and Dee reminisce about their lives growing up. Their stories include funny moments with Mama and Rerun, as well as with Dwayne and Shirley who also join in with their storytelling. Raj comes to realize that these old possessions trace the history of his life and he decides that they still hold too much sentimental value to part with any of them after all.
36	14	"Dwayne's Amiga"	Gary Shimokawa	Migdea Chinea-Varela	January 24, 1987
While visiting Dee at college, Dwayne meets and falls in love with Marisol, a beautiful nurse from El Salvador who is studying in the United States. Dee invites Marisol to spend Thanksgiving at her brother Raj's home. During the time she is there, Dwayne and Marisol keep steady company and fall more and more in love. Dwayne confides in Raj that he has met his match and plans to ask Marisol to marry him. As Thanksgiving dinner is being prepared, Dwayne pops the question to Marisol and is surprised when she turns him down. She tells him that she loves him but she has received a call from her clinic in El Salvador. Fighting in the country has increased and they need every available nurse. She promises Dwayne that when the war is over she will return and marry him. Several weeks later, Dwayne is helping Raj and Nadine decorate for Christmas when Raj gets a call from Dee. Dee passes a message that her university has received news of the war in El Salvador. Raj hangs up and informs Dwayne and Nadine that fighting had erupted in Marisol's town and she was killed while evacuating children from the clinic. A senseless war had come home to Dwayne.
37	15	"Sorority Sisters"	Art Washington	Sara Finney & Vida Spears	January 31, 1987
Raj is busy writing a poem for a poetry competition the following night, when Nadine informs him that Dee and her friends from college are expected for the weekend. Dee is pledging a sorority and the two girls are her big sisters in the sorority. At the diner the next day, Raj excitedly reports that famous Shakespearean actor, Thaddeus Birdwell, is to read the poetry in the competition. Dee enters with big sisters Karen and Jackie. They order salads and tell Dee to stay at the counter to collect them. Shirley is shocked at the way Dee is being treated. Over in the corner, Jackie and Karen speak in hushed tones of their plan to put a roach in Dee's salad. When the salad is served, Dee screams. The customers are alarmed and they exit as Jackie and Karen laugh. Raj is incensed and chastises them for behaving like children and makes them clean up the entire restaurant to make up for the loss of business they caused. The "big sisters" feel humiliated and make a silent vow of revenge. Later, as Raj is putting the finishing touches on his poetry, Karen and Jackie appear on the stairs with their luggage and laundry. When Nadine asks why they are leaving, they reply that they would be taking advantage of their stay because of the trouble they caused at the diner earlier. Raj accepts their apologies and invites them to his competition. When Raj goes upstairs to prepare, Jackie and Karen take the envelope containing his poetry and substitute one of their own. They tell Dee that they aren't allowed to socialize with pledges, she will have to stay home and do their laundry. At the competition, Thaddeus Birdwell reads the poem substituted by the girls, as the audience sits in shocked silence. Back at the house, Dee finds the real poetry and rushes to the theatre. She produces the envelope containing Raj's poetry. Karen and Jackie leave and spot Dee standing by the dessert table. As they threaten to bar her from the sorority, Dee grabs two cream pies and pushes there into their faces. Later as Dee and Nadine try to cheer Raj up, Z.Z. Hicks, the poet who won the first place prize, shows up. He tells Raj that his poetry was clearly the best in the competition and wants him to have the first prize ribbon. When Nadine asks if he is going to give Raj the $500 prize money, Mr. Hicks replies that he is a poet, not an idiot!
38	16	"Mad Money"	Arlando Smith	Noni White & Bob Tzudiker	February 7, 1987
When Nadine goes off in secret to plan a cruise for her and Raj, Raj suspects that she is having an affair.
39	17	"Dee's Suitor"	Arlando Smith	Stephen Sustarsic	February 14, 1987
When Dee comes home from college, she is aggressively pursued by a nerdy guy who will not take no for an answer.
40	18	"I'll Be Homeless For Christmas"	Judi Elterman	Stephen Langford	February 21, 1987
After Raj kicks a homeless man out of the diner, he has a dream that he is homeless and the homeless man is married to Nadine.
41	19	"Taking The Rap"	Robert M. Priest	Bob Peete	February 28, 1987
After the new diner down the street begins to take customers away from Rob's, Raj hires a young rap group (L.A. Dream Team) to try and lure them back.
42	20	"Opening Day"	Mike Milligan	Jay Moriarty & Mike Milligan	March 7, 1987
After learning that the Little League team from Rob's Diner will be facing off against their longtime rival (Meshach Taylor), Raj and Dwayne begin to focus the team more on winning at all costs and less on having fun.
43	21	"Raj On The Double"	Tony Singletary	Scott Rubinstein & Leonard Mlodinow	March 14, 1987
When Raj's lookalike cousin escapes from prison, he heads straight to Raj and Nadine's house to avoid detection. There is plenty of confusion when even Nadine cannot tell them apart.
44	22	"The Housekeeper"	Tony Singletary	Stephen Sustarsic	March 28, 1987
Feeling sorry for an Arctic woman (Teresa Ganzel) who was jilted by her beau, Raj and Nadine hire her as their housekeeper. They soon realize that she is not cut out to be a maid and try to reunite her with her beau.

=== Season 3 (1987–88) ===
No. overall	No. in season	Title	Directed by	Written by	Original release date
45	1	"Ask Al"	Tony Singletary	Stephen Sustarsic	September 26, 1987
While having breakfast at the diner, Mr. Beckmire, publisher of a local newspaper, observes Shirley as she works. Watching her interaction with both customers and friends, Beckmire notices that she has a knack for giving advice. After explaining who he is, he offers Shirley the opportunity to write the "Ask Al" advice column in his paper with the condition that she keeps "Al's" identity a secret. When Beckmire names the right price, Shirley accepts. Several days later, Shirley's first column appears in the paper. She proudly passes out papers to Nadine and other customers in the diner and encourages everyone to read "Ask Al." The topic of the column is a letter from a young girl calling herself "Livid Linda," whose boyfriend teases her incessantly about her belief in astrology. Al's response is "Tell that turkey that your new sign is Do Not Disturb." Shirley is proud of herself until Dwayne comes in and announces that his new girlfriend dumped him and told him that her new sign was "Do Not Disturb!" Nadine hands him the "Ask Al" column and he's furious. He calls Al every name in the book and then tears out of the diner and heads for the newspaper office with the intent of ripping Al's lips off. Shirley is miserable about breaking Dwayne and Linda up and decides to take a try at straightening things out. She calls Linda at work and tries to explain, but Linda doesn't believe that Shirley is really "Ask Al." What's worse, Linda thinks that Shirley is a friend of Dwayne's and that Dwayne put her up to posing as "Ask Al" as a tactic to win her back. Desperate to get Dwayne and Linda back together, Shirley calls Beckmire and begs him to meet her at Linda's work to explain who "Al" really is, but he refuses. Dwayne and Linda don't believe Shirley either but they think it was a nice gesture on her part to pretend to be the columnist and try to patch things up between them. Dwayne and Linda agree to get back together and everyone is happy—except Shirley. Beckmire fires her on his way out the door. This is the first episode in which Ernest Thomas doesn't appear, his absence was explained as Raj being in Australia on a book tour.
46	2	"The Boxer"	Arlando Smith	David Pitlik & Barry Gurstein	October 3, 1987
Dwayne is at the diner with Raj and Shirley when their old friend Henry stops by and introduces the gang to Tiger Sanchez, a new boxer that he's been training. Tiger is planning to go professional and Henry has agreed to work with him once he finds some financial backing. Raj pulls Dwayne aside and asks him if he'd be interested in investing in Tiger. Raj has visions of being a big-time investor—getting rich and famous as Tiger becomes middleweight champion of the world. When Nadine comes home he casually brings up the subject. She suggests the stock market, but Raj thinks it's too unstable. He picks up a sports magazine on the coffee table that just happens to be laying on the coffee table and just happens to open, to an article about two boxers and their $11 million fight. Raj shows the article to Nadine and asks her if she thinks it sounds like a good investment. She says she can't understand how people could throw away money on something so barbaric. Disappointed, Raj tells Nadine that he's going to the gym to work out and heads off to break the bad news to Dwayne. At the gym, Dwayne and Raj meets Bubs, a big fight promoter who has come to watch Tiger spar. Bubs says he needs a replacement fighter for a fight he has lined up and if Tiger is ready to turn pro, he can be entered. Raj and Dwayne jump at the chance for a piece of the action—Raj figures he will just tell Nadine after Tiger has won. A week later, Shirley and Nadine are going to the movies when Raj claims to be going to the gym to work out. Nadine notices that Raj forgot his gym bag and she and Shirley take it to him at the gym. When they arrive, Nadine is surprised to find the place full of boxers. They run into Henry who introduces himself as Raj's partner and Nadine becomes furious. Raj spots Nadine and finding there's no place to hide, puts on boxing gloves and headgear and disguises himself as Tiger's sparring partner. Nadine recognizes him, however, and yells out a distraction. When Raj turns to see what's going on, Tiger throws a punch that knocks Raj out. Mad at Tiger for hitting her husband, Nadine climbs into the ring and throws a punch, knocking Tiger out! Later while Nadine puts an ice pack on Raj 's head, Dwayne comes by to give Raj a check for his half of the investment. Tiger won't be fighting anymore. He had a "glass" jaw that Nadine broke when she decked him!
47	3	"The New Employee"	Gary Shimokawa	Larry Balmagia	October 10, 1987
Shirley is working the diner's cash register while several teenagers sit at the counter filling out job applications. Maurice (Martin Lawrence in his first acting credit), also a teenager, enters the diner surreptitiously stashing Shirley's "Help Wanted" sign in his coat. He quickly surveys the situation, then approaches a boy at the end of the counter and tips him off that the place down the street is offering $20 an hour and a company car. The kid passes this information dawn the line and all the job applicants pour out of the diner. Maurice then convinces a hesitant Shirley to hire him. As far as Shirley can see, Maurice is working out well. He has only been working for several days, but his buddies, Willie and Daryl, have already adopted the diner as their hangout. One afternoon as the guys are hanging around, Maurice's heartthrob, Michelle, comes in and orders a take-out lunch for her boyfriend. Maurice makes a play for her, but she is unimpressed. She brags about how perfect her pre-med boyfriend is—he gets tickets to any concert or gets into any club. Desperate to impress her, Maurice invites Michelle to his club. He explains that by day, "Rob's Place" is an ordinary diner, but by night, it's "Club Maurice." She agrees to stop by that evening. Begrudgingly, Willie and Daryl agree to help Maurice transform the diner into the hottest teen club in the city. They beg, borrow and rent every piece of sound and lighting equipment they can find and convince Nadine and Shirley to leave the diner early. Unaware of Maurice's plans, Shirley thinks he is just trying to be helpful by offering to close up. Pleased by his initiative, she leaves. That night, "Club Maurice" is in full swing when Michelle and her boyfriend Gary arrive. Willie "bounces" Gary, and Maurice offers Michelle a private tour of the place. As they dance to a record that D.J. Daryl is playing, Nadine and Shirley, looking for a late-night snack, walk in. Shirley is furious and drags Maurice into the kitchen for a heart-to-heart talk. They explain to him that relationships cannot be based on deception and he should just be himself. Shirley agrees not to fire him if he tells everyone in the club the truth. When he breaks the news to Michelle, she is touched that he would go to all that trouble for her and she dumps Gary and stays at the diner with Maurice.
48	4	"The Hat Comes Back"	Gary Shimokawa	David Pitlik & Barry Gurstein	October 17, 1987
The gang makes an inventory of the items they have collected for the charity auction, commenting, with just a trifle of sarcasm, about the modern-art painting Dwayne is donating. Nadine pointedly reminds Shirley and Raj their contributions are yet to be made. They promise Nadine that they'll come through for her. Raj and Shirley desperately ask for suggestions to fulfill their promise to find something extra special for the auction. An excited Daryl informs Maurice that he's lucky enough to have gotten tickets for the two of them to a concert by Sharona—one of the hottest shows on the circuit! While disappointed that Daryl's big surprise wasn't a date with Marcy Brown, he's nevertheless pleased to be able to go to the event. Shirley off-handedly mentions that she knows Sharona's manager, having gone to school with him. In a burst of inspiration, Raj and Shirley decide to approach him to obtain one of Sharona's hats for the auction. Pushing their way through the crowd, Raj and Shirley gain entrance when she's recognized by Grover who reminisces about some of the good old days and gives them a hat. Back at the diner, a somewhat awed Maurice offers to take care of the hat while Raj and Shirley leave to pick up her car from the garage. When Marcy Brown comes in to eat and rebuffs Maurice's overtures for a date, he can't resist bragging about his connection with Sharona, offering her a peek at the hat as proof. The hat is torn in half in the ensuing tug-of-war for its possession. A dismayed Maurice decides that he has to try to replace it before Nadine arrives and Shirley commits bodily harm to him! Rebuffed by the guard at the hotel, the two disguise themselves as a bellboy and maid; announcing 'room service' they gain admittance. Just when success seems in their reach, Shirley arrives. It seems that when she and Raj tussled over who was to show the prized hat to Nadine, it tore and they thought they had caused the damage. Shirley recognizes Maurice and Daryl through their disguises and their story is revealed. Because the auction is for a good cause, Sharona enters and graciously donates not only a replacement, but another four hats as well. Thanks to her generosity, the auction is a smashing success and Maurice and Daryl are paying for their mistake by cleaning the diner.
49	5	"Dwayne's Big Step"	Gary Shimokawa	Story by : Marley Sims and Elyse Wakerman; Teleplay by : Stephen Sustarsic	October 24, 1987
Dwayne and Shirley are chatting in the diner when Mr. Higgins, owner of a neighboring magic and novelty shop, drops by to tell them that he's selling his shop and retiring to Hawaii. As he performs a few final magic tricks far Shirley, he and Dwayne reminisce about the days when Dwayne worked in the magic shop. After Mr. Higgins leaves, Dwayne complains to Shirley that his current boss, Mr. Walker, is tough to communicate with, but he nonetheless plans to ask him for a promotion or a raise. As Nadine enters the diner, Dwayne asks her if she thinks he's too easily intimidated. She responds by imitating a squawking chicken, Nadine and Shirley agree that Dwayne needs to learn has to go after what he wants. They convince him to take an assertiveness training course. That same night, Dwayne begins his assertiveness training. In the manner of a marine sergeant, the instructor uses Dwayne in a role-playing experiment to show the class that success is not earned—it's demanded. The next day, Dwayne decides to try his training out on his boss. He invites Mr. Walker to the diner where he plans to ask for a promotion. With his newly acquired confidence, however, Dwayne comes on too strong and Walker fires him on the spot. Devastated by the loss of his job, Dwayne takes a new job as a traveling carpet cleaner salesman. When he tries his sales pitch on Nadine and Shirley, he ruins Nadine's new rug with his faulty carpet cleaning machine. Convinced that he will never hold a job that he enjoys, he gives up the carpet cleaning business. Dwayne is moping around the diner the following day when Mr. Higgins comes in and announces that his deal to sell the magic shop fell through. He's in a real bind because he and his wife are due to move to Hawaii in several days. Nadine and Shirley realize this is the perfect opportunity for Dwayne. Dwayne has always loved the magic shop, and he's always wanted to be his own boss. As they are trying to convince Dwayne to buy the shop, Mr. Walker comes into the diner and offers Dwayne his job back. But Dwayne turns him down and makes the decision to go into business for himself by buying the magic shop.
50	6	"Girls' Night Out"	Phil Olsman	Mark Tuttle & Barbara Berkowitz	October 31, 1987
It's Dee's twenty-first birthday and she wants to do something special. Raj and Dwayne plan to go bowling so it gives the girls the perfect opportunity to go to Nottingham's -- a male strip club. Raj isn't thrilled with the idea, but the more he protests, the more it makes the girls want to go. Raj and Dwayne stop by the diner later to wind down after bowling. The diner is closed but a police officer stops by when he sees the lights on. Raj gives him a cup of coffee and the officer tells them about the raid planned for that night. It seems a lot of underage kids are getting into clubs and they are starting to crack down. Tonight the raid will be at Nottingham's. After the officer leaves, Raj panics. The girls are at Nottingham's but Dee won't be 21 until midnight, so they race for the club to try and warn her. The girls are enjoying the show at Nottingham's, especially Shirley. When Raj and Dwayne arrive, they are unceremoniously removed from the club by a brawny bouncer who grumbles that the club is for ladies only. The direct approach doesn't work so they decide to sneak in through the dancer's entrance. Before they know it, they are on stage, barely dressed as an Indian and a construction worker. The crowd is screaming for them to take their clothes off. Dwayne starts to get into it when women begin throwing money at him and he starts making a tidy sum of money. Raj strips his costume off feather by feather. They know it is just a matter of time before Nadine, Shirley and Dee spot this, but it's too late, the police arrive and drag everyone off to jail. Back at the diner, Dee confesses that it is the best birthday she's ever had. She was arrested for being underage and Raj was arrested for being underdressed! Dee got lucky however, the raid didn't start until after midnight so she was already 21.
51	7	"The Candidate"	Arlando Smith	Michael S. Baser	November 7, 1987
While working at the diner after school, Maurice notices gorgeous Judy Anne, a bespectacled intellectual-type who is pouring over her books while he pours on the charm. But she deep-freezes every effort he makes to get her attention. Daryl is not quick with advice. He's too busy bragging about the grade he received for his brilliant essay that he wrote about Maurice. As Daryl gushes about Maurice, Bob Bledsoe comes into the diner. Bob is on the campaign trail. He's running for class president and wants to hang one of his posters up in Rob's Place. Shirley is worried about giving equal space to his opponent, but Bob lets her know in no uncertain terms that he has no opponent. No one will ever run against him because he always wins. Maurice and Daryl go on about haw conceited Bob is and at this point Judy Anne speaks up. She thinks Maurice would be perfect to run against Bob. She even offers to be his campaign manager, which would mean that they would have to spend a lot of time together. Maurice agrees to run. Daryl is very supportive of his best friend's campaign, but Judy Anne on the other hand has been pushing Maurice. She tells him what to say and when and where to say it. Things are going well but, like every candidate seeking a high office, there are skeletons in Maurice's closet. As it turns out, Judy Anne and Bob used to go steady. She has something to prove and she's going to do whatever it takes to prove it. She has Maurice doing everything she says, including dumping Daryl as his best friend, because he just doesn't fit Maurice's new image. Judy Anne sets up a debate between Bob and Maurice. She has prepped Maurice to answer predetermined questions. He becomes distracted however when he sees Daryl in the audience wearing a sweatshirt that says "Vote For Maurice." Even though they are not best friends anymore, Daryl still thinks Maurice is the best candidate and continues to support him. As the debate wears on, he realizes that every word he's saying was put in his mouth by Judy Anne. They don't reflect his own views and opinions. As he speaks he sees Daryl's disappointment. He stops using Judy Anne's words and says what he really feels and starts by telling Judy Anne what he thinks of her and her manipulation tactics, then heads out to go to a baseball game with his best friend Daryl.
52	8	"Family Life"	Gary Shimokawa	Shirley Brown	November 14, 1987
When Nadine asks Shirley how many tickets she'll need for the Junior League banquet, Shirley tells her one, since she recently broke up with her boyfriend. Shirley tells the gang that she's worried about never finding a man. She's looking for a commitment and wants to raise a family. Nadine offers to fix her up with Raymond, a brother of one of her co-workers and Shirley agrees to give it a try. A few nights later at Shirley's apartment, everything seems to be adding up to a perfect date. Raymond is handsome, intelligent and charming. As he's in the bathroom washing up, he tells Shirley that he believes in old-fashioned values. She agrees and is surprised when he comes out of the bathroom wearing little more than a smile and she kicks him out. Next, Dwayne convinces Shirley to try a computer dating service where she finds Greg. His computer profile shows that he likes good food so she invites him over for dinner. They start a conversation about how much they love children. Shirley wants two or three kids—Greg wants ten or fifteen. She kicks him out. Now it's Dee's turn. She says the supermarket is the place to meet men and sends Shirley shopping where she meets Stan. Stan has all the outward signs of being a perfect man, but he's divorced. Everything Shirley does seems to remind him of his wife and the memories cause him to burst into tears. She kicks him out too. As he's leaving, her new neighbor, Adam, stops by to introduce himself. Shirley gives him the cold shoulder and sends him away then heads for the couch and falls asleep. While she's asleep, Shirley has a nightmare about her life 30 years later. She is still unmarried with no family. Nadine's son, Raj Jr., is a Harvard graduate, Dee is a U.S. Senator and the mother of twins and Dwayne gets married once every year. She is visited by a beautiful little girl who tells Shirley that she is one of the 2.3 little Shirleys that she never had. She shows her photos of the things they never did together, the husband she never had and the house he didn't buy her. She wakes up screaming. As she awakens, there is a knock at the door. Adam heard her screaming and came over to see if she was alright. They begin talking and she offers to show him around town…setting a date to go out the next evening.
53	9	"Running Scared"	Arlando Smith	Jay Wolf	November 21, 1987
Raj and Dwayne enter a 10K race for charity. Raising money to save a neighborhood park is not their only goal. They entered to compete against each other to prove who is the better athlete. In the days preceding the race, Raj and Dwayne each knock themselves out trying to get in shape, but neither let on to the other that they need any training at all. Even with all of his training, Raj is a little nervous that Dwayne is going to win so he buys a little insurance in the form of a gorgeous girl named Samantha. Raj's plan is to place Samantha, wearing a sexy running outfit, in a strategic spot on the race route. When she sees Dwayne, she will pretend to drop a contact lens. Dwayne, who can't resist a beautiful damsel in distress, will naturally stop to help her out. When he does, Raj will zip past him and gain a strong lead. Meanwhile, Dwayne has a plan of his own. He pays a couple of huge guys named Chuck and Biff to run side by side at a slow pace and literally block Raj from gaining any ground. On the day of the race, Dwayne's plan is working. Raj is hopelessly stuck behind Chuck and Biff. Dwayne has a nice lead until he encounters Samantha. Raj is able to trick the big guys into taking a detour and zips past Dwayne. Moments later, Dwayne finds Raj on the side of the race route with a sprained ankle. Raj tells him to go ahead and finish the race since beating each other was the only reason for running the race. Dwayne feels terrible that Raj is hurt and confesses to hiring Chuck and Biff to block him. Raj confesses that he hired Samantha and they both admit that it was pretty dumb to test their friendship that way. Dwayne offers to help Raj walk to the finish line but when he stops to pick up Raj's glasses, Raj takes off running toward the finish line without him.
54	10	"Nadine's Wood-Be Father"	Gary Shimokawa	Deborah Jones	November 28, 1987
Nadine is nervous about her mother's impending visit of a week and wants everything about the visit to be perfect. Ever since Nadine's father died, her mother has been very depressed and withdrawn. It's hard far Nadine to make her happy. Shirley assures her that everything will be fine. When her mother arrives, she looks extremely happy and invigorated. She tells Nadine that she has brought her friend Lynn to join them for the week. Nadine is happy that her mother has a close friend to travel with until she sees that Lynn is a man. When her mother announces their plans to get married, Nadine, in a private conversation, tells her mother that she is crazy to marry a man she barely knows and they are not welcome to stay in her home. Meanwhile, Shirley thinks Lynn, a ventriloquist, is a great guy and invites him to perform at a party that she is having at the diner for underprivileged kids, to which he accepts. Shirley then tries to get Nadine to come around and to let her mother and Lynn stay with her. But Nadine is adamant. She thinks her mother is betraying her father by marrying again even though her father has been dead more than five years. She further tells Shirley that it is none of her business and kicks her out too. At the diner later, the party is in full swing. Dwayne has finished performing a string of lousy magic tricks and Lynn and Chip are doing their routine. Nadine enters and takes a seat in the back of the room. When Lynn starts taking questions from the audience, Nadine stands up and asks him if he's ever opened his mouth and had the wrong words come out—because lately some really stupid things had been coming out of her mouth. He tells her that is the life of a dummy and urges her to apologize to her mother, which she does...welcoming Lynn into the family.
55	11	"The Pad"	Arlando Smith	Marley Clark & Stephen Sustarsic	December 5, 1987
Raj's friend Lou stops by the diner to take Raj to bowling practice. Lou is HUGE. With the "Rob's Place" logo embroidered on his bowling shirt, he looks like a walking billboard. He towers over Raj, dwarfs Dwayne and is able to lift a bowling ball in one hand without using the holes. Daryl sits at a table reading "How To Be A Love God in Ten Easy Lessons." Maurice thinks that nothing, especially a book, can help Daryl's sex appeal. Daryl offers to demonstrate the technique and approaches two girls who, in spite of Daryl's blundered line, invites him to sit down. The girls are sisters and they are freshmen at UCLA. Maurice edges his way into the conversation and before he knows it, he's told the girls that he and Daryl are sophomores studying pre-med at UCLA. By the end of the conversation, he has told them that he and Daryl have their own apartment and the girls have invited themselves over. Now the guys are in trouble. The problem is easily solved when Dwayne comes in. They convince him to let them use his apartment for "studying" while he is bowling with Raj and Lou. The girls shows up later and Maurice and Daryl are the perfect hosts. When they all decide they want Chinese food for dinner, the guys leave to get it. While they are gone, Dwayne and Raj show up—coming home early from bowling. It's not long before they all realize that they've been lied to, and put their heads together to come up with a plan for revenge. When Maurice and Daryl return, the lights are out and the apartment appears to be empty. They figure that the girls gave up and went home. However, when the girls emerge from the bedroom barely wearing a couple of men's shirts, the guys realize that they are in over their heads when their guests announce their plans to spend the night. As the guys sputter out some lame attempts to get out of the situation, the doorbell rings. It's Lou pretending to be the girls' father. The girls tell their "dad" not to worry, the boys aren't doing anything indecent. In fact, they say Maurice and Daryl plan to marry them. This makes dad very happy since he just happens to be a minister and can perform the marriage ceremony. As Maurice and Daryl drop to their knees and beg for forgiveness, Raj and Dwayne come out from where they were hiding. The game is over and the boys have learned a lesson about lying.
56	12	"Teacher's Threat"	Ginger Grigg	Sam Greenbaum	December 12, 1987
Raj tells the gang that he got a call from Mr. Ratliff, their old teacher. He was the toughest teacher they ever had. Maurice tells them that he still is tough. In fact, Maurice has a math test in his class the following day. Mr. Ratliff's daughter is visiting for a week and he wants her to make some new friends while she is in town. Maurice figures that if he is nice to Mr. Ratliff's daughter, the teacher might be grateful when it comes time to grade his test. Mr. Ratliff comes to the diner with his daughter Diana, who is a shy, frumpy girl with glasses. Maurice tells him that he would like to show her around, but he has to study for the test. But Mr. Ratliff has the perfect solution—Maurice and Diana can study together. Diana excuses herself to go to the restroom and emerges as a completely different person once her father is gone. In fact, she is stunning and she certainly has no interest in studying—all she wants to do is party! Maurice shows up at the diner the next day dead tired. He tells Raj that he was out dancing until three o'clock in the morning, which explains why he slept through his math test. Mr. Ratliff enters and tells him that he got an "A" on the test. As it turns out, he let Diana grade the test papers. When Maurice tells Diana that he's too tired to take her out dancing, she threatens to tell her father the truth. Diana soon has Maurice running ragged and sleeping on the job. Diana blackmails Maurice into having dinner with her at her father's house. When he shows up, he finds her in a revealing dress. She tells him not to worry, her father is at a faculty meeting and won't be hone for hours. Suddenly, there is a knock at the door and Maurice quickly hides in the closet. It's Diana's father who explains that the meeting was cancelled. He crosses to the closet to hang up his coat and finds Maurice. Mr. Ratliff is furious and tells Maurice that he will deal with him at school. Mr. Ratliff and Diana come to the diner the next day and he tells Maurice that he knows the truth. He and his daughter had a long talk and have come to know each other a little better. He's going to let Maurice take a make-up test and Diana is going to tutor him.
57	13	"Daddy's Back"	Pat Fischer-Doak	Sara V. Finney & Vida Spears	December 19, 1987
Shirley is surprised when she is named "Business Woman of the Year" by her community. As she describes the plans for the pending award banquet to Nadine, her father, "Duck" Wilson, walks through the door of the diner. He is a truck driver and his route has brought him through town for the first time in years. After the usual catching up, Shirley invites him to the banquet. He accepts and then takes Dwayne, whom he took an immediate liking to, for a ride in his truck. While they are gone, Shirley fills Nadine in on her relationship with her father. Duck always wanted a son and never quite got over the disappointment Shirley turned out to be a girl. When Duck and Dwayne return, Shirley invites her father and the gang over for dinner. Shirley is thrilled that her father is coming over and she and Nadine prepare his favorite meal. When Dwayne shows up with a C.B. radio that he and Duck bought, a message comes over the radio for Shirley from Duck. Unfortunately, he won't be able to make it over for dinner because he is going to a basketball game instead, leaving Shirley crushed. At the diner the following day, Shirley is rehearsing her acceptance speech when Duck comes by. He tells her that he won't be able to attend the banquet because he has to drive to Buffalo and needs to leave right away. Shirley is miserable and Dwayne wants Duck to know how bad she feels and he secretly rigs his C.B. radio to transmit their conversation so that Duck can will overhear it. With encouragement from Nadine and Dwayne, Shirley discusses her feelings—going on to admit that she feels like a stepchild and how much she wants her father's approval. All the while, she has no idea that Duck is hearing what she is saying. Later that night as she is getting ready to go to the banquet, Duck drops by to see Shirley. He admits that when he heard her "broadcast," he turned around and came back to escort his daughter to her award banquet.
58	14	"I Gotta Be Raj"	Arlando Smith	Story by : Migdea Chinea; Teleplay by : Carolyn Krebs & Charlotte Thomson	January 16, 1988
For Raj's birthday, Dwayne has painstakingly assembled an album of photos that chronicle Raj's life. After stopping by the diner to show the book to Shirley, he heads for the airport to pick up his girlfriend Debbie. On the sidewalk outside of the diner, a kid on a skateboard runs into him and knocks him unconscious. When he wakes up, he thinks he's Raj! Later, Nadine is readying the house for a surprise birthday party for Raj. As Shirley tries to explain to Nadine what happened, Dwayne shows up. Still thinking he's Raj, he opens all of Raj's presents and then chases Nadine around the house trying to show his gratitude to his "beautiful wife." In the diner that afternoon, Dwayne is still out of his mind and is making Nadine, Shirley and Dee lose theirs. Nothing is helping him to come out of it. Not even Debbie who has just arrived from the airport where she has been waiting for Dwayne to pick her up. When Dwayne doesn't recognize her, it of course makes her angry but it gets worse when he introduces her to his wife. He pulls Nadine over to him and gives her a big kiss. Nadine hauls off and hits him, which causes him to snap out of it. He recognizes Debbie but when he introduces her as his girlfriend, she corrects him with ex-girlfriend and then slaps him, sending him reeling back into his "Raj" mode. He sees Nadine and goes for a kiss again and she gives him a real slap, which jars him back to being Dwayne again. He moves for Debbie who, calling him a two-timing louse, slaps him again and he turns back onto Raj. He starts for Nadine again but Shirley, determined to unscramble Dwayne's brains, decks him. It works and returns him to being just plain Dwayne, forever.
59	15	"Run, Shirley, Run"	Ginger Grigg	Shirley Brown	January 23, 1988
Election Day is coming around again, so Councilman Bell decides to place a visit to Raj's diner. His reception is anything but civil especially as far as Shirley is concerned. She accuses him of not keeping all his campaign promises from the last election. He also happened to catch her on the day she bent her fender on a pothole that his road department neglected to repair. Bell's assistant, Thurston, tries to calm her down to no avail. After the Councilman and Thurston leave, one of the customers, Briggs, suggests that Shirley run against Bell. Raj tells her that maybe one day she will even become president. This causes Shirley to begin daydreaming. In Shirley's dream, Nadine, her chief of staff, tells her that her popularity rating is higher than ever. Shirley attributes it to the fact that she was able to get rid of income tax and unemployment. But Shirley isn't as concerned with her popularity as she is with what time she gets to review the troops. When Raj is announced as her vice president, he complains that he doesn't have anything to do. Then he makes references to the fact that he wants to get rid of her. Except for Raj, Shirley's presidency seems too good to be true. Coming out of her daydream, Shirley announces her intention to run in the election. They are all surprised when Councilman Bell arrives to apologize to everyone. He realized that he somehow forgot all the reasons he wanted to be elected in the first place. He tells them he is going to fix all the potholes and then admits that Thurston talked him into it when he fell into one of them and broke his leg. Bell tries to get Shirley to campaign with him, but she's decided that politics aren't for her. After the Councilman leaves, Raj tells Shirley that he wished she had not changed her mind about-running. Shirley remembers how Raj was in her dream and to everyone's surprise she accuses him of using her and trying to get rid of her.
60	16	"The Older Woman"	Art Washington	Pam Veasey	January 30, 1988
Dwayne has met the perfect woman. Her name is Helen and she's a terrific dancer, has a great sense of humor, and a wonderful smile. There is just one slight problem...she's an older woman. For that reason, Dwayne has decided to stop seeing her. Raj tells him that age doesn't matter. Some of the best things in life improve with age, such as wine and cheese. He tells Dwayne that if he really loves Helen, he won't break up with her. Dwayne thanks Raj for the advice. That night, Nadine comes by the diner and Shirley tells her all about Dwayne and Helen. When Dwayne stops by to thank Raj for setting him straight, he mentions that he's taking Helen to dinner at Dicato's. Nadine, curious to catch a glimpse of Helen, talks Raj into taking her to Dicato's for dinner. Raj and Nadine enter the restaurant and see Dwayne sitting with an elderly woman. They can't bear to watch another minute and leave before being seated. The moment they exit, Helen, who is two years older than Dwayne, joins him and her grandmother at the table. Raj blames himself and decides to tell Dwayne he was wrong about Helen. He and Nadine try to talk to him, but he tells them he's in love with her. In fact, Dwayne wants them all to meet her and has stopped by to invite them over for dinner. When they arrive at Dwayne's house, he informs then that Helen will be a little late. He suddenly remembers that he was supposed to get ice cream and rushes off to the store. As soon as he leaves, Helen's grandmother arrives. She tells them that she's been married four times and is looking forward to getting married again soon. Raj and Nadine are now more determined than ever to stop Dwayne from making a terrible mistake. Just then, much to their relief, Dwayne and Helen enter together. Raj and Nadine can't tell her how glad they are to meet her!
61	17	"Happy Face"	Gail L. Bergmann	Kitty Felde	February 19, 1988
A surly Shirley insults everyone within earshot at the diner while an amused bystander looks on. He approaches Raj and reveals himself to be Barry Smith, host of a local news show. He informs Raj he would like to do a spot featuring Shirley's unique way of dealing with customers. Asked about what preparations need to be made, Raj is told to make sure Shirley is rude and acidic—her usual personality. Shirley tells Raj the real reason for her unhappiness at the moment is the picture of Cynthia Daville on the society page of the paper—the two had been bitter enemies in school. Dwayne suggests Shirley should accompany him to a seminar on positive thinking. She sits and listens in growing disgust at the gushing testimonies of others in the group. As she rises to leave, Dr. Yess thinks she wants to make a statement and calls on her for comments. When the doctor promises relief from feeling that one's social life is a zero, Shirley reluctantly resumes her seat, joining in with the group. A newly reformed Shirley is driving everyone crazy with her positive routine. When Raj tells her to make a choice between the new guru and the diner, he is shocked at her decision—she hands him the apron and sets off to find Dr. Yess and turn over her half of the diner. Thinking to head her off, Raj and Nadine invite Cynthia over, sure that the old enmity will be rekindled when Shirley faces her. To their mutual surprise, Shirley remains cool under all their goading and actually apologizes to her old enemy. The gesture breaks down Cynthia's resolve and she confesses that everything's wrong in her life and she's totally miserable. The scheduled taping of the segment at the diner had slipped Raj's mind until the arrival of the camera crew. While Barry tries to get Shirley's sharp tongue wagging, she refuses to be baited and reacts kindly to every request, totally undermining his billing of her as the town's rudest waitress. Dr. Yess arrives and is introduced to the TV host who thinks they may have met before. While Shirley excuses herself to sign the contract with Dr. Yess, Barry remembers where he had run into the con man before—he had done a piece on another scam operated by the good doctor in another city. The two force a showdown and Shirley learns the truth just in time. Feeling very sheepish, she goes back to her old insulting ways—but not before accepting a date with the broadcaster.
62	18	"The Fabulous Fortunes"	Mike Milligan	Bob Peete	February 26, 1988
Freda Fortune, an old friend of Shirley's, is catering a big affair in Malibu and her client wants her to serve gumbo. It just so happens that gumbo is Shirley's specialty and Freda stops by to ask her to come by the house and help her whip up a big batch. Freda and her husband Dewey are raising their two grandchildren Joyce and Brian after their parents were killed. Shirley arrives at the house just in time to learn that Brian has a small problem. Joyce tells her that he is not going to attend his eighth grade dance because he doesn't know how to slow dance with a girl, so Shirley volunteers to teach Brian herself. Brian's dance lesson is a complete disaster—and Shirley has the bruised toes to prove it! Brian is so discouraged that he runs away from home, taking nothing but his basketball. Because Dewey and Freda had an act where they sang and danced, Brian is convinced that they are disappointed in him. Dewey stops by the diner to tell Shirley that Brian is gone and she insists on helping him to locate the missing youngster. When they return to the house, Freda and Dewey blame each other for not paying enough attention to Brian. But Shirley tells them that it is no one's fault...kids do silly things and Brian is just a kid. Shortly after Freda and Dewey kiss and make up, Brian comes home. He had been off shooting baskets all night. He tells Dewey and Shirley that he is not going to the dance. Shirley convinces him that dancing is just like playing basketball and Dewey encourages him to simply pretend that he is playing against him. In no time at all, they are moving together perfectly. On the way to pick up Brian's date for the dance, Brian stops by the diner. He has come to give Shirley a rose and to thank her for all her help.
63	19	"Shirley's Debt"	Phil Olsman	Daryl G. Nickens & Mike Scott	March 5, 1988
While watching TV one night, Raj and Nadine happen to see a commercial for Circus City stores. The announcer states that anyone who gets a gold star on their receipt will win a trip to Hawaii. Nadine tells Raj that she's in desperate need of a vacation. Things have been going pretty well at the diner, that Raj is convinced he will be getting a big bonus. With that money, he promises to take her to Hawaii. When it comes time to hand out the bonuses, Dwayne tells Raj that Shirley has borrowed so much from the cash register that she's spent both of their bonuses. If he wants his money, Raj will have to get it from Shirley. She tells Raj to go ahead and book his trip, she will get him the money. Shirley goes to an employment agency and gets a job as a salesperson at Circus City. She is dressed as a clown and given the name Twinkle Toes. There she learns that a midget clown made a thousand dollars in commission last week. Unfortunately, the other clowns are so aggressive that Shirley has a tough time making a single sale. When Shirley is about to give up, in walks a timid man who's just won the lottery. As it turns out, he is a compulsive spender. After listing off all the items he wants, the midget clown steps up and asks him how much Shirley is charging to help him. The midget clown tells the compulsive spender that he will charge a hundred dollars to wait on him. Naturally, the man can't resist the offer. Raj and Nadine enter the store to buy new luggage for their trip and find Shirley dressed as a clown. She confesses that she has been working there in order to pay Raj the money for his vacation. Raj and Nadine tell her to forget about the money. Shirley is so glad to hear this that she quits her job. Her boss tells her that is fine, but she will have to pay for the clown nose. She pays the money and gets a gold star on her receipt!
64	20	"Man In Motion"	Gary Shimokawa	Story by : David Braff; Teleplay by : Julie Meehan, Cindy Nixon & David Braff	March 12, 1988
Dee grumbles about school being more fun than working in her brother's diner during a break while Shirley refuses to let Maurice punch out early to see his cousin's comedy act at the Laff Riot. A man in a wheelchair enters and the gang soon realizes that it's Maurice comedic cousin Reggie. It's an awkward moment for everyone but Reggie as the others don't quite know how to react or respond to his acidic jokes about his handicap. Just as Dee is coming out of the kitchen with a loaded tray of dishes, Reggie does a racing spin and scatters dishes everywhere. But she succumbs to his charm and makes a date for that evening following his act. Four evenings later, Dee and Reggie have a quiet moment to reflect on how much they are enjoy each other when Reggie sadly reminds her that he spends so little time in one place, making it difficult to establish any kind of relationship. At the diner later, Dee's romance is discussed and Shirley expresses her displeasure at Dee's continuing morning tardiness. When the culprit arrives, late again, she surprises them all by asking for her paycheck in advance, informing them that she is leaving with Reggie after his final performance that night! Raj's attempts to talk some sense into his sister ends in failure. Sensing that Reggie's mobility is the reason for his disapproval, Raj insists that he thinks Dee should finish her schooling, she's so close to being through. Determined to find out how Reggie feels, Raj arrives at his dressing room and is startled to learn that leaving had been all Dee's idea, Reggie feels that it isn't wise just as his own career is beginning to take off. He tells Raj that he will tell her the truth in the morning—Maurice arrives with the news that the bags are in the car ready to leave immediately after the show. The reality of his intentions stuns Raj and he says Reggie's real handicap is his cowardice if he won't face the moment. Dee is oblivious to Raj's attempts to warn her as they watch the show until Reggie throws in some new material that really hits home. She heads back to the dressing room, catching Reggie as he frantically tries to get out before her arrival. For once his timing is off and he has to say something which he knows will hurt. When he insists that Dee only wants to be with him because she likes being needed, she counters with the fact that she likes him for himself. Finally, they reconcile to being friends.
65	21	"Members Only"	Pat Fischer-Doak	Story by : Stephen Langford & Maiya Williams; Teleplay by : Maiya Williams	March 19, 1988
When Raj expresses his intent to join the Livingston Club in order to further his writing career, Nadine gets upset because of the club's discriminatory policy of being a men-only club. Raj is unable to understand her views and he is unable to find anything in the brochure about membership policy so he smugly informs Nadine that of course they admit women. Still disbelieving, Nadine agrees to put it to the test—they will both fill out membership applications. A few days later at the diner while Dee is speculating about a career change into the field of philosophy, Raj breezes in and airily announces that he has been accepted for membership in the snooty Livingston Club. Nadine glumly adds that her application had been rejected and once again insists that her sex is the only reason since her qualifications are just as impeccable as her husband's. An acrimonious debate follows with the guys insisting that men and women should have their separate outlets and the women countering with their disbelief at hearing such sexist opinions. After Raj swears that he would never join a discriminating club, Nadine decides to gather the proof her husband needs. In the disguise of a man, Nadine lets Shirley in on a secret—she had submitted another application identical to the first one with one major difference and now she's on her way to the acceptance luncheon at the club. As she enters, Nadine, ala Biff Ricker, is handed a strong drink and cigar along with an introduction to Raj. As the newcomers are getting acquainted they are treated to an extremely blatant sexist men-only conversation and with growing dismay Raj learns that the club is indeed a playground for men using the pretext of business dealings as an excuse for getting away from their wives at home. Nadine is elated when she hears Raj express doubts about joining such an organization and she plants a big kiss on her surprised spouse, behavior that earns her immediate dismissal as a prospective member. She pulls off the mustache disguise and contentedly leaves, knowing Raj indeed meant what he said when he stated his principles.
66	22	"The Adventures of Kangaroo Kincaide"	Phil Olsman	Marley Clark and Stephen Sustarsic	March 26, 1988
As Nadine looks on, Raj completes packing the assembled camping gear as he tries to explain that his assignment is to write about how a city couple copes with life in the wild. Besides, Shirley and Dwayne will also be along. Their preparations are interrupted by the arrival of Raj's outback guide fresh from Australia, Kangaroo Kincaide, who earned his name as a professional kangaroo boxer. Announcing that he's hung up his gloves, the visitor states his intentions of seeing something of the city. At the diner to meet Shirley and Dwayne, Kincaide intimidates a surly customer by stabbing his rib order with an outsize hunting knife. Raj and Nadine worry when they return home that evening to find their home full of strangers, guests of the Aussie who's picked then up off the street, the two girls promising him a good time. Of course, the overture is misunderstood. Dismayed, Nadine asks what they can possibly do to save their house as well as face since Kincaide feels he has a debt to pay for Raj's saving his life while on an outing in his homeland. In a moment of inspiration, Raj includes his guest along on the camping trip. Everyone is assigned a chore and after the group disperses, Raj and Dwayne go over their plan—Dwayne is to don a bear costume and threaten Raj. Once Kincaide thwarts the attack, the debt will be satisfied and Kincaide will be on his way. As Dwayne takes a break, a real bear shows up and Dwayne scampers away. Before he can issue a warning, Raj proceeds blithely to orchestrate the routine. When the girls return he proudly demonstrates how well Dwayne did his role. When Dwayne stumbles into the campground, they ask him to take a picture of them all. Realization dawns and at the sound of their combined shouts, the bear scampers off into the woods just as Kincaide returns. The plan once again goes awry when the real bear once again usurps Dwayne. Faced with the prospect of a real threat, Raj suggests that Kincaide try his boxing prowess. After the bear sends him sprawling, he asks for another quick idea. In a burst of inspiration, Raj suggests that he try his never-fail singing routine, after all, Raj adds, he had even seen a platypus fall under the spell. The plan works and everyone breathes a sigh of relief as both Raj and the bear collapse in a slumbering heap.
