= Danielle Spencer (American actress) =

American actress and veterinarian (1965–2025)

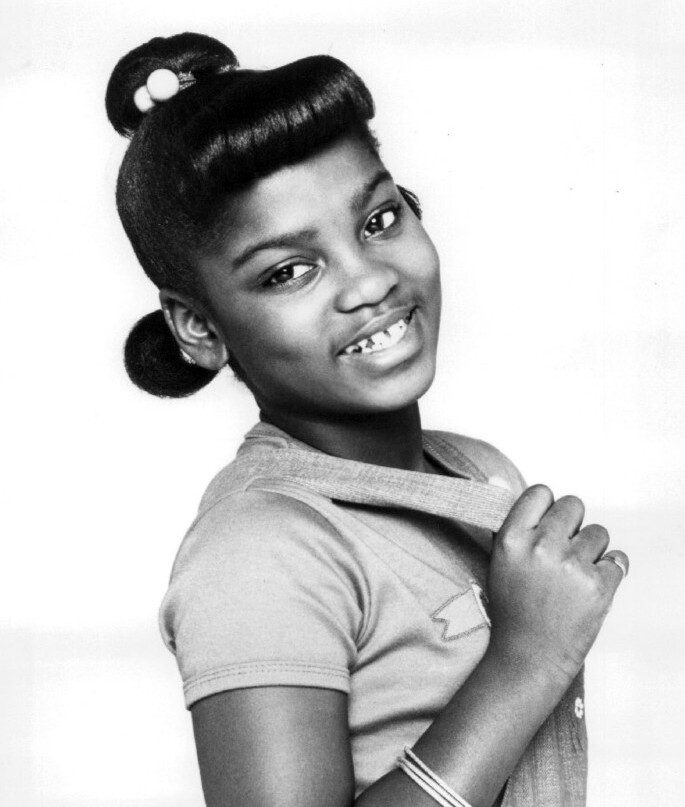
- Spencer in 1977
- Born: Danielle Louise Spencer; June 24, 1965; Trenton, New Jersey, U.S.
- Died: August 11, 2025 (aged 60); Richmond, Virginia, U.S.
- Other name: Danielle Spencer-David
- Education: UCLA (BS); Tuskegee University (DVM)
- Occupations: Actress; veterinarian
- Years active: 1976–1988; 1997–2001; (acting)
- Spouse: Garry Fields (m. 1999; div. 2013) David L. David (m. 2014)

Danielle Louise Spencer (June 24, 1965 – August 11, 2025) was an American actress best known for her role as Dee Thomas on the ABC sitcom What's Happening!!, which ran from 1976 until 1979. She reprised the role on the series' sequel, What's Happening Now!! After her acting career, Spencer became a veterinarian.

== Background ==
Danielle Louise Spencer was born on June 24, 1965, in Trenton, New Jersey, to James and Cheryl (née Smith) Spencer. Her parents separated when she was young, and Spencer considered her mother's next husband, Tim Pelt, to be her father. She grew up in the Bronx, New York.

== Career ==
Spencer became an actress around the age of eight and began taking acting classes. In 1976, Spencer was cast as younger sister Dee Thomas on the show What's Happening!!, which was loosely based on the film Cooley High. The show was a summer mid-season replacement, but performed so well in its time slot that a full season was ordered.

On September 6, 1977, during the production of the second season episode "Trial and Error," Spencer and her stepfather Tim Pelt were involved in a severe car accident that left Spencer in a coma for three weeks and caused Pelt's death. Pelt's fatal injuries were caused by trying to protect Spencer during the crash. Spencer had no memories of the accident and spent six months recuperating with physical therapy.

After the cancellation of the show in 1979, Spencer and her mother relocated to the Ivory Coast for a time. Upon her return, she attended the University of California-Davis to earn a degree in veterinary medicine, a pursuit that was encouraged by her late stepfather. As syndicated reruns of the 65 What's Happening!! episodes had done well, in some markets eclipsing the show's ratings during its network run, in 1985 a sequel series was created called What's Happening Now!!. Spencer played Dee in various episodes over the sequel's three-season run while attending college. She earned a bachelor's degree in marine biology from the University of California, Los Angeles. While in her sophomore year, she pledged and became a member of the Delta Sigma Theta sorority. After What's Happening Now!! was canceled in 1988, she earned a doctorate degree in veterinary medicine in 1993 from Tuskegee University Veterinary School in Alabama. She became a veterinarian in 1996.

Spencer made occasional acting appearances afterward. In 1997, she portrayed a veterinarian in the hit film As Good as It Gets and appeared in Peter Rabbit and the Crucifix in 2001.

The cast of What's Happening!! was honored at the 2006 TV Land Awards, where Spencer was the co-winner (along with Little House on the Prairie actress Alison Arngrim) of the "Character Most in Need of a Time-Out" award.

Spencer released a book about her life as a child star titled Through the Fire: Journal of a Child Star. The book led to renewed interest in Spencer's life and career, and led to appearances on shows such as The Wendy Williams Show, TV One's hit series Life After, and Unsung Hollywood with other former cast members.

== Personal life and death ==
Spencer married Garry Fields, a marketing manager and her publicist and manager, in Marina Del Rey, California, in 1999. The couple divorced in 2013. In 2014, Spencer married David L. David, an entrepreneur from New Jersey she was introduced to by Ernest Lee Thomas.

In 2004, Spencer experienced balance and chronic pain issues and was diagnosed with spinal stenosis as a result of the injuries from her 1977 car accident. A surgery to correct the problem left her partially paralyzed for eight months. Spencer received treatment at the Kessler Institute for Rehabilitation in New Jersey; she credited the institute with giving her life back to her.

Spencer was a veterinarian, initially in Santa Clarita, California, before moving to Richmond, Virginia, in 2014, to be closer to family. In Richmond, she hosted segments about pet care for morning newscasts on WTVR-TV.

In a 2012 interview with People, Spencer credited her own battle with spinal injury and paralysis with changing her perspective on the treatment of animals from simply alleviating their pain to finding the underlying cause of their problems.

In 2014, Spencer was inducted as part of the permanent exhibition of the new National Museum of African American History and Culture. She is the only former child actor who holds this honor. She also became involved in fashion design and debuted her "Dani Collection" line, which was patterned after her own style of dress.

=== Illness and death ===
Spencer was diagnosed with breast cancer in September 2014. Speaking out for Breast Cancer Awareness Month, Spencer told Black America Web that her diagnosis took her by surprise. "With everything that I've been through with the spinal cord injury, I said I know God is not going to give me another affliction," she said, "so I was completely shocked when the doctors told me." Though the news came as a surprise, Spencer said the disease runs in her family. "I have a lot of help and support around me," she said. Spencer stated that she was considering her treatment options, with surgery at the top of the list. "I'm trying to get as many opinions as possible but it does look like that is what I'm going to do," she said. "Hopefully after that there won't be any chemotherapy or radiation involved."

In 2018, Spencer underwent emergency surgery to relieve bleeding in her brain.

Spencer died from stomach cancer at Chippenham Hospital in Richmond, Virginia, on August 11, 2025, at the age of 60.

== Filmography ==
=== Film ===
Year	Title	Role	Notes
1997	As Good as It Gets	Veterinarian	
2001	Peter Rabbit and the Crucifix	Veterinarian	Short film

=== Television ===
Year	Title	Role	Notes
1976–1979	What's Happening!!	Dee Thomas	63 episodes
1977	The Brady Bunch Hour	Dee	Episode: "Episode #1.7"
1978	Special Treat	Emma Sheridan	Episode: "The Tap Dancing Kid"
1985–1988	What's Happening Now!!	Dee Thomas	16 episodes
2001	Days of Our Lives	Salem Place Vendor	Episode: "Episode #1.9023"
