= Migdia Chinea Varela =

American screenwriter

Migdia Skarsgård Chinea Varela
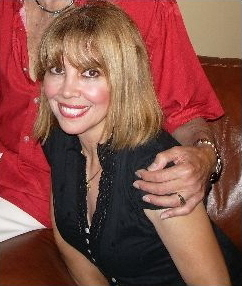
- Migdia Skarsgård Chinea Varela
- Other name: Migdia Chinea
- Occupations: screenwriter, director, producer, production designer, (former actress).
- Years active: 1971-present
- Website: http://theprinceofoldhavana.com

Migdia Skarsgård Chinea-Varela (also credited as Migdia Chinea) is an American screenwriter and director She was a writer for the TV series Superboy, as well as for The Incredible Hulk, The Facts of Life, and Punky Brewster. She appeared in the second season of Sanford and Son as Maria Fuentes, the younger sister of Julio Fuentes, in the 1973 episode "Watts Side Story". She has written about theatre for the Los Angeles Times She lives in Glendale, California.

In 2012, Skarsgård-Chinea graduated with a master's degree from the UCLA School of Theater, Film and Television. She wrote and directed the short film Anonymous (Street Meat) as part of an experimental film course. The four-minute film, which is based on her experiences with faulty mortgage foreclosure notices, was selected un certain regard to appear at the Cannes Short Film Festival and earned an honorable mention at the California International Shorts Film Festival. After the film's reception at Cannes, Chinea told The Daily Bruin that she hoped to be able to film a full-length version.

Her film The Kninth Floor was a final selection at the 2012 Philip K. Dick Science Fiction Film Festival. It was also screened at the 2012 Cyprus International Film Festival. and the 2012 Los Angeles Polish Film Festival.

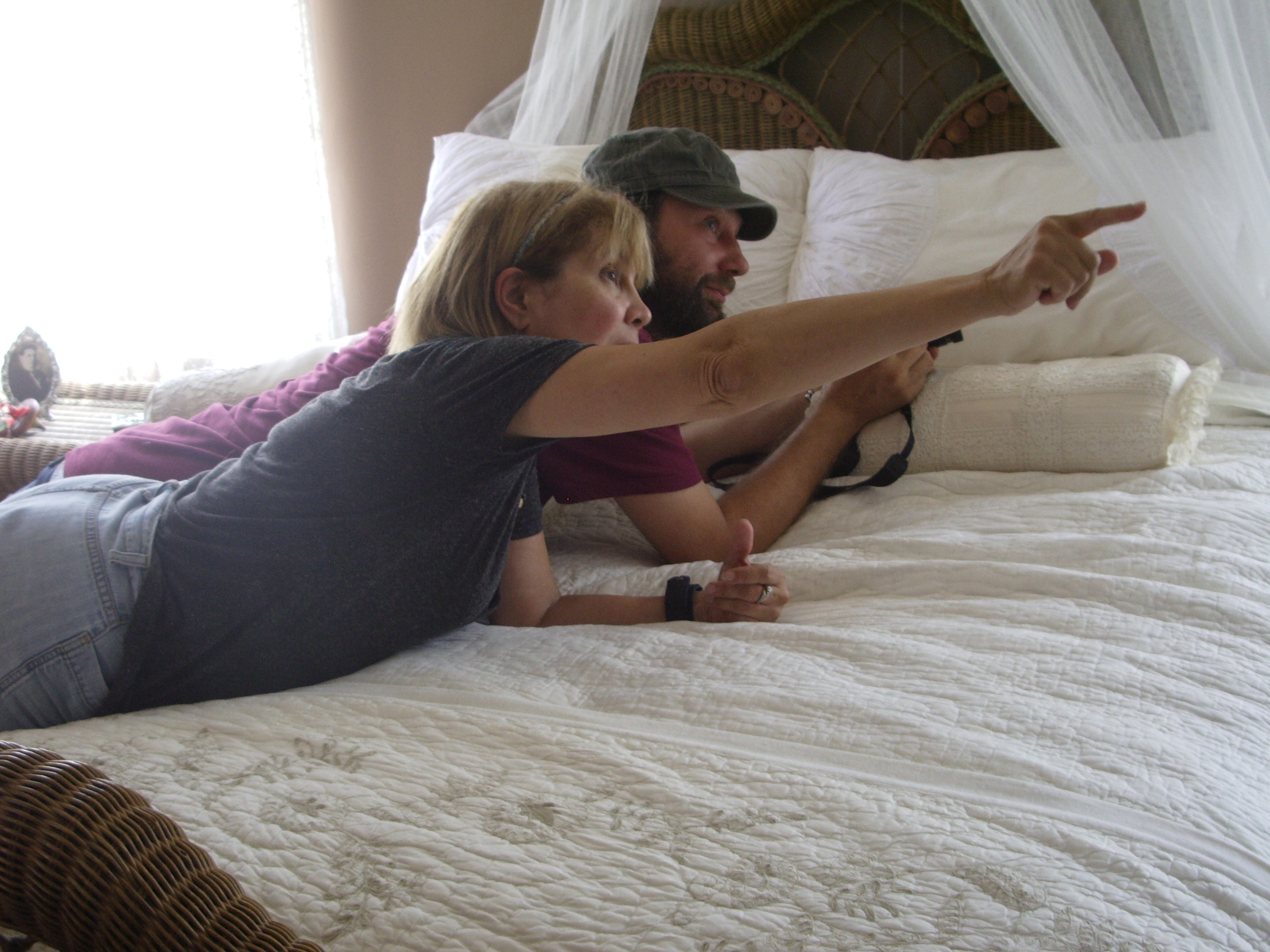
Skarsgård Chinea on set of The Prince of Old Havana

She is in production on The Prince of Old Havana, based on the life of Cuban political icon and pimp Alberto Yarini (1882–1910).

Migdia Chinea is of German-Jewish background through her mom Violeta Mimó Suarez (a variation of Soros and Schwartz).

== Select film and television credits ==
=== Actress ===
- Mannix ("Wine from These Grapes", episode 102) (1971)
- Sanford and Son ("Watts Side Story", episode 32) (1973)
- Splash (1984)

=== Director ===
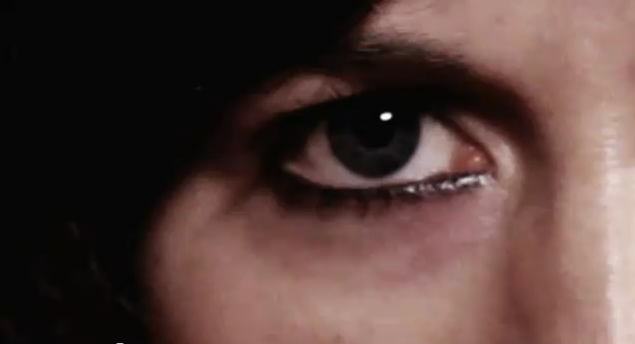
Still from "Anonymous (Street Meat)"

- The Prince of Old Havana (in production, for 2018 release)
- "Old Havana and the Great Pimp of San Isidro" (short film) (2014)
- "Kninth Floor" (short film) (2012)
- "Ard Eevin" (documentary short) (2011)
- "Anonymous (Street Meat)" (short film) (2010)
- Yes, Inc. (TV series) (1998)

=== Writer ===
- What's Happening Now!! (5 episodes, 1985-1986)
- Superboy (4 episodes, 1989-1990)
