= Mark Tuttle =

American producer and screenwriter

- Born: Mark Ward Tuttle; March 17, 1935; Salt Lake City, Utah, U.S.
- Died: June 2, 2008 (aged 73); Los Angeles, California, U.S.
- Occupations: Producer, screenwriter
- Children: 3

Mark Ward Tuttle (March 17, 1935 – June 2, 2008) was an American producer and screenwriter. He produced and wrote for television programs including The Beverly Hillbillies, Petticoat Junction, Three's Company (and its spinoff Three's a Crowd), What's Happening Now!!, 227, Life with Lucy and The Facts of Life.

Tuttle died on June 2, 2008 at his home in Los Angeles, California, at the age of 73.
