= Alberto Yarini =

Cuban racketeer and pimp (1882–1910)

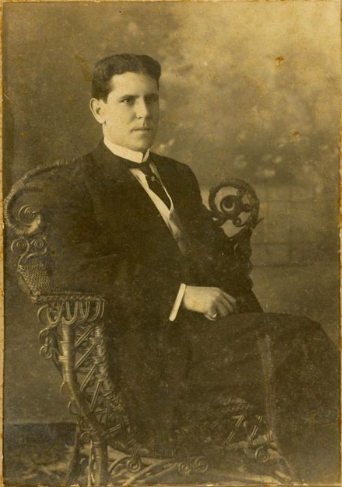
- Born: 5 February 1882; Havana, Cuba
- Died: November 21, 1910 (aged 28); Cuba
- Known for: Racketeering, pimping

Alberto Yarini y Ponce de León (5 February 1882 – 21 November 1910) was a Cuban racketeer and pimp during the period of the Cuban War of Independence against Spain.

Yarini was born into an elite family, once owners of a Matanzas sugar plantations, with his father a dentist, and his uncle a medical surgeon, in Havana. He was educated in the United States, spoke fluent English as well as Spanish, and was politically well connected. He became known for importing prostitutes from France, and worked out of San Isidro, a barrio and red light district in Old Havana. He was killed on November 21, 1910, by gunfire from rival French pimp Louis Lotot and his confederates, who had been waiting for him. Lotot was himself killed in return gunfire from Yarini's bodyguard.

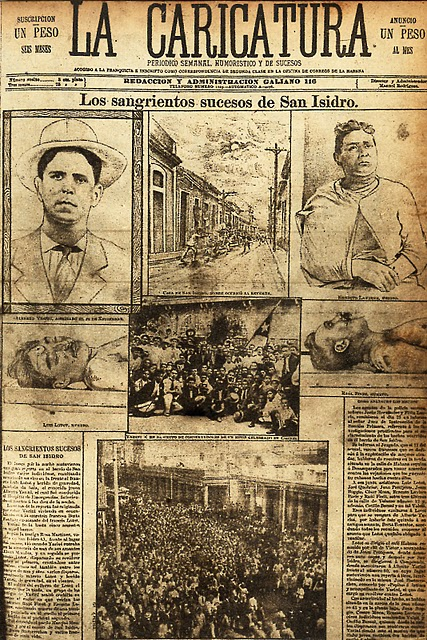
La Caricatura front page on the death of Alberto Yarini

== Legacy ==
Cuban composer Carlos Felipe Hernández wrote the 1960 musical theatre piece Réquiem por Yarini, about Yarini's life. Los Dioses Rotos (Fallen Gods), a 2009 film by Cuban filmmaker Ernesto Daranas, was based in part on Réquiem, and was a submission by Cuba to the 82nd Academy Awards for Best Foreign Language Film.

Yarini is the subject of an upcoming dramatic film, The Prince of Old Havana, by Cuban American writer, actress and director Migdia Chinea-Varela.

In his recent novel Decent people (Personas decentes, Tusquets, 2023), award-winning Cuban writer Leonardo Padura continues his exploration of little-known episodes in 20th-century Cuban history by devoting a leading role to Alberto Yarini within a wider plot involving contemporary history of the island and featuring his detective Mario Conde.
