= Percy & Thunder =

- Genre: Drama
- Written by: Art Washington
- Directed by: Ivan Dixon
- Starring: James Earl Jones; Courtney B. Vance; Billy Dee Williams; Robert Wuhl
- Music by: Tom Scott; Grover Washington Jr.
- Country of origin: United States
- Original language: English

Production
- Executive producer: Michael Brandman
- Producer: Leanne Moore
- Cinematography: Héctor R. Figueroa
- Editor: Diane Adler
- Production companies: Turner Pictures; Amblin Television; Writers Cinema

Original release
- Network: TNT
- Release: September 7, 1993

Percy & Thunder is a 1993 television film directed by Ivan Dixon. It premiered on TNT on September 7, 1993.

== Plot ==
Percy (James Earl Jones) and Thunder (Courtney B. Vance) have been with themselves around the past so they are finding it. Percy and Thunder meets with Leatherhead (Mick E. Jones) a corrupt boss and VFW Refree (Ron Shipp) are having a fight against Percy and Thunder to commit it. Percy takes Thunder and Leatherhead and VFW Refree to let Percy know he has to track down an Assassin and then Percy finds the assassins outside and then fights and kills them and tells Leatherhead assignment is done. Percy and Thunder tells Leatherhead and VFW Refree to see them later. Percy goes to find Promoter (Mike Finneran) to know he is bored and then knows the answers and then can use it anytime. Percy and Promoter take a road trip down the road and then they view what's on the road. Percy and Promoter find the helicopter and then all the targets arrive and then Percy knocks out all the targets and then returns to Promoter. Percy tells Promoter that it's good to spend time with itself to know when it's time for it.

== Cast ==
- James Earl Jones as Percy
- Courtney B. Vance as Thunder
- Billy Dee Williams as Ralph Tate
- Robert Wuhl

== Reception ==
TV Guide said of the film, "Boasting a well-constructed screenplay, the sometimes declamatory PERCY AND THUNDER is gripping despite an occasional cliched interlude."
