= Chippenham Hospital (Richmond, Virginia) =

For-profit hospital in Virginia, US

- HCA Healthcare
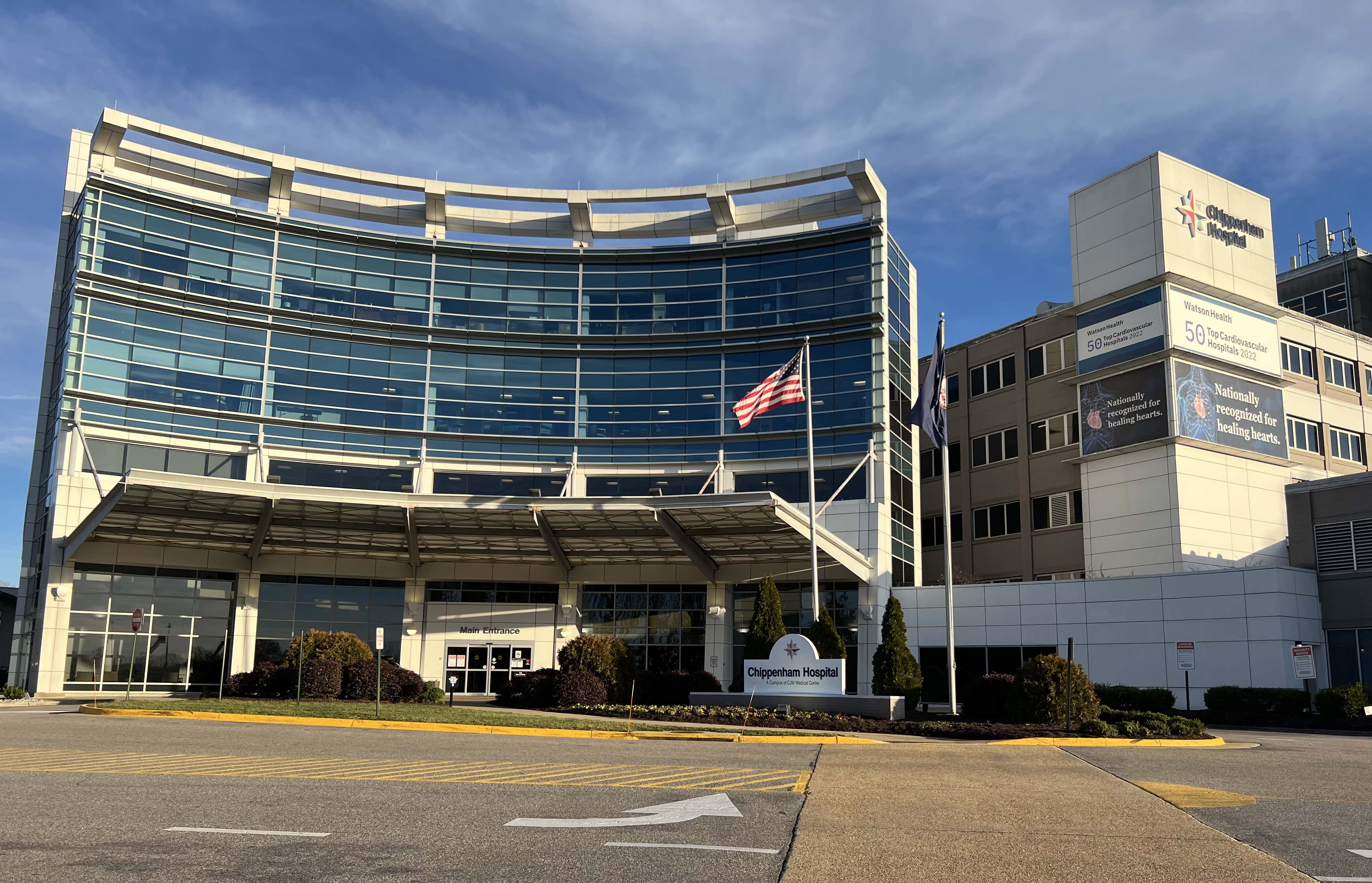

Geography
- Location: Richmond, Virginia, United States
- Coordinates: 37.51496°N 77.52509°W

Services
- Emergency department: Level I trauma center
- Beds: 466

Helipads
- Helipad: FAA LID: 6VA3

History
- Founded: 1972

Links
- Website: www.hcavirginia.com/locations/chippenham-hospital
- Lists: Hospitals in the United States

Chippenham Hospital is a for-profit, 466-bed hospital in Richmond, Virginia, owned and operated by HCA Healthcare.

== History ==
The hospital was originally opened in 1972. In June 2019, the hospital was designated as a provisional Level I trauma center by the Virginia Department of Health, before receiving full Level I certification in 2020. In 2022, the hospital closed its neonatal intensive care unit (NICU), merging NICU services with the nearby Johnston-Willis Hospital.

== Services ==
Chippenham Hospital is a Level I trauma center, a primary stroke center, and a Level I burn center. The hospital also houses the Tucker Pavilion, a 137-bed adult and pediatric inpatient behavioral health facility.
