= What's Happening Now!! =

American sitcom (1985–1988)

- Opening titles from 1985
- Genre: Sitcom
- Created by: Eric Monte
- Written by: Eric Monte; David Silverman; Stephen Sustaric; Michael S. Baser; Kim Weiskopf
- Directed by: Gary Brown; Tony Singletary; Gary Shimokawa; Tony Csiki; Joey Rosenzweig; Robert M. Priest; M. Neema Barnette; Arlando Smith; Phil Olsman; Art Washington; Judy Elterman; Mike Milligan; Ginger Grigg; Pat Fischer-Doak; Gail L. Bergmann
- Starring: Ernest Thomas; Anne-Marie Johnson; Haywood Nelson; Fred Berry; Shirley Hemphill; Martin Lawrence; Ken Sagoes; Danielle Spencer
- Composers: Henry Mancini; Bruce Miller
- Country of origin: United States
- Original language: English
- No. of seasons: 3
- No. of episodes: 66 (list of episodes)

Production
- Executive producers: Michael S. Baser; Mike Milligan; Kim Weiskopf
- Producers: Larry Balmagia; Bob Peete; Michael S. Baser; Kim Weiskopf
- Running time: 22 minutes
- Production companies: LBS Communications; Columbia Pictures Television; Coca-Cola Telecommunications (season 3)

Original release
- Network: First-run syndication
- Release: September 7, 1985 – March 26, 1988

Related
- What's Happening!!

What's Happening Now!! is an American sitcom sequel to the original ABC 1976–1979 sitcom What's Happening!! focusing on its main characters living on their own (after appearing as students in its predecessor series). It aired in first-run broadcast syndication from September 7, 1985, until March 26, 1988.

== Premise ==
Roger "Raj" Thomas (Ernest Thomas) has graduated from the University of Southern California, and become a fledgling writer. He and his new wife Nadine (Anne-Marie Johnson), a social worker, move in to his old home in Watts (given to him by his mother, Mabel Thomas (Mabel King), now remarried and living in Phoenix, Arizona). His sister Dee (Danielle Spencer) is away at college. Childhood friend Dwayne Nelson (Haywood Nelson) has become a computer programmer, while Freddie "Rerun" Stubbs (Fred Berry) is now a used-car salesman. The old soda shop hangout, Rob's Place, has gone out of business and has been left abandoned. Reminded of his youth, and seeing an opportunity, Raj and Shirley Wilson (Shirley Hemphill), who used to wait tables there, decide to buy the business together, renaming it "Rob's."

== Episodes ==
Season	Episodes	Originally released	
Season	Episodes	First released	Last released
1	22	September 7, 1985	March 16, 1986
2	22	September 27, 1986	March 28, 1987
3	22	September 26, 1987	March 26, 1988

== Cast ==
- Ernest Thomas as Roger "Raj" Thomas
- Anne-Marie Johnson as Nadine Hudson-Thomas
- Haywood Nelson as Dwayne Nelson
- Fred Berry as Fred "Rerun" Stubbs (season 1)
- Shirley Hemphill as Shirley Wilson
- Reina King as Carolyn Williams (season 1)
- Martin Lawrence as Maurice Warfield (season 3)
- Ken Sagoes as Darryl (season 3)
- Danielle Spencer as Dee Thomas (recurring)

=== Recurring guests ===
- Meshach Taylor as Buddy Carlton (2 episodes, seasons 1–2)

=== Cast change ===
After the first successful season, as he had done during the original What's Happening series, Fred Berry attempted to negotiate a salary increase based on what he perceived as the popularity of the "Rerun" character. In response, producers fired Berry from the series.

== Home media ==
On June 12, 2007, Sony Pictures Home Entertainment released the first season of What's Happening Now!! on DVD in Region 1.

DVD name	Ep #	Release date
The Complete First Season	22	June 12, 2007
