= Art Washington =

American writer-producer-director

Art Washington is an American television writer-producer-director based in Los Angeles, California. Films and television he has written for include Percy & Thunder, Air America, and MacGyver.

Washington is a proponent and founder of the "Native Black American" distinction/movement. It is his belief that "Native Black American" or simply "Black American" should be used instead of "African American" when referring to Black Americans whose family/direct ancestors have been in America for centuries; dating back to their criminal human abduction and captivity/"slavery" (1581; St. Augustine, Florida).
