= Cubans =

Inhabitants of Cuba and their descendants in the Cuban diaspora

Cubans Cubanos
- Map of the Cuban diaspora around the world

Total population
- Cubans: ~14 million (2024); Diaspora: ~4.3 million

Regions with significant populations
- Cuba 9,434,593 (2025)
- United States: 3,082,802 (2025)
- Spain: 252,290 (2024)
- Brazil: 103,427 (2025)
- Italy: 44,959 (2024)
- Uruguay: 28,976 (2025)
- Mexico: 25,976 (2020) **
- Chile: 21,305 (2023)
- Canada: 19,545 (2021)
- Germany: 16,116 (2020)
- Puerto Rico (United States): 12,627 (2024)
- Venezuela: 10,769 (2020)
- Ecuador: 10,768 (2022)
- Costa Rica: 6,908 (2020)
- Guyana: 5,000+ (2025)
- Colombia: 4,383 (2018)
- Switzerland: 3,574 (2020)
- Dominican Republic: 3,402 (2020)
- Peru: 3,170 (2020)
- Sweden: 3,093 (2024)
- Belgium: 2,445 (2024)
- United Kingdom: 2,333 (2020)
- Russia: 2,224 (2020)
- Panama: 2,194 (2020)
- Netherlands: 1,992 (2024)
- Bolivia: 1,971 (2020)
- Portugal: 1,858 (2020)
- South Africa: 1,846 (2020)
- Jamaica: 1,825 (2020)
- Guinea: 1,714 (2020)
- Norway: 1,264 (2024)
- Austria: 1,249 (2024)
- Haiti: 1,185 (2020)
- Argentina: 1,116 (2020)
- Australia: 1,050 (2024)

Languages
- Cuban Spanish, Lucumí, English (Miami accent), Spanglish, Cubonics

Religion
- Majority: Roman Catholicism; Minority: Irreligion, Protestantism, Santería, Espiritismo, Ifá, Palo, Judaism

Related ethnic groups
- Puerto Ricans · Floridanos · Spaniards · Africans · Taíno · Canarians · Catalans · Galicians · Andalusians · Portuguese · French · Latinos

Cubans (Spanish: cubanos) are the citizens and nationals of the Republic of Cuba, as well as members of the Cuban diaspora who identify culturally or ethnically as Cuban, irrespective of their current citizenship.

Cuba's resident population stood at approximately 9.7 million at the end of 2024, according to preliminary figures released by the Oficina Nacional de Estadística e Información (ONEI). According to the ONEI, the country's population has been undergoing a sustained decline driven by the combined effect of significant emigration and a negative rate of natural increase. Independent demographic analyses suggest that the actual resident population may be lower than official figures indicate, owing in part to an underestimation of emigration to destinations other than the United States.

Outside the island, the United States hosts by far the largest Cuban community, estimated at 2.9 million people of Cuban origin in 2024, concentrated primarily in Florida—notably in the Miami metropolitan area—as well as in Texas, California, New Jersey, and New York City. Spain constitutes the second-largest Cuban diaspora community, with smaller populations present in Brazil, Italy, and Uruguay.

The population of Cuba descends primarily from three groups: Spanish settlers and immigrants – drawn largely from Andalusia, Galicia, Asturias, and the Canary Islands — sub-Saharan Africans transported to the island through the transatlantic slave trade, and the pre-Columbian indigenous peoples, chiefly the Taíno and Ciboney. A significant, though demographically contested, share of Cubans carries mixed ancestry from all three groups, not as a product of recent admixture but of centuries of intermarriage accumulated across many generations. While Afro-Cubans and Cubans of Spanish descent have endured as distinct ethnocultural units, no equivalent indigenous-descended group survived the catastrophic demographic collapse of the sixteenth century; Taíno ancestry nonetheless persists in the Cuban population at the genetic level, as evidenced by mitochondrial DNA studies. Cuban Spanish, a variety of Spanish, is the native language of virtually all Cubans on the island and remains widely spoken among a large proportion of the diaspora.

== History ==
The population of Cuba prior to European contact consisted primarily of the Taíno and Ciboney peoples, with smaller groups of Guanahatabey inhabiting the island's westernmost regions. Spanish colonization, initiated following Christopher Columbus's arrival in 1492, resulted in the catastrophic decline of the indigenous population through epidemic disease, forced labor, and violence.

To sustain the plantation economy that emerged in the eighteenth century—centered above all on sugar cultivation—the Spanish colonial administration oversaw the large-scale forced importation of enslaved Africans. By the mid-nineteenth century, Cuba had become one of the largest slave societies in the Western Hemisphere, with Africans and their descendants constituting a substantial portion of the island's population, drawn from numerous West and Central African societies, including Yoruba-, Fon-, and Kongo-speaking peoples.

Spanish settlers—both Iberian-born peninsulares and American-born criollos—completed the colonial demographic triad. The prolonged and coerced cohabitation among these groups, along with the cultural exchange it engendered, gave rise to a syncretic society whose religious practices, music, and social customs reflected multiple origins. The Cuban ethnologist Fernando Ortiz described this process as transculturation—a term he coined to denote the mutual transformation of cultures in sustained contact—and identified it as a defining characteristic of Cuban civilization.

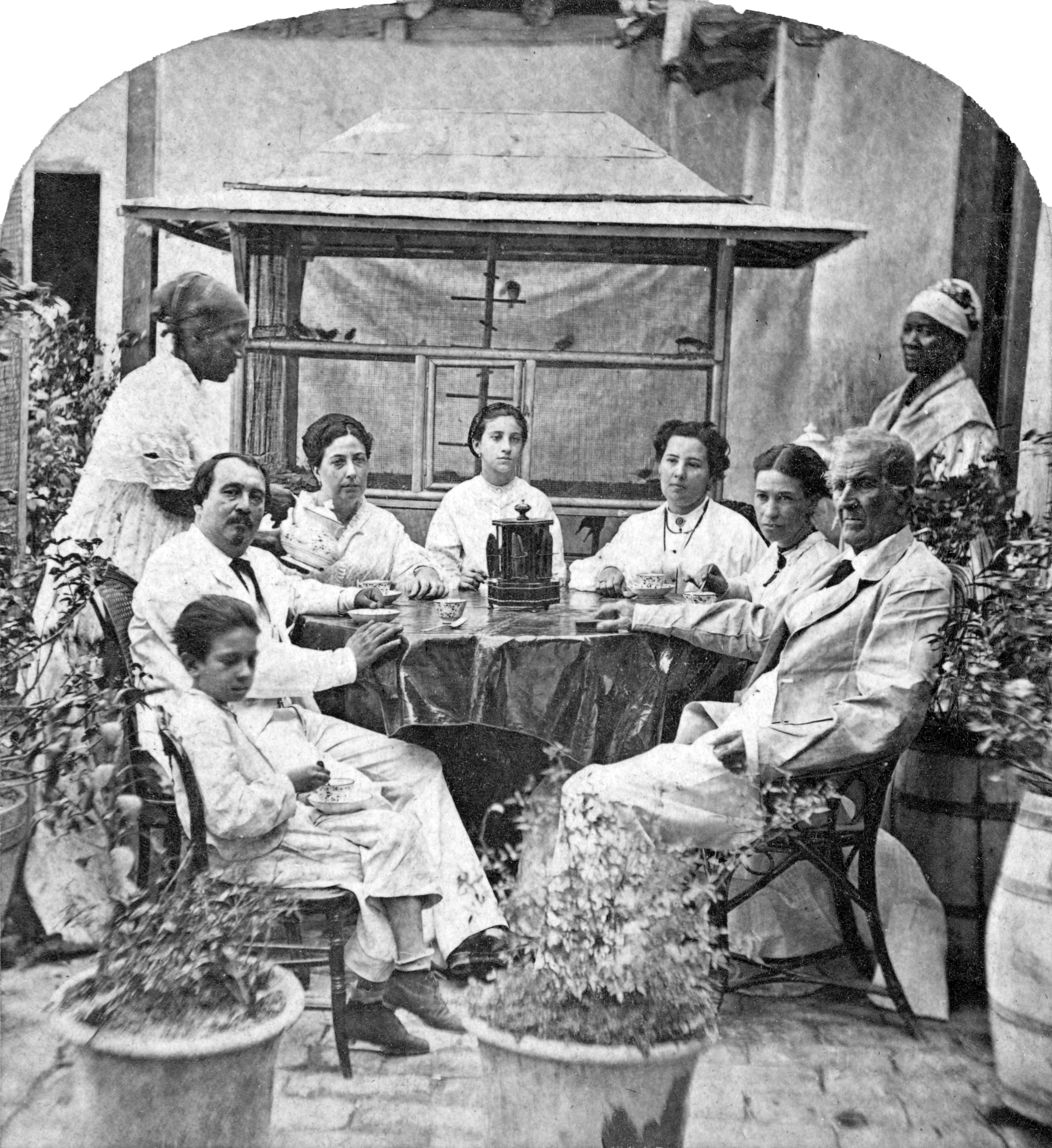
A Cuban family at the evening meal, circa 1875.

By the late eighteenth and early nineteenth centuries, a distinct creole consciousness—often articulated under the rubric of Cubanidad—had begun to emerge among the island's non-peninsular population. This developing identity was shaped by the plantation economy, by the growth of Havana as a cosmopolitan urban center, and by the proliferation of cultural forms that drew simultaneously on African, Spanish, and residual indigenous influences, including the danzón, the décima, the syncretic religious practices associated with Regla de Ocha, and the mutual-aid and ritual societies of the Abakuá. The emergence of a distinctly Cuban cultural identity developed alongside the political tensions of colonial society, including resentment of Spanish trade restrictions, the contradictions of a slaveholding creole elite seeking greater autonomy, and the gradual emergence of abolitionist sentiment.

The articulation of Cuban national identity as an explicit political project reached a decisive stage during the independence struggles of the second half of the nineteenth century. The Ten Years' War (1868–1878), initiated in part by creole planters such as Carlos Manuel de Céspedes—who freed his own slaves at the outset of the insurgency—placed questions of race and inclusion at the center of the emerging nationalist movement. The figure of José Martí, the leading ideologue of Cuban independence, gave the movement its most influential theoretical expression. In essays including Nuestra América (1891) and Mi raza (1893), Martí argued that racial divisions were incompatible with the construction of a free republic and that Cuban identity itself constituted the basis of national unity. The Cuban War of Independence (1895–1898) gave material form to this vision: the mambí insurgent armies were notably multiracial in composition, and Afro-Cuban officers—most prominently Antonio Maceo, known as the "Bronze Titan"—achieved prominence at the highest levels of command. The war's conclusion, however, brought not sovereignty but American military intervention and a prolonged period of U.S. occupation and political oversight, which significantly shaped the subsequent development of Cuban national identity.

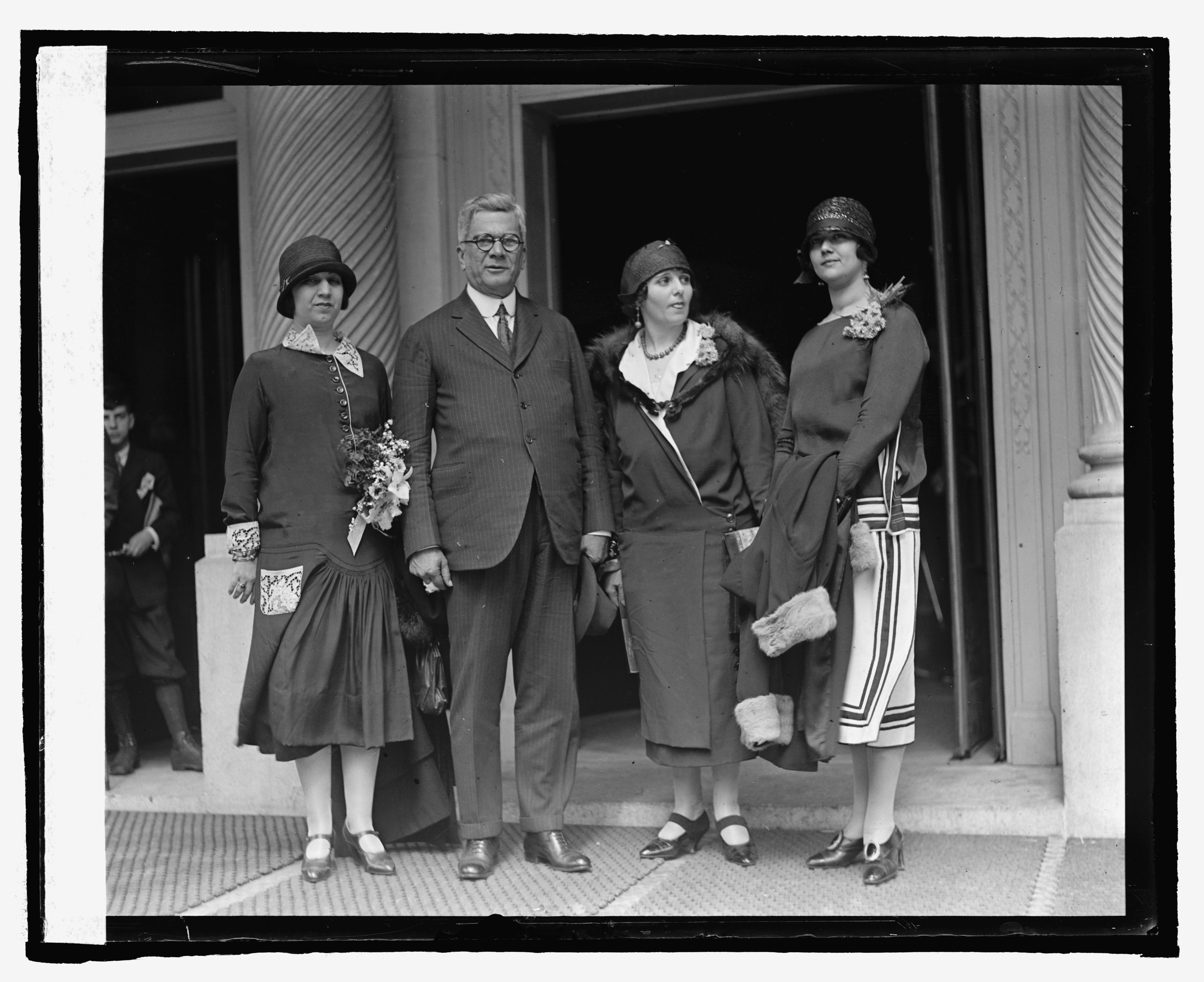
Gerardo Machado, president-elect of Cuba, photographed with his daughter and two companions on April 15, 1925. Machado was inaugurated on May 20, 1925, and governed Cuba until his forced resignation and exile in August 1933 amid the Revolution of 1933.

The Cuban Republic established in 1902 inherited both the egalitarian ideals of the independence movement and the racial inequalities of the colonial period. The official republican ideology was grounded in Martí's concept of raceless nationalism, yet historians have argued that this universalist framework often discouraged autonomous Afro-Cuban political mobilization by portraying race-based advocacy as contrary to national unity. The Partido Independiente de Color, founded in 1908 to advocate for Afro-Cuban political representation, was outlawed under the Morúa Amendment of 1910; its armed protest in 1912 was met with military suppression in which thousands of Afro-Cubans were killed. Nonetheless, the Afrocubanismo cultural movement of the 1920s and 1930s—associated with figures including the poet Nicolás Guillén, the novelist Alejo Carpentier, and Ortiz himself—reasserted the African dimension of Cuban culture as fundamental to national identity. At the same time, the pervasive economic, political, and cultural influence of the United States contributed to the development of a reactive nationalism through which many Cubans increasingly defined their collective identity in opposition to American dominance.

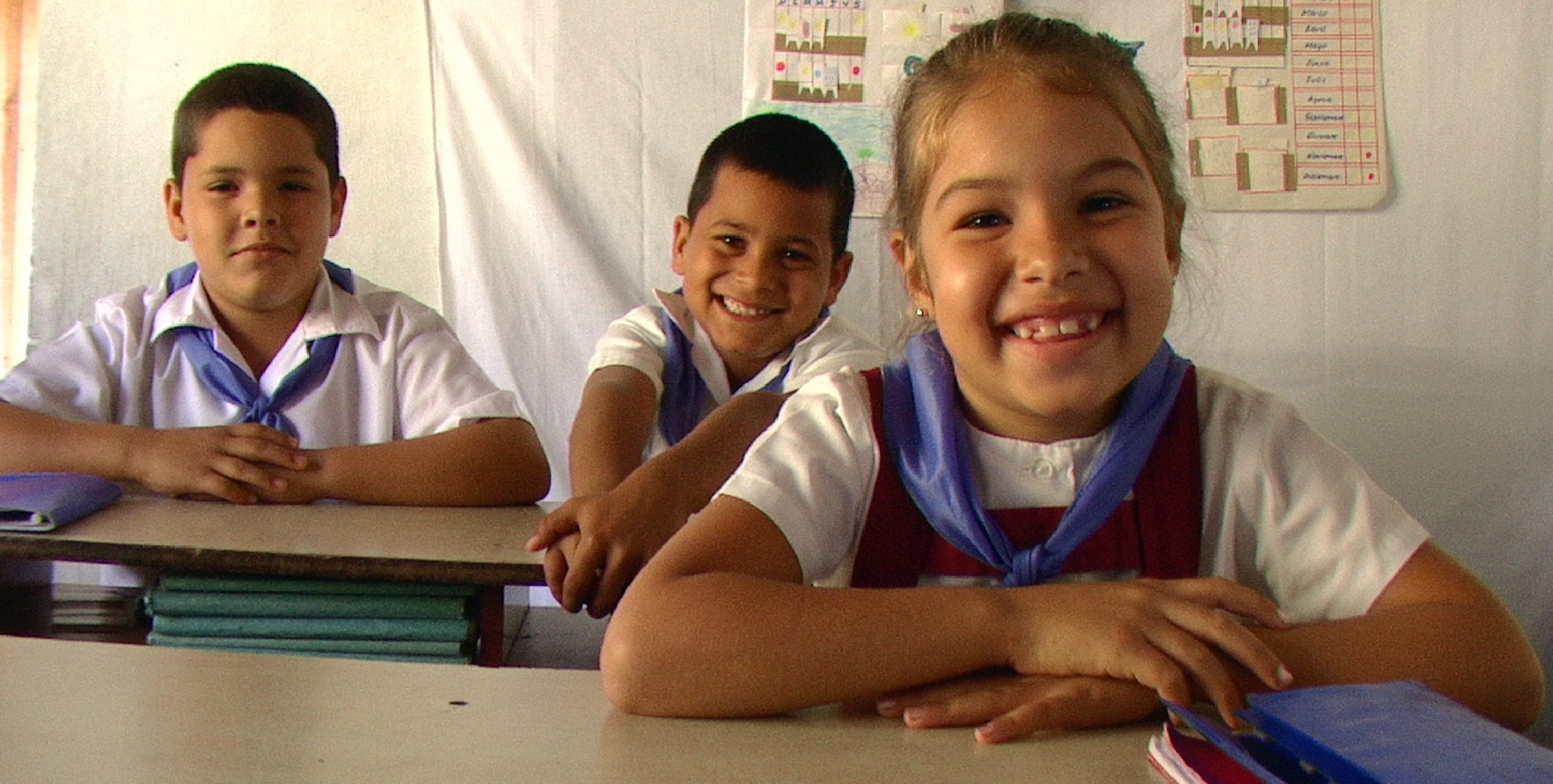
A public primary school classroom in Cuba. The Cuban state provides free, universal education from primary through university level, a system expanded after the Cuban Revolution and notable for achieving near-total literacy through the nationwide 1961 literacy campaign.

The Cuban Revolution of 1959, led by Fidel Castro and the 26th of July Movement, represented both a political rupture and an attempt to reconstruct Cuban national identity on new ideological foundations. The revolutionary government declared the elimination of racial discrimination an immediate social objective and moved to dismantle many of the institutional structures it identified as mechanisms through which inequality had been reproduced. National identity was increasingly reframed in terms of revolutionary commitment and socialist internationalism. The ideal of the hombre nuevo (new man), theorized by Che Guevara in his 1965 essay El socialismo y el hombre en Cuba, emphasized collective sacrifice, socialist construction, and anti-imperialism. This anti-imperialist identity was projected internationally through Cuba's military and civilian interventions in Africa and Latin America, most notably in Angola, where Cuban forces supported the MPLA government against UNITA and South African forces between 1975 and 1991, and in Ethiopia, where Cuba intervened on behalf of the Derg during the Ogaden War of 1977–1978. These interventions were presented by the Cuban government as expressions of Third-Worldist solidarity and as continuations of anti-colonial struggle, drawing explicitly on Cuba's historical experiences of colonialism and slavery and on Martí's anti-imperialist legacy. The revolution's emphasis on a unitary, state-centered national identity simultaneously marginalized political dissent and contributed to the formation of a substantial emigrant diaspora, particularly in the United States, whose members developed competing interpretations of Cuban identity rooted in exile and opposition to the revolutionary state.

== Demographics of Cuba ==
=== Census data ===
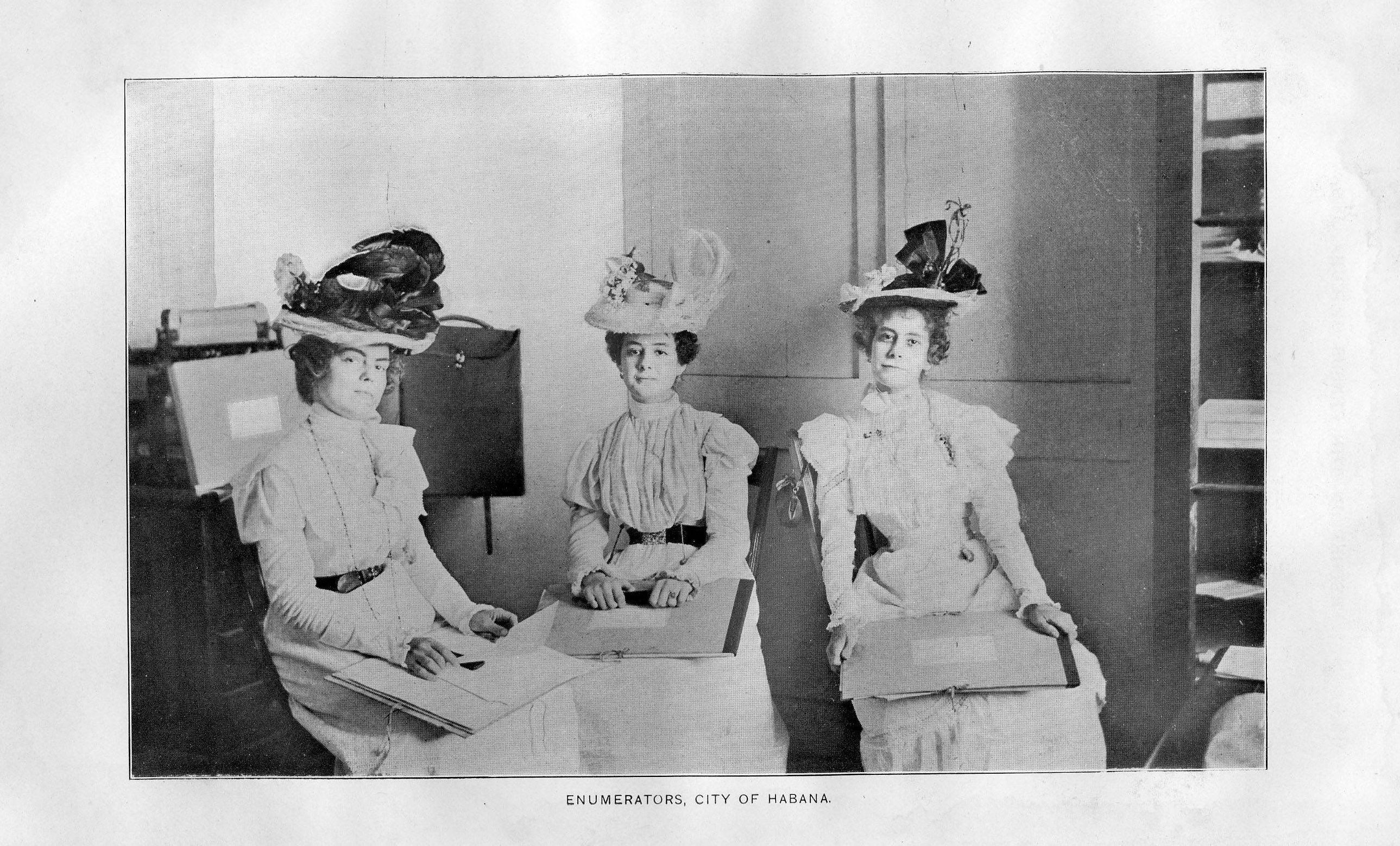
Census enumerators in the city of Havana, 1899.

The Cuban Census of 2012, conducted between 15 and 24 September of that year by the National Office of Statistics and Information (Oficina Nacional de Estadísticas e Información, ONEI), remains, as of 2026, the most recent completed national population census on the island. Cuba follows a decennial census cycle; a new Population and Housing Census had originally been scheduled for September 2022, but has been postponed on multiple occasions – first to 2025, then to 2026 – owing to the country's severe economic crisis and the logistical constraints it has produced. ONEI conducted a census rehearsal in the municipality of Santa Cruz del Norte, Mayabeque, in November 2025 in preparation for the 2026 census; the full results had not been published as of mid-year. The demographic data presented in this section accordingly reflect conditions recorded in September 2012; subsequent changes are summarised in the subsection below.

According to the 2012 census, Cuba's resident population stood at 11,167,325 inhabitants, of whom 5,570,825 were male and 5,596,500 female, yielding a sex ratio of 995 males per 1,000 females. This figure represented a slight decline from the 11,177,743 inhabitants recorded in the 2002 census — the first intercensal population decrease since the independence wars — attributable to a total fertility rate below replacement level and a negative migration balance. The most populous municipalities at the time of the census were Havana (2,106,146 inhabitants), Santiago de Cuba (506,037), Holguín (346,195), Camagüey (323,309), and Santa Clara (240,543).

=== Demographic changes since 2012 ===
Cuba's population has undergone accelerating decline since the 2012 census, driven by three mutually reinforcing simultaneous processes: a total fertility rate that has remained persistently below replacement level, a negative natural increase — with deaths consistently exceeding births – and mass emigration of historically unprecedented scale.

Cuban population residing in Cuba View source data.

=== Fertility rate and natural population change ===
Cuba has not reached replacement-level fertility since 1977 – though some official Cuban sources, such as the country's 2017 report to the UN Commission on Population and Development and the Statistical Health Yearbook 2022, place the definitive fall below the threshold of 2.1 children per woman in 1978 —, placing it among the earliest and most prolonged cases of sub-replacement fertility among developing economies.

The total fertility rate (TFR) fluctuated between 1.41 and 1.54 children per woman during the 2021–2023 triennium and fell to 1.29 in 2024 – the lowest value ever recorded in the country's history —, well below the replacement threshold of 2.1. In 2024, registered live births totalled 71,358 – the lowest annual figure in 65 years —, with a crude birth rate of 7.2 per 1,000 inhabitants, while registered deaths reached 128,098, producing a natural decrease of 56,740 persons and a deaths-to-births ratio of approximately 1.8:1. Deaths have continuously exceeded births since 2020.

The combination of very low fertility with relatively high life expectancy reflects the social policies implemented following the Cuban Revolution of 1959 — universal healthcare, broad access to contraceptive methods and to abortion (institutionalised in 1965, making Cuba the first country in Latin America and the Caribbean to do so) —, as well as high rates of female school enrolment and women's participation in the labour market, which together produced a demographic transition characteristic of high-income societies without the corresponding level of economic development.

=== Median age ===
Cuba's median age stood at 39.5 years at the time of the 2012 census, and had increased to approximately 42.5 years in the 2025–2026 period according to the 2024 revision of the World Population Prospects by the United Nations Population Division. This figure contrasts markedly with the regional median age for Latin America and the Caribbean, which stood at approximately 31 years in 2024 according to the ECLAC.

Excluding Puerto Rico by virtue of its status as an unincorporated territory — whose median age, at approximately 46.7 years, exceeds that of the island – Cuba is the sovereign country with the highest median age in the Americas, ahead of Canada (~40.6 years) and the United States (~39.1 years). This places Cuba in a demographic profile comparable to that of France (~42–43 years) and other Western European nations with advanced economies. In 2024, approximately 25.7% of Cuba's resident population was aged 60 or over, the highest proportion in Latin America and the Caribbean.

This demographic profile – the product of historically low fertility rates, relatively high life expectancy, and the disproportionate emigration of young adults — is typically associated with high-income economies. Cuba's advanced median age, coexisting with a comparatively low per capita income, constitutes a structurally anomalous demographic condition: among countries whose median age exceeds forty years, Cuba ranks among those with the lowest incomes, though figures for Cuban GDP are not reported by the International Monetary Fund and available estimates vary considerably depending on the methodology employed.

=== Sex distribution ===
According to the 2012 census, the sex distribution of the Cuban population was nearly balanced, with 5,570,825 males and 5,596,500 females, corresponding to a sex ratio of 995 males per 1,000 females. At the close of 2024, ONEI recorded a ratio of 974 males per 1,000 females (4,808,909 males and 4,939,098 females), evidencing a measurable shift in the sex balance relative to the 2012 census.

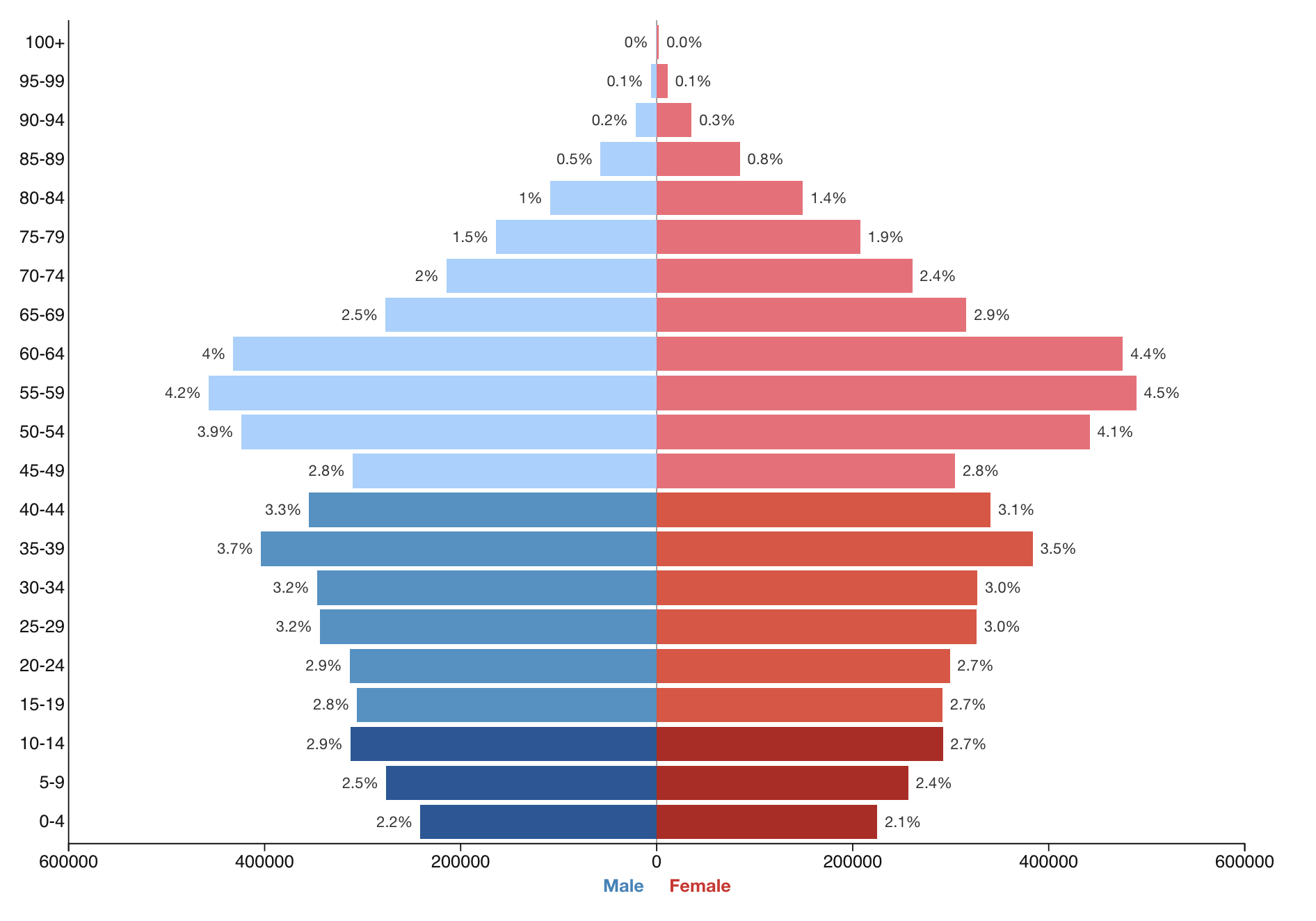
Population pyramid of Cuba, 2026.

The migratory wave that began in 2021 has been characterised by a high proportion of women, accentuating a trend towards the feminisation of migration that, according to the academic literature, has been consolidating within Cuban emigration since the 1990s and reached unprecedented magnitude during the period 2021–2024. Approximately 56–57% of Cuban emigrants in the recent period were women – 56.6% according to the accumulated historical stock per UN data, and approximately 57% according to estimates of outgoing flows for 2022–2023 – as reported in the United Nations International Migrant Stock and in analyses by economist and demographer Juan Carlos Albizu-Campos published through the Cuba Capacity Building Project at Columbia Law School. With regard to age structure, approximately 77% of the emigrant contingent was of working age, with estimates ranging between the 15–59 age bracket – used in Albizu-Campos's calculations, in line with the Cuban definition of the economically active population — and the 15–49 bracket, the standard demographic range for reproductive age, employed by other sources. ONEI confirmed that by the close of 2023 the contingent of women of childbearing age (15–49 years) had decreased by 304,717 persons relative to the preceding reference calculation, with more than 70% of that loss concentrated in the 15–39 age group.

This dynamic has altered not only the size of the population but also the relative balance between the sexes – reflected in the decline of the masculinity ratio from 995 to 974 between 2012 and 2024 – and the age composition of the population of reproductive age, with direct consequences for the total fertility rate and the structure of the labour market. The precise impact on the age and sex distribution cannot, however, be determined with census-level accuracy in the absence of an updated enumeration.

== Ethnography of Cuba ==
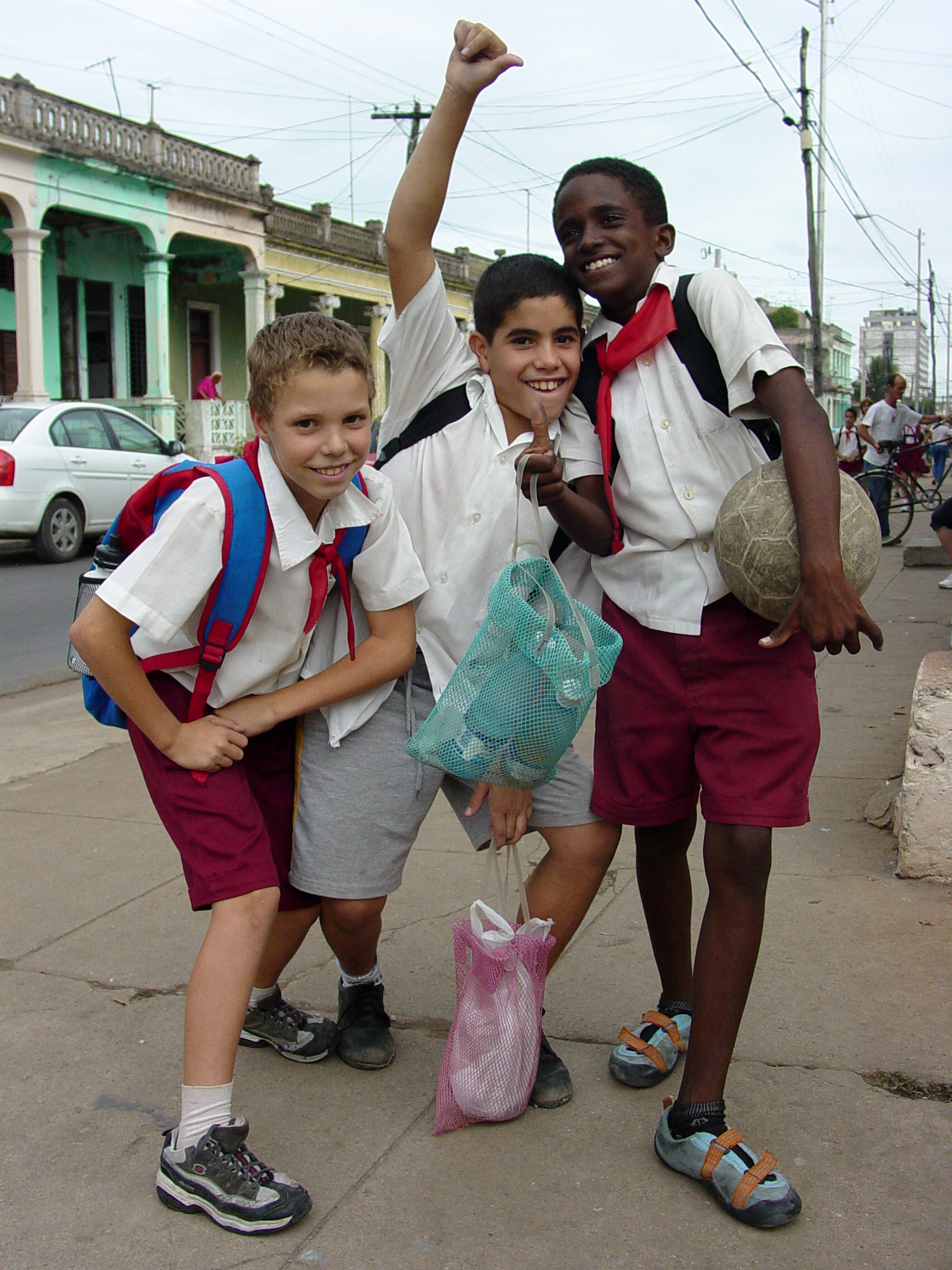
Children in primary school uniforms in Pinar del Río.

The ethnic and racial composition of Cuba is the product of a prolonged historical process of racial mixing, forced displacement, and voluntary migration.

The population classified as white descends primarily from Peninsular settlers and immigrants, with a particularly notable presence of individuals from Andalusia, the Canary Islands, Asturias, and Galicia — regions whose imprint is still evident in the island's culture, speech, and toponymy.

The black population derives primarily from the Sub-Saharan Africans introduced as enslaved people during the Atlantic slave trade, which reached its greatest intensity between the late eighteenth century and the mid-nineteenth century, and in which individuals from the Yoruba, Fon, and Bantu peoples predominated, among other groups from West and Central Africa.

The indigenous peoples, principally of Taíno origin, largely disappeared during the first decades of colonisation as a result of violence, disease, and forced labour. Although no communities of unmixed Amerindian descent are recorded today, genetic studies point to the persistence of traces of that ancestral heritage in segments of the present population.

To these principal streams are added, on a smaller scale, the descendants of Chinese workers who arrived under contract during the nineteenth century and those of immigrants from the Arab Levant, whose presence on the island consolidated between the late nineteenth century and the first half of the twentieth. A considerable proportion of Cubans carry mixed lineages combining, in varying proportions and across multiple generations, Spanish, African, and indigenous heritage.

Cuban census data and ethnic demographics
Year	White / %		Mulatto/ Mestizo / %		Black / %		East Asian (Amarillo) / %		Total
1774	96,440	56.2	75,180 / 43.8						▲171,620
1861	793,484	56.8	603,046 / 43.2						▲1,396,530
1899	1,052,397	67.9	270,805	TBD	234,738	TBD	14,857	TBD	▲1,572,797
1943	3,553,312	74.3	743,113	15.6	463,227	9.7	18,931	0.4	▲4,778,583
2002	7,271,926	65.0	2,658,675	24.86	1,126,894	10.08	112,268	1.02	▲11,177,743
2012	7,160,399	64.1	2,972,882	26.6	1,034,044	9.3	–	–	▼11,167,325

Source.

=== Pre-Columbian peoples ===
Cuba does not include an indigenous self-identification category in its official population surveys (Oficina Nacional de Estadística e Información, ONEI), meaning that Amerindian ancestry can only be quantified through genetic studies. At the arrival of Christopher Columbus in 1492, Cuba was inhabited by at least three distinct indigenous groups.

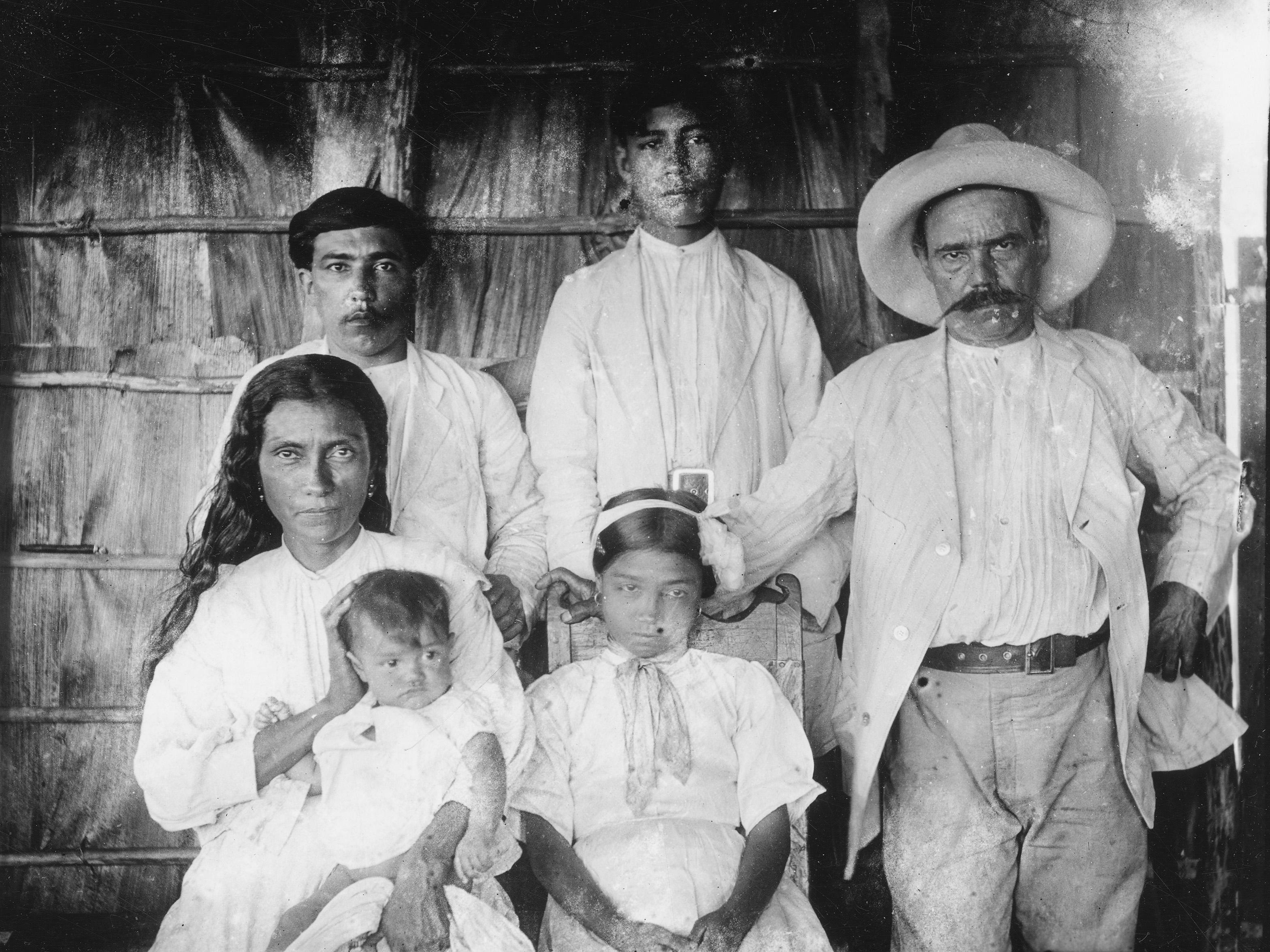
The Barrientos family, headed by an indigenous-descended woman from Baracoa, Cuba, and a Spanish ex-soldier, 1919.

==== Guanahatabey ====
The Guanahatabey were the earliest documented inhabitants, archaic hunter-gatherers settled in the western tip of the island from approximately 4000 BC, whose language shows no demonstrable relationship to Taíno or any other documented language of the Arawakan family.

==== Ciboney ====
The Ciboney (or Siboney), a Western Arawakan group, inhabited the central and western parts of the island. Although various sources describe them as the most geographically widespread group at the time of contact, their status as the most numerous is a matter of academic debate, given that the Taíno maintained higher-density settlements in the east.

==== Taíno ====
The Taíno, an Arawakan people originating from the South American lowlands and possessing a more advanced level of technological development than the preceding groups, occupied primarily the eastern and central parts of Cuba and were the first group contacted by Columbus when he landed on the island's eastern shores on 28 October 1492. Estimates of the pre-contact indigenous population range from approximately 60,000 to 600,000, with the most recent academic estimates clustering toward the lower end of that range. The Taíno were organised in villages under hereditary leaders called caciques, practised the cultivation of maize and cassava, and developed a material culture whose imprint persists in contemporary Cuba: words such as tabaco, hamaca, and canoa, as well as numerous toponyms — among them Havana, Camagüey, and Baracoa — derive from the Taíno language.

==== Spanish conquest and demographic collapse ====
The Spanish conquest of Cuba, initiated under Diego Velázquez de Cuéllar from 1511 onwards, brought about the near-total destruction of the indigenous population within a few decades. The encomienda system – regulated by the Laws of Burgos of 1512 and their supplementary ordinances of 1513 – subjected Taíno and Ciboney communities to forced labour, principally in gold mining and agricultural production, under conditions that contemporaries such as Bartolomé de las Casas characterised as lethal. Las Casas documented the Massacre of Caonao (c. 1513), claiming in his account that several thousand indigenous people perished; this figure has been questioned by subsequent historiography, which notes the chronicler's tendency toward hyperbole in his numerical estimates. To the violence of conquest were added successive epidemics – including one that struck Hispaniola in 1493 prior to the permanent colonisation of Cuba, smallpox (1518–1519), and measles — which caused catastrophic mortality among populations with no prior herd immunity. Survivors fled to mountain refuges or were confined to indigenous towns, one of which, Guanabacoa, is today a municipality of Havana. By the mid-sixteenth century, official Spanish records indicated that barely any identifiable indigenous communities survived, and the prevailing academic consensus for much of the twentieth century held that Cuba's Taíno had disappeared as a distinct population within one or two generations of contact.

==== Revision of the total extinction narrative ====
This thesis has been substantially revised by ethnographic and genetic research conducted since the 1980s. Nineteenth-century observers – among them the British abolitionist David Turnbull during his stay in Havana in 1838–1840 and the Spanish naturalist Miguel Rodríguez Ferrer, whose principal work on Cuba was published in 1876 on the basis of fieldwork conducted between 1840 and 1861 — described communities in Guanabacoa, El Caney, and the foothills of the Sierra Maestra displaying signs of indigenous ancestry, though such testimonies reflect the racial categories of their era and do not constitute genealogical or genetic verification. The most rigorous work was initiated in 1989 by José Barreiro, a Cuban-born scholar and then associate director of research at the National Museum of the American Indian of the Smithsonian Institution, in collaboration with the historian of Baracoa Alejandro Hartmann Matos. Their ethnographic research estimated that at least 5,000 individuals with identifiable indigenous ancestry survived in Cuba, while hundreds of thousands might carry partial indigenous ancestry. The community of La Caridad de los Indios, in the mountains southwest of Baracoa, is the most frequently cited in academic literature as the one that best preserves Taíno cultural continuity – including traditional agricultural practices, construction techniques, and oral tradition – within a predominantly mixed-race population. In 2018, the Smithsonian Institution returned to this community bone fragments of seven Taíno individuals removed nearly a century earlier by American archaeologist Mark R. Harrington. It is essential to note that the evidence of indigenous survival in Cuba pertains almost exclusively to cultural practices and partial genetic ancestry, not to biologically "pure" populations by any genealogical criterion. All communities identified as Taíno descendants are predominantly mixed-race, with Spanish and African ancestry. Indigenous identity was moreover historically suppressed: Spanish colonial authorities actively persecuted it for the purpose of extinguishing indigenous land rights – the last land claim was rejected by courts in 1850 – and its stigmatisation led many families to conceal their ancestry for generations.

==== Genetic evidence of Amerindian ancestry ====
Several genomic studies confirm the persistence of significant indigenous ancestry in the Cuban population, with a markedly asymmetric distribution with respect to sex and geography. The largest-scale autosomal study, conducted by Marcheco-Teruel et al. (2014) and published in PLOS Genetics with a sample of 1,019 individuals from all Cuban provinces, estimated mean island-wide autosomal Amerindian ancestry at approximately 8% (compared to 72% European and 20% African), while the estimate based on mitochondrial DNA (mtDNA) rose to 34.5%. This marked asymmetry – indigenous ancestry traceable almost exclusively through the maternal line – is consistent with colonial-era dynamics, in which unions occurred between indigenous women and European and African men, while male indigenous lineages were effectively eliminated by the conquest and epidemics. The same study recorded a pronounced geographical variation: the eastern provinces of Granma (15%), Holguín (12%), and Las Tunas (12%) showed the highest rates of autosomal Amerindian ancestry, which coincides with the historical distribution of Taíno settlement. Comparative studies of mtDNA in the Caribbean document high frequencies of Amerindian lineages in former Spanish colonies, while they are practically absent in territories of French and British colonisation, reflecting the differing colonial policies of each power and their different reliance on enslaved African labour. An analysis of ancient DNA from Ciboney individuals from Cuban archaeological sites confirmed the affinity of their mitochondrial lineages with Arawakan populations from South America.

==== Indigenous Florida refugees ====
The Amerindian demographic legacy of Cuba received a secondary contribution from indigenous refugees from northern Florida, displaced following the transfer of Spanish Florida to Britain under the Treaty of Paris of 1763. During the colonial period, groups such as the Timucua, Calusa, Tequesta, and Apalachee had maintained close ties with Cuba, particularly with Havana; the Calusa conducted regular canoe-borne trade with the city from around 1600. These populations had already been drastically reduced by epidemics and raids by British-allied groups before 1763: by the 1720s, the once-numerous Timucua had been reduced to fewer than 40 individuals. In 1763, a small number of indigenous refugees joined the Spanish exodus from St. Augustine, while a remnant population of Calusa descent – whose precise size is difficult to establish from available colonial sources, given the advanced state of tribal disintegration of that people by that date – was transported to Havana. These communities, already broadly integrated into Spanish colonial society, were rapidly absorbed into the general Cuban population, and their specific genetic contribution cannot be quantified independently of the considerably more dominant Taíno component.

=== Cubans of predominantly European ancestry ("Whites") ===
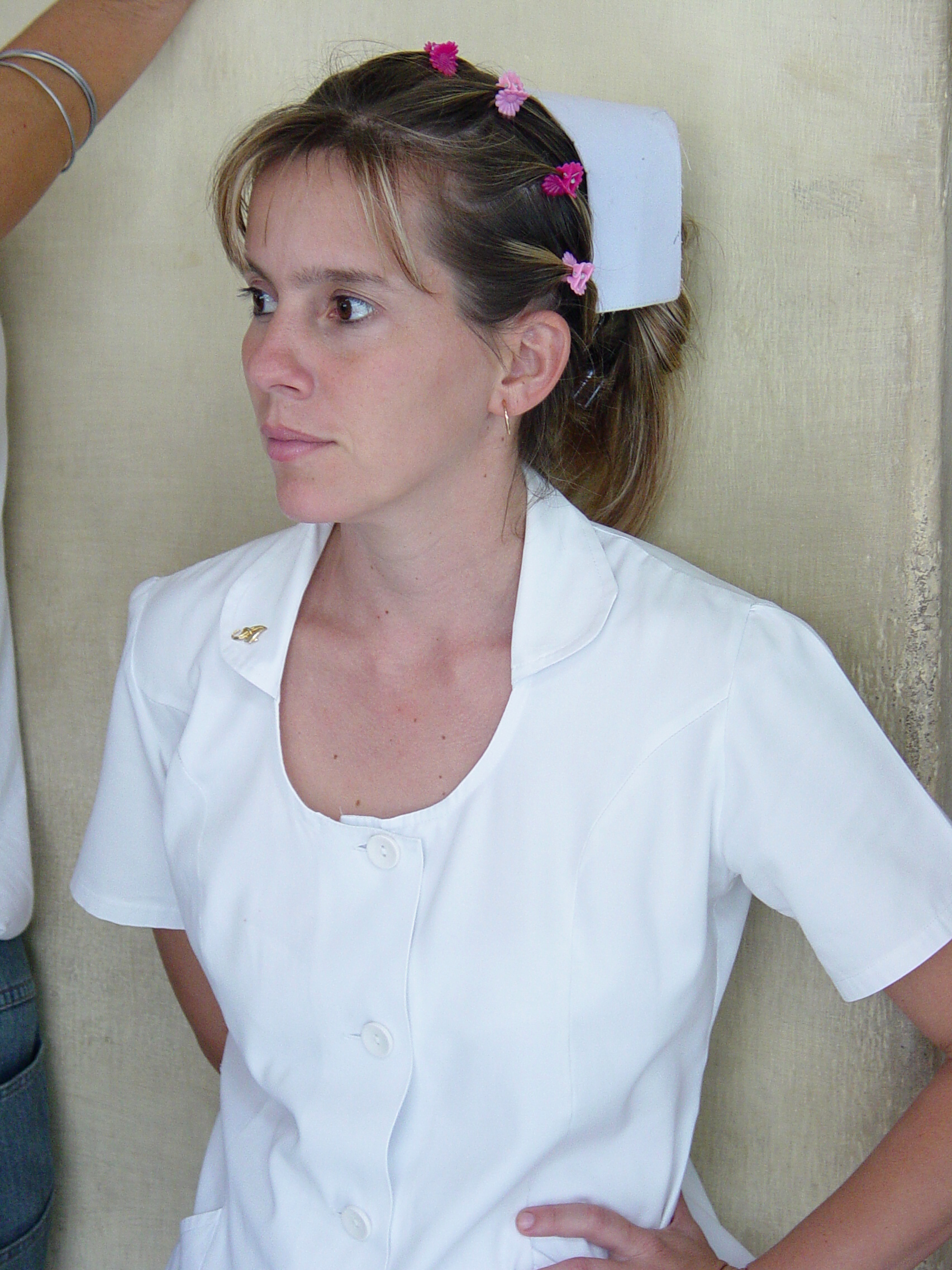
A Cuban nurse in Pinar del Río Province, 2009.

In the national census of 2012, 64.1% of the population of Cuba identified as white. In Cuban demographic and ethnoracial classification, the term blanco (white) designates persons of predominantly European ancestry and is not equivalent to the Anglophone category white, which carries distinct connotations – notably an association with Northern European ancestry – absent from Cuban usage. Owing to the island's colonial history and patterns of immigration, the white Cuban population is overwhelmingly descended from Southern Europeans, principally Peninsular Spaniards and settlers from the Canary Islands, whose migration to Cuba was substantial and sustained over several centuries.

==== Spanish settlers ====
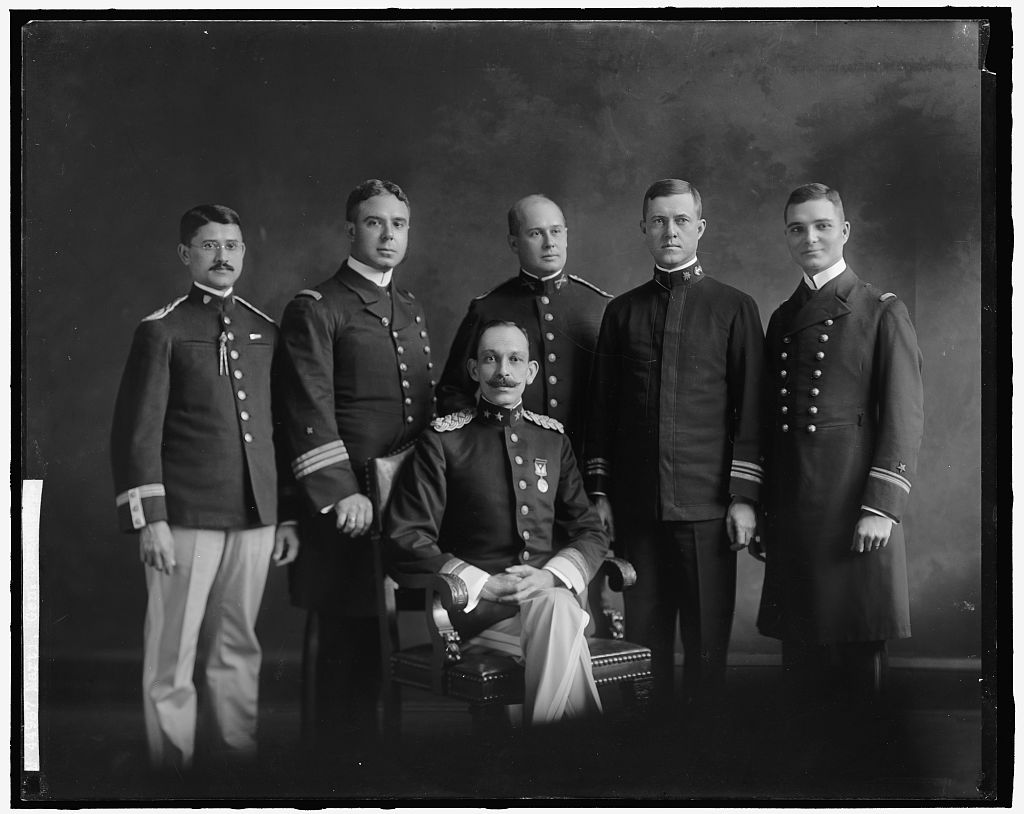
José Francisco Martí Zayas-Bazán (centre, seated), son of Cuban national hero José Martí, surrounded by Cuban officials.

Spanish settlement in Cuba began in 1492 and continued, in successive and demographically distinct waves, for more than four centuries. The island served simultaneously as the administrative hub of the Spanish Caribbean and as a transit point for the broader colonial enterprise, making it a preferred destination for settlers from virtually every region of Spain. The character of each migratory wave – its regional origin, social composition, and economic motivation – varied substantially over time, producing a stratified European heritage that reflects both colonial policy and the economic rhythms of successive eras.

==== Early colonisation (1492–c. 1762) ====
The first Spanish settlers arrived with Columbus's first voyage in 1492, among them sailors and soldiers from Andalusia and the Canary Islands; the fleet had departed from the Andalusian port of Palos de la Frontera, stopping at Gran Canaria en route. Formal colonisation of the island began in 1511 under Diego Velázquez de Cuéllar, who founded seven towns between 1511 and 1515, including Santiago de Cuba and Havana. The earliest settlers were predominantly from Extremadura and Andalusia, consistent with the composition of the early Caribbean expeditions, which departed primarily from Seville – at the time the monopoly port for transatlantic trade under the Casa de Contratación system (1503–1790). Throughout the sixteenth and seventeenth centuries, Cuba's population remained small and strategically oriented: Havana's natural harbour made it a mandatory stop for the Spanish treasure fleet, and the island functioned more as a logistical base than as an agricultural colony. Settlement was concentrated in a handful of coastal towns and supplemented intermittently by royal decrees promoting emigration from the Canary Islands, whose chronic demographic surplus made the Canarians a convenient and economical source of agricultural colonists for the Spanish Caribbean.

==== Canarians (isleños) ====
Of all the Spanish regional groups, the Canarians – known in Cuba as isleños (islanders) — exercised the most profound and lasting influence on Cuban demography, agriculture, and linguistic culture. Canarian emigration to Cuba was a continuous process from the early sixteenth century, organised in part through population contracts by which the Spanish Crown encouraged Canarian families to settle in underpopulated areas of its Caribbean colonies. Unlike the predominantly male migrations from the Iberian Peninsula, Canarian emigration was familial in character – including women, children, and extended family groups – which gave Canarian communities a distinctive capacity for rural demographic consolidation. Canarians were the primary agents of tobacco cultivation in Cuba, becoming the archetypal vegueros (tobacco farmers), and were decisive in the development of the Vuelta Abajo region of Pinar del Río, widely considered the world's foremost producer of premium cigar tobacco. Their role in town founding was equally significant: Santiago de las Vegas, among others, was established by Canarian immigrants specialising in tobacco production. After the Cuban Revolution, numerous cigar manufacturers of Canarian origin relocated to the Canary Islands, where they established a tobacco industry based on Cuban seeds and techniques. The linguistic imprint of Canarian settlement on Cuban Spanish is substantial and well documented. Cuban Spanish belongs to the same Atlantic dialectal continuum as Canarian Spanish, with which it shares seseo, yeísmo, the aspiration and weakening of consonants in syllable-final position, and an intonation that sets Caribbean Spanish apart from Peninsular varieties. Numerous everyday words in Cuban Spanish derive directly from Canarian usage, the most frequently cited being guagua (bus), a term of Canarian origin now in universal use in Cuba and other Caribbean dialects. Of the seven Canary Islands, La Palma is the one whose accent most closely approximates Cuban Spanish, reflecting centuries of migration and cultural exchange.

==== Andalusians ====
Andalusia constituted the legal and commercial gateway to the Americas throughout the colonial period. Under the Casa de Contratación system (1503–1790), all transatlantic trade was monopolised through Seville, with the result that Andalusian merchants, officials, clergy, and artisans were overrepresented in the earliest waves of Caribbean settlement. Andalusians figure among the founders of Havana and other early towns, and their dialect – characterised by seseo, the aspiration of /s/ before consonants, and open vowels – reinforced the phonological features that would become hallmarks of Cuban Spanish, acting in parallel with the Canarian influences that intensified during the nineteenth century. The Andalusian community maintained a significant presence in Havana's cultural life throughout the colonial period. Bullfighting, practised in Cuba from at least 1514 – the date of the first documented spectacle, recorded by Bartolomé de las Casas in his Historia de las Indias (Note: The earliest mention of bullfighting in Cuba appears in Bartolomé de las Casas's Historia de las Indias, where a contest involving "a bull or bulls" is recorded as having taken place on Corpus Christi 1514. The first formal bullfight is generally dated to 1538, in Santiago de Cuba, on the occasion of the arrival of Governor Hernando de Soto. This work should not be confused with the Historia general y natural de las Indias of Gonzalo Fernández de Oviedo.) — until its prohibition by American occupation forces in 1899, was sustained in large part by matadors and promoters from Cádiz and Seville.

==== Galicians ====
Galicia supplied one of the largest flows of Spanish emigrants to Cuba, to the point that the colloquial Cuban term for any Spaniard – regardless of regional origin – became gallego, and remains so today. This linguistic conflation reflects a demographic reality: on the eve of the First World War, Havana was home to the second-largest urban Galician community in the world, surpassed only by Buenos Aires. Galician emigration to Cuba intensified steadily from the mid-nineteenth century, reached its peak in the first two decades of the twentieth century, and left a structural imprint on Cuban commerce, urban architecture, and vernacular language. In Havana, Galician immigrants founded and financed the Centro Gallego de La Habana, which became one of the two most powerful mutual aid and cultural institutions on the island; its premises – a palatial building constructed on the western side of the Parque Central facing the Centro Asturiano — were nationalised after 1961 and today house the Gran Teatro de La Habana, the country's principal opera house. The Galician anthem, Os Pinos, received its world premiere in Havana on 20 December 1907, at the Teatro del Centro Gallego, reflecting the cultural weight of the diaspora community. Among the most prominent descendants of Galician immigrants is Fidel Castro, whose father, Ángel Castro Argiz, emigrated from the municipality of Láncara, in the province of Lugo. The Galician impact on Cuban vocabulary and speech was extensive; Galicians dominated broad sectors of the Havana commercial economy – running shops, cafés, and small businesses – and it was this everyday presence, rather than elite cultural influence, that transmitted linguistic elements into common usage.

==== Asturians ====
The Asturian community in Cuba stood alongside the Galician as one of the two numerically dominant Spanish regional groups of the late nineteenth and early twentieth centuries. Asturian immigrants settled primarily in Havana and the main provincial cities, concentrating in commerce, the food trade, and small-scale manufacturing. The Centro Asturiano de La Habana — erected directly opposite the Centro Gallego on the Parque Central – constituted the other great pillar of the Spanish mutual aid network in Cuba, offering its members healthcare, education, and social assistance. At its height, membership counted tens of thousands of affiliates. In 1900, when Cuba's total population stood at around 1.6 million, the three largest groups of Spanish-born residents – Galicians, Asturians, and Canarians – jointly accounted for 68% of the island's total Spanish immigrant population.

==== Catalans and other Peninsular groups ====
Catalans maintained a significant presence in Cuba from the eighteenth century, concentrated particularly in commerce and maritime trade. In Santiago de Cuba, Catalan merchants established themselves as key intermediaries in the port economy. By 1900, some 6,400 Catalans resided in Cuba – a disproportionately high figure relative to Catalonia's demographic weight within Spain as a whole, reflecting the region's mercantile traditions. Basques, Castilians, Valencians, and other Peninsular groups also contributed to the colonial and post-colonial population, though in absolute numbers they were smaller than the northwestern and southern Spanish groups.

==== Post-independence immigration (1898–c. 1931) ====
Paradoxically, the largest wave of Spanish emigration to Cuba did not occur during the colonial period but in the decades immediately following Cuban independence. Between 1902 and 1931, approximately 780,000 Spaniards constituted 60.8% of all immigrants arriving on the island during that period. The majority were young rural men from Galicia, Asturias, and the Canary Islands, drawn by wage labour in the rapidly expanding sugar industry. For four consecutive years between 1916 and 1920, Cuba was the leading destination for Spanish emigrants within Latin America, absorbing approximately 60% of total Spanish emigration to the region; between 1900 and 1930, it was surpassed only by Argentina. Historians have described the half-century between 1880 and 1930 as the largest episode of Spanish migration to the Americas in Spain's entire history, greater in numerical terms than all the preceding centuries of conquest and colonisation combined; of the more than three million Spanish emigrants of that period, approximately one third settled in Cuba. By 1920, Cuba's population had grown to nearly three million, of whom approximately 250,000 had been born in Spain. This post-independence wave substantially reinforced the demographic and cultural substrate of the island's population, consolidating the patterns of regional origin – principally Galician, Asturian, and Canarian – already established during the colonial period.

==== French ====
French immigration to Cuba occurred in two distinct waves. The first, during the eighteenth century, consisted of merchants, officials, and settlers who established a modest presence in Havana and the eastern provinces. The second – considerably larger and of greater consequence – was precipitated by the Haitian Revolution (1791–1804), when tens of thousands of French colonists and the enslaved people they brought with them fled Saint-Domingue and took refuge primarily in eastern Cuba. Historical estimates place the total number of French refugees of all social classes arriving in eastern Cuba during the period 1800–1809 at more than 20,000, with 1803 the year of greatest influx: according to contemporary sources cited in the historiography, some 27,000 French individuals arrived that year alone. The cumulative total for the entire period 1791–1810 may have been somewhat higher. They settled primarily in eastern Cuba – around Santiago de Cuba, Guantánamo, and Baracoa — where they introduced coffee cultivation on a significant scale and transformed the regional economy within a decade. Their descendants, known locally as Franco-haitianos, maintained a distinct cultural identity in eastern Cuba for several generations.

==== Italians ====
Italian immigration to Cuba was modest compared to that recorded in Argentina or Brazil. By the mid-nineteenth century a small community had taken shape, composed principally of intellectuals, architects, engineers, painters, and artists engaged in the embellishment of buildings and churches in Havana. In 1884 this community founded the Associazione Generale di Mutuo Soccorso (General Association of Mutual Aid) in Havana, and in 1891 the Sociedad de Beneficencia to assist the most needy. The consular register maintained from that date had accumulated more than three thousand registered persons by 1896, a figure the consul himself, Count Mario Compagnoni Marefoschi, considered inflated given deaths, departures, and the scarcity of new arrivals; he placed the actual resident community at between 1,500 and 2,000 persons. Some Italians participated in the Cuban War of Independence. The property developer Domenico "Dino" Pogolotti, a native of Giaveno in Piedmont, built Cuba's first planned working-class neighbourhood, which still bears his name.

==== British and Irish ====
The British presence in Cuba was decisively shaped by the British occupation of Havana between 1762 and 1763, during which British forces opened the port to free trade and substantially expanded the slave trade, accelerating the development of the island's sugar economy in ways whose effects persisted well beyond the occupation itself. Following the return of Havana to Spain under the Treaty of Paris of 1763, the British military and administrative presence withdrew from Cuba, but the commercial ties established during the occupation did not disappear entirely. A small community of British and Irish merchants continued to operate in Havana in the late eighteenth century, benefiting from the commercial reorientation driven by the post-1763 Bourbon reforms, which progressively integrated the Cuban economy into the northern Atlantic system.

==== Eastern Europeans ====
A small number of non-Jewish immigrants from Eastern Europe – Poles, Russians, Ukrainians, and others – settled in Cuba before and during the period of Soviet alignment. The most prominent pre-revolutionary presence was that of the Polish-born Carlos Roloff Mialofsky (Karol Rolow-Miałowski, 1842–1907), who arrived in Cuba around 1865 from the United States after serving in the Union Army during the American Civil War; he rose to the rank of major general in the Ejército Libertador and fought in both the Ten Years' War and the Cuban War of Independence. (Note: Some sources, including the Encyclopaedia Judaica, identify Roloff as a Polish Jew; his religious affiliation is a debated point in Cuban and Polish historiography.) In the 1920s and 1930s, several hundred Polish Jewish and non-Jewish families settled on the island – founding the Polish People's Union in 1927 – though Cuba typically served as a transit point toward the United States. During the period of Soviet alignment (1961–1991), a further wave of Eastern Europeans arrived in Cuba as technical advisers, military personnel, students, and professionals under bilateral agreements between Havana and Moscow, though the majority did not form permanent settlements of any significance. Following the dissolution of the Soviet Union, a small portion of this community remained on the island, primarily through mixed marriages and family ties.

=== Cubans of sub-Saharan African ancestry or Afro-Cubans ===
According to the national census of 2012, conducted by the Oficina Nacional de Estadística e Información (ONEI), 9.3% of the population – approximately 1.03 million people – self-identified as Black (which in Cuba denotes predominantly sub-Saharan ancestry), while an additional 26.6% identified as mulato and 64.1% as white. Combined, those identifying as Black or of mixed African descent account for approximately 35.9% of the officially enumerated population. These figures are, however, widely regarded by scholars as a significant undercount. Since Cuban census data on race rely on self-identification, they are affected by entrenched social stigma surrounding race and by blanqueamiento — the historical and continuing social pressure to identify as white or mixed rather than Black.

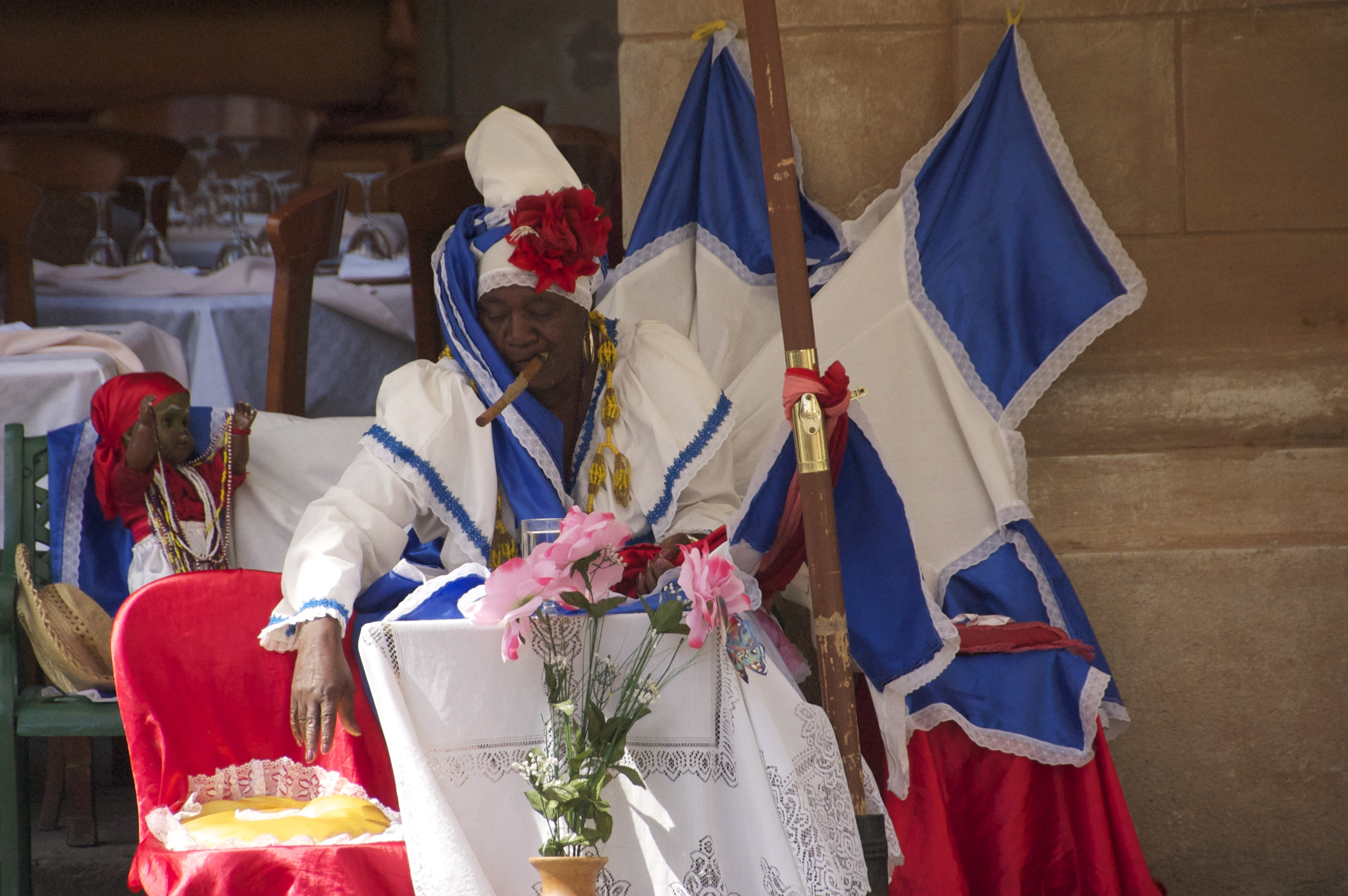
A Cuban woman wearing a bata cubana, the traditional Cuban rumba dress, in Havana's Plaza de Armas

The Institute for Cuban and Cuban-American Studies at the University of Miami estimated, by applying the one-drop rule — the hypodescent convention historically specific to the United States, under which any traceable African ancestry classifies a person as Black – that the proportion of Cubans with some degree of African ancestry, that could therefore be considered black, approached 62%., while other assessments place the figure higher still. However, the one-drop rule does not reflect Cuban or broader Latin American racial classification. In Cuba, as across most of Latin America, people of mixed African and European ancestry – commonly designated mulato/mestizo – have historically constituted and understood themselves as a distinct category, neither defined in opposition to Blackness nor in denial of it, but in acknowledgement of a mixed heritage that carries its own social and cultural meaning. The Cuban census formally recognises this through its separate mestizo o mulato classification.

Applying a binary Black/white framework derived from U.S. legal and social history to Cuban racial self-identification therefore imposes a classificatory logic that Cuban society does not use and that systematically erases the identities of a substantial portion of the population. As in much of Latin America and the Caribbean, racial classification in Cuba responds to social and class criteria as much as to somatic traits, and few Cubans are considered – or consider themselves – to be of wholly unmixed ancestry.

Genetic research offers additional perspective on the extent of sub-Saharan African ancestry in the Cuban population. A 2014 study published in PLOS Genetics, based on a sample of 1,019 individuals representative of all Cuban provinces and employing ancestry-informative markers (AIMs) alongside mitochondrial and Y chromosome markers, estimated the mean genetic composition of the Cuban population at approximately 72% European, 20% African, and 8% Amerindian ancestry. Among those who self-declared as Black, the estimated ancestral composition was approximately 65.5% African, 29% European, and 5.5% Amerindian – a degree of admixture consistent with the island's extended history of enslaved African importation and subsequent demographic mixing. The study also identified a pronounced geographical gradient: the highest proportions of African genetic ancestry were concentrated in the southeastern provinces of Guantánamo (approximately 40%) and Santiago de Cuba (approximately 39%), reflecting the historical concentration of plantation agriculture and enslaved African importation in Oriente. A sex-biased admixture pattern was further identified: European ancestry derived disproportionately from paternal Y-chromosome lineages, while African and Amerindian ancestry predominated in maternal mitochondrial lineages – a finding that reflects the gendered asymmetries of racial mixing in the colonial period.

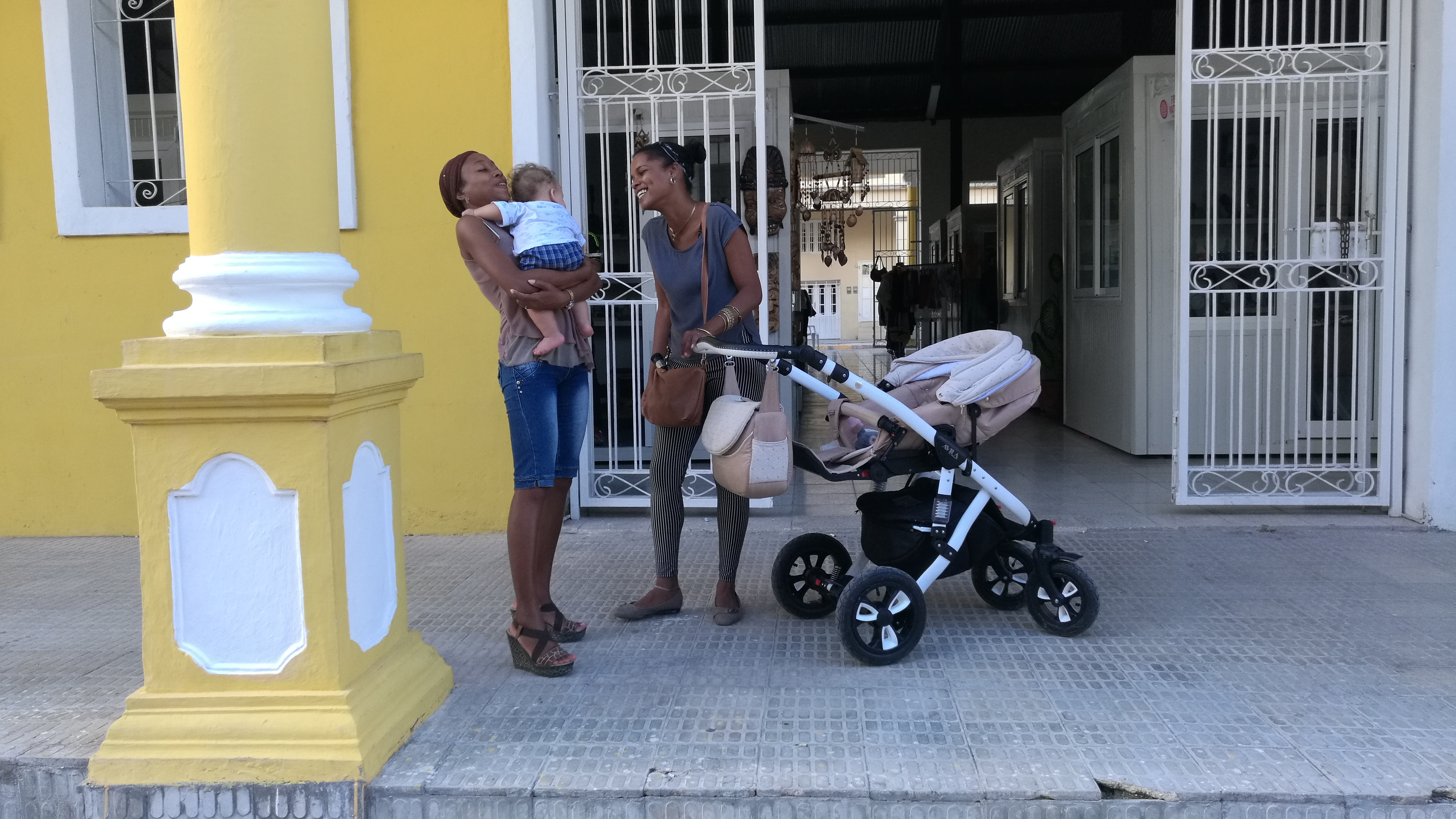
Cuban women with a child. Holguín, Cuba.

Although Afro-Cubans are found throughout the island, they are most concentrated in eastern Cuba, historically known as Oriente, where the legacy of the sugarcane and coffee plantation economies – and the massive importation of enslaved Africans and the long presence of their descendants – has shaped the region's demographic character for centuries. Later waves of Afro-Caribbean immigration reinforced this concentration: following the Haitian Revolution (1791–1804), tens of thousands of French colonists and the enslaved Africans they brought with them settled primarily around Guantánamo, establishing sugar and coffee plantations. Subsequently, Afro-Jamaican and Haitian workers continued to migrate to eastern Cuba as cane cutters during the early decades of the twentieth century. The proportion of Afro-Cubans within the total population increased markedly following the Cuban Revolution of 1959, when the mass emigration of predominantly white, middle-class Cubans – many of whom resettled in Miami and other American cities – fundamentally altered the island's demographic composition. Relatively few Afro-Cubans participated in the early waves of exile, partly because of the Revolution's declared commitment to racial equality and partly because Black Cubans had more limited access to the economic and social resources that facilitated emigration. The Minority Rights Group International estimates that Afro-descendants (including Cubans of mixed ancestry) may today constitute approximately 70% of the resident population, though this figure remains contested in the absence of a more reliable census methodology.

=== African ethnic groups of origin with descendants in Cuba ===
The Atlantic slave trade brought to Cuba people from a broad swath of sub-Saharan Africa, stretching from Senegambia to Mozambique, over more than three centuries (approximately 1520–1867). The Voyages: The Trans-Atlantic Slave Trade Database estimates that Cuba received approximately 900,000 enslaved Africans over this period, though estimates vary by methodology and database edition, ranging from just over 700,000 to more than one million, with a marked concentration in the second half of the eighteenth and the first half of the nineteenth centuries. Because slave traders and colonial administrators categorized African people under ethnic or regional designations that were frequently imprecise or arbitrary from an ethnological standpoint – and that often reflected the commercial networks of embarkation ports rather than actual ethnic identities – the African "nations" recorded in Cuban archives do not always correspond to discrete ethnic or linguistic groups. Nevertheless, the principal groups of origin can be identified with reasonable reliability.

==== Lucumí (Yoruba) ====
The term lucumí — whose etymology remains debated, though it may derive from the Yoruba greeting olùkù mi ("my friend") or from a toponym associated with the kingdom of Ulkumí — designates in Cuba the Yoruba-speaking Africans who originated primarily from the southwest of present-day Nigeria, southern Benin, and southeastern Togo. Their region of origin encompassed the territories of the Oyo Empire and the kingdoms of Egbado, Egba, Ketu, Ijebu, Ijesa, and Ekiti, as well as the city-state of Ifé, the spiritual centre of Yoruba religious life. Although Yoruba people were present in Cuba from the early stages of the slave trade, the bulk of their arrival was concentrated between the 1820s and the 1860s, as a direct consequence of the collapse of the Oyo Empire (c. 1817–1836) and the expansionist campaigns of the Sokoto Caliphate and the Emirate of Ilorin, which generated an extraordinary flow of Yoruba captives toward the Atlantic slave markets. The lucumí settled predominantly in Havana and Matanzas, where they formed cabildos and communities of notable cultural cohesion. Their religious legacy gave rise to Regla de Ocha — popularly known as Santería — and to Regla de Ifá, systems of worship centred on the orishas of the Yoruba pantheon: Obatalá, Shangó, Yemayá, Ogún, Ochún, Elegguá, among others. These traditions survived through syncretism with Roman Catholicism — the orishas were identified with Catholic saints – and today constitute one of the most influential religious systems of African origin in the Western Hemisphere. The Yoruba language was partially preserved as a liturgical language in Cuban ritual contexts, albeit with characteristic phonological and lexical modifications.

==== Congo (West-Central African Bantu peoples) ====
Under the generic designation congos, Cuban colonial records grouped Africans from West-Central Africa: principally from the Kingdom of Kongo, the Kingdom of Loango, and the regions of present-day northern Angola, western Democratic Republic of the Congo, and the Republic of the Congo. These were speakers of various Bantu languages, among which Kikongo and related languages predominated. In aggregate terms, the West-Central African Bantu peoples constituted one of the largest – and possibly the single largest – groups within the enslaved African population in Cuba across the full history of the trade. Their presence was continuous from the earliest decades of Spanish colonisation and persisted throughout the entire period of slavery. Unlike the lucumí, whose arrival in large numbers was late and concentrated, the congos arrived in sustained waves over centuries. Their religious and ritual legacy was expressed in Regla de Palo — also known as Palo Monte or Regla Conga – a tradition articulating the relationship between the living and the spirits of the dead (mpungos or nfumbis) through the nganga, a ritual vessel charged with natural elements and human remains. Regla de Palo retains a ritual vocabulary in Cuban Kikongo, a creolised language notable for its lexical conservatism. Although Catholicism also influenced this tradition, its syncretism is structurally distinct from that of Regla de Ocha.

==== Arará (Fon-Ewe and peoples of the Gulf of Benin) ====
The ararás in Cuba correspond to Africans from the Kingdom of Dahomey and the neighbouring kingdoms of present-day Benin, Togo, and southeastern Ghana: principally Fon, Ewe, Adja, and Mahi groups. The name derives from Ardra (Allada), the ancient Aja kingdom that served as one of the principal centres of the slave trade in the Gulf of Benin during the seventeenth and eighteenth centuries. Linguistically and culturally related to the Yoruba – with whom they share elements of the Gulf of Benin religious substrate – the ararás are nonetheless distinguished by their own ritual and mythological traditions. In Cuba they were concentrated particularly in the region of Matanzas, where they established their own cabildos and preserved traditions that gave rise to Regla Arará. This tradition venerates the voduns (functional equivalents of the lucumí orishas) under their own designations, with liturgies partially preserved in the Fon language. Regla Arará, less widespread than Regla de Ocha or Palo Monte, has been maintained primarily in the municipality of Jovellanos (Matanzas) and its surrounding area, where some ritual lineages of considerable antiquity survive.

==== Carabalí (peoples of the Bight of Biafra) ====
The term carabalí — derived from the toponym "Old Calabar", the principal slave-trading port at the mouth of the Cross River — grouped in Cuba Africans of heterogeneous origin from present-day southeastern Nigeria and southwestern Cameroon: principally Efik, Ibibio, Igbo, Ekoi, and other peoples of the Cross River basin and the Niger Delta. They arrived in significant numbers principally during the eighteenth century and the early nineteenth. The carabalí are historically associated in Cuba with the founding of the Sociedad Secreta Abakuá (also known as ñáñigos), established in Regla in 1836 as a Cuban adaptation of the Ekpe (leopard) societies of the Cross River basin peoples, particularly the Efik. The Abakuá is a male initiatory brotherhood with its own mythology, system of signs (anaforuanas), and a ritual language partially derived from Efik. It spread through Havana, Matanzas, and Cárdenas, becoming one of the most distinctive and durable cultural institutions of Cuban Africanism. Beyond its religious dimension, the Abakuá historically served a function of solidarity and mutual protection among dock workers and the urban popular classes.

==== Gangá (peoples of Upper Guinea) ====
The gangás in Cuba were Africans from Upper Guinea — present-day Sierra Leone, Guinea, Liberia, and bordering areas – and constituted a heterogeneous ethnic grouping that included, among others, speakers of Mende, Temne, Susu, and related languages. The term "gangá" does not correspond to a precise ethnic identity but is a collective trading designation, possibly derived from a regional toponym. They arrived principally during the seventeenth century and the first half of the nineteenth, and although numerous in colonial records, they were generally less culturally cohesive than the lucumí or the congos. In Cuba, the gangás established their own cabildos but did not produce a distinct religious tradition of comparable reach to those of other groups. Their practices gradually merged with those of the lucumí and the congos, though vestiges of ritual songs in Upper Guinea languages have been documented in certain communities of Matanzas Province, notably in the municipality of Perico, where the historian Emma Christopher identified fragments of a ritual tradition in Banta — a nearly extinct language of the Moyamba District of Sierra Leone – preserved by the community known as Ganga-Longoba.

==== Mandinga (Mande peoples and Muslim communities) ====
Under the term mandinga — the Cuban and Antillean equivalent of "Mandé" or "Manding" — were grouped Africans of Mande-speaking origin from Senegambia, Guinea-Bissau, Guinea, and the regions of the upper Niger: Wolof, Mandinka, Bambara, Soninké, Fulani (Fula/Peul), and related groups. They arrived primarily during the seventeenth century and the first half of the eighteenth, a period when Senegambia was one of the principal catchment areas of the Atlantic slave trade. A notable characteristic of this group is that a substantial proportion of its members were Muslim — in some cases with formal religious education in Arabic — which distinguished them from Africans of indigenous religious tradition and from those already partially Christianised in the Kongo. In Cuba and the broader Caribbean, Muslim Mandingas were sometimes identified by their prayer practices, the use of amulets containing Quranic texts (tilas or resguardos), abstention from pork, and literacy in Arabic. Although the pressures of the slave system and forced evangelisation largely extinguished these practices across generations, scholars including Sylviane Diouf — in her study Servants of Allah (1998) — have documented traces of Islamic practice among enslaved Africans in Cuba and elsewhere in the Americas well into the nineteenth century.

==== Mina (Akan and peoples of the Gold Coast) ====
The term mina — derived from Fort São Jorge da Mina (Elmina), in present-day Ghana, the principal Portuguese base on the Gold Coast — designated in Cuba and the Hispanic Caribbean Africans from the Gold Coast, principally speakers of Akan languages: Fante, Asante, Akyem, and neighbouring groups. They arrived principally during the eighteenth century, coinciding with the expansion of the Asante Empire and the conflicts it generated in the region.

The mina in Cuba did not produce a religious tradition as cohesive or identifiable as those of the lucumí or the congos, and their practices were absorbed into the broader substrate of Afro-Cuban religiosity. Some scholars nonetheless note that elements of the Akan religious tradition – including cults to the abosom (nature spirits) and distinctive divinatory practices – may be traceable in the syncretic-ritual components of certain Cuban communities, though these are difficult to distinguish from Yoruba contributions given the cultural and geographical proximity of both traditions in West Africa.

==== Other groups: Fulani, Wolof, and Makua ====
In addition to the principal groups described above, Cuban colonial records document smaller numbers of individuals and communities from other African regions. The Fula (Fulani or Peul), semi-nomadic pastoralists distributed across West and Central Africa, arrived principally as captives of the jihadist wars of the eighteenth and nineteenth centuries in the western Sahel; like the Mandingas, many were Muslim. The series of Fula jihads that swept the region from Futa Jallon and Futa Toro to the Sokoto Caliphate — beginning in 1725 and continuing into the 1860s – generated large numbers of war captives, many of whom entered the Atlantic slave trade through networks documented by scholars of Muslim identity in the African diaspora. The Wolof, originating from Senegambia, were present primarily in the earliest periods of the trade and left some onomastic traces in Cuban colonial archives. David Wheat's study of Upper Guinean captives in the early Spanish Caribbean demonstrates that Senegambian groups, including the Wolof, formed a substantial proportion of enslaved arrivals in Havana and other ports during the period 1570–1640, before the trade shifted toward Angola and the Bight of Benin. At the opposite geographical extreme, individuals designated macuas or mozambiques are documented in Cuba, originating from East Africa – principally from the Makua region of northern Mozambique and southern Tanzania; their presence, though limited in scale, was more significant in Brazil and Cuba than in other Euro-American colonies, primarily through the slave trade operated by Portuguese and Brazilian traffickers during the nineteenth century.

=== Multiracial Cubans ===
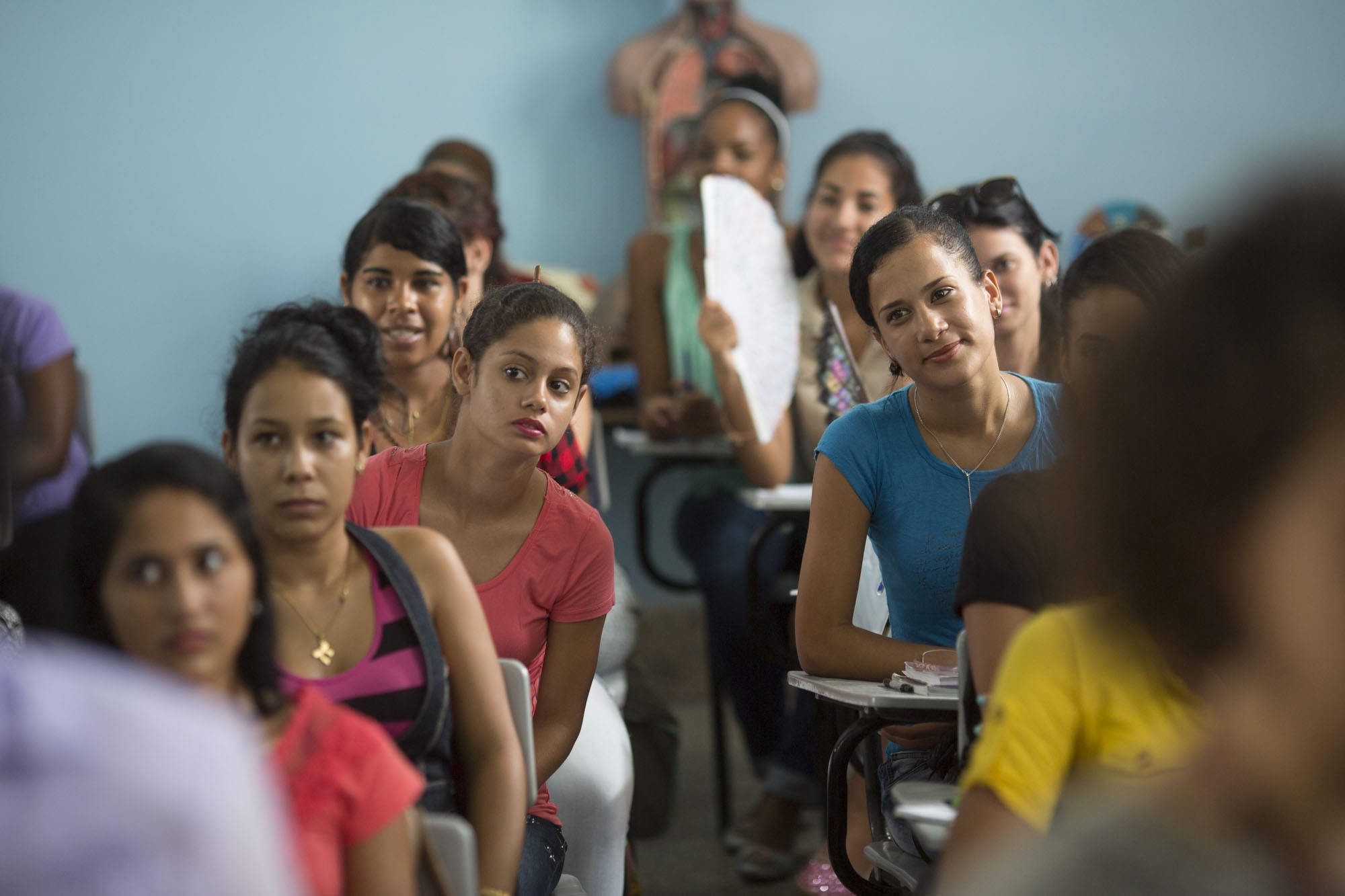
Cuban women attend a meeting with U.S. Second Lady Jill Biden during her official visit to Cuba, October 2016.

In the 2012 census, 26.6% of the population (2.97 million people) identified as mulato or mestizo. In Cuban usage, the term mestizo functions as a broad demographic and social category encompassing anyone of mixed racial ancestry, and is not restricted—as it largely is throughout continental Latin America—to persons of specifically indigenous and European descent. The process of mestizaje—continuous racial and cultural mixing—began a few decades after Spanish colonization in the early sixteenth century, when predominantly male Spanish settlers formed unions with or fathered children by Taíno women and, progressively, with enslaved African women and their descendants.

The vast majority of Cubans who today identify as mestizo or mulato are not first-generation descendants of a single interracial union but bear the accumulated legacy of racial mixing across many generations—in some family lines extending across four or five centuries. Genomic studies based on ancestry informative markers estimate that the average Cuban carries approximately 72% European, 20% African, and 8% Amerindian ancestry on autosomal markers, while the eastern provinces show substantially higher African and indigenous contributions than the western ones. Genetic studies further document a pronounced sex bias in the admixture process: male lineages are predominantly European—as evidenced by Y chromosome data—while female lineages carry predominantly African and Native American contributions—as detected via mitochondrial DNA—a pattern consistent with the demographic asymmetries of the colonial plantation economy. Notably, the complete absence of indigenous paternal lineages implies that virtually all Amerindian ancestry in the Cuban population is transmitted through the maternal line.

The ideology of mestizaje has been central to Cuban national identity since the nineteenth century, particularly through the writings of José Martí—especially his essay "Nuestra América" (1891)—and was further reinforced after the Cuban Revolution of 1959, when racial mixing was officially promoted as evidence of a classless and post-racial society. Critics have identified this framing as a mechanism for suppressing, rather than resolving, persistent racial inequalities.

==== Mulato ====
In Cuba, mulato (feminine mulata; most likely derived from Latin mulus, meaning 'mule', evoking the colonial metaphor of racial hybridity, though some etymologists have proposed an alternative derivation from Arabic muwallad) refers broadly to a person of mixed African and European ancestry. The term was originally applied in colonial legal and ecclesiastical records to the first-generation offspring of one African and one European parent, but broadened in popular Cuban usage to encompass any person displaying a phenotypic mixture of African and European traits, regardless of generational distance.

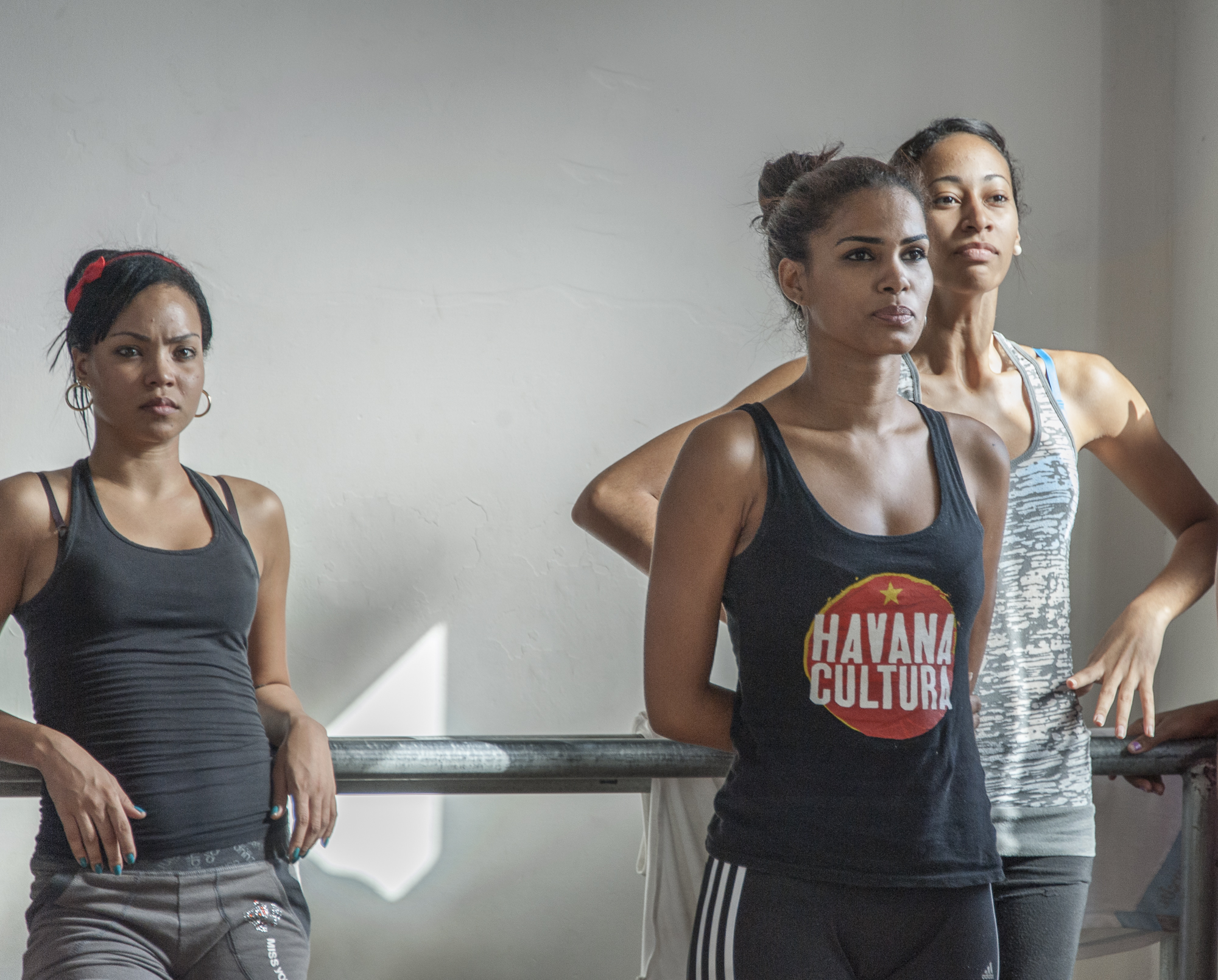
Cuban contemporary dancers in Havana, January 2014. Photo: Marjorie Kaufman.

Unlike the one-drop rule predominant in the United States—entrenched as social practice in the decades following the American Civil War but legally formalized only in the early twentieth century, when states such as Tennessee (1910) and Virginia (1924) codified it into law—Spanish colonial law recognized a spectrum of racial gradations. Mechanisms such as the gracias al sacar—a royal dispensation formalized by the Spanish Crown in 1795, onerous and in practice accessible mainly to persons of some economic standing—allowed individuals of mixed ancestry to petition for official reclassification as Spanish, thereby conferring on the category mulato a distinct identity in both legal and social terms rather than subsuming it within a binary racial framework.

The figure of the mulata took on powerful national and aesthetic symbolic resonance in Cuban culture from the nineteenth century onward, idealized as the embodiment of Cuban racial synthesis in literature, music, and the visual arts. This trope has nonetheless been widely criticized by scholars for sexualizing and objectifying Afro-Cuban women and for aestheticizing racial mixing while leaving intact the underlying hierarchies of anti-Black discrimination. Admixture studies conducted on Havana-based samples of self-identified mulatos have found European ancestry proportions typically ranging between 57% and 59%, and West African ancestry proportions between 41% and 43%, though individual variation is considerable; these figures should not be taken as representative of Cuba as a whole, given the marked genetic gradient between the country's western and eastern provinces.

==== Jabao ====
Jabao (also spelled javao; feminine jabá or javá) is a colloquial Cuban racial classification term designating a person with light or near-white skin but whose African ancestry remains visually perceptible through other phenotypic markers—most characteristically, very tightly coiled or curled hair (referred to in Cuban vernacular, at times pejoratively, as pelo malo)—as well as facial features associated with African descent. The term is used throughout the Hispanic Caribbean, including Puerto Rico and the Dominican Republic.

The variant jabao capirro designates, in Cuban colloquial usage, a jabao who additionally has blond or reddish hair; the use of this compound expression is documented in Cuban lexicographic and ethnographic sources, though it is considerably less widely attested than the simple term. The category illustrates the broader Cuban system of racial classification by phenotype rather than by documented ancestry; popular expressions such as los jabao no tienen raza ('the jabao have no race') reflect the liminal and ambiguous status of the jabao within Cuban racial taxonomy.

=== Cubans of East Asian descent ===
Cuba's official censuses classified residents of East Asian descent under the racial category of "yellow" from at least 1899 through 1981—a designation widely criticized in scholarship as reductive and inadequate. The category was abolished in the 2002 national census, which reduced Cuba's official racial classification to three categories: white (blanco), black (negro), and mixed-race (mestizo). External demographic estimates place Cubans of Asian descent at roughly 1% of the total population, the large majority of Chinese origin.

==== Chinese Cubans ====
Chinese immigration to Cuba began in 1847, when colonial planters began importing contract laborers to offset a growing labor shortage as international abolitionism curtailed the transatlantic slave trade. Between 1847 and 1874, an estimated 141,000 to 150,000 men—recruited largely through coercive or fraudulent conditions from Guangdong—were shipped to Cuba under eight-year indenture contracts; approximately 125,000 survived the voyage. Because the migrant pool was almost exclusively male—women reportedly constituting under 1% of arrivals—intermarriage with Afro-Cuban and white Cuban women was common, producing a substantial mixed-descent population over subsequent generations.

Contemporaries and later historians have broadly characterized this coolie indenture regime as functionally indistinguishable from slavery, observing that Chinese workers toiled alongside enslaved Africans under comparable conditions of coercion, violence, and juridical unfreedom.

After completing their contracts, many former coolies settled permanently in Cuba, establishing small businesses and mutual-aid associations. Havana's Barrio Chino grew into the largest Chinatown in Latin America, with the ethnic Chinese population in Cuba peaking at approximately 40,000 in the early decades of the twentieth century. Chinese Cubans participated significantly in both the Ten Years' War (1868–1878) and the Cuban War of Independence (1895–1898). Their military role is commemorated by the Monumento al Soldado Chino in Vedado, Havana—an eight-metre granite column erected in 1931—whose bronze plaque bears the inscription: No hubo un chino cubano desertor. No hubo un chino cubano traidor ("There was no Chinese Cuban (who was a) deserter. There was no Chinese Cuban (who was a) traitor").

The Cuban Revolution of 1959 effectively dismantled the community. Nationalization of private enterprise under Fidel Castro drove out most Chinese Cubans—predominantly small-scale merchants and restaurateurs—chiefly to Miami and elsewhere in Latin America. Only an estimated few hundred ethnic Chinese remain on the island today; the Barrio Chino has been widely characterized as a Chinatown without Chinese.

==== Filipino Cubans ====
Cubans of Filipino descent represent one of the island's oldest Asian communities, with a presence documented from the sixteenth century. Filipino workers and sailors arrived via the Manila–Acapulco galleon trade (1565–1815) and settled primarily in the western tobacco-producing region that colonial authorities designated Nueva Filipinas ("New Philippines"), today Pinar del Río. Over subsequent centuries, this community was largely absorbed into the general Cuban population through intermarriage, leaving no ethnically distinct Filipino community today.

==== Japanese Cubans ====
The Japanese community in Cuba is small. The first significant groups arrived via Mexico between 1910 and 1916, many fleeing the violence of the Mexican Revolution. Following the attack on Pearl Harbor, the Batista government declared war on Japan on 9 December 1941; on 12 December, all Japanese residents in Cuba were formally designated enemy aliens. Most were subsequently arrested and deported to the United States for wartime internment.

==== Korean Cubans ====
Cuban Koreans descend from approximately 288 workers who relocated from the Yucatán Peninsula, Mexico, to Cuba in May 1921. Their ancestors had been among 1,033 Koreans who emigrated to the Yucatán in 1905 under similarly coercive contract-labor arrangements, originally destined for henequen plantations. Their descendants—estimated at 800—are concentrated principally in Havana, Matanzas, and other areas of the island.

=== Cubans of Arab descent ===
Cuba's Arab community descends primarily from Levantine emigrants – mainly from present-day Lebanon, Syria, and Palestine — who began arriving in the 1870s, fleeing Ottoman conscription, political instability, famine, and sectarian violence. Because they traveled on Ottoman imperial passports, Cuban authorities labeled them turcos ("Turks"), a misnomer that persisted for decades. The main immigration wave ran from the 1890s through the 1930s, peaking around World War I and its aftermath; by the 1930s, the Arab community in Cuba numbered approximately 34,000.

Immigrants were predominantly Arab Christians — Maronite, Greek Orthodox, and other Eastern rite Christians – with a smaller Muslim minority. Most settled in Havana, particularly in the Barrio Monte district, following the typical Levantine immigrant trajectory in Latin America: beginning as itinerant textile and goods peddlers before accumulating sufficient capital to open fixed commercial establishments. The community established formal institutions, including the Syrian Society of Havana (1918), the Palestinian Society (1919), and the Lebanese Society of Havana (1920). The Arab Union of Cuba (Unión Árabe de Cuba, UAC), reconstituted in 1979, remains the community's principal institutional anchor.

The 1959 Revolution dismantled the community's economic base through the nationalization of private commerce, prompting significant emigration, though a substantial portion of the community remained on the island. Cuba was the only Latin American state to vote against United Nations General Assembly Resolution 181 — the 1947 Palestine partition plan — a position attributed to both Cuba's anti-colonial principles and the political influence of its Arab community.

=== Cuban Jews ===
The Cuban Jewish community is one of the oldest and most historically layered in the Caribbean, with roots traceable to the earliest years of Spanish colonization. Luis de Torres—a converso who served as Columbus's interpreter of Arabic and Hebrew—figures in the historical record as one of the first Europeans to set foot on Cuban soil in 1492. A modern, organized, and sustained community, however, only emerged in the twentieth century, through three distinct waves of immigration: Ashkenazi Jews who arrived alongside the expansion of US commercial interests after 1898 and who founded the United Hebrew Congregation in 1906; Sephardic Jews from the Ottoman Empire, primarily from Turkey and the Levant, who accounted for approximately 90 percent of the island's roughly 1,000 Jews by 1918; and Eastern European Ashkenazi Jews who arrived from the 1920s onward, most of them Yiddish-speaking and stranded in Cuba by the quotas imposed by the Immigration Act of 1924.

Cuba was also the setting for one of the most thoroughly documented episodes in the history of wartime refugee policy. On 13 May 1939, the German ocean liner MS St. Louis departed Hamburg for Havana carrying 937 passengers, nearly all of them Jews fleeing Nazi Germany. Cuban President Federico Laredo Brú annulled by executive decree all previously issued disembarkation certificates, and when the ship arrived in Havana on 27 May, only 28 passengers whose documentation was in order were allowed to disembark. After being similarly turned away by the United States and Canada, the ship was compelled to return to Europe; of the 907 passengers who sailed back, approximately 254 subsequently perished in the Holocaust.

At its peak in the 1950s, the Cuban Jewish community numbered around 15,000. The Revolution of 1959 and the nationalization of private commerce—a sector in which Cuban Jews were heavily concentrated—prompted between 90 and 94 percent of the community to emigrate. Today approximately 1,500 remain, the majority in Havana, with an exceptionally high intermarriage rate and no resident rabbi since the revolution.

== Genetics ==
Genetic studies characterize the Cuban population as substantially admixed, reflecting the island's history of European colonization, the forced migration of enslaved Africans, and the prior presence of indigenous populations.

An autosomal admixture study of 1,019 individuals drawn from all Cuban provinces, published in 2014, estimated average genetic ancestry of 72% European, 20% African, and 8% Native American. There is substantial intra-island variation: western provinces exhibit a higher average European ancestry, while eastern provinces—most notably Guantánamo and Santiago de Cuba, where African ancestry reaches approximately 39–40%—show markedly elevated African and Native American contributions. These geographic patterns are consistent with historical and demographic records.

A 2018 genome-wide study of 860 individuals further identified the Iberian population as the closest proxy for the European component, West Central and Central African populations for the African component, and South American and Mesoamerican populations for the Native American component. Both the 2014 and 2018 studies identified a strongly sex-biased pattern in the admixture process: European ancestry is proportionally higher in paternal (Y-chromosome) lineages, while African and Native American ancestry is more strongly represented in maternal (mtDNA) lineages. This asymmetry reflects the historical demographics of the colonial period, in which Spanish immigration consisted predominantly of men, who mixed primarily with indigenous and enslaved African women.

An early study of residents of Pinar del Río, published in 1995 in the context of an investigation into epidemic optic neuropathy, analyzed mitochondrial DNA haplotypes and found that approximately 50% of mtDNA lineages traced to European sources, 46% to African, and 4% to Native American origins, consistent with the demographic history and census composition of that province.

A broader 2008 study sampling individuals from multiple Cuban provinces found a different national-level mtDNA distribution: approximately 22% of sequences were of West Eurasian origin (European and Middle Eastern), 45% of African origin, and 33% of Native American origin. The considerably lower West Eurasian fraction in the maternal lineages, compared to the autosomal estimate, reflects the sex-biased nature of Cuban colonial-era admixture. Regarding Y-chromosome haplogroups (paternal lineages), the same 2008 study found that approximately 79% of Cuban male sequences are of West Eurasian origin, approximately 20% of African origin, and approximately 1.5% of East Asian origin; no Native American paternal lineages were detected. Among the West Eurasian fraction, the majority of individuals belong to haplogroup R1b, the predominant Western European paternal lineage. The African haplogroups detected in Cubans derive from both Western African sources (haplogroups E1a, E1b1a) and North African sources (E1b1b-M81). The North African haplogroup E-M81, which is characteristic of Berber populations and is also elevated in the Canary Islands, is present in Cuban males at a frequency of approximately 6.1%. According to Fregel et al. (2009), autochthonous male (E-M81) and female (U6) haplogroup lineages of indigenous Guanche derivation from the Canary Islands have been detected in populations across Iberoamerica, indicating that Canary Islanders with indigenous North African-derived ancestry participated actively in the colonization of the Americas.

== Diaspora ==
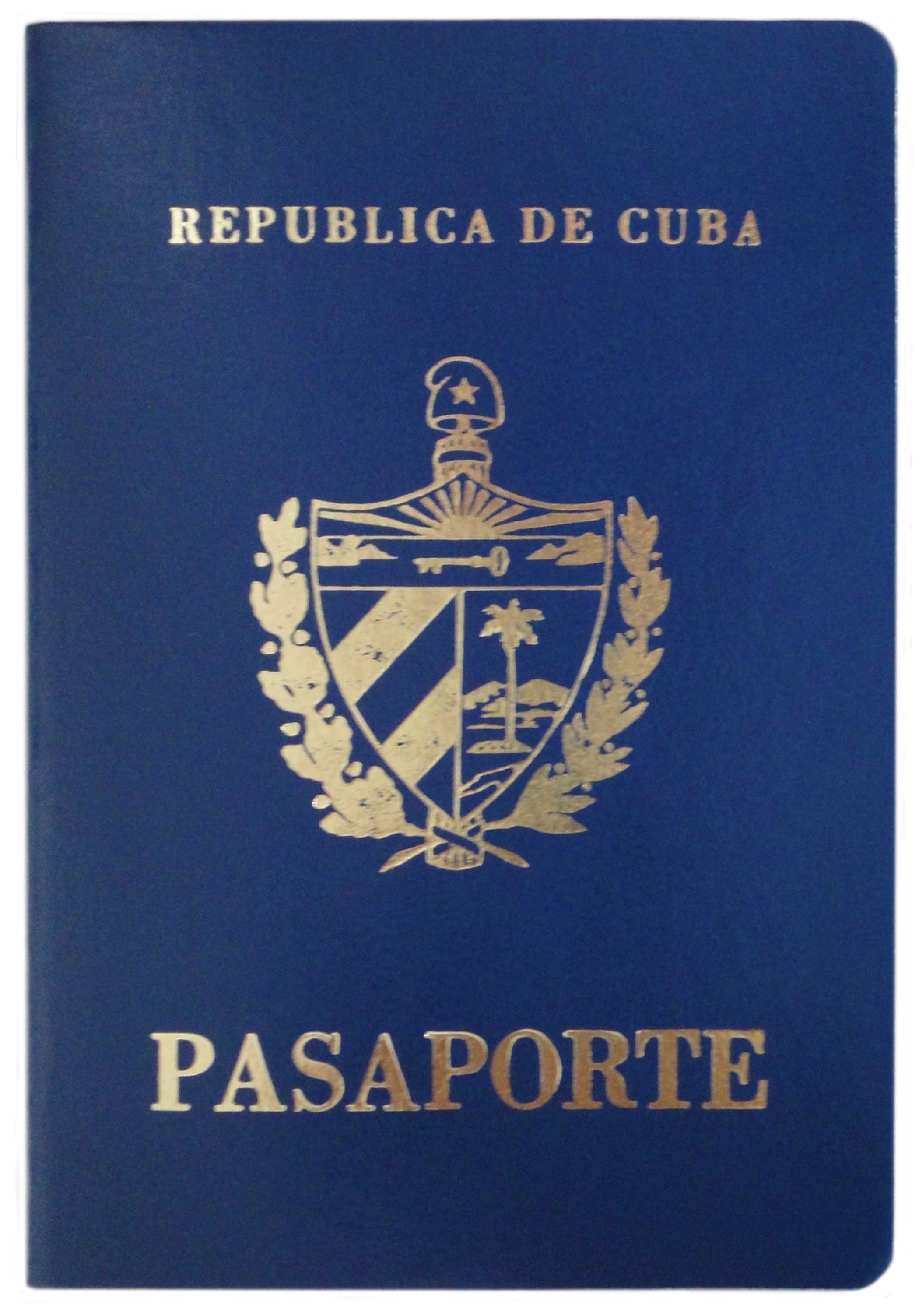
Current Cuban passport.

The Cuban diaspora is one of the most sustained and well-documented migratory phenomena in the Western Hemisphere. Over more than a century and a half—from the first communities of tobacco workers and political exiles in the nineteenth century to the migration crisis unfolding since 2021—emigration has been a structural constant in Cuban history, intertwined with political upheaval, economic crises, and the character of successive governing regimes. The tobacco worker and independence-era exile communities of Key West, Tampa, and New York City were precursors to one of the most significant exoduses of the twentieth century, which in its contemporary phase has produced a demographic hemorrhage without precedent among Latin American nations.

=== The nineteenth-century proto-diaspora: tobacco industry, independence, and political exile ===
The history of Cuban emigration as an organized, politically conscious phenomenon does not begin with the revolution of 1959 but in the nineteenth century, against the backdrop of the independence wars against Spanish colonial rule. From the mid-1800s, groups of Cubans—primarily tobacco industry workers and sectors of the Creole petty bourgeoisie—had established stable communities in Florida, New York, and other northeastern US cities, as well as in Mexico, Spain, and Venezuela.

The development of the tobacco industry in Florida drove the first significant concentrations of Cuban emigrants on US soil. Entrepreneur Vicente Martinez Ybor relocated his factory to the outskirts of Tampa in 1885, founding Ybor City, conceived as an industrial and residential complex for tobacco workers, mostly Cubans, Spaniards, and Sicilians. A fire in Key West in 1886 accelerated the transfer of workers to Tampa, consolidating Ybor City as the largest Cuban community in the nineteenth-century United States. Key West had itself harbored a substantial colony of Cuban cigar workers who, through the practice of the lector de tabaquería, sustained the patriotic and independence-minded ethos of the Cuban emigrant community.

These communities also served as nodes of political agitation and fundraising for the independence movement. José Martí visited Tampa on multiple occasions; it was at the Liceo Cubano in Ybor City that he delivered, on 26 November 1891, some of his best-known speeches—Con todos y para el bien de todos and Los pinos nuevos. In 1892, in Tampa, he drafted the programmatic charter of the Cuban Revolutionary Party. Working-class communities in Key West, Ybor City, and West Tampa contributed regular donations to the war effort, and some of their members participated in the military expeditions that landed in Cuba.

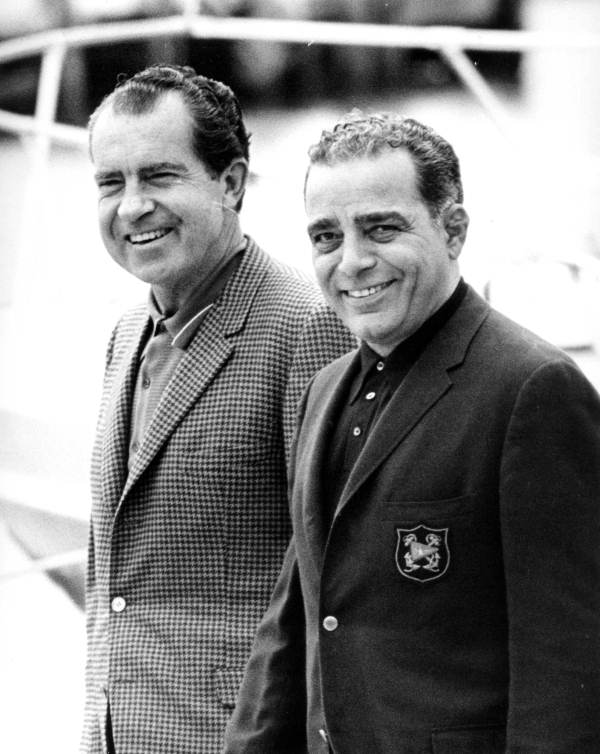
President Richard Nixon with his friend and confidant Charles "Bebe" Rebozo, a banker whose family emigrated to Tampa in the late nineteenth century as part of the pre-revolutionary Cuban diaspora. A close associate of Nixon for more than two decades, Rebozo exerted a discreet but considerable influence and was a central figure in his circle at Key Biscayne, Florida.

This first Cuban emigration was doubly characterized: as a labor migration—driven by disruptions in the tobacco and sugar markets and the political turbulence of colonial rule—and as a political diaspora organized around the independence project. The Cuban colony in New York, where Martí resided for extended periods and coordinated exile political activity, reinforced this dimension: Cuban intellectuals, journalists, and political figures articulated, through the Spanish-language press and civic organization, a Cuban national identity in exile before the independent state had come into existence.

With the conclusion of the independence war, the US military intervention of 1898, and the establishment of the Cuban Republic in 1902 under the Platt Amendment, many emigrants returned. Nevertheless, migratory currents between Cuba and the United States did not cease. On the eve of 1 January 1959, approximately 60,600 Cubans resided in the United States, with the largest concentration in New York.

A distinct episode within this period involves the opponents of Fulgencio Batista's regime (1952–1958), whose 1952 coup disrupted constitutional order and drove politicians, intellectuals, and democratic activists into exile—many of them to Mexico, where Fidel Castro organized the Granma expedition. Paradoxically, some of these anti-Batista exiles became, a few years later, among the first emigrants of post-revolutionary Cuba.

=== The post-revolutionary exodus (1959–1962): the "Golden Exile" ===
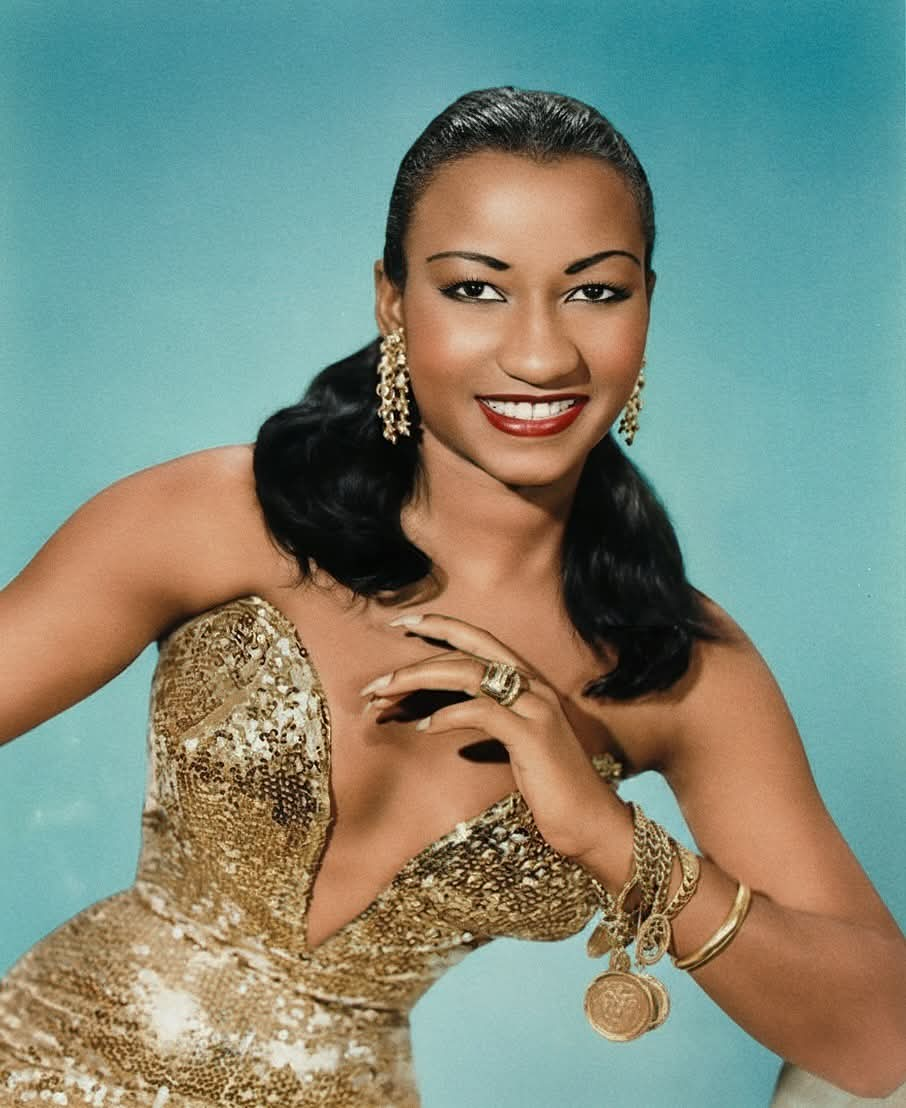
Celia Cruz (Havana, 1925 – New Jersey, 2003), known as the "Queen of Salsa", photographed in 1957. A vocalist with La Sonora Matancera, she left Cuba in July 1960 and was subsequently barred from returning. She became a symbol of the Cuban exile and one of the most internationally prominent Latin voices of the twentieth century.

The establishment of the revolutionary government on 1 January 1959, triggered an unprecedented wave of mass emigration. Within six months, approximately 500 exiles had arrived in Miami; by end-1960 the figure had risen to 33,000, and by October 1962—when the Cuban Missile Crisis severed commercial air links between the two countries—approximately 250,000 Cubans had emigrated.

This first wave was designated the "Golden Exile", a reference to its predominantly privileged sociological composition. The first to leave were collaborators of the Batista regime; they were followed by a larger contingent of upper- and upper-middle-class Cubans: business owners, professionals, merchants, executives, and families with economic ties to US capital. The policies that drove this initial exodus included the forced redistribution of private property, the nationalization of religious and private schools, the suppression of civil associations, and the sweeping nationalizations of enterprises and industries from mid-1960 onward. The government's alignment with the Soviet bloc, unambiguous throughout 1960 and officially proclaimed in 1961, reinforced the conviction among emigrants that return was foreclosed. The Cuban government, which from the outset characterized emigrants as gusanos ("worms"), promoted an image of a class-privileged diaspora that distorted the political dimensions of the exile.

Among the most extensively documented episodes of this period is Operation Peter Pan, organized between 1960 and 1962 with the participation of the Cuban Catholic Church, the Catholic Church in Miami, and the US government. Concerned that the state would assume increasing control over the upbringing of minors, thousands of families sent their children abroad unaccompanied. Between December 1960 and October 1962, more than 14,000 Cuban children traveled alone to the United States and were placed with foster families or religious institutions in Florida and other states.

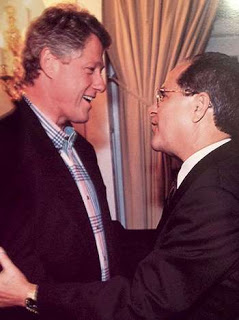
Jorge Mas Canosa with President Bill Clinton. Founder of the Cuban American National Foundation (CANF) in 1981, Mas Canosa was the most influential political figure of the Cuban exile and the principal organizer of Cuban-American lobby pressure on Washington foreign policy during the Reagan, Bush, and Clinton administrations.

The impact of this first wave on Miami was transformative. The Kennedy administration created the Cuban Refugee Program in 1961. The Cuban Adjustment Act, enacted in 1966 and signed by President Johnson, allowed any Cuban national present in the United States for at least one year to apply for lawful permanent residence, regardless of manner of entry.

=== The Freedom Flights (1965–1973) ===
The period between the October 1962 missile crisis and the opening of the port of Camarioca in September 1965 was marked by a reduction in large-scale migration, though clandestine emigration continued. In September 1965, the Cuban government opened Camarioca and announced that Cubans abroad could collect relatives by sea. Hundreds of vessels set out from Florida and approximately 5,000 Cubans emigrated before the port was closed in October. This episode served as the prelude to a bilateral agreement that opened a regulated emigration channel: the Freedom Flights.

Between December 1965 and April 1973, two daily flights connected Varadero with Miami. Through this program, approximately 260,600 Cubans emigrated to the United States. The demographic profile of this wave already differed from the Golden Exile: middle and working classes were more prominently represented, though the Cuban government imposed restrictions to retain men of working age and professionals in sectors deemed strategic.

During these years, Miami consolidated its role as the capital of the Cuban exile. Calle Ocho (Southwest 8th Street) became the commercial and cultural axis of Little Havana, and the Cuban-American community developed growing political influence at the local, state, and ultimately federal levels.

The "Cuban success" narrative was subject to critical revision from the 1970s onward. The image of a homogeneously white, conservative, and economically successful diaspora obscured the experiences of Black and mixed-race Cubans, the working classes, and those who faced discrimination within the exile community itself. Afro-Cubans constituted only approximately 3% of arrivals between 1959 and 1973—a disproportion reflecting both the composition of the early cohorts and the effects of official revolutionary rhetoric, which cast emigration as a class betrayal with explicit racial connotations.

=== The Mariel exodus (1980) ===
The period from 1973 to 1980 saw a slowdown in mass migration flows. Within Cuba, mounting social tension had accumulated: the failure of the 1970 ten-million-ton sugar harvest had eroded the regime's legitimacy, and the cultural repression symbolized by the Padilla affair of 1971—when poet Heberto Padilla was detained and coerced into a public self-criticism—had alienated sectors of the intelligentsia both inside and outside the island.

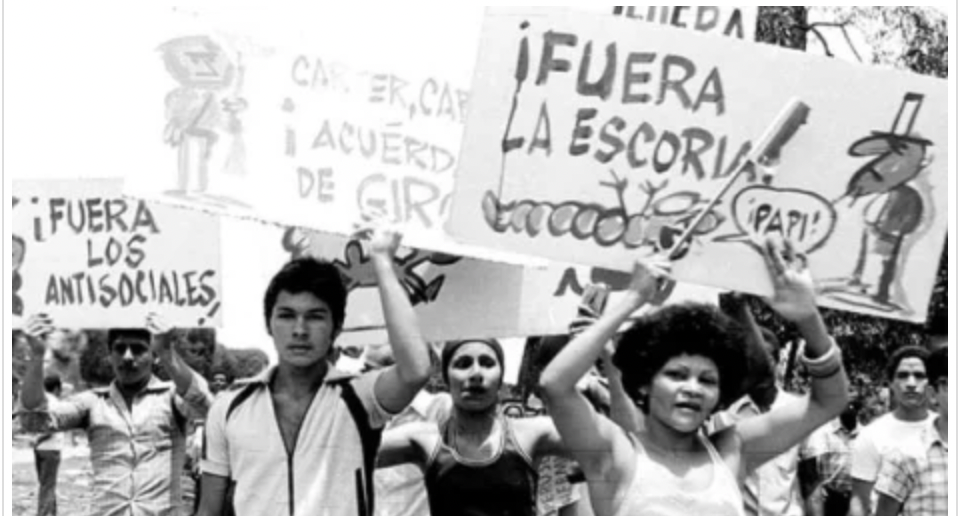
Supporters of the Cuban socialist government demonstrating against those seeking to leave the country during the Mariel boatlift, 1980.

In March and April 1980, groups of Cubans forced entry into the Peruvian and Venezuelan embassies in Havana seeking asylum. The government withdrew the guard from the Peruvian embassy and announced that any Cuban wishing to leave could do so without hindrance. Within days, more than 10,000 people had gathered on the embassy grounds. The government then opened the port of Mariel to vessels willing to collect emigrants.

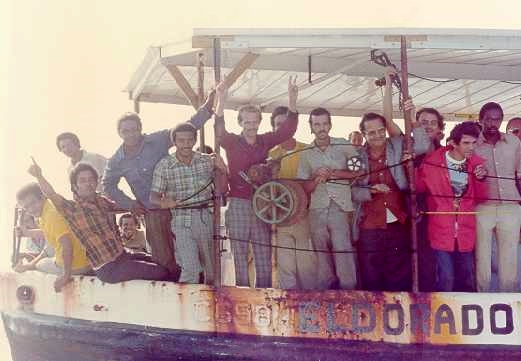
Cuban refugees arriving in Florida during the Mariel boatlift, 1980.

Between 15 April – 31 October 1980, approximately 125,000 Cubans crossed the Florida Strait in the Mariel boatlift. The marielitos came in far larger proportions from the working classes: between 15 and 40% were Afro-Cuban, compared with approximately 3% in previous waves. Many had grown up in post-1959 Cuba with no direct experience of the previous regime, and their decision to emigrate stemmed from frustration at limited social mobility and individual freedom rather than from the loss of a prior social position. The Cuban government deliberately included among the emigrants persons with criminal records and psychiatric patients. While precise figures remain subject to historiographical debate, as many as 20,000 arrivals had some form of criminal record; in many cases the relevant offenses were criminalized exclusively under Cuban law under provisions such as peligrosidad predelictiva ("pre-criminal dangerousness"), which penalized conduct including homosexuality and political dissidence.

Economist David Card published a landmark 1990 study on the impact of the boatlift on Miami's labor market—one of the most cited natural experiments in immigration economics—concluding that the sudden arrival of 125,000 workers did not significantly depress native workers' wages. The methodological debate generated by that study remains active in the academic literature.

=== The Special Period and emigration in the 1980s and 1990s ===
The collapse of the Soviet bloc between 1989 and 1991 had severe consequences for the Cuban economy, which had depended on Soviet subsidies and preferential trade. In 1990, the Cuban government proclaimed the Special Period in Time of Peace, the official designation for an economic crisis entailing sharp GDP contractions, food shortages, and the collapse of transportation and basic services. Between 1990 and July 1994, approximately 61,200 Cubans were admitted to the United States through regular channels, and some 13,600 more arrived in improvised watercraft. Clandestine maritime emigration—the balseros, who crossed the ninety miles of the Florida Strait on tire tubes, wooden rafts, and other improvised floating objects—intensified into a permanent, high-mortality flow.

=== The 1994 balsero crisis ===
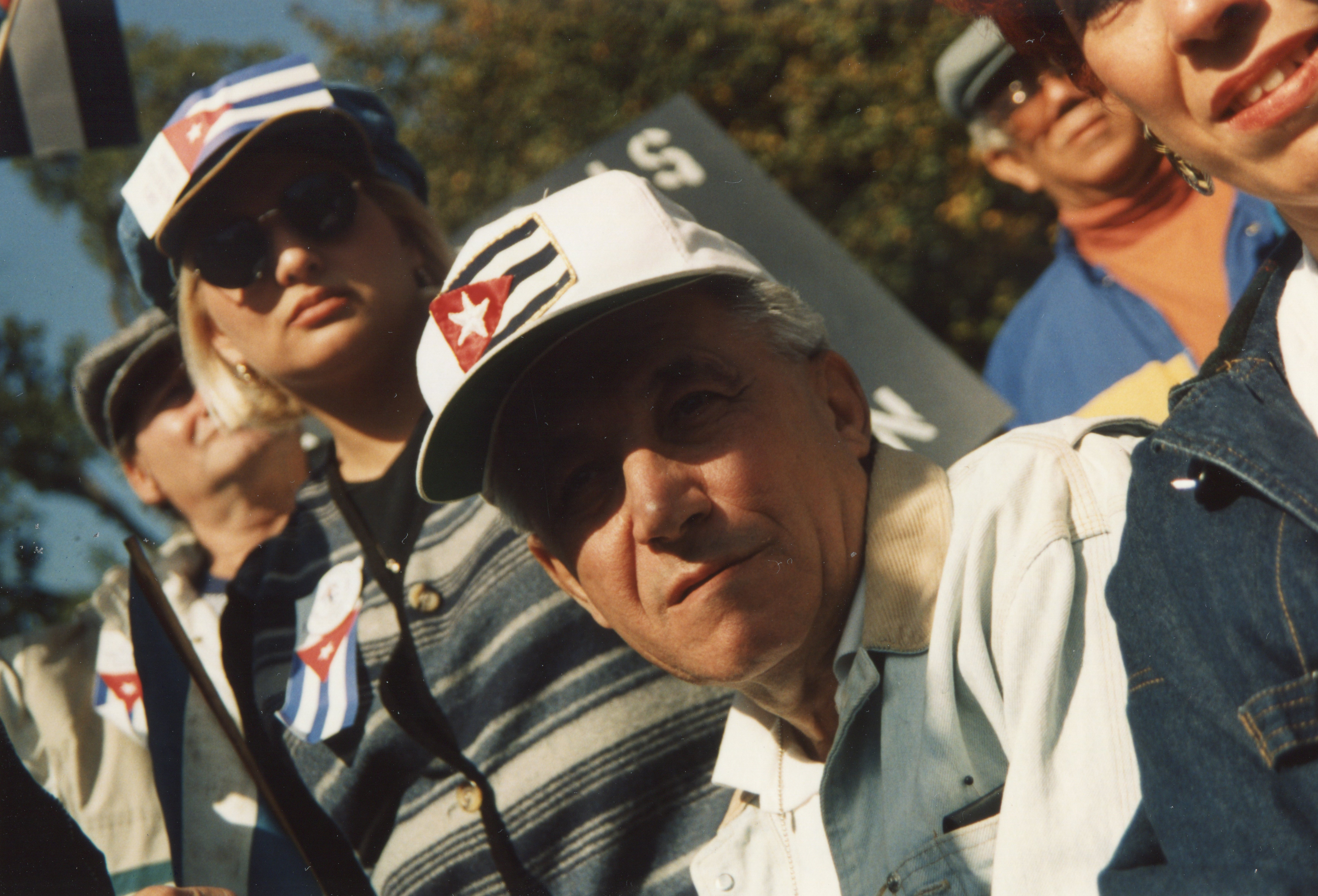
Cuban-American demonstrators in Washington, D.C., in October 1994, protesting against President Bill Clinton's policy of intercepting balseros and transferring them to Naval Station Guantanamo Bay rather than receiving them as refugees.

The summer of 1994 triggered the most severe migration crisis since Mariel. On 5 August, a crowd gathered on Havana's Malecón promenade in a spontaneous outburst of popular discontent—the Maleconazo—the most significant public anti-government protest in decades. On 13 August, Castro announced that the government would not prevent departures by sea. The 1994 Cuban rafter crisis consisted of the exodus of more than 35,000 Cubans over a five-week period beginning 13 August 1994.

The Clinton administration ordered on 19 August that rafters be intercepted and transferred to camps at Naval Station Guantanamo Bay and in Panama rather than admitted to the continental United States, thereby abandoning the unconditional reception policy that had been in effect until then. In September 1994 and May 1995, the two governments concluded agreements establishing a US commitment to grant a minimum of 20,000 annual visas to Cuban nationals, and the wet foot/dry foot policy: Cubans intercepted at sea would be returned, while those who managed to reach US soil could apply for residency. This policy, in effect until January 2017, generated incentives for increasingly risky crossing methods at a human cost that no official statistics could precisely document.

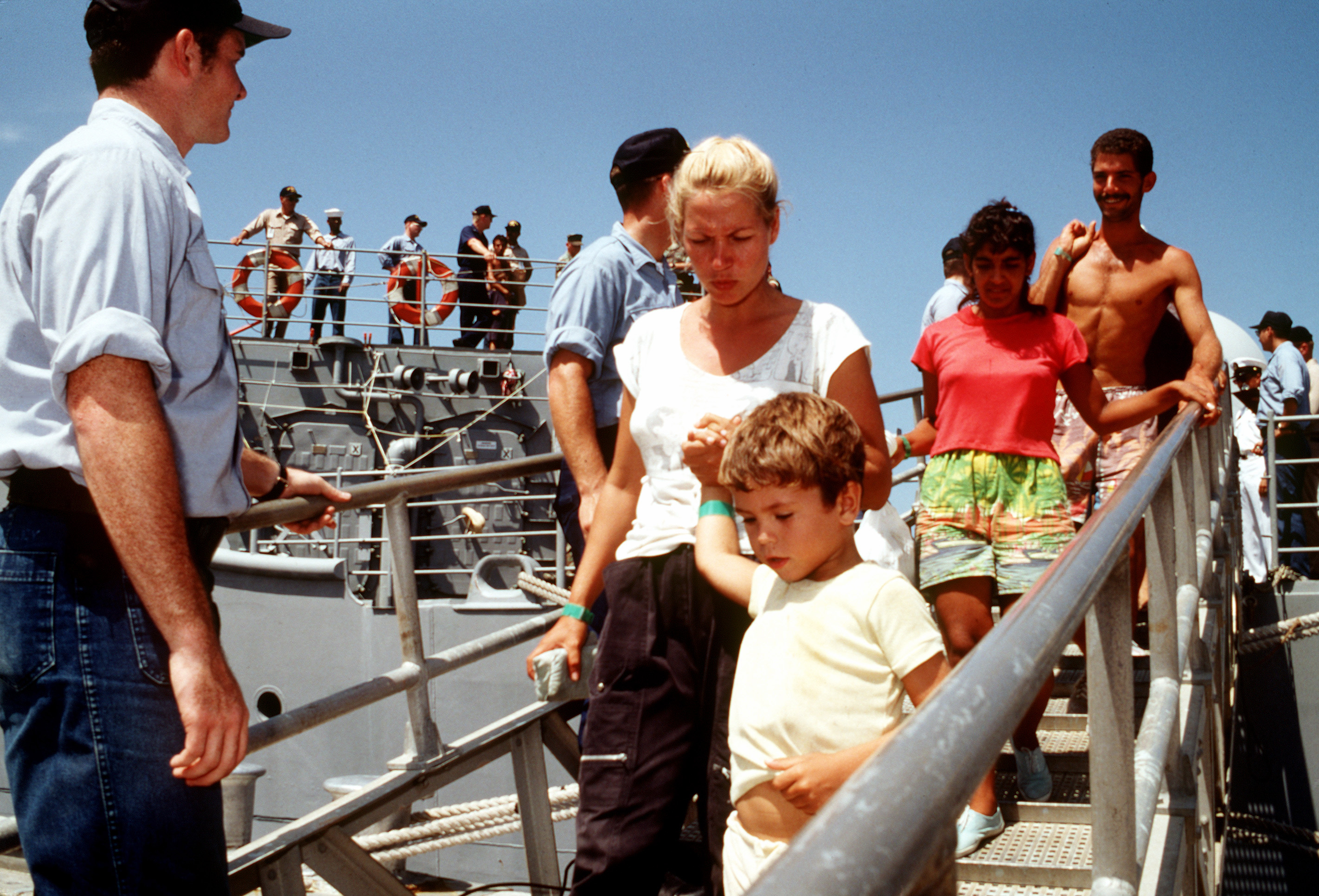
Cuban migrants disembarking from the USS Vicksburg at the U.S. Naval Base at Guantanamo Bay, 1994. They were among the first Cubans to arrive aboard a U.S. naval vessel during Operation Able Vigil.

=== Diaspora in the 1990s and 2000s ===
The period following the balsero crisis was one of sustained but non-mass emigration, channeled in part through the 1994 visa framework and in part through irregular overland migration via Central America and Mexico. The Cuban-American community completed a political transformation begun in the 1970s: from an initial refugee community with limited electoral participation to one with structural electoral weight in Florida, overwhelmingly conservative in orientation. The Cuban-American community was a decisive factor in the outcome of the 2000 presidential election in that state.

Through the 2000s, the composition and attitudes of the diaspora began to shift. More recent arrivals came in larger proportions from working-class backgrounds, were more racially diverse, and had lived their entire lives under the post-1959 regime. Tensions between the "historic exile"—with its emphasis on property restitution, the embargo, and non-negotiation with the regime—and younger generations more inclined toward family contact and remittances began to erode the political unanimity that had long characterized Miami's exile community.

=== Sustained emigration in the 2000s and 2010s ===
Through the 2000s and 2010s, Cuban emigration remained quantitatively significant, with overland routes through Central America and Mexico gaining in importance. One contributing factor was that Ecuador did not require a Cuban visa until 2015, allowing Cubans to fly there and begin the overland journey northward.

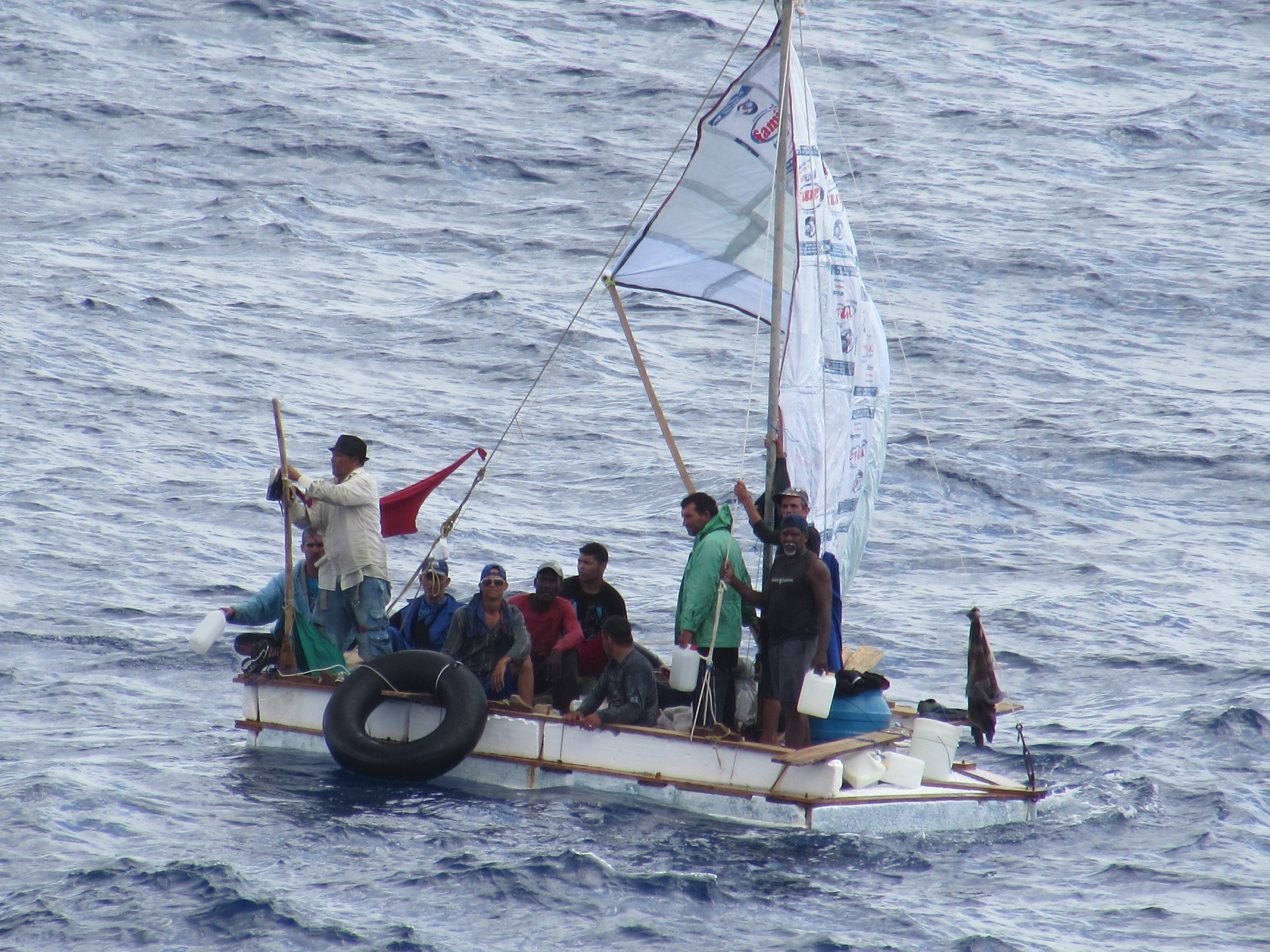
Cuban refugees rescued at sea by the cruise ship Carnival Liberty in August 2014. Improvised vessel crossings remained a common mode of escape decades after the 1980 Mariel boatlift.

Between 2014 and 2016, thousands of Cubans were stranded in Costa Rica after Nicaragua closed its border in November 2015. Most were eventually authorized to transit toward the Mexican border through a regional agreement among the governments of Costa Rica, El Salvador, Guatemala, Honduras, Belize, Mexico, and Panama, with logistical coordination by the International Organization for Migration (IOM).

President Obama's 17 December 2014, announcement of the normalization of diplomatic relations with Cuba had paradoxical effects on migration. In anticipation of the expected repeal of wet foot/dry foot—which occurred on 12 January 2017—flows accelerated sharply in 2015 and 2016. In fiscal year 2016, the United States recorded more than 56,000 Cuban arrivals, the highest figure since Mariel. The revocation of wet foot/dry foot in January 2017 meant that, for the first time since the 1960s, Cubans intercepted at sea or at the land border without documentation were processed under ordinary asylum law, without automatic access to permanent residency.

=== The 2021–2026 migration crisis: the largest exodus in Cuban history ===
==== Background and triggering factors ====
The migration process that intensified from 2021 onward is unprecedented in the history of Cuban emigration for its volume, speed, and demographic impact on the island. Its origins lie in the convergence of structural and circumstantial factors.

Economically, the COVID-19 pandemic compounded an economy already deteriorating since the mid-2010s, itself a product of Venezuela's economic collapse—which had been the island's principal supplier of subsidized oil—the tightening of US sanctions under the Trump administration from 2017, and the structural inability of the state economic model to finance imports through its own exports. Tourism collapsed with the pandemic. Shortages of food, medicine, and fuel reached levels not seen since the 1990s; power outages extending up to sixteen to twenty hours daily in some provinces became recurrent. Cuba's healthcare system showed marked deterioration during the pandemic due to shortages of drugs, basic supplies, equipment, and personnel.

Politically, the protests of July 11, 2021—known as 11J—marked an inflection point: the largest public demonstrations against the regime since the establishment of the one-party republic, with crowds taking to the streets across dozens of cities and towns under slogans including "Patria y Vida!", "¡Libertad!", and "¡Se acabó!". The government's response included internet blackouts, mass detentions, prison sentences of up to thirty years imposed on protesters who had committed no acts of violence, and the deployment of paramilitary groups. The repression of 11J, combined with continuing material deterioration, drove an emigration wave reaching segments of the population that had until then remained on the island.

==== Scale of the exodus and demographic impact ====
According to data from U.S. Customs and Border Protection (CBP) and the United States Department of Homeland Security, between October 2021 and mid-2024 more than 860,000 Cubans arrived in the United States, the majority via the land border with Mexico. December 2022 saw the peak of the exodus, with 44,064 Cuban arrivals in a single month—a figure equivalent to the entire total for 2012. In calendar year 2022 alone, 313,488 Cubans arrived in the United States, representing approximately 3% of Cuba's population for that year; this single-year total surpassed the cumulative figures of the Golden Exile (354,963 between 1959 and 1962), the Freedom Flights (333,457 between 1965 and 1973), and every preceding Cuban migration episode. Total emigration toward all destinations in 2022 reached 369,393.

The demographic impact was confirmed by Cuban authorities. During the July 2024 session of the National Assembly of People's Power, Juan Carlos Alfonso Fraga, deputy director of the National Office of Statistics and Information (ONEI), reported that Cuba's effective population had fallen to 10,055,968 inhabitants at the close of 2023—a decline of 10.1% from 2020, returning the country to demographic levels last recorded in the mid-1980s. According to ONEI figures, Cuba's population fell from 11,181,595 on 31 December 2021, to 10,055,968 at the close of 2023—a reduction of more than one million persons in two years. The emigration of 1,011,269 persons was identified as the primary driver of this decline, followed by 405,512 deaths against only 284,892 births during the same period. These estimates are based on the concept of "effective population", counting persons who accumulated at least 180 days of residence in Cuba during the preceding twelve months—a methodology adopted to more accurately reflect the impact of mass emigration since 2021.

The official figures have been subject to methodological scrutiny by independent researchers. Demographer Juan Carlos Albizu-Campos estimated, drawing on migration data, vital records, and demographic statistics, that Cuba's effective resident population may have fallen to approximately 8.62 million at the close of 2023—a reduction of close to 18% between 2022 and 2023. In a subsequent update, Albizu-Campos estimated the effective resident population may have fallen to around eight million inhabitants at end-2024, representing a cumulative decline of approximately 24% from 2020. ONEI reported an effective population of 9,748,007 as of 31 December 2024, a decline of 307,961 from the previous year at a rate of −30.6 per thousand inhabitants.

Of the more than one million persons who emigrated between 2022 and 2023, approximately 800,000 were aged 15 to 59—that is, of working age—compounding the impact on the island's economic structure and reducing the active labor force base. This pattern has been identified by ONEI and by independent demographic analyses as a key factor in the deterioration of Cuba's age structure. The emigration of women of reproductive age further depresses birth rates in a context of persistently sub-replacement fertility, below replacement level since the late 1970s. Albizu-Campos has noted that the magnitude of Cuba's population decline since 2020 is structurally comparable, in demographic terms, to processes historically associated with armed conflict, given the combination of mass emigration, low fertility, and accelerated ageing. Multiple independent demographic analyses concur that the combination of sustained emigration, low fertility, and rapid ageing constitutes a structural crisis with long-term effects on Cuba's economy and the sustainability of its social system.

==== The Central American route ====
The principal artery of the 2022–2023 exodus was the Central American route, made viable by Nicaragua's decision to waive the visa requirement for Cuban nationals on 22 November 2021. This allowed Cubans to fly directly to Managua and from there undertake the overland journey through Honduras, Guatemala, Mexico, and ultimately the US border. Between fiscal years 2022 and 2024, more than 514,000 Cubans crossed the Darién Gap jungle—the border passage between Colombia and Panama—and Mexican territory to reach the US southern border.

The CHNV (Cuba, Haiti, Nicaragua, Venezuela) humanitarian parole program, launched by the Biden administration in January 2023, permitted the legal entry of up to 30,000 persons per month from those four countries. By October 2024, more than 110,000 Cubans had used this channel. The Trump administration, upon taking office in January 2025, suspended the program, cancelled previously granted paroles, and announced accelerated deportation policies, reducing flows toward the United States and redirecting them toward other destinations.

==== Diversification of migration destinations ====
A distinctive feature of the post-2021 exodus is the diversification of destinations. Where the United States had for decades been the primary destination of Cuban emigration, the contemporary crisis has redistributed the diaspora across a range of countries without precedent in Cuban migration history.

===== Spain =====
Spain has become the second most important destination, favored by cultural and linguistic proximity, an already established Cuban community, and the application of the Democratic Memory Law of 2022, which permitted descendants of emigrants from the Spanish Civil War and the Franco era to apply for Spanish nationality. Given that tens of thousands of Cuban families have direct Spanish ancestry, many Cubans were able to avail themselves of this legislation to obtain EU passports. According to the Spanish National Statistics Institute (INE), as of 1 January 2023, 198,639 persons born in Cuba were residing in Spain. Cubans were the nationality that most benefited from the Democratic Memory Law: by end-2023 more than 226,000 applications had been submitted, with Havana as the leading consulate of origin. In 2023 at least 28,900 Cubans emigrated to Spain, and 33,900 in 2024, for an approximate two-year total of 62,800. The Cuban community resident in Spain exceeds 257,000 individuals by conservative estimates.

===== Brazil =====
Brazil has become a significant destination for Cuban migration in South America, particularly within recent flows of international protection applications and immigration regularization. According to data from the Observatory of International Migration (OBMigra), linked to Brazil's National Migration Registry System, the number of Cuban nationals with migration registration in Brazil increased from 28,374 during 2011–2020 to 103,427 during 2021–2025. Brazil recorded 68,159 asylum applications in 2024, of which 22,288 were from Cuban nationals, making them the second largest applicant group behind Venezuelans. UNHCR and media reports based on official data indicate that during certain months of 2025 Cubans led asylum application numbers in Brazil, surpassing Venezuelans, reflecting a shift in the composition of regional migratory flows. Most Cuban migrants enter through the northern border in the state of Roraima, from where a significant proportion relocate to southern and southeastern regions, particularly São Paulo.

===== Uruguay, Costa Rica, and Mexico =====
Uruguay recorded 7,413 Cuban asylum applications in 2024 and a further 1,700 in the first quarter of 2025. The IOM notes that Costa Rica has also become a significant settlement destination: a survey conducted among Cubans present in the country in January and February 2026 found that 94% intended to remain, citing institutional stability and access to international protection. Mexico remains statistically a transit country for most migrants, though a growing number have settled there; in 2024 it recorded 17,884 Cuban asylum applications.

===== The Balkans =====
The "Balkan route" was used by Cuban migrants primarily between 2021 and 2023 as part of irregular flows toward the European Union. Investigations coordinated by Europol and Interpol documented people-smuggling networks that exploited the visa-free regime then in effect between Cuba and Serbia to transport migrants by air to Belgrade, from where they continued their irregular transit through the Western Balkans toward EU member states. Criminal networks charged approximately €9,000 per person for the full journey, including transport, accommodation, and falsified documentation; an estimated 5,000 Cuban nationals were introduced irregularly into the EU through this corridor. Europol's analysis indicates that migrants flew from Cuba to Serbia and were subsequently transported by land through North Macedonia and Greece, with Spain as the primary final destination. In 2023, Serbia introduced visa restrictions for Cuban nationals as part of its progressive alignment with EU migration policy and in response to the use of its territory as a transit point toward the Schengen area.

== Culture ==
Cuban culture is the result of a historical process of transculturation—a term coined by ethnologist and sociologist Fernando Ortiz in his work Cuban Counterpoint: Tobacco and Sugar (1940)— in which European traditions, primarily Spanish in origin, the traditions of various sub-Saharan African ethnic groups, and the indigenous traditions of the Taíno and Ciboney peoples converged over the course of five centuries. This process, which unfolded under conditions of colonialism, slavery, and successive waves of migration, gave rise to a distinct cultural identity of universal reach, whose most visible expressions are music, dance, literature, architecture, the visual arts, and cuisine. Cuba has exerted an influence on twentieth-century international popular culture that is notable and disproportionate to its size, above all through music and film.

=== Historical roots and cultural composition ===
The indigenous presence in Cuba, primarily that of the Taíno and Ciboney peoples, underwent a near-total demographic collapse in the first decades of Spanish colonization in the sixteenth century. Their legacy, however, persists in the vocabulary—words such as tobacco, hurricane, maize, yuca, canoe, and hammock are of Arawakan origin— as well as in agriculture and cuisine. Spanish colonization, which began with the founding of Baracoa in 1511, laid the foundations of the Castilian language, ecclesiastical institutions, monumental architecture, and the literary forms that would shape the island's high culture for centuries.

The trade in enslaved Africans, which intensified from the seventeenth century onward and reached its height between the late eighteenth and mid-nineteenth centuries—when Cuba became the world's leading sugar producer— brought to the island populations from Yoruba (known in Cuba as Lucumí), Bantu (Kongo), Fon (Arará), and Efik–Ibibio (Abakuá) ethnic groups, whose religious, musical, linguistic, and culinary systems merged with European ones to produce the cultural forms most characteristic of Cuban identity. Transculturation operated under the structural violence of slavery, yet gave rise to one of the most complex cultural syntheses in the Americas.

Subsequent waves of migration added further layers: Canarian settlers, whose imprint on folk customs and rural tradition remains perceptible in rural areas; Haitian and Jamaican immigrants who arrived in the Oriente region from the late eighteenth century onward, bringing their own musical traditions; Chinese contract workers who arrived between 1847 and 1874, leaving a lasting mark on cuisine; and Catalan, Asturian, Galician, and Basque communities established primarily within the urban commercial bourgeoisie. All these elements accumulated unevenly according to region, social class, and historical period, producing the internal heterogeneity that characterizes Cuban culture.

==== Tobacco culture ====
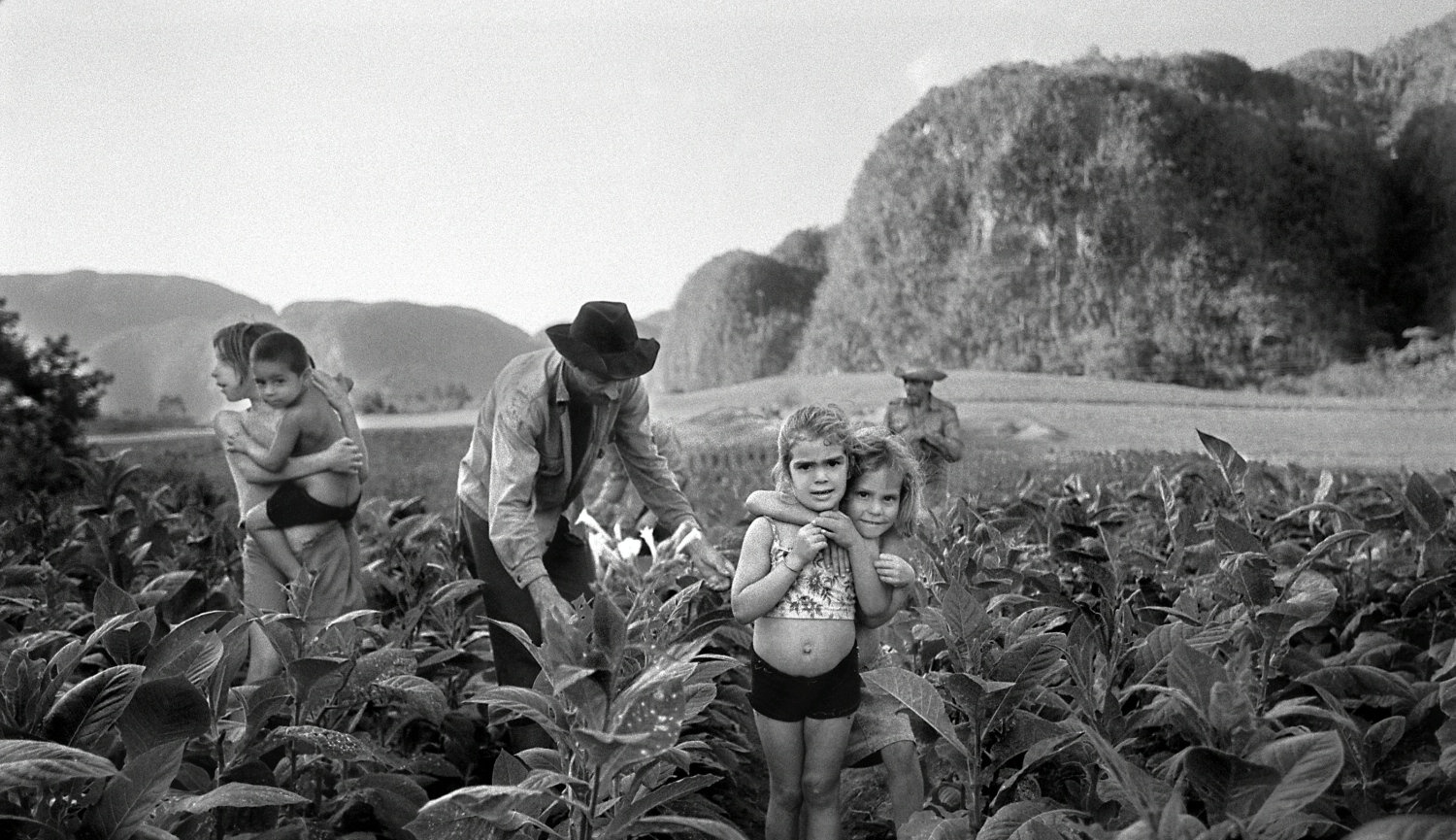
Harvesting tobacco leaves on a vega (tobacco plantation) in Vuelta Abajo, Pinar del Río.

Tobacco is one of the pillars of Cuban cultural identity and the agricultural product through which Cuba has acquired the greatest international renown. Cultivated and consumed by the Taíno before the arrival of Europeans, it was introduced to the European continent from Cuba by Spanish colonizers in the sixteenth century. The Vuelta Abajo region, in the present-day Pinar del Río Province, particularly the municipalities of San Juan y Martínez, San Luis, and the Viñales Valley, was identified as early as the seventeenth century as the area producing the finest Havana cigars in the world, owing to the singular composition of its red soil (tierra prieta) and its specific climatic conditions. The cultural landscape of the Viñales Valley was designated a World Heritage Site by UNESCO in 1999.

The vega—the tobacco plantation—and the figure of the veguero (tobacco grower) gave rise to a distinct peasant culture in western Cuba. The hand-rolling of the habano—the Cuban cigar—attained a singular level of artisanal refinement: the different components of the cigar (capa, capote, and tripa) require leaves with characteristics specific to each farm, and the craft of the torcedor (cigar roller) demands years of training and practice. Among the most prestigious historic brands are H. Upmann (founded 1844), Partagás (1845), Romeo y Julieta (1875), and Montecristo (1935), all of which consolidated their reputations during the Republic. The Cohiba brand was created in 1966 for use in Cuban state protocol.

In the cigar factories—the large hand-rolling workshops—there operated from the mid-nineteenth century onward a cultural institution with no documented equivalent in any other industry in the world: the factory reader. From 1865, when the practice was formalized with the support of labor leader Saturnino Martínez in Havana, the tobacco workers themselves paid out of their own pockets for a reader who, seated on an elevated platform at the center of the workshop, read aloud while they worked: newspapers, novels, plays, philosophical essays, and works of political theory. The practice contributed to the intellectual and political development of the tobacco-working class, to the spread of abolitionist and pro-independence ideas, and produced a working class of notably high cultural attainment. Cuba has put forward to UNESCO the nomination of this tradition for possible inscription on the Representative List of the Intangible Cultural Heritage of Humanity.

==== Music ====
Music is one of the most internationally influential expressions of Cuban culture. It showcases the blend of European and African traditions that characterizes Cuban culture.

The oldest documented musical forms on the island include peasant songs of Spanish origin – romances, glossed décimas, tonadas – which coexisted with the ritual drumming and chants of African slaves. From this Spanish peasant substratum emerged the punto guajiro, or punto cubano, a vocal form of poetic improvisation in eight-syllable décimas, whose practice survives through repentismo, the art of improvised, extemporaneous versification. The décima espinela is the quintessential stanzaic form of Cuban popular poetry.

The Cuban contradanza, derived from the French Contredanse and the Spanish contradanza, became distinctly Cuban in the late eighteenth century through the incorporation of African syncopation and the rhythmic cell known as the clave, thereby articulating the two principal axes of all subsequent Cuban music: melody of European origin and rhythm of African origin. The habanera, a genre that achieved enormous international popularity in the nineteenth century, developed from the contradanza; the composer Sebastián Yradier used the habanera pattern in "La paloma" (c. 1861), and Georges Bizet employed it in the celebrated aria from Carmen (1875).

The Danzón evolved from the Cuban contradanza and was created by the Matanzas-born composer Miguel Faílde, whose piece "Las alturas de Simpson" (1879) is regarded as the genre's first formally composed work. The danzón was adopted as the national dance in the late nineteenth century and remained popular among the urban middle and working classes well into the twentieth century, being especially cultivated in the recreational societies of Matanzas and Havana.

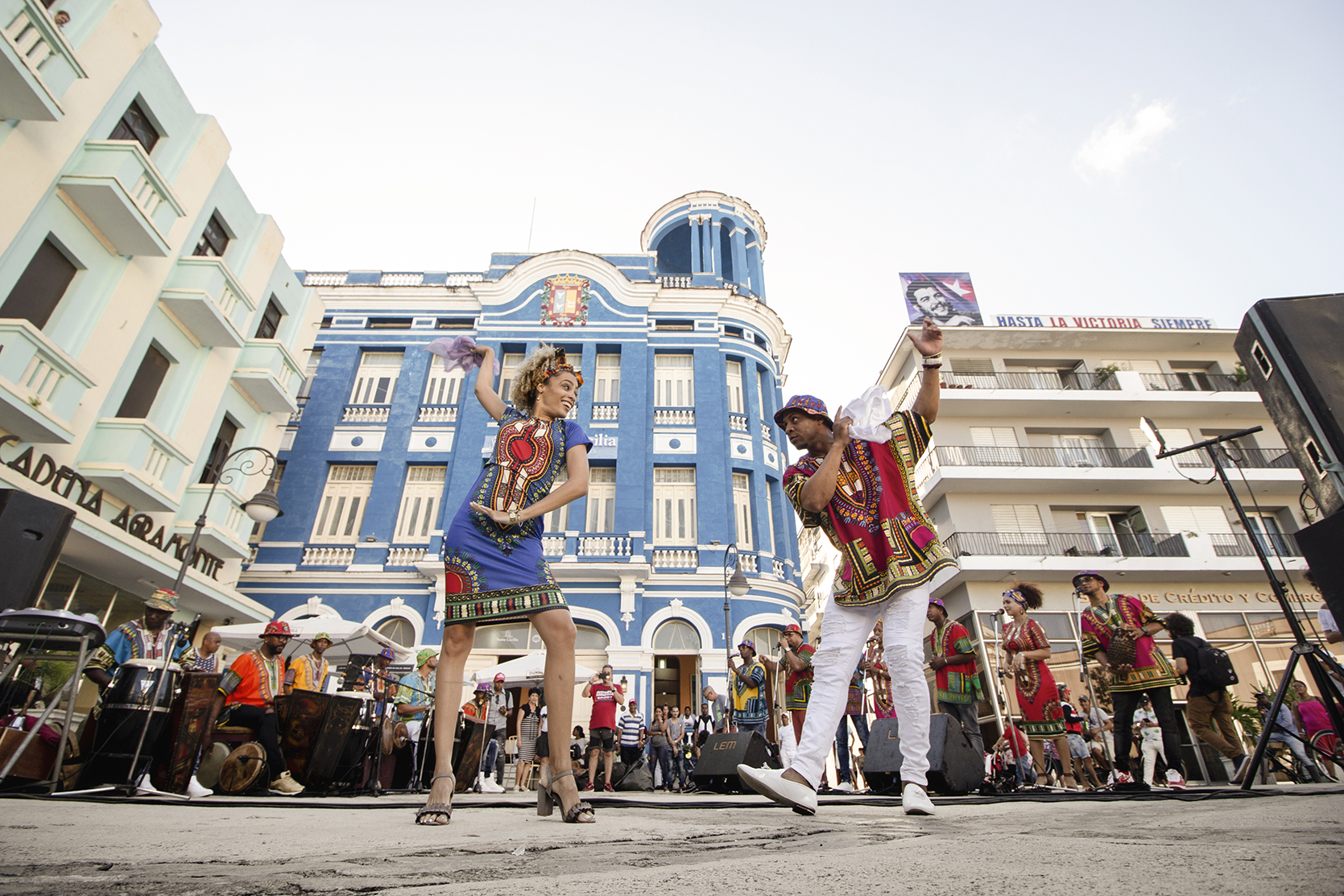
Dancers of Cuban rumba in the Plaza de los Trabajadores, Camagüey, Cuba.

Rumba emerged in the tenement courtyards (solares) and poor urban districts of Havana and Matanzas in the second half of the nineteenth century as a musical and choreographic expression of the working-class Afro-Cuban population. It should not be confused with Spanish flamenco rumba, nor with the ballroom dance styles bearing that name abroad. Cuban rumba comprises three modalities: Yambú, slow in tempo and solemn in character; columbia, danced solo by men with great acrobatic virtuosity; and Guaguancó, the most widespread form, narrative and expressive in character, danced by both men and women. Its principal instruments are the tumbadoras (congas), claves, and cajones (box drums). UNESCO inscribed rumba on the Representative List of the Intangible Cultural Heritage of Humanity in 2016.

Son cubano, which would go on to exert a decisive influence on twentieth-century popular music of African descent throughout the Americas, developed in eastern Cuba – chiefly in what are now the provinces of Santiago de Cuba and Guantánamo — in the late nineteenth century, out of the fusion of Spanish-derived trova singing with rhythmic percussion patterns of African origin, organized around the structure of the clave. Its original instruments include the tres — a three-course, six-string guitar with a distinctive timbre – along with maracas, the bongó, the güiro, claves, and guitar; the trumpet was incorporated in later stages. Son moved from the eastern provinces to Havana in the early decades of the twentieth century and was widely disseminated by the Sexteto Habanero (founded in 1920) and the Septeto Nacional Ignacio Piñeiro (founded in 1927), which made the genre's first successful recordings. The tres player and singer Francisco Repilado, "Compay Segundo," the composer Miguel Matamoros, and the sonero Nico Saquito are towering figures of classic son. Several subforms derived from the genre: Son montuno, guajiro-son, guaracha — festive and burlesque in character – and bolero-son.

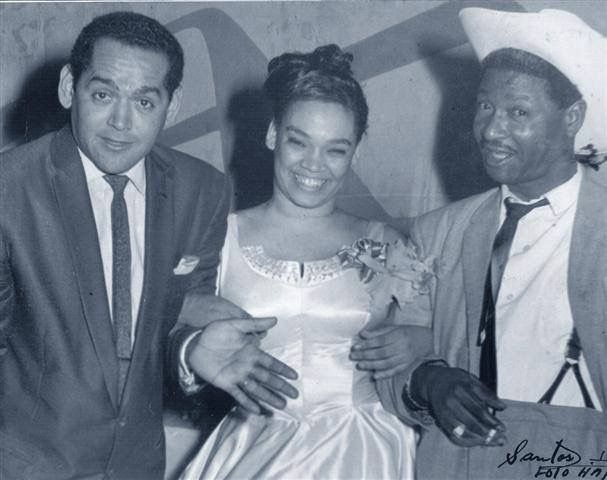
Pacho Alonso, La Lupe, and Beny Moré, three emblematic figures of twentieth-century Cuban popular music.

Cuban bolero, which emerged in Santiago de Cuba in the late nineteenth century as the sentimental branch of trova, differs from Spanish bolero in tempo, harmonic structure, and expression. Its creation is credited to the Santiago-born trovador Pepe Sánchez, author of "Tristezas" (c. 1885), considered the genre's first composition. It was cultivated within the tradition of trova by figures such as Sindo Garay, Alberto Villalón, and Manuel Corona, and in the twentieth century became the quintessential sentimental idiom of Spanish American popular music. Beny Moré, Elena Burke, Omara Portuondo, and Ibrahim Ferrer represent its highest interpretive expressions.

Afro-Cuban jazz arose from the convergence of Cuban rhythms with American jazz beginning in the 1920s. The percussionist Chano Pozo, who collaborated with Dizzy Gillespie in New York from 1947 onward, and the trumpeter and bandleader Mario Bauzá, co-founder of the orchestra Machito and His Afro-Cubans in 1940, were decisive figures in the emergence of Latin jazz, or cubop. In Cuba, the Orquesta Casino de la Playa, the Orquesta Riverside, and the pianist Bebo Valdés developed a jazz idiom of their own, later continued by Chucho Valdés and the ensemble Irakere (founded in 1973).

Mambo emerged in the late 1930s and reached its height between the 1940s and 1950s, arising from the convergence of son with the big band format. The genre's paternity is disputed: the bassist Orestes López and his brother Israel "Cachao" López are credited as the authors of the danzón "Mambo" (1938), considered its direct antecedent; Arsenio Rodríguez contributed fundamental rhythmic innovations; and the pianist and bandleader Dámaso Pérez Prado, a Cuban born in Matanzas who settled in Mexico in 1948, propelled it to international fame with his recordings of the 1940s and 1950s. The singer Beny Moré (1919–1963), regarded by much specialist criticism as the most accomplished Cuban musician of the twentieth century by virtue of his voice and exceptional stylistic versatility, was the foremost interpreter of mambo, son, and bolero in their most elaborate forms.

Cha-cha-chá was created around 1953 by the Havana-born violinist and bandleader Enrique Jorrín as a rhythmic simplification of the danzón-mambo, intended to make the dance easier to follow. Its name derives from the sound produced by dancers' feet performing the genre's characteristic offbeat step. It achieved immediate international popularity and became one of the most widely practiced ballroom dances in the Western world during the second half of the twentieth century; the Orquesta Aragón — founded in Cienfuegos in 1939 – was its most representative ensemble.

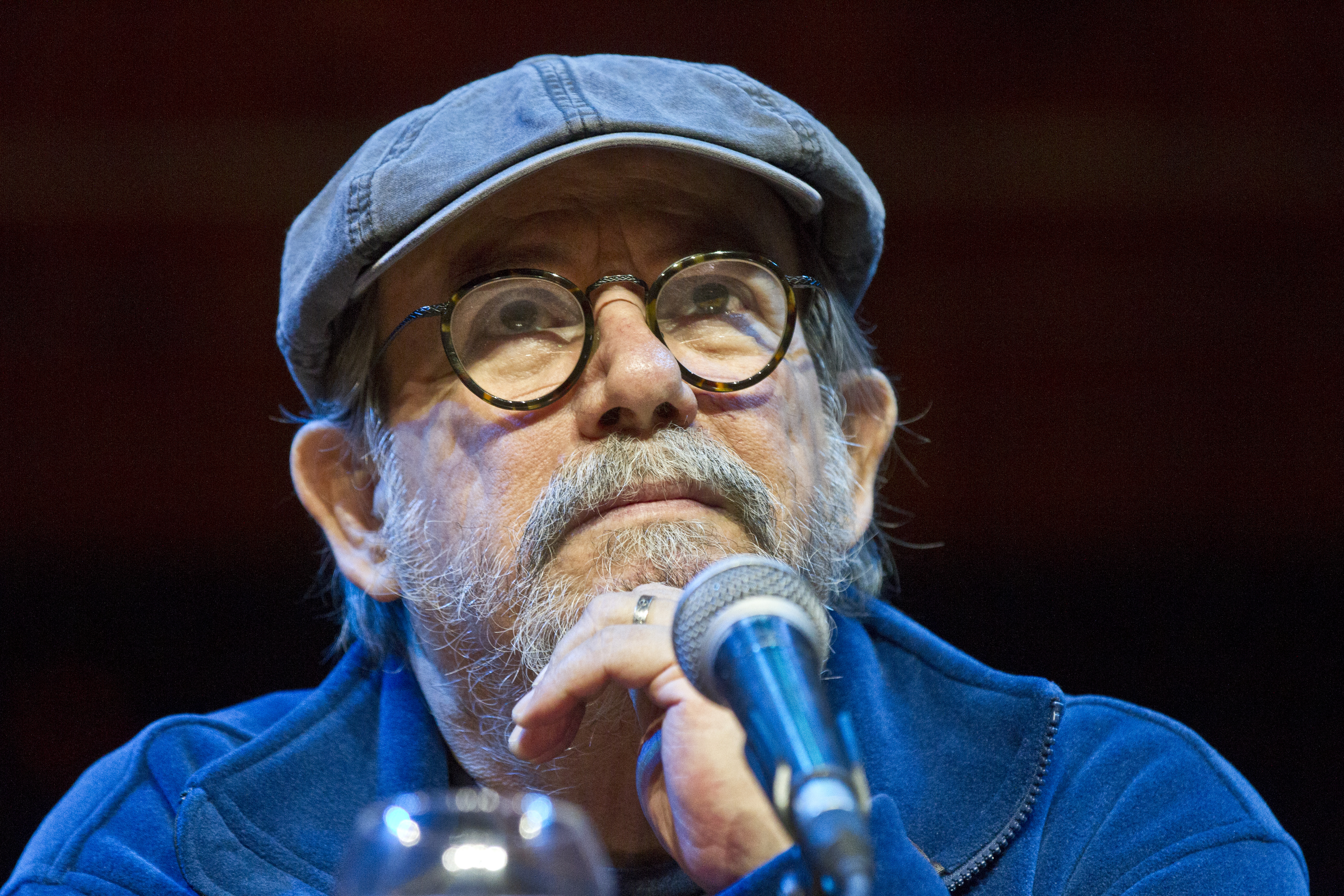
Silvio Rodríguez, singer-songwriter and co-founder of the nueva trova movement, one of the most influential voices in Spanish-language song-writing.

Nueva trova emerged in the late 1960s as a singer-songwriter movement linked to the revolutionary process, albeit with a complex relationship to state cultural institutions. Its principal figures, Silvio Rodríguez and Pablo Milanés, developed a style that combined the Cuban trova tradition with American folk music and French chanson, marked by texts of elaborate poetic construction. The Grupo de Experimentación Sonora del ICAIC, active between 1969 and 1978, served as the laboratory in which many of the movement's ideas took shape. Noel Nicola, Sara González, and, in later generations, Carlos Varela represent other strands of the movement.

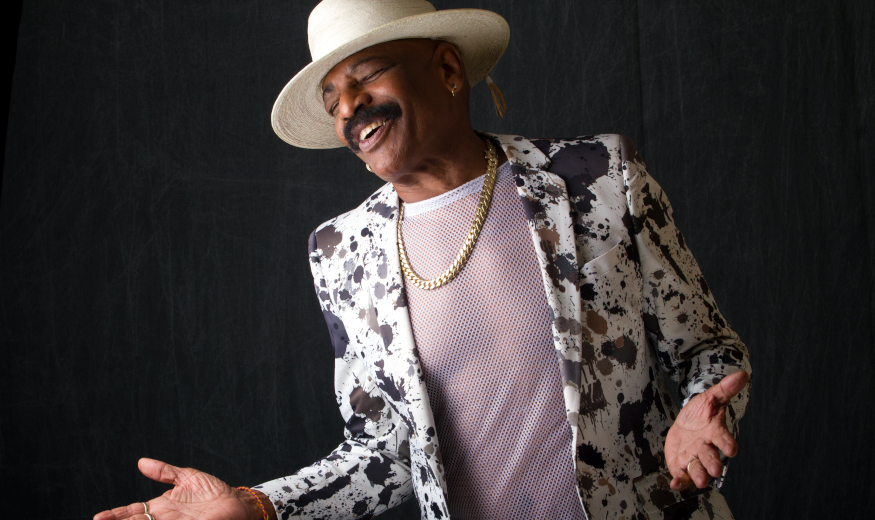
Pedrito Calvo, lead vocalist of Los Van Van for nearly thirty years and one of the most representative voices of Cuban timba.

Timba, developed in Havana from the late 1980s and consolidated during the 1990s, is the most influential contemporary expression of Cuban music. It combines son, rumba, jazz, funk, and the rhythmic patterns of the batá drums within structures of great rhythmic and harmonic complexity, performed by large ensembles. Los Van Van — founded by the bassist and composer Juan Formell in 1969 – and NG La Banda — founded by the flautist José Luis Cortés in 1988 – are its most representative groups, along with Issac Delgado, Bamboleo, and Charanga Habanera.

The Buena Vista Social Club project (recorded in 1996; released in 1997 by World Circuit/Nonesuch), coordinated by the American guitarist Ry Cooder together with producer Nick Gold, brought together a group of Cuban musicians from earlier generations – among them Compay Segundo, Ibrahim Ferrer, Rubén González, and Omara Portuondo – and produced an album of enormous international impact that renewed worldwide interest in classic Cuban son. The eponymous documentary directed by Wim Wenders (1999) further broadened its global reach.

==== Ballet ====
The antecedents of ballet in Cuba date to the 19th century, when the Teatro Tacón in Havana — officially inaugurated on 15 April 1838, and reputed in its day to be the largest and most lavish theater in the Americas, and the third in the world in technical and acoustic terms, after La Scala in Milan and the Vienna State Opera — regularly hosted touring European opera and ballet companies. The founding of the Sociedad Pro-Arte Musical on 2 December 1918, promoted by María Teresa García Montes de Giberga, created the institutional framework for the teaching and patronage of classical ballet on the island, attracting European-trained teachers and training the first generations of Cuban dancers.

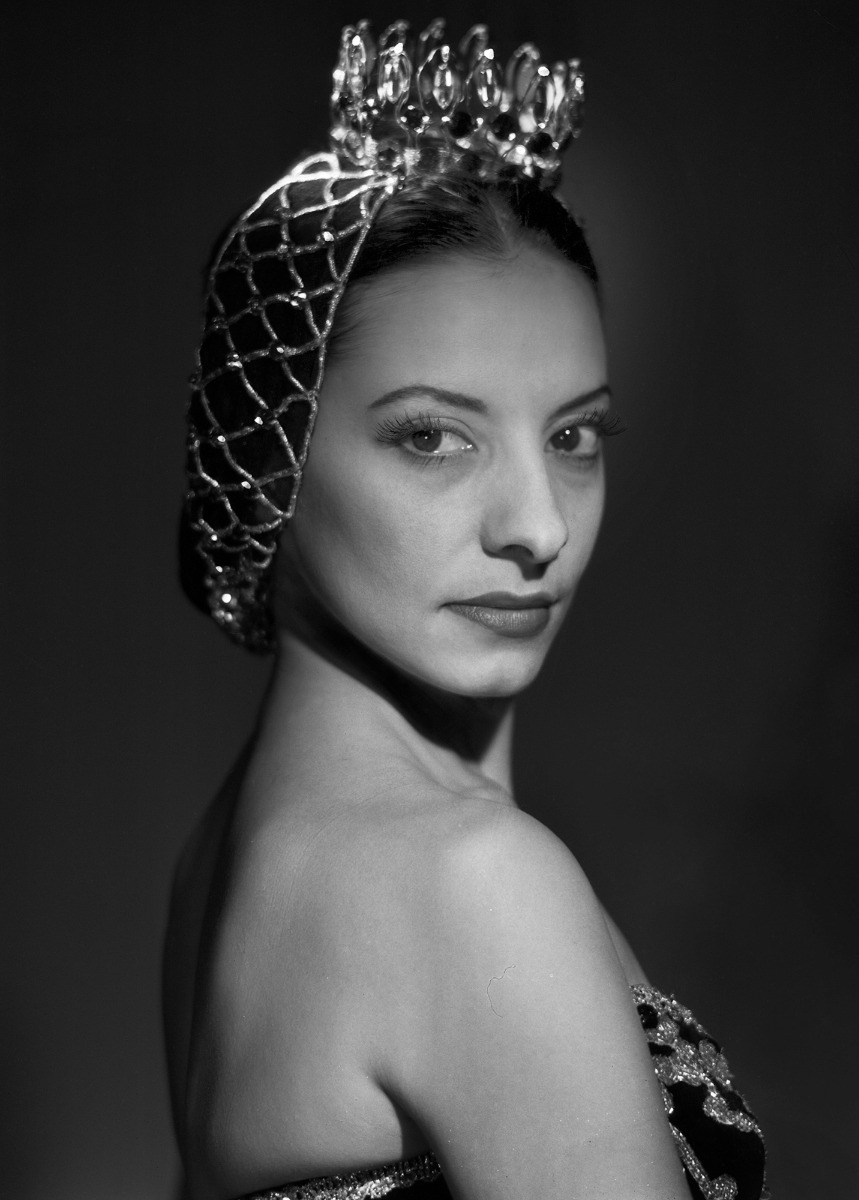
Alicia Alonso (1920–2019), Cuban prima ballerina assoluta and founder and director of the National Ballet of Cuba, in 1958.

The central figure of Cuban ballet is Alicia Alonso (1920–2019), a prima ballerina assoluta, choreographer, and teacher of international standing. Trained first in Havana and subsequently at the School of American Ballet in New York City, she joined American Ballet Theatre in 1940, where she danced the leading roles of the classical repertoire — Giselle in particular – despite progressively losing her sight from the late 1930s onward as a result of a bilateral retinal detachment. In October 1948 she founded, together with Fernando Alonso and Alberto Alonso, the Ballet Alicia Alonso — renamed Ballet de Cuba in 1955 and, after the Cuban Revolution, reorganized in 1959 under its definitive name, the National Ballet of Cuba. The company developed a technique of its own, known as the Cuban school of ballet, which combines the academic rigor of the Russian tradition with expressive elements particular to the Cuban dancer, and produced generations of internationally prominent artists. The National Ballet of Cuba received awards at festivals and competitions in Europe and the Soviet Union from the 1960s onward – taking part in the Varna International Ballet Competition for the first time in 1964 — and maintained a sustained international presence. Alonso continued to direct the company until her death on 17 October 2019, at the age of 98.

==== Literature ====
The oldest surviving text of literature produced in Cuba is the Espejo de paciencia (Mirror of Patience, 1608), an epic poem written in ottava rima by Silvestre de Balboa Troya y Quesada—born in the Canary Islands but resident on the island—recounting the kidnapping of Bishop Juan de las Cabezas Altamirano by the French privateer Gilberto Girón and his subsequent rescue. Rediscovered and published in 1838 by José Antonio Echeverría, the poem has been claimed as the symbolic starting point of Cuban letters, although Cuban literature as a distinct body of expression really began to take shape in the late colonial period, when a series of individual voices started to articulate a Creole consciousness distinct from the Spanish metropole.

The first major name in Cuban letters is the Romantic poet José María Heredia (1803–1839), whose odes "En el Teocali de Cholula" and "Niágara" place him among the precursors of Spanish-language Romanticism and among the first poets of continental renown. A contemporary of his, Gertrudis Gómez de Avellaneda (1814–1873), was born in Puerto Príncipe—present-day Camagüey—and pursued most of her career in Spain, but her novel Sab (1841) stands as one of the earliest abolitionist texts written in Spanish, addressing slavery in Cuba from a critical standpoint unusual for its time. Havana's slaveholding society found its most precise and enduring portrait in Cecilia Valdés (definitive edition, 1882), by Cirilo Villaverde (1812–1894), a central work of nineteenth-century Cuban costumbrist realism whose mixed-race protagonist became one of the most persistent symbols of national identity.

No figure, however, carries the weight in Cuban culture of José Martí (1853–1895), whose importance transcends literature to encompass politics, ethical thought, and the very formation of the nation. As a writer, Martí renewed Spanish American prose and poetry with works such as Ismaelillo (1882) and Versos sencillos (1891), along with an extensive body of essays of extraordinary stylistic density, placing him among the founders of Spanish-language Modernismo. His death in combat at Dos Ríos on 19 May 1895, during the Cuban War of Independence, cemented his status as an irreplaceable founding figure.

In the early decades of the twentieth century, the poetic movement known as Negrismo reclaimed African heritage and popular Afro-Cuban culture as central components of national identity. Its foremost exponent was Nicolás Guillén (1902–1989), who in collections such as Motivos de son (1930), Sóngoro cosongo (1931), and West Indies, Ltd. (1934) incorporated the rhythms of son and rumba, popular Afro-Cuban speech, and a critical stance toward colonialism and racism, becoming a leading figure in twentieth-century Spanish American poetry and National Poet of Cuba after the Cuban Revolution of 1959. Those same years saw the emergence of Alejo Carpentier (1904–1980), a novelist, musicologist, and essayist born in Havana to a French father and a Russian mother, who would become the most influential Cuban novelist in twentieth-century world literature. In the preface to his novel The Kingdom of This World (1949), set during the Haitian Revolution led by Toussaint Louverture, he formulated the concept of lo real maravilloso ("the marvelous real"), a direct precursor of the magical realism that later flourished in Spanish America; his novels The Lost Steps (1953), Explosion in a Cathedral (1962), and Reasons of State (1974) combine historical and musicological erudition with an extraordinarily dense Neobaroque prose style.

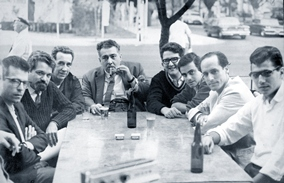
José Lezama Lima, Luis Rogelio Nogueras, Antón Arrufat, Pablo Armando Fernández, Mariano Rodríguez, Heberto Padilla, Sigifredo Álvarez Conesa, Roberto Fernández Retamar, and Víctor Casaus, young poets and writers, Havana, c. 1950.

The mid-century cultural renewal found its most radical figure in José Lezama Lima (1910–1976). A Havana-born poet, essayist, and novelist, Lezama founded and edited the literary magazine Orígenes (1944–1956), the principal hub of the Cuban cultural avant-garde of the period. His novel Paradiso (1966), with its labyrinthine structure and extremely dense neobaroque prose, ranks among the most ambitious and demanding works in Spanish-language literature. Close to him in sensibility but radically different in register, Virgilio Piñera (1912–1979)—primarily a playwright, though also a fiction writer and poet—represents the absurdist and existentialist strand of twentieth-century Cuban letters, producing a highly original body of work that endured periods of marginalization and official censorship during his lifetime.

The Revolution of 1959 produced a deep rupture in the Cuban literary field, dividing its principal voices between the island and exile. From London, where he settled permanently in 1966, Guillermo Cabrera Infante (1929–2005) published Three Trapped Tigers (Tres tristes tigres, 1967), a novel that reconstructs the nocturnal atmosphere of pre-revolutionary Havana through enormously inventive verbal play, indebted at once to James Joyce and to Havana colloquial speech. Reinaldo Arenas (1943–1990), persecuted by the state on account of his homosexuality and exiled from 1980, left behind a body of fiction of great intensity, the outstanding work being his autobiography Before Night Falls (Antes que anochezca), published posthumously in 1992 and adapted into a film in 2000.

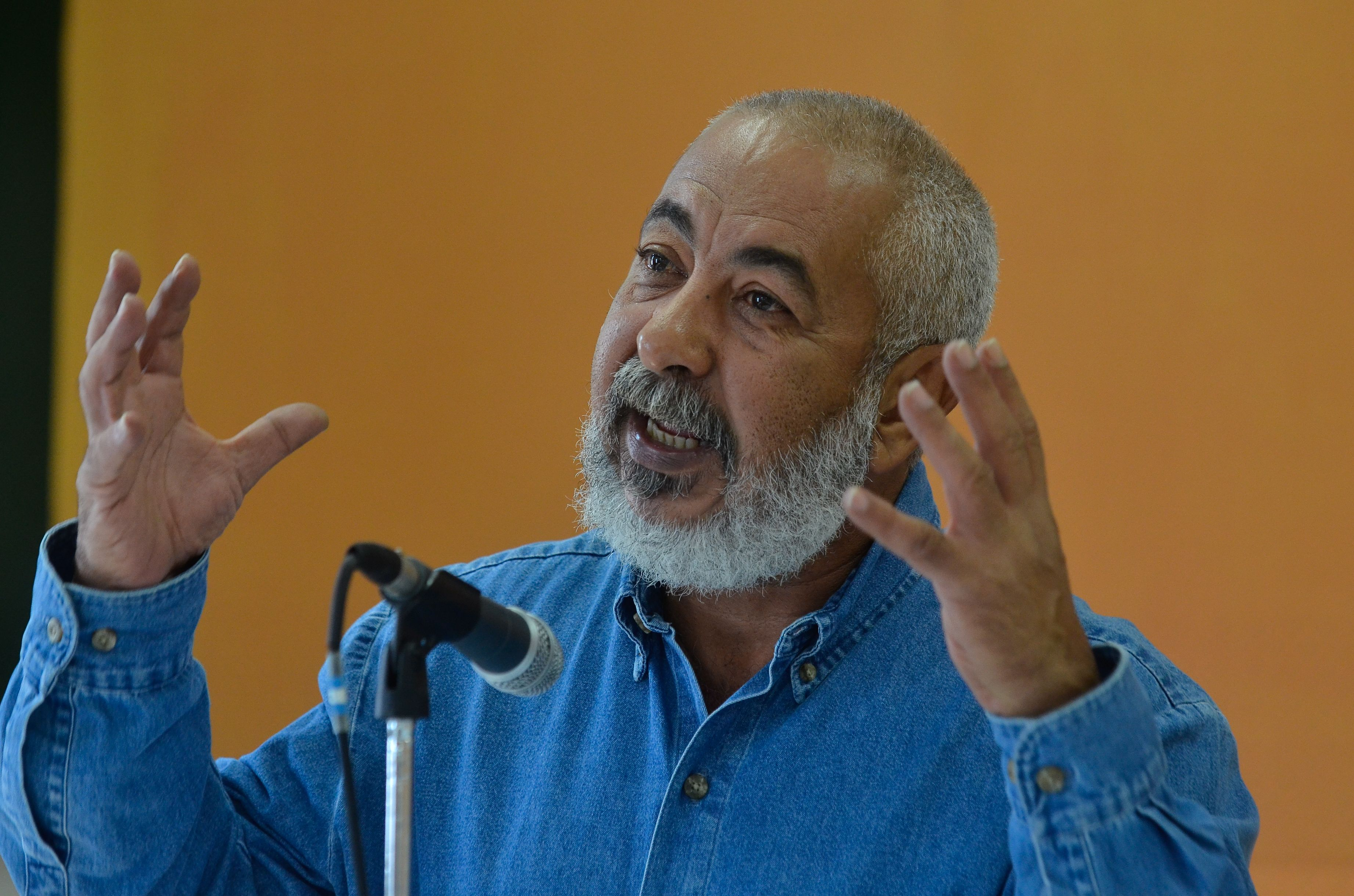
Leonardo Padura in 2015.

Contemporary Cuban literature finds its figure of greatest international reach in Leonardo Padura (b. 1955). Still resident in Cuba, Padura built, through his series of noir crime novels featuring the detective Mario Conde—among them Havana Red (Máscaras, 1997) and Havana Fever (La neblina del ayer, 2005)—a literary chronicle of Havana and of post-revolutionary Cuban society marked by notable critical depth. His novel The Man Who Loved Dogs (El hombre que amaba a los perros, 2009), which reconstructs the final years of Leon Trotsky and the figure of his assassin Ramón Mercader, won international acclaim. Padura received the National Prize for Literature of Cuba in 2012 and the Princess of Asturias Award for Literature in 2015.

==== Visual arts ====
Cuban visual art has its roots in the academic painting of the colonial period, cultivated at the San Alejandro National Academy of Fine Arts, founded in Havana on 12 January 1818, and generally regarded as the oldest continuously operating art school in Latin America. (Note: The Academia de San Carlos in Mexico City, founded in 1781, is chronologically earlier; it was closed, however, between 1821 and 1824, interrupting its teaching. San Alejandro has undergone no comparable interruption since its foundation.) Among the academic painters of the 19th and early 20th centuries who passed through its studios were Leopoldo Romañach and Armando García Menocal.

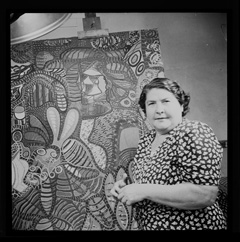
Amelia Peláez (1896–1968), a Cuban painter and a central figure of the island's artistic avant-garde.

The Cuban avant-garde emerged in the 1920s, when painters trained in Europe returned to the island with a renewed outlook. Amelia Peláez (1896–1968) developed an original pictorial idiom that fused Cubism and Fauvism with the decorative motifs of Havana's colonial architecture—leaded stained glass, wrought-iron grilles and polychrome azulejo tiles—in compositions of vivid color and pronounced geometric structure. Eduardo Abela (1889–1965) is remembered for his paintings of rural subjects and for creating the satirical character "El Bobo", which was widely reproduced in the press of the day.

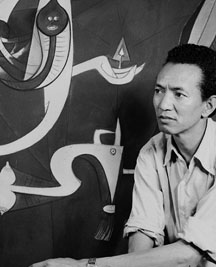
Wifredo Lam (1902–1982), whose work brought together European Surrealism and the iconography of Yoruba religion and Afro-Caribbean culture.

Wifredo Lam (1902–1982), born in Sagua la Grande to a father of Chinese descent and an Afro-Cuban mother, is the Cuban visual artist of greatest international standing of the 20th century. Trained in Madrid and formed within the Parisian Surrealist circle—with close ties to Pablo Picasso and André Breton—he developed a pictorial vocabulary that brought together European Surrealism and the iconography of Yoruba worship and Afro-Caribbean culture. His painting The Jungle (La jungla, 1942–1943) is part of the permanent collection of the Museum of Modern Art (MoMA) in New York. René Portocarrero (1912–1985) explored the iconography of Afro-Cuban religion and of colonial architecture with an exuberant palette and an expressionist lyricism of considerable intensity.

After the Cuban Revolution of 1959, the visual arts entered a period of ferment tied to the revolutionary cultural project, particularly evident in the political posters and graphic design of the Cuban Institute of Cinematographic Art and Industry (ICAIC), which between the 1960s and the 1980s produced a school of poster design that won wide international recognition. In January 1981 the group exhibition Volumen Uno, held at the Centro de Arte Internacional in Havana, (Note: The exhibition, which brought together eleven young artists, opened on 14 January 1981, at the newly established Centro de Arte Internacional on Calle San Rafael in Havana. The participants were Flavio Garciandía, José Bedia, Tomás Sánchez, Juan Francisco Elso, Gustavo Pérez Monzón, Leandro Soto, Rubén Torres Llorca, Rogelio López Marín, Ricardo Rodríguez Brey, Israel León and José Manuel Fors.) marked the emergence of a conceptually oriented generation of artists—among them José Bedia, Flavio Garciandía and Juan Francisco Elso—who opened a dialogue with international currents in contemporary art. The collective Los Carpinteros (active from 1991; the name adopted in 1994) (Note: The collective was founded in 1991 by Marco Antonio Castillo Valdés, Dagoberto Rodríguez Sánchez and Alexandre Arrechea while they were students at the Instituto Superior de Arte in Havana. In 1994 they took the name "Los Carpinteros" (The Carpenters) and formally renounced individual authorship in favor of a collective mode of production modeled on the craft guild. Arrechea left the group in 2003.) gained international prominence in the 1990s with work combining humor, social criticism and the handcrafted fabrication of objects and imaginary architectures. The painter Tomás Sánchez (born 1948) developed from the 1980s onward a hyperrealist idiom of marked spirituality in his renderings of the Cuban landscape.

==== Cinema ====
The cinematograph arrived in Cuba on 24 January 1897, when the French technician Gabriel Veyre, the Lumière brothers' representative in Latin America, gave the first public screening at a venue on Prado Street 126 in Havana, barely thirteen months after the Lumières' first exhibition in Paris. Four European short films were shown at that inaugural session. On 7 February of the same year, Veyre filmed Simulacro de incendio (literally "Fire Drill")—a one-minute piece featuring Havana firefighters—regarded as the first film shot on Cuban soil, although the original print has been lost. The first Cuban to work in film projection and cinematography was José E. Casasús.

During the early decades of the 20th century, Cuban film production was scarce and aimed at popular consumption, dominated by newsreel documentaries and homemade comedies. American cinema and, from the 1930s onward, Mexican cinema, dominated screens on the island. The domestic industry never developed a stable structure for production, distribution, or financing.

The direct forerunner of modern Cuban cinema is El mégano (1955)—the title refers to a rural charcoal-burning encampment—a roughly twenty-five-minute documentary short co-directed by Julio García Espinosa and Tomás Gutiérrez Alea, with the collaboration of Alfredo Guevara and José Massip, shot in the style of Italian neorealism among the charcoal workers of the Zapata Swamp, south of Havana. The film exposed the living conditions of that working community under the government of Fulgencio Batista. Screened only twice—at the Varona Amphitheater of the University of Havana and at the Retiro Odontológico—it was immediately seized by the Cuban Military Intelligence Service (SIM), and García Espinosa was arrested. The print remained in SIM's archives until 1959. Both for its critical intent and for the profile of its makers, El mégano is regarded as the most important precursor of the Cuban New Cinema and one of the founding works of the New Latin American Cinema movement.

The founding moment of modern Cuban cinema was the creation of the Cuban Institute of Cinematographic Art and Industry (ICAIC) on 24 March 1959, just weeks after the new government took power—reflecting the priority given to film as an instrument of cultural formation; the law establishing ICAIC was the first cultural measure enacted by the Cuban Revolution. Alfredo Guevara (1925–2013), a university classmate of Fidel Castro and one of the project's promoters, was appointed to head the institution, which he would lead, with one interruption, for roughly three decades. ICAIC's co-founders also included García Espinosa and Gutiérrez Alea, who had studied film direction at the Centro Sperimentale di Cinematografia in Rome in the early 1950s. ICAIC concentrated within its structure a monopoly over film production, distribution, and exhibition in Cuba.

A decisive episode in defining the limits of artistic autonomy in revolutionary Cuba was the banning of the short film PM (Pasado Meridiano, 1961), directed by Sabá Cabrera Infante and Orlando Jiménez Leal. The fourteen-minute film recorded, using the observational technique associated with the British Free Cinema movement, nightlife in the bars and taverns of the Havana waterfront. Although it had been broadcast on television without difficulty, ICAIC vetoed its release in theaters. The controversy sparked by the censorship led to a series of meetings between the revolutionary leadership and Cuban intellectuals, held in June 1961 at the José Martí National Library. Closing the meetings, Fidel Castro delivered the address known as "Words to the Intellectuals," which laid out the guiding principle of revolutionary cultural policy in the formula: "Within the Revolution, everything; outside the Revolution, nothing." This episode marked out the boundaries within which cinema—and the arts as a whole—would operate for the following decades, delimiting a space of relative creative freedom that permitted internal criticism but excluded dissent.

During the 1960s and 1970s, ICAIC produced films of notable artistic quality, recognized at European and Latin American festivals. Julio García Espinosa (1926–2016), one of ICAIC's founders and director of Las aventuras de Juan Quinquín (1967), contributed to international theoretical debate with the influential formulation of his manifesto Por un cine imperfecto ("For an Imperfect Cinema," written in 1969, published in the Peruvian journal Hablemos de cine in 1970). Against the technocratic aesthetic of Hollywood and of certain strands of European art cinema, García Espinosa called for an "engaged" cinema, made with whatever means were available, oriented toward the spectator's active participation and in the service of social transformation. The text became a fundamental reference point in Latin American film theory and within the broader context of what came to be called Third Cinema.

Tomás Gutiérrez Alea (1928–1996), known as "Titón," is Cuban cinema's most acclaimed director. His films Memories of Underdevelopment (Memorias del subdesarrollo, 1968)—an adaptation of the novel of the same name by Edmundo Desnoes—and Strawberry and Chocolate (Fresa y chocolate, 1993, co-directed with Juan Carlos Tabío) are counted among the essential films of Latin American cinema. The former examines, with critical distance, the alienation of the Havana bourgeoisie during the revolution's early years; the latter was the first work of official Cuban cinema to address discrimination on grounds of sexual orientation within the revolutionary system, and it received a nomination for the Academy Award for Best International Feature Film at the 67th Academy Awards (1995).

Humberto Solás (1941–2008) directed Lucía (1968), a film structured in three episodes set at different moments of Cuban history—1895, 1932, and the 1960s—which became a landmark of Latin American cinema and a reference point for feminist filmmaking. The documentarian Santiago Álvarez (1919–1998) renewed the language of documentary film with editing of great visual and political inventiveness, in works such as Now! (1965) and LBJ (1968). Manuel Octavio Gómez (1934–1988) directed La primera carga al machete (1969), an experimental reconstruction of the nineteenth-century wars of independence shot in black and white using handheld-camera technique.

Sara Gómez (1942–1974) was the first woman to direct films for the ICAIC and one of the institution's few filmmakers of African descent. Her documentary work addressed subjects including popular culture, racial prejudice, marginalization and changes associated with the Cuban Revolution. She later directed the feature film De cierta manera (1974), which combines documentary and fictional elements in its depiction of social change and conflicts between established attitudes and revolutionary ideals in a Havana neighborhood. Gómez died of an asthma attack before completing the films editing. The film was completed by Gutiérrez Alea and García Espinosa and released in 1977. Critics and scholars have discussed De cierta manera for its treatment of marginality, gender and race, and it has been examined within scholarship on Latin American feminist cinema.

A figure of a very different order is Nicolás Guillén Landrián (1938–2003), nephew of the poet Nicolás Guillén. His experimental documentaries of the 1960s—among them Coffea Arábiga (1968) and Taller de Línea y 18 (1971)—were marked by visual irony and disruptive editing that subverted the institutional commissions that had produced them. Subjected to repeated restrictions and to confinement in psychiatric institutions, where he underwent electroconvulsive therapy, he was permanently expelled from ICAIC in 1971. After years of increasing marginalization, he went into exile in Miami in 1989, where he died in 2003. His filmography, ignored and censored for decades, was rediscovered beginning in the 2000s and is now recognized as one of the most original bodies of work in Latin American documentary film.

The Noticiero ICAIC Latinoamericano, produced weekly between 1960 and 1990 under the artistic direction of Santiago Álvarez, served as a laboratory for audiovisual experimentation with no equivalent elsewhere in Latin American cinema of the period. The International Festival of New Latin American Cinema, founded in Havana in 1979 at the initiative of Alfredo Guevara, became the leading forum for Latin American and Caribbean cinema. In 1986, the International School of Film and Television (Escuela Internacional de Cine y Televisión, EICTV) was founded in San Antonio de los Baños, a film training institution that has since welcomed students from around the world, with an orientation toward the cinemas of the Global South.

Tension between cinema as art and as a political instrument surfaced with particular intensity in 1991, when the release of Alicia en el pueblo de Maravillas, by Daniel Díaz Torres—a satire of bureaucracy and ideological dogmatism—triggered a political backlash that led the government to attempt to dissolve ICAIC by merging it with the Film Studios of the Revolutionary Armed Forces and the Cuban Institute of Radio and Television. Organized resistance from filmmakers and the cultural community prevented the dissolution, although ICAIC's director, Julio García Espinosa, was replaced by the returning Alfredo Guevara. The episode coincided with the collapse of the Soviet Union and the onset of the so-called Special Period, an economic crisis with devastating consequences for film production: ICAIC's financial resources contracted sharply, its equipment deteriorated, and annual feature-film output fell to minimal levels.

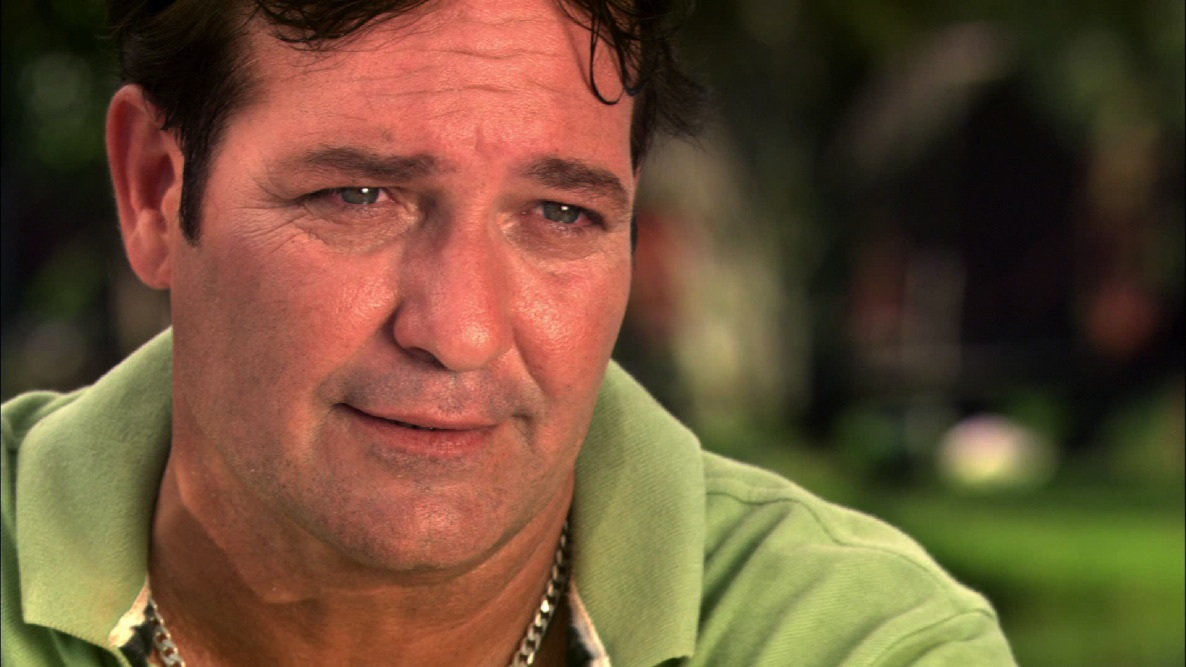
Jorge Perugorría, Cuban actor, who played the role of Diego in Strawberry and Chocolate (1993).

To sustain production, Cuban cinema increasingly turned to international co-production, chiefly with Spain and Latin America, supported by the Ibermedia program. This model yielded works of significance but also generated friction between the commercial interests of foreign partners and the authorial logic of Cuban filmmaking. Fresa y chocolate itself (1993), partly financed with international funds, was a paradigmatic product of this new production regime.

The filmmaker who has most consistently articulated a view of Cuba from within this context of crisis is Fernando Pérez Valdés (b. 1944), regarded by much of the critical establishment as the most important Cuban director of recent decades. His Special Period trilogy—Madagascar (1994), La vida es silbar (1998), and Suite Habana (2003)—constitutes the most sustained and stylistically ambitious cinematic treatment of the Cuban experience of the 1990s. Madagascar examines the deterioration of the relationship between a mother and her daughter against the backdrop of the crisis; La vida es silbar ("Life Is to Whistle"), more lyrical and dreamlike in register, won the Coral Award for best direction at the Havana Film Festival and was recognized at the Sundance Film Festival and the Berlin International Film Festival; Suite Habana, a dialogue-free documentary following thirteen residents of the capital over the course of a day, is considered by ICAIC itself the best Cuban documentary made since the institution's founding.

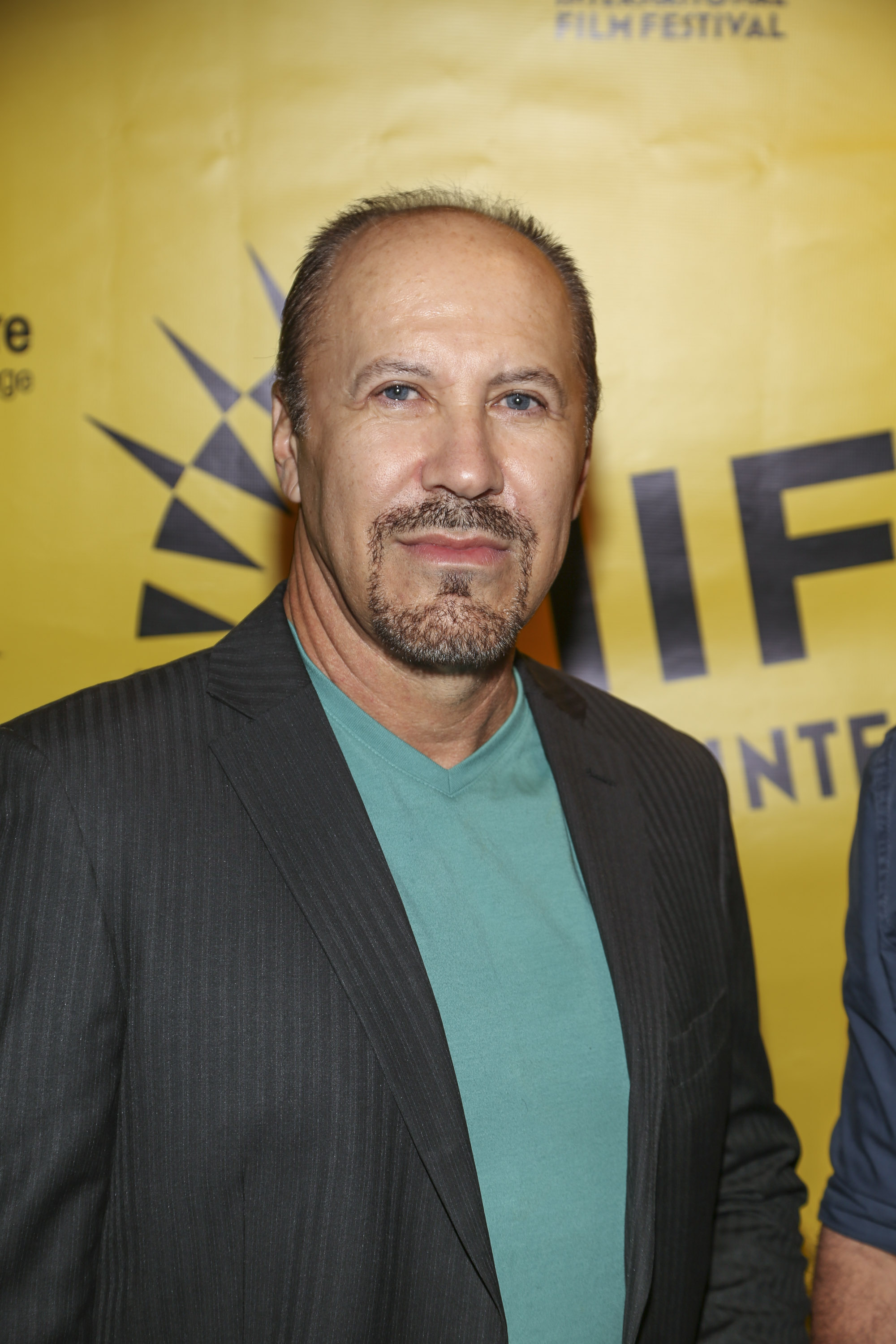
Cuban actor Héctor Noas, who appeared in Conducta ("Behavior," 2014), directed by Ernesto Daranas.

Twenty-first-century Cuban cinema has been marked by the emergence of filmmakers working outside or at the margins of ICAIC, the adoption of smaller formats and reduced budgets made possible by digital technology, and the growing presence of themes of emigration, marginality, and identity amid accelerating social change. Juan de los muertos ("Juan of the Dead," 2011), by Alejandro Brugués, the first Cuban horror film, laced with elements of political satire and shot as a Spanish–Cuban co-production, won the Goya Award for Best Ibero-American Film at the 27th Goya Awards (2013) and renewed international attention for Cuban cinema. Ernesto Daranas, with Conducta ("Behavior," 2014), addressed the contradictions of the Cuban educational system in a register of social realism that received wide national and international recognition.

The demand for a dedicated legal framework—a Film Law that would recognize independent production—has been a source of tension between Cuban filmmakers and the cultural administration since the mid-2000s, without such a law ever having been enacted. Emigration has deprived island cinema of a significant number of filmmakers: exile has once again become, as it did for the generation of Nicolás Guillén Landrián, the path taken by many artists who found no conditions in Cuba to develop their work.

==== Sport ====
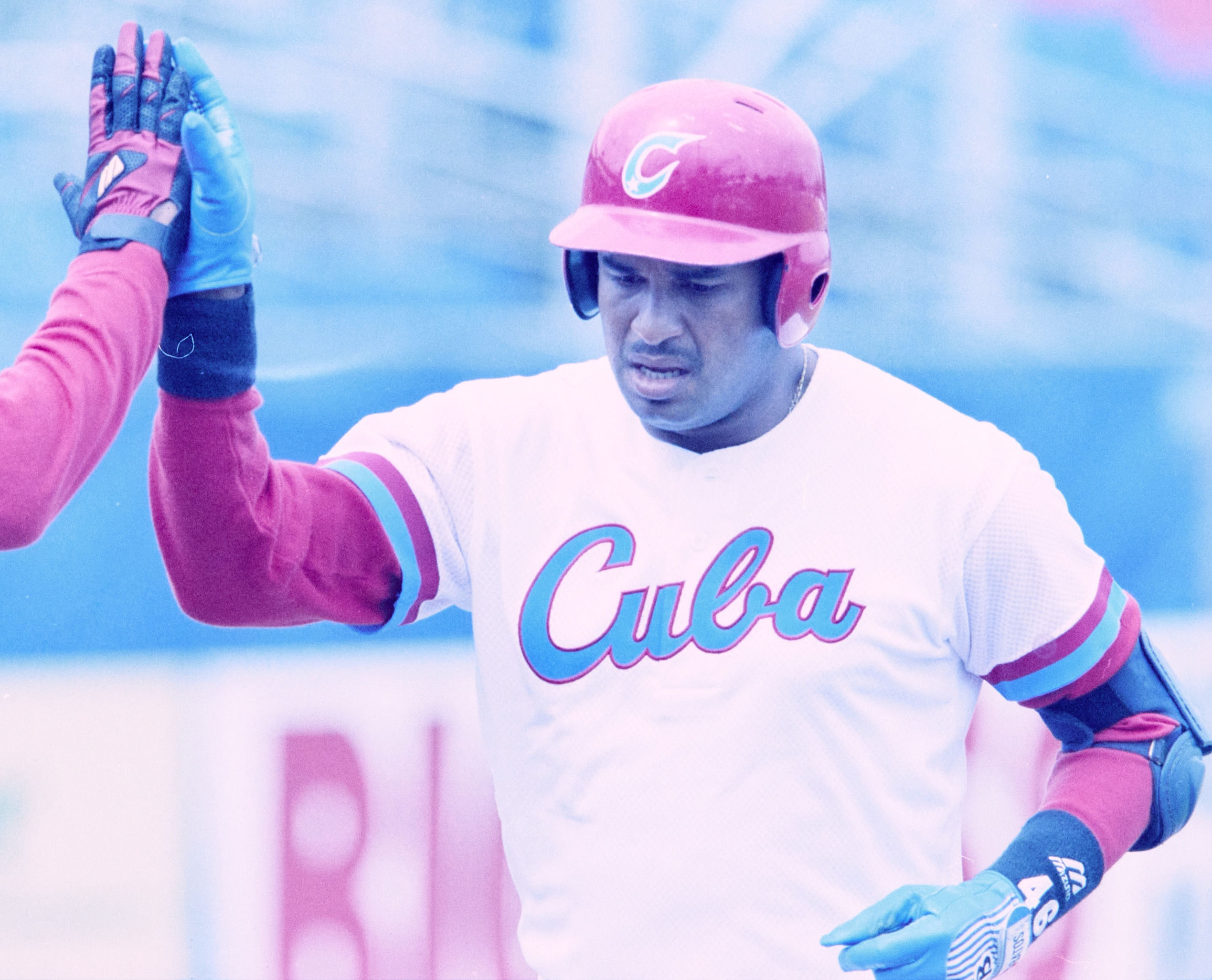
Orestes Kindelán, the Cuban ballplayer who is the all-time home run leader of the National Series with 487.

Baseball is the national sport of Cuba. Introduced to the island in the late 1860s by Cubans who had studied in the United States, it took root so deeply that the Cuban League, founded in 1878, is one of the oldest competitions of its kind anywhere in the world. After 1959 Cuba built a high-performance sports system within a framework of official amateurism, which produced successive generations of first-rate players. The national team won Olympic gold medals at Barcelona (1992), Atlanta (1996) and Athens (2004). Players such as third baseman Omar Linares, center fielder Víctor Mesa, outfielder Orestes Kindelán and the pitchers Liván Hernández and Orlando "El Duque" Hernández — half-brothers who later had successful careers in Major League Baseball — are benchmarks of Cuban baseball at its highest level.

Cuban boxing came to dominate the international amateur circuit. Teófilo Stevenson (1952–2012) won the Olympic heavyweight title at Munich (1972), Montreal (1976) and Moscow (1980), and is regarded by many specialists as the greatest amateur boxer of all time. Félix Savón (b. 1967) repeated the feat in the same division at Barcelona (1992), Atlanta (1996) and Sydney (2000). In the professional ranks, Kid Chocolate (Eligio Sardiñas, 1910–1988) became world junior lightweight champion in 1931, the first Cuban boxer to reach that level in the international professional game. Women's volleyball, athletics and fencing have also been high-performance disciplines in Cuban Olympic sport, reaching finals and podiums at the Games of the 1970s, 1980s and 1990s.

===== Chess =====
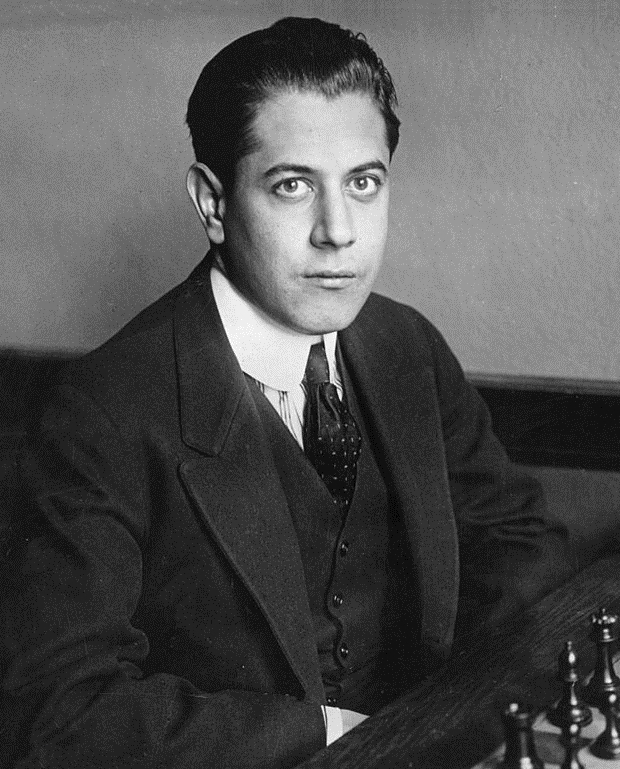
José Raúl Capablanca in his youth, before winning the world title in 1921.

Cuba has a solid chess tradition whose founding figure is José Raúl Capablanca, world champion from 1921 to 1927 and, to date, the only Latin American to have held the undisputed world title. The Capablanca Memorial, held in his honour since 1962, is one of the most prestigious international tournaments in the region. Although its pool of registered players is far smaller than those of other Latin American countries — some 3,500 registered with the International Chess Federation (FIDE), against more than 14,000 in Argentina and close to 27,000 in Brazil — Cuba has, according to FIDE figures, the largest number of active grandmasters in Latin America (26, compared with 23 in Argentina and 15 in Brazil). This lead has held despite the departure of several of its leading figures to other federations, among them Leinier Domínguez — winner of the World Blitz Championship in 2008 and a team silver medallist with the United States at the 2024 Budapest Olympiad — and Lázaro Bruzón — world junior champion in 2000 — both of whom were trained entirely within the Cuban sports system before settling in the United States. Individually, Cuban players have won eight medals across the history of the Chess Olympiads, beginning with the gold taken by Capablanca himself in 1939.

==== Cuisine ====
Cuban cuisine is the product of a convergence of Spanish, African, Chinese and indigenous traditions. It is marked by simple cooking techniques — frying, braising and slow stewing — by the prominence of animal protein and tropical tubers, and by sofrito, the slow frying of garlic, onion, pepper and tomato, which serves as the aromatic base of most preparations. Seasoning is moderate and the spices used are seldom hot; olive oil has coexisted with lard as a cooking fat since the colonial period.

Ropa vieja — shredded beef cooked in tomato sauce with pepper and garlic — is one of the most emblematic dishes of Cuban cooking. Black beans, eaten either as a potaje or as an accompaniment to rice, are a fundamental element both nutritionally and symbolically, and are of African as much as Spanish inheritance. Moros y cristianos — white rice and black beans cooked together — and eastern congrí — rice cooked with red beans, characteristic of Oriente — are ubiquitous side dishes on the Cuban table. Lechón asado — a whole pig roasted over coals or in a caja china roasting box — is the festive preparation par excellence, above all at Christmas Eve celebrations.

Yuca con mojo — boiled cassava dressed with garlic fried in oil and bitter orange juice — together with the tostón — slices of green plantain, flattened and fried — mariquitas, or thin plantain crisps, fried ripe plantain, malanga and boniato, round out the repertoire of the most characteristic vegetable accompaniments. Known collectively as viandas, these starches are treated as an indispensable component of an adequate meal, alongside rice, beans and a protein. All of these ingredients have Indigenous American or African roots and came to be fully absorbed into the popular diet.

Fernando Ortiz Fernández raised the ajiaco — a stew of assorted tubers with various meats — to the status of a symbol of Cuban cultural synthesis, using it as a metaphor for transculturation: just as the stew fuses ingredients of disparate origin into a new and indivisible whole, so, on his account, did the formation of Cuban identity proceed.

Cuban coffee, made from dark-roasted beans and served in small, highly concentrated measures — the cortadito in the cities, café cerrero in the countryside — is a social ritual of the first importance in daily life. Cuban rum, obtained by distilling sugarcane products and ageing the spirit in oak barrels, won worldwide renown through brands such as Bacardi — founded in Santiago de Cuba in 1862 by Facundo Bacardí Massó and displaced from Cuba after 1959 — and Havana Club — founded in 1934 and today state-run, with international distribution through Pernod Ricard. The classic cocktails associated with Havana, the mojito and the daiquiri, were popularised by the city's twentieth-century bar culture and are linked respectively to La Bodeguita del Medio and El Floridita, establishments whose international profile was boosted by the presence and the writings of Ernest Hemingway during his long residence in Cuba (1939–1960).

== Religion ==
Religion in Cuba (2010)
1. Catholicism (60.0%)
2. Protestantism and other Christians (5.00%)
3. Others/African Religious (11.0%)
4. Non-religious (24.0%)

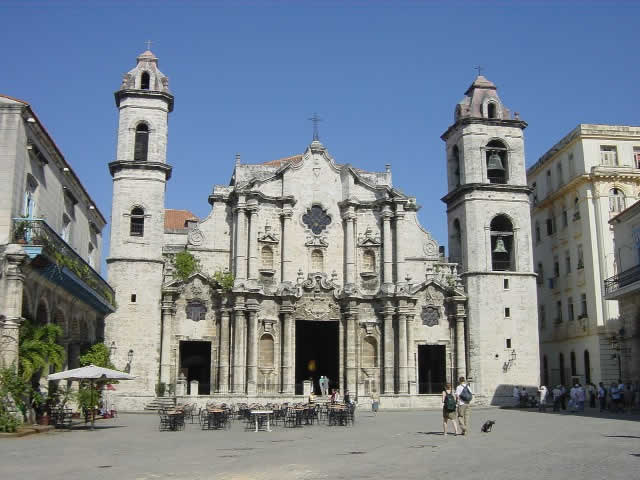
The Havana Cathedral

Cuba's prevailing religion is Roman Catholicism, although in some instances it is profoundly modified and influenced through syncretism. A common syncretic religion is Santería, which combined the Yoruba religion of the African slaves with some Catholicism; it shows similarities to Brazilian Umbanda and has been receiving a degree of official support.

The Roman Catholic Church estimates that 60 percent of the population is Catholic, with 10 percent attending mass regularly, while independent sources estimate that as few 1.5 percent of Catholics do so.

Membership in Protestant churches is estimated to be five percent and includes Baptists, Pentecostals, Seventh-day Adventists, Presbyterians, Episcopal Church of Cuba|Episcopalians, Methodists, Religious Society of Friends (Quakers), and Lutherans. Other groups include the Greek Orthodox Church, the Russian Orthodox Church, Jehovah's Witnesses, Hindus, Muslims, Buddhists, Jews, Baháʼís, and the Church of Jesus Christ of Latter-day Saints.

Cuba is home to a variety of syncretic religions of largely African cultural origin. According to a US State Department report, some sources estimate that as much as 80 percent of the population consults with practitioners of religions with West African roots, such as Santeria or Yoruba. Santería developed out of the traditions of the Yoruba, one of the African peoples who were imported to Cuba during the 16th through 19th centuries to work on the sugar plantations. Santería blends elements of Christianity and West African beliefs and as such made it possible for the slaves to retain their traditional beliefs while appearing to practice Catholicism. La Virgen de la Caridad del Cobre (Our Lady of Charity) is the Catholic patroness of Cuba, and is greatly revered by the Cuban people and seen as a symbol of Cuba. In Santería, she has been syncretized with the goddess Ochún. The important religious festival "La Virgen de la Caridad del Cobre" is celebrated by Cubans annually on 8 September. Other religions practised are Palo Monte, and Abakuá, which have large parts of their liturgy in African languages.

=== Symbols ===
The flag of Cuba is red, white, and blue; and was first adopted by Narciso López on a suggestion by the poet Miguel Teurbe Tolón. The design incorporates three blue stripes, representing the three provinces of the time (Oriente, Centro, and Occidente), and two white stripes symbolizing the purity of the patriotic cause. The red triangle stands for the blood shed to free the nation. The white star in the triangle stands for independence.

Coat of arms of Cuba

== See also ==
- Afro-Hispanic
- Caribbean people
- Criollo people
- Cuba-United States relations
- Cuban Americans
- Cuban cuisine
- Cuban exile
- Cuban immigration to the United States
- Cuban Mexicans
- Cuban migration to Miami
- Cuban migration to Philadelphia
- Cuban nationality law
- Cuban Spanish
- Cuban Uruguayans
- Cubans in Italy
- Hispanics
- History of Cuban Nationality
- List of Cuban Americans
- List of Cubans
- Spanish American
- Taíno
- White Hispanic
