= List of The New York Times number-one books of 1962 =

This is a list of books that topped The New York Times Best Seller list in 1962.

== Fiction ==
The following list ranks the number-one best-selling fiction books.

Four books topped the list that year, the longest on top being Ship of Fools by Katherine Anne Porter, which spent exactly half the year there – from April 29 to November 11, its last week at the top – though it continued in the top 15 best sellers for another 20 weeks. Franny and Zooey by J. D. Salinger started the year at the top of the list carrying over from 1961, where it entered the top spot on October 25. In all Salinger's book spent 25 continuous weeks in the top spot. The list was interrupted at the end of the year by the 1962–63 New York City newspaper strike which lasted 114 days and had a profound impact on the newspaper industry in New York.

Date	Book	Author
January 7	Franny and Zooey	J. D. Salinger
January 14	Franny and Zooey	J. D. Salinger
January 21	Franny and Zooey	J. D. Salinger
January 28	Franny and Zooey	J. D. Salinger
February 4	Franny and Zooey	J. D. Salinger
February 11	Franny and Zooey	J. D. Salinger
February 18	Franny and Zooey	J. D. Salinger
February 25	Franny and Zooey	J. D. Salinger
March 4	Franny and Zooey	J. D. Salinger
March 11	Franny and Zooey	J. D. Salinger
March 18	Franny and Zooey	J. D. Salinger
March 25	Franny and Zooey	J. D. Salinger
April 1	Franny and Zooey	J. D. Salinger
April 8	Franny and Zooey	J. D. Salinger
April 15	Franny and Zooey	J. D. Salinger
April 22	Franny and Zooey	J. D. Salinger
April 29	Ship of Fools	Katherine Anne Porter
May 6	Ship of Fools	Katherine Anne Porter
May 13	Ship of Fools	Katherine Anne Porter
May 20	Ship of Fools	Katherine Anne Porter
May 27	Ship of Fools	Katherine Anne Porter
June 3	Ship of Fools	Katherine Anne Porter
June 10	Ship of Fools	Katherine Anne Porter
June 17	Ship of Fools	Katherine Anne Porter
June 24	Ship of Fools	Katherine Anne Porter
July 1	Ship of Fools	Katherine Anne Porter
July 8	Ship of Fools	Katherine Anne Porter
July 15	Ship of Fools	Katherine Anne Porter
July 22	Ship of Fools	Katherine Anne Porter
July 29	Ship of Fools	Katherine Anne Porter
August 5	Ship of Fools	Katherine Anne Porter
August 12	Ship of Fools	Katherine Anne Porter
August 19	Ship of Fools	Katherine Anne Porter
August 26	Ship of Fools	Katherine Anne Porter
September 2	Ship of Fools	Katherine Anne Porter
September 9	Ship of Fools	Katherine Anne Porter
September 16	Ship of Fools	Katherine Anne Porter
September 23	Ship of Fools	Katherine Anne Porter
September 30	Ship of Fools	Katherine Anne Porter
October 7	Ship of Fools	Katherine Anne Porter
October 14	Ship of Fools	Katherine Anne Porter
October 21	Ship of Fools	Katherine Anne Porter
October 28	A Shade of Difference	Allen Drury
November 4	A Shade of Difference	Allen Drury
November 11	A Shade of Difference	Allen Drury
November 18	Seven Days in May	Fletcher Knebel and Charles W. Bailey II
November 25	A Shade of Difference	Allen Drury
December 2	Seven Days in May	Fletcher Knebel and Charles W. Bailey II
December 9	Not published due to a newspaper strike	
December 16	Not published due to a newspaper strike	
December 23	Not published due to a newspaper strike	
December 30	Not published due to a newspaper strike	

== Nonfiction ==
The following list ranks the number-one best-selling nonfiction books.

Date	Book	Author
January 7	The Making of the President 1960	Theodore H. White
January 14	The Making of the President 1960	Theodore H. White
January 21	My Life in Court	Louis Nizer
January 28	My Life in Court	Louis Nizer
February 4	My Life in Court	Louis Nizer
February 11	My Life in Court	Louis Nizer
February 18	My Life in Court	Louis Nizer
February 25	My Life in Court	Louis Nizer
March 4	My Life in Court	Louis Nizer
March 11	My Life in Court	Louis Nizer
March 18	My Life in Court	Louis Nizer
March 25	Calories Don't Count	Herman Taller
April 1	Calories Don't Count	Herman Taller
April 8	Calories Don't Count	Herman Taller
April 15	Calories Don't Count	Herman Taller
April 22	Calories Don't Count	Herman Taller
April 29	Calories Don't Count	Herman Taller
May 6	Calories Don't Count	Herman Taller
May 13	Calories Don't Count	Herman Taller
May 20	Calories Don't Count	Herman Taller
May 27	Calories Don't Count	Herman Taller
June 3	Calories Don't Count	Herman Taller
June 10	Calories Don't Count	Herman Taller
June 17	Calories Don't Count	Herman Taller
June 24	The Rothschilds	Frederic Morton
July 1	The Rothschilds	Frederic Morton
July 8	The Rothschilds	Frederic Morton
July 15	The Rothschilds	Frederic Morton
July 22	The Rothschilds	Frederic Morton
July 29	The Rothschilds	Frederic Morton
August 5	The Rothschilds	Frederic Morton
August 12	The Rothschilds	Frederic Morton
August 19	The Rothschilds	Frederic Morton
August 26	The Rothschilds	Frederic Morton
September 2	The Rothschilds	Frederic Morton
September 9	The Rothschilds	Frederic Morton
September 16	The Rothschilds	Frederic Morton
September 23	The Rothschilds	Frederic Morton
September 30	The Rothschilds	Frederic Morton
October 7	The Rothschilds	Frederic Morton
October 14	The Rothschilds	Frederic Morton
October 21	Travels with Charley	John Steinbeck
October 28	Silent Spring	Rachel Carson
November 4	Silent Spring	Rachel Carson
November 11	Silent Spring	Rachel Carson
November 18	Silent Spring	Rachel Carson
November 25	Silent Spring	Rachel Carson
December 2	Travels with Charley	John Steinbeck
December 9	Not published due to a newspaper strike	
December 16	Not published due to a newspaper strike	
December 23	Not published due to a newspaper strike	
December 30	Not published due to a newspaper strike	

== See also ==
- Publishers Weekly list of bestselling novels in the United States in the 1960s
