= 17th Writers Guild of America Awards =

17th WGA Awards
- Date: 1965
- Organized by: Writers Guild of America, East and the Writers Guild of America, West

The 17th Writers Guild of America Awards honored the best film writers and television writers of 1964. Winners were announced in 1965.

== Winners and nominees ==
=== Film ===
Winners are listed first highlighted in boldface.

**Best Written Musical**: **Mary Poppins, Screenplay by Bill Walsh and Don DaGradi; Based on the book by P.L. Travers**; Kissin' Cousins, Screenplay by Gerald Drayson Adams and Gene Nelson; Story by Gerald Drayson Adams; My Fair Lady, Screenplay by Alan Jay Lerner; Based on the play by George Bernard Shaw and the book by Alan Jay Lerner; Robin and the 7 Hoods, Written by David R. Schwartz; Roustabout, Screenplay by Anthony Lawrence and Allan Weiss; Story by Allan Weiss; The Unsinkable Molly Brown, Screenplay by Helen Deutsch; Based on the play by Richard Morris	**Best Written American Drama**: **Becket, Screenplay by Edward Anhalt; Based on the play by Jean Anouilh and Lucienne Hill**; One Potato, Two Potato, Screenplay by Raphael Hayes and Orville H. Hampton; Seven Days in May, Screenplay by Rod Serling; Based on the novel by Fletcher Knebel and Charles W. Bailey II; The Best Man, Screenplay by Gore Vidal; The Night of the Iguana, Screenplay by Anthony Veiller and John Huston; Based on the play by Tennessee Williams
**Best Written American Comedy**: **Dr. Strangelove or: How I Learned to Stop Worrying and Love the Bomb, Screenplay by Stanley Kubrick, Peter George and Terry Southern; Based on the book Red Alert by Peter George**; Father Goose, Screenplay by Peter Stone and Frank Tarloff; Story by S.H. Barnett; The Pink Panther, Screenplay by Maurice Richlin and Blake Edwards; The World of Henry Orient, Screenplay by Nora Johnson and Nunnally Johnson; Based on the novel by Nora Johnson; Topkapi, Screenplay by Monja Danischewsky; Based on the novel The Light of Day by Eric Ambler	

=== Television ===
**Episodic Comedy**: **"The Shoplifters" – The Andy Griffith Show (CBS) – Bill Idelson and Sam Bobrick**; **"My Husband Is the Best One" – The Dick Van Dyke Show (CBS) – Martin Ragaway**; "The Bowling Partners" – The Danny Thomas Show (ABC) – Jerry Belson and Garry Marshall; "Turtles, Ties, and Toreadors" – The Dick Van Dyke Show (CBS) – John Whedon; "October Eve" – The Dick Van Dyke Show (CBS) – Bill Persky and Sam Denoff	**Episodic Drama**: **"Who Do You Kill?" – East Side/West Side (CBS) – Arnold Perl**; "Wave Goodbye to Our Fair-Haired Boy" – Channing (ABC) – Kenneth Kolb; "Freedom Is a Lovesome Thing God Wot" – Channing (ABC) – Jack Guss, and Edmund Morris; "Owney Tupper Had a Daughter" – Gunsmoke (CBS) – Paul Savage; "The Non-Violent" – The Defenders (CBS) – Ernest Kinoy
**Anthology, Any Length**: **"The Game with Glass Pieces" – Bob Hope Presents the Chrysler Theatre (NBC) – Howard Rodman**; "A Slow Fade to Black" – Bob Hope Presents the Chrysler Theatre (NBC) – Rod Serling; "The Last Hangman" – The DuPont Show of the Week (NBC) – Ernest Kinoy; "Ride with Terro" – The DuPont Show of the Week (NBC) – Nicholas E. Baehr; "All the Comforts of Home" – The Richard Boone Show (NBC) – Paul Lucey

=== Special awards ===
Laurel Award for Screenwriting Achievement

**Sidney Buchman**

Valentine Davies Award

**James R. Webb**
