= Curtis LeMay =

American air force general (1906–1990)

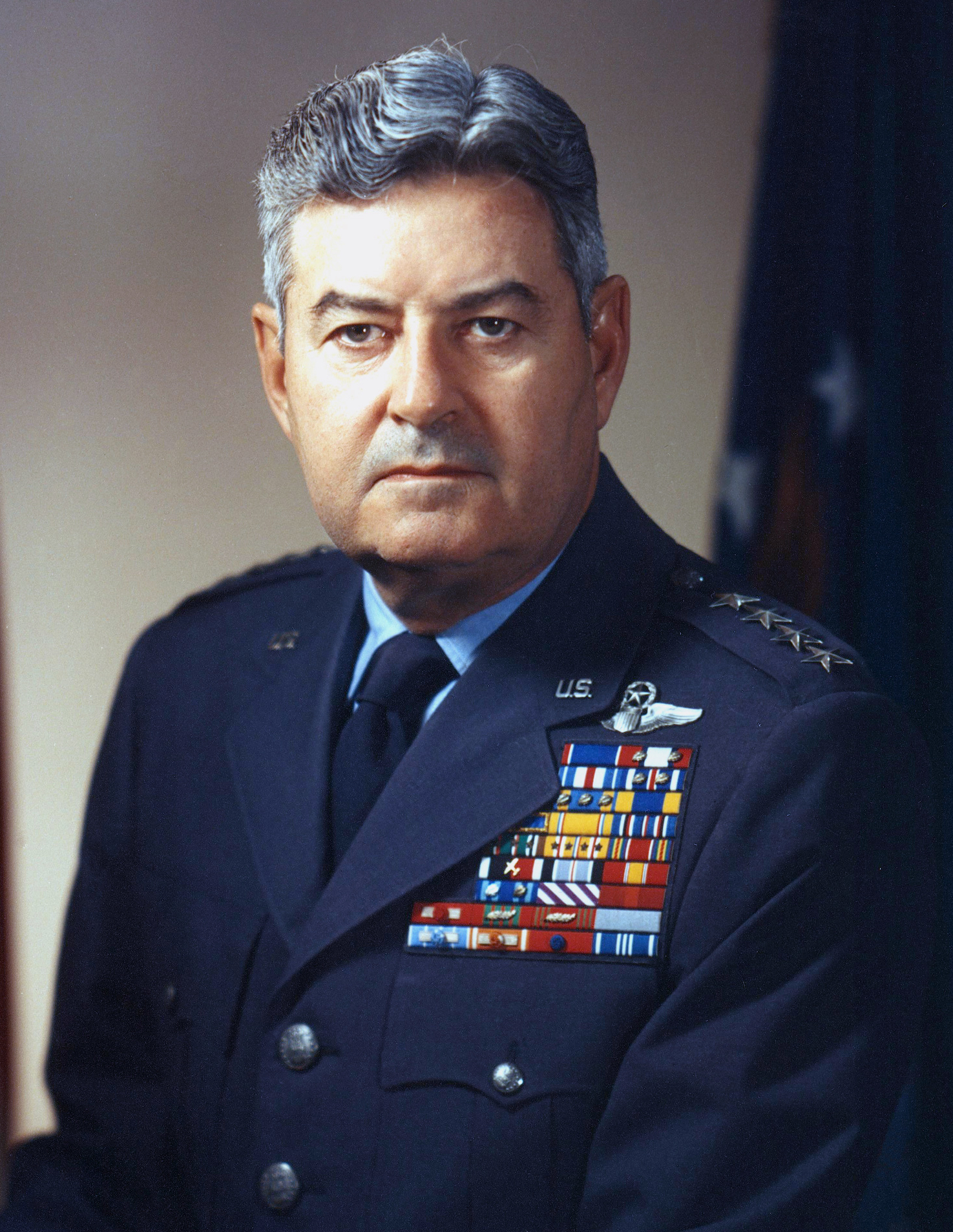
- Official portrait, c. 1950s
- Born: November 15, 1906; Columbus, Ohio, U.S.
- Died: October 1, 1990 (aged 83); March Air Force Base, California, U.S.
- Burial place: United States Air Force Academy Cemetery
- Other names: Old Iron Pants; The Demon; Bombs Away LeMay; The Big Cigar
- Education: Ohio State University (BS)
- Spouse: Helen Maitland (m. 1934)
- Children: 1
- Political party: Republican
- Other political affiliations: American Independent (1968)
- Military career
- Allegiance: United States
- Branch: United States Army; United States Army Air Corps; United States Army Air Forces; United States Air Force
- Service years: 1929–1965
- Rank: General
- Commands: Chief of Staff of the United States Air Force; Vice Chief of Staff of the United States Air Force; Strategic Air Command; Twentieth Air Force; XXI Bomber Command; XX Bomber Command; 3rd Air Division; 305th Bomb Group
- Conflicts: World War II; Korean War; Vietnam War
- Awards: Distinguished Service Cross; Army Distinguished Service Medal (3); Silver Star; Distinguished Flying Cross (3); Air Medal (5); Grand Cordon of the Order of the Rising Sun (Japan)

Curtis Emerson LeMay (November 15, 1906 – October 1, 1990) was a U.S. Air Force general who was a key American military commander during World War II and the Cold War, including the Korean War. He served as Chief of Staff of the United States Air Force from 1961 to 1965.

LeMay joined the United States Army Air Corps, the precursor to the United States Air Force, in 1929 while studying civil engineering at Ohio State University. He had risen to the rank of major by the time of Japan's attack on Pearl Harbor in December 1941 and the United States' entry into World War II. He commanded the 305th Bombardment Group from October 1942 until September 1943, and the 3rd Air Division in the European theatre of World War II until August 1944, when he was transferred to the China Burma India Theater. He was then placed in command of strategic bombing operations against Japan, planning and executing a massive fire bombing campaign against 66 Japanese cities, and Operation Starvation, a crippling minelaying campaign in Japan's internal waterways.

After the war, he was assigned to command USAF Europe and coordinated the Berlin Airlift. He served as commander of the Strategic Air Command (SAC) from 1948 to 1957, where he presided over the transition to an all–jet aircraft force that had a strong emphasis on the delivery of nuclear weapons in the event of war. As Chief of Staff of the United States Air Force (USAF), he called for the bombing of Cuban missile sites during the Cuban Missile Crisis and sought a sustained bombing campaign against North Vietnam during the Vietnam War.

After retiring from the Air Force in 1965, LeMay agreed to serve as pro-segregation Alabama Governor George Wallace's running mate on the far-right American Independent Party ticket in the 1968 US presidential election. The ticket won 46 electoral votes, five states, and 13.5% of the popular vote, a strong tally for a third party campaign, but the Wallace campaign came to see LeMay as a liability due to his controversial stance promoting the use of nuclear weapons. After the election, LeMay retired to Newport Beach, California.

== Early life ==
LeMay was born in Columbus, Ohio, on November 15, 1906. LeMay was of English and distant French Huguenot heritage. His father, Erving Edwin LeMay, was at times an ironworker and general handyman, but he never held a job longer than a few months. His mother, Arizona Dove (née Carpenter) LeMay, did her best to hold her family together. With very limited income, his family moved around the country as his father looked for work, going as far as Montana and California. Eventually they returned to his native city of Columbus. LeMay attended Columbus public schools, graduating from Columbus South High School. Working his way through college, LeMay studied civil engineering at Ohio State University and graduated with a bachelor's degree in civil engineering. While at Ohio State, he was a member of the National Society of Pershing Rifles and the Professional Engineering Fraternity Theta Tau.

== Career ==
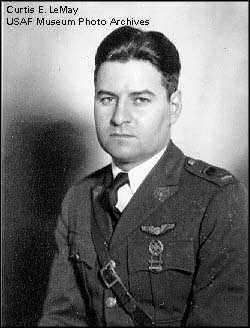
Lieutenant Curtis LeMay in 1929

LeMay was commissioned a second lieutenant in the Air Corps Reserve in October 1929. He received a regular commission in the United States Army Air Corps in January 1930. While finishing at Ohio State University, he took flight training at Norton Field in Columbus, Ohio in from 1931 to 1932. On June 9, 1934, he married Helen Maitland.

LeMay became a pursuit pilot with his first duty station at Selfridge Field with the 27th Pursuit Squadron. After having served in various assignments in fighter operations, LeMay transferred to bomber aircraft in 1937. While stationed in Hawaii, he became one of the first members of the Air Corps to receive specialized training in aerial navigation. In August 1937, as navigator under pilot and commander Caleb V. Haynes on a Boeing B-17 Flying Fortress, he helped locate the battleship Utah despite being given the wrong coordinates by Navy personnel, in exercises held in misty conditions off California, after which the group of B-17s bombed it with water bombs.

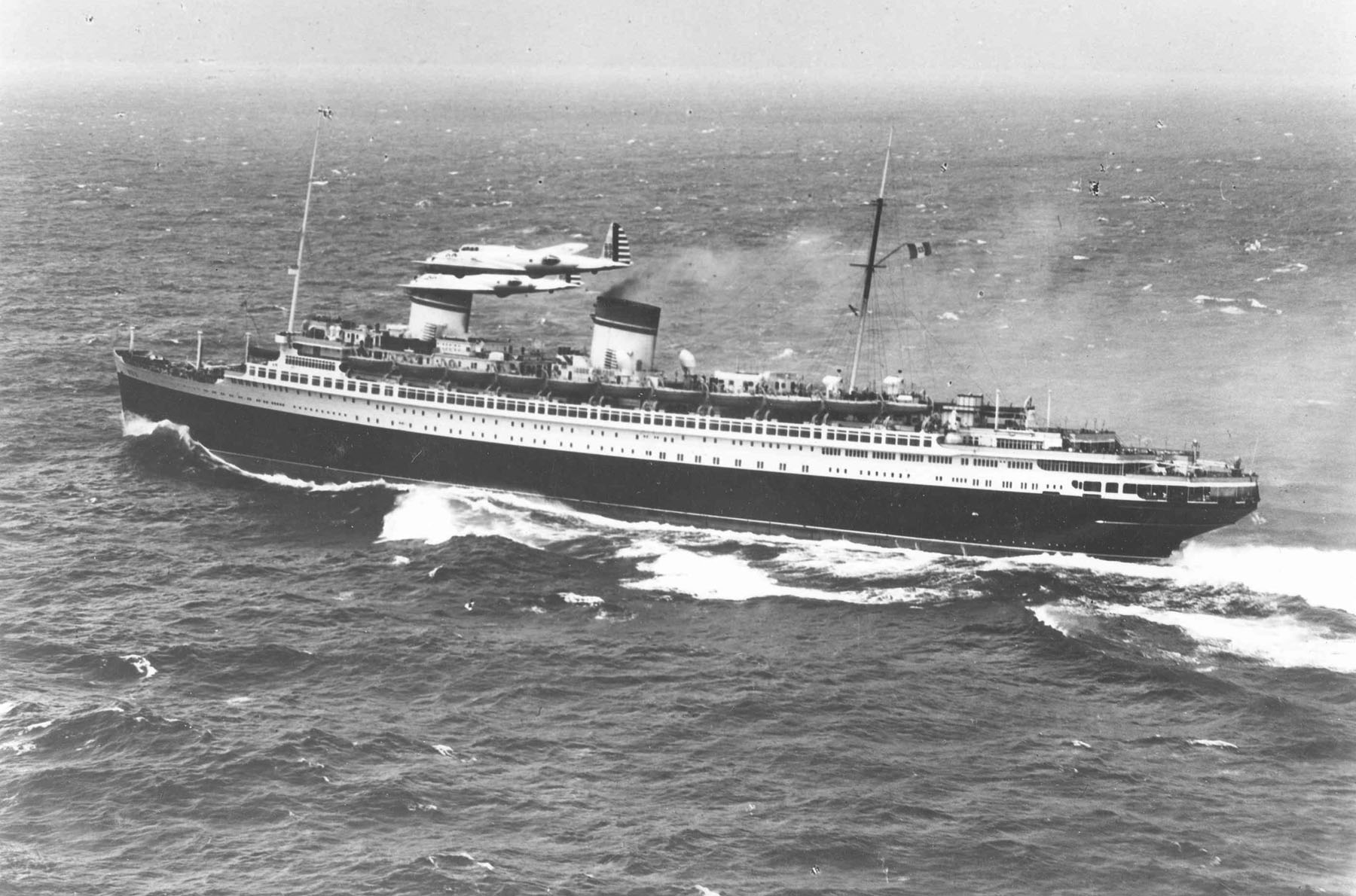
In 1938, three B-17s (one navigated by Lt. LeMay) intercept the Italian liner SS Rex, 620 nm at sea.

In March 1938, LeMay as a member of the 2nd Bombardment Group participated in a good will flight to Buenos Aires. For this flight, the 2nd Bombardment Group was awarded the Mackay Trophy in 1939. For Haynes again, in May 1938 he navigated three B-17s 620 nautical miles (710 mi; 1,150 km) over the Atlantic Ocean to intercept the Italian liner SS Rex to illustrate the ability of land-based airpower to defend the American coasts. In 1940 he was navigator for Haynes on the prototype Boeing XB-15 heavy bomber, flying a survey from Panama over the Galapagos islands. By the end of 1940, he was stationed at Westover Air Reserve Base, as the operations officer of the 34th Bombardment Group. War brought rapid promotion and increased responsibility.

When his crews were not flying missions, they were subjected to relentless training, as LeMay believed that training was the key to saving their lives. "You fight as you train," was one of his cardinal rules. It expressed his belief that, in the chaos, stress, and confusion of combat (aerial or otherwise), troops or airmen would perform successfully only if their individual acts were second nature, performed nearly instinctively due to repetitive training. Throughout his career, LeMay was widely and fondly known among his troops as "Old Iron Pants," and the "Big Cigar".

== World War II ==
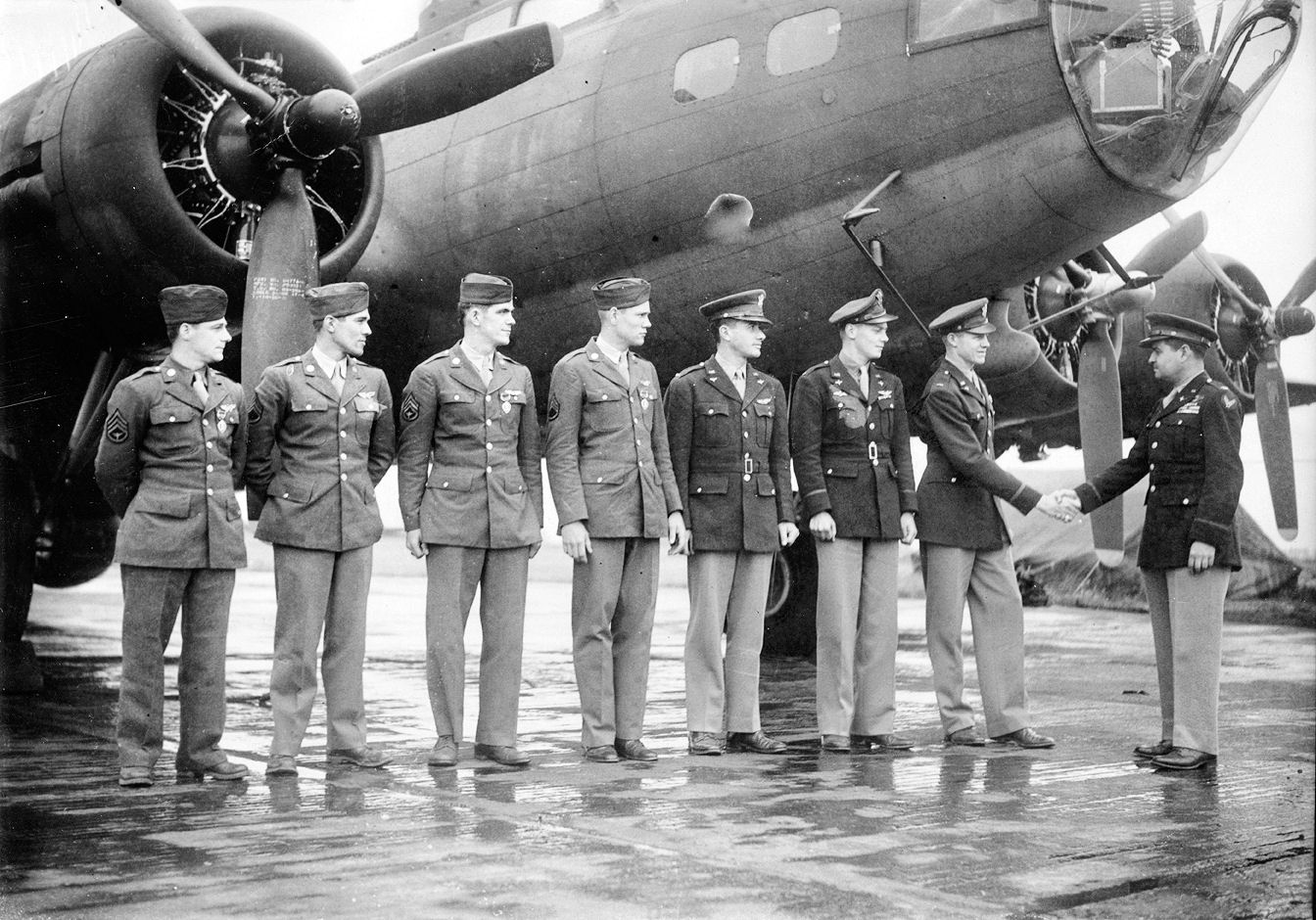
Colonel Curtis LeMay officially congratulates a bomber crew of the 306th Bomb Group in front of their B-17 Flying Fortress at Chelveston Airfield, England, June 2, 1943.

=== European Theatre ===
When the United States entered World War II in December 1941 after the Japanese attack on Pearl Harbor, LeMay was a major in the United States Army Air Forces (he had been a first lieutenant as recently as 1940), and the commander of a newly created B-17 Flying Fortress unit, the 305th Bomb Group. He took this unit to England in October 1942 as part of the Eighth Air Force and led it in combat until May 1943, notably helping to develop the combat box formation. In September 1943, he became the first commander of the newly formed 3rd Air Division. He personally led several dangerous missions, including the Regensburg section of the Schweinfurt–Regensburg mission of August 17, 1943. In that mission, he led 146 B-17s to Regensburg, Germany, beyond the range of escorting fighters, and, after bombing, continued on to bases in North Africa, losing 24 bombers in the process.

The heavy losses in veteran crews on this and subsequent deep penetration missions in the autumn of 1943 led the Eighth Air Force to limit missions to targets within escort range. With the deployment in the European theatre of the P-51 Mustang in January 1944, the Eighth Air Force gained an escort fighter with range to match the bombers.

In a discussion of a report into high abort rates in bomber missions during World War II, which Robert McNamara suspected was because of pilot cowardice, McNamara described LeMay's character:

One of the commanders was Curtis LeMay—Colonel in command of a B-24 [sic] group. He was the finest combat commander of any service I came across in war. But he was extraordinarily belligerent, many thought brutal. He got the report. He issued an order. He said, 'I will be in the lead plane on every mission. Any plane that takes off will go over the target, or the crew will be court-martialed.' The abort rate dropped overnight. Now that's the kind of commander he was. (Note: See Robert McNamara § World War II for more details on the wartime relationship between LeMay and McNamara)

=== Pacific Theatre ===
==== Allied strategy and bombing of Japanese cities ====
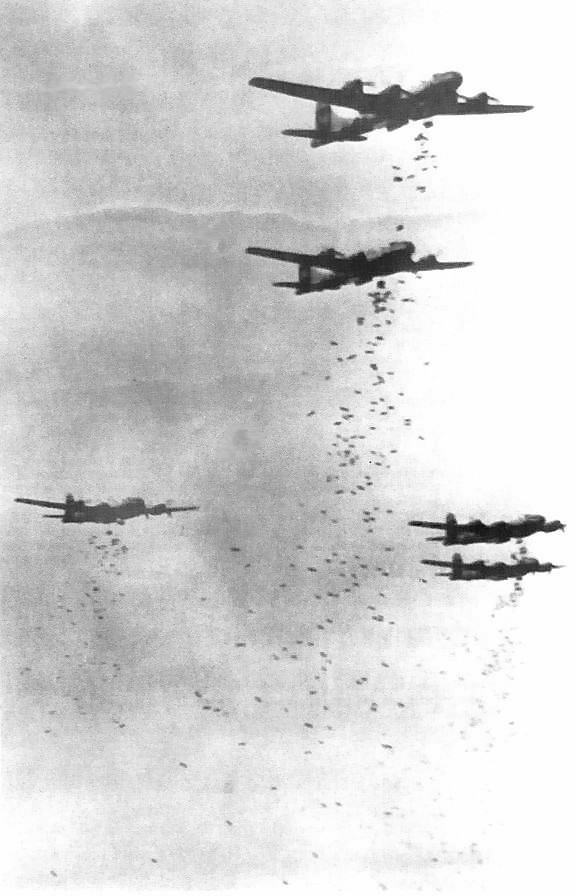
LeMay made massive incendiary attacks on Japanese cities with hundreds of planes at low altitudes. Here B-29 bombers drop hundreds of incendiary bombs (cluster bombs, magnesium bombs, white phosphorus bombs, and napalm) on Yokohama in a raid on May 29, 1945.

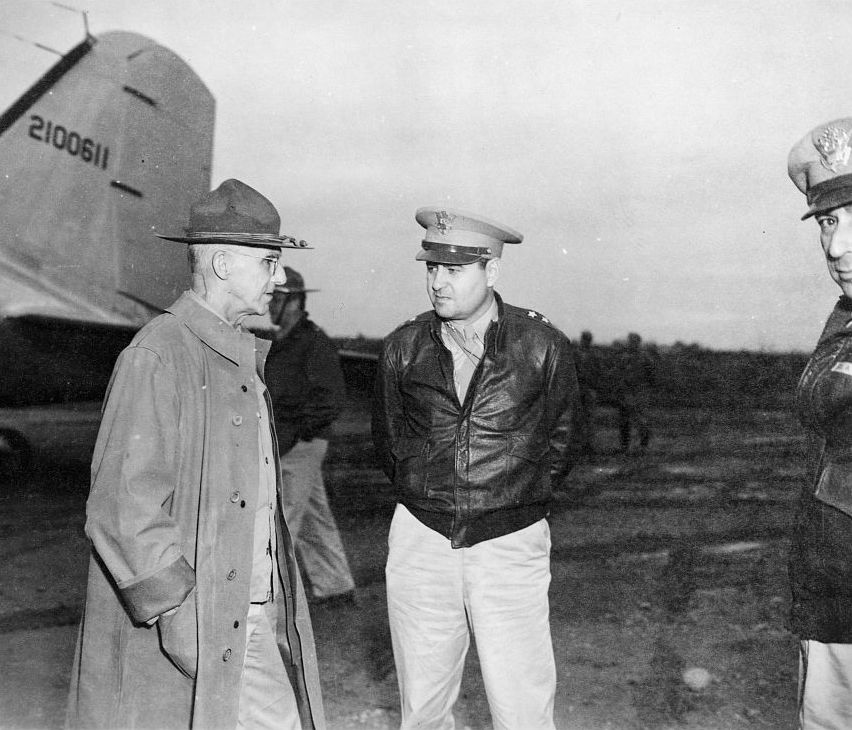
LeMay with General Joseph W. Stilwell

In August 1944, LeMay transferred to the China-Burma-India theater and directed first the XX Bomber Command in China and then the XXI Bomber Command in the Pacific. LeMay was later placed in charge of all strategic air operations against the Japanese home islands. In January 1945, LeMay was transferred from China to relieve Brigadier General Haywood S. Hansell as commander of the XXI Bomber Command in the Marianas.

LeMay soon concluded that the techniques and tactics developed for use in Europe against the Luftwaffe were unsuitable against Japan. His B-29 Superfortress bombers flying from China were dropping their bombs near their targets only 5% of the time. Operational losses of aircraft and crews were unacceptably high owing to Japanese daylight air defenses and continuing mechanical problems with the B-29. Furthermore, LeMay became convinced that high-altitude daytime precision attacks would be ineffective, given the usually cloudy weather over Japan. Bombs dropped from the B-29s at high-altitude—above 20,000 feet (6,100 m)—were often blown off their trajectories by a consistently powerful jet stream over the Japanese home islands, which dramatically reduced the effectiveness of the high-altitude raids. Because Japanese air defenses made daytime bombing below jet stream-affected altitudes too perilous, LeMay finally switched to low-altitude nighttime incendiary attacks on Japanese targets, a tactic senior commanders had been preparing for some time, manufacturing and stockpiling incendiary bombs for this purpose. Japanese cities were largely constructed of combustible materials such as wood and paper. High-altitude daylight precision bombing was ordered to proceed only when weather permitted or when specific critical targets were not vulnerable to area bombing.

LeMay commanded subsequent B-29 Superfortress combat operations against Japan, including massive incendiary attacks on 67 Japanese cities and the atomic bombings of Hiroshima and Nagasaki. This included the firebombing of Tokyo on the night of 9–10 March 1945—known in official documents as Operation Meetinghouse—which proved to be the single most destructive aerial bombing raid of World War II. For this first attack, LeMay ordered the defensive guns removed from 325 American B-29 heavy bomber planes, loaded each aircraft with M-47 incendiary clusters, magnesium bombs, white phosphorus bombs and napalm, and ordered the B-29s to fly in streams at 5,000 to 9,000 ft (1,500 to 2,700 m) over the Japanese capital of Tokyo. LeMay described Operation Meetinghouse by saying "the US had finally stopped swatting at flies and gone after the manure pile." The first pathfinder airplanes arrived over Tokyo just after midnight on March 10 and marked the target area with a flaming "X". In a 3-hour period, the main bombing force dropped 1,665 tons of incendiary bombs, killing 100,000 civilians, destroying 250,000 buildings, and incinerating 16 square-miles (41 km^{2}) of the city. Members of the aircrews at the tail end of the bomber stream reported that the stench of burned human flesh permeated the aircraft over the target.

Although precise figures are not available, the firebombing campaign against Japanese cities, directed by LeMay between March 1945 and the surrender of Japan in August 1945, may have killed more than 500,000 Japanese civilians and left 5 million homeless. Official estimates from the United States Strategic Bombing Survey put the figures at 220,000 people killed. Some 40% of the built-up areas of 66 cities in Japan were destroyed, including much of Japan's war industry.

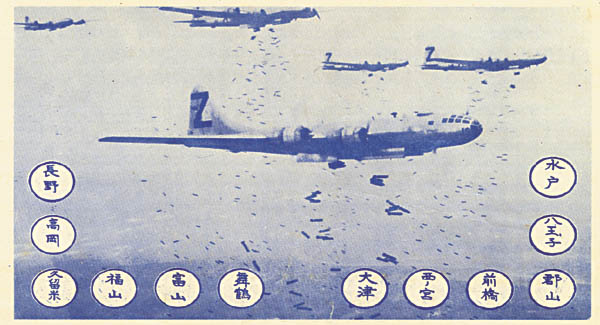
A "LeMay Bombing Leaflet" in Japanese: "Unfortunately, bombs have no eyes. So, in accordance with America's humanitarian policies, the American Air Force, which does not wish to injure innocent people, now gives you warning to evacuate the cities named and save your lives".

LeMay was aware of the implication of his orders. The New York Times reported at the time, "Maj. Gen. Curtis E. LeMay, commander of the B-29s of the entire Marianas area, declared that if the war is shortened by a single day, the attack will have served its purpose." The argument was that it was his duty to carry out the attacks in order to end the war as quickly as possible, sparing further loss of life. He also remarked regarding the morality of the air effort against Japan, "I suppose if I had lost the war, I would have been tried as a war criminal." This opinion was also reported by Robert McNamara in the 2003 documentary The Fog of War.

U.S. Presidents Franklin D. Roosevelt and Harry S. Truman supported LeMay's strategy, referring to an estimate of 1 million Allied casualties if Japan had to be invaded. Japan had intentionally decentralized 90% of its war-related production into small subcontractor workshops in civilian districts, making remaining Japanese war industry largely immune to conventional precision bombing with high explosives. As the firebombing campaign took effect, Japanese war planners were forced to expend significant resources to relocate vital war industries to remote caves and mountain bunkers, reducing production of war materiel.

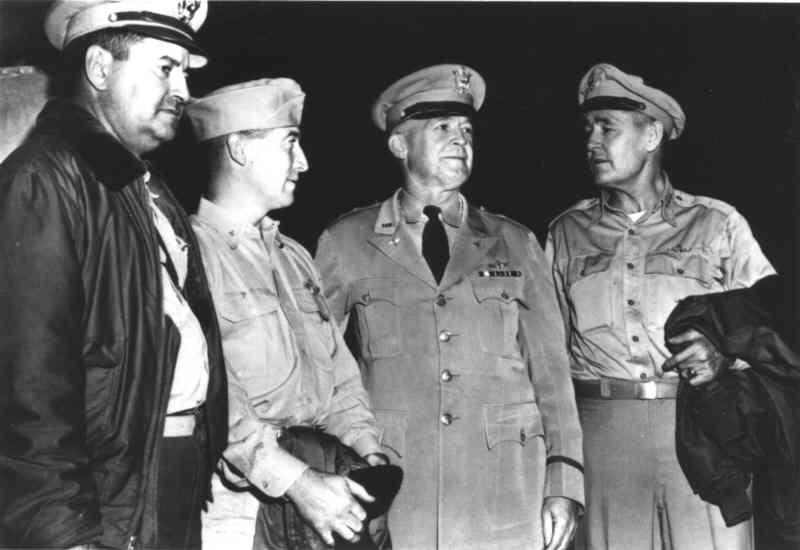
LeMay with generals Henry H. Arnold, Barney M. Giles and Emmett O. Donnell

In addition, LeMay also oversaw Operation Starvation, an aerial mining operation against Japanese waterways and ports that disrupted Japanese shipping and logistics. Although his superiors were unsupportive of this naval objective, LeMay gave it a high priority by assigning the entire 313th Bombardment Wing (four groups, about 160 airplanes) to the task. Aerial mining supplemented a tight Allied submarine blockade of the home islands, drastically reducing Japan's ability to supply its overseas forces to the point that postwar analysis concluded that it could have defeated Japan on its own had it begun earlier.

=== Japan–Washington flight ===
LeMay piloted one of three specially modified B-29s flying from Japan to the United States in September 1945, in the process breaking several aviation records, including the greatest USAAF takeoff weight, the longest USAAF non-stop flight, and the first ever non-stop Japan–Chicago flight. One of the pilots was of higher rank: Lieutenant General Barney M. Giles. The other two aircraft used up more fuel than LeMay's in fighting headwinds, and they could not fly to Washington, D.C., the original goal. Their pilots landed in Chicago to refuel. LeMay's aircraft had sufficient fuel to reach Washington, but he was directed by the War Department to join the others by refueling at Chicago.

== Cold War ==
=== Berlin Airlift ===
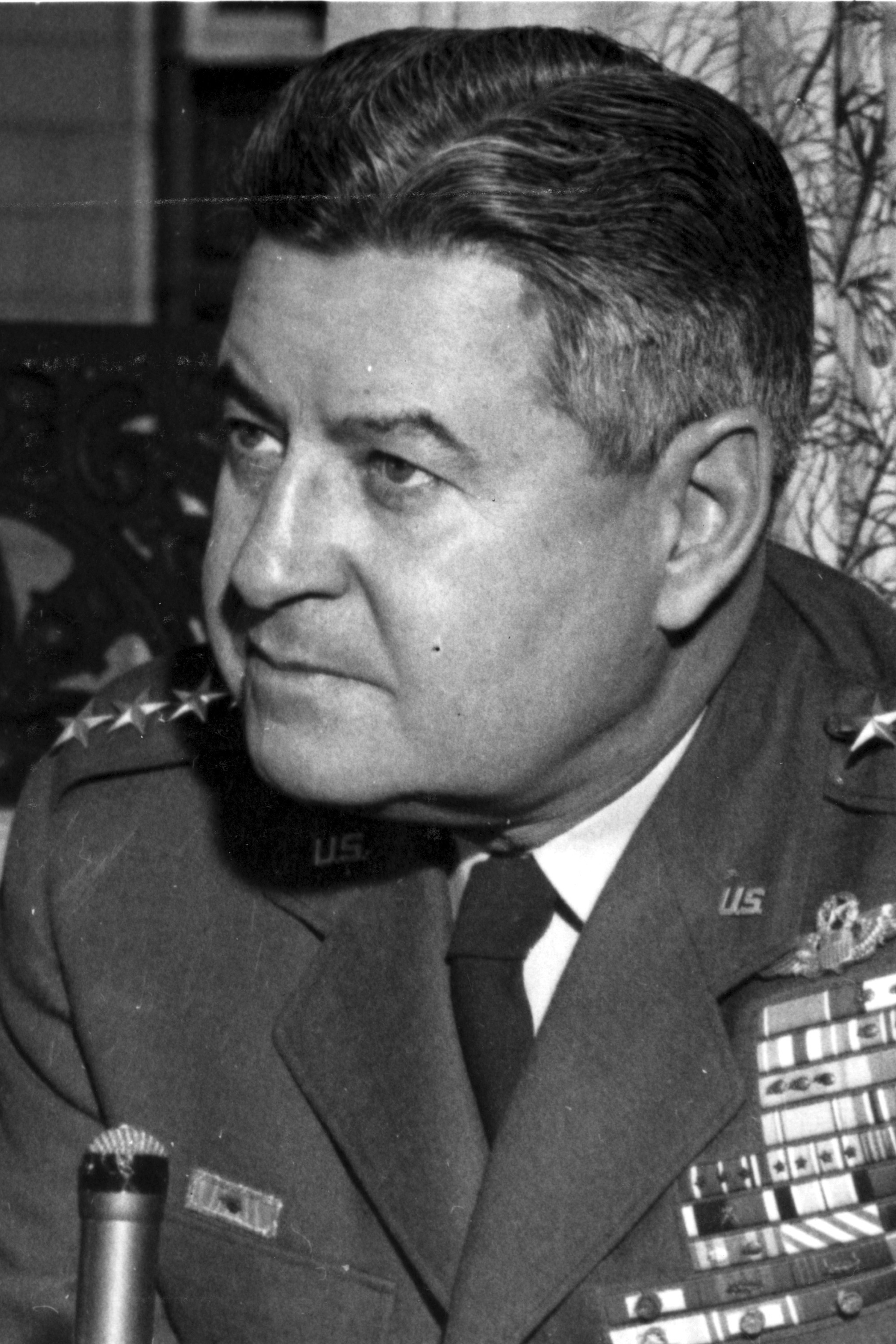
General Curtis E. LeMay

After World War II, LeMay was already thinking about deterrence theory and how the next war would be fought. He was briefly transferred to The Pentagon as deputy chief of Air Staff for Research & Development. In 1947, LeMay returned to Europe as commander of USAF Europe, heading operations for the Berlin Airlift in 1948 in the face of a blockade by the Soviet Union and its satellite states that threatened to starve the civilian population of the Western occupation zones of Berlin. Under his direction, Douglas C-54 Skymasters that could each carry 10 tons of cargo began supplying the city on July 1. By late 1948, the airlift was bringing in an average of 5,000 tons of supplies a day with 500 daily flights. The airlift continued for eleven months, with 213,000 flights operated by six countries bringing in 1.7 million tons of food and fuel to Berlin. Faced with the failure of its blockade, the Soviet Union relented and reopened land corridors to the West. Though LeMay is sometimes publicly credited with the success of the Berlin Airlift, it was, in fact, instigated by General Lucius D. Clay when Clay called LeMay about the problem. LeMay initially started flying supplies into Berlin, but then decided that it was a job for a logistics expert and he found that person in Lieutenant General William H. Tunner, who took over the operational aspects of the Berlin Airlift.

=== Strategic Air Command ===
In 1948 he returned to the United States to head the Strategic Air Command (SAC) at Offutt Air Force Base, replacing General George Kenney. When LeMay took over command of SAC, it consisted of little more than a few understaffed B-29 bombardment groups left over from World War II. Less than half of the available aircraft were operational, and the crews were under-trained. Base and aircraft security standards were minimal. Upon inspecting a SAC hangar full of US nuclear strategic bombers, LeMay found a single Air Force sentry on duty, unarmed. After ordering a mock bombing exercise on Dayton, Ohio, LeMay was shocked to learn that most of the strategic bombers assigned to the mission missed their targets by one mile or more. "We didn't have one crew, not one crew, in the entire command who could do a professional job," noted LeMay.

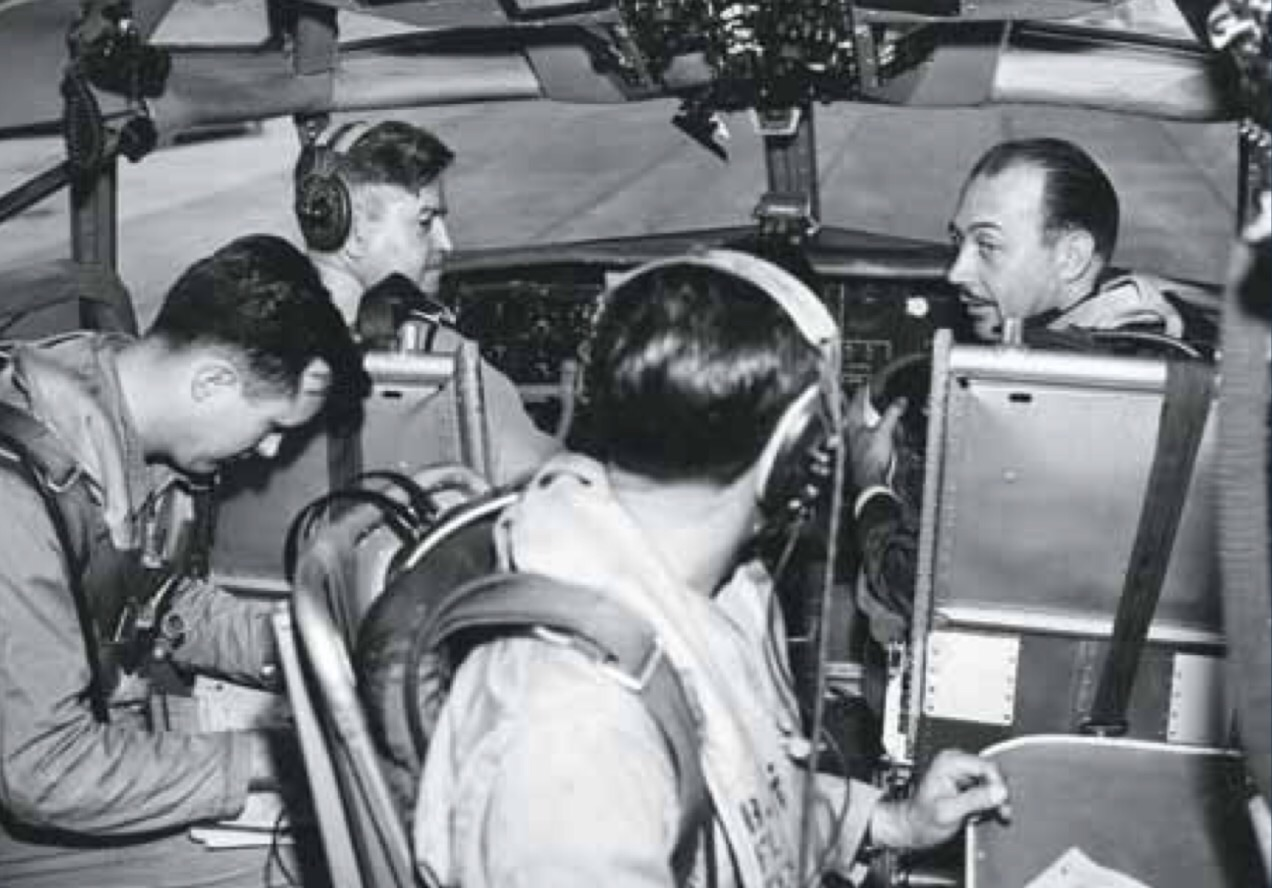
General LeMay flying a Boeing KC-135 Stratotanker during his tenure as Commander-in-Chief of the Strategic Air Command

A meeting in November 1948, with Air Force Chief of Staff Hoyt Vandenberg, found the two men agreeing the primary mission of SAC should be the capability of delivering 80% of the nation's atomic bombs in one mission. At the Dualism Conference in December 1948, the Air Force leadership rallied behind LeMay's position that the service's highest priority was to deliver the SAC atomic offensive "in one fell swoop telescoping mass and time." "To LeMay, demolishing everything was how you win a war." Towards this aim, LeMay delivered the first SAC Emergency War Plan in March 1949 which called for dropping 133 atomic bombs on 70 cities in the USSR within thirty days. LeMay predicted that World War III would last no longer than 30 days. Air power strategists called this type of pre-emptive strike "killing a nation." However, the Harmon committee released their unanimous report two months later stating such an attack would not end a war with the Soviets and their industry would quickly recover. This committee had been specifically created by the Joint Chiefs of Staff to study the effects of a massive nuclear strike against the Soviet Union. Nevertheless, within weeks, an ad hoc Joint Chiefs committee recommended tripling America's nuclear arsenal, and USAF Chief of Staff Vandenberg called for enough bombs to attack 220 targets, up from the previous seventy.

Upon receiving his fourth star in 1951 at age 44, LeMay became the youngest American four-star general since Ulysses S. Grant. He would also become the longest serving person in that rank in American military history.

In 1954, LeMay remarked to pilot Hal Austin, whose plane had been damaged by a MiG-17 while on a reconnaissance mission over the Soviet Union, "Well, maybe if we do this overflight right, we can get World War III started." Hal Austin assumed that LeMay was joking, but years later, after LeMay retired, Austin saw him again and "brought up the subject of the mission we had flown. And he remembered it like it was yesterday. We chatted about it a little bit. His comment again was, 'Well, we'd have been a hell of a lot better off if we'd got World War III started in those days.'"

In 1956 and 1957, LeMay implemented tests of 24-hour bomber and tanker alerts, keeping some bomber forces ready at all times. LeMay headed SAC until 1957, overseeing its transformation into a modern and efficient all-jet force. LeMay's tenure was the longest over an American military command in nearly 100 years.

=== Korean War ===
As head of the Strategic Air Command, LeMay was involved in the Korean War as part of the US-led United Nations Command (UNC) forces, who were supporting South Korea (Republic of Korea) against North Korea. In an 1988 interview with U.S. Air Force historians, LeMay discussed the U.N. Command's strategy during the war:

Right at the start of the war, unofficially, I slipped a message in "under the carpet" in the Pentagon that we ought to turn SAC loose with some incendiaries on some North Korean towns. The answer came back, under the carpet again, that there would be too many civilian casualties; we couldn't do anything like that. We went over there and fought the war and eventually burned down every town in North Korea anyway, some way or another, and some in South Korea, too … [So] over a period of three years or so we killed off, what, 20 percent of the population of Korea, as direct casualties of war or from starvation and exposure? Over a period of three years, this seemed to be acceptable to everybody, but to kill a few people at the start right away, no, we can't seem to stomach that."

In his 1973 book Soldier, Lieutenant Colonel Anthony B. Herbert quotes LeMay stating: "we killed off over a million civilian Koreans and drove several million from their homes." According to Historian John W. Dower, LeMay was "not taking pride in this devastation, but rather arguing that immediate and massive bombing of key cities in North Korea might have been more effective and less costly in human terms than the devastation wreaked in the protracted air war."

=== The "Airpower Battle" ===
==== USAF airpower development and LeMay's style ====
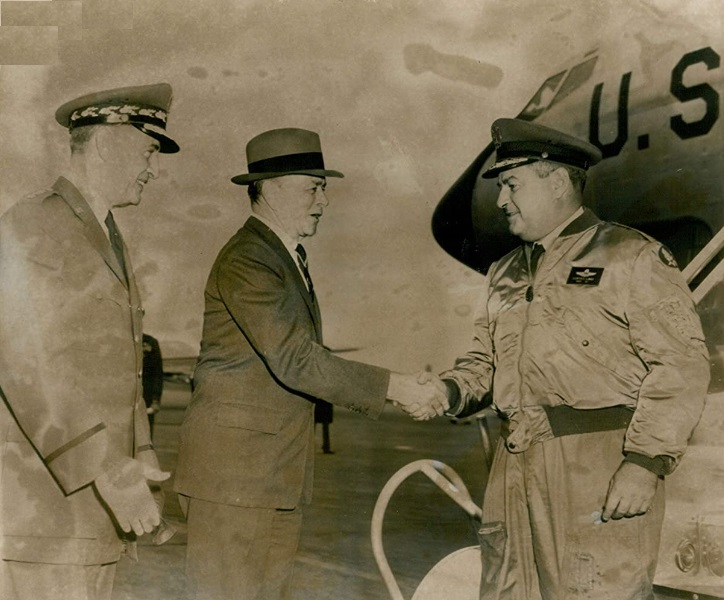
Air Force Vice Chief of Staff General Curtis LeMay greeted by Secretary of the Air Force James H. Douglas Jr. and Chairman of The Joint Chiefs of Staff General Nathan F. Twining at Washington National Airport, upon LeMay's return from Boeing KC-135 Stratotanker non-stop flight from Buenos Aires, Argentina in November 15, 1957

LeMay was instrumental in SAC's acquisition of a large fleet of new strategic bombers, establishment of a vast aerial refueling system, the formation of many new units and bases, development of a strategic ballistic missile force, and establishment of a strict command and control system with an unprecedented readiness capability. All of this was protected by a greatly enhanced and modernized security force, the Strategic Air Command Elite Guard. LeMay insisted on rigorous training and very high standards of performance for all SAC personnel, be they officers, enlisted men, aircrews, mechanics, or administrative staff, and reportedly commented, "I have neither the time nor the inclination to differentiate between the incompetent and the merely unfortunate."

Life magazine reported that LeMay once took the copilot's seat of a SAC bomber to observe the mission, complete with lit cigar. When asked by the pilot to put out the cigar, LeMay asked why. When the pilot explained that fumes inside the fuselage could explode, LeMay growled, "It wouldn't dare." The incident was used as the basis for a fictional scene in the 1955 film Strategic Air Command. In his controversial and factually disputed memoir War's End, Major General Charles Sweeney related an alleged 1944 incident that may have been the basis for the "It wouldn't dare" comment. Sweeney stated that a similar incident occurred in 1944 when a B-29 crew chief reminded General LeMay of his lit cigar while LeMay was undergoing B-29 familiarization with (then-Colonel) Paul Tibbets' 509th Composite Group.

Despite his uncompromising attitude regarding performance of duty, LeMay was also known for his concern for the physical well-being and comfort of his men. LeMay found ways to encourage morale, individual performance, and the re-enlistment rate through a number of means: encouraging off-duty group recreational activities, instituting spot promotions based on performance, and authorizing special uniforms, training, equipment, and allowances for ground personnel, as well as flight crews.

On LeMay's departure, SAC was composed of 224,000 airmen, close to 2,000 heavy bombers, and nearly 800 tanker aircraft.

LeMay was appointed Vice Chief of Staff of the United States Air Force in July 1957, serving until 1961.

== Chief of Staff of the United States Air Force, 1961–1965 ==
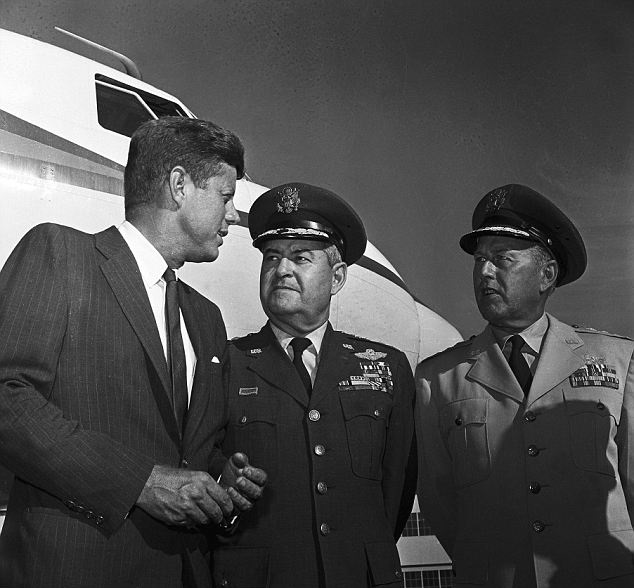
Air Force Chief of Staff General Curtis E. LeMay with U.S. President John F. Kennedy and Strategic Air Command's Commander General Thomas S. Power at Offutt Air Force Base, Nebraska.

Following service as USAF Vice Chief of Staff (1957–1961), LeMay was made the fifth chief of staff of the United States Air Force (USAF) on the retirement of General Thomas White. His belief in the efficacy of strategic air campaigns over tactical strikes and ground support operations became Air Force policy during his tenure as chief of staff.

As chief of staff, LeMay clashed repeatedly with Secretary of Defense Robert McNamara, Air Force Secretary Eugene Zuckert, and the chairman of the Joint Chiefs of Staff, Army General Maxwell D. Taylor. At the time, budget constraints and successive nuclear war fighting strategies had left the armed forces in a state of flux. Each of the armed forces had gradually jettisoned realistic appraisals of future conflicts in favor of developing its own separate nuclear and nonnuclear capabilities. At the height of this struggle, the U.S. Army had even reorganized its combat divisions to fight land wars on irradiated nuclear battlefields, developing short-range atomic cannon and mortars in order to win appropriations. The U.S. Navy in turn proposed delivering strategic nuclear weapons from supercarriers intended to sail into range of the Soviet air defense forces. Of all these various schemes, only LeMay's command structure of SAC survived complete reorganization in the changing reality of Cold War-era conflicts.

LeMay was not an enthusiast of the ICBM program, considering ballistic missiles to be little more than toys and no substitute for the strategic nuclear bomber force.

Though LeMay lost significant appropriation battles for the Skybolt ALBM and the proposed Boeing B-52 Stratofortress replacement, the North American XB-70 Valkyrie, he was largely successful at expanding Air Force budgets. Despite LeMay's disdain for missiles, he did strongly support the use of military space programs to perform satellite reconnaissance and gather electronic intelligence. For comparison, the U.S. Army and Navy frequently suffered budgetary cutbacks and program cancellations by Congress and Defense Secretary McNamara.

=== Kennedy years ===
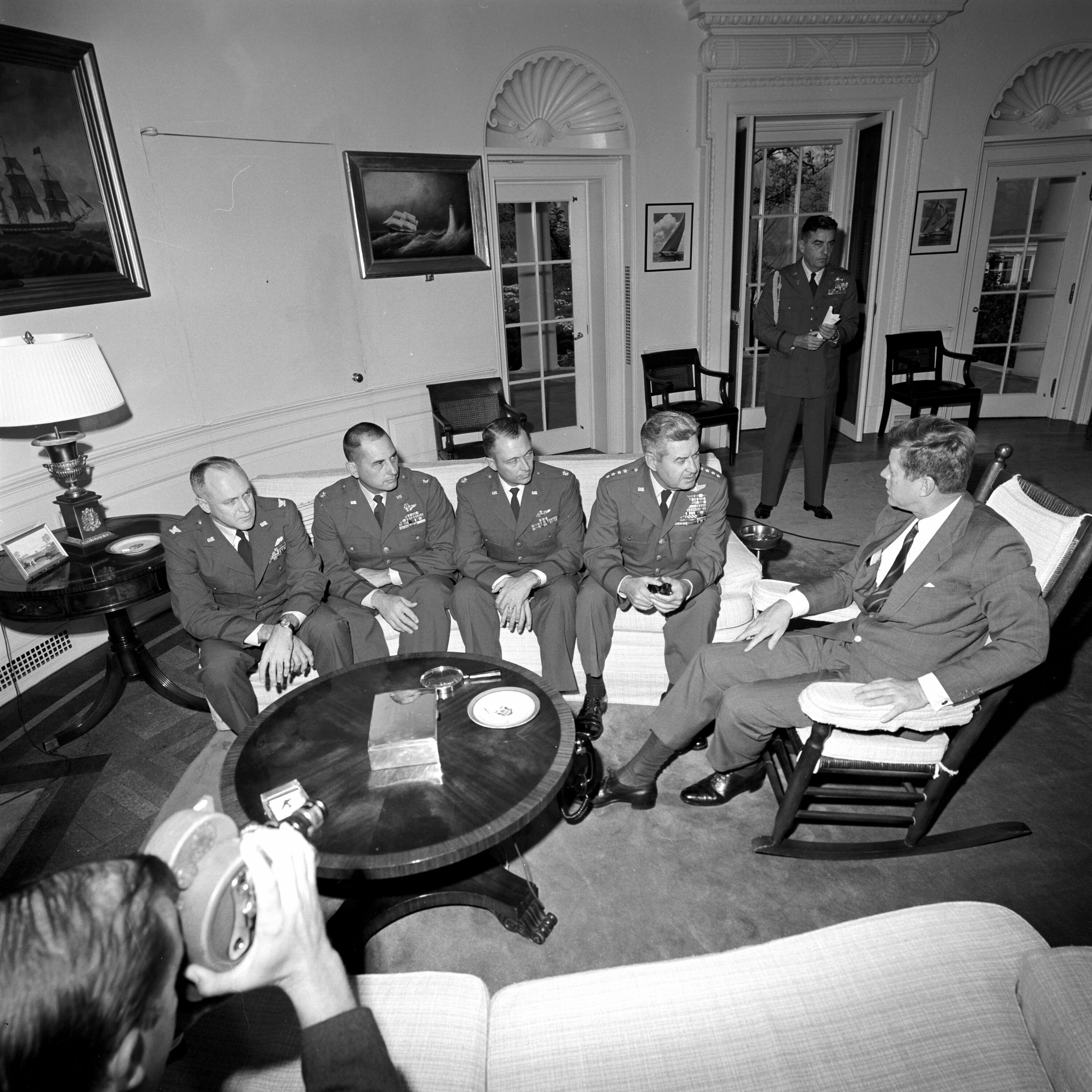
General LeMay conversed with President Kennedy at the Oval Office, White House in October 1962.

LeMay was bitterly critical of the Kennedy administration. He described the so-called "Whiz Kids" in the U.S. Department of Defense as "the most egotistical people that I have ever seen in my whole life. They had no faith in the military at all. They felt that the Harvard Business School method of solving problems would solve any problem in the world."

During the Cuban Missile Crisis in 1962, LeMay clashed again with U.S. President John F. Kennedy and Secretary of Defense Robert McNamara, arguing that he should be allowed to bomb nuclear missile sites in Cuba. He opposed the naval blockade and, after the end of the crisis, suggested that Cuba be invaded anyway, even after the Soviets agreed to withdraw their missiles. Kennedy refused LeMay's requests, and the naval blockade was successful.

LeMay told Kennedy that his refusal to invade Cuba was "almost as bad as the appeasement at Munich" and the "greatest defeat in our history." Twenty-five years later, LeMay still believed that "We could have gotten not only the missiles out of Cuba, we could have gotten the Communists out of Cuba at that time."

=== Strategic philosophy ===
The memorandum from LeMay, USAF chief of staff, to the Joint Chiefs of Staff, on January 4, 1964, illustrates LeMay's reasons for keeping bomber forces alongside ballistic missiles: "It is important to recognize, however, that ballistic missile forces represent both the U.S. and Soviet potential for strategic nuclear warfare at the highest, most indiscriminate level, and at a level least susceptible to control. The employment of these weapons in lower level conflict would be likely to escalate the situation, uncontrollably, to an intensity which could be vastly disproportionate to the original aggravation. The use of ICBMs and SLBMs is not, therefore, a rational or credible response to provocations which, although serious, are still less than an immediate threat to national survival. For this reason, among others, I consider that the national security will continue to require the flexibility, responsiveness, and discrimination of manned strategic weapon systems throughout the range of cold, limited, and general war."

=== Vietnam War ===
LeMay's dislike for tactical aircraft and training foreshadowed events in the low-intensity conflict of Vietnam, where existing Air Force fighter aircraft and standard attack profiles proved incapable of carrying out sustained tactical bombing campaigns in the face of hostile North Vietnamese anti-aircraft defenses. LeMay said, "Flying fighters is fun. Flying bombers is important." Aircraft losses on tactical attack missions soared, and Air Force commanders soon realized that their large, missile-armed jet fighters were exceedingly vulnerable not only to antiaircraft shells and missiles but also to cannon-armed, maneuverable Soviet fighters.

LeMay advocated a sustained strategic bombing campaign against North Vietnamese cities, harbors, ports, shipping, and other strategic targets. His advice was ignored. Instead, an incremental policy, Operation Rolling Thunder, was implemented that focused on limited interdiction bombing of fluid enemy supply corridors in Vietnam; two similar incremental policies, Operation Barrel Roll and Operation Steel Tiger, focused on Laos. This limited campaign failed to destroy significant quantities of enemy war supplies or diminish enemy ambitions. Bombing limitations were imposed by U.S. President Lyndon B. Johnson for geopolitical reasons, as he surmised that bombing Soviet and Chinese ships in port and killing Soviet advisers would bring the Soviets and Chinese more directly into the war.

In his 1965 autobiography (co-written with MacKinlay Kantor), LeMay is quoted as saying his response to North Vietnam would be to demand that "they've got to draw in their horns and stop their aggression, or we're going to bomb them back into the Stone Age. And we would shove them back into the Stone Age with Air power or Naval power—not with ground forces." LeMay subsequently rejected misquotes of the famous "Stone Age" quote. Later, in a Washington Post interview LeMay said that "I never said we should bomb them back to the Stone Age. I said we had the capability to do it. I want to save lives on both sides."

Some military historians have argued that LeMay's theories were eventually proven correct. Near the war's end in December 1972, U.S. President Richard Nixon ordered Operation Linebacker II, a high-intensity Air Force, Navy and Marine Corps aerial bombing campaign, which included hundreds of B-52 bombers that struck previously untouched North Vietnamese strategic targets, including heavily populated areas in Hanoi and Haiphong. Linebacker II was followed by renewed negotiations that led to the Paris Peace Agreement, appearing to support the claim. However, consideration must be given to significant differences in terms of both military objectives and geopolitical realities between 1968 and 1972, including the impact of Nixon's recognition and exploitation of the Sino-Soviet split to gain a "free hand" in Vietnam and the shift of Communist opposition from an organic insurgency (the Viet Cong) to a conventional mechanized offensive that was by its nature more reliant on industrial output and traditional logistics. In effect, Johnson and Nixon were waging two different wars.

== Post-military career ==
=== Early political life and developments ===
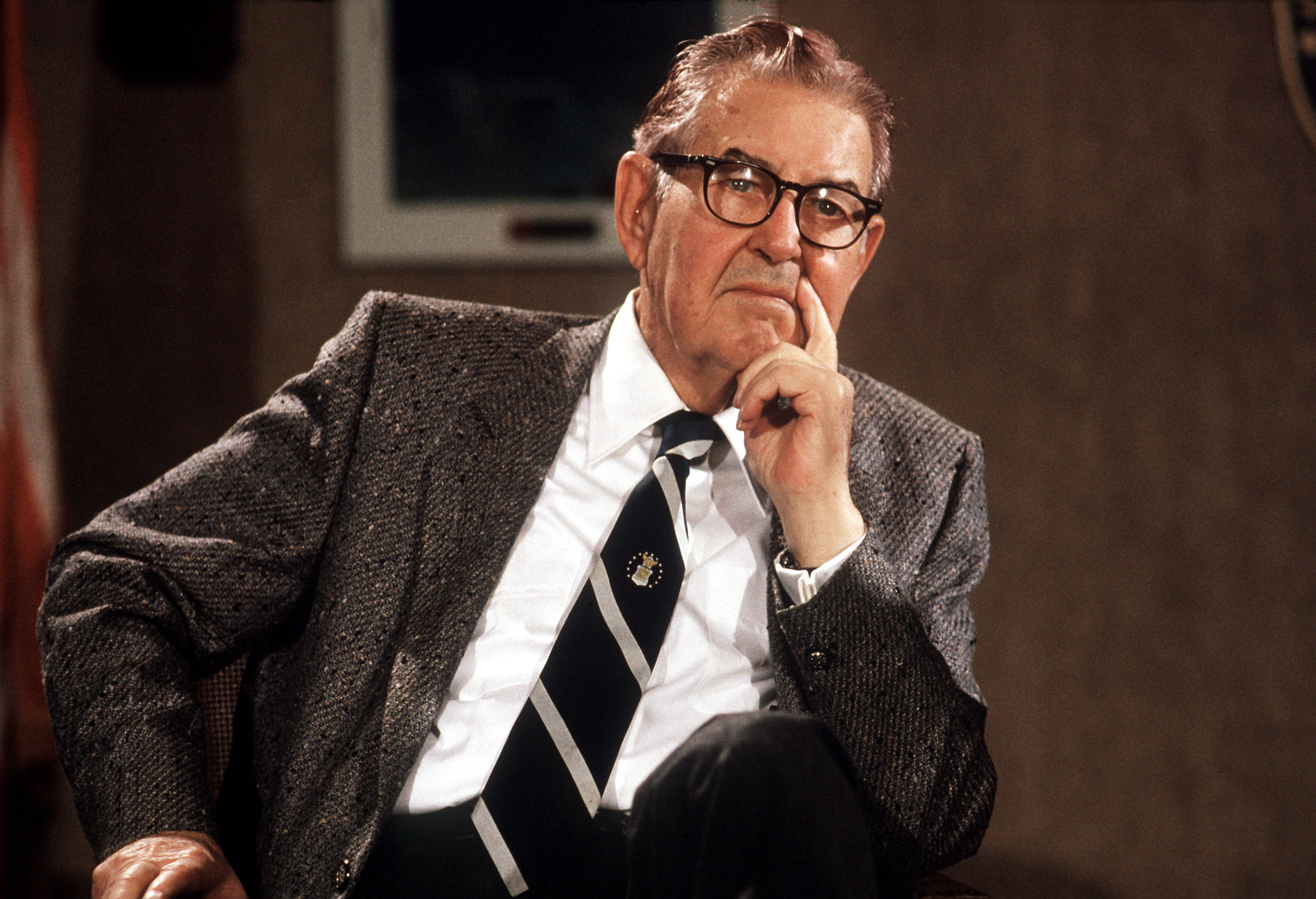
LeMay in 1987

Because of his unrelenting opposition to the Johnson administration's Vietnam policy and what was widely perceived as his hostility to McNamara, LeMay was essentially forced into retirement in February 1965. Moving to California, he was approached by conservatives to challenge moderate Republican Thomas Kuchel for his seat in the United States Senate in 1968, but he declined.

=== Vice presidential candidacy, 1968 ===
For the 1968 presidential election, LeMay originally supported former Republican Vice President Richard Nixon; he turned down two requests by former Alabama Governor George Wallace to join his newly formed American Independent Party, that year, on the grounds that a third-party candidacy might hurt Nixon's chances at the polls. (By coincidence, Wallace had served as a sergeant in a unit commanded by LeMay during World War II before LeMay had Wallace transferred to the 477th Bombardment Group.)

In 1968, LeMay threw his support to Wallace and became his vice-presidential running mate on the American Independent Party ticket. The campaign saw Wallace's record on racial segregation heavily scrutinized.

Wallace's staff began to consider LeMay to be "politically tone-deaf" as LeMay made several comments at campaign events speculating about the possibility of nuclear war, including the press conference where Wallace introduced LeMay as his running mate, where LeMay voiced his belief that there were many situations where the use of nuclear weapons would be efficient and that dropping nuclear bombs would result in positive outcomes for the environment. LeMay's arguments that the American public had a "phobia" of atomic weapons failed to change the perception that some American voters had of the Wallace-LeMay ticket.

The Wallace-LeMay American Independent Party (AIP) ticket received 13.5% of the popular vote, higher than most third party candidacies in the United States, and carried five states for a total of 46 electoral votes.

=== Honors ===
LeMay was honored by several countries for his military service. His U.S. military decorations included the Distinguished Service Cross, the Distinguished Service Medal with two oak leaf clusters, the Silver Star, the Distinguished Flying Cross with two oak leaf clusters, and the Air Medal with three oak leaf clusters. He was also a recipient of the French Légion d'honneur and on December 7, 1964 the Japanese government conferred on him the First Order of Merit with the Grand Cordon of the Order of the Rising Sun. He was elected to the Alfalfa Club in 1957 and served as a general officer for 21 years.

In 1977, LeMay was inducted into the International Air & Space Hall of Fame at the San Diego Air & Space Museum.

The United States Air Force has the General Curtis E. LeMay Award named in his honor. The award recognizes the best large installation-level Force Support Squadron.

== Personal life ==
On June 9, 1934, LeMay married Helen Estelle Maitland (died 1992), with whom he had one child.

LeMay was also initiated to the York Rite Freemasonry, in the Lakewood Lodge No. 601 of Lakewood, Ohio.

== Death ==
LeMay resided in Newport Beach, California, starting in 1969. In 1989, he moved to Air Force Village West, a retirement community for former Air Force officers near March Air Force Base (AFB) in Riverside. LeMay died on October 1, 1990, from complications of a heart attack, in the 22nd Strategic Hospital on the grounds of March AFB. He is buried in the United States Air Force Academy Cemetery at Colorado Springs, Colorado.

== Miscellaneous ==
=== Amateur radio operator ===
LeMay was a Heathkit customer and active amateur radio operator and held a succession of call signs; K0GRL, K4FRA, and W6EZV. He held these calls respectively while stationed at Offutt AFB, Washington, D.C., and when he retired in California. K0GRL is still the call sign of the Strategic Air Command Memorial Amateur Radio Club. He was famous for being on the air on amateur bands while flying on board SAC bombers. LeMay became aware that the new single sideband (SSB) technology offered a big advantage over amplitude modulation (AM) for SAC aircraft operating long distances from their bases. In conjunction with Heath engineers and Arthur A. Collins (W0CXX) of Collins Radio, he established SSB as the radio standard for SAC bombers in 1957.

=== Sports car racing ===
LeMay was also a sports car owner and enthusiast who owned an Allard J2. As the "SAC era" began to wind down, LeMay loaned out facilities of SAC bases for use by the Sports Car Club of America (SCCA), as the era of early street races began to die out. Turner Air Force Base hosted the first SCCA race on a military installation in 1952, while SAC's operating base at Offutt welcomed the SCCA National Sports Car Championship the following year. LeMay was not permitted to race himself, so he allowed those like SCCA president Fred Wacker and Roy Scott to drive his Allard when the association raced at Offutt. Revenue from the races were used to improve living quarters at the bases or donated to the Air Force Aid Society and local charities. Racing at SAC installations ended in 1954 after a Congressional investigation over using public funding to organize the events.

LeMay was awarded the Woolf Barnato Award, SCCA's highest award, for contributions to the Club in 1954. LeMay was inducted into the Nebraska Auto Racing Hall of Fame in 2004 and the SCCA Hall of Fame in 2007.

=== Air Force Academy exemplar ===
LeMay was named the class exemplar for the United States Air Force Academy class of 2013 on March 13, 2010.

=== Executive Jet Aviation pioneer ===
In 1964, LeMay became one of the founding board members of Executive Jet Aviation (EJA) (now called NetJets), along with fellow USAF generals Paul Tibbets and Olbert Lassiter, Washington lawyer, former military pilot and future Rhode Island governor Bruce Sundlun, and entertainers James Stewart (who was also an Air Force general in the reserves) and Arthur Godfrey. It was the first private business jet charter and aircraft management company in the world.

=== Judo ===
Judo's resurgence after the war was due primarily to two individuals, Kyuzo Mifune and LeMay. The prewar death of Jigorō Kanō ("the father of judo"), wartime demands on the Japanese, their surrender, postwar occupation, and the martial-arts ban all contributed to a time of uncertainty for judo. As assistant to General Douglas MacArthur during the occupation of Japan, LeMay made practicing judo a routine part of Air Force tours of duty in Japan. Many Americans brought home stories of a "tiny old man" (Mifune) throwing down healthy, young men without any apparent effort. LeMay became a promoter of judo training and provided political support for judo in the early years after the war. For this, he was awarded the license of Shihan. In addition, LeMay promoted judo within the armed forces of the United States.

== Rank history ==
Training and cadet ranks

LeMay held the following ranks over the course of his United States Air Force career. LeMay's first contact with military service occurred in September 1924 when he enrolled as a student in the Army ROTC program at Ohio State University. By his senior year, LeMay was listed on the ROTC rolls as a "cadet lieutenant colonel." On June 14, 1928, the summer before the start of his senior year, LeMay accepted a commission as a second lieutenant in the Field Artillery Reserve of the United States Army. In September 1928, LeMay was approached by the Ohio National Guard and asked to accept a state commission, also as a second lieutenant, which LeMay accepted.

LeMay enlisted in the Army Air Corps as an aviation cadet on September 29, 1928. For the next thirteen months, he was on the enlisted rolls of the Regular Army as a cadet and he held commissions in the National Guard and Army Reserve. His status changed on October 2, 1929, when LeMay's Guard and Reserve commissions were terminated. These commissions were revoked after an Army personnel officer, realizing that LeMay was holding officer and enlisted status simultaneously, called him to discuss the matter and LeMay verbally resigned these commissioned ranks over the telephone.

| Local insignia | Army ROTC cadet: September 1924 |
| | Second lieutenant, Field Artillery Reserve: June 14, 1928 |
| | Second lieutenant, Ohio National Guard: September 22, 1928 |
| No insignia | Flight cadet, Army Air Corps: September 28, 1928 |

All officer commissions were terminated on October 2, 1929, pending completion of flight training and commissioning as an officer in the Army Air Corps.

Commissioned ranks

On October 12, 1929, LeMay finished his flight training and was commissioned a second lieutenant in the Army Air Corps Reserve. This was the third time he had been appointed a second lieutenant in just under two years. He held this reserve commission until June 1930, when he was appointed as a Regular Army officer in the Army Air Corps.

LeMay experienced slow advancement throughout the 1930s, as did most officers of the seniority-driven Regular Army. At the start of 1940 he was promoted to captain after serving nearly eleven years in the lieutenant grades. Beginning in 1941, LeMay began to receive temporary advancements in grade in the expanding Army Air Forces and advanced from captain to brigadier general in less than four years; by 1944, he was a major general in the Army Air Forces. When World War II ended, he was appointed to the permanent rank of brigadier general in the Regular Army and then promoted to permanent major general rank (two star) when the United States Air Force became its own separate branch of service. LeMay was simultaneously appointed to temporary three star general rank in the Air Force and promoted to the full rank of general, permanent in the Air Force, in 1951. LeMay held this rank until his retirement in 1965. He was the youngest ever to achieve the rank of four stars (at age 44). He was noted for this quote (when firing a subordinate): "I can't tell if you are inept or unfortunate – but I don't have time for either one."

| Second lieutenant, Air Corps Reserve: October 12, 1929 |
| Second lieutenant, Army Air Corps: February 1, 1930 |
| First lieutenant, Army Air Corps: March 12, 1935 |
| Captain, Army Air Corps: January 26, 1940 |
| Major, Army Air Corps: March 21, 1941 |
| Lieutenant colonel, Army of the United States: January 23, 1942 |
| Colonel, Army of the United States: June 17, 1942 |
| Brigadier general, Army of the United States: September 28, 1943 |
| Major general, Army of the United States: March 3, 1944 |
| Brigadier general, Regular Army: June 22, 1946 |
| Major general, Air Forces of the United States: September 18, 1947 |
| Lieutenant general, Air Forces of the United States: January 26, 1948 |
| Major general, United States Air Force: February 19, 1948 |
| General, United States Air Force: October 29, 1951 |

Curtis E. LeMay retired from the United States Air Force on February 1, 1965, with the rank of full (four star) general.

Further promotions

According to letters in LeMay's service record, while he was in command of SAC during the 1950s several petitions were made by United States Air Force service members to have LeMay promoted to the rank of General of the Air Force (five stars). The Air Force leadership, however, felt that such a promotion would lessen the prestige of this rank, which was seen as a wartime rank to be held only in times of extreme national emergency.

Per the chief of the Air Force General Officers Branch, in a letter dated February 28, 1962:

It is clear that a grateful nation, recognizing the tremendous contributions of the key military and naval leaders in World War II, created these supreme grades as an attempt to accord to these leaders the prestige, the clear-cut leadership, and the emolument of office befitting their service to their country in war. It is the conviction of the Department of the Air Force that this recognition was and is appropriate. Moreover, appointments to this grade during periods other than war would carry the unavoidable connotation of downgrading of those officers so honored in World War II.

Thus, no serious effort was ever made to promote LeMay to the rank of General of the Air Force, and the matter was eventually dropped after his retirement from active service in 1965.

== Awards and decorations ==
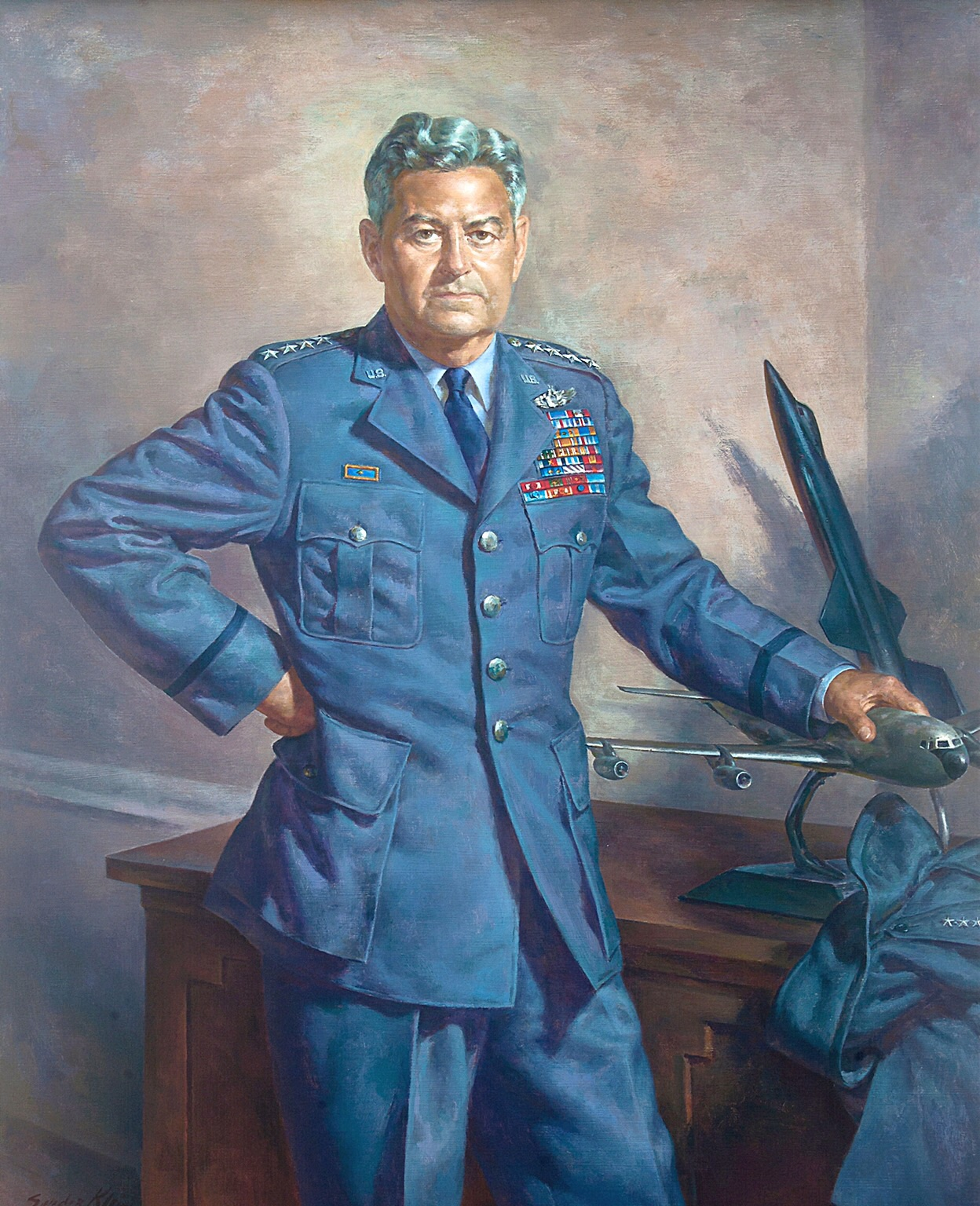
Official portrait of United States Air Force Chief of Staff General LeMay by Sandor Klein

LeMay received recognition for his work from thirteen countries, receiving two badges and thirty-two different medals and decorations.

United States

- Command pilot
- Distinguished Service Cross
- Distinguished Service Medal plus 2 oak leaf clusters
- Silver Star
- Distinguished Flying Cross plus 2 oak leaf clusters
- Air Medal plus 4 oak leaf clusters
- Presidential Unit Citation plus oak leaf cluster
- American Defense Service Medal
- American Campaign Medal
- European-African-Middle Eastern Campaign Medal plus 3 bronze campaign stars
- Asiatic-Pacific Campaign Medal plus 4 bronze campaign stars
- World War II Victory Medal
- Army of Occupation Medal with Berlin Airlift Device
- Medal for Humane Action
- National Defense Service Medal with one service star
- Armed Forces Expeditionary Medal
- Vietnam Service Medal
- Air Force Longevity Service Award, 8 oak leaf clusters

Other countries

- United Kingdom Distinguished Flying Cross
- Order of the Patriotic War First Class (Union of Soviet Socialist Republics)
- Legion of Honour (Commandeur) (France)
- French Croix de Guerre with silver Palm
- Belgian Croix de Guerre, with silver Palm
- Ecuador – Order of Aeronautical Merit (Knight Commander)
- Brazilian Order of Aeronautical Merit, Commander
- Moroccan Order of Ouissam Alaouite, Commander
- Argentina – Order of May of Aeronautical Merit – Grades of Grand Cross and Grand Commander
- Brazilian Order of the Southern Cross, Grand Cross
- Japanese Order of the Rising Sun, Grand Cordon
- Swedish Commander Grand Cross of the Royal Order of the Sword
- Chile – Order of Merit (degree unknown)
- Chile – Medalla Militar de Primera Clase
- Uruguay – Aviador Militar Honoris Causa (Piloto Comandante)

In 1972, LeMay was inducted into the National Aviation Hall of Fame in Dayton, Ohio.

=== Distinguished Service Cross citation ===

LeMay, Curtis E.
Brigadier General (then Colonel), U.S. Army Air Forces
4th Bomb Wing, Eighth Air Force
Date of Action: August 17, 1943

Citation:

The President of the United States of America, authorized by Act of Congress July 9, 1918, takes pleasure in presenting the Distinguished Service Cross to Brigadier General [then Colonel (Air Corps)] Curtis Emerson LeMay, United States Army Air Forces, for extraordinary heroism in connection with military operations against an armed enemy while serving as Pilot of a B-17 Heavy Bomber and Commander of the 4th Bomb Wing, Eighth Air Force, while participating in a bombing mission on 17 August 1943, against enemy ground targets in the European Theater of Operations. General LeMay, fully realizing the extent of the hazards involved, although not required to participate through obligation or reason of duty, undertook the responsibility of directing this mission. In spite of heavy enemy fighter attack and antiaircraft fire, General LeMay led the formation to target, accomplished his mission, and led the return to a friendly base. His courage, coolness, and skill on this occasion were an inspiration to his men and reflect great credit upon himself, the 8th Air Force, and the United States Army Air Forces.

== Works ==
=== Books ===
- LeMay, Curtis; Kantor, MacKinlay (1965), Mission with LeMay: My Story, Doubleday, B00005WGR2.
- LeMay, Curtis; Smith, Dale O. (1968), America is in Danger, Funk & Wagnalls, B00005VCVX.
- LeMay, Curtis; Yenne, William 'Bill' (1988), Superfortress: The Story of the B-29 and American Air Power, McGraw-Hill, ISBN 0-07-037160-1.

=== Film and television appearances ===
- The Last Bomb (documentary, 1945)
- In the Year of the Pig (documentary, 1968)
- The World at War (documentary TV series, 1974)
- Reaching for the Skies (documentary TV series, 1988)
- Race for the Superbomb (documentary, 1999)
- JFK (film, 1991; featured in archival footage)
- Roots of the Cuban Missile Crisis (documentary, 2001)
- The Fog of War: Eleven Lessons from the Life of Robert S. McNamara (documentary, 2003)
- DC3:ans Sista Resa (Swedish documentary, 2004)

== Cultural legacy ==
According to Michael S. Sherry, "Few American military officers of this century have been more feared, reviled, and ridiculed than Curtis E. LeMay." According to Fred Kaplan:

Dr. Strangelove, Stanley Kubrick's 1964 film about nuclear-war plans run amok, is widely heralded as one of the greatest satires in American political or movie history. ... It was no secret—it would have been obvious to many viewers in 1964—that General Ripper looked a lot like Curtis LeMay, the cigar-chomping, gruff-talking general."

University of Notre Dame professor Dan Lindley points out parallels between LeMay and the characters of Buck Turgidson and Jack D. Ripper in Stanley Kubrick's Dr. Strangelove, including close paraphrasing of statements by LeMay.

Fletcher Knebel and Charles W. Bailey II, authors of the novel Seven Days in May (later to be a 1964 film starring Kirk Douglas), conducted interviews with LeMay who was angry with President John F. Kennedy for refusing to provide air support for the Cuban rebels in the Bay of Pigs Invasion. The character of General James Mattoon Scott was believed to have been inspired by both LeMay and General Edwin Walker.

John Milius wrote a script about LeMay's life for American filmmaker Robert Zemeckis, but as of 2025 it has not been filmed.

In his 2021 book, The Bomber Mafia, Malcolm Gladwell writes about the relationship between Lemay and Haywood Hansel; contrasting both their characters and tactics in warfare.

== Public buildings ==
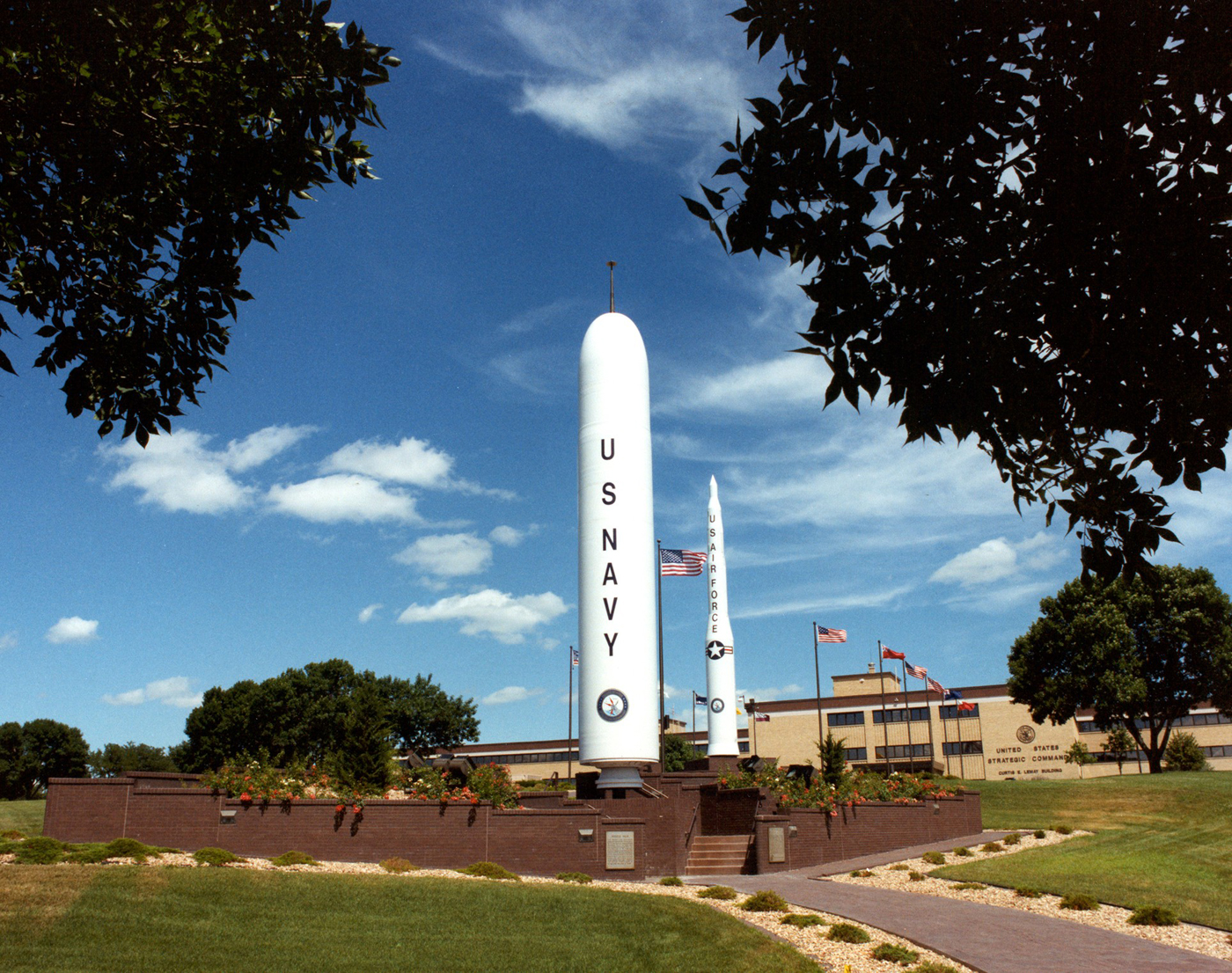
Gen. Curtis E. LeMay Building, U.S. Strategic Command Headquarters

- The headquarters building of U.S. Strategic Command at Offutt AFB in Nebraska is named for the general. It was erected in the late 1950s and was the headquarters of the Strategic Air Command until its disbandment in 1992.
- LeMay Elementary School opened in 1968 in the Capehart housing area of Offutt AFB and is operated by the Bellevue Public Schools.

== See also ==
- List of commanders of USAFE
- List of commanders-in-chief of the Strategic Air Command

Military offices
| Preceded by George Kenney | Commander-in-Chief of the Strategic Air Command; 1948–1957 | Succeeded by Thomas Power |
| Preceded by Thomas White | Vice Chief of Staff of the Air Force; 1957–1961 | Succeeded by Frederic Smith |
| Preceded by Thomas White | Chief of Staff of the Air Force; 1961–1965 | Succeeded by John McConnell |
Party political offices
| New political party | American Independent nominee for Vice President of the United States; 1968 | Succeeded by Thomas Anderson |
