= The Enemy Within (1994 film) =

1994 American television film

- Genre: Thriller
- Based on: Seven Days in May by Rod Serling; Seven Days in May by; Fletcher Knebel; Charles W. Bailey II
- Screenplay by: Darryl Ponicsan; Ron Bass
- Directed by: Jonathan Darby
- Starring: Forest Whitaker; Sam Waterston; Dana Delany; Jason Robards; Josef Sommer; Dakin Matthews; William O'Leary
- Music by: Joe Delia
- Country of origin: United States
- Original language: English

Production
- Executive producer: Peter Douglas
- Producer: Robert A. Papazian
- Cinematography: Kees Van Oostrum
- Editor: Peter Zinner
- Running time: 86 minutes
- Production companies: HBO Pictures; Papazian-Hirsch Entertainment International; Vincent Pictures

Original release
- Network: HBO
- Release: August 20, 1994

The Enemy Within is a 1994 American political thriller television film directed by Jonathan Darby and written by Darryl Ponicsan and Ron Bass. It is a remake of the 1964 film Seven Days in May, itself based on a 1962 novel, and stars Forest Whitaker, Jason Robards, Jr., Dana Delany and Sam Waterston. The film involves a planned military coup to overthrow the President of the United States. The television film remake was originally announced in 1984, while producer Peter Douglas (son of Kirk Douglas, star of the original film) worked for his father's film production company The Bryna Company (which had produced Seven Days in May). The film took ten years to develop and was finally produced in 1994 through Peter Douglas' own film production company, Vincent Pictures. It aired on HBO on August 20, 1994.

== Plot summary ==
U.S. Marine Colonel Lyle MacArthur "Mac" Casey discovers an apparent plan by Chairman of the Joint Chiefs of Staff General R. Pendleton Lloyd and Secretary of Defense Charles Potter to remove President William Foster from office and replace him with Vice President Walter Kelly, who they feel would be more willing to do their bidding.

Casey and Foster desperately seek evidence before the coup occurs. They encounter a setback when Attorney General Arthur Daniels (who has told Potter about his misgivings about the constitutionality of the plan) is murdered. Casey contacts long time acquaintance Betsy Corcoran, who is Foster's Chief of Staff, and is able to secretly bring his concerns to Foster.

With only a few days left until the coup, Casey receives unexpected support from "Jake", a Russian operative able to supply the kind of satellite and photographic proof that Foster cannot risk requesting of anyone in the compromised US intelligence community. When Jake provides access to Sarah McCann, secretary to the murdered Daniels and secretly a Russian agent, Lloyd's operatives assassinate her.

When all else fails, with troops deployed in 12 major cities and Lloyd and Potter in the Oval Office demanding Foster's resignation, Casey advises that he will confess to being part of their conspiracy (having uncovered enough information to sound legitimate in his so-called confession), denying the true conspirators any chance of claiming that they have acted within the Constitution.

Lloyd resigns, and Foster tells Potter that he and that other conspirators will simply resign in stages over the coming year, in order to prevent knowledge of, and a panic regarding, their treasonous acts.

== Cast ==
- Forest Whitaker as Colonel Lyle MacArthur "Mac" Casey
- Sam Waterston as President William Foster
- Dana Delany as Betsy Corcoran
- Jason Robards as General R. Pendleton Lloyd
- Josef Sommer as Defense Secretary Charles Potter
- George Dzundza as Jake
- Isabel Glasser as Sarah McCann
- Dakin Matthews as Vice President Walter Kelly
- William O'Leary as Lieutenant William Dorsett
- Lisa Summerour as Jean Casey
- Ray J as Todd Casey
- Denise Dowse as Dr. Jarvis

== Production ==
In March 1994, it was reported Jonathan Darby would be directing a re-adaptation of Seven Days in May from writers Darryl Ponicsan and Ron Bass for HBO.

== Reception ==
Ken Parish Perkins of the Chicago Tribune stated "Messiness aside, "The Enemy Within" offers more good acting than most TV movies, particularly from ever-consistent Whitaker, Robards and Waterston."
