= Paul Greengrass' unrealized projects =

During his long career, British filmmaker Paul Greengrass has worked on several projects which never progressed beyond the pre-production stage under his direction. Some of these projects fell in development hell, were officially canceled, were in development limbo or would see life under a different production team.

== 2000s ==
=== Birdsong ===
On August 18, 2002, Greengrass was in talks to direct the film adaptation of Sebastian Faulks’ WW1 romance novel Birdsong, with Rick Jaffa and Amanda Silver writing the script and Working Title Films set to distribute.

=== Cross Town Traffic ===
As early as the 2003, Greengrass had been developing a biopic about Jimi Hendrix. On February 19 of that year, it was reported that he was set to direct the film, with financing from the UK Film Council. Greengrass continued to develop the project until 2010, when it was announced that it had been stalled over objections from the Hendrix estate. At this time, Max Borenstein was writing the screenplay and Anthony Mackie was set to star in the role, for Legendary Pictures. On May 7, 2015, it was announced that the project was back in development, with Experience Hendrix now on board with the project, Scott Silver set to write the screenplay, and no actor attached to play Hendrix.

=== They Marched into Sunlight ===
On January 31, 2005, Greengrass was hired to direct and write the feature film adaptation of David Maraniss’ non-fiction book They Marched into Sunlight, with Playtone producing and Universal Pictures set to distribute.

=== The Trial of the Chicago 7 ===
On August 11, 2008, it was reported via an issue of Production Weekly that Greengrass had taken over the directing position of The Trial of the Chicago 7 from Steven Spielberg. By July 24, 2013, Greengrass was officially set to direct the film with Scott Rudin producing alongside Thomas Augsberger, and DreamWorks Pictures set to distribute. However, in September of that same year, Greengrass dropped out and scribe Aaron Sorkin would ultimately direct the film himself.

=== Blackbeard ===
On September 27, 2008, it was reported that DreamWorks Pictures' planned Blackbeard project was moving forward with Greengrass "leading the short list of candidates to direct." The script was written by David Franzoni, and was set to be set to be a fairly realistic, R-rated portrayal of real-life buccaneer Edward Teach.

== 2010s ==
=== Fantastic Voyage remake ===
On March 31, 2010, Greengrass was set to direct a 3-D remake of Fantastic Voyage for 20th Century Fox, with Shane Salerno writing the screenplay and James Cameron set to produce through Lightstorm Entertainment. On May 19 of that same year, Greengrass dropped out of the project.

=== Treasure Island ===
On May 19, 2010, Greengrass was hired to direct an adaptation of Robert Louis Stevenson’s novel Treasure Island with Lionel Wigram producing for Warner Bros., but the project never materialized.

=== Untitled Civil War crossover film ===
Also in 2010, Greengrass was in talks to direct a Marvel Comics crossover film for 20th Century Fox with Zack Stentz and Ashley Edward Miller writing a screenplay loosely based on the comic book Civil War that would feature X-Men, Fantastic Four, Daredevil and Deadpool, but Stentz revealed that the project was put on hold indefinitely due to scheduling conflicts and the success of X-Men: First Class.

=== Cleopatra ===
In 2011, Greengrass was offered to direct the 3D feature film adaptation of Stacy Schiff's novel Cleopatra: A Life with Brian Helgeland writing the screenplay, Angelina Jolie portraying Cleopatra, and Scott Rudin producing for Columbia Pictures, but by September 2017, Denis Villeneuve was in talks to direct the project with Helgeland, Eric Roth, and David Scarpa having contributed to the screenplay, Jolie's involvement being up in the air, and Rudin and Amy Pascal producing the film for Columbia.

=== Memphis ===
On January 12, 2011, Greengrass was set to direct and write Memphis, about the assassination of Martin Luther King Jr., with Scott Rudin producing and Focus Features distributing. In April of that same year, Universal canceled the project. On November 23, it was reported that Access Industries' Icon UK outfit were in talks to back the project. On November 16, 2012, it was reported that Greengrass and Rudin had revived the project, with Wild Bunch and Veritas Films in talks to finance the project.

=== The Boy Who Kicked the Hornet's Nest ===
On February 2, 2011, Greengrass was rumored to direct the feature film adaptation of Bill Keller's article about Julian Assange, "The Boy Who Kicked the Hornet's Nest", with Mark Boal writing the screenplay and Megan Ellison producing through Annapurna Pictures in collaboration with Management 360.

=== The Deep Blue Good-by ===
On April 25, 2011, following the postponement of his MLK biopic Memphis, the frontrunner for his next project was said to be the novel The Deep Blue Good-by by John D. MacDonald. The project, set up at 20th Century Fox, was being written by Dana Stevens and Kario Salem, with Peter Chernin, Leonardo DiCaprio, Amy Robinson, and Jennifer Davisson-Killoran set to produce. Ultimately, Greengrass did not come aboard the project, with James Mangold instead signing on to direct in March 2014; the project would ultimately be shelved by Fox in August 2015 due to star Christian Bale's knee injury.

=== Here There Be Monsters ===
Also on April 25, 2011, Greengrass was reported to be one of several directors being considered to direct Here There Be Monsters, a fictionalized story centred on Scottish-American naval officer John Paul Jones being written by Brian Helgeland for Legendary Pictures, but on July 26, 2011, Robert Zemeckis got the offer instead of Greengrass.

=== Rush ===
On June 2, 2011, it was reported that Greengrass was in talks to direct Rush, a biographical sports film written by Peter Morgan about the Hunt-Lauda rivalry during the 1976 Formula One season, and an untitled thriller about the Maersk Alabama hijacking for Sony Pictures, later titled Captain Phillips. Greengrass would ultimately choose to direct Captain Phillips, while Ron Howard would sign on to direct Rush by late June 2011, with the film being released in the United States on September 20, 2013.

=== The Fear Index ===
On August 25, 2011, Greengrass was set to direct a film adaptation of Robert Harris' novel The Fear Index with Peter Chernin, Dylan Clark and Jenno Topping producing, and 20th Century Fox distributing. The novel was eventually adapted into a television miniseries without Greengrass’ involvement.

=== Untitled CIA drama TV series ===
On November 17, 2011, Greengrass was set to executive produce Joe Weisberg's CIA drama series with Brian Grazer producing through Imagine Entertainment and Fox set to air the series.

=== Barca documentary ===
On May 17, 2012, Greengrass was going to direct Barca, a documentary about FC Barcelona, with Richard Brown and John Carlin producing through Anonymous Content.

=== Untitled crime film ===
On November 28, 2012, Greengrass was set to direct and produce an untitled crime script by Chris Terrio for Columbia Pictures, with George Clooney producing and set to star.

=== The Director ===
On January 15, 2014, Greengrass was set to direct and write the feature film adaptation of David Ignatius’s novel The Director for Columbia Pictures, with Michael De Luca, Scott Rudin, and Hannah Minghella set to produce.

=== Agent Storm ===
On July 28, 2014, Greengrass was set to direct and potentially write the film adaptation of Paul Cruickshank and Tim Lister's novel Agent Storm about Morgen Storm's troubled youth to Islamic Radical and CIA double-agent in Yemen, with Scott Rudin producing.

=== Richard Jewell ===
On September 10, 2014, it was announced that Greengrass had entered talks to direct a film centered around Richard Jewell for 20th Century Fox, based on the Vanity Fair article "The Ballad of Richard Jewell" and adapted by Billy Ray. Jonah Hill and Leonardo DiCaprio were set to star in the project as Jewell and his lawyer, respectively. The film was eventually released on December 13, 2019, by Warner Bros. Pictures, with Clint Eastwood directing and Paul Walter Hauser starring as Jewell.

=== The Tunnels ===
On October 24, 2014, Greengrass was hired to direct the feature film adaptation of Greg Mitchell’s non-fiction book The Tunnels, with Mark Gordon producing the film with FilmNation. On September 22, 2015, Tobias Lindholm was hired to write the screenplay for the project.

=== 1984 ===
On November 19, 2014, Greengrass was set to direct and produce a new feature film adaptation of George Orwell’s novel 1984, with James Graham writing the screenplay, Scott Rudin and Gina Rosenblum set to produce and Columbia Pictures distributing. In April 2017, it was reported that Graham and Greengrass were rewriting the screenplay in the wake of the 2016 United States presidential election and presidency of Donald Trump. In February 2020, Graham revealed the project had been shelved after he and Greengrass found it difficult to write the screenplay.

=== The Corporation ===
On April 7, 2016, Greengrass, Scott Rudin and Amy Pascal had reportedly entered a bidding war for the film adaptation of T. J. English's historical novel The Corporation, a fictionalized story centered on Cuban exile Jose Miguel Battle Sr., but gave up over the price of the rights.

=== Ness ===
On March 27, 2017, Greengrass was set to direct Ness, a film adaptation of Brian Michael Bendis and Marc Andreyko’s graphic novel Torso, and adapted by Brian Helgeland about Eliot Ness' investigation into the Cleveland Torso Murderer; Greengrass would also produce the film alongside Bendis, Andreyko, John Davis, Greg Goodman, John Fox, and David Engel, with Paramount Pictures was set to distribute. On May 8, 2018, it was announced that Paramount had abandoned the film, and would let the rights revert back to Bendis and Andreyko, and on October 20, 2022, Corin Hardy was attached to direct the film adaptation.

== 2020s ==
=== Night of Camp David ===
On April 15, 2021, Greengrass was set to direct a feature film adaptation of Fletcher Knebel’s novel Night of Camp David for Universal Pictures, with Jed Mercurio writing the screenplay and Greengrass producing alongside Gregory Goodman.

=== Fairy Tale TV series ===
On September 15, 2022, Greengrass was set to direct and write the feature film adaptation of Stephen King’s novel Fairy Tale, with Greg Goodman producing with Greengrass. On October 6, it was announced that Universal Pictures had acquired the distribution rights. On October 16, 2024, it was announced that the book would instead be developed as a ten-episode television series by A24, with Greengrass serving as executive producer alongside King, Peter Rice, and J. H. Wyman, who was also expected to serve as showrunner; Greengrass was also in negotiations to direct.

=== Drowning ===
On November 28, 2023, Greengrass was hired to write and direct Warner Bros.' film adaptation of Drowning: The Rescue of Flight 1421 by T. J. Newman. On March 26, 2024, it was announced that Steve Kloves was set to adapt the novel, after Greengrass chose to direct The Lost Bus instead.

=== Test Drive ===
In March 2026, it was reported that Greengrass was in negotiations to helm the 20th Century Studios thriller Test Drive as his next project after delivering The Lost Bus to critical acclaim the previous fall. The studio acquired the spec script from writer Matt Venne and was hoping to begin production by late 2026 or early 2027. The script originally appeared on The Black List in 2024. By October, Greengrass exited the film after failing to land A-list talent, including Timothée Chalamet and Michael B. Jordan, for the two leads.

=== The Uprising sequel ===
In September 2026,
