= Night of Camp David =

1965 novel

- Author: Fletcher Knebel
- Language: English
- Publisher: Harper & Row
- Publication date: 1965
- Publication place: United States
- Media type: Print (hardcover)
- Pages: 336 pp.

Night of Camp David is a 1965 American political thriller novel by Fletcher Knebel, co-author of Seven Days in May. It spent 18 weeks on the bestseller list in 1965.

In November, 2018, Vintage Books announced that it was re-releasing the book.

== Plot ==
Iowa Senator Jim MacVeagh is summoned to Camp David by US President Mark Hollenbach. MacVeagh, who is expected to become Hollenbach's next Vice President, becomes concerned because Hollenbach shows signs of intense paranoia. He erratically expresses his desire to develop a closer relationship between the United States and the Soviet Union, and attempts to cut ties with US allies in Europe. Hollenbach believes the US news media are conspiring against him. MacVeagh is the only person who notices that Hollenbach's mind is crumbling, as the presidential advisors and politicians he attempts to warn ignore him. The sole person in possession of evidence of Hollenbach's mental decline is his mistress, Rita. Hollenbach puts both MacVeagh and Rita under an FBI investigation.

== Reception ==
In 1965, in a book review in The New York Times, novelist David Dempsey described Night of Camp David as “too plausible for comfort.”

Tom Nichols points out clear differences between the fictional and the historical president threatening military and economic force against allies to form a new union.

== Film adaptation ==
In 2021, it was reported that Paul Greengrass was set to direct and produce a film adaptation of the novel for Universal Pictures.

== See also ==
- 25th amendment
