= Herman Taller =

American obstetrician and low-carbohydrate diet writer

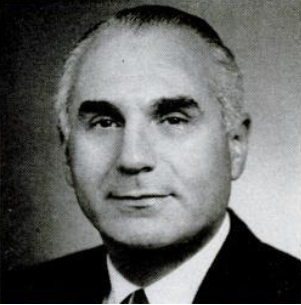
- Born: 5 May 1906; Baia de Aramă
- Died: June 1984 (aged 78); Warsaw
- Occupations: Obstetrician, writer

Herman Taller (5 May 1906, Baia de Aramă – June 1984, Warsaw, Poland) was a Romanian-born American obstetrician who advocated weight loss based on a low-carbohydrate diet with polyunsaturated fats including safflower oil. He was the author of the controversial best selling book, Calories Don't Count which made false health claims.

== Biography ==
Taller worked as a obstetrician and gynaecologist in New York. He was influenced by the low-carbohydrate dietary ideas of Alfred W. Pennington. In the early 1960s he developed a low-carbohydrate diet consisting of several high-fat meals a day such as red meat, fried chicken and mayonnaise with a high-dose of polyunsaturated fat in the form of safflower oil capsules which he argued would stimulate the pituitary gland to burn off fat at a faster rate. This idea has no scientific basis and was widely criticized by medical experts as dangerous. Taller promoted his low-carbohydrate diet in his 1961 book Calories Don't Count, which is cited by historians as an example of a fad diet.

Taller argued that pyruvic acid from the breakdown of carbohydrates inhibits the body from burning stored fat and then becomes fat so carbohydrates in the diet should be restricted whilst fat and protein are encouraged in high amounts.

== Fraud ==
The FDA charged that the 1961 book, which cited a specific source of safflower oil capsules in the first printings, existed solely to promote the sales of safflower oil capsules.

In 1962, FDA Commissioner George P. Larrick commented: "This bestselling book was deliberately created and used to promote these worthless safflower oil capsules for the treatment of obesity, cardiovascular diseases and other serious conditions. One of its main purposes was to promote the sale of a commercial product in which Dr. Taller had a financial interest." To this, his publisher Simon & Schuster replied: "There is nothing in the record which could possibly support these vicious and irresponsible innuendoes." The FDA's Larrick went further: "The book is full of false ideas, as many competent medical and nutritional writers have pointed out. Contrary to the book's basic premise, weight reduction requires the reduction of caloric intake. There is no easy, simple substitute. Unfortunately, calories do count."

Despite this, the book sold more than two million copies. Later, after a trial, and an unfavourable appeal on the confusion of the jury instructions about misdemeanors, Taller was found guilty of mail fraud and conspiracy in 1967, fined $7000, placed on probation for two years, and sentencing suspended on some charges. In later editions of Taller's book, the safflower oil capsules were not mentioned.

== Selected publications ==
- Calories Don't Count (Simon & Schuster, 1961)
