= Seven Days in May =

1964 political thriller film directed by John Frankenheimer

- Theatrical release poster
- Directed by: John Frankenheimer
- Screenplay by: Rod Serling
- Based on: Seven Days in May; 1962 novel by Fletcher Knebel; Charles W. Bailey II
- Produced by: Edward Lewis
- Starring: Burt Lancaster; Kirk Douglas; Fredric March; Ava Gardner; Edmond O'Brien; Martin Balsam
- Cinematography: Ellsworth Fredricks A.S.C.
- Edited by: Ferris Webster
- Music by: Jerry Goldsmith
- Production companies: Seven Arts Productions; Joel Productions Inc.; John Frankenheimer Productions; Cayuga Productions
- Distributed by: Paramount Pictures
- Release dates: February 12, 1964 (Washington, DC)
- Running time: 118 minutes
- Country: United States
- Language: English
- Budget: $2.2 million
- Box office: $3,650,000 (rentals)

Seven Days in May is a 1964 American political thriller film, directed by John Frankenheimer and written by Rod Serling, who adapted Fletcher Knebel and Charles W. Bailey II's 1962 novel. It is about a military–political cabal's planned takeover of the U.S. government after the president negotiates a disarmament treaty with the Soviet Union. The film stars Burt Lancaster, Kirk Douglas, Fredric March, and Ava Gardner.

Seven Days in May was released in theaters by Paramount Pictures on February 12, 1964. The film received two nominations at the 37th Academy Awards: Edmond O'Brien for Best Supporting Actor along with Cary Odell and set decorator Edward G. Boyle for Best Art Direction (Black-and-White).

== Plot ==
In the near future of 1970 during the Cold War, President of the United States Jordan Lyman signs a nuclear disarmament treaty with the Soviet Union, provoking widespread opposition from political opponents and military leaders who distrust the Soviets. As Lyman's approval ratings plummet, violent protests erupt outside the White House. His physician also warns him of a serious heart condition and prescribes a two-week vacation, but Lyman, preoccupied with the mounting crisis, disregards the advice.

Colonel Martin "Jiggs" Casey, the Director of the Joint Chiefs of Staff, learns that his superior, the highly decorated Air Force general James Mattoon Scott, is planning a coup d'etat with the Joint Chiefs. Disguised as a training exercise, the plan involves a secret army unit known as ECOMCON training at a secret Texas base, which will take control of the country's telephone, radio, and television networks and seize the president while he participates in a staged "alert". Scott, advancing his charismatic public persona through nationally televised anti-treaty rallies, will replace the president as head of a military junta. Although personally opposed to Lyman's policies, Casey is appalled by the plot and alerts Lyman.

A skeptical Lyman gathers a circle of trusted advisors to investigate. Casey deduces the heads of all military branches but the Navy support Scott's coup, and Vice Admiral Barnswell, aboard an aircraft carrier in the Mediterranean, is apparently the only invited officer to decline. Lyman rescinds his commitment to participate in Scott's alert, pretending he will be away for a fishing weekend, then dispatches his Chief of Staff Paul Girard to Gibraltar to obtain Barnswell's confession. The alcoholic Senator Raymond Clark, Lyman's close friend of 21 years, goes to Texas to locate the secret base, and tasks Casey to gather dirt on the general's private life. The Secret Service surreptitiously films evidence of an attempt to kidnap the president during the phony fishing trip, removing all doubts about the existence of a plot.

Girard successfully secures Barnswell's written confession, which is lost when he's killed in a plane crash in Spain. Clark is taken captive when he reaches the secret base and held incommunicado. Exploiting their longtime friendship, Clark convinces the base's deputy commander Colonel Henderson of the actual intent of the impending "alert". Henderson frees Clark and leads an escape back to Washington but is abducted and confined in a military stockade. In a radiophone conference call with the president, Barnswell denies knowledge of any conspiracy.

Knowing he can't prove Scott's guilt, Lyman calls him to the White House to demand the conspirators resign. Scott refuses, denying the existence of a plot. Afterwards Lyman argues that a coup would prompt the Soviets to launch a preemptive nuclear strike and Scott maintains the American people are behind him. Lyman challenges him to resign and run for office in order to seek power legitimately, but Scott is unmoved. Lyman restrains himself from confronting Scott with damning letters that Casey had obtained from Scott's former mistress Eleanor Holbrook. Casey, who has his own romantic interest in Holbrook, eventually returns them to her.

Scott meets the other three Joint Chiefs, reasserts his intention to execute the coup, and plans a nighttime network broadcast, but Lyman plans an afternoon press conference to announce the firing of the four men. As the presser begins, Barnswell's confession, recovered from the plane crash, is handed to him and he pauses the proceeding to give time for copies of the confession to be delivered to Scott and the plotters. Scott, devastated, abandons the plan and returns home as Lyman announces the resignation of the other three conspirators on live air.

Lyman delivers a speech on the state of the nation and its values, declaring that the nation gains strength through peace rather than by conflict. The press corps applauds.

== Cast ==
- Burt Lancaster as US Air Force General James Mattoon Scott, Chairman of the Joint Chiefs of Staff
- Kirk Douglas as USMC Colonel Martin "Jiggs" Casey, Director of the Joint Staff
- Fredric March as US President Jordan Lyman
- Ava Gardner as Eleanor Holbrook
- Edmond O'Brien as US Senator Ray Clark
- Martin Balsam as Paul Girard, White House Chief of Staff
- Andrew Duggan as Colonel "Mutt" Henderson, friend of Jiggs Casey
- Hugh Marlowe as Harold McPherson, TV commentator
- Whit Bissell as US Senator Fred Prentice
- Helen Kleeb as Esther Townsend, secretary to the president
- George Macready as Chris Todd, Secretary of the Treasury
- Richard Anderson as Colonel Ben Murdock, aide to Scott
- Bart Burns as Art Corwin, head of Secret Service

=== Uncredited speaking roles (in order of appearance) ===
- Malcolm Atterbury — Horace, the president's physician: "Why, in God's name, do we elect a man president and then try to see how fast we can kill him?"
- Jack Mullaney — "All properly decoded in four point oh fashion and respectfully submitted by yours truly, Lieutenant junior grade Dorsey Grayson."
- Charles Watts — Stu Dillard, Washington insider: "Oh, Senator, pardon me, come along, I want you to meet the wife of the Indian ambassador."
- John Larkin — Colonel John Broderick, one of the conspirators: "Well, well, well, if it isn't my favorite jarhead himself, Jiggs Casey."
- Colette Jackson — bar girl speaking to Senator Clark in Charlie's Bar, near secret base in Texas: "You wonder what the country's comin' to. All those boys sittin' up in the desert never seein' no girls. Why, they might as well be in stir."
- John Houseman — Vice Admiral Farley C. Barnswell, defaulted conspirator: "I'm sorry, sir. I can only recount to you the situation as it occurred. I signed no paper. He took nothing with him."
- Rodolfo Hoyos Jr. — Captain Ortega, in charge of the airplane crash site in Spain: "There were only two American nationals on board — a Mrs. Agnes Buchanan from Philadelphia, Pennsylvania and a Mister Paul Girard. His destination was Washington."
- Fredd Wayne — Henry Whitney, official from the American embassy in Spain: "You find any effects of the Americans? Anything at all?"
- Tyler McVey — General Hardesty, Air Force Chief of Staff: "Barney Rutkowski, Air Defense. He's screaming bloody murder about those twelve troop carriers dispatched to El Paso."
- Ferris Webster (editor of Seven Days in May) — General Barney Rutkowski, NORAD commander: "There's some kind of a secret base out there, Mr. President, and I think I should have been notified of it."

== Production ==
=== Background ===
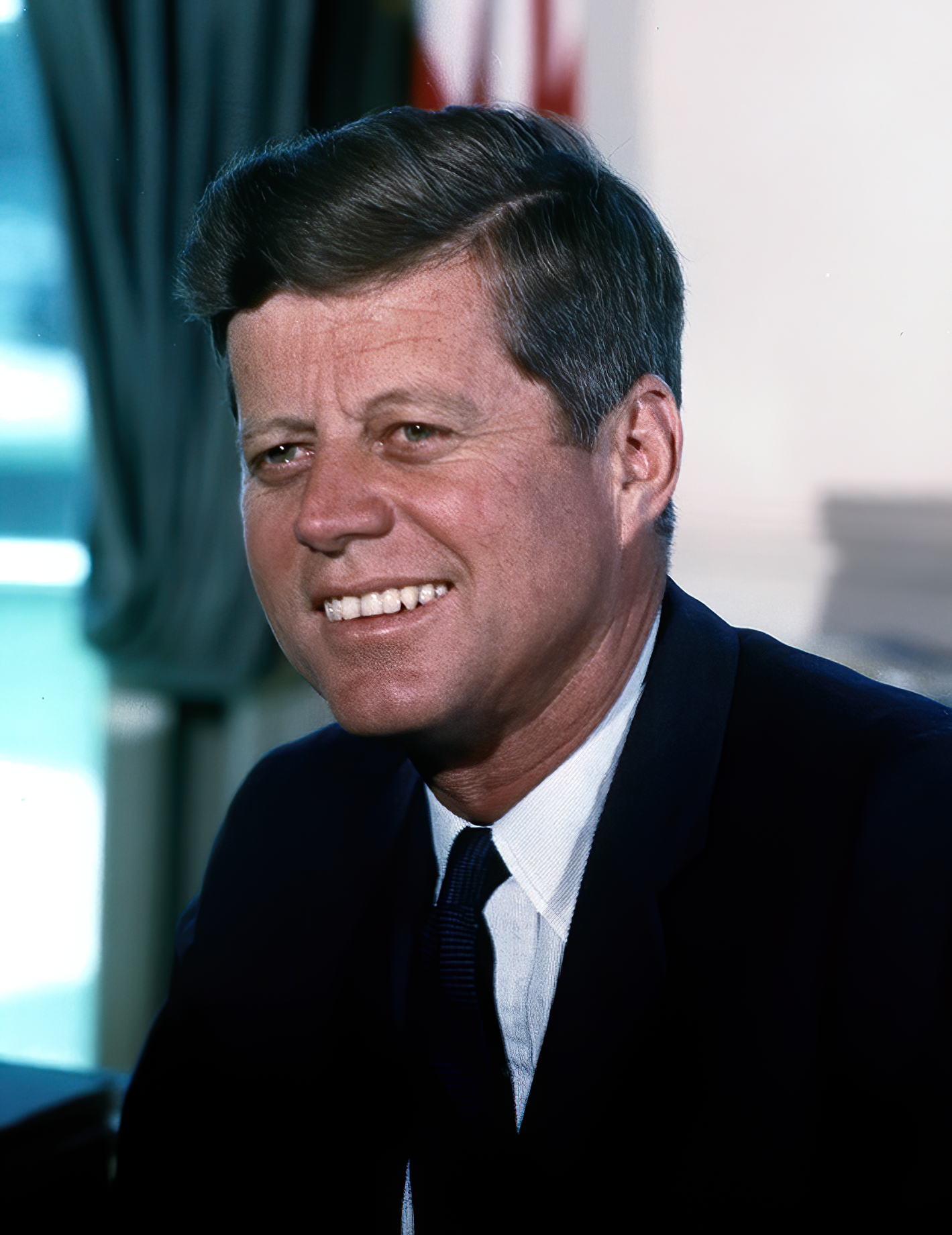
President John F. Kennedy believed the events of the novel Seven Days in May could happen in real life, and wished for it to be adapted as a film.

Fletcher Knebel and Charles W. Bailey II wrote the novel Seven Days in May in late 1961 and into early 1962 during the first year of the Kennedy administration; it reflected some of the events of that era. In November 1961, President John F. Kennedy accepted the resignation of vociferously anti-communist general Edwin Walker, who had been indoctrinating the troops under his command with radical right-wing ideas and personal political opinions, including describing Harry S. Truman, Dean Acheson, Eleanor Roosevelt, and other active public figures as communist sympathizers. Although no longer in uniform, Walker continued to make headlines as he ran for governor of Texas and made speeches promoting strongly right-wing views. In the film, President Jordan Lyman mentions General Walker as one of the "false prophets" who were offering themselves to the public as leaders.

During the time that Knebel and Bailey, who were primarily political journalists, collaborated on the novel, they also conducted interviews with another highly controversial military commander, the newly appointed Air Force chief of staff General Curtis LeMay, who was angry with Kennedy for refusing to provide air support for the Cuban rebels in the Bay of Pigs Invasion. The character of General Scott was believed to have been inspired by both LeMay and Walker.

President Kennedy had read Seven Days in May shortly after its publication and believed that the scenario could actually occur. He told Paul B. Fay that the premise of the novel was "possible, but the conditions would have to be just right". According to director John Frankenheimer, the project received encouragement and assistance from Kennedy through White House press secretary Pierre Salinger, who conveyed Kennedy's wish that the film be produced. In spite of Defense Department opposition, Kennedy arranged to visit the Kennedy Compound in Hyannis Port for a weekend when the film needed to shoot outside the White House. Kennedy aide Arthur Schlesinger Jr. said that he wanted the film made as a "warning to the nation".

=== Development ===
Kirk Douglas and Frankenheimer were the moving forces behind the filming of Seven Days in May, which was produced by Edward Lewis through Douglas's company Joel Productions and Seven Arts Productions. Frankenheimer recruited screenwriter Rod Serling. Douglas intended to star along with his frequent costar Burt Lancaster. Douglas offered Lancaster the General Scott role, and agreed to play Scott's assistant. Frankenheimer commissioned Nedrick Young to rewrite the scene in which Casey visits Holbrook at her apartment.

Lancaster's involvement nearly caused Frankenheimer to withdraw from the project, as the two men had conflicts during the production of Birdman of Alcatraz two years earlier. Only Douglas's assurances that Lancaster would behave kept Frankenheimer on the project. Lancaster and Frankenheimer were at peace during the filming, but Douglas and Frankenheimer sparred with one another. Frankenheimer was very happy with Lancaster's performance, especially the long scene toward the end between Lancaster and March, saying that Lancaster was "perfect" in his delivery. Frankenheimer stated decades later that he considered Seven Days in May among his most satisfying work, which put a "nail in the coffin of McCarthy."

=== Filming ===
Filming took 51 days and was a happy affair, according to Frankenheimer, with the cast and crew displaying great reverence for Fredric March. Many of Lancaster's scenes were shot at a later time as he was recovering from hepatitis. Ava Gardner, whose scenes were shot in just six days, thought that Frankenheimer favored the other actors over her. Frankenheimer remarked that she was sometimes "difficult." Martin Balsam objected to Frankenheimer's habit of shooting pistols behind him during important scenes. Frankenheimer had been briefly stationed in the mailroom at the Pentagon early in his Korean war service and stated that the sets were totally authentic, praising the production designer. Further providing authenticity, many of the scenes in the film were loosely based on real-life events of the Cold War.

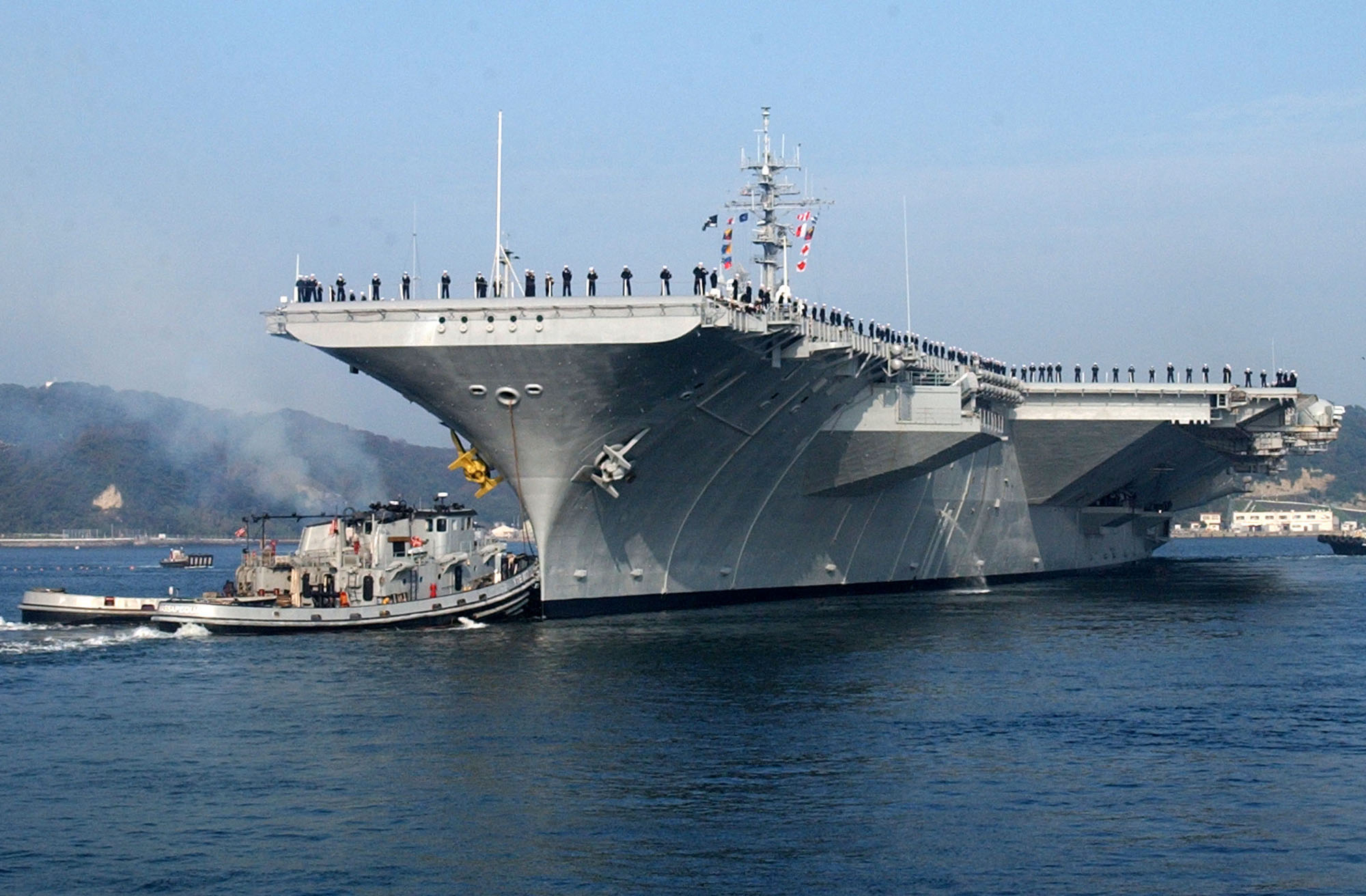
Supercarrier Kitty Hawk in 2002

In an early example of guerrilla filmmaking, Frankenheimer photographed Balsam ferrying to the supercarrier USS Kitty Hawk in San Diego without prior permission. Another example occurred when Frankenheimer wanted a shot of Douglas entering the Pentagon, but unable to receive permission, he rigged a camera in a parked car. Frankenheimer recruited well-known producer and friend John Houseman to play Vice Admiral Farley C. Barnswell in his uncredited acting debut. Houseman agreed in return for a bottle of fine wine (seen during the telephone scene).

Several scenes, including one with standins for nuns, were shot inside the recently built Washington Dulles International Airport, and the production team was the first to ever film there. The alley and car-park scene was shot in Hollywood, and other footage was shot in the Californian desert in 110-degree heat. The secret base and airstrip were specially built in the desert near Indio, California, and an aircraft tail was used in one shot to create the illusion of a whole plane off screen. The original script had Lancaster dying in a car crash at the end after hitting a bus, but this was dropped in favor of a scene showing him leaving for home in his limousine, a scene that was shot in Paris during production of The Train (1964). President Kennedy arranged a visit to the family compound in Hyannis Port one weekend so that the riot scene could be filmed outside the White House.

Frankenheimer considered the scene in which Douglas's character visits the president to be a masterful bit of acting which would have been very difficult for most actors to sustain. He had done similar scenes on many television shows, and not only the acting but also every camera angle and shot were extensively planned and rehearsed. Frankenheimer paid particular attention to ensuring that all three actors in the scene were in focus for dramatic impact. Many of Frankenheimer's signature techniques were used in scenes such as this throughout the film, including his "depth of focus" shot with one or two people near the camera and another or others in the distance and the "low angle, wide-angle lens" (set at f/11) which he considered to give "tremendous impact" on a scene.

Seven Days in May is set several years in the future from the time of its release. Although "1970" appears on a Pentagon display and the registration sticker on the rear license plate of Senator Prentice's Bentley sedan, the day/date indicator in the Pentagon depicts "Tues / May 13", a date occurring only in such post-1964 years as 1969, 1975, 1980 or 1986. Other nods include a situation room which was designed to seem futuristic, as well as the use of then-futuristic technology of video teleconferencing and the recently issued and exotic-looking M16 rifle. Additionally, the concept of a nuclear treaty between Cold War powers anticipated the actual existence of one.

=== Score ===
David Amram, who had previously scored Frankenheimer's The Manchurian Candidate (1962), originally provided music for the film, but Lewis was unsatisfied with his work. Jerry Goldsmith, who had worked with the producer and Douglas on Lonely Are the Brave (1962) and The List of Adrian Messenger (1963), was signed to rescore the project. Goldsmith composed a very brief score (lasting around 15 minutes) using only pianos and percussion. In 2013, Intrada Records released Goldsmith's music for the film on a limited-edition CD—paired with Maurice Jarre's score for The Mackintosh Man, although that film was produced by Warner Bros. while Seven Days in May was theatrically released by Paramount. The entire Seven Arts Productions library had been acquired by Warner Bros. back in 1967.

== Reception ==
Seven Days in May premiered on February 12, 1964, in Washington, D.C., to positive critical notices and audience response.

=== Critical response ===
The New York Times review was approving: “As a matter of fact, there is a great deal about this ‘Seven Days in May’ that is rousing and encouraging to a feeling of confidence and pride—and this is in addition to the feelings of tension and excitement it stirs. Considerably more than melodrama and sensationalism are contained in its not too far-fetched speculations. There is, in its slick dramatic frame, a solid base for respect for democracy and the capacities of freedom-loving men....The whole thing achieves a tingling speed and irresistable tension under John Frankenheimer’s direction, which deftly lifts some of the tricks of pictorial and musical emphasis from the old Nazi ‘Blitzkreig’ films. It gathers a sense of actuality and plausibility (except for one twist; that is the supposition of a giant secret military base). And it is expertly played. Fredric March’s performance as the President is the firmest and the best....Kirk Douglas is sturdy and valiant...and Burt Lancaster is impressively forceful.....Balsam...O’Brien...Gardner...and Whit Bissell...are among the several excellent performers of secondary roles.”

The Chicago Tribune was very positive: “a suspense thriller, a patriotic cheer, and a shocker, all at the same time. It is a taut melodrama of a battle of wits fought for the highest stakes….Its plot may seem preposterous at first glance, but as it unreels, it is with a chilling indication that such coup really could be possible. Most viewers will find themselves inwardly shaken….There’s precious little humor in ‘Seven Days in May.’ There is a great absence of love scenes. The grim tale is told in old-fashioned black and white. But there is more merit in this movie than in 98 out of 100.”

On review aggregator Rotten Tomatoes, the film holds a 92% approval rating based on 25 critic reviews. The website's critics consensus reads, "John Frankenheimer's striking direction and a first-rate cast conspire to make Seven Days in May a stark, riveting tale of political intrigue." Metacritic, which uses a weighted average, assigned the film a score of 73 out of 100, based on 6 critics, indicating "generally favorable" reviews.

=== Evaluation in film guides ===
Steven H. Scheuer's Movies on TV (1972–73 edition) gives Seven Days in May its highest rating of four stars, recommending it as "an exciting suspense drama concerned with politics and the problems of sanity and survival in a nuclear age", with the concluding sentences stating, "benefits from taut screenplay by Rod Serling and the direction of John Frankenheimer, which artfully builds interest leading to the finale. March is a standout in a uniformly fine cast. So many American-made films dealing with political subjects are so naive and simple-minded that the thoughtful and, in this case, the optimistic statement of the film is a welcome surprise." By the 1986–87 edition, Scheuer's rating was lowered to 3½ and the conclusion shortened to, "which artfully builds to the finale", with the final sentences deleted.

Leonard Maltin's TV Movies & Video Guide (1989 edition) gives it a lower 3 stars (out of 4), originally describing it as an "absorbing story of military scheme to overthrow the government", with later editions (including 2014) adding one word, "absorbing, believable story..."

Videohound's Golden Movie Retriever follows Scheuer's later example, with 3½ bones (out of 4), calling it a "topical but still gripping Cold War nuclear-peril thriller" and, in the end, "highly suspenseful, with a breathtaking climax."

Mick Martin's & Marsha Porter's DVD & Video Guide also puts its rating high, at 4 stars (out of 5) finding it, as Videohound did, "a highly suspenseful account of an attempted military takeover..." and indicating that "the movie's tension snowballs toward a thrilling conclusion. This is one of those rare films that treat their audiences with respect."

Assigning the equally high rating of 4 stars (out of 5), The Motion Picture Guide begins its description with "a taut, gripping, and suspenseful political thriller which sports superb performances from the entire cast", goes to state, in the middle, that "proceeding to unravel its complicated plot at a rapid clip, SEVEN DAYS IN MAY is a surprisingly exciting film that also packs a grim warning", and ends with "Lancaster underplays the part of the slightly crazed general and makes him seem quite rational and persuasive. It is a frightening performance. Douglas is also quite good as the loyal aide who uncovers the fantastic plot that could destroy the entire country. March, Balsam, O'Brien, Bissell, and Houseman all turn in topnotch performances and it is through their conviction that the viewer becomes engrossed in this outlandish tale."

British references also show high regard for the film, with TimeOut Film Guide's founding editor Tom Milne indicating that "conspiracy movies may have become more darkly complex in these post-Watergate days of Pakula and paranoia, but Frankenheimer's fascination with gadgetry (in his compositions, the ubiquitous helicopters, TV screens, hidden cameras and electronic devices literally edge the human characters into insignificance) is used to create a striking visual metaphor for control by the military machine. Highly enjoyable." In his Film Guide, Leslie Halliwell provided 3 stars (out of 4), describing it as an "absorbing political mystery drama marred only by the unnecessary introduction of a female character. Stimulating entertainment." David Shipman in his 1984 The Good Film and Video Guide gives 2 (out of 4) stars, noting that it is "a tense political thriller whose plot is plotting".

=== Awards and nominations ===
The film was nominated for two 1965 Academy Awards, for Edmond O'Brien for Best Actor in a Supporting Role, and for Best Art Direction-Set Decoration/Black-and-White for Cary Odell and Edward G. Boyle. In that year's Golden Globe Awards, O'Brien won for Best Supporting Actor, and Fredric March, John Frankenheimer, and composer Jerry Goldsmith received nominations.

Frankenheimer won a Danish Bodil Award for directing the Best Non-European Film, and Rod Serling was nominated for a Writers Guild of America Award for Best Written American Drama.

== Remake ==
The film was remade in 1994 by HBO as The Enemy Within with Sam Waterston as President William Foster, Jason Robards as General R. Pendleton Lloyd, and Forest Whitaker as Colonel MacKenzie "Mac" Casey. This version followed many parts of the original plot closely, while updating it for the post–Cold War world, omitting certain incidents and changing the ending.

== Bibliography ==
- Bamford, James (2001). "Chapter 4: Fists". Body of Secrets: Anatomy of the Ultra-Secret National Security Agency: From the Cold War Through the Dawn of a New Century. New York: Doubleday. pp. 80–91. ISBN 978-0-385-49907-1. OCLC 44713235. Covers an actual plot during the Kennedy administration and within the Joint Chiefs of Staff to start a war.
