= Seven Days in May (novel) =

1962 thriller novel by Fletcher Knebel and Charles W. Bailey II

- Cover of first edition
- Author: Fletcher Knebel and Charles W. Bailey II
- Language: English
- Publisher: Harper & Row
- Publication date: 1962
- Publication place: United States
- Media type: Print (hardcover)
- Pages: 342 pp.

Seven Days in May is an American political thriller novel by Fletcher Knebel and Charles W. Bailey II, first published in hardcover by Harper & Row in 1962.

The plot concerns an attempted military coup in the United States.

== Reception ==
The book was a great success and was number one on The New York Times bestseller list for the weeks of November 18, 1962; December 2–9, 1962; and March 3, 1963. (The weeks of December 16 to February 24 were not listed because of the 1962–63 New York City newspaper strike.)

== Awards ==
The novel was nominated for the 1989 Prometheus Hall of Fame Award.

== Adaptations ==
The novel has twice been adapted for the screen, as Seven Days in May (1964), starring Burt Lancaster, Kirk Douglas, and Fredric March; and as The Enemy Within (1994), starring Forest Whitaker, Sam Waterston, and Jason Robards.

It also inspired the Soviet television miniseries The Conspiracy (1971) and The Last Argument of Kings (1983).

== See also ==
- Mount Weather, which was mentioned in the novel
- Patriot Freeway, which was formerly the 'War road' (the dirt road mentioned at the beginning of the novel)
