= Charles W. Bailey II =

American journalist, newspaper editor and novelist

Charles W. Bailey
- Born: Charles Waldo Bailey II; April 28, 1929; Boston, Massachusetts, U.S.
- Died: January 3, 2012 (aged 82); Englewood, New Jersey, U.S.
- Education: Harvard University
- Occupations: Journalist; newspaper editor; novelist
- Notable work: Seven Days in May

Charles Waldo Bailey II (April 28, 1929 – January 3, 2012) was an American journalist, newspaper editor and novelist.

Born in Boston, Massachusetts, the son of John Washburn Bailey and Catherine (née Smith), he graduated from Harvard University in 1950. He then worked for the Minneapolis Tribune, serving as its editor from 1972 to 1982. Bailey co-wrote, with Fletcher Knebel, the best-selling political thriller novel Seven Days in May (1962), and several other novels. He died in Englewood, New Jersey.
