= Fletcher Knebel =

American writer

- Born: October 1, 1911; Dayton, Ohio
- Died: February 26, 1993 (aged 81); Honolulu, Hawaii
- Education: Miami University, Oxford, Ohio
- Writing career
- Notable work: Seven Days in May

Fletcher Knebel (October 1, 1911 – February 26, 1993) was an American author of several popular works of political fiction.

Knebel was born in Dayton, Ohio, but relocated a number of times during his youth. He graduated from high school in Yonkers, New York, spent a year studying at the University of Paris and graduated from Miami University in Oxford, Ohio during 1934. Upon graduation, he received a job offer from the newspaper Coatesville Record of Coatesville, Pennsylvania. He spent the next 20 years working for newspapers, eventually becoming the political columnist for Cowles Publications. Knebel served in the United States Navy during World War II, attaining the rank of lieutenant. From 1951 to 1964, he satirized national politics and government in a nationally published column named "Potomac Fever".

During 1960, he wrote a chapter on John F. Kennedy for the book Candidates 1960. This seemed to begin a passion for writing books, and he went on to write fifteen, most of them fiction, and all of them dealing with politics, intrigue and social upheaval. His best-known novel is Seven Days in May (1962, co-authored with Charles W. Bailey), about an attempted military coup in the United States. The book was a great success, reaching number one on the New York Times bestseller list, and was made into a successful movie also named Seven Days in May during 1964. Knebel has been described as one of the "founding fathers" of the political thriller genre, and Seven Days in May has been described as an inspiration for a long list of fictional presidents, including television shows such as The West Wing. In 2000, during the Bush v. Gore election dispute, the political situation was compared to the uncertainty in Knebel's Seven Days in May.

Generally, Knebel's works are products of the times during which they were produced. For instance, the delegate in Convention changes her vote after learning that the candidate she had originally favored is using a computer to track personal information about the delegates. Vanished involved concerns about superpower nuclear proliferation during the Cold War. Trespass concerns black militancy of the type that largely ended during the late 1970s.

Knebel was also a staunch liberal who was "suspicious of the size and power of the American military" and intelligence community, as he wrote in Dark Horse; many of his novels represented that opinion. In 2025, his paranoid thriller book Night of Camp David was described as paralleling the second presidency of Donald Trump.

He is the source of the quote: "Smoking is one of the leading causes of statistics."

== Personal life ==
Knebel was married four times from 1935 to 1985. The first two marriages ended in divorce, his third wife died in 1982, and his fourth wife survived him. He had one son.

Towards the end of his life, he had cancer. He died at home in Honolulu, Hawaii in 1993. The cause of death was suicide.

== Bibliography ==
- Seven Days in May (1962), described above.
- Convention (1964), also written with Charles Bailey, about a woman from the Midwest United States who serves as a delegate at a major political convention.
- Night of Camp David (1965), about a President of the United States who may be insane.
- The ZinZin Road (1966), about Peace Corps workers in Africa caught in an incipient revolution.
- Vanished (1968), about the political effects of the sudden, mysterious disappearance of the main aide to the President of the United States during a contentious re-election campaign.
- Trespass (1969), about black militants occupying homes owned by rich Caucasians and demanding that title be given to the militants as the beginning of the creation of a black nation in the American South.
- Dark Horse (1972), about a minor official chosen to replace a Presidential candidate who died shortly before the election.
- Poker Game (1973), a story set in the world of computers.
- The Bottom Line (1974), a novel about a business company convention and a man who found there's also a bottom line in private lives.
- Dave Sulkin Cares! (1978), a story of love between two con artists, Gail and Johnny.
- Crossing in Berlin (1981), about an American man assisting an East German woman escape from East Germany.
- Sabotage (1986), about sabotage of oil tankers by Japanese organized crime mobsters.
