= 1962 in literature =

This article contains information about the literary events and publications of 1962.

== Events ==
- January 7 – In an article in The New York Times Book Review, Gore Vidal calls Evelyn Waugh "our time's first satirist".
- February 17 – Arthur Miller marries photographer Inge Morath.
- February 28 – F. R. Leavis delivers the Richmond lecture Two Cultures? The Significance of C. P. Snow at Downing College, Cambridge, which arouses controversy.
- May 11 – The Finnish Ministry of Education forbids the import and distribution of eight children's books (including Alice's Adventures in Wonderland), published by Kynäbaari, because of the poor quality and clandestine abridgement of the translations.
- May – Joe Orton and Kenneth Halliwell are prosecuted and jailed for defacing library books in London.
- June 5 – Marvel Comics publishes Amazing Fantasy #15, featuring the debut of its Spider-Man feature by Stan Lee (writer) and Steve Ditko (artist). In numerous interviews, Lee will recall how the title had been slated for cancellation, and so with nothing to lose, publisher Martin Goodman reluctantly agreed to allow Lee to introduce Spider-Man, a new kind of superhero – one who would be a teenager, but not a sidekick, and who would have everyman doubts, neuroses and money problems. While this is indeed the final issue, its editorial page anticipates the comic continuing and that "the Spiderman [sic] ... will appear every month in Amazing". The Amazing Spider-Man periodical series begins publication in December. The ongoing series starts with a cover date of March 1963. By focusing on Peter Parker's everyday problems, Lee and Ditko create a groundbreakingly flawed, self-doubting superhero, and the first major teenaged superhero to be a protagonist and not a sidekick. Ditko's quirky art provides a stark contrast to the more cleanly dynamic stylings of Marvel's most prominent artist, Jack Kirby.
- June 30 – The works of Pierre Teilhard de Chardin are denounced by the Roman Catholic Church.
- July – The General Law Amendment Act in South Africa denies freedom of speech to opposition activists and writers.
- September – Ted Hughes and Sylvia Plath separate. From the beginning of the following month, Plath experiences a burst of creativity, writing in the last few months of her life most of the poems on which her reputation will rest. They include many that will appear in Ariel and Winter Trees. On October 31, Heinemann in London publish The Colossus which will be the only collection of her poems published in her lifetime under her own name. In December she moves to a London flat in a house where W. B. Yeats lived as a boy.
- November – Aleksandr Solzhenitsyn's novella One Day in the Life of Ivan Denisovich (Russian: Оди́н день Ива́на Дени́совича, Odin den' Ivana Denisovicha), the author's semi-autobiographical account of life in the gulag, is published in Novy Mir in an unprecedented acknowledgement of the Soviet Union's Stalinist past.
- December – L. Frank Baum's short story "The Tiger's Eye" appears for the first time nearly 60 years after it was written.
- December 4 – A tape-recorded conversation on science fiction takes place between Kingsley Amis, C. S. Lewis and Brian Aldiss in Lewis's rooms at Cambridge.
- unknown dates
  - Richard Booth opens a second-hand bookshop at the old fire station in the future "bookshop town" of Hay-on-Wye in Wales.
  - Lynne Reid Banks goes to live in a kibbutz in Israel.
  - George Oppen publishes his first collection of poetry since Discrete Series in 1934, breaking a 28-year silence. He goes on to win the Pulitzer Prize in 1969.
  - A parallel text edition of George Bernard Shaw's play Androcles and the Lion is published posthumously by Penguin Books in the UK, as the first published work in the phonetic Shavian alphabet devised by Ronald Kingsley Read.

== New books ==
=== Fiction ===
- Kōbō Abe – The Woman in the Dunes
- H. G. Adler – Eine Reise (A Journey)
- Nelson Algren (editor) – Nelson Algren's Own Book of Lonesome Monsters: 13 Masterpieces of Black Humor (anthology)
- Eric Ambler – The Light of Day
- Isaac Asimov, editor – The Hugo Winners
- James Baldwin – Another Country
- J. G. Ballard – The Drowned World
- William Barrett – Lilies of the Field
- Giorgio Bassani – The Garden of the Finzi-Continis (Il giardino dei Finzi-Contini)
- Thomas Berger – Reinhart in Love
- Jorge Luis Borges – Ficciones (The Garden of Forking Paths and Artifices translated by Anthony Bonner)
- Ray Bradbury
  - R is for Rocket
  - Something Wicked This Way Comes
- John Braine – Life at the Top
- John Brunner
  - Secret Agent of Terra
  - The Super Barbarians
- Eugene Burdick and Harvey Wheeler – Fail-Safe
- Anthony Burgess
  - A Clockwork Orange
  - The Wanting Seed
- William S. Burroughs – The Ticket That Exploded
- Taylor Caldwell – A Prologue To Love
- Alejo Carpentier – El Siglo de las Luces (Age of Enlightenment, translated as Explosion in a Cathedral)
- John Dickson Carr – The Demoniacs
- Rosario Castellanos – Oficio de tinieblas (The Book of Lamentations)
- Agatha Christie – The Mirror Crack'd from Side to Side
- James Clavell – King Rat
- Lionel Davidson – The Rose of Tibet
- Len Deighton – The IPCRESS File
- August Derleth
  - Lonesome Places
  - The Trail of Cthulhu
- August Derleth, editor – Dark Mind, Dark Heart
- Philip K. Dick – The Man in the High Castle
- Tonke Dragt – De brief voor de Koning (The Letter for the King)
- Allen Drury – A Shade of Difference
- Richard Gordon – Doctor in the Swim
- Edward Grierson – The Massingham Affair
- William Faulkner – The Reivers
- Gabriel Fielding – The Birthday King
- Ian Fleming – The Spy Who Loved Me
- C. S. Forester – Hornblower and the Hotspur
- Carlos Fuentes
  - Aura
  - The Death of Artemio Cruz
- Aldous Huxley – Island
- Hammond Innes – Atlantic Fury
- Michael Innes – A Connoisseur's Case
- Shirley Jackson – We Have Always Lived in the Castle
- James Jones – The Thin Red Line
- William Melvin Kelley – A Different Drummer
- Jack Kerouac – Big Sur
- Ken Kesey – One Flew Over the Cuckoo's Nest
- Fletcher Knebel and Charles W. Bailey II – Seven Days in May
- James Krüss – Timm Thaler
- Manuel Mujica Láinez – Bomarzo
- Anna Langfus – Les bagages de sable (Bags of Sand)
- John le Carré – A Murder of Quality
- Doris Lessing – The Golden Notebook
- Anne Morrow Lindbergh – Dearly Beloved
- H. P. Lovecraft – Dreams and Fancies
- Eloise McGraw – The Golden Goblet
- Alistair MacLean – The Satan Bug
- Gabriel García Márquez – In Evil Hour (La mala hora)
- Ngaio Marsh – Hand in Glove
- Khadija Mastoor – Aangan (آنگن, Courtyard)
- Yukio Mishima – Beautiful Star
- Gladys Mitchell – My Bones Will Keep
- Marcel Moreau – Quintes
- Penelope Mortimer – The Pumpkin Eater
- Vladimir Nabokov – Pale Fire
- M. T. Vasudevan Nair – Asuravithu
- Patrick O'Brian – Richard Temple
- Katherine Anne Porter – Ship of Fools
- Zofia Posmysz – Passenger (Pasażerka)
- Anthony Powell – The Kindly Ones
- Otfried Preußler – The Robber Hotzenplotz
- Reynolds Price – A Long and Happy Life
- J. B. Priestley – The Shapes of Sleep
- Mary Renault – The Bull from the Sea
- Mercè Rodoreda – The Time of the Doves (La plaça del Diamant)
- Sankar – Chowringhee
- Isaac Bashevis Singer – The Slave
- Aleksandr Solzhenitsyn – One Day in the Life of Ivan Denisovich
- Fernando Soto Aparicio – La rebelión de las ratas (The Rebellion of the Rats)
- Richard Stark (Donald E. Westlake) – The Hunter
- Mary Stewart – The Moon-Spinners
- Rex Stout
  - Gambit
  - Homicide Trinity
- Zaim Topčić – Black Snows
- Kurt Vonnegut – Mother Night
- Irving Wallace – The Prize
- Elie Wiesel – Day
- David Wilkerson – The Cross and the Switchblade
- Herman Wouk – Youngblood Hawke

=== Children and young people ===
- Joan Aiken – The Wolves of Willoughby Chase
- Rev. W. Awdry – Gallant Old Engine (seventeenth in The Railway Series of 42 books by him and his son Christopher Awdry)
- Ingri and Edgar Parin d'Aulaire – Book of Greek Myths
- Stan & Jan Berenstain – The Big Honey Hunt (first in The Berenstain Bears series)
- Tonke Dragt – De brief voor de Koning (The Letter for the King)
- Madeleine L'Engle – A Wrinkle in Time
- Penelope Farmer – The Summer Birds
- Ezra Jack Keats – The Snowy Day (picture book)
- Jean Little – Mine for Keeps
- Eloise Jarvis McGraw – The Golden Goblet
- Ruth Park – The Muddle-Headed Wombat
- Bill Peet – Smokey
- Otfried Preußler – The Robber Hotzenplotz
- Barbara Sleigh – No One Must Know
- Ivan Southall – Hills End
- Noel Streatfeild – Travelling Shoes (first published as Apple Bough)
- Bernard Waber – The House on East 88th Street (first in the Lyle the Crocodile series)

=== Drama ===
- Edward Albee – Who's Afraid of Virginia Woolf?
- Wilberto Cantón – Nosotros somos Dios (We Are God)
- Friedrich Dürrenmatt – Die Physiker (The Physicists)
- Witold Gombrowicz – Historia
- Arthur Kopit – Oh Dad, Poor Dad, Mamma's Hung You in the Closet and I'm Feelin' So Sad
- Spike Milligan and John Antrobus – The Bedsitting Room
- David Rudkin – Afore Night Come
- Peter Shaffer – The Private Ear/The Public Eye (double bill)
- Gwyn Thomas – The Keep
- David Turner – Semi-Detached
- Arthur Watkyn – Out of Bounds
- Wu Han (as Liu Mianzhi) – Hai Rui Dismissed from Office (海瑞罢官)

=== Poetry ===
- Bella Akhmadulina – Struna (The String)
- George Oppen – The Materials
- Al Purdy – Poems for all the Annettes
- William Carlos Williams – Pictures from Brueghel and Other Poems

=== Non-fiction ===
- Philippe Ariès – L'Enfant et la vie familiale sous l'Ancien Régime (Children and Family Life under the Ancien Régime, translated as Centuries of Childhood, 1962)
- W. H. Auden – The Dyer's Hand and other essays
- Helen Gurley Brown – Sex and the Single Girl
- Rachel Carson – Silent Spring
- Thomas B. Costain – The Last Plantagenets (last book in the Pageant of England series)
- L. Sprague de Camp – Energy and Power
- August Derleth – 100 Books by August Derleth
- Milovan Đilas – Conversations with Stalin
- Milton Friedman – Capitalism and Freedom
- Thomas Kuhn – The Structure of Scientific Revolutions
- Dumas Malone – Jefferson and the Ordeal of Liberty
- W. Somerset Maugham – Looking Back
- V. S. Naipaul – The Middle Passage: Impressions of Five Societies – British, French and Dutch in the West Indies and South America
- Louis Nizer – My Life in Court
- Russell Page – The Education of a Gardener
- Anthony Sampson – Anatomy of Britain
- John Steinbeck – Travels With Charley: In Search of America
- Percy Thrower – Percy Thrower's Encyclopaedia of Gardening
- Barbara Tuchman – The Guns of August
- Robert Warshow – The Immediate Experience

== Births ==
- January 17 – Sebastian Junger, American novelist, journalist and documentary film-maker
- January 29 – Olga Tokarczuk, Polish fiction writer and poet
- February 2 – Philippe Claudel, French writer and film director
- February 8 – Malorie Blackman, English writer for young adults and children
- February 21
  - Chuck Palahniuk, American novelist and journalist
  - David Foster Wallace, American novelist and essayist (died 2008)
- March 7 – Anna Burns, author from Northern Ireland
- March 27 – John O'Farrell, English writer of fiction and non-fiction, comedy scriptwriter and political campaigner
- March 30 – Yōko Ogawa (小川 洋子), Japanese novelist and essayist
- March 31 – Michal Viewegh, Czech fiction writer
- April 2 – Mark Shulman, American children's author
- April 6 – Javier Cercas, Spanish novelist and academic
- April 13 – Chris Riddell, South African-born English children's book illustrator
- April 22 – B. Jeyamohan, Tamil novelist
- May 11 – Amir Hamed, Uruguayan writer, essayist and translator (died 2017)
- May 12 – Yang Hongying (楊紅櫻), Chinese children's author
- May 17 – Lise Lyng Falkenberg, Danish novelist and biographer
- May 19 – Jonathan Dee, American novelist
- June 12 – Jordan Peterson, Canadian clinical psychologist and writer
- July 30 – Lavinia Greenlaw, English poet and novelist
- August 3 – Abdo Khal, Saudi Arabian writer
- August 10 – Suzanne Collins, American novelist and television writer
- August 16 – Christian Cameron, American-born Canadian writer
- August 27 – Sjón (Sigurjón Birgir Sigurðsson), Icelandic novelist and poet
- September 22 – Nuzo Onoh, British-Nigerian writer
- October 11 – Anne Enright, Irish novelist
- October 19 – Tracy Chevalier, American historical novelist
- October 28 – Mark Haddon, English novelist and poet
- November 4 - Rick Yancey, American young-adult writer
- November 12
  - Neal Shusterman, American children's author and poet
  - Naomi Wolf, American writer and activist
- December 17 – Jan Bondeson, Swedish non-fiction writer

== Deaths ==
- January 17 – Gerrit Achterberg, Dutch poet (heart attack, born 1905)
- January 20 – Robinson Jeffers, American poet (born 1887)
- January 24 – Ahmet Hamdi Tanpınar, Turkish novelist and essayist (born 1901)
- February 16 – Frank Prewett, Canadian poet (born 1893)
- February 24 – Hu Shih (胡適), Chinese philosopher and language reformer (born 1891)
- March 3 – Pierre Benoit, French novelist (born 1886)
- March 16 – Dora Adele Shoemaker, American poet, playwright, educator (born 1873)
- March 20 – C. Wright Mills, American sociologist (born 1916)
- April 1 – Michel de Ghelderode, Belgian playwright (born 1898)
- April 24 – Emilio Prados, Spanish poet and editor (born 1899)
- May 3 — Helen Dortch Longstreet, American social advocate, librarian, and newspaper woman (born 1863)
- May 24 – E. M. W. Tillyard, English literary scholar (born 1889)
- May 13 – Constantin Gane, Romanian biographer and historical novelist (torture, born 1885)
- May 26 – Wilfrid Wilson Gibson, English poet (born 1878)
- June 2 – Vita Sackville-West, English poet and gardener (born 1892)
- June 27 – Paul Viiding, Estonian poet and critic (born 1904)
- July 6 – William Faulkner, American novelist and Nobel laureate (born 1897)
- July 8 – Georges Bataille, French writer (cerebral arteriosclerosis, born 1897)
- July 21 – G. M. Trevelyan, English historian (born 1876)
- July 27 – Richard Aldington, English poet and novelist (born 1892)
- August 9 – Hermann Hesse, German-born Swiss novelist, poet and painter (born 1877)
- September 3 – E. E. Cummings, American poet (born 1894)
- September 21 – Ouyang Yuqian (欧阳予倩), Chinese dramatist (born 1889)
- September 22 – Jean-René Huguenin, French novelist and literary critic (born in 1936)
- September 23 – Patrick Hamilton, English dramatist (liver and kidney failure, born 1904)
- November 6 – Howard R. Garis, American children's fiction writer (born 1873)
- November 17 – Sandu Tudor, Romanian poet, journalist and theologian (stroke and possibly torture, born 1896)
- December 3 – Dame Mary Gilmore, Australian poet and journalist (born 1865)
- December 12 – Felix Aderca, Romanian novelist, critic, poet and journalist (cancer, born 1891)
- December 18 – Garrett Mattingly, American historian (born 1900)
- December – Ethel Carnie Holdsworth, English working class novelist and campaigner (born 1886)

== Awards ==
- American Academy of Arts and Letters Gold Medal for Fiction: William Faulkner
- Carnegie Medal for children's literature: Pauline Clarke, The Twelve and the Genii
- Eric Gregory Award: Donald Thomas, James Simmons, Brian Johnson, Jenny Joseph
- Friedenspreis des Deutschen Buchhandels: Paul Tillich
- James Tait Black Memorial Prize for fiction: Ronald Hardy, Act of Destruction
- James Tait Black Memorial Prize for biography: Meriol Trevor, Newman: The Pillar and the Cloud and Newman: Light in Winter
- Miles Franklin Award: Thea Astley, The Well Dressed Explorer and George Turner, The Cupboard Under the Stairs
- Newbery Medal for children's literature: Elizabeth George Speare, The Bronze Bow
- Newdigate Prize: Stanley Johnson
- Nobel Prize for Literature: John Steinbeck
- Premio Nadal: José María Mendiola, Muerte por fusilamiento
- Pulitzer Prize for Drama: Frank Loesser, Abe Burrows, How To Succeed In Business Without Really Trying
- Pulitzer Prize for Fiction: Edwin O'Connor, The Edge of Sadness
- Pulitzer Prize for Poetry: Alan Dugan, Poems
- Queen's Gold Medal for Poetry: Christopher Fry
