= The Harp and the Shadow =

1979 novel by Alejo Carpentier

- First edition
- Author: Alejo Carpentier
- Original title: El arpa y la sombra
- Language: Spanish
- Genre: Novel
- Publisher: Letras Cubanas
- Publication date: 1979

The Harp and the Shadow (Spanish: El arpa y la sombra) is a novel by Cuban author Alejo Carpentier. The novel was first published in 1979. Consisting of three parts, The Harp, The Hand and The Shadow, the book describes many historic characters, including pope Pius IX, Christopher Columbus and pope Leo XIII.

The book, Carpentier's last published work, has been considered part of the literary genres new historical fiction, Neo-Baroque and La nueva crónica de Indias, also expanding on the Borgesian concept of the text as a palimpsest.

== Background ==
In the prologue to the book, Carpentier said that in 1937 he heard a radio program about the book The Book of Christopher Columbus by Paul Claudel in the Luxembourg Radio. According to Carpentier, he was "irritated" by the "attribution of supernatural virtues" to the explorer. He later read a book by Léon Bloy, who supported the canonization of Columbus, even comparing him to Moses and Saint Peter, following the real-life attempts to canonize and beatify Columbus by popes Pio nono and Leo XIII.

== Plot ==
In the first part, The Harp, pope Pius IX is about to sign a decree asking the cardinals to canonize Christopher Columbus. As he holds the quill in his Vatican chambers, Pius thinks back on a trip to the New World he embarked on when he was a young priest and was still named Mastai. The trip, organized by the Vatican, was a mission to newly independent Chile. On his trip, Mastai criticizes and mocks Argentina, and especially Buenos Aires, and receives harsh treatment in Chile, rendering an overall negative impression of Latin America. After 9 months, Mastai and his party return to Italy empty-handed. In his trip, the conservative Mastai realizes Latin America needs a saint of its own that would unify it and bring it closer to the Catholic church and papacy in Rome. He comes to the conclusion that Christopher Columbus could serve that purpose.

In the second part, The Hand, Christopher Columbus prepares to make confession to a Franciscan confessor who is supposed to come see him. Columbus recounts his life in the first person, retelling his attempts to organize the first journey west in 1492 and detailing his knowledge of fantastic creatures, strange people and mythic monsters, all of which he expects to find in his journey. He also has an affair with Queen Isabelle I of Castile. In the end, Columbus does not give this revealing confession, and instead decides to "only say what can remain written in marble".

In the third part, The Shadow, a seminarian and a conservationist of Vatican relics discuss the proposed beatification of Columbus, this time by Leo XIII. Both feel that this second attempt of beatification will fail, despite believing that there should be a "maritime saint" and that Columbus should become a saint. Meanwhile, The Invisible, which is the ghost of Columbus, attends an assembly by the ghosts of intellectuals and canonical figures trying to decide on his beatification. They eventually come to the conclusion that Columbus will not be made a saint. Upon hearing that he will not be made a saint, The Invisible disappears and ceases to exist.
