= The Kingdom of This World =

1949 novel by Alejo Carpentier

- Front cover of the first edition of the English translation of the book
- Author: Alejo Carpentier
- Original title: El reino de este mundo
- Translator: Harriet de Onís
- Cover artist: Joseph Low
- Language: Spanish
- Genre: Historical novel Magic Realism
- Publisher: Edición y Distribución Iberoamericana de Publicaciones (Spanish); Alfred A. Knopf (English)
- Publication date: 1949
- Publication place: Cuba
- English publication date: 1957
- Media type: Hardcover and paperback
- Pages: 198 (Spanish); 190 (English)
- ISBN: 970-749-012-8 (Spanish); ISBN 0-374-52197-2 (English)

The Kingdom of This World (Spanish: El reino de este mundo) is a novel by Cuban author Alejo Carpentier, published in 1949 in his native Spanish and first translated into English in 1957. A work of historical fiction, it tells the story of Haiti before, during, and after the Haitian Revolution led by Toussaint Louverture, as seen by its central character, Ti Noel, who serves as the novel's connecting thread. Carpentier's work has been influenced by his multi-cultural experience and his passion for the arts, as well as by authors such as Miguel de Cervantes. The novel stems from the author's desire to retrace the roots and history of the New World, and is embedded with what Carpentier calls "lo real maravilloso" or "the marvelous real"—a concept he introduced to the world of literature (not to be confused with magical realism).

Throughout the novel, varying perceptions of reality that arise due to cultural differences between its characters are emphasized and contrasted. Carpentier explores hybridization, nature, voodoo, ethnicity, history and destiny, confusion, violence, and sexuality in a style that blends history with fiction and uses repetition to emphasize the cyclical nature of events. The novel was largely well-received with much attention paid to Carpentier's inclusion of magic realism and The Kingdom of This World has been described as an important work in the development of this genre in Caribbean and Latin American literature. However, some technical aspects of his style have been ignored by the academic community, and the novel's narrative organization has been criticized.

== Background ==
=== Author ===
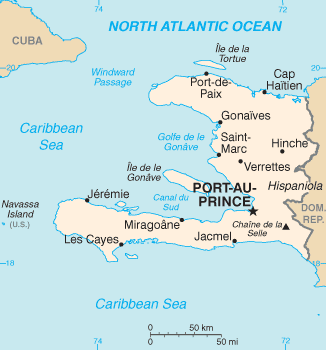
Map of Haiti

Alejo Carpentier was born on December 26, 1904, in Lausanne, Switzerland and grew up in Havana, Cuba. He subsequently moved to France in 1933 (at the age of 29) and returned to Cuba six years later, in 1939. Once in Cuba, Carpentier joined a group of young writers whose goal was to establish a literature faithful to the New World, by recovering origins, history, and tradition. In 1943, he travelled to Haiti, where he was made aware of Dominique Hyppolyte's play, Le Torrent, about the Haitian Revolution, which features a character named Ti Noel. As The Kingdom of This World coincides with Carpentier's return to Cuba, it is very much influenced by the author's re-encounter with himself and his origins.

=== Setting ===
The Kingdom of This World takes place prior to, during, and after the Haitian Revolution which began in 1791 and led to the declaration of Haitian independence in 1804. This revolution was a turning point in global history because it was unthinkable that such a massive anti-slavery revolt would not only take place, but also be successful; therefore, it challenged the prejudices of its time and ultimately influenced abolitionist movements throughout the Americas. Haitians became the second nation to break from their European colonizer (following the US). The Haitian revolution differed from the American Revolution however, as it involved the formation of a new national identity. Unlike in the US, the entire social and economic order that had been put in place through the practice of plantation slavery in Haiti was transformed.

In contrast to the intense single character focus of his first novel, ¡Ecue-Yamba-O! (Praised Be the Lord!), Carpentier offers a diversified and specific understanding of black society and its beliefs in The Kingdom of This World, including historical facts, character names, place names, and even street names. This creates a key blend of fantasy and historical accuracy.

== Influences ==
=== Other authors ===
Carpentier was influenced by a number of authors. Jean Price Mars's Ainsi parla l'oncle (So Spoke the Uncle) presents two arguments that Carpentier applied to his historical approach: firstly, from the perspective of a Haitian peasant, the Revolution did nothing more than replace leaders, since the exploitation continued; secondly, Price Mars assumes the authenticity of the belief in African gods, in contrast with a shallow Catholicism. William Seabrook's The Magic Island made connections between religion and history and was considered a beautiful book by Carpentier.

Carpentier was a great admirer of Spanish author Miguel de Cervantes, having cited him in a number of different texts throughout his career. The Prologue begins with a quote from Cervantes' Los trabajos de Persiles y Sigismunda (Persiles and Sigismunda), which is subsequently mentioned, with a focus on the character of Rutilio. The mention of Rutilio is noteworthy, as the episode has been of interest to critics due to its magical subject matter, concerning lycanthropy. Both works feature a distant and exotic land where the marvellous is present by means of metamorphoses, and viewed from the characters' perspective.

=== Theatre ===
Theatre also greatly influenced Alejo Carpentier's work. In all his work, Carpentier uses the characters he creates to explore the notions of subjectivity and identity, analyzing the way in which individuals see themselves and others within cultural settings. In order to achieve such an analysis, Carpentier makes use of spectatorship: his characters perceive a spectacle in alterable ways which parallel their alterable ways of experiencing the world. Spectacle situations are also sometimes used by Carpentier as a tool for the characters to reframe and rethink the world, as well as to establish individual and group identity.

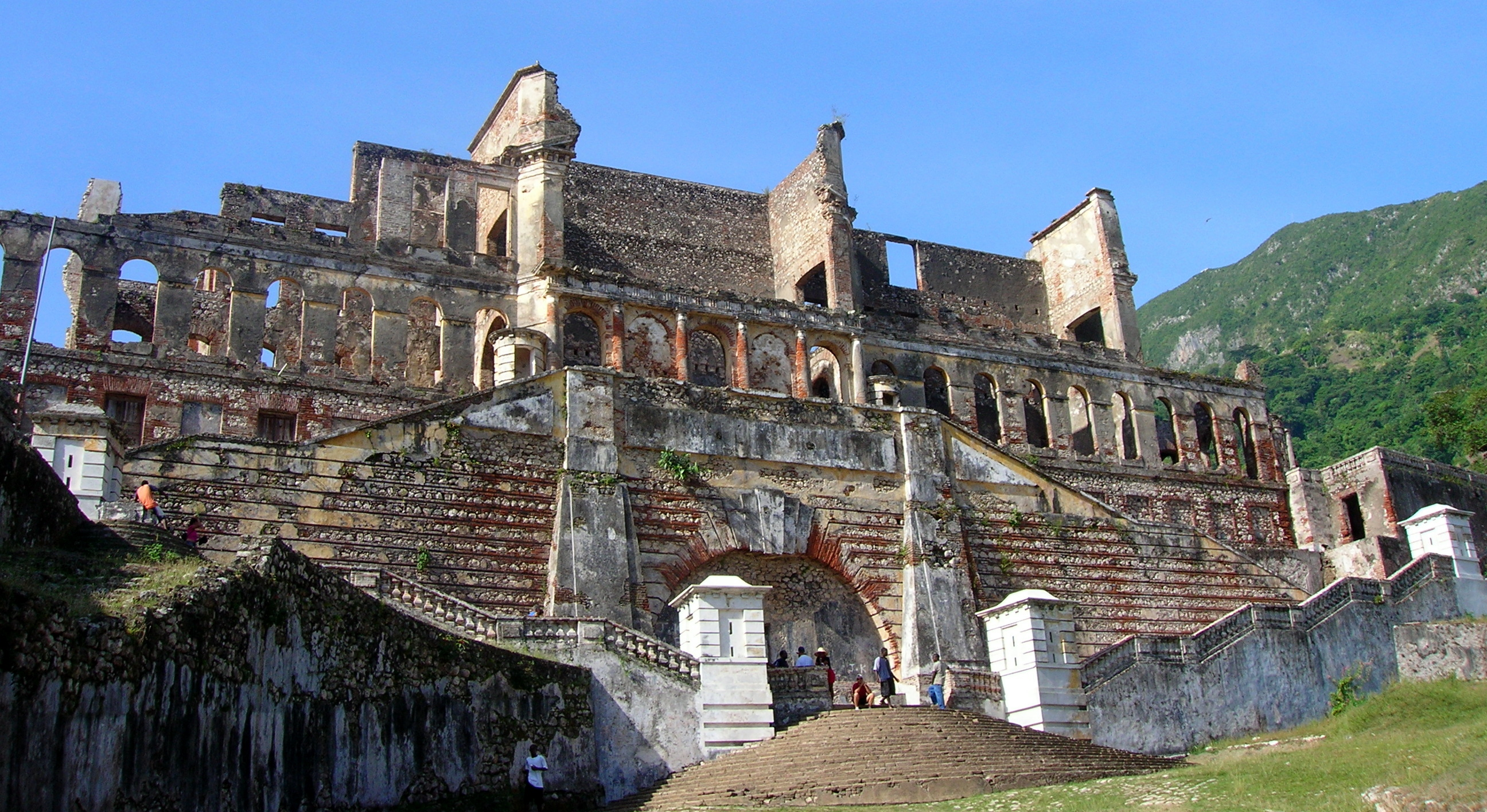
Front view of Sans-Souci Palace

As an example, the execution scene in The Kingdom of This World puts European and autochthonous cultures in opposition through the use of the spectator-performer relationship. In this spectacle situation, Carpentier is able to juxtapose the Europeans' experience of Macandal's body falling into the flames with the autochthonous (Afro-Haitian) experience of Macandal's body flying off the stake. Through the different, mutable views of the performance that he creates, Carpentier is able to represent an unstable cultural identity. As a second example, the scene that Ti Noel constructs around himself after the sacking of the Sans-Souci Palace presents the reader with a dramatic rehearsal in which Ti Noel represents culturally mobile subjectivity by performing different identities on his own.

Carpentier lastly equates the idea of Western theatre with that of a sham through Ti Noel's realization that disguising oneself to assume a role does not lead to community: "As Ti Noel was there in disguise, and did not for a moment consider himself one of the species, he took refuge by himself under his table." Theatre is also undermined when Ti Noel flees with Ruth (his wife and an actress), and in the end is faced with nothing but theatre on her behalf.

== Plot summary ==
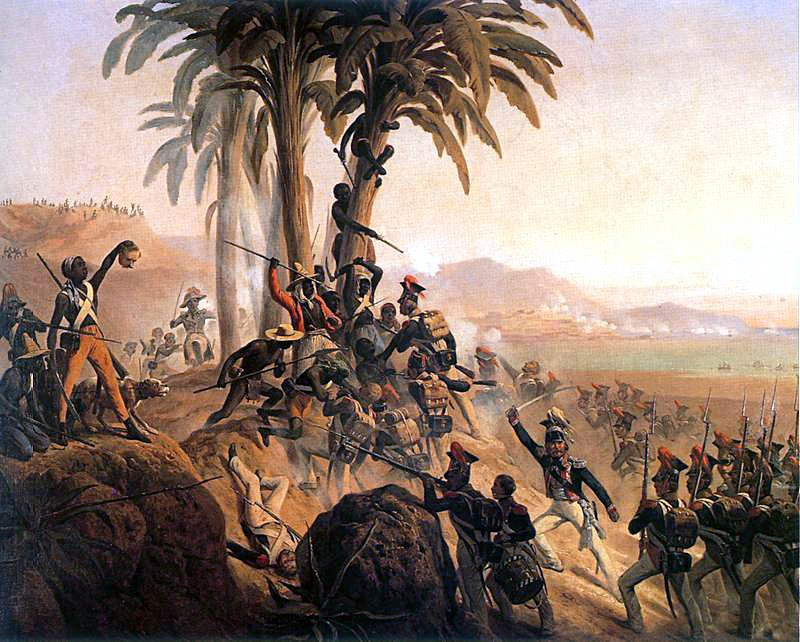
Battle on Santo Domingo, a painting by January Suchodolski depicting a struggle between Polish troops in French service and the Haitian rebels

=== Prologue ===
The prologue to the novel is Carpentier's most often quoted text, in which he coins the term lo real maravilloso ("marvellous reality") in reference to seemingly miraculous occurrences in Latin America. Furthermore, his trip to Haiti in 1943 is recounted, as well as some of the research he did to gather facts for the novel. Carpentier also denounces the commonplace and formulaic instances of the marvellous that is found in surrealist novels due to its inorganic and false origins, as opposed to the natural magic that is found in Latin America.

=== Part One ===
Ti Noel recalls the tales that a fellow slave, Macandal, would regale on the plantation of their master, Lenormand de Mezy. Macandal would tell tales of magical characters and mythical kingdoms with rivers rising in the sky. He is said to not only have irresistible qualities that appeal to black women, but also the ability to captivate men. He suffers an accident in which his left hand is caught in machinery, and his arm is dragged in up to the shoulder. Being useless to his owner, he departs for the mountains and discovers many secret herbs, plants, and fungi that appear to have magical qualities. Ti Noel joins Macandal and both learn about the magical attributes of these natural elements. Macandal suggests that the time has come, and no longer goes to the plantation. After the rain season has passed, Ti Noel meets with him in a cave populated with strange items. Macandal has established contact with surrounding plantations, and gives instructions to ensure the death of cows using secret herbs. The poison spreads, killing livestock by the hundreds as well as Frenchmen, wiping out adults and children. Madame Lenormand de Mezy dies as a result, and the deaths continue with entire families suffering the same fate. At gunpoint, a slave eventually explains that Macandal has superhuman powers and is the Lord of Poison. Death within the plantations returns to normal rates as a result and the Frenchmen return to playing cards and drinking, as months pass with no word of Macandal. Macandal, now with the ability to transform into animal forms, like bird, fish, or insect, visits the plantation to affirm faith in his return. The slaves decide to wait four years for Macandal to complete his metamorphoses and once again become a human. After four years, he returns during a celebration and all present are delighted. The chanting alerts the white men, and preparations are made to capture Macandal. He is captured and tied to a post in order to be lashed and burned in front of massive black crowds, but he escapes, flying overhead, and lands among the crowd. He is again captured and burned, but the slaves are certain that he has been saved by African Gods and return to their plantations, laughing.

=== Part Two ===
Lenormand de Mezy's second wife has died and the city has made remarkable progress. Henri Christophe is a master chef. Twenty years have gone by and Ti Noel has fathered twelve children by one of the cooks. He has told these children many stories of Macandal and they await his return. A secret gathering of trusted slaves takes place: Bouckman, the Jamaican, speaks of possible freedom for the blacks emerging in France and also mentions the opposition from the plantation landowners. An uprising is planned; as a result of this meeting, conch-shell trumpets sound and slaves, armed with sticks, surround the houses of their masters. Upon hearing the conch-shells Lenormand de Mezy is frightened and manages to hide. The slaves kill the white men and drink much alcohol. Ti Noel, after drinking, rapes Mademoiselle Floridor, who is Lenormand de Mezy's latest mistress. The uprising is defeated and Bouckman is killed. The governor, Blanchelande, advocates for the complete extermination of the colony's black population, as they pose a threat with their voodoo and secret religion. Several of the rebels are gathered to be publicly executed, but Lenormand de Mezy secures the release of his slaves, including Ti Noel, intending to sell them in the slave markets in Cuba. Lenormand de Mezy takes Ti Noel and other slaves to Cuba, where he becomes lazy, conducts no business, enjoys the women, drinks alcohol, and gambles away his slaves. Pauline Bonaparte accompanies Leclerc, her army general husband, to Haiti. On the way there, she enjoys sexually tempting the men on the ship. Solimán, a black slave, massages her body and lavishes loving care on her beauty. Leclerc develops yellow fever, and Pauline trusts in the voodoo and magic of Solimán to cure him. Leclerc dies, and Pauline returns to Paris while the Rochambeau government treats the blacks very poorly. However, there is the emergence of black priests who allow the slaves to conduct more business internally.

=== Part three ===
Ti Noel has been won in a card game by a plantation owner based in Santiago, and Lenormand de Mezy dies in abject poverty shortly afterwards. Ti Noel saves enough money to buy his passage, and as a free man, he discovers a free Haiti. Now much older, he realizes that he has returned to the former plantation of Lenormand de Mezy. Haiti has undergone great development, and the land has come under the control of the black man. Ti Noel is abruptly thrown into prison and once again made to work as a slave among children, pregnant girls, women, and old men. Henri Christophe, formerly a cook and now king due to the black uprising, is using slaves to construct lavish statues, figures, and a magnificent fortress. Ti Noel considers slavery under a fellow black man worse than that endured at the hands of Lenormand de Mezy. In times past, the loss of a slave would be a financial loss, but as long as there are black women to continue supplying slaves, their deaths are insignificant. Ti Noel escapes and returns to the former plantation of Lenormand de Mezy, where he remains for some time, and later returns to the city to find it gripped by fear of Henri Christophe's regime. King Christophe is tormented by thunder strikes and ghosts of formerly tortured subjects, and eventually he and Sans-Souci Palace are overrun by the blacks and by voodoo. Left alone, he commits suicide and his body is taken by the remaining African pages to the magnificent fortress where they bury him in a pile of mortar. The entire mountain becomes the mausoleum of the first King of Haiti.

=== Part four ===
Henri Christophe's widow and children are taken to Europe by English merchants, who used to supply the royal family. Solimán accompanies them and enjoys the summers in Rome, where he is treated well and tells embellished tales of his past. He encounters a statue of Pauline whose form brings back memories, and sends him into a howl, causing the room to be rushed. He is reminded of the night of Henri Christophe's demise and flees before succumbing to malaria. Ti Noel recalls things told by Macandal, and the former plantation of Lenormand de Mezy has become a happy place, with Ti Noel presiding over celebrations and festivities. Surveyors disrupt the peace at the plantation, and mulattoes have risen to power; they force hundreds of black prisoners to work by whiplash, and many have lost hope as the cycle of slavery continues. Ti Noel, thinking of Macandal, decides to transform into various animals to observe the ongoing events; he metamorphoses into a bird, a stallion, a wasp, and then an ant. He eventually becomes a goose, but is rejected by the clan of geese. He understands that being a goose does not imply that all geese are equal, so he returns to human form. The book concludes with the end of Ti Noel's life, and his own self-reflection upon greatness and The Kingdom of This World.

== Characters ==
The characters in the novel are integral to its understanding. Not only do they highlight the temporal and political context of voodoo and other forces, but they also allow Carpentier to surpass temporal and spatial limitations to reach the ultimate reality of life: the universal essence that lies in every human being.

=== Ti Noel ===
Ti Noel, an illiterate slave, is a protagonist of African origin. He begins as a young slave who, during the unravelling of the novel, travels to Cuba before returning to Haiti. He is twice branded as a slave but now is a free man. Although he grows old, he remains a witness rather than actor and more often reacts to, as opposed to causes, events throughout the novel. He is in admiration of Macandal's qualities prior to the loss of Macandal's arm; he accompanies Macandal into the mountains and is saddened by his departure.

Ti Noel is well established early on as not only a witness to events, but also as someone who makes observations and offers reflection. It is he who considers slavery under Henri Christophe worse than that under French rule because blacks are now enslaving fellow blacks. It is also he who offers reflections about the difficulty of this world allowing for the possibility of greatness during the concluding remarks of the novel. His perspective represents that of the folk, including his belief in the African gods.

Ti Noel has been considered a product of creolization, combining the African magical perspective of Macandal with the Catholic realism of Henri Christophe. A key aspect of the novel is that the main character is of interest not because of his skin colour, but rather for his human attributes that allow universal reflection beyond the realm of race. In this sense, magic realism is a necessary tool of expression and the technique serves to confront the novel's hero, better develop his purpose as a man, and advance a simultaneously profound and straightforward understanding of the human experience.

=== Macandal ===
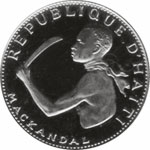
Macandal on a 20 gourde coin, 1968

Macandal is a black slave, first introduced on the same plantation as Ti Noel. He is admired for his qualities that are irresistible to black women and his ability to captivate men. He regales tales of great kingdoms and speaks of epic battles in which the animals were allies of men, of the incarnation of the serpent, of a queen who was the Rainbow, and of horses adorned with silver coins. Macandal has his left arm amputated after a machinery accident on the plantation of Lenormand de Mezy and, unable to complete heavy work, is put in charge of pasturing the cattle. He departs for the mountains and discovers many secret herbs, plants, and fungi about which he is taught more by an old, mysterious woman who is something of a witch. Macandal leaves the plantation, attains the ability to transform into various beings, and is represented as having superhuman powers due to his possession by the gods.

He spreads poison and kills much livestock and many Frenchmen to prepare for an uprising, but is forced into exile as the French become aware of his actions and begin to search for him. He returns after four years, but is captured and tied to a post to be lashed and burned in front of a massive black audience. While tied to the post, he metamorphoses into an insect and flies overhead before landing in the crowds. During the ensuing pandemonium he is again captured by ten men and burned in the fire. The slaves are certain that he has been saved and remain in defiant and jubilant spirits. The memory of Macandal is not extinguished in the flames. Ti Noel tells his children the stories he was told by Macandal, and they await his return many years later.

Macandal represents the link between spirituality and history; he is the inspiration for the rebellion, and the first one to employ the marvelous as a weapon of resistance.

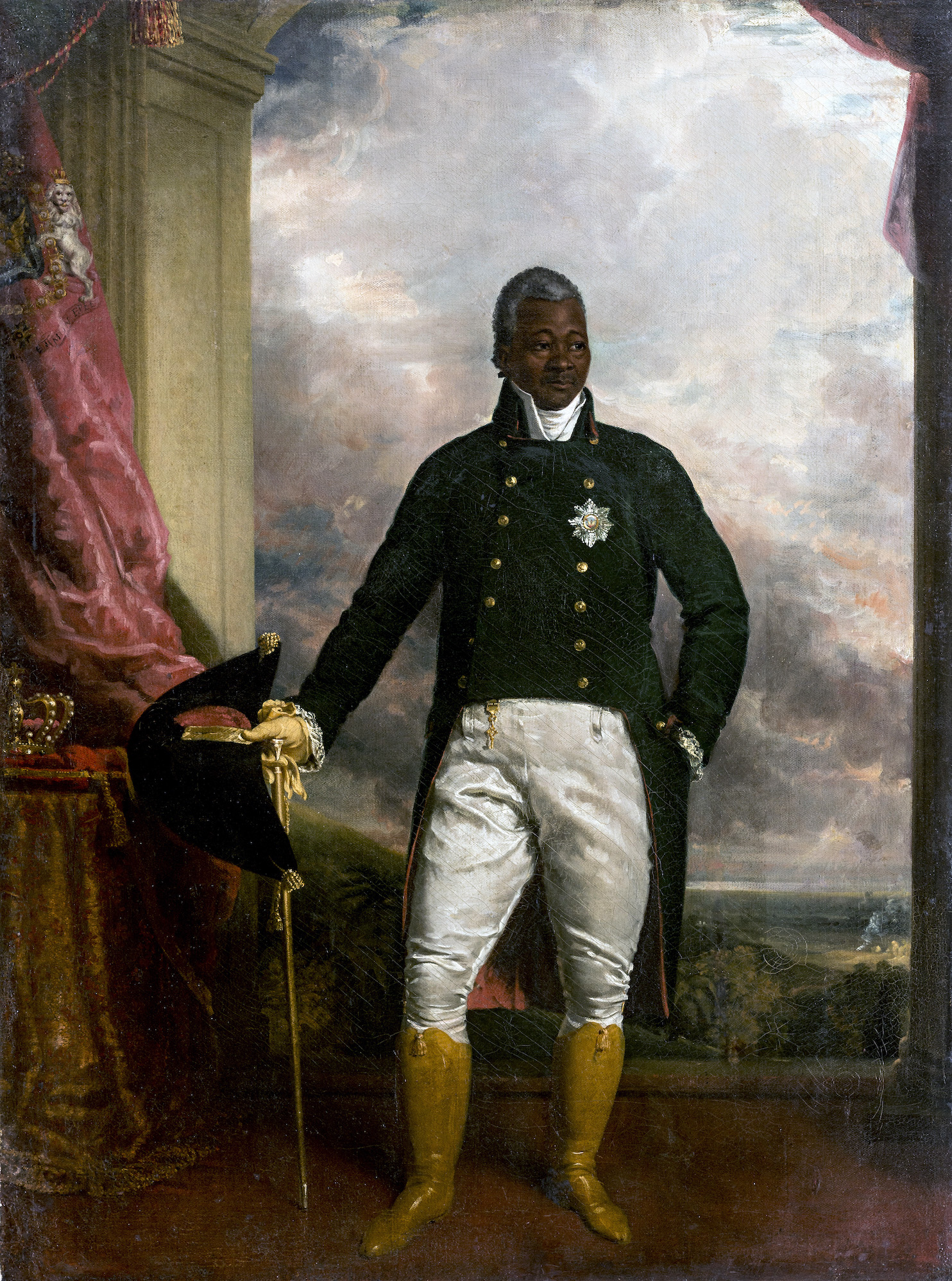
Henri Christophe, a key figure in winning Haiti's independence from France during the 1791–1804 Haitian Revolution

=== Henri Christophe ===
Henri Christophe first appears at the beginning of Part Two. He is described as a black master chef who has just bought the lodgings at the Auberge de la Couronne from Mademoiselle Monjean. His dishes are famous for the perfection of their seasoning and/or for the abundance of ingredients that allow for visitors from across the world to be satisfied. He is said to have a magic touch with turtle vol-au-vent or wood pigeons.

In Part Three, Henri Christophe has become the first King of Haiti and subjects the black population to worse slavery than that experienced under French rule. His regime carries out brutal torture and grips the city in fear. He is later tormented by thunder strikes and magical, ghostly appearances of previously tortured subjects. As the black population revolts against his rule, he finds himself alone and deserted. In this state he commits suicide by shooting himself. His body is taken to be buried in a fortress on a mountain and this becomes his mausoleum.

Carpentier's portrayal of Christophe has been considered "hollow" and one-sided, representing an archetypal tyrant at his most deteriorated state, seen only through the eyes of Ti Noel. This goes against the principle of historical accuracy, which should present a faithful portrait of society with characters who are fully conscious of their role in history. Carpentier portrays Henri Christophe, like most leaders, as a pompous fool, since the cycle of history continues regardless of his presence: his influence on the lives of people like Ti Noel is minimal. On the other hand, Christophe has also been seen as a representation of man's potential, rising from cook to soldier to king, reaching extremes of extravagance that exceed that of the previous French rulers, and ultimately falling pathetically.

=== Pauline Bonaparte ===
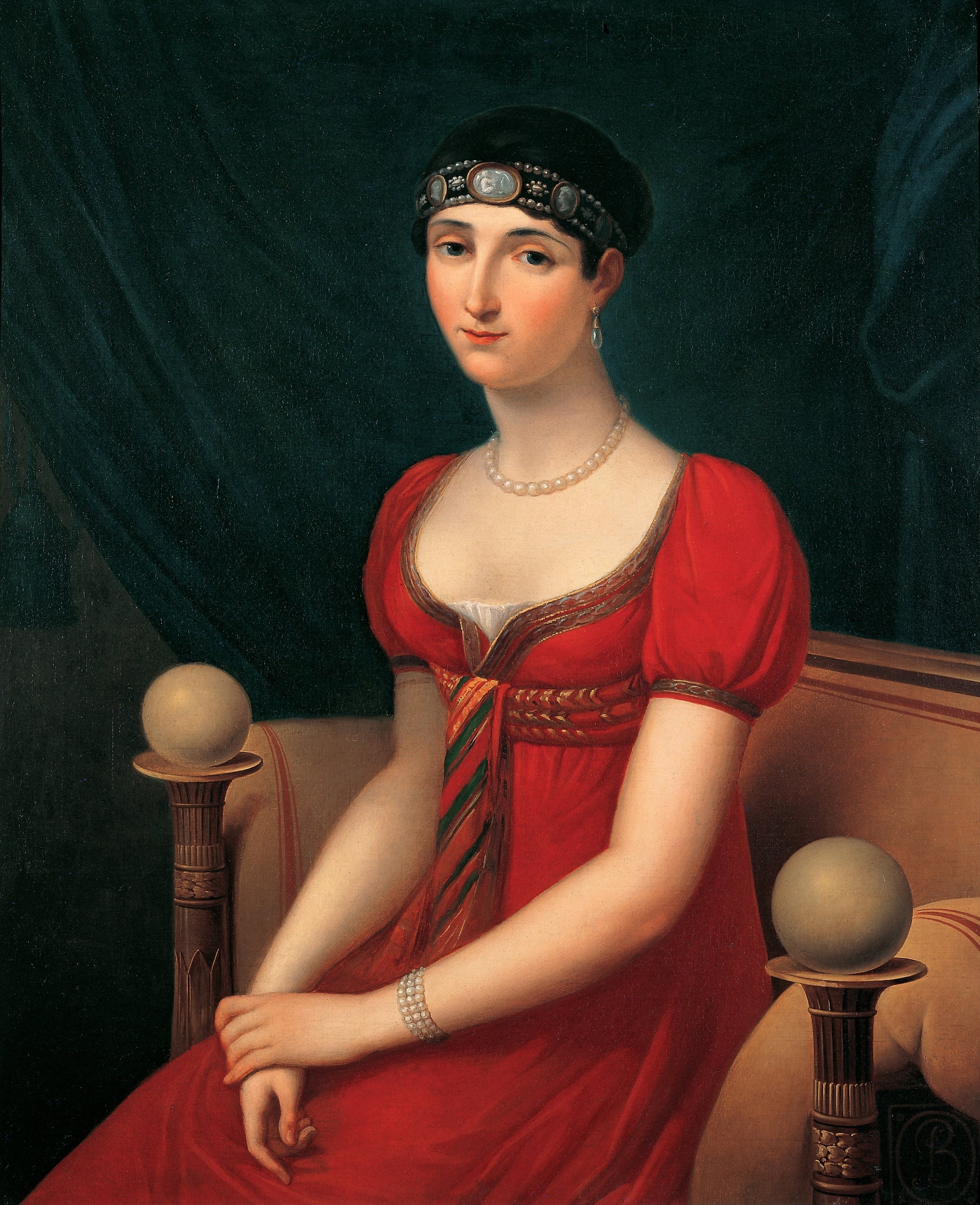
Pauline Bonaparte by François-Joseph Kinson (1808)

Pauline Bonaparte first appears on the ship of dogs being transported from Cuba to Haiti in Part Two of the novel. She is described as a beautiful woman who, despite her tender years, is familiar with the male body. She enjoyed tempting the men on board and for that reason would let the wind ruffle her hair and breeze through her clothes to reveal the grace of her breasts. She would also sleep out in the open. Pauline has Solimán massage her body and tend to her beauty. They form a relationship and when her husband, Leclerc, falls ill she puts her faith in the voodoo of Solimán designed to cure him. Leclerc dies and Pauline makes her way back to Paris.

Pauline Bonaparte is represented as immature, expecting an ideal life of fantasy in the Caribbean, while engaging in affairs with young officers. Her function in the novel has been a matter of debate, with different critics viewing her as a representation of white decadence, the immorality of the colony, or sexuality. It is a statue of Pauline that causes the beginning of Solimán's madness.

=== Minor characters ===
Lenormand de Mezy: Lenormand de Mezy is the white master of a plantation and owns Ti Noel and Macandal among other black slaves. He has multiple wives, mistresses, and sexual encounters during the course of the novel. Following the quelled black uprising in Part Two, Lenormand de Mezy leaves his state of hiding and arrives in time to spare the lives of Ti Noel and some of his other slaves. He takes them to Cuba to protect his assets, but while there, he gambles with his slaves, drinks much alcohol, enjoys the company of women, and loses what remains of his wealth. Having lost Ti Noel in a card game, Lenormand de Mezy dies shortly after in abject poverty. Lenormand de Mezy's name may be based on an eponymous Haitian plantation where the historical Bouckman is said to have conducted his famous Bois Caiman ritual.

Bouckman: Bouckman is of Jamaican origin and leads the secret gathering of trusted slaves, where he speaks of French requests for freedom for black slaves, but also of the resistance displayed by plantation landowners. He is present when staff is named and an uprising is planned. After the uprising is defeated, Bouckman is killed at the same location as Macandal is burned alive.

Solimán: Solimán is first introduced in the text as the slave who receives the fortune of massaging the body of Pauline and also lavishing her beauty with great care. He begins to conduct voodoo rituals with Pauline for the sake of Leclerc, who has contracted yellow fever. Following the demise of Henri Christophe, Solimán ends up in Europe, where he enjoys the summers. He is given food and drink freely and his appearance is the subject of much attention. He regales exaggerated and embellished tales of his past and even makes an appearance at theatre performances. He later comes across a marble statue of Pauline and this, coupled with memories of the night that witnessed the demise of Henri Christophe, causes him to fall into madness, flee, and eventually succumb to malaria.

== Major themes ==
=== Reactionary vs. revolutionary ===
The Kingdom of This World has a deep focus on the nature of revolution, and the novel itself can be viewed as a reflection of Carpentier's ideological perspective towards revolutions. Carpentier tries to establish the idea that a distinction must be made between revolutions and reactions. While a revolution produces progress, a reaction does not.

In the novel, the Afro-Caribbean slave population violently react to the oppressive regime imposed on them by the French colonials. The result of this armed reaction is the emergence of a brutal regime in which the oppressed become the oppressors. Sadly, the leaders of the newly produced regime fail to break the mold imposed by the French colonials. The ruling Afro-Caribbeans end up enslaving and oppressing their own kind and the resulting social situation is devoid of any progress. Carpentier's perspective on the Haitian revolution is revealed in the way that he portrays the cyclical nature of reactionary violence.

=== Hybridization ===
Hybridization, or the formation of a hybrid identity, is a theme commonly found in texts that deal with cultural differences. The theory of hybridization was originally developed by Homi K. Bhabha in an effort to explain the effects of interacting cultures. Bhabha's theory contends that, through the process of what he refers to as cultural translation, the interactions between two distinct cultures result in the formation of a hybrid identity. As the word "hybrid" suggests, the new identity is a mix of the two original cultures and the result is a new unique cultural entity.

In The Kingdom of This World, Carpentier writes about the struggles and conflicts that arise between the French colonials and the Afro-Caribbean population in Haiti during a time of revolution. Carpentier's prose is rich with examples of hybridization. One of the most striking examples is found in the chapter titled "San Trastorno", where black priests combine Voodoo and Catholic religious practices to form a hybridized religious entity. The hybridized religious entity can be viewed as heretical since it is a blasphemous, bastardized departure from both pure Voodoo and Catholic practices. Carpentier also has a tendency to hybridize many other components of his novel. The titles of the chapters themselves provide further examples of hybridization. Carpentier creatively chose chapter titles that had a well established connotative significance and distorted their meaning. For instance, the chapter titled "Las metamorfosis", does not tell the mythic stories of Ovid, but rather speaks of the metamorphosis of the slave Mackandal.

Carpentier's fascination with the notion of hybridity, and the associated cultural distortion is inevitably a reflection of his own search for a cultural identity. During his time in Paris, there was a profound public interest in the Americas. Although well versed in the French surrealist tradition and possessing a deep mastery of the French language, Carpentier never fully identified himself as a French writer. Instead, he preferred to define himself as a Spanish American writing in French. Furthermore, Carpentier was known to shuttle between claiming French or Spanish as his mother tongue, which further illustrated his cultural indecisiveness. In the end, due to his conflicting cultural influences, Carpentier's own feelings of being somewhat of a hybrid entity himself are mirrored in his prose.

=== Nature ===
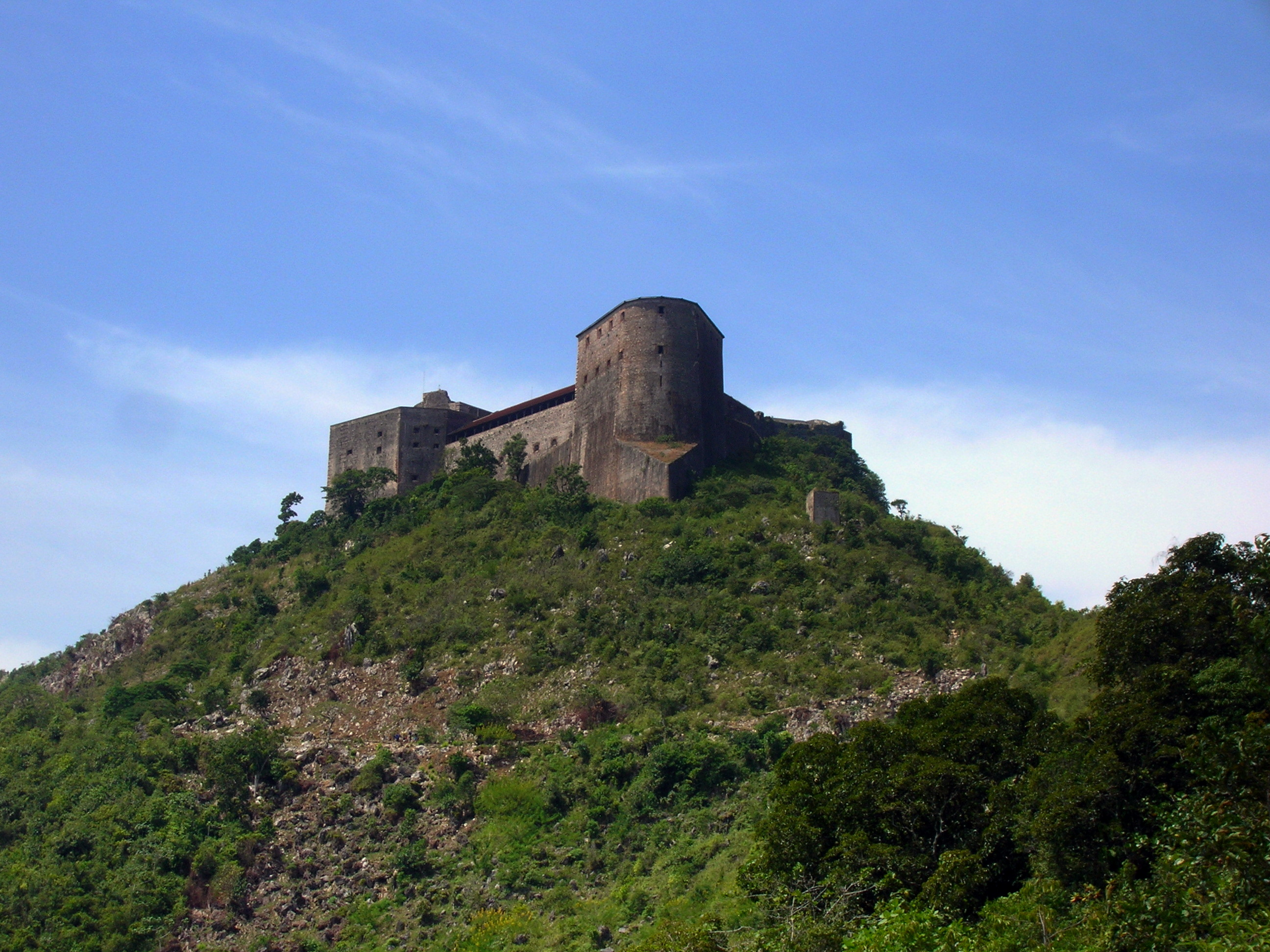
View of the Citadelle Laferrière, in northern Haiti

Macandal has expert knowledge of the nature of the forest, using its herbs and fungi as weapons against the planters. The ecological landscape of Haiti is used to represent the wreckage of the Revolution, being initially described as fertile and bountiful with the plantations, but later as worn down and bare. The powerful climate of the Caribbean is more similar to Africa than Europe, making nature an ally of the slaves. Natural elements also act on their own, with Henri Christophe's Citadel being attacked by fungi and thunderstorms before its completion.

=== Voodoo, Vodou, Voudou, Vodun ===
Although Jean-Jacques Dessalines, a pivotal figure in the Haitian Revolution, is barely mentioned in the novel, the one page dedicated to him emphasizes his connection to African gods while neglecting to mention any of his other features that made him an effective leader. While Dessaline's belief in African gods is highlighted, Henri Christophe's abandonment of the religion is stressed, being identified as the reason for his downfall.

The drum is the main feature of Voodoo in the novel, always accompanying the slaves. Drums, including conch shells and even thunder, announce all the armed revolts by the blacks and serve as a means of communication during war.

Vodou is central to The Kingdom of This World because of how the slaves practice. As a religion, vodou unifies the slaves through common practice and common language. In the novel, vodou is what motivates and inspires the slaves to rise up in rebellion. Through the use of vodou practices, Macandal is able to poison thousands of people. In the novel, vodou is used both to protect the slaves and to wage war against the slave owners. This point is drawn from an article by Rachel Beauvoir-Dominique, who says, "During the night of 14 August 1791 a Voodoo ceremony held in a place called Bois Caiman was a fundamental step in the unification of the slave population of Saint-Domingue. A week later the plantations (which were mainly sugarcane) were on fire, and the revolution had started. It was to last for thirteen years, until 1804" (Dominique 103). In conclusion, vodou was an integral practice in unifying the slaves and inspiring the revolt.

=== Contrast between black and white ethnicities ===
Carpentier's historical account is greatly simplified in order to increase the contrast between the white land owners and their black slaves. The marvellous, one of the most notable features of the novel, is used as a marker of contrast between the two groups: firstly, because mention of the magical always takes the form of the slaves' point of view, while the more real interpretation of each event is from the whites' perspective; secondly, because the marvellous is used as a weapon to fight injustice. Instances of cruelty and violence between the groups are recounted grotesquely in great detail, which enhances the rivalry. More importantly, by allowing readers to see through the slaves' point of view, Carpentier brings to light the power and durability of the Haitian community and destabilizes the narrative of Western supremacy.

=== History and destiny ===
A sense of destiny is present in the novel through patterns of repetition, including reversals of destiny in a number of characters. Characters who are paired together tend to suffer the same destiny: Ti Noel and Monsieur Lenormand de Mezy both witness the marvels of the age and slowly decline; both Pauline and Solimán indulge in their wealthy positions and then sink into madness. There is a clear pattern of succession from fortune to misfortune.

There is a socio-political cycle of order and disorder where, regardless of who is in power, the same injustices take place: when the blacks take control, they betray their own traditions and follow the example of European states. By means of these repeated scenarios, history is presented as a cyclical re-enactment of the same human dilemmas.

=== Confusion ===
The theme of confusion appears through the transplantation of characters from one world to another, for example from the characters' childhood culture to the one imposed upon them as occurs in The Kingdom of This World. Often, the characters find that reality does not lie entirely in either world. It is possible that this theme is well-developed in Alejo Carpentier's work because of the author's own personal experience with cultural transplantation (Carpentier grew up in Havana but later moved to France for six years and travelled extensively).

=== Violence and sexuality ===
The brutality of the Spanish American dictatorship is omnipresent in The Kingdom of This World through the images of torture, fire, suppression, and hungry dogs for example. Carpentier's characters often find consolation in sexuality (which is closely related to the sadism of the violence theme) after experiencing violence.

== Genre ==
The Kingdom of This World is a work of historical fiction. While the setting and the majority of the characters are based on fact, many of the events that occur during the novel are Carpentier's rendition of the actual events that took place during the course of the Haitian revolution. In the Prologue to the novel, Carpentier defines the phenomenon of lo real maravilloso, which has been considered one of the starting points for the genre of magic realism. Carpentier and Miguel Ángel Asturias are considered "pioneers of the contemporary Spanish-American novel" because of their mythologizing of the Latin American experience. Their work in between the late 1940s and early 1960s led to the Latin American Boom, one of whose main features was the use of magic realism. This being one of the first books in the genre, Carpentier had no guarantee of finding an audience and even covered publication costs himself.

His conception of 'marvellous reality' revolves around the natural fantastic qualities of Latin America and the Caribbean, as opposed to the overly forced and cliché efforts by European surrealists to portray magical occurrences. The result was the presentation of impossible or fantastic events described as if they were completely usual and natural, such as the metamorphoses of Macandal and Ti Noel. These events, however, often represent the beliefs of other characters in the novel. For a more detailed account of the differences between magic realism and Carpentier's real maravilloso, see the page on magic realism.

== Style ==
=== The "marvelous" ===
There are many instances of marvelous occurrences in the novel, such as Macandal and Ti Noel's metamorphoses and Henri Christophe's encounter with a spectre. Carpentier mixes elements of history and fiction with no clear division in between the two, which has been said to increase the liveliness of the novel. Furthermore, the lack of transition in between perspectives grants authenticity to the marvellous. The historical episodes and characters were chosen based on which are the most interesting and unusual and not on which are most important to accurately recount the history of Haiti. Roberto González Echevarría questions the historical accuracy of the work by arguing that Carpentier manipulated dates so that he could achieve meaningful associations in his novel.

Most moments in which there is a fantastic occurrence constitute a change in point of view, from the omniscient narrator to a specific character with particular beliefs. The introduction of magical events from the perspective of the slaves highlights their otherness, because while they may believe, for instance, that Macandal survived his execution, the whites, and especially the readers, know that he did not. The marvellous, emphasized in the Prologue, is a product of the characters' beliefs, which is why there is the shift in perspectives when presenting it.

=== Repetition ===
Carpentier reduces the individuality of the characters, enhancing the notion of humanity, keeping in line with the theme of history as a repetition of patterns regardless of who is in power. The simultaneous presence of fact and fiction and the cycle of reversal of fortunes presents characters as functional variants of each other. Through frequent use of metonymy, whereby a part replaces a whole, for example, referring to soldiers as uniformes (uniforms), Carpentier shifts the focus from individuals to the collective.

In The Kingdom of This World, Carpentier creates a succession of characters that engage in very similar actions. This repetition, a stylistic tool that resembles baroque writings, constructs a cyclical pattern in the novel which depicts the author's social views. The succession of characters (as well as places) that replace each other without fully developing on their own (or blocked from developing, in a sense) represent Carpentier's view of the social context in which forces are preventing characters from developing.

=== French stylistic influences ===
As a young writer, Carpentier spent a great deal of time in Europe. Due to his European heritage, Carpentier had a firm grasp of the French language and was also well versed in the French surrealist tradition. Although Carpentier could have easily become a successful French writer, he instead chose to write in Spanish. However, Carpentier never fully dislocated himself from his European heritage as Baroque elements are present in all of his works, including The Kingdom of this World. More specifically, Carpentier is notorious for writing in a sort of "heightened" language, which is best described as a hybrid of his European and Latin American heritages. Carpentier's heightened language takes the form "Frenchifying" Spanish-American prose. As such, it is not uncommon for Carpentier to apply French constructions and usages to Spanish words. For example, Carpentier used the intransitive Spanish verb desertar [to desert] transitively, as déserter is used in French.

Carpentier was an admirer of the elegance and wit in the work of satirical French writers and artists of the eighteenth century, and often employed grotesques in his descriptions to ridicule the ostentation of colonial aristocracy. Examples include Ti Noel's comparison of wax heads at a barber's shop to white men's heads being served at a banquet, or the portrayal of the decadence of Mademoiselle Floridor, a fourth-rate actress who performs for slaves as an outlet for her desire to act. Carpentier further satirizes the pomp of those in power through a series of details of protocol and ceremony whose cumulative effects ridicule the object of description, as is the case with Henri Christophe's chambers.

== Reception ==
The Kingdom of This World is considered to be Alejo Carpentier's first great novel. He is praised for his skillful inclusion of Haitian voodoo, myth, and history in the work, as well as for contributing to the definition of Latin American identity. Although the presence of fantastic realism in The Kingdom of This World has been acclaimed by critics and discussed at length within the academic community, this concern is paralleled by a lack of interest in Carpentier's technical work in the novel. In particular, his vision of time has been widely ignored. The Kingdom of This World has also been criticized for its narrative organization, which predominantly relies on apposition rather than on succession: the novel does not present history in terms of a sequence of events and their consequences. The gaps within chronological time that occur throughout this novel as well as the sudden changes of perspective and minimal transitional narrative have led some to criticize the book for the chaotic first impression it gives the reader.
