= Explosion in a Cathedral =

1962 novel by Alejo Carpentier

- First edition
- Author: Alejo Carpentier
- Original title: El Siglo de las Luces
- Translator: John Sturrock
- Language: Original: Spanish
- Publisher: Victor Gollancz Ltd. (UK); Little, Brown & Co. (US)
- Publication date: 1962
- Publication place: Original: Mexico; English: United States
- English publication date: 1963
- Pages: 360
- ISBN: 978-0-8166-3808-6
- OCLC: 45636826

Explosion in a Cathedral (Spanish title: El Siglo de las Luces, "The Age of Enlightenment" ) is a historical novel by Cuban writer and musicologist Alejo Carpentier. The book follows the story of three privileged Creole orphans from Havana, as they meet French adventurer Victor Hugues and get involved in the revolutionary turmoil that shook the Atlantic World at the end of the eighteenth century. Originally published in 1962, this is one of the most influential works written during the so-called "Latin American Boom".

Regarded as one of Latin America's greatest historical novels, Explosion in a Cathedral deals with the impact of the French Revolution on the Caribbean. The main characters are all members of one family: two siblings, Carlos and Sofia, and their cousin Esteban. The narrative deals with the cyclical nature of control, destruction, and development during revolution. Stylistically, it contains elements of existentialism and magical realism, and it mirrors the tension between Europe and Latin America found in many of Carpentier's other works.
