= Fernando Soto Aparicio =

Colombian writer (1933-2016)

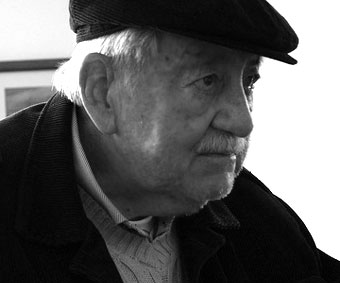
- Born: 1 October 1933; Socha, Boyacá, Colombia
- Died: 2 May 2016 (aged 82); Bogotá, Cundinamarca, Colombia
- Writing career
- Genres: Novels, books of poems, short stories, children's literature, essays, plays and scripts for film and television
- Notable works: "The rebellion of the rats", "while rains", "journey to the past", "Word of fire", "road walking", "demonia", "jasmine naked", "words to a girl", "The color of the wind"
- Notable awards: Selecciones Lengua Española Prize, Casa de las Américas Prize, City of Murcia Prize

Fernando Soto Aparicio (October 1, 1933 – May 2, 2016) was a Colombian poet, storyteller, playwright, novelist, librettist, and screenwriter. He was born in Socha, in the Department of Boyacá. Fernando Soto Aparicio spent his childhood in Santa Rosa de Viterbo. He is remembered for the novel The rebellion of the rats. After several decades as a professor at various universities in the country, in 1961 he was exalted with the prize Selecciones Lengua Española, in 1970 he received the Casa de las Américas Prize, and a year later, the prize City of Murcia. In total, he wrote about 70 literary works, among them novels, poems, books of short stories, as well as theatre plays.

== Literary works ==
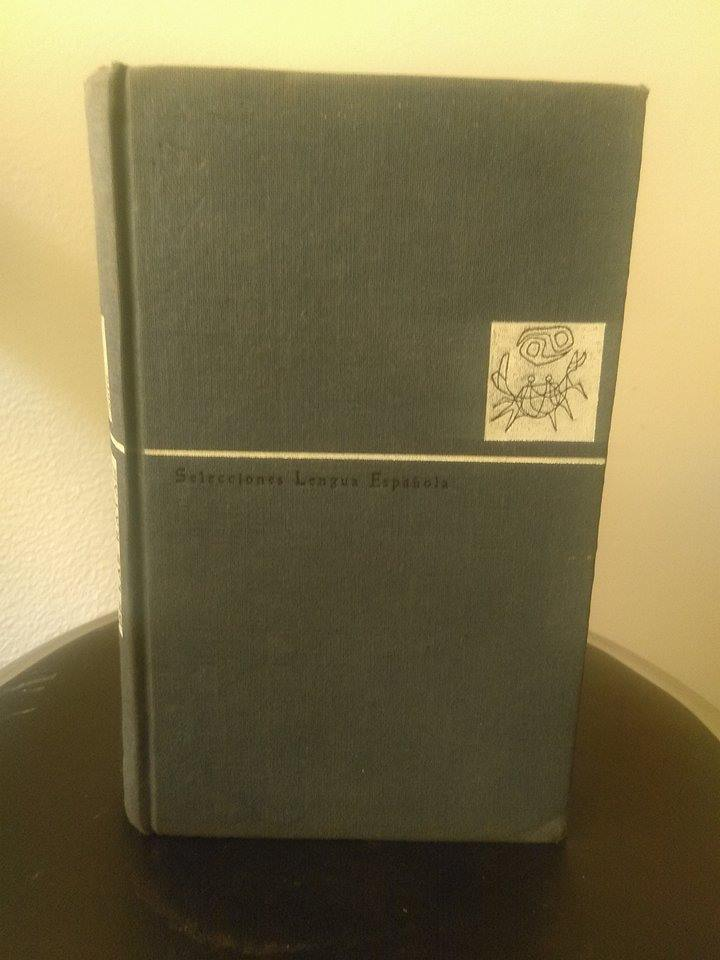
The rebellion of the rats, first edition.

The works of Fernando Soto Aparicio explore society in all its facets possible to portraying the relationship of individuals with the powers established (religious, legal, economical, military). Among his prolific work there are novels, books of poems, short stories, children's literature, essays, plays and scripts for film and television. Among them are:

Novels

- Después empezará la madrugada, 1960
- Los bienaventurados, 1960
- La rebelión de las ratas, 1962
- Mientras llueve, 1966
- El espejo sombrío, 1967
- Viaje al pasado, 1970
- La siembra de Camilo, 1971
- Viaje a la claridad, 1972
- Mundo roto, 1973
- Puerto silencio, 1974
- Proceso a un ángel, 1977
- Los funerales de América, 1978
- Viva el ejército, 1979
- Camino que anda, 1980
- Hermano hombre, 1982
- La cuerda loca, 1985
- La demonia, 1987
- Palabra de fuego, 1988
- Jazmín desnuda, 1987
- Los últimos sueños, 1990
- Los juegos de Merlina, 1992
- El color del viento, 1993
- Sólo el silencio grita, 1993
- Y el hombre creó a Dios, 1999
- La última guerra, 2000
- Quinto mandamiento, 2000
- No morirá el amor, 2001
- Los hijos del viento, 2003
- La noche del girasol, 2004
- Todos los ríos son el mismo mar, 2007
- El sueño de la anaconda, 2008
- La agonía de una flor, 2010
- La sed del agua, 2015

Poetry

- Diámetro del corazón, 1964
- Motivos para Mariángela, 1966
- Oración personal a Jesucristo, 1967
- Palabras a una muchacha, 1967
- Canto personal a la libertad, 1969
- Cartas a Beatriz, carta abierta a una guerrillera, 1970
- Sonetos con forma de mujer, 1976
- La paz sea con nosotros, 1980
- Pasos en la tierra, 1984
- Lecturas para acompañar al amor, 1989
- El amor nuestro de cada día, 1994
- Carta de bienvenida a la paz, 1999
- Las fronteras del alma, 2004
- Testigo de excepción, 2005
- Alba de otoño: sonetos, 2008
- Corazón, escribámosle, 2012
- La muerte de la doncella: fantasia poética, 2015

Short story

- Solamente la vida, 1961
- Los viajeros de la eternidad, 1995
- Bendita sea tu pureza, 1999

Children's literature

- Lunela, 1986
- Guacas y guacamayas, 1995
- Alfajuego, 2000
- El corazón de la tierra, 2008
- El duende de la guarda, 2013

Other

- La estrecha relación entre literatura, filosofía e historia; Cómo se investiga para una novela histórica, 1989, conferencias
- Para estrenar las alas, 2001
- Cartilla para mejorar el mundo, 2002
- Pedro Pascasio Martínez Rojas: héroe antes de los doce años, 2005, biografía
- Taller para la enseñanza de la felicidad, 2011, reflexiones
- La amante de Lubina, 2012, teatro
- Memorias de la memoria, 2012
- Bitácora de un agonizante: camino para cien voces, 2015
- ¡Yo tengo derechos y también... tengo deberes!, 2015

Compilations, selections, anthologies

- Presencia del amor: antología personal, 2010
