= Nosotros somos Dios =

1962 play by Wilberto Cantón

- Cover of the 1966 edition
- Original language: Spanish
- Written by: Wilberto Cantón
- First publication: 1962
- Genre: Drama
- Setting: Mexico City, early 20th century

Nosotros somos Dios, literally translating to "We Are God", is a play by Mexican playwright Wilberto Cantón (1923–1979). Published in 1962 and written in Spanish, it portrays the troubles of the Alvarez family during the Mexican Revolution. Cantón received the Juan Ruiz de Alarcón Prize for the play.

== Characters ==
Alvarez family

- Don Justo is the patriarch of the Alvarez family, and a minister in Victoriano Huerta's government.
- Clara is the matriarch of the Alvarez family.
- Laura is the daughter of Don Justo and Clara, and later, the husband of Octavio.
- Carlos is the son of Don Justo and Clara, and becomes a revolutionary.
- Luis or Luisito is the young son of Don Justo and Clara.

Other characters

- Octavio is Laura's love interest and eventual husband; he's a lawyer, revolutionary, and becomes the Undersecretary of Justice in Venustiano Carranza's government.
- Colonel Paez is an officer in Huerta's army and Don Justo's primary enforcer.
- Captain Aguirre is an officer in the Constitutional Army and a friend of Carlos.
- Criado is the Alvarez family's servant.

== Plot summary ==
Clara and Don Justo struggle with their children as their modern ideas conflict with the conservative ideas of their parents. Don Justo works in the government as a Minister to Victoriano Huerta, president of Mexico at the time. Carlos is influenced by his more left-wing friends and disagrees with his parents' ideology. Laura's parents want her to marry Milito Carral, but she loves Octavio Galvez, a well-educated lawyer and revolutionary. Luis, the youngest son, tries to run away from home because he is afraid of Don Justo. Clara and Don Justo send him off to boarding school because of his reckless habits.

Don Justo starts to throw a group of revolutionaries in jail after a demonstration at the Casa de Obrero Mundial. Many of these revolutionaries are friends of Carlos and Laura, including Jorge, Diana, and Horacio. Don Justo demands that Colonel Paez torture the prisoners to find out who the leaders of the demonstration are. In the end, Don Justo orders the execution of the demonstrators. Carlos becomes angry with his father because he was friends with many of the people who were executed. Diana was Carlos' girlfriend, and he tells Don Justo that he wanted to marry her.

When Venustiano Carranza overthrows Huerta, Don Justo is forced into hiding. Octavio becomes the Undersecretary of Justice in the new government. While Don Justo is in hiding, Laura and Octavio get married, and Laura soon becomes pregnant. Clara is upset because her husband is gone, but she does her best to keep the family together. Luis, who has come home from boarding school, is afraid of being sent back.

After three months, Don Justo returns to his family and house. Before any of the family members have seen him, Don Justo goes around the house and sees the changes that have occurred. He sees a portrait of Carranza along with a picture of Octavio and Laura's wedding. Don Justo is upset that he wasn't there. While Don Justo looks at these pictures, Octavio and Carlos are visited by Captain Aguirre, a member of the Constitutional Army and friend of Carlos. Captain Aguirre has come to the house with a search warrant. The government believes that Don Justo is hiding in the house, and that he is storing weapons for the counterrevolution. Captain Aguirre, being a friend of Carlos and respectful of Octavio, decides not to search the house.

Later that night, Don Justo reveals himself to Carlos and the rest of the family. They debate what to do with Don Justo, and consider that Octavio could write him a pass for safe passage (salvoconducto) to leave Mexico. Octavio is conflicted about turning him in. Carlos is angry and threatens to turn in Don Justo on the spot, and leaves. Clara begs Octavio to write him the pass, but Octavio is reluctant because he could be killed if the government were to find out. Laura wants Octavio to write the pass because she believes that if Octavio doesn't love his father-in-law, he will be unable to love their child. Eventually, Octavio agrees to write the pass. Carlos remains gone and Clara thinks Carlos turned in Don Justo, but when Carlos returns the police are not with him. Carlos and Don Justo talk and Carlos tells him how angry he has been with him after Diana was killed. He fills in Don Justo on what he missed while he was away and informs him of Laura's pregnancy. Carlos eventually changes his mind and asks Don Justo to accept the pass. Octavio's only requirement is that Don Justo must leave Mexico and never come back. Don Justo refuses and states that he "cannot betray those who trust in him" and that it is "too late to change his life."

The story ends with Don Justo anonymously calling Captain Aguirre and telling him "It would be useless to tell you my name. The lawyer Don Justo del Prado, enemy of the public, will be detained for 10 minutes in the entrance of his old house. Be careful with him. He is armed." Don Justo speaks with each member of his family, telling them he loves them and complimenting them on their strengths. He gives Clara a letter to present to Octavio writing that he "died so the new Mexico, strong and free, could be born", speaking of both Laura's child and Mexico itself. As he walks out of the house, shots ring out and he dies.

Following Don Justo's death, Octavio discovers the letter and reads it to the family, and the curtain closes.
