= The Rebellion of the Rats =

Novel by Fernando Soto Aparicio

La rebelión de las ratas [ en: The Rebellion of the Rats] is a novel written by Colombian writer Fernando Soto Aparicio and published in 1962. It is a testimonial tale about the hardship and inhuman conditions of the poor working classes in Colombia.

The book is about a poor mine worker, Rudecindo Cristancho, who attempts to form a miner's union. The organizing campaign turns into a rebellion that leads to Cristancho's death.

== Plot ==
The book starts with a description of the pristine landscape that existed before the arrival to the Valley of Timbalí of wealthy foreigners who brought with them “progress” to the region and changed the green landscape with the introduction of paved roads. The houses of the villagers now contrasted with the enormous houses recently built by the foreigners. Everything has changed since the arrival of the new settlers who also spoke a different language, used different gestures and had different habits. The problem was not much the difference in wealth but the damage caused to the agricultural land, which had been ruined due to the constant rolling of the heavy machinery that transported the coal. The villagers did not own the land they worked with their own hands, thus when they found themselves without land to work there was no other option than working in the mines. While agriculture disappeared, the mining industry thrived.

In this changed landscaped is where Rudecindo Cristancho arrives and his first surprise is to find that there is one street that divides the town separating the wealthy foreigners from the poor villagers. As he finds no place to stay he decides to settle in a garbage dump in the outskirts of the town. Sometime after, Rudecindo is hired as a worker in the mine where he finds out that despite enormous effort and the dangerous conditions, the wages are not enough for daily living. Realizing that he is not the only worker unhappy with the miserable working conditions he attempts to create a union but fails in the attempt. This causes unrest among the miners. Later on, this unhappiness turns into total rebellion when the miners discover among the rocks the rotting corpses of miners that had been buried by a collapsed tunnel. Outraged by the cover-up, the workers run along the streets causing a stampede, and among them, a small group of miners also decides to destroy the houses of the wealthy neighborhood. Rudecindo is killed in the stampede after he falls and the crowd runs over him.
