= The Tiger's Eye =

Short story by L. Frank Baum

The Tiger's Eye: A Jungle Fairy Tale is a short story by L. Frank Baum, famous as the creator of the Land of Oz. The story was unpublished in its own era, but has attracted significant attention since its belated publication in 1962.

Baum wrote the story most likely in 1905, to conclude his series of Animal Fairy Tales. The nine stories in that collection first appeared in nine consecutive issues of The Delineator, a popular women's magazine of the day, in 1905. "The Tiger's Eye," however, was not printed in the magazine, "probably because it was considered too frightening for small children." "Baum indicated in a letter" that the story "was intended to be the tenth of the Animal Fairy Tales in a planned book edition," but such an edition was not published until 1969, five decades after Baum's death.

"The Tiger's Eye" was "Perhaps...too strong meat for the taste of its day...." It did not appear in print until it was included in a special L. Frank Baum issue of The American Book Collector. The story was printed again in The Baum Bugle in 1979.

== Synopsis ==
The story begins simply and directly:

"This is a fairy tale of Pocofo, which is an island of the South Seas, where the people are black and have never heard of telephones or chocolate caramels."

The island is a harsh environment; half is dense jungle, where the animals devour each other when they can't catch human prey, and the other half is occupied by human tribes, who fight each other when they are not hunting the animals. Into this grim scene of "strong men and women and fierce beasts," a one-eyed tiger cub is born. His parents mourn his handicap, since it means that he will probably not survive for long. Searching for help for their baby, the tiger parents visit Nog the Magic-Maker for a second eye for their child. Nog "carelessly" lets slip the fact that the only way he can supply a living eye to the cub is to transform himself into it. The Tiger parents quickly insist that Nog do just that, or be torn to shreds. Nog is forced to comply; but his resentment and anger make the resulting eye an organ of malevolence.

Equipped with his new eye, the tiger cub is uncontrollably ferocious, attacking and killing creatures twice his size; worse yet, he violates the prime law of the jungle, and kills not just for the food he needs but for the pleasure of bloodlust. The animals band together to drive the young tiger out of the jungle and into the other half of the island. Now fully grown, the tiger carries out the same depredations on the human villagers.

Titticontoo is a chieftain's son, a cheerful and happy boy beloved of all, "a pretty child, with sparkling brown eyes and soft hair...." When the tiger attacks his home, the boy defends his mother and kills the tiger with his spear — but not before the tiger slashes the boy's face and gouges out his left eye. The Magic-Maker, still transformed, recognizes his opportunity, and pops out of the tiger's head and into Titticontoo's vacant eye socket. The magic eye restores the boy's sight, but turns him into a fierce warrior. He rescues his people from an attacking tribe, but his character is warped by the eye's influence. Titticontoo realizes that he is becoming a brutal and evil man, hated and feared by those who used to love him. Rather than suffer that fate, he plucks the evil eye out of his head. With the loss of the evil eye, he regains his normal good nature and the love and respect of his people.

The eye still lives. Titticontoo tries to burn it up, but the fire has no effect. He shoots the eye off into the jungle on an arrow; the arrow happens to strike a deer. The deer loses an eye in the accident, and Nog transfers again into a new host. The deer also becomes a ferocious killer, totally against its nature; and while it is drinking at a stream, the evil eye leaps out into the water. Nog knows that once he has passed through fire and water, the transformation is cancelled; he returns to human form. The father tiger happens to be nearby, though, and blames the magician for the death of his son. Nog races for the safety of his enchanted hut, the tiger close behind. The man loses the race; the tiger wins.

As one of Baum's "most powerful" short works, "a genuine horror story," the "unrelieved morbid terror" of "The Tiger's Eye" makes it unlike anything else in Baum's literary canon.
