= The Shapes of Sleep =

1962 novel by J.B. Priestley

- First edition (UK)
- Author: J. B. Priestley
- Language: English
- Genre: Mystery
- Publisher: Heinemann (UK); Doubleday (US)
- Publication date: 1962
- Publication place: United Kingdom
- Media type: Print

The Shapes of Sleep is a 1962 mystery novel by the British writer J.B. Priestley.

== Bibliography ==
- Klein, Holger. J.B. Priestley's Fiction. Peter Lang, 2002.
