= Alejo Carpentier =

Cuban novelist (1904–1980)

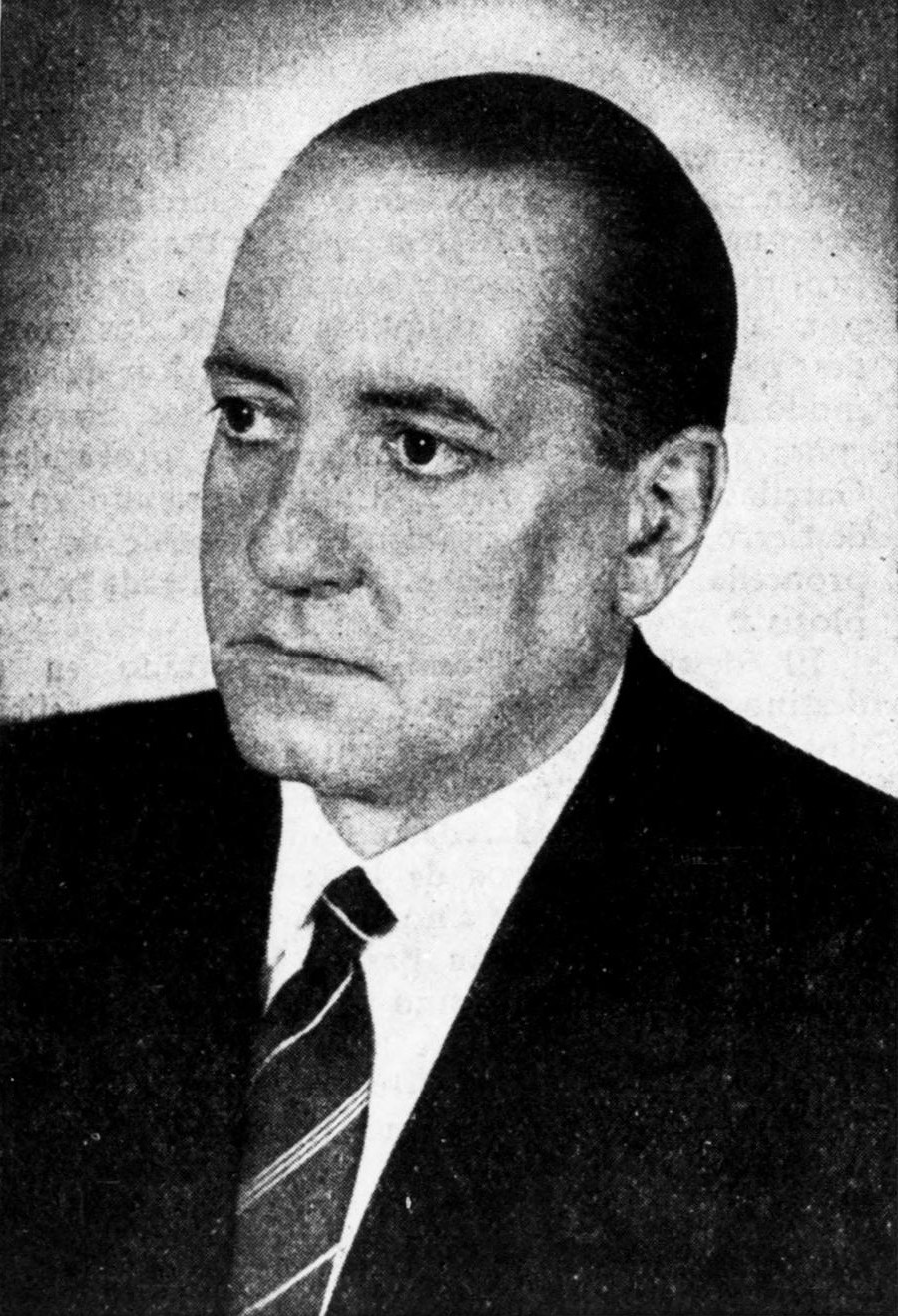
- Carpentier in a 1955 issue of Ínsula
- Born: Alejo Carpentier Valmont; December 26, 1904; Lausanne, Switzerland
- Died: April 24, 1980 (aged 75); Paris, France
- Resting place: Colon Cemetery, Havana
- Writing career
- Notable work: El reino de este mundo
- Notable awards: Miguel de Cervantes Prize; 1977

Alejo Carpentier y Valmont (Spanish pronunciation: [karpanˈtje], French pronunciation: [kaʁpɑ̃tje]; December 26, 1904 – April 24, 1980) was a Cuban novelist, essayist, and musicologist who greatly influenced Latin American literature during its famous "boom" period. Born in Lausanne, Switzerland, of French and Russian parentage, Carpentier grew up in Havana, Cuba, and despite his European birthplace, he strongly identified as Cuban throughout his life. He traveled extensively, particularly in France, and to South America and Mexico, where he met prominent members of the Latin American cultural and artistic community. Carpentier took a keen interest in Latin American politics and often aligned himself with revolutionary movements, such as Fidel Castro's Communist Revolution in Cuba in the mid-20th century. Carpentier was jailed and exiled for his leftist political philosophies.

With a developed knowledge of music, Carpentier explored musicology, publishing an in-depth study of the music of Cuba, La música en Cuba and integrated musical themes and literary techniques throughout his works. He explored elements of Afro-Cubanism and incorporated the cultural aspects into the majority of his writings. Although Carpentier wrote in a myriad of genres, such as journalism, radio drama, playwrighting, academic essays, opera and libretto, he is best known for his novels. He was among the first practitioners of magical realism using the technique, lo real maravilloso to explore the fantastic quality of Latin American history and culture. The most famous example of Afro-Cuban influence and use of lo real maravilloso is Carpentier's 1949 novel El reino de este mundo (The Kingdom of this World) about the Haitian revolution of the late 18th century.

Carpentier's writing style integrated the resurgent Baroque style, or New World Baroque style that Latin American artists adopted from the European model and assimilated to the Latin American artistic vision. With a first-hand experience of the French Surrealist movement, Carpentier also adapted the Surrealist theory to Latin American literature. Always eager to explore more than Cuban identity, Carpentier used his traveling experiences throughout Europe and Latin America to expand his understanding of Latin American identity. Carpentier wove elements of Latin American political history, music, social injustice and art into the tapestries of his writings, all of which exerted a decisive influence on the works of younger Latin American and Cuban writers like Lisandro Otero, Leonardo Padura and Fernando Velázquez Medina.

Carpentier died in Paris, France, in 1980 and was buried in Havana's Colon Cemetery with other Cuban political and artistic luminaries.

== Life ==
=== Early life and education ===
Carpentier was born on December 26, 1904, in Lausanne, Switzerland, to Jorge Julián Carpentier, a French architect, and Lina Valmont, a Russian language teacher. For a long time it was believed that he was born in Havana, where his family moved immediately after his birth; however, following Carpentier's death, his birth certificate was found in Switzerland.

In 1912, Alejo and his family moved from Cuba to Paris. As an adolescent, he read Balzac, Flaubert, and Zola. In 1921, Carpentier attended the School of Architecture of the University of Havana. When he was 18, his parents' marriage broke up and his father left. The following year, Carpentier left his studies and tried to find work to support his mother. He turned to journalism, working for the Cuban newspapers Carteles and Social. He also studied music.

Though bilingual from an early age, Carpentier always spoke Spanish with a marked French accent.

=== Cuba and exile in France ===
In 1921, while studying in Havana, Carpentier became a cultural journalist, writing mostly about avant-garde developments in the arts, particularly music." He contributed columns to La Discusión, a daily journal from Havana. His journalistic work, which was considered leftist, helped establish the first Cuban Communist Party. During 1923 and 1924 he continued to work as a columnist and also edited musical and theatre reviews for La Discusión and El Heraldo de Cuba. In 1927, with the help of Jorge Mañach, Juan Marinello, Francisco Ichaso, and Martí Casanovas, he became a founding member of Revista de Avance, a magazine devoted to nationalism, radicalism and new ideas in the arts.

The first issue appeared on March 15, 1927; it lasted until September 15, 1930, and became the "voice of the vanguard" and the primary voice of expression of the Cuban movement. Because of his involvement in such projects, Carpentier was often suspected of having subversive and ultramodern cultural ideas. Carpentier was arrested in 1927 for opposing Gerardo Machado y Morales dictatorship and had signed a democratic and anti-imperialist manifesto against Machado's regime and, as a result, spent forty days in jail. During this brief period in jail he started working on his first novel, Ecué-Yamba-O, an exploration of Afro-Cuban traditions among the poor of the island. (The book was eventually completed in 1933.)

After his release, he escaped Cuba with the help of journalist Robert Desnos who lent him his passport and papers. Carpentier decided on a voluntary exile to France and arrived in Paris in 1928; he remained there until 1939, when he returned to Havana. When he left Cuba, he was fortunate enough to avoid the political conflicts which had occurred during the 1930s. During this time certain positions were unacceptable to the authorities and Cuban intellectuals were forced to define their political position and for these and other political reasons he decided to leave.

During this time abroad, his disconnection from Cuba and the interaction with different groups of intellectuals and artists in Paris helped with his "critical vision". Carpentier felt that it was important for him to remain outside the influences of movements because he believed in maintaining a "balance against the insularity of his homeland". Upon arriving in Paris he immediately began working on poems and editorials in Parisian and Cuban magazines. Contributions to the Parisian Journal such as the short story "Cahiers du Sud" (1933), in French, were an effort to acquire European readers as a way to improve his recognition. He also contributed to the magazines Documents and L'Intransigeant. Carpentier was familiar with the activities of the Comité de Jeunes Revolutionnaires Cubains, a group of exiled Cuban leftists who had published La Terreur á Cuba, a brochure against the Machado government. He documented the latest news about this group and their activities in his book Homenaje a nuestros amigos de Paris. It was also during this time that, with the help of Robert Desnos, Carpentier became part of the surrealist movement which became a positive influence in his work. While in France, Carpentier also founded a literary magazine called Imán in 1931, for which he became editor-in-chief. Most of the authors who worked with him in La Revolution Surrealiste also contributed works in Imán under the title "Conocimiento de America". Carpentier contributed the short story Histoire de Lunes (1933); it was experimental for its time as it contained elements of fantasy and folklore characterized as magical reality.

Surrealism helped Carpentier to see contexts and aspects, especially those of American life, which he did not see before and after working among the leading artistic figures for some time, Carpentier did not feel overly enthusiastic about his work within surrealism and had felt that his "surrealist attempts ha[d] been in vain" describing his frustration, as he felt he had "nothing to add to this movement in France".

As Carpentier became acquainted with those among the arts community he had several encounters to meet other famous authors such as Pablo Neruda, who had sent him a draft of his book Residencia en la Tierra to review; Guatemalan author Miguel Ángel Asturias, whose work on pre-Columbian mythology influenced his writing; and Pablo Picasso, an introduction made possible through Carpentier's connection with friends in the arts.

Throughout his time in France Carpentier was occupied with not only literary works, but also other projects that kept him engaged within the arts. He collaborated with French composer Marins François Gaillard on the musical Yamba-O, "a burlesque tragedy", that was presented in the Théâtre Beriza in Paris (1928); and with composer Amadeo Roldán helped organize the Cuban premieres of works by Stravinsky and Poulenc. In film, Carpentier wrote text and edited music for the French documentary Le Vaudou. He continued to earn his living by writing on contemporary culture, both in French and Spanish. He also began working for a French radio station as a sound-technician and producer. From 1932 until 1939 Carpentier worked on several projects produced by Foniric Studios. He directed the production of Le Livre de Christophe Colomb and collaborated with Desnos on arranging readings of Edgar Allan Poe's The Murders in the Rue Morgue, and Walt Whitman's Salute to the World. Although abroad, Carpentier still maintained contact with Cuba by sending articles and poems to contribute to Havana publications such as Ensayos Convergentes.

When the Machado regime came to an end in 1933, Carpentier decided to make plans to return to his native land to visit, and in 1936 he made the trip back to Cuba. The time he had spent in Paris for over eleven years had enriched and "oriented his expressive abilities". Carpentier himself indicated that he was tiring of Paris, and "...in 1939 without any other reason than the nostalgia of Cuba, I vacated my apartment and started the return to La Habana".

=== Years in Haiti and return to Cuba ===
In 1943, accompanied by French theatrical director Louis Jouvet, Carpentier made a crucial trip to Haiti, during which he visited the fortress of the Citadelle Laferrière and the Palace of Sans-Souci, both built by the black king Henri Christophe. This trip, along with readings from Oswald Spengler's cyclical interpretation of history, provided the inspiration for his second novel, El Reino de Este Mundo (The Kingdom of this World) (1949).

Carpentier returned to Cuba and continued to work as a journalist at the outbreak of World War II. He worked on a history of Cuban music, eventually published in 1946 as La música en Cuba.

=== Life in Venezuela ===
In 1945, Carpentier moved to Caracas as an exile. From 1945 to 1959 he lived in Venezuela, which is the inspiration for the unnamed South American country in which much of his novel The Lost Steps takes place.

He wrote short stories which were later collected in The War of Time (1958). While in Cuba, Carpentier attended a santería ceremony that was to further deepen his interest in Afro-Cubanism. In 1949, he finished his novel The Kingdom of this World. This novel has a prologue that "outlines Carpentier's faith in the destiny of Latin America and the aesthetic implications of its peculiar cultural heritage."

=== Later life ===
Carpentier returned to Cuba after the triumph of the revolution led by Fidel Castro in 1959. He worked for the State Publishing House while he completed the baroque-style book, El Siglo de las Luces (Explosion in a Cathedral) (1962). This novel discusses the advent of the Enlightenment and the ideas of the French Revolution in the New World. It has twin leitmotifs of the printing press and the guillotine and can be read as a "meditation on the dangers inherent in all revolutions as they begin to confront the temptations of dictatorship." After reading the book, Gabriel García Márquez is said to have discarded the first draft of One Hundred Years of Solitude and begun again from scratch.

In 1966, Carpentier settled in Paris where he served as Cuban ambassador to France. In 1975 he was the recipient of the Prix mondial Cino Del Duca. He received the Cervantes Prize in 1977 and was recipient of the French Laureates Prix Médicis étranger in 1979 for La harpe et l'ombre. A perennial contender for the Nobel Prize in Literature, Carpentier was first nominated for the award in 1965.

Carpentier was struggling with cancer as he completed his final novel, El arpa y la sombra, and finally died in Paris on April 24, 1980. His remains were returned to Cuba for interment in the Colon Cemetery, Havana.

École Française de la Havane "Alejo Carpentier", a French international school in Havana, is named after him.

== Themes ==
=== Lo real maravilloso ===
Carpentier is widely known for his theory of lo real maravilloso. This is the notion that the history and the geography of Latin America are both so extreme as to appear fictional or even magical to outsiders. Thus, Latin America is a region where the line between magic and reality is blurred. It was in the prologue to The Kingdom of this World, a novel of the Haitian Revolution, that he described his vision of lo real maravilloso: "But what is the history of Latin America but a chronicle of magical realism?" The novel itself develops the outlandish (but true) history of Henri Christophe, first king of Haiti, as an example of how the real history of Latin America is so strange as to appear fictional. Some critics interpret the real maravilloso as being synonymous with magical realism. However, Carpentier's theory and its development in his work are more limited in their scope than is the magical realism of, for example, Gabriel García Márquez. Whereas García Márquez's works include events that the reader never mistakes for reality (rainfall of flowers, old men with wings, etc.), Carpentier, for the most part, simply writes about extreme aspects of the history and geography of Latin America, aspects that are almost unbelievable, but that are in fact true.

=== Music ===
As a young child Carpentier was exposed to a great deal of music. Carpentier himself played the piano, as did his mother; his father played cello, studying under Pablo Casals, and his grandmother played the organ. Carpentier studied music theory at the Lycée Janson-de-Sailly when he lived in Paris for the first time. Carpentier's own compositions made him an important part of the contemporary Cuban musical landscape, but he also studied the origins and political nuances of Cuban music. His devotion to the adaptations of European artistic styles into Latin American music styles can also be seen in his admiration for Afro-Cuban musical themes.

Early in his career Carpentier collaborated with other young musicians eager to explore Cuban musical roots. One such collaborator was Amadeo Roldán, a French musician of Cuban background. They helped to organize the Cuban premiere of popular orchestral music of the era Conciertos de música nueva (Concerts of New Music), featuring composers such as Stravinsky, Milhaud, Ravel, Malipiero, Poulenc and Satie. In regards to their own music, Carpentier and Roldán were far more interested in integrating African rhythms and melodies into their works and abandoned imitation of European musical styles. "¡Abajo la lira, arriba el bongó!" (Down with the lyre, up with the bongo!) was the popular slogan for their style of music. Carpentier and Roldán collaborated on numerous works, including the 1925 orchestral piece Obertura sobre temas cubanos (Overture on Cuban Themes) which was regarded as scandalous for its betrayal of what was seen as the proper European-style symphony in favor of Afro-Cuban inspired music. Other well-known collaborations between the two included Tres pequeñas poemas: Oriente, Pregón, Fiesta negra (Three little poems) produced in 1926, and two Afro-Cuban ballets: La Rebambaramba, a colonial ballet in two parts (1928) and El milagro de Anaquille (1929).

Carpentier's interest in music had great influence on his prose writing. Navarro suggests that readers of Carpentier's works are more listeners than they are readers. Lyrical use of colloquial dialects, literary rhythms such as alliteration and assonance and the theme of music within the world of the narrative (drums, footsteps, etc.) are a few examples of music's influence over Carpentier's work. In an interview the author himself was quoted as saying "Music is present in all of my work." For Carpentier, analysis of Cuban identity was grounded in the analysis of Cuban music. As such, for Carpentier to better understand Cuban identity through his work, he eagerly integrated music into his writing.

=== Ethnomusicology and Afro-Cubanism ===
With this intrinsic appreciation of music and a fascination with Cuban identity, Carpentier began investigating the origins of Cuban music in a more academic sense. In 1946, Carpentier published the ethnomusicological study La Música en Cuba which explores how European music, transplanted African music and the indigenous music of the island all blended together to create Cuban music. Carpentier took particular interest in Afro-Cuban themes.

Particularly fascinated with the overwhelming influence of African music in Cuban music, Carpentier introduced Afro-Cuban influenced music called lo afrocubano, (i.e. heavily improvised and rhythm based music) into what was deemed more formal music venues dependent on European styles, called lo guajiro. Carpentier once wrote that lo guajiro was, "very poetic, but lo guajiro is not music...On the other hand, in mestizo and black music...the rich material has an incredible wealth to it...to make it the work of national expression." Because of racial tensions between white Cubans and black and criollo Cubans, such preferences were not well received by the Cuban elite of the mid century. Carpentier devoted the majority of his musicology research to the Afro-Cuban influences present in Cuba. For example, Carpentier paid particular attention to Contradanza, a wildly popular Cuban dance derived from the European style of music and dance, Contredanse. The ample room left for musical improvisation and the element of group dance were easily adapted into African musical tradition where improvisation and dance play integral roles. Hence, a hybrid musical form unique to Cuba was created. Carpentier argued that the improvisation inherent in African influenced music allowed for varied interpretations that catalyzed regional differences and therefore regional identity, and concluded that this was why Cuba had such a varied musical identity.

== Major works ==
Carpentier's major works include:

Novels

- ¡Écue-Yamba-O! (1933) (Praised Be the Lord!)
- El reino de este mundo (1949) (The Kingdom of this World)
- Los pasos perdidos (1953) (The Lost Steps)
- El acoso (1956) (The Chase, American English translation 1989 by Alfred Mac Adam)
- El siglo de las luces (1962) (Explosion in a Cathedral)
- Concierto barroco (1974) (Concierto barroco; English: Baroque Concert), based on the 1709 meeting of Vivaldi, Handel and Domenico Scarlatti, with cameo appearances by Wagner and Stravinsky, and fictional characters from the new world who inspire the Venetian composer's opera, Motezuma.
- El Recurso del método (1974) (Reasons of State)
- La consagración de la primavera (1978) (The Rite of Spring; Le Sacre du Printemps, ballet by Igor Stravinsky)
- El arpa y la sombra (1979) (The Harp and the Shadow) dealing with Columbus.

Short stories

- El sacrificio (1923) (The Sacrifice)
- Viaje a la semilla (1944) (Journey to the Seed)
- Oficio de tinieblas (1944) (Office of Darkness)
- Guerra del tiempo (1956) (War of Time)
- Otros relatos (1984) (Other Stories)

Essays

- La música en Cuba (1946) (The Music of Cuba), an ethno-musicological study of Cuba starting from the 16th century, the arrival of European explorers, till the present day of publication, the mid-20th century.
- Tristán e Isolda en tierra firme (1949) (Tristan and Isolde on the Mainland)
- Literatura y conciencia en América Latina (1969) (Literature and Consciousness in Latin America)
- La ciudad de las columnas (1970) (The City of Columns)
- América Latina en su música (1975) (Latin America in its Music)
- Razón de ser (1976) (Reason for Being)
- Afirmación literaria americanista (1979) (Americanist Literary Affirmation)
- El adjetivo y sus arrugas (1980) (The Adjective and its Wrinkles)
- El músico que llevo dentro (1980) (The Musician in Me)
- Conferencias (1987) (Conferences)

=== El reino de este mundo (The Kingdom of This World) ===
Carpentier's El reino de este mundo (1949) highlights the Haitian Revolution of the 18th century when the African slaves fought the French colonists for their freedom and basic human rights. The novel combines not only historical references of the event with aspects of African faith and rituals, most notably Haitian vodou; but also the connections between corporeal and spiritual self. The story is seen through the eyes of the protagonist Ti Noël, a black slave. Being a white, European/Cuban writer who published on the subject of the Haitian Revolution, it has been implied that Carpentier chose to write from Ti Noël's point of view so that he would avoid being criticized for any racial stereotyping. Carpentier incorporates symbolic architecture throughout the novel; representing the dictatorship of colonial rule with structures such as the Sans-Souci Palace and the fortress of La Ferrière.

=== La música en Cuba (The Music of Cuba) ===
La música en Cuba (The Music of Cuba) is an ethno-musicological study of the Music of Cuba starting from the sixteenth century with the arrival of European explorers, until the present day of publication, the mid-twentieth century. The blending of different cultures—black, white, mulattoes, criollos and natives—mirrors the blending of Cuba's two main musical styles, the Christian European music and the elemental percussion and rhythm-based music of the transported Africans and aboriginal peoples of the island. The book includes a general history of music in colonized Latin America but mainly focuses on Cuban styles of music and dance, influential Cuban musicians and Cuban musical identity. Carpentier devotes a great deal of his study to exploring the influence African descendants had on Cuban music. He has an entire chapter titled, "Los Negros" ("The Blacks") that explores the many substantial ways African music influenced all of Latin American music. According to Carpentier, the African influence on Cuban music in particular was deliberately concealed by the colonist prejudice of 18th- and 19th-century Cuba. At the time of the book's publication many white Cubans were reluctant to even acknowledge the blending of the cultures much less investigate it. Carpentier, though, was eager to do so and by making bold statements about Cuba's past and integral relationships with a wide range of cultures he succeeded in giving back to Cuba an in-depth academic perspective of its own cultural identity through its music.

=== Guerra del tiempo (The War of Time) ===
Guerra del tiempo (The War of Time) is a set of surrealistic short stories, in a variety of styles, which evidences Carpentier's ability to work with the fantastic and the surreal. The most important is the first one, "El Camino de Santiago" (The Way of Santiago), which narrates the adventures of a commoner, a Spaniard in the Age of Discovery, who is today a soldier, tomorrow pilgrim, then a sailor, a colonizer, prisoner, and so on; he pursues every dream and suffers every disappointment. The second tale is called "Viaje a la semilla" (Journey Back to the Source). This narrative is striking for the function of the time inversion that the narrator operates to tell the life of the main character, Don Marcial (Marqués de Capellanías).

=== El Acoso (The Chase) ===
Carpentier's El Acoso was originally published in Spanish in 1956. It was translated into American English by Alfred MacAdam as The Chase and published by Farrar, Straus and Giroux in 1989, after over three decades of suppression in the United States for Carpentier's affiliation with Fidel Castro's Cuba (Carpentier had been Cuba's ambassador to France during this time). The novel is one of the most influential novels in contemporary Latin American literature, cited by authors such as Gabriel García Márquez, Mario Vargas Llosa, José Donoso and others as a major influence in the movement known in North America as Latin American Magical Realism, though this identification is somewhat misleading (see section above on Carpentier's theory of Lo real maravilloso) as Carpentier, in his lo real maravilloso, makes a point of referring to actual events that are so fantastic they seem magical, while the Magic Realists used Surrealist techniques and invent completely imaginary events with only the most tenuous connection to history or real events. As for El Acoso, the novel is highly compressed, richly atmospheric, philosophical, stylistically brilliant, and non-linear; plot is treated almost as an inconsequential side-effect. Though short (121 pages in its English translation), the novel exhibits a certain labyrinthine quality as its fragmented narrative cycles and circles in upon itself. Ostensibly a man is being chased by somewhat shadowy, probably sinister, perhaps governmental, forces. The action starts on a rainy night at a symphonic concert and music plays a part in the clues necessary to piece together what is happening. The Chase is perhaps Carpentier's strongest novel, and easily one of the better novels written in the 20th century, though it is almost unknown in the English-speaking world in spite of MacAdam's superb 1989 translation.

=== El arpa y la sombra (The Harp and the Shadow) ===
The Harp and the Shadow is a historic novel (also considered the first novel in the literary style of La nueva crónica de Indias) published in 1979. It follows two attempts by popes Pius IX and Leo XIII to beatify Christopher Columbus, both of which eventually fail. The second part of the novel, which is considerably longer than the other two, is a confession by Columbus, to be given to a Franciscan confessor. Raymond L. Williams sees the novel as "a fictional narrative about the life of Christopher Columbus and his fate as a historical figure. This novel is laden with allusions to Western literary tradition, from classical antiquity to modern Caribbean". James J. Pancrazio writes that "the confession is ironic because it never occurs; when the priest arrives to administer the Last Rites, Columbus, after painstakingly contemplating his life, decides that he has nothing to confess. In this regard, the mediation of guilt, not repentance, is what structures the confession."

== Style ==
=== Baroque ===
The Baroque style dates back to the cultural period of the 17th and early 18th centuries. It is most often defined as "the dominant style of art in Europe between the Mannerist and Rococo eras, a style characterized by dynamic movement, overt emotion and self-confident rhetoric". Carpentier first became fascinated with this style in architecture and sculpture; however, he later describes el barroco as un espíritu, and not un estilo histórico ("a spirit, not an historical style"). Wakefield insists that this attitude towards the Baroque stemmed from Carpentier's background in both Europe and Latin America which allowed him to take on a superior front in the face of post-colonialism and ultimately have the literary upper-hand where he could use European style to tell the Latin American story. Carpentier developed his vision of the baroque in his early works before he described himself as a baroque writer. He experimented with the technique in several developmental stages: "first as a cultural style of aesthetic fascination, later as a literary device to create period ambiance, and finally as a weapon of postcolonial pride, defiance and one-upmanship".

This style strongly presents itself when comparing works such as the early Ecue-Yamba-O to the celebrated El reino de este mundo, regarding Carpentier's use of more historically eloquent vocabulary in the latter, instead of the authentic language of the ethnically inspired characters. Here he escapes the stereotype of "nativism" by incorporating European standards, but continues to achieve a sense of normalcy without the expected use of the colloquialisms which the protagonist Ti Noel would undoubtedly use.

Kaup claims that Carpentier utilizes what is known as the "New World Baroque", since Latin America didn't come into contact with the Enlightenment or "European modernity". This contraconquista (counter conquest) allows the New World authors to experiment with new identities and the manners of expressing them. As such, Carpentier observed in his 1975 essay that "American Baroque develop[ed] along with criollo culture ...: the awareness of being Other, of being new, of being symbiotic, of being a criollo; and the criollo spirit is itself a Baroque spirit." This criollo of the New World Baroque is often seen as the dominant style of European literature emerging as a subordinate literary construction in Latin America.

=== Influence of travel ===
Wakefield notes that Carpentier's diverse travels were motivated by his need to incorporate the sights he experienced into familiar descriptions within his novels. Carpentier's El reino de este mundo was inspired by his 1943 trip to Haiti, and Los pasos perdidos drew on his visit to Venezuela in 1949. Similarly, his travels to Guadeloupe and the Gulf of Santa Fe inspired El siglo de las luces, and Vera and Enrique's firsthand descriptions of Baku and Mexico in La consegración de la primavera were drawn from Carpentier's trips to those places.

=== Surrealism ===
During his visit to France early in his life, Carpentier met and collaborated with many figures of the French Surrealist movement. Taken with Surrealist theory, Carpentier absorbed much of it from his contemporaries, mainly his friend and colleague, the Parisian journalist Robert Desnos. Striving to portray unlikely beauty, termed, "the third beauty", Surrealist theory embraced unique perspectives of the world. Within the Surrealist theory was the concept of Primitivism or a reverence for presiding folkloric tradition. Carpentier, inspired by French Surrealists, learned to view his Cuban home in this new light. He left France with a bursting sense of Cuban and Latin American pride and the artistic goal to capture what it meant to be both.

== See also ==
- Latino literature
- Caribbean literature
- Latin American literature
