= In Evil Hour =

Novel by Gabriel García Márquez

- First edition (Spanish)
- Author: Gabriel García Márquez
- Original title: La mala hora
- Translator: Gregory Rabassa
- Language: Spanish
- Publisher: Premio Literario Esso (Spain); Harper & Row (US)
- Publication date: 1962
- Publication place: Colombia
- English publication date: 1979
- Media type: Print (Hardback & Paperback)
- Pages: 183
- ISBN: 978-0-06-011414-5
- OCLC: 5633093
- Dewey Decimal: 863 19
- LC Class: PQ8180.17.A73 M313 1979

In Evil Hour (Spanish: La mala hora) is a novel by Colombian writer Gabriel García Márquez, first published (in an edition disowned by the author) in 1962.

Written while García Márquez lived in Paris, the story was originally entitled Este pueblo de mierda (This Town of Shit or This Shitty Town). Rewritten, it won a literary prize in Colombia.

Some of the same characters and situations found in La mala hora later re-appear in Cien años de soledad.

== Plot ==
In Evil Hour takes place in a nameless Colombian village. Someone has been placing satirical pasquinades about the town, outlining the locals' shameful secrets. Some dismiss these as common gossip. However, when a man kills his wife's supposed lover after reading of her infidelity, the mayor decides that action is called for. He declares martial law and sends soldiers (who are actually armed thugs) to patrol the streets. He also uses the 'state of unrest' as an excuse to crack down on his political enemies.
