= Marcel Moreau =

Belgian writer (1933–2020)

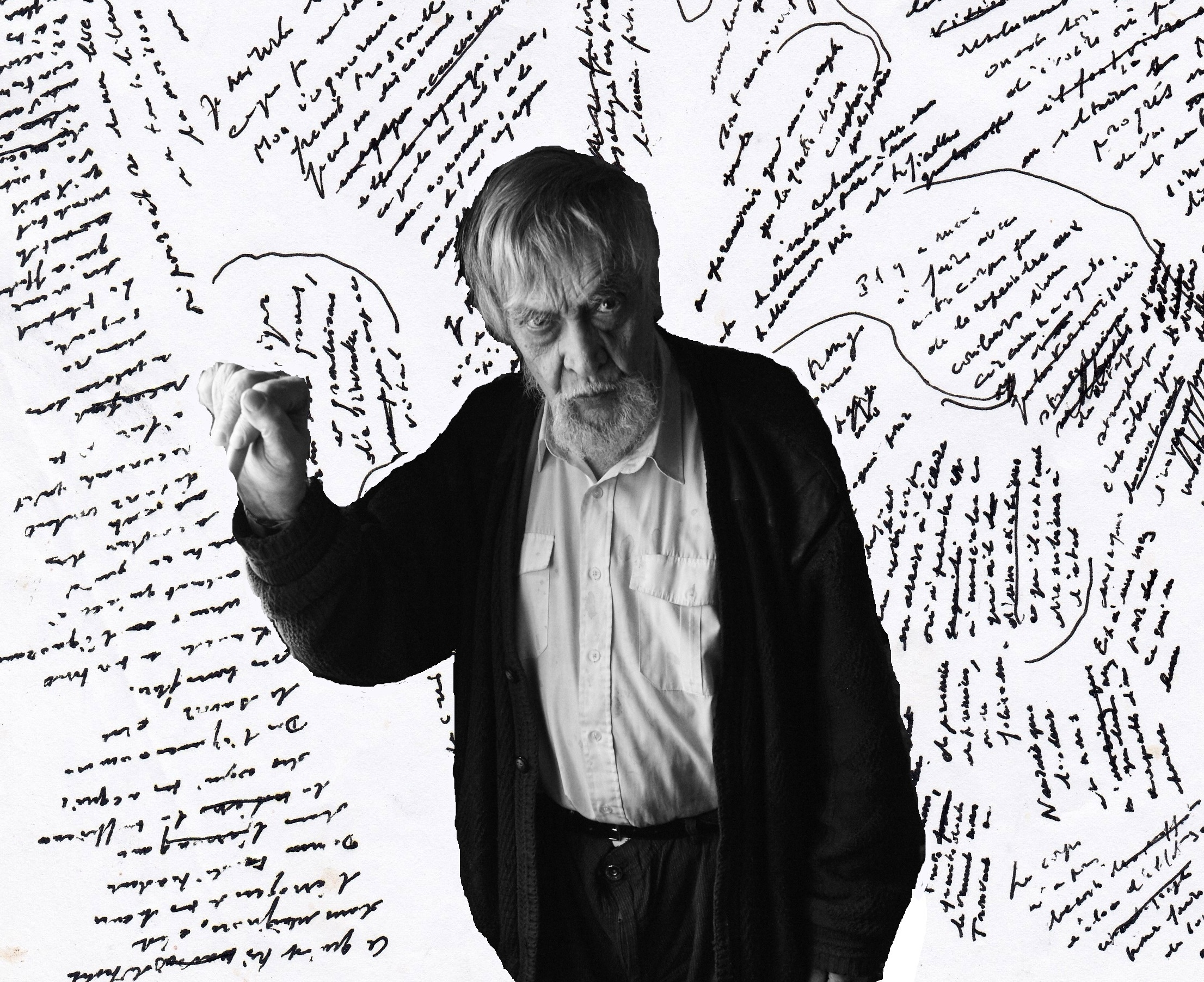

Marcel Moreau (16 April 1933 − 4 April 2020) was a Belgian writer. He was born in Boussu, a town in the mining region of Borinage in Hainaut Province, into a working-class environment. He described it as "a pure cultural void" with "a total absence of any cultural reference point". He lost his father at the age of 15, and abandoned his studies a short time later. He worked in various trades before becoming an accountant's assistant in Brussels for the newspaper Le Peuple. In 1955 he became a proof-reader for the daily Le Soir.

Marcel Moreau married in 1957 and fathered two children. In 1963 he published his first novel, Quintes, notably praised by Simone de Beauvoir. Then followed Bannière de bave (Dribble Banner, 1965), La terre infestée d'hommes (Earth Infested with Men, 1966) and Le chant des paroxysmes (The Sound of Paroxysms, 1967). He moved to Paris in 1968, where he continued proof-reading. He worked for Alpha Encyclopédie, then for Le Parisien in 1971, and later for Le Figaro, until 1989. He travelled widely, to the USSR, India, Cameroon, China, Iran, Nepal, Canada, Mexico, the United States. He was friends with such cultural figures as Roland Topor, Anaïs Nin, Jean Dubuffet and Jean Paulhan. Considered a marginal writer with an idiosyncratic style, he was the author of a considerable body of work.

He died in Bobigny (a suburb of Paris), on 4 April 2020, of COVID-19 during the pandemic.

== Bibliography ==
- Quintes, Buchet-Chastel, 1962 (published in the United States as The Selves of Quinte 1965)
- Bannière de bave, Gallimard, 1966
- La Terre infestée d'hommes, Buchet-Chastel, 1966
- Le chant des paroxysmes, Buchet-Chastel, 1967
- Écrits du fonds de l'amour, Buchet-Chastel, 1968
- Julie ou la dissolution, C. Bourgois, 1971
- La Pensée mongole, Christian Bourgois, 1972; Ether vague, 1991
- L'Ivre livre, Christian Bourgois, 1973
- Le Bord de mort, Christian Bourgois, 1974
- Les Arts viscéraux, Christian Bourgois, 1975; Ether vague, 1994
- Sacre de la femme, Christian Bourgois, 1977; Ether vague (corrected and revised edition), 1991
- Discours contre les entraves, C. Bourgois, 1979
- A dos de Dieu ou l'ordure lyrique, Luneau Ascot, 1980
- Orgambide scènes de la vie perdante, Luneau Ascot, 1980
- Moreaumachie, Buchet-Chastel, 1982
- Cahier caniculaires, Lettres Vives, 1982
- Kamalalam, L'Age d'homme, 1982
- Saulitude, photographs by Christian Calméjane, Accent, 1982
- Incandescence and Egobiographie tordue, Labor, 1984
- Monstre, Luneau Ascot, 1986
- Issue sans issue, Ether vague, 1986 & 1996
- Le Grouilloucouillou, in collaboration with Roland Topor, Atelier Clot, Bramsen et Georges, 1987
- Treize portraits, in collaboration with Antonio Saura, Atelier Clot, Bramsen, et Georges, 1987
- Amours à en mourir, Lettres Vives, 1988
- Opéra gouffre, La Pierre d'Alun, 1988
- Mille voix rauques, Buchet-Chastel, 1989
- Neung, conscience fiction, L'Ether Vague, 1990
- L'Œuvre Gravé, Didier Devillez, 1992
- Chants de la tombée des jours, Cadex, 1992
- Le charme et l'épouvante, La Différence, 1992
- Noces de mort, Lettres Vives, 1993
- Stéphane Mandelbaum, D. Devillez, 1992
- Tombeau pour les enténébrés, L'Ether Vague, 1993
- Bal dans la tête, La Différence, 1995
- La compagnie des femmes, Lettres Vives, 1996
- Insensément ton corps, Cadex, 1997
- Quintes, Mihaly, 1998
- La jeune fille et son fou, Lettres vives, 1998
- Extase pour une infante roumaine, Lettres Vives, 1998
- La vie de Jéju, Actes Sud, 1998
