= Energy and Power =

Book by Lyon Sprague de Camp

- Cover of Energy and Power
- Author: L. Sprague de Camp
- Illustrator: Weimer Pursell and Fred Eng
- Language: English
- Subject: Science
- Publisher: Golden Press
- Publication date: 1962
- Publication place: United States
- Media type: Print (Hardback)
- Pages: 54 pp

Energy and Power is a 1962 science book for children by L. Sprague de Camp, illustrated by Weimer Pursell and Fred Eng, published by Golden Press as part of The Golden Library of Knowledge Series. It has been translated into Portuguese and Spanish.

The title blurb summarizes the content as "How man uses animals, wind, water, heat, electricity, chemistry, and atoms to perform work."
